= Latvia in the Eurovision Song Contest 2004 =

- Eurovision Song Contest 2004
- Participating broadcaster: Latvijas Televīzija (LTV)
- Country: Latvia
- Selection process: Eirodziesma 2004
- Selection date: 28 February 2004

Competing entry
- Song: "Dziesma par laimi"
- Artist: Fomins and Kleins
- Songwriters: Tomass Kleins; Guntars Račs

Placement
- Semi-final result: Failed to qualify (17th)

Participation chronology

Latvia was represented at the Eurovision Song Contest 2004 with the song "Dziesma par laimi", composed by Guntars Račs, with lyrics by Tomass Kleins, and performed by Fomins and Kleins. The Latvian participating broadcaster, Latvijas Televīzija (LTV), organised the national final Eirodziesma 2004 in order to select its entry for the contest. Ten songs were selected to compete in the national final on 28 February 2004 where two rounds of public televoting selected "Dziesma par laimi" performed by Fomins and Kleins as the winner. This was the first-ever entry performed in Latvian in the Eurovision Song Contest.

Latvia competed in the semi-final of the Eurovision Song Contest which took place on 12 May 2004. Performed during the show in position four, "Dziesma par laimi" was not announced among the top 10 entries of the semi-final and therefore did not qualify to compete in the final. It was later revealed that Latvia placed seventeenth out of the 22 participating countries in the semi-final with 23 points.

== Background ==
Prior to the 2004 contest, Latvijas Televīzija (LTV) had participated in the Eurovision Song Contest representing Latvia four times since its first entry in 2000. It won the contest once in 2002 with the song "I Wanna" performed by Marie N. Its 2003 entry "Hello from Mars" performed by F.L.Y. placed twenty-fourth.

As part of its duties as participating broadcaster, LTV organises the selection of its entry in the Eurovision Song Contest and broadcasts the event in the country. Since its debut in 2000, the broadcaster has selected its entries for the contest through the national final Eirodziesma. LTV confirmed its intentions to participate at the 2004 contest on 30 September 2003. Along with its participation confirmation, it announced that it would organise Eirodziesma 2004 in order to select its entry for the 2004 contest.

== Before Eurovision ==
=== Eirodziesma 2004 ===
Eirodziesma 2004 was the fifth edition of Eirodziesma, the music competition organised by LTV to select its entries for the Eurovision Song Contest. The competition took place at the Olympic Center in Ventspils on 28 February 2004, hosted by Dāvids Ernštreits and Ija Circene and broadcast on LTV1. The show was watched by 706,000 viewers in Latvia.

==== Competing entries ====
Artists and songwriters were able to submit their entries to the broadcaster between 1 October 2003 and 15 November 2003. A record 69 entries were submitted at the conclusion of the submission period. A jury panel appointed by LTV evaluated the submitted songs and selected ten entries for the competition. The jury panel consisted of SKAMP (Lithuania 2001), Urban Trad (Belgium 2003), Alf Poier (Austria 2003), One (Cyprus 2002), Marius Bratten (Swedish director), Tim Gruhl (German journalist), Ivar Must (Estonian composer), Rolands Ūdris (singer), Alec Matko (International Coordinator of OGAE), and members of the LTV Eurovision team. The ten competing artists and songs were announced during a press conference on 3 December 2003.

Artist	Song	Songwriter(s)
4.elements	"Ready"	Lauris Reiniks
Amber	"Fly Away With You"	Jānis Stībelis
C-Stones	"All You Know"	Līva Boitmane, Zane Beļska, Kristians Korns, Olafs Bergmanis
Chilli	"Not That Everyday Girl"	Mārtiņš Freimanis
Fomins and Kleins	"Dziesma par laimi"	Tomass Kleins, Guntars Račs
Johnny Salamander and Meldra	"We Share the Sun"	Valters Sprūdžs, Janis Gūža
Kristīne Broka and Santa Zapacka	"Angel's Song"	Kristīne Broka, Daigas Rūtenberga
Rain	"Let Me"	Natalia Ryumina
Tatjana Timčuka	"Like a Star"	Olegs Borosnevs, Deniss Timčuks
Z-Scars	"Runaway"	Andris Kivičs

==== Final ====
The final took place on 28 February 2004. Ten acts competed and the winner was selected over two rounds of public televoting. In the first round, the top three songs advanced to the second round, the superfinal. In the superfinal, "Dziesma par laimi" performed by Fomins and Kleins was declared the winner. In addition to the performances of the competing entries, guest performers included the project re:public F.L.Y. (Latvia 2003), Dzintars Čīča (Junior Latvia 2003), Neiokõsõ (Estonia 2004), Jari Sillanpää (Finland 2004), Julie and Ludwig (Malta 2004), and Ruslana (Ukraine 2004).

Final – 28 February 2004
R/O	Artist	Song	Televote	Place
1	Fomins and Kleins	"Dziesma par laimi"	18,830	2
2	Kristīne Broka and Santa Zapacka	"Angel's Song"	4,835	8
3	4.elements	"Ready"	5,374	7
4	Tatjana Timčuka	"Like a Star"	13,393	3
5	Rain	"Let Me"	3,389	9
6	C-Stones	"All You Know"	9,318	4
7	Johnny Salamander and Meldra	"We Share the Sun"	19,646	1
8	Chilli	"Not That Everyday Girl"	5,888	6
9	Z-Scars	"Runaway"	8,951	5
10	Amber	"Fly Away With You"	1,347	10

Superfinal – 28 February 2004
R/O	Artist	Song	Televote	Place
1	Tatjana Timčuka	"Like a Star"	18,879	3
2	Johnny Salamander and Meldra	"We Share the Sun"	37,844	2
3	Fomins and Kleins	"Dziesma par laimi"	41,297	1

=== Promotion ===
Fomins and Kleins specifically promoted "Dziesma par laimi" as the Latvian Eurovision entry by taking part in promotional activities in Lithuania on 8 and 9 April, including a performance at the Club Egivela in Panevėžys on 9 April. Estonian, Lithuanian, Ukrainian, English, German, and Belarusian language versions of "Dziesma par laimi" was also recorded by the artists, with the Belarusian version being recorded together with Aleksandra and Konstantin (Belarus 2004) on 15 April.

== At Eurovision ==
It was announced that the competition's format would be expanded to include a semi-final in 2004. According to the rules, all nations with the exceptions of the host country, the "Big Four" (France, Germany, Spain and the United Kingdom) and the ten highest placed finishers in the 2003 contest are required to qualify from the semi-final on 12 May 2004 in order to compete for the final on 15 May 2004; the top ten countries from the semi-final progress to the final. On 23 March 2004, a special allocation draw was held which determined the running order for the semi-final and Latvia was set to perform in position 4, following the entry from Switzerland and before the entry from Israel. At the end of the semi-final, Latvia was not announced among the top 10 entries in the semi-final and therefore failed to qualify to compete in the final. It was later revealed that Latvia placed seventeenth in the semi-final, receiving a total of 23 points.

The semi-final and the final were broadcast in Latvia on LTV1 with all shows featuring commentary by Kārlis Streips. LTV appointed Lauris Reiniks as its spokesperson to announce the Latvian votes during the final.

=== Voting ===
Below is a breakdown of points awarded to Latvia and awarded by Latvia in the semi-final and grand final of the contest. The nation awarded its 12 points to Estonia in the semi-final and to Ukraine in the final of the contest.

Following the release of the televoting figures by the EBU after the conclusion of the competition, it was revealed that a total of 67,349 televotes were cast in Latvia during the two shows: 26,896 votes during the semi-final and 40,453 votes during the final.

==== Points awarded to Latvia ====
Points awarded to Latvia (Semi-final)
Score	Country
12 points	
10 points	
8 points	
7 points	
6 points	Lithuania
5 points	Estonia
4 points	Belarus; Ireland
3 points	
2 points	Israel; Monaco
1 point	

==== Points awarded by Latvia ====
Points awarded by Latvia (Semi-final)
Score	Country
12 points	Estonia
10 points	Ukraine
8 points	Lithuania
7 points	Malta
6 points	Greece
5 points	Albania
4 points	Serbia and Montenegro
3 points	Cyprus
2 points	Netherlands
1 point	Croatia

Points awarded by Latvia (Final)
Score	Country
12 points	Ukraine
10 points	Russia
8 points	Sweden
7 points	Greece
6 points	Malta
5 points	Serbia and Montenegro
4 points	Cyprus
3 points	United Kingdom
2 points	Turkey
1 point	Albania
