= Malta in the Eurovision Song Contest 2003 =

- Eurovision Song Contest 2003
- Participating broadcaster: Public Broadcasting Services (PBS)
- Country: Malta
- Selection process: Malta Song for Europe 2003
- Selection date: 8 February 2003

Competing entry
- Song: "To Dream Again"
- Artist: Lynn Chircop
- Songwriters: Alfred Zammit; Cynthia Sammut

Placement
- Final result: 25th, 4 points

Participation chronology

Malta was represented at the Eurovision Song Contest 2003 with the song "To Dream Again", composed by Alfred Zammit, with lyrics by Cynthia Sammut, and performed by Lynn Chircop. The Maltese participating broadcaster, Public Broadcasting Services (PBS), selected its entry for the contest through the national final Malta Song for Europe 2003. The competition consisted of a semi-final round and a final, held on 7 and 8 February 2003, respectively, where "To Dream Again" performed by Lynn Chircop eventually emerged as the winning entry after scoring the most points from a five-member jury and a public televote.

Malta competed in the Eurovision Song Contest which took place on 24 May 2003. Performing during the show in position 5, Malta placed twenty-fifth out of the 26 participating countries, scoring 4 points.

== Background ==
Prior to the 2003 Contest, the Maltese Broadcasting Authority (MBA) until 1975, and the Public Broadcasting Services (PBS) since 1991, had participated in the Eurovision Song Contest representing Malta fifteen times since MBA's first entry in 1971. After competing in 1975, Malta was absent from the contest beginning in 1976. They had, to this point, competed in every contest since returning in 1991. Its best placing in the contest thus far was second, achieved in 2002 with the song "7th Wonder" performed by Ira Losco.

As part of its duties as participating broadcaster, PBS organises the selection of its entry in the Eurovision Song Contest and broadcasts the event in the country. The broadcaster confirmed its intentions to participate in the 2003 contest on 16 September 2002. PBS selected their entry consistently through a national final procedure, a method that was continued for its 2003 participation.

== Before Eurovision ==
=== Malta Song for Europe 2003 ===
Malta Song for Europe 2003 was the national final format developed by PBS to select its entry for the Eurovision Song Contest 2003. The competition consisted of a semi-final and final held on 7 and 8 February 2003, respectively, at the Malta Fairs & Conventions Centre in Ta' Qali. Both shows were hosted by Gianni Zammit and Mireille Bonello and broadcast on Television Malta (TVM) as well as on the website di-ve.com.

==== Format ====
The competition consisted of twenty-four songs competing in the semi-final on 7 February 2003 where the top sixteen entries qualified to compete in the final on 8 February 2003. Five judges evaluated the songs during the shows and each judge had an equal stake in the final result. The results of the public televote had a weighting equal to the total votes of the judges. Ties in the final results were broken based on the entry which received the higher score from the judges.

==== Competing entries ====
Artists and composers were able to submit their entries between 16 September 2002 and 15 November 2002. Both artists and songwriters were required to be Maltese or possess Maltese citizenship. Artists were able to submit as many songs as they wished, however, they could only compete with a maximum of two in the competition. 238 entries were received by the broadcaster. On 23 November 2002, PBS announced a shortlist of 50 entries that had progressed through the selection process. The twenty-four songs selected to compete in the semi-final were announced on 17 December 2002. Among the selected competing artists was former Maltese Eurovision entrant Paul Giordimaina (who represented Malta in 1991). The jury panel that selected the twenty-four semi-finalists consisted of Brian Micallef (Malta), Peo Nylén (Sweden), Jörg Hiller (Germany), Daniel Schmidt (Germany), Niamh White (Ireland), and Regine Tank Oberhofer (Germany).

==== Semi-final ====
The semi-final took place on 7 February 2003. Twenty-four songs competed for sixteen qualifying spots in the final. The interval act of the show featured performances by Fabrizio Faniello, who represented Malta in 2001, the Belgian group Ian Van Dahl; and the local acts Ali Bubaker, Corkskrew, Kristina Casolani, and Winter Moods.

Semi-final – 7 February 2003
R/O	Artist	Song	Songwriter(s)	Result
1	Roger Tirazona	"Feel the Beat"	Paul Abela, Roger Tirazona	—N/a
2	The Mics	"Take Me Back Again"	Wayne Micallef, Alfred C. Sant	Qualified
3	Olivia Lewis feat. IQ's Verse-One	"Starting Over"	Paul Abela, Georgina Abela	Qualified
4	Lawrence Gray	"Why Not"	Ray Agius	Qualified
5	Mark Tonna	"Welcome"	Mark Spiteri Lucas, Mark Tonna	—N/a
6	Marisa D'Amato	"Survive (To Stay Alive)"	Tarcisio Barbara, Joe Chircop	Qualified
7	Andreana and Karl	"Angels"	Karl Spiteri	Qualified
8	Shirley Galea	"Call My Name"	Renato Briffa, Ray Mahoney	—N/a
9	Eleanor Cassar	"Someday You Will See"	Mark Debono, Doris Chetcuti	Qualified
10	Gunther Chetcuti	"Light of My Life"	Paul Abela, Roger Tirazona, Doris Chetcuti	Qualified
11	Natasha and Charlene	"Rain of Fire"	Charlene Grima, Deo Grech	—N/a
12	Rita Pace	"On Top of the World"	Rita Pace	—N/a
13	Eleanor Cassar	"Tell Me Why"	Eugenio Schembri, Doris Chetcuti	Qualified
14	Rosman Pace	"Love Will Shine Forever"	Jason Cassar, Sunny Aquilina	Qualified
15	Konrad Pulѐ	"Everywhere You Go"	Konrad Pulѐ	Qualified
16	Nadine Axisa	"Look at Me"	Dominic Galea, Ray Mahoney	—N/a
17	Lynn Chircop	"To Dream Again"	Alfred Zammit, Cynthia Sammut	Qualified
18	Johanna Guzman	"I Believe in Love"	Enzo Guzman, Joe Julian Farrugia, Johanna Guzman	—N/a
19	Natasha and Charlene	"Superstitious"	Philip Vella, Gerard James Borg	Qualified
20	Paul Giordimaina, Andrew Zammit and Godwin Lucas	"My Song"	Paul Giordimaina, Fleur Balzan	Qualified
21	Julie and Ludwig	"My Number One"	Philip Vella, Joe Julian Farrugia	Qualified
22	Romina Mamo	"Here Today Gone Tomorrow"	Dominic Galea, Joe Friggieri	—N/a
23	Karen Polidano	"One Touch"	Philip Vella, Joe Chircop	Qualified
24	Lawrence Gray	"And the Music"	Dominic Galea, Mark Doneo	Qualified

==== Final ====
The final took place on 8 February 2003. The sixteen entries that qualified from the semi-final were performed again and the 50/50 combination of votes of a five-member jury panel and the results of public televoting determined the winner. The interval act of the show featured performances by Marie N (who won Eurovision for Latvia in 2002), Ira Losco (who represented Malta in 2002) and Lior Narkis (who would represent Israel in 2003). After the votes from the jury panel and televote were combined, "To Dream Again" performed by Lynn Chircop was the winner.

Final – 8 February 2003
R/O	Artist	Song	Jury	Televote	Total	Place
1	The Mics	"Take Me Back Again"	41	25	66	14
2	Olivia Lewis feat. IQ's Verse-One	"Starting Over"	27	80	107	6
3	Lawrence Gray	"Why Not"	47	100	147	2
4	Marisa D'Amato	"Survive (To Stay Alive)"	51	5	56	15
5	Andreana and Karl	"Angels"	17	55	72	11
6	Eleanor Cassar	"Someday You Will See"	77	15	92	7
7	Gunther Chetcuti	"Light of My Life"	55	70	125	3
8	Eleanor Cassar	"Tell Me Why"	69	10	79	9
9	Rosman Pace	"Love Will Shine Forever"	43	40	83	8
10	Konrad Pulѐ	"Everywhere You Go"	17	20	37	16
11	Lynn Chircop	"To Dream Again"	90	60	150	1
12	Natasha and Charlene	"Superstitious"	63	45	108	5
13	Paul Giordimaina, Andrew Zammit and Godwin Lucas	"My Song"	44	35	79	10
14	Julie and Ludwig	"My Number One"	30	90	120	4
15	Karen Polidano	"One Touch"	39	30	69	12
16	Lawrence Gray	"And the Music"	19	50	69	13

Detailed Jury Votes
R/O	Song	Juror					Total
R/O	Song	1	2	3	4	5	Total
1	"Take Me Back Again"	11	9	6	10	5	41
2	"Starting Over"	2	8	5	6	6	27
3	"Why Not"	14	7	4	2	20	47
4	"Survive (To Stay Alive)"	12	10	9	16	4	51
5	"Angels"	9	1	3	3	1	17
6	"Someday You Will See"	18	16	18	11	14	77
7	"Light of My Life"	10	12	12	5	16	55
8	"Tell Me Why"	8	20	16	14	11	69
9	"Love Will Shine Forever"	7	11	10	8	7	43
10	"Everywhere You Go"	1	2	8	4	2	17
11	"To Dream Again"	20	18	20	20	12	90
12	"Superstitious"	16	4	7	18	18	63
13	"My Song"	6	14	14	7	3	44
14	"My Number One"	5	3	1	12	9	30
15	"One Touch"	4	6	11	9	10	39
16	"And the Music"	3	5	2	1	8	19

== At Eurovision ==
The Eurovision Song Contest 2003 took place on 24 May 2003 at the Skonto Hall in Riga, Latvia. According to Eurovision rules, all nations with the exceptions of the bottom five countries in the 2002 contest competed. On 29 November 2002, an allocation draw was held which determined the running order and Malta was set to perform in position 5, following the entry from Turkey and before the entry from Bosnia and Herzegovina. Malta placed twenty-fifth in the final, scoring 4 points.

The show was broadcast in Malta on TVM with commentary by John Bundy.

=== Voting ===
Below is a breakdown of points awarded to Malta and awarded by Malta in the contest. PBS appointed Sharon Borg as its spokesperson to announce the Maltese votes during the show.

Points awarded to Malta
Score	Country
12 points	
10 points	
8 points	
7 points	
6 points	
5 points	
4 points	
3 points	Ireland
2 points	
1 point	Portugal

Points awarded by Malta
Score	Country
12 points	Iceland
10 points	Poland
8 points	Sweden
7 points	Netherlands
6 points	Norway
5 points	Ireland
4 points	Turkey
3 points	Germany
2 points	Cyprus
1 point	Russia
