= Malta in the Eurovision Song Contest 2004 =

- Eurovision Song Contest 2004
- Participating broadcaster: Public Broadcasting Services (PBS)
- Country: Malta
- Selection process: Malta Song for Europe 2004
- Selection date: 13–14 February 2004

Competing entry
- Song: "On Again... Off Again"
- Artist: Julie and Ludwig
- Songwriters: Philip Vella; Gerard James Borg

Placement
- Semi-final result: Qualified (8th, 74 points)
- Final result: 12th, 50 points

Participation chronology

Malta was represented at the Eurovision Song Contest 2004 with the song "On Again... Off Again", composed by Philip Vella, with lyrics by Gerard James Borg, and performed by the duo Julie and Ludwig. The Maltese participating broadcaster, Public Broadcasting Services (PBS), selected its entry for the contest through the national final Malta Song for Europe 2004. The competition consisted of a final, held on 13 and 14 February 2004, where "On Again... Off Again" performed by Julie and Ludwig eventually emerged as the winning entry after scoring the most points from a four-member jury and a public televote.

Malta competed in the semi-final of the Eurovision Song Contest which took place on 12 May 2004. Performing during the show in position 8, "On Again... Off Again" was announced among the top 10 entries of the semi-final and therefore qualified to compete in the final on 14 May. It was later revealed that Malta placed eighth out of the 22 participating countries in the semi-final with 74 points. In the final, Malta performed in position 6 and placed twelfth out of the 24 participating countries, scoring 50 points.

== Background ==
Prior to the 2004 contest, the Maltese Broadcasting Authority (MBA) until 1975, and the Public Broadcasting Services (PBS) since 1991, had participated in the Eurovision Song Contest representing Malta sixteen times since MBA's first entry in 1971. After competing in 1975, Malta was absent from the contest beginning in 1976. They had, to this point, competed in every contest since returning in 1991. Its best placing in the contest thus far was second, achieved in 2002 with the song "7th Wonder" performed by Ira Losco. In 2003, "To Dream Again" performed by Lynn Chircop placed 25th.

As part of its duties as participating broadcaster, PBS organises the selection of its entry in the Eurovision Song Contest and broadcasts the event in the country. The broadcaster confirmed its intentions to participate at the 2004 contest on 10 October 2003. Malta selected their entry consistently through a national final procedure, a method that was continued for their 2004 participation.

== Before Eurovision ==
=== Malta Song for Europe 2004 ===
Malta Song for Europe 2004 was the national final format developed by PBS to select its entry for the Eurovision Song Contest 2004. The competition was held on 13 and 14 February 2004 at the Mediterranean Conference Centre in the nation's capital city of Valletta, hosted by Andrea Cassar and Ray Calleja and broadcast on Television Malta (TVM) as well as on the website di-ve.com.

==== Competing entries ====
Artists and composers were able to submit their entries between 10 October 2003 and 7 November 2003. Songwriters from any nationality were able to submit songs as long as the artist were Maltese or possessed Maltese citizenship. Artists were able to submit as many songs as they wished, however, they could only compete with a maximum of one in the competition. 189 entries were received by the broadcaster. On 10 December 2003, PBS announced a shortlist of 36 entries that had progressed through the selection process. The sixteen songs selected to compete in the competition were announced on 8 January 2004. Among the selected competing artists was former Maltese Eurovision entrants Georgina (1991), Debbie Scerri (1997), and Fabrizio Faniello (2001).

==== Final ====
The final took place on 13 and 14 February 2004. Sixteen entries competed and the 50/50 combination of votes of a four-member jury panel and the results of public televoting determined the winner. The interval act of the show on 13 February featured performances by local acts Claire Baluci, Antonello Persiano, Ray, Aka Fellas and the William Dance Group, while the interval act of the show on 14 February featured performances by the 2004 Ukrainian Eurovision entrant Ruslana and the local acts Claire Baluci, Ivan Filletti, Hooligan, Winter Moods and Aldo Busuttil. After the votes from the jury panel and televote were combined, "On Again... Off Again" performed by Julie and Ludwig was the winner.

Final – 13–14 February 2004
R/O	Artist	Song	Songwriter(s)	Jury	Televote	Total	Place
1	Leontine	"Love Moves the World"	Eugenio Schembri, Doris Chetcuti	35	12	47	11
2	Andreana	"24/7"	Mark Spiteri Lucas, Deo Grech	23	40	63	8
3	Rita Pace	"Dying to Be Free"	Rita Pace	15	8	23	16
4	Roger Tirazona	"Give Me One More Night"	Paul Abela, Roger Tirazona	31	16	47	11
5	Fiona	"One Way Love"	Rene Mamo, Joe Julian Farrugia	25	24	49	9
6	Natasha and Charlene	"A Simple Wish"	Charlene Grima, Deo Grech	15	32	47	11
7	Julie and Ludwig	"On Again... Off Again"	Philip Vella, Gerard James Borg	59	80	139	1
8	Eleanor Cassar	"Through All My Life"	Paul Giordimaina, Fleur Balzan	41	36	77	7
9	Keith Camilleri	"Tango 4 Two"	Philip Vella, Gerard James Borg	45	44	89	6
10	Georgina	"Close to My Heart"	Paul Abela, Roger Tirazona	34	4	38	15
11	Debbie Scerri and Prodigal Sons	"Get Free"	Andrew Zammit, Debbie Scerri, Prodigal Sons	14	28	42	14
12	Ali and Lis	"It's a Wonderful Life"	Ralph Siegel, John O'Flynn	58	48	106	5
13	Olivia Lewis	"Take a Look"	Paul Giordimaina, Fleur Balzan	62	72	134	2
14	Marvic Lewis	"Can't Give My Love"	Paul Abela, Georgina Abela	28	20	48	10
15	Lawrence Gray	"You're On My Mind"	Philip Vella, Joe Chircop	51	56	107	4
16	Fabrizio Faniello	"Did I Ever Tell You"	Paul Abela, Georgina Abela	48	64	112	3

Detailed Jury Votes
R/O	Song	Juror				Total
R/O	Song	1	2	3	4	Total
1	"Love Moves the World"	4	8	7	16	35
2	"24/7"	1	10	4	8	23
3	"Dying to Be Free"	2	7	2	4	15
4	"Give Me One More Night"	6	9	11	5	31
5	"One Way Love"	3	11	9	2	25
6	"A Simple Wish"	5	6	1	3	15
7	"On Again... Off Again"	9	12	18	20	59
8	"Through All My Life"	16	5	8	12	41
9	"Tango 4 Two"	12	14	10	9	45
10	"Close to My Heart"	10	4	6	14	34
11	"Get Free"	7	3	3	1	14
12	"It's a Wonderful Life"	18	2	20	18	58
13	"Take a Look"	20	16	16	10	62
14	"Can't Give My Love"	11	1	5	11	28
15	"You're On My Mind"	14	18	12	7	51
16	"Did I Ever Tell You"	8	20	14	6	48

=== Preparation ===
Following Julie and Ludwig's win at the Malta Song for Europe 2004, PBS announced that "On Again... Off Again" would undergo remastering for the Eurovision Song Contest. The revamped version was produced by Ralph Siegel and the release of the song's new version and official music video was announced on 27 March 2004 and made available online. The music video for the song was filmed earlier in March at several places of Malta, including the Dwejra Window in Gozo, the San Anton Gardens in Attard and the Manoel Theatre in Valletta.

== At Eurovision ==
The Eurovision Song Contest 2004 took place at the Abdi İpekçi Arena in Istanbul, Turkey and consisted of a semi-final for the first time on 12 May and the final of 14 May, 2004. According to Eurovision rules, all nations with the exceptions of the host country, the "Big Four" (France, Germany, Spain, and the United Kingdom) and the ten highest placed finishers in the 2003 contest are required to qualify from the semi-final in order to compete for the final; the top ten countries from the semi-final progress to the final. On 23 March 2004, an allocation draw was held which determined the running order for the semi-final and Malta was set to perform in position 8, following the entry from Portugal and before the entry from Monaco. At the end of the semi-final, Malta was announced as having finished in the top 10 and consequently qualifying for the grand final. It was later revealed that Malta placed eighth in the semi-final, receiving a total of 74 points. The draw for the running order for the final was done by the presenters during the announcement of the ten qualifying countries during the semi-final and Malta was drawn to perform in position 6, following the entry from Serbia and Montenegro and before the entry from the Netherlands. Malta placed twelfth in the final, scoring 50 points.

The semi-final and the final were broadcast in Malta on TVM with commentary by Eileen Montesin. PBS appointed Claire Agius as its spokesperson to announce the Maltese votes during the final.

=== Voting ===
Below is a breakdown of points awarded to Malta and awarded by Malta in the semi-final and grand final of the contest. The nation awarded its 12 points to Greece in the semi-final and the final of the contest.

Following the release of the televoting figures by the EBU after the conclusion of the competition, it was revealed that a total of 22,503 televotes were cast in Malta during the two shows: 10,111 votes during the semi-final and 12,392 votes during the final.

==== Points awarded to Malta ====
Points awarded to Malta (Semi-final)
Score	Country
12 points	
10 points	Estonia
8 points	
7 points	Latvia; Lithuania
6 points	Albania; Israel
5 points	Andorra; United Kingdom
4 points	Bosnia and Herzegovina; Denmark; Macedonia; Portugal
3 points	Netherlands
2 points	Iceland; Ukraine
1 point	Belarus; Croatia; Greece; Ireland; Slovenia

Points awarded to Malta (Final)
Score	Country
12 points	
10 points	
8 points	
7 points	
6 points	Andorra; Estonia; Ireland; Latvia
5 points	
4 points	Israel; Lithuania
3 points	Albania; Macedonia; Poland
2 points	Croatia; United Kingdom
1 point	Bosnia and Herzegovina; Denmark; Greece; Portugal; Ukraine

==== Points awarded by Malta ====
Points awarded by Malta (Semi-final)
Score	Country
12 points	Greece
10 points	Ukraine
8 points	Albania
7 points	Netherlands
6 points	Israel
5 points	Cyprus
4 points	Serbia and Montenegro
3 points	Lithuania
2 points	Denmark
1 point	Macedonia

Points awarded by Malta (Final)
Score	Country
12 points	Greece
10 points	Albania
8 points	Ukraine
7 points	Cyprus
6 points	Serbia and Montenegro
5 points	Sweden
4 points	United Kingdom
3 points	Spain
2 points	Netherlands
1 point	Macedonia
