= Greece in the Eurovision Song Contest 2004 =

- Eurovision Song Contest 2004
- Participating broadcaster: Hellenic Broadcasting Corporation (ERT)
- Country: Greece
- Selection process: Internal selection
- Announcement date: Artist: 15 March 2004; Song: 20 March 2004

Competing entry
- Song: "Shake It"
- Artist: Sakis Rouvas
- Songwriters: Nikos Terzis; Nektarios Tyrakis

Placement
- Semi-final result: Qualified (3rd, 238 points)
- Final result: 3rd, 252 points

Participation chronology

Greece was represented at the Eurovision Song Contest 2004 with the song "Shake It", composed by Nikos Terzis, with lyrics by Nektarios Tyrakis, and performed by Sakis Rouvas. The Greek participating broadcaster, the Hellenic Broadcasting Corporation (ERT), internally selected its entry for the contest. Prior to Rouvas' selection, the broadcaster had organised a public selection process entitled Eurostar, consisting of live semi-final heats, leading to a three-participant national final to select its entrant. While the event did take place and Apostolos Psichramis was selected as the Greek entrant, the song selection portion did not materialize after the Rouvas announcement and Psichramis instead joined Rouvas as a backing vocalist.

To promote the entry, a music video for the song was released and Rouvas made appearances at events in Greece, Finland, Lithuania, Malta, France, Spain, and the United Kingdom. Greece was drawn to appear 10th in the semi-final, which was held on 12 May. There, the nation placed third with 238 points and qualified for the final, held three days later. At the final, Greece placed third with 252 points, tying its best contest placement to this point.

== Background ==
The Hellenic Broadcasting Corporation (ERT) is a full member of the European Broadcasting Union (EBU), thus eligible to participate in the Eurovision Song Contest representing Greece. Prior to the 2003 contest, Greece had participated in the contest twenty-three times since its first entry in 1974. To this point, its best result was third place which was achieved in 2001 with the song "Die for You" by Antique. Greece's least successful result was in 1998 when it placed 20th with the song "Mia krifi evaisthisia" by Thalassa, receiving only twelve points in total, all from Cyprus.

== Before Eurovision ==
=== Eurostar ===
In early October 2003, ERT began airing trailers encouraging participation by new artists for a talent show entitled Eurostar, which was intended to be used to select the Greek entry for the Eurovision Song Contest 2004. At a press conference held on 22 October, ERT managing director Johnny Kalimeris explained that the decision to arrange the event centered around increased interest in Eurovision in Greece combined with the desire to discover new talented solo artists. Eurostar was produced by ERT in cooperation with Fremantle and sponsors Minos EMI and Vodafone. As announced, the show would travel throughout Greece, holding auditions for interested artists who would sing a song of their choosing in front of a jury. The jury would then select finalists who would partake in live semi-final style rounds, referred to as "heats", leading up to a three-participant final round.

By the end of the auditions round, 36 contestants were selected by a three-member jury consisting of Dafni Bokota (singer and television presenter), Artemis Gounaki (vocal teacher) and Andreas Roditis (composer and television presenter) to participate in the show, which concluded with the final on 12 March 2004. Despite rumours that the final would be canceled in favor of instead internally selecting a high profile artist, specifically Sakis Rouvas, ERT ensured that the event would proceed as planned. Rouvas had previously stated in interviews on both MAD TV and Star Channel that he would love to have the chance to represent Greece, further fueling the rumours. In the final, the remaining three contestants competed and the winner, Apostolos Psichramis, was selected by a combination of televoting (40%) and jury voting (60%). Psichramis was then scheduled to perform three songs, all written by Nikos Terzis, during a song selection show to be held on 17 March, with the result determined solely by public televoting. Terzis had previously written two of Greece's prior Eurovision entries, including "Pia prosefhi" for Elina Konstantopoulou in 1995 and "Die for You" for Antique in 2001, the latter of which was Greece's highest placing to this point.

Results of Eurostar – 12 March 2004
| R/O | Artist | Song (Original artist) | Jury (60%) | Televote (40%) | Total | Place |
|---|---|---|---|---|---|---|
| 1 | Antonis Dominos | "Take On Me" (A-ha) | 21% | 13.2% | 34.2% | 2 |
| 2 | Gianna Fafaliou | "2 Be Together" (Maria-Louiza and Not 4 Sale) | 20.2% | 7.7% | 27.9% | 3 |
| 3 | Apostolos Psichramis | "Conga" (Miami Sound Machine) | 18.8% | 19.1% | 37.9% | 1 |

=== Internal selection ===
On 13 March 2004, Bokota confirmed the rumours that Sakis Rouvas would instead represent Greece in the Eurovision Song Contest 2004, adding that Kalimeris and Rouvas would be meeting to discuss a duet with Eurostar winner Psichramis. However, the duet never materialised as Bokota stated that with the late finish of Eurostar, Terzis was unable to compose a song that would be a good fit for Psichramis. Nevertheless, it was later revealed that Psichramis as well as the second and third place finalists of Eurostar would serve as backing vocalists for Rouvas.

Rouvas' song for the contest was revealed during a special program on NET on 20 March 2004. Presented by Bokota, the show saw Rouvas joined by two dancers and the three Eurostar finalists performing "Shake It", written by Terzis and lyricist Nektarios Tyrakis. The event also featured a performance by Mando, who represented Greece in 2003, singing her entry "Never Let You Go", as well as Psichramis performing "All Right", his upcoming solo release.

=== Promotion ===
To promote the entry, Rouvas took part in the annual Arion Music Awards in Greece in late March, where he was joined by Greek representatives from previous Eurovision Song Contests. He performed "Shake It" during the event, where he also received the award for Best Male Pop Singer. To further promote the entry, a music video for "Shake It" was filmed on the Greek island of Santorini in April 2004. It was first presented to the public during a farewell event hosted by sponsor Vodafone in Athens on 3 May before the singer left for the contest in Istanbul. The video was later posted online for viewing by 9 May. Rouvas also embarked on a promotional tour, visiting many countries that were to participate in the contest. On 14 April, he visited Helsinki, Finland where he was interviewed on the Finnish-Swedish television channel FST's talk show Bettina S.. This was followed by several radio interviews on stations including Radio Vega and Radio Sputnik. The visit concluded with a performance of "Shake It" at the Hercules nightclub. Additional countries on his tour included Lithuania, Malta, France, Spain, and the United Kingdom.

== At Eurovision ==
The Eurovision Song Contest 2004 took place at Abdi İpekçi Arena in Istanbul, Turkey, and consisted of a semi-final on 12 May and the final on 15 May 2004. For the first time, a semi-final round was introduced to accommodate the influx of nations that wanted to compete in the contest. As Greece had not finished in the top 11 at the 2003 contest the previous year, its song had to compete in the semi-final. According to the Eurovision rules, all participating countries, except the host nation and the "Big Four", consisting of France, Germany, Spain and the United Kingdom, were required to qualify from the semi-final to compete for the final, although the top 10 countries from the semi-final progress to the final. Greece was set to compete in the semi-final of the Eurovision Song Contest 2004 at position 10, following Monaco and preceding Ukraine. Bokota provided commentary for the broadcast within Greece, a task she had performed for ERT since the 1999 contest.

=== Performances ===
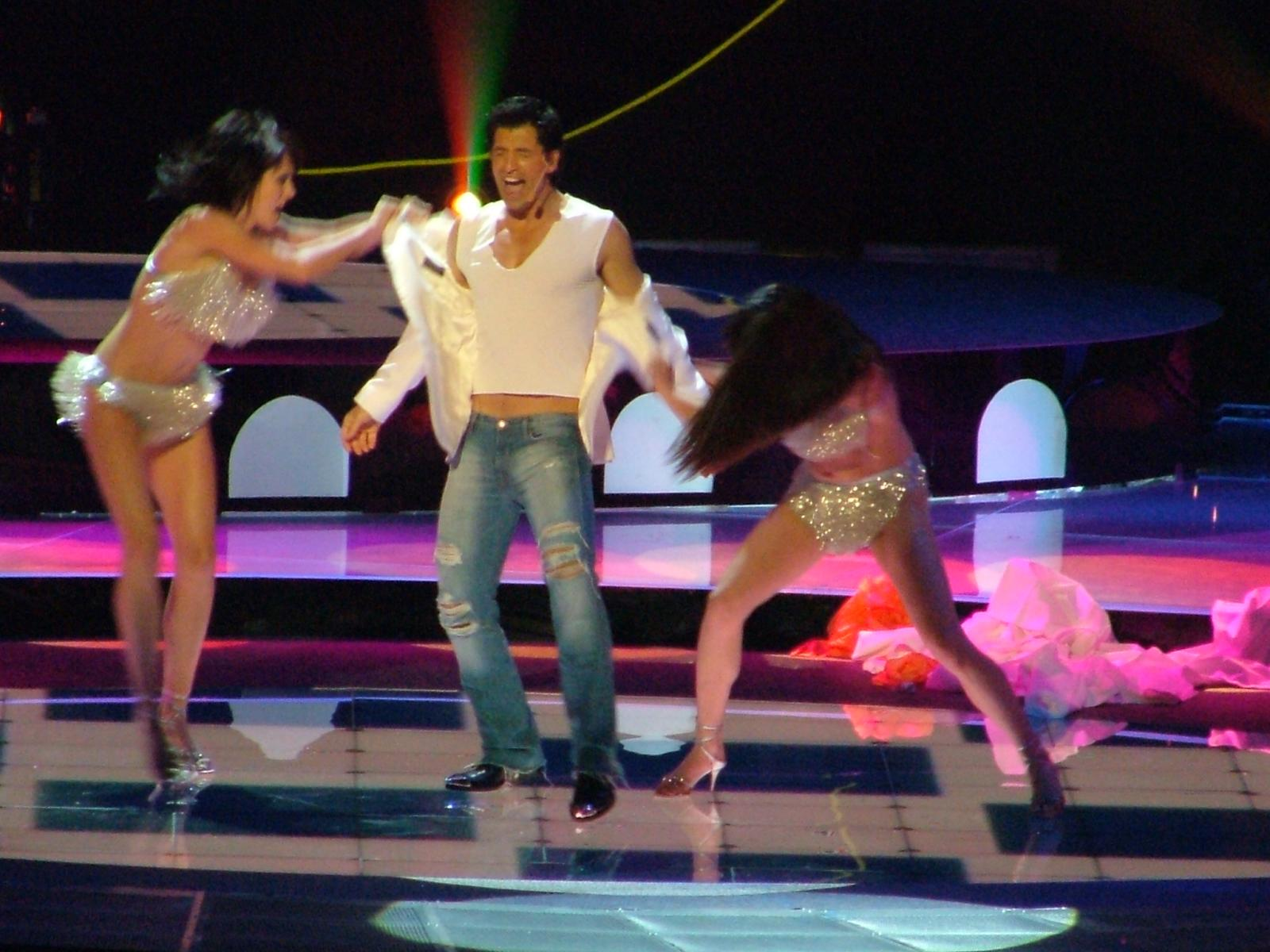
Rouvas performing "Shake It" at the Eurovision Song Contest 2004 in Istanbul on 15 May 2004.

The stage presence for "Shake It" was choreographed by Fokas Evangelinos, and included Rouvas with two female dancers and the three Eurostar finalists as backing vocalists. "Shake It" was performed 10th following Monaco's "Notre planète" by Maryon and preceding Ukraine's "Wild Dances" by Ruslana. At the close of voting, it had received 238 points, placing third in the 22-strong field and qualifying for the final. At the final, held three days later, the nation appeared 16th following Macedonia's "Life" by Toše Proeski and preceding Iceland's "Heaven" by Jónsi. At the close of voting, it had received 252 points, placing third in a field of 24. This matched Greece's best placing to this point, which it has received in 2001.

=== Voting ===
Below is a breakdown of points awarded to Greece in the semi-final and final of the Eurovision Song Contest 2004, as well as by the nation on both occasions. Voting during the two shows involved each country awarding a set of points from 1–8, 10 and 12 based on results from their respective public televote. In the semi-final, Greece placed third with a total of 238 points, including the top 12 from seven nations: Albania, Cyprus, Israel, Malta, Romania, Turkey and United Kingdom. In the final, the nation's 252 points included five sets of 12 points from Albania, Cyprus, Malta, Romania and the United Kingdom. For both the semi-final and final, Greece awarded its 12 points to Cyprus.

Following the release of the televoting figures by the EBU after the conclusion of the competition, it was revealed that a total of 255,918 televotes were cast in Greece during the two shows: 63,354 votes during the semi-final and 192,564 votes during the final.

==== Points awarded to Greece ====
Points awarded to Greece (Semi-final)
| Score | Country |
|---|---|
| 12 points | Albania; Cyprus; Israel; Malta; Romania; Turkey; United Kingdom |
| 10 points | Belgium; Germany; Serbia and Montenegro; Ukraine |
| 8 points | Andorra; Belarus; Lithuania; Portugal |
| 7 points | Macedonia; Spain |
| 6 points | Croatia; Iceland; Latvia; Netherlands |
| 5 points | Austria; Bosnia and Herzegovina; Finland; Norway |
| 4 points | Estonia; Monaco; Slovenia; Sweden |
| 3 points | Denmark; Switzerland |
| 2 points | Ireland |
| 1 point | |

Points awarded to Greece (Final)
| Score | Country |
|---|---|
| 12 points | Albania; Cyprus; Malta; Romania; United Kingdom |
| 10 points | Israel; Lithuania; Monaco; Turkey |
| 8 points | Andorra; Belgium; Ukraine |
| 7 points | Croatia; Germany; Latvia; Macedonia; Poland; Russia; Serbia and Montenegro; Spain |
| 6 points | Belarus; Finland; France; Iceland; Netherlands; Portugal; Slovenia |
| 5 points | Bosnia and Herzegovina; Estonia; Ireland |
| 4 points | Sweden; Switzerland |
| 3 points | Denmark |
| 2 points | Austria; Norway |
| 1 point | |

==== Points awarded by Greece ====
Points awarded by Greece (Semi-final)
| Score | Country |
|---|---|
| 12 points | Cyprus |
| 10 points | Serbia and Montenegro |
| 8 points | Albania |
| 7 points | Ukraine |
| 6 points | Netherlands |
| 5 points | Finland |
| 4 points | Macedonia |
| 3 points | Israel |
| 2 points | Lithuania |
| 1 point | Malta |

Points awarded by Greece (Final)
| Score | Country |
|---|---|
| 12 points | Cyprus |
| 10 points | Albania |
| 8 points | Serbia and Montenegro |
| 7 points | Ukraine |
| 6 points | Turkey |
| 5 points | Austria |
| 4 points | Poland |
| 3 points | Spain |
| 2 points | Russia |
| 1 point | Malta |
