= Serbia and Montenegro in the Eurovision Song Contest 2004 =

- Eurovision Song Contest 2004
- Participating broadcaster: Udruženje javnih radija i televizija (UJRT)
- Country: Serbia and Montenegro
- Selection process: Evropesma-Europjesma 2004
- Selection date: 21 February 2004

Competing entry
- Song: "Lane moje"
- Artist: Željko Joksimović and Ad-Hoc Orchestra
- Songwriters: Željko Joksimović; Leontina Vukomanović

Placement
- Semi-final result: Qualified (1st, 263 points)
- Final result: 2nd, 263 points

Participation chronology

Serbia and Montenegro was represented at the Eurovision Song Contest 2004 with the song "Lane moje", composed by Željko Joksimović, with lyrics by Leontina Vukomanović, and performed by Željko Joksimović and the Ad-Hoc Orchestra. The Serbian-Montenegrin participant broadcaster, Udruženje javnih radija i televizija (UJRT), (Note: The union of public broadcasters of Serbia and Montenegro: Radio-televizija Srbije (RTS) of Serbia and Radio-televizija Crne Gore (RTCG) of Montenegro.) organised the national final Evropesma-Europjesma 2004 in order to select its entry for the contest.

A total of twenty-four entries competed in the national final held on 21 February 2004. "Lane moje" performed by Željko Joksimović was selected as the winner following the combination of votes from an eight-member jury panel and a public televote.

Serbia and Montenegro competed in the semi-final of the Eurovision Song Contest which took place on 12 May 2004. Performing during the show in position 20, "Lane moje" was announced among the top 10 entries of the semi-final and therefore qualified to compete in the final on 14 May. It was later revealed that Serbia and Montenegro placed first out of the 22 participating countries in the semi-final with 263 points. In the final, Serbia and Montenegro performed in position 5 and placed second out of the 24 participating countries, scoring 263 points.

== Background ==
The union of public broadcasters of Serbia and Montenegro, Udruženje javnih radija i televizija (UJRT), confirmed its intentions to debut at the Eurovision Song Contest in its 2004 edition after an application was submitted to take part in 2003 but was rejected due to late changes to the relegation procedure. UJRT would organise the selection process for its entry in the contest, with Radio-televizija Srbije (RTS) and Radio-televizija Crne Gore (RTCG) broadcasting the event within their respective republics. A national final titled Evropesma-Europjesma was used in order to select their 2004 entry.

Entries from Serbia and Montenegro had previously participated in the Eurovision Song Contest from 1961 to 1992 as part of Yugoslavia.

== Before Eurovision ==
=== Beovizija 2004 ===
Beovizija 2004 was the second edition of Beovizija. In 2004, the festival was used as the Serbian semi-final for Evropesma 2004, the national selection organised by UJRT to select the Serbian-Montenegrin entry in the Eurovision Song Contest 2004. It was held on February 20 at the Sava Center in Belgrade. The ceremonies were hosted by Aleksandar Srećković and Ksenija Balaban. The top 4 songs qualified for the final - they were chosen by 9 jury members (8 individuals and televoting/SMS voting being the 9th member). Negative, Leontina, Boris Režak, and Nataša Kojić qualified for Evropesma.

==== Competing entries ====
Beovizija 2004 participants
Artist	Song	Songwriter(s)
Agata	"Na dlanu"	Mihailo Ignjatović; Dragan Urošević
Aco Regina	"U prolazu"	Zoran Lesendrić; P. Milutinović
Boris Režak	"Zauvijek"	Aleksandra Milutinović
Braco	"Meni ćeš doći"	Saša Popović; Jelena Trifunović
Danijela Vranić	"Telo uz telo"	Aleksandar Milić; Jelena Trifunović; Aleksandar Marjan
Darko	"Samo ti"	Dragana Jovanović; Jelena Trifunović
Denis i Obule	"Tvoje oči žive"	Nena Leković
Đogani	"Od 1 do 10"	Petar Stanković
Zorana	"Lepo vreme u Beogradu"	Aleksandar Kobac; Svetlana Slavković
Igor Tasovac	"Staro srebro"	Step Energy Team; Ljiljana Jorgovanović
Ivana Knežević	"Zabranjeni ples"	Marko Kon; Svetlana Slavković
Jelena Jevremović	"Ljubav u prahu"	Branislav Opačić; Aleksandar Tomić
Jelena Karleuša i Vreli reperi	"Moli me"	Aleksandar Tomić; Marko Peruničić
Jelena Popović	"Nervoza"	N. Đinović
Yo	"Džemper"	Zoran Živanović; Jelena Živanović
Koktel bend and Orkestar Bobana Markovića	"Grmi, seva"	Saša Milošević
Ksenija Ivanović	"Prokleti ponedeljak"	Goran Ratković; V. Petković
Leontina	"Zamisli"	Željko Joksimović; Leontina Vukomanović
Luna	"222"	Čeda Čvorak
Maja Nikolić i Ceca Slavković	"Poslednja odbrana"	Marko Kon; Svetlana Slavković
Marko Jeftić	"Jedna više"	Srđan Simić Kamba; Marko Jeftić
Martin Vučić	"Opraštam ti sve"	Slobodan Marković; Nebojša Radosavljević; A. Bilbilovski
Mina Lazarević	"Namerno"	Goran Stanković; Svetlana Slavković; Marko Kon
Nataša Kojić	"Oko plavo"	Nataša Kojić; Fajo
Negative	"Zbunjena"	Negative; Ivana Pavlović
Noć i dan	"Svašta mi se desilo"	Saša Dragić; Saša Rađenović
Suzana Petričević	"Nikada više"	M. Krstić; Suzana Petričević
Husa	"Erogena zona"	Husein Alijević

==== Final ====
Beovizija 2004 - 20 February 2004
R/O	Artist	Song	Jury	Televote	Total	Place
1	Agata	"Na dlanu"	11	0	11	13
2	Marko Jeftić	"Jedna više"	1	0	1	22
3	Zorana	"Lepo vreme u Beogradu"	8	0	8	16
4	Husa	"Erogena zona"	0	0	0	25
5	Mina Lazarević	"Namerno"	9	0	9	15
6	Nataša Kojić	"Moje oko plavo"	59	0	59	4
7	Suzana Petričević	"Nikad više"	2	0	2	21
8	Jelena Karleuša	"Moli me"	7	6	13	11
9	Negative	"Zbunjena"	70	9	79	1
10	Danijela Vranić	"Telo uz telo"	5	0	5	17
11	Martin Vučić	"Opraštam ti sve"	14	0	14	10
12	Leontina	"Zamisli"	56	8	64	3
13	Denis and Obule	"Tvoje oči žive"	25	2	27	6
14	Maja Nikolić and Ceca Slavković	"Otrov u malim bočicama"	0	3	3	19
15	Luna	"222"	19	4	23	7
16	Aco Regina	"U prolazu"	3	0	3	19
17	Koktel bend and Orkestar Bobana Markovića	"Grmi, seva"	39	7	46	5
18	Braco	"Meni ćeš doći"	0	0	0	25
19	Ksenija Ivanović	"Prokleti ponedeljak"	15	1	16	9
20	Darko	"Samo ti"	0	0	0	25
21	Ivana Knežević	"Zabranjeni ples"	1	0	1	22
22	Noć i Dan	"Svašta mi se desilo"	11	0	11	13
23	Đogani	"Od 1 do 10"	4	0	4	18
24	Jelena Popović	"Nervoza"	1	0	1	22
25	Boris Režak	"Zauvijek"	61	5	66	2
26	Yo	"Džemper"	17	0	17	8
27	Igor Tasovac	"Staro srebro"	0	0	0	25
28	Jelena Jevremović	"Ljubav u prahu"	2	10	12	12

=== Evropesma-Europjesma 2004 ===
Evropesma-Europjesma 2004 was the national final organised by UJRT in order to select the Serbian–Monetengrin entry for the Eurovision Song Contest 2004. The competition took place at the Sava Centar in Belgrade on 21 February 2004, hosted by Aleksandar Bojović and Nina Mudrinić. The show was broadcast in Serbia on RTS 1 and RTS Sat as well as streamed online via the broadcaster's website rts.co.yu, and in Montenegro on TVCG 1 and TVCG Sat.

==== Competing entries ====
UJRT together with the two broadcasters in Serbia and Montenegro, Serbian broadcaster RTS and Montenegrin broadcaster RTCG, each conducted separate selections in order to select the twenty-four entries to proceed to the national final: UJRT submitted sixteen entries, RTCG submitted four entries, while RTS organised Beovizija 2004 on 20 February 2004 where twenty-eight songs competed with the top four entries qualifying for the national final. Among the competing artists was Extra Nena who represented Yugoslavia in 1992.

Artist	Song	Songwriter(s)	Broadcaster
Ana Milenković	"Takva žena" (Таква жена)	Kristina Kovač, Aleksandra Kovač	UJRT
Andrijana and Marija Božović	"Ni jedna suza" (Ни једна суза)	Milan Perić, Mirsad Serhatlić	RTCG
Boris Režak	"Zauvijek" (Заувијек)	Aleksandra Milutinović	RTS
Evropa	"Evropa" (Европа)	Slobo Kovačević	RTCG
Extra Nena	"More ljubavi" (Море љубави)	Aleksandar Filipović, Vladimir Agić	UJRT
Jelena Tomašević	"Kad ne bude tvoje ljubavi" (Кад не буде твоје љубави)	Rastko Aksentijević	UJRT
Jovana Nikolić	"Posle tebe" (После тебе)	Vladimir Graić, Marko Kon, Svetlana Slavković-Ceca, Aleksandar Kobac	UJRT
Knez	"Navika" (Навика)	Snežana Vukomanović, Nenad Knežević	UJRT
Leontina	"Zamisli" (Замисли)	Leontina Vukomanović, Željko Joksimović	RTS
Madame Piano	"Igra" (Игра)	Madame Piano, Dejan Momčilović	UJRT
Mari Mari	"Kad ponos ubije ljubav" (Кад понос убије љубав)	Mari Mari, Uroš Marković	UJRT
Mogul	"Ne trgujem osećanjima" (Не тргујем осећањима)	Nena Leković, Zoran Leković	UJRT
Nataša Kojić	"Oko plavo" (Око плаво)	Nataša Kojić	RTS
Negative	"Zbunjena" (Збуњена)	Ivana Pavlović, Negativ	RTS
Negre	"K'o nijedna druga" (К'о ниједна друга)	Kaja, Dejan Božović	RTCG
Peti element	"Reka bez povratka" (Река без повратка)	Kristina Kovač, Spomenka Kovač	UJRT
Saša Dragaš	"Dao bih sve" (Дао бих све)	Jelena Zana, Zika Zana	UJRT
Saša Vasić	"Priznaj" (Признај)	Saša Vasić	UJRT
Sergej Ćetković	"Ne mogu da ti oprostim" (Не могу да ти опростим)	Sergej Ćetković	RTCG
Slobodan Bajić	"Možeš da me ne voliš" (Можеш да ме не волиш)	Aleksandra Milutinović	UJRT
Tanja Banjanin	"Istina" (Истина)	Vesna Popov, Zoran Popov	UJRT
Tanja Jovićević	"Uzmi me" (Узми ме)	Ruža Jeremić, Dragana Jovanović	UJRT
Teodora Bojović and Night Shift	"Daj mi snage" (Дај ми снаге)	Teodora Bojović, Night Shift	UJRT
Željko Joksimović	"Lane moje" (Лане моје)	Leontina Vukomanović, Željko Joksimović	UJRT

==== Final ====
The final took place on 21 February 2004 where twenty-four songs competed. The winner, "Lane moje" performed by Željko Joksimović, was decided by a combination of votes from a jury panel (8/9) and the Serbia and Montenegro public via televoting (1/9). The Serbian jury consisted of Vlada Marković, Vojkan Borisavljević, Ana Miličević and Rade Radivojević, while the Montenegrin jury consisted of Nebojša Vujović, Stana Šalgo, Aco Đukanović and Radovan Papović. Former Eurovision contestant Johnny Logan, who won the contest for Ireland in 1980 and 1987, was featured as a guest performer during the show.

Evropesma-Europjesma 2004 – 21 February 2004
R/O	Artist	Song	Jury	Televote	Total	Place
1	Jovana Nikolić	"Posle tebe" (После тебе)	21	2	23	10
2	Teodora Bojović and Night Shift	"Daj mi snage" (Дај ми снаге)	33	0	33	6
3	Evropa	"Evropa" (Европа)	29	8	37	5
4	Extra Nena	"More ljubavi" (Море љубави)	15	0	15	12
5	Saša Vasić	"Priznaj" (Признај)	8	0	8	15
6	Jelena Tomašević	"Kad ne bude tvoje ljubavi" (Кад не буде твоје љубави)	20	0	20	11
7	Slobodan Bajić	"Možeš da me ne voliš" (Можеш да ме не волиш)	4	0	4	19
8	Ana Milenković	"Takva žena" (Таква жена)	6	0	6	18
9	Tanja Banjanin	"Istina" (Истина)	0	0	0	22
10	Boris Režak	"Zauvijek" (Заувијек)	0	0	0	22
11	Knez	"Navika" (Навика)	7	0	7	17
12	Negre	"K'o nijedna druga"	37	9	46	3
13	Madam Piano	"Igra" (Игра)	25	0	25	9
14	Negative	"Zbunjena" (Збуњена)	38	6	44	4
15	Tanja Jovićević	"Uzmi me" (Узми ме)	8	0	8	15
16	Saša Dragaš	"Dao bih sve" (Дао бих све)	0	0	0	22
17	Sergej Ćetković	"Ne mogu da ti oprostim" (Не могу да ти опростим)	20	7	27	8
18	Željko Joksimović	"Lane moje" (Лане моје)	74	10	84	1
19	Leontina	"Zamisli" (Замисли)	12	3	15	12
20	Peti element	"Reka bez povratka" (Река без повратка)	43	4	47	2
21	Nataša Kojić	"Oko plavo" (Око плаво)	0	1	1	21
22	Mogul	"Ne trgujem osećanjima" (Не тргујем осећањима)	3	0	3	20
23	Mari Mari	"Kad ponos ubije ljubav" (Кад понос убије љубав)	9	0	9	14
24	Andrijana and Marija Božović	"Ni jedna suza" (Ни једна суза)	24	5	29	7

Detailed Jury Votes
R/O	Song	RTS				RTCG				Total
R/O	Song	V. Marković	V. Borisavljević	A. Miličević	R. Radivojević	N. Vujović	S. Šalgo	A. Đukanović	R. Papović	Total
1	"Posle tebe"	3			7	1	2	6	2	21
2	"Daj mi snage"	8	5	8	8	4				33
3	"Evropa"					9	4	8	8	29
4	"More ljubavi"	4	4		5			2		15
5	"Priznaj"					8				8
6	"Kad ne bude tvoje ljubavi"	6	7	5	2					20
7	"Možeš da me ne voliš"						3		1	4
8	"Takva žena"	2	1	2	1					6
9	"Istina"									0
10	"Zauvijek"									0
11	"Navika"							3	4	7
12	"K'o nijedna druga"					10	9	9	9	37
13	"Igra"	7	8	6	4					25
14	"Zbunjena"	10	9	10	9					38
15	"Uzmi me"		2	3		2	1			8
16	"Dao bih sve"									0
17	"Ne mogu da ti oprostim"					5	5	5	5	20
18	"Lane moje"	9	10	9	10	6	10	10	10	74
19	"Zamisli"			4			8			12
20	"Reka bez povratka"	5	6	7	6	3	6	4	6	43
21	"Oko plavo"									0
22	"Ne trgujem osećanjima"				3					3
23	"Kad ponos ubije ljubav"	1	3	1				1	3	9
24	"Ni jedna suza"					7	7	7	7	24

=== Controversy ===
The competition caused some controversy as the Montenegrin acts did not receive any points from the Serbian jurors, while the Serbian Beovizija 2004 winner and runner-up, Negative and Boris Režak, did not receive any points from the Montenegrin jurors. However, the eventual winner Željko Joksimović received high points from both the Serbian and Montenegrin jurors.

== At Eurovision ==
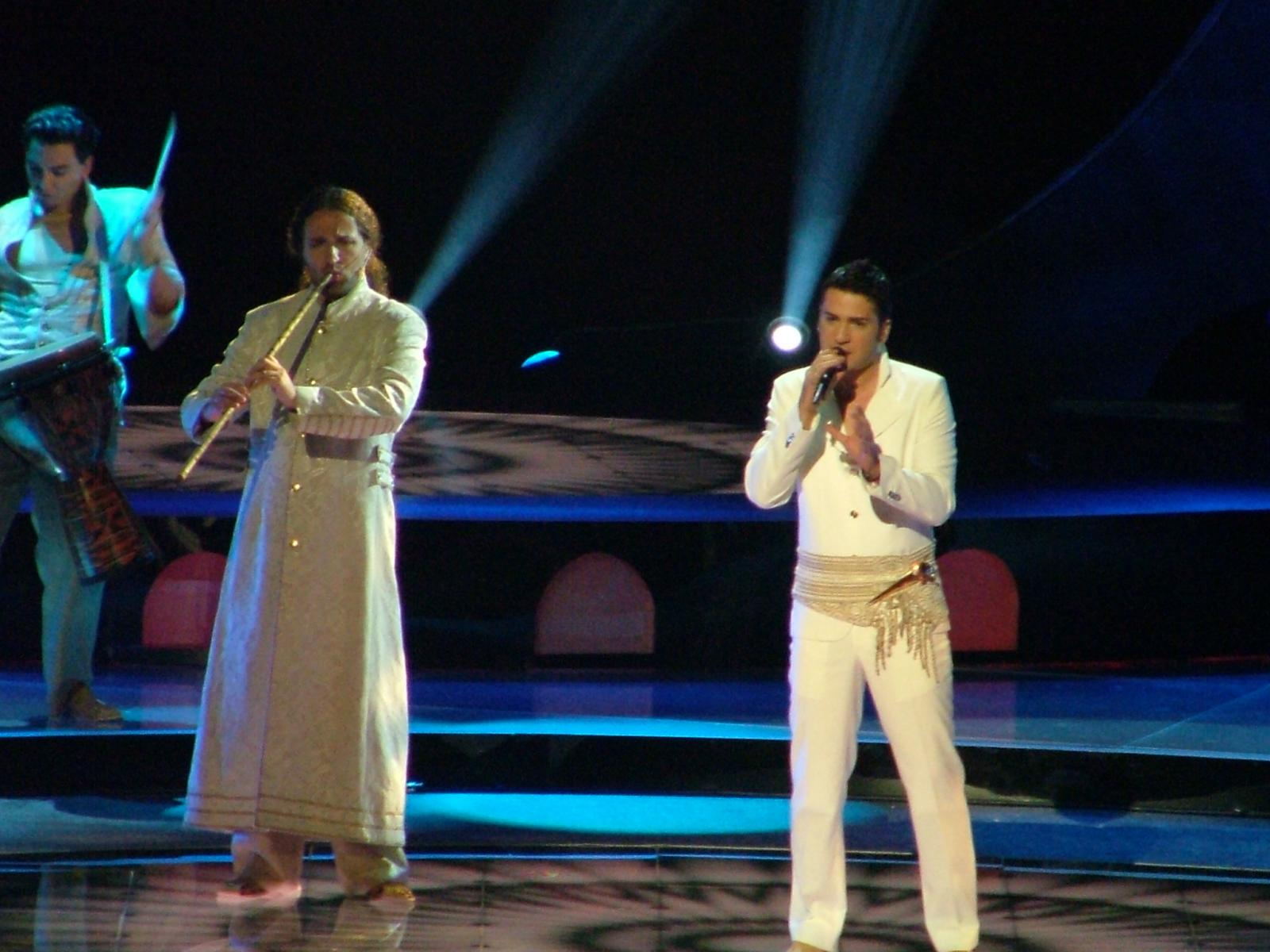
Željko Joksimović and the Ad-Hoc Orchestra during a rehearsal before the semi-final

It was announced that the competition's format would be expanded to include a semi-final in 2004. According to the rules, all nations with the exceptions of the host country, the "Big Four" (France, Germany, Spain and the United Kingdom) and the ten highest placed finishers in the 2003 contest are required to qualify from the semi-final on 12 May 2004 in order to compete for the final on 15 May 2004; the top ten countries from the semi-final progress to the final. On 23 March 2004, a special allocation draw was held which determined the running order for the semi-final and Serbia and Montenegro was set to perform in position 20, following the entry from Denmark and before the entry from Bosnia and Herzegovina. At the end of the semi-final, Serbia was announced as having finished in the top 10 and subsequently qualifying for the grand final. It was later revealed that Serbia placed first in the semi-final, receiving a total of 263 points.

The draw for the running order of the final was decided during the announcement of the ten qualifying countries and Serbia and Montenegro was subsequently placed to perform in position 5, following the entry from France and before the entry from Malta. Serbia and Montenegro placed second in the final, scoring 263 points.

The semi-final and the final were broadcast in Serbia on RTS 1 and RTS Sat with commentary by Duška Vučinić-Lučić, and in Montenegro on TVCG 2 and TVCG Sat with commentary by Dražen Bauković and Tamara Ivanković. UJRT appointed Nataša Miljković as its spokesperson to announce the votes of Serbia and Montenegro during the final.

=== Voting ===
Below is a breakdown of points awarded to Serbia and Montenegro and awarded by Serbia and Montenegro in the semi-final and grand final of the contest. The nation awarded its 12 points to Macedonia in the semi-final and the final of the contest.

Following the release of the televoting figures by the EBU after the conclusion of the competition, it was revealed that a total of 26,433 televotes were cast in Serbia and Montenegro during the two shows: 20,909 votes in the final and 5,524 votes in the semi-final.

==== Points awarded to Serbia and Montenegro ====
Points awarded to Serbia and Montenegro (Semi-final)
Score	Country
12 points	Austria; Bosnia and Herzegovina; Croatia; Germany; Netherlands; Slovenia; Sweden; Switzerland; Ukraine
10 points	Belarus; Cyprus; Denmark; Finland; Greece; Macedonia; Norway; Portugal; Romania
8 points	Israel; Spain; United Kingdom
7 points	Belgium; Monaco; Turkey
6 points	Ireland
5 points	
4 points	Albania; Latvia; Malta
3 points	
2 points	
1 point	Andorra; Lithuania

Points awarded to Serbia and Montenegro (Final)
Score	Country
12 points	Austria; Bosnia and Herzegovina; Croatia; Slovenia; Sweden; Switzerland; Ukraine
10 points	Cyprus; Finland; France; Germany; Macedonia; Netherlands; Russia
8 points	Greece; Romania; Turkey
7 points	Albania; Belarus; Denmark; Iceland; Israel; Portugal
6 points	Malta; Norway; Spain
5 points	Latvia; Poland
4 points	
3 points	Belgium; Ireland; United Kingdom
2 points	Andorra; Lithuania
1 point	Estonia; Monaco

==== Points awarded by Serbia and Montenegro ====
Points awarded by Serbia and Montenegro (Semi-final)
Score	Country
12 points	Macedonia
10 points	Greece
8 points	Ukraine
7 points	Bosnia and Herzegovina
6 points	Albania
5 points	Croatia
4 points	Estonia
3 points	Israel
2 points	Cyprus
1 point	Netherlands

Points awarded by Serbia and Montenegro (Final)
Score	Country
12 points	Macedonia
10 points	Ukraine
8 points	Albania
7 points	Greece
6 points	Bosnia and Herzegovina
5 points	Croatia
4 points	Sweden
3 points	Cyprus
2 points	Turkey
1 point	Russia
