= Re-union (duo) =

Dutch musical duo

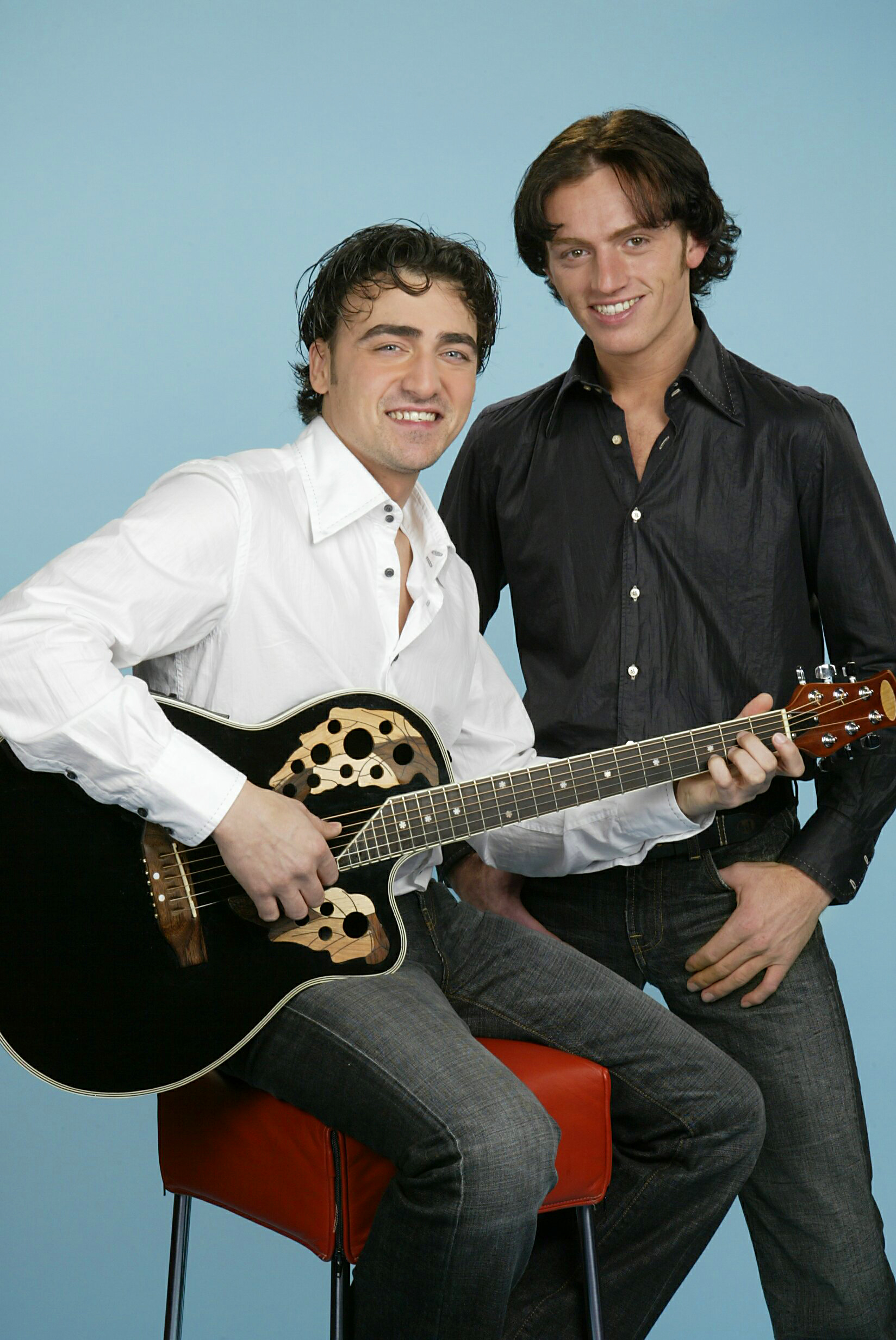
- Pennisi and De Corte in 2004

Background information
- Origin: Netherlands
- Genres: Pop music
- Years active: 2003–2005
- Members: Paul de Corte; Fabrizio Pennisi

Re-union was a short-lived Dutch musical duo, known for representing the Netherlands in the Eurovision Song Contest 2004 with the song "Without You". It consisted of Dutch singer Paul de Corte (born 28 February 1979) and Italian-born Belgian singer and guitarist Fabrizio Pennisi (born 29 September 1979).

== History ==
Pennisi was a founding member of the Dutch boy band All Of Us, formed in 1998, which De Corte joined in 2001. The band split up in late 2002, but De Corte and Pennisi remained friends and were offered the chance to perform the song "Without You" as a duo in the Nationaal Songfestival, the Dutch selection for the Eurovision Song Contest, in 2004. After advancing from the first semi-final, they performed in the final on 22 February, where "Without You" was chosen as the winner.

Due to the increasing number of countries wishing to participate in the Eurovision Song Contest, it had been decided that a semi-final would be introduced in the 2004 contest. As the Netherlands had not placed in the top 10 in 2003, it was one of the countries obliged to participate in the semi-final, which took place on 12 May in Istanbul, Turkey. Re-union was drawn to perform last of the 22 countries and finished in sixth place, thereby qualifying for the final on 15 May. In the final, however, with a less fortuitous performance draw, "Without You" only reached 20th place out of 24 entries. After the 2004 finals, it would last until 2013 for the Netherlands to qualify for a Eurovision final again.

"Without You" reached number 12 on the Dutch singles chart, and in September 2004 the duo released a follow-up, "If You Love Somebody", which peaked at number 36. Shortly after, De Corte and Pennisi went their separate ways.

Awards and achievements
Preceded by Esther Hart with "One More Night"	Netherlands in the Eurovision Song Contest; 2004	Succeeded by Glennis Grace with "My Impossible Dream"
