= Mickey Joe Harte =

Irish singer-songwriter (born 1973)

Mickey Harte
- Also known as: MickyJoe
- Born: Michael Joseph Harte; 21 August 1973 (age 53); Lifford, County Donegal, Ireland
- Genres: Pop; Pop rock
- Occupation: Singer-songwriter
- Years active: 1993–present
- Label: Swerve Music Ltd.
- Website: mickeyjoeharte.com

Michael Joseph "Mickey Joe" Harte (born 21 August 1973), is an Irish singer-songwriter. He represented Ireland in the Eurovision Song Contest in 2003 with the song "We've Got the World".

== Early life ==
Harte hails from Lifford, County Donegal. As a teenager during the 1980s Harte had an epiphany – "Because the moment I lifted a guitar and wrote my first song I knew I was creative", he has said. He started playing guitar at the age of 13. His first song, called "Candlelight", was inspired by Operation Desert Storm, the 1991 U.S invasion of Iraq. He later paid for the recording of his first extended play (EP). His mother, a poet, has had her work set to music by her son.

== Career ==
Harte entered the Raidió Teilifís Éireann (RTÉ) television show You're a Star in 2002. The show set records for Irish TV ratings over the period of November 2002 to March 2003 and Harte came out on top, earning the opportunity to represent Ireland at Eurovision Song Contest 2003 in Riga. In Riga he performed "We've Got the World" (written by Martin Brannigan and Keith Molloy). He finished in eleventh place in the competition. "We've Got the World" reached number one on the Irish Singles Chart.

In 2003, Harte recorded a cover version of Beyoncé's "Crazy in Love" for Even Better than the Real Thing Vol. 1, and in 2004 a cover version of Eamon's "Fuck It (I Don't Want You Back)" (albeit without the "Fuck It" part).

In 2006, Harte released his second studio album, Live and Learn.

In 2007, Harte appeared on Celebrities Go Wild, an RTÉ reality television show in which eight celebrities had to fend for themselves in the wilds of rural Connemara.

In 2011, Harte released his third album "Forward to Reality". The album was recorded in Chicago (USA) and produced by John Condron.

He performed at Croke Park during half-time in the 2012 All-Ireland Senior Football Championship semi-final between Cork and Donegal. After Donegal won the Sam Maguire Cup the next month, he performed at their homecoming in Donegal.

In 2016 he played Louise Ryan & Úna O Boyle's birthday party to a rapt audience of 60 friends and family on a boat on the river Liffey, Dublin. He also played surprise set for close fans such as Robert Smith in a local Dublin nightclub in late 2016.

Mickey recorded some new material in Bedburg (Germany) which will hopefully released in Autumn 2016. In September he opened up the "12. Musikmeile Bedburg" as support act for singer-songwriter Milow (30,000 people attending the festival).

Mickey's single "For the Broken Hearted" was released on 5 October 2017. The song was recorded in Bedburg, Germany and produced by Dieter Kirchenbauer.

In late 2024, Harte was confirmed as a contestant in the upcoming eight series of the Irish dancing show Dancing with the Stars, which began airing in January 2025. He danced with new professional dancer Daniela Roze. Harte and Roze were eliminated first in the third week of the programme.

== Personal life ==
Harte is married to Louise Harte. The couple have four children: Kayleigh, Kyle, Percy and Cristian.

Awards and achievements
Preceded by Gary O'Shaughnessy with "Without Your Love"	Ireland in the Eurovision Song Contest; 2003	Succeeded by Chris Doran with "If My World Stopped Turning"
Preceded by None	Winner of You're a Star; 2003	Succeeded by Chris Doran
