= Chris Doran =

Irish singer

Christopher Doran (born 22 November 1979) is an Irish singer from Waterford. He was the winner of Ireland's You're a Star 2003-2004 talent search competition to find Ireland's Eurovision Song Contest entry. The competition held auditions throughout Ireland, and the winners went through to the final stages, with one act eventually decided on. The show was aired on RTÉ. He went on to represent Ireland in the Eurovision Song Contest 2004 with "If My World Stopped Turning".He now performs as part of The Nooks Band.

== Eurovision 2004 ==
Chris Doran won the competition You're a Star with his song "If My World Stopped Turning" Doran sang the song accompanied onstage by singing group Final 4, who had also participated in the competition.

Doran, along with Final 4, represented Ireland in the Eurovision Song Contest 2004, in Istanbul, Turkey in May 2004 with the song "If My World Stopped Turning" finishing 22nd out of 24.

The single however became a big hit in Ireland, where it topped the charts for two weeks.

== Recent career ==
Doran went on to release a number of other singles, scoring five Irish hits in total. He also released an album in 2004. He was on the judging panel for a reality talent show, entitled "Sony Centre Star Search", on Waterford's WLR FM in 2006. He has also completed some recording work in the United States, having worked with producer Joe Staxx.

== Personal life ==
Chris Doran was born into a large family of the travelling community. His father died when he was a year old. Doran became a kickboxer in his youth and won many awards for this. He also worked as a builder before his music career took off.

In June 2013 Chris Doran was one of eight people brought to a special sitting of Carrick-on-Suir district court following a row on a street in Carrick-on-Suir and was charged with affray.

== Discography ==
=== Albums ===
Year	Title	IRL
2004	Right Here	

=== Singles ===
Year	Title	IRL
2004	"If My World Stopped Turning"	1
2004	"Nothing's Gonna Change My Love for You"	2
2004	"Right Here Waiting"	8
2006	"All of the Above"	22
2006	"You Know You Want It"	24
2008	"Hey Girl"	—

Awards and achievements
Preceded by Mickey Harte with "We've Got the World"	Ireland in the Eurovision Song Contest; 2004	Succeeded by Donna and Joe with "Love?"
Preceded by Mickey Joe Harte	Winner of You're a Star; 2004	Succeeded by Donna and Joe
