= Cyprus in the Eurovision Song Contest 2004 =

- Eurovision Song Contest 2004
- Participating broadcaster: Cyprus Broadcasting Corporation (CyBC)
- Country: Cyprus
- Selection process: National final
- Selection date: 17 February 2004

Competing entry
- Song: "Stronger Every Minute"
- Artist: Lisa Andreas
- Songwriters: Mike Connaris

Placement
- Semi-final result: Qualified (5th, 149 points)
- Final result: 5th, 170 points

Participation chronology

Cyprus was represented at the Eurovision Song Contest 2004 with the song "Stronger Every Minute", written by Mike Connaris, and performed by Lisa Andreas. The Cypriot participating broadcaster, the Cyprus Broadcasting Corporation (CyBC), selected its entry through a 10-song national final on 17 February 2004. While originally containing some lyrics in Greek, Andreas performed an English-only version of the song at the contest. Songwriter Connaris had twice written a runner up in Eurovision selection process for the United Kingdom.

To promote the entry, a music video was filmed in the United Kingdom and released prior to the contest. Cyprus was drawn to compete 14th in the contest's semi-final, held on 12 May 2004 and placed fifth, qualifying for the 15 May final. At the final, the nation's entry was performed 21st on the night and placed fifth out of the 24 competing entries with 170 points.

== Background ==
Prior to the 2004 contest, the Cyprus Broadcasting Corporation (CyBC) had participated in the Eurovision Song Contest representing Cyprus 21 times since its debut in the 1981 contest. Since then, it has only not participated twice in the annual event: in the 1988 contest when its selected song "Thimame" by Yiannis Dimitrou was disqualified for being previously released and the 2001 contest when it was relegated. By 2004, the Cyprus' best placing was fifth, which it achieved twice: in 1982 with the song "Mono i agapi" performed by Anna Vissi and in 1997 with "Mana mou" performed by Hara and Andreas Constantinou. The country's least successful result was in 1986 when it placed last with the song "Tora zo" by Elpida, receiving four points in total. The nation's worst finish in terms of points received; however, was when it placed second to last in 1999 with "Tha'nai erotas" by Marlain Angelidou, receiving only two points.

As part of its duties as participating broadcaster, CyBC organises the selection of its entry in the Eurovision Song Contest and broadcasts the event in the country. In years past, the broadcaster has used a variety of methods to select its entry, including internal selections; however, for the 2004 contest, CyBC opted for a national final.

== Before Eurovision ==
=== National final ===
CyBC announced on 15 October 2003 that it would hold a national final to select its entry for the Eurovision Song Contest 2004. Artists and composers were able to submit their entries to the broadcaster through 2 January 2004; all artists and composers were required to have Cypriot nationality. At the conclusion of the deadline, CyBC had received 62 entries, ten of which were announced on 7 February 2004, as the participants for the national final. All competing entries were English-language songs.

The national final took place on 17 February 2004 at the Pavilion Night Club in Nicosia, hosted by Loukas Hamatsos. "Stronger Every Minute", a power ballad performed by Lisa Andreas, was selected by a combination of votes from public televoting (60%) and a seven-member jury panel (40%). The members of the jury were singer and television presenter Dafni Bokota, music producer Glykeria Andreou, Mamas Hatziantonis of CyBC Radio 3, Vaso Komninou of Politis, Artemis Georgiou of Radio Proto, choreographer Annita Hatjieftychiou and director Stathis Piperidis. In addition to the performances of the competing songs, the show featured guest performances by Stelios Constantas (who represented Cyprus in 2003), Mariada Pieridi, David D'Or (who would represent Israel in 2004), and Linas and Simona (who would represent Lithuania in 2004).

Final – 17 February 2004
R/O	Artist	Song	Songwriter(s)	Points	Place
1	Mary Harki	"Burning Fire"	Michalis Rousos	58	6
2	Mirto Meletiou	"I Need Love"	Paris Meletiou, Chrisanthos Chrisanthou	90	3
3	George Platon	"Millionaire"	George Platon	10	10
4	Eleni Skarpari	"Come to Me"	Michalis Pittas, Eleni Skarpari, Andreas Skarpari	68	5
5	Scorpion	"Tell Me"	Lia Ioannidi	26	9
6	Lefki Stilianou	"Vision of Dreams"	Lefki Stylianou, Andreas Paraskeva	28	8
7	Stefanos Georgiadis	"Cold"	Konstantinos Kountouros	36	7
8	United	"Me"	Aristos Moschovakis, Peter Andre	76	4
9	Georgia Panayiotou	"Analyze Your Love"	Nikos Evangelou, Vangelis Evangelou	92	2
10	Lisa Andreas	"Stronger Every Minute"	Mike Connaris	96	1

=== Promotion ===
About a month after the song's selection, a music video for it was filmed in the United Kingdom and released on 20 March 2004 to serve as promotion. The music video saw Andreas singing alone, her head in focus and in black and white before changing to color about a third of the way through the video.

== At Eurovision ==
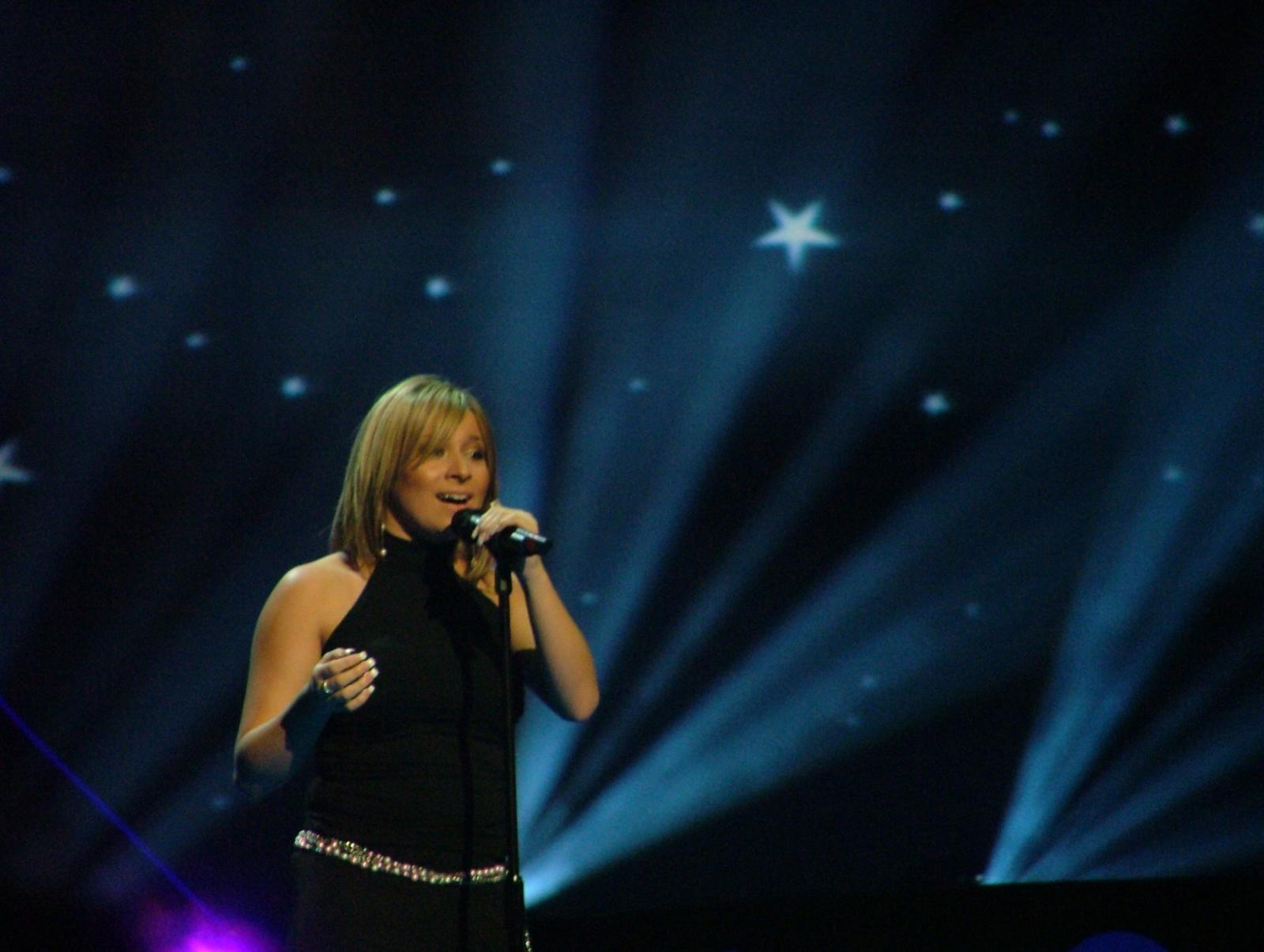
Lisa Andreas in the semi-final of the Eurovision Song Contest 2004

The Eurovision Song Contest 2004 took place at Abdi İpekçi Arena in Istanbul, Turkey, and consisted of a semi-final on 12 May and the final on 15 May 2004. This contest marked the first use of the semi-final round, which was introduced to accommodate the influx of nations that wanted to compete in the contest. According to the Eurovision rules, all participating countries, except the host nation and the "Big Four", consisting of France, Germany, Spain and the United Kingdom, were required to qualify from the semi-final to compete for the final, although the top 10 countries from the semi-final progress to the final. As Cyprus had not finished in the top 10 at the 2003 contest the previous year, its song had to compete in the semi-final. Cyprus was assigned to compete in the semi-final in position 14 in the running order, following Albania and preceding Macedonia.

The Cypriot performance saw Andreas on stage alone with no backing vocalists or dancers. The nation qualified to the final, placing fifth in the semi-final with 149 points. The day of the final, Andreas took part in additional dress rehearsals, including one where she sang a verse of the song in Greek to much fanfare. In the final, Andreas performed 21st, following the United Kingdom and preceding Turkey; at the close of voting, the Cypriot entry had placed fifth, scoring 170 points. This placement allowed Cyprus to automatically qualify for the final of the next year's contest.

=== Voting ===
Below is a breakdown of points awarded to Cyprus in the semi-final and final of the Eurovision Song Contest 2004, as well as by the nation on both occasions. Voting during the two shows involved each country awarding a set of points from 1–8, 10 and 12 based on results from their respective public televote. In the semi-final, Cyprus placed fifth with a total of 149 points, including the top 12 points from Greece and Monaco. In the final, the nation's 170 points included 12 points from Greece. Of the 35 other countries competing, all but three awarded points to "Stronger Every Minute". For both the semi-final and final, Cyprus awarded its 12 points to Greece. CyBC appointed Hamatsos as its spokesperson to present the results of the Cypriot vote during the final, a role he also performed at the previous year's contest. Additionally, "Stronger Every Minute" won Connaris a Marcel Bezençon Award in the composer category, as determined by a jury of participating composers who identified it as the "most original composition".

Following the release of the televoting figures by the EBU after the conclusion of the competition, it was revealed that a total of 172,102 televotes were cast in Cyprus during the two shows: 54,351 votes during the semi-final and 117,751 votes during the final.

==== Points awarded to Cyprus ====
Points awarded to Cyprus (Semi-final)
Score	Country
12 points	Greece; Monaco
10 points	Netherlands; United Kingdom
8 points	Iceland; Ireland
7 points	Finland; Ukraine
6 points	Austria; Belarus; Belgium; Estonia
5 points	Denmark; Malta; Turkey
4 points	Germany; Lithuania; Norway
3 points	Israel; Latvia; Portugal; Slovenia; Sweden
2 points	Andorra; Croatia; Serbia and Montenegro
1 point	Romania; Spain; Switzerland

Points awarded to Cyprus (Final)
Score	Country
12 points	Greece
10 points	Iceland; Ireland; United Kingdom
8 points	Belarus; Germany; Netherlands
7 points	Estonia; Finland; Malta
6 points	Austria; Denmark; Russia; Sweden
5 points	France; Lithuania
4 points	Andorra; Belgium; Croatia; Latvia; Norway; Poland; Ukraine
3 points	Israel; Portugal; Romania; Serbia and Montenegro; Spain
2 points	Monaco; Switzerland
1 point	Slovenia; Turkey

==== Points awarded by Cyprus ====
Points awarded by Cyprus (Semi-final)
Score	Country
12 points	Greece
10 points	Serbia and Montenegro
8 points	Ukraine
7 points	Lithuania
6 points	Finland
5 points	Netherlands
4 points	Monaco
3 points	Denmark
2 points	Israel
1 point	Albania

Points awarded by Cyprus (Final)
Score	Country
12 points	Greece
10 points	Serbia and Montenegro
8 points	Ukraine
7 points	Spain
6 points	Russia
5 points	Sweden
4 points	Turkey
3 points	Romania
2 points	Poland
1 point	Belgium

== Bibliography ==
- O'Connor, John Kennedy (2010). The Eurovision Song Contest: The Official History (2nd ed.). London: Carlton Books. ISBN 978-1-84732-521-1.
