= Netherlands in the Eurovision Song Contest 2004 =

- Eurovision Song Contest 2004
- Participating broadcaster: Nederlandse Omroep Stichting (NOS)
- Country: Netherlands
- Selection process: Nationaal Songfestival 2004
- Selection date: 22 February 2004

Competing entry
- Song: "Without You"
- Artist: Re-union
- Songwriters: Ed van Otterdijk; Angeline van Otterdijk

Placement
- Semi-final result: Qualified (6th, 146 points)
- Final result: 20th, 11 points

Participation chronology

The Netherlands was represented at the Eurovision Song Contest 2004 with the song "Without You", composed by Ed van Otterdijk, with lyrics by Angeline van Otterdijk, and performed by the duo Re-union. The Dutch participating broadcaster, Nederlandse Omroep Stichting (NOS), organised the national final Nationaal Songfestival 2004 in order to select its entry for the contest. 24 entries competed in the national final which consisted of six shows: four semi-finals, a wildcard round and a final. Ten entries qualified from to compete in the final on 22 February 2004 where "Without You" performed by Re-union was selected as the winner following the combination of votes from a five-member jury panel and a public vote.

The Netherlands competed in the semi-final of the Eurovision Song Contest which took place on 12 May 2004. Performing as the closing entry during the show in position 22, "Without You" was announced among the top 10 entries of the semi-final and therefore qualified to compete in the final on 14 May. It was later revealed that the Netherlands placed sixth out of the 22 participating countries in the semi-final with 146 points. In the final, the Netherlands placed twentieth out of the 24 participating countries, scoring 11 points.

== Background ==
Prior to the 2004 contest, Nederlandse Televisie Stichting (NTS) until 1969, and Nederlandse Omroep Stichting (NOS) since 1970, had participated in the Eurovision Song Contest representing the Netherlands forty-four times since NTS début in the inaugural contest in 1956. They have won the contest four times: in 1957 with the song "Net als toen" performed by Corry Brokken; in 1959 with the song "'n Beetje" performed by Teddy Scholten; in 1969 as one of four countries to tie for first place with "De troubadour" performed by Lenny Kuhr; and finally in 1975 with "Ding-a-dong" performed by the group Teach-In. The Dutch least successful result has been last place, which they have achieved on four occasions, most recently in the 1968 contest. They has also received nul points on two occasions; in 1962 and 1963.

As part of its duties as participating broadcaster, NOS organises the selection of its entry in the Eurovision Song Contest and broadcasts the event in the country. The Dutch broadcasters has used various methods to select its entry in the past, such as the Nationaal Songfestival, a live televised national final to choose the performer, song or both to compete at Eurovision. However, internal selections have also been held on occasion. In 2003, NOS in collaboration with Televisie Radio Omroep Stichting (TROS), organised Nationaal Songfestival 2003 in order to select its entry for the contest, a method that was continued for the 2004 entry.

== Before Eurovision ==
=== Nationaal Songfestival 2004 ===
Nationaal Songfestival 2004 was the national final developed by NOS in collaboration with TROS to select its entry for the Eurovision Song Contest 2004. Twenty-four entries competed in the competition consisting of six shows that commenced with the first of four semi-finals on 22 January 2004, followed by a wildcard round on 19 February 2004 and concluded with a final on 22 February 2004. All shows in the competition took place at the Pepsi Stage in Amsterdam, hosted by Nance Coolen and Humberto Tan and were broadcast on Nederland 2 as well as streamed online via the broadcaster's Eurovision Song Contest website songfestival.nl.

==== Format ====
The format of the national final consisted of six shows: four semi-finals, a wildcard round and a final. The semi-finals each featured six competing entries from which two qualified directly to the final from each show. Six songs advanced to the wildcard round from which two entries advanced to complete the ten-song lineup in the final. Results during the semi-finals, the wildcard round shows and the selection of wildcards were determined by a five-member expert jury and votes from the public. In the semi-finals and the wildcard round, the jury selected one qualifier, while a public televote determined an additional qualifier from the remaining entries. A second round of public televoting took place following each semi-final where the winning song from each of the four shows advanced to the wildcard round. The jury then selected an additional two entries from the remaining non-qualifying acts to advance. The wildcard round qualifiers were revealed during broadcasts of the weekly backstage programme Op weg naar het songfestival. In the final, the winner was selected by the combination of votes from public televoting and a five-member expert jury. Viewers were able to vote via telephone, SMS and online.

The jury panel that voted in all shows consisted of:

- Cornald Maas – journalist
- Daniël Lohues – singer-songwriter, member of the group Skik
- Cor Bakker – musician
- Rob Stenders – radio DJ
- Ruth Jacott – singer and 1993 Dutch Eurovision entrant

==== Competing entries ====
A submission period was opened by the Dutch broadcaster on 17 July 2003 where artists and composers were able to submit their entries until 1 November 2003. 475 submissions were received by the broadcaster at the closing of the deadline, and the twenty-four selected competing entries were announced during a press conference that took place at the Pepsi Stage in Amsterdam on 7 January 2004.

Artist	Song	Songwriter(s)
Adriana Romeyn	"On a Wing and a Prayer"	Christian Grotenbreg, Bruce Smith
André Kuik	"Change"	Leonie Kuizenga, Jeremy Ebell
Anja Wessels	"Heart of Stone"	Kees Patijn
Arjen and Margriet	"De dag na de dertiende"	Arjen Tijs
Arno Kolenbrander	"The Story of My Life"	Johnny Logan
Babette Labeij	"Alright"	Adam Bar-Pereg, Babette Labeij, Dimitri Veltkamp
Bas and Joël feat. Voice Male	"Celeste"	Eric Dibek
Camp Girls	"In het licht in jouw ogen"	Frédérique Spigt, Jan van der Mey
Charly	"She'll Take Your Breath Away"	Alan Michael, Charly Luske
Cherwin	"Show Me the Love"	Ton Dijkman, Ferry van Leeuwen, Giovanni Caminita
Hot Black Stuff	"Bump!"	Richard Ascroft
Jaco van der Steen	"Here’s to the Summer"	Robbert van Ark, Sven Jansen
Jorge Castro	"Ritornero"	Edwin Schimscheimer, Arsenio Mangieri
Judith Jobse	"Love Me"	Judith Jobse
Kaysee	"Butterfly"	Kees Koedoder
Mai Tai	"Bring Back the Music"	Han Epskamp
Mandy	"Tell Me Why"	Mandy Gruijters, Tim Janssens
Mary Amora	"The Power of an Angel"	Romeo Samuel, Sietse Bakker
Re-union	"Without You"	Ed van Otterdijk, Angeline van Otterdijk
Suzy 'n' the Hi-Rollers	"Mississippi Miss"	Paul Meyer, Bruce Smith
Triple 10'rs	"One of a Kind"	Darre van Dijk, Lars Boom
Varna Springer	"Heimwee"	Varna Springer
William	"Love Me, Don't Leave Me"	Robin Albers, William Jansen, Boy Hagemann
Yellow Pearl	"For You and Me"	Emiel Pijnaker

==== Semi-finals ====
The four semi-finals took place on 22 January, 29 January, 5 February and 12 February 2004. In each semi-final six acts competed and two entries directly qualified to the final. A five-member expert jury first selected one entry to advance, while an additional qualifier was selected by a public televote. An additional six entries advanced to the wildcard round, one per semi-final by an additional round of public televoting that took place between the remaining four entries following each show and two selected by the jury from the twelve non-qualifiers.

Final (jury) qualifier Final (public vote) qualifier Wildcard round (public vote) qualifier Wildcard round (jury) qualifier

Semi-final 1 – 22 January 2004
R/O	Artist	Song	Jury		Televote		Result
R/O	Artist	Song	Votes	Rank	Percentage	Rank	Result
1	Charly	"She'll Take Your Breath Away"	31	3	10%	4	Wildcard
2	Arjen and Margriet	"De dag na de dertiende"	4	6	3%	6	—N/a
3	Re-union	"Without You"	54	1	49%	1	Final
4	Hot Black Stuff	"Bump!"	12	5	3%	5	—N/a
5	Arno Kolenbrander	"The Story of My Life"	16	4	14%	3	Wildcard
6	Babette Labeij	"Alright"	48	2	21%	2	Final

Detailed Jury Votes
R/O	Song	C. Maas	D. Lohues	C. Bakker	R. Stenders	R. Jacott	Total
1	"She'll Take Your Breath Away"	6	6	6	9	4	31
2	"De dag na de dertiende"				4		4
3	"Without You"	9	12	12	12	9	54
4	"Bump!"	2	4	2	2	2	12
5	"The Story of My Life"	4	2	4		6	16
6	"Alright"	12	9	9	6	12	48

Semi-final 2 – 29 January 2004
R/O	Artist	Song	Jury		Televote		Result
R/O	Artist	Song	Votes	Rank	Percentage	Rank	Result
1	William	"Love Me, Don't Leave Me"	10	5	5%	4	—N/a
2	Kaysee	"Butterfly"	0	6	4%	6	—N/a
3	Bas and Joël feat. Voice Male	"Celeste"	26	4	30%	2	Wildcard
4	Mandy	"Tell Me Why"	29	3	5%	4	Wildcard
5	Judith Jobse	"Love Me"	46	2	45%	1	Final
6	Yellow Pearl	"For You and Me"	54	1	11%	3	Final

Detailed Jury Votes
R/O	Song	C. Maas	D. Lohues	C. Bakker	R. Stenders	R. Jacott	Total
1	"Love Me, Don't Leave Me"	2	2	2	2	2	10
2	"Butterfly"						0
3	"Celeste"	4	9	6	6	4	26
4	"Tell Me Why"	6	4	4	9	6	29
5	"Love Me"	9	12	12	4	9	46
6	"For You and Me"	12	9	9	12	12	54

Semi-final 3 – 5 February 2004
R/O	Artist	Song	Jury		Televote		Result
R/O	Artist	Song	Votes	Rank	Percentage	Rank	Result
1	Jorge Castro	"Ritornero"	29	3	16%	2	—N/a
2	André Kuik	"Change"	23	5	16%	2	Wildcard
3	Mary Amora	"The Power of an Angel"	6	6	7%	6	—N/a
4	Varna Springer	"Heimwee"	28	4	11%	5	—N/a
5	Adriana Romeyn	"On a Wing and a Prayer"	54	1	15%	4	Final
6	Suzy 'n' the Hi-Rollers	"Mississippi Miss"	25	2	35%	1	Final

Detailed Jury Votes
R/O	Song	C. Maas	D. Lohues	C. Bakker	R. Stenders	R. Jacott	Total
1	"Ritornero"	6	4	4	6	9	29
2	"Change"	2	6	9	2	4	23
3	"The Power of an Angel"					6	6
4	"Heimwee"	4	12	6	4	2	28
5	"On a Wing and a Prayer"	9	9	12	12	12	54
6	"Mississippi Miss"	12	2	2	9		25

Semi-final 4 – 12 February 2004
R/O	Artist	Song	Jury		Televote		Result
R/O	Artist	Song	Votes	Rank	Percentage	Rank	Result
1	Mai Tai	"Bring Back the Music"	31	3	7%	6	—N/a
2	Triple 10'rs	"One of a Kind"	2	6	12%	5	—N/a
3	Jaco van der Steen	"Here's to the Summer"	16	5	15%	4	—N/a
4	Anja Wessels	"Heart of Stone"	49	1	21%	2	Final
5	Camp Girls	"In het licht in jouw ogen"	36	2	16%	3	Wildcard
6	Cherwin	"Show Me the Love"	31	3	29%	1	Final

Detailed Jury Votes
R/O	Song	C. Maas	D. Lohues	C. Bakker	R. Stenders	R. Jacott	Total
1	"Bring Back the Music"	6	4		12	9	31
2	"One of a Kind"			2			2
3	"Here's to the Summer"	2	6	4	2	2	16
4	"Heart of Stone"	12	12	12	9	4	49
5	"In het licht in jouw ogen"	9	9	6	6	6	36
6	"Show Me the Love"	4	2	9	4	12	31

==== Wildcard round ====
The wildcard round took place on 19 February 2004. Six acts competed and two entries qualified to the final. A five-member expert jury first selected one entry to advance, while an additional qualifier was selected by a public televote from the remaining five entries. Lenny Kuhr (who won Eurovision for the Netherlands in 1969) was also present during the show as a guest juror.

Jury qualifier Public vote qualifier

Wildcard round – 19 February 2004
R/O	Artist	Song	Jury		Televote		Result
R/O	Artist	Song	Votes	Rank	Percentage	Rank	Result
1	Mandy	"Tell Me Why"	48	2	9%	5	—N/a
2	Bas and Joël feat. Voice Male	"Celeste"	36	4	27%	2	Final
3	Camp Girls	"In het licht in jouw ogen"	43	3	13%	3	—N/a
4	Arno Kolenbrander	"The Story of My Life"	14	5	9%	5	—N/a
5	André Kuik	"Change"	6	6	10%	4	—N/a
6	Charly	"She'll Take Your Breath Away"	51	1	32%	1	Final

Detailed Jury Votes
R/O	Song	C. Maas	D. Lohues	C. Bakker	R. Stenders	R. Jacott	L. Kuhr	Total
1	"Tell Me Why"	9	12	2	12	9	4	48
2	"Celeste"	4	6	6	6	2	12	36
3	"In het licht in jouw ogen"	6	9	9	4	6	9	43
4	"The Story of My Life"	2	2	4		4	2	14
5	"Change"		4		2			6
6	"She'll Take Your Breath Away"	12		12	9	12	6	51

==== Final ====
The final took place on 22 February 2004 where the ten entries that qualified from the preceding four semi-finals and the wildcard round competed. The winner, "Without You" performed by Re-union, was selected by the 50/50 combination of a public televote and the votes of a five-member expert jury. The viewers and the juries each had a total of 255 points to award. Each juror distributed their points as follows: 1, 2, 3, 4, 5, 6, 8, 10 and 12 points. The viewer vote was based on the percentage of votes each song achieved through the following voting methods: telephone and SMS voting. For example, if a song gained 10% of the vote, then that entry would be awarded 10% of 255 points rounded to the nearest integer: 26 points. A record 200,000 votes were cast by the public during the final.

In addition to the performances of the competing entries, the show featured guest performances by the Extension Dancers, Arwin Kluft, Hind, Petra Berger, Sandra Kim (who won Eurovision for Belgium in 1986) and past Dutch Eurovision entrants Mandy Huydts (1986, as part of Frizzle Sizzle), Maxine (1996), Marjolein Spijkers (1997, as part of Mrs. Einstein), Marlayne (1999), Michelle (2001), and Esther Hart (2003).

Final – 22 February 2004
R/O	Singer	Song	Jury	Televote		Total	Place
R/O	Singer	Song	Jury	Percentage	Points	Total	Place
1	Cherwin	"Show Me the Love"	8	1.9%	5	13	10
2	Judith Jobse	"Love Me"	41	14.8%	38	79	3
3	Charly	"She'll Take Your Breath Away"	25	13.4%	34	59	4
4	Babette Labeij	"Alright"	14	1.5%	4	18	9
5	Yellow Pearl	"For You and Me"	23	3.1%	8	31	7
6	Bas and Joel feat. Voice Male	"Celeste"	11	18.2%	46	57	5
7	Adriana Romeijn	"On a Wing and a Prayer"	19	2.6%	7	26	8
8	Re-union	"Without You"	60	18.9%	48	108	1
9	Suzy and the Hi-Rollers	"Mississippi Miss"	25	4.8%	12	37	6
10	Anja Wessels	"Heart of Stone"	29	20.8%	53	82	2

Detailed Jury Votes
R/O	Song	C. Maas	D. Lohues	C. Bakker	R. Stenders	R. Jacott	Total
1	"Show Me the Love"		2	1		5	8
2	"Love Me"	10	10	6	5	10	41
3	"She'll Take Your Breath Away"	6		5	6	8	25
4	"Alright"	2	5	4	1	2	14
5	"For You and Me"	5	6	3	8	1	23
6	"Celeste"	1	4	2	4		11
7	"On a Wing and a Prayer"	3	3	8	2	3	19
8	"Without You"	12	12	12	12	12	60
9	"Mississippi Miss"	8	1		10	6	25
10	"Heart of Stone"	4	8	10	3	4	29

==== Ratings ====
Viewing figures by show
Show	Date	Viewing figures		Ref.
Show	Date	Nominal	Share	Ref.
Final	22 February 2004	1,904,000	30.1%	

== At Eurovision ==
It was announced that the competition's format would be expanded to include a semi-final in 2004. According to the rules, all nations with the exceptions of the host country, the "Big Four" (France, Germany, Spain and the United Kingdom), and the ten highest placed finishers in the 2003 contest are required to qualify from the semi-final on 12 May 2004 in order to compete for the final on 15 May 2004; the top ten countries from the semi-final progress to the final. On 23 March 2004, a special allocation draw was held which determined the running order for the semi-final and the Netherlands was set to perform last in position 22, following the entry from Bosnia and Herzegovina. At the end of the semi-final, the Netherlands was announced as having finished in the top 10 and consequently qualifying for the grand final. It was later revealed that the Netherlands placed sixth in the semi-final, receiving a total of 146 points. The draw for the running order for the final was done by the presenters during the announcement of the ten qualifying countries during the semi-final and the Netherlands was drawn to perform in position 7, following the entry from Malta and before the entry from Germany. The Netherlands placed twentieth in the final, scoring 11 points.

The semi-final and the final was broadcast in the Netherlands on Nederland 2 with commentary by Willem van Beusekom and Cornald Maas as well as via radio on Radio 3FM with commentary by Hijlco Span and Ron Stoeltie. NOS appointed Esther Hart (who represented the Netherlands in 2003) as its spokesperson to announce the Dutch votes during the final.

=== Voting ===
Below is a breakdown of points awarded to the Netherlands and awarded by the Netherlands in the semi-final and grand final of the contest. The nation awarded its 12 points to Serbia and Montenegro in the semi-final and to Turkey in the final of the contest.

Following the release of the televoting figures by the EBU after the conclusion of the competition, it was revealed that a total of 202,822 televotes were cast in the Netherlands during the two shows: 44,263 votes during the semi-final and 158,559 votes during the final.

==== Points awarded to the Netherlands ====
Points awarded to the Netherlands (Semi-final)
Score	Country
12 points	Belgium; Ireland
10 points	
8 points	Denmark; Estonia; Monaco
7 points	Andorra; Israel; Malta
6 points	Greece; Portugal
5 points	Belarus; Cyprus; Iceland; Lithuania; Spain
4 points	Croatia; Switzerland; Ukraine
3 points	Austria; Finland; Macedonia; Romania; United Kingdom
2 points	Bosnia and Herzegovina; Germany; Latvia; Norway; Slovenia; Turkey
1 point	Serbia and Montenegro

Points awarded to the Netherlands (Final)
Score	Country
12 points	
10 points	
8 points	
7 points	
6 points	Belgium
5 points	
4 points	
3 points	Estonia
2 points	Malta
1 point	

==== Points awarded by the Netherlands ====
Points awarded by the Netherlands (Semi-final)
Score	Country
12 points	Serbia and Montenegro
10 points	Cyprus
8 points	Bosnia and Herzegovina
7 points	Ukraine
6 points	Greece
5 points	Albania
4 points	Croatia
3 points	Malta
2 points	Israel
1 point	Macedonia

Points awarded by the Netherlands (Final)
Score	Country
12 points	Turkey
10 points	Serbia and Montenegro
8 points	Cyprus
7 points	Ukraine
6 points	Greece
5 points	Belgium
4 points	Spain
3 points	Germany
2 points	Bosnia and Herzegovina
1 point	Albania
