= Ukraine in the Eurovision Song Contest 2004 =

- Eurovision Song Contest 2004
- Participating broadcaster: National Television Company of Ukraine (NTU)
- Country: Ukraine
- Selection process: Internal selection
- Announcement date: Artist: 23 January 2004; Song: 25 March 2004

Competing entry
- Song: "Wild Dances"
- Artist: Ruslana
- Songwriters: Ruslana; Oleksandr Ksenofontov

Placement
- Semi-final result: Qualified (2nd, 256 points)
- Final result: 1st, 280 points

Participation chronology

Ukraine was represented at the Eurovision Song Contest 2004 with the song "Wild Dances", written by Ruslana Lyzhichko and Oleksandr Ksenofontov, and performed by Ruslana herself. The Ukrainian participating broadcaster, National Television Company of Ukraine (NTU), internally selected its entry for the contest. The broadcaster announced "Dyki tantsi" performed by Ruslana as its entry on 23 January 2004. The song was later retitled as "Wild Dances" and presented to the public on 25 March 2004.

Ukraine competed in the semi-final of the Eurovision Song Contest which took place on 12 May 2004. Performing during the show in position 11, "Wild Dances" was announced among the top 10 entries of the semi-final and therefore qualified to compete in the final on 14 May. It was later revealed that Ukraine placed second out of the 22 participating countries in the semi-final with 256 points. In the final, Ukraine performed in position 10 and placed first out of the 24 participating countries, winning the contest with 280 points. This was Ukraine's first win in the Eurovision Song Contest.

== Background ==
Prior to the 2004 contest, the National Television Company of Ukraine (NTU) had participated in the Eurovision Song Contest representing Ukraine only once, in 2003, where it placed 14th with the song "Hasta la vista" performed by Oleksandr Ponomaryov. NTU confirmed its intentions to participate at the 2004 contest on 15 October 2003. The broadcaster had used an internal selection in order to select its entry in 2003, a method which was continued to select its 2004 entry.

== Before Eurovision ==
=== Internal selection ===
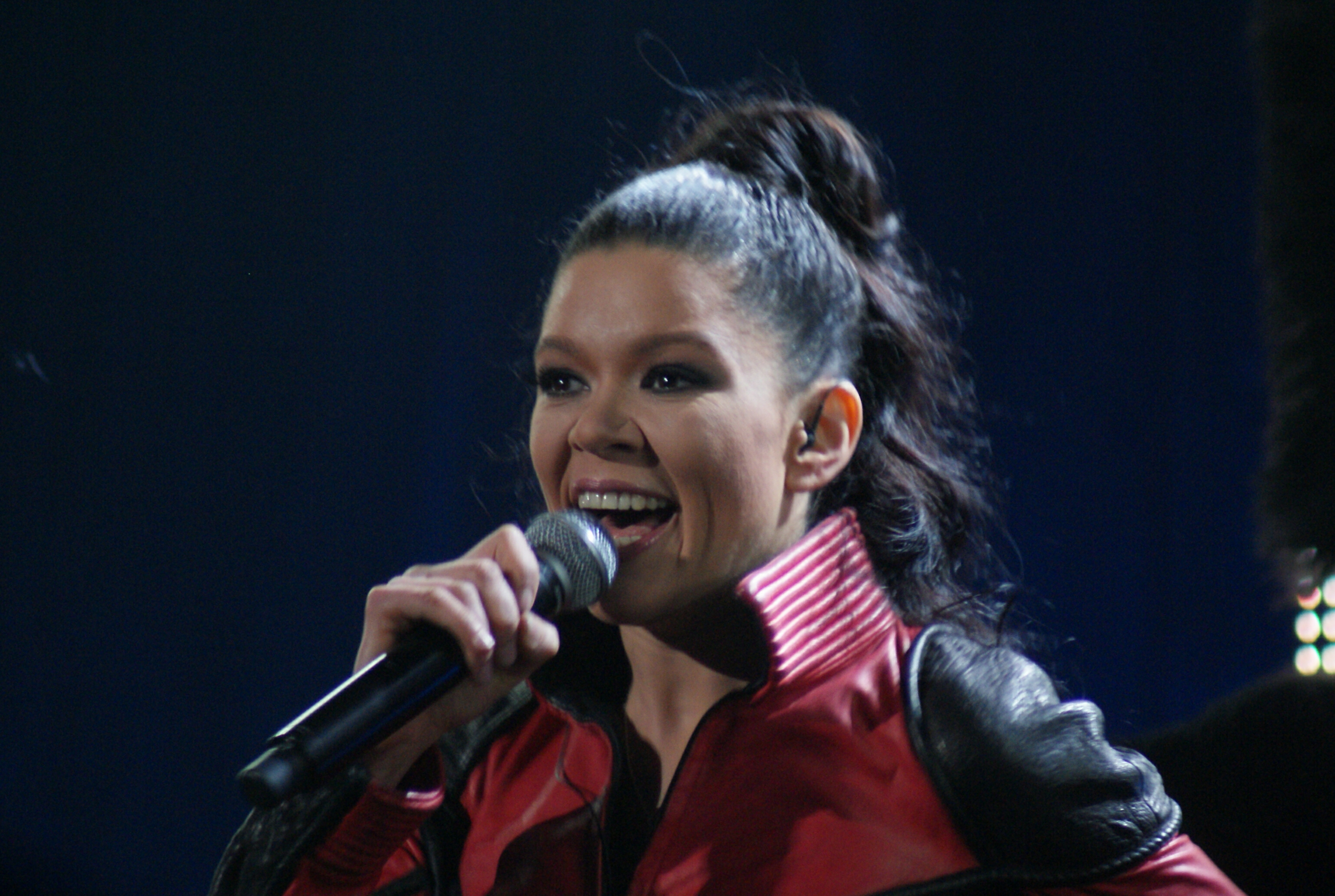
Ruslana was internally selected to represent Ukraine in the Eurovision Song Contest 2004

On 23 January 2004, NTU announced that they had internally selected Ruslana Lyzhychko to represent Ukraine in Istanbul. Ruslana's selection as the Ukrainian representative was decided upon from two artists considered by the Arts Council of NTU, the other being Ani Lorak. Anzhelika Rudnytska was also reported by Ukrainian media to have been considered, but was later denied by the broadcaster. On 28 January 2004, it was announced during a press conference that Ruslana would be performing the song "Wild Dances" at the Eurovision Song Contest, which was named after her latest album released in June 2003 under the Ukrainian title Dyki tantsi. The song, written by Ruslana together with Oleksandr Ksenofontov, featured a bilingual mix of Ukrainian and English lyrics. "Wild Dances" was presented to the public through the release of the official music video, directed by Evgeny Mitrofanov and filmed at the Ice Palace in Kyiv, on 25 March 2004.

=== Promotion ===
Ruslana made several appearances across Europe to specifically promote "Wild Dances" as the Ukrainian Eurovision entry. Promotional activities included concert appearances in more than fourteen countries, including performances at the Maltese Eurovision national final Malta Song for Europe 2004 on 14 February and the Latvian Eurovision national final Eirodziesma 2004 on 28 February.

== At Eurovision ==
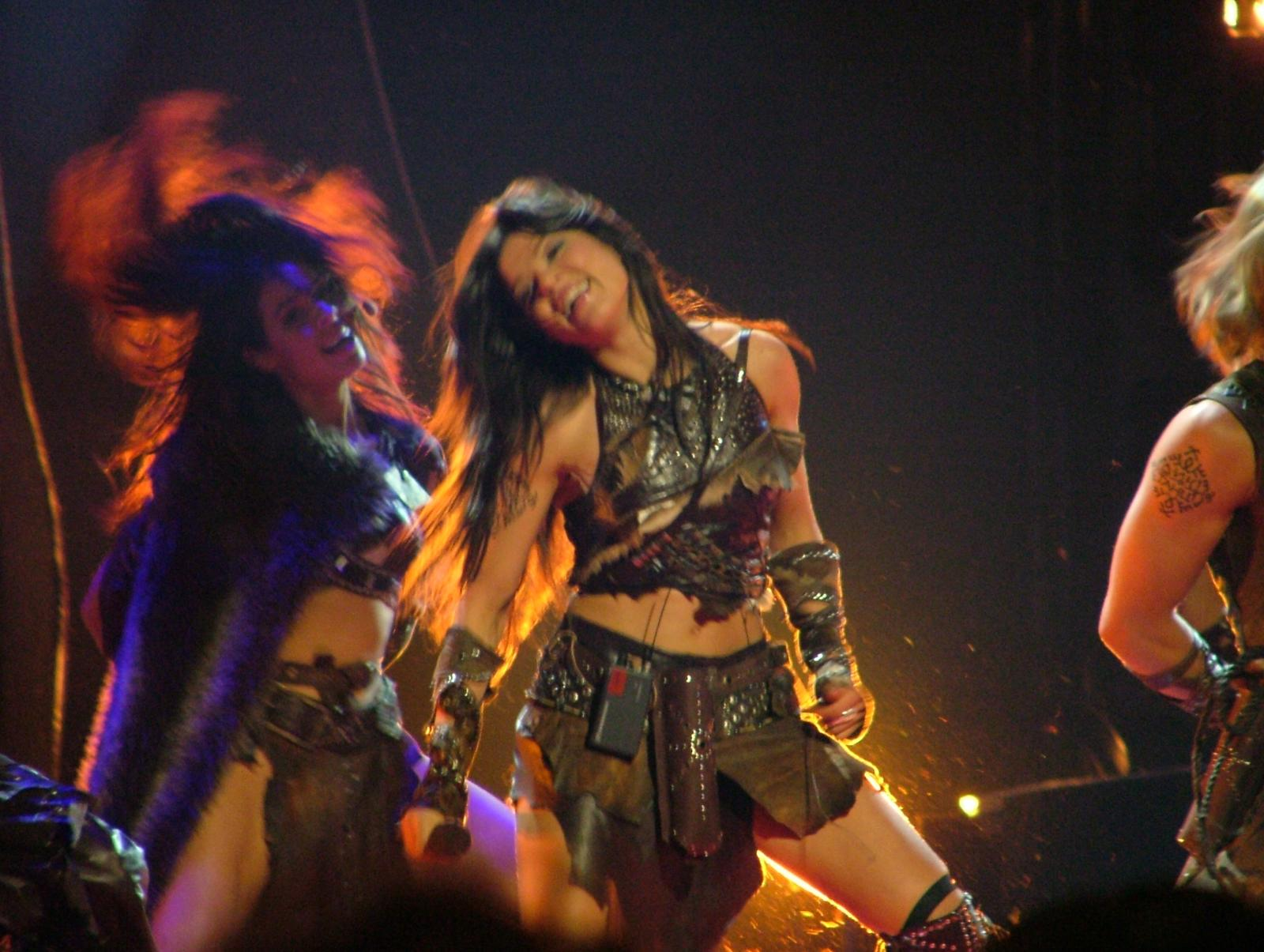
Ruslana during a rehearsal before the semi-final

It was announced that the competition's format would be expanded to include a semi-final in 2004. According to the rules, all nations with the exceptions of the host country, the "Big Four" (France, Germany, Spain and the United Kingdom), and the ten highest placed finishers in the 2003 contest are required to qualify from the semi-final on 12 May 2004 in order to compete for the final on 15 May 2004; the top ten countries from the semi-final progress to the final. On 23 March 2004, a special allocation draw was held which determined the running order for the semi-final and Ukraine was set to perform in position 11, following the entry from Greece and before the entry from Lithuania.

The Ukrainian performance featured Ruslana, dressed in a leather suit designed by Roksolana Bogutskaya, performing a choreographed routine with four dancers. At the end of the semi-final, Ukraine was announced as having finished in the top 10 and consequently qualifying for the grand final. It was later revealed that Ukraine placed second in the semi-final, receiving a total of 256 points. The draw for the running order for the final was done by the presenters during the announcement of the ten qualifying countries during the semi-final and Ukraine was drawn to perform in position 10, following the entry from Albania and before the entry from Croatia. Ukraine won the contest placing first with a score of 280 points. This was Ukraine's first victory in the Eurovision Song Contest since their first entry in 2003.

In Ukraine, both the semi-final and the final were broadcast on Pershyi Natsionalnyi with commentary by presenter and reporter of the music channel M1 Rodion Pryntsevskyi. Pryntsevskyi was due to provide reportages from Istanbul for the show Euroserie before NTU invited him to commentate their live broadcasts. NTU appointed Pavlo Shylko as its spokesperson to announce the Ukrainian votes during the final. As the last country to announce its votes when it had already become clear then that Ukraine would win the contest, Shylko screamed in Ukrainian at the beginning of his announcement: "Oh, how much we love you! We will go for vacation to Turkey as entire Ukraine! Do you understand?", to which presenter Korhan Abay thanked him in Turkish. Shylko would go on to co-host the Eurovision Song Contest 2005 together with Maria Efrosinina.

=== Marcel Bezençon Awards ===
The Marcel Bezençon Awards, first awarded during the 2002 contest, are awards honouring the best competing songs in the final each year. Named after the creator of the annual contest, Marcel Bezençon, the awards are divided into 3 categories: the Press Award, given to the best entry as voted on by the accredited media and press during the event; the Artistic Award, presented to the best artist as voted on by the shows' commentators; and the Composer Award, given to the best and most original composition as voted by the participating composers. Ruslana was awarded the Artistic Award, which was announced during an after show party on 16 May 2004.

=== Voting ===
Below is a breakdown of points awarded to Ukraine and awarded by Ukraine in the semi-final and grand final of the contest. The nation awarded its 12 points to Serbia and Montenegro in the semi-final and the final of the contest.

Following the release of the televoting figures by the EBU after the conclusion of the competition, it was revealed that a total of 8,138 televotes were cast in Ukraine during the two shows: 3,815 votes during the semi-final and 4,323 votes during the final.

==== Points awarded to Ukraine ====
Points awarded to Ukraine (Semi-final)
Score	Country
12 points	Belarus; Estonia; Lithuania; Portugal
10 points	Andorra; Iceland; Ireland; Israel; Latvia; Malta; Spain
8 points	Belgium; Croatia; Cyprus; Finland; Macedonia; Serbia and Montenegro; Slovenia; Turkey
7 points	Bosnia and Herzegovina; Greece; Netherlands; Norway; Romania; United Kingdom
6 points	Denmark; Germany; Sweden
5 points	Monaco
4 points	Austria
3 points	Albania
2 points	Switzerland
1 point	

Points awarded to Ukraine (Final)
Score	Country
12 points	Estonia; Iceland; Israel; Latvia; Lithuania; Poland; Russia; Turkey
10 points	Andorra; Belarus; Portugal; Serbia and Montenegro; Sweden
8 points	Croatia; Cyprus; Finland; Macedonia; Malta; Slovenia; Spain
7 points	Greece; Ireland; Netherlands; Norway
6 points	Bosnia and Herzegovina; Germany; Monaco; Romania
5 points	Albania; Belgium; Denmark; United Kingdom
4 points	Austria
3 points	
2 points	France
1 point	

==== Points awarded by Ukraine ====
Points awarded by Ukraine (Semi-final)
Score	Country
12 points	Serbia and Montenegro
10 points	Greece
8 points	Croatia
7 points	Cyprus
6 points	Macedonia
5 points	Belarus
4 points	Netherlands
3 points	Estonia
2 points	Malta
1 point	Albania

Points awarded by Ukraine (Final)
Score	Country
12 points	Serbia and Montenegro
10 points	Russia
8 points	Greece
7 points	Croatia
6 points	Turkey
5 points	Poland
4 points	Cyprus
3 points	Macedonia
2 points	Sweden
1 point	Malta
