= Ireland in the Eurovision Song Contest 2004 =

- Eurovision Song Contest 2004
- Participating broadcaster: Radio Telefís Éireann (RTÉ)
- Country: Ireland
- Selection process: You're a Star
- Selection date: 7 March 2004

Competing entry
- Song: "If My World Stopped Turning"
- Artist: Chris Doran
- Songwriters: Brian McFadden; Jonathan Shorten

Placement
- Final result: 22nd, 7 points

Participation chronology

Ireland was represented at the Eurovision Song Contest 2004 with the song "If My World Stopped Turning", written by Brian McFadden and Jonathan Shorten, and performed by Chris Doran. The Irish participating broadcaster, Radio Telefís Éireann (RTÉ), organised the competition You're a Star in order to select its entry for the contest. The competition consisted of 14 shows and concluded with a final, resulting in the selection of "If My World Stopped Turning" performed by Chris Doran as the Irish Eurovision entry after facing a public televote.

As one of ten highest placed finishers in the 2003 contest, Ireland directly qualified to compete in the final of the Eurovision Song Contest which took place on 15 May 2004. Performing in position 18, Ireland placed twenty-second out of the 24 participating countries with 7 points.

== Background ==
Prior to the 2004 contest, Radio Éireann (RÉ) until 1966, and Radio Telefís Éireann (RTÉ) since 1967, had participated in the Eurovision Song Contest representing Ireland thirty-seven times since RÉ's first entry in 1965. They have won the contest a record seven times in total. Their first win came in 1970, with "All Kinds of Everything" performed by Dana. Ireland holds the record for being the only country to win the contest three times in a row (in 1992, 1993, and 1994), as well as having the only three-time winner (Johnny Logan, who won in 1980 as a singer, 1987 as a singer-songwriter, and again in 1992 as a songwriter). In 2003, "We've Got the World" performed by Mickey Joe Harte placed eleventh.

As part of its duties as participating broadcaster, RTÉ organises the selection of its entry in the Eurovision Song Contest and broadcasts the event in the country. The broadcaster confirmed its intentions to participate at the 2004 contest on 29 July 2003. RTÉ has consistently used a national final procedure to choose its entry at the contest, with several artists and songs being featured. For the 2004 contest, the broadcaster announced alongside its confirmation that both the song and performer would be selected via the talent contest You're a Star.

== Before Eurovision ==
=== You're a Star ===
RTÉ selected its entry for the Eurovision Song Contest 2004 through the second season of the music competition series You're a Star, which was developed by RTÉ and co-produced with ShinAwil Productions. The shows took place in the Mahoney Hall of the Helix in the Dublin City University (DCU), hosted by Ray D'Arcy and featured a judging panel composed of composer and musician Phil Coulter, singer and former Eurovision winner Linda Martin and music manager Louis Walsh. The competition consisted of 14 shows, which commenced on 16 November 2003 and concluded on 6 March 2004. All shows in the competition were broadcast on RTÉ One.

The competition took place over two phases. The first phase involved over 5,000 candidates attending auditions held across Ireland in Letterkenny, Ennis, Longford, Waterford, and Dublin. The first five shows showcased the auditions and selected a total of 13 contestants to go forward to the next stage in the competition. Ten of the contestants were selected following a public televote (two per audition city) with the remaining three selected by the judging panel (one per judge). The second phase was the nine live shows where the results of all shows were determined solely by a public televote; the judging panel participated in an advisory role only. Following the sixth show, the four contestants remaining in the competition were matched with a potential Eurovision Song Contest song for them to perform in the eighth and ninth shows. The competing songs were selected by a jury panel with members appointed by RTÉ, which included RTÉ Head of Music Kevin Linehan and two of the competition judges Linda Martin and Louis Walsh, from over 300 entries received through a public submission. The public televote that took place in both phases was conducted through telephone and SMS.

Competing songs
| Song | Songwriter(s) |
|---|---|
| "If My World Stopped Turning" | Brian McFadden, Jonathan Shorten |
| "Losing You" | Sinéad McNally |
| "Summer Rain" | Brendan McCarthy, Niall Mooney |
| "The Moon Going Home" | John Spillane |

==== Results summary ====
Colour key
– Contestant received the most public votes
– Contestant received the fewest public votes and was eliminated

| Contestant | Show 1 | Show 2 | Show 3 | Show 4 | Show 5 | Show 6 | Show 7 | Show 8 | Show 9 (Final) |
|---|---|---|---|---|---|---|---|---|---|
| Chris Doran | —N/a | 2nd | 2nd | 2nd | 2nd | 1st | 1st | 1st | 1st |
| James Kilbane | 2nd | —N/a | 5th | 4th | 4th | 4th | 2nd | 2nd | 2nd |
| Jean Elliot | —N/a | 4th | 9th | 5th | 5th | 3rd | 3rd | 3rd | Eliminated (Show 8) |
| George Murphy | —N/a | 1st | 1st | 1st | 1st | 2nd | 4th | Eliminated (Show 7) | |
| Final Four | 1st | —N/a | 4th | 6th | 3rd | 5th | Eliminated (Show 6) | | |
| Gary O'Malley | —N/a | 3rd | 3rd | 3rd | 6th/7th | Eliminated (Show 5) | | | |
| Laura Brophy | 4th | —N/a | 8th | 7th | 6th/7th | Eliminated (Show 5) | | | |
| Phil Coulter and Gill Blacque | —N/a | 6th | 6th | 8th/9th | Eliminated (Show 4) | | | | |
| Ruth Cullen | 3rd | —N/a | 7th | 8th/9th | Eliminated (Show 4) | | | | |
| Cladach | 5th | —N/a | 10th | Eliminated (Show 3) | | | | | |
| Philip Noone | —N/a | 5th | 11th | Eliminated (Show 3) | | | | | |
| Colin Fahy | —N/a | 7th | Eliminated (Show 2) | | | | | | |
| Gary Philbin | 6th | Eliminated (Show 1) | | | | | | | |

==== Live shows ====
The nine live shows took place between 11 January and 6 March 2004. The first seven shows featured various themes: free choice for the first two shows, Irish songs for the third show, American songs for the fourth show, The Beatles' hits for the fifth show, love songs for the sixth show, and country songs and Eurovision songs for the seventh show. Either one or two contestants were eliminated in each of the seven shows. The three remaining contestants each performed their candidate Eurovision songs during the eighth show and one contestant was eliminated. One of the candidate songs "The Moon Going Home" was not performed after its assigned performer, George Murphy, was eliminated during the seventh show. "If My World Stopped Turning" performed by Chris Doran was selected as the winner following the final show and announced the day after on 7 March 2004. Over 900,000 televotes were cast during the final show.

Guest judges also featured in several shows: producer Bill Hughes for the first show, journalist Nell McCafferty for the second show, RTÉ 2fm presenter Dave Fanning for the fifth show, disc jockey Ryan Tubridy for the sixth show, former member of Boyzone Keith Duffy for the seventh show and You're a Star first season winner Mickey Harte for the eighth show.

Show 1 – 11 January 2004
| R/O | Artist | Song (Original artists) | Place | Result |
|---|---|---|---|---|
| 1 | Cladach | "Feels Like Home" (Chantal Kreviazuk) | 5 | Advanced |
| 2 | Gary Philbin | "Drops of Jupiter" (Train) | 6 | —N/a |
| 3 | Laura Brophy | "Take Me Home, Country Roads" (John Denver) | 4 | Advanced |
| 4 | James Kilbane | "Love, Me" (Collin Raye) | 2 | Advanced |
| 5 | Ruth Cullen | "Tears in Heaven" (Eric Clapton) | 3 | Advanced |
| 6 | Final Four | "Crazy Love" (Van Morrison) | 1 | Advanced |

Show 2 – 18 January 2004
| R/O | Artist | Song (Original artists) | Place | Result |
|---|---|---|---|---|
| 1 | Philip Noone | "Sweet Home Alabama" (Lynyrd Skynyrd) | 5 | Advanced |
| 2 | Colin Fahy | "Big Yellow Taxi" (Joni Mitchell) | 7 | —N/a |
| 3 | Jean Elliott | "How Do I Live" (LeAnn Rimes) | 4 | Advanced |
| 4 | Chris Doran | "She Believes in Me" (Kenny Rogers) | 2 | Advanced |
| 5 | Phil Coulter and Gill Blacque | "Faith" (George Michael) | 6 | Advanced |
| 6 | Gary O'Malley | "Brown Eyed Girl" (Van Morrison) | 3 | Advanced |
| 7 | George Murphy | "The Times They Are a-Changin'" (Bob Dylan) | 1 | Advanced |

Show 3 – 25 January 2004
| R/O | Artist | Song (Original artists) | Place | Result |
|---|---|---|---|---|
| 1 | Cladach | "Mary from Dungloe" | 10 | —N/a |
| 2 | Laura Brophy | "Past the Point of Rescue" (Hal Ketchum) | 8 | Advanced |
| 3 | James Kilbane | "Stuck in a Moment You Can't Get Out Of" (U2) | 5 | Advanced |
| 4 | Ruth Cullen | "You Raise Me Up" | 7 | Advanced |
| 5 | Final Four | "The Long Goodbye" | 4 | Advanced |
| 6 | Philip Noone | "Mary" | 11 | —N/a |
| 7 | Jean Elliott | "She Moved Through the Fair" | 9 | Advanced |
| 8 | Chris Doran | "When You Were Sweet Sixteen" (The Fureys) | 2 | Advanced |
| 9 | Phil Coulter and Gill Blacque | "Will Ye Go, Lassie, Go?" | 6 | Advanced |
| 10 | Gary O'Malley | "Brown Eyed Girl" (Van Morrison) | 3 | Advanced |
| 11 | George Murphy | "The Rare Old Times" (Dublin City Ramblers) | 1 | Advanced |

Show 4 – 1 February 2004
| R/O | Artist | Song (Original artists) | Place | Result |
|---|---|---|---|---|
| 1 | Laura Brophy | "Angel" (Sarah McLachlan) | 7 | Advanced |
| 2 | James Kilbane | "King of the Road" (Roger Miller) | 4 | Advanced |
| 3 | Ruth Cullen | "You've Got a Friend" (James Taylor) | 8-9 | —N/a |
| 4 | Final Four | "Everything I Do" (Bryan Adams) | 6 | Advanced |
| 5 | Jean Elliott | "Heaven Is a Place on Earth" (Belinda Carlisle) | 5 | Advanced |
| 6 | Chris Doran | "I Can't Stop Lovin' You" (Ray Charles) | 2 | Advanced |
| 7 | Phil Coulter and Gill Blacque | "Will You Still Love Me Tomorrow" (Carole King) | 8-9 | —N/a |
| 8 | Gary O'Malley | "Take It Easy" (The Eagles) | 3 | Advanced |
| 9 | George Murphy | "Goodnight, Irene" (Woody Guthrie) | 1 | Advanced |

Show 5 – 8 February 2004
| R/O | Artist | Song (Original artists) | Place | Result |
|---|---|---|---|---|
| 1 | Laura Brophy | "Imagine" (The Beatles) | 6-7 | —N/a |
| 2 | James Kilbane | "All My Loving" (The Beatles) | 4 | Advanced |
| 3 | Final Four | "Yesterday" (The Beatles) | 3 | Advanced |
| 4 | Jean Elliott | "Come Together" (The Beatles) | 5 | Advanced |
| 5 | Chris Doran | "The Long and Winding Road" (The Beatles) | 2 | Advanced |
| 6 | Gary O'Malley | "A Hard Day's Night" (The Beatles) | 6-7 | —N/a |
| 7 | George Murphy | "Working Class Hero" (John Lennon) | 1 | Advanced |

Show 6 – 15 February 2004
| R/O | Artist | Song (Original artists) | Place | Result |
|---|---|---|---|---|
| 1 | James Kilbane | "Love Letters" (Ketty Lester) | 4 | Advanced |
| 2 | Final Four | "Blue Moon" (Frankie Lymon and the Teenagers) | 5 | —N/a |
| 3 | Jean Elliott | "Someone to Watch Over Me" (Ella Fitzgerald) | 3 | Advanced |
| 4 | Chris Doran | "Release Me" (Engelbert Humperdinck) | 1 | Advanced |
| 5 | George Murphy | "Strangers in the Night" (Frank Sinatra) | 2 | Advanced |

Show 7 – 22 February 2004
| R/O | Artist | Song (Original artists) | R/O | Song (Original artists) | Place | Result |
|---|---|---|---|---|---|---|
| 1 | James Kilbane | "That Summer" (Garth Brooks) | 5 | "Save Your Kisses for Me" (Brotherhood of Man) | 2 | Advanced |
| 2 | Jean Elliott | "Baby Now That I've Found You" (The Foundations) | 6 | "Waterloo" (ABBA) | 3 | Advanced |
| 3 | Chris Doran | "The Dance" (Garth Brooks) | 7 | "Hold Me Now" (Johnny Logan) | 1 | Advanced |
| 4 | George Murphy | "Song Sung Blue" (Neil Diamond) | 8 | "Congratulations" (Cliff Richard) | 4 | —N/a |

Show 8 – 29 February 2004
| R/O | Artist | Song | Place | Result |
|---|---|---|---|---|
| 1 | James Kilbane | "Losing You" | 2 | Advanced |
| 2 | Jean Elliot | "Summer Rain" | 3 | —N/a |
| 3 | Chris Doran | "If My World Stopped Turning" | 1 | Advanced |

Final – 6 March 2004
| R/O | Artist | Song | Place |
|---|---|---|---|
| 1 | James Kilbane | "Losing You" | 2 |
| 2 | Chris Doran | "If My World Stopped Turning" | 1 |

== At Eurovision ==
It was announced that the competition's format would be expanded to include a semi-final in 2004. According to the rules, all nations with the exceptions of the host country, the "Big Four" (France, Germany, Spain and the United Kingdom) and the ten highest placed finishers in the 2003 contest are required to qualify from the semi-final in order to compete for the final; the top ten countries from the semi-final progress to the final. As Ireland finished joint 11th in the 2003 contest, the nation automatically qualified to compete in the final on 15 May 2004. On 23 March 2004, an allocation draw was held which determined the running order and Ireland was set to perform in position 18 in the final, following the entry from Iceland and before the entry from Poland. Ireland placed twenty-second in the final, scoring 7 points.

In Ireland, the semi-final was broadcast on RTÉ Network 2 and the final was broadcast on RTÉ One with both shows featuring commentary by Marty Whelan. RTÉ appointed Johnny Logan a its spokesperson to announce the Irish votes during the final.

=== Voting ===
Below is a breakdown of points awarded to Ireland and awarded by Ireland in the semi-final and grand final of the contest. The nation awarded its 12 points to the Netherlands in the semi-final and to Sweden in the final of the contest.

Following the release of the televoting figures by the EBU after the conclusion of the competition, it was revealed that a total of 50,408 televotes were cast in Ireland during the two shows: 13,410 votes during the semi-final and 36,998 votes during the final.

==== Points awarded to Ireland ====
Points awarded to Ireland (Final)
| Score | Country |
|---|---|
| 12 points | |
| 10 points | |
| 8 points | |
| 7 points | United Kingdom |
| 6 points | |
| 5 points | |
| 4 points | |
| 3 points | |
| 2 points | |
| 1 point | |

==== Points awarded by Ireland ====
Points awarded by Ireland (Semi-final)
| Score | Country |
|---|---|
| 12 points | Netherlands |
| 10 points | Ukraine |
| 8 points | Cyprus |
| 7 points | Bosnia and Herzegovina |
| 6 points | Serbia and Montenegro |
| 5 points | Albania |
| 4 points | Latvia |
| 3 points | Lithuania |
| 2 points | Greece |
| 1 point | Malta |

Points awarded by Ireland (Final)
| Score | Country |
|---|---|
| 12 points | Sweden |
| 10 points | Cyprus |
| 8 points | United Kingdom |
| 7 points | Ukraine |
| 6 points | Malta |
| 5 points | Greece |
| 4 points | Germany |
| 3 points | Serbia and Montenegro |
| 2 points | Albania |
| 1 point | Turkey |
