= Fomins and Kleins =

Latvian musical group

- Also known as: Les jumeaux Tadros
- Origin: Liepāja, Latvia
- Genres: Pop, Rock
- Years active: 2002-2006
- Members: Ivo Fomins; Tomass Kleins

Fomins & Kleins was a Latvian rock group formed in 2002.

Its members Ivo Fomins and Tomass Kleins were already accomplished and recognized rock musicians. Both are from the western Latvian port city of Liepāja.

== Previous collaborations ==
Both have worked together previously, in Soviet times forming the underground group "Saldās sejas" (Sweet Faces), which also featured well known Latvian musicians Zigfrīds Muktupāvels and Guntars Račs — with whom a creative relationship continues to this day, since Račs himself is the author of the lyrics to all of Fomins & Kleins' songs.

== Ivo Fomins ==
Singer Ivo Fomins, also educated as a chef, has taken part in many musical projects in Latvia, performing together with the band "Liepājas Brāļi" (Brothers of Liepāja) and as a solo artist. At the Jurmala Young Pop Singer Competition Ivo reached 3rd place in 1989 and received the viewer's choice award. Ivo's older brother Igo is a popular Latvian singer and is well known throughout the Baltic countries and Russia due to his work with the maestro Raimonds Pauls, which led to the formation and massive popularity of the band Remix.

== Tomass Kleins ==
Tomass Kleins is the group's guitarist, as well as the author of all the group's music. In his time, he has formed many groups and has played in the famous group Neptūns (Neptune), led by Zodiaks (Zodiac) producer and composer Jānis Lūsēns.

== Eurovision ==
The group's debut album "Muzikants" (Musician) was released in 2003, and the album's title track became a huge hit after the duo successfully performed at the Latvian National Eurovision Competition and finished in second place.

In 2004, they again found themselves singing the only Latvian-language song in the country's Eurovision pre-selection. This time they won, and the song "Dziesma par laimi" was selected as Latvia's entry for the Eurovision Song Contest 2004 in Istanbul. Due to the poor result of the previous year's Latvian entry, Fomins and Kleins had to take part in the novelty of a Eurovision semi-final, in which they failed to achieve the top-ten placing needed to advance to the grand final, finishing 17th in a field of 22.

== Membership ==
Together with Ivo Fomins and Tomass Kleins, the group is rounded out by bass guitarist Egils Mežs, drummer Valery Inutin and keyboardist Jānis Lūsēns Jr., and drummers Nellija Bubujance and Tālis Gžibovskis.

== Discography ==
=== Albums ===
- Muzikants (Musician) – 2003
- Dzimis Latvijā (Born in Latvia) – 2004

=== Radio singles ===
- "Sniegs" (Snow) – 2002
- "Solījums" (Promise) – 2003
- "Muzikants" (Musician) – 2003
- "Kur esi tu" (Where are You) – 2003
- "Tālu prom" (Far Away) – 2003
- "Man vairs nav vienalga" (Now I Care) – 2004
- "Aizejošās dienas" (Departing Days) – 2004
- "Nekas" (Nothing) – 2004
- "Dziesma par laimi" (Song of Happiness) – 2004

== Videos ==
- "Solījums" (Promise) – 2003
- "Tālu prom" (Far Away) – 2003
- "Dziesma par laimi" (Song of Happiness) – 2004

Awards and achievements
Preceded by F.L.Y. with "Hello from Mars"	Latvia in the Eurovision Song Contest; 2004	Succeeded by Walters & Kazha with "The War Is Not Over"
