= Ludwig Galea =

Maltese singer

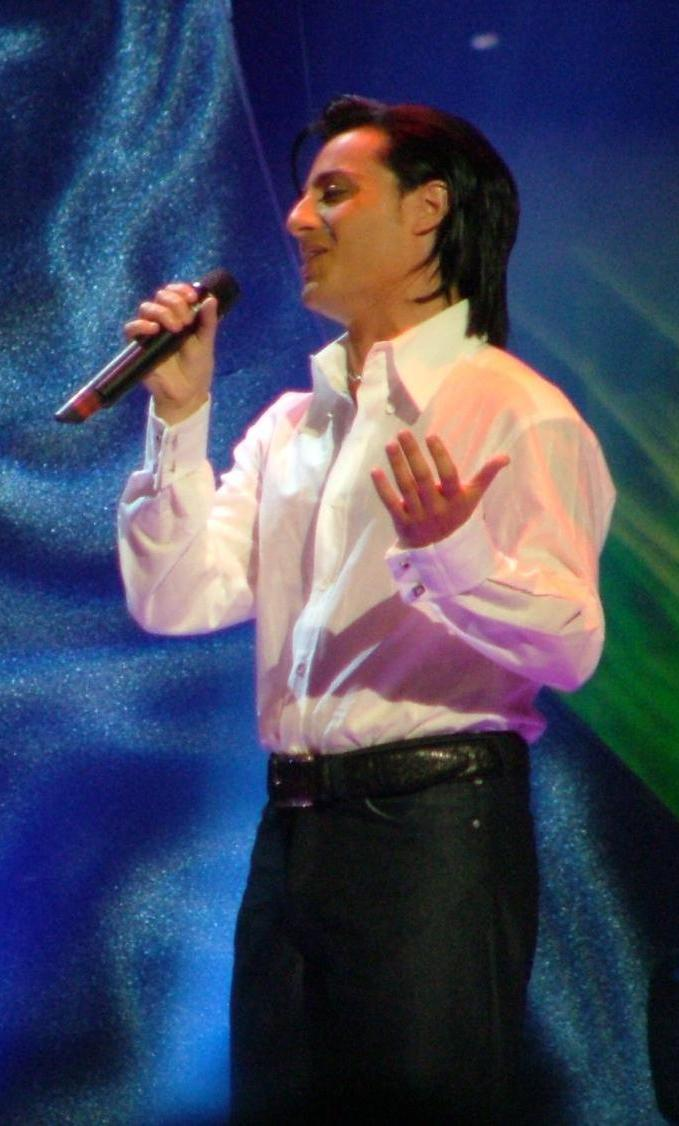
Ludwig Galea during a rehearsal at the Eurovision Song Contest 2004 in Istanbul

Ludwig Galea is a Maltese singer who performed in the Eurovision Song Contest in Istanbul, Turkey, in May 2004. As one half of the duo "Julie and Ludwig", he and his partner, Julie Zahra, qualified to the final and came 12th out of 36 countries competing. Their song, "On Again... Off Again," recorded in Germany, was just in the top 12, so Malta were automatically qualified for the 2005 contest in Kyiv, Ukraine in May 2005.

Ludwig was born on 26 November 1977. His first appearance was in 2000 at the 'Festival ghaz-zghazagh 2000' (engl.: 'Festival for youths') wherein he placed third with a song which he composed entitled 'All you ever need'.

Together with Julie, Ludwig entered various local and international song festivals with the songs "Adagio", "Endlessly", "My Number One", "Sebat Ilwien" and of course, the Maltese Eurovision entry for 2004, "On Again...Off Again". They also participated in the Golden Stage (Romania) with the cover-version of the Romanian Eurovision 2002 entry "Tell Me Why".
