= Julie Zahra =

Maltese politician and singer (born 1982)

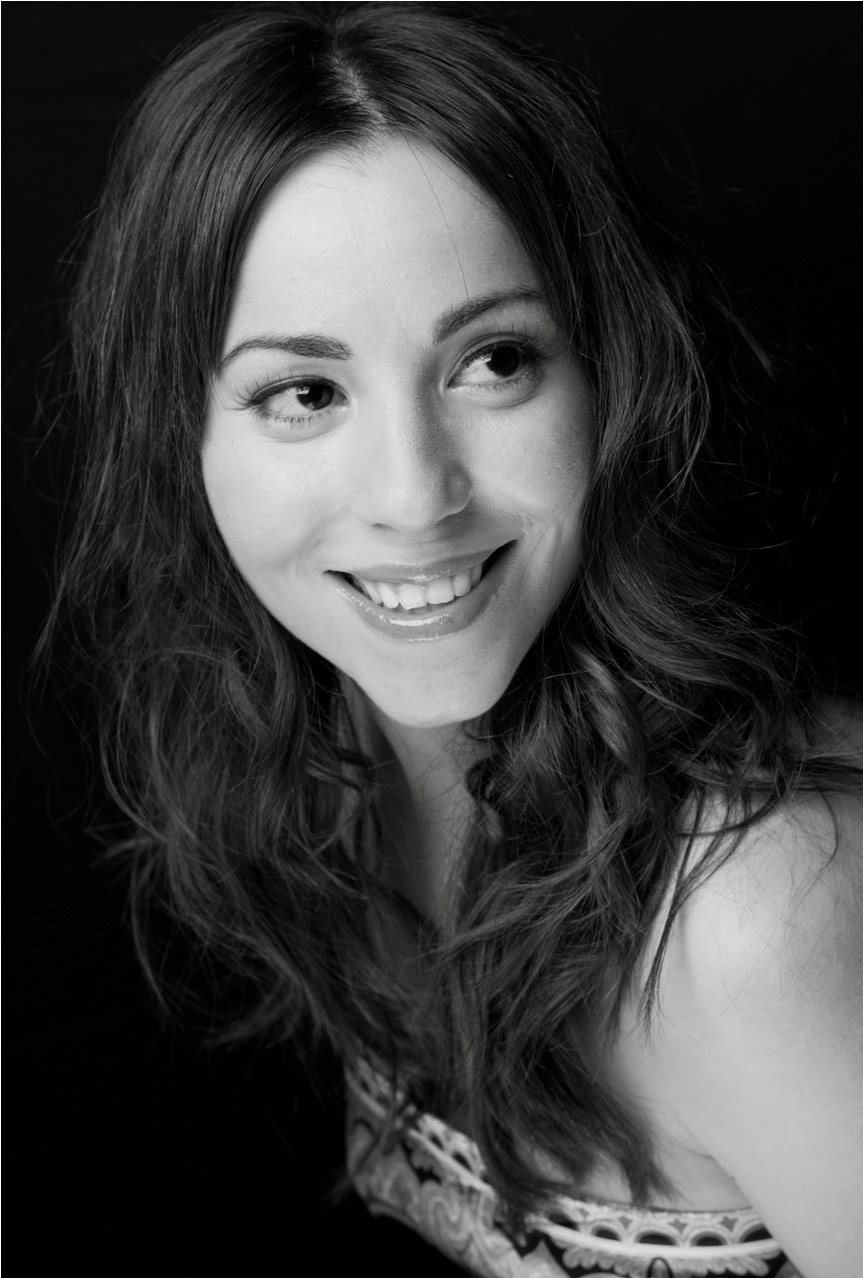
- Julie Zahra in 2013
- Born: 1982 (age 42–43); Malta

Julie Ann Zahra (born 1982, Malta) is a Maltese politician and singer who represented Malta in the Eurovision Song Contest in Istanbul, Turkey, in May 2004. As part of the duo "Julie & Ludwig", their song On Again... Off Again qualified for the final and came 12th out of 36 countries competing. Zahra was also the spokesperson for Malta at the 2015 Contest.

== Musical career ==
Zahra is a classically trained singer who was involved in music from a young age. She took part in many local and international festivals, TV drama, music videos, and theatre. She moved to the United Kingdom to expand her singing career and to continue studying classical voice. She completed her Music degree with Trinity Guildhall, London.

In the United Kingdom. Zahra taught at the Performance Academy of Newcastle College, and taught Music and Singing at All Saints College in Newcastle upon Tyne for over a year. She also taught singing with Stagecoach theatre schools, did workshops in schools around Buckinghamshire and North London.

Zahra launched a single entitled "No one in Heaven" in 2012. She continues to release recordings.

Zahra has since moved back to Malta, where she has been teaching Music in various schools and performing arts schools. She has performed in several venues around the island and with the Malta Philharmonic Orchestra.

== Personal life ==
By 2017, Zahra has become a mother to a girl named Nina Mae.

== Political career ==
In 2021, it was confirmed that Zahra was a candidate for the Nationalist Party. She is now an MP and she was elected by the gender mechanisms quota on the 8th District in the 2022 Maltese general election.
