= Russia in the Eurovision Song Contest 2005 =

- Eurovision Song Contest 2005
- Country: Russia
- Selection process: Evrovidenie 2005 - Vybirayet Rossiya
- Selection date: 25 February 2005

Competing entry
- Song: "Nobody Hurt No One"
- Artist: Natalia Podolskaya
- Songwriters: Viktor Drobysh; Jussi-Pekka Järvinen; Mary Susan Applegate

Placement
- Final result: 15th, 57 points

Participation chronology

Russia was represented at the Eurovision Song Contest 2005 with the song "Nobody Hurt No One", written by Viktor Drobysh, Jussi-Pekka Järvinen, and Mary Susan Applegate, and performed by Natalia Podolskaya. The Russian entry was selected through a national final, organised by the Russian broadcaster Channel One Russia (C1R). At the contest, Russia placed 15th and scored 57 points.

== Before Eurovision ==
=== Evrovidenie 2005 - Vybirayet Rossiya ===
Evrovidenie 2005 - Vybirayet Rossiya (retroactively often referred to as Nacionalny Otbor na Evrovidenie 2005) was the third edition of Evrovidenie, the music competition that selects Russia's entry for the Eurovision Song Contest. The competition consisted of three semi-finals and a final held on 4, 11, 18 and 25 February 2005, respectively. All shows took place at the Studio 1 in Ostankino Technical Center in Moscow, hosted by Andrey Malakhov and Yana Churikova and broadcast on Channel One as well as online via the broadcaster's website 1tv.ru.

==== Format ====
The format of the national final consisted of four shows: three semi-finals with ten acts each on 4, 11 and 18 February 2005, and a final on 21 February 2005. The top three entries of each semi-final as determined by a public televote proceeded to the final, during which the winner was selected exclusively through the public televote. In order to cater to the three time zones in Russia, all four shows were broadcast live three times and therefore the competing artists had to perform their song three times. All regions participated in the voting via telephone and SMS, with the results being announced during the final broadcast for Western Russia.

==== Competing entries ====
On 11 January 2005, C1R announced a submission period for interested artists and composers to submit their entries until 1 February 2005. 57 entries were shortlisted from the received submissions and a jury panel selected the 30 semi-finalists for the national final on 1 February 2005. The jury consisted of Konstantin Ernst (general manager of C1R), Yuriy Aksyuta (music director of C1R), Igor Matvienko (composer and producer), Maxim Fadeev (composer and producer), Viktor Drobysh (composer and producer), Alexey Charykov (composer and producer), Ilya Bachurin (vice president of MTV Russia), Artur Gasparyan (music editor for Moskovskij Komsomolets), Vladimir Polupanov (music editor for Argumenty i Fakty), Maxim Kononenko (editor-in-chief of Dni.ru), Larisa Havkina (journalist for Komsomolskaya Pravda), Vladimir Matetsky (singer-songwriter and producer), Maksim Dunayevsky (composer), Larisa Dolina (singer), Alexander Malinin (singer) and Larisa Sinelshikova (media manager and producer).

Artists Selection – 1 February 2005
Artist	Song
A-Sortie	"Keep On Shining"
Aleksandr Panayotov and Alexey Chumakov	"Balalayka" (Балалайка)
Anastasia Maksimova	"Prosypaisya" (Просыпайся)
Anastasia Stotskaya	"Shadows Dance All Around Me"
Anita Tsoy	"La-la-ley" (Ла-ла-лей)
Anton Dalli	"Uletish" (Улетишь)
Anzhelika Rudnitskaya	"Serdtse angela" (Сердце ангела)
Ariana	"Pozovi menya" (Позови меня)
Batyrkhan Shukenov	"Tvoi shagi" (Твои шаги)
Be Good	"Take Me Back to Rio"
Chay Vdvoyom	"Lusille Is My Name"
City	"Gorod lyubvi" (Город любви)
Dima Bilan	"Not That Simple"
Evgenii Gor	"Ledi" (Леди)
Fateeva and X-Missia	"Ya rozhden lyubit tebya" (Я рожден любить тебя)
Ganopoulos Stefanos	"Falling in Love"
Grenada	"Pochemu ty molchal" (Почему ты молчал)
Irina Schott	"Identify Yourself"
Jam and Yelena Terleyeva	"No More War"
Julietta M.	"Chot ty so mnoyu sdelal" (Что со мной ты сделал)
Katerina Ozerova	"Prosto otpusti" (Просто отпусти)
Katya Bachurina	"Teryala tebya" (Теряла тебя)
KGB	"Stop"
Lada Dance	"Mixed Up World"
Lana Light	"Never Never"
Lyubovnie istorii	"Kak zhe tak" (Как же так)
Marina Sudas	"Prosto tak" (Просто так)
Min Net	"Peace-Da" (Peace-Да)
Miss Rossiya	"Solnechniy luch" (Солнечный луч)
Natalia Podolskaya	"Nobody Hurt No One"
Natalia Vlasova	"Vremenami" (Временами)
Nichya	"Gospody" (Господи)
Nikolay Demidov	"Differences"
Nikolay Krupatin	"Ne zamanivay" (Не заманивай)
Olga Mikheeva	"Plamya i lyuod" (Пламя и лед)
OKI	"Nevidimka" (Невидимка)
Oksana Mazhulis	"Rebel Angel"
Pankov A.V.	"Provodnik" (Проводник)
Pari	"Mozhet byt" (Может быть)
Pereprava	"Luchina" (Лучина)
Playgirls	"Don't Get Down Like That"
Polina Griffith	"Justice of Love"
Reflex	"Lyublyu" (Люблю)
Roman Nikitin	"Navorochenniy" (Навороченный)
Roman Polonskiy	"The Story of My Life"
Roman Smirnov	"One Day"
Sankt-Peterburg	"Matreshki" (Матрешки)
Serg N	"Long Living Death of the Dream"
Sergey Mazaev	"Slavyanskie tantsy" (Славянские танцы)
Sergei Nezhin	"Daleko" (Далеко)
Slava	"I Wanna Be the One"
Varvara	"Letala da pela" (Летела да пела)
Verka Serduchka	"Gop Gap"
Victoria Markova	"Ya zakroyu dver" (Я закрою дверь)
VIP	"Iz za tebya" (Из-за тебя)
Volya	"Volya, veter" (Воля, ветер)
Yana Kay	"Beautiful Things"
Zveri	"Snegopad" (Снегопад)

Artist	Song	Songwriter(s)
A-Sortie	"Keep On Shining"	Vyacheslav Bodolika, Karen Kavaleryan, Irina Antonyan
Aleksandr Panayotov and Alexey Chumakov	"Balalayka" (Балалайка)	Karen Kavaleryan, Kim Breitburg
Anastasia Stotskaya	"Shadows Dance All Around Me"	Dimitris Kontopoulos, Dimitris S.
Anita Tsoy	"La-la-ley" (Ла-ла-лей)	Anita Tsoy, Eleonora Melnik
Anzhelika Rudnitskaya	"Serdtse angela" (Сердце ангела)	Artur Kulpovich, Aleks Bezdolya
Batyrkhan Shukenov	"Tvoi shagi" (Твои шаги)	Vladimir Kovalyov, Yerkesh Shakeyev
Be Good	"Take Me Back to Rio"	Vladimir Gustov, Igor Balakirev
Chay Vdvoyom	"Lusille Is My Name"	Igor Balakirev, Denis Klyaver
City	"Gorod lyubvi" (Город любви)	Roman Bokaryov, Mikhail Mshenskiy
Dima Bilan	"Not That Simple"	Steve Robson, Michelle Escoffery
Irina Schott	"Identify Yourself"	Peter Wright, Ben Robbins
Jam and Yelena Terleyeva	"No More War"	Jam
Katya Bachurina	"Teryala tebya" (Теряла тебя)	Dmitriy Moss, Artur A'Kim
KGB	"Stop"	Viktor Drobysh, Mary Susan Applegate
Lada Dance	"Mixed Up World"	Marc Paelinck
Lana Light	"Never Never"	Alex Grozin, Skinner, Caporaso
Natalia Podolskaya	"Nobody Hurt No One"	Mary Susan Applegate, Jussi-Pekka Järvinen, Viktor Drobysh
Nikolay Demidov	"Differences"	Nikolay Demidov
Oksana Mazhulis	"Rebel Angel"	Pouluzzi, Nacket
Playgirls	"Don't Get Down Like That"	Carl Sturken, Evan Rogers
Polina Griffith	"Justice of Love"	Polina Griffith
Reflex	"Lyublyu" (Люблю)	Vyacheslav Tyurin, Yevgeniy Abramov, Irina Nelson
Roman Polonskiy	"The Story of My Life"	Murlyn Music Group
Roman Smirnov	"One Day"	D. Buzagi, Roman Smirnov
Sankt-Peterburg	"Matreshki" (Матрешки)	Vladimir Trushin
Sergey Mazaev	"Slavyanskie tantsy" (Славянские танцы)	Sergey Mazaev
Slava	"I Wanna Be the One"	Tracy Lipp, Viktor Drobysh, Maki Kolehmainen
Varvara	"Letala da pela" (Летела да пела)	Vladimir Molchanov, Artur A'Kim
~~Verka Serduchka~~	~~"Gop Gap"~~	N/A
Victoria Markova	"Ya zakroyu dver" (Я закрою дверь)	Victoria Markova, Artur Grigoryan
Zveri	"Snegopad" (Снегопад)	Roma Zver, Viktor Bondarev

==== Semi-final 1 ====
The first semi-final took place on 4 February 2005. Ten entries competed and a public televote exclusively selected the top three entries to proceed to the final. The three qualifiers were "No More War" performed by Jam and Yelena Terleyeva, "Shadows Dance All Around Me" performed by Anastasia Stotskaya and "Not That Simple" performed by Dima Bilan. In addition to the performances of the competing entries, 2000 Russian Eurovision entrant Alsou, 2004 Russian Eurovision entrant Julia Savicheva and singer Alexander Malinin performed as guests.

Semi-final 1 – 4 February 2005
R/O	Artist	Song	Televote	Place
1	KGB	"Stop"	9.1%	6
2	Roman Polonskiy	"The Story of My Life"	4.8%	9
3	Batyrkhan Shukenov	"Tvoi shagi"	6.9%	7
4	Playgirls	"Don't Get Down Like That"	9.6%	5
5	Dima Bilan	"Not That Simple"	13.4%	3
6	Katya Bachurina	"Teryala tebya"	5.7%	8
7	Jam and Yelena Terleyeva	"No More War"	20.1%	1
8	Reflex	"Lyublyu"	11.0%	4
9	Roman Smirnov	"One Day"	3.9%	10
10	Anastasia Stotskaya	"Shadows Dance All Around Me"	15.5%	2

==== Semi-final 2 ====
The second semi-final took place on 11 February 2005. Ten entries competed and a public televote exclusively selected the top three entries to proceed to the final. The three qualifiers were "Nobody Hurt No One" performed by Natalia Podolskaya, "Letala da pela" performed by Varvara and "Lusille is My Name" performed by Chay Vdvoyom. In addition to the performances of the competing entries, singers Anzhelika Varum, Larisa Dolina and Leonid Agutin performed as guests.

Semi-final 2 – 11 February 2005
R/O	Artist	Song	Televote	Place
1	Zveri	"Snegopad"	13.2%	4
2	Oksana Mazhulis	"Rebel Angel"	5.0%	6
3	City	"Gorod lyubvi"	0.7%	10
4	A-Sortie	"Keep On Shining"	12.0%	5
5	Lana Light	"Never Never"	2.0%	8
6	Varvara	"Letala da pela"	20.4%	2
7	Chay Vdvoyom	"Lusille Is My Name"	14.4%	3
8	Anzhelika Rudnitskaya	"Serdtse angela"	1.8%	9
9	Be Good	"Take Me Back to Rio"	3.3%	7
10	Natalia Podolskaya	"Nobody Hurt No One"	27.2%	1
11	~~Verka Serduchka~~	~~"Gop Gap"~~	—	—

==== Semi-final 3 ====
The third semi-final took place on 18 February 2005. Ten entries were to compete, however Sergey Mazaev was disqualified from the competition after being late for the Siberia run of the live show and nine entries ultimately competed. A public televote exclusively selected the top three entries to proceed to the final. The three qualifiers were "Identify Yourself" performed by Irina Schott, "Balalayka" performed by Aleksandr Panayotov and Alexey Chumakov and "I Wanna Be the One" performed by Slava. In addition to the performances of the competing entries, 2001 Russian Eurovision entrants Mumiy Troll and 2002 Russian Eurovision entrants Prime Minister performed as guests.

Semi-final 3 – 18 February 2005
R/O	Artist	Song	Televote	Place
1	Polina Griffith	"Justice of Love"	6.4%	6
2	Aleksandr Panayotov and Alexey Chumakov	"Balalayka"	22.5%	2
3	Victoria Markova	"Ya zakroyu dver"	0.8%	9
4	Anita Tsoy	"La-la-ley"	6.3%	7
5	Nikolay Demidov	"Differences"	8.7%	4
6	Lada Dance	"Mixed Up World"	8.1%	5
7	Sankt-Peterburg	"Matreshki"	1.8%	8
8	Slava	"I Wanna Be the One"	9.7%	3
9	Irina Schott	"Identify Yourself"	35.7%	1
10	~~Sergey Mazaev~~	~~"Slavyanskie tantsy"~~	—	—

==== Final ====
The final took place on 25 February 2005 where the nine entries that qualified from the preceding three semi-finals competed. The winner, "Nobody Hurt No One" performed by Natalia Podolskaya, was determined exclusively by public televoting. A jury panel also provided commentary and feedback to the artists during the show and selected "Not That Simple" performed by Dima Bilan as having the best performance. In addition to the performances of the competing entries, 1995 Russian Eurovision entrant Philipp Kirkorov and singers Afric Simone, Bonnie Tyler, Valeriya performed as guests.

Final – 25 February 2005
R/O	Artist	Song	Televote	Place
1	Aleksandr Panayotov and Alexey Chumakov	"Balalayka"	10%	6
2	Jam and Yelena Terleyeva	"No More War"	7.2%	7
3	Irina Schott	"Identify Yourself"	12.4%	4
4	Chay Vdvoyom	"Lusille Is My Name"	5.1%	8
5	Varvara	"Letala da pela"	12.3%	5
6	Slava	"I Wanna Be the One"	4.3%	9
7	Dima Bilan	"Not That Simple"	14.6%	2
8	Anastasia Stotskaya	"Shadows Dance All Around Me"	13.6%	3
9	Natalia Podolskaya	"Nobody Hurt No One"	20.5%	1

== At Eurovision ==
Since Russia placed within the top 10 countries (excluding the Big Four) in the 2004 Contest, Russia pre-qualified to compete directly in the final of the Eurovision Song Contest 2005. On 22 March 2005, Russia was drawn to perform 20th in the final on 21 May 2005, following Greece and preceding Bosnia and Herzegovina.

For the Russian performance, Podolskaya was joined on stage by bassist Toni Hintikka, guitarist Valeriy Drobysh, drummer Teijo Jamsa, and backing vocalists Yana Kozlova and Olga Belaya. After the voting concluded, Russia scored 57 points and placed 15th. Since Russia was not among the top 10 countries (excluding the results of the Big Four), Russia did not qualify to compete directly in the final of the 2006 Contest and would have to compete in the semi-final.

The semi-final and final were broadcast on Channel One, with commentary by Yuriy Aksyuta and Elena Batinova. The voting spokesperson for Russia was Yana Churikova.

=== Voting ===
==== Points awarded to Russia ====
Points awarded to Russia (Final)
Score	Country
12 points	Belarus
10 points	Latvia; Moldova
8 points	
7 points	Estonia; Finland; Lithuania
6 points	
5 points	
4 points	Ukraine
3 points	
2 points	
1 point	

==== Points awarded by Russia ====
Points awarded by Russia (Semi-final)
Score	Country
12 points	Moldova
10 points	Belarus
8 points	Israel
7 points	Hungary
6 points	Slovenia
5 points	Poland
4 points	Denmark
3 points	Romania
2 points	Switzerland
1 point	Latvia

Points awarded by Russia (Final)
Score	Country
12 points	Malta
10 points	Moldova
8 points	Israel
7 points	Switzerland
6 points	Serbia and Montenegro
5 points	Latvia
4 points	Greece
3 points	Hungary
2 points	Ukraine
1 point	Croatia
