= Yelena Terleyeva =

Russian singer (born 1985)

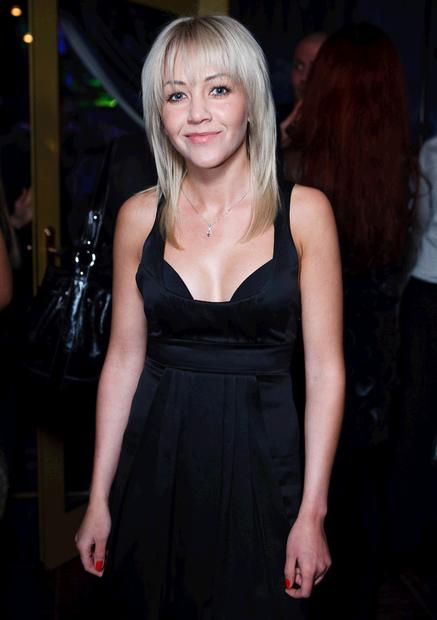
- Terleyeva in 2009
- Born: Yelena Vladimirovna Terleyeva; March 6, 1985 (age 41); Surgut, RSFSR, Soviet Union
- Occupations: Singer, songwriter
- Years active: 2003-present
- Musical career
- Origin: Novy Urengoy
- Genres: Pop, Jazz, dance music
- Labels: Monolit Records; Gamma Music

Yelena Vladimirovna Terleyeva (Russian: Еле́на Владимировна Терле́ева, alternatively transliterated as Elena Terleeva) (born March 6, 1985, in Surgut, USSR) is a Russian singer, best known for her chart-topping single "Solntse" (Russian: Солнце).

== Early life ==
Terleyeva was born in the subarctic city of Surgut to a family of a music teacher and an army officer. Shortly after her birth, the family moved to Novy Urengoy in the Yamalo-Nenets Autonomous Okrug. She studied piano and vocals in a local music school while growing up. At the age of 15, she participated in the Russian televised music competition Morning Star, where she won her poule. After finishing secondary school, she moved to Moscow to study pop and jazz vocals at the Institute of Modern Arts, from which she graduated in 2005. Before rising to prominence, she sang regularly in clubs. Later, she achieved a Master of Fine Arts from the Moscow State University.

== Career ==
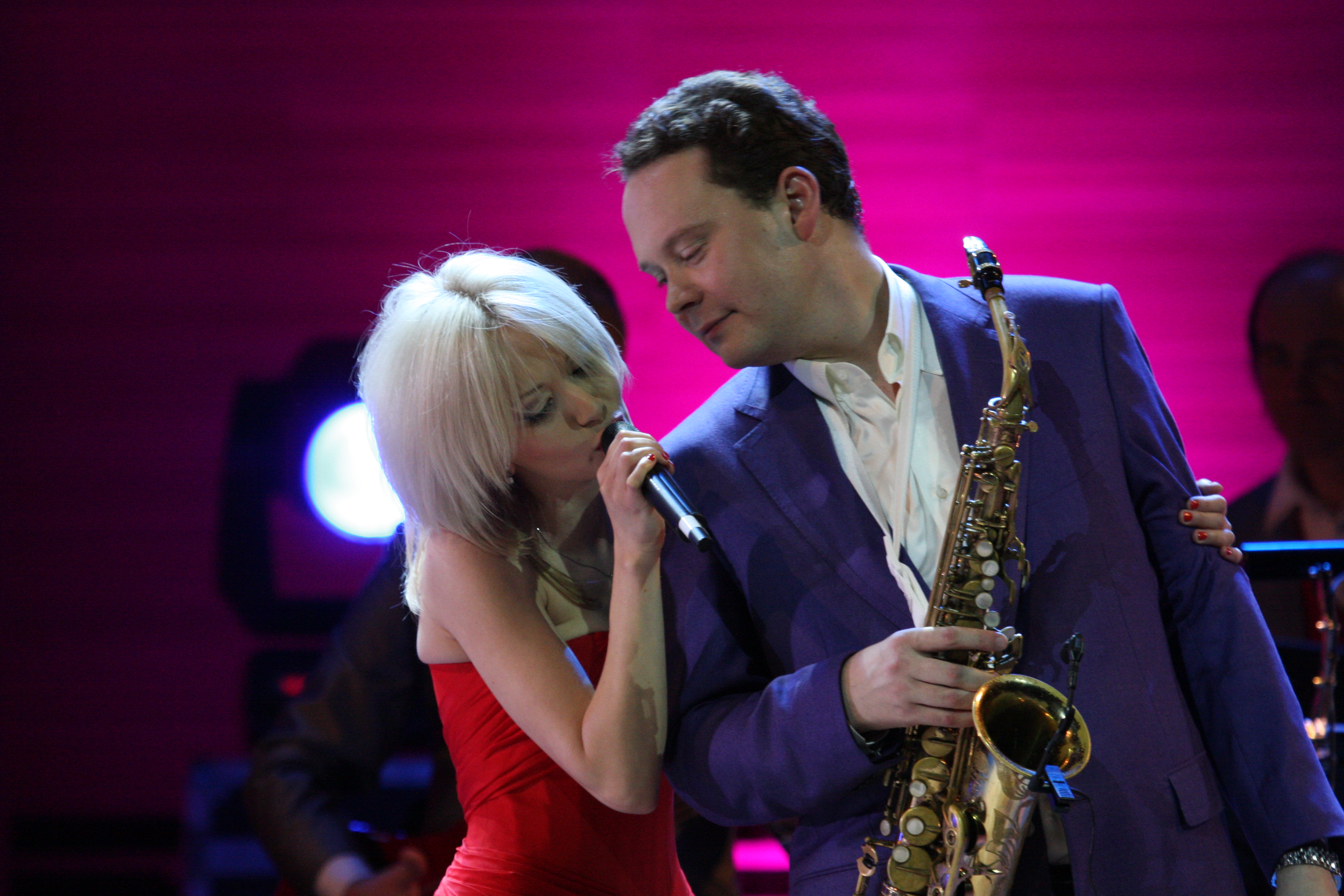
Terleyeva (left) performing in 2010.

Terleyeva rose to prominence in Russia following her participation in the second season of Fabrika Zvyozd on Channel One Russia. Terleyeva remained among the favourites for the victory during the season, but eventually placed second behind Polina Gagarina. However, since, the show's creative producer Maxim Fadeev has claimed that Terleyeva should have been the rightful winner of the show as she received the most televotes during the final, unlike what was shown to the audiences. After Fabrika Zvyozd, Terleyeva signed with Fadeev's label Monolit Records.

Initially focused on receiving her education, in 2005, Terleyeva returned to the public eye and competed alongside Jam in the Russian preselection of the Eurovision Song Contest 2005. With their duet "No More War", they won the first semi-final, ahead of Dima Bilan and Anastasiya Stotskaya on 4 February 2005. Eventually, in the final of 25 February, the duo finished sixth. Their song "No More War" however charted in the Russian TopHit radio airplay charts, peaking at #81. That same year, Terleyeva released her first self-penned single "Mezhdu mnoyu i toboyu" (between me and you), which became her breakthrough song. The single went to peak the airplay charts at #29. Her subsequent single "Bros'" also entered the TopHit charts.

In 2006, she guest-starred in Fabrika Zvyozd, singing "Mezhdu mnoyu i toboyu" in duet with Prokhor Chaliapin. Later that same year, she released her next single "Solntse" (Sun), which topped the TopHit airplay charts in April 2007 and stayed on top for eight weeks straight. For "Solntse", Terleyeva received her first and only Golden Gramophone Award. At the end of the year, she performed the song at Pesnya goda, where it was highlighted as one of the largest radio hits of the year. During the Russian Music Awards in 2007, Terleyeva received nominations for Best Female Singer and Best Composition for "Solntse". In December 2007, she released "Lyubi menya" (Love Me), which also managed to top the TopHit charts. Terleyeva wrote and performed the song "Ty i ya" (You and I) for the soundtrack of the 2008 Russian motion picture Black Hunters.

Following her departure from Monolit, Terleyeva changed her musical direction, focusing more on jazz music. As a result, she collaborated with jazz musician Alexander Novikov during this period, frequently performing with him at concerts. Her commercial output started to decrease for several years. In 2013, Terleyeva released two albums, PredIstoriya filled with jazz compositions and Solntse, which contained a mix with her biggest hits. The latter album was still released through Monolit Records.

Between 2013 and 2019, she released a string of single that had different chart outcomes. In 2015, she released her single "Ne proshu" (I Don't Ask), followed by the single "Ukhodi" (Leave) in 2018. A year later, she released her self-penned song "Vdokh-vydokh" (Inhale-exhale).

== Discography ==
=== Studio albums ===
Title	Details
Solntse	Released: 2013; Label: Monolit Records; Format: Digital download
PredIstoriya	Released: 2013; Label: Self-released/Gamma Music; Format: Digital download

=== Singles ===
Title	Year	Peak chart positions	Album
Title	Year	RUS Airplay	Album
"No More War" (With Jam)	2005	81	Non-album single
"Mezdhu mnoyu i toboyu"	2005	29	Solntse
"Bros'"	2006	24	Solntse
"Solntse"	2006	1	Solntse
"Lyubi menya"	2007	1	Non-album single
"Nyet menya (ne Lena)"	2010	176	PredIstoriya
"Tsvety"	2010	215	PredIstoriya
"Obmanu sebya"	2013	173	PredIstoriya
"Nemaya lyubov'"	2013	196	PredIstoriya
"Vdokh-vydokh"	2019	—	Non-album single

== Music videos ==
Year	Song	Director
2006	"Bros'"	Maksim Rozhkov
2007	"Solntse"	Yevgeny Kuritsyn
2008	"Lyubi menya"	Alan Badoev
2012	"Prosto"	Nikolay Gavrilyk
