= Slava (singer) =

Russian singer, actress, and model (born 1980)

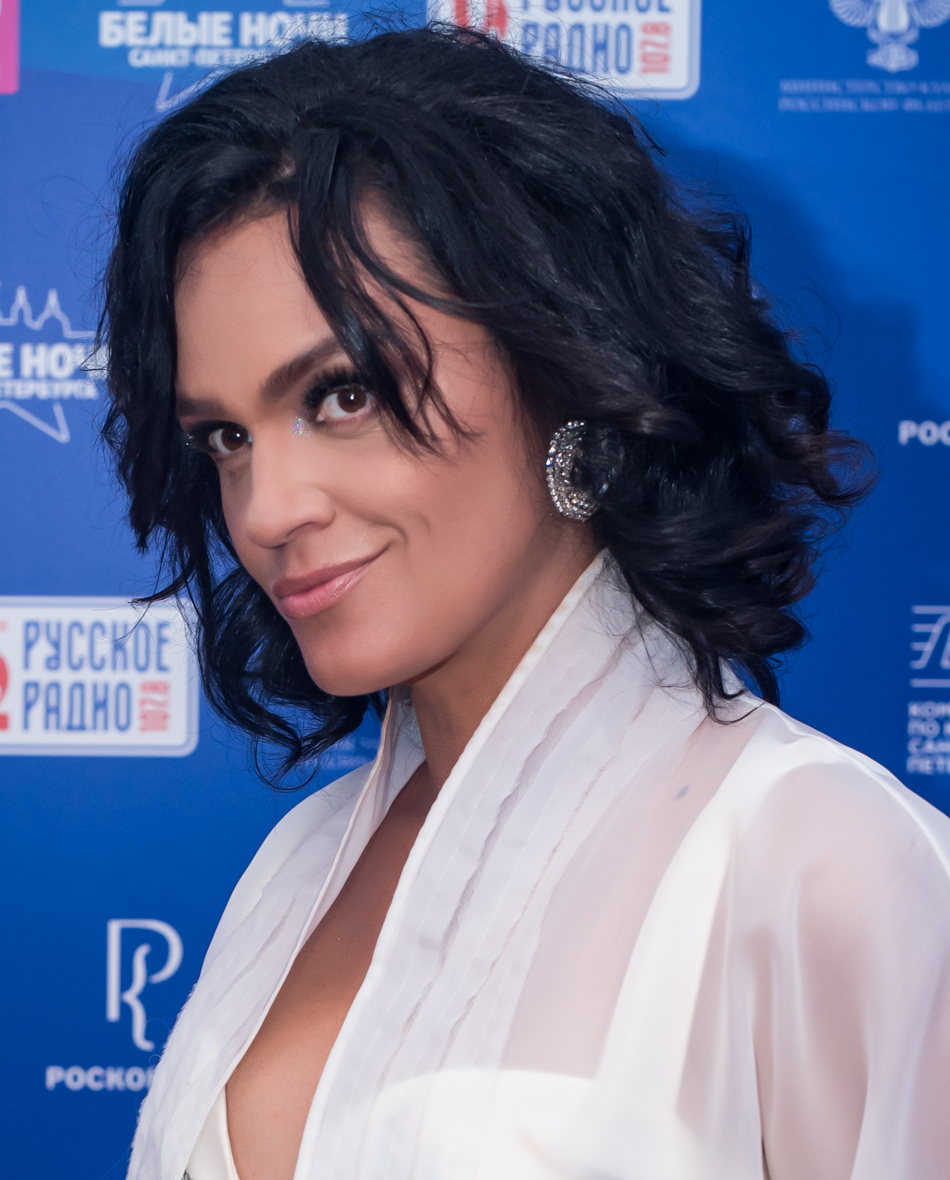
- Slava at the White Nights Festival 2023
- Born: Anastasia Vladimirovna Slanevskaya; 15 May 1980 (age 46); Moscow, Russian SFSR, Soviet Union
- Occupations: Singer; actress; model
- Years active: 2001–present
- Height: 1.77 m (5 ft 9 1/2 in)
- Partner: Anatoly Danilitsky (2002–2024)
- Children: 2

Anastasia Vladimirovna Slanevskaya (Russian: Анастаси́я Влади́мировна Слане́вская; born 15 May 1980), known professionally as Slava (Russian: Сла́ва), is a Russian singer and actress. Known for songs such as "Popuchitsa", "Odinochestvo", and "Pervaya lyubov - lyubov poslednyaya", she has won several Golden Gramophone Awards and has also appeared in various films and theatrical productions in Russia.

== Early life ==
Anastasia Vladimirovna Slanevskaya was born on 15 May 1980 in Moscow to a driver father, Vladimir, and an economist mother, Ekaterina. Her parents separated when she was two years old, following which she and her older sister Elena were raised primarily by their mother. Her grandmother sang in the Pyatnitsky Choir. Slanevskaya's interest in music began when she was a child and she frequently sang karaoke. She has claimed Romani ancestry and performed traditional songs. She often played sports, particularly volleyball, and was captain of the school team. She struggled in school due to dyslexia, but was only diagnosed while in university, where she studied psychology. She left without graduating and later worked a number of jobs, including as a model.

== Career ==
=== 2001–2007: Popuchitsa and Klassniy ===
Prior to her musical career, Slanevskaya had a small acting role in the television series The Mole in 2001. In the spring of 2002, she was discovered by television producer Sergei Kalvarsky while performing at a karaoke club. Kalvarsky, who is known for his work with Russian singers Alla Pugacheva and Philip Kirkorov, waited until Slanevskaya finished singing and then offered her a collaboration with him and Oleg Chelishev. Slanevsakaya's first release under the name Slava was the single "Lyublyu ili nenavizhu" ("Love or Hate") in 2004. It received a music video directed by Kalvarsky and earned Slanevskaya several nominations at the 2004 MTV Russia Music Awards. It was followed by her debut album Popuchitsa ("Fellow Traveller") in the autumn of the same year. Two further singles were released from the album, "Ogon'-voda" ("Fire-Water") and the title track. The latter song and its video, directed by Mikhail Khleborodov, are credited with bringing her a wider audience.

Slanevskaya participated in the Russian national selection for the Eurovision Song Contest 2005 with the song "I Wanna Be the One". She advanced to the final, but finished last. The song was included on her second studio album Klassniy ("Cool"), which was released in 2006. Other singles from the album were the title track, "Ukrala ulybku" ("Stole a Smile"), and "Doroga belaya" ("White Road"). She later played the role of Lisa in Khleborodov's film Paragraph 78, which was released in two parts in 2007, and performed its title song "V nebo" ("Into the Sky"). It was one of the new tracks on her compilation album The Best, released the same year.

=== 2008–2015: Odinochestvo and Otkrovenno ===
By 2008, Slanevskaya had recorded an English-language album in London under the working title Eclipse, intended to be her international debut. It explored a more R&B style than the pop music she had previously released in Russia, and a collaborative song with English musician Craig David, "Never Too Late", was released in November 2008. However, it failed to achieve airplay and Eclipse was ultimately shelved. In 2010, she released "Odinochestvo" ("Loneliness"), which became one of her most successful songs and won her a Golden Gramophone Award and a Muz-TV Award. The same year, she played the role of Anna Sergeevna in the film Diamond Arm 2, which was panned by critics, and she voiced Gloria in the Russian dub of Happy Feet Two in 2011. Her third studio album Odinochestvo was released in May 2013 and includes collaborations with Stas Piekha, Grigory Leps, and Mitya Fomin, as well as the previously released "Never Too Late".

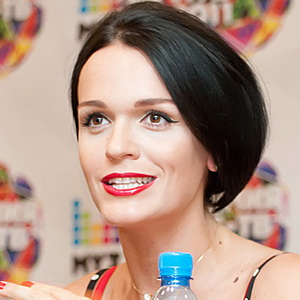
Slava at the 2011 Muz-TV Music Awards

In November 2013, Slanevskaya released "Pervaya lyubov - lyubov poslednyaya" ("The First Love Is the Last Love") with Irina Allegrova, which won her another Golden Gramophone Award. It was included on Slanevskaya's album Otkrovenno ("Frankly"), released in October 2015. The album also features collaborations with Lyubov Uspenskaya and Denis Klyaver. She performed a promotional concert at the State Kremlin Palace the day after its release. She played Catwoman in the 2015 film Double Trouble and performed the song "Malysh shlysh'" ("Baby Listen") for its soundtrack, which was included on Otkrovenno as well. Earlier in 2015, she had competed in the ninth season of Tantsy so zvyozdami, the Russian version of Dancing with the Stars. She and her dance partner Alexei Balash did not advance to the final.

=== 2016–present: Krik dushi and Slava ===
In 2016, Slanevskaya released the single "Krasniy (Ya smogu tebya zabyt')" ("Red (I Can Forget You)"). In 2017, she released multiple singles and was a contestant on the second season of the music competition Tri akkorda, finishing eighth out of 10. In October 2019, she performed a promotional concert at Crocus City Hall for her fifth studio album Krik dushi ("Cry of the Soul"), which was released the following month and contains the songs released since 2016 along with new tracks. The concert film was broadcast on Russian television.

Her self-titled sixth studio album Slava was released in September 2024. Featuring 10 previously released songs and one new track, it was accompanied by a promotional concert in Moscow celebrating her twentieth career anniversary.

== Personal life ==
Businessman Konstantin Morozov began a relationship with Slanevskaya when she was 16 and he was 26, and she gave birth to their daughter Alexandra Morozova in 1999. They separated shortly thereafter. From 2002 to 2024, she was in an on-again, off-again relationship with businessman Anatoly Danilitsky, who is 28 years older than her; they never married. Their daughter was born in December 2011. In March 2025, Slanevskaya indicated that she had a new partner, whose name she did not disclose.

At the age of 42, Slanevskaya became a grandmother after her eldest daughter Alexandra Morozova and her husband had a son in March 2023.

== Views and sanctions ==
In 2018, Slanevskaya criticised the use of federal channels to raise funds for sick children. She argued that it was a form of self-promotion for Russian officials and their spouses and urged them to "help quietly". In 2020, she said that she had contacted Russian president Vladimir Putin about helping cancer patients.

In March 2022, Slanevskaya expressed support for the Russian invasion of Ukraine. The following October, she called Russian celebrities who had left Russia "liars and cowards". On 19 October, she was added to Ukraine's sanctions list on grounds of "propaganda for the Putin regime and support for the war against Ukraine". A few days later, she recorded a video message for Russian troops, expressing her love for them and thanking them for their participation in the invasion. In June 2023, Russian musician Vladimir Kiselyov launched a cash prize for the Russian military if they destroy Leopard 1 and Leopard 2 tanks belonging to the Ukrainian military. Slanevskaya was one of multiple other Russian public figures to join the initiative.

== Discography ==
=== Studio albums ===
- 2004: Попутчица
- 2006: Классный
- 2013: Одиночество
- 2015: Откровенно
- 2019: Крик души
- 2024: Слава

=== Compilation albums ===
- 2007: The Best
