= Safar Shakeyev =

- Born: September 2, 1991; Kokshetau, Kokshetau region, Kazakhstan.
- Died: July 17, 2016 (aged 24)
- Education: The Athenian High School, Danville, CA, USA
- Alma mater: Chapman University, Orange, CA, USA
- Occupations: Filmmaker, Director, Screenwriter, Producer and Actor
- Years active: 2006–2016

Safar Shakeyev was a Kazakh filmmaker, director, screenwriter, producer and actor. He was born on September 2, 1991 in the city of Kokshetau of Kokshetau region. His father is composer and singer Yerkesh Shakeyev.

Shakeyev was the winner of the third Kazakhstan competition on social advertising films. He was also winner of the NFFTY 2011 in the category Best experimental film, with the film Facing you.

== Achievements and creativity ==
Safar was a finalist and winner of many international film festivals, including: «LA Shorts Fest» (Los Angeles, CA, USA) Finalist - Best Short Film ( «Thank You for Flying») [9] [10] «National Film Festival for Talented Youth» (Seattle, WA, USA) - Finalist Best Short Film ( «Lotus») «Astana International Film Festival» (Astana, Kazakhstan) - a finalist in the category Art Fest ( «Offset») « «National Film Festival for Talented Youth» (Seattle, WA, USA) - finalist of the best alternative cinema ( «One») «Bay Area High School Film Festival» (San Francisco, CA, USA) - winner of the best short film ( «Minus One») [11] «Future of Cinema International Film Festival» (Interlochen, MI, USA) - Finalist - Best Short Film ( «Minus One»)

Safar also has created clip "Sport", with the participation of famous Kazakhstani athletes (Aset, Nurmakhan)

== Education ==
- 2007-2010 The Athenian School, Danville, CA, USA.
- 2010-2014 Chapman University, Orange, CA, USA. Faculty of Film Directing (Film Production / Directing).

=== Additional Education ===
- 2008 New York Film Academy, Hollywood, CA, USA. Acting.
- 2009 New York Film Academy, Hollywood, CA, USA. Filmmaking.

== Career ==
- 2012 - The music video "Radioveter" director / editor / actor
- 2011 - The music video "Sport" Director / Editor
- 2011 - The music video "Love Me" Director / Editor
- 2014 - Caliber Media Company, Los Angeles, CA Entry
- 2014 - Thank you for flying, Los Angeles, CA, producer / director / writer / editor
- 2016 - Safar was the author and producer of Yrkesh Shakeyev's new album for piano and cello, which was recorded on 10–11 September in London at the legendary Abbey Road Studios. The recording was attended by well-known British musicians: pianist John Lenehan and cellist Alexander Baillie. Sound producer of the project was the famous British specialist Chris Krakker.

== Awards ==
- 2009 - «Future of Cinema International Film Festival» (Interlochen, MI, USA) - Finalist - Best Short Film ( «Minus One»)
- 2010 - «Bay Area High School Film Festival» (San Francisco, CA, USA) - winner of the best short film ( «Minus One»)
- 2011 - «National Film Festival for Talented Youth» (Seattle, WA, USA) - winner of Best Alternative Cinema ( «Facing You»)
- 2012 - «National Film Festival for Talented Youth» (Seattle, WA, USA) - finalist of the best alternative cinema ( «One»)
- 2012 - «Astana International Film Festival» (Astana, Kazakhstan) - a finalist in the category Art Fest ( «Offset»)
- 2013 - «National Film Festival for Talented Youth» (Seattle, WA, USA) - Finalist Best Short Film ( «Lotus»)
- 2014 - «LA Shorts Fest» (Los Angeles, CA, USA) Finalist - Best Short Film ( «Thank You for Flying»)
- 2015 - The winner of the third Kazakhstan competition on social advertising films, winner film is called «Lyubim prirodu- lyubim Kazakhstan»
