= Nobody Hurt No One =

Song performed by Natalia Podolskaya

Single by Natalia Podolskaya
- Released: February 25, 2005
- Recorded: 2005
- Genre: Pop rock
- Length: 3:00
- Label: Monolit Records; First Music Publishing
- Songwriters: Victor Drobysh; Jussi-Pekka Järvinen; Mary Susan Applegate
- Producers: Victor Drobysh; Iosif Prigozhin

Natalia Podolskaya singles chronology
"Pozdno" (2004)	"Nobody Hurt No One" (2005)	"Odna" (2005)

Music video
- "Nobody Hurt No One" on YouTube

Eurovision Song Contest 2005 entry
- Country: Russia
- Artist: Natalia Podolskaya
- Language: English
- Composer: Victor Drobysh
- Lyricists: Jussi-Pekka Järvinen; Mary Susan Applegate

Finals performance
- Final result: 15th
- Final points: 57

Entry chronology
- ◄ "Believe Me" (2004)
- "Never Let You Go" (2006) ►

"Nobody Hurt No One" is a song written by Victor Drobysh, Jussi-Pekka Järvinen, Mary Susan Applegate, produced by Victor Drobysh and Iosif Prigozhin, and performed by Belarusian singer Natalia Podolskaya. It represented Russia in the Eurovision Song Contest 2005.

The song won Russia's national selection for the Eurovision Song Contest 2005. As Russia had finished the Eurovision Song Contest 2004 in the top 12, the song was pre-qualified for the final, held in Kyiv, Ukraine. On the night, the song was performed 20th, following Greece's Helena Paparizou with "My Number One" and preceding Bosnia and Herzegovina's Feminnem with "Call Me". At the close of voting, it had received 57 points, placing 15th in a field of 24.

The song was succeeded as Russian representative by Dima Bilan with "Never Let You Go".

== Background ==
On September 1, 2004, a group of armed Islamic militants, mostly Ingush and Chechen, occupied School Number One (SNO) in the town of Beslan, North Ossetia (an autonomous republic in the North Caucasus region of the Russian Federation). The siege lasted three days and involved the illegal imprisonment of over 1,100 people as hostages (including 777 children). The hostage-takes demanded recognition of the independence of Chechnya at the UN and withdrawal of Russian troops from Chechnya. On the third day of the standoff, Russian security forces stormed the school building with the use of tanks, incendiary rockets and other heavy weapons. As of December 2006, 334 people (excluding terrorists) were killed, including 186 children.

Few months later, "Nobody Hurt No One" was announced as one of the 30 participants of the Russian national selection. On February 25, 2005, this song was selected as a winner of Russia's national selection for Eurovision.

== Music video ==
Igor Burloff directed the music video for the song. It was filmed in the late days of April 2005 in Helsinki inside Tavastia Club. The shooting of the video involved more than 500 people.

== Track listing ==
CD maxi single
No.	Title	Length
1.	"Nobody Hurt No One" (eurovision version)	3:00
2.	"Nobody Hurt No One" (radio edit)	3:17
3.	"Nobody Hurt No One" (Daleo remix)	3:03
4.	"Nobody Hurt No One" (Krazy Legs Ruff mix)	2:54
5.	"Pozdno (Russian: Поздно)" (bonus track)	3:32

== Charts ==
Chart (2005)	Peak position
Russian Airplay Chart	60
