= Greece in the Eurovision Song Contest 2005 =

- Eurovision Song Contest 2005
- Participating broadcaster: Hellenic Broadcasting Corporation (ERT)
- Country: Greece
- Selection process: Artist: Internal selection Song: Eurovision Party
- Selection date: Artist: 22 January 2005; Song: 2 March 2005

Competing entry
- Song: "My Number One"
- Artist: Helena Paparizou
- Songwriters: Christos Dantis; Natalia Germanou; Manos Psaltakis

Placement
- Final result: 1st, 230 points

Participation chronology

Greece was represented at the Eurovision Song Contest 2005 with the song "My Number One", written by Christos Dantis, Natalia Germanou, and Manos Psaltakis, and performed by Helena Paparizou. The Greek participating broadcaster, the Hellenic Broadcasting Corporation (ERT), selected its entry through a national final, after having previously selected the performer internally. "My Number One" was selected on 2 March 2005, where the public and a professional jury chose it over three other candidate songs. The entry eventually won the Eurovision Song Contest with 230 points, marking Greece's first ever victory at the contest.

To promote the entry, Paparizou made appearances in Andorra, Germany, Malta, Serbia and Montenegro, Portugal, Russia, Sweden, Turkey, and Ukraine, performing the song and meeting with local media. Greece was prequalified for the 2005 contest final, having placed third at the prior year's contest. At the 21 May final, Paparizou performed "My Number One" 19th out of the 24 participants and at the end of voting, the entry was awarded first place.

== Background ==
The Eurovision Song Contest 2005 marked Greece's twenty-sixth entry in the Eurovision Song Contest since its debut in 1974. Prior to the contest, its best result was third place which was achieved twice: in 2001 with the song "Die for You" performed by the duo Antique and in 2004 with "Shake It" performed by Sakis Rouvas. Greece's least successful result was in 1998 when it placed 20th with the song "Mia krifi evaisthisia" by Thalassa, receiving only twelve points in total, all from Cyprus.

As part of its duties as participating broadcaster, the Hellenic Broadcasting Corporation (ERT) organises the selection of its entry in the Eurovision Song Contest and broadcasts the event in the country. Its selection techniques have varied from national finals where the public selects the entry, to internal selections like used in 2004, where the broadcaster has complete control over the selection. For the 2005 contest, ERT decided to hold a televised national final after internally selecting an artist.

== Before Eurovision ==
=== Artist selection ===
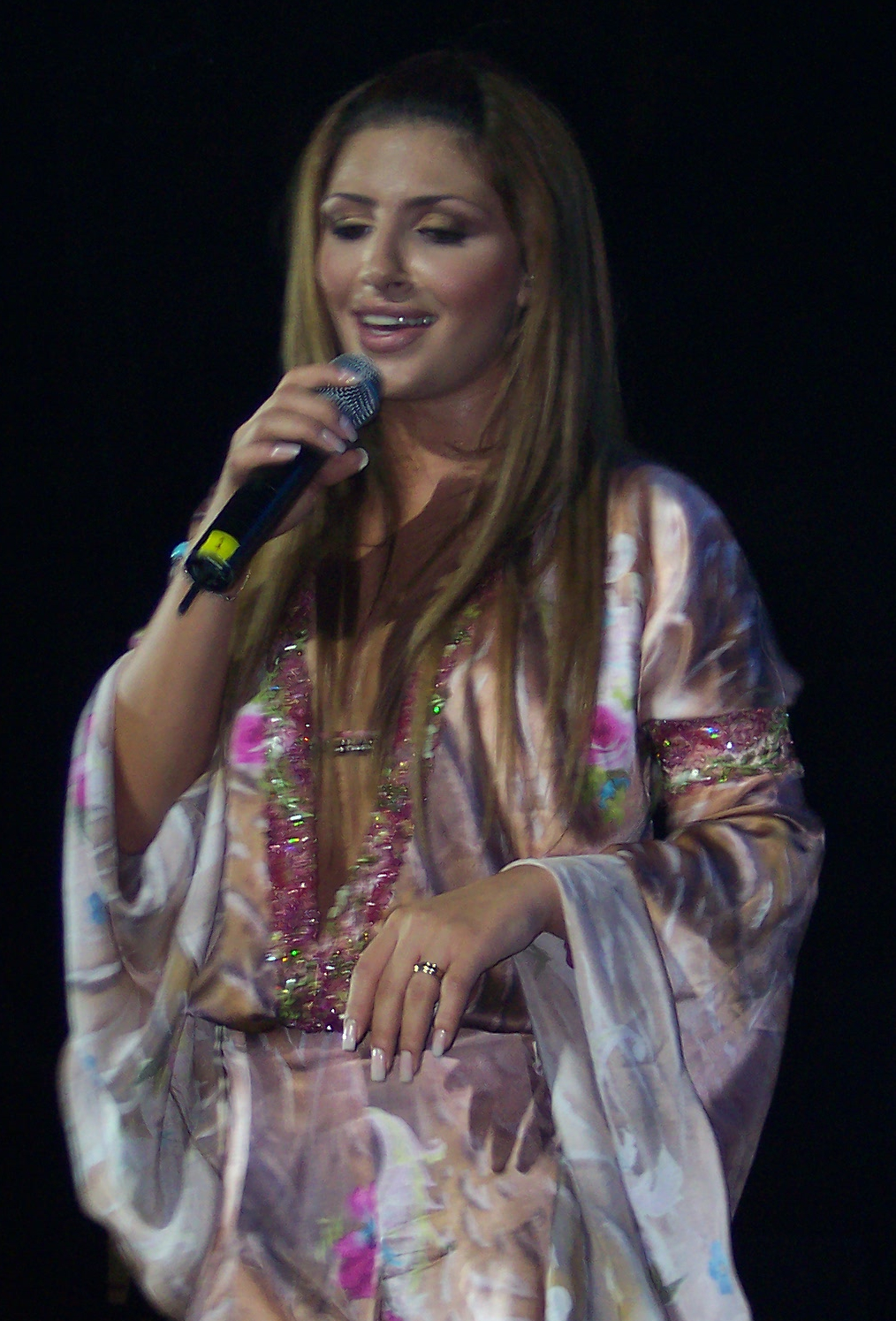
Selected entrant Helena Paparizou, pictured in 2005.

ERT announced that they would be selecting their artist for the Eurovision Song Contest 2005 internally. The first artist approached by ERT with an official proposal was 2004 representative Sakis Rouvas, with the broadcaster stating on 15 June 2004 during a press conference that they would like to have him represent them again if he would accept the offer. However, on 22 July 2004, he declined as he felt that another artist should receive the opportunity despite having considered the proposal. Another rumored artist was Anna Vissi, who stated in June 2004 that she "would go to Eurovision if she was asked to", however she later declined as she was in the United States promoting her song "Call Me" during the time of the contest. On 27 November 2004, Despina Vandi was reported to be representing Greece in the 2005 contest and was "ready to sign the necessary contracts", however it broke down due to conflicts with Vandi's record label Heaven Music over a term that required all of Vandi's songs to be written by popular Greek songwriter Phoebus. On 28 November 2004, ERT's Eurovision spokeswoman Dafni Bokota stated that Vandi and ERT were close to a deal, but had concluded that she was too expensive to send to the contest. She also stated that Vandi was worried about participating in Eurovision while her international career was going well, saying "Here at ERT, we don't understand [why] Greek artists are so insecure to participate". A decision was to be announced within the next five to ten days, and that a possible backup would be Helena Paparizou. Around the same time, Greek-American singer and Fame Story participant Annet Artani was also rumored, however negotiations failed to materialize. On 8 December 2004, Bokota once again stated that there would be a delay in the artist announcement because of an "obstacle" within the broadcaster. On 15 January 2005, Star Channel reported that front runners Franz Ferdinand met with ERT but were soon excluded as they were requesting more money, and had "no idea how Eurovision works and thus they proposed to compose a remake of a past song of theirs".

On 22 January 2005, ERT confirmed Helena Paparizou as the Greek representative for the 2005 contest. Paparizou had previously represented Greece in 2001 as part of Antique. ERT also stated that Paparizou's singing career in Sweden was "a factor which surely contributed to the final choice of Paparizou, since the 'northern' votes are considered to be important".

=== Eurovision Party ===
Following the announcement of Paparizou as its representative, ERT revealed that she would perform four songs during a national final, titled Eurovision Party. Fifteen songs were shortlisted out of 100 submitted by Greek and foreign composers, and four were selected by a jury panel consisting of Paparizou and representatives from ERT and Sony BMG. On 18 February 2005, the four songs were presented during the special ERT program EuroMania. It was also announced during the program that Fokas Evangelinos would be the choreographer for all four competing songs. On 19 February 2005, "The Light in Our Soul", composed by Kostas Bigalis, was disqualified as the song had been released and made available on Amazon.de by the band Big Alice before the 1 October cutoff date. An additional program was broadcast on 25 February 2005 in order to familiarize the Greek public with the selected artist.

==== Final ====
The final took place on 2 March 2005 at the Fever Music Center in Athens, hosted by Greek-Swedish journalist Alexandra Pascalidou. Helena Paparizou performed all three songs and the winning song, "My Number One", was selected by a combination of public voting (60%) and jury voting (40%). The jury, consisting of Mimis Plessas, Antonis Andrikakis, Kostas Tournas, Željko Joksimović (who represented Serbia and Montenegro in 2004), Betty Golema, Ion Stamboulis, Fotini Giannoulatou, Sietse Bakker and Christos Liritzis, each assigned scores to each song ranging from 1 (lowest) to 10 (highest). 7 jurors gave the highest score to "My Number One", and both "OK" and "Let's Get Wild" were the first choices of one juror. Public voting was conducted through telephone or SMS, with 229,368 votes being cast during the show. In addition to the performances of the competing entries, the interval acts featured guest performances by Marian van de Wal (who would represent Andorra in 2005), Glennis Grace (who would represent the Netherlands in 2005), Željko Joksimović, Swedish band Alcazar and Greek musical group C:Real.

Final – 2 March 2005
R/O	Song	Songwriter(s)	Jury	Televote	Total	Place
1	"My Number One"	Christos Dantis, Natalia Germanou, Manos Psaltakis	83	152,269	66.47%	1
2	"OK"	Christodoulos Siganos, Valentino	46	73,500	24.55%	2
3	"Let's Get Wild"	Douglas Carr	48	20,500	8.98%	3

=== Promotion ===
Before her appearance at the contest, Paparizou went on a promotional tour sponsored by the Greek Ministry of Tourism and the Greek National Tourism Organization, singing her song in several Eurovision countries. The tour started off on 12 March 2005 in Berlin, Germany, where she visited the International Tourism Exchange Show, performing "My Number One". The next stop was Moscow, Russia, where Paparizou taped a show for MTV Russia and then presented the Greek song at the International Tourism Exhibit, the largest tourism exhibit in the world. She also gave several interviews to the press and before leaving, attended a Greek Independence Day reception at the Greek embassy. Upon her return to Greece, she was greeted at the airport by fans along with the music video of "My Number One" playing on the video monitors. While in Greece, she attended the opening ceremony of the European final four for the Volleyball Champions League in Pylaia, where her song was played as she appeared on stage with cheerleaders.

On 29 March 2005, Paparizou arrived in Valletta, Malta where she signed autographs, appeared on television stations, and gave interviews to the local media. She then traveled to Serbia and Montenegro where she gave additional interviews before moving on to Andorra on 10 April 2005. She was soon in Lisbon, Portugal, where she promoted not only her song, but also Greek export products, as she was sponsored by the Greek tourism industry. She also attended an international exhibition of food and drink where the song was played, while its music video was seen on a large monitor.

On 20 April 2005, Paparizou arrived in Sweden where she had started her singing career as part of Antique. She was interviewed by many of the local media outlets and could be heard on radio stations around Stockholm. Following her stay in Sweden, Paparizou flew to Istanbul, Turkey, where the Greek delegation met with Patriarch Bartholomew I of Constantinople, who told her that it was good luck that the contest fell on her name-day of 21 May 2005. While in Turkey, she also posed for magazines and was interviewed by the media. She soon returned to Greece before leaving for a short trip to Kyiv, the location of the contest.

== At Eurovision ==
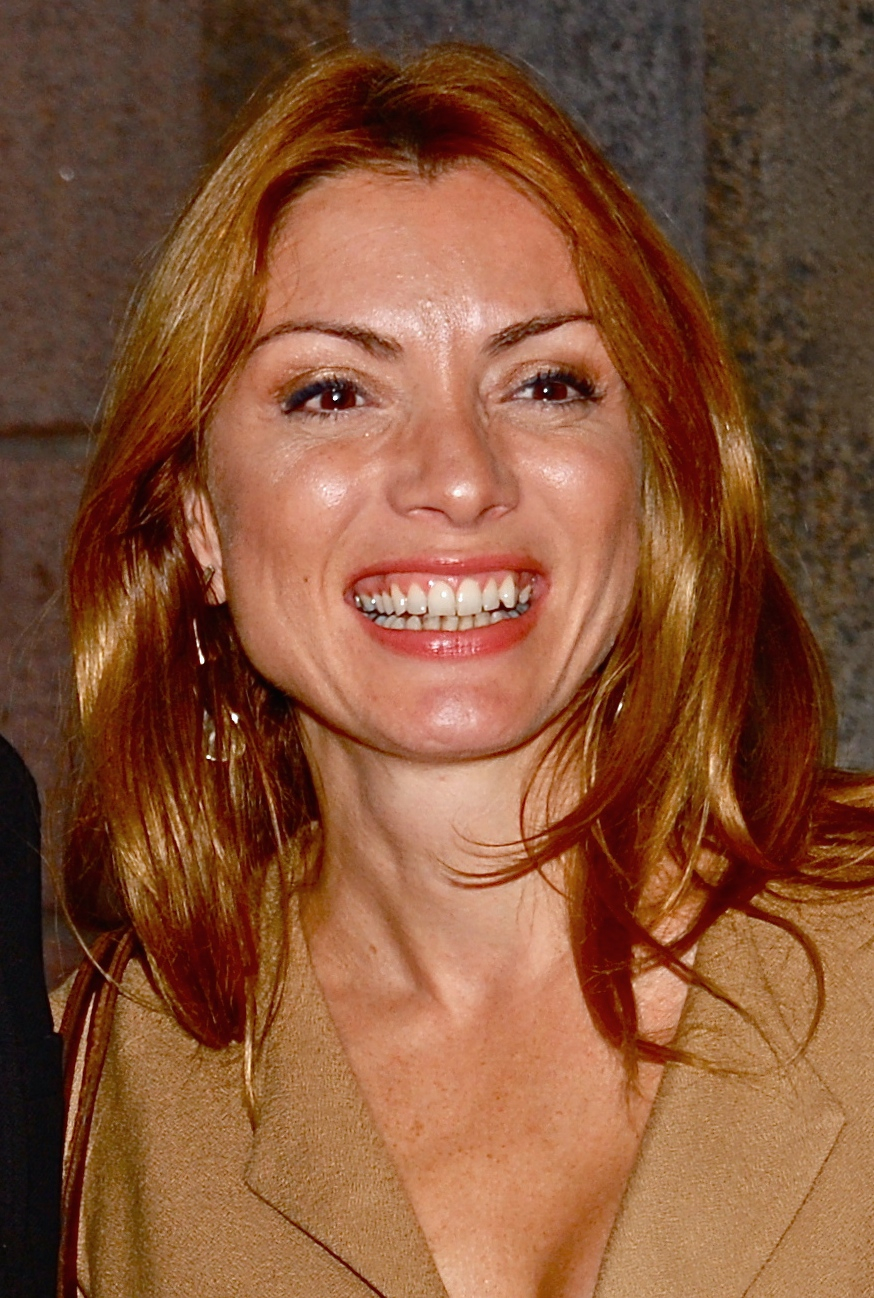
Alexandra Pascalidou replaced Dafni Bokota as the Eurovision commentator.

The Eurovision Song Contest 2005 took place at the Palace of Sports in Kyiv, Ukraine and consisted of one semi-final on 19 May, and the final on 21 May 2005. As Greece had finished the Eurovision Song Contest 2004 in third place, its entry was pre-qualified for the final the following year. Greece was drawn to perform 19th on the night, following Croatia's "Vukovi umiru sami" by Boris Novković and Lado, and preceding Russia's "Nobody Hurt No One" by Natalia Podolskaya. Paparizou appeared confident on stage and her dancers prepared a show with carefully choreographed stage moves. She wore a short orange-yellow dress while the dancers wore tan colored clothing. The performance included Paparizou playing the lyra, a Greek musical instrument and the backing dancers forming the number 1 on stage. The final was hosted and commentated on Greek television by Alexandra Pascalidou, who also hosted the national final, while the spokesperson who revealed Greece's votes for other countries was Alexis Kostalas, an ERT Board member who had been the spokesperson since 1998.

"My Number One" won with a total of 230 points. It received 12 points, the maximum number of points a country can give to another country, from Albania, Belgium, Bulgaria, Cyprus, Germany, Hungary, Serbia and Montenegro, Sweden, the United Kingdom, and Turkey. The highest viewing ratings in the history of Greek television were recorded during the presentation of the pure gold trophy to Helena Paparizou by the Ukrainian president Viktor Yushchenko, with 94.2% of the Greek population tuned in.

=== Voting ===
Voting during the three shows involved each country awarding points from 1–8, 10 and 12 to the other competing countries; counties were not allowed to register votes for themselves. All countries participating in the contest were required to use televoting and/or SMS voting during both evenings of the contest. Greece awarded its top 12 points from televoting to Romania in the semi-final and to Cyprus in the final. The tables below visualise a complete breakdown of points awarded to Greece in the final of the Eurovision Song Contest 2005, as well as by the country in the semi-final and final.

==== Points awarded to Greece ====
Map of points awarded to Greece in the final of the Eurovision Song Contest 2005.

Points awarded to Greece (Final)
Score	Country
12 points	Albania; Belgium; Bulgaria; Cyprus; Germany; Hungary; Serbia and Montenegro; Sweden; Turkey; United Kingdom
10 points	Netherlands; Romania
8 points	France; Spain
7 points	Israel; Macedonia; Switzerland
6 points	Bosnia and Herzegovina; Malta
5 points	Croatia
4 points	Andorra; Austria; Moldova; Norway; Russia
3 points	Finland; Portugal
2 points	Denmark; Iceland; Ireland; Slovenia
1 point	Lithuania; Poland

==== Points awarded by Greece ====
Points awarded by Greece (Semi-final)
Score	Country
12 points	Romania
10 points	Poland
8 points	Belarus
7 points	Bulgaria
6 points	Moldova
5 points	Hungary
4 points	Norway
3 points	Switzerland
2 points	Denmark
1 point	Austria

Points awarded by Greece (Final)
Score	Country
12 points	Cyprus
10 points	Albania
8 points	Malta
7 points	Moldova
6 points	Serbia and Montenegro
5 points	Romania
4 points	Norway
3 points	Switzerland
2 points	Hungary
1 point	Latvia

== After Eurovision ==
=== Reception ===
Paparizou's first words after winning the 50th Eurovision Song Contest were "We showed the modern face of Greece. I reckon that’s the face everybody loves. Europe is our home!" Upon arrival back in Greece, she was greeted by crowds of fans at Eleftherios Venizelos Airport and the National Fire Brigade created a water-jet archway for her airplane, suggestively bearing the number "001", to pass through after it had landed. On the way to ERT Studios for a welcome party for Paparizou and the Greek delegation, people were standing on either side of the road throwing rose petals along the route of Paparizou's bus. When she reached ERT Studios, she was "met with deafening applause" and after moving from sight for a few minutes, she emerged on stage dressed in the Greek flag and holding the Eurovision trophy.

"My Number One" did very well in the music charts, being certified platinum in Greece and gold in Sweden while climbing to number one on both charts and charting for an extended number of weeks. It also charted in other European countries such as Germany, Switzerland, and Austria. It was later released in the United States as a CD Single with remixes and reached number eight on the US Billboard Hot Dance Club Play charting for eight weeks.

=== Congratulations: 50 Years of the Eurovision Song Contest ===
Among the distinctions awarded to "My Number One" was that it was chosen among thirteen other Eurovision songs to compete in Congratulations: 50 Years of the Eurovision Song Contest, a 50th anniversary special in 2005, just a few months after Paparizou's victory. It was the only Greek entry and one of three winners from the '00s to compete (alongside "Fly on the Wings of Love" by the Olsen Brothers and "Everyway That I Can" by Sertab Erener). The song closed the first round of the contest in slot 14, following 1976 winner "Save Your Kisses for Me" by Brotherhood of Man. Paparizou appeared on stage during the performance, lip-syncing along with a section of the song. At the end of the first round, "My Number One" was announced as one of the five songs proceeding to the second and final round. It was later revealed that it placed fourth in the first round, with 167 points (in both rounds, Greece were allowed to award themselves the maximum twelve points, a privilege usually not given at Eurovision).

"My Number One" finished fourth in the final round, scoring 245 points. This was 15 points more than her winning score at Eurovision; however, all countries could give each song in the final no fewer than six points, meaning that unlike in Eurovision, "My Number One" earned points from all the voting countries.

==== Voting ====
Points awarded to "My Number One" (Round 1)
Score	Country
12 points	Bosnia and Herzegovina; Cyprus; Greece; Romania
10 points	Sweden
8 points	
7 points	Belgium; Russia; Serbia and Montenegro; Spain; Ukraine
6 points	Iceland; Turkey
5 points	Andorra; Germany; Lithuania; Macedonia; Slovenia; Switzerland
4 points	Croatia; Ireland; Malta; Monaco; Poland
3 points	Latvia; Norway
2 points	Austria; Denmark
1 point	Netherlands; Portugal

Points awarded to "My Number One" (Round 2)
Score	Country
12 points	Bosnia and Herzegovina; Cyprus; Greece; Serbia and Montenegro
10 points	Germany; Romania; Sweden; Turkey
8 points	Andorra; Ireland; Switzerland; Ukraine
7 points	Belgium; Croatia; Denmark; Latvia; Lithuania; Malta; Netherlands; Norway; Poland; Russia; Spain
6 points	Austria; Finland; Iceland; Israel; Macedonia; Monaco; Portugal; Slovenia
