= Yulia Savicheva =

Russian singer (born 1987)

- Юлия Савичева
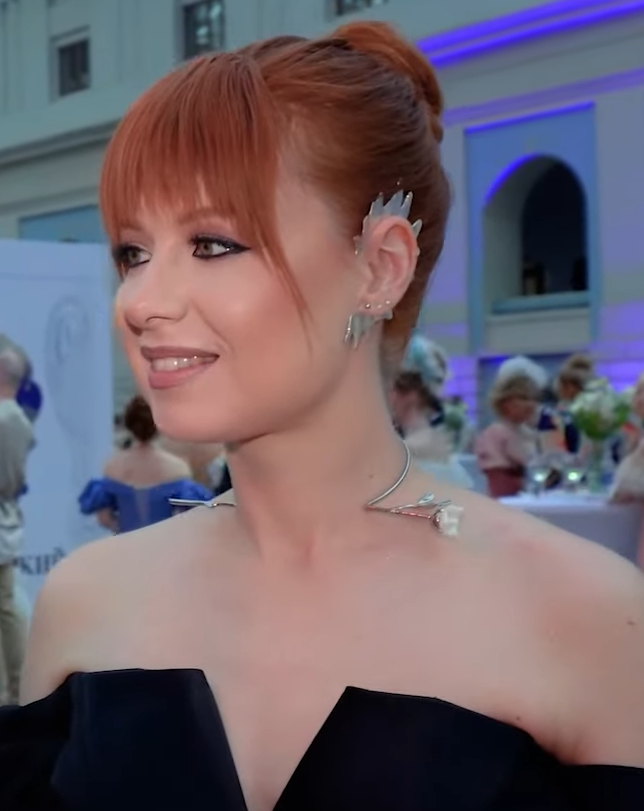
- Savicheva in 2024
- Born: 14 February 1987 (age 39); Kurgan, Kurgan Oblast, Russian SFSR, Soviet Union
- Years active: 1991–present
- Website: savicheva.ru

Yulia Stanislavovna Savicheva (Russian: Ю́лия Станисла́вовна Са́вичева; born 14 February 1987) is a Russian singer. She represented Russia at the Eurovision Song Contest 2004.

== Biography ==
Savicheva was born on 14 February 1987 into a family of musicians in the city of Kurgan Kurgan Oblast, Russian SFSR, Union of Soviet Socialist Republics. Frequent visitors to her parents' home included several Russian songwriters and music producers. Yulia's father, Stanislav Borisovich Savichev (born 1967, an avid piano player) would regularly compose songs for his daughter to sing; this would subsequently prove to be the beginning of Yulia's career as a singer.

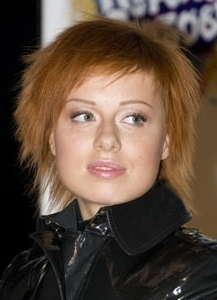
Savicheva in 2009

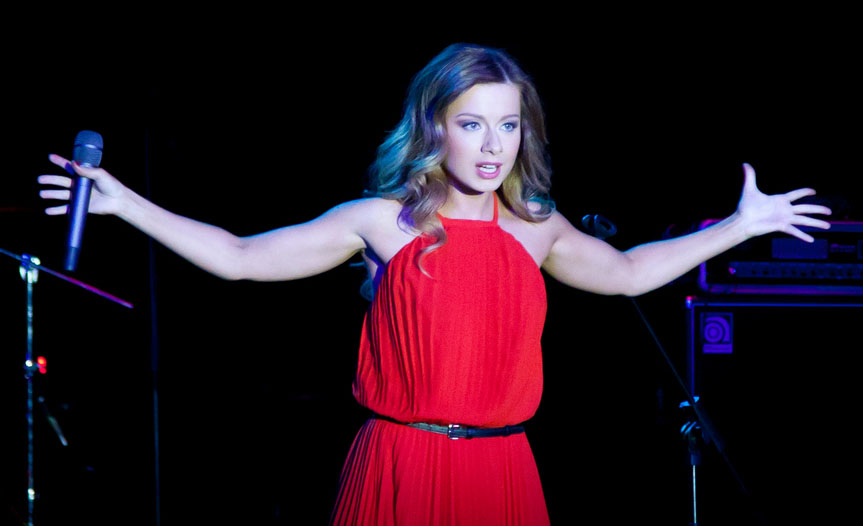
Savicheva performing in Severodvinsk, May 2013

Savicheva's first onstage experience as a singer occurred at the age of four, with the group Agatha Christie. Her dancing there earned her a standing ovation. After this, she began participating in a dance group where, despite her age, she performed as a soloist. A year later, when she was six, the group (in which her father also worked) was invited to work in Moscow. There, she participated in several musical events in the recreation center at MAI. Meanwhile, her mother got a job at the recreation center as manager of the children's department.

All of Yulia's free time was spent with musicians in the recreation center or in the theater. Her first major appearance was a lead role in the recreation center's New Year's performance, which was her first paid performance and for which Yulia had to learn ballroom dancing. At the same time, she was also studying in school and participating in the dance group Zhuravushka.

Her creative potential led to an invitation from L. Azadanova, offering Yulia a place in her dance group, which she took up. It was then that Yulia began to sing as well as dance. Later, in 2001, the producer Poleiko invited her to play the lead role in the New Year's performance at the Cathedral of Christ the Savior, which she did with such success that she was chosen to play the lead in the next year's performance as well.

In March 2003, Star Factory started its 2nd season. The producer of the project, Maxim Fadeev, had already crossed Yulia's path once before when she had worked as back-vocalist on Russian artist Linda's album, Vorona (Crow) in 1996. Although Yulia participated in the contest, she was eliminated in the semi-finals. Despite this, however, her songs went on to become hits, including "Korabli" (Ships), "Vysoko" (High) and "Prosti za lyubov'" (Sorry for Loving You); and Yulia later came back to host the show.

In March 2004, Yulia participated in another contest, World's Best, as Russia had finished the Eurovision Song Contest 2003 in the top 11, the song was pre-qualified for the final. In the final, it was performed fourteenth she, came 11th with her song, "Believe Me". Her first album was finally released in 2005 with the title Vysoko. About half the material on the album was co-written with former musicians from the band Total.

In August 2005, Savicheva wrote the song, "Esli v serdtse zhivyot lyubov" (If Love Lives in Your Heart), which became the theme for the TV series Not born beautiful on STS. The song went on to become yet another hit, and she released an album of the same name in November. The album included the title track as well as live versions of songs from her first album. In June 2006, she released Magnit, on which Anastasia Maksimova wrote the majority of the songs. This, too, was very successful.

In September 2007, Savicheva performed concerts in the Japanese cities of Tokyo and Osaka. In February 2008, she released an album titled Origami. Her latest single, "Goodbye, Lyubov'" announces a new album which is yet to be finalised.

And adding up to all that she was in the musical "That Kind of Music". Acting as the daughter of a Ballet dancer who owns a big studio, but since they are about to lose it "Yulia Savicheva" and her friends try to help by making a musical of their own to earn money and this is done with help from the soccer team.

== Sanctions ==
On 7 January 2023, Savicheva was added to Ukraine's sanctions list as one of the public figures who support the Russian invasion of Ukraine.

== Discography ==
=== Studio albums ===
- 2005: Высоко (High)
- 2006: Магнит (Magnet)
- 2008: Оригами (Origami)
- 2012: Сердцебиение (Heartbeat)
- 2014: Личное... (Private...)
- 2020: CLV
- 2025: 9

== Honours and awards ==
- Medal "For Faith and Goodness" (Kemerovo Oblast, June 2013)

Awards and achievements
Preceded by t.A.T.u. with "Ne ver', ne boysia"	Russia in the Eurovision Song Contest; 2004	Succeeded by Natalia Podolskaya with "Nobody Hurt No One"
