= Chay Vdvoyom =

Russian pop band

Chay Vdvoyom Чай вдвоём
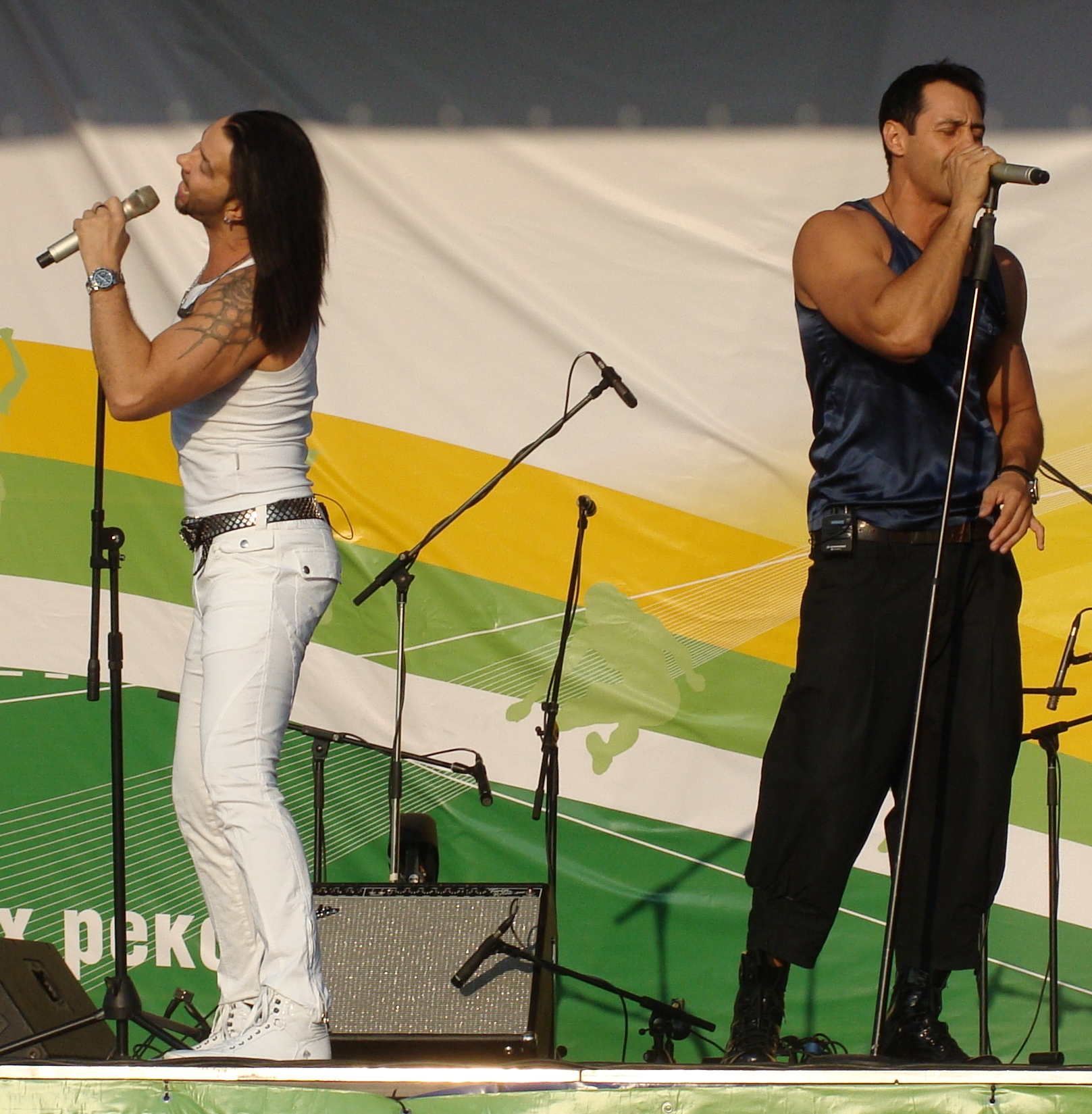
- Chai Vdvoyom in Koryazhma, in 2010

Background information
- Origin: Saint Petersburg, Russia
- Genres: Pop, pop rock
- Years active: 1994—2012
- Labels: Monolit Records (Монолит Рекордс)
- Members: Stanislav Kostyushkin; Denis Klyaver
- Website: chaivdvoem.ru

Chay Vdvoyom (Russian: Чай вдвоём – Tea for Two) was a Russian pop music band, formed by Denis Klyaver and Stanislav Kostyushkin, which existed from 1994 until 2012.

== Discography ==
Albums

- 2007 - Прости (Prosti; Sorry)
- 2005 - Вечернее чаепитие (Vecherneye Chayepitie; Evening Tea Party)
- 2004 - Утреннее чаепитие (Utrenneye Chayepitie; Morning Tea Party)
- 2004 - 10 тысяч слов о любви (10 tysyach slov o lyubi; 10 Thousands Words About Love)
- 2002 - Ласковая моя (Laskovaya moya; My Tender)
- 2000 - Неродная (Nerodnaya')
- 1999 - Ради тебя (Radi tebya; For You)
- 1998 - Попутчица (Poputchitsa; Fellow [female] traveler)
- 1997 - Я не забуду (Ya ne zabudu; I don't Forget)

1997 — Я не забуду...
No.	Title	Length
1.	"Посмотри в окно"	4:28
2.	"Я не забуду"	4:44
3.	"Я пойду"	4:31
4.	"Честно говоря"	3:45
5.	"Гобоган 1"	3:36
6.	"Черемуха"	3:57
7.	"Мой папа джазмен"	4:57
8.	"Ангел"	3:37
9.	"Колыбельная"	5:02
10.	"Тот, что женился на ней"	3:47
11.	"Гобоган 2"	3:54
12.	"Кода"	2:27

1998 — Попутчица
No.	Title	Length
1.	"Попутчица"	4:04
2.	"Камчатка"	4:01
3.	"Её больше нет"	5:13
4.	"Душка"	3:32
5.	"Я тебя не вижу"	4:00
6.	"Не плачь"	3:41
7.	"Считалка"	3:52
8.	"Зимняя сказка"	3:46
9.	"Девочка"	2:37
10.	"Волна"	5:16
11.	"Мой голос не для тебя"	5:05

1999 — Ради тебя
No.	Title	Length
1.	"Ради тебя"	4:12
2.	"Проходная"	3:49
3.	"Он тебе не нужен"	3:42
4.	"Немного денса"	3:46
5.	"Мальчишка, которому даже 16 нет"	4:09
6.	"Всё хорошо"	3:29
7.	"Ты куда"	3:54
8.	"Дожди"	4:21
9.	"Не молчи"	5:05
10.	"Он тебе не нужен (Remix)"	4:34

2000 — Неродная
No.	Title	Length
1.	"Неродная"	4:11
2.	"Прощай рассвет"	3:59
3.	"Гори любовь"	4:21
4.	"Возвращайся"	4:39
5.	"Дай мне ответ"	3:56
6.	"Ты пойми"	4:15
7.	"Сто к одному"	4:14
8.	"Милый, постой" (feat. Лайма Вайкуле)	3:37
9.	"Камчатка (Remix)"	3:58
10.	"Десять мыслей"	2:58

2002 — Ласковая моя...
No.	Title	Length
1.	"Ласковая моя"	3:57
2.	"Моя"	4:22
3.	"Самба"	4:02
4.	"Желтые листья"	3:38
5.	"Подожди"	4:19
6.	"Метель"	3:47
7.	"Попутчица"	4:01
8.	"Летний дождь"	4:52
9.	"Письмо"	4:35
10.	"Если бы я был девчонкой"	3:29
11.	"Сынок"	4:18
12.	"Ласковая моя (DJ Remix)"	5:04
13.	"Ласковая моя (ППК Remix)"	8:45

2005 — 10 тысяч слов о любви
No.	Title	Length
1.	"Ты не одна"	4:12
2.	"Милая"	4:20
3.	"Желанная"	4:03
4.	"День рождения"	3:46
5.	"Любила не меня"	4:42
6.	"Не первая любовь"	3:55
7.	"Милый, постой" (feat. Лайма Вайкуле)	3:59
8.	"Сынок"	4:22
9.	"Белая ночь"	4:21
10.	"А ты всё ждёшь"	3:12
11.	"Я тебя не вижу (DJ Shuri & DJ Tisha Remix)"	3:52
12.	"Он не разлюбит"	4:19
13.	"Желанная (DJ Radius Remix)"	3:49
14.	"День рождения (DJ Radius Remix)"	4:28
15.	"День рождения (DJ Skydrimer Remix)"	3:53
16.	"День рождения (DJ Skydrimer Brothers Hypnotize Remix)"	6:33

2005 — Утреннее чаепитие
No.	Title	Length
1.	"Ласковая моя"	3:57
2.	"День рождения"	3:46
3.	"Он тебе не нужен"	3:42
4.	"Моя"	4:23
5.	"Желтые листья"	3:38
6.	"Я пойду"	4:29
7.	"Желанная"	4:04
8.	"Летний дождь"	4:53
9.	"Всё хорошо"	3:29
10.	"Девочка"	2:35
11.	"Её больше нет"	5:11
12.	"Любила не меня"	4:42
13.	"Милая"	4:21
14.	"Метель"	3:48
15.	"Письмо"	5:04
16.	"Ты пойми"	4:15
17.	"Мой папа джазмен"	4:53
18.	"Зимняя сказка"	3:45

2005 — Вечернее чаепитие
No.	Title	Length
1.	"А ты всё ждёшь"	3:13
2.	"Камчатка"	4:00
3.	"Не родная"	4:11
4.	"Белая ночь"	4:22
5.	"Сынок"	4:19
6.	"Он не разлюбит"	4:19
7.	"Если был бы я девчонкой"	3:29
8.	"Душка" (feat. Лайма Вайкуле)	3:31
9.	"Ради тебя"	4:13
10.	"Дожди"	4:20
11.	"Проходная"	3:49
12.	"Прощай, рассвет"	3:59
13.	"Дай мне ответ"	3:56
14.	"Попутчица"	4:03
15.	"Мальчишка"	4:10

2006 — Прости...
No.	Title	Length
1.	"Прости..."	3:56
2.	"Москва С.Н.В."	3:35
3.	"Письма"	4:04
4.	"Заколдованный круг"	3:15
5.	"Падали звёзды"	3:59
6.	"Новогодний поцелуй"	3:51
7.	"Ты не одна"	4:12
8.	"Отбой"	4:31
9.	"Заберу тебя с собой"	4:30
10.	"24 часа"	4:21
11.	"На небе облака"	4:35
12.	"Я и ты"	3:56

2007 — Кавер-версии
No.	Title	Length
1.	"Я гляжу ей вслед"	2:44
2.	"Мы бандито"	2:17
3.	"Макароны"	2:52
4.	"Тук тук тук"	2:42
5.	"Ты погоди, не спеши"	3:23
6.	"Два весёлых гуся"	4:20
7.	"Брестская улица"	3:18
8.	"Возвращайся"	3:58
9.	"Скалолазка"	3:12
10.	"Город"	4:00
11.	"Бомбардировщики"	3:16
12.	"Золото"	3:19
13.	"Я хочу тебя видеть"	4:00
14.	"Весь век мы поём"	3:50
15.	"Пингвины"	2:18

2012 — Белое платье
No.	Title	Length
1.	"Время вода"	4:07
2.	"Господин Президент"	4:27
3.	"Просто друг"	4:02
4.	"Белое платье"	4:13
5.	"Посмотри мне в глаза" (feat. Юлия Ковальчук)	4:10
6.	"Улетай"	4:17
7.	"Слёзы любви"	4:09
8.	"Виниловое сердце"	3:50
9.	"Обними меня" (feat. Ольга Полякова)	3:29
10.	"Вместе с тобой"	4:33
11.	"5-ый элемент"	3:59
12.	"Новогодний поцелуй (Remix)"	3:32
13.	"Алые паруса" (feat. 3XL PRO)	4:03

== Awards ==
- 2001: "Song of the Year" award (Песня года) for "Laskovaya Moya" ("Ласковая моя")
- 2001: Golden Gramophone Award with "Laskovaya Moya" («Ласковая моя»)
- 2002: Golden Gramophone Award with «Чтобы ты была моя»
- 2002: "Song of the Year" award (Песня года) for "Сынок"
- 2003: Golden Gramophone Award with «Желанная»
- 2004: "Bomb of the Year", "100% Hit" (Бомба года, Стопудовый хит)
- 2005: Golden Gramophone Award with «День рождения»
- 2006: Golden Gramophone Award with «24 часа»
- 2010: Golden Gramophone Award with «Белое платье»
