= Anastasia Stotskaya =

Russian singer (born 1982)

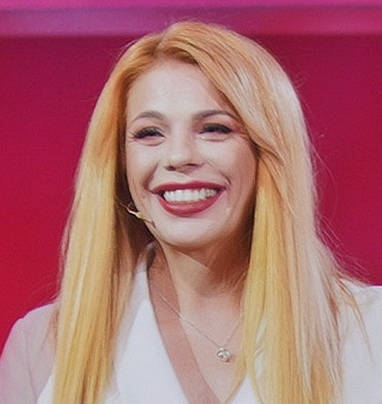

Background information
- Born: Anastasia Aleksandrovna Stotskaya; 8 October 1982 (age 44); Kyiv, Kyiv Oblast, Ukrаninian SSR
- Genres: Pop; musical
- Occupations: Singer; actress
- Years active: 2000–present
- Website: stotskaya.ru
- Musical career
- Genre: Pop
- Instrument: Vocals
- Labels: Velvet; Moon; Monolit; Misteriya Zvuka; Pervoye Muzykalnoye

Anastasia Aleksandrovna Stotskaya (Russian: Анастасия Александровна Стоцкая; born 8 October 1982) is a Russian pop singer and actress.

== Early life ==
Anastasia Stotskaya was born on 8 October 1982 in Kyiv in the family of a resuscitation doctor and an artist. From the age of five, she has toured with popular children's music groups in the country. She lived in Kyiv until 1992, when she and her family moved to Moscow to support her brother's acting career. After finishing secondary school, she entered the Russian Academy of Theatre Arts, studying musical acting.

== Career ==
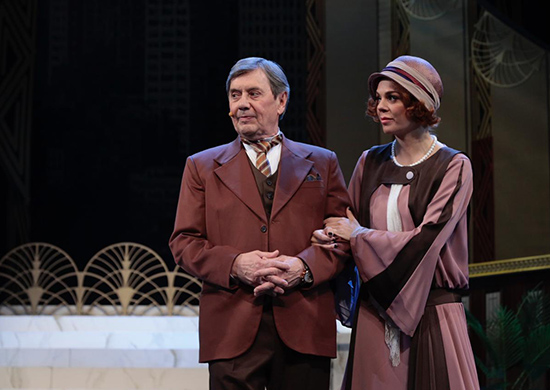
Stotskaya in the play Ledi na den' in 2020.

Stotskaya first rose to prominence at the age of 18, when she played the role of Fleur-de-Lys in the musical Notre Dame de Paris in the Theater of the Moon. She was noticed by Philipp Kirkorov, who in 2002 became Stotskaya's producer. First, he invited her to the auditions at the musical Chicago, and then under his direction, Stotskaya recorded the first songs for a solo music project. They signed a collaboration contract for five years.

In 2003, Stotskaya participated in the International Competition of Young Performers New Wave, where she won the Grand Prix. Success in the contest was brought to her by performing a cover version of "Can't Take My Eyes Off You" and also singing a new song "Veny-reki". "Veny-reki" delivered Stotskaya her first and only Golden Gramophone Award nomination. With the song, she also performed at Pesnya goda. Subsequently in December 2003, she released a duet with Kirkorov titled "Vlyublyonnaya dusha", which peaked the TopHit airplay charts at #16. In 2004, she released two more singles which both made the top 20 of the airplay charts, including another duet with Kirkorov.

Stotskaya participated in the Russian national selection for the Eurovision Song Contest 2005 with the song "Shadows dance all around". She finished second in the first semi-final of 4 February 2005 and qualified to the final of 25 February 2005, where she eventually finished third.

After this, she started focusing more on acting and television work. She participated in the first season of the Channel One Russia series Circus with the Stars in 2007. In April 2010, she won the fifth season of the Russian version of Dancing with the Stars, alongside her dance partner Alexey Ledenyov. From March until May 2013, she participated in the first season of One to One! on Channel One Russia, where eventually finished fifth overall. In 2016, she participated in the Ordinary People's series of the show on Russia-1.

In 2016, Stotskaya was selected as one of the Russian jurors of the Eurovision Song Contest that year. During the Jury Show of the first semi-final, Stotskaya broadcast live via Periscope and showed her scorecard as well as several of the performances, including Armenia and the Netherlands. Stotskaya was eventually evicted from the jury after the incident.

In the latter half of the 2010s and early 2020s, Stotskaya solely worked in theatre, playing in several musicals and plays, including in the Russian Army Theatre.

In 2021, Stotskaya told Cosmopolitan Russia that she had never ambitioned a singing career. Next to that, she stated that two albums that had been attributed to her name, were both pirate collections of her songs and that she had never officially released an album.

== Personal life ==
Stotskaya was in a relationship with actor Aleksey Sekirin until 2008. In 2011, she married an Armenian businessman with whom she had two children, a son (born in 2011) and a daughter (born in 2017). The pair separated in 2019 and later divorced. During an episode of Secret for a Million, Stotskaya said that she had had a very shortlived affair with Philipp Kirkorov.

In 2002, Stotskaya was almost involved in the Moscow theater hostage crisis as she had initially planned to attend the play Nord-Ost on 23 October 2002, taking leave from her work at Chicago, but changed her mind last minute upon Kirkorov's request.

== Discography ==
=== Singles ===
Title	Year	Peak chart positions	Album
Title	Year	RUS Airplay	Album
"Влюблённая душа" (with Philipp Kirkorov)	2003	16	Non-album singles
"Дай мне пять минут"	2004	12	Non-album singles
"И ты скажешь (radio edit)" (with Philipp Kirkorov	2004	12	Non-album singles
"Я не люблю тебя" (with Nikita)	2004	103	Non-album singles
"Shadows dance all around"	2005	197	Non-album singles
"Круче Мулен Ружей" (with Elena Vorobey and Tatyana Ovsienko)	2005	250	Non-album singles
"If I Had Your Love"	2006	127	Non-album singles
"Прикольная"	2006	31	Non-album singles
"Дай мне (OST "Пророк")" (with Aleksandr Marshal)	2008	121	Non-album singles
"Этими руками"	2008	139	Non-album singles
"Преступник"	2012	236	Non-album singles
"Влюбляться"	2013	73	Non-album singles

== Filmography ==
=== Films ===
- The Crazy Day or The Marriage of Figaro (2003)
- Love in the Big City 2 (2010)

=== TV ===
- One to One!
- The Invisible Man
- Minute of Fame
- Svaty

== Awards and nominations ==
Year	Award	Category	Nominated work	Result
2003	Golden Gramophone Award	Golden Gramophone Statuette	Veny-reki	Nominated
2003	Song of the Year	Laureate of the Festival	Veny-reki	Won
2003	ZD Awards	Solo singer of the year	Anastasia Stotskaya	Nominated
2004	Muz-TV Award	Breakthrough of the Year	Anastasia Stotskaya	Nominated
2004	MTV Russia Music Awards	Best Debut	Anastasia Stotskaya	Nominated
