= Russia in the Eurovision Song Contest 2004 =

- Eurovision Song Contest 2004
- Country: Russia
- Selection process: Internal selection
- Announcement date: Artist: 10 March 2004; Song: 24 March 2004

Competing entry
- Song: "Believe Me"
- Artist: Julia Savicheva
- Songwriters: Maxim Fadeev; Brenda Loring

Placement
- Final result: 11th, 67 points

Participation chronology

Russia was represented at the Eurovision Song Contest 2004 with the song "Believe Me", written by Maxim Fadeev and Brenda Loring, and performed by Julia Savicheva. The Russian entry was selected internally by the Russian broadcaster Channel One Russia (C1R). At the contest, Russia placed 11th and scored 67 points.

== Before Eurovision ==
=== Internal selection ===
On 22 January 2004, C1R announced a submission period for interested artists and composers to submit their entries until 15 February 2004. The broadcaster received over 700 submissions at the conclusion of the deadline, including entries from Anastasia Stotskaya, Avraam Russo, Dima Bilan, Reflex and Smash. A jury panel evaluated the received submissions and selected the Russian entry. The jury consisted of Konstantin Ernst (general manager of C1R), Aleksandr Fifeman (general producer of C1R), Marina Danielyan (service manager of C1R), Yuriy Aksyuta (music director of C1R), Vladimir Matetsky (singer-songwriter and producer) and Valeriya (singer).

On 10 March 2004, C1R announced that they had internally selected Yulia Savicheva to represent Russia in Istanbul, and that a song produced by Maxim Fadeev had also been selected. The Russian song, "Believe Me", was presented to the public on 24 March 2004 through the release of the official music video. "Believe Me" was composed by Maxim Fadeev, with lyrics by Marina Boroditskaya (under the pseudonym Brenda Loring).

==== Participants ====
Internal selection - Known submitted entries
Artist(s)	Song	Songwriter(s)
Anastasia Stotskaya and Philipp Kirkorov	"I ty skazhesh" (И ты скажешь)	Unknown
Andrei Berestenko	"September 11"	Vitaliy Okorokov
Avraam Russo	Unknown	Unknown
Be Good	"Take Me Back to Rio"	Vladimir Gustov, Igor Balakirev
Dima Bilan	Unknown	Unknown
Gorod V	"Doch kapitana" (Дочь капитана)	Unknown
Jam	Unknown	Unknown
Yulia Savicheva	"Believe Me"	Maxim Fadeev, Brenda Loring
Kevin	"You May"	Kevin
Mary X	"Collision"	G. Philippov, Mary X
Reflex	Unknown	Unknown
Smash	"This Could Lead to Something"	Ben "Jammin" Robbins, Nathan King, Simon Tauber
Smash	"Would You Cry for Me"	Ben "Jammin" Robbins, Nathan King, Matthew Sharp, Bea Eden, Lee Curle, Phil Nicholas, Simon Stirling
Verka Serduchka	Unknown	Unknown
Nu Virgos	Unknown	Unknown
Zazhigalka	Unknown	Unknown

== At Eurovision ==
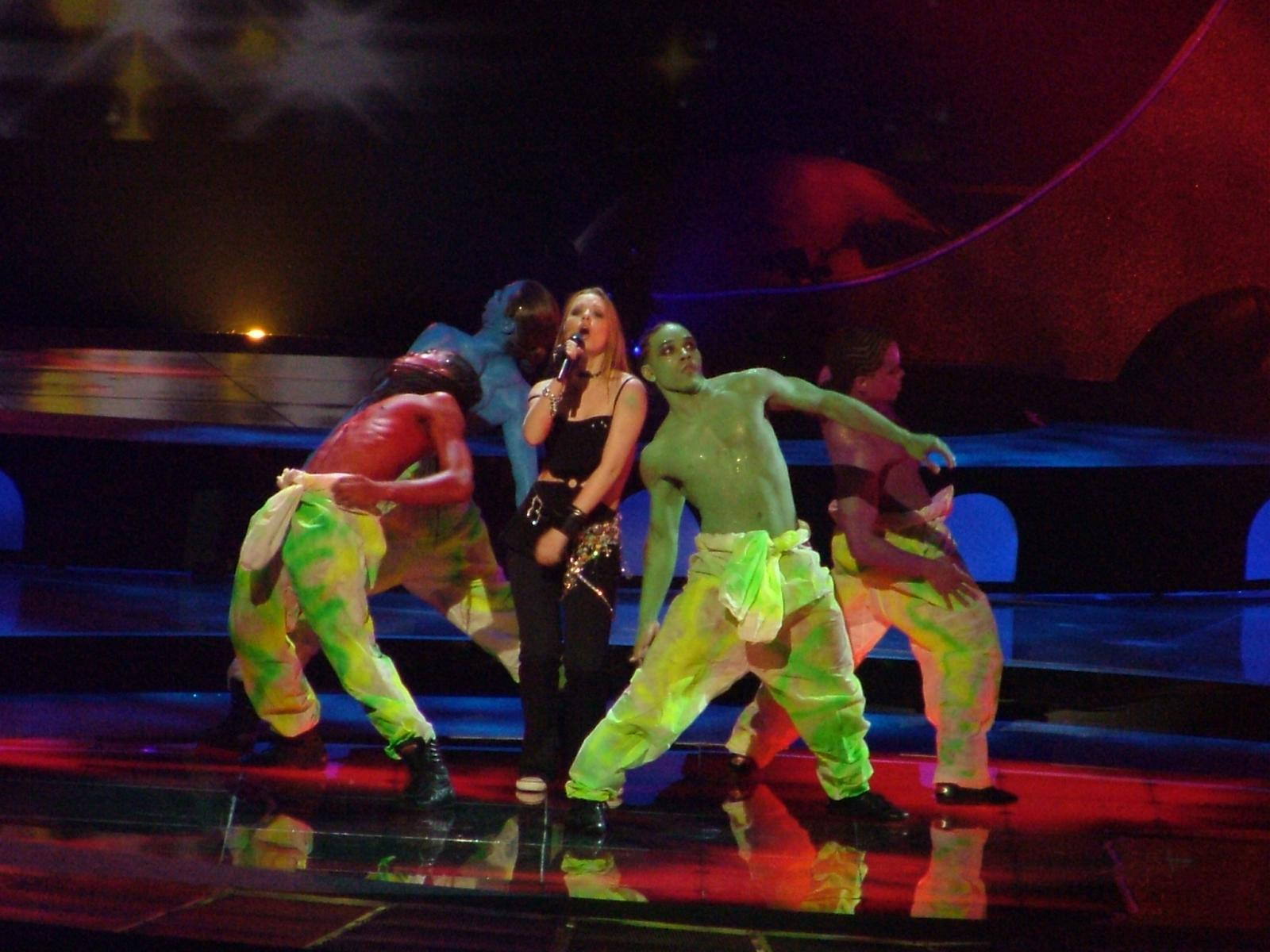
Julia Savicheva at rehearsal in Istanbul.

For the Eurovision Song Contest 2004, a semi-final round was introduced in order to accommodate the influx of nations that wanted to compete in the contest. Since Russia placed 3rd in the previous contest year, Russia automatically qualified to compete in the final along with the Big Four countries and nine other nations that were also successful in the 2003 Contest. 22 semi-finalists competed for 10 spots in the final, joining Russia among the 14 pre-qualified nations. On 23 March 2004, Russia was drawn to perform 14th in the final on 15 May 2004, following Belgium and preceding a slot allotted for a semi-finalist qualifier, which was ultimately filled by Macedonia.

The Russian performance featured Savicheva performing an athletic routine with four male dancers, choreographed by Kamel Ouali. After the voting concluded, Russia scored 67 points and placed 11th. Since Russia was among the top 10 countries, excluding the nations that constitute the Big Four, Russia pre-qualified to compete directly in the final of the 2005 Contest.

=== Voting ===
C1R chose not to broadcast the semi-final of the competition on 12 May 2004 and therefore, Russia was ineligible to participate in the voting. The final was broadcast on Channel One, with commentary by Yuriy Aksyuta and Elena Batinova. The voting spokesperson for Russia was Yana Churikova.

While most of Europe implemented televoting already in 1998, this was the first year Russia managed to implement televoting as well. Following the release of the televoting figures by the EBU after the conclusion of the competition, it was revealed that a total of 96,955 televotes were cast in Russia during the final.

Points awarded to Russia (Final)
Score	Country
12 points	Belarus
10 points	Latvia; Ukraine
8 points	Estonia; Lithuania
7 points	
6 points	Cyprus; Israel
5 points	
4 points	Finland
3 points	
2 points	Greece
1 point	Serbia and Montenegro

Points awarded by Russia (Final)
Score	Country
12 points	Ukraine
10 points	Serbia and Montenegro
8 points	Turkey
7 points	Greece
6 points	Cyprus
5 points	Croatia
4 points	France
3 points	Sweden
2 points	Iceland
1 point	United Kingdom
