= Natalia Podolskaya =

Belarusian and Russian singer (born 1982)

Natalia Podolskaya Наталья Подольская
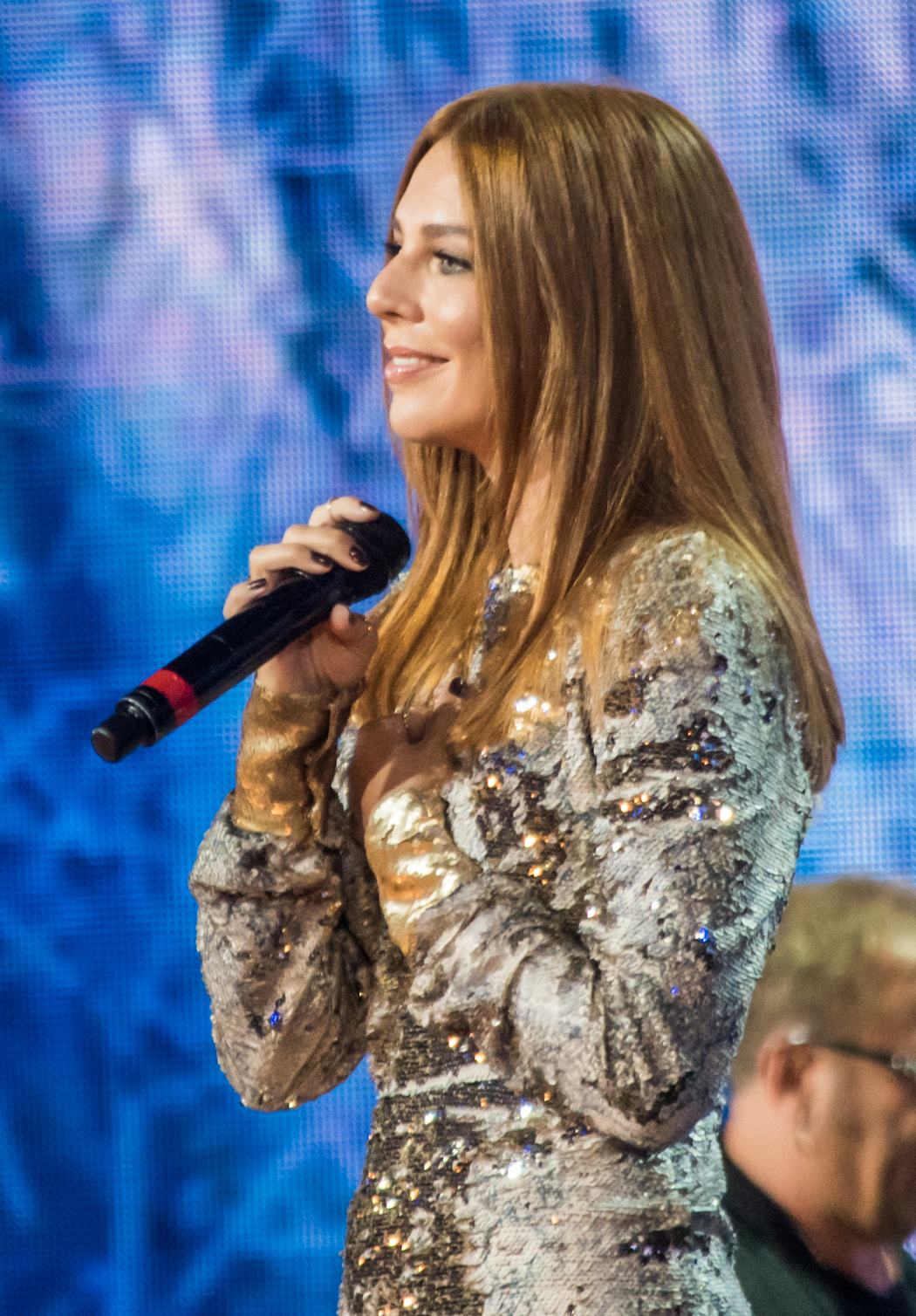
- Podolskaya in 2017

Background information
- Born: 20 May 1982 (age 44); Mogilev, Belarusian SSR, Soviet Union
- Genres: Pop-rock
- Occupation: Singer
- Years active: 2002–present

Natalia Yuryevna Podolskaya (Natalla Padolskaja, Belarusian: Натальля Юр'еўна Падольская, Russian: Наталья Юрьевна Подольская, born 20 May 1982) is a Belarusian and Russian singer who performed for Russia at the 2005 Eurovision Song Contest and was ranked No. 15. In 2008, she became a Russian citizen. In 2015, she won the Golden Gramophone Award.

== Early years ==
Podolskaya was born in 1982 in Mogilev, Belarus. At the age of nine, she studied piano at music school and began singing in the Studio W group of the Mogilev Music and Choreography School, which allowed her to tour Belgium, Germany, and Poland. As a teenager, she won first prize at the Zornaja rostan (Belarus), Mahutny Boza (Belarus), and Goldenfest (Poland) music festivals.

Between 1999 and 2004, she studied law at a private law school and continued to gain experience as a solo performer. Podolskaya took part in music shows on Belarusian radio and television and in 2002/2003, she was a finalist in the national Belarus TV festival On the Crosses of Europe. In 2002, she moved to Moscow and joined the Moscow Institute of Modern Art.

Podolskaya became well known in 2002 after her performance at the Slavianski Bazaar in Vitebsk music festival. The same year in Prague, sixteen members of the Universetalent Prague 2002 International jury marked her performance as very high: Podolskaya won the Best Song and Best Singer categories.

== Solo career ==
=== 2003–2005 ===
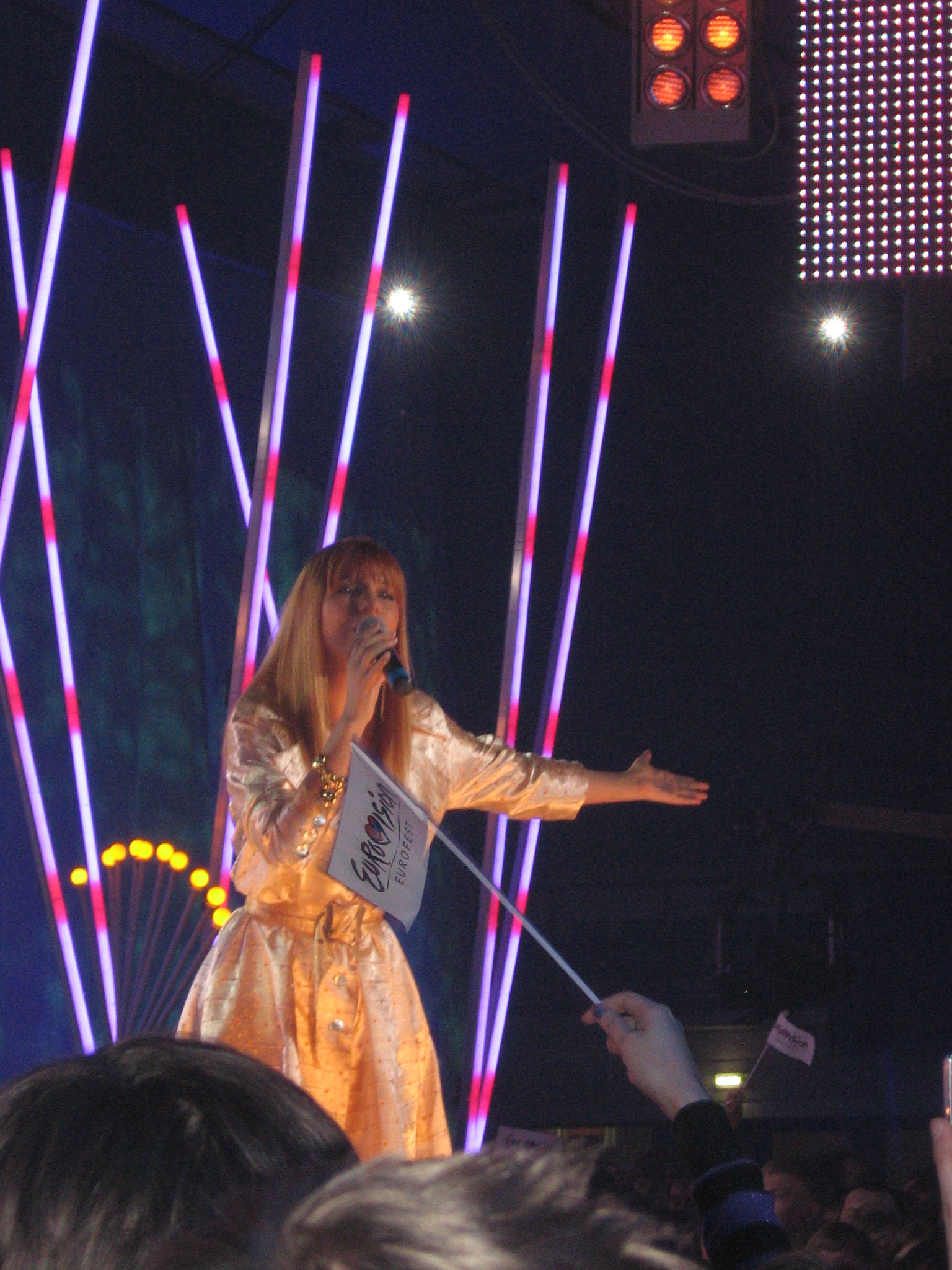
Podolskaya performing in 2008

In early 2003, Rayan Lobsher and Michael Jay wrote the song "Unstoppable" especially for Podolskaya and invited her to take part in the 2004 Eurovision Song Contest as the UK representative. However, Podolskaya was determined to sing only for her home country of Belarus.

In 2004, the singer became a participant in season five of Fabrika Zvyozd, in which she was instructed by some of the best singing, dancing, and acting teachers in Russia. It was here that she met songwriter and producer Victor Drobysh. With his help, she recorded her first album, Pozdno ("Поздно"), which was released in December 2004.

In 2005, Podolskaya was selected to represent Russia with her song "Nobody Hurt No One" in the 2005 Eurovision Song Contest, held in Kyiv, Ukraine.

In March 2020, Podolskaya released the album Cry ("Плачь").

== Discography ==
=== Studio albums ===
- Pozdno (2005)
- Intuicyja (2013)
- Cry (2020)
- Конечно, Да! (2023)

=== Compilations ===
- Sbornik (2013)

Awards and achievements
Preceded by Julia Savicheva with "Believe Me"	Russia in the Eurovision Song Contest; 2005	Succeeded by Dima Bilan with "Never Let You Go"
