= Yerkesh Shakeyev =

Kazak composer and songwriter (born 1965)

Yerkesh Shakeyev Еркеш Шәкеев
- Born: May 5, 1965 (age 61); Ruzayevka, Kokchetav Oblast, Kazakh SSR, Soviet Union
- Genres: Soundtrack; pop; neoclassical
- Occupations: Composer; songwriter; singer
- Instrument: Guitar
- Years active: 1987–present
- Website: yerkesh-shakeyev.com

Yerkesh Kokenuly Shakeyev (Kazakh: Еркеш Көкенұлы Шәкеев, romanized: Erkeş Kökenūly Şäkeev) is a Kazakh composer, lyricist, and songwriter whose work ranged from bard songs and pop hits to neoclassicism. He was born on May 5, 1962, in the village of Ruzaevka, Kokchetav Oblast, into the family of Kokena Shakeev, the People's Akyn of Kazakhstan and the First President of the Akyns Union of Kazakhstan.

Shakeyev has collected international recognition in the music industry. He placed on the 3rd place at the South Pacific International Song Contest in Australia in 1999, holds special awards of the British Academy of Composers and Songwriters (BASCA), won Platinum "Tarlan Prize" and the All-Union television festival "Song of the Year" (Moscow, Russia).

Shakeyev started his professional career in 1987 after winning the Republican contest of young talents called "Zhastar Dausy" (1st place and the audience award). After this, he was invited to work as a singer-songwriter to the ensemble of Aray directed by Taskyn Okapova.

Shakeyev's songs were released in dozens of albums by well-known Kazakhstan and Russian artists, such as A – Studio (in three formulations), Batyrkhan Shukenov, Ani Lorak, Anita Tsoi, the duo Myuzikola, duo of "duo L, group Vostok (East) 'Nagima Eskalieva, group "Rakhat Lukum", Parviz Nazarov, Rahat Turlyhanov, Tolkyn Zabirova, Baurzhan Isayev, Dinara Sultan, Group of 101, and many other stars of the post-Soviet era.
