= Eurovision Song Contest 2005 =

International song competition

- Awakening

Dates and venue
- Semi-final: 19 May 2005
- Final: 21 May 2005
- Venue: Palace of Sports; Kyiv, Ukraine

Organisation
- Organiser: European Broadcasting Union (EBU)
- Executive supervisor: Svante Stockselius

Production
- Host broadcaster: National Television Company of Ukraine (NTU)
- Director: Sven Stojanovic
- Executive producer: Pavlo Grytsak
- Presenters: Maria Efrosinina; Pavlo Shylko

Participants
- Number of entries: 39
- Number of finalists: 24
- Debuting countries: Bulgaria; Moldova
- Returning countries: Hungary
- Participation map: Finalist countries Countries eliminated in the semi-final Countries that participated in the past but not in 2005

Vote
- Voting system: Each country awarded 12, 10, 8–1 points to their 10 favourite songs.
- Winning song: Greece; "My Number One"

The Eurovision Song Contest 2005 was the 50th edition of the Eurovision Song Contest. It consisted of a semi-final on 19 May and a final on 21 May 2005, held at the Palace of Sports in Kyiv, Ukraine, and presented by Maria Efrosinina and Pavlo Shylko. It was organised by the European Broadcasting Union (EBU) and host broadcaster National Television Company of Ukraine (NTU), who staged the event after winning the 2004 contest for Ukraine with the song "Wild Dances" by Ruslana.

Broadcasters from thirty-nine countries participated in the contest, three more than the previous record of thirty-six, that took part the year before. Bulgaria and Moldova made their first participation this year, while Hungary returned to the contest after a six-year absence, having last taken part in 1998.

The winner was Greece with the song "My Number One", performed by Helena Paparizou and written by Manos Psaltakis, Christos Dantis and Natalia Germanou. This was Greece's first victory in the contest after 31 years of participation. Malta, Romania, Israel, and Latvia rounded out the top five. Malta equalled their best result from 2002, while Romania achieved their best result in their Eurovision history. Unusually, all "Big Four" countries (France, Germany, Spain and United Kingdom) ended up as the "Last Four", all placing in the bottom four positions in the final.

== Location ==
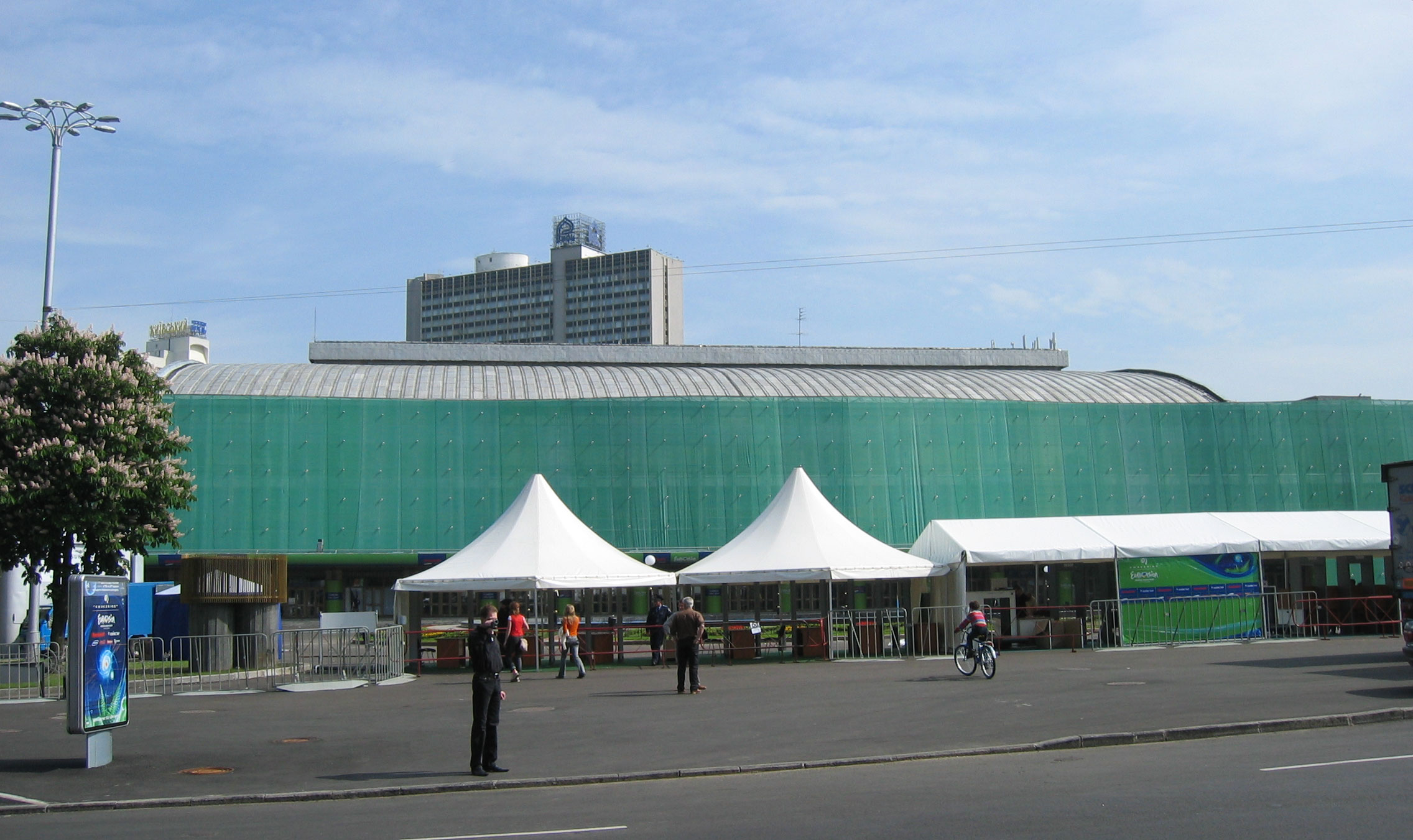
Palace of Sports, Kyiv – host venue pictured during the 2005 contest.

Kyiv is the capital and largest city of Ukraine, located in the north central part of the country on the Dnieper. The Palace of Sports, a multi-purpose indoor arena, was confirmed by officials as the host venue on 6 September 2004. However, in order to host the contest, the facilities had been brought up to the standard required by the European Broadcasting Union (EBU).

At the end of December 2004, work began on the renovation of the hall, for which approximately 4 million francs were allocated. Renovation works were to be finished by 20 April, however, they were completed at the beginning of May. The arena could accommodate over 5,000 seated spectators. Additionally 2,000 press delegates were catered for.

Hotel rooms were scarce as the contest organisers asked the Ukrainian government to put a block on bookings they did not control themselves through official delegation allocations or tour packages: this led to many people's hotel bookings being cancelled.

Organizers hoped that by hosting Eurovision, it would boost Ukraine's image abroad and increase tourism, while the country's new government hoped that it would also give a modest boost to the long-term goal of acquiring European Union membership.

== Participants ==
Eurovision Song Contest 2005 – Participation summaries by country
- Albania; Andorra; Austria; Belarus; Belgium; Bosnia and Herzegovina; Bulgaria; Croatia; Cyprus; Denmark; Estonia; Finland; France; Germany; Greece; Hungary; Iceland; Ireland; Israel; Latvia; ~~Lebanon~~; Lithuania; Macedonia; Malta; Moldova; Monaco; Netherlands; Norway; Poland; Portugal; Romania; Russia; Serbia and Montenegro; Slovenia; Spain; Sweden; Switzerland; Turkey; Ukraine; United Kingdom

Thirty-nine countries participated in the 2005 contest. Hungary returned to the contest after a six-year absence, last competing in 1998. Bulgaria and Moldova competed in the contest for the first time. Czech Republic and Lebanon were originally announced as participants, but the former withdrew before the deadline, and the latter withdrew in March 2005, two months before the contest.

Several of the performing artists had previously represented the same country in past editions: Constantinos Christoforou had represented Cyprus in 1996 as a solo artist and in 2002 as part of One; Helena Paparizou had represented Greece in 2001 as part of Antique; Selma had represented Iceland in 1999; and Chiara had represented Malta in 1998. In addition, Alexandros Panayi providing backing vocals for Greece, had represented Cyprus in 1995 as a solo artist and in 2000 as part of Voice; Anabel Conde providing backing vocals for Andorra, had represented Spain in 1995; and Elina Konstantopoulou providing backing vocals for Cyprus, had represented Greece in 1995.

Eurovision Song Contest 2005 participants
Country	Broadcaster	Artist	Song	Language	Songwriter(s)
Albania	RTSH	Ledina Çelo	"Tomorrow I Go" (Note: On-screen captions used the Albanian title "Nesër shkoj")	English	Adrian Hila; Pandi Laço
Andorra	RTVA	Marian van de Wal	"La mirada interior"	Catalan	Daniel Aragay; Rafael Artesero; Rafael Fernández; Rafah Tanit
Austria	ORF	Global.Kryner	"Y así"	English, Spanish	Edi Köhldorfer; Christof Spörk
Belarus	BTRC	Angelica Agurbash	"Love Me Tonight"	English	Nikos Terzis; Nektarios Tyrakis
Belgium	RTBF	Nuno Resende	"Le Grand Soir"	French	Alec Mansion; Frédéric Zeitoun
Bosnia and Herzegovina	BHRT	Feminnem	"Call Me" (Note: On-screen captions used the Croatian title "Zovi")	English	Andrej Babić
Bulgaria	BNT	Kaffe	"Lorraine"	English	Orlin Pavlov; Vesselin Vesselinov
Croatia	HRT	Boris Novković feat. Lado Members	"Vukovi umiru sami"	Croatian	Boris Novković; Franjo Valentić
Cyprus	CyBC	Constantinos Christoforou	"Ela, ela" (Έλα, έλα)	English	Constantinos Christoforou
Denmark	DR	Jakob Sveistrup	"Talking to You"	English	Jacob Launbjerg; Andreas Mørck
Estonia	ETV	Suntribe	"Let's Get Loud"	English	Sven Lõhmus
Finland	YLE	Geir Rönning	"Why"	English	Steven Stewart; Mika Toivanen
France	France Télévisions	Ortal	"Chacun pense à soi"	French	Marie Ortal Malka; Saad Tabainet
Germany	NDR (Note: On behalf of the German public broadcasting consortium ARD)	Gracia	"Run & Hide"	English	David Brandes; John O'Flynn; Jane Tempest
Greece	ERT	Helena Paparizou	"My Number One"	English	Christos Dantis; Natalia Germanou; Manos Psaltakis
Hungary	MTV	Nox	"Forogj, világ"	Hungarian	Szabolcs Harmath; Attila Valla
Iceland	RÚV	Selma	"If I Had Your Love"	English	Linda Thompson; Þorvaldur Bjarni Þorvaldsson; Vignir Snær Vigfússon
Ireland	RTÉ	Donna and Joe	"Love?"	English	Karl Broderick
Israel	IBA	Shiri Maimon	"HaSheket SheNish'ar" (השקט שנשאר)	Hebrew, English	Pini Aharonbayev; Ben Green; Eyal Shahar
Latvia	LTV	Walters and Kazha	"The War Is Not Over"	English	Mārtiņš Freimanis
Lithuania	LRT	Laura and the Lovers	"Little by Little"	English	William "Billy" Butt; Bobby Ljunggren
Macedonia	MRT	Martin Vučić	"Make My Day"	English	Branka Kostić; Dragan Vučić
Malta	PBS	Chiara	"Angel"	English	Chiara Siracusa
Moldova	TRM	Zdob și Zdub	"Boonika bate doba"	English, Romanian	Mihai Gîncu; Roman Iagupov
Monaco	TMC	Lise Darly	"Tout de moi"	French	Philippe Bosco; Didier Fabre
Netherlands	NOS	Glennis Grace	"My Impossible Dream"	English	Robert D. Fisher; Bruce Smith
Norway	NRK	Wig Wam	"In My Dreams"	English	Trond "Teeny" Holter
Poland	TVP	Ivan and Delfin	"Czarna dziewczyna"	Polish, Russian	Ivan Komarenko; Łukasz Lazer; Michał Szymański
Portugal	RTP	2B	"Amar"	Portuguese, English	Alexandre Honrado; Ernesto Leite; José da Ponte
Romania	TVR	Luminița Anghel and Sistem	"Let Me Try"	English	Cristian Faur
Russia	C1R	Natalia Podolskaya	"Nobody Hurt No One"	English	Mary Susan Applegate; Viktor Drobysh; Jussi-Pekka Järvinen
Serbia and Montenegro	UJRT	No Name	"Zauvijek moja" (Заувијек моја)	Serbian	Slaven Knezović; Milan Perić
Slovenia	RTVSLO	Omar Naber	"Stop"	Slovene	Omar Naber; Urša Vlašič
Spain	TVE	Son de Sol	"Brujería"	Spanish	Alfredo Panebianco
Sweden	SVT	Martin Stenmarck	"Las Vegas"	English	Niklas Edberger; Johan Fransson; Tim Larsson; Tobias Lundgren
Switzerland	SRG SSR	Vanilla Ninja	"Cool Vibes"	English	David Brandes; John O'Flynn; Jane Tempest
Turkey	TRT	Gülseren	"Rimi Rimi Ley"	Turkish	Göksan Arman; Erdinç Tunç
Ukraine	NTU	GreenJolly	"Razom nas bahato" (Разом нас багато)	Ukrainian, English	GreenJolly
United Kingdom	BBC	Javine	"Touch My Fire"	English	Javine Hylton; John Themis

=== Other countries ===
==== Active EBU members ====
Czech broadcaster Czech Television initially applied to participate in the 2005 contest; however, it reconsidered débuting in the contest and later withdrew its application. Lebanese broadcaster Télé Liban initially confirmed its début in the contest and selected the song "Quand tout s'enfuit" performed by Aline Lahoud as its entry; however, the broadcaster announced its withdrawal from the competition in March 2005 after finding out the obligation to broadcast all participating entries, including the Israeli one, as well as enabling its viewers to vote for them; this contravened a Lebanese law prohibiting any acknowledgement of Israel.

== Format ==
=== Visual design ===
The official logo of the contest remained the same from the 2004 contest with the country's flag in the heart being changed. Following Istanbul's 'Under the Same Sky', the slogan for the 2005 show was 'Awakening', which symbolised the awakening of the country and city ready to present itself to Europe. The postcards (short clips shown between performances) for the 2005 show illustrated Ukraine's culture and heritage along with a more modern and industrial side to the country.

This was the first edition to be broadcast in widescreen 16:9 format.

=== Presenters ===
The hosts of the Eurovision Song Contest in Kyiv were television presenter Maria "Masha" Efrosinina and DJ Pavlo "Pasha" Shylko. Previous winner Ruslana returned to the stage in Kyiv to perform in the interval act and to interview the contestants backstage in the 'green room'. Ruslana was also intended to be a presenter for the show, but was pulled out before the contest for numerous reasons, including her poor English skills. The Ukrainian boxers Vitali and Wladimir Klitschko opened the televoting, while a special trophy was presented to the winner by Ukraine's president, Viktor Yushchenko.

=== Publicity ===
An official CD and DVD was released and a new introduction was an official pin set, which contains heart-shaped pins with the flags of all thirty-nine participating countries. The EBU also commissioned a book "The Eurovision Song Contest – The Official History" by British/American author John Kennedy O'Connor to celebrate the contest's fiftieth anniversary. The book was presented on screen during the break between songs 12 and 13 (Serbia and Montenegro, Denmark). The book was published in English, German, French, Dutch, Swedish, Danish and Finnish.

== Contest overview ==
=== Semi-final ===
Countries participating in the semi-final The top ten of the 2004 contest, who automatically qualify. The "Big Four" countries, who automatically qualify.

The semi-final was held on 19 May 2005 at 22:00 EEST (21:00 CEST). 25 countries performed but all 39 participants voted.

Qualifiers

Results of the semi-final of the Eurovision Song Contest 2005
R/O	Country	Artist	Song	Points	Place
1	Austria	Global.Kryner	"Y así"	30	21
2	Lithuania	Laura and the Lovers	"Little by Little"	17	25
3	Portugal	2B	"Amar"	51	17
4	Moldova	Zdob și Zdub	"Boonika bate doba"	207	2
5	Latvia	Walters and Kazha	"The War Is Not Over"	85	10
6	Monaco	Lise Darly	"Tout de moi"	22	24
7	Israel	Shiri Maimon	"HaSheket SheNish'ar"	158	7
8	Belarus	Angelica Agurbash	"Love Me Tonight"	67	13
9	Netherlands	Glennis Grace	"My Impossible Dream"	53	14
10	Iceland	Selma	"If I Had Your Love"	52	16
11	Belgium	Nuno Resende	"Le Grand Soir"	29	22
12	Estonia	Suntribe	"Let's Get Loud"	31	20
13	Norway	Wig Wam	"In My Dreams"	164	6
14	Romania	Luminița Anghel and Sistem	"Let Me Try"	235	1
15	Hungary	Nox	"Forogj, világ"	167	5
16	Finland	Geir Rönning	"Why"	50	18
17	Macedonia	Martin Vučić	"Make My Day"	97	9
18	Andorra	Marian van de Wal	"La mirada interior"	27	23
19	Switzerland	Vanilla Ninja	"Cool Vibes"	114	8
20	Croatia	Boris Novković feat. Lado members	"Vukovi umiru sami"	169	4
21	Bulgaria	Kaffe	"Lorraine"	49	19
22	Ireland	Donna and Joe	"Love?"	53	14
23	Slovenia	Omar Naber	"Stop"	69	12
24	Denmark	Jakob Sveistrup	"Talking to You"	185	3
25	Poland	Ivan and Delfin	"Czarna dziewczyna"	81	11

=== Final ===
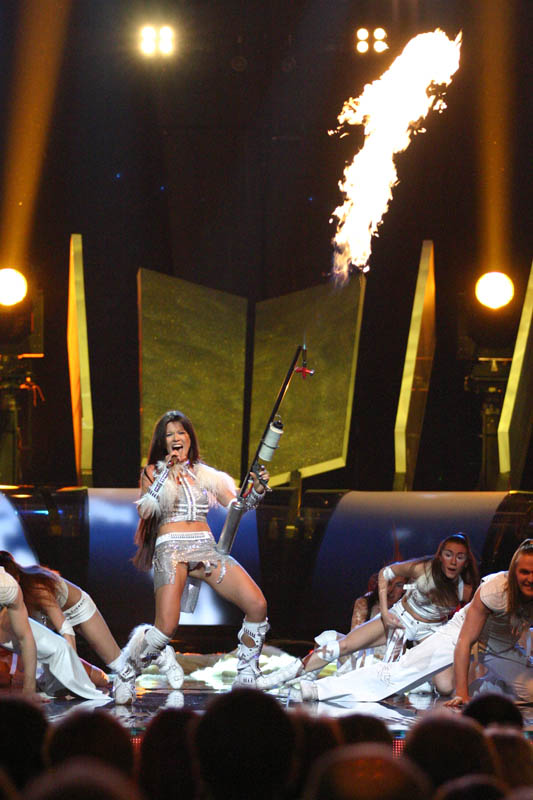
Ruslana performing at the opening of the final

The finalists were:

- the four automatic qualifiers France, Germany, Spain, and the United Kingdom;
- the top 10 countries from the 2004 final (other than the automatic qualifiers);
- the top 10 countries from the 2005 semi-final.

The final was held on 21 May 2005 at 22:00 EEST (21:00 CEST) and was won by Greece. 24 countries performed and all 39 participants voted.

Winner

Results of the final of the Eurovision Song Contest 2005
R/O	Country	Artist	Song	Points	Place
1	Hungary	Nox	"Forogj, világ"	97	12
2	United Kingdom	Javine	"Touch My Fire"	18	22
3	Malta	Chiara	"Angel"	192	2
4	Romania	Luminița Anghel and Sistem	"Let Me Try"	158	3
5	Norway	Wig Wam	"In My Dreams"	125	9
6	Turkey	Gülseren	"Rimi Rimi Ley"	92	13
7	Moldova	Zdob și Zdub	"Boonika bate doba"	148	6
8	Albania	Ledina Çelo	"Tomorrow I Go"	53	16
9	Cyprus	Constantinos Christoforou	"Ela Ela"	46	18
10	Spain	Son de Sol	"Brujería"	28	21
11	Israel	Shiri Maimon	"HaSheket SheNish'ar"	154	4
12	Serbia and Montenegro	No Name	"Zauvijek moja"	137	7
13	Denmark	Jakob Sveistrup	"Talking to You"	125	9
14	Sweden	Martin Stenmarck	"Las Vegas"	30	19
15	Macedonia	Martin Vučić	"Make My Day"	52	17
16	Ukraine	GreenJolly	"Razom nas bahato"	30	19
17	Germany	Gracia	"Run & Hide"	4	24
18	Croatia	Boris Novković feat. Lado members	"Vukovi umiru sami"	115	11
19	Greece	Helena Paparizou	"My Number One"	230	1
20	Russia	Natalia Podolskaya	"Nobody Hurt No One"	57	15
21	Bosnia and Herzegovina	Feminnem	"Call Me"	79	14
22	Switzerland	Vanilla Ninja	"Cool Vibes"	128	8
23	Latvia	Walters and Kazha	"The War Is Not Over"	153	5
24	France	Ortal	"Chacun pense à soi"	11	23

==== Spokespersons ====
Each participating broadcaster appointed a spokesperson who was responsible for announcing, in English or French, the votes for its respective country. The order in which each country announced their votes was compiled by placing the countries that failed to qualify from the semi-final first in the running order they performed during the semi-final, followed by the finalists which voted in the order they performed in during the final. The spokespersons are shown alongside each country.

1. Austria – Dodo Roscic
2. Lithuania – Rolandas Vilkončius
3. Portugal – Isabel Angelino
4. Monaco – Anne Allegrini
5. Belarus – Elena Ponomareva
6. Netherlands – Nancy Coolen
7. Iceland – Ragnhildur Steinunn Jónsdóttir
8. Belgium – Armelle Gysen
9. Estonia – Maarja-Liis Ilus
10. Finland – Jari Sillanpää
11. Andorra – Ruth Gumbau
12. Bulgaria – Evgeniya Atanasova
13. Ireland – Dana
14. Slovenia – Katarina Čas
15. Poland – Maciej Orłoś
16. Hungary – Zsuzsa Demcsák
17. United Kingdom – Cheryl Baker
18. Malta – Valerie Vella
19. Romania – Berti Barbera
20. Norway – Ingvild Helljesen
21. Turkey – Meltem Ersan Yazgan
22. Moldova – Elena Camerzan
23. Albania – Zhani Ciko
24. Cyprus – Melani Steliou
25. Spain – Ainhoa Arbizu
26. Israel – Dana Herman
27. Serbia and Montenegro – Nina Radulović
28. Denmark – Gry Johansen
29. Sweden – Annika Jankell
30. Macedonia – Karolina Gočeva
31. Ukraine – Maria Orlova
32. Germany – Thomas Hermanns
33. Croatia – Barbara Kolar
34. Greece – Alexis Kostalas
35. Russia – Yana Churikova
36. Bosnia and Herzegovina – Ana Mirjana Račanović
37. Switzerland – Cécile Bähler
38. Latvia – Marija Naumova
39. France – Marie Myriam

== Detailed voting results ==
The EBU introduced an undisclosed threshold number of televotes that would have to be registered in each voting country in order to make that country's votes valid. If that number was not reached, the country's backup jury would vote instead. This affected Albania, Andorra and Monaco in the semi-final, and Andorra, Moldova and Monaco in the final.

=== Semi-final ===
Detailed voting results of the semi-final
Voting procedure used: 100% televoting 100% jury vote		Total score	Austria	Lithuania	Portugal	Moldova	Latvia	Monaco	Israel	Belarus	Netherlands	Iceland	Belgium	Estonia	Norway	Romania	Hungary	Finland	Macedonia	Andorra	Switzerland	Croatia	Bulgaria	Ireland	Slovenia	Denmark	Poland	United Kingdom	Malta	Turkey	Albania	Cyprus	Spain	Serbia and Montenegro	Sweden	Ukraine	Germany	Greece	Russia	Bosnia and Herzegovina	France
Contestants	Austria	30																		7	6				10						5						1	1			
Contestants	Lithuania	17					8																	5				4													
Contestants	Portugal	51											10								12												5				12				12
Contestants	Moldova	207	8	10	8		10		10	10		8	4	5	1	12	6	3	10			4	6	3	7		6	5		12	3	8	1	6		12		6	12	6	5
Contestants	Latvia	85		12	4				6	7		2		10	3							7		6	6	5			12			2				2			1		
Contestants	Monaco	22				2														10																					10
Contestants	Israel	158		2	6	5		12		12	10		3			8	5	1	1	12	3		4	7		4	4	6	6	6	7	3	4	3		5	3		8		8
Contestants	Belarus	67		3			3	1	2										6				12				1		7	3		7				4		8	10		
Contestants	Netherlands	53						8	5				12			1				5	2			4		6		2	8												
Contestants	Iceland	52				10			4						8					6						10		3					2		7						2
Contestants	Belgium	29			12	3					6																				1										7
Contestants	Estonia	31		5		1	12										1	6						1	2	3															
Contestants	Norway	164	2	6	1	8	6		7	5	2	12	2	6		7		12	2		5		2	10	3	12	7	7	3	2	2	4		4	8	6		4		7	
Contestants	Romania	235	10		10	12		7	12	3	8	5	8	1	7		12	4	5	4	4	1	5	8	1	7	8	8	10	7		12	12	5	5	1	7	12	3	5	6
Contestants	Hungary	167	7		7		5		8	4		7	6	4	6	10		5	4	1	1	8	7		4	1	12	1	2	8		6	3	8	3	10		5	7	3	4
Contestants	Finland	50						6			1			8	10					3						8									10		4				
Contestants	Macedonia	97	4					3			3					4					8	12	10		8					10	12			10	1		2			10	
Contestants	Andorra	27				4					7																				6		10								
Contestants	Switzerland	114	1	8	2		7	2	3	8		6		12	2	2	3	10	3			3	3	2	5	2	5		1			5		2	4		6	3	2	2	
Contestants	Croatia	169	12	4	3	6	4	5		1	4	4	1	3	4	6	8	2	12		10		8		12		3				10			12	6	7	10			12	
Contestants	Bulgaria	49				7													8											5	4	10	6	1				7		1	
Contestants	Ireland	53												2		5	10			2		5	1				2	12	5	4		1								4	
Contestants	Slovenia	69	3					4	1	2		1					2	7	7			10									8			7		3			6	8	
Contestants	Denmark	185	6	7	5		2	10			12	10	7	7	12	3	7	8		8	7	6		12			10	10	4				8		12		5	2	4		1
Contestants	Poland	81	5	1			1			6	5	3	5		5		4					2								1			7		2	8	8	10	5		3

==== 12 points ====
Below is a summary of all 12 points in the semi-final:

N.	Contestant	Nation(s) giving 12 points
6	Romania	Cyprus, Greece, Hungary, Israel, Moldova, Spain
5	Croatia	Austria, Bosnia and Herzegovina, Macedonia, Serbia and Montenegro, Slovenia
4	Denmark	Ireland, Netherlands, Norway, Sweden
4	Moldova	Romania, Russia, Turkey, Ukraine
3	Israel	Andorra, Belarus, Monaco
3	Norway	Denmark, Finland, Iceland
3	Portugal	France, Germany, Switzerland
2	Latvia	Lithuania, Malta
2	Macedonia	Albania, Croatia
1	Belarus	Bulgaria
1	Belgium	Portugal
1	Estonia	Latvia
1	Hungary	Poland
1	Ireland	United Kingdom
1	Netherlands	Belgium
1	Switzerland	Estonia

=== Final ===
Detailed voting results of the final
Voting procedure used: 100% televoting 100% jury vote		Total score	Austria	Lithuania	Portugal	Monaco	Belarus	Netherlands	Iceland	Belgium	Estonia	Finland	Andorra	Bulgaria	Ireland	Slovenia	Poland	Hungary	United Kingdom	Malta	Romania	Norway	Turkey	Moldova	Albania	Cyprus	Spain	Israel	Serbia and Montenegro	Denmark	Sweden	Macedonia	Ukraine	Germany	Croatia	Greece	Russia	Bosnia and Herzegovina	Switzerland	Latvia	France
Contestants	Hungary	97			2		2		6	2	3		6	5			10				8		6			7	5	8	6			1	2		6	2	3	1		3	3
Contestants	United Kingdom	18													8					4			1			5															
Contestants	Malta	192	5	2		5	5	5	4	8	4	8			10	1		5	10		2	10	8		4	6	7	10		10	6		10	8	4	8	12		3	5	7
Contestants	Romania	158	6		12	4	1	3	5	7			7	8	5		7	10		7		6	4	7	5	8	12	12	3	3	2	2				5		2			5
Contestants	Norway	125		5			4	1	12	3	8	12	2	1	4	4	8		5	5				3		3	3	1	2	12	8		6			4		3		6	
Contestants	Turkey	92	7					12		10				3					1		3				8					8		4		10				8	6		12
Contestants	Moldova	148	2	10	10		7		8	1	6			6		3	3	4	2	2	12		7			2	4	4	5			5	12	1	1	7	10	4		8	2
Contestants	Albania	53	3																				2						8			12			2	10		5	10		1
Contestants	Cyprus	46												10					3	12	1				7				1							12					
Contestants	Spain	28			8								12																										4		4
Contestants	Israel	154	1	3	5	12	8	7		6	1	5	8		6			8	7	8	7	5	3	6	3		6			5	1		7	5			8		1	2	10
Contestants	Serbia and Montenegro	137	12			6	3	4						4		10		2			6			1	6	10					4	10	3	3	12	6	6	10	12	1	6
Contestants	Denmark	125		4	1	10		8	10	4	5	2	3		7		5	6	8	3	4	12					10	3			10			6						4	
Contestants	Sweden	30				3						6										1		5			2			7		6									
Contestants	Macedonia	52				1								7		5							5		10				7						8			7	2		
Contestants	Ukraine	30			7												12							8			1										2				
Contestants	Germany	4				2																		2																	
Contestants	Croatia	115	8	6		7		2	1		2	1		2		12	2	7			5	2			2				10			8	8	2			1	12	8	7	
Contestants	Greece	230	4	1	3			10	2	12		3	4	12	2	2	1	12	12	6	10	4	12	4	12	12	8	7	12	2	12	7		12	5		4	6	7		8
Contestants	Russia	57		7			12				7	7												10									4							10	
Contestants	Bosnia and Herzegovina	79	10					6							1	8			4			7	10						4	4	7	3			10				5		
Contestants	Switzerland	128		8	4	8	10		7		12	10	1		3	6	6	3		1		3				4		2		1	5		5	4	3	3	7			12	
Contestants	Latvia	153		12	6		6		3	5	10	4	10		12	7	4	1	6	10		8		12		1		6		6	3		1	7	7	1	5				
Contestants	France	11											5												1			5													

==== 12 points ====
Points given to Greece.

Below is a summary of all 12 points in the final:

N.	Contestant	Nation(s) giving 12 points
10	Greece	Albania, Belgium, Bulgaria, Cyprus, Germany, Hungary, Serbia and Montenegro, Sweden, Turkey, United Kingdom
3	Latvia	Ireland, Lithuania, Moldova
3	Norway	Denmark, Finland, Iceland
3	Romania	Israel, Spain, Portugal
3	Serbia and Montenegro	Austria, Croatia, Switzerland
2	Croatia	Bosnia and Herzegovina, Slovenia
2	Cyprus	Greece, Malta
2	Moldova	Romania, Ukraine
2	Switzerland	Estonia, Latvia
2	Turkey	France, Netherlands
1	Albania	Macedonia
1	Denmark	Norway
1	Israel	Monaco
1	Malta	Russia
1	Russia	Belarus
1	Spain	Andorra
1	Ukraine	Poland

== Broadcasts ==
Known details on the broadcasts in each country, including the specific broadcasting stations and commentators, are shown in the tables below.

Broadcasters and commentators in participating countries
Country	Broadcaster	Channel(s)	Show(s)	Commentator(s)	Ref(s)
Andorra	RTVA	ATV	All shows	Meri Picart and Josep Lluís Trabal	
Austria	ORF	ORF 1	All shows	Andi Knoll	
Belarus	BTRC	Belarus-1	All shows	Ales Kruglyakov	
Belgium	RTBF	La Une, RTBF Sat	All shows	Jean-Pierre Hautier	
Belgium	RTBF	La Une, RTBF Sat	Semi-final	Jean-Louis Lahaye	
Belgium	VRT	Eén	All shows	André Vermeulen and Anja Daems	
Croatia	HRT	HRT 2	Semi-final	Duško Ćurlić	
Croatia	HRT	HRT 1	Final	Duško Ćurlić	
Denmark	DR	DR1	All shows	Jørgen de Mylius	
Estonia	ETV		All shows	Marko Reikop	
Estonia	ER	Raadio 2	All shows	Mart Juur and Andrus Kivirähk	
Finland	YLE	YLE TV2	All shows	Jaana Pelkonen and Heikki Paasonen	
Finland	YLE	YLE TV2	Final	Asko Murtomäki	
Finland	YLE	YLE FST, YLE Radio Vega	All shows	Thomas Lundin and Hans Johansson	
Finland	YLE	YLE Radio Suomi	All shows	Sanna Kojo and Jorma Hietamäki	
France	France Télévisions	France 4 (Note: Delayed repeat broadcast on France 3 on 21 May at 01:20 (CEST))	Semi-final		
France	France Télévisions	France 3	Final	Julien Lepers and Guy Carlier	
Germany	ARD	NDR Fernsehen	Semi-final	Peter Urban	
Germany	ARD	Das Erste	Final	Peter Urban	
Greece	ERT	NET	All shows	Alexandra Pascalidou	
Hungary	MTV	m1	All shows	Zsuzsa Demcsák, András Fáber and Dávid Szántó	
Iceland	RÚV	Sjónvarpið, Rás 2	All shows	Gísli Marteinn Baldursson	
Ireland	RTÉ	RTÉ Two	Semi-final	Marty Whelan	
Ireland	RTÉ	RTÉ One	Final	Marty Whelan	
Latvia	LTV		All shows	Kārlis Streips	
Lithuania	LRT		All shows	Darius Užkuraitis	
Malta	PBS	TVM	All shows		
Monaco	TMC Monte Carlo		All shows	Bernard Montiel and Genie Godula	
Netherlands	NOS	Nederland 2	All shows	Willem van Beusekom and Cornald Maas	
Netherlands	Radio 2		All shows	Hijlco Span and Ron Stoeltie	
Norway	NRK	NRK1	All shows	Jostein Pedersen	
Norway	NRK	NRK P1	All shows		
Poland	TVP	TVP1	All shows	Artur Orzech	
Portugal	RTP	RTP1	All shows	Eládio Clímaco	
Romania	TVR	TVR 1	All shows		
Russia	Channel One (Note: Also broadcast deferred via the Orbita satellite broadcasting system in the Russian Far East)		All shows	Yuriy Aksyuta and Yelena Batinova	
Serbia and Montenegro	RTS	RTS 1	All shows		
Serbia and Montenegro	RTCG	TVCG 1	All shows		
Slovenia	RTVSLO	SLO 2	Semi-final	Mojca Mavec	
Slovenia	RTVSLO	SLO 1	Final	Mojca Mavec	
Slovenia	RTVSLO	Radio Val 202	All shows	Jernej Vene	
Spain	TVE	La 2	Semi-final	Beatriz Pécker, Ainhoa Arbizu and Carlos Cerezo	
Spain	TVE	La Primera	Final	Beatriz Pécker	
Sweden	SVT	SVT1	All shows	Pekka Heino	
Sweden	SR	SR P4	All shows	Björn Kjellman and Carolina Norén	
Switzerland	SRG SSR	SF 2	Semi-final	Sandra Studer	
Switzerland	SRG SSR	SF 1	Final	Sandra Studer	
Switzerland	SRG SSR	TSR 2	Semi-final	Jean-Marc Richard and Marie-Thérèse Porchet	
Switzerland	SRG SSR	TSR 1	Final	Jean-Marc Richard and Marie-Thérèse Porchet	
Switzerland	SRG SSR	TSI 2	Semi-final	Daniela Tami and Claudio Lazzarino	
Switzerland	SRG SSR	TSI 1	Final	Daniela Tami and Claudio Lazzarino	
Turkey	TRT	TRT 1	All shows		
Ukraine	NTU	Pershyi Natsionalnyi	All shows	Yaroslav Chornenkyi	
Ukraine	UR		All shows	Galyna Babiy	
United Kingdom	BBC	BBC Three	Semi-final	Paddy O'Connell	
United Kingdom	BBC	BBC One, BBC Prime	Final	Terry Wogan	
United Kingdom	BBC	BBC Radio 2	Final	Ken Bruce	

Broadcasters and commentators in non-participating countries
Country	Broadcaster	Channel(s)	Show(s)	Commentator(s)	Ref(s)
Australia	SBS	SBS TV (Note: Deferred broadcast on 20 May (semi-final) and 22 May (final) at 19:30 (AEST))	Semi-final	Paddy O'Connell	
Australia	SBS	SBS TV	Final	Terry Wogan	
Falkland Islands	BFBS	BFBS 1 (Note: Deferred broadcast at 21:00 (FKT))	Final		

== Other awards ==
In addition to the main winner's trophy, the Marcel Bezençon Awards and the Barbara Dex Award were contested during the 2005 Eurovision Song Contest.

=== Marcel Bezençon Awards ===
The Marcel Bezençon Awards, organised since 2002 by Sweden's then-Head of Delegation and 1992 representative Christer Björkman, and 1984 winner Richard Herrey, honours songs in the contest's final. The awards are divided into three categories: Artistic Award which was voted by previous winners of the contest, Composer Award and Press Award.

Category	Country	Song	Artist	Songwriter(s)
Artistic Award	Greece	"My Number One"	Helena Paparizou	Manos Psaltakis; Christos Dantis; Natalia Germanou
Composer Award	Serbia and Montenegro	"Zauvijek moja"	No Name	Slaven Knezović; Milan Perić
Press Award	Malta	"Angel"	Chiara	Chiara Siracusa

=== Barbara Dex Award ===
The Barbara Dex Award is a humorous fan award given to the worst dressed artist each year. Named after Barbara Dex who came last for Belgium in 1993, wearing her self-designed dress, the award was handed by the fansite House of Eurovision from 1997 to 2016 and is being carried out by the fansite songfestival.be since 2017.

Place	Country	Artist	Votes
1	Macedonia	Martin Vučić	42
2	Iceland	Selma	39
3	Portugal	2B	34
4	Norway	Wig Wam	29
5	Belarus	Angelica Agurbash	21

== Official album ==
Cover art of the official album

Eurovision Song Contest: Kyiv 2005 was the official compilation album of the 2005 contest, put together by the European Broadcasting Union and released by EMI Records and CMC International on 2 May 2005. The album featured all 39 songs that entered in the 2005 contest, including the semi-finalists that failed to qualify into the grand final.

The original cover designed for the album was changed after Lebanon's withdrawal from the Eurovision Song Contest 2005 after announcing they would show advertisements over the Israeli entry. Had they entered, they would have been on track 4, disc 2 with the song "Quand tout s'enfuit" by Aline Lahoud.

It was reported that sales of the 2005 Eurovision merchandise reached record-breaking levels.

=== Charts ===
Chart (2005)	Peak position
German Compilation Albums (Offizielle Top 100)	2
