= Özoğuz =

Özoğuz is a Turkish surname. Notable people with the surname include:

- Aydan Özoğuz (born 1967), German politician of Turkish descent
- Gökhan Özoğuz (born 1976), Turkish musician
- Hakan Özoğuz (born 1976), Turkish musician
