= Turkey in the Eurovision Song Contest 2004 =

- Eurovision Song Contest 2004
- Participating broadcaster: Türkiye Radyo ve Televizyon Kurumu (TRT)
- Country: Turkey
- Selection process: Artist: Internal selection Song: 26. Eurovision Şarkı Yarışması Türkiye Finali
- Selection date: Artist: 2 September 2003; Song: 24 January 2004

Competing entry
- Song: "For Real"
- Artist: Athena
- Songwriters: Gökhan Özoğuz; Hakan Özoğuz

Placement
- Final result: 4th, 195 points

Participation chronology

Turkey was represented at the Eurovision Song Contest 2004 with the song "For Real", written by Gökhan Özoğuz and Hakan Özoğuz, and performed by the band Athena. The Turkish participating broadcaster, Türkiye Radyo ve Televizyon Kurumu (TRT), selected its entry through a national final, after having previously selected the performers internally. In addition, TRT was also the host broadcaster and staged the event at the Abdi İpekçi Arena in Istanbul, after winning the previous edition with the song "Everyway That I Can" performed by Sertab Erener.

TRT announced Athena as its representative on 2 September 2003, while their song was selected through the national final 26. Eurovision Şarkı Yarışması Türkiye Finali. Three songs were presented to the public between 21 and 24 January 2004 and the winning song, "For Real", was selected entirely by a public televote and announced on 24 January during the TRT 1 show Sayısal Gece.

As the host country, Turkey qualified to compete directly in the final of the Eurovision Song Contest. Performing in position 22 during the final, Turkey placed fourth out of the 24 participating countries with 195 points.

== Background ==
Prior to the 2004 contest, Türkiye Radyo ve Televizyon Kurumu (TRT) had participated in the Eurovision Song Contest representing Turkey 25 times since its first entry in 1975. It missed the 1979 contest because Arab countries pressured the Turkish government to withdraw from the contest because of the dispute over the Status of Jerusalem, and 1994 contest due to a poor average score from the preceding contests, which ultimately led to relegation. It had won the contest once: in 2003 with the song "Everyway That I Can" performed by Sertab Erener. Its least successful result was in 1987 when it placed 22nd (last) with the song "Şarkım Sevgi Üstüne" by Seyyal Taner and Lokomotif, receiving 0 points in total.

As part of its duties as participating broadcaster, TRT organises the selection of its entry in the Eurovision Song Contest and broadcasts the event in the country. It has used various methods to select its entry in the past, such as internal selections and televised national finals. In order to select its entry at the 2004 contest, the broadcaster opted to organise a national final to select the song for an internally selected artist.

== Before Eurovision ==
=== Artist selection ===
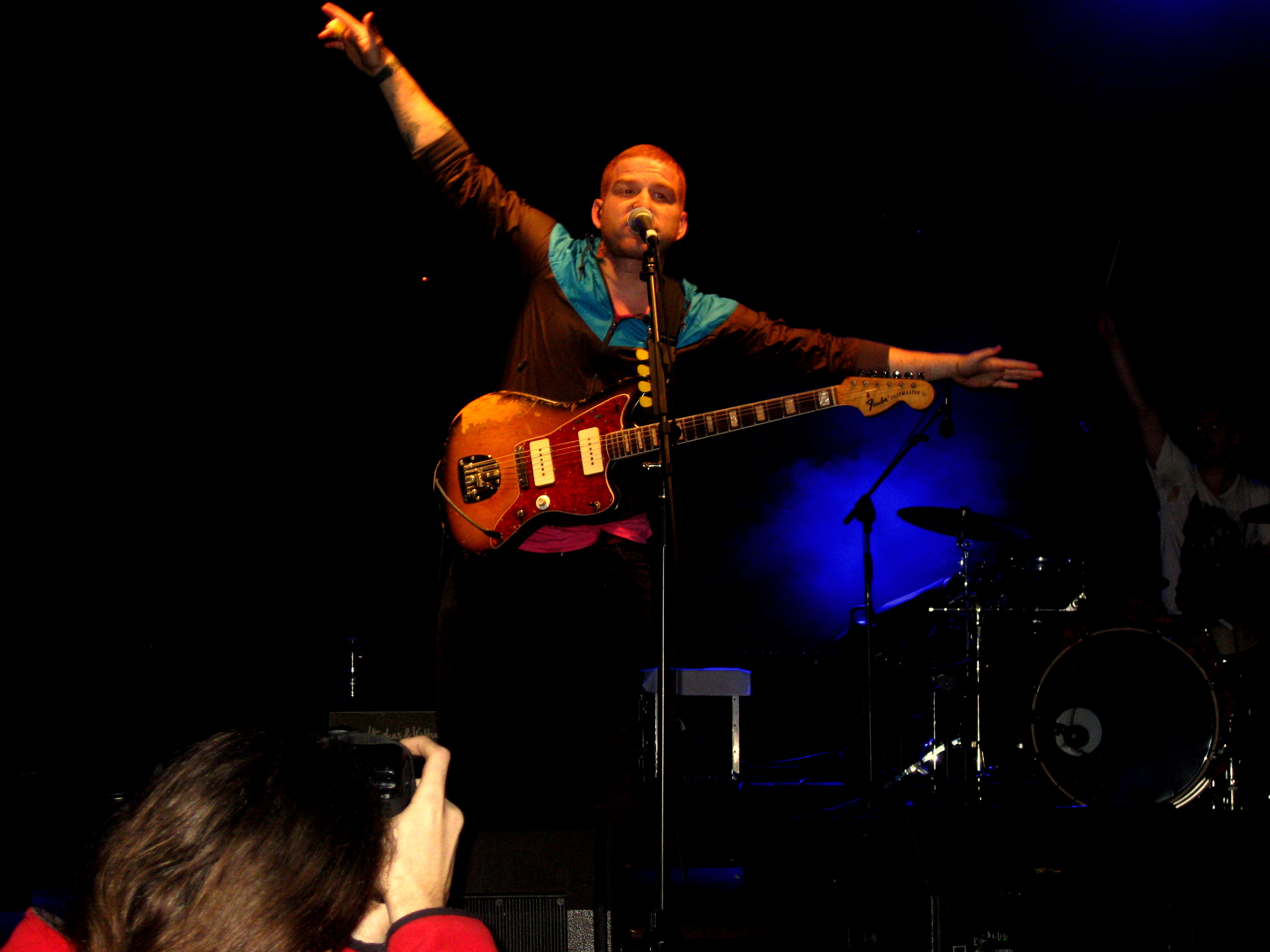
Gökhan Özoğuz (pictured in 2012), lead singer of the band Athena which represented Turkey in the Eurovision Song Contest 2004

On 2 September 2003, TRT announced that they had internally selected the band Athena to represent Turkey in Istanbul. It was also announced that a national final would be held to select the song they would perform at the contest.

=== 26. Eurovision Şarkı Yarışması Türkiye Finali ===
Three songs, all written by members of Athena Gökhan Özoğuz and Hakan Özoğuz, were submitted by the band for the national final and presented between 21 and 24 January 2004 during special broadcasts on TRT 1, TRT Int, and TRT radios for the public to vote for their favourite song via telephone and SMS. The winning song, "For Real", was announced on 24 January during the TRT 1 show Sayısal Gece, hosted by Isik Özden and Ziya Kürküt. In addition to the announcement of Athena's contest entry, dance group Fire of Anatolia and Kayahan –who represented Turkey in Eurovision 1990– performed as guests during the show, which achieved a market share of 3.6% in Turkey.

Final – 24 January 2004
R/O	Song	Televote	Place
1	"I Love Mud on My Face"	10,931	3
2	"Easy Man"	12,024	2
3	"For Real"	86,362	1

== At Eurovision ==
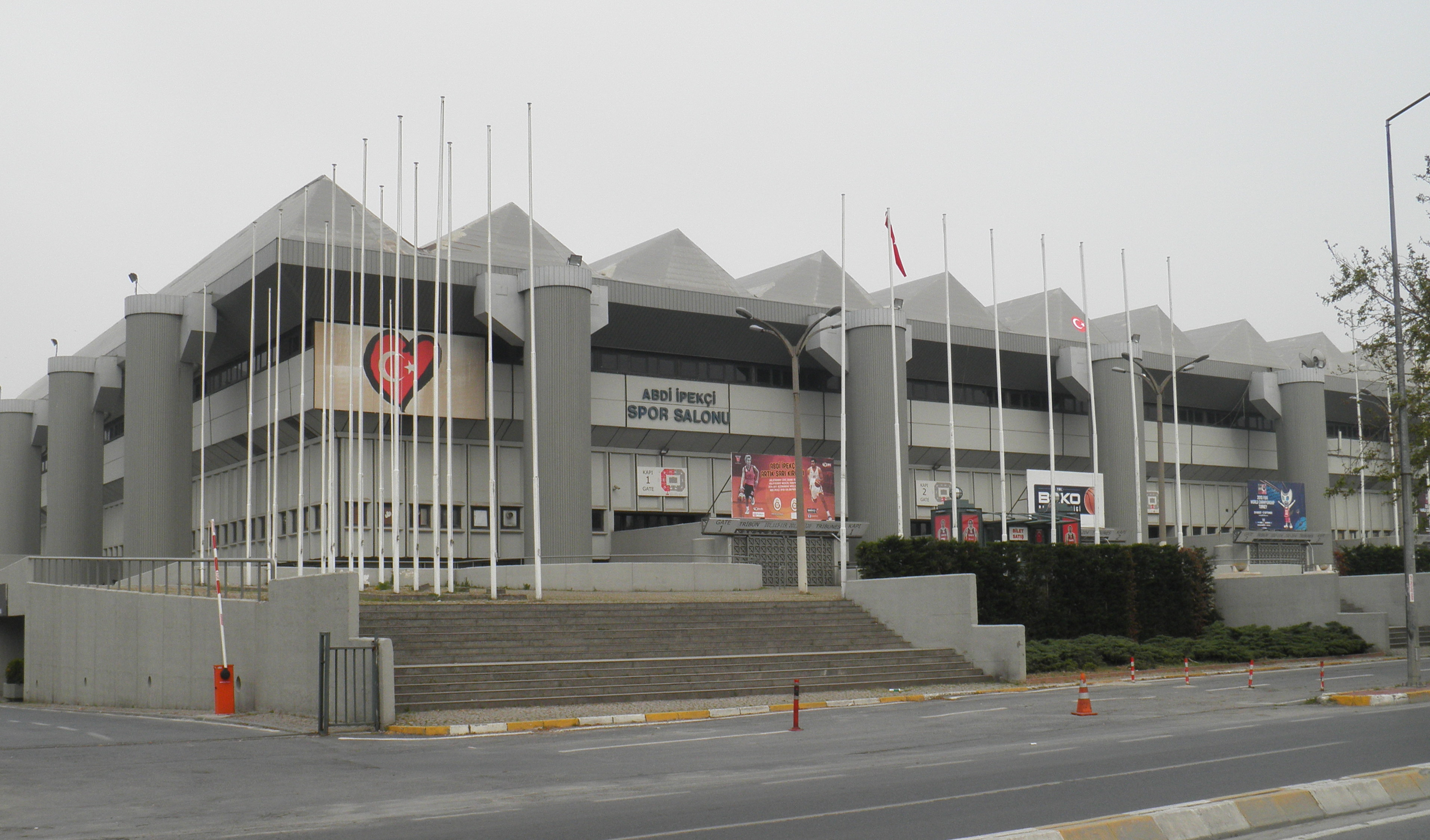
The Eurovision Song Contest 2004 took place at the Abdi İpekçi Arena in Istanbul, Turkey

According to Eurovision rules, all nations with the exceptions of the host country and the "Big Four" (France, Germany, Spain and the United Kingdom) are required to qualify from the semi-final in order to compete for the final; the top ten countries from the semi-final progress to the final. As the host country, Turkey automatically qualified to compete in the final on 15 May 2004. In addition to their participation in the final, Turkey is also required to broadcast and vote in the semi-final. The running order for the final in addition to the semi-final was decided through an allocation draw and Turkey was subsequently drawn to perform in position 22, following the entry from Cyprus and before the entry from Romania. Turkey placed fourth in the final, scoring 195 points.

The show was broadcast in Turkey on TRT 1 and TRT Int with commentary by Bülend Özveren and Didem Tolunay. TRT appointed Meltem Ersan Yazgan as its spokesperson to announce the results of the Turkish televote during the final.

=== Voting ===
Below is a breakdown of points awarded to Turkey and awarded by Turkey in the semi-final and grand final of the contest. The nation awarded its 12 points to Greece in the semi-final and to Ukraine in the final of the contest. Following the release of the televoting figures by the EBU after the conclusion of the competition, it was revealed that a total of 190,746 televotes were cast in Turkey during the two shows: 121,008 votes in the final and 69,738 votes in the semi-final.

==== Points awarded to Turkey ====
Points awarded to Turkey (Final)
Score	Country
12 points	Belgium; France; Germany; Netherlands
10 points	Denmark; Romania
8 points	Albania; Austria; Monaco; Norway; Poland; Russia; Switzerland
7 points	Bosnia and Herzegovina
6 points	Greece; Macedonia; Ukraine; United Kingdom
5 points	Finland; Iceland; Sweden
4 points	Cyprus
3 points	Andorra; Belarus; Croatia; Lithuania
2 points	Israel; Latvia; Serbia and Montenegro; Spain
1 point	Ireland

==== Points awarded by Turkey ====
Points awarded by Turkey (Semi-final)
Score	Country
12 points	Greece
10 points	Bosnia and Herzegovina
8 points	Ukraine
7 points	Serbia and Montenegro
6 points	Albania
5 points	Cyprus
4 points	Israel
3 points	Macedonia
2 points	Netherlands
1 point	Denmark

Points awarded by Turkey (Final)
Score	Country
12 points	Ukraine
10 points	Greece
8 points	Serbia and Montenegro
7 points	Bosnia and Herzegovina
6 points	Albania
5 points	Germany
4 points	Macedonia
3 points	Sweden
2 points	Spain
1 point	Cyprus
