= Aydan Özoğuz =

German politician (SPD), Vice-President of the Bundestag

Aydan Özoğuz MdB
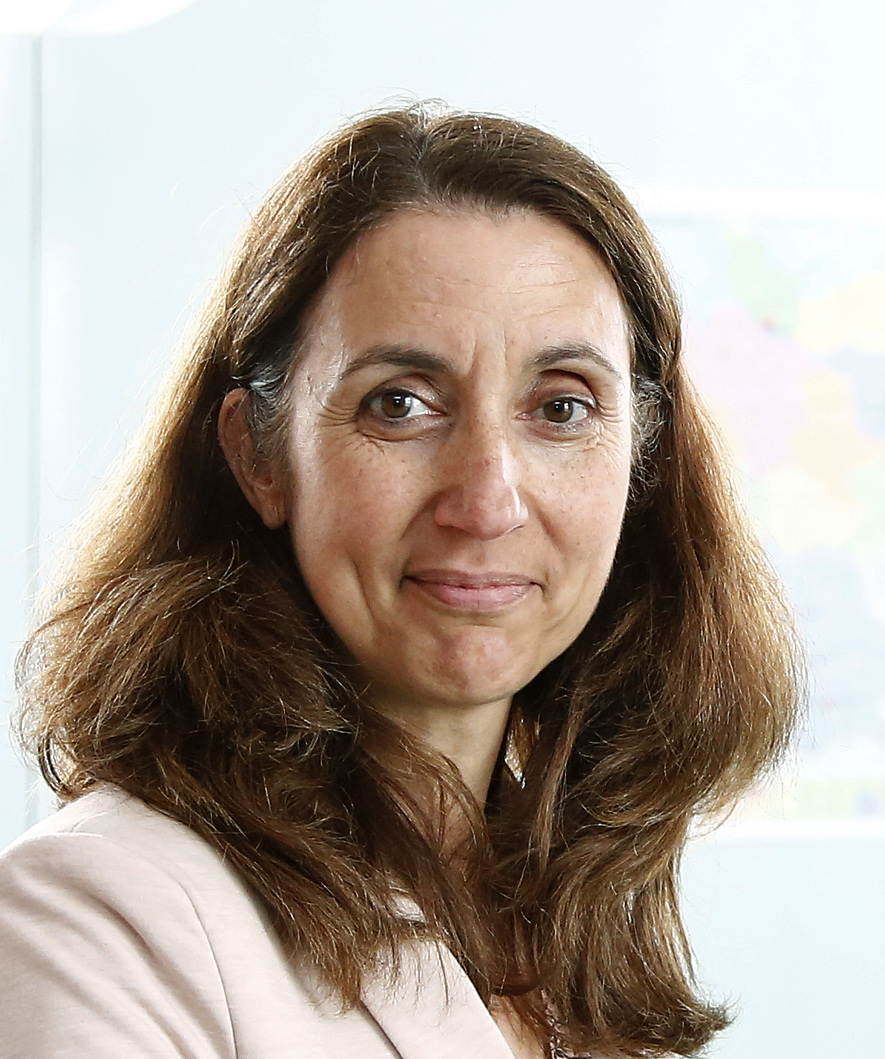
- Özoğuz in 2016

Vice President of the Bundestag (on proposal of the SPD group)
- In office 26 October 2021 – 23 March 2025
- President: Bärbel Bas
- Preceded by: Dagmar Ziegler
- Succeeded by: Josephine Ortleb

Minister of State for Migration, Refugees and Integration
- In office 17 December 2013 – 14 March 2018
- Chancellor: Angela Merkel
- Preceded by: Maria Böhmer
- Succeeded by: Annette Widmann-Mauz

Deputy Leader of the Social Democratic Party
- In office 6 December 2011 – 7 December 2017
- Leader: Sigmar Gabriel; Martin Schulz
- Preceded by: Frank-Walter Steinmeier
- Succeeded by: Malu Dreyer

Member of the Bundestag; from Hamburg
- Incumbent
- Assumed office 27 October 2009
- Constituency: State list (2009–2013); Hamburg-Wandsbek (2013–present)

Member of the Hamburg Parliament
- In office October 2001 – 12 March 2008
- Constituency: State list

Personal details
- Born: 31 May 1967 (age 59) Hamburg, West Germany
- Party: Social Democratic
- Spouse: Michael Neumann (m. 2002; sep. 2017)
- Children: 1
- Relatives: Gökhan Özoğuz (cousin); Hakan Özoğuz (cousin)
- Education: University of Hamburg
- Website: oezoguz.de

Aydan Özoğuz (Turkish: [ˈajdan ˈœzoːuz]; German: [ˈaɪdan ˈøːzoːʔʊs]; born 31 May 1967) is a German politician of the Social Democratic Party (SPD), who has been a member of the Bundestag since 2009 and as its Vice-president of the German Bundestag from 2021 to 2025.

In addition to her parliamentary mandate, Özoğuz served as Commissioner for Immigration, Refugees and Integration at the rank of Minister of State in the third government of Chancellor Angela Merkel from 2013 until 2018. She served as her party's deputy chairperson of the party from 2011 until 2017.

== Early life and education ==
Özoğuz was born on 31 May 1967 in Finkenau, Hamburg to Turkish parents, who came to Germany in 1958. She grew up in Hamburg-Lokstedt. Her parents later went into their own food business. Özoğuz acquired German citizenship in 1989. She has two brothers, Yavuz and Gürhan.

She finished her high school education at Corvey-Gymnasium in 1986 with Abitur. Following her studies in English as a major and Spanish and Human Resources Management as a minor, she completed a master's degree at the University of Hamburg in 1994. During her university years, she was member of the Turkish Student Society in Hamburg, and served as its chairperson for two years.

== Early career ==
Since 1994, Özoğuz was research fellow in the Körber Foundation as project manager of "Coordination of New Projects" with focus on German-Turkish projects. From 1996 on, Özoğuz conducted projects in the field of Youth and Science Exchange as well as academic conferences on issues of international relations. With her election into Bundestag, she was exempted from her post at the Körber Foundation.

== Political career ==
=== Career in state politics ===
Between 2001 and 2008, Özoğuz was member of the State Parliament of Hamburg. She was appointed speaker of the SPD parliamentary group for migration policies and member of the committees of interior affairs, petitions and family.

In 2004, Özoğuz joined the Social Democratic Party of Germany (SPD). She is the first ever Turkish descent woman in the SPD leadership as deputy chairperson.

=== Member of the Bundestag (2009–present) ===
Özoğuz first entered the Bundestag at the 2009 German federal election. She became a member of the Committee on Family Affairs, Senior Citizens, Women and Youth. She served also in the Committee of Inquiry for internet and the digital society. On 2 March 2010, the SPD parliamentary group appointed her commissioner of the group for integration.

Özoğuz was re-elected in the 2013 election, gaining the constituency of Hamburg-Wandsbek. She is one of the eleven politicians of Turkish descent who won a seat in the Bundestag, including seven women.

Since 2018, Özoğuz has been a member of the Committee on Foreign Affairs and on the Committee on Human Rights and Humanitarian Aid. She also serves as deputy chairwoman of the Subcommittee on Disarmament, Arms Control and Non-Proliferation.

Ahead of the 2021 elections, Özoğuz was elected to lead the SPD campaign in Hamburg. In the negotiations to form a so-called traffic light coalition of the SPD, the Green Party and the Free Democrats (FDP) following the elections, she was part of her party's delegation in the working group on migration and integration, co-chaired by Boris Pistorius, Luise Amtsberg and Joachim Stamp.

=== Federal Commissioner for Immigration, Refugees and Integration (2013–2018) ===
On 16 December 2013, Özoğuz was appointed Commissioner for Immigration, Refugees and Integration (German: Beauftragter der Bundesregierung für Migration, Flüchtlinge und Integration) in the third Merkel cabinet, succeeding Maria Böhmer (CDU). She was the first ever woman with Turkish roots and Muslim member of the German Federal Government as Minister of State.

In April 2015, Özoğuz accompanied German President Joachim Gauck on a state visit to Turkey. In September 2015, amid the European migrant crisis, she joined Vice Chancellor Sigmar Gabriel on a trip to the Zaatari refugee camp in Jordan to learn more about the plight of Syrians fleeing from Syrian civil war which erupted in 2011.

Together with Doris Ahnen, Niels Annen, Michael Groschek and Manuela Schwesig, Özoğuz co-chaired the SPD's 2017 extraordinary convention in Dortmund.

In the negotiations to form a fourth coalition government under Chancellor Angela Merkel following the 2017 federal elections, Özoğuz was part of the working group on migration policy, led by Volker Bouffier, Joachim Herrmann and Ralf Stegner.

== Political positions ==
=== Domestic policy ===
In May 2017, Özoğuz wrote a guest commentary in the newspaper Tagesspiegel in which she stated that a specific German culture "aside from the language is simply not identifiable", as "already historically, rather regional cultures, immigration and diversity have shaped our history". She added that "Globalisation and pluralisation of lifeworlds leads to a further diversification of diversity."

=== Human rights ===
In August 2012, Özoğuz was one of 124 members of the Bundestag to sign a letter that was sent to the Russian ambassador to Germany, Vladimir Grinin, expressing concern over the trial against the three members of Pussy Riot. "Being held in detention for months and the threat of lengthy punishment are draconian and disproportionate," the lawmakers said in the letter. "In a secular and pluralist state, peaceful artistic acts – even if they can be seen as provocative – must not lead to the accusation of serious criminal acts that lead to lengthy prison terms."

=== Israel-Gaza Conflict ===
On 18 October 2024, Özoğuz shared a post on a social media platform published by Jewish Voice for Peace that, per the media organisation Barron's, 'showed an image of a building on fire with the message "This is Zionism".'

== Other activities ==
- Tarabya Cultural Academy, Member of the Advisory Board (since 2022)
- Islamkolleg Deutschland (IKD), Member of the Board of Trustees (since 2021)
- Aktion Deutschland Hilft (Germany's Relief Coalition), Member of the Board of Trustees (since 2019)
- Berghof Foundation, Member of the Advisory Council
- Friedrich Ebert Foundation (FES), Member of the Board of Trustees
- Foundation for History of Federal Republic of Germany, Deputy Member of the Board of the Trustees (German: Stiftung Haus der Geschichte der Bundesrepublik Deutschland).
- Stiftung Lesen, Member of the Board of Trustees
- Bündnis für Demokratie und Toleranz, Ex-officio Member of the advisory board (2013–2018)

== Personal life ==
Özoğuz is married to Michael Neumann, Senator of Interior Affairs from SPD in the state government of Hamburg, and has a daughter, Hanna.

Her brothers, Yavuz Özoğuz and Gürhan Özoğuz—both staunch supporters of the Islamic Republic of Iran and Hezbollah—run the Islamist internet site Muslim-Markt. Özoğuz distanced herself from her brothers on their radical Islamist viewpoints in a newspaper interview in October 2011.

Her twin cousins Hakan Özoğuz and Gökhan Özoğuz are part of the ska punk band Athena from Istanbul, Turkey.
