= Altüst (album) =

Altust is Turkish band Athena's eight studio album, released on November 11, 2014. All the songs in the album belong to Gökhan Özoğuz and Hakan Özoğuz. The album was recorded live at FadeOut Studios by producer Mike Nielsen.

== Track listing ==
1. Davet
2. Kafama Göre
3. Üç Lira Bir Anahtar
4. Kaçak
5. Yamyam Zurna
6. Ses Etme
7. Yapma Be Kanka
8. Kalem
9. Parçalanıyoruz
10. Bu Adam Fezadan
11. Tek Başına
12. Adımız Miskindir Bizim (feat. Mazhar Alanson)
13. Bela
