= Eurovision Song Contest 2004 =

International song competition

Coordinates: 41°00′44″N 28°58′34″E

- Under the Same Sky

Dates and venue
- Semi-final: 12 May 2004
- Final: 15 May 2004
- Venue: Abdi İpekçi Arena; Istanbul, Turkey

Organisation
- Organiser: European Broadcasting Union (EBU)
- Executive supervisor: Svante Stockselius

Production
- Host broadcaster: Turkish Radio and Television Corporation (TRT)
- Director: Sven Stojanović
- Executive producer: Bülent Osma
- Presenters: Korhan Abay; Meltem Cumbul

Participants
- Number of entries: 36
- Number of finalists: 24
- Debuting countries: Albania; Andorra; Belarus; Serbia and Montenegro
- Returning countries: Denmark; Finland; Lithuania; Macedonia; Monaco; Switzerland
- Participation map: Finalist countries Countries eliminated in the semi-final Countries that participated in the past but not in 2004

Vote
- Voting system: Each country awarded 12, 10, 8-1 point(s) to their 10 favourite songs
- Winning song: Ukraine; "Wild Dances"

The Eurovision Song Contest 2004 was the 49th edition of the Eurovision Song Contest. It consisted —for the first time— of a semi-final on 12 May and a final on 15 May 2004, held at the Abdi İpekçi Arena in Istanbul, Turkey, and presented by Korhan Abay and Meltem Cumbul. It was organised by the European Broadcasting Union (EBU) and host broadcaster Turkish Radio and Television Corporation (TRT), who staged the event after winning the 2003 contest for Turkey with the song "Everyway That I Can" by Sertab Erener. It was also the first time since the 1998 contest in Birmingham that it was not hosted in the host country's capital city.

Broadcasters from thirty-six countries participated in the contest, beating the record of twenty-six in the previous edition. Albania, Andorra, Belarus, and Serbia and Montenegro took part for the first time this year. The old relegation system was replaced with a semi-final format. This was done in order to accommodate the increasing number of countries who wished to participate. The new format allowed all countries to participate every year, rather than being forced to sit out per the relegation rules, which had been the standard since 1994. Because of this, Denmark, Finland, Lithuania, Macedonia, Monaco, and Switzerland all returned to the contest, Monaco not having competed since 1979.

The winner was Ukraine with the song "Wild Dances", performed by Ruslana who wrote it with her husband Oleksandr Ksenofontov. This was Ukraine's first victory in the contest, only one year after the country made its debut in 2003. Serbia and Montenegro, Greece, Turkey, and Cyprus rounded out the top five, with Greece and Cyprus both equalling its previous best results. Meanwhile, Ireland finished in 22nd place, giving the nation its worst placement up to that point. Due to the expansion of the contest, this year was the first time in which a non-winning entry scored over 200 points. Prior to this contest, only the winning entries for Ireland in 1994 and the United Kingdom in 1997 had passed this mark. In this contest, the top 3 songs all got over 200 points. An official CD was released and, for the first time, the entire contest was released on DVD which included the semi-final and the final.

== Location ==
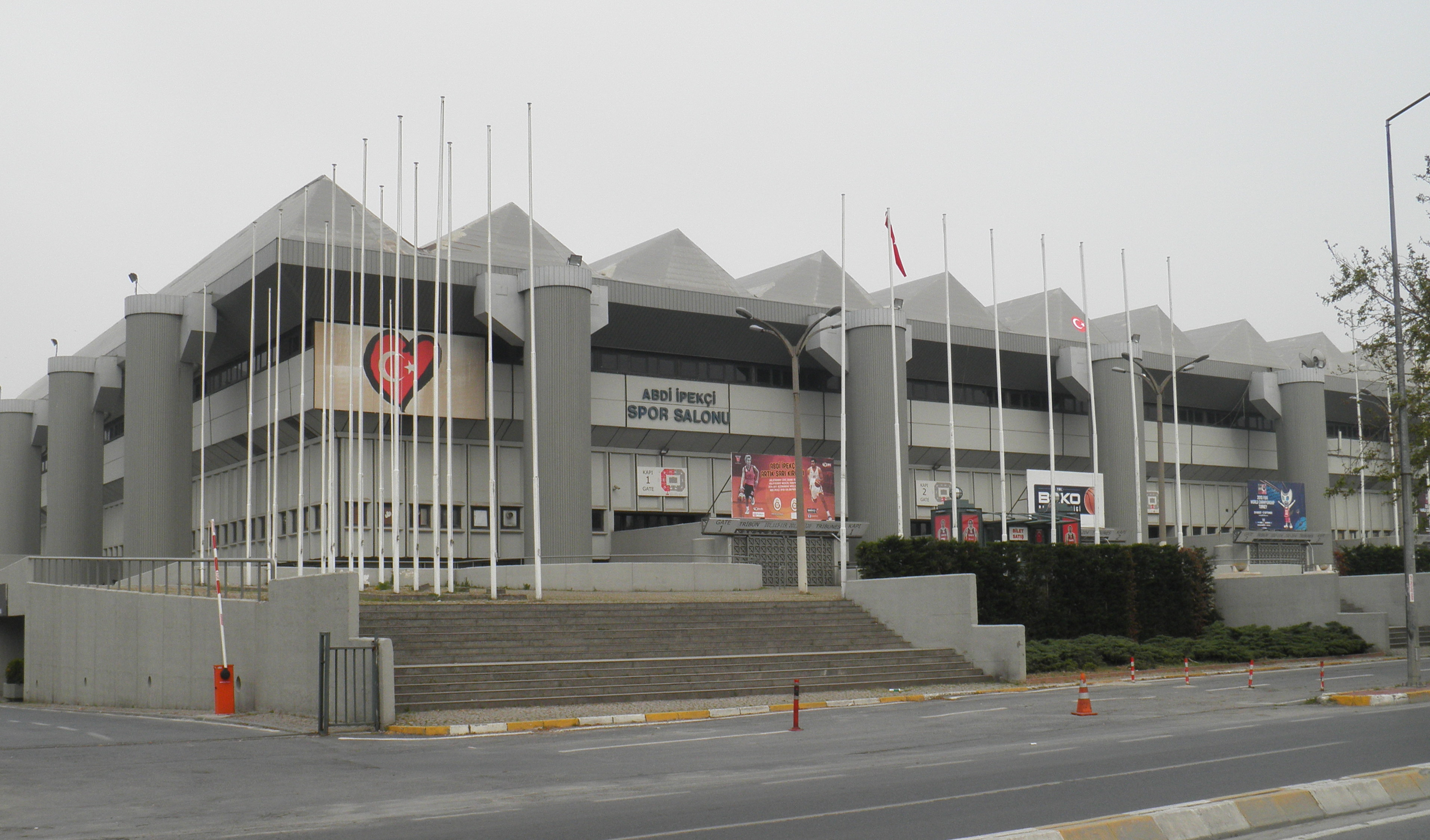
Abdi İpekçi Arena, Istanbul – host venue of the 2004 contest.

Locations of the suggested venues in Istanbul, Turkey: the chosen venue is marked in blue, while eliminated venues are marked in red

Istanbul was chosen as the host city of the 2004 edition following Turkey's victory in the 2003 contest in Riga, Latvia with "Everyway That I Can" by Sertab Erener. Originally the Mydonose Showland, an entertainment center in the form of a giant pyramid tent near Atatürk International Airport, was chosen by Turkish Radio and Television Corporation (TRT) to host the event, but the venue was later changed to the Abdi İpekçi Arena as the contest approached due to its bigger capacity. The Mydonose Showland, later renamed the Istanbul Show Center, was demolished in 2009 after a fire destroyed it in April that year. The Abdi İpekçi Arena was closed after the 2016/2017 basketball season and was demolished in early 2018, with the Basketball Development Center currently occupying its place.

A number of other venues in the city were reported as possible venues, these included Ataköy Athletics Arena and Istanbul Lütfi Kırdar International Convention and Exhibition Center (ICEC), the latter of which lost out to Mydonose Showland. Istanbul Chamber of Commerce president Mehmet Yıldırım offered the World Trade Center Istanbul (WTCI) as a venue for the event and confirmed that the Chamber would also provide financial support for the contest's organisation.

== Participants ==
Eurovision Song Contest 2004 – Participation summaries by country
- Albania; Andorra; Austria; Belarus; Belgium; Bosnia and Herzegovina; Croatia; Cyprus; Denmark; Estonia; Finland; France; Germany; Greece; Iceland; Ireland; Israel; Latvia; Lithuania; Macedonia; Malta; Monaco; Netherlands; Norway; Poland; Portugal; Romania; Russia; Serbia and Montenegro; Slovenia; Spain; Sweden; Switzerland; Turkey; Ukraine; United Kingdom

This year's Eurovision contest was the first to be a two-day event, with one qualifying round held on a Wednesday and the grand final held on the following Saturday. Under this new format, byes into the final were given to the 'Big 4'; France, Germany, Spain, and the United Kingdom –whose broadcasters were the largest financial contributors to the European Broadcasting Union (EBU)– and the ten highest placed finishers in the 2003 contest.

Andorra, Albania, Belarus, and Serbia and Montenegro participated in the contest for the first time, with Monaco returning after a 25-year absence. Luxembourg were due to return after an absence of 11 years, but later pulled out after money issues arose between RTL Télé Lëtzebuerg (RTL) and the EBU. Hungary was also due to return after last participating in 1998, but ultimately they did not take part in the contest. Hungary would eventually return to the contest the following year, while Luxembourg would not return to the contest until 2024.

All participating countries had the right to vote in both the qualifying round and the grand final. This was the first year in which all 36 participating countries voted based on a public phone vote, in the final. However France, Poland, and Russia did not broadcast the semi-final (as they were not participating in it) and therefore did not give votes for it like the other thirty-three countries. In Belgium, the French-language Radio-télévision belge de la Communauté française (RTBF) did not broadcast the semi-final, but the Dutch-language Vlaamse Radio- en Televisieomroeporganisatie (VRT) did. Monaco's televoting results in the semi-final were rendered invalid and a back-up jury had to be used, but no problems occurred in the final.

Stefan Raab, who had represented Germany in 2000, provided backing vocals for his country.

Eurovision Song Contest 2004 participants
Country	Broadcaster	Artist	Song	Language	Songwriter(s)
Albania	RTSH	Anjeza Shahini	"The Image of You"	English	Agim Doçi; Edmond Zhulali
Andorra	RTVA	Marta Roure	"Jugarem a estimar-nos"	Catalan	Jofre Bardagí
Austria	ORF	Tie Break	"Du bist"	German	Peter Zimmermann
Belarus	BTRC	Aleksandra and Konstantin	"My Galileo"	English	Kanstantsin Drapeza; Aljaksandra Kirsanava; Aliaksiej Salamacha
Belgium	VRT	Xandee	"1 Life"	English	Dirk Paelinck; Marc Paelinck
Bosnia and Herzegovina	PBSBiH	Deen	"In the Disco"	English	Vesna Pisarović
Croatia	HRT	Ivan Mikulić	"You Are the Only One"	English	Duško Gruborović; Marina Madrinić; Ivan Mikulić
Cyprus	CyBC	Lisa Andreas	"Stronger Every Minute"	English	Mike Connaris
Denmark	DR	Tomas Thordarson	"Shame on You"	English	Ivar Lind Greiner; Iben Plesner
Estonia	ETV	Neiokõsõ	"Tii"	Võro	Aapo Ilves; Priit Pajusaar; Glen Pilvre
Finland	YLE	Jari Sillanpää	"Takes 2 to Tango"	English	Jari Sillanpää; Mika Toivanen
France	France Télévisions	Jonatan Cerrada	"À chaque pas"	French, Spanish	Steve Balsamo; Jonatan Cerrada; Ben "Jammin" Robbins
Germany	NDR (Note: On behalf of the German public broadcasting consortium ARD)	Max	"Can't Wait Until Tonight"	English, Turkish	Stefan Raab
Greece	ERT	Sakis Rouvas	"Shake It"	English	Nikos Terzis; Nektarios Tyrakis
Iceland	RÚV	Jónsi	"Heaven"	English	Magnús Þór Sigmundsson; Sveinn Rúnar Sigurðsson
Ireland	RTÉ	Chris Doran	"If My World Stopped Turning"	English	Brian McFadden; Jonathan Shorten
Israel	IBA	David D'Or	"Leha'amin" (להאמין)	Hebrew, English	David D'Or; Ehud Manor; Ofer Meiri
Latvia	LTV	Fomins and Kleins	"Dziesma par laimi"	Latvian	Tomass Kleins; Guntars Račs
Lithuania	LRT	Linas and Simona	"What's Happened to Your Love"	English	Linas Adomaitis; Michalis Antoniou; Camden-MS
Macedonia	MRT	Toše Proeski	"Life"	English	Irena Dukić; Jovan Jovanov; Damjan Lazarov
Malta	PBS	Julie and Ludwig	"On Again... Off Again"	English	Gerard James Borg; Philip Vella
Monaco	TMC	Maryon	"Notre planète"	French	Philippe Bosco; Patrick Sassier
Netherlands	NOS	Re-union	"Without You"	English	Angeline van Otterdijk; Ed van Otterdijk
Norway	NRK	Knut Anders Sørum	"High"	English	Lars Andersson; Dan Attlerud; Thomas Thörnholm
Poland	TVP	Blue Café	"Love Song"	English, Spanish	Tatiana Okupnik; Paweł Rurak-Sokal
Portugal	RTP	Sofia Vitória	"Foi magia"	Portuguese	Paulo Neves
Romania	TVR	Sanda	"I Admit"	English	Irina Gligor; George Popa
Russia	C1R	Yulia Savicheva	"Believe Me"	English	Maxim Fadeev; Brenda Loring
Serbia and Montenegro	UJRT	Željko Joksimović and Ad Hoc Orchestra	"Lane moje" (Лане моје)	Serbian	Željko Joksimović; Leontina Vukomanović
Slovenia	RTVSLO	Platin	"Stay Forever"	English	Simon Gomilšek; Diana Lečnik
Spain	TVE	Ramón	"Para llenarme de ti"	Spanish	Kike Santander
Sweden	SVT	Lena Philipsson	"It Hurts"	English	Thomas "Orup" Eriksson
Switzerland	SRG SSR	Piero and the MusicStars	"Celebrate"	English	Greg Manning
Turkey	TRT	Athena	"For Real"	English	Gökhan Özoğuz; Hakan Özoğuz
Ukraine	NTU	Ruslana	"Wild Dances"	English, Ukrainian	Oleksandr Ksenofontov; Ruslana Lyzhychko
United Kingdom	BBC	James Fox	"Hold On to Our Love"	English	Gary Miller; Tim Woodcock

== Format ==
=== Visual design ===
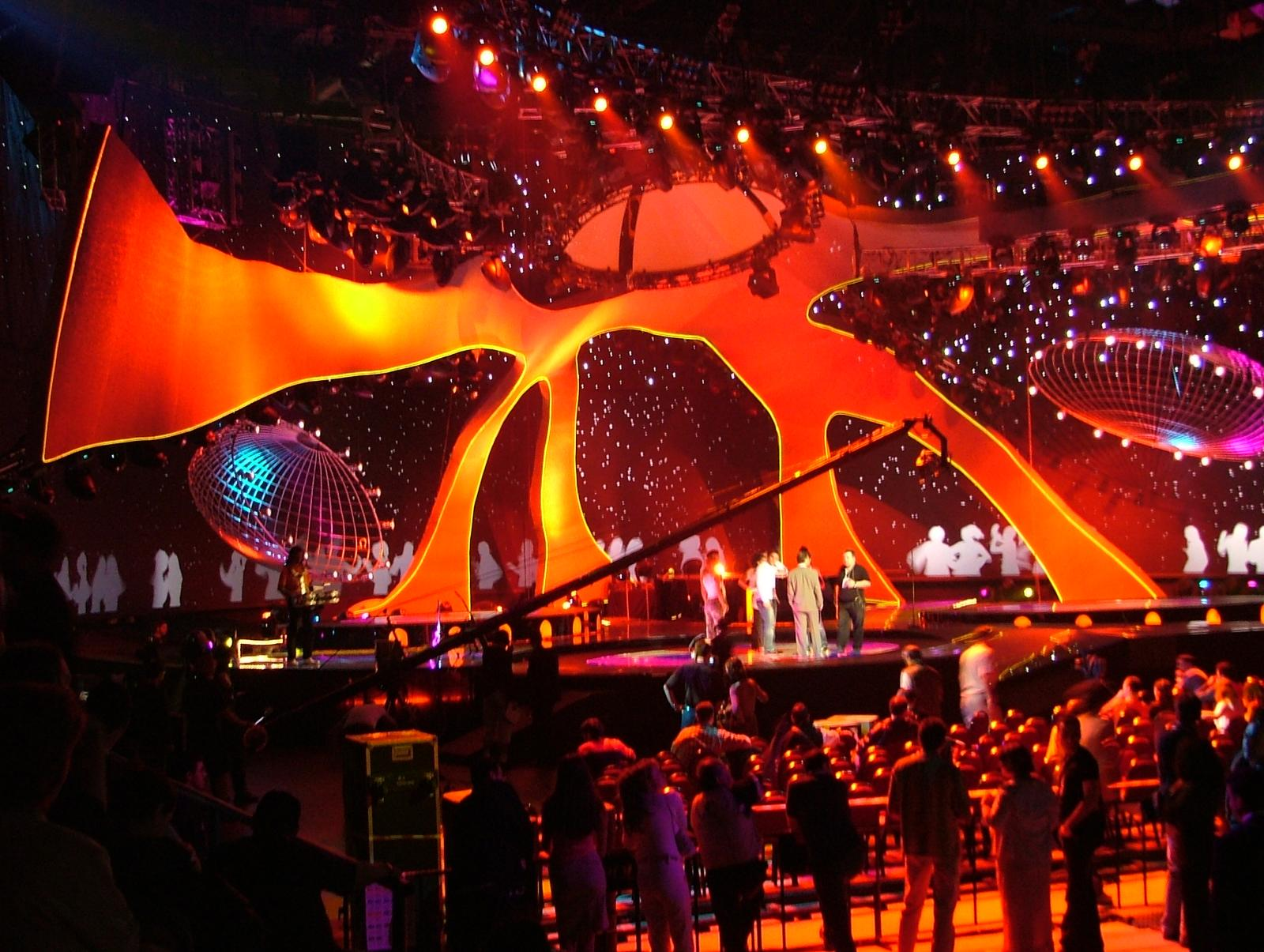
The stage design of the contest

The contest's new official generic logo was used for the first time this year, with the heart-shaped flag in the centre due to be changed for future contests. The slogan for Istanbul's contest was "Under the Same Sky", which communicated the importance of a united Europe and Turkish integration.

=== Voting structure ===
Every country in the competition, including those who did not qualify for the final, were allowed to vote for other countries. After all performances were completed, each country opened their phone lines to allow their viewers to vote for their favourite song. Voting for the country in which you are situated is not allowed, however. Each country awarded points based on the number of votes cast for each song: the song which received the most viewer votes was awarded 12 points, the second 10 points, the third 8 points and then 7, 6, 5, etc. down to 1.

In the event of a tie, the number of countries to vote for the tying songs would be counted, and the song having the most countries awarding points to it, would be the winner. In the event of a further tie, then the previously used method of counting back on the number of 12 points, 10 points etc., would be used to find an eventual winner.

This was also the first year that the scores were only re-read by the hosts in one language. Before 2004 every point was repeated in French and English, but due to 36 countries voting, and more in years to come, in 2004 to save time the hosts only re-read each score in one language. This was in the opposite of the original country representative spoke in.

== Contest overview ==
=== Semi-final ===
Countries participating in the semi-final The top ten of the 2003 contest, who automatically qualify. The "Big Four" countries, who automatically qualify.

The semi-final was held on 12 May 2004 at 22:00 EEST (21:00 CEST) . 22 countries performed and all participants voted except France, Poland, and Russia who opted not to broadcast the show. The highlighted countries qualified for the final.

A new ABBA video was shown in the semi-final, briefly outlining how ABBA started and what the response was of the first record company they approached. It featured small puppets of the band performing snippets of their songs (the voices being the ones of the band) and featured Rik Mayall as the record company manager. Due to copyright purposes, this was cut from the Eurovision Song Contest DVD and released separately. References to the video before it was shown were also cut.

Qualifiers

Results of the semi-final of the Eurovision Song Contest 2004
R/O	Country	Artist	Song	Points	Place
1	Finland	Jari Sillanpää	"Takes 2 to Tango"	51	14
2	Belarus	Aleksandra and Konstantin	"My Galileo"	10	19
3	Switzerland	Piero and the MusicStars	"Celebrate"	0	22
4	Latvia	Fomins and Kleins	"Dziesma par laimi"	23	17
5	Israel	David D'Or	"Leha'amin"	57	11
6	Andorra	Marta Roure	"Jugarem a estimar-nos"	12	18
7	Portugal	Sofia Vitória	"Foi magia"	38	15
8	Malta	Julie and Ludwig	"On Again... Off Again"	74	8
9	Monaco	Maryon	"Notre planète"	10	19
10	Greece	Sakis Rouvas	"Shake It"	238	3
11	Ukraine	Ruslana	"Wild Dances"	256	2
12	Lithuania	Linas and Simona	"What's Happened to Your Love"	26	16
13	Albania	Anjeza Shahini	"The Image of You"	167	4
14	Cyprus	Lisa Andreas	"Stronger Every Minute"	149	5
15	Macedonia	Toše Proeski	"Life"	71	10
16	Slovenia	Platin	"Stay Forever"	5	21
17	Estonia	Neiokõsõ	"Tii"	57	11
18	Croatia	Ivan Mikulić	"You Are the Only One"	72	9
19	Denmark	Tomas Thordarson	"Shame on You"	56	13
20	Serbia and Montenegro	Željko Joksimović and Ad-Hoc Orchestra	"Lane moje"	263	1
21	Bosnia and Herzegovina	Deen	"In the Disco"	133	7
22	Netherlands	Re-union	"Without You"	146	6

=== Final ===
The finalists were:

- the four automatic qualifiers France, Germany, Spain, and the United Kingdom;
- the top 10 countries from the 2003 contest (other than the automatic qualifiers);
- the top 10 countries from the 2004 semi-final.

The final was held on 15 May 2004 at 22:00 EEST (21:00 CEST) and was won by Ukraine. 24 countries performed and all 36 participants voted.

In the semi-final and the final, Meltem Cumbul warmed up the audience with a sing-a-long of Eurovision classic "Nel blu dipinto di blu (Volare)", originally performed by Domenico Modugno. Sertab Erener returned to the stage in the final to perform "Everyway That I Can", the 2003 winning song, and one of her new songs called "Leave". Sertab also interviewed contestants in the green room. The Turkish dance ensemble Fire of Anatolia performed as the interval act.

Ukraine won with 280 points. Serbia and Montenegro came second with 263 points, with Greece, Turkey, Cyprus, Sweden, Albania, Germany, Bosnia and Herzegovina and Spain completing the top ten. Netherlands, Austria, Belgium, Ireland and Norway occupied the bottom five positions. The latter came last for the 10th time and would go on to place last twice more in the next 20 years.

Winner

Results of the final of the Eurovision Song Contest 2004
R/O	Country	Artist	Song	Points	Place
1	Spain	Ramón	"Para llenarme de ti"	87	10
2	Austria	Tie Break	"Du bist"	9	21
3	Norway	Knut Anders Sørum	"High"	3	24
4	France	Jonatan Cerrada	"À chaque pas"	40	15
5	Serbia and Montenegro	Željko Joksimović and Ad-Hoc Orchestra	"Lane moje"	263	2
6	Malta	Julie and Ludwig	"On Again... Off Again"	50	12
7	Netherlands	Re-union	"Without You"	11	20
8	Germany	Max	"Can't Wait Until Tonight"	93	8
9	Albania	Anjeza Shahini	"The Image of You"	106	7
10	Ukraine	Ruslana	"Wild Dances"	280	1
11	Croatia	Ivan Mikulić	"You Are the Only One"	50	12
12	Bosnia and Herzegovina	Deen	"In the Disco"	91	9
13	Belgium	Xandee	"1 Life"	7	22
14	Russia	Julia Savicheva	"Believe Me"	67	11
15	Macedonia	Toše Proeski	"Life"	47	14
16	Greece	Sakis Rouvas	"Shake It"	252	3
17	Iceland	Jónsi	"Heaven"	16	19
18	Ireland	Chris Doran	"If My World Stopped Turning"	7	22
19	Poland	Blue Café	"Love Song"	27	17
20	United Kingdom	James Fox	"Hold On to Our Love"	29	16
21	Cyprus	Lisa Andreas	"Stronger Every Minute"	170	5
22	Turkey	Athena	"For Real"	195	4
23	Romania	Sanda	"I Admit"	18	18
24	Sweden	Lena Philipsson	"It Hurts"	170	5

==== Spokespersons ====
Each participating broadcaster appointed a spokesperson to announce its respective country's points in the final. The voting order in the 2004 contest was determined alphabetically by each country's ISO two-letter country code.

1. Andorra – Pati Molné
2. Albania – Zhani Ciko
3. Austria – Dodo Roscic
4. Bosnia and Herzegovina – Mija Martina
5. Belgium – Martine Prenen
6. Belarus – Denis Kurian
7. Switzerland – Emel Aykanat
8. Serbia and Montenegro – Nataša Miljković
9. Cyprus – Loukas Hamatsos
10. Germany – Thomas Anders
11. Denmark – Camilla Ottesen
12. Estonia – Maarja-Liis Ilus
13. Spain – Anne Igartiburu
14. Finland – Anna Stenlund
15. France – Alex Taylor
16. United Kingdom – Lorraine Kelly
17. Greece – Alexis Kostalas
18. Croatia – Barbara Kolar
19. Ireland – Johnny Logan
20. Israel – Merav Miller
21. Iceland – Sigrún Ósk Kristjánsdóttir
22. Lithuania – Rolandas Vilkončius
23. Latvia – Lauris Reiniks
24. Monaco – Anne Allegrini
25. Macedonia – Karolina Petkovska
26. Malta – Claire Agius
27. Netherlands – Esther Hart
28. Norway – Ingvild Helljesen
29. Poland – Maciej Orłoś
30. Portugal – Isabel Angelino
31. Romania – Andreea Marin
32. Russia – Yana Churikova
33. Sweden – Jovan Radomir
34. Slovenia – Peter Poles
35. Turkey – Meltem Ersan Yazgan
36. Ukraine – Pavlo Shylko

== Detailed voting results ==
=== Semi-final ===
Detailed voting results of the semi-final
Voting procedure used: 100% televoting 100% jury vote		Total score	Andorra	Albania	Austria	Bosnia and Herzegovina	Belgium	Belarus	Switzerland	Serbia and Montenegro	Cyprus	Germany	Denmark	Estonia	Spain	Finland	United Kingdom	Greece	Croatia	Ireland	Israel	Iceland	Lithuania	Latvia	Monaco	Macedonia	Malta	Netherlands	Norway	Portugal	Romania	Sweden	Slovenia	Turkey	Ukraine
Contestants	Finland	51		7			1				6			7	3			5				3			6	2			3			8			
Contestants	Belarus	10												2								1	2												5
Contestants	Switzerland	0																																	
Contestants	Latvia	23						4						5						4	2		6		2										
Contestants	Israel	57	3	5	1		2	3		3	2	1	2		4	2	2	3									6	2		7	5			4	
Contestants	Andorra	12													12																				
Contestants	Portugal	38	12				4		7						6										1						8				
Contestants	Malta	74	5	6		4		1					4	10			5	1	1	1	6	2	7	7		4		3		4			1		2
Contestants	Monaco	10	4	2							4																								
Contestants	Greece	238	8	12	5	5	10	8	3	10	12	10	3	4	7	5	12		6	2	12	6	8	6	4	7	12	6	5	8	12	4	4	12	10
Contestants	Ukraine	256	10	3	4	7	8	12	2	8	8	6	6	12	10	8	7	7	8	10	10	10	12	10	5	8	10	7	7	12	7	6	8	8	
Contestants	Lithuania	26						2			7							2		3	1			8			3								
Contestants	Albania	167	6		7	6	5		10	6	1	8	7	1	2	6	6	8	7	5	4	4		5	3	12	8	5	8	2	6	7	5	6	1
Contestants	Cyprus	149	2		6		6	6	1	2		4	5	6	1	7	10	12	2	8	3	8	4	3	12		5	10	4	3	1	3	3	5	7
Contestants	Macedonia	71		8	2	8			5	12		3	1					4	5								1	1			4	2	6	3	6
Contestants	Slovenia	5				1													3							1									
Contestants	Estonia	57		1						4						12	1					7	10	12					1	5		1			3
Contestants	Croatia	72			8	10		7	6	5		5				1							3	1		6		4		1			7		8
Contestants	Denmark	56				3					3			3		4					5	12			10		2		6		2	5		1	
Contestants	Serbia and Montenegro	263	1	4	12	12	7	10	12		10	12	10		8	10	8	10	12	6	8		1	4	7	10	4	12	10	10	10	12	12	7	12
Contestants	Bosnia and Herzegovina	133		10	10		3		8	7		7	12				4		10	7						5		8	12			10	10	10	
Contestants	Netherlands	146	7		3	2	12	5	4	1	5	2	8	8	5	3	3	6	4	12	7	5	5	2	8	3	7		2	6	3		2	2	4

==== 12 points ====
Below is a summary of all 12 points in the semi-final:

N.	Contestant	Nation(s) giving 12 points
9	Serbia and Montenegro	Austria, Bosnia and Herzegovina, Croatia, Germany, Netherlands, Slovenia, Sweden, Switzerland, Ukraine
7	Greece	Albania, Cyprus, Israel, Malta, Romania, Turkey, United Kingdom
4	Ukraine	Belarus, Estonia, Lithuania, Portugal
2	Bosnia and Herzegovina	Denmark, Norway
2	Cyprus	Greece, Monaco
2	Estonia	Finland, Latvia
2	Netherlands	Belgium, Ireland
1	Albania	Macedonia
1	Andorra	Spain
1	Denmark	Iceland
1	Macedonia	Serbia and Montenegro
1	Portugal	Andorra

=== Final ===
Detailed voting results of the final
Voting procedure used: 100% televoting		Total score	Andorra	Albania	Austria	Bosnia and Herzegovina	Belgium	Belarus	Switzerland	Serbia and Montenegro	Cyprus	Germany	Denmark	Estonia	Spain	Finland	France	United Kingdom	Greece	Croatia	Ireland	Israel	Iceland	Lithuania	Latvia	Monaco	Macedonia	Malta	Netherlands	Norway	Poland	Portugal	Romania	Russia	Sweden	Slovenia	Turkey	Ukraine
Contestants	Spain	87	12				7	2	6		7	2					8		3			8	1			3	1	3	4		1	12	5				2	
Contestants	Austria	9															4		5																			
Contestants	Norway	3																																	3			
Contestants	France	40	7	1			10								4											12						2		4				
Contestants	Serbia and Montenegro	263	2	7	12	12	3	7	12		10	10	7	1	6	10	10	3	8	12	3	7	7	2	5	1	10	6	10	6	5	7	8	10	12	12	8	12
Contestants	Malta	50	6	3		1							1	6				2	1	2	6	4		4	6		3				3	1						1
Contestants	Netherlands	11					6							3														2										
Contestants	Germany	93		2	10	3			10					2	12		7	4		1	4			1		7			3	1	6	8	4			3	5	
Contestants	Albania	106			5	4	1		7	8		5	4			3	1	1	10	6	2		4		1		12	10	1	3			1		7	4	6	
Contestants	Ukraine	280	10	5	4	6	5	10		10	8	6	5	12	8	8	2	5	7	8	7	12	12	12	12	6	8	8	7	7	12	10	6	12	10	8	12	
Contestants	Croatia	50			3	10		5	3	5		1				1											5							5		5		7
Contestants	Bosnia and Herzegovina	91		10	7				5	6			8							10						4	4		2	10					8	10	7	
Contestants	Belgium	7	1								1																		5									
Contestants	Russia	67						12		1	6			8		4			2			6		8	10													10
Contestants	Macedonia	47		6		8			1	12										5								1								7	4	3
Contestants	Greece	252	8	12	2	5	8	6	4	7	12	7	3	5	7	6	6	12		7	5	10	6	10	7	10	7	12	6	2	7	6	12	7	4	6	10	8
Contestants	Iceland	16											2			2										5				5				2				
Contestants	Ireland	7																7																				
Contestants	Poland	27									2	4			1				4				3	7											1			5
Contestants	United Kingdom	29						1						4							8		2		3			4			2		2	1	2			
Contestants	Cyprus	170	4		6		4	8	2	3		8	6	7	3	7	5	10	12	4	10	3	10	5	4	2		7	8	4	4	3	3	6	6	1	1	4
Contestants	Turkey	195	3	8	8	7	12	3	8	2	4	12	10		2	5	12	6	6	3	1	2	5	3	2	8	6		12	8	8		10	8	5			6
Contestants	Romania	18									3				10							1										4						
Contestants	Sweden	170	5	4	1	2	2	4		4	5	3	12	10	5	12	3	8			12	5	8	6	8		2	5		12	10	5	7	3		2	3	2

==== 12 points ====
Below is a summary of all 12 points in the final:

N.	Contestant	Nation(s) giving 12 points
8	Ukraine	Estonia, Iceland, Israel, Latvia, Lithuania, Poland, Russia, Turkey
7	Serbia and Montenegro	Austria, Bosnia and Herzegovina, Croatia, Slovenia, Sweden, Switzerland, Ukraine
5	Greece	Albania, Cyprus, Malta, Romania, United Kingdom
4	Sweden	Denmark, Finland, Ireland, Norway
4	Turkey	Belgium, France, Germany, Netherlands
2	Spain	Andorra, Portugal
1	Albania	Macedonia
1	Cyprus	Greece
1	France	Monaco
1	Germany	Spain
1	Macedonia	Serbia and Montenegro
1	Russia	Belarus

== Broadcasts ==
Known details on the broadcasts in each country, including the specific broadcasting stations and commentators, are shown in the tables below.

Broadcasters and commentators in participating countries
Country	Broadcaster	Channel(s)	Show(s)	Commentator(s)	Ref(s)
Andorra	RTVA	ATV	All shows	Meri Picart and Josep Lluís Trabal	
Austria	ORF	ORF 1	All shows	Andi Knoll	
Belarus	BTRC		All shows	Ales Kruglyakov and Denis Dudinsky	
Belgium	VRT	TV1	All shows		
Belgium	RTBF	La Une	Final	Jean-Pierre Hautier	
Belgium	RTBF	La Première	Final		
Bosnia and Herzegovina	PBSBiH	BHTV 1, BH Radio 1	All shows	Dejan Kukrić	
Bosnia and Herzegovina	RTVFBiH	FTV	Final	Dejan Kukrić	
Croatia	HRT	HRT 2	Semi-final		
Croatia	HRT	HRT 1	Final		
Cyprus	CyBC	RIK Ena	All shows		
Denmark	DR	DR1	All shows	Jørgen de Mylius	
Estonia	ETV		All shows	Marko Reikop	
Estonia	ER	Raadio 2	All shows	Mart Juur and Andrus Kivirähk	
Finland	YLE	YLE TV2	All shows	Markus Kajo and Asko Murtomäki	
Finland	YLE	YLE FST	All shows	Thomas Lundin	
Finland	YLE	YLE Radio Suomi	All shows	Sanna Kojo and Jorma Hietamäki	
Finland	YLE	YLE Radio Vega	All shows	Thomas Lundin	
Finland	YLE	YLE Radio Vega	Final	Hans Johansson	
France	France Télévisions	France 3	Final	Laurent Ruquier and Elsa Fayer	
France	Radio France	France Bleu	Final	Jean-Luc Delarue	
Germany	ARD	NDR Fernsehen	Semi-final	Peter Urban	
Germany	ARD	Das Erste	Final	Peter Urban	
Greece	ERT	NET	All shows		
Iceland	RÚV	Sjónvarpið, Rás 2	All shows	Gísli Marteinn Baldursson	
Ireland	RTÉ	N2	Semi-final	Marty Whelan	
Ireland	RTÉ	RTÉ One	Final	Marty Whelan	
Latvia	LTV		All shows	Kārlis Streips	
Lithuania	LRT	LTV	All shows	Darius Užkuraitis	
Malta	PBS	TVM	All shows	Eileen Montesin	
Monaco	TMC Monte Carlo		All shows	Bernard Montiel	
Netherlands	NOS	Nederland 2	All shows	Willem van Beusekom and Cornald Maas	
Netherlands	Radio 2		All shows	Hijlco Span and Ron Stoeltie	
Norway	NRK	NRK2 (Note: Deferred repeat broadcast on NRK1 at 23:40 (CEST))	Semi-final	Jostein Pedersen	
Norway	NRK	NRK1	Final	Jostein Pedersen	
Norway	NRK	NRK P1	Final		
Poland	TVP	TVP1	Final	Artur Orzech	
Portugal	RTP		All shows	Eládio Clímaco	
Romania	TVR	România 1	All shows		
Russia	Channel One (Note: Also broadcast deferred via the Orbita satellite broadcasting system in the Russian Far East)		Final		
Serbia and Montenegro	RTS	RTS 1	Semi-final		
Serbia and Montenegro	RTS	RTS 1	Final	Duška Vučinić-Lučić and Stanko Crnobrnja	
Slovenia	RTVSLO	SLO 2	Semi-final	Andrea F	
Slovenia	RTVSLO	SLO 1	Final	Andrea F	
Slovenia	RTVSLO		All shows	Jernej Vene	
Spain	TVE	La 2	Semi-final	Beatriz Pécker	
Spain	TVE	La Primera	Final	Beatriz Pécker	
Sweden	SVT	SVT1	All shows	Pekka Heino	
Sweden	SR	SR P4	All shows	Björn Kjellman and Carolina Norén	
Switzerland	SRG SSR	SF 2	Semi-final	Marco Fritsche	
Switzerland	SRG SSR	SF 1	Final	Sandra Studer	
Switzerland	SRG SSR	TSR 2	Semi-final	Jean-Marc Richard and Alain Morisod	
Switzerland	SRG SSR	TSR 1	Final	Jean-Marc Richard and Alain Morisod	
Switzerland	SRG SSR	TSI 1	All shows		
Turkey	TRT	TRT 1, TRT Int	All shows		
Ukraine	NTU	Pershyi Natsionalnyi	All shows	Rodion Pryntsevsky	
United Kingdom	BBC	BBC Three	Semi-final	Paddy O'Connell	
United Kingdom	BBC	BBC One, BBC Prime	Final	Terry Wogan	
United Kingdom	BBC	BBC Radio 2	Final	Ken Bruce	

Broadcasters and commentators in non-participating countries
Country	Broadcaster	Channel(s)	Show(s)	Commentator(s)	Ref(s)
Australia	SBS	SBS TV (Note: Deferred broadcast on 14 May (semi-final) and 16 May (final) at 19:30 (AEST))	All shows	Des Mangan	
Falkland Islands	BFBS	BFBS 1 (Note: Deferred broadcast at 21:00 (FKT))	Final	Terry Wogan	

== Incidents ==
Just before the Slovenian entry was about to be performed, the Turkish broadcaster accidentally took a commercial break which meant the Slovenian song was not heard by Turkish viewers. There were technical problems when in a short hiatus halfway through the songs used for the advertising break the hosts tried to contact various parties in Europe. They tried contacting Germany, Spain, and Turkey, but in the end were only able to get a response from Germany. During the Romanian postcard introduction, the information for the Romanian entry appeared on the screen, but was quickly taken away. A final minor hiccup occurred when, on her way to present the winner the trophy, Sertab Erener got her shoe stuck in a speaker grill by the side of the stage and had to be freed by stagehands. However this did not delay proceedings, and other than the above the show ran smoothly.

An hour after the semi-final had been aired, the European Broadcasting Union discovered that there had been problems with the vote counting in Monaco and Croatia. Digame, an affiliate of Deutsche Telekom, who had been responsible for processing all the votes (from 2004), reported that they had encountered problems with their calculation software, and there was a problem with text message voting in Croatia. When the votes were counted, results showed that Croatia had awarded themselves 4 points, which is against Eurovision rules. Later, an official EBU statement read that there had been technical problems at the side of the Croatian mobile service provider, who neglected to delete the illegal votes from the results. Consequently, some votes were not counted in the results announced at the end of the broadcast of the semi-final. When the results were corrected to include these additional votes, they were found not to have affected which countries had qualified for the final.

This year was also notable as it was the first year that Turkey voted for Cyprus and the second year in a row that Cyprus voted for Turkey. When the country presented its votes, no map of the island was shown, although all other countries' spokespersons were preceded with their country being highlighted on a map. This was widely attributed to Turkey's recognition of the northern half of the island as an independent republic, which is not recognised by any other country.

== Marcel Bezençon Awards ==
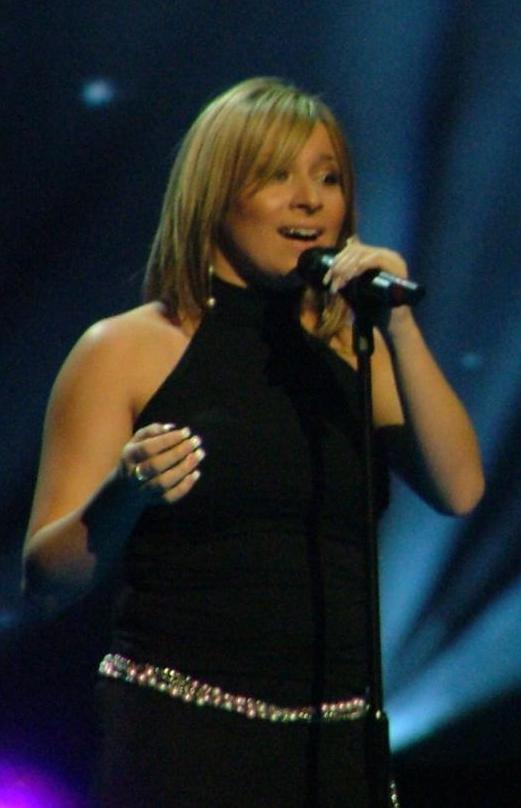
Lisa Andreas performing "Stronger Every Minute", the entry which won the inaugural Marcel Bezençon Awards' Composer Award

The Marcel Bezençon Awards, a series of awards held concurrently to the main contest, honour and celebrate the participants of the final of that year's Eurovision Song Contest. Named after one of the people influential in the creation of the contest, and created by two former Swedish Eurovision participants, Christer Björkman (1992) and Richard Herrey (1984 as a member of the winning group Herreys), the inaugural awards were presented at part of the 2002 event. Three awards were presented as part of the third edition of the awards in 2004, with the winner of each award determined by the collective votes of a different group of individuals. The Fan Award, which was presented in the previous two editions, was replaced by a Composer Award for the 2004 contest.

- The Press Award for the best competing song, as determined by the accredited press and media, was awarded to the entry from Serbia and Montenegro, "Lane moje" performed by Željko Joksimović and Ad Hoc Orchestra
- The Artistic Award for the best artistic performance, as determined by previous Eurovision winners, was awarded to the Ukrainian entry, "Wild Dances" performed by Ruslana
- The Composer Award for the best composition, as determined by the participating songwriters in the final, was awarded to the Cypriot entry, "Stronger Every Minute", written by Mike Connaris and performed by Lisa Andreas

The winners each received a hand-blown glass trophy designed by Karin Hammar and created at the Stockholm Glass Studio, which were handed out backstage prior to the contest proper.

== Official album ==
Cover art of the official album

Eurovision Song Contest: Istanbul 2004 was the official compilation album of the 2004 contest, put together by the European Broadcasting Union and released by EMI Records and CMC International on 26 April 2004. The album featured all 36 songs that entered in the 2004 contest, including the semi-finalists that failed to qualify into the grand final.

=== Charts ===
Chart (2004)	Peak position
German Compilation Albums (Offizielle Top 100)	3
