= Waterloo and Robinson =

Austrian musical duo

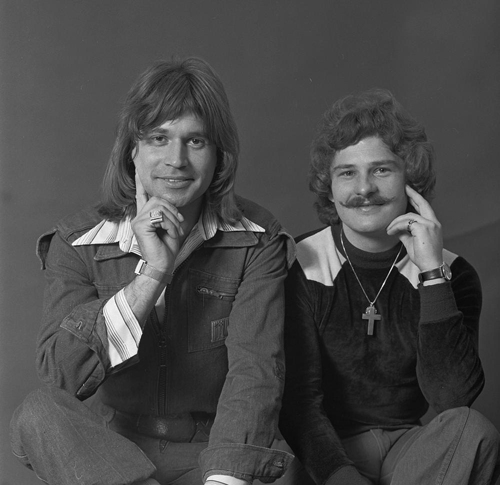
Waterloo and Robinson, 1976

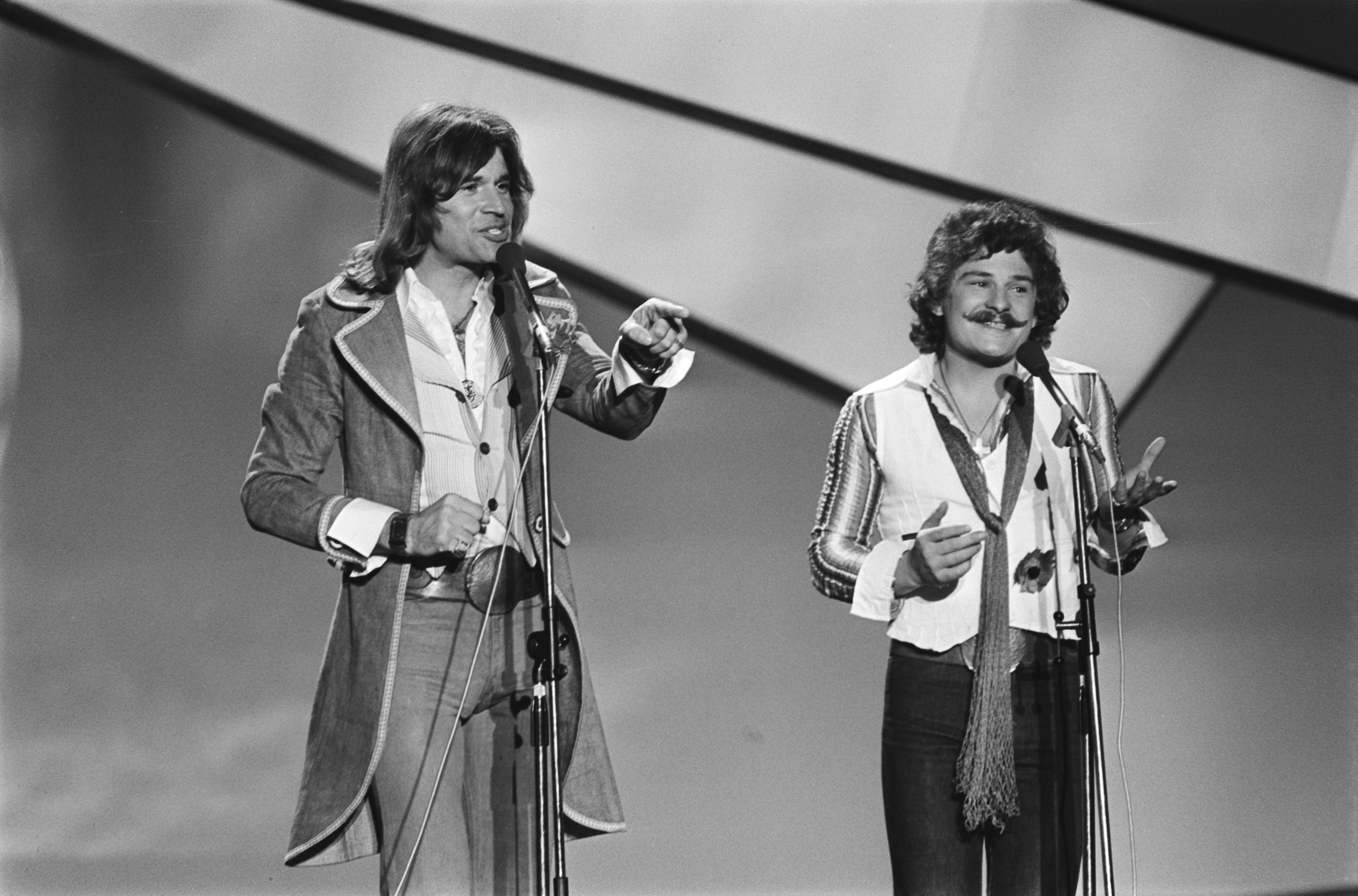
Waterloo and Robinson at the Eurovision Song Contest 1976

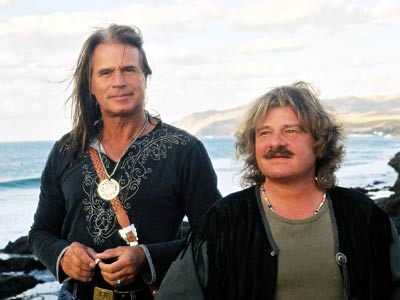
Waterloo and Robinson, 2003

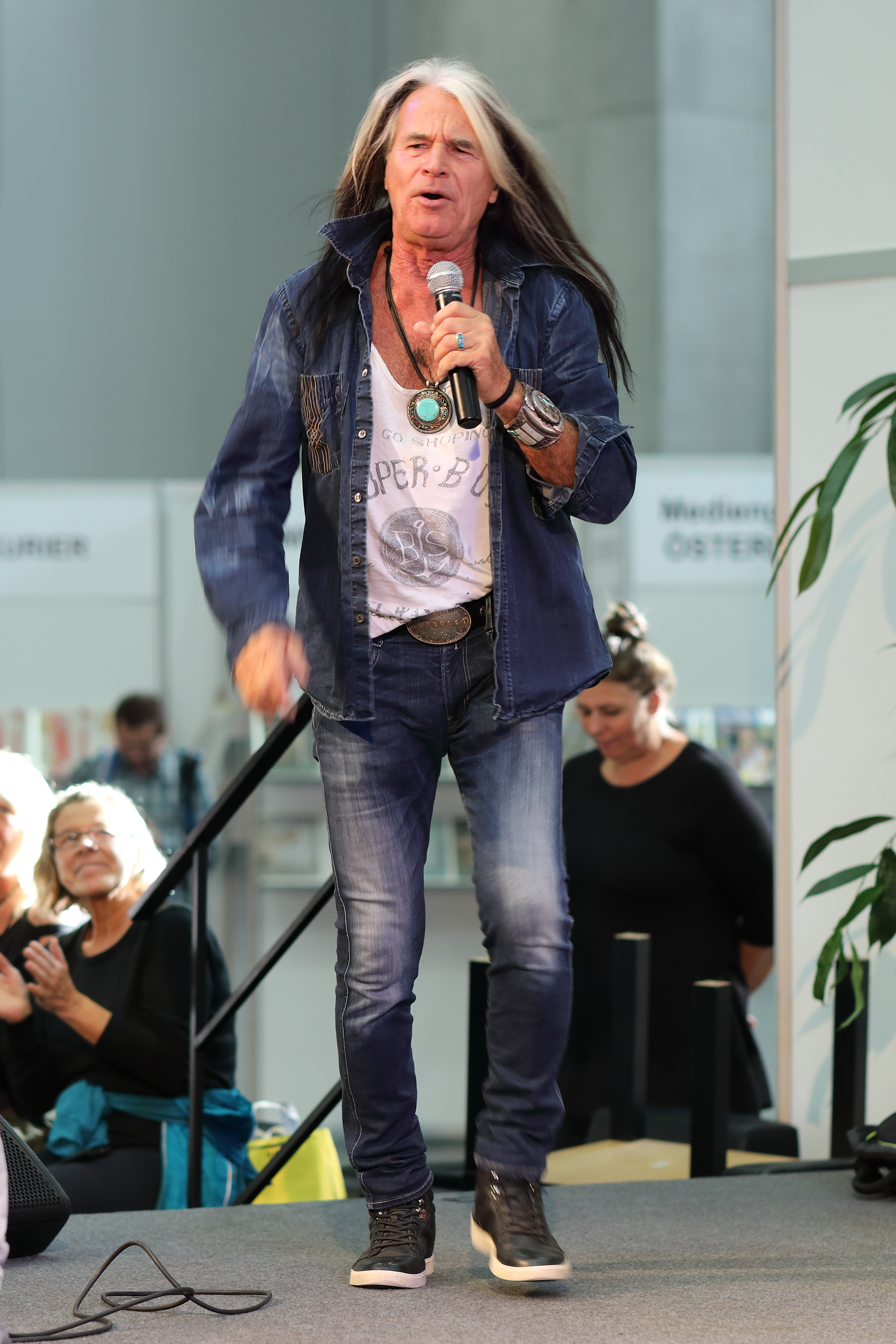
Waterloo, 2018

Waterloo and Robinson is an Austrian band, consisting of Johann Kreuzmayr ("Waterloo") and Josef Krassnitzer ("Robinson").

== Eurovision ==
The duo are most famous for representing Austria in the Eurovision Song Contest 1976, performing the song My Little World, where they recorded a 5th-place finish with 80 points. This song was also the first time that Austria had performed entirely in English at the Contest.

The duo entered the preselection to represent Austria at the 2004 contest, losing out to boyband Tie Break. This caused some controversy when Waterloo and Robinson protested that Tie Break's song ("Du bist") was longer than the 3 minutes allowed under Contest rules - clocking in at between 3:09 and 3:11 depending on the stereo used. The duo were quoted as saying "If skiers battle over the tenth part of a second, we must be allowed to go to court because of a time exceeding of 5%" as well as filing a legal challenge to Tie Break's performance . This challenge was not upheld.

== Discography ==
=== Albums ===
- 1974 – Sing my song
- 1975 - Please love me
- 1975 - Unsere Lieder
- 1976 - Songs
- 1976 - Clap your hands
- 1976 - The best of Waterloo & Robinson 1971 - 1976 (Double-LP)
- 1977 - Hollywood - The best of Waterloo & Robinson (just in Germany)
- 1977 - Successen (just in Netherlands)
- 1977 - Beautiful time
- 1977 - The Original
- 1977 - Weihnachten mit Waterloo & Robinson (Maxisingle)
- 1978 - Wild, wild land
- 1980 - Brand new start
- 1980 - Ich denke oft an...
- 1981 - Spiegelbilder
- 1982 - Unsere schönsten Lieder
- 1982 - Ihre 16 größten Erfolge
- 1988 - Poptakes
- 1992 - Weihnachten mit Waterloo & Robinson
- 1994 - Powertime
- 1995 - Private Collection
- 1998 – Master Series
- 1999 - Hollywood 2000
- 2002 - Marianne

=== Singles ===
- 1971 - Du kannst sehen
- 1972 - Sag´ woher wehst du Wind
- 1972 - Lili's Haus
- 1973 - Mamy & Dad
- 1973 - Sailor
- 1973 - Waterloo & Robinson Song
- 1974 - Baby Blue
- 1974 - Hollywood
- 1974 - Das war Hollywood von gestern
- 1974 - Midnight movie (just in Great Britain)
- 1975 - Old times again
- 1975 - Straßen der Nacht
- 1975 - Walk away
- 1975 - Geh zu ihr
- 1976 - My little world
- 1976 - Meine kleine Welt
- 1976 - Danke schön!
- 1976 - Sunday 16
- 1976 - My, my, my
- 1976 - Du bist frei
- 1977 - Hide away
- 1977 - Stille Nacht
- 1977 - Cadillac Cafe
- 1978 - Unser kleines Team
- 1978 - Im Garten Eden
- 1978 - Himmel, Donner, Arm und Zwirn
- 1978 - Chocolata
- 1978 - Bye, bye, bye little butterfly
- 1979 - Do you remember Marianne
- 1979 - Ich denk´ noch oft an Marianne
- 1979 - Sally, they're selling the army
- 1980 - Du, die verkaufen die Army
- 1980 - Eleonora
- 1981 - Frühstück in Berlin
- 1992 - Barcelona
- 1996 - Crema
- 1997 - Write on
- 1998 - Willkommen Österreich
- 2000 - 2gether we r strong (Waterloo & Robinson feat. Panah)
- 2000 - In der schönen Weihnachtszeit (Waterloo & Robinson & Kindergarten Walding)
- 2002 - Na Naa.Nanana Live is life
- 2003 - Marilyn
- 2004 - You can change the world

Preceded by Milestones	Austria in the Eurovision Song Contest; 1976	Succeeded by Schmetterlinge
