= Norway in the Eurovision Song Contest 2004 =

- Eurovision Song Contest 2004
- Participating broadcaster: Norsk rikskringkasting (NRK)
- Country: Norway
- Selection process: Melodi Grand Prix 2004
- Selection date: 6 March 2004

Competing entry
- Song: "High"
- Artist: Knut Anders Sørum
- Songwriters: Thomas Thörnholm; Lars Andersson; Danne Attlerud

Placement
- Final result: 24th, 3 points

Participation chronology

Norway was represented at the Eurovision Song Contest 2004 with the song "High", composed by Thomas Thörnholm and Lars Andersson, with lyrics by Danne Attlerud, and performed by Knut Anders Sørum. The Norwegian participating broadcaster, Norsk rikskringkasting (NRK), organised the national final Melodi Grand Prix 2004 in order to select its entry for the contest. Twelve entries competed in a show that took place on 6 March 2004 and the winner was determined over two rounds of public televoting. The top four entries in the first round of voting advanced to the competition's second round—the Gold Final. In the second round of public televoting, "High" performed by Knut Anders Sørum was selected as the winner with 82,427 votes.

As one of ten highest placed finishers in the 2003 contest, Norway directly qualified to compete in the final of the Eurovision Song Contest which took place on 15 May 2004. Performing in position 3, Norway placed twenty-fourth (last) out of the 24 participating countries with 3 points.

== Background ==
Prior to the 2003 contest, Norsk rikskringkasting (NRK) had participated in the Eurovision Song Contest representing Norway 42 times since its first entry in 1960. It had won the contest on two occasions: in 1985 with the song "La det swinge" performed by Bobbysocks!, and in 1995 with the song "Nocturne" performed by Secret Garden. It also had the two distinctions of having finished last in the Eurovision final more than any other country and for having the most nul points (zero points) in the contest, the latter being a record the nation shared together with Austria. The country had finished last nine times and had failed to score a point during four contests.

As part of its duties as participating broadcaster, NRK organises the selection of its entry in the Eurovision Song Contest and broadcasts the event in the country. The broadcaster confirmed its intentions to participate at the 2004 contest on 8 September 2003. The broadcaster has traditionally organised the national final Melodi Grand Prix to select its entry for the contest in all but one of its participation. Along with its participation confirmation, the broadcaster revealed details regarding its selection procedure and announced the organization of Melodi Grand Prix 2004 in order to select its 2004 entry.

== Before Eurovision ==
=== Melodi Grand Prix 2004 ===
Melodi Grand Prix 2004 was the 42nd edition of the Norwegian national final Melodi Grand Prix organised by NRK to select its entry for the Eurovision Song Contest 2004. The show took place on 6 March 2004 at the Oslo Spektrum in Oslo, hosted by Ivar Dyrhaug and televised on NRK1. The national final was watched by 1.228 million viewers in Norway with a market share of 75%.

==== Competing entries ====
A submission period was opened by NRK between 8 September 2003 and 1 October 2003. Songwriters of any nationality were allowed to submit entries, while performers of the selected songs would be chosen by NRK in consultation with the songwriters. In addition to the public call for submissions, NRK reserved the right to directly invite certain artists and composers to compete. At the close of the deadline, 521 submissions were received. Twelve songs were selected for the competition and the competing acts and songs were revealed on 13 February 2004 during a press conference at NRK studios.

Artist	Song	Songwriter(s)
Arlene Wilkes	"This Is Where You Got It From"	Torbjörn Wassenius, Claes Andreasson
Aslak J. Johnsen	"I Don't Understand Her"	Aslak J. Johnsen, Benjamin Sletten, Anders Bjørknes
Christian Hovda	"Crying"	Arne Hovda, Per Kristian Ottestad
Dilsa	"What Do You Think I Am"	Dilsa Calimi, Kim Bergseth, Tristan de la Villier
Ja-Da	"Mr. Brown"	Ivan Jonas, Maxim Popov
Knut Anders Sørum	"High"	Thomas Thörnholm, Lars Andersson, Danne Attlerud
Lisa Marie Strandengen	"I Knock on Wood"	Åsmund Ruud, Glenn Gulli
Malin Schavenius	"Sunshine"	Michael Lundh, Quint Starkie, Anna Sahlin
Maria Moe	"The Way I Feel"	Maria Moe, Kyrre Fritzner
Rebecca	"1000 and One Nights"	David Clewett, Ivar Lisinski, Yak Bondy
Svein Lindland	"See the World"	Dag Lauvland
Wig Wam	"Crazy Things"	Wig Wam

==== Final ====
Twelve songs competed during the final on 6 March 2004. The winner was selected over two rounds of public televoting. In the first round, voting was held from 1 March 2004 and the results were divided into Norway's five regions with each region distributing points as follows: 1–8, 10 and 12 points. The top four entries were selected to proceed to the second round, the Gold Final, where the results of the public televote were revealed by Norway's five regions based on their actual voting figures and led to the victory of "High" performed by Knut Anders Sørum with 82,427 votes.

Final – 6 March 2004
R/O	Artist	Song	Western Norway	Northern Norway	Southern Norway	Central Norway	Eastern Norway	Total	Place
1	Aslak J. Johnsen	"I Don't Understand Her"	5	4	4	5	1	19	7
2	Maria Moe	"The Way I Feel"	2	2	1	3	2	10	10
3	Wig Wam	"Crazy Things"	6	6	7	7	8	34	4
4	Ja-Da	"Mr. Brown"	12	5	5	6	3	31	5
5	Rebecca	"1000 and One Nights"	7	7	8	12	7	41	3
6	Christian Hovda	"Crying"						0	11
7	Dilsa	"What Do You Think I Am"	3	3	3	1	6	16	8
8	Svein Lindland	"See the World"	4	12	6	4	4	30	6
9	Malin Schavenius	"Sunshine"						0	11
10	Knut Anders Sørum	"High"	10	8	12	8	12	50	1
11	Lisa Marie Strandengen	"I Knock on Wood"	1	1	2	2	5	11	9
12	Arlene Wilkes	"This Is Where You Got It From"	8	10	10	10	10	48	2

Gold Final – 6 March 2004
R/O	Artist	Song	Western Norway	Northern Norway	Southern Norway	Central Norway	Eastern Norway	Total	Place
1	Wig Wam	"Crazy Things"	5,498	8,043	7,867	6,452	21,060	48,920	3
2	Rebecca	"1000 and One Nights"	5,073	9,654	7,208	8,309	16,431	46,675	4
3	Knut Anders Sørum	"High"	7,295	13,273	11,914	8,080	41,865	82,427	1
4	Arlene Wilkes	"This Is Where You Got It From"	4,701	9,137	8,349	5,691	28,403	56,281	2

== At Eurovision ==
It was announced that the competition's format would be expanded to include a semi-final in 2004. According to the rules, all nations with the exceptions of the host country, the "Big Four" (France, Germany, Spain and the United Kingdom) and the ten highest placed finishers in the 2003 contest are required to qualify from the semi-final in order to compete for the final; the top ten countries from the semi-final progress to the final. As Norway finished fourth in the 2003 contest, the nation automatically qualified to compete in the final on 15 May 2004. On 23 March 2004, a special allocation draw was held which determined the running order and Norway was set to perform in position 3 in the final, following the entry from Austria and before the entry from France. Norway placed twenty-fourth (last) in the final, scoring 3 points. This was the tenth time Norway finished last in the final.

In Norway, the semi-final was broadcast on NRK2 and the final was broadcast on NRK1. Both shows featured commentary by Jostein Pedersen. NRK1 also broadcast the semi-final on a two hour and 40 minute delay, while the final was also broadcast via radio on NRK P1. NRK appointed Ingvild Helljesen as its spokesperson to announce the Norwegian votes during the final.

=== Voting ===
Below is a breakdown of points awarded to Norway and awarded by Norway in the semi-final and grand final of the contest. The nation awarded its 12 points to Bosnia and Herzegovina in the semi-final and to Sweden in the final of the contest.

Following the release of the televoting figures by the EBU after the conclusion of the competition, it was revealed that a total of 100,217 televotes were cast in Norway during the two shows: 18,939 votes during the semi-final and 81,278 votes during the final.

==== Points awarded to Norway ====
Points awarded to Norway (Final)
Score	Country
12 points	
10 points	
8 points	
7 points	
6 points	
5 points	
4 points	
3 points	Sweden
2 points	
1 point	

==== Points awarded by Norway ====
Points awarded by Norway (Semi-final)
Score	Country
12 points	Bosnia and Herzegovina
10 points	Serbia and Montenegro
8 points	Albania
7 points	Ukraine
6 points	Denmark
5 points	Greece
4 points	Cyprus
3 points	Finland
2 points	Netherlands
1 point	Estonia

Points awarded by Norway (Final)
Score	Country
12 points	Sweden
10 points	Bosnia and Herzegovina
8 points	Turkey
7 points	Ukraine
6 points	Serbia and Montenegro
5 points	Iceland
4 points	Cyprus
3 points	Albania
2 points	Greece
1 point	Germany
