= Tam Zamanı Şimdi =

Studio album by Athena
- Released: April 2000
- Genre: Ska punk, ska
- Label: Universal Music

Athena chronology
Holigan (1998)	Tam Zamanı Şimdi (2000)	Herşey Yolunda (2002)

Tam Zamanı Şimdi (Now is the Perfect Time) is the second studio album by Turkish ska punk rock group Athena, released in April 2000.

In 2001, the band composed the song Oniki dev adam for supporting the Turkey national basketball team in the EuroBasket 2001.

On 18 August 2005, the song "Tam Zamanı Şimdi" was included in the FIFA 06 videogame.

== Track listing ==
Lyrics for all songs are in the Turkish language.

=== Compact disc version ===
1. Her Şey Güzel Olacak
2. Yaşamak Var Ya
3. Aşk Meşk Yok
4. Macera
5. Sonrası Yoktu
6. Tam Zamanı Şimdi (Now is the perfect time)
7. İki Lafa Düştün Ortaya
8. Palavra
9. Rüya
10. Dön Baba Dönelim
11. Aşk Meşk Yok (alternative version)
12. On İki Dev Adam (Twelve giant men) (on the 2001 reissue)
