= Ozan Musluoğlu =

Turkish musician (born 1977)

Ozan Musluoglu
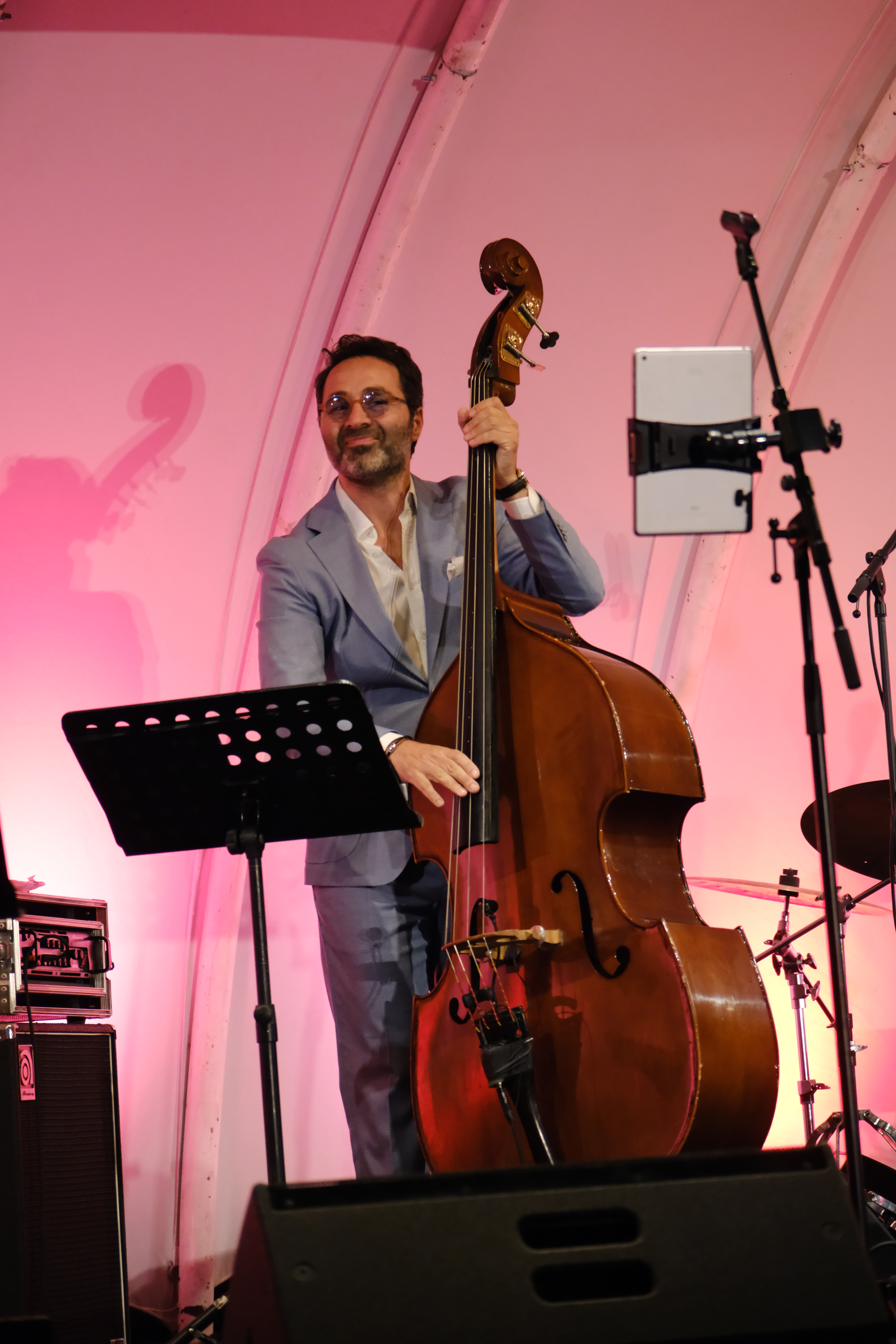
- Musluoğlu at Istanbul Jazz Festival 2025

Background information
- Born: June 11, 1977
- Origin: Istanbul, Turkey
- Genres: Jazz
- Occupations: Double bassist, Composer
- Instruments: Double bass, Electric bass
- Years active: 1993-present
- Labels: Rec Jazz, Equinox Music
- Website: Ozan Musluoglu

Ozan Musluoğlu is a Turkish musician best known as a former member of the Turkish ska-punk band Athena.

Musluoğlu was born in Germany in 1977 and started playing bass guitar at the age of 16. In 2000, he won a full scholarship to the Bilgi University Music Department, and in 2001, he started his studies with Volkan Hursever, James Lewis, and Kursat And.

He has since then shared the stage with Kerem Gorsev, Vanessa Rubin, Danny Grissett, Dena Derose, Allan Harris, Tuna Otenel, Imer Demirer, Donovan Mixon, Erkan Ogur and Neset Ruacan. He has done workshops with very well known bassists as Marc Johnson, David Friesen, Dominique Lemerie and Robert Balzar. He had the opportunity to play with some musicians like Marcus Miller, Roy Hargrove, Mike Stern, Willy Jones, Eric Reed, Erik Smith, Katy Roberts, Leslie Harrison, Bebel Gilberto, Ilhan Ersahin, EJ Strickland, George Colligan and Bernard Maury in various jam sessions and club dates.

Also, as bassist of the group Athena from 2003–2008, he recorded albums and toured nationally and internationally, including representing Turkey in the 2004 Eurovision Song Contest where they placed 4th.

In January 2009, Ozan Musluoglu enthusiastically released his first album under the Recbyjazz label. In addition to 6 of his own compositions, he included Antonio Carlos Jobim's, “Ligia” in this project. Ozan Musluoglu played bass on the album, with Engin Recepogulları on saxophone, Ulkem Özsezen on piano and Ferit Odman on drums. Turkey's leading trumpet player, Imer Demirer, was a special guest on 2 of the songs.

In February 2009, Ozan finished recording his 2nd album of his original compositions. The musicians in this album are: Jeremy Pelt, voted rising star on the trumpet 5 years in a row by Down Beat Magazine; JD Allen on saxophone, Danny Grissett on piano and Darrell Green on drums.

Currently, Musluoğlu is the bass player for the TRT jazz orchestra led by Neşet Ruacan. At the same time, he produces and presents the weekly jazz radio program titled “Caz Saati” on the national radio TRT every Monday at 11 pm.

== Albums ==
- 2009 "Coincidence"
- 2011 "40th Day"
- 2012 "My Best Friends Are Pianists"
- 2015 "My Best Friends Are Vocalists"

== Discography ==
2001 Bodrum Jazz Festival

2002 & 2003 Afyonkarahisar Jazz Festival

2003 Istanbul Jazz Festival

2003 Akbank Jazz Days

2004 Baku Jazz Festival

2006 Bratislava Jazz Festival

2008 Alanya Jazz Festival

2010 Istanbul Jazz Festival

2010 Ramadan Jazz Festival

2011 Nublu Jazz Festival

2011 Istanbul Jazz Festival
