= Germany in the Eurovision Song Contest 2004 =

- Eurovision Song Contest 2004
- Participating broadcaster: ARD (Note: Arbeitsgemeinschaft der öffentlich-rechtlichen Rundfunkanstalten der Bundesrepublik Deutschland) – Norddeutscher Rundfunk (NDR)
- Country: Germany
- Selection process: Germany 12 Points!
- Selection date: 19 March 2004

Competing entry
- Song: "Can't Wait Until Tonight"
- Artist: Max
- Songwriters: Stefan Raab

Placement
- Final result: 8th, 93 points

Participation chronology

Germany was represented at the Eurovision Song Contest 2004 with the song "Can't Wait Until Tonight", written by Stefan Raab, and performed by Max. The German participating broadcaster on behalf of ARD, Norddeutscher Rundfunk (NDR), organised the national final Germany 12 Points! in order to select their entry for the contest. The national final took place on 19 March 2004 and featured ten competing acts with the winner being selected through two rounds of public televoting. "Can't Wait Until Tonight" performed by Max was selected as the German entry after placing first in the top two during the first round of voting and ultimately gaining 853,688 votes in the second round.

As a member of the "Big Four", Germany automatically qualified to compete in the final of the Eurovision Song Contest. Performing in position 8, Germany placed eighth out of the 24 participating countries with 93 points.

== Background ==
Prior to the 2004 Contest, ARD had participated in the Eurovision Song Contest representing Germany forty-six times since its debut in 1956. It has won the contest on one occasion: in 1982 with the song "Ein bißchen Frieden" performed by Nicole. Germany, to this point, has been noted for having appeared in the contest more than any other country; they have competed in every contest since the first edition in 1956 except for 1996 when it was eliminated in a pre-contest elimination round. In 2003, the German entry "Let's Get Happy" performed by Lou placed eleventh out of twenty-six competing songs scoring 53 points.

As part of its duties as participating broadcaster, ARD organises the selection of its entry in the Eurovision Song Contest and broadcasts the event in the country. Since 1996, ARD had delegated the participation in the contest to its member Norddeutscher Rundfunk (NDR). NDR confirmed its participation in the 2004 contest on 19 May 2003. Since 1996, NDR had set up national finals with several artists to choose both the song and performer to compete at Eurovision for Germany. On 26 September 2003, the broadcaster also announced that they would organise a multi-artist national final in cooperation with private music channel VIVA to select the entry, with the goal of finding songs that have international hit potential instead of those "which do not stand a chance to chart in Germany or abroad and which rather burdened the image of the Eurovision Song Contest in the past."

== Before Eurovision ==
=== Germany 12 Points! ===
The logo of Germany 12 Points!

Germany 12 Points! was the competition organised by NDR to select its entry for the Eurovision Song Contest 2004. The competition took place on 19 March 2004 at the Treptow Arena in Berlin, hosted by Sarah Kuttner and Jörg Pilawa. Ten acts competed during the show with the winner being selected through a public televote. The show was broadcast on Das Erste as well as online via the broadcaster's Eurovision Song Contest website eurovision.de. The national final was watched by 5.71 million viewers in Germany with a market share of 18%.

==== Competing entries ====
Eight acts were selected by a panel consisting of representatives of the music channel VIVA from proposals received by NDR from record companies. The eight competing artists were announced between 25 November 2003 and 21 January 2004, and each of the artists were required to submit a professional music video for their entry to be presented on the VIVA programme Euroclash starting from 12 January 2004. An additional two acts were later selected by NDR as wildcards due to their top 40 placement in the German singles charts in early 2004: Max Mutzke (winner of the talent show SSDSGPS) and Tina Frank. Singer Masha was originally announced to have been awarded a wildcard for the competition, but she ultimately did not participate as her entry "Right Here" failed to enter the top 40 of the German singles charts before the show.

==== Final ====
The televised final took place on 19 March 2004. The winner was selected through two rounds of public televoting, including options for landline and SMS voting. In the first round of voting, the top two entries were selected to proceed to the second round. In the second round, the winner, "Can't Wait Until Tonight" performed by Max, was selected. In addition to the performances of the competing entries, Turkish singer Mustafa Sandal performed his song "Araba", while the German group Rosenstolz performed their song "Liebe ist alles" and the Australian music ensemble The Ten Tenors performed a medley of songs written by Ralph Siegel, who had previously composed 17 Eurovision entries for various countries. 927,418 votes were cast in the second round: 766,615 via landline and 154,863 via SMS.

First Round – 19 March 2004
| R/O | Artist | Song | Songwriter(s) | Televote | Place |
|---|---|---|---|---|---|
| 1 | Patrick Nuo | "Undone" | David Jost, Dave Roth | — | — |
| 2 | MIA. | "Hungriges Herz" | Gunnar Spies, Mieze Katz | — | — |
| 3 | Sabrina Setlur | "Liebe" | Moses Pelham, Martin Haas, Sabrina Setlur | — | — |
| 4 | Overground | "Der letzte Stern" | Mike Michaels, Mark Dollar, Mark Tabak, Aldjoumma Sissoko | — | 3 |
| 5 | Tina Frank | "Ich schenk' dir mein Herz" | Jörn Christof Heilbut, Robert Schulte Hemming, Jens Langbein | — | — |
| 6 | Max | "Can't Wait Until Tonight" | Stefan Raab | 67% | 1 |
| 7 | WestBam feat. Afrika Islam | "Dancing With the Rebels" | Maximilian Lenz, Charles Glenn, Klaus Jankuhn | — | — |
| 8 | Laith Al-Deen | "Höher" | Laith Al-Deen, Götz von Sydow, Matthias Hoffmann | — | — |
| 9 | Wonderwall | "Silent Tears" | Kathrin Schauer, Daniela Förstel | — | 4 |
| 10 | Scooter | "Jigga Jigga!" | H.P. Baxxter, Rick J. Jordan, Jay Frog, Jens Thele | 7% | 2 |

Second Round – 19 March 2004
| R/O | Artist | Song | Televote | Place |
|---|---|---|---|---|
| 1 | Max | "Can't Wait Until Tonight" | 853,688 | 1 |
| 2 | Scooter | "Jigga Jigga!" | 73,730 | 2 |

=== Controversy ===
Following the German national final, show host Sarah Kuttner stated that she and her co-host Jörg Pilawa did not get along very well as he had taken over some of her lines without telling her, which led to confusion during the live broadcast. Pilawa could also be seen doing faces when Kuttner announced contestant Tina Frank. Later during a green room scene, Kuttner ironically stated "When I am older, I will marry Jörg Pilawa. Jörg, I love you from the bottom of my heart." She was also criticised for using the German words for "crap" and "shit" during the live broadcast, which usually does not happen on a public channel.

=== Chart release and success ===
Like every year since 1996, a compilation CD with all entries was released. The CD also included the song "Right Here" by Masha, which was one of the eligible entries for the national final but ultimately was not selected as it failed to reach the German Top 40 single charts, as well as the winning song of the 2003 Eurovision Song Contest "Everyway That I Can" by Sertab Erener.

For the first time ever, all songs in the CD managed to reach the German singles charts, with some also making it to the singles charts in Austria and Switzerland. Max became one of four German representatives to top the singles charts since Nicole in 1982, while national final runner-up "Jigga Jigga!" by Scooter reached the singles charts in Norway (#10), Finland (#21), Sweden (#24), Ireland (#34), the United Kingdom (#48) and the Netherlands (#50).

| Song | Germany | Austria | Switzerland |
|---|---|---|---|
| "Undone" | 30 | — | 30 |
| "Hungriges Herz" | 24 | 58 | — |
| "Liebe" | 52 | — | — |
| "Der letzte Stern" | 9 | 30 | 27 |
| "Ich schenk' dir mein Herz" | 98 | — | — |
| "Can't Wait Until Tonight" | 1 | 2 | 4 |
| "Dancing With the Rebels" | 69 | — | — |
| "Höher" | 81 | — | — |
| "Silent Tears" | 90 | — | — |
| "Jigga Jigga!" | 10 | 9 | 45 |

== At Eurovision ==
According to Eurovision rules, all nations with the exceptions of the host country and the "Big Four" (France, Germany, Spain and the United Kingdom) are required to qualify from the semi-final in order to compete for the final; the top ten countries from the semi-final progress to the final. As a member of the "Big Four", Germany automatically qualified to compete in the final on 15 May 2004. In addition to their participation in the final, Germany is also required to broadcast and vote in the semi-final. The running order for the final in addition to the semi-final was decided through an allocation draw and Germany was subsequently drawn to perform in position 8, following the entry from the Netherlands and before the entry from Albania. Max performed his song in English and Turkish during the final performance, and Germany placed eighth in the final scoring 93 points.

In Germany, the two shows were broadcast on Das Erste which featured commentary by Peter Urban, as well as on Deutschlandfunk and NDR 2 which featured commentary by Thomas Mohr. The show was watched by 11.49 million viewers in Germany, which meant a market share of 44 per cent. NDR appointed Thomas Anders as its spokesperson to announce the top 12-point score awarded by the German televote during the final.

=== Voting ===
Below is a breakdown of points awarded to Germany and awarded by Germany in the semi-final and grand final of the contest, and the breakdown of the voting conducted during the two shows. Germany awarded its 12 points to Serbia and Montenegro in the semi-final and to Turkey in the grand final of the contest.

Following the release of the televoting figures by the EBU after the conclusion of the competition, it was revealed that a total of 1,169,210 televotes were cast in Germany during the two shows: 108,161 votes during the semi-final and 1,061,049 votes during the final.

==== Points awarded to Germany ====
Points awarded to Germany (Final)
| Score | Country |
|---|---|
| 12 points | Spain |
| 10 points | Austria; Switzerland |
| 8 points | Portugal |
| 7 points | France; Monaco |
| 6 points | Poland |
| 5 points | Turkey |
| 4 points | Ireland; Romania; United Kingdom |
| 3 points | Bosnia and Herzegovina; Netherlands; Slovenia |
| 2 points | Albania; Estonia |
| 1 point | Croatia; Lithuania; Norway |

==== Points awarded by Germany ====
Points awarded by Germany (Semi-final)
| Score | Country |
|---|---|
| 12 points | Serbia and Montenegro |
| 10 points | Greece |
| 8 points | Albania |
| 7 points | Bosnia and Herzegovina |
| 6 points | Ukraine |
| 5 points | Croatia |
| 4 points | Cyprus |
| 3 points | Macedonia |
| 2 points | Netherlands |
| 1 point | Israel |

Points awarded by Germany (Final)
| Score | Country |
|---|---|
| 12 points | Turkey |
| 10 points | Serbia and Montenegro |
| 8 points | Cyprus |
| 7 points | Greece |
| 6 points | Ukraine |
| 5 points | Albania |
| 4 points | Poland |
| 3 points | Sweden |
| 2 points | Spain |
| 1 point | Croatia |
