= Austria in the Eurovision Song Contest 2004 =

- Eurovision Song Contest 2004
- Participating broadcaster: Österreichischer Rundfunk (ORF)
- Country: Austria
- Selection process: Song.Null.Vier
- Selection date: 5 March 2004

Competing entry
- Song: "Du bist"
- Artist: Tie Break
- Songwriters: Peter Zimmermann

Placement
- Final result: 21st, 9 points

Participation chronology

Austria was represented at the Eurovision Song Contest 2004 with the song "Du bist", written by Peter Zimmermann, and performed by the group Tie Break. The Austrian participating broadcaster, Österreichischer Rundfunk (ORF), organised the national final Song.Null.Vier in order to select its entry for the contest. Ten songs competed in a televised show where a public vote exclusively selected "Du bist" performed by Tie Break as the winner.

As one of ten highest placed finishers in the 2003 contest, Austria directly qualified to compete in the final of the Eurovision Song Contest which took place on 15 May 2004. Performing in position 2, Austria placed twenty-first out of the 24 participating countries with 9 points.

== Background ==
Prior to the 2004 contest, Österreichischer Rundfunk (ORF) has participated in the Eurovision Song Contest representing Austria forty times since its first entry in 1957. It has won the contest on one occasion: in 1966 with the song "Merci, Chérie" performed by Udo Jürgens. Its least successful result has been last place, achieved on seven occasions, most recently in 1991. It has also received nul points on three occasions; in 1962, in 1988, and in 1991.

As part of its duties as participating broadcaster, ORF organises the selection of its entry in the Eurovision Song Contest and broadcasts the event in the country. The broadcaster confirmed its intentions to participate at the 2004 contest on 7 October 2003. From 1995 to 2000, ORF has held an internal selection to choose the artist and song, while the broadcaster had set up national finals with several artists to choose both the song and performer in 2002 and 2003. Along with its participation confirmation, the broadcaster also announced that its entry for the 2004 contest would be selected through a national final.

== Before Eurovision ==
=== Song.Null.Vier ===
Song.Null.Vier (Song.Zero.Four) was the national final organised by ORF to select its entry for the Eurovision Song Contest 2004. The competition took place on 5 March 2004 at the ORF Center in Vienna, hosted by Boris Uran and Oliver Auspitz and broadcast on ORF eins. The first part of the national final was watched by 614,000 viewers in Austria, while the second part was watched by 600,000 viewers in Austria.

==== Competing entries ====
Nine artists were nominated by record companies, while a tenth act was chosen through a wildcard selection. For the wildcard selection, ORF invited all interested artists to submit their songs to the broadcaster between 10 December 2003 and 2 February 2004, with the received submissions being reviewed by a team of music professionals. The nine nominated artists and songs were revealed on 9 February 2004, while the song "Sexuality" performed by André Leherb was revealed on 19 February 2004 as the winner of the wildcard selection. Among the competing artists was former Austrian Eurovision representative Waterloo and Robinson which represented Austria in 1976.

| Artist | Song | Songwriter(s) |
|---|---|---|
| 5 in Love | "Rich White Man" | Paul Kreshka |
| André Leherb | "Sexuality" | Johann Hölzel, Ronnie Urini |
| Daniel Djuric | "Millionaire" | Aleksandar Perišić, Ina Wolf |
| Elnaz | "Hold Me" | Georg Peter, Elnaz |
| Ide | "Link Love!" | Ide Hintze |
| Mizan | "My Istanbul" | Can Isik, Andreas Jud, Thomas Bürgin |
| Rob Davis | "Good to See You!" | Thomas Krampl, Rob Davis |
| Tie Break | "Du bist" | Peter Zimmermann |
| Waterloo and Robinson | "You Can Change the World" | Peter Janda |
| Zabine | "Shine On" | Alfred Jaklitsch |

==== Final ====
The televised final took place on 5 March 2004. Ten songs competed and public televoting exclusively selected "Du bist" performed by Tie Break as the winner.

Final – 5 March 2004
| R/O | Artist | Song | Televote | Place |
|---|---|---|---|---|
| 1 | Daniel Djuric | "Millionaire" | 20,394 | 6 |
| 2 | Zabine | "Shine On" | 13,840 | 7 |
| 3 | Mizan | "My Istanbul" | 2,776 | 10 |
| 4 | Rob Davis | "Good to See You!" | 22,389 | 5 |
| 5 | 5 in Love | "Rich White Man" | 26,490 | 4 |
| 6 | Waterloo and Robinson | "You Can Change the World" | 54,901 | 2 |
| 7 | André Leherb | "Sexuality" | 5,119 | 9 |
| 8 | Elnaz | "Hold Me" | 8,974 | 8 |
| 9 | Ide | "Link Love!" | 26,917 | 3 |
| 10 | Tie Break | "Du bist" | 82,203 | 1 |

=== Controversy ===
Following the national final, runners-up Waterloo and Robinson filed a lawsuit against Tie Break claiming that "Du bist" exceeded three minutes in length and had plagiarised the song "Für dich" by German singer Yvonne Catterfield. The lawsuit was subsequently rejected on formal legal grounds, while ORF issued a statement in response that "The minimal exceedance of the time limit [...] is no reason for disqualification" and that the song would be reduced to three minutes at the Eurovision Song Contest.

== At Eurovision ==
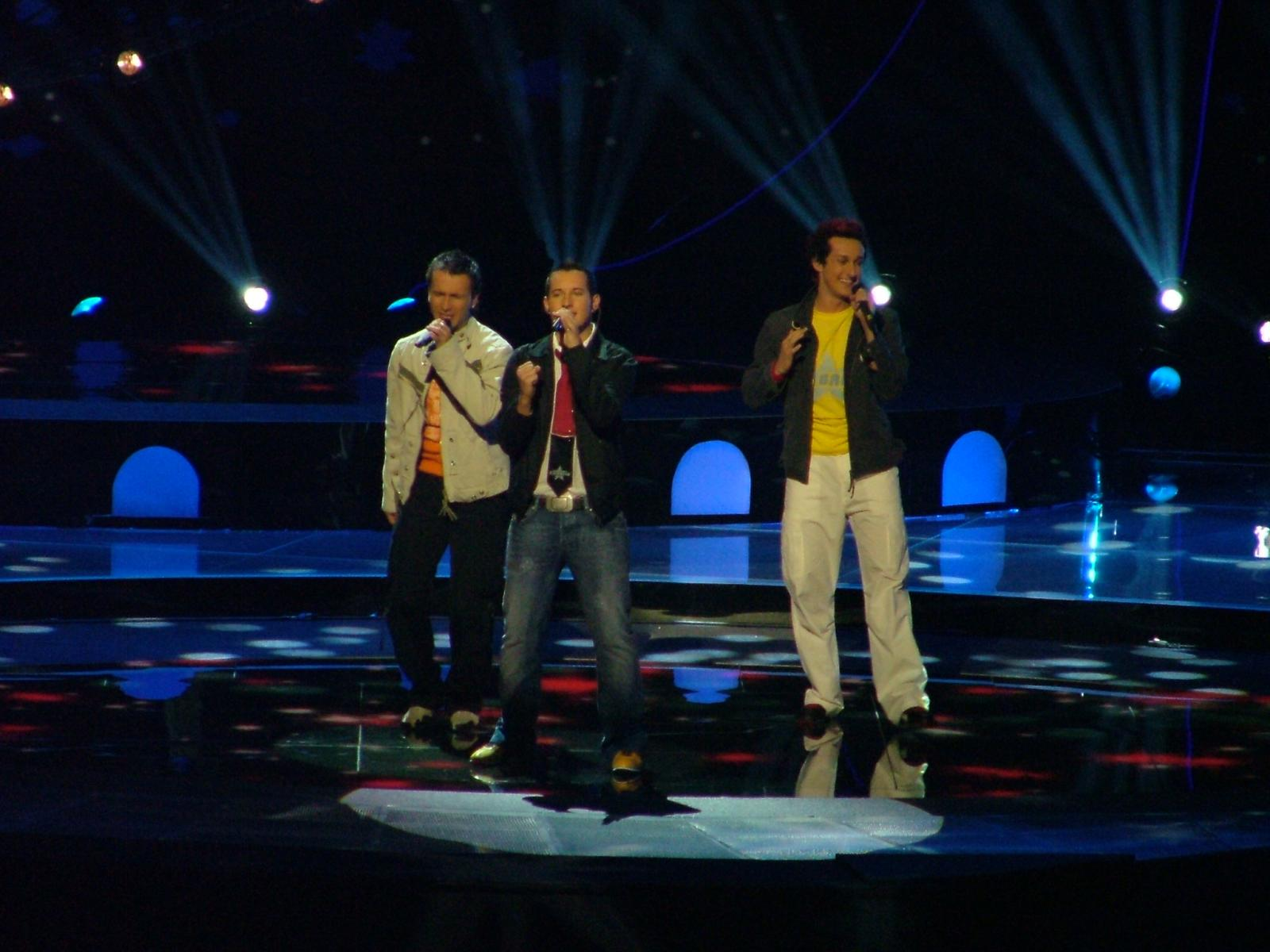
Tie Break during a rehearsal before the final

It was announced that the competition's format would be expanded to include a semi-final in 2004. According to the rules, all nations with the exceptions of the host country, the "Big Four" (France, Germany, Spain, and the United Kingdom) and the ten highest placed finishers in the 2003 contest are required to qualify from the semi-final in order to compete for the final; the top ten countries from the semi-final progress to the final. As Austria finished sixth in the 2003 contest, the nation automatically qualified to compete in the final on 15 May 2004. On 23 March 2004, an allocation draw was held which determined the running order and Austria was set to perform in position 2 in the final, following the entry from Spain and before the entry from Norway. Austria placed twenty-first in the final, scoring 9 points.

The semi-final and the final were broadcast in Austria on ORF eins with commentary by Andi Knoll. ORF appointed Dodo Roscic as its spokesperson to announce the results of the Austrian televote during the final.

=== Voting ===
Below is a breakdown of points awarded to Austria and awarded by Austria in the semi-final and grand final of the contest. The nation awarded its 12 points to Serbia and Montenegro in the semi-final and the final of the contest. Following the release of the televoting figures by the EBU after the conclusion of the competition, it was revealed that a total of 372,021 televotes were cast in Austria during the two shows: 87,119 votes during the semi-final and 284,902 votes during the final.

==== Points awarded to Austria ====
Points awarded to Austria (Final)
| Score | Country |
|---|---|
| 12 points | |
| 10 points | |
| 8 points | |
| 7 points | |
| 6 points | |
| 5 points | Greece |
| 4 points | France |
| 3 points | |
| 2 points | |
| 1 point | |

==== Points awarded by Austria ====
Points awarded by Austria (Semi-final)
| Score | Country |
|---|---|
| 12 points | Serbia and Montenegro |
| 10 points | Bosnia and Herzegovina |
| 8 points | Croatia |
| 7 points | Albania |
| 6 points | Cyprus |
| 5 points | Greece |
| 4 points | Ukraine |
| 3 points | Netherlands |
| 2 points | Macedonia |
| 1 point | Israel |

Points awarded by Austria (Final)
| Score | Country |
|---|---|
| 12 points | Serbia and Montenegro |
| 10 points | Germany |
| 8 points | Turkey |
| 7 points | Bosnia and Herzegovina |
| 6 points | Cyprus |
| 5 points | Albania |
| 4 points | Ukraine |
| 3 points | Croatia |
| 2 points | Greece |
| 1 point | Sweden |
