= Fire of Anatolia =

Turkish dance group

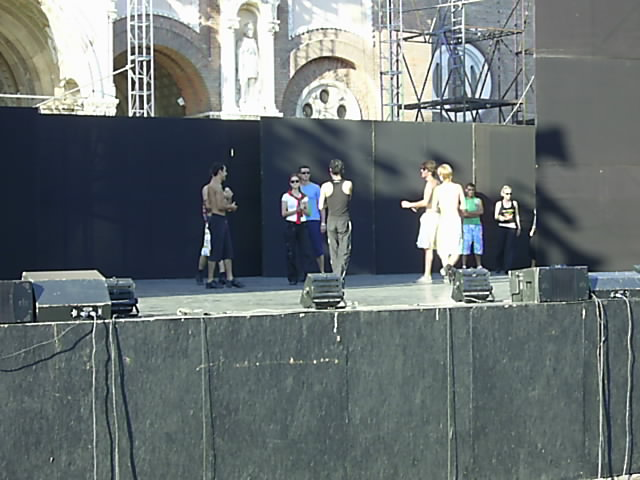
Fire of Anatolia rehearsal in Szeged, Hungary. 2 August 2007.

The Fire of Anatolia or Anadolu Ateşi is a Turkish dance group consisting of 120 dancers, several choreographers and other technical staff. The group has performed in more than 85 countries from the United States to China and Japan, in front of an audience of approximately 20 million people altogether. Fire of Anatolia holds two Guinness records, one for fastest dance performance with 241 steps per minute and another for largest audience, 400,000 people in Ereğli, in the Black Sea Region of the country. On 9 February 2013, Fire of Anatolia performed at the CCTV New Year's Gala. The head of the group is Mustafa Erdoğan.

== History ==
The concept of a large dance group performing Anatolian dances mixed with modern dance and ballet was a long desired dream of Mustafa Erdoğan, who conducted folk dance studies at Bilkent University. In 1999 he established the foundations of the group then called Sultans of the Dance. There were advertisements published in local newspapers in search of dancers. Out of 750 applicants Mustafa chose 90, who started working on their physical and dance abilities, under strict supervision. The masters of the dance company educate their dancers themselves, teaching them the basics of ballet, modern dance or folk dance, depending on the dance educational background and the area the dancers need improvements in.

The group had its first performances in 2001 and started a world tour a year later, already under the name Fire of Anatolia. The number of dancers now reaches 120, which means that the group is able to perform the same show in two or three locations at the same time. According to Erdoğan, Fire of Anatolia is currently among the three largest dance groups in the world. The dance group has performed so far in more than 40 countries, including the United States, Germany, Switzerland, Poland, Hungary, Romania, Bosnia and Herzegovina, Bulgaria, Russia, Qatar, China, Japan, Kazakhstan, France, Egypt (just in front of the Pyramids), the Netherlands and Mexico.

The programs they currently perform are named Fire of Anatolia and Dawool, the latter of which is "built on rhythm. It begins with a religious scene, then a romantic duet and continues with drum sessions. We wanted to reflect Istanbul with it, its multiculturalism, the mixture of cultures and religions" (Oktay Keresteci, ballet choreographer).

== Main staff ==
Besides the 120 dancers, there are several people working for the project. The main choreographers are Mustafa Erdoğan, who is responsible for halay and the dances of the Southern region of Turkey, while Alper Aksoy collects elements from the dances of the Aegean Region and Oktay Keresteci does the modern dance and ballet choreography. Oktay Keresteci, one of Turkey's most acknowledged ballet dancers and teachers, still performs on stage with Fire of Anatolia, despite his 48 years of age.

- General Director and Choreographer: Mustafa Erdoğan
- Supervisor: Yılmaz Erdoğan
- Music: Taner Demiralp, Fuat Saka, Mustafa Erdoğan
- Choreography: Oktay Keresteci, Alper Aksoy, Baris Akarsu
- Costume: Sultan Gözcü Özel
- Makeup Design and Stage Manager: Serkan Aydın

Preceded by Iļģi, Brainstorm, Marie N & Raimonds Pauls	Eurovision Song Contest; Final Interval act 2004	Succeeded by Ruslana
