= Siril Helljesen =

Norwegian equestrian

Personal information
- Full name: Siril Wethal Helljesen
- Born: 14 October 1978 (age 47) Oslo, Norway

Sport
- Country: Norway
- Sport: Equestrian
- Club: Siril Helljesen Dressage, Norway
- Turned pro: 2003

Achievements and titles
- Olympic finals: London 2012

Siril Helljesen (born 14 October 1978) is a Norwegian equestrian. She was born in Oslo. She finished 31st in the individual dressage at the 2012 Summer Olympics in London. She became the first Norwegian to compete in dressage event at the Olympics since 1952 Summer Olympics in Helsinki, Finland.
