= Athena (band) =

Turkish rock band

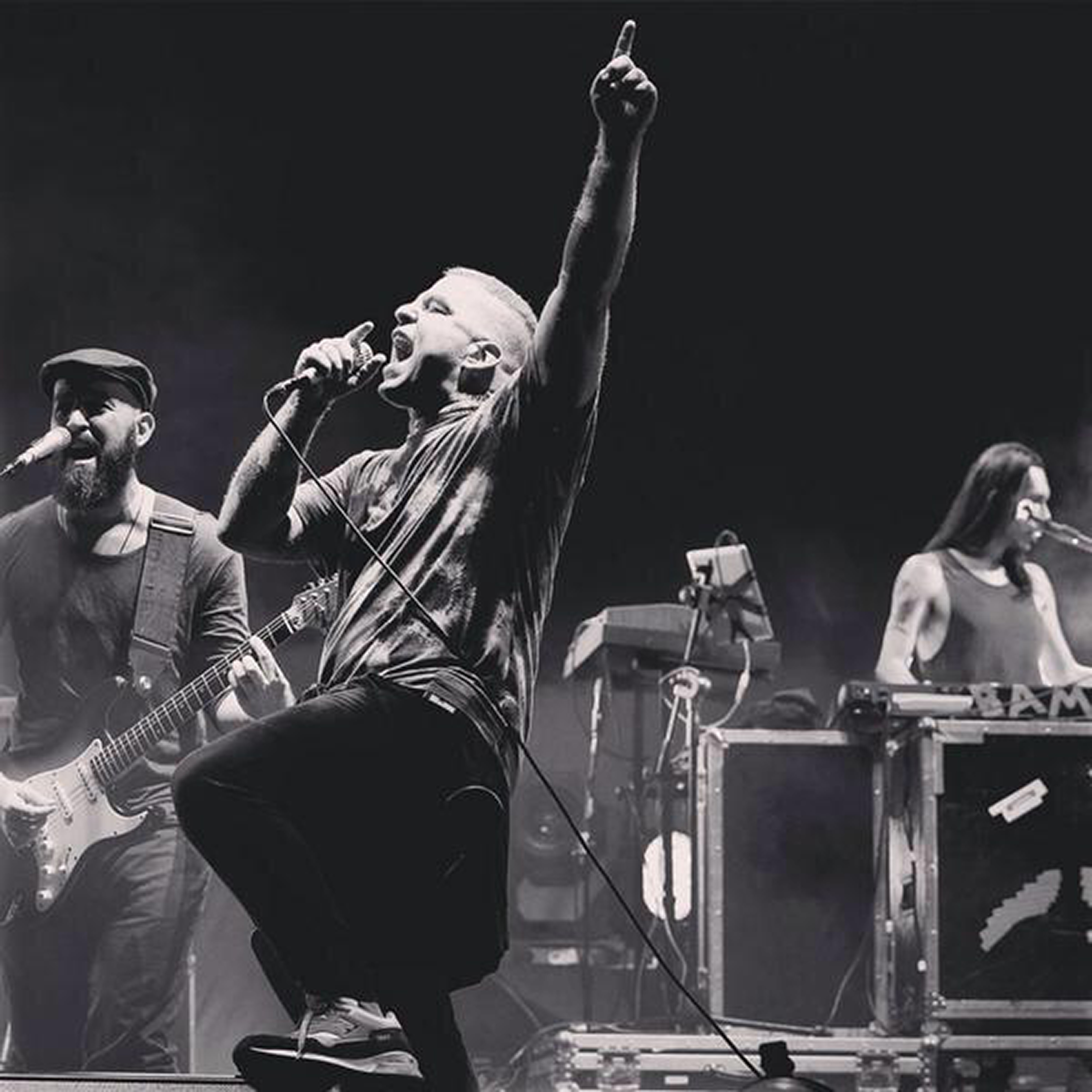

Background information
- Origin: Istanbul, Turkey
- Genres: Ska punk, punk rock, alternative rock, thrash metal (early), hardcore punk (early)
- Years active: 1987–present
- Labels: NR1; Universal; Pasaj; Athena Sanat
- Members: Gökhan Özoğuz; Hakan Özoğuz
- Past members: Alican Tezer; Asrın Tuncer; Ferit Tunçer; Ozan Karaçuha; Turgay Gülaydın; Canay Cengen; Burak Gürpınar; Ozan Musluoğlu; Doğaç Titiz; Umut Arabacı; Sinan Tinar; Emre Ataker
- Website: Official website

Athena is a rock/ska band from Istanbul, Turkey, founded by twin brothers Hakan Özoğuz (guitar and backing vocals) and Gökhan Özoğuz (lead vocals and guitar) in 1987. It is regarded as one of the best Turkish rock groups by many listeners. They have released 8 albums and featured as the Turkish entry to the Eurovision Song Contest 2004 with the song "For Real", finishing fourth.

== Band history ==
=== Foundation and rise in popularity (1997–2000) ===
Athena (ah-T'hěn-ah) was formed by twin brothers Gökhan Özoğuz and Hakan Özoğuz as a thrash metal band in 1987. After an unsuccessful first album, they switched their style to ska punk sometime later. Athena released their second album Holigan in 1998. The distinct ska sound of the album was welcomed by the local record buying public so much so that the title song Holigan was adopted as a march by football supporters of all ages at the stadiums. The album hit various Turkish charts and stayed at the top for a considerable amount of time. Shortly after releasing Holigan, Athena did a large scale tour of Turkey. One of the significant moments of the tour was their show at Açikhava Tiyatrosu in Istanbul. They later opened for Rolling Stones at a concert at Ali Sami Yen Stadium, then home to the Turkish football club Galatasaray.

Athena was the face of Turkey as part of the Millennium Concert at Taksim Square in Istanbul on the first night of 2000. The said concert was broadcast live by the Turkish channel NTV. They were later invited to the Popkomm Festival held in Köln, Germany where they performed with the Beastie Boys.

Their third album “Tam Zamanı Şimdi” was released in 2000 and the first single Yaşamak Var Ya was an instant hit in Turkey. The album sales reached gold status in an extremely short time. Their tour was sold out as a result of their exploding popularity. They performed a series of concerts in Germany pairing up with the German ska band The Fritz. After the tour, their song Devam Boşver was included in the album World of Ska Volume 11, released in Europe by the ska label Pork Pie Records. They later recorded the song Oniki Dev Adam (12 Giant Men) for the Turkish national basketball team. The Turkish team finished runner-up in the EuroBasket 2001 and many European newspapers commented that the song, sung by the team’s supporters during the games, led the team play better.

In January 2002, Athena’s fourth album Her Şey Yolunda was released. Two songs from this album, Öpücük and Beyoğlu were major hits. In 2003 Athena became part of an anti-war movement against the Iraqi war and contributed to the collaborative song Savaşa Hiç Gerek Yok (No Need for War), performing with many other musicians. Athena was the guest group at the huge dance show directed by Beyhan Murphy for Turkish Opera and Ballet. They also headlined the H2000 Festival June 2003 with Starsailor. Athena were among the headliners of the Rock'n Coke Festival of 2003 together with such acts as Pet Shop Boys, The Cardigans, Suede, Simple Minds, Sugababes, Dirty Vegas.

=== Eurovision entry, release of 5th self-titled album (2000–present) ===
On 15 May 2004 Athena represented Turkey at the Eurovision Song Contest with For Real. In an unprecedented result, the ska band finished 4th in the contest. After Eurovision, their maxi single For Real was released in Germany and Greece. Athena’s first concert after the Eurovision Song Contest was the European – Turkish Festival in Berlin which was broadcast live on TRT (Turkish National TV). After the concert, and already popular in Germany, Athena was a guest on TV Total, a popular German talk show where they performed live.

In June 2004 Athena’s new album US was released in Turkey. With the release of their fifth self-titled album, "Athena" in 2005, their sound showed signs of change once more, with the band experimenting with an alternative rock sound this time. In 2010 the band released the album Pis, which followed this change in style. In 2005, the song "Tam Zamani Simdi" was featured on the FIFA 06 soundtrack.

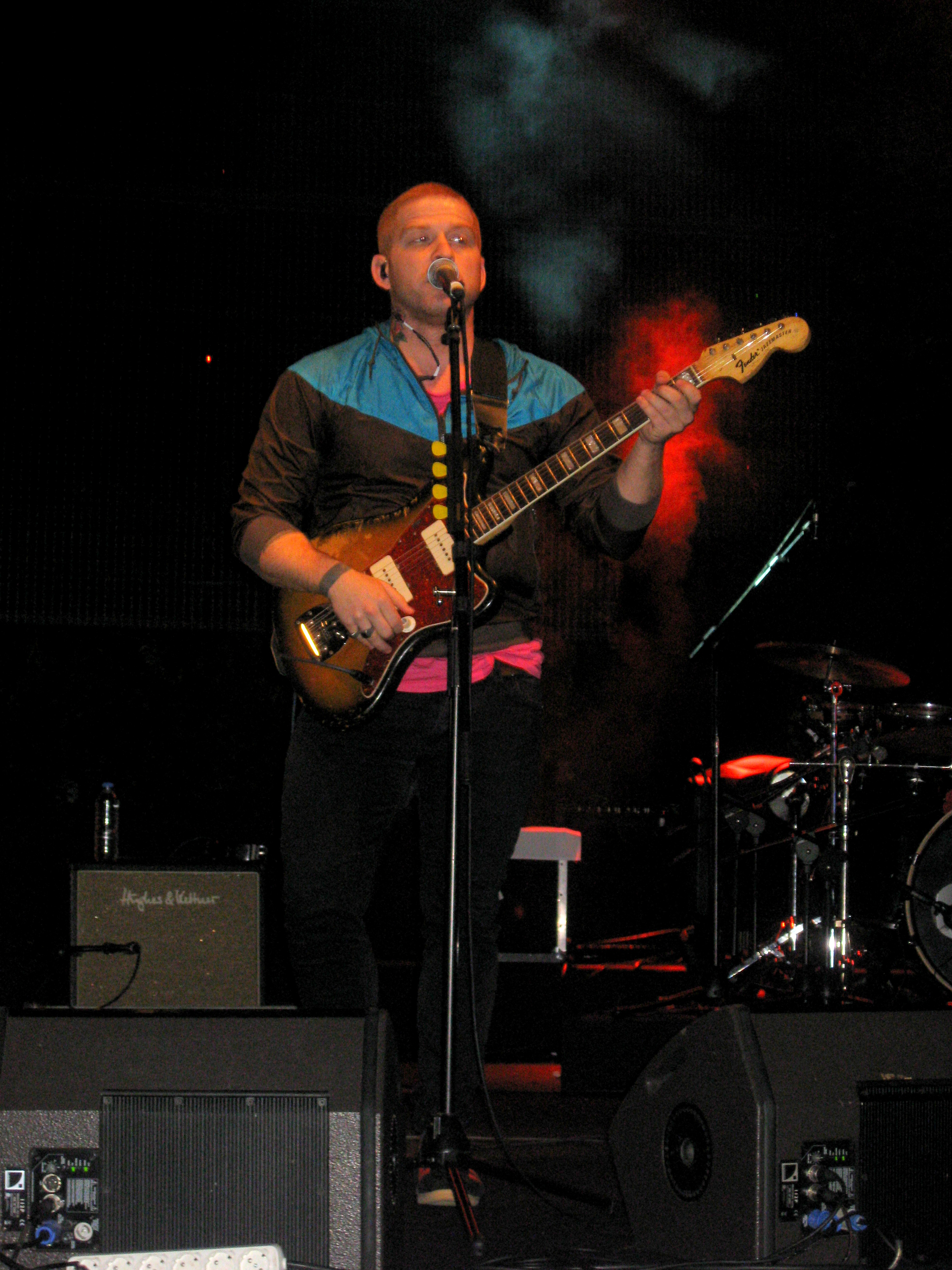
Athena's lead vocalist Gökhan Özoğuz performing live

In 2011, Athena recorded a cover of "My Way", one of Frank Sinastra's most popular songs in honor of Coca Cola's 125th anniversary with Gökhan Özoğuz being the lead songwriter of the Turkish version of the song "Ben Böyleyim".

Gökhan and Hakan Özoğuz were among the four jury members of the third season of the reality television singing competition ‘O Ses Türkiye’ aired by TV8 (the Turkish version of the television show The Voice).

In 2014, Athena released an album named Altüst. The most controversial song in that album is “Ses Etme” because of the music video which published in 2016. The music video features the day of a transgender woman. Athena criticized the prejudice against transgender people and the hate crime in this song.

== Discography ==
=== Albums ===
- 1993 – One Last Breath (April 1993)
- 1998 – Holigan (May 1998)
- 2000 – Tam Zamanı Şimdi (April 2000)
- 2002 – Herşey Yolunda (January 2002)
- 2004 – Us (June 2004)
- 2005 – Athena (May 2005)
- 2010 – Pis (May 2010)
- 2014 – Altüst (November 2014)

=== Singles and EPs ===
- 2001 – Mehteran Şeferi
- 2004 – For Real
- 2006 – İt (May 2006)
- 2007 – Fenerbahçe'nin 100 Şerefli Yılı (Fenerbahçe 100th Anniversary)
- 2011 – Ben Böyleyim
- 2016 – Geblo (Bad Cat)
- 2017 – Ses Etme (Remixes)
- 2017 – Geberiyorum (Nazım Hikmet Ran Günler Şiiri)
- 2022 – Mamak Türküsü (Yeni Türkü Zamansız)
- 2022 – Haklıyız Kazanacağız
- 2023 – Kendi Yolumda (Original Motion Picture Soundtrack) - EP (2023)

Achievements
Preceded by Sertab Erener with "Everyway That I Can"	Turkey in the Eurovision Song Contest; 2004	Succeeded by Gülseren with "Rimi Rimi Ley"
