= Ingvild Helljesen =

Norwegian journalist

Ingvild Helljese
- Born: 1971 (age 54–55)
- Occupation: Journalist
- Years active: 1998 – present
- Parent: Geir Helljesen
- Relatives: Siril Helljesen

Ingvild Helljesen (born 1971) is a program presenter and journalist in NRK. She is the daughter of Geir Helljesen and sister of Siril Helljesen. She debuted as a channel host in NRK on 31 August 1998, and replaced Kristin Johnson, who ended the same year.

She led the quiz program Midt i blinken autumn 2003, and has also been the voice-over in some purchased documentaries from abroad. In 2004, 2005 and 2006, she presented the Norwegian points in the Eurovision Song Contest. She also filled this role in 2024 as a late replacement for Alessandra Mele, who withdrew a few hours before the final "due to the inflamed situation that follows the music show in Malmö this year".
