= Gökhan Özoğuz =

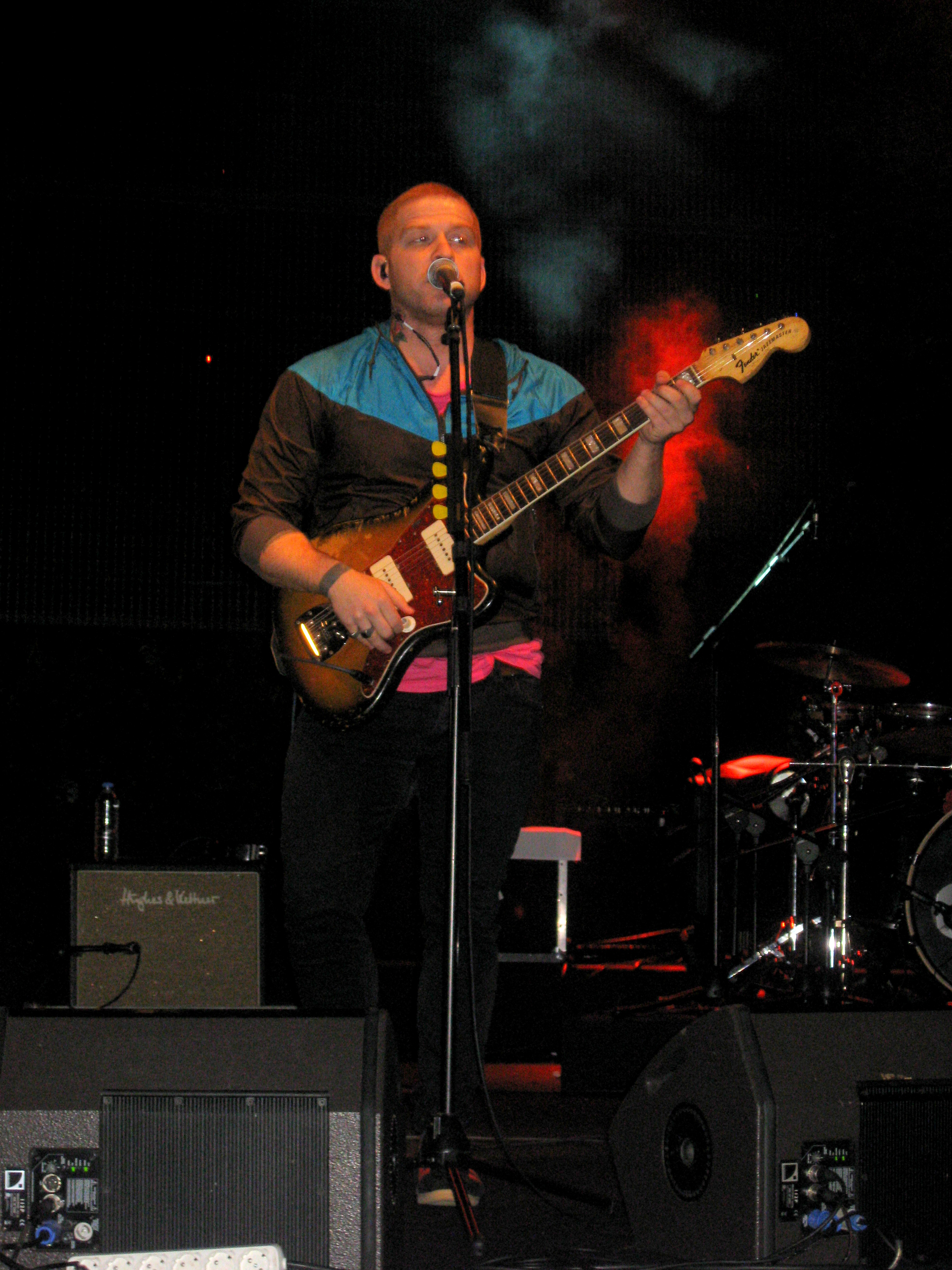
- Gökhan Özoğuz at stage performing with Athena band (2011)

Background information
- Also known as: Athena Gökhan
- Born: 11 October 1976 (age 49); Istanbul, Turkey
- Genres: Ska, punk rock
- Occupations: Singer, musician
- Years active: 1991–present
- Labels: NR1; Universal; Pasaj
- Member of: Athena

Gökhan Özoğuz (born 11 October 1976) is the lead vocalist and guitarist of the Turkish ska-punk band Athena. He is the twin brother of fellow band member Hakan Özoğuz, and a founder member of the band. He performs a broad field of music from rhythm and blues to punk rock.

He was born on 14 October 1976 at Fenerbahçe neighborhood of Kadıköy district in Istanbul, Turkey. He completed an open education program at Anadolu University.

He is a son of a pharmacist and nowadays he is living in Caddebostan district in Istanbul.

He represented Turkey at the Eurovision Song Contest 2004 in Istanbul as a part of Athena. The band became 4th with 195 points.

Gökhan Özoğuz is one of the four jury members in the third season of the reality television singing competition O Ses Türkiye aired by TV8, the Turkish version of the television show The Voice.

On 29 December 2012, Gökhan Özoğuz married Melis Ülken. His wife gave birth to a daughter on 4 July 2013, followed by fraternal twins on 7 March 2016.

== Discography ==
- Holigan (1992)
- One Last Breath (1993)
- Tam Zamanı Şimdi (1998)
- Mehteran Seferi (EP) (2001)
- Her Şey Yolunda (2002)
- US (2004)
- Athena (2005)
- İT (EP) (2006)
- 100 Şerefli Yıl (EP) (2007)
- Pis (2010)
- Altüst (2014)
- :D (2016)
- MLG (2017)

== Filmography ==
- O Şimdi Asker, (Athena Gökhan)
- O Şimdi Mahkum, (Athena Gökhan)
- Tramvay, (Gökhan)
- Tatlı Kaçıklar, (visiting actor)
- Kirmizi Oda, (actor)
