= Hakan Özoğuz =

Turkish musician (born 1976)

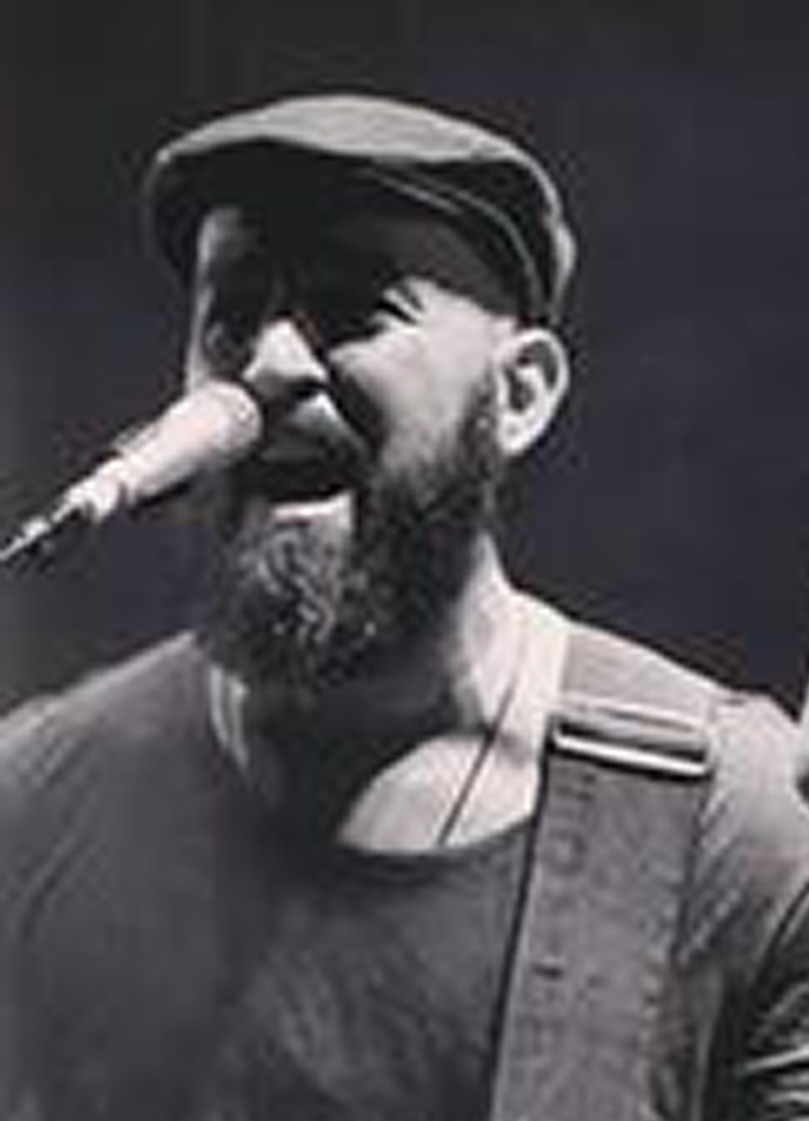

Background information
- Born: 11 October 1976 (age 48); Istanbul, Turkey
- Genres: Ska, punk rock
- Occupation: Guitarist
- Years active: 1987–present
- Labels: NR1; Universal; Pasaj
- Member of: Athena

Hakan Özoğuz (born 11 October 1976) is a Turkish musician. He is the guitarist of the Turkish ska-punk band Athena. He is the twin brother of fellow band member Gökhan Özoğuz, and a founding member of the band.

Hakan Özoğuz is one of the four jury members in the reality television singing competition O Ses Türkiye aired by TV8, the Turkish version of the television show The Voice. Hakan Özoğuz represented Turkey with the band Athena in the Eurovision Song Contest in 2004 with "For Real" reaching the 4th place with 195 points.

He went with his twin to London to have musical education there.
