= Sandra Lou =

French radio and television presenter (born 1980)

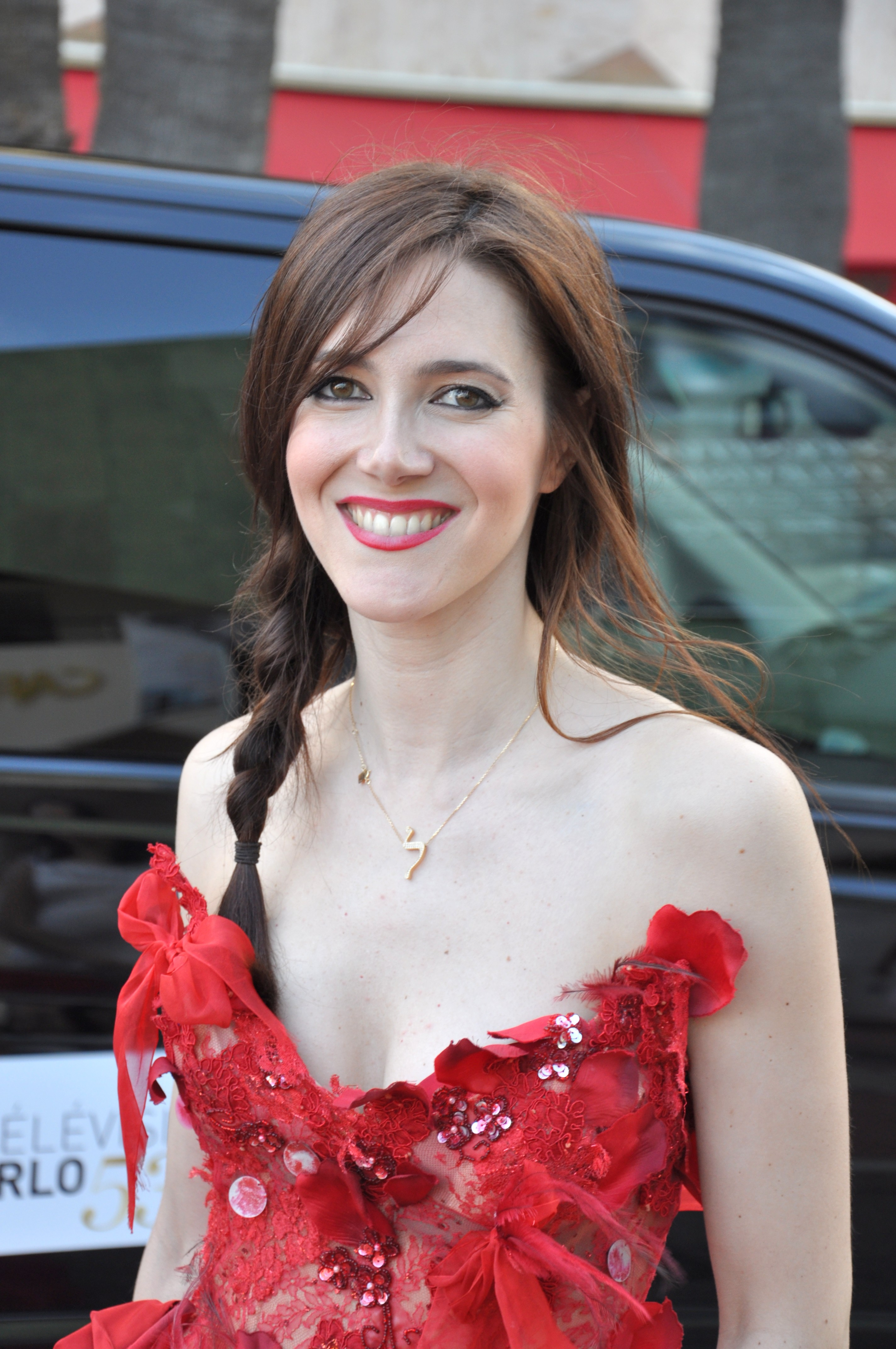
- Sandra Lou (2013)
- Born: Sandra Bretonès; 24 December 1980 (age 44); Calais, Pas-de-Calais, France
- Occupation(s): Television presenter, radio presenter
- Years active: 2001–present

Sandra Lou (born 24 December 1980) is a French radio and television presenter.

== Early life and career ==
Sandra Lou was born Sandra Benotès in Calais in the department of Pas-de-Calais. She has a younger sister and her parents are separated. Passionate about music, she learned the piano for a few years before forming a band with her friends, in which she was the lead singer. She then began her studies after obtaining her high school final exam in literature (Baccalauréat littéraire).

She later began a modeling career and became recognized in beauty contests. She was elected Miss World France 1999, after being elected Miss Nord-Pas-de-Calais. She represented France at the Miss World in December 1999, where she was ranked 12th out of 94 candidates. In 2000, she was ranked second at the World Miss University contest.

== Television career ==
She was contacted by M6 to participate at Bachelor, le gentleman célibataire (French version of The Bachelor), where she was eliminated in semi-final. She then played in some films and television series, appearing as well in some advertisements. She was contacted again by M6 to present the weather, and finally became a columnist on channels Fun TV and M6 in the program C'est pas trop tôt.

Sandra Lou co-hosted Génération Hit with Jérôme Anthony, was a replacement in Star Six Music, and also replaced Séverine Ferrer in Fan De, after her lay-off in 2005. Two years later, she was also laid off by M6 and replaced by Karine Ferri. In September 2007, she pursued her career as a presenter on the web with the site plusfortquelatele.com. She later presented Drôle de gags on channel NT1.

Since then, she has presented several programs on channel TMC such as Hell's Kitchen : les cuisines de l'enfer and Incroyable mais vrai ! Le mag since September 2008. She also started presenting at the same time the short program RTL9 Family on channel RTL9. In 2009, during the 34th edition of the Paleo Festival, she presented a daily program of 25 minutes dedicated to the best moments of the festival with Clara Morgane and Séverine Ferrer.

Since 2010, she has presented several programs and specials of Le Grand Bêtisier on TMC. Since October 2012, she presents with Vincent Cerutti and Sandrine Quétier the program Danse avec les stars, la suite on TF1.

== Music career ==
In 2004, she released the single Le Banana Split, a cover version of the Belgian singer Lio's signature song. The single became a moderate success in France, earning the 36th place on the singles chart.

== Personal life ==
In 2008, she won the trial for her abusive lay-off by M6 and earned 50,000 euros.

She gave birth to a girl named Lilli on 6 May 2009.

== Filmography ==
- Le Groupe (TV series, 2001)
- Même âge, même adresse (TV series, 2003)
- Sous le Soleil (TV series, 2008)

== Discography ==
- Le Banana Split (CD Single, 2004)
