= Karine Ferri =

French television presenter and model (born 1982)

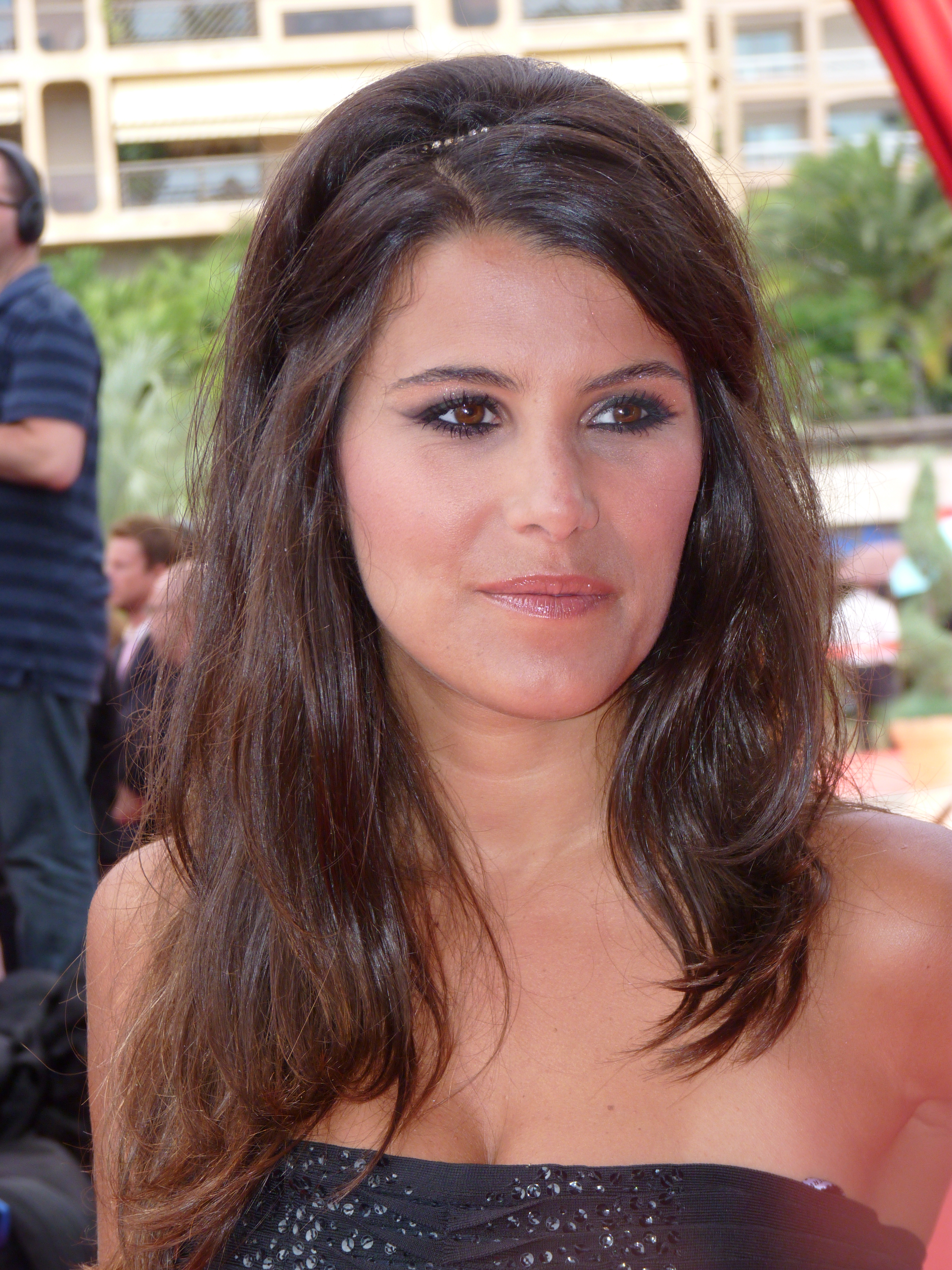
- Ferri at the 52nd Monte-Carlo Television Festival
- Born: Karine Jalabert; 25 April 1982 (age 44); Suresnes, France
- Occupation: Television presenter
- Years active: 2004–present
- Spouse: Yoann Gourcuff (m. 2019)
- Children: 3
- Website: www.karineferri-officiel.com

Karine Ferri (born 25 April 1982) is a French television presenter and model.

== Early life and education ==
Karine Ferri was born Karine Jalabert in Suresnes in the department of Hauts-de-Seine, to a French father and a Portuguese mother. She grew up in Rueil-Malmaison with her older brother David. After obtaining her high school final exam and studying modern literature at university, she started a modelling career. In 1999, she was elected first runner-up of Miss World France 2000, Sandra Lou.

== Television career ==
In 2004, she was one of the finalists on the second season of Bachelor, le gentleman célibataire (French version of The Bachelor) on M6. She began presenting television programmes while continuing her modelling career.

The same year, she co-hosted with Alex Fighter the programme En direct avec les colocataires on M6 just after Les Colocataires and joined the team of C'est pas trop tôt ! where she presents a sequence about seduction and life on the same channel. In the meantime, she presented the weather on the same channel until 2008.

She then presented on Fun TV 100 choses interdites aux moins de 30 ans from September to November 2004. In 2006 she presented Le Hit TF6 on channel TF6. From 2006 to 2009 she presented a number of programmes on M6; these include La Route en Direct, Club alternating with Ariane Brodier, Star Six Music with Alexandre Delpérier, and Fan de in which she became the third presenter.

In 2007, she presented Hit de la Pub on TF6, succeeding Virginie Efira. In 2008, she presented on W9 the fashion show of Victoria's Secret from Miami and Le Meilleur des caméras cachées on TF6 that she recorded in Las Vegas. From August 2009 to July 2010, she co-hosted Absolument Stars and Absolument Stars, la suite on M6 with Jérôme Anthony.

In early 2010 Fan de was then broadcast on W9 and was named Fan de Stars. She presented the programme from January to July 2010. After that, she announced her departure from M6, W9 and the other channels of the group to join Direct 8 in September 2010. She presented on this channel three new programmes, Mademoiselle Cinéma, L'Amour au menu and Ma Vie, a society programme.

From August 2010 to June 2011, in addition to her new programmes on Direct 8, including À chacun son histoire, she joined the radio NRJ to present, along with Nikos Aliagas, the morning programme Le 6/9 every day of the week. In summer 2011, Direct 8 entrusted her with the presentation of the daily programme Mag de l'été. From August 2011 to June 2012, she became a columnist for world television on the team of the programme Morandini !, broadcast on the same channel.

In 2012, she joined TF1 to co-host with Nikos Aliagas the second season of The Voice: la plus belle voix, where she replaced Virginie de Clausade. She also presents the programmes Toute la musique qu'on aime and Tout pour la musique. She replaced Victoria Silvstedt at the presentation of Le Grand bêtisier de l'été and Le Grand Bêtisier. She also presents programmes on TMC like Les Trente Histoires in duet with Pascal Bataille.

In October 2016, she became a contestant at the seventh season of Danse avec les stars on TF1. She was eliminated at the semi-final. On 31 December 2016, she presented Le Grand Bêtisier du 31 on the same channel and just before the programme Toute la musique qu'on aime presented by Nikos Aliagas, who celebrated the new year. In November 2017, she was one of the ten presenters[ who take turns co-hosting with Sandrine Quétier, a primetime of the eighth season of Danse avec les stars. On 31 December 2017, she presented again Le Grand Bêtisier du 31.

== Personal life ==
Since 2011, she has been in a relationship with football player Yoann Gourcuff. She announced in Paris Match on 5 November 2015 that she was expecting her first child. She gave birth to a boy named Maël on 6 April 2016 at the Saint-Grégoire hospital near Rennes. In March 2018, Karine Ferri announced that she was expecting her second child. She gave birth to a girl named Claudia on 16 July 2018. Their third child, a daughter named Sasha was born on May 3, 2023.
