= Fan de stars =

- Also known as: Fan de
- Genre: Celebrity
- Created by: Pauline Sampic
- Presented by: Séverine Ferrer (1997-2005); Sandra Lou (2005-2007); Karine Ferri (2007-2009); Karima Charni (2010-2011)
- Country of origin: France
- Original language: French language

Original release
- Network: M6 (1997-2009); W9 (2010-2011)
- Release: 15 February 1997 – 18 May 2011

Fan de Stars (originally titled Fan de until 2009) is a weekly French television show that aired from February 15, 1997 to June 13, 2009 on M6 and from January 10, 2010 to May 18, 2011 on W9.

== History ==
A few months before the launch of the show, M6 tested the public's enthusiasm for boy bands with a special episode "24 heures avec Worlds Apart" that aired on Saturday, October 12, 1996 at 11:40.

Fan de was presented by Séverine Ferrer from 1997 to 2005, Sandra Lou until June 2007, and Karine Ferri from September 2007 to 2009 until her departure from the M6 Group. Karima Charni replaced her until the end of the show.

== Concept ==
Every Saturday morning at launch, Séverine Ferrer covered the latest music news for fans of boy bands, trendy singers, and international stars. The first episode featured segments on David Charvet, 2Be3, and Alliage.

Over the months and seasons, Fan de expanded its scope to include cinema, television, and celebrity gossip. In 2000, the show targeted at young audiences included recurring segments such as "l'interview de Séverine" and the "Concours." Investigative reports like "Les nouveaux provocateurs," "Lorie: une Britney Spears à la française" and special episodes featuring stars such as Jennifer Lopez began to appear. Meet-and-greets and behind-the-scenes content became increasingly prevalent.

In September 2009, Fan de featured reportages alongside segments like "La Revue de presse," "Le Tops et les flops de la semaine," and the "GPS Star."

== Presenters ==
1997	1998	1999	2000	2001	2002	2003	2004	2005	2006	2007	2008	2009	2010	2011
Séverine Ferrer (Note: In 2000, Jenny Del Pino temporarily replaced Séverine Ferrer)									Sandra Lou		Karine Ferri		Karima Charni	
