= Monaco in the Eurovision Song Contest =

- Eurovision Song Contest
- Former participating broadcaster: Télé Monte-Carlo (TMC; 1959–2006)

Participation summary
- Appearances: 24 (21 finals)
- First appearance: 1959
- Last appearance: 2006
- Highest placement: 1st: 1971
- Participation history: 1959; 1960; 1961; 1962; 1963; 1964; 1965; 1966; 1967; 1968; 1969; 1970; 1971; 1972; 1973; 1974; 1975; 1976; 1977; 1978; 1979; 1980 – 2003; 2004; 2005; 2006; 2007 – 2026
- Monaco's page at Eurovision.com
- For the most recent participation see Monaco in the Eurovision Song Contest 2006

Monaco has been represented at the Eurovision Song Contest 24 times since its debut in 1959. The country's only win in the contest came in 1971, with "Un banc, un arbre, une rue" performed by Séverine. As a result, Monaco was expected to host the contest in 1972, but it ultimately declined. The Monégasque participating broadcaster in the contest was Télé Monte-Carlo (TMC). Monaco is the only microstate to have won the contest to date.

Monaco finished last at its first contest in 1959 before achieving three top three results in the 1960s. Two of these were achieved by François Deguelt, who finished third with "Ce soir-là" in 1960 and second with "Dis rien" in 1962. "Où sont-elles passées ?" by Romuald also finished third in 1964. Severine's victory in 1971 was the first of five top four results in eight years. The others were achieved with "Celui qui reste et celui qui s'en va" by Romuald (who returned to place fourth in 1974), "Toi, la musique et moi" by Mary Christy who was third in 1976, "Une petite française" by Michèle Torr, fourth in 1977, and "Les Jardins de Monaco" by Caline and Olivier Toussaint who were fourth in 1978. After participating in 1979, Monaco was absent from the contest for 25 years.

Monaco is the only country along with Morocco to have internally selected all of its participants.

Monaco returned to the contest for three years from 2004 to 2006 but failed to qualify for the final on all three occasions. TMC then withdrew from the contest, stating that regional voting patterns in the contest have effectively given Monaco no chance of qualifying for the final.

== Participation ==
Télé Monte-Carlo (TMC) was a full member of the European Broadcasting Union (EBU), thus eligible to participate in the Eurovision Song Contest. It participated in the contest representing Monaco since its fourth edition in 1959 until 2006. Since 1 September 2023, TVMonaco became a member of Monaco Media Diffusion, a full member of the EBU, meaning that it has been, starting in 2024, eligible to participate in Eurovision events representing Monaco.

== History ==
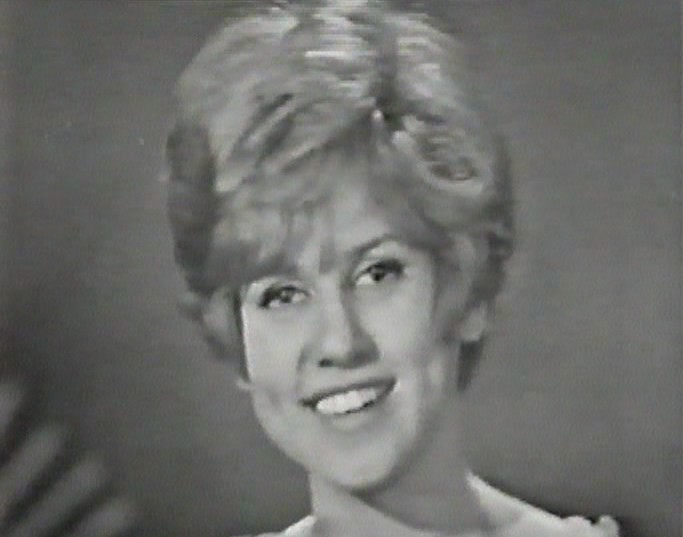
Marjorie Noël performing "Va dire à l'amour" in Naples

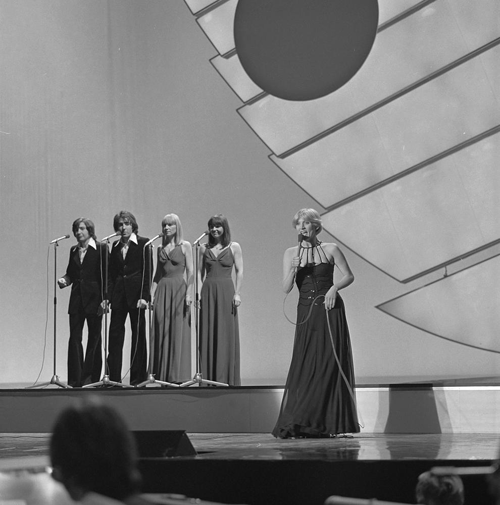
Mary Christy performing "Toi, la musique et moi" in The Hague

TMC participated in the contest 21 times between its debut in 1959 and 1979. Afterwards the it withdrew from the contest for financial reasons and lack of interest. It only returned in 2004, 25 years after its last participation. It withdrew again in 2007, after failing to qualify for the final for three consecutive years.

Monaco won the contest in 1971 with the song "Un banc, un arbre, une rue", performed by Séverine. The Monégasque victory is rather uncommon in the history of Eurovision as neither the songwriter, the singer, nor musical director were from the country they represented, something which was also the case with four of Luxembourg's five victories. Séverine furthermore declared to journalists that she had never set foot in Monaco, forgetting that the song's music video was filmed there. Séverine's producer was dishonest with her and stole her prize, thus she never got paid for her victory, even after suing him. Nevertheless, the singer is still a great fan of the contest.

Monaco's next best placing is second place, which it has achieved once in 1962. It has placed third three times, in 1960, 1964, and 1976; and last twice, in 1959 and 1966. Monaco is among the eight countries which finished last on their first participation, the others being Austria, Portugal, Malta, Turkey, Lithuania, the Czech Republic, and San Marino.

=== Hosting withdrawal ===
Monaco is the only country that has won the contest but has never organised it. After winning in 1971, TMC planned to organise the 1972 contest as an open-air show, setting the date in June rather than in early spring. Due to a lack of funding, TMC sought help from the French public broadcaster, the Office de Radiodiffusion Télévision Française (ORTF), which agreed to organise the contest. Because TMC wanted the contest to be held in Monaco while ORTF wanted it in France, negotiations never came through. In July 1971, TMC informed the EBU that it was unable to organise the contest. The EBU asked Spain's Televisión Española (TVE) and Germany's ARD, which respectively finished second and third at the 1971 contest. Since both broadcasters declined to host the 1972 contest, it was eventually held by the British Broadcasting Corporation (BBC) in Edinburgh.

=== Absence ===
Monaco was absent from the contest between 1980 and 2003, before returning for three years from 2004 to 2006. During its three-year return, all the artists representing the country, Maryon (2004), Lise Darly (2005), and Séverine Ferrer (2006), failed to qualify for the final. TMC broadcast the 2007 contest, making it eligible to participate in the 2008 contest, but it decided against it.

TMC had announced that it would return to the contest in 2009 after a two-year absence, following talks with the EBU, as well as new voting measures implemented in the contest that year. Despite this, it did not compete in 2009. The EBU announced they would work harder to bring Monaco back into the contest in 2010 alongside other lapsed participants.

The former head of the Monégasque delegation Philippe Boscagli accused certain countries of geopolitical voting, alleging the existence of Eastern European, Nordic, and Old European voting blocs, henceforth hindering Monaco's chances for qualification. With regards to the non-qualification of the Monégasque entry in 2006, "La Coco-Dance", he claimed that the audience voted more for the show than the song. As of 2025, TMC is part of the TF1 Group, the leading private broadcaster in France, and is available everywhere in France. TMC programs no longer revolve around the principality. As TF1 Group is the biggest competitor to the French public channels, it is unlikely that TMC would again broadcast the contest. When TMC did so between 2004 and 2006, its audience was much smaller than that of the French public channel. In those years, it was the government and the municipality of Monaco who chose the contestant and funded the delegation, while it is usually the responsibility of a broadcaster or a producer.

==== Possible return ====
On 22 November 2021, L'Observateur de Monaco reported that €100,000 have been allocated to "initiate the application of the Principality to the Eurovision 2023 competition" in the state budget for 2022. Monaco's potential return to the contest would have required co-operation between the Monégasque government and broadcaster TMC, which is owned by France's TF1 Group. By December 2021, the Monégasque government announced the launch of a new national public broadcaster, TVMonaco, which would be fully owned by the government, opening up a possibility of Monaco returning to the contest under the sponsorship of the Monégasque government. The channel's launch was later delayed to 1 September 2023. Upon its launch, TVMonaco became a member of Monaco Media Diffusion, a full member of the EBU, meaning that it was, starting in 2024, eligible to participate in Eurovision events representing Monaco. However, TVMonaco decided against taking part in the 2024 contest. The broadcaster's editor-in-chief, Frédéric Cauderlier, ascribed the decision to the tight deadline and to being forced to concentrate on other matters in the early stages of the launch. The broadcaster gained full independent EBU membership in late March 2024, though it did not go on to not compete in 2025, 2026, or 2027.

== Participation overview ==
Due to the country's very small size, all Monaco's entrants came from outside the principality, although French-born Minouche Barelli, who represented the principality in 1967, shared her time between Paris and Monaco, acquired Monegasque citizenship in 2002, and died in the principality on 20 February 2004 at the age of 56. The large majority of the participants were French, with also one Yugoslav, Tereza Kesovija, and one Luxembourger, Mary Christy (born Marie Ruggeri). Several singers selected to represent Monaco are key figures of the French scene, such as Françoise Hardy and Michèle Torr. Luxembourg, another small country, also sent a great number of French artists to the contest. At the 1967 contest, the Monegasque entry, "Boum-Badaboum", sung by Minouche Barelli, was written by Serge Gainsbourg. He had already composed the winning entry in 1965, "Poupée de cire, poupée de son", sung by France Gall for Luxembourg. Jean Jacques, who represented Monaco in 1969, was the first child to take part in Eurovision. He was 12 years old, making him the first preteen to participate and the first participant to be born after the inauguration of the contest.

Table key
1	First place
2	Second place
3	Third place
◁	Last place

Year	Artist	Song	Language	Final	Points	Semi	Points
1959	Jacques Pills	"Mon ami Pierrot"	French	11 ◁	1	No semi-finals	
1960	François Deguelt	"Ce soir-là"	French	3	15	No semi-finals	
1961	Colette Deréal	"Allons, allons les enfants"	French	10	6	No semi-finals	
1962	François Deguelt	"Dis rien"	French	2	13	No semi-finals	
1963	Françoise Hardy	"L'Amour s'en va"	French	5	25	No semi-finals	
1964	Romuald	"Où sont-elles passées ?"	French	3	15	No semi-finals	
1965	Marjorie Noël	"Va dire à l'amour"	French	9	7	No semi-finals	
1966	Téréza	"Bien plus fort"	French	17 ◁	0	No semi-finals	
1967	Minouche Barelli	"Boum-Badaboum"	French	5	10	No semi-finals	
1968	Line and Willy	"À chacun sa chanson"	French	7	8	No semi-finals	
1969	Jean Jacques	"Maman, Maman"	French	6	11	No semi-finals	
1970	Dominique Dussault	"Marlène"	French	8	5	No semi-finals	
1971	Séverine	"Un banc, un arbre, une rue"	French	1	128	No semi-finals	
1972	Anne-Marie Godart and Peter MacLane	"Comme on s'aime"	French	16	65	No semi-finals	
1973	Marie-France Dufour	"Un train qui part"	French	8	85	No semi-finals	
1974	Romuald	"Celui qui reste et celui qui s'en va"	French	4	14	No semi-finals	
1975	Sophie	"Une chanson c'est une lettre"	French	13	22	No semi-finals	
1976	Mary Christy	"Toi, la musique et moi"	French	3	93	No semi-finals	
1977	Michèle Torr	"Une petite française"	French	4	96	No semi-finals	
1978	Caline and Olivier Toussaint	"Les Jardins de Monaco"	French	4	107	No semi-finals	
1979	Laurent Vaguener	"Notre vie c'est la musique"	French	16	12	No semi-finals	
2004	Maryon	"Notre planète"	French	Failed to qualify		19	10
2005	Lise Darly	"Tout de moi"	French	Failed to qualify		24	22
2006	Séverine Ferrer	"La Coco-Dance"	French, Tahitian	Failed to qualify		21	14

== Related involvement ==
=== Heads of delegation ===
Heads of delegation
Year	Head of delegation	Ref.
2005	Philippe Boscagli	

=== Conductors ===
Conductors
Year	Conductor	Ref.
1959	Franck Pourcel (Note: Entry conducted by the host country's musical director)	
1960	Raymond Lefèvre	
1961	Raymond Lefèvre	
1962	Raymond Lefèvre	
1963	Raymond Lefèvre	
1964	Michel Colombier	
1965	Raymond Bernard	
1966	Alain Goraguer	
1967	Aimé Barelli	
1968	Michel Colombier	
1969	Hervé Roy	
1970	Jimmy Walter	
1971	Jean-Claude Petit	
1972	Raymond Bernard	
1973	Jean-Claude Vannier	
1974	Raymond Donnez	
1975	André Popp	
1976	Raymond Donnez	
1977	Yvon Rioland	
1978	Yvon Rioland	
1979	Gérard Salesses	

=== Commentators and spokespersons ===
Commentators and spokespersons
Year	Channel(s)	Commentator(s)	Spokesperson	Ref.
1957	Télé Monte-Carlo; Radio Monte-Carlo	Robert Beauvais (Note: Commentary provided by France's RTF)(TMC); Unknown (RMC)	Did not participate	
1958	Télé Monte-Carlo		Did not participate	
1959	Télé Monte-Carlo; Radio Monte-Carlo			
1960	Télé Monte-Carlo			
1961	Télé Monte-Carlo; Radio Monte-Carlo	Robert Beauvais		
1962	Télé Monte-Carlo; Radio Monte-Carlo			(Note: Delayed broadcast of the 1962 contest on Radio Monte-Carlo on 23 March 1962 at 17:02 CET)
1963	Télé Monte-Carlo	Pierre Tchernia		
1964	Télé Monte-Carlo	Robert Beauvais		
1965	Télé Monte-Carlo			
1966	Télé Monte-Carlo			
1967	Télé Monte-Carlo			
1968	Télé Monte-Carlo			
1969	Télé Monte-Carlo			
1970	Télé Monte-Carlo			
1971	Télé Monte-Carlo		No spokesperson	
1972	Télé Monte-Carlo		No spokesperson	
1973	Télé Monte-Carlo		No spokesperson	
1974	Télé Monte-Carlo		Sophie Hecquet	
1975	Télé Monte-Carlo			
1976	Télé Monte-Carlo			
1977	Télé Monte-Carlo			
1978	Télé Monte-Carlo			
1979	Télé Monte-Carlo			
1980–2003	No broadcast		Did not participate	N/A
2004	TMC Monte Carlo	Bernard Montiel	Anne Allegrini	
2005	TMC Monte Carlo	Bernard Montiel and Genie Godula	Anne Allegrini	
2006	TMC Monte Carlo	Bernard Montiel and Églantine Éméyé	Églantine Éméyé	
2007–2026	No broadcast		Did not participate	N/A
