= Monaco in the Eurovision Song Contest 2005 =

- Eurovision Song Contest 2005
- Participating broadcaster: Télé Monte-Carlo (TMC)
- Country: Monaco
- Selection process: Internal selection
- Announcement date: Artist: 12 January 2005; Song: 18 March 2005

Competing entry
- Song: "Tout de moi"
- Artist: Lise Darly
- Songwriters: Philippe Bosco; Didier Fabre

Placement
- Semi-final result: Failed to qualify (24th)

Participation chronology

Monaco was represented at the Eurovision Song Contest 2005 with the song "Tout de moi", composed by Didier Fabre, with lyrics by Philippe Bosco, and performed by Lise Darly. The Monégasque participating broadcaster, Télé Monte-Carlo (TMC), internally selected its entry for the contest. The selection of Lise Darly and "Tout de moi" as the Monégasque representative was announced on 12 January 2005, while the song was presented on 18 March 2005.

Monaco competed in the semi-final of the Eurovision Song Contest which took place on 19 May 2005. Performing during the show in position 6, "Tout de moi" was not announced among the top 10 entries of the semi-final and therefore did not qualify to compete in the final. It was later revealed that Monaco placed twenty-fourth out of the 25 participating countries in the semi-final with 22 points.

== Background ==
Prior to the 2005 contest, Télé Monte-Carlo (TMC) has participated in the Eurovision Song Contest representing Monaco twenty-two times since its first entry in 1959. It has won the contest once: in 1971 with the song "Un banc, un arbre, une rue" performed by Séverine, being the only entry from a microstate to have won the contest to date. It has also placed last on two occasions: in 1959 and in 1966 which also received nul points Between 1980 and 2003, Monaco did not participate in the contest with TMC citing financial reasons and lack of interest, while it returned in 2004 with the song "Notre planète" performed by Maryon but failed to qualify to the final from the semi-final.

As part of its duties as participating broadcaster, TMC organises the selection of its entry in the Eurovision Song Contest and broadcasts the event in the country. The broadcaster confirmed that it would participate in the 2005 contest on 6 October 2004. All Monégasque entries had been selected by TMC through an internal selection, a method that was continued for their 2005 participation.

== Before Eurovision ==
=== Internal selection ===
TMC internally selected its entry for the Eurovision Song Contest 2005. The French broadcaster France 3 as well as Prince Albert II and Princess Stéphanie of Monaco were also involved in the selection process. On 12 January 2005, it was announced that Lise Darly would represent Monaco at the 2005 contest with the song "Tout de moi". Darly, whose real name is Elise Granier, had previously attempted to represent Monaco at Eurovision Song Contest in 2004 placing second at the artist selection, and was selected from a shortlist of twelve female performers considered by TMC.

"Tout de moi" was written by Philippe Bosco and Didier Fabre, and was selected from several proposals received by record companies. Bosco had also previously written the Monégasque Eurovision song in 2004. In early February 2005, Darly recorded "Tout de moi" in Monaco at the Auditorium Rainier III together with the Monte-Carlo Philharmonic Orchestra, conducted by Jean-Louis Dedieu. The song was presented to the public online via the Eurovision news website ESCToday on 18 March 2005.

Artist selection
- Anne Varin
- Céréna
- Cindie
- Élodie Frégé
- Ève Angeli
- Jessica Marquez
- Lise Darly
- Melissa Mars
- Nathalie Fauran
- ~~Nolwenn Leroy~~ (Note: Nolwenn Leroy revealed in late December 2004 that she had turned down TMC's offer to represent Monaco.)
- Séverine Ferrer
- Tigra

== At Eurovision ==
According to Eurovision rules, all nations with the exceptions of the host country, the "Big Four" (France, Germany, Spain, and the United Kingdom), and the ten highest placed finishers in the 2004 contest are required to qualify from the semi-final on 19 May 2005 in order to compete for the final on 21 May 2005; the top ten countries from the semi-final progress to the final. On 22 March 2005, an allocation draw was held which determined the running order for the semi-final and Monaco was set to perform in position 6, following the entry from Latvia and before the entry from Israel. At the end of the show, Monaco was not announced among the top 10 entries in the semi-final and therefore failed to qualify to compete in the final. It was later revealed that Monaco placed twenty-fourth in the semi-final, receiving a total of 22 points.

Both the semi-final and the final were broadcast in Monaco on TMC with commentary by Bernard Montiel and Genie Godula. TMC appointed Anne Allegrini as its spokesperson to announce the results of the Monégasque jury during the final.

=== Voting ===
Between 1998 and 2008, the voting was calculated by 100% televoting from viewers across Europe. However, in 2005 the EBU introduced an undisclosed threshold number of televotes that would have to be registered in each voting country in order to make that country's votes valid. If that number was not reached, the country's backup jury would vote instead. In both the semi-final and final of the contest, this affected several countries including Monaco. Therefore, the country had to use a backup jury panel to calculate its results. This jury judged each entry based on: vocal capacity; the stage performance; the song's composition and originality; and the overall impression of the act. In addition, no member of a national jury was permitted to be related in any way to any of the competing acts in such a way that they cannot vote impartially and independently.

Below is a breakdown of points awarded to Monaco and awarded by Monaco in the semi-final and grand final of the contest. The nation awarded its 12 points to Israel in the semi-final and the final of the contest.

==== Points awarded to Monaco ====
Points awarded to Monaco (Semi-final)
Score	Country
12 points	
10 points	Andorra; France
8 points	
7 points	
6 points	
5 points	
4 points	
3 points	
2 points	Moldova
1 point	

==== Points awarded by Monaco ====
Points awarded by Monaco (Semi-final)
Score	Country
12 points	Israel
10 points	Denmark
8 points	Netherlands
7 points	Romania
6 points	Finland
5 points	Croatia
4 points	Slovenia
3 points	Macedonia
2 points	Switzerland
1 point	Belarus

Points awarded by Monaco (Final)
Score	Country
12 points	Israel
10 points	Denmark
8 points	Switzerland
7 points	Croatia
6 points	Serbia and Montenegro
5 points	Malta
4 points	Romania
3 points	Sweden
2 points	Germany
1 point	Macedonia
