= Danse avec les stars season 8 =

Danse avec les stars
- Season 8
- Celebrity winner: Agustín Galiana
- Professional winner: Candice Pascal
- No. of episodes: 10

Release
- Original network: TF1
- Original release: 14 October – 13 December 2017

Season chronology
- ← Previous; Season 7 Next → Season 9

The eighth season of the French version of Strictly Come Dancing began in October 2017 on TF1. It was hosted by Sandrine Quétier. Co-host Laurent Ournac did not return to the show after two seasons and was replaced by different celebrities from TF1 invited to host that week: Arthur, Jean-Luc Reichmann, Christophe Beaugrand, Karine Ferri, Christophe Dechavanne, Nikos Aliagas, Laurence Boccolini, Denis Brogniart, Jean-Pierre Foucault, Carole Rousseau. Marie-Claude Pietragalla did not return to the panel after five seasons and was replaced by Nico Archambault. The returning judges were Jean-Marc Généreux, Chris Marques and Fauve Hautot.

== Participants ==
| Celebrity | Occupation / known for | Professional partner | Status |
|---|---|---|---|
| Vincent Cerutti | Radio & television presenter | Katrina Patchett | Eliminated 1st on 21 October 2017 |
| Hapsatou Sy | Entrepreneur & television presenter | Jordan Mouillerac | Eliminated 2nd on 28 October 2017 |
| Arielle Dombasle | Stage & screen actress | Maxime Dereymez | Eliminated 3rd on 2 November 2017 |
| Sinclair | Singer-songwriter | Denitsa Ikonomova; Hajiba Fahmy (Week 5) | Eliminated 4th on 18 November 2017 |
| Camille Lacourt | Retired competitive backstroke swimmer | Hajiba Fahmy; Candice Pascal (Week 5) | Eliminated 5th on 25 November 2017 |
| Joy Esther | Actress | Anthony Colette; Christian Millette (Week 5) | Eliminated 6th on 2 December 2017 |
| Élodie Gossuin | Miss France & Miss Europe 2001 & radio presenter | Christian Millette; Christophe Licata (Week 5) | Eliminated 7th on 9 December 2017 |
| Tatiana Silva | Miss Belgium 2005 & weather reporter | Christophe Licata; Anthony Colette (Week 5); Maxime Dereymez (Week 7) | Third Place on 13 December 2017 |
| Lenni-Kim | Singer | Marie Denigot; Denitsa Ikonomova (Week 5) | Runner-Up on 13 December 2017 |
| Agustín Galiana | Actor | Candice Pascal; Marie Denigot (Week 5) | Winner on 13 December 2017 |

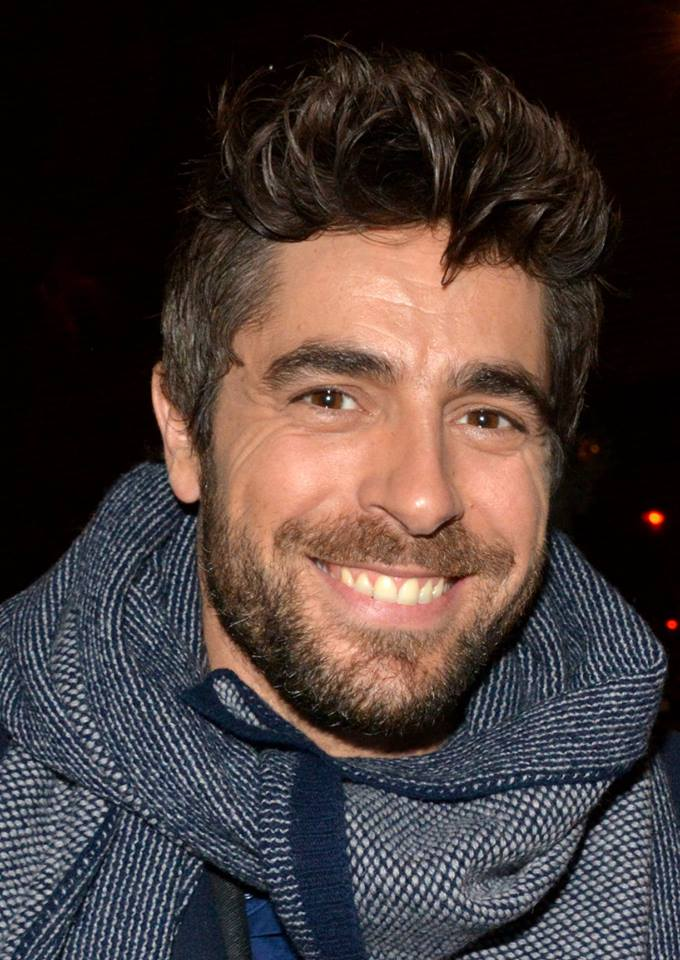
Agustín Galiana

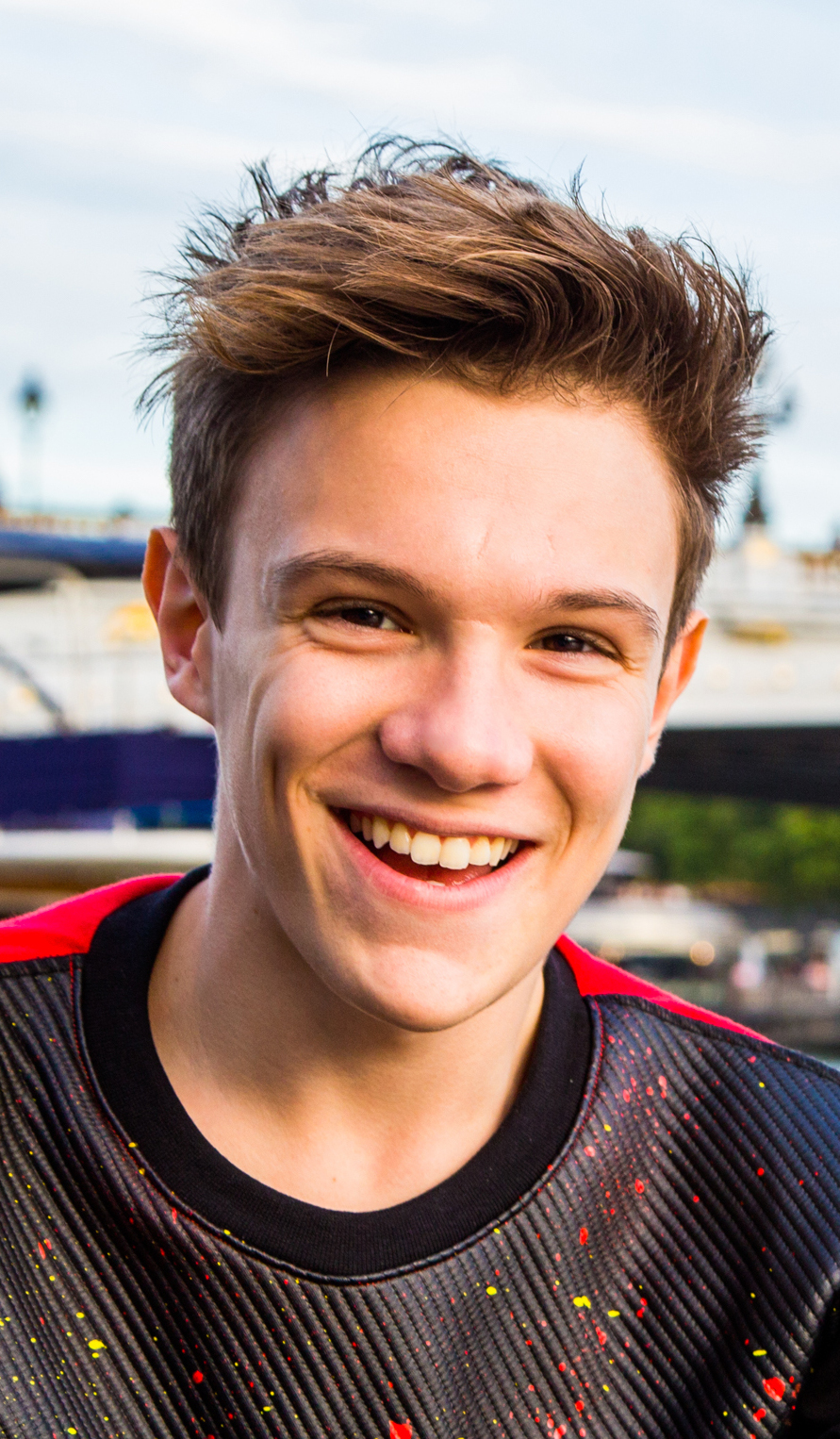
Lenni-Kim

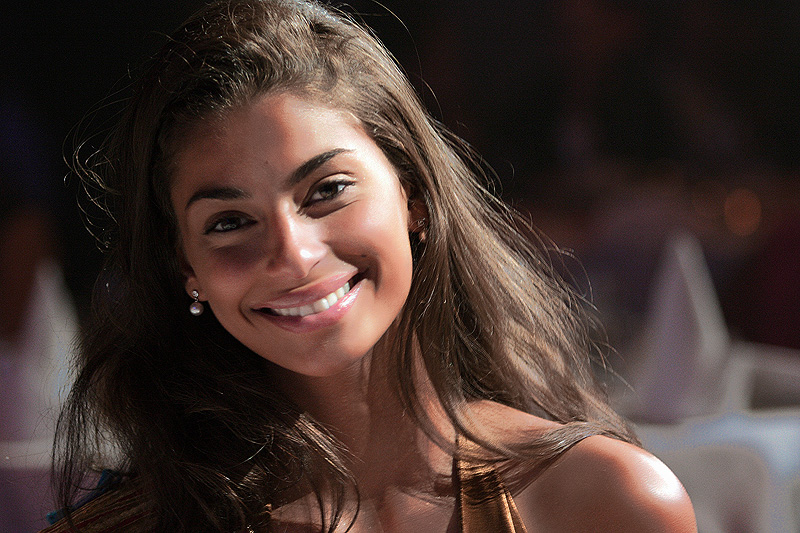
Tatiana Silva

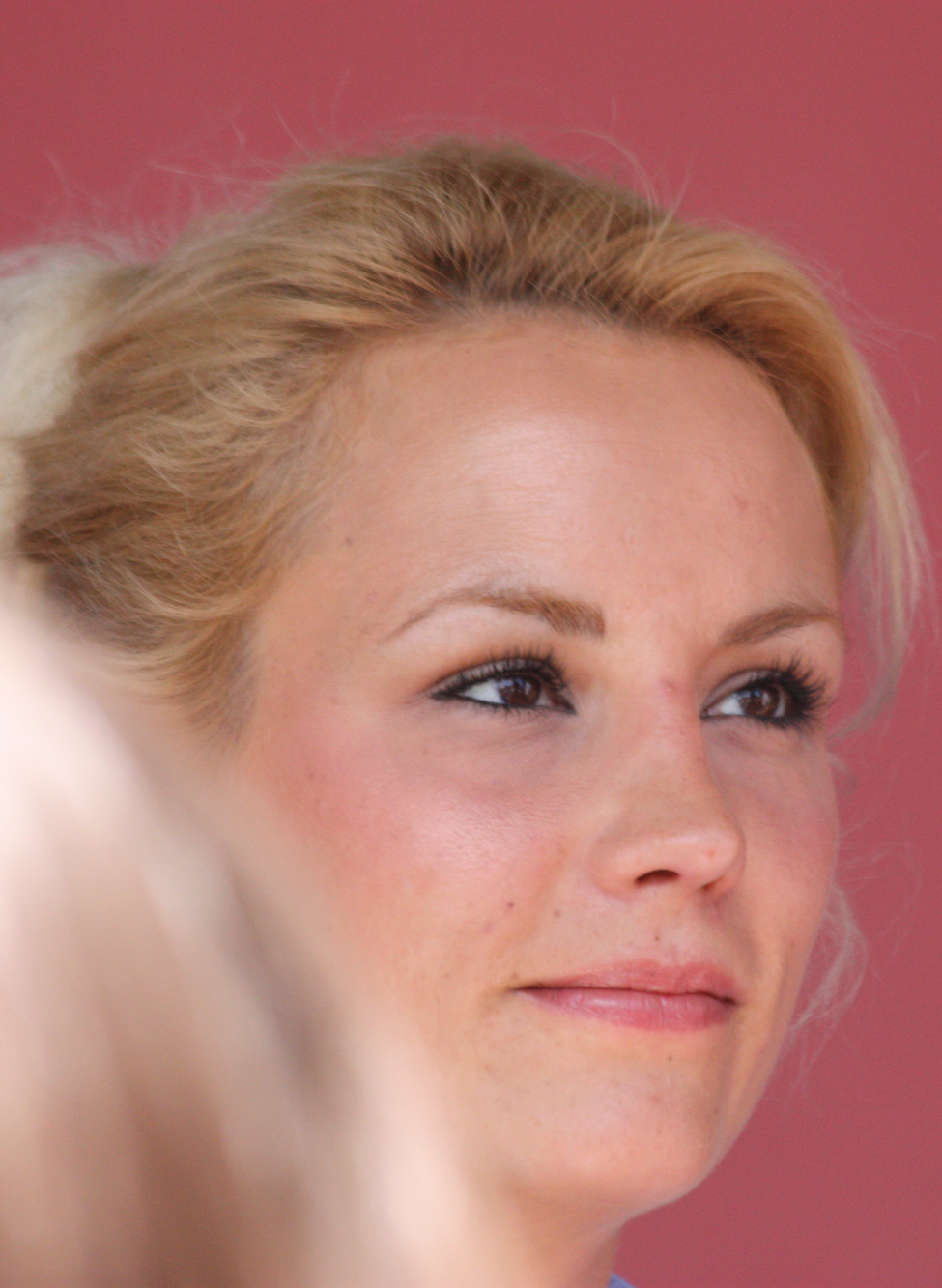
Élodie Gossuin

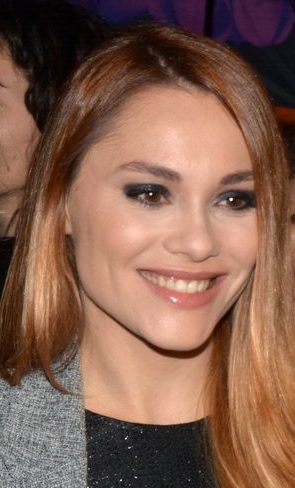
Joy Esther

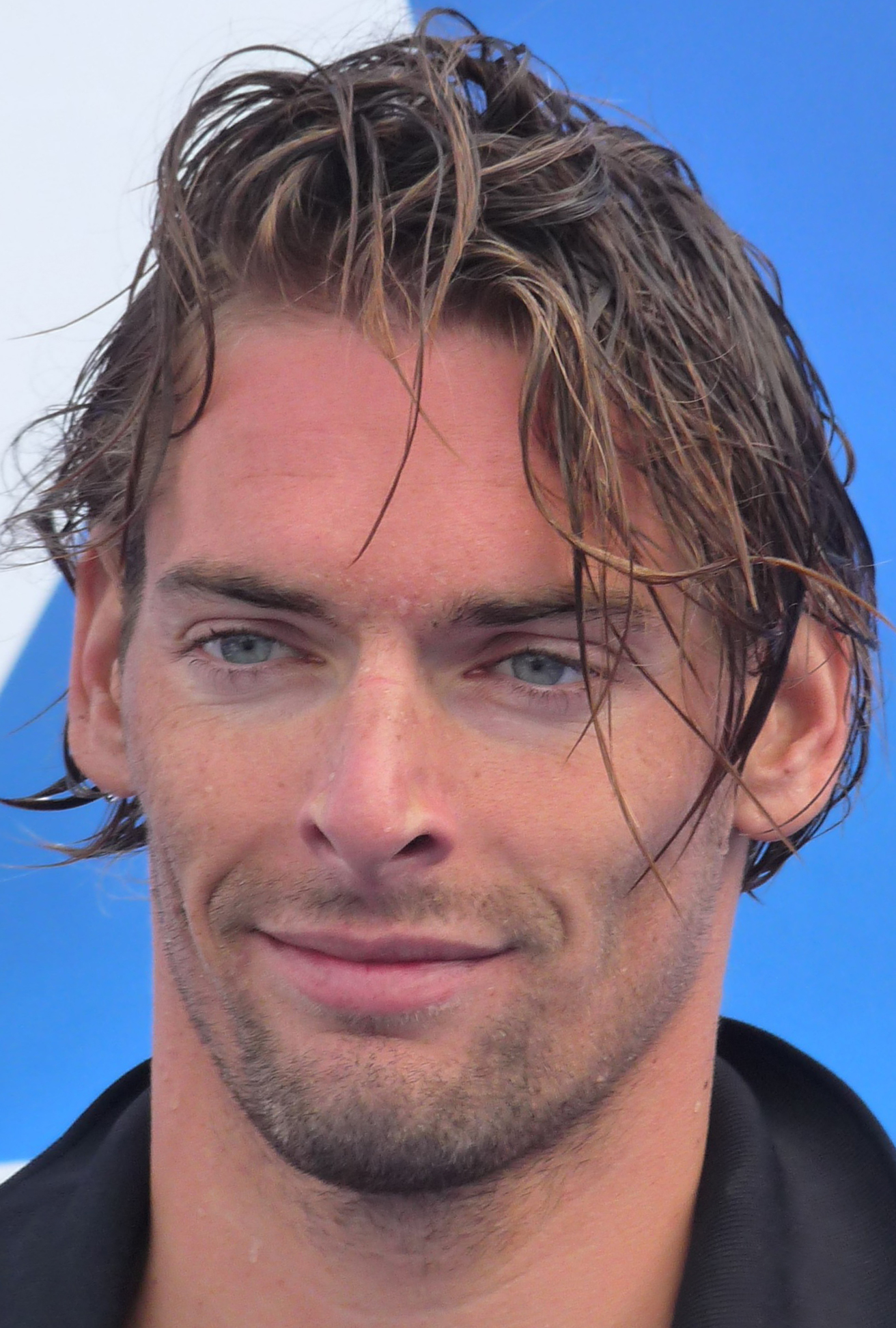
Camille Lacourt

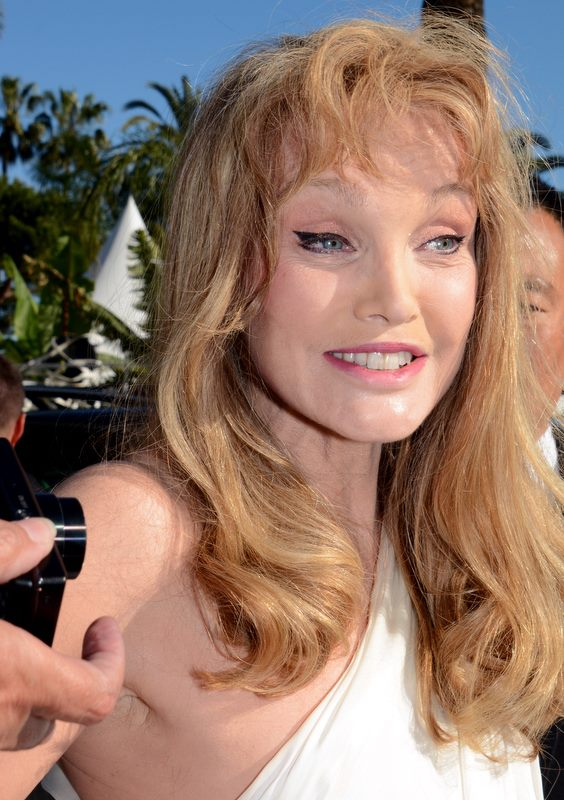
Arielle Dombasle

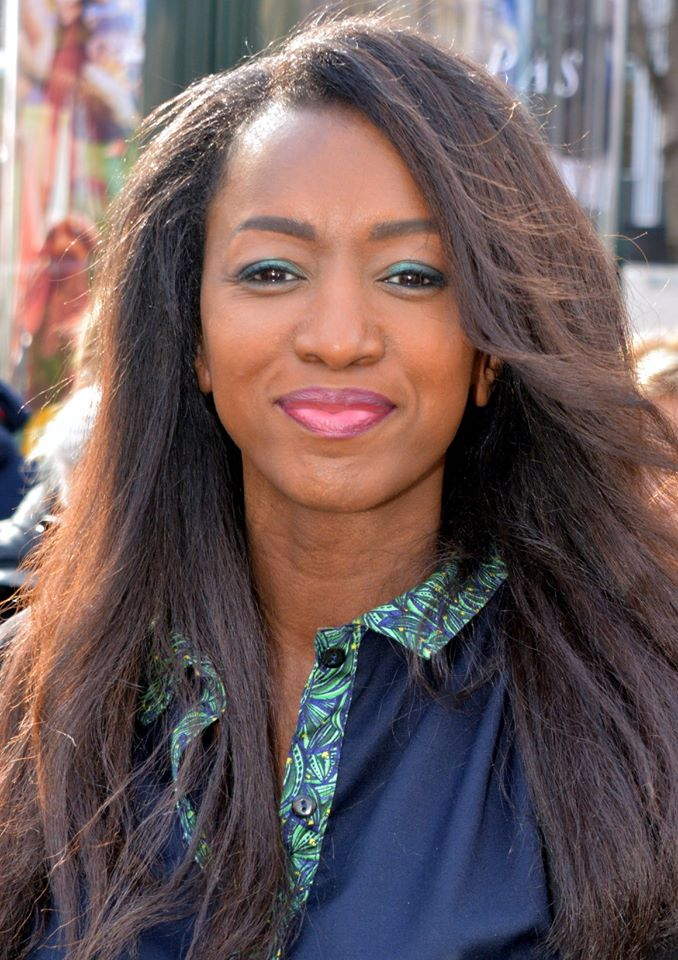
Hapsatou Sy

=== Things To Know ===
Agustin Galiana is the first foreign contestant to ever win a trophy It's the only season to have 3 contestants from abroad reaching the finals Agustin Galiana from Spain, Lenni-Kim from Canada and Tatiana Silva from Belgium

== Scoring ==
| Team | Place | 1 | 2 | 1+2 | 3 | 4 | 5 | 6 | 5+6 | 7 | 8 | 9 | 10 |
|---|---|---|---|---|---|---|---|---|---|---|---|---|---|
| Agustín & Candice | 1 | 33 | 31 | 64 | 66 | 48 | 48 + 40 = 88 | 72 | 160 | 64 + 10 = 74 | 70 + 71 = 141 | 75 + 55 = 130 | 75 + 80 = 155 |
| Lenni-Kim & Marie | 2 | 33 | 31 | 64 | 65 | 54 | 43 + 35 = 78 | 70 | 148 | 68 | 72 + 75 = 147 | 75 + 57 = 132 | 77 + 80 = 157 |
| Tatiana & Christophe | 3 | 27 | 32 | 59 | 60 | 44 | 36 + 25 = 61 | 58 | 119 | 60 + 10 = 70 | 69 + 71 = 140 | 71 + 53 = 124 | 70 + 80 = 150 |
| Élodie & Christian | 4 | 20 | 23 | 43 | 46 | 40 | 34 + 20 = 54 | 55 | 109 | 54 | 56 + 45 = 101 | 60 + 51 = 111 | |
| Joy & Anthony | 5 | 27 | 25 | 52 | 62 | 45 | 44 + 30 = 74 | 63 + 20 = 83 | 157 | 70 + 10 = 80 | 68 + 65 = 133 | | |
| Camille & Hajiba | 6 | 21 | 18 | 39 | 56 | 37 | 27 + 10 = 37 | 50 | 87 | 40 | | | |
| Sinclair & Denitsa | 7 | 21 | 25 | 46 | 57 | 39 | 30 + 15 = 45 | 54 | 99 | | | | |
| Arielle & Maxime | 8 | 24 | 26 | 50 | 60 + 20 = 80 | 41 | | | | | | | |
| Hapsatou & Jordan | 9 | 26 | 30 | 56 | 61 | | | | | | | | |
| Vincent & Katrina | 10 | 24 | 20 | 44 | | | | | | | | | |

Red numbers indicate the couples with the lowest score for each week.
Blue numbers indicate the couples with the highest score for each week.
indicates the couples eliminated that week.
indicates the returning couple that finished in the bottom two.
indicates the winning couple.
indicates the runner-up couple.
indicates the third place couple.

=== Notes of each couples ===
| Couple | Total | 10 | 9 | 8 | 7 | 6 | 5 | 4 | 3 | 2 | 1 | Average |
|---|---|---|---|---|---|---|---|---|---|---|---|---|
| Agustín & Candice | 89 | 21 | 43 | 17 | 7 | 1 | —N/a | | | | | 8.9 |
| Lenni-Kim & Marie | 89 | 29 | 38 | 14 | 8 | —N/a | | | | | | 9.0 |
| Tatiana & Christophe | 89 | 12 | 24 | 31 | 15 | 7 | —N/a | | | | | 8.2 |
| Élodie & Christian | 73 | —N/a | 4 | 18 | 20 | 12 | 16 | 3 | —N/a | | | 6.6 |
| Joy & Anthony | 59 | 4 | 15 | 21 | 13 | 5 | 1 | —N/a | | | | 7.9 |
| Camille & Hajiba | 43 | —N/a | 2 | 5 | 7 | 8 | 11 | 9 | 1 | —N/a | | 5.8 |
| Sinclair & Denitsa | 35 | —N/a | 1 | 5 | 11 | 11 | 6 | 1 | —N/a | | | 6.5 |
| Arielle & Maxime | 22 | —N/a | 2 | 2 | 11 | 5 | 2 | —N/a | | | | 6.9 |
| Hapsatou & Jordan | 16 | —N/a | 1 | 6 | 7 | 1 | 1 | —N/a | | | | 7.3 |
| Vincent & Katrina | 8 | —N/a | | | | 5 | 2 | 1 | —N/a | | | 5.5 |
| Total | 523 | 66 | 130 | 119 | 99 | 55 | 39 | 12 | 1 | 0 | 0 | 7.8 |

== Averages ==
This table only counts dances scored on the traditional 40-point scale.

| Rank by average | Place | Couple | Total | Number of dances | Average |
|---|---|---|---|---|---|
| 1 | 2 | Lenni-Kim & Marie | 800 | 13 | 35.96 |
| 2 | 1 | Agustín & Candice | 788 | 13 | 35.42 |
| 3 | 3 | Tatiana & Christophe | 731 | 13 | 32.85 |
| 4 | 5 | Joy & Anthony | 469 | 9 | 31.80 |
| 5 | 9 | Hapsatou & Jordan | 117 | 3 | 29.25 |
| 6 | 8 | Arielle & Maxime | 151 | 4 | 27.45 |
| 7 | 4 | Élodie & Christian | 484 | 11 | 26.52 |
| 8 | 7 | Sinclair & Denitsa | 226 | 6 | 25.83 |
| 9 | 6 | Camille & Hajiba | 249 | 7 | 23.16 |
| 10 | 10 | Vincent & Katrina | 44 | 2 | 22,00 |

== Highest and lowest scoring performances ==
The best and worst performances in each dance according to the judges' marks:

| Dance | Best dancer | Best score | Worst dancer | Worst score |
|---|---|---|---|---|
| Paso Doble | Agustín Galiana | 40 | Camille Lacourt | 21.6 |
| Samba | Agustín Galiana | 37.5 | Sinclair | 21 |
| Foxtrot | Agustín Galiana | 38.4 | Vincent Cerutti | 20 |
| Quickstep | Lenni-Kim | 40 | Élodie Gossuin | 22.5 |
| Rumba | Tatiana Silva | 35.33 | Camille Lacourt | 18 |
| Cha-Cha-Cha | Tatiana Silva | 35 | Élodie Gossuin | 20 |
| Argentine Tango | Joy Esther | 34 | Camille Lacourt | 20 |
| Contemporary | Tatiana Silva | 40 | Camille Lacourt; Élodie Gossuin | 28 |
| Bollywood | Hapsatou Sy | 30.5 | Hapsatou Sy | 30.5 |
| Waltz | Lenni-Kim | 38.5 | Camille Lacourt | 25 |
| Tango | Lenni-Kim | 34.4 | Élodie Gossuin | 23 |
| Jive | Lenni-Kim | 37.5 | Camille Lacourt | 24.7 |
| Viennese Waltz | Élodie Gossuin | 26.7 | Élodie Gossuin | 26.7 |
| Jazz Broadway | Agustín Galiana | 35 | Agustín Galiana | 35 |
| Salsa | Agustín Galiana; Tatiana Silva | 35.5 | Agustín Galiana; Tatiana Silva | 35.5 |

== Couples' highest and lowest scoring performances ==
According to the traditional 40-point scale:

| Couples | Highest Scoring Dances | Lowest Scoring Dances |
|---|---|---|
| Agustín & Candice | Paso Doble (40) | Contemporary (31) |
| Lenni-Kim & Marie | Quickstep (40) | Samba (31) |
| Tatiana & Christophe | Contemporary (40) | Samba (27) |
| Elodie & Christian | Fox-Trot (34) | Cha-Cha-Cha (20) |
| Joy & Anthony | Quickstep (35.2) | Cha-Cha-Cha (25) |
| Camille & Hajiba | Contemporary (28) | Rumba (18) |
| Sinclair & Denitsa | Quickstep (28.5) | Samba (21) |
| Arielle & Maxime | Tango (30) | Paso Doble (24) |
| Hapsatou & Jordan | Bollywood (30.5) | Argentine Tango (26) |
| Vincent & Katrina | Rumba (24) | Foxtrot (20) |

== Styles, scores and songs ==
=== Week 1 ===
Individual judges' scores in the chart below (given in parentheses) are listed in this order from left to right: Nico Archambault, Jean-Marc Généreux, Fauve Hautot, Chris Marques.

Running order

| Couple | Score | Style | Music |
|---|---|---|---|
| Arielle & Maxime | 24 (7,6,6,5) | Paso Doble | Makeba - Jain |
| Agustín & Candice | 33 (9,8,8,8) | Samba | Despacito - Luis Fonsi Ft Daddy Yankee |
| Camille & Hajiba | 21 (6,5,5,5) | Foxtrot | I Don't Want to Miss a Thing - Aerosmith |
| Lenni-Kim & Marie | 33 (9,7,9,8) | Quickstep | Another Day of Sun from La La Land |
| Joy & Anthony | 27 (7,7,7,6) | Rumba | Starboy - The Weeknd Ft Daft Punk |
| Élodie & Christian | 20 (5,5,5,5) | Cha-Cha-Cha | Dans un autre monde - Celine Dion |
| Tatiana & Christophe | 27 (6,7,7,7) | Samba | Déjà Vu - Beyoncé Ft Jay-Z |
| Hapsatou & Jordan | 26 (7,5,7,7) | Argentine Tango | Skyfall - Adele |
| Sinclair & Denitsa | 21 (6,4,5,6) | Samba | Shape of You - Ed Sheeran |
| Vincent & Katrina | 24 (6,6,6,6) | Rumba | J'te mentirais - Patrick Bruel |

=== Week 2: Personal Story Week ===
Individual judges' scores in the chart below (given in parentheses) are listed in this order from left to right: Nico Archambault, Jean-Marc Généreux, Fauve Hautot, Chris Marques.

Running order

| Couple | Score | | Style | Music | Result |
| Couple | Week 2 | Week 1+2 | Style | Music | Result |
|---|---|---|---|---|---|
| Agustín & Candice | 31 (8,8,7,8) | 64 | Contemporary | Il est oú le bonheur - Christophe Maé | Safe |
| Élodie & Christian | 23 (6,6,6,5) | 43 | Rumba | Je te promets - Johnny Hallyday | Safe |
| Lenni-Kim & Marie | 31 (8,7,9,7) | 64 | Samba | I Want You Back - The Jackson 5 | Safe |
| Tatiana & Christophe | 32 (8,8,8,8) | 59 | Contemporary | What About Us - Pink | Safe |
| Vincent & Katrina | 20 (5,6,5,4) | 44 | Foxtrot | Millésime - Pascal Obispo | Eliminated |
| Joy & Anthony | 25 (7,5,7,6) | 52 | Cha-Cha-Cha | Treasure - Bruno Mars | Safe |
| Sinclair & Denitsa | 25 (7,6,6,6) | 46 | Foxtrot | Ton héritage - Benjamin Biolay | Bottom 2 |
| Arielle & Maxime | 26 (7,7,7,5) | 50 | Foxtrot | Someone like You - Adele | Safe |
| Hapsatou & Jordan | 30 (7,7,8,8) | 56 | Foxtrot | Mon vieux - Daniel Guichard | Safe |
| Camille & Hajiba | 18 (4,5,5,4) | 39 | Rumba | People Help the People - Birdy | Safe |

=== Week 3: Crazy Night ===
Individual judges' scores in the chart below (given in parentheses) are listed in this order from left to right: Nico Archambault, Jean-Marc Généreux, Fauve Hautot, Chris Marques.

Each couple got a challenge in their routines and the most successful one gain 20 bonus points.

Running order

| Couple | Results | | | Style | Music | Result |
| Couple | Artistic | Technical | Total | Style | Music | Result |
|---|---|---|---|---|---|---|
| Agustín & Candice | 36 (9,9,9,9) | 30 (8,7,8,7) | 66 | Argentine Tango | Seven Nation Army - The White Stripes | Safe |
| Camille & Hajiba | 31 (8,7,9,7) | 25 (8,6,7,4) | 56 | Contemporary | Piano Concerto No. 23 - Wolfgang Amadeus Mozart | Safe |
| Tatiana & Christophe | 30 (8,8,7,7) | 30 (8,8,7,7) | 60 | Argentine Tango | In the Closet - Michael Jackson | Safe |
| Hapsatou & Jordan | 32 (9,8,8,7) | 29 (8,7,8,6) | 61 | Bollywood | Jai Ho - A. R. Rahman | Eliminated |
| Lenni-Kim & Marie | 35 (9,9,9,8) | 30 (7,8,8,7) | 65 | Waltz / Contemporary | Danser encore - Calogero | Safe |
| Élodie & Christian | 27 (9,7,6,5) | 19 (5,5,5,4) | 46 | Tango | Look What You Made Me Do - Taylor Swift | Bottom 2 |
| Joy & Anthony | 34 (8,8,9,9) | 28 (6,7,8,7) | 62 | Contemporary | You & Me - Disclosure Ft Eliza Doolittle | Safe |
| Sinclair & Denitsa | 30 (8,8,8,6) | 27 (7,7,7,6) | 57 | Quickstep | Puttin' On The Ritz - Fred Astaire | Safe |
| Arielle & Maxime | 33 (9,9,8,7) | 27 (7,7,7,6) | 60+20=80 | Tango | I've Seen That Face Before - Grace Jones / Orpheus in the Underworld - Jacques Offenbach | Safe |

=== Week 4: Coach's Night ===
Individual judges' scores in the chart below (given in parentheses) are listed in this order from left to right: Nico Archambault, Jean-Marc Généreux, Fauve Hautot, Chris Marques.

Running order

| Couple | Results | | | Style | Music | Coached by | Result |
| Couple | Artistic | Technical | Total | Style | Music | Coached by | Result |
|---|---|---|---|---|---|---|---|
| Lenni-Kim & Marie | 28 (10,9,9) | 26 (9,9,8) | 54 | Jive | Tutti Frutti - Little Richard | Jean-Marc Généreux | Safe |
| Tatiana & Christophe | 24 (8,8,8) | 20 (7,7,6) | 44 | Rumba | I Feel It Coming - The Weeknd Ft Daft Punk | Nico Archambault | Safe |
| Camille & Hajiba | 24 (7,8,9) | 13 (4,4,5) | 37 | Jive | Marry You - Bruno Mars | Chris Marques | Safe |
| Agustín & Candice | 26 (9,9,8) | 22 (8,7,7) | 48 | Rumba | I Don't Wanna Live Forever - Zayn Malik Ft Taylor Swift | Fauve Hautot | Safe |
| Arielle & Maxime | 22 (7,7,8) | 19 (6,6,7) | 41 | Rumba | Ma révérence - Véronique Sanson | Chris Marques | Eliminated |
| Joy & Anthony | 24 (8,8,8) | 21 (7,8,6) | 45 | Foxtrot | Si t'étais là - Louane Emera | Nico Archambault | Safe |
| Sinclair & Denitsa | 20 (8,7,5) | 19 (7,7,5) | 39 | Tango | Hotel California - Eagles | Fauve Hautot | Bottom 2 |
| Élodie & Christian | 22 (8,8,6) | 18 (6,7,5) | 40 | Viennese Waltz | J'envoie valser - Zazie | Jean-Marc Généreux | Safe |

=== Week 5: Switch's Night ===
Individual judges' scores in the chart below (given in parentheses) are listed in this order from left to right: Nico Archambault, Jean-Marc Généreux, Fauve Hautot, Chris Marques, the telespectators.

Running order

| Couple | Results | | | Style | Music |
| Couple | Judges' scores | Public Score | Total | Style | Music |
|---|---|---|---|---|---|
| Lenni-Kim & Denitsa | 34 (9,9,9,7) | 9 | 43 | Tango | What Do You Mean? - Justin Bieber |
| Élodie & Christophe | 26 (6,7,8,5) | 8 | 34 | Quickstep | For Once in My Life - Stevie Wonder |
| Camille & Candice | 19 (5,5,5,4) | 8 | 27 | Paso Doble | Human - Rag'n'Bone Man |
| Tatiana & Anthony | 27 (7,6,7,7) | 9 | 36 | Jive | Maniac - Michael Sembello |
| Joy & Christian | 35 (9,9,9,8) | 9 | 44 | Quickstep | Rehab - Amy Winehouse |
| Sinclair & Hajiba | 23 (6,6,6,5) | 7 | 30 | Rumba | Sublime et silence - Julien Doré |
| Agustín & Marie | 38 (10,9,10,9) | 10 | 48 | Foxtrot | The Windmills of Your Mind - Michel Legrand |
Cha-Cha-Cha Relay
| Agustín & Marie | + 40 | | 88 | Cha-Cha-Cha | Make Luv – Room 5 & Oliver Cheatham |
| Lenni-Kim & Denitsa | + 35 | | 78 | Cha-Cha-Cha | Make Luv – Room 5 & Oliver Cheatham |
| Joy & Christian | + 30 | | 74 | Cha-Cha-Cha | Make Luv – Room 5 & Oliver Cheatham |
| Tatiana & Anthony | + 25 | | 61 | Cha-Cha-Cha | Make Luv – Room 5 & Oliver Cheatham |
| Élodie & Christophe | + 20 | | 54 | Cha-Cha-Cha | Make Luv – Room 5 & Oliver Cheatham |
| Sinclair & Hajiba | + 15 | | 45 | Cha-Cha-Cha | Make Luv – Room 5 & Oliver Cheatham |
| Camille & Candice | + 10 | | 37 | Cha-Cha-Cha | Make Luv – Room 5 & Oliver Cheatham |

=== Week 6: Family Choice ===
Individual judges' scores in the chart below (given in parentheses) are listed in this order from left to right: Nico Archambault, Jean-Marc Généreux, Fauve Hautot and Chris Marques.

Running order

| Couple | Results | | | Style | Music | Result |
| Couple | Artistic | Technical | Total | Style | Music | Result |
|---|---|---|---|---|---|---|
| Élodie & Christian | 29 (7,7,8,7) | 26 (7,7,7,5) | 55 | Foxtrot | Libérée, délivrée - Anaïs Delva | Safe |
| Joy & Anthony | 33 (9,8,8,8) | 30 (8,7,8,7) | 63 | Samba | Wanna Be Startin' Somethin' - Michael Jackson | Safe |
| Lenni-Kim & Marie | 36 (10,10,9,7) | 34 (9,8,10,7) | 70 | Rumba | Maman - Louane Emera | Safe |
| Camille & Hajiba | 27 (8,7,7,5) | 23 (6,6,7,4) | 50 | Viennese Waltz | We Are the Champions - Queen | Bottom 2 |
| Tatiana & Christophe | 32 (8,8,8,8) | 26 (6,6,8,6) | 58 | Quickstep | All I Want for Christmas Is You - Mariah Carey | Safe |
| Sinclair & Denitsa | 31 (8,7,9,7) | 23 (5,5,7,6) | 54 | Jive | Wake Me Up Before You Go-Go - Wham! | Eliminated |
| Agustín & Candice | 36 (8,9,9,10) | 36 (9,9,9,9) | 72 | Paso Doble | Ameksa - Taalbi Brothers | Safe |
Best Lift Challenge
| Joy & Anthony | + 20 | | 83 | / | Be Mine - Ofenbach | |
| Élodie & Christian | + 0 | | 55 | / | Be Mine - Ofenbach | |
| Lenni-Kim & Marie | + 0 | | 70 | / | Be Mine - Ofenbach | |
| Camille & Hajiba | + 0 | | 50 | / | Be Mine - Ofenbach | |
| Tatiana & Christophe | + 0 | | 58 | / | Be Mine - Ofenbach | |
| Sinclair & Denitsa | + 0 | | 54 | / | Be Mine - Ofenbach | |
| Agustín & Candice | + 0 | | 72 | / | Be Mine - Ofenbach | |

=== Week 7: Hollywood Night ===
Individual judges' scores in the chart below (given in parentheses) are listed in this order from left to right: Nico Archambault, Jean-Marc Généreux, Fauve Hautot and Chris Marques.

Running order

| Couple | Results | | | Style | Music | Result |
| Couple | Artistic | Technical | Total | Style | Music | Result |
|---|---|---|---|---|---|---|
| Lenni-Kim & Marie | 35 (9,9,9,8) | 33 (8,8,9,8) | 68 | Foxtrot | E.T. the Extra-Terrestrial theme - John Williams | Safe |
| Joy & Anthony | 38 (10,10,10,8) | 32 (8,9,8,7) | 70 | Paso Doble | Game of Thrones thème - Ramin Djawadi | Safe |
| Agustín & Candice | 35 (8,9,9,9) | 29 (7,6,9,7) | 64 | Quickstep | We Go Together - John Travolta & Olivia Newton-John | Safe |
| Élodie & Christian | 30 (8,8,8,6) | 24 (6,6,7,5) | 54 | Rumba | All by Myself – Céline Dion | Bottom 2 |
| Camille & Hajiba | 24 (6,6,6,6) | 16 (4,4,5,3) | 40 | Argentine Tango | Haunted - Beyoncé | Eliminated |
| Tatiana & Maxime | 33 (8,8,9,8) | 27 (6,7,7,7) | 60 | Cha-Cha-Cha | Fame - Irene Cara | Safe |
Dance Duel
| Joy & Anthony | 10 (chosen by Nicolas, Jean-Marc & Fauve) | | 80 | Cha-Cha-Cha | The Power Of Love - Huey Lewis and the News | |
| Lenni-Kim & Marie | 0 (chosen by Chris) | | 68 | Cha-Cha-Cha | The Power Of Love - Huey Lewis and the News | |
| Tatiana & Jordan | 10 (chosen by Jean-Marc & Chris) | | 70 | Paso Doble | Mission: Impossible theme - Lalo Schifrin | |
| Camille & Hajiba | 0 (chosen by Nicolas & Fauve) | | 40 | Paso Doble | Mission: Impossible theme - Lalo Schifrin | |
| Agustín & Candice | 10 (chosen by Nicolas, Jean-Marc, Fauve & Chris) | | 74 | Samba | Wild Wild West - Will Smith | |
| Elodie & Christian | 0 (chosen by nobody) | | 54 | Samba | Wild Wild West - Will Smith | |

=== Week 8: Welcome at The Dancers' ===
Individual judges' scores in the chart below (given in parentheses) are listed in this order from left to right: Nico Archambault, Jean-Marc Généreux, Fauve Hautot and Chris Marques.

Running order

| Couple | Results | | | | Style | Music | Result |
| Couple | Artistic | Technical | Total | | Style | Music | Result |
|---|---|---|---|---|---|---|---|
| Agustín & Candice | 36 (9,10,9,8) | 34 (8,9,9,8) | 70 | 141 | Jazz Broadway | All That Jazz From Chicago | Safe |
| Agustín & Candice | 35 (9,9,9,8) | 36 (9,9,9,9) | 71 | 141 | Salsa | En feu - Soprano | Safe |
| Joy & Anthony | 36 (10,9,9,8) | 32 (8,9,8,7) | 68 | 133 | Argentine Tango | El Tango de Roxanne – Ewan McGregor, José Feliciano, Jacek Koman | Eliminated |
| Joy & Anthony | 35 (9,9,9,8) | 30 (7,6,9,8) | 65 | 133 | Jive | J'irai où tu iras - Celine Dion Ft Jean-Jacques Goldman | Eliminated |
| Lenni-Kim & Marie | 36 (8,10,10,8) | 36 (9,9,10,8) | 72 | 147 | Paso Doble | Unstoppable – E.S. Posthumus | Safe |
| Lenni-Kim & Marie | 38 (10,10,9,9) | 37 (9,9,10,9) | 75 | 147 | Jive | La Bamba - Ritchie Valens | Safe |
| Élodie & Christian | 31 (8,8,8,7) | 25 (5,7,6,7) | 56 | 101 | Contemporary | Fix You – Coldplay | Safe |
| Élodie & Christian | 26 (7,7,7,5) | 19 (4,4,6,5) | 45 | 101 | Quickstep | Yakety Sax - Boots Randolph | Safe |
| Tatiana & Christophe | 35 (9,9,8,9) | 34 (8,8,9,9) | 69 | 140 | Rumba | Run to You - Whitney Houston | Bottom 2 |
| Tatiana & Christophe | 37 (10,9,9,9) | 34 (9,8,8,9) | 71 | 140 | Salsa | Magic in the Air - Magic System Ft Ahmed Chawki | Bottom 2 |

=== Week 9: Tribute to Johnny Hallyday ===
Individual judges' scores in the chart below (given in parentheses) are listed in this order from left to right: Nico Archambault, Jean-Marc Généreux, Fauve Hautot and Chris Marques.

During the 2nd round, each couple dance in trio with one of the judge.

Running order

| Couple | Results | | | | Style | Music | Result |
| Couple | Artistic | Technical | Total | | Style | Music | Result |
|---|---|---|---|---|---|---|---|
| Élodie & Christian | 32 (8,8,8,8) | 28 (7,7,7,7) | 60 | 111 | Rumba | Quelque chose de Tennessee – Johnny Hallyday | Eliminated |
| Élodie & Christian | 27 (9,9,9,X) | 24 (8,8,8,X) | 51 | 111 | Foxtrot (with Chris Marques) | L'idole Des Jeunes - Johnny Hallyday | Eliminated |
| Lenni-Kim & Marie | 38 (10,10,9,9) | 37 (9,9,10,9) | 75 | 132 | Jive | Souvenirs, Souvenirs – Johnny Hallyday | Safe |
| Lenni-Kim & Marie | 30 (X,10,10,10) | 27 (X,9,9,9) | 57 | 132 | Contemporary (with Nicolas Archambault) | Diego libre dans sa tête - Johnny Hallyday | Safe |
| Tatiana & Christophe | 38 (9,10,9,10) | 33 (8,8,8,9) | 71 | 124 | Waltz | Requiem pour un fou - Johnny Hallyday | Bottom 2 |
| Tatiana & Christophe | 27 (9,9,X,9) | 26 (8,9,X,9) | 53 | 124 | Paso Doble/Rumba (with Fauve Hautot) | Marie - Johnny Hallyday | Bottom 2 |
| Agustín & Candice | 39 (10,10,10,9) | 36 (9,9,9,9) | 75 | 130 | Paso Doble | L'envie - Johnny Hallyday | Safe |
| Agustín & Candice | 29 (10,X,10,9) | 26 (9,X,9,8) | 55 | 130 | Jive (with Jean-Marc Généreux) | Gabrielle - Johnny Hallyday | Safe |
Face To Face
| Tatiana & Christophe | Safe (73%) | | | | Jive | Le Bon Temps du rock and roll - Johnny Hallyday | |
| Élodie & Christian | Eliminated (27%) | | | | Jive | Le Bon Temps du rock and roll - Johnny Hallyday | |

=== Week 10: Finals ===
Individual judges' scores in the chart below (given in parentheses) are listed in this order from left to right: Nico Archambault, Jean-Marc Généreux, Fauve Hautot and Chris Marques.

Running order

| Couple | Results | | | | Style | Music |
| Couple | Artistic | Technical | Total | | Style | Music |
|---|---|---|---|---|---|---|
| Agustín & Candice | 39 (10,10,10,9) | 36 (9,9,9,9) | 75 | 155 | Samba | Mi Gente - Willy William Ft J Balvin |
| Agustín & Candice | 40 (10,10,10,10) | 40 (10,10,10,10) | 80 | 155 | Paso Doble | Ameksa - Taalbi Brothers |
| Lenni-Kim & Marie | 39 (10,10,10,9) | 38 (10,9,10,9) | 77 | 157 | Waltz | Perfect - Ed Sheeran Ft. Beyoncé |
| Lenni-Kim & Marie | 40 (10,10,10,10) | 40 (10,10,10,10) | 80 | 157 | Quickstep | Another Day of Sun from La La Land |
| Tatiana & Christophe | 37 (9,9,10,9) | 33 (8,9,8,8) | 70 | 150 | Cha-Cha-Cha | Magnolias for Ever - Claude François |
| Tatiana & Christophe | 40 (10,10,10,10) | 40 (10,10,10,10) | 80 | 150 | Contemporary | What About Us - Pink |
The Last Dance
| Agustín & Candice | 50.33% | | | | Freestyle | Shape of My Heart - Sting |
| Lenni-Kim & Marie | 49.67% | | | | Freestyle | Forever Young - Alphaville |

== Dance chart ==
| Couple | Week 1 | Week 2 | Week 3 | Week 4 | Week 5 | | Week 6 | Week 7 | | Week 8 | | Week 9 | | Week 10 | | |
|---|---|---|---|---|---|---|---|---|---|---|---|---|---|---|---|---|
| Agustín & Candice | Samba | Contemporary | Argentine Tango | Rumba | Foxtrot (with Marie) | Cha-Cha-Cha Relay | Paso Doble | Quickstep | Samba | Jazz Broadway | Salsa | Paso Doble | Jive | Samba | Paso Doble | Freestyle |
| Lenni-Kim & Marie | Quickstep | Samba | Waltz / Contemporary | Jive | Tango (with Denitsa) | Cha-Cha-Cha Relay | Rumba | Foxtrot | Cha-Cha-Cha | Paso Doble | Jive | Jive | Contemporary | Waltz | Quickstep | Freestyle |
| Tatiana & Christophe | Samba | Contemporary | Argentine Tango | Rumba | Jive (with Anthony) | Cha-Cha-Cha Relay | Quickstep | Cha-Cha-Cha | Paso Doble | Rumba | Salsa | Waltz | Paso Doble / Rumba | Cha-Cha-Cha | Contemporary | |
| Élodie & Christian | Cha-Cha-Cha | Rumba | Tango | Viennese Waltz | Quickstep (with Christophe) | Cha-Cha-Cha Relay | Foxtrot | Rumba | Samba | Contemporary | Quickstep | Rumba | Foxtrot | | | |
| Joy & Anthony | Rumba | Cha-Cha-Cha | Contemporary | Foxtrot | Quickstep (with Christian) | Cha-Cha-Cha Relay | Samba | Paso Doble | Cha-Cha-Cha | Argentine Tango | Jive | | | | | |
| Camille & Hajiba | Foxtrot | Rumba | Contemporary | Jive | Paso Doble (with Candice) | Cha-Cha-Cha Relay | Waltz | Argentine Tango | Paso Doble | | | | | | | |
| Sinclair & Denitsa | Samba | Foxtrot | Quickstep | Tango | Rumba (with Hajiba) | Cha-Cha-Cha Relay | Jive | | | | | | | | | |
| Arielle & Maxime | Paso Doble | Foxtrot | Tango | Rumba | | | | | | | | | | | | |
| Hapsatou & Jordan | Argentine Tango | Foxtrot | Bollywood | | | | | | | | | | | | | |
| Vincent & Katrina | Rumba | Foxtrot | | | | | | | | | | | | | | |

== Ratings ==
| Show | Episode | Air date | Viewers (millions) | Rating/share Viewers over 4 | Rating/share Housewives under 50 | Weekly Viewer rank | Note |
|---|---|---|---|---|---|---|---|
| 1 | "Top 10 Perform (Week 1)" | 14 October 2017 | 4.154 | 22.7% | 32% | 1 | |
| 2 | "Top 10 Perform (Week 2)" | 21 October 2017 | 3.967 | 19.9% | / | 2 | |
| 3 | "Top 9 Perform (Week 3)" | 28 October 2017 | 4.089 | 20.6% | 29% | 1 | |
| 4 | "Top 8 Perform (Week 4)" | 2 November 2017 | 4.595 | 20.5% | 25% | 1 | * |
| 5 | "Top 7 Perform (Week 5)" | 11 November 2017 | 4.064 | 18.8% | 29.5% | 3 | |
| 6 | "Top 7 Perform (Week 6)" | 18 November 2017 | 4.109 | 19.8% | 28% | 2 | |
| 7 | "Top 6 Perform (Week 7)" | 25 November 2017 | 3.803 | 18.5% | / | 3 | |
| 8 | "Top 5 Perform (Week 8)" | 2 December 2017 | 3.771 | 17.9% | 25% | 2 | |
| 9 | "Top 4 Perform (Week 9)" | 9 December 2017 | 4.692 | 23.1% | 29% | 1 | |
