= Thierry Beccaro =

French broadcaster

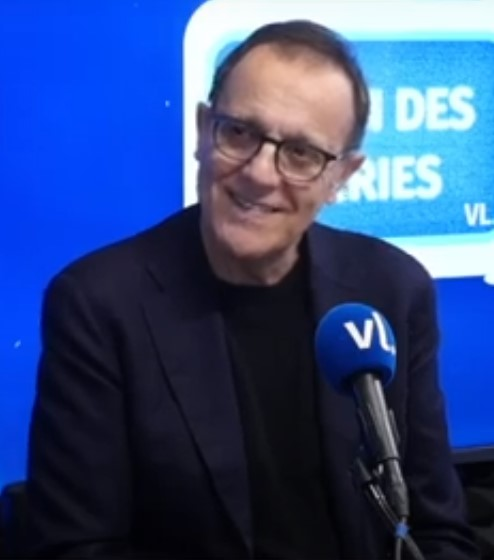
- Born: 19 October 1956 (age 69); Saint-Mandé, France
- Occupation: Game show host
- Known for: Presenter Motus (1990-2019)

Thierry Beccaro (born 19 October 1956) is a French stage actor and TV presenter, known primarily to the general public as the presenter of the television game show Motus on France 2 (1990–2019).

== Personal life ==
Beccaro has an Italian grandfather and a Breton grandmother. He has a sister, younger by four years.

== Radio career ==
He began his radio career in 1978 as an assistant to Macha Béranger at Radio France in the copyright department. In 1981, he became a reporter for Radio Bleue, and then hosted his first radio show Grand-mère et boule de gomme. In 1983, he presented the morning and early afternoon programs on Radio France and on France Inter.

== TV career ==
- In 1983, on TF1 he presented La Une est à vous.
- In 1987, he moved to Antenne 2 with the show Matin Bonheur.
- In January 1990, he hosted Après-midi show.
- On 25 June 1990, the game Motus was launched on France 2.
- He hosted other games such as Dingbats (1992) and Jeux de comédie (1996).
- He presented the show Le Grand Zapping de l'humour, broadcast on the weekend on France 2.
- He led 40 ° à l'ombre on France 3.
- He hosted several prime-time shows : La nuit des rigolos, co-presented by Valérie Maurice (1993), Parlez-moi d'amour (2000) and Y a quoi à la télé (November 14, 1998).
- He took part in various shows including Surprise sur prise or Telethon (December 2006, with Frédéric Courant and Jamy Gourmaud, hosts of the program C'est pas sorcier).
- Thierry Beccaro often replaces William Leymergie on Télématin during his vacations.
- Finally, he co-presented Le grand code du savoir vivre with Sandrine Quétier.
- He hosted a new game called Slam on France 2.
- In 2019, he leaves the game Motus and France Televisions.

== Theatre career ==
- 1993 : Boeing-boeing by Marc Camoletti, Théâtre Michel
- 1997 : Voyage de noces by Marc Camoletti, Théâtre Michel
- 2010 : Coach by Julie Carcuac, Théâtre Saint Georges
