= Romuald Figuier =

French singer (1938–2026)

Romuald Figuier (French pronunciation: [ʁɔmy.ald fiɡje]; 9 May 1938 – 12 May 2026), also known mononymously as Romuald, was a French singer.

== Life and career ==
Romuald Figuier was born in Saint-Pol-de-Léon, Finistère, Brittany on 9 May 1938. He represented Monaco in the Eurovision Song Contest 1964 with "Où sont-elles passées" and finished 3rd.

In 1968, Romuald represented Andorra at the III International Song Festival held at the Maracanazinho Stadium in Rio de Janeiro, Brazil. He finished fifth with the song "Le bruit des vagues" (S. Lebrail/P. Sevran, Romuald). The following year, he represented the same country in the same festival and finished fifth again with the song "Tous les printemps du monde" (S. Lebrail/P. Sevran, Romuald).

He participated a second time in the Eurovision Song Contest 1969, this time for Luxembourg, but his "Catherine" only reached 11th place.

His third attempt, representing Monaco again, in the Eurovision Song Contest 1974 with "Celui qui reste et celui qui s'en va", was 4th.

Romuald represented Luxembourg in the VIII International Song Festival in Sopot, Poland, in August 1968, reaching third place in international competition with the theme "Rien n'a changé".

In February 1973, Romuald represented France with "Laisse-moi le temps" in the XIV International Song Festival in Viña del Mar, Chile, where he finished 2nd and got the prize for the Best Singer. Some months later, Paul Anka bought the rights of the song from the authors (Michel Jourdan/Caravelli), and along with Sammy Cahn composed lyrics in English, giving it to Frank Sinatra, who made it famous all over the world as "Let Me Try Again" (from Ol' Blue Eyes Is Back, Reprise Records, October 1973).

Romuald died on 12 May 2026, at the age of 88.

Awards and achievements
Preceded by Françoise Hardy with "L'amour s'en va"	Monaco in the Eurovision Song Contest; 1964	Succeeded by Marjorie Noël with "Va dire à l'amour"
Preceded by Chris Baldo and Sophie Garel with "Nous vivrons d'amour"	Luxembourg in the Eurovision Song Contest; 1969	Succeeded by David Alexandre Winter with "Je suis tombé du ciel"
Preceded by Marie with "Un train qui part"	Monaco in the Eurovision Song Contest; 1974	Succeeded by Sophie with "Une chanson c'est une lettre"
