= Mary Christy =

Luxembourgish singer (born 1952)

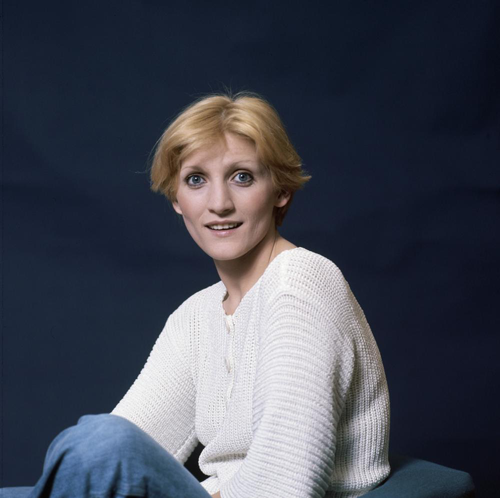
Mary Christy in 1976

Marie Ruggeri (born Maria Christina Ruggeri, 21 July 1952 in Déifferdeng), professionally known as Mary Christy, frequently credited as Mary Cristy, is a Luxembourgish singer and actress. She first appeared as a child singer in Luxembourg and Germany, and then performed in Paris in the early 1970s. She was in the rock opera La Révolution Française by Schönberg at the Palais des Sports in Paris. She is best known for representing Monaco in the Eurovision Song Contest 1976 with the song "Toi, la musique et moi".

== Life ==
Ruggeri grew up in Mamer, where her father worked as an entrepreneur. In the 1960s she was a child singer in Luxembourg and Germany where she appeared under the pseudonyms Marie Tina and Marie Christina. She recorded her first record in Germany aged eight.

In the early 1970s, she moved to Paris where she performed under the name Mary Christy, and participated in the rock opera La Révolution Française by Schönberg at the Palais des Sports in Paris.

Ruggeri is best known for representing Monaco in the Eurovision Song Contest 1976 with the song "Toi, la musique et moi". Her entry ranked 3rd out of 18 participants, receiving 93 points, including maximum 12 points from her native Luxembourg.

Ruggeri was a double for Audrey in the songs of the film La petite boutique des horreurs (Little Shop of Horrors) and dubbed many roles for Jean Cussac, Guy Pedersen and Georges Costa.

Ruggeri has also been active in theatre, with her real name, including creating a theatre company in 2004, and writing and performing several plays.

Preceded by Sophie Hecquet with Une chanson c’est une lettre	Monaco in the Eurovision Song Contest; 1976	Succeeded by Michèle Torr with Une petite française
