= Sophie Hecquet =

- Birth name: Arlette Hecquet
- Also known as: Sophie; Jenny Ann
- Born: 9 October 1944; Dax, Landes, France
- Died: 28 October 2012 (aged 68); Paris, France
- Genres: Pop, yé-yé
- Occupation(s): Singer, radio and television presenter
- Years active: 1962–1990s

Sophie Hecquet (born Arlette Hecquet, 9 October 1944 – 28 October 2012), often credited mononymously as Sophie, was a French pop singer and radio and television presenter. In 1975, she represented Monaco at the Eurovision Song Contest with the song "Une chanson c’est une lettre".

== Biography ==
She was born in Dax, Landes. Early in her career, as Jenny Ann, she toured with Johnny Hallyday. In 1962 she appeared in a Scopitone short film directed by Claude Lelouch. She started her recording career, as Sophie, in 1963, and appeared in Michel Boisrond's film Cherchez l'idole. She released a succession of singles and EPs for Decca Records in France, as an exponent of the yé-yé style, arranged by either Eddie Vartan or Jacques Loussier. She often recorded French language versions of American or British pop songs, including "Reviens vite et oublie" ("Be My Baby"), "Quand un air vous possède" ("When My Little Girl Is Smiling"), and "Je ne fais pas d'histoires" ("It's Not Unusual"). She performed regularly on television, including a duet with Charles Aznavour on the programme La La La.

After a break, she resumed a singing career in the early 1970s. In 1975, she represented Monaco at the Eurovision Song Contest with the song "Une chanson c’est une lettre", co-written and arranged by André Popp, finishing in 13th place. She then started working in radio and television as a presenter for Radio Monte-Carlo, often working with Jean-Pierre Foucault. She was also responsible for children's programmes. In the 1980s, she joined RTL-TVI in Belgium, and in the 1990s presented the programme Comme chez vous.

She opened a restaurant, La maison de Sophie, in Uccle, Belgium, in the early 2000s. In 2012, she was moved to Paris for an operation on a ruptured aneurysm, but died in hospital there, aged 68.

Preceded by Romuald Figuier with Celui qui reste et celui qui s'en va	Monaco in the Eurovision Song Contest; 1975	Succeeded by Mary Christy with Toi, la musique et moi
