= Marie-France Dufour =

French singer (1949–1990)

Marie-France Dufour or Marie (8 August 1949 – 18 October 1990) was a French singer. She made her hit Soleil in 1971, but she is probably best known for representing Monaco in the Eurovision Song Contest 1973 in Luxembourg by song "Un train qui part". She was also featured in Les Misérables as Éponine. She died of leukemia at the age of 41 in 1990.

Awards and achievements
Preceded by Anne-Marie Godart & Peter MacLane with "Comme on s'aime"	Monaco in the Eurovision Song Contest; 1973	Succeeded by Romuald with "Celui qui reste et celui qui s'en va"
