= Michèle Torr =

French singer and author (born 1947)

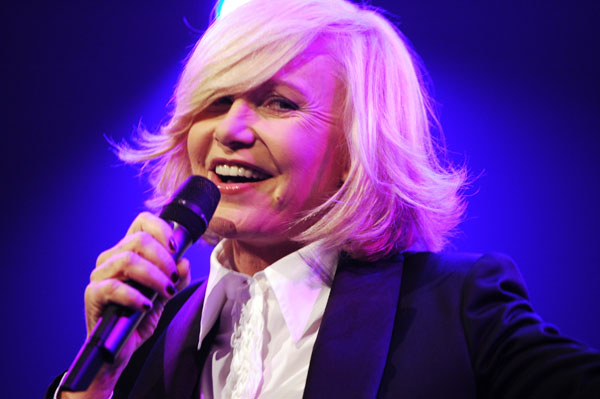
- Michèle Torr in 2006

Background information
- Born: Michelle Cléberte Tort; 7 April 1947 (age 78)
- Origin: Pertuis, France
- Genres: Pop
- Occupations: Singer, Author
- Years active: 1962–present
- Labels: Sony Music France; Mercury Records; Disc'AZ Records
- Website: micheletorr.com

Michèle Torr (born Michelle Cléberte Tort 7 April 1947) is a French singer and author, best known in non-Francophone countries for her participation in the Eurovision Song Contest for Luxembourg in 1966 and for Monaco in 1977.

== Early career ==
Born in Pertuis, Vaucluse, Torr won her first singing contest at age fifteen, in 1962, winning the first year's On Chante dans mon Quartier contest in Avignon. Michèle was a tall beautiful woman with actress-like expression, and easily wins the audience over by singing the Édith Piaf song Exodus. Mireille Mathieu was runner-up that year with Les cloches de Lisbonne by Maria Candido. Then in 1963, at age sixteen, Michèle won a recording contract with the Mercury label, and opened for Jacques Brel at the Paris Olympia. She released three EPs (four songs each) throughout 1964, which were aimed at radio and juke-box play. Torr's release of Dans mes bras, oublie ta peine in 1964 was a big hit. Further releases of both original French material, and French covers of British and American hits, proved to be hit and miss. This setting the tone for Torr's career throughout the 60's, as she tried to find her niche. The Mercury contract ended in 1972.

== Eurovision Song Contest appearances ==
In 1966, Torr was invited to perform the Luxembourgish entry, Ce soir je t'attendais, at the eleventh Eurovision Song Contest. This was permitted as there has never been a requirement at Eurovision for the singer to be native to the country they represent; indeed Luxembourg only very rarely chose a Luxembourger as their performer. As Luxembourg had won the 1965 contest, the 1966 contest was held in Luxembourg City on 5 March. Torr wound up finishing joint-tenth out of eighteen participants, alongside the entries from Finland and Germany.

Eleven years later, in 1977, Torr again took part in Eurovision, this time representing Monaco with the song Une petite française. The 1977 contest took place in London on 7 May, and Torr improved on her previous result, finishing fourth of eighteen participants.

In between her two Eurovision appearances, Torr had also taken part in the French Eurovision pre-selection in 1970 with two songs, but had not progressed beyond the semi-final stage.

== Later career ==
Torr had continued to record and release singles during the early and mid 1970s like Une vague bleue, a big hit, but she achieved the biggest successes of her career at the end of the decade with Emmène-moi danser ce soir, La séparation and Discomotion. Through the 1980s she continued to release successful singles and albums and was a regular on television. Her career stalled in the 1990s, with much less new material being released, although compilations of earlier work kept her in the public eye.

On 3 March 2008, she released her album Ces années-là on the Sony BMG Import label.

On 12 November 2012, she released an album of religious songs Chanter c'est Prier on the Sony Music France S.M.A.R.T. label.

As of 2015, She continues to tour worldwide on the French music nostalgia circuit, with almost a concert a month.

== Decorations ==
- Commander of the Order of Arts and Letters (2016)

== Discography ==
=== 45s ===
- Les Amoureux et Piano va l'amour 1973
- Une vague bleue
- Je m'appelle Michèle
- fr:Cette fille c'était moi 1975
- Ce soir je t'attendais (Eurovision) 1976
- Une petite Française (Eurovision) 1977
- fr:Emmène-moi danser ce soir 1978
- J'aime 1978
- Chanson inédite 1979
- Lui (1980)
- fr:J'en appelle à la tendresse 1981
- Midnight blue en Irlande 1983
- Adieu 1983
- Donne moi la main, donne moi l'amour 1984

=== Albums ===
- 1964: Dans mes bras oublie ta peine
- 1965: Dis-moi maintenant
- 1966: Ce soir je t'attendais
- 1970: tous les oiseaux reviennent
- 1974: un disque d'amour
- 1976: je m'appelle Michèle
- 1976: Michele Torr
- 1977: j'aime
- 1978: Emmène moi danser ce soir
- 1979: chanson inédite
- 1980: à l'Olympia
- 1980: Lui
- 1981: j'en appelle à la tendresse
- 1982: Olympia
- 1983: adieu/à mon père
- 1983: midnight blue en Irlande
- 1983: Adieu Disc'Az 478
- 1984: donne-moi le matin, donne-moi l'amour
- 1985: Michèle Torr
- 1986: Qui
- 1987: chansons de toujours
- 1987: I remember you
- 1988: je t'avais rapporté
- 1988: Argentina
- 1990: la compil' de mes succès
- 1991: vague à l'homme
- 1993: à mi vie
- 1995: à nos beaux jours
- 1996: le meilleur de Michele Torr en public
- 1997: seule
- 1998: portrait de scène
- 1998: Michele Torr 2cd
- 1999: emmene moi danser ce soir en public
- 2000: une petite française 3cd
- 2001: acoustique
- 2001: best of
- 2002: donner
- 2003: à l'Olympia
- 2003: chante Piaf
- 2004: en concert
- 2005: à l'Olympia
- 2006: la louve
- 2007: ces années là
- 2008: Olympia
- 2010: triple best of
- 2011: Olympia
- 2012: chanter c'est prier
- 2013: Herbert Léonard / Michele Torr au Québec
- 2014: diva
- 2016: tout l'amour du monde

Others

- 2012: Chanter c'est prier

== Books ==
- 1999: La Cuisine (provençale) de ma mère by Michèle Torr
- 2005: la Couleur des mots (autobiography) by Michèle Torr, and Laurent Fialaix

== See also ==
- France Gall
- Françoise Hardy
- Sylvie Vartan
- Sheila

Awards and achievements
Preceded by France Gall with "Poupée de cire, poupée de son"	Luxembourg in the Eurovision Song Contest; 1966	Succeeded by Vicky Leandros with "L'amour est bleu"
Preceded by Mary Christy with "Toi, la musique et moi"	Monaco in the Eurovision Song Contest; 1977	Succeeded by Caline & Olivier Toussaint with "Les Jardins de Monaco"
