= Lise Darly =

French singer (born 1981)

- Born: 27 December 1981 (age 44)
- Origin: Nice, France
- Genre: Pop
- Occupation: Singer
- Instrument: Vocals
- Years active: 1999–present
- Website: Official Website

Lise Darly (born 27 December 1981) is a French singer who was selected to represent Monaco in the Eurovision Song Contest 2005, held in the Ukrainian capital of Kyiv.

== Life and career ==
Lise was born in Nice. She made her mark by beating over a hundred rivals to win the Graine de Star Tour in 1999. She subsequently became a professional singer in 2001, and in 2003 entered a casting process designed to find a suitable singer to represent Monaco in the Eurovision Song Contest 2004, Lise Darly came second in the process. She was later selected to represent Monaco in the Eurovision Song Contest 2005.

In Kyiv, Lise sang a love song entitled Tout de moi (All of me), written by Philippe Bosco, who also wrote the 2004 Monegasque Eurovision entry, Notre planète (Our planet), then performed by Maryon. Maryon had ended the 2004 semi-final in 20th place, and because of this modest placing in 2004 Lise started in the semifinal line-up, from which only ten countries would progress to the grand final. In the running order of the semifinal, Monaco sang 6th (between Latvia and Israel).

Lise ended up 24th out of 25 countries in the semifinal, therefore placing 38th out of 39 total countries, beating only Lithuania. Monaco received 10 points from Andorra (who were using a jury due to an insufficient number of televotes made in the tiny principality), 10 points from France and 2 points from Moldova.

Now she is living and working in Monaco. Lise Darly was one of stars on New Year Party in Monaco.

Awards and achievements
| Preceded by Maryon with "Notre planète" | Monaco in the Eurovision Song Contest; 2005 | Succeeded by Séverine Ferrer with "La Coco-Dance" |
