= Joy Esther =

French-Spanish actress and singer

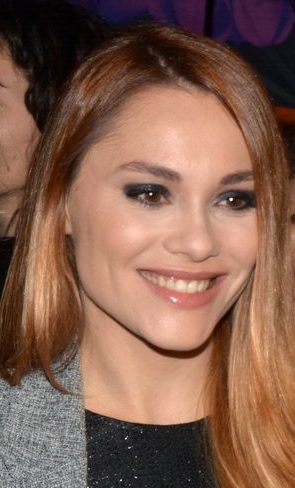
- Joy Esther in 2017.
- Born: Joy Cavé; 14 June 1984 (age 42); Lyon, France
- Occupations: Actress, singer
- Years active: 1992–present
- Notable credit(s): Nos Chers Voisins; Tout pour la lumière
- Spouse: Damien Sargue (2009–2011) (divorced)

Joy Esther (born 14 June 1984) is a French-Spanish actress and singer. She is mostly known for having played in the musical comedies Belles belles belles and Roméo et Juliette, as well as here roles of Chloé Varenko in the comedy series Nos Chers Voisins and Victoria Vargas in the series Tout pour la lumière.

== Early life and education ==
Joy Esther was born in Lyon. As a child, she took classes of singing and theatre, in addition to football, athletics and judo. She then took classes at the Cours Florent for three years. She also took lessons of modern dance and learnt to play the guitar and the piano as an autodidact.

== Career ==
Esther started her career at the age of eight in modelling and appearing in some advertisements like Les voleurs de couleur of Kodak by photographers Jean-Baptiste Mondino and Jean-Paul Goude.

From age 11 to 18, she played in a number of films and television films, taking at the same time classes of theater, singing, guitar and piano during her studies. She began her acting career in the theater play Poussez pas y aura d'la place by Jean-Yves Brignon.

At age 19, she had one of the three main roles in the musical comedy Belles belles belles played at the Olympia in Paris for two months.

In 2006, she played the role of Juliet in the musical Roméo et Juliette, de la Haine à l'Amour for an Asian tour. Over 200 shows were played in Seoul, South Korea and Taipei, Taiwan, following 40 shows in Paris at the Palais des Congrès in 2010. From October 2012 to January 2013, the show played in Japan in Tokyo and Osaka, and later in China in Shanghai.

Esther continued playing in various series and television films. From spring 2012 to June 2017, she portrayed Chloé Varenko in the comedy series Nos Chers Voisins broadcast on TF1.

She was a contestant at the eighth season of Danse avec les stars broadcast on TF1 in October 2017. She was eliminated just before the semi-final against Tatiana Silva.

== Personal life ==
Esther married French singer Damien Sargue, who co-starred with her in Roméo et Juliette, in Las Vegas in September 2009. The couple divorced in 2011.

In October 2022, Esther announced expecting her first child. She gave birth to a girl named Nina on 27 November 2022.

Esther's mother is from the Spanish region of Andalusia. Esther speaks fluently French, English, Spanish and Italian.

== Filmography ==
=== Television ===
Year	Title	Role	Notes
1997	Mission protection rapprochée	Anne Janson	TV film (credited as Joy Cavé)
1999	Une femme d'honneur	Alice	Season 3, episode "Coupable idéal" (credited as Joy Cavé)
2008	Pas de secrets entre nous	Aurélie	Several episodes
2008	Sur le fil	Caroline	Season 2, episode "Revanche"
2008	Mademoiselle Joubert	Joss	Season 3, episode "En toute amitié"
2009	Paris 16^{e}	Isabelle	Season 1, episode 18
2009	Comprendre et pardonner	Victoire	Episode "Monsieur Bovary"
2009	R.I.S, police scientifique	Zoé Girard	Season 5, episode "Parade mortelle"
2011	Chante !	Noémie	Season 4, several episodes
2012	Paradis criminel	Virginie	Mini-series
2012–17	Nos Chers Voisins	Chloé Varenko	

=== Theatre ===
Year	Title	Role	Notes
2003–04	Belles belles belles	Émilie	70 shows at the Olympia
2007–13	Roméo et Juliette, de la Haine à l'Amour	Juliette Capulet	200 shows in South Korea and Taiwan; 42 shows at the Palais des Congrès de Paris
