= Monaco in the Eurovision Song Contest 2004 =

- Eurovision Song Contest 2004
- Participating broadcaster: Télé Monte-Carlo (TMC)
- Country: Monaco
- Selection process: Internal selection
- Announcement date: 22 February 2004

Competing entry
- Song: "Notre planète"
- Artist: Maryon
- Songwriters: Philippe Bosco; Patrick Sassier

Placement
- Semi-final result: Failed to qualify (19th)

Participation chronology

Monaco was represented at the Eurovision Song Contest 2004 with the song "Notre planète", written by Philippe Bosco and Patrick Sassier, and performed by Maryon. The Monégasque participating broadcaster, Télé Monte-Carlo (TMC), internally selected its entry for the contest. The broadcaster returned to the Eurovision Song Contest after a twenty-five-year absence. The selection of Maryon and "Notre planète" was announced on 22 February 2004.

Monaco competed in the semi-final of the Eurovision Song Contest which took place on 12 May 2004. Performing during the show in position 9, "Notre planète" was not announced among the top 10 entries of the semi-final and therefore did not qualify to compete in the final. It was later revealed that Monaco placed nineteenth out of the 22 participating countries in the semi-final with 10 points.

== Background ==
Prior to the 2004 contest, Télé Monte-Carlo (TMC) has participated in the Eurovision Song Contest representing Monaco twenty-one times since its first entry in 1959. It has won the contest once: in 1971 with the song "Un banc, un arbre, une rue" performed by Séverine, being the only entry from a microstate to have won the contest to date. It has also placed last on two occasions: in 1959 and in 1966 which also received nul points. Since 1980, Monaco did not participate in the contest with TMC citing financial reasons and lack of interest.

As part of its duties as participating broadcaster, TMC organises the selection of its entry in the Eurovision Song Contest and broadcasts the event in the country. On 15 October 2003, the European Broadcasting Union (EBU) confirmed that TMC would participate in the 2004 contest representing Monaco following a twenty-five-year absence. The broadcaster had internally selected all its entries in the past, a method that continued for its 2004 participation.

== Before Eurovision ==
=== Internal selection ===
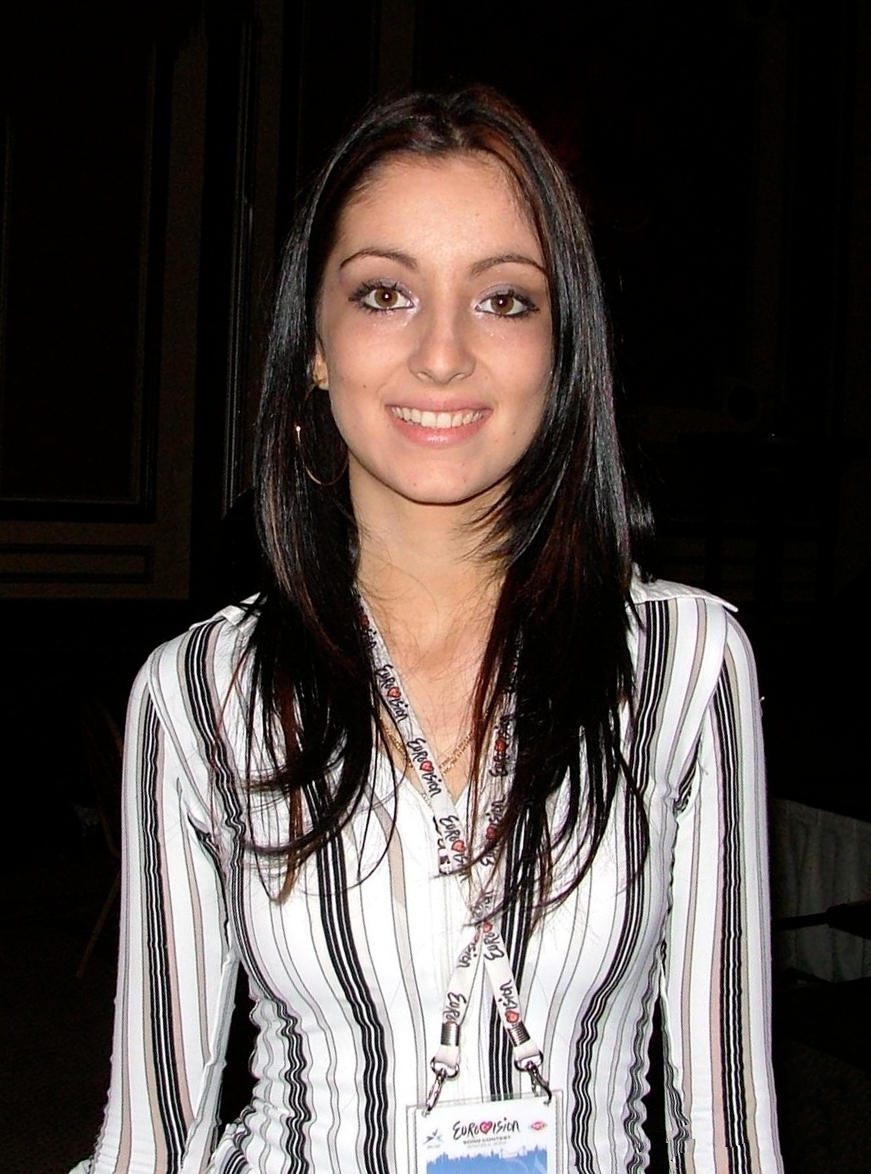
Maryon was internally selected to represent Monaco in 2004

TCM internally selected its entry for the Eurovision Song Contest 2004. Female performers aged between 16 and 35 and residing in Monaco, Corsica, or South-Eastern France were able to apply by submitting a cover of a song, preferably in French, between 24 January 2004 and 14 February 2004.

An audition round took place on 21 February 2004 at the Stars'n'Bar in Monte Carlo where 21 performers, selected from 500 applicants, each performed two songs: a cover of their choice from 40 songs provided by TMC and the Monégasque Eurovision song "Notre planéte", a disco-themed song about the Mediterranean Sea and its need for protection. The winner was selected over two rounds. In the first round, a nine-member jury panel consisting of representatives of the Société des bains de mer and TMC as well as the songwriters of "Notre planéte", Philippe Bosco and Patrick Sassier, selected four candidates to advance to the second round: Cindie Bruzzie, Elise Granier, Maryon Gargiulo and Sandra Betty. In the second round, the jury selected Maryon Gargiulo as the winner and Elise Granier as the runner-up. The audition was also attended by Monaco's Prince Albert who congratulated Maryon publicly upon her selection as the Monégasque entrant.

Artist selection – 21 February 2004
- France Picoulet
- Celine Raffaele
- Maryon Gargiulo
- Laureen Sategna
- Laetitia Regnier
- Elise Granier
- Cynthia
- Manuela Spada
- Donia Esther
- Emma Casavecchi
- Sandra Betty
- Cindie Bruzzie
- Maeva Lefevre
- Myriam Feezaa
- Isabelle Raynouard
- Anne Laure Sibon
- Nelly Osten
- Cecile Couderc
- Celine Verrando
- Francine Massiani
- Audrey Colombi

== At Eurovision ==
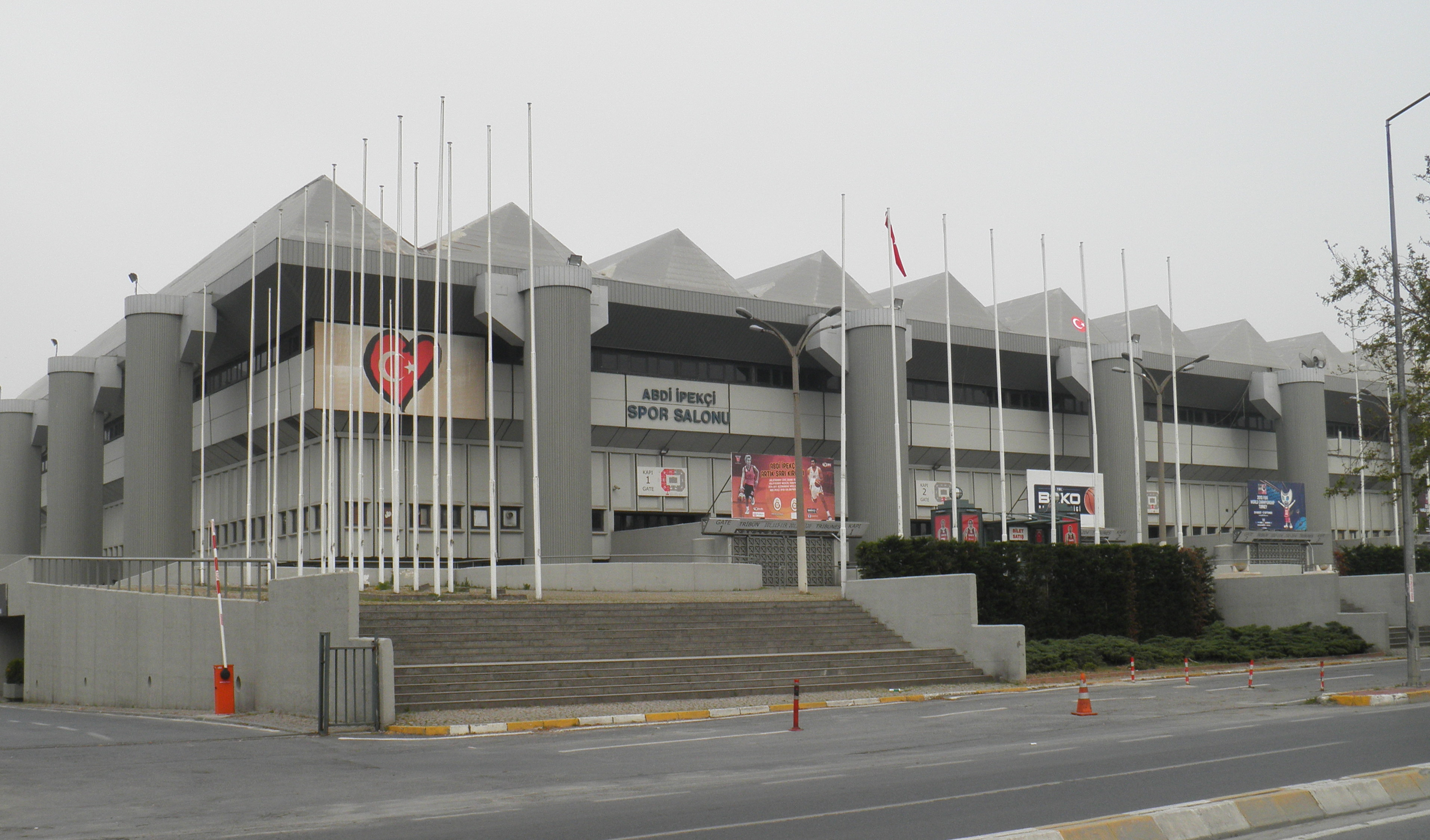
The Eurovision Song Contest 2004 took place at the Abdi İpekçi Arena in Istanbul, Turkey.

It was announced that the competition's format would be expanded to include a semi-final in 2004. According to the rules, all nations with the exceptions of the host country, the "Big Four" (France, Germany, Spain and the United Kingdom) and the ten highest placed finishers in the 2003 contest are required to qualify from the semi-final on 12 May 2004 in order to compete for the final on 15 May 2004; the top ten countries from the semi-final progress to the final. On 23 March 2004, an allocation draw was held which determined the running order for the semi-final and Monaco was set to perform in position 9, following the entry from Malta and before the entry from Greece. At the end of the semi-final, Monaco was not announced among the top 10 entries in the semi-final and therefore failed to qualify to compete in the final. It was later revealed that Monaco placed nineteenth in the semi-final, receiving a total of 10 points.

Both the semi-final and the final were broadcast in Monaco on TMC with commentary by Bernard Montiel and Genie Godula. TMC appointed Anne Allegrini as its spokesperson to announce the results of the Monégasque televote during the final.

=== Voting ===
Below is a breakdown of points awarded to Monaco and awarded by Monaco in the semi-final and grand final of the contest. The nation awarded its 12 points to Cyprus in the semi-final and to France in the final of the contest.

In the semi-final, Monaco's vote was based on 100 percent jury voting due to an insufficient number of valid votes cast during the televote period. Following the release of the televoting figures by the EBU after the conclusion of the competition, it was revealed that a total of 110 televotes were cast in Monaco during the two shows, all of them which were cast during the final.

==== Points awarded to Monaco ====
Points awarded to Monaco (Semi-final)
| Score | Country |
|---|---|
| 12 points | |
| 10 points | |
| 8 points | |
| 7 points | |
| 6 points | |
| 5 points | |
| 4 points | Andorra; Cyprus |
| 3 points | |
| 2 points | Albania |
| 1 point | |

==== Points awarded by Monaco ====
Points awarded by Monaco (Semi-final)
| Score | Country |
|---|---|
| 12 points | Cyprus |
| 10 points | Denmark |
| 8 points | Netherlands |
| 7 points | Serbia and Montenegro |
| 6 points | Finland |
| 5 points | Ukraine |
| 4 points | Greece |
| 3 points | Albania |
| 2 points | Latvia |
| 1 point | Portugal |

Points awarded by Monaco (Final)
| Score | Country |
|---|---|
| 12 points | France |
| 10 points | Greece |
| 8 points | Turkey |
| 7 points | Germany |
| 6 points | Ukraine |
| 5 points | Iceland |
| 4 points | Bosnia and Herzegovina |
| 3 points | Spain |
| 2 points | Cyprus |
| 1 point | Serbia and Montenegro |
