= Les Colocataires =

Les Colocataires was a French reality TV program hosted by Frédérique Courtadon and broadcast on the M6 channel from 7 April 2004 to 19 June 2004. The show was produced by W9 Productions.

Sebastien Charbonneau won the prize.

== Principle ==
The game is based on Loft Story in which 7 girls and 7 boys are locked up for 10 weeks under the eye of the cameras, and are eliminated progressively by viewers' votes.

The winner receives €150,000 and three years of rent (€1,500 per month). The pool of winnings was donated to a charity.

To avoid accusations of plagiarism of Endemol, copyright owner of Big Brother and Adapted Loft Story, following the relative failure of Loft Story 2, some original features were introduced that included the candidates being divided into two cities, separated by a wall (the girls on one side, boys on the other) for a few hours a day based on the model of Friends, the inspiration of the show. Candidates were not completely cut off from the world and they were allowed to communicate with their relatives or the public by email or video conferencing, and were able to receive news from the outside world.

== Candidats ==
Housemates	Residence	Occupation	Age
(France) Badice	Lyon	Model	23
(France) Carole	Paris	Student	23
(France) Dijane	Courchevel	Public relations	27
(France) Elodie Franquin	Neuilly sur Seine	Model	24
(France) François	Sainte Maxime	Bartender	25
(France) Gia-Trung Lieu	Asnières sur Seine	Student	19
(France) Gilles	Les Gêts	Skiing monitor	24
(France) Jessyca Falour	Toulouse	Radio presenter	25
(France) Ludovic	Marseille	Teacher	25
(France) Mathieu	Trebeurden	Unemployed	29
(France) Michel Gilliers	Lille	Bar manager	21
(France) Morgane Paton	Bretigny sur Orge	Student	19
(France) Nadia	Saint Ouen	Fashion designer	24
(France) Nordine	Longjumeau	Working in the textile industry	25
(France) Sébastien Charbonneaux	Montpellier	Restaurant manager	23
(Monaco) Vanessa	Monaco	Works at an art gallery	22

== Nominations ==
	Week 1	Week 2	Week 3	Week 4	Week 5	Week 6	Week 7	Week 8	Week 9	Week 10					
Sébastien	Nordine	Mathieu	Mathieu	Gia	Carole	Gia	Gia, Gilles	Gilles	Not; Eligible	Nominated	Not; Eligible	Nominated	Not; Eligible	Winner (Day 73)	
Jessyca	Nadia	Nadia	Élodie	Carole (?)	Michel	Nadia	Michel, Ludovic	Carole (Élodie)	Nominated	Not; Eligible	Nominated	Not; Eligible	Nominated	Runner-Up (Day 73)	
Morgane	Nadia	Vanessa	Vanessa	Vanessa (Jessyca)	François	Jessyca	Gilles, Gia	Jessica (Carole)	Nominated	Not; Eligible	Nominated	Not; Eligible	Nominated	Evicted (Day 71)	
Michel	Nordine	Mathieu	Mathieu	Gia	Carole	Gia	Gia, Gilles	Gilles	Not; Eligible	Nominated	Not; Eligible	Nominated	Evicted (Day 70)		
Élodie	Dijane	Vanessa	Vanessa	Vanessa (Nadia)	Gia	Nadia	Gia, Gilles	Carole (Jessyca)	Nominated	Not; Eligible	Nominated	Evicted (Day 69)			
Ludovic	Nordine	Mathieu	Mathieu	Gia	Carole	Gia	Gia, Gilles	Gilles	Not; Eligible	Nominated	Evicted (Day 68)				
Carole	Dijane	Vanessa	Vanessa	Élodie (Vanessa)	François	Nadia	Gia, Michel	Jessyca (Morgane)	Nominated	Evicted (Day 63)					
Gilles	Gia	Mathieu	Sébastien	Gia	Jessyca	Gia	Gia, Michel	Michel	Evicted (Day 56)						
Gia	Badice	Mathieu	Sébastien	Sébastien	Élodie	Michel	Michel, Ludovic	Evicted (Day 49)							
Nadia	Carole	Jessica	Élodie	Élodie (Jessyca)	François	Élodie	Evicted (Day 42)								
François	Not in the house		Mathieu	Gia	Morgane	Evicted (Day 35)									
Vanessa	Dijane	Élodie	Élodie	Carole (Élodie)	Evicted (Day 28)										
Mathieu	Not in the house	Badice	Sébastien	Evicted (Day 21)											
Badice	Ludovic	Ludovic	Evicted (Day 14)												
Nordine	Ludovic	Evicted (Day 7)													
Dijane	Carole	Evicted (Day 7)													
Lydie	Not in the house	Evicted (Day 7)													
Nominated	Mathieu; Nordine; Dijane; Lydie	Vanessa; Badice	Vanessa; Élodie; Mathieu	Élodie; Gia; Vanessa	Carole; François	Gia; Nadia	Gilles; Gia	Jessyca; Carole; Gilles	Jessyca; Morgane; Élodie; Carole	Michel; Sébastien; Ludovic	Élodie; Morgane; Jessyca	Michel; Sébastien	Jessyca; Morgane	Sébastien; Jessyca	
Evicted	Nordine; 25% to save	Badice; 47% to save	Mathieu; 23% to save	Vanessa; 30% to save	François; 27% to save	Nadia; 38% to save	Gia; 45% to save	Gilles; 24% to save	Carole; 17% to save	Ludovic; 22% to save	Élodie ??% to save	Michel ??% to save	Morgane; 49.9% to save	Jessica; 49.3% to win	Sébastien; 50.7% to win
Evicted	Dijane; 25% to save	Badice; 47% to save	Mathieu; 23% to save	Vanessa; 30% to save	François; 27% to save	Nadia; 38% to save	Gia; 45% to save	Gilles; 24% to save	Carole; 17% to save	Ludovic; 22% to save	Élodie ??% to save	Michel ??% to save	Morgane; 49.9% to save	Jessica; 49.3% to win	Sébastien; 50.7% to win
Evicted	Lydie; 15% to save	Badice; 47% to save	Mathieu; 23% to save	Vanessa; 30% to save	François; 27% to save	Nadia; 38% to save	Gia; 45% to save	Gilles; 24% to save	Carole; 17% to save	Ludovic; 22% to save	Élodie ??% to save	Michel ??% to save	Morgane; 49.9% to save	Jessica; 49.3% to win	Sébastien; 50.7% to win
