= Vincent Cerutti =

French radio and television presenter

- Born: 16 March 1981 (age 44); Le Mans, Sarthe, France
- Occupation(s): Television presenter, radio presenter
- Years active: 2001–present
- Notable credit(s): Sosie ! Or Not Sosie ? Danse avec les stars
- Television: TF1 (2011–present)

Vincent Cerutti (born 16 March 1981) is a French radio and television presenter.

== Radio career ==
At the age of 14, he began his radio career with a training course with community radios. He followed on MFM Radio from 2001 to 2005, on Bel RTL for a few months in 2004, and on Chérie FM in 2007. In summer 2010, he joined the radio station RTL, which gave him the opportunity of two hours of daily presenting from Monday to Friday during both months of July and August. After a break, he made his return on RTL in summer 2011, presenting the programme Stop ou encore, replacing Vincent Perrot, as well as co-hosting Itinéraire d'un auditeur gâté with Jean-Sébastien Petitdemange.

In March 2013, he briefly presented the programme Le Grand Morning on RTL2. Since September 2013, and for one season, he joined the station RFM where he presented the Interview V.I.P., from two to four Friday evenings every month. Since September 2014, he has presented the morning section on Chérie FM.

== Television career ==
In 2000, he was the official speaker of the 24 Hours of Le Mans and then made his television debut on the channel AB Moteurs. He became in 2004 the voice-over of television programmes and documentaries on the Tour de France à la voile. In 2006, he became the presenter and the co-producer of the programme On Fait Le Plein !, 90 minutes in direct every Friday evening on the local channel Le Mans Télévision, broadcast on the DTT of cities like Le Mans, Laval, Angers, Blois and Tours.

In September 2009, Vincent Cerutti joined the team of Morandini ! on channel Direct 8, where he presented a chronicle titled Quiz sur les coulisses des médias and a few reports, a collaboration that he will not follow. In January 2010, for TF1 Production, he is the correspondent backstage of the NRJ Music Awards, where he interviews several personalities.

He then joined the channel TF1 and presented in January 2011 Sosie ! Or Not Sosie ?, a new entertainment programme with sketches filmed in candid camera. The same year, the channel selected him to present Danse avec les stars with Sandrine Quétier, the first season is broadcast in February and March, and the second season in September and October. During his first year on TF1, he presented 17 programmes in total in primetime. He then co-hosted, still with Sandrine Quétier, the following seasons of Danse avec les stars on the same channel until the fifth season in 2014. Since February 2014, he has presented the lottery draw, alternatively with Sandrine Quétier, Estelle Denis, and Jean-Pierre Foucault.

In 2017, he participated in season 8 of Danse avec les stars (the French version of Dancing with the Stars) with his partner Katrina Patchett and finished in last place.

=== Danse avec les stars ===
- In 2017, he participated in season 8 of Danse avec les stars (the French version of Dancing with the Stars) with his partner Katrina Patchett and finished in last place.

This table shows the route of Vincent Cerutti and Katrina Patchett in Danse Avec Les Stars.

Week	Dancing style	Music	Judge points				Total	Ranking	Result
Week	Dancing style	Music	Nicolas Archambault	Jean-Marc Généreux	Fauve Hautot	Chris Marques	Total	Ranking	Result
1	Rumba	J'te mentirais - Patrick Bruel	6	6	6	6	24/40	6=/10	No Elimination
2	Foxtrot	Millésime - Pascal Obispo	5	6	5	4	20/40	9/10	Eliminated
1+2	Foxtrot	Millésime - Pascal Obispo	5	6	5	4	44/80	8/10	Eliminated

== See also ==
- Danse avec les stars
