= Monaco Media Diffusion =

Monaco radio and TV broadcaster

- Formerly: Monte-Carlo Radiodiffusion (1994–2016)
- Industry: Radio and television transmission
- Founded: 1994
- Headquarters: Monaco City, Monaco
- Website: MMD Website

Monaco Media Diffusion (MMD) is a joint-stock company established in 1994. MMD is the only licensee for broadcasting radio and television in Monaco. The national company operates transmitters and distributes licenses and frequencies in consultation with the International Telecommunication Union (ITU). The MMD network broadcasts both digitally, on the FM band, longwave and medium wave from several locations in Monaco and Southern France. MMD is run by a board of six members.

The channels associated with MMD, 23 stations on 30 frequencies, broadcast around the clock and cover the coastal area between Cannes and the border with Italy.

== History ==
MMD was created in 1994 as Monte-Carlo Radiodiffusion (MCR) and is an active member of the European Broadcasting Union (EBU) for the Principality of Monaco alongside Radio Monte-Carlo (RMC) and Télé Monte-Carlo (TMC) which chairs the Group of Monegasque Broadcasters (GRMC). Its name was changed in April 2016 following the majority acquisition of the shareholders, by the Principality of Monaco. The Principality now holds 51% of the capital of this Monegasque company and TDF Group 49%.

== See also ==
- List of radio stations in Monaco
