= Séverine Ferrer =

French singer

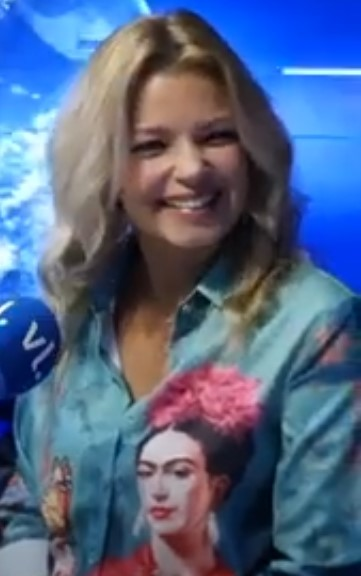
- Ferrer in 2020

Background information
- Born: 31 October 1977 (age 48); Montpellier, France
- Genres: Pop
- Years active: 2004–present

Séverine Ferrer (born 31 October 1977) is a French singer and TV host.

== Biography ==
Ferrer was born in Montpellier and grew up on the island of Réunion. In 1991, Ferrer and her family moved to Paris. She began her career by appearing in television series. In 2004, Ferrer released a new album and a clothing line for pregnant women. Ferrer represented the principality of Monaco with the song "La coco-dance", at the Eurovision Song Contest 2006 but failed to pass through the semi-finals.

== See also ==
- Monaco in the Eurovision Song Contest 2006

Awards and achievements
Preceded by Lise Darly with "Tout de moi"	Monaco in the Eurovision Song Contest; 2006	Succeeded by none
