= Sandrine Quétier =

French television presenter (born 1970)

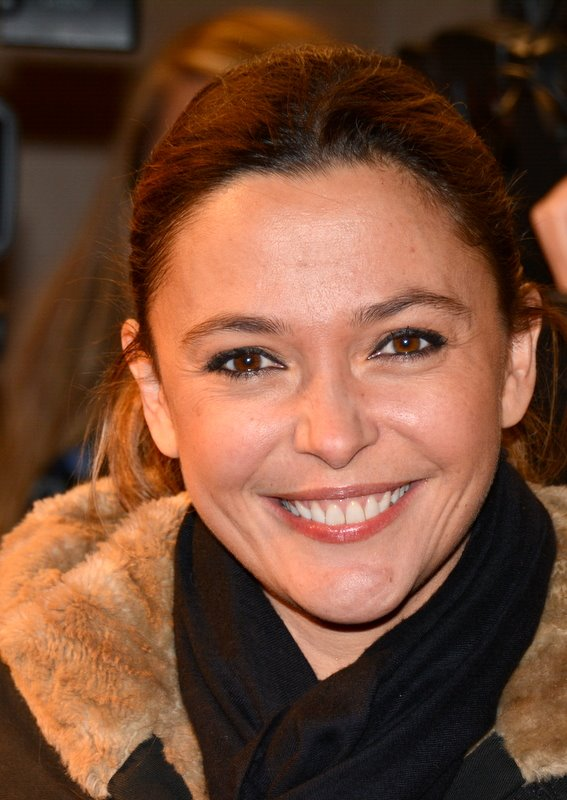
- Quétier in 2013
- Born: 30 December 1970 (age 54); Paris, France
- Occupation: Television presenter
- Years active: 1994–present
- Notable credit(s): 50 minutes inside Danse avec les stars Tout le monde aime la France
- Television: M6 (1997–2002); France 2 (2003–2004); TF1 (2004–2017)

Sandrine Quétier (born 30 December 1970) is a French television presenter.

== Early life ==
Sandrine Quétier was born in Paris and spent her childhood at the Vallée de Chevreuse. She graduated at age 17 with her high school final exam before starting to study.

== Television career ==
After working at the communication department of an optical company, she began her career in 1994 presenting the draw of the game Keno on France 3. She then started presenting on M6 with Politiquement rock from 1997 to 2000, and in the meantime, she presented flashes on M6 Music as well as Le live du vendredi in 1997. From 2000 to 2001, she presented various programs such as Culture pub, Grand écran and Ciné 6. In 2002, in addition to Grand écran, she presented the programs Plus vite que la musique and Sex in the pub.

In 2003 on France 2, she co-hosted Qu'est-ce qui se passe quand ? from September to November. She then co-hosted Le grand examen du savoir vivre in prime time with Thierry Beccaro in December 2003, Les vainqueurs de l'année with Jean-Luc Delarue and Code de la route, le grand examen with Patrice Laffont on 20 June 2004.

From 2004 to 2012, she co-hosted Les 100 plus grands... with Christophe Dechavanne at the first part of the evening on TF1. Since November 2006, she co-hosts 50 minutes inside every Saturday evening with Nikos Aliagas on the same channel. Since September 2006, she is the French presenter of E!, where she presents television and film ceremonies (Oscars, Golden Globes, Deauville Film Festival, Cannes Film Festival), as well as weekly evening specials.

From November 2008 to December 2009, she co-hosted 10 h le mag with Julien Arnaud on TF1. In November 2009, she presented at the first part of the evening Le Plus Grand Quiz de France on the same channel. In December 2009, she presented two evening programs, 120 Minutes Inside with Nikos Aliagas and Chanson de l'année. In February 2010, she started presenting on TF1 at the second part of Friday evening a new interactive documentary titled Link, la vie en face.

In February 2011, she was a contestant at the game show Le Grand Concours des Animateurs on TF1 and was the winner. In September 2012, she participated again and won the contest for the second time. Since February 2011, she co-hosts Danse avec les stars (French version of Dancing with the Stars) with Vincent Cerutti. In July 2011, she presented a special program about the Wedding of Albert II, Prince of Monaco, and Charlene Wittstock on TF1 with Jean-Claude Narcy, Nikos Aliagas, Denis Brogniart and Jean-Pierre Foucault.

In summer 2012 and early 2013, she presented on TF1 a game show titled Tout le monde aime la France in which the contestant are celebrities.
