= Don't Break My Heart (Nicola song) =

Single by Nicoleta Alexandru

Single by Nicola

from the album Best of Nicola and De mă vei chema
- Released: 2003
- Genre: Dance
- Length: 2:59
- Label: Cat
- Songwriter(s): Nicola
- Producer(s): Mihai Alexandru

Nicola singles chronology
"Lângă mine" (2002)	"Don't Break My Heart" (2003)	"De mă vei chema" (2005)

Audio sample
- "Don't Break My Heart": file; help

Eurovision Song Contest 2003 entry
- Country: Romania
- Artist(s): Nicoleta Alexandru
- As: Nicola
- Language: English
- Composer(s): Mihai Alexandru
- Lyricist(s): Nicola

Finals performance
- Final result: 10th
- Final points: 73

Entry chronology
- ◄ "Tell Me Why" (2002)
- "I Admit" (2004) ►

"Don't Break My Heart" is a song recorded by Romanian singer Nicola for her greatest hits album Best of Nicola (2003) and fourth studio album De mă vei chema (2004). Written by Nicola and produced by her then-husband Mihai Alexandru, it was released as a CD single in 2003 by Cat Music. Musically, "Don't Break My Heart" is an uptempo dance recording.

The track represented Romania in the Eurovision Song Contest 2003 in Riga, Latvia after winning the pre-selection show Selecția Națională. In Riga, Nicola was automatically qualified to the Grand Final, where she finished in tenth place with 73 points. During her show, the singer performed in front of background dancers who were rotating overdimensional discs in the colors of the Romanian flag. Although a remix of the song received airplay on multiple radio stations in the United States, it failed to impact any national chart.

== Background and release ==
In 1986, Nicola founded the group Adaggio with Romanian singer Christina Fronea, giving over 200 concerts. She started her solo career in 1988 under the name Nicoleta Nicola, joining the Romanian project Riff. Prior to representing her country at Eurovision, Nicola had taken part in the national selection five times with her first appearance coming in 1992. Written by the singer and produced by her then-husband Mihai Alexandru, "Don't Break My Heart" is an uptempo and modern dance song. Marc Gehring from German website Prinz.de thought that the song was "cool" and labelled it as the first one of its kind to represent Romania at the contest. The single was released as a CD in 2003 by Cat Music, and was later included on Nicola's greatest hits album Best of Nicola (2003) and her fourth studio album De mă vei chema (2004).

== At Eurovision ==
On 1 March 2003, the Selecția Națională was held in order to select the Romanian entrant for the Eurovision Song Contest 2003. For the first time, the show was conducted in several televoting rounds to reach a wider and younger audience. Nicola, one of the favorites to win the national selection, was selected as the country's representative after the votes of a professional jury panel (79 points) and the televoting were added together, resulting in 24 points.

The Eurovision Song Contest 2003 took place at the Skonto Hall in Riga, Latvia and consisted of the final, held on 24 May. According to the then-Eurovision rules, selected countries were picked to participate in the final, including the host country and the "Big Four" (France, Germany, Spain and the United Kingdom). Nicola performed in 24th place in the final — where Romania was automatically qualified due to the top 19 result the previous year — preceded by Estonia and followed by Sweden. During her show, the singer wore a red jacket along with red trousers, and performed in front of four background dancers who rotated overdimensional discs in the colors of the Romanian flag. Gehring from Prinz.de criticised both the outfits and the choreography of the show. The country finished in tenth place with a total of 73 points, including 12 awarded by Russia, ten by Spain and eight by Poland. The Romanian televote awarded its 12 points to Sweden.

=== Results ===
Points awarded to Romania
Score	Country
12 points	Russia
10 points	Spain
8 points	Poland
7 points	Bosnia and Herzegovina
6 points	Austria; Israel; Ukraine
5 points	
4 points	France; Germany; Greece
3 points	
2 points	Cyprus
1 point	Croatia; Norway; Sweden; Turkey

== Track listing ==
- Romanian CD single
1. "Don't Break My Heart" – 2:59

== Release history ==
Country	Date	Format	Label
Romania	N/A 2003	Promotional CD single	Cat
