= United Kingdom in the Eurovision Song Contest 2003 =

- Eurovision Song Contest 2003
- Participating broadcaster: British Broadcasting Corporation (BBC)
- Country: United Kingdom
- Selection process: A Song for Europe 2003
- Selection date: 2 March 2003

Competing entry
- Song: "Cry Baby"
- Artist: Jemini
- Songwriter: Martin Isherwood

Placement
- Final result: 26th, 0 points

Participation chronology

The United Kingdom was represented at the Eurovision Song Contest 2003 with the song "Cry Baby", written by Martin Isherwood, and performed by the duo Jemini. The British participating broadcaster, the British Broadcasting Corporation (BBC), organised a public selection process to determine its entry for the contest, A Song for Europe 2003. Eight acts competed in the national final which consisted of a semi-final and a final, during which the winner was selected entirely through a regional televote.

In the final of the Eurovision Song Contest, the United Kingdom performed in position 15 and placed twenty-sixth (last) out of the 26 participating countries, failing to score any points. This was the first time that the British entry had placed last in the history of the competition and also the first time it received nul points.

== Background ==
Prior to the 2003 contest, British Broadcasting Corporation (BBC) had participated in the Eurovision Song Contest representing the United Kingdom forty-five times. Thus far, it has won the contest five times: in 1967 with the song "Puppet on a String" performed by Sandie Shaw, in 1969 with the song "Boom Bang-a-Bang" performed by Lulu, in 1976 with "Save Your Kisses for Me" performed by Brotherhood of Man, in 1981 with the song "Making Your Mind Up" performed by Bucks Fizz, and in 1997 with the song "Love Shine a Light" performed by Katrina and the Waves. To this point, the nation is noted for having finished as the runner-up in a record fifteen contests. Up to and including 1998, it had only twice finished outside the top 10, in 1978 and in 1987. Since 1999, the year in which the rule was abandoned that songs must be performed in one of the official languages of the country participating, it has had less success, thus far only finishing within the top ten once: in 2002 with the song "Come Back" performed by Jessica Garlick.

As part of its duties as participating broadcaster, the BBC organises the selection of its entry in the Eurovision Song Contest and broadcasts the event in the country. The broadcaster announced that it would participate in the 2003 contest on 3 September 2002. BBC has traditionally organised a national final featuring a competition among several artists and songs to choose its entry for Eurovision. The broadcaster announced that it would held a national final involving a public vote to select its 2003 entry.

== Before Eurovision ==
=== A Song for Europe 2003 ===
A Song for Europe 2003 was the national final developed by the BBC in order to select its entry for the Eurovision Song Contest 2003. Eight acts competed in the competition which consisted of a radio semi-final on 31 January 2003 and a televised final on 2 March 2003. The semi-final was broadcast on BBC Radio 2, while the final was broadcast on BBC One.

==== Competing entries ====
On 3 September 2002, BBC together with the British Academy of Songwriters, Composers and Authors (BASCA) announced an open submission for interested songwriters to submit their songs. The BBC stated that they would seek out songs "that work instantly rather than be a slow burner" and "that is not typically a Eurovision song". A fee was also imposed on songs being submitted to the national final: £40 for BASCA members, £60 for non-BASCA members and £10 for songwriters under the age of 17. The submission period lasted until 18 October 2002. The 700 received submissions were reviewed and a shortlist was presented to a professional panel consisting of representatives of BASCA and the BBC as well as music industry experts that ultimately selected eight semi-finalists to compete in the national final. The eight competing songs were premiered during The Ken Bruce Show on BBC Radio 2 between 27 and 30 February 2003.

==== Semi-final ====
Eight acts competed in the radio semi-final which was hosted by Terry Wogan and Ken Bruce during Wake Up to Wogan on 31 January 2003. A public vote consisting of televoting and online voting, which registered over 30,000 votes, selected the top four songs that proceeded to the final.

Semi-final – 31 January 2003
R/O	Artist	Song	Songwriter(s)	Result
1	Fenix	"Do Anything for Your Love"	Morten Schjolin; Giacomo Barba	—N/a
2	Mimi	"Ever Since That Night"	John Brant; Simon May	Qualified
3	S.K	"First Night"	Neville Henry; Jackie Rawe; Karen Gibbs	—N/a
4	Esther Hart	"Wait for the Moment"	Danny Davies	Qualified
5	Tricity	"Cry Baby"	Martin Isherwood	Qualified
6	Emily Reed	"Help Me"	Simon Hill	Qualified
7	Gallico	"Smile"	Ashley Dylan Best; Samuel John Roberts	—N/a
8	Ben Plus One	"Rainy Day in Summer"	Alan Simpson; Maryanne Morgan	—N/a

==== Final ====
Four acts competed in the televised final on 2 March 2003 which was held at the BBC Television Centre in London and hosted by Terry Wogan. Before the final, Tricity was renamed as Jemini, while the song "Wait for the Moment" was rewritten and retitled as "Now and Forever" with its performer being changed from Esther Hart, who withdrew in favour of competing in the Dutch national final (where she eventually won), to Simon Chapman. The group United Colours of Sound was originally announced as Hart's replacement before they also withdrew and were replaced in turn by Chapman.

A regional televote selected the winner, "Cry Baby" performed by Jemini. The respective spokespersons for the results in Southern England, Wales, Northern Ireland, Midlands, Northern England and Scotland were: Esther Rantzen, Jessica Garlick, Joe Mace, Mel and Sue, Matt Baker, and Nicholas Parsons. The televote in the final registered over 100,000 votes, with Emily Reed reported to have received the most overall votes.

Final – 2 March 2003
R/O	Artist	Song	Televoting regions						Total	Place
R/O	Artist	Song	Southern England	Wales	Northern Ireland	Midlands	Northern England	Scotland	Total	Place
1	Jemini	"Cry Baby"	10	12	12	10	12	12	68	1
2	Simon Chapman	"Now and Forever"							0	4
3	Mimi	"Ever Since That Night"	9	9	9	9	9	9	54	3
4	Emily Reed	"Help Me"	12	10	10	12	10	10	64	2

===== 12 points =====
N.	Song	Regions giving 12 points
4	"Cry Baby"	Northern England, Northern Ireland, Scotland, Wales
2	"Help Me"	Midlands, Southern England

== At Eurovision ==
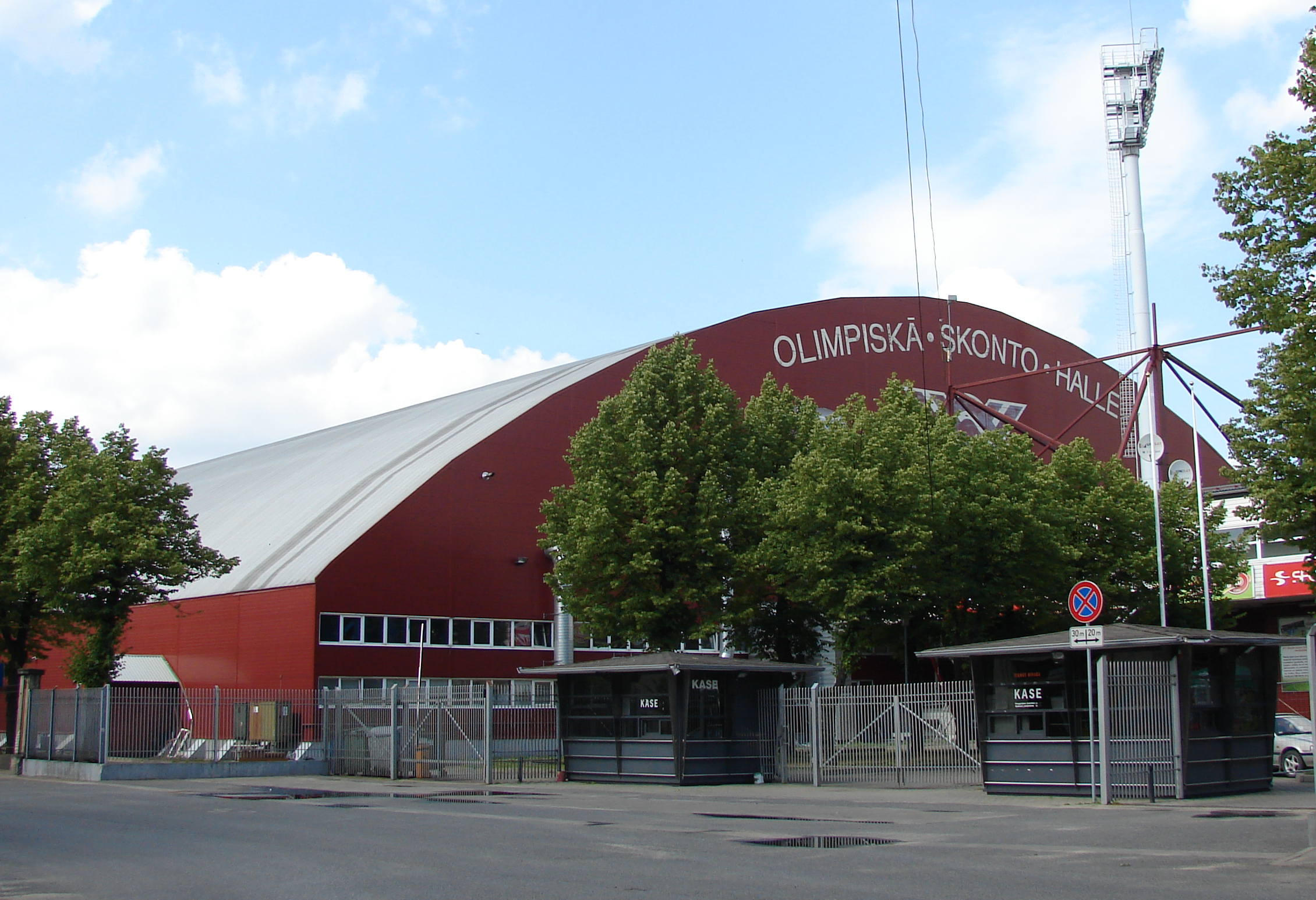
The Eurovision Song Contest 2003 took place at Skonto Hall in Riga, Latvia.

The Eurovision Song Contest 2003 took place at the Skonto Hall in Riga, Latvia, on 24 May 2003. According to Eurovision rules, the participant list for the contest was composed of: the host country, the "Big Four" (France, Germany, Spain and the United Kingdom), the fifteen highest-scoring participating countries in the previous year's contest and any non-participating countries in the previous year's contest, up to the maximum 26 participants in total. As a member of the "Big Four", the United Kingdom automatically qualified to compete in the contest. On 29 November 2002, an allocation draw was held which determined the running order and the United Kingdom was set to perform in position 15, following the entry from the Netherlands and before the entry from Ukraine. The United Kingdom finished in twenty-sixth (last) place and failed to score any points. This was the first time the United Kingdom finished in last place and also the first time the nation received nul points.

The United Kingdom's last-place finish was greeted with much consternation in the British media. Terry Wogan, who commentated the contest on BBC One, said that "the UK is suffering from post-Iraq backlash". Jemini attributed their failure at the contest to technical problems. Member Chris Cromby said: "The monitors were off. Maybe it was sabotage, but we couldn't hear anything... we used the floor monitors, the others used their own."

In addition to BBC One, BBC Radio 2 also broadcast the contest with commentary by Ken Bruce. The BBC appointed Lorraine Kelly as its spokesperson to announce the results of the British televote during the show.

=== Voting ===
Below is a breakdown of points awarded to the United Kingdom and awarded by the United Kingdom in the contest. The nation awarded its 12 points to Ireland in the contest. It was later revealed that Turkey would have been awarded with 12 points from the nation had a backup jury be used.

==== Points awarded to the United Kingdom ====
The United Kingdom did not receive any points at the Eurovision Song Contest 2003.

==== Points awarded by the United Kingdom ====
Points awarded by the United Kingdom
Score	Country
12 points	Ireland
10 points	Sweden
8 points	Austria
7 points	Turkey
6 points	Norway
5 points	Belgium
4 points	Germany
3 points	Estonia
2 points	Poland
1 point	Netherlands

Detailed televoting results from the United Kingdom
R/O	Country	Televotes	Rank	Points
01	Iceland	23,333	13	
02	Austria	40,521	3	8
03	Ireland	86,653	1	12
04	Turkey	37,280	4	7
05	Malta	16,763	15	
06	Bosnia and Herzegovina	3,845	25	
07	Portugal	10,057	19	
08	Croatia	8,762	21	
09	Cyprus	15,892	17	
10	Germany	29,706	7	4
11	Russia	23,497	12	
12	Spain	16,131	16	
13	Israel	9,415	20	
14	Netherlands	24,269	10	1
15	United Kingdom			
16	Ukraine	6,528	23	
17	Greece	24,027	11	
18	Norway	31,050	5	6
19	France	7,244	22	
20	Poland	25,972	9	2
21	Latvia	11,344	18	
22	Belgium	30,631	6	5
23	Estonia	26,563	8	3
24	Romania	17,957	14	
25	Sweden	41,099	2	10
26	Slovenia	5,976	24	
