= Germany in the Eurovision Song Contest 2003 =

- Eurovision Song Contest 2003
- Participating broadcaster: ARD (Note: Arbeitsgemeinschaft der öffentlich-rechtlichen Rundfunkanstalten der Bundesrepublik Deutschland) – Norddeutscher Rundfunk (NDR)
- Country: Germany
- Selection process: Countdown Grand Prix Eurovision 2003
- Selection date: 7 March 2003

Competing entry
- Song: "Let's Get Happy"
- Artist: Lou
- Songwriters: Ralph Siegel; Bernd Meinunger

Placement
- Final result: 11th, 53 points

Participation chronology

Germany was represented at the Eurovision Song Contest 2003 with the song "Let's Get Happy", composed by Ralph Siegel, with lyrics by Bernd Meinunger, and performed by Louise Hoffner, more commonly referred to as Lou. The German participating broadcaster on behalf of ARD, Norddeutscher Rundfunk (NDR), organised the national final Countdown Grand Prix Eurovision 2003 in order to select their entry for the contest. The national final took place on 7 March 2003 and featured fourteen competing acts with the winner being selected through two rounds of public voting. "Let's Get Happy" performed by Lou was selected as the German entry after placing second in the top three during the first round of voting and ultimately gaining 38% of the vote in the second round.

In the final of the Eurovision Song Contest, Germany performed in position 10 and placed eleventh out of the 26 participating countries with 53 points.

== Background ==
Prior to the 2003 contest, ARD had participated in the Eurovision Song Contest representing Germany forty-six times since its debut in 1956. It has won the contest on one occasion: in 1982 with the song "Ein bißchen Frieden" performed by Nicole. Germany, to this point, has been noted for having appeared in the contest more than any other country; they have competed in every contest since the first edition in 1956 except for 1996 when it was eliminated in a pre-contest elimination round. In 2002, the German entry "I Can't Live Without Music" performed by Corinna May placed twenty-first out of twenty-four competing songs scoring 21 points.

As part of its duties as participating broadcaster, ARD organises the selection of its entry in the Eurovision Song Contest and broadcasts the event in the country. Since 1996, ARD had delegated the participation in the contest to its member Norddeutscher Rundfunk (NDR). NDR had set up national finals with several artists to choose both the song and performer to compete at Eurovision for Germany. The broadcaster organised a multi-artist national final in cooperation to select its entry for the 2003 contest. Following the 2002 contest, head of German delegation for Eurovision Jürgen Meier-Beer stated: "This defeat gives me the chance to make people separate from the old image of the song contest in Germany too. Esthetically, we want to make a huge jump from old-fashioned schlager to modern pop music".

== Before Eurovision ==
=== Countdown Grand Prix Eurovision 2003 ===
Cover of the Countdown Grand Prix Eurovision 2003 compilation album

Countdown Grand Prix Eurovision 2003 was the competition organised by NDR to select its entry for the Eurovision Song Contest 2003. The competition took place on 7 March 2003 at the Ostseehalle in Kiel, hosted by Axel Bulthaupt. Fourteen acts competed during the show with the winner being selected through a public televote. The show was broadcast on Das Erste as well as online via the broadcaster's Eurovision Song Contest website grandprix2003.de. The show was also broadcast in Poland on TVP1 and in Latvia on LTV1. The national final was watched by 5.64 million viewers in Germany with a market share of 18.1%.

==== Competing entries ====
15 acts were selected by a panel consisting of representatives of NDR from proposals received by the broadcaster from record companies as well as German newspapers and magazines. The 15 competing artists were announced on 11 January 2003 during a press conference at the Schmidt Theatre in Hamburg and among the acts was the band Ich Troje which were selected before the competition to represent Poland in 2003, meaning they would not be allowed to represent Germany according to Eurovision rules. Five of the acts were proposed by German newspapers and magazines: Der Junge mit der Gitarre (Frankfurter Allgemeine Sonntagszeitung), Die Gerd Show (Bild), Freistil (Yam!), Senait (Die Tageszeitung) and Tagträumer featuring Aynur Aydın (Hürriyet). On 21 January 2003, "Marie", written and to have been performed by Joachim Deutschland, was disqualified from the competition after the revelation that the artist had insulted the Bavarian minister-president Edmund Stoiber in one of his other songs and due to the song containing inappropriate lyrics.

Key: Disqualified

Artist	Song	Songwriter(s)
Beatbetrieb	"Woran glaubst du?"	Theo Eißler, Michael Janz, Derek von Krogh, Tobi Wörner
Charlemaine	"Life"	Peter Ries, Charlemaine
Elija	"Somehow, Somewhere"	André Franke, William Lennox
Freistil	"Hörst du meine Lieder?"	Nico Sukup, Philip Schmid, Simon Schmid, Fabian Keitel, Dieter Falk
Die Gerd Show	"Alles wird gut"	Elmar Brandt, Peter Burtz, Dieter Müller-Christ, Frank Kurt-Meyer, Michael Kernbach
Isgaard	"Golden Key"	Jens Lück, Sabina Lück
Joachim Deutschland	"Marie"	Joachim Deutschland
Der Junge mit der Gitarre	"Die Seite, wo die Sonne scheint"	Tobias Schacht, Octopussy
Lou	"Let's Get Happy"	Ralph Siegel, Bernd Meinunger
Lovecrush	"Love Is Life"	Sabine Mayer-Foster, Peter Bischof-Fallenstein
Sascha Pierro	"Wenn Grenzen fallen"	Sascha Pierro, Patrick Benzer, Peter Hoffmann
Senait	"Herz aus Eis"	Senait Mehari, Frank Ramond, Oliver Pinelli
Tagträumer feat. Aynur Aydın	"Living in a Perfect World (Mükemmel Dünya İçin)"	Andy Jonas, Arno Brugger
Ich Troje	"Liebe macht Spaß"	André Franke, Joachim Horn-Bernges
Vibe	"Für immer"	Daniel Biscan, Philipp Palm, Julian Maas

==== Final ====
The televised final took place on 7 March 2003. The winner was selected through two rounds of public televoting, including options for landline and SMS voting. In the first round of voting, the top three entries were selected to proceed to the second round. In the second round, the winner, "Let's Get Happy" performed by Lou, was selected. In addition to the performances of the competing entries, Marie N (who won Eurovision for Latvia in 2002), performed her entry "I Wanna", while the German music duo Modern Talking performed their new song "TV Makes the Superstar". 601,809 votes were cast in the first round, and 367,475 votes were cast in the second round.

First Round – 7 March 2003
R/O	Artist	Song	Televote	Place
1	Sascha Pierro	"Wenn Grenzen fallen"	—	10
2	Charlemaine	"Life"	—	12
3	Der Junge mit der Gitarre	"Die Seite, wo die Sonne scheint"	—	13
4	Lou	"Let's Get Happy"	85,984	2
5	Elija	"Somehow - Somewhere"	—	9
6	Beatbetrieb	"Woran glaubst du?"	66,418	3
7	Isgaard	"Golden Key"	—	7
8	Vibe	"Für immer"	—	8
9	Ich Troje	"Liebe macht Spaß"	—	6
10	Lovecrush	"Love Is Life"	—	14
11	Die Gerd Show	"Alles wird gut"	98,455	1
12	Senait	"Herz aus Eis"	—	4
13	Freistil	"Hörst du meine Lieder?"	—	11
14	Tagträumer feat. Aynur Aydın	"Living in a Perfect World (Mükemmel Dünya İçin)"	—	5

Second Round – 7 March 2003
R/O	Artist	Song	Televote	Place
1	Lou	"Let's Get Happy"	139,660	1
2	Beatbetrieb	"Woran glaubst du?"	116,214	2
3	Die Gerd Show	"Alles wird gut"	111,601	3

=== Chart release ===
Like every year since 1996, a compilation CD with all entries was released. The CD also included the 2002 German entry "I Can't Live Without Music" by Corinna May as well as the winning song of the 2002 Eurovision Song Contest "I Wanna" by Marie N. For the first time since 1999, the winning song failed to enter the German singles charts with only two of the fourteen songs reaching the top 100: "Alles wird gut" by Die Gerd Show at #18 and "Woran glaubst Du?" by Beatbetrieb at #80. The disqualified entry "Marie" by Joachim Deutschland, also reached the top 100 at #32.

== At Eurovision ==
As a member of the "Big Four", Germany automatically qualified to compete in the Eurovision Song Contest 2003 on 24 May 2003. During the allocation draw on 29 November 2002, Germany was drawn to perform in position 10, following the entry from Cyprus and before the entry from Russia. At the conclusion of the final, Germany placed eleventh in the final, scoring 53 points.

In Germany, the show was broadcast on Das Erste which featured commentary by Peter Urban, as well as on Deutschlandfunk and NDR 2 which featured commentary by Thomas Mohr. The show was watched by 8.92 million viewers in Germany, which meant a market share of 39 per cent.

=== Voting ===
Below is a breakdown of points awarded to Germany and awarded by Germany in the contest. The nation awarded its 12 points to Poland in the contest. NDR appointed Axel Bulthaupt as its spokesperson to announce the top 12-point score awarded by the German televote.

Points awarded to Germany
Score	Country
12 points	
10 points	Sweden
8 points	Iceland
7 points	Russia
6 points	
5 points	Poland
4 points	Ireland; Spain; United Kingdom
3 points	Malta
2 points	Estonia; Latvia; Netherlands
1 point	Austria; Romania

Points awarded by Germany
Score	Country
12 points	Poland
10 points	Turkey
8 points	Russia
7 points	Norway
6 points	Belgium
5 points	Greece
4 points	Romania
3 points	Sweden
2 points	Austria
1 point	Iceland
