= Nicoleta Alexandru =

Romanian singer (born 1968)

Nicola
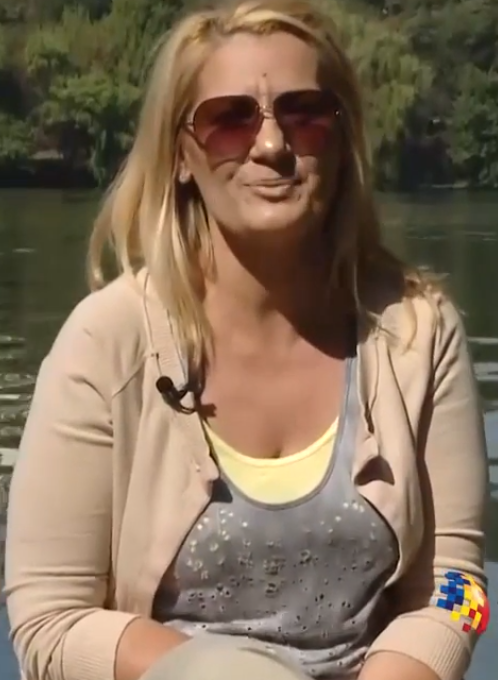
- Nicola in a promotional image for the album De mă vei chema

Background information
- Born: Nicoleta Alexandru; 5 November 1968 (age 57); Bucharest, Romania
- Genres: Dance, Pop, Pop rock
- Occupation: Singer
- Years active: 1985–present
- Labels: MediaPro Music (1998–1999); Cat Music (2000–2005); MediaPro Music (2009–present)

Nicoleta Alexandru (Romanian pronunciation: [nikoˈleta alekˈsandru]; born 5 November 1968), known professionally as Nicola (Romanian pronunciation: [niˈkola]), is a Romanian singer. She represented Romania at the Eurovision Song Contest 2003 with the song "Don't Break My Heart", finishing tenth in the final.

== Early life ==
Nicoleta Alexandru was born in Bucharest, Romania.

== Career ==
Alexandru began her solo career in 1992, performing in concerts and making television, radio and stage appearances.

In 2003, she received the Woman of the Year award from Avantaje magazine. Her song "Lângă mine" was named Song of the Year by Radio București and Radio Actualități, while she also received awards at the Mamaia Music Festival and the Love Song Festival.

On 1 March 2003, she won the Romanian national selection for the Eurovision Song Contest 2003 with "Don't Break My Heart". At the international final, she placed tenth.

Later that year, she released the compilation album Best of Nicola, which achieved platinum certification in Romania. She also won the Best Female award at the TV K Lumea Awards.

In January 2005, Nicola released the album De mă vei chema, featuring the singles "De mă vei chema" and "Honey". The music video for the title track featured members of her backing band, including Andrei Stanoevici, Cătălin Dalvarea, Ștefan Corbu and music producer Mihai Alexandru.

At the MTV Romania Music Awards 2005, she won the Best Female award.

In 2007, she released the single "Doar noi doi", whose music video was filmed in Barcelona, Spain. Later that year, she released the single "Dacă-i târziu".

Her song "Fairytale Story" competed in the Romanian national selection for the Eurovision Song Contest 2008, finishing seventh. In late 2008, she released the single "Leave No Heart Behind", written by Thomas Nichols.

On 21 August 2009, Nicola released the album Thank You. The lead single, "My Love", was recorded in collaboration with Kord and received a music video directed by Dragoș Buliga.

== Personal life ==
Alexandru was married to composer and music producer Mihai Alexandru. The couple divorced in 2005 after approximately fifteen years together.

They have two children.

Following her divorce, Alexandru maintained a lower public profile while continuing her music career and focusing on family life. She has continued to perform and make television appearances.

== Discography ==
=== Albums ===
- Cu tălpile goale (1999)
- Turquoise (2000)
- Lângă mine (2002)
- Best of Nicola (2003)
- De mă vei chema (2005)
- Thank You (2009)

Awards and achievements
Preceded by Monica Anghel & Marcel Pavel with "Tell Me Why"	Romania in the Eurovision Song Contest; 2003	Succeeded by Sanda with "I Admit"
