= Poland in the Eurovision Song Contest 2003 =

- Eurovision Song Contest 2003
- Participating broadcaster: Telewizja Polska (TVP)
- Country: Poland
- Selection process: Krajowe Eliminacje do Konkursu Piosenki Eurowizji 2003
- Selection date: 25 January 2003

Competing entry
- Song: "Keine Grenzen – Żadnych granic"
- Artist: Ich Troje
- Songwriters: André Franke; Joachim Horn-Bernges; Michał Wiśniewski; Jacek Łągwa

Placement
- Final result: 7th, 90 points

Participation chronology

Poland was represented at the Eurovision Song Contest 2003 with the song "Keine Grenzen – Żadnych granic", written by André Franke, Joachim Horn-Bernges, Michał Wiśniewski, and Jacek Łągwa, and performed by the band Ich Troje. The Polish participating broadcaster, Telewizja Polska (TVP), organised the national final Krajowe Eliminacje do Konkursu Piosenki Eurowizji 2003 in order to select its entry for the contest. The broadcaster returned to the contest after a one-year absence following its relegation in 2002 as one of the bottom six entrants in 2001. The national final took place on 25 January 2003 and featured fourteen entries. "Keine Grenzen – Żadnych granic" performed by Ich Troje was selected as the winner after gaining 31.8% of the public vote.

Poland competed in the Eurovision Song Contest which took place on 24 May 2003. Performing during the show in position 20, Poland placed seventh out of the 26 participating countries, scoring 90 points.

== Background ==
Prior to the 2003 Contest, Telewizja Polska (TVP) had participated in the Eurovision Song Contest representing Poland seven times since its first entry in 1994. Its highest placement in the contest, to this point, has been second place, achieved with its debut entry in 1994 with the song "To nie ja!" performed by Edyta Górniak.

As part of its duties as participating broadcaster, TVP organises the selection of its entry in the Eurovision Song Contest and broadcasts the event in the country. The broadcaster confirmed its participation in the 2003 contest on 19 September 2002. Since 1994, the broadcaster opted to internally select its entries. However, along with its participation confirmation, TVP announced that it would select its entry for the 2003 contest via a national final for the first time.

== Before Eurovision ==
=== Krajowe Eliminacje do Konkursu Piosenki Eurowizji 2003 ===
Krajowe Eliminacje do Konkursu Piosenki Eurowizji 2003 was the national final organised by TVP in order to select its entry for the Eurovision Song Contest 2003. The broadcaster hold the show on 25 January 2003 at its Studio 5 in Warsaw, hosted by Artur Orzech. Public televoting exclusively selected the winner. The show was broadcast on TVP1 and TVP Polonia as well as via radio on Radio Eska. The national final was watched by 7.27 million viewers in Poland with a market share of 46%.

==== Competing entries ====
TVP opened a submission period for interested artists and songwriters to submit their entries between 19 September 2002 and 15 November 2002. The broadcaster received 43 submissions at the closing of the deadline. A six-member selection committee selected fifteen entries from the received submissions to compete in the national final. The selection committee consisted of Janusz Kosiński (journalist), Zygmunt Kukla (conductor, composer), Leszek Kumański (TV director, screenwriter and producer), Marek Sierocki (Head of Entertainment of TVP1 and artistic directors of the Opole Festival and Sopot Festival), Hirek Wrona (journalist) and Piotr Klatt (musician, songwriter, journalist and music producer at TVP). The selected entries were announced on 30 November 2002. On 11 December 2002, "Pierwszy raz", written by Piotr Rubik and Jolanta Literska and to have been performed by Georgina Tarasiuk, was disqualified from the national final due to the singer not being aged at least 16 on the day of the Eurovision Song Contest 2003.

==== Final ====
The televised final took place on 25 January 2003. Fourteen entries competed and the winner, "Keine Grenzen – Żadnych granic" performed by Ich Troje, was determined entirely by a public vote. In addition to the performances of the competing entries, Edyta Górniak (who represented Poland in 1994) opened the show with her new single "Impossible", while the band Bajm performed as the interval act.

Final – 25 January 2003
| R/O | Artist | Song | Songwriter(s) | Televote | Place |
|---|---|---|---|---|---|
| 1 | Adieu | "Time" | Robert Janson | — | — |
| 2 | Benedek | "Here Comes Your Time" | Jan Benedek | — | — |
| 3 | Blue Café | "You May Be in Love" | Tatiana Okupnik, Paweł Rurak-Sokal | 17.2% | 3 |
| 4 | Bracia Cugowscy | "Missing Every Moment" | Wojtek Cugowski | — | — |
| 5 | Magda Femme and Spotlight | "I Believe in You" | Tomasz Lubert, Anna Celinska, Magda Femme | — | — |
| 6 | Gosia | "Remember" | Gosia Orczyk | — | — |
| 7 | Ha-Dwa-O | "Tylko bądź" | Tomek Konfederak, Bartek Wielgosz, Sonia Neumann | — | — |
| 8 | Ich Troje | "Keine Grenzen – Żadnych granic" | André Franke, Joachim Horn-Bernges, Michał Wiśniewski, Jacek Łągwa | 31.8% | 1 |
| 9 | Ira | "Femme Fatale" | Zdzislaw Zabierzewski | — | — |
| 10 | Ocean Front | "Zakochany" | Mark Kocikiewicz | — | — |
| 11 | Stachursky | "Tam gdzie ty" | Jacek Laszczok, Daniel Maczura, Mietek Jurecki | — | — |
| 12 | Varius Manx | "Sonny" | Olissa Rae-Remiszewska, Robert Janson | — | — |
| 13 | Wilki | "Here I Am" | Monika Gawlińska, Robert Gawliński | 29.2% | 2 |
| 14 | Zdobywcy Pewnych Oskarów | "Pia" | Wojciech Jan Pytkowski, Marcin Ciepiel | — | — |

==== Controversy ====
Following the Polish national final, it was revealed that approximately 300,000 votes were submitted by the public with less than 25% being successfully transmitted and registered during the 15-minute voting window, due to the system operated by the telecom provider being overwhelmed by the high influx of votes. Following media and public inquiries, TVP published the voting percentage of the top three entries with the addition of the delayed votes on 27 January, which revealed that the results remain unchanged despite the margin between the top two entries being shortened. Unconfirmed reports also suggested that Varius Manx, Bracia Cugowscy and Ha-Dwa-O had placed fourth to sixth, respectively.

== At Eurovision ==
According to Eurovision rules, all nations with the exceptions of the bottom ten countries in the 2002 contest competed in the final on 24 May 2003. On 29 November 2002, an allocation draw was held which determined the running order and Poland was set to perform in position 20, following the entry from France and before the entry from Latvia. Poland finished in seventh place with 70 points.

The show was broadcast in Poland on TVP1 and TVP Polonia with commentary by Artur Orzech.

=== Voting ===
Below is a breakdown of points awarded to Poland and awarded by Poland in the contest. The nation awarded its 12 points to Belgium in the contest. TVP appointed Maciej Orłoś as its spokesperson to announce the Polish votes during the show.

Points awarded to Poland
| Score | Country |
|---|---|
| 12 points | Germany |
| 10 points | Austria; Malta |
| 8 points | Latvia; Ukraine |
| 7 points | |
| 6 points | Greece |
| 5 points | Belgium; France; Spain |
| 4 points | Estonia; Netherlands; Norway; Romania |
| 3 points | Sweden |
| 2 points | United Kingdom |
| 1 point | |

Points awarded by Poland
| Score | Country |
|---|---|
| 12 points | Belgium |
| 10 points | Ukraine |
| 8 points | Romania |
| 7 points | Sweden |
| 6 points | Norway |
| 5 points | Germany |
| 4 points | Russia |
| 3 points | France |
| 2 points | Turkey |
| 1 point | Iceland |

==== Detailed voting results ====
TVP opted to use exclusively SMS voting to determine the points awarded by Poland in the contest. Broadcasters were required to assemble back-up juries that consisted of eight voting members, with age and gender equally distributed, in the case of televote failure on the night of the competition. The Polish back-up jury consisted of Marta Gach, Piotr Rzeczycki, Dorota Miśkiewicz, Krzysztof Wydrzycki, Agnieszka Olszewska, Tomasz Augustyniak, Aneta Strypikowska and Zygmunt Kukla, with Janusz Kosiński as the jury chairperson. The top three countries, as ranked by the Polish back-up jury, were later revealed by TVP: Estonia was ranked as the jury's collective favourite, followed by Belgium and Portugal in second and third place, respectively.

National juries and the public in each country are not allowed to vote for their own country, a rule first introduced in 1957. However, 19,894 votes for the Polish entry were still recorded in Poland, which were deemed invalid.

Detailed televoting results from Poland
| R/O | Country | Televotes | Rank | Points |
|---|---|---|---|---|
| 01 | Iceland | 3,630 | 10 | 1 |
| 02 | Austria | 3,617 | 11 | |
| 03 | Ireland | 2,838 | 15 | |
| 04 | Turkey | 3,901 | 9 | 2 |
| 05 | Malta | 2,081 | 20 | |
| 06 | Bosnia and Herzegovina | 876 | 25 | |
| 07 | Portugal | 2,011 | 21 | |
| 08 | Croatia | 1,762 | 24 | |
| 09 | Cyprus | 2,602 | 16 | |
| 10 | Germany | 7,435 | 6 | 5 |
| 11 | Russia | 6,833 | 7 | 4 |
| 12 | Spain | 3,395 | 13 | |
| 13 | Israel | 1,840 | 23 | |
| 14 | Netherlands | 3,342 | 14 | |
| 15 | United Kingdom | 1,956 | 22 | |
| 16 | Ukraine | 9,772 | 2 | 10 |
| 17 | Greece | 2,204 | 19 | |
| 18 | Norway | 7,680 | 5 | 6 |
| 19 | France | 4,253 | 8 | 3 |
| 20 | Poland | | | |
| 21 | Latvia | 2,205 | 18 | |
| 22 | Belgium | 11,018 | 1 | 12 |
| 23 | Estonia | 3,471 | 12 | |
| 24 | Romania | 9,149 | 3 | 8 |
| 25 | Sweden | 9,096 | 4 | 7 |
| 26 | Slovenia | 2,215 | 17 | |
