= Belgium in the Eurovision Song Contest 2003 =

- Eurovision Song Contest 2003
- Participating broadcaster: Radio-télévision belge de la Communauté française (RTBF)
- Country: Belgium
- Selection process: Internal selection
- Announcement date: Artist: 18 December 2002; Song: 31 March 2003

Competing entry
- Song: "Sanomi"
- Artist: Urban Trad
- Songwriter: Yves Barbieux

Placement
- Final result: 2nd, 165 points

Participation chronology

Belgium was represented at the Eurovision Song Contest 2003 with the song "Sanomi", written by Yves Barbieux, and performed by the group Urban Trad. The Belgian participating broadcaster, Walloon Radio-télévision belge de la Communauté française (RTBF), internally selected in December 2002 its entry for the contest. The song, "Sanomi", was presented to the public on 31 March 2003. This was the first-ever entry performed in a constructed language in the Eurovision Song Contest.

Belgium competed in the Eurovision Song Contest which took place on 24 May 2003. Performing during the show in position 22, Belgium placed second out of the 26 participating countries, scoring 165 points. This was Belgium's best result in the contest since their victory in 1986.

== Background ==
Prior to the 2003 contest, Belgium had participated in the Eurovision Song Contest forty-four times since its debut as one of seven countries to take part in 1956. Since then, the country has won the contest on one occasion in 1986 with the song "J'aime la vie" performed by Sandra Kim. In 2002, the song "Sister" performed by Sergio and the Ladies placed thirteenth.

The Belgian participation in the contest alternates between two broadcasters: Flemish Vlaamse Radio- en Televisieomroeporganisatie (VRT) and Walloon Radio-télévision belge de la Communauté française (RTBF) at the time, with both broadcasters sharing the broadcasting rights. Both broadcasters –and their predecessors– had selected the Belgian entry using national finals and internal selections in the past. RTBF in 2000 and VRT in 2002, both organised a national final in order to select their entries. On 18 December 2002, RTBF –who had the turn– confirmed its participation in the 2003 contest having internally selected both the artist and song.

== Before Eurovision ==
=== Internal selection ===
RTBF internally selected its entry for the Eurovision Song Contest 2003. RTBF asked record companies which records by Belgian artists will soon be on the market so that they can scout them for potential songs. On 18 December 2002, the broadcaster announced that they had selected the group Urban Trad to represent Belgium in Riga, performing the song "Sanomi" at the contest. The song was written by member of the group, Yves Barbieux, and was performed in imaginary language. "Sanomi" was also the first ever entry at the Eurovision Song Contest that was in imaginary language. On 31 March 2003, RTBF held a press conference in Brussels where the song was presented to the public. The music video for the song, filmed in late March 2003, was released on the same day of the presentation.

=== Controversy ===
Following the announcement of the Belgian entrant, it was revealed by the Belgian State Security Service that one of the members of Urban Trad, Soetkin Collier, had been linked to extreme right wing political groups and has had two criminal records relating to participations in prohibited protests. It was alleged that Collier had also attended a commemorative event in honour of the Nazi leader Rudolf Hess in Antwerp in 1996. Following pressure from local politicians, RTBF announced on 19 February 2003 that Collier would not perform with the group at Eurovision. In July 2003, a report from Comité I, which monitors the Belgian State Security Service, was published that revealed that the time of the initial investigation into Soetkin Collier she had already been deemed as 'no longer a danger to democracy' for at least five years prior.

== At Eurovision ==
According to Eurovision rules, all nations with the exceptions of the bottom five countries in the 2002 contest competed in the final on 24 May 2003. On 29 November 2002, a special allocation draw was held which determined the running order and Belgium was set to perform in position 22, following the entry from Latvia and before the entry from Estonia. Belgium finished in second place with 165 points.

The contest was broadcast in Belgium by both the Flemish and Walloon broadcasters. VRT broadcast the show on TV1 with commentary in Dutch by André Vermeulen and Anja Daems. RTBF televised the shows on La Une with commentary in French by Jean-Pierre Hautier. The show was also broadcast by RTBF on La Première with commentary in French by Patrick Duhamel and Sophie Brems, and by VRT on Radio 2 with commentary in Dutch by Julien Put and Michel Follet.

=== Voting ===
Below is a breakdown of points awarded to Belgium and awarded by Belgium in the contest. The nation awarded its 12 points to Turkey in the contest. RTBF appointed Corinne Boulangier as its spokesperson, to announced the Belgian votes during the show.

Points awarded to Belgium
Score	Country
12 points	France; Poland; Spain
10 points	Bosnia and Herzegovina; Ireland; Latvia; Netherlands; Ukraine
8 points	Estonia; Greece; Israel; Romania
7 points	Iceland; Turkey
6 points	Germany; Portugal
5 points	United Kingdom
4 points	Austria
3 points	Cyprus; Norway; Russia; Slovenia
2 points	
1 point	

Points awarded by Belgium
Score	Country
12 points	Turkey
10 points	Spain
8 points	Netherlands
7 points	Russia
6 points	Norway
5 points	Poland
4 points	Sweden
3 points	Iceland
2 points	Austria
1 point	Ireland
