= Latvia in the Eurovision Song Contest 2003 =

- Eurovision Song Contest 2003
- Participating broadcaster: Latvian Television (LTV)
- Country: Latvia
- Selection process: Eirodziesma 2003
- Selection date: 1 February 2003

Competing entry
- Song: "Hello from Mars"
- Artist: F.L.Y.
- Songwriters: Mārtiņš Freimanis; Lauris Reiniks

Placement
- Final result: 24th, 5 points

Participation chronology

Latvia was represented at the Eurovision Song Contest 2003 with the song "Hello from Mars", written by Mārtiņš Freimanis and Lauris Reiniks, and performed by the group F.L.Y. The Latvian participating broadcaster, Latvian Television (LTV) organised the national final Eirodziesma 2003 in order to select its entry for the contest. In addition, LTV was also the host broadcaster and staged the event at the Skonto Hall in Riga, after winning the previous edition with the song "I Wanna" performed by Marie N.

Fifteen songs were selected to compete in the national final on 1 February 2003 where two rounds of public televoting selected "Hello from Mars" performed by F.L.Y. as the winner. As the host country, Latvia qualified to compete directly in the final of the Eurovision Song Contest. Performing in position 21, it placed twenty-fourth out of the 26 participating countries with 5 points.

== Background ==
Prior to the 2003 contest, Latvian Television (LTV) had participated in the Eurovision Song Contest representing Latvia three times since its first entry in 2000. It won the contest once in 2002 with the song "I Wanna" performed by Marie N. As part of its duties as participating broadcaster, LTV organises the selection of its entry in the Eurovision Song Contest and broadcasts the event in the country. Since its debut in 2000, the broadcaster had organised the selection show Eirodziesma, a selection procedure that was continued in order to select its entry for the 2003 contest.

== Before Eurovision ==
=== Eirodziesma 2003 ===
Eirodziesma 2003 was the fourth edition of Eirodziesma, the music competition organised by LTV to selects its entries for the Eurovision Song Contest. The competition took place at the Olympic Center in Ventspils on 1 February 2003, hosted by Ilze Jaunalksne and Ģirts Līcis with Samija Šerifa hosting from the green room. The show was broadcast on LTV1, via radio on Latvijas Radio 1 as well as online via the broadcaster's official Eurovision Song Contest website eirovizija.lv. The national final was watched by 525,000 viewers in Latvia with a market share of 50%.

==== Competing entries ====
Artists and songwriters were able to submit their entries to the broadcaster between 3 October 2002 and 4 November 2002. 57 entries were submitted at the conclusion of the submission period; 49 of the songs were in English, six were in Latvian and two were in Russian. An international jury panel appointed by LTV evaluated the submitted songs and selected fifteen entries for the competition. The twenty competing artists and songs were announced during a press conference on 15 November 2002.

Artist	Song	Songwriter(s)
4.elements	"Long Way to Run"	Arnis Mednis
Andris Ābelīte	"I Need Love"	Andris Ābelīte
C-Stones	"When the Rain Will Go"	Mārtiņš Freimanis
Caffe	"I Am Yours"	Intars Busulis, Andis Grīva, Juris Merkulovs, Raimonds Tiguls, Mareks Lindbergs
Elīna Fūrmane	"Right Way"	Elīna Fūrmane, Edgars Dambis
Finally Switched On	"Another Way"	Dāvis Kolbergs, Mārcis Auziņš, Jānis Rubens, Nils Podnieks
F.L.Y.	"Hello from Mars"	Mārtiņš Freimanis, Lauris Reiniks
Fomins and Kleins	"Muzikants"	Tomass Kleins, Guntars Račs
Ieva Kerēvica and Normunds Rutulis	"Lead Me to Your Heart"	Madara Celma
Jānis Stībelis	"Maybe"	Jānis Stībelis
Julian	"U Can't Stop Me"	Jānis Zvirgzdiņš
Kristīne Broka	"License for Love"	Daiga Rūtenberga, Kristīne Broka
Madara Celma	"Away from You"	Madara Celma
Nicol	"One More Dance"	Viktorija Zeļinska
Tatjana Timčuka	"Roses and Tears"	Sergejs Kugeļevs

==== Final ====
The final took place on 1 February 2003. Fifteen acts competed and the winner was selected over two rounds of public televoting. In the first round, the top five songs advanced to the second round, the superfinal. In the superfinal, the voting results were revealed by Latvia's five regions alongside votes submitted via mobile phones and SMS, and the song with the highest number of votes, "Hello from Mars" performed by F.L.Y., was declared the winner. In addition to the performances of the competing entries, guest performers included Marie N,winner of Eurovision 2002; Lior Narkis, who would represent Israel in Eurovision 2003; and Oleksandr Ponomariov, who would represent Ukraine in Eurovision 2003.

Final – 1 February 2003
R/O	Artist	Song	Votes	Place
1	Ieva Kerēvica and Normunds Rutulis	"Lead Me to Your Heart"	1,562	13
2	F.L.Y.	"Hello from Mars"	43,922	1
3	Nicol	"One More Dance"	6,770	6
4	Tatjana Timčuka	"Roses and Tears"	10,235	4
5	4.elements	"Long Way to Run"	2,361	10
6	Finally Switched On	"Another Way"	1,116	15
7	Caffe	"I Am Yours"	1,628	12
8	C-Stones	"When the Rain Will Go"	5,106	7
9	Kristīne Broka	"License for Love"	1,533	14
10	Andris Ābelīte	"I Need Love"	9,309	5
11	Jānis Stībelis	"Maybe"	4,165	8
12	Madara Celma	"Away from You"	10,795	3
13	Elīna Fūrmane	"Right Way"	3,986	9
14	Fomins and Kleins	"Muzikants"	22,248	2
15	Julian	"U Can't Stop Me"	1,650	11

Superfinal – 1 February 2003
R/O	Artist	Song	Televoting Regions					Mobiles and SMS	Total	Place
R/O	Artist	Song	Kurzeme	Zemgale	Vidzeme	Latgale	Riga	Mobiles and SMS	Total	Place
1	F.L.Y.	"Hello from Mars"	3,755	3,838	3,542	1,571	11,120	41,024	64,850	1
2	Tatjana Timčuka	"Roses and Tears"	915	873	910	663	1,968	8,850	14,179	4
3	Andris Ābelīte	"I Need Love"	400	568	457	123	2,650	7,911	12,109	5
4	Madara Celma	"Away from You"	506	819	675	246	3,530	10,399	16,175	3
5	Fomins and Kleins	"Muzikants"	2,818	2,017	1,731	590	5,958	30,190	43,304	2

== At Eurovision ==
According to Eurovision rules, all nations with the exceptions of the bottom ten countries in the 2002 contest competed in the final. As the host country, Latvia automatically qualified to compete in the final on 24 May 2003. On 29 November 2002, a special allocation draw was held which determined the running order and Latvia was set to perform in position 21, following the entry from Poland and before the entry from Belgium. Latvia finished in twenty-fourth place with 5 points. The show was broadcast in Latvia on LTV1 featuring commentary by Kārlis Streips.

=== Voting ===
Below is a breakdown of points awarded to Latvia and awarded by Latvia in the contest. The nation awarded its 12 points to Russia in the contest. LTV appointed Ģirts Līcis as its spokesperson to announce the Latvian votes during the final.

Points awarded to Latvia
Score	Country
12 points	
10 points	
8 points	
7 points	
6 points	
5 points	Estonia
4 points	
3 points	
2 points	
1 point	

Points awarded by Latvia
Score	Country
12 points	Russia
10 points	Belgium
8 points	Poland
7 points	Norway
6 points	Sweden
5 points	Ukraine
4 points	Austria
3 points	Iceland
2 points	Germany
1 point	Ireland
