= Netherlands in the Eurovision Song Contest 2003 =

- Eurovision Song Contest 2003
- Participating broadcaster: Nederlandse Omroep Stichting (NOS)
- Country: Netherlands
- Selection process: Nationaal Songfestival 2003
- Selection date: 1 March 2003

Competing entry
- Song: "One More Night"
- Artist: Esther Hart
- Songwriters: Tjeerd van Zanen; Alan Michael

Placement
- Final result: 13th, 45 points

Participation chronology

The Netherlands was represented in the Eurovision Song Contest 2003 with the song "One More Night", written by Tjeerd van Zanen and Alan Michael, performed by Esther Hart. The Dutch participating broadcaster, Nederlandse Omroep Stichting (NOS), selected its entry through Nationaal Songfestival 2003. The Netherlands was returning to the contest after a one-year absence in 2002 following relegation as one of the bottom six entrants from 2001. 32 entries appeared in the national competition, which consisted of four semi-finals and a final. Eight entries proceeded to the final on 1 March 2003 where "One More Night", performed by Esther Hart, was selected as Eurovision entry, following a combination of votes from jury-panel and public voting.

The Eurovision Song Contest took place on 24 May 2003. Performing during the show in position 14, the Netherlands placed thirteenth out of 26 participating countries, scoring 45 points.

== Background ==
Prior to the 2003 contest, Nederlandse Televisie Stichting (NTS) until 1969, and Nederlandse Omroep Stichting (NOS) since 1970, had participated in the Eurovision Song Contest representing the Netherlands forty-three times since the inaugural contest in 1956. They have won the contest four times: in 1957 with the song "Net als toen" performed by Corry Brokken; in 1959 with the song "'n Beetje" performed by Teddy Scholten; in 1969 as one of four countries to tie for first place with "De troubadour" performed by Lenny Kuhr; and in 1975 with "Ding-a-dong" performed by the group Teach-In. The Dutch least successful result is last place, achieved on four occasions, most recently in the 1968 contest. They have received nul points on two occasions; in 1962 and 1963.

As part of its duties as participating broadcaster, NOS organises the selection of its entry in the Eurovision Song Contest and broadcasts the event in the country. The Dutch broadcasters had used various methods to select the Dutch entry in the past, such as the Nationaal Songfestival, a live televised national final to choose the performer, song or both to compete at Eurovision. However, internal selections have also been held on occasion. Between 1998 and 2001, NOS has organised Nationaal Songfestival in order to select both the artist and song for the contest. The method was continued for its 2003 entry, with the national final being organised in collaboration with Televisie Radio Omroep Stichting (TROS).

== Before Eurovision ==
=== Nationaal Songfestival 2003 ===
Nationaal Songfestival 2003 was the national final developed by NOS, in collaboration with TROS, to select its entry for the Eurovision Song Contest 2003. Thirty-two entries competed in the competition consisting of five shows that commenced with the first of four semi-finals on 1 February 2003 and concluded with a final on 1 March 2003. All shows in the competition were broadcast on Nederland 2.

==== Format ====
The format of the national final consisted of five shows: four semi-finals and a final. The semi-finals each featured eight competing entries from which two advanced from each show to complete the eight-song lineup in the finals. The results for the semi-final shows were determined by a seven-member expert jury and votes from the public. The jury selected one qualifier, while a public televote determined an additional qualifier from the remaining entries. In the final, the winner was selected by the combination of votes from public televoting and a seven-member expert jury. Viewers were able to vote via telephone and SMS.

The jury panel that voted in all shows consisted of:

- Cornald Maas – journalist
- Corry Brokken – singer and television presenter, who won Eurovision for the Netherlands in 1957 as well as represented the Netherlands in 1956 and in 1958
- Seth Kamphuijs – actor and presenter
- Coot van Doesburg – lyricist and television critic
- Johan Nijenhuis – director and producer
- Nance Coolen – singer and television presenter
- Stanley Burleson – actor, choreographer, director and singer

==== Competing entries ====
The Dutch broadcaster together with Conamus directly invited over 1,000 composers to submit entries. 502 submissions were received by the broadcaster at the closing of the deadline, and the thirty-two selected competing entries were announced during a press conference on 16 January 2003. The selection of the entries for the competition occurred through the decision by a selection commission consisting of Willem van Beusekom, Jerney Kaagman, Ron Stoeltie, Daniël Dekker and Daan van Rijsbergen following a live audition of 60 shortlisted entries. Among the artists was Ingrid Simons (as part of Ebonique) who represented Belgium in 2002 as part of Sergio and the Ladies.

Artist	Song	Songwriter(s)
A-Teaze	"Don't Cry"	Aleksandar Masevski
Aletia Bourne	"Wanna Be the One"	Martin Condon, Gareth Owen
Arwin Kluft	"Turiddu"	Jeroen Englebert, Giancarlo Romita
Astrit	"Together Forever"	Dick Berg, Hubert-Jan Horrocks, Hanna Riemens
Barbara Lok	"Als twee vrienden"	Carmen Sars
The Beanuts	"Give It Up!"	Ed van Otterdijk, Angeline van Otterdijk
Bert Heerink and Manou	"Blue Skies Are for Free"	Ad van Olm, Eric Dikeb
Blauwdruk	"Hotel t'hart"	Allan Eshuys, Barry Menger
Boulevard	"Souvenirs"	Edwin Schimscheimer, Bruce R.F. Smith
Brothers	"Stand as One"	Peter de Wijn
De Helden	"Omdat jij jij bent"	Michiel Ooms
Ebonique	"Heatwave"	Philip Vella, Gerard James Borg
Esther Hart	"One More Night"	Tjeerd van Zanen, Alan Michael
Georges Lotze	"Footprints in the Sand"	Peter de Wijn
Gordon	"I'll Be Your Voice"	Mark Dakriet, Giorgio Tuinfort, Sandra St. Victor
Jeffrey	"Waar en wanneer"	Edwin Schimscheimer, Spiros Chalos, Belinda Anholt
Jerique Allan	"All About Love"	Jerry Krolis, Sven Jansen, Robbert van Ark
Julia West	"Talking Angels"	Luca Genta, Ralph van Manen, Julia West, Phil Thompson
Kathy Bloom	"I'm On Fire"	Dries Brouwer, Gert Polkerman, Edith Sintemaartensdijk
Lewis and Simon	"Let's Give It a Try"	Jan Willem Verbeek, Paula Patricio
Mango Nuts	"Time to Party"	Robbert van Ark, Sven Jansen
Martin Frankena	"Zoeken in de lucht"	Han Kooreneef, Syb van der Ploeg, Nico Outhuijse
Mary Amora	"Somewhere by the River"	Ernst van der Kerkhof
Mazzel	"Nananana"	Rogier van der Ven, Ranco Mes
Sandra Abbink	"Beautiful Life"	Marcel de Groot, Jaap Schilder
Sasja Brouwers	"Rauw"	Jeroen Englebert, Pim Koopman
Sofuja and Glenn Corneille	"She Would"	Glenn Corneille, Chantal Nijssen
The Soullistics	"We Can't Stop the Music"	Johnny Sap, Joost Dirksen, Humphrey de Groot
Steffen de Wolff	"Jij laat me nooit meer los"	Patrick Drabe, Steffen de Wolff
Sonny's Inc.	"Mamboleo"	Huig Ouwehand, Roland Gaedtgens, Sonny Hoogwerf
Suzanne	"Over the Moon"	Luca Genta, John O'Hare
Zooom	"Boogie"	Peter de Wijn

==== Semi-finals ====
The four semi-finals took place on 1, 8, 15 and 22 February 2003 at the Hart van Holland in Nijkerk, hosted by Harm Edens. In each semi-final eight acts competed and two entries qualified to the final. A seven-member expert jury first selected one entry to advance, while an additional qualifier was selected by a public televote. Michelle (who represented the Netherlands in 2001) replaced Coot van Doesburg as a juror in the third semi-final, while Marlayne (who represented the Netherlands in 1999) replaced Johan Nijenhuis as a juror in the fourth semi-final.

Jury qualifier Public vote qualifier

Semi-final 1 – 1 February 2003
R/O	Artist	Song	Jury		Televote		Result
R/O	Artist	Song	Votes	Rank	Percentage	Rank	Result
1	Sunny's Inc.	"Mamboleo"	10	7	7%	6	—N/a
2	Aletia Bourne	"Wanna Be the One"	49	2	4%	8	—N/a
3	Martin Frankena	"Zoeken in de lucht"	45	3	8%	4	—N/a
4	Astrit	"Together Forever"	38	4	9%	3	—N/a
5	Jerique Allan	"All About Love"	35	6	8%	4	—N/a
6	Mary Amora	"Somewhere by the River"	61	1	41%	1	Qualified
7	Blauwdruk	"Hotel 't Hart"	5	8	6%	7	—N/a
8	Zooom	"Boogie"	37	5	17%	2	Qualified

Detailed Jury Votes
R/O	Song	C. Maas	C. Brokken	S. Kamphuijs	C. van Doesburg	J. Nijenhuis	N. Coolen	S. Burleson	Total
1	"Mamboleo"	2	1	1	1	1	2	2	10
2	"Wanna Be the One"	7	7	12	10	5	7	1	49
3	"Zoeken in de lucht"	3	12	7	7	12	1	3	45
4	"Together Forever"	5	5	5	5	3	10	5	38
5	"All About Love"	10	3	3	2	2	5	10	35
6	"Somewhere by the River"	12	10	2	12	10	3	12	61
7	"Hotel 't Hart"		2		3				5
8	"Boogie"	1		10		7	12	7	37

Semi-final 2 – 8 February 2003
R/O	Artist	Song	Jury		Televote		Result
R/O	Artist	Song	Votes	Rank	Percentage	Rank	Result
1	The Beanuts	"Give It Up!"	26	4	7%	6	—N/a
2	Barbara Lok	"Als twee vrienden"	18	6	10%	5	—N/a
3	Esther Hart	"One More Night"	73	1	30%	1	Qualified
4	Sofuja and Glenn Corneille	"She Would"	63	2	15%	3	—N/a
5	Steffen de Wolff	"Jij laat me nooit meer los"	9	8	3%	8	—N/a
6	Mango Nuts	"Time to Party"	53	3	18%	2	Qualified
7	Suzanne	"Over the Moon"	21	5	11%	4	—N/a
8	Georges Lotze	"Footprints in the Sand"	17	7	6%	7	—N/a

Detailed Jury Votes
R/O	Song	C. Maas	C. Brokken	S. Kamphuijs	C. van Doesburg	J. Nijenhuis	N. Coolen	S. Burleson	Total
1	"Give It Up!"	3	3	7	2	3	5	3	50
2	"Als twee vrienden"	1	10	3	1	1	1	1	18
3	"One More Night"	12	5	12	12	12	10	10	73
4	"She Would"	10	7	10	5	7	12	12	63
5	"Jij laat me nooit meer los"			2	3		2	2	9
6	"Time to Party"	7	12		10	10	7	7	53
7	"Over the Moon"	5	1	5		2	3	5	21
8	"Footprints in the Sand"	2	2	1	7	5			17

Semi-final 3 – 15 February 2003
R/O	Artist	Song	Jury		Televote		Result
R/O	Artist	Song	Votes	Rank	Percentage	Rank	Result
1	The Soullistics	"We Can't Stop the Music"	21	5	9%	5	—N/a
2	Julia West	"Talking Angels"	49	3	6%	6	—N/a
3	Mazzel	"Nananana"	12	6	19%	2	—N/a
4	Brothers	"Stand as One"	10	7	3%	8	—N/a
5	Sandra Abbink	"Beautiful Life"	61	2	18%	3	—N/a
6	Jeffrey	"Waar en wanneer"	5	8	4%	7	—N/a
7	Arwin Kluft	"Turiddu"	47	4	24%	1	Qualified
8	Ebonique	"Heatwave"	75	1	17%	4	Qualified

Detailed Jury Votes
R/O	Song	C. Maas	C. Brokken	S. Kamphuijs	Michelle	J. Nijenhuis	N. Coolen	S. Burleson	Total
1	"We Can't Stop the Music"	3	5	1	5	2	3	2	21
2	"Talking Angels"	7	3	7	10	5	10	7	49
3	"Nananana"	1	1	3	2	3	1	1	12
4	"Stand as One"	2	2			1		5	10
5	"Beautiful Life"	12	7	10	3	12	7	10	61
6	"Waar en wanneer"			2	1		2		5
7	"Turiddu"	5	12	5	7	10	5	3	47
8	"Heatwave"	10	10	12	12	7	12	12	75

Semi-final 4 – 22 February 2003
R/O	Artist	Song	Jury		Televote		Result
R/O	Artist	Song	Votes	Rank	Percentage	Rank	Result
1	Kathy Bloom	"I'm On Fire"	46	3	4%	7	—N/a
2	Boulevard	"Souvenirs"	20	6	6%	4	—N/a
3	Lewis and Simon	"Let's Give It a Try"	58	2	5%	6	—N/a
4	Sasja Brouwers	"Rauw"	4	8	6%	4	—N/a
5	Gordon	"I'll Be Your Voice"	82	1	36%	1	Qualified
6	Bert Heerink and Manou	"Blue Skies Are for Free"	11	7	23%	2	Qualified
7	De Helden	"Omdat jij jij bent"	23	5	4%	7	—N/a
8	A-Teaze	"Don't Cry"	36	4	16%	3	—N/a

Detailed Jury Votes
R/O	Song	C. Maas	C. Brokken	S. Kamphuijs	C. van Doesburg	Marlayne	N. Coolen	S. Burleson	Total
1	"I'm On Fire"	7	10	7	10	2	3	7	46
2	"Souvenirs"		3	3	5	3	1	5	20
3	"Let's Give It a Try"	10	7	10	7	7	7	10	58
4	"Rauw"	1			3				4
5	"I'll Be Your Voice"	12	12	12	12	12	10	12	82
6	"Blue Skies Are for Free"	2	2	2	1	1	2	1	11
7	"Omdat jij jij bent"	3	1	1		10	5	3	23
8	"Don't Cry"	5	5	5	2	5	12	2	36

==== Final ====
The final took place on 1 March 2003 at the Rotterdam Ahoy in Rotterdam, hosted by Loes Luca where the eight entries that qualified from the preceding four semi-finals competed. The winner, "One More Night" performed by Esther Hart, was selected by the 50/50 combination of a public televote and the votes of a seven-member expert jury. Edsilia Rombley, who represented the Netherlands in 1998, replaced Nance Coolen as a juror in the final. The viewers and the juries each had a total of 280 points to award. Each juror distributed their points as follows: 1, 2, 3, 5, 7, 10 and 12 points. The viewer vote was based on the percentage of votes each song achieved through the following voting methods: telephone and SMS voting. For example, if a song gained 10% of the vote, then that entry would be awarded 10% of 280 points rounded to the nearest integer: 28 points. 55,000 votes were cast by the public during the final. In addition to the performances of the competing entries, the show featured performances by Loes Luca as Nénette together with Les Zézettes and the Metropole Orchestra.

On the day after the contest, a technical problem came to light whereby the 30,000 SMS votes could not be counted on time. A revision of the results revealed that Bert Heerink and Manou would have placed fifth, with Mango Nuts and Mary Amora correspondingly dropping a place.

Final – 1 March 2003
R/O	Artist	Song	Jury	Televote	Total	Place
1	Mango Nuts	"Time to Party"	22	9	31	5
2	Mary Amora	"Somewhere by the River"	20	8	28	6
3	Bert Heerink and Manou	"Blue Skies Are for Free"	4	21	25	7
4	Gordon	"I'll Be Your Voice"	68	56	124	2
5	Esther Hart	"One More Night"	78	92	170	1
6	Ebonique	"Heatwave"	40	27	67	4
7	Arwin Kluft	"Turiddu"	38	64	102	3
8	Zooom	"Boogie"	10	3	13	8

Detailed Jury Votes
R/O	Song	C. Maas	C. Brokken	S. Kamphuis	C. van Doesburg	J. Nijenhuis	E. Rombley	S. Burleson	Total
1	"Time to Party"	2	2	1	5	7	2	3	22
2	"Somewhere by the River"	3	3		3	3	3	5	20
3	"Blue Skies Are for Free"	1		2			1		4
4	"I'll Be Your Voice"	7	7	12	10	10	10	12	68
5	"One More Night"	12	10	10	12	12	12	10	78
6	"Heatwave"	5	5	7	7	2	7	7	40
7	"Turiddu"	10	12	3	1	5	5	2	38
8	"Boogie"		1	5	2	1		1	10

==== Ratings ====
Viewing figures by show
Show	Date	Viewers	Ref.
Final	1 March 2003	1,300,000	

== At Eurovision ==
According to Eurovision rules, all nations with the exceptions of the bottom five countries in the 2002 contest competed in the final on 24 May 2003. On 29 November 2002, a special allocation draw was held which determined the running order and the Netherlands was set to perform in position 14, following the entry from Israel and before the entry from the United Kingdom. The Netherlands finished in thirteenth place with 45 points.

The show was broadcast in the Netherlands on Nederland 1 with commentary by Willem van Beusekom as well as via radio on Radio 3FM with commentary by Wessel van Diepen.

=== Voting ===
Below is a breakdown of points awarded to the Netherlands and awarded by the Netherlands in the contest. The nation awarded its 12 points to Turkey in the contest. NOS appointed Marlayne, who represented the Netherlands in 1999, as its spokesperson to announce the Dutch votes during the show.

Points awarded to the Netherlands
Score	Country
12 points	
10 points	Russia
8 points	Belgium
7 points	Malta
6 points	
5 points	Ireland; Norway; Sweden
4 points	
3 points	
2 points	Bosnia and Herzegovina; Israel
1 point	United Kingdom

Points awarded by the Netherlands
Score	Country
12 points	Turkey
10 points	Belgium
8 points	Austria
7 points	Norway
6 points	Iceland
5 points	Spain
4 points	Poland
3 points	Sweden
2 points	Germany
1 point	Russia
