= Estonia in the Eurovision Song Contest 2003 =

- Eurovision Song Contest 2003
- Participating broadcaster: Eesti Televisioon (ETV)
- Country: Estonia
- Selection process: Eurolaul 2003
- Selection date: 8 February 2003

Competing entry
- Song: "Eighties Coming Back"
- Artist: Ruffus
- Songwriter: Vaiko Eplik

Placement
- Final result: 21st, 14 points

Participation chronology

Estonia was represented at the Eurovision Song Contest 2003 with the song "Eighties Coming Back", written by Vaiko Eplik, and performed by the band Ruffus. The Estonian participating broadcaster, Eesti Televisioon (ETV), organised the national final Eurolaul 2003 in order to select its entry for the contest. Ten songs competed in the national final and "Eighties Coming Back" performed by Claire's Birthday was selected as the winner by an international jury panel. The band was later renamed as Ruffus for Eurovision.

Estonia competed in the Eurovision Song Contest which took place on 24 May 2003. Performing during the show in position 17, Estonia placed twenty-first out of the 26 participating countries, scoring 14 points.

== Background ==
Prior to the 2003 contest, Eesti Televisioon (ETV) had participated in the Eurovision Song Contest representing Estonia eight times since its first entry in 1994, winning the contest on one occasion: in 2001 with the song "Everybody" performed by Tanel Padar, Dave Benton and 2XL.

As part of its duties as participating broadcaster, ETV organises the selection of its entry in the Eurovision Song Contest and broadcasts the event in the country. Since their debut, the broadcaster has organised national finals that feature a competition among multiple artists and songs in order to select its entry for the contest. ETV has organised the Eurolaul competition since 1996 in order to select its entry and on 8 November 2002, it announced the organisation of Eurolaul 2003 in order to select its 2003 entry.

== Before Eurovision ==
=== Eurolaul 2003 ===
Eurolaul 2003 was the tenth edition of the national selection Eurolaul, organised by ETV to select its entry for the Eurovision Song Contest 2003. The competition consisted of a ten-song final on 8 February 2003 at the ETV studios in Tallinn, hosted by Marko Reikop and Romi Erlach and broadcast on ETV as well as streamed online at the official Eurolaul website eurolaul.ee. The show was also broadcast in Latvia on LTV1. The national final was watched by 343,500 viewers in Estonia with a market share of 57.4%.

==== Competing entries ====
On 8 November 2002, ETV opened the submission period for artists and composers to submit their entries up until 9 December 2002. A record 100 submissions were received by the deadline—breaking the previous record of 90, set during the 2002 edition. A 10-member jury panel selected 10 finalists from the submissions and the selected songs were announced on 13 December 2002. Among the competing artists was previous Eurovision Song Contest entrant Koit Toome, who represented Estonia in 1998. Kaire Vilgats (member of Family), Kadi Toom, Maarja Kivi (member of Vanilla Ninja), Maiken and Nightlight Duo have all competed in previous editions of Eurolaul. The selection jury consisted of Jaak Joala (musician), Meelis Kapstas (journalist), Ivo Linna (singer), Jaan Karp (musician), Priit Hõbemägi (culture critic), Tõnu Kõrvits (composer), Eda-Ines Etti (singer), Ignar Fjuk (member of the National Broadcasting Council), Karmel Eikner (journalist) and Tiit Kikas (musician).

Artist	Song	Songwriter(s)
Claire's Birthday	"Eighties Coming Back"	Vaiko Eplik
Family	"Don't Ever Change"	Susan Lilleväli, Johannes Lõhmus, Kaire Vilgats
Kadi Toom	"Have a Little Faith"	Maian Kärmas, Priit Pajusaar, Glen Pilvre
Kadi Toom	"We Are Not Done"	Maian Kärmas, Priit Pajusaar, Glen Pilvre
Koit Toome	"Know What I Feel"	Koit Toome, Kersti Kuusk, Imre Sooäär
Maiken	"No Matter What It Takes"	Peter Ross, Elmar Liitmaa
Nightlight Duo	"I Can B the 1"	Sven Lõhmus
Slobodan River	"What a Day"	Maria Rahula, Tomi Rahula
Vanilla Ninja	"Club Kung-Fu"	Piret Järvis, Sven Lõhmus
Viies Element	"Have It Your Way"	Asko-Rome Altsoo, Raul Veeber, Aimar Toomla

==== Final ====
The final took place on 8 February 2003. Ten songs competed during the show and a jury selected "Eighties Coming Back" performed by Claire's Birthday as the winner. A non-competitive public vote conducted via televoting and online voting registered 77,729 votes and selected "Club Kung-Fu" performed by Vanilla Ninja as the winner. The jury panel that voted in the final consisted of Anders Berglund (Swedish conductor), Sergio (Belgian singer), Darja Švajger (Slovenian singer), Manfred Witt (German television producer), Moshe Datz (Israeli singer), Renārs Kaupers (Latvian musician), Michael Ball (British singer) and Björgvin Halldórsson (Icelandic singer).

Final – 8 February 2003
R/O	Artist	Song	Jury Votes								Total	Place
R/O	Artist	Song	A. Berglund	Sergio	D. Švajger	M. Witt	M. Datz	R. Kaupers	M. Ball	B. Halldórsson	Total	Place
1	Kadi Toom	"We Are Not Done"	12	6	3	8	6	10	8	5	58	3
2	Family	"Don't Ever Change"	6	8	7	5	1	3	2	1	33	8
3	Nightlight Duo	"I Can B the 1"	10	10	5	12	3	1	4	7	52	4
4	Kadi Toom	"Have a Little Faith"	5	3	6	10	7	6	5	6	48	5
5	Koit Toome	"Know What I Feel"	8	2	12	3	12	5	12	10	64	2
6	Slobodan River	"What a Day"	2	4	1	2	2	8	10	4	33	7
7	Maiken	"No Matter What It Takes"	7	12	8	4	4	7	3	2	47	6
8	Vanilla Ninja	"Club Kung-Fu"	1	7	2	1	5	2	6	8	32	9
9	Claire's Birthday	"Eighties Coming Back"	4	5	10	7	8	12	7	12	65	1
10	Viies Element	"Have It Your Way"	3	1	4	6	10	4	1	3	32	9

== At Eurovision ==
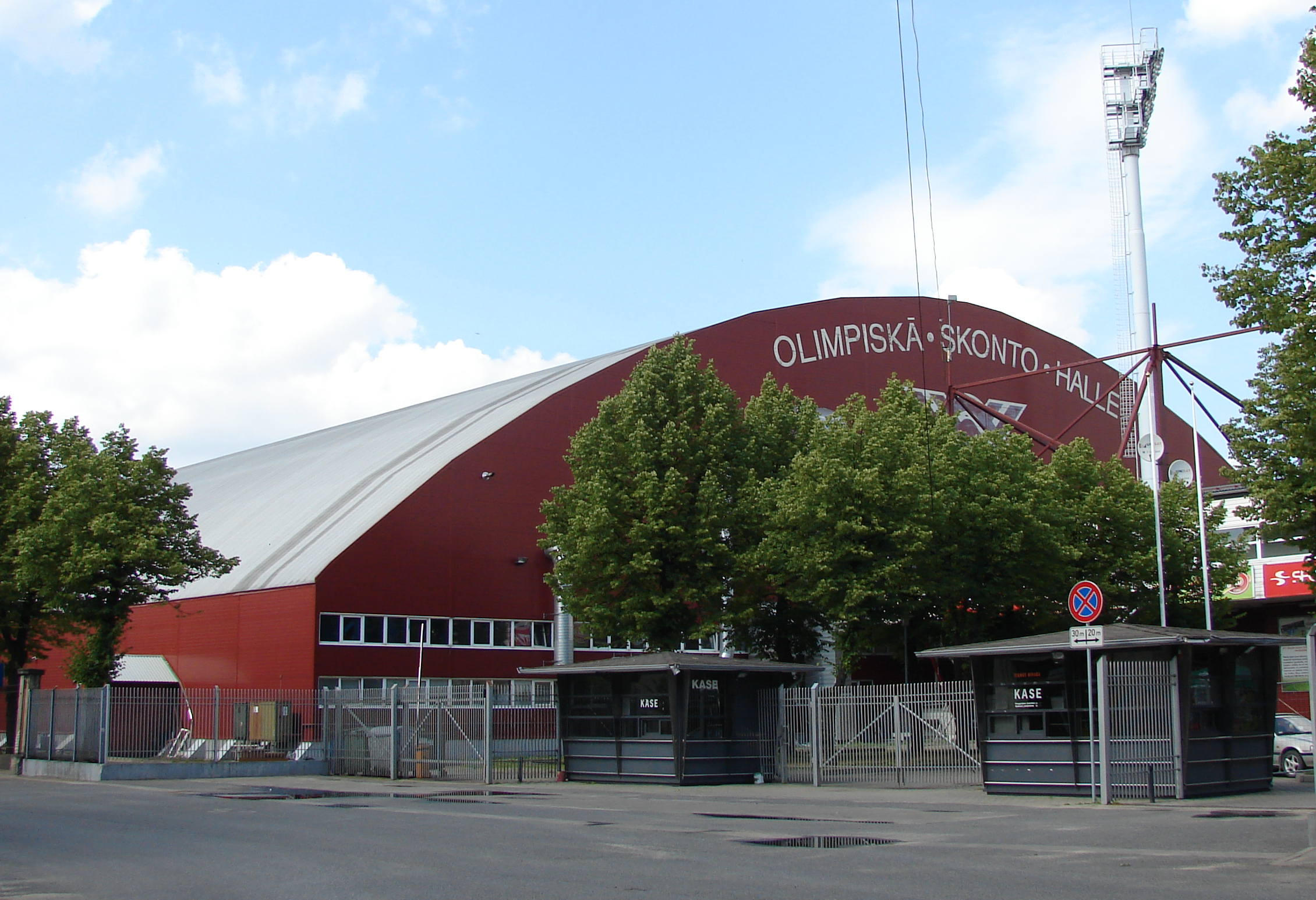
The Eurovision Song Contest 2003 took place at Skonto Hall in Riga, Latvia.

The Eurovision Song Contest 2003 took place at the Skonto Hall in Riga, Latvia, on 24 May 2003. According to the Eurovision rules, the participant list for the contest was composed of the winning country from the previous year's contest, any countries which had not participated in the previous year's contest, and those which had obtained the highest placing in the previous contest, up to the maximum 26 participants in total. The draw for running order had previously been held on 29 November 2002 in Riga, with the results being revealed during a delayed broadcast of the proceedings later that day. Estonia was set to perform in position 23, following the entry from Belgium and before the entry from Romania. Claire's Birthday performed at the contest under the new name Ruffus and Estonia finished in twenty-first place with 14 points.

The show was broadcast in Estonia on ETV with commentary by Marko Reikop as well as via radio on Raadio 2 with commentary by Vello Rand.

=== Voting ===
Televoting was an obligatory voting method for all participating countries. Point values of 1–8, 10 and 12 were awarded to the 10 most popular songs of the televote, in ascending order. Countries voted in the same order as they had performed. Below is a breakdown of points awarded to Estonia and awarded by Estonia in the contest. The nation awarded its 12 points to Russia in the contest. ETV appointed Ines, who represented Estonia in 2000, as its spokesperson to announce the results of the Estonian televote during the show.

Points awarded to Estonia
Score	Country
12 points	
10 points	
8 points	Ireland
7 points	
6 points	
5 points	
4 points	
3 points	United Kingdom
2 points	Russia
1 point	Iceland

Points awarded by Estonia
Score	Country
12 points	Russia
10 points	Norway
8 points	Belgium
7 points	Sweden
6 points	Austria
5 points	Latvia
4 points	Poland
3 points	Ukraine
2 points	Germany
1 point	Iceland
