= Iceland in the Eurovision Song Contest 2003 =

- Eurovision Song Contest 2003
- Participating broadcaster: Ríkisútvarpið (RÚV)
- Country: Iceland
- Selection process: Söngvakeppni Sjónvarpsins 2003
- Selection date: 15 February 2003

Competing entry
- Song: "Open Your Heart"
- Artist: Birgitta
- Songwriters: Hallgrímur Óskarsson; Sveinbjörn I. Baldvinsson; Birgitta Haukdal

Placement
- Final result: 8th, 81 points

Participation chronology

Iceland was represented at the Eurovision Song Contest 2003 with the song "Open Your Heart", composed by Hallgrímur Óskarsson, with lyrics by Sveinbjörn I. Baldvinsson and Birgitta Haukdal, and performed by Birgitta herself. The Icelandic participating broadcaster, Ríkisútvarpið (RÚV), selected its entry through Söngvakeppni Sjónvarpsins 2003. The broadcaster returned to the contest after a one-year absence following their relegation in 2002 as one of the bottom six entrants in 2001. Fifteen songs competed in the national selection which was held on 15 February 2003. "Segðu mér allt" performed by Birgitta Haukdal emerged as the winner exclusively through public televoting. The song was later translated from Icelandic to English for Eurovision and was titled "Open Your Heart".

Iceland competed in the Eurovision Song Contest which took place on 24 May 2003. Performing as the opening entry for the show in position 1, Iceland placed eighth out of the 26 participating countries, scoring 81 points.

== Background ==
Prior to the 2003 Contest, Ríkisútvarpið (RÚV) had participated in the Eurovision Song Contest representing Iceland fifteen times since its first entry in 1986. Its best placing in the contest to this point was second, achieved in 1999 with the song "All Out of Luck" performed by Selma. In 2001, it placed twenty-second (joint last) with the song "Angel" performed by Two Tricky.

As part of its duties as participating broadcaster, RÚV organises the selection of its entry in the Eurovision Song Contest and broadcasts the event in the country. The broadcaster confirmed its intentions to participate at the 2003 contest on 17 October 2002. Since 2000, RÚV has used a national final to select its entry for the contest, a method that continued for its 2003 participation.

== Before Eurovision ==
=== Söngvakeppni Sjónvarpsins 2003 ===
Söngvakeppni Sjónvarpsins 2003 was the national final format developed by RÚV in order to select its entry for the Eurovision Song Contest 2003. The competition was hosted by Logi Bergmann Eiðsson and Gísli Marteinn Baldursson and took place at the Háskólabíó venue in Reykjavík. The show was broadcast on RÚV and via radio on Rás 2.

==== Competing entries ====
On 17 October 2002, RÚV opened the submission period for interested songwriters to submit their entries until the deadline on 18 November 2002. Songwriters were required to be Icelandic, possess Icelandic citizenship or have permanent residency in Iceland, and were required to submit entries in Icelandic with the winning composers being able to later decide the language that will be performed at the Eurovision Song Contest in Riga. At the close of the submission deadline, 204 entries were received. A selection committee was formed in order to select the top fifteen entries. The fifteen competing artists and songs were revealed by the broadcaster on 17 January 2003. RÚV presented the songs between 3 and 7 February 2003 during special programmes broadcast on RÚV and Rás 2.

Artist	Song	Songwriter(s)
Birgitta Haukdal	"Segðu mér allt"	Sveinbjörn I. Baldvinsson, Birgitta Haukdal, Hallgrímur Óskarsson
Botnleðja	"Euróvísa"	Heiðar Örn Kristjánsson, Ragnar Páll Steinsson, Haraldur Freyr Gíslason
Eivør Pálsdóttir	"Í nótt"	Friðrik Erlingsson, Ingvi Þór Kormáksson
Hjördis Elín Lárusdóttir and Gúðrun Árný Karlsdóttir	"Með þer"	Sveinn Rúnar Sigurðsson
Höskuldur Örn Lárusson	"Allt"	Höskuldur Örn Lárusson
Hreimur Örn Heimisson	"Mig drejmdi lítinn draum"	Friðrik Karlsson
Hreimur Örn Heimisson	"Þú"	Ingibjörg Gunnarsdóttir, Grétar Örvarsson
Ingunn Gylfadóttir	"Sögur"	Sigurjón Birgir Sigurðsson, Ingunn Gylfadóttir, Tömas Hermansson
Jóhanna Vigdis Arnardóttir	"Þú og ég (er ég anda)"	Stéfan Hilmarsson, Ingólfur Gúdjónsson
Ragnheiður Eiríksdóttir	"Tangó"	Þorkell S. Símonarson, Ragnheiður Eiriksdóttir
Ragnheiður Gröndal	"Ferrari"	Páll Torfi Önundarson
Regina Ósk Óskarsdóttir and Hjalti Jónsson	"Engu þurfum að tapa"	Einar Örn Jónsson
Rúnar Júlíusson	"Ást á skítugum skóm"	Karl Olgeir Olgeirsson
Þóra Gísladóttir	"Hva sem ég ender"	Bragi Valdimar Sikúlason, Karl Olgeir Olgeirsson
Þórey Heiðdal Vilhjálmsdóttir	"Sá þig"	Albert G. Jónsson, Kristinn Sturluson

==== Final ====
The final took place on 15 February 2003 where fifteen entries competed. The winner, "Segðu mér allt" performed by Birgitta Haukdal, was determined solely by televoting. Over 70,000 votes were received.

Final – 15 February 2003
R/O	Artist	Song	Televote	Place
1	Þóra Gísladóttir	"Hva sem ég ender"	—	—
2	Ragnheiður Gröndal	"Ferrari"	—	—
3	Hreimur Örn Heimisson	"Þú"	—	7
4	Ingunn Gylfadóttir	"Sögur"	—	15
5	Eivør Pálsdóttir	"Í nótt"	—	6
6	Hjördis Elín Lárusdóttir and Gúðrun Árný Karlsdóttir	"Með þer"	—	—
7	Regina Ósk Óskarsdóttir and Hjalti Jónsson	"Engu þurfum að tapa"	—	—
8	Botnleðja	"Euróvísa"	10,594	2
9	Birgitta Haukdal	"Segðu mér allt"	21,964	1
10	Rúnar Júlíusson	"Ást á skítugum skóm"	—	—
11	Þórey Heiðdal Vilhjálmsdóttir	"Sá þig"	5,041	3
12	Hreimur Örn Heimisson	"Mig drejmdi lítinn draum"	—	11
13	Ragnheiður Eiríksdóttir	"Tangó"	—	—
14	Höskuldur Örn Lárusson	"Allt"	—	—
15	Jóhanna Vigdis Arnardóttir	"Þú og ég (er ég anda)"	—	—

== At Eurovision ==
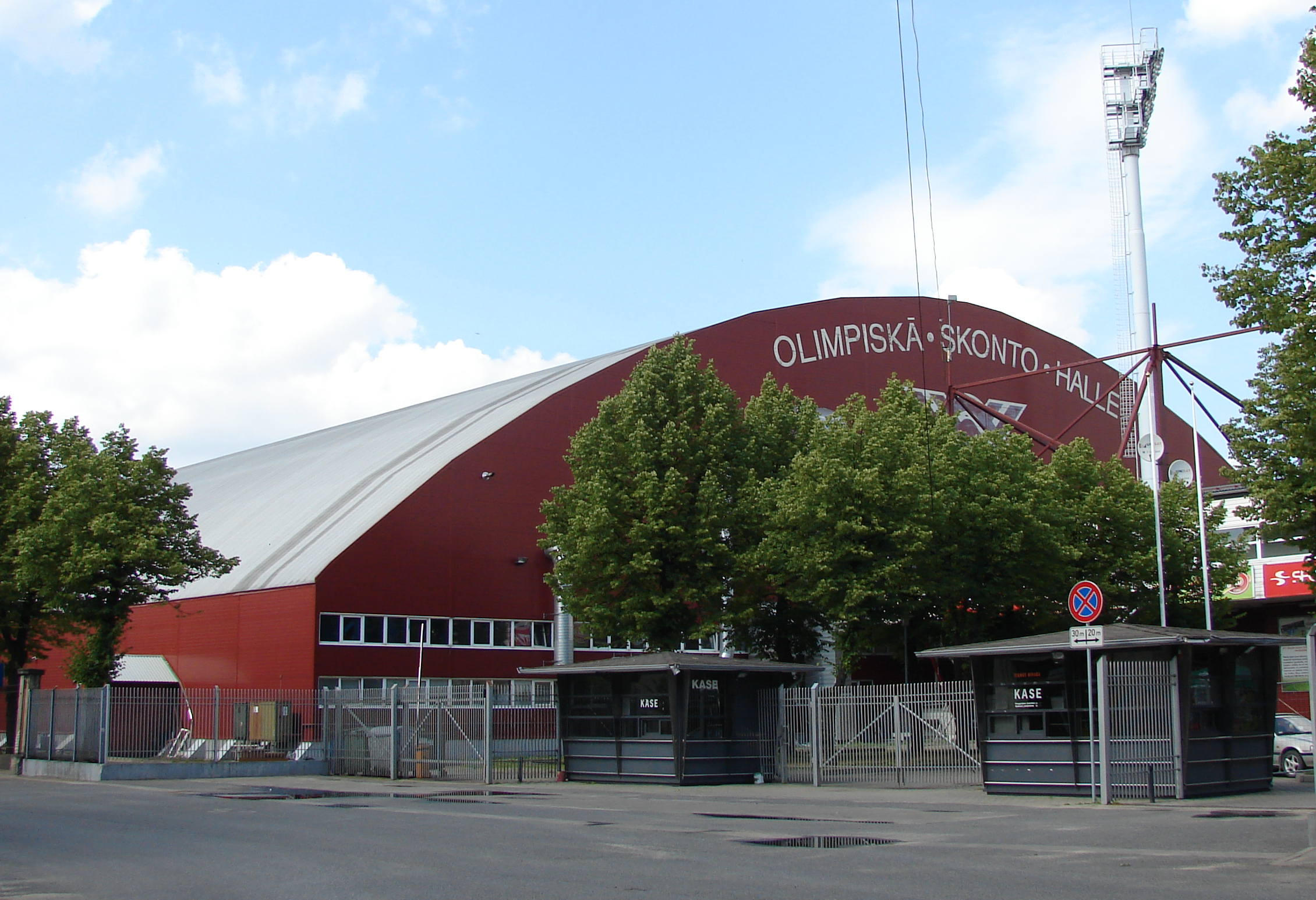
The Eurovision Song Contest 2003 took place at Skonto Hall in Riga, Latvia.

The Eurovision Song Contest 2003 took place at the Skonto Hall in Riga, Latvia, on 24 May 2003. According to the Eurovision rules, the participant list for the contest was composed of the winning country from the previous year's contest, any countries which had not participated in the previous year's contest, and those which had obtained the highest placing in the previous contest, up to the maximum 26 participants in total. The draw for running order had previously been held on 29 November 2002 in Riga, with the results being revealed during a delayed broadcast of the proceedings later that day. Iceland was set to open the show and perform in position 1, before the entry from Austria.

Birgitta was joined on stage by five backing performers: Vignir Snær Vigfússon, Hanni Bach, Hebbi Viðarsson, Regína Ósk and Margrét Eir. Ósk and Vigfússon would go on to represent Iceland in 2008 and 2011, respectively, the former as part of Euroband and the latter as part of Sjonni's Friends. Iceland finished in eighth place with 81 points.

The contest was broadcast in Iceland on RÚV television with commentary by Gísli Marteinn Baldursson, and on radio Rás 2.

=== Voting ===
Below is a breakdown of points awarded to Iceland and awarded by Iceland in the contest. The nation awarded its 12 points to Norway in the contest. RÚV appointed Eva María Jónsdóttir as its spokesperson to announce the results of the Icelandic televote during the show.

Points awarded to Iceland
Score	Country
12 points	Malta; Norway
10 points	
8 points	Turkey
7 points	Ireland; Sweden
6 points	Croatia; Netherlands
5 points	Cyprus
4 points	Slovenia; Ukraine
3 points	Belgium; Latvia
2 points	
1 point	Estonia; France; Germany; Poland

Points awarded by Iceland
Score	Country
12 points	Norway
10 points	Austria
8 points	Germany
7 points	Belgium
6 points	Spain
5 points	Sweden
4 points	Russia
3 points	Turkey
2 points	Ireland
1 point	Estonia
