= Turkey in the Eurovision Song Contest 2003 =

- Eurovision Song Contest 2003
- Participating broadcaster: Turkish Radio and Television Corporation (TRT)
- Country: Turkey
- Selection process: Internal selection
- Announcement date: 8 March 2003

Competing entry
- Song: "Everyway That I Can"
- Artist: Sertab Erener
- Songwriters: Demir Demirkan; Sertab Erener

Placement
- Final result: 1st, 167 points

Participation chronology

Turkey was represented at the Eurovision Song Contest 2003 with the song "Everyway That I Can" written by Demir Demirkan and Sertab Erener, and performed by Erener herself. The Turkish participating broadcaster, the Turkish Radio and Television Corporation (TRT), internally selected its entry for the contest. The song was presented to the public on 8 March 2003 during the TRT 1 show Sayısal Gece. This was the first time that the Turkish song was performed entirely in English at the contest.

Turkey competed in the Eurovision Song Contest which took place on 24 May 2003. Performing during the show in position 4, Turkey placed first out of the 26 participating countries, winning the contest with 167 points. This was the first win for Turkey in the Eurovision Song Contest.

== Background ==
Prior to the 2003 contest, the Turkish Radio and Television Corporation (TRT) had participated in the Eurovision Song Contest representing Turkey 24 times since its first entry in 1975. It missed the 1979 contest because Arab countries pressured the Turkish government to withdraw from the contest because of the dispute over the Status of Jerusalem, and 1994 contest due to a poor placing in the previous contest, which ultimately led to relegation. To this point, its best placing was third, achieved in 1997 with the song "Dinle" performed by Sebnem Paker and Grup Etnik. Its least successful result was in 1987 when it placed 22nd (last) with the song "Şarkım Sevgi Üstüne" by Seyyal Taner and Lokomotif, receiving 0 points in total.

As part of its duties as participating broadcaster, TRT organises the selection of its entry in the Eurovision Song Contest and broadcasts the event in the country. Since its debut at the contest in 1975, the broadcaster selected their representative through a national final with the exception of 1980 when the artist was internally selected. In order to select its representative at the 2003 contest, TRT opted to internally select both the artist and song for the first time in its competitive history.

== Before Eurovision ==
=== Internal selection ===
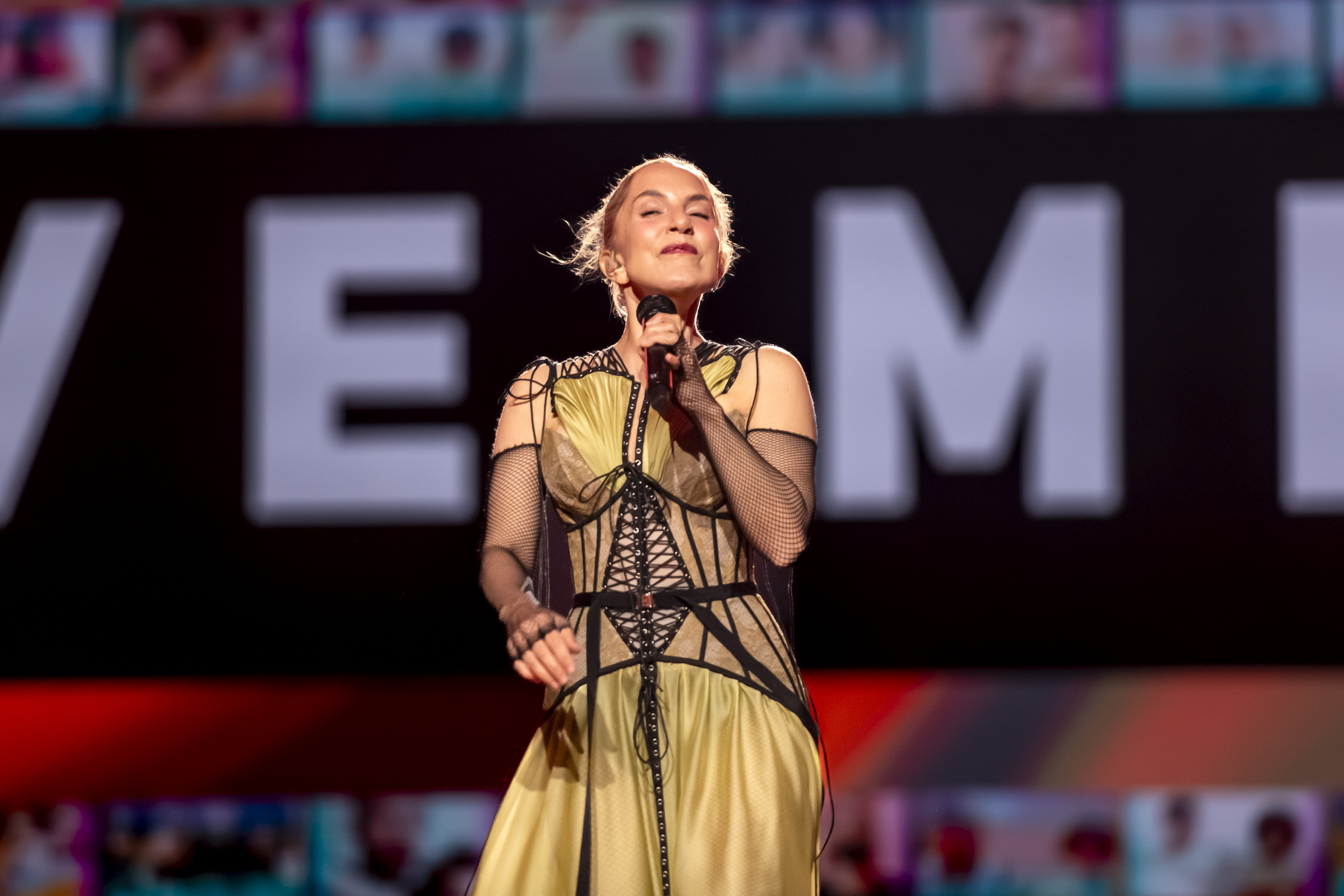
Sertab Erener (pictured in 2024) was internally selected to represent Turkey in the Eurovision Song Contest 2003

On 1 January 2003, TRT announced that they had internally selected Sertab Erener to represent Turkey in Riga. Prior to the artist announcement, the Turkish newspaper Vatan reported in November 2002 that Erener had been selected as the Turkish representative for the 2003 Eurovision Song Contest. Sertab Erener previously attempted to represent Turkey at the Eurovision Song Contest in 1990, placing sixth in the national final with the song "Sen Benimlesin". The song that Erener would perform at the contest, "Everyway That I Can", was announced on 24 February 2003 and presented to the public on 8 March 2003 during the TRT 1 show Sayısal Gece. "Everyway That I Can" was written by Sertab Erener herself together with Demir Demirkan, and was selected from three songs, all written in English, that Erener submitted to TRT for consideration.

"Everyway That I Can" became Turkey's first entry in the contest to be performed entirely in English, which created controversy with Turkish musicians and the public. The Turkish Language Association (TDK) issued a statement in which they called for Erener to participate with a song with Turkish lyrics in order to promote Turkey and its culture. At a press conference organised by TRT on 13 March 2003, Erener explained that she would be more successful if she would sing the entry in English since it is considered an international language, and that she had accepted TRT's offer to compete on the condition that she could perform her contest entry in English. TRT General Manager Yücel Yener added that their goal of allowing an English song to represent Turkey for the first time was to achieve international success for the country.

Results of the song selection
Song	Songwriter(s)	Place
"Everyway That I Can"	Demir Demirkan, Sertab Erener	1
"Mare"	Mazhar Alanson, Fuat Güner, Özkan Uğur	3
"The One"	Demir Demirkan	2

== At Eurovision ==
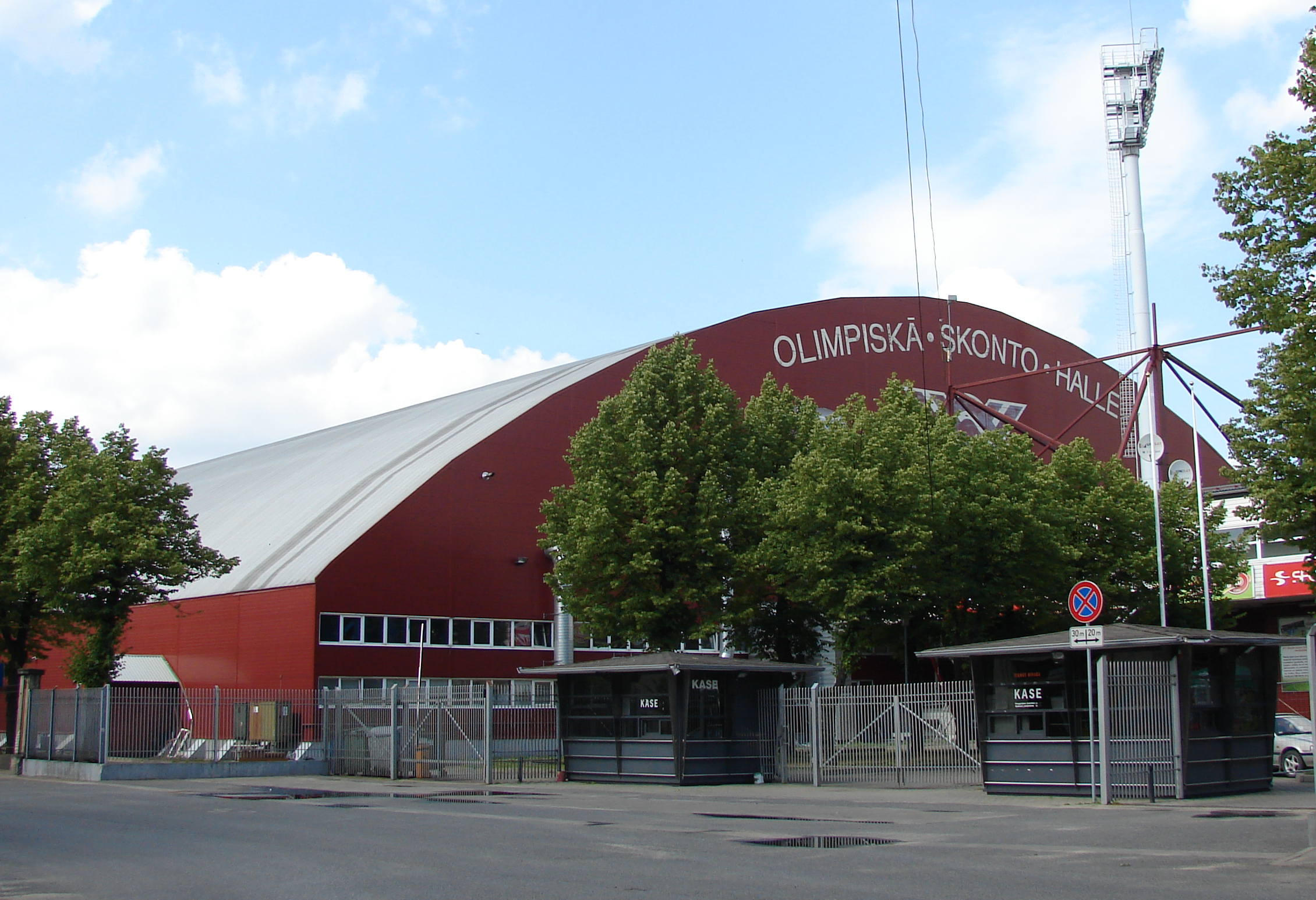
The Eurovision Song Contest 2003 took place at Skonto Hall in Riga, Latvia.

The Eurovision Song Contest 2003 took place at the Skonto Hall in Riga, Latvia, on 24 May 2003. According to the Eurovision rules, the participant list for the contest was composed of the winning country from the previous year's contest, any countries which had not participated in the previous year's contest, and those which had obtained the highest placing in the previous contest, up to the maximum 26 participants in total. The draw for running order had previously been held on 29 November 2002 in Riga, with the results being revealed during a delayed broadcast of the proceedings later that day. Turkey was set to perform in position 4, following the entry from Ireland and before the entry from Malta. Sertab Erener was joined on stage by four dancers: Anja von Geldern, Christina Van Leyen, Claudia Kraxner and Özge Fışkın, and Turkey won the contest placing first with a score of 167 points. This was Turkey's first victory in the Eurovision Song Contest.

The show was broadcast in Turkey on TRT 1 and TRT Int with commentary by Bülend Özveren.

=== Voting ===
Televoting was an obligatory voting method for all participating countries. Point values of 1–8, 10 and 12 were awarded to the 10 most popular songs of the televote, in ascending order. Countries voted in the same order as they had performed. Below is a breakdown of points awarded to Turkey and awarded by Turkey in the contest. The nation awarded its 12 points to Bosnia and Herzegovina in the contest. TRT appointed Meltem Ersan Yazgan as its spokesperson to announced the results of the Turkish televote during the final.

Points awarded to Turkey
Score	Country
12 points	Austria; Belgium; Bosnia and Herzegovina; Netherlands
10 points	Croatia; France; Germany; Norway; Romania; Slovenia
8 points	Cyprus; Portugal; Sweden
7 points	Greece; Israel; United Kingdom
6 points	
5 points	
4 points	Malta
3 points	Iceland; Spain
2 points	Poland; Ukraine
1 point	

Points awarded by Turkey
Score	Country
12 points	Bosnia and Herzegovina
10 points	Russia
8 points	Iceland
7 points	Belgium
6 points	Austria
5 points	Ireland
4 points	Greece
3 points	Croatia
2 points	Spain
1 point	Romania

== Congratulations: 50 Years of the Eurovision Song Contest ==
"Everyway That I Can" was one of fourteen Eurovision songs selected by fans to participate in the Congratulations 50th anniversary show in 2005. It was the only Turkish entry to appear in the main competition. The song was drawn to perform tenth, following "Poupée de cire, poupée de son" by France Gall and preceding "Ne partez pas sans moi" by Celine Dion.

At the end of the first round, "Everyway That I Can" was not among the five songs proceeding to the final round. It was later revealed that "Everyway That I Can" finished ninth with 104 points. It received a sole 12 points from Turkey themselves, who (unlike in standard Eurovision editions) were allowed to vote for their own entry.

=== Voting ===
Points awarded to "Everyway That I Can" (Round 1)
Score	Country
12 points	Turkey
10 points	Bosnia and Herzegovina
8 points	Germany; Netherlands
7 points	Israel; Switzerland
6 points	Finland
5 points	Romania; Russia; Serbia and Montenegro; Spain
4 points	Greece; Iceland; Macedonia
3 points	Ireland; Sweden
2 points	Belgium; Cyprus; Slovenia
1 point	Latvia; Lithuania
