= Marija Naumova =

Latvian singer (born 1973)

Marie N
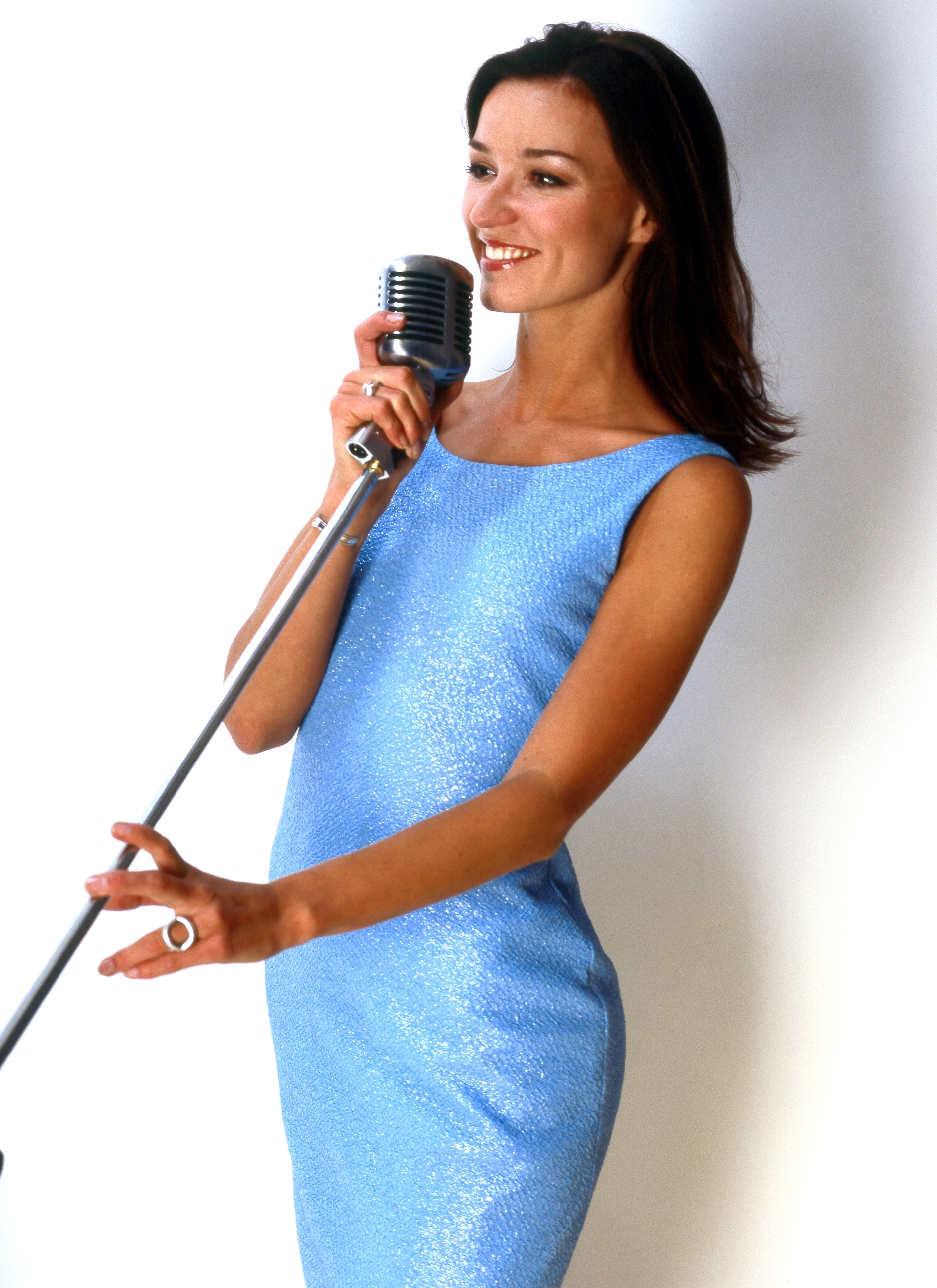
- Naumova in 2004

Background information
- Also known as: Marie N
- Born: Marija Naumova; 23 June 1973 (age 53); Riga, then part of Latvian SSR, Soviet Union
- Origin: Riga, Latvia
- Genres: pop, jazz
- Occupations: singer, songwriter
- Years active: 1995–present
- Website: www.marijanaumova.lv

Marija Naumova-Bullīta (née Naumova; born 23 June 1973), known professionally as Marija Naumova, is a Latvian singer. Under the stage name Marie N, she sings a broad range of music ranging from pop to musical theatre and jazz, and has recorded several albums, with songs in Latvian, French, English, Russian and Portuguese. In 2002, she won the Eurovision Song Contest for Latvia with her song "I Wanna".

== Biography ==
Naumova was discovered by famous Latvian musician Raimonds Pauls in 1994 and after a year she performed on TV in searches for talent. She never won, but was noticed by the audience. In 1998, she performed in a concert celebrating the 100 years jubilee of George Gershwin. In March 1998 she performed on stage in concerts with famous Latvian musicians, and one of those concerts was recorded on CD. That gave her career a boost and she began to participate in several music events, television and radio shows, and give interviews for Latvian newspapers.

Naumova's first solo album, which was completely in Russian, was released in 1999. In 2000 Latvia participated in the Eurovision Song Contest for the first time. Naumova was in the national finals but came second behind Brainstorm. In 2001, she again participated in the Latvian preselection, singing "Hey Boy Follow Me", which was voted public favourite but was not chosen by the expert jury. Naumova had to wait another year before she was finally chosen to represent Latvia with "I Wanna", for which she also wrote the music and co-wrote the lyrics. In the Eurovision Song Contest 2002, her performance of "I Wanna" won the competition and gave Latvia its first (and only) ever Eurovision win.

According to author and historian John Kennedy O'Connor in his book The Eurovision Song Contest – The Official History, despite its success at the contest, "I Wanna" gained the dubious distinction of being the first Eurovision winner that was not released outside of its own territory. Even in Latvia, the single never reached the top 30.

In November of her victory year she recorded two new solo albums: one in English, and one in Latvian. She presented the albums to the audience with a tour throughout Latvia. Naumova co-hosted the Eurovision Song Contest 2003 along with Renars Kaupers of the Latvian band Brainstorm, who came 3rd in the contest in 2000. In 2004, Naumova successfully combined her singing and acting talents in the lead role of The Sound of Music.

== Discography ==
=== Albums ===
- 1998: До светлых слёз
- 2000: Ieskaties acīs
- 2001: Ma Voix, Ma Voie (LV:Gold certification)
- 2002: On A Journey
- 2002: Noslēpumi
- 2004: Nesauciet sev līdzi
- 2005: Another Dream
- 2010: Lullabies
- 2016: Uz Ilūziju Tilta

== Television ==
Year	Title	Role	Notes
2003	Eurovision Song Contest	Presenter	alongside Renars Kaupers

== See also ==
- List of Eurovision Song Contest presenters

Awards and achievements
Preceded by (Estonia) Tanel Padar, Dave Benton and 2XL with "Everybody"	Winner of the Eurovision Song Contest; 2002	Succeeded by (Turkey) Sertab Erener with "Everyway That I Can"
Preceded by Arnis Mednis with "Too Much"	Latvia in the Eurovision Song Contest; 2002	Succeeded by F.L.Y. with "Hello from Mars"
Preceded by (Estonia) Annely Peebo and Marko Matvere	Eurovision Song Contest presenter (with Renārs Kaupers); 2003	Succeeded by (Turkey) Korhan Abay and Meltem Cumbul
