= Joachim Horn-Bernges =

German songwriter (born 1949)

- Born: 27 October 1949 (age 76); Bochum, Germany
- Occupations: Songwriter, producer
- Years active: 1970s–present

Joachim Horn-Bernges (born 27 October 1949) is a German songwriter and music producer. He has also competed in the Eurovision Song Contest as a composer several times and for different countries. In 1989, his songs competed for both Germany and Austria.

== Songwriting credits (selected) ==
- Nino de Angelo – "Flieger"
- Nino de Angelo – "Jenseits von Eden"
- Ich Troje – "Keine Grenzen – Żadnych granic"
- Thomas Forstner – "Nur ein Lied"
- Tony Wegas – "Zusammen geh'n"

== See also ==
- Category:Songs written by Joachim Horn-Bernges
