= Oleksandr Ponomariov =

Ukrainian singer (born 1973)

Oleksandr Ponomariov Олександр Пономарьов
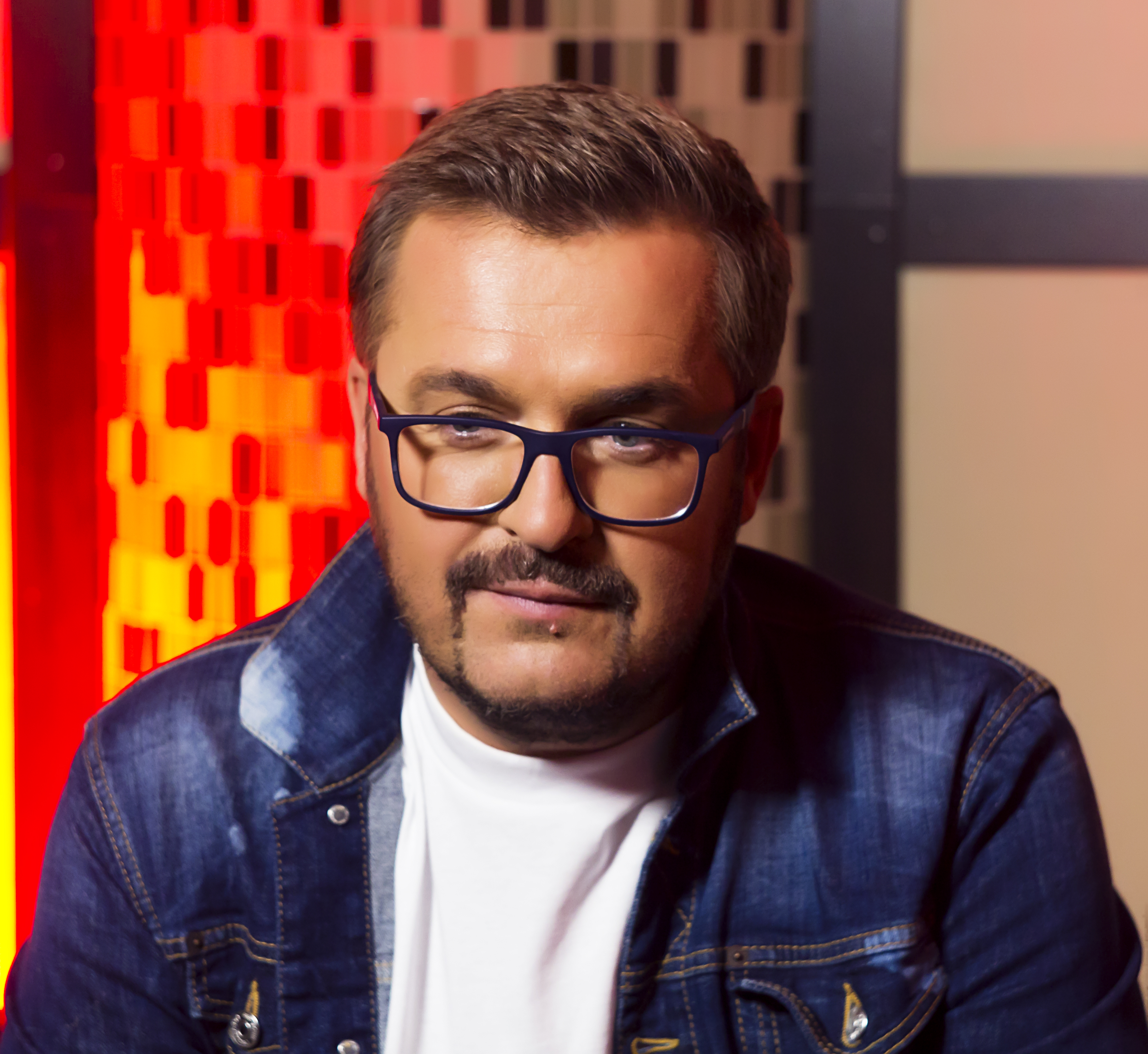

Background information
- Born: Oleksandr Ponomariov; August 9, 1973 (age 52)
- Origin: Khmelnitskiy, Ukrainian SSR, Soviet Union (now Khmelnytskyi, Ukraine)
- Genres: Pop
- Occupations: Vocalist, musician (piano), arranger
- Years active: 1992–present

Oleksandr Valeriyovych Ponomariov (Ukrainian: Олександр Валерійович Пономарьов; born August 9, 1973) is a Ukrainian singer. He has been awarded the country's "Singer of the Year" seven times.

== Early life and education ==
Ponomariov was born in Khmelnitskiy, Ukrainian SSR (now Khmelnytskyi, Ukraine). One of his early interests was boxing. When his eyesight started to deteriorate he was forbidden to fight by his doctor. While he had always enjoyed singing, he never thought that music could be his main occupation. Despite this, he applied to a music college where he encountered one drawback: he could not read music. The college professors accepted him on the basis of his excellent singing voice and allowed him to stay on the condition that he master the school's seven-year curriculum in the space of one year. He apparently succeeded.

== Career ==
Since 1992, Oleksandr has taken part in dozens of Ukrainian and international festivals. In 1998, Ukraine's government recognized Oleksandr by awarding him the title of "Honored Artist of Ukraine".

Oleksandr, performing "Hasta la vista" was the first artist ever to represent Ukraine in the Eurovision Song Contest 2003. His performance included a circus act with a contortionist and an Apollo program rocket. He finished in 14th place.

== Albums ==
- Z ranku do nochi (From Morning Till Night) (1996)
- Persha i ostannya lyubov (First and Last Love) (1997)
- Vin (He) (2000)
- Vona (She) (2001)
- Krashche (The Best) (2004)
- Ya lyublyu tilky tebe (Only You I Love) (2006)
- Z ranku do nochi (From Morning Till Night) (2006)
- Persha i ostannya lyubov (First and Last Love) (2006)
- Golden Hits (2007)
- Nichenkoyu (At Night) (2007)

Awards and achievements
| Preceded by None | Ukraine in the Eurovision Song Contest; 2003 | Succeeded by Ruslana with "Wild Dances" |
