= Norway in the Eurovision Song Contest 2003 =

- Eurovision Song Contest 2003
- Participating broadcaster: Norwegian Broadcasting Corporation (NRK)
- Country: Norway
- Selection process: Melodi Grand Prix 2003
- Selection date: 1 March 2003

Competing entry
- Song: "I'm Not Afraid to Move On"
- Artist: Jostein Hasselgård
- Songwriters: Arve Furset; VJ Strøm

Placement
- Final result: 4th, 123 points

Participation chronology

Norway was represented at the Eurovision Song Contest 2003 with the song "I'm Not Afraid to Move On", written by Arve Furset and VJ Strøm, and performed by Jostein Hasselgård. The Norwegian participating broadcaster, the Norwegian Broadcasting Corporation (NRK), organised the national final Melodi Grand Prix 2003 in order to select its entry for the contest. The broadcaster returned to the contest after a one-year absence following its relegation in 2002 as one of the bottom six entrants in 2001. Twelve entries competed in a show that took place on 1 March 2003 and the winner was determined over two rounds of public televoting. The top four entries in the first round of voting advanced to the competition's second round—the Gold Final. In the second round of public televoting, "I'm Not Afraid to Move On" performed by Jostein Hasselgård was selected as the winner with 78,460 votes.

Norway competed in the Eurovision Song Contest which took place on 24 May 2003. Performing during the show in position 18, Norway placed fourth out of the 26 participating countries, scoring 123 points.

== Background ==
Prior to the 2003 contest, the Norwegian Broadcasting Corporation (Norwegian: Norsk rikskringkasting; NRK) had participated in the Eurovision Song Contest representing Norway 41 times since its first entry in 1960. It had won the contest on two occasions: in 1985 with the song "La det swinge" performed by Bobbysocks!, and in 1995 with the song "Nocturne" performed by Secret Garden. It also had the two distinctions of having finished last in the Eurovision final more than any other country and for having the most nul points (zero points) in the contest, the latter being a record the nation shared together with Austria. The country had finished last eight times and had failed to score a point during four contests.

As part of its duties as participating broadcaster, NRK organises the selection of its entry in the Eurovision Song Contest and broadcasts the event in the country. The broadcaster has traditionally organised the national final Melodi Grand Prix to select its entry for the contest in all but one of its participation. Along with its participation confirmation, the broadcaster revealed details regarding their selection procedure and announced the organization of Melodi Grand Prix 2003 in order to select its 2003 entry.

== Before Eurovision ==
=== Melodi Grand Prix 2003 ===
Melodi Grand Prix 2003 was the 41st edition of the national final Melodi Grand Prix organised by NRK to select its entry for the Eurovision Song Contest 2003. The show took place on 1 March 2003 at the Oslo Spektrum in Oslo, hosted by Øystein Bache and was televised on NRK1 as well as streamed online at NRK's official website nrk.no. The national final was watched by 1.349 million viewers in Norway.

==== Competing entries ====
A submission period was opened by NRK between 25 September 2002 and 15 November 2002. Songwriters of any nationality were allowed to submit entries, and NRK reserved the right to directly invite certain artists and composers to compete in addition to the public call for submissions. At the close of the deadline, over 450 submissions were received. Twelve songs were selected for the competition and the competing acts and songs were revealed on 21 January 2003. Among the competing artists were former Eurovision Song Contest entrants Elisabeth Andreassen –Bettan– (who represented Sweden in 1982, Norway in 1985 as part of Bobbysocks!, Norway in 1994 alongside Jan Werner Danielsen, and Norway in 1996), Kikki Danielsson (who represented Sweden in 1985), and Lotta Engberg (who represented Sweden in 1987). The competing entries were premiered during broadcasts of the Nordic World Ski Championships 2003 between 17 and 28 February 2003.

Artist	Song	Songwriter(s)
Alfie	"One"	Alf Gunnar Nilsen
Åse Karin Hjelen	"Han kom som ein vind"	Åse Karin Hjelen, Tom Sennerud
Birgitte Einarsen	"Good Evening, Europe!"	Mads Rogde, Arve Furset, Benedicte Swendgaard
Daddy Cool	"Don't Stop"	Tante Gørilds Hobbyorkester, Erlend Gjerde, Inge Ulirk Gundersen
Don Ramage	"Perfect Tragedy"	Håvid Engmark, Alf Gunnar Nilsen, Bjørnar Løberg
Erik Jacobsen	"So You Say"	Eskil Pettersen, Jarl Ivar Andresen, Trond Hillestad
Ingvild Pedersen	"Anyway You Want It"	Thomas G:son, Stefan Brunzell
Jostein Hasselgård	"I'm Not Afraid to Move On"	Arve Furset, VJ Strøm
Kikki, Bettan & Lotta	"Din hånd i min hånd"	Thomas G:son, Elisabeth Andreassen, Petter Anthon Næss
Linda Kvam	"You've Got a Hold on Me"	Hanne Sørvaag, Thomas Wøhni, Linda Kvam
Monopole	"Wonderful Girl"	Knut Bjørnar Asphol
Soda	"Fool in Love"	Marte Hveem

==== Final ====
Twelve songs competed during the final on 1 March 2003. The winner was selected over two rounds of regional televoting. In the first round, the results of the public televote were divided into Norway's five regions and each region distributed points as follows: 1–8, 10 and 12 points. The top four entries were selected to proceed to the second round, the Gold Final, where the results of the public televote were revealed by Norway's five regions based on actual voting figures and led to the victory of "I'm Not Afraid to Move On" performed by Jostein Hasselgård with 78,460 votes. In addition to the performances of the competing entries, the interval act featured Cheezy Keys performing several past Norwegian Eurovision entries.

Final – 1 March 2003
R/O	Artist	Song	Western Norway	Northern Norway	Southern Norway	Central Norway	Eastern Norway	Total	Place
1	Ingvild Pedersen	"Anyway You Want It"	3	4	3	1	5	16	8
2	Daddy Cool	"Don't Stop"	5	5	5	4	6	25	5
3	Åse Karin Hjelen	"Han kom som ein vind"						0	12
4	Linda Kvam	"You've Got a Hold on Me"	6	6	4	5	4	25	5
5	Erik Jacobsen	"So You Say"	1			3	1	5	10
6	Birgitte Einarsen	"Good Evening, Europe!"	7	7	7	6	8	35	4
7	Alfie	"One"	10	12	10	12	7	51	2
8	Kikki, Bettan & Lotta	"Din hånd i min hånd"	8	10	8	8	10	44	3
9	Monopole	"Wonderful Girl"	4	3	6	2	3	18	7
10	Soda	"Fool in Love"	2	2	2	7		13	9
11	Jostein Hasselgård	"I'm Not Afraid to Move On"	12	8	12	10	12	54	1
12	Don Ramage	"Perfect Tragedy"		1	1		2	4	11

Gold Final – 1 March 2003
R/O	Artist	Song	Western Norway	Northern Norway	Southern Norway	Central Norway	Eastern Norway	Total	Place
1	Birgitte Einarsen	"Good Evening, Europe!"	2,693	2,036	2,709	2,309	16,231	25,978	3
2	Alfie	"One"	6,116	4,798	6,042	7,708	26,221	50,885	2
3	Kikki, Bettan & Lotta	"Din hånd i min hånd"	2,818	2,200	2,892	2,530	15,522	25,962	4
4	Jostein Hasselgård	"I'm Not Afraid to Move On"	7,890	4,532	9,627	6,580	49,831	78,460	1

=== Controversy ===
The interval act of Melodi Grand Prix 2003, performed by the group Cheezy Keys, caused a considerable amount of controversy in Latvia. Despite intending to incorporate Latvian culture into their performance, the group wore Cossack uniforms and used Russian matryoshka dolls and balalaikas. Latvian citizens threatened to boycott Norwegian goods in response, while the Latvian ambassador in Norway, Normunds Popens, criticised the improper use of symbols even for humouristic purposes and claimed that it "draw [sic] a picture of my country as if it was a part of Russia, and that's simply not true". Criticism was also made by the Norwegian ambassador in Latvia, Jan Wessel Hegg, who described it as "painfully embarrassing" and "unfortunate for Norway as a country". The group later expressed regret that they have hurt the Latvian people and confessed that they "don't know much about Latvian culture".

== At Eurovision ==
According to Eurovision rules, all nations with the exceptions of the bottom five countries in the 2002 contest competed in the final on 24 May 2003. On 29 November 2002, an allocation draw was held which determined the running order and Norway was set to perform in position 18, following the entry from Greece and before the entry from France. Norway finished in fourth place with 123 points.

In Norway, the show was broadcast on NRK1 with commentary by Jostein Pedersen as well as broadcast via radio on NRK P1.

=== Voting ===
Below is a breakdown of points awarded to Norway and awarded by Norway in the contest. The nation awarded its 12 points to Iceland in the contest. NRK appointed Roald Øyen as its spokesperson to announce the Norwegian votes during the show.

Points awarded to Norway
Score	Country
12 points	Iceland; Ireland; Sweden
10 points	Estonia
8 points	
7 points	Germany; Latvia; Netherlands; Ukraine
6 points	Belgium; Malta; Poland; United Kingdom
5 points	Portugal; Slovenia
4 points	Russia
3 points	France; Israel; Romania
2 points	Austria
1 point	

Points awarded by Norway
Score	Country
12 points	Iceland
10 points	Turkey
8 points	Austria
7 points	Sweden
6 points	Ireland
5 points	Netherlands
4 points	Poland
3 points	Belgium
2 points	Russia
1 point	Romania
