= Ukraine in the Eurovision Song Contest 2003 =

- Eurovision Song Contest 2003
- Participating broadcaster: National Television Company of Ukraine (NTU)
- Country: Ukraine
- Selection process: Internal selection
- Announcement date: Artist: 13 February 2003; Song: 21 March 2003

Competing entry
- Song: "Hasta la vista"
- Artist: Olexandr
- Songwriters: Svika Pick; Mirit Shem-Or

Placement
- Final result: 14th, 30 points

Participation chronology

Ukraine was represented at the Eurovision Song Contest 2003 with the song "Hasta la vista", composed by Svika Pick, with lyrics by Mirit Shem-Or, and performed by Oleksandr Ponomariov. The Ukrainian participating broadcaster, the National Television Company of Ukraine (NTU), internally selected its entry for the contest. The song was presented to the public on 21 March 2003. This was the first-ever entry from Ukraine in the Eurovision Song Contest.

Ukraine competed in the Eurovision Song Contest which took place on 24 May 2003. Performing during the show in position 16, Ukraine placed fourteenth out of the 26 participating countries, scoring 30 points.

== Background ==
On 25 May 2002, the Ukrainian national broadcaster, the National Television Company of Ukraine (NTU), confirmed its intentions to debut at the Eurovision Song Contest in its 2003 edition after broadcasting the 2002 edition. The broadcaster had previously planned to debut at the contest in 1993 and 1996. NTU internally selected its debut entry for the 2003 contest.

== Before Eurovision ==
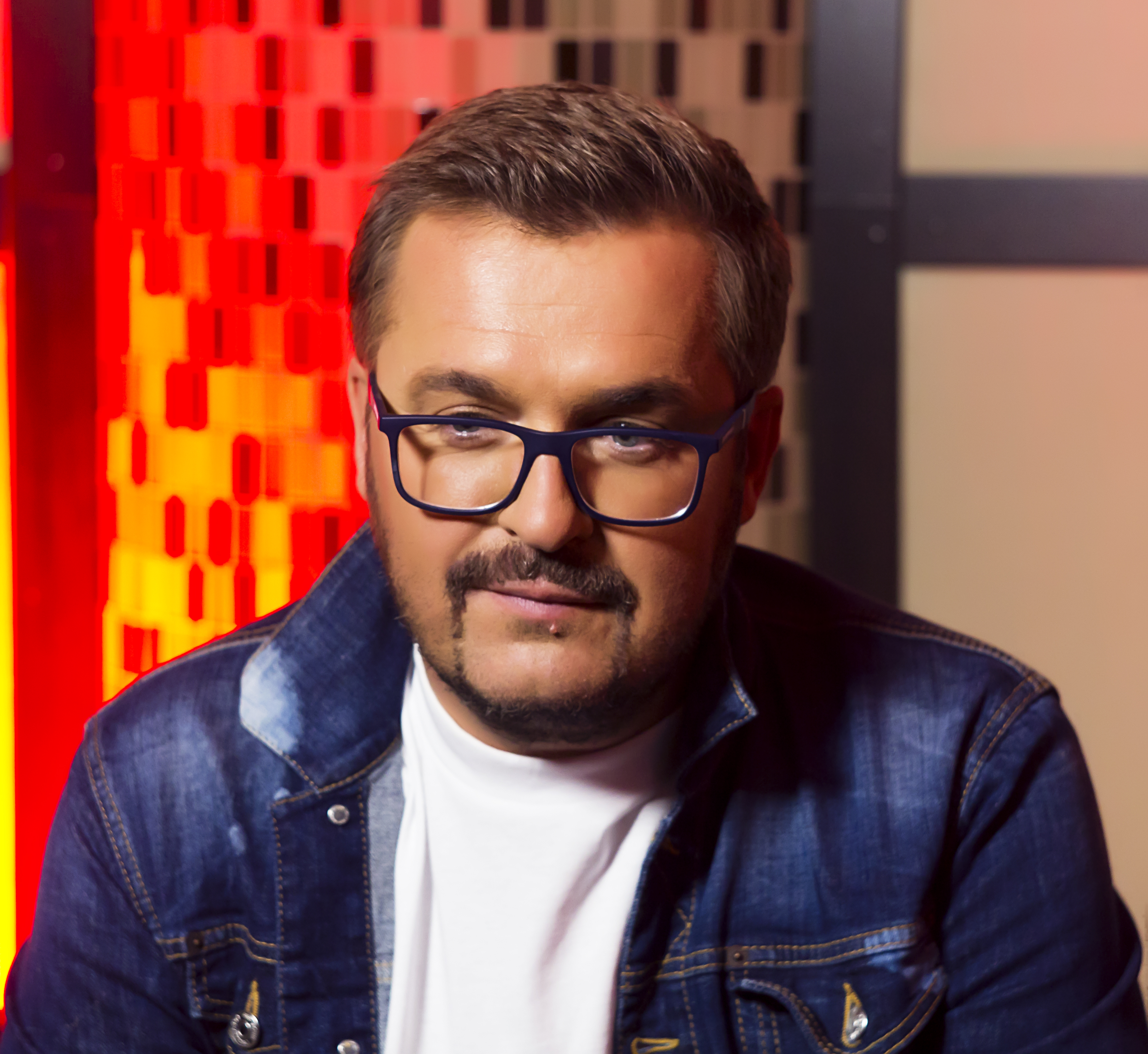
Oleksandr Ponomariov (pictured in 2017) was selected to represent Ukraine in the Eurovision Song Contest 2003

=== Internal selection ===
It was reported in October 2002 by website Esctoday that NTU had internally selected Oleksandr Ponomariov to represent Ukraine in Riga. Despite initially denying that an offer had been made by the broadcaster, Ponomariov was confirmed as the Ukrainian entrant during a press conference on 13 February 2003. On 14 March 2003, it was announced that Ponomariov would be performing the song "Hasta la vista" at the Eurovision Song Contest. The song, written by Svika Pick and Mirit Shem-Or, was selected from 52 proposals received by the singer and NTU from 20 composers worldwide. Pick had previously written the Israeli Eurovision Song Contest 1998 winning song "Diva". "Hasta la vista" was released on 21 March 2003.

=== Promotion ===
To promote "Hasta la vista" as the Ukrainian Eurovision entry, Ponomariov performed during the Latvian Eurovision national final Eirodziesma 2003 on 1 February 2003.

== At Eurovision ==
According to Eurovision rules, all nations with the exceptions of the bottom ten countries in the 2002 contest competed in the final on 24 May 2003. On 29 November 2002, a special allocation draw was held which determined the running order and Ukraine was set to perform in position 16, following the entry from the United Kingdom and before the entry from Greece. Ukraine finished in fourteenth place with 30 points.

In Ukraine, the show was broadcast on Pershyi Natsionalnyi with commentary by reporter and television presenter Dmytro Kryzhanivskyi, and radio DJ, producer and presenter Pavlo Shylko.

=== Voting ===
Below is a breakdown of points awarded to Ukraine and awarded by Ukraine in the contest. The nation awarded its 12 points to Russia in the contest. NTU appointed Liudmyla Khariv as its spokesperson to announce the Ukrainian votes during the final.

Points awarded to Ukraine
Score	Country
12 points	
10 points	Poland
8 points	Russia
7 points	
6 points	
5 points	Latvia
4 points	Israel
3 points	Estonia
2 points	
1 point	

Points awarded by Ukraine
Score	Country
12 points	Russia
10 points	Belgium
8 points	Poland
7 points	Norway
6 points	Romania
5 points	Sweden
4 points	Iceland
3 points	Portugal
2 points	Turkey
1 point	Ireland
