= Spain in the Eurovision Song Contest 2003 =

- Eurovision Song Contest 2003
- Participating broadcaster: Televisión Española (TVE)
- Country: Spain
- Selection process: Operación Triunfo 2: Gala Eurovisión
- Selection date: 17 February 2003

Competing entry
- Song: "Dime"
- Artist: Beth
- Songwriters: Jesús María Pérez; Amaya Martínez

Placement
- Final result: 8th, 81 points

Participation chronology

Spain was represented at the Eurovision Song Contest 2003 with the song "Dime" composed by Jesús María Pérez, with lyrics by Amaya Martínez, and performed by Beth. The Spanish participating broadcaster, Televisión Española (TVE), selected its entry through the second series of the reality television music competition Operación Triunfo. Three artists and songs ultimately qualified to compete in the Eurovision selection show of the competition where a public televote exclusively selected "Dime" performed by Beth as the winner, receiving 45% of the votes.

As a member of the "Big Four", Spain automatically qualified to compete in the Eurovision Song Contest. Performing in position 12, Spain placed eighth out of the 26 participating countries with 81 points.

== Background ==
Prior to the 2003 contest, Televisión Española (TVE) had participated in the Eurovision Song Contest representing Spain forty-two times since its first entry in 1961. It has won the contest on two occasions: in 1968 with the song "La, la, la" performed by Massiel and in 1969 with the song "Vivo cantando" performed by Salomé, the latter having won in a four-way tie with France, the Netherlands, and the United Kingdom. It has also finished second four times, with "En un mundo nuevo" by Karina in 1971, "Eres tú" by Mocedades in 1973, "Su canción" by Betty Missiego in 1979, and "Vuelve conmigo" by Anabel Conde in 1995. In 2002, it placed seventh with the song "Europe's Living a Celebration" performed by Rosa.

As part of its duties as participating broadcaster, TVE organises the selection of its entry in the Eurovision Song Contest and broadcasts the event in the country. In 2002, TVE used the reality television singing competition Operación Triunfo (the Spanish version of Star Academy) to select both the artist and song that would represent Spain. The procedure was continued in order to select their 2003 entry.

== Before Eurovision ==
=== Operación Triunfo 2 ===
The Spanish entry for the Eurovision Song Contest 2003 was selected through Operación Triunfo, a Spanish reality television music competition consisting of training seventeen contestants in a boarding academy in order to find new singing talent. The second series, also known as Operación Triunfo 2, took place from 7 October 2002 to 24 February 2003 at the Mediapark Studios in Sant Just Desvern (Barcelona), hosted by Carlos Lozano. The competition was broadcast on La Primera and TVE Internacional. The top three contestants competed in the Eurovision selection show, Gala Eurovisión, which consisted of two shows on 10 and 17 February 2003. Each contestant performed three candidate songs, selected by an evaluation committee consisting of representatives of TVE, Gestmusic and Vale Music from more than 200 submitted songs, and the winner was decided exclusively through a public televote. The competing songs and the allocations were announced on 3 February 2003.

Contestant qualified to "Gala Eurovisión"

Contestant	Age	Residence	Episode of elimination	Place finished (Overall ranking)
Ainhoa	22	Galdakao	Gala Final	1st
Manuel	21	Isla Cristina	Gala Final	2nd
Beth	20	Súria	Gala Final	3rd
Nández	24	Cádiz	Gala Final	4th
Hugo	24	Seville	Gala Final	5th
Joan	25	Barcelona	Gala Final	6th
Tony	21	Tenerife	Gala 13	7th
Nika	22	Torrejón de Ardoz	Gala 12	8th
Vega	23	Córdoba	Gala 11	9th
Danni	20	Jaén	Gala 10	10th
Elena	19	Barcelona	Gala 9	11th
Tessa	20	Valencia	Gala 8	12th
Marey	18	Cádiz	Gala 7	13th
Cristie	24	Fuengirola	Gala 6	14th
Enrique	27	Navarra	Gala 5	15th
Miguel	25	Ibiza	Gala 4	16th
Mai	24	Madrid	Gala 3	17th
Saray	18	Alicante	Gala 0	Not selected
Marcos	26	Barcelona	Gala 0	Not selected
Jano	25	Palma de Mallorca	Gala 0	Not selected

==== Song selection ====
The song selection round of Gala Eurovisión took place on 10 February 2003 and consisted of two rounds of voting. In the first round, an in-studio jury eliminated one song per contestant. The five members of the in-studio jury were Pilar Tabares (music director of TVE), Sergio Dalma (singer, represented Spain in 1991), José Luis Uribarri (television presenter and director, commentator of the Eurovision Song Contest for Spain), Joaquín Hurtado (program coordinator at Cadena Dial) and Rafael Fernández (webmaster of eurofestival.net). In the second round, a public televote eliminated an additional song per contestant. In addition to the performances of the competing entries, the guest performer was jury member Sergio Dalma.

First Round – 10 February 2003
R/O	Artist	Song	Songwriter(s)	Result
1	Beth	"La vida sin ti"	Jesús María Pérez; Amaya Martínez	—N/a
2	Manuel	"Viviré, moriré"	David Jiménez; Pablo Pinilla; David Santisteban	Advanced
3	Ainhoa	"Mi razón de vivir"	Rafael Artesero	Advanced
4	Manuel	"Santa Lucía"	Jordi Cubino	Advanced
5	Ainhoa	"Con la fuerza del corazón"	Miguel Gallardo	Advanced
6	Beth	"Dime"	Jesús María Pérez; Amaya Martínez	Advanced
7	Ainhoa	"Viva la noche"	Jordi Cubino	—N/a
8	Beth	"Cerrando heridas"	José Abraham	Advanced
9	Manuel	"Sueña con ese momento"	Daniel Ambrojo	—N/a

Second Round – 10 February 2003
Artist	Song	Result
Manuel	"Santa Lucía"	—N/a
Manuel	"Viviré, moriré"	Qualified
Ainhoa	"Con la fuerza del corazón"	—N/a
Ainhoa	"Mi razón de vivir"	Qualified
Beth	"Cerrando heridas"	—N/a
Beth	"Dime"	Qualified

==== Final ====
The final of Gala Eurovisión took place on 17 February 2003. The winner, "Dime" performed by Beth, was selected exclusively through a public televote which ran between 10 and 17 February 2003. In addition to the performances of the competing entries, guest performers included two of the Operación Triunfo 2 finalists Hugo and Miguel Nández.

Final – 17 February 2003
R/O	Artist	Song	Televote	Place
1	Ainhoa	"Mi razón de vivir"	31%	2
2	Manuel	"Viviré, moriré"	24%	3
3	Beth	"Dime"	45%	1

== At Eurovision ==
As a member of the "Big Four", Spain automatically qualified to compete in the Eurovision Song Contest 2003 on 24 May 2003. During the allocation draw on 29 November 2002, Spain was drawn to perform in position 12, following the entry from Russia and before the entry from Israel. At the conclusion of the final, Spain placed eighth in the final, scoring 81 points.

In Spain, the show was broadcast on La Primera with commentary by José Luis Uribarri.

=== Voting ===
Below is a breakdown of points awarded to Spain and awarded by Spain in the contest. The nation awarded its 12 points to Belgium in the contest. TVE appointed Anne Igartiburu as its spokesperson to announce the Spanish televote during the final.

Points awarded to Spain
Score	Country
12 points	Israel; Portugal
10 points	Belgium
8 points	
7 points	Croatia
6 points	Cyprus; Iceland; Russia
5 points	Greece; Netherlands; Romania
4 points	Sweden
3 points	
2 points	Turkey
1 point	Slovenia

Points awarded by Spain
Score	Country
12 points	Belgium
10 points	Romania
8 points	Austria
7 points	Sweden
6 points	Russia
5 points	Poland
4 points	Germany
3 points	Turkey
2 points	Portugal
1 point	Israel
