= Portugal in the Eurovision Song Contest 2003 =

- Eurovision Song Contest 2003
- Participating broadcaster: Radiotelevisão Portuguesa (RTP)
- Country: Portugal
- Selection process: Artist: Internal selection Song: Canção para Eurovisão 2003
- Selection date: Artist: 9 January 2003; Song: 2 March 2003

Competing entry
- Song: "Deixa-me sonhar (só mais uma vez)"
- Artist: Rita Guerra
- Songwriter: Paulo Martins

Placement
- Final result: 22nd, 13 points

Participation chronology

Portugal was represented at the Eurovision Song Contest 2003 with the song "Deixa-me sonhar (só mais uma vez)" written by Paulo Martins and performed by Rita Guerra. The Portuguese participating broadcaster, Radiotelevisão Portuguesa (RTP), organised the national final Canção para Eurovisão 2003 in order to select its entry, after having previously selected the performer internally. RTP returned to the Eurovision Song Contest after a one-year absence following their withdrawal in 2002 as one of the bottom six countries in the 2001 contest. The winning song of the national final was selected exclusively by public televoting. "Deixa-me sonhar (só mais uma vez)" emerged as the winning song with 75% of the votes.

The song competed in the Eurovision Song Contest which took place on 24 May 2003. Performed during the show in position 7, it placed twenty-second out of the 26 participating songs from different countries, scoring 13 points.

== Background ==
Prior to the 2003 contest, Radiotelevisão Portuguesa (RTP) had participated in the Eurovision Song Contest representing Portugal thirty-six times since its first entry in 1964. Its highest placing in the contest was sixth, achieved in 1996 with the song "O meu coração não tem cor" performed by Lúcia Moniz. Its least successful result has been last place, which it has achieved on three occasions, most recently in 1997 with the song "Antes do adeus" performed by Célia Lawson. The Portuguese entry has also received nul points on two occasions; in 1964 and 1997.

RTP confirmed its participation in the 2003 Eurovision Song Contest on 29 November 2002. The broadcaster has traditionally selected its entry for the Eurovision Song Contest via the music competition Festival da Canção, with an exception in 1988 when it selected its entry internally. Despite the initial announcement that the selection of the 2003 Portuguese entry would involve the reality singing competition Operação Triunfo, the broadcaster internally selected the artist due to scheduling conflicts and organized a national final in order to select the song.

== Before Eurovision ==
=== Artist selection ===
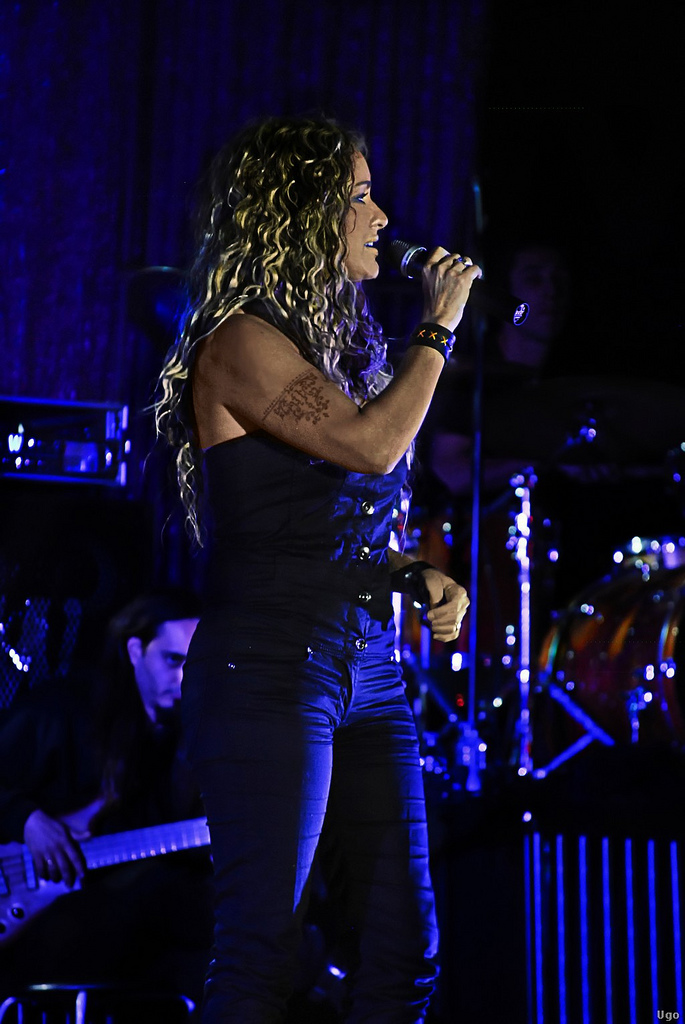
RTP internally selected Rita Guerra to represent Portugal in the Eurovision Song Contest 2003

On 9 January 2003, RTP announced that it had internally selected Rita Guerra as its representative in Riga. Guerra previously attempted to represent Portugal at the Eurovision Song Contest, placing second in Festival da Canção 1992 with the song "Meu amor inventado em mim". RTP also announced that her song for the contest would be chosen through a national final.

=== Canção para Eurovisão 2003 ===
Composers were able to submit their songs for the competition between 9 January 2003 and 5 February 2003. Three songs were selected from 500 submissions received and revealed on 18 February 2003. The national final consisted of two shows held during the first season of the reality singing competition Operação Triunfo, which took place at the Endemol TV Studios in Mem-Martins, hosted by Catarina Furtado and broadcast on RTP1 and RTP Internacional. The first show took place on 23 February 2003 where all three competing songs were performed by Rita Guerra. The winning song was selected solely by a public televote that opened following the first show and closed during the second show on 2 March 2003, when "Deixa-me sonhar (só mais uma vez)" was announced as the winning song.

Final – 2 March 2003
| R/O | Song | Songwriter(s) | Televote | Place |
|---|---|---|---|---|
| 1 | "Prazer no pecado" | Ménito Ramos | 15% | 2 |
| 2 | "Estes dias sem fim" | Rui Miguel Soares Correia, Laura Santos, Raquel Marcos | 10% | 3 |
| 3 | "Deixa-me sonhar (só mais uma vez)" | Paulo Tomé Martins da Encarnação | 75% | 1 |

== At Eurovision ==
The Eurovision Song Contest 2003 took place at the Skonto Hall in Riga, Latvia, on 24 May 2003. According to the Eurovision rules, the participant list for the contest was composed of the winning country from the previous year's contest, any countries which had not participated in the previous year's contest, and those which had obtained the highest placing in the previous contest, up to the maximum 26 participants in total. The draw for running order had previously been held on 29 November 2002 in Riga, with the results being revealed during a delayed broadcast of the proceedings later that day. Portugal was set to perform in position 7, following the entry from Bosnia and Herzegovina and before the entry from Croatia. Portugal finished in twenty-second place with 13 points.

RTP broadcast the show on RTP1 and RTP Internacional with commentary by Margarida Mercês de Melo.

=== Voting ===
Below is a breakdown of points awarded to Portugal and awarded by Portugal in the contest. The nation awarded its 12 points to Spain in the contest. RTP appointed Helena Ramos to announce the top 12-point score awarded by the Portuguese televote.

Points awarded to Portugal
| Score | Country |
|---|---|
| 12 points | |
| 10 points | |
| 8 points | |
| 7 points | |
| 6 points | France |
| 5 points | |
| 4 points | |
| 3 points | Ukraine |
| 2 points | Ireland; Spain |
| 1 point | |

Points awarded by Portugal
| Score | Country |
|---|---|
| 12 points | Spain |
| 10 points | Austria |
| 8 points | Turkey |
| 7 points | Ireland |
| 6 points | Belgium |
| 5 points | Norway |
| 4 points | Russia |
| 3 points | Sweden |
| 2 points | France |
| 1 point | Malta |
