= List of artists who reached number one on the Spanish Singles Chart =

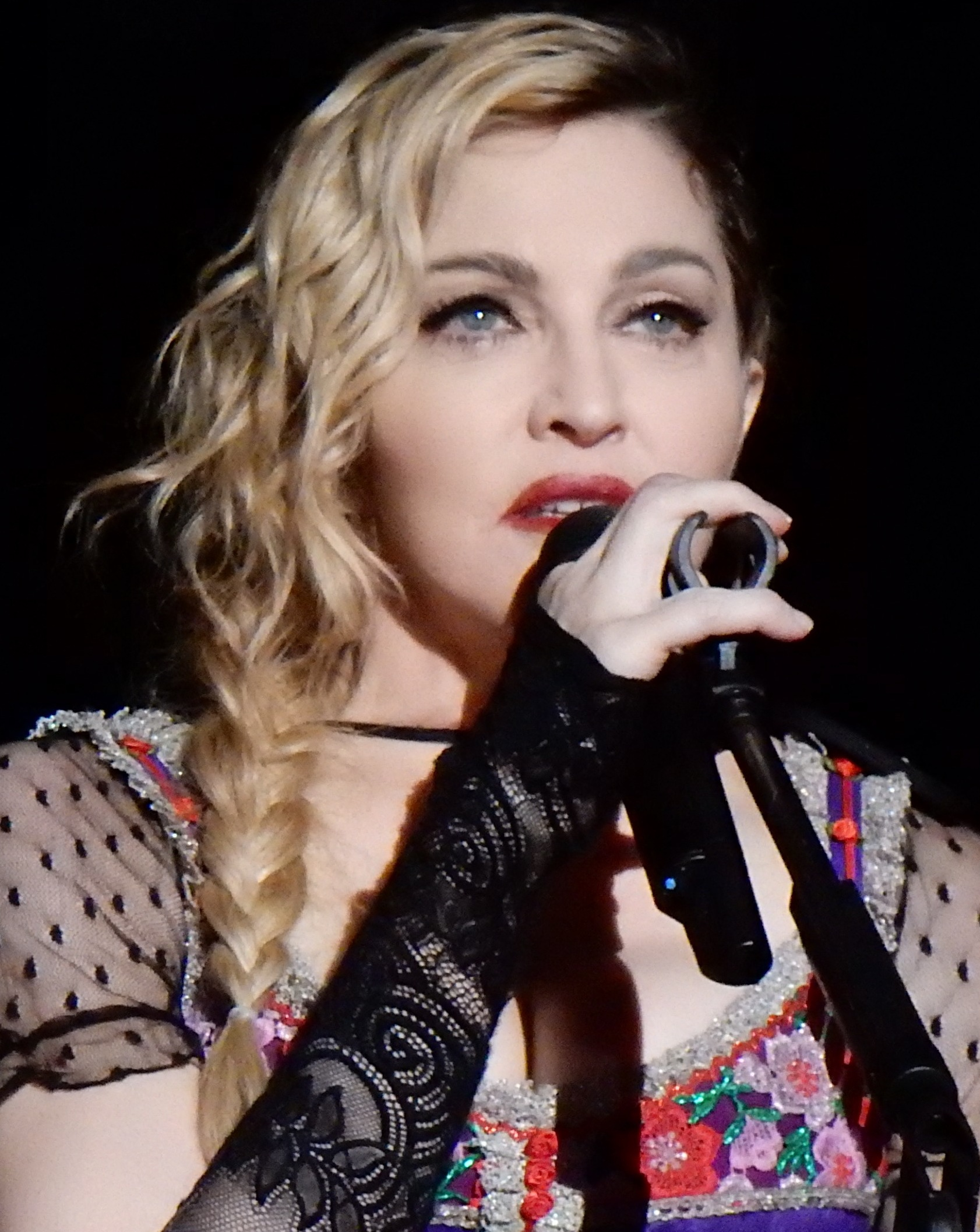
Madonna holds the record for the most number-one songs and by a female artist with 21.

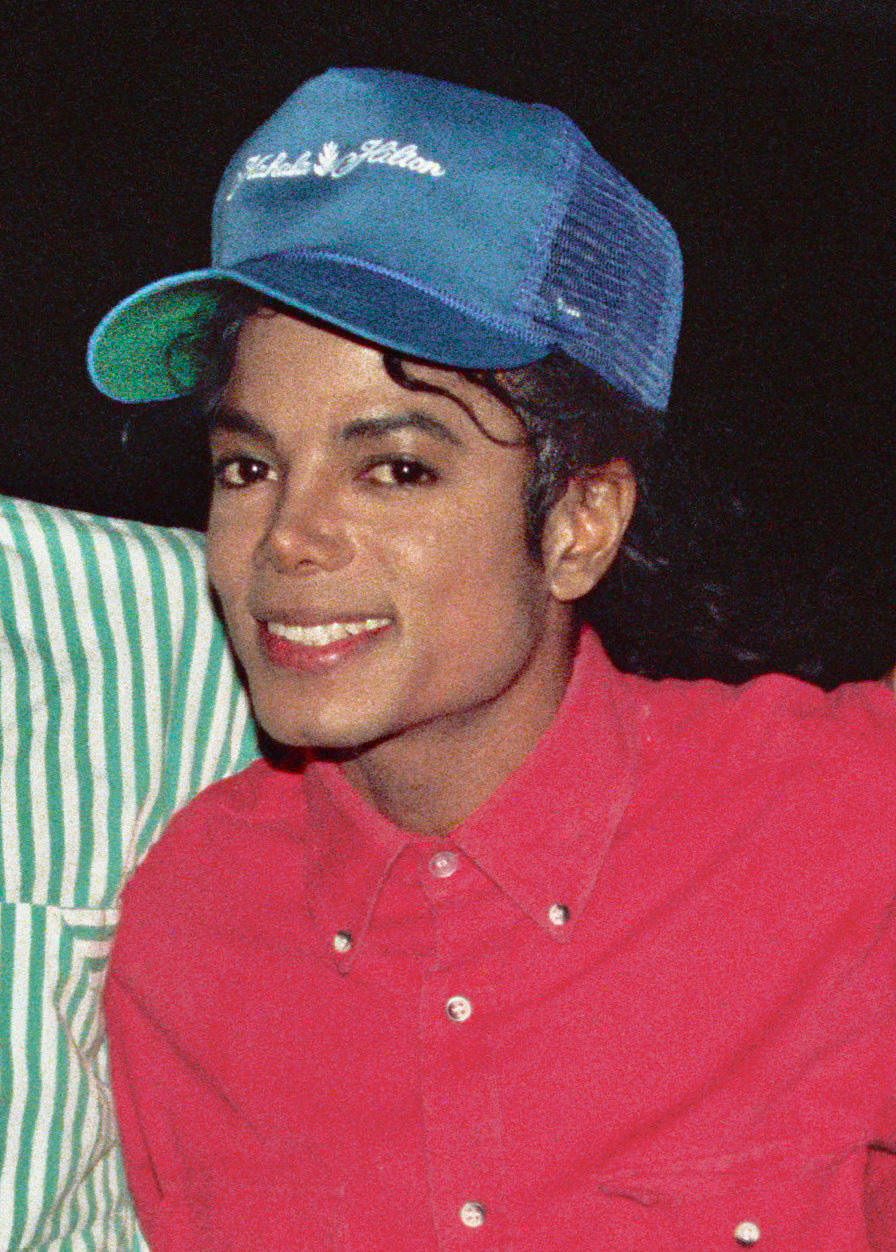
Michael Jackson holds the record for the most number-one songs by a male artist with 20.

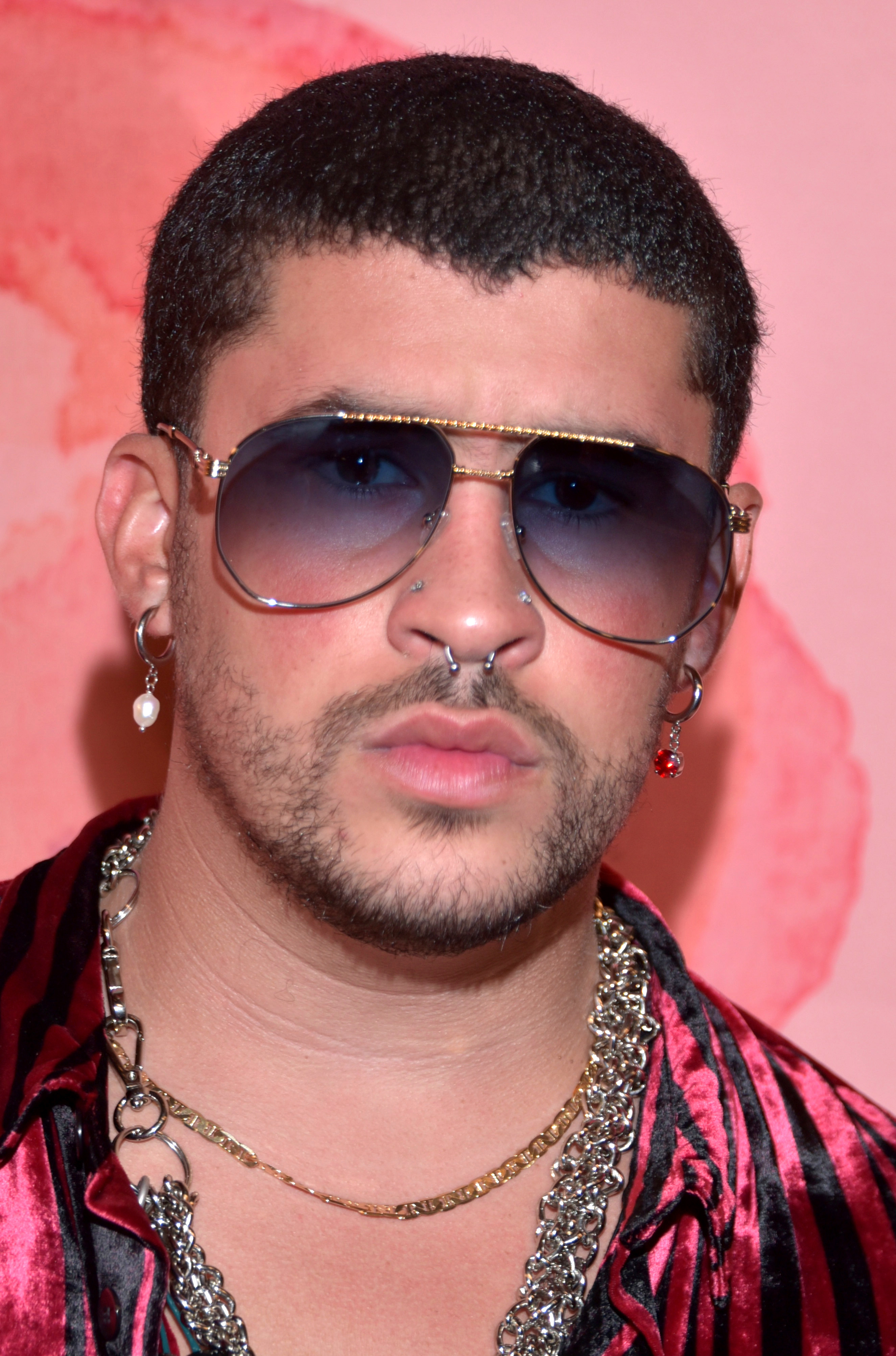
Bad Bunny (pictured) and Quevedo hold the record for the most number-one songs by a Latin artist with 18.

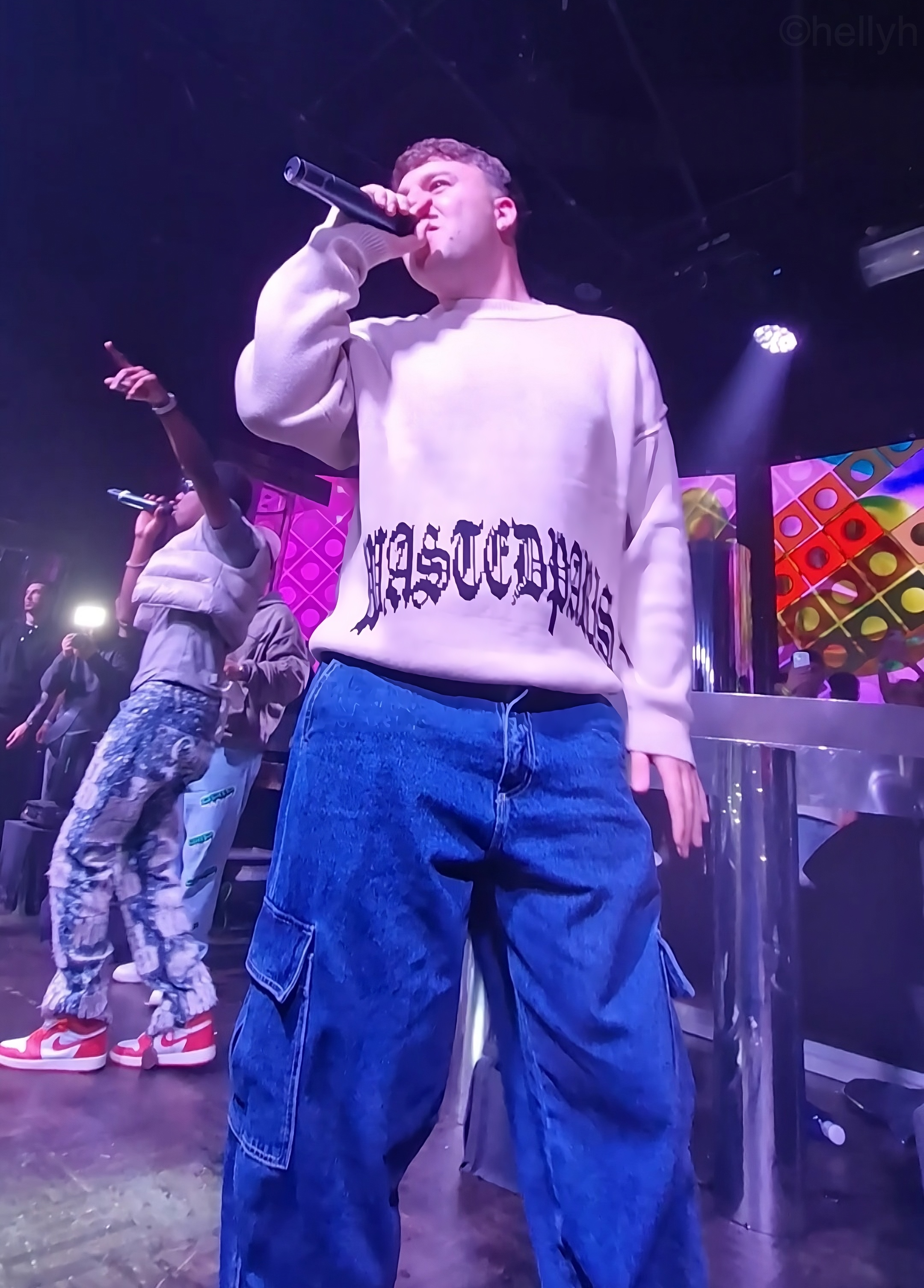
Quevedo holds the record for the most number-one songs by a Spanish artist with 18.

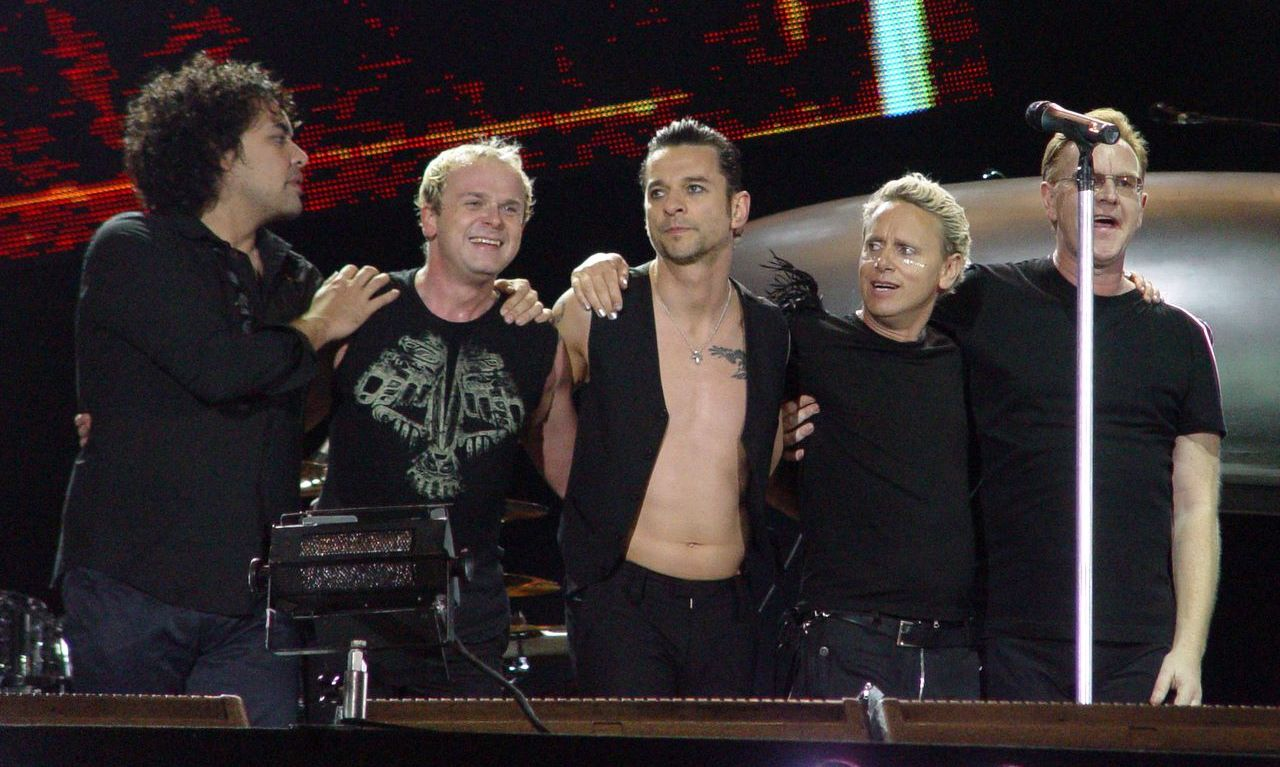
Depeche Mode hold the record for the most number-one songs by a band with 10.

This is a list of recording artists who have reached number one on the singles chart in Spain, published by Productores de Música de España (PROMUSICAE) since 1959.

- All acts are listed alphabetically.
- Solo artists are alphabetized by last name, Groups by group name excluding "El", "La", "Las", and "Los".
- Each act's total of number-one singles is shown after their name.
- All artists who are mentioned in song credits are listed here; this includes one-time pairings of otherwise solo artists and those appearing as featured. Members of a group who reached number one are excluded, unless they hit number one as a solo artist.

== 0–9 ==
- 112 (1)
- 2 Fabiola (1)
- 2 Unlimited (2)
- 6ix9ine (1)

== A ==
- Anuel AA (5)
- Isabel Aaiún (1)
- ABBA (1)
- Pablo Abraira (2)
- El Alfa (1)
- El Arrebato (1)
- Gregory Abbott (1)
- Ace of Base (3)
- Adele (1)
- Aerosmith (1)
- Luis Aguilé (2)
- Christina Aguilera (4)
- Aitana (5)
- The Alan Parsons Project (1)
- Alaska y Dinarama (3)
- Alaska y Los Pegamoides (1)
- Al Bano and Romina Power (1)
- Morris Albert (1)
- Pablo Alborán (7)
- Rauw Alejandro (7)
- Alejo (1)
- Alexia (1)
- Alizée (1)
- Alleh (1)
- Paul Anka (1)
- Marc Anthony (2)
- Amaral (1)
- Amnesia (1)
- Anastacia (2)
- The Animals (1)
- Richard Anthony (2)
- The Archies (1)
- Aqua (1)
- Rosana Arbelo (2)
- Arcángel (1)
- Atawalpa (1)
- Rick Astley (2)
- Astrud (1)
- Auryn (1)
- Avicii (2)
- Charles Aznavour (1)
- Azul y Negro (1)

== B ==
- Cardi B (1)
- Rels B (1)
- Backstreet Boys (3)
- Bad Bunny (18)
- Bad Gyal (1)
- Elsa Baeza (1)
- Tonino Baliardo (1)
- J Balvin (9)
- Baltimora (1)
- Band Aid 20 (1)
- Band Aid 30 (1)
- Rigoberta Bandini (1)
- The Bangles (1)
- Bar-Kays (1)
- Gary Barlow (2)
- Andrés Do Barro (1)
- Carlos Baute (1)
- Juan Bau (1)
- B.B.E. (1)
- The Beach Boys (1)
- The Beatles (9)
- Bee Gees (4)
- Beéle (2)
- Lou Bega (1)
- Ana Belén (3)
- Belinda (2)
- Beth (1)
- Bia (1)
- Justin Bieber (1)
- Big Mountain (1)
- Bigla the Kid (1)
- Bimbo Jet (1)
- David Bisbal (6)
- Bizarrap (8)
- Björk (2)
- The Black Eyed Peas (1)
- Benny Blanco (1)
- Blind Guardian (1)
- Blue 4 You (1)
- Blondie (1)
- Bloodhound Gang (1)
- El Bobe (1)
- DJ Bobo (1)
- Bon Jovi (2)
- Jon Bon Jovi (1)
- Boney M (3)
- Miguel Bosé (7)
- Boys Town Gang (1)
- Nino Bravo (2)
- Los Bravos (2)
- Break Machine (1)
- Brotherhood of Man (1)
- Los Brincos (5)
- Brray (1)
- La Buena Vida (1)
- Descemer Bueno (1)
- Enrique Bunbury (5)
- Buraka Som Sistema (1)
- David Bustamante (1)
- The Buggles (1)

== C ==
- Melanie C (2)
- Caballero (2)
- Francis Cabrel (1)
- Cruz Cafuné (2)
- Café Crème (1)
- Cali & El Dandee (3)
- Los Canarios (1)
- Juan Antonio Canta (1)
- Irene Cara (1)
- Kim Carnes (1)
- Raffaella Carrá (1)
- Cast of High School Musical (Spain) (2)
- El Cata (1)
- Roberto Carlos (3)
- Manuel Carrasco (1)
- Tino Casal (3)
- Caterina Caselli (1)
- C.C. Catch (1)
- Mariah Carey (1)
- Cepeda (1)
- La Charanga Del Tío Honorio (1)
- Chayanne (3)
- Chenoa (1)
- The Chemical Brothers (3)
- Cher (1)
- Chicago (1)
- Chimo Bayo (2)
- Chloe (1)
- Christophe (1)
- Circus (1)
- Petula Clark (1)
- Richard Clayderman (1)
- Clarent (2)
- Riccardo Cocciante (2)
- Cooper (1)
- Lápiz Conciente (1)
- The Communards (3)
- Chencho Corleone (1)
- Chicory Tip (1)
- Christie (1)
- Tony Christie (1)
- Omar Courtz (1)
- Corona (1)
- Jhay Cortez (2)
- Nikka Costa (1)
- The Cranberries (1)
- Crazy Frog (3)
- Elvis Crespo (1)
- Ororo (1)
- Co.Ro (1)
- Crystal Waters (1)
- Raúl Fuentes Cuenca (1)
- The Cure (3)
- Culture Club (1)
- Miley Cyrus (1)

== D ==
- Pino D'Angiò (1)
- Daft Punk (1)
- Darell (2)
- David DeMaría (1)
- Georgie Dann (1)
- F. R. David (1)
- Dawn (1)
- Lynsey de Paul (1)
- Deacon Blue (1)
- Kiki Dee (1)
- Dellafuente (1)
- Delaossa (1)
- Los Del Rio (1)
- Los DelTonos (1)
- Deluxe (1)
- Depeche Mode (10)
- Desireless (1)
- Los Diabos (4)
- Diana Ross (1)
- Dire Straits (1)
- Celine Dion (2)
- Dino (1)
- DJ Jazzy Jeff & the Fresh Prince (1)
- Dogma Crew (1)
- Double You (1)
- Dover (2)
- Dr. Alban (1)
- Drake (1)
- Duki (1)
- Dúo Dinámico (1)
- Bob Dylan (1)

== E ==
- Niño de Elche (1)
- Electric Light Orchestra (3)
- Ellegibo (1)
- Eminem (2)
- Enigma (1)
- Manolo Escobar (1)
- Gloria Estefan (3)
- Yaiza Esteve (1)
- Estopa (3)
- Estirpe (1)
- Europe (1)
- Faith Evans (1)
- Evelyn Thomas (1)
- EX-3 (2)

== F ==
- Ricardo F (1)
- Fairground Attraction (1)
- Falco (1)
- Familia Telerín (1)
- Fangoria (5)
- Farruko (1)
- Feid (3)
- José Feliciano (2)
- Felix (1)
- Luisa Fernandez (1)
- Fine Young Cannibals (1)
- Lolita Flores (1)
- Rosario Flores (1)
- Luis Fonsi (2)
- Jimmy Fontana (1)
- Formula V (1)
- Zucchero Fornaciari (1)
- The Four Tops (1)
- Fraktal 2 (1)
- José el Francés (1)
- Frankie Goes to Hollywood (1)
- Freshlyground (1)

== G ==
- Becky G (3)
- Karol G (7)
- Wilfred y la Gagna (1)
- Lady Gaga (5)
- Dave Gahan (1)
- France Gall (1)
- Miguel Gallardo (1)
- Nio Garcia (2)
- Gary Low (2)
- Leif Garrett (1)
- Gazebo (1)
- Gente De Zona (2)
- George Baker Selection (1)
- De la Ghetto (1)
- Sandro Giacobbe (1)
- Gipsy Kings (1)
- Carlos Mejía Godoy y los de Palacagüina (1)
- Tata Golosa (1)
- Goldfrapp (1)
- Selena Gomez (1)
- Loretta Goggi (1)
- Gonzy (1)
- Goombay Dance Band (1)
- Gorillaz (1)
- Ellie Goulding (1)
- Eddy Grant (1)
- Green Day (1)
- Ana Guerra (1)
- David Guetta (1)
- El Guincho (1)
- Guns N' Roses (1)
- Guru Josh (1)
- Gypsy Teens (1)

== H ==
- La Habitación Roja (1)
- Haddaway (2)
- Abhir Hathi (1)
- Hall & Oates (1)
- Hampenberg (1)
- Albert Hammond (2)
- George Harrison (1)
- Procol Harum (1)
- Ofra Haza (1)
- Patrick Hernandez (1)
- Héroes del Silencio (1)
- Himno oficial del centenario (1)
- Mary Hopkin (1)
- Whitney Houston (4)
- La Húngara (1)
- Huntrix (1)
- Hygo (1)

== I ==
- I Collage (1)
- Enrique Iglesias (7)
- Julio Iglesias (5)
- Imagination (1)
- Inna (1)
- Lola Índigo (1)
- Innocence (1)
- Iron Maiden (3)
- Natalie Imbruglia (1)
- Iván (3)

== J ==
- ATL Jacob (1)
- Jean Jacques (1)
- Nicky Jam (2)
- Jamiroquai (1)
- Janet Jackson (1)
- Michael Jackson (20)
- Jam & Spoon (1)
- Jarcha (1)
- Jean Michel Jarre (1)
- Carlos Jean (1)
- Jeanette (1)
- María Jesús y su Acordeón (1)
- Vika Jigulina (1)
- Elton John (2)
- Johnny & Charley (1)
- Jive Bunny and the Mastermixers (2)
- Jordy (1)
- Emilio José (1)
- Tom Jones (3)
- Juanka (1)
- Juan y Junior (2)
- Judeline (1)
- Juhn (1)
- Juseph (1)
- JX (1)

== K ==
- Kaoma (1)
- Karina (1)
- Mory Kanté (1)
- Ketama (1)
- Las Ketchup (1)
- Alicia Keys (1)
- Kidd Voodoo (1)
- King Africa (1)
- Mark Knopfler (1)
- The Korgis (1)

== L ==
- L.A. Style (1)
- Cherry Laine (1)
- Rita Lee (1)
- Los Legendarios (1)
- John Lennon (1)
- Annie Lennox (1)
- Level 42 (1)
- Lilly Wood and the Prick (1)
- Lime (1)
- Nueva Linea (1)
- Lipps Inc (1)
- Los Lobos (1)
- Paulo Londra (3)
- Loona (1)
- Londonbeat (1)
- Jennifer Lopez (3)
- Pablo López (1)
- The Love Unlimited Orchestra (1)
- Lil' Kim (1)
- Limahl (1)
- Lucenzo (1)
- DJ Luian (1)
- Demi Lovato (1)
- Lunay (1)

== M ==
- Macaco (1)
- Madonna (21)
- Real Madrid (1)
- Juan Magan (3)
- Mägo de Oz (2)
- Daniel Magal (1)
- Casper Magico (1)
- Miriam Makeba (1)
- Malú (2)
- Víctor Manuel (1)
- Manu Chao (1)
- Maluma (2)
- Mambo Kingz (1)
- Manhattan Transfer (1)
- Victor Manuel (4)
- Pedro Marín (1)
- Bruno Mars (1)
- Dani Martín (1)
- Ricky Martin (2)
- Sam Martin (1)
- Vanesa Martín (1)
- Germano Enrico Martina (1)
- Marey (1)
- Massiel (1)
- Edward Maya (1)
- Paul McCartney (6)
- MC Sar & the Real McCoy (1)
- Van McCoy (1)
- George McCrae (1)
- Scott McKenzie (1)
- Mecano (4)
- Glenn Medeiros (1)
- Melendi (1)
- Melody (1)
- Freddie Mercury (1)
- Metallica (1)
- George Michael (7)
- MC Miker G & DJ Sven (1)
- MFSB (1)
- Micky (1)
- Middle of the Road (1)
- Mikaela (1)
- Robert Miles (1)
- Nicki Minaj (1)
- Kylie Minogue (3)
- Missy Elliott (1)
- Milli Vanilli (1)
- Miami Sound Machine (1)
- Young Miko (1)
- Mocedades (3)
- Modern Talking (4)
- Modjo (1)
- Amaia Montero (2)
- Omar Montes (1)
- Mora (4)
- Morad (3)
- Claudia Mori (1)
- Miguel Ángel Muñoz (1)
- Mungo Jerry (1)
- Murray Head (1)
- Musical Youth (1)
- Mýa (1)

== N ==
- Nacho (2)
- Nacho cano y los osm (1)
- Miguel Nández (1)
- Mónica Naranjo (5)
- Natti Natasha (2)
- Nathalie et Christine (1)
- Olivia Newton-John (3)
- New Trolls (1)
- The New Vaudeville Band (1)
- Nicki Nicole (2)
- Nightwish (1)
- Nirvana (1)
- Alex de la Nuez (1)

== O ==
- Gilbert O'Sullivan (1)
- Oasis (1)
- OBK (1)
- Mike Oldfield (1)
- Oliver Onions (1)
- Don Omar (2)
- One Direction (1)
- Operación Triunfo (2)
- Opus (1)
- Orchestral Manoeuvres in the Dark (2)
- María Ostiz (1)
- Ottawan (1)
- Manolo Otero (1)
- Shalim Ortiz (1)
- The Outhere Brothers (1)
- Ovy on the Drums (1)
- Mark Owen (1)
- Ozuna (5)
- O-Zone (1)

== P ==
- Paco Pil (2)
- Robert Palmer (1)
- La Pantera (2)
- Sylvia Pantoja (1)
- Ryan Paris (1)
- Ray Parker Jr. (1)
- Juan Pardo (1)
- Don Patrico (1)
- Rita Pavone (1)
- Los Payos (1)
- Peaches & Herb (1)
- Pecos (2)
- Los Pekenikes (1)
- Nathy Peluso (1)
- Fran Perea (1)
- José Luis Perales (3)
- Pet Shop Boys (3)
- Pic-Nic (1)
- Pimpinela (1)
- Pink (3)
- Pitbull (5)
- Los Planetas (2)
- Plavka (1)
- The Police (1)
- The Popcorn Makers (1)
- Pop-Tops (2)
- Por Ellas (1)
- Elvis Presley (1)
- Prince (1)
- Propaganda (1)
- Proyecto Uno (1)
- PSY (1)
- Puff Daddy (1)

== Q ==
- Suzi Quatro (2)
- Queen (2)
- Quevedo (18)
- Justin Quiles (1)
- Iñigo Quintero (1)

== R ==
- Robert Ramirez (1)
- Rammstein (1)
- Ramón (1)
- Rochy RD (1)
- Redone (2)
- Reincidentes (1)
- Ramirez (1)
- Eros Ramazzotti (1)
- J. Rapallo (1)
- Raphael (singer) (3)
- JC Reyes (3)
- Nicolas Reyes (1)
- Ricchi e Poveri (1)
- Ritchie Family (1)
- Cliff Richard (1)
- Lionel Richie (1)
- Rihanna (1)
- Miguel Ríos (1)
- Andy Rivera (1)
- Kiko Rivera (1)
- Lucho RK (1)
- ROBI (1)
- Rockwell (1)
- Mala Rodríguez (1)
- The Rolling Stones (2)
- Tony Ronald (1)
- Mark Ronson (1)
- Rosalía (13)
- Demis Roussos (4)
- Roxette (1)
- Prince Royce (2)
- Paulina Rubio (1)
- Cristina Sánchez Ruiz (1)
- Jennifer Rush (1)
- Rusowsky (1)
- Barry Ryan (1)
- Emilia Rydberg (1)
- Rvssian (1)

== S ==
- Joaquín Sabina (1)
- Saiko (5)
- Lorenzo Santamaría (1)
- Sandy & Papo (1)
- Santana (1)
- Santabárbara (1)
- Romeo Santos (2)
- Tony Santos (1)
- Alejandro Sanz (4)
- Marta Sánchez (2)
- Paloma San Basilio (1)
- Scatman John (2)
- Camilo Sesto (7)
- Robin Schulz (1)
- Scooter (1)
- Scorpia (1)
- Travis Scott (1)
- Sech (1)
- Rafa González-Serna (1)
- Sensity World (1)
- Shakira (11)
- Sandie Shaw (1)
- The Shocking Blue (1)
- Shotta (1)
- Sia (1)
- Silver Convention (1)
- Simon & Garfunkel (1)
- Sin With Sebastian (1)
- Frank Sinatra (1)
- Nancy Sinatra (1)
- Skizoo (1)
- Sky (1)
- The Smashing Pumpkins (1)
- DJ Snake (1)
- Snap! (4)
- Snow (1)
- Pastora Soler (1)
- Jimmy Somerville (1)
- The Soul City Symphony (1)
- Spagna (1)
- Spanic (1)
- Spanish Fly (1)
- Britney Spears (3)
- Bruce Springsteen (2)
- Sigue Sigue Sputnik (1)
- Stardust (1)
- Ayra Starr (1)
- Stars On 45 (1)
- Lisa Stansfield (1)
- Princess Stéphanie of Monaco (1)
- Henry Stephen (1)
- Rod Stewart (2)
- The Steve Miller Band (1)
- Barbra Streisand (1)
- El Sueño de Morfeo (1)
- Sugarhill Gang (1)
- Sugarless (1)
- Supa T & The Party Animals (1)
- Tony Sweat (1)
- Taylor Swift (1)

== T ==
- T.I. (1)
- Tacabro (1)
- Take That (3)
- Tainy (2)
- Taiu (1)
- Tamara (1)
- C. Tangana (6)
- t.A.T.u. (1)
- Tarlisa (1)
- David Tavaré (1)
- Tatool (1)
- Technotronic (2)
- Michel Teló (1)
- Terra Wan (1)
- Chanel Terrero (1)
- Robin Thicke (1)
- Naim Thomas (1)
- Justin Timberlake (3)
- Ana Torroja (1)
- Myke Towers (9)
- Umberto Tozzi (3)
- Meghan Trainor (1)
- John Travolta (2)
- Los Tres Sudamericanos (1)
- Mari Trini (1)
- Trueno (2)
- Yves Tumor (1)
- Manuel Turizo (3)
- Tina Turner (2)
- Twenty 4 Seven (1)
- Bonnie Tyler (1)

== U ==
- U2 (8)
- Danni Úbeda (1)
- La Unión (1)
- USA for Africa (1)

== V ==
- Fórmula V 91)
- Dei V (1)
- Vega (1)
- Concha Velasco (1)
- VideoKids (1)
- Hervé Vilard (1)
- Violadores del Verso (1)
- Viva (1)
- Carlos Vives (1)
- Laurent Voulzy (1)

== W ==
- W Sound (1)
- Alan Walker (1)
- Anita Ward (1)
- Wax (1)
- The Weeknd (1)
- Jay Wheeler (1)
- Barry White (1)
- The Who (1)
- Des'ree (2)
- Will.i.am (1)
- Andy Williams (1)
- Willy William (1)
- Wisin (2)
- Pharrell Williams (4)
- Whigfield (1)
- White Town (1)
- Robbie Williams (2)
- Tony Wilson (1)
- Stevie Wonder (3)

== X ==
- Xtreme (1)
- Xuxa (1)

== Y ==
- Yahritza y su Esencia (1)
- Ya Kid K (1)
- Yandar & Yostin (1)
- Daddy Yankee (6)
- Sebastián Yatra (2)
- Yorghaki (1)

== Z ==
- Zager & Evans (1)
- Zzoilo (1)
