= Azkena Rock Festival =

Spanish underground rock festival

The Azkena Rock Festival (a.k.a. ARF) is one of the most relevant Spanish rock festivals. It is celebrated in Vitoria-Gasteiz (Álava) organized by Last Tour International. ARF is notorious due to its diverse cartel of groups and for the submerse 'chill' environment of the festival. It is aimed to underground public, escaping commercial mainstream agenda.

In 2006, the festival sold over 44,000 tickets, the most in its history, due to the presence of Pearl Jam. Some other bands included Iggy & The Stooges, Wilco, Alice Cooper, Social Distortion, Tool, Queens of the Stone Age, Ray Davies, Bad Religion, Sex Pistols, Deep Purple, The Black Crowes, Hanoi Rocks, Fun Lovin Criminals, Kiss, Slash, Imelda May or Bad Brains. In 2011 the festival celebrated the 10th anniversary with the "rocker" topic: Las Vegas.

== Editions ==
=== 2002 edition ===
The inaugural festival was celebrated in the Azkena Gasteiz and was organized by Muskerra (an organization of the Basque Country). The duration was of three days:12–14 September 2002.

First edition of the ARF
September 12	September 13	September 14
Backyard Babies	Supersuckers	Mudhoney
The Revolvers	The Bellrays	Five Horse Johnson
Sex Museum	Racing Slabs	Diamond Dogs
	Federation X	Bonzos

=== 2003 edition ===
The second edition of the festival featured several improvements. Taking place in Mendizorroza, Vitoria-Gasteiz, there were two different stages where concerts took place with little gap between performances. The Stooges were chosen as the headline act that year. In total 12,000 fans traveled to the city of Vitoria for the Azkena Rock Festival. The revenue was used to fund future editions of the festival.

Second edition of the ARF
September 12		September 13
Stage 1	Stage 2	Stage 1	Stage 2
	Fireballs Of Freedom		The Dictators
Iggy & The Stooges		Ray Davies
	Cracker		The Hellacopters
The Cramps		Steve Earle & The Dukes
	The Jayhawks		Teenage Fanclub
Ben Vaughn		Hermano
	Jason Ringenberg & The Nashville Allstars		The Jeevas
La Secta		Cherry Valence
	Zein?		Jet Lag
Paniks		Petti & Etxeko Utza

=== 2004 edition ===
This was the most accidented edition in the history of the festival. Some names were known in May 2004 that were: Urge Overkill, Redd Kross, The Screamin' Cheetah Wheelies, Turbonegro, The Soundtrack Of Our Lives, Stacey Earle & Mark Stuart, Josh Rouse Band, Hoodoo Gurus. In the most important or the heads was the group from NY, DKT/MC which were the heads of the first edition in Spain. In late June it was confirmed the rest groups which were: Velvet Revolver, Bide Ertzean, Five Horse Johnson, Jonny Kaplan & The Lazy Stars, Mark Lanegan Band, Matthew Sweet, The Mooney Suzuki which finally did not attend.

On 12 July it was said on the radio that the New York Dolls were coming and this made the festival even more attractive. This was confirmed in the news and newspapers. The festival took place over four days rather than the previous two. The first day was 9 September, with performances by the New York Dolls, Five Horse Johnson and Urge Overkill.

Third edition of the ARF
September 9	September 10		September 11		September 12
Carpa Mondosonoro	Stage San Miguel	Stage Azkena	Stage San Miguel	Stage Azkena	Carpa Mondosonoro
New York Dolls	Radio Birdman		Turbonegro		Roger McGuinn
Five Horse Johnson	DKT/MC5		Flamin' Groovies		Mike Farris
Urge Overkill	Ryan Adams		Violent Femmes		Walter Salas Humara
		Fun Lovin' Criminals		Screamin' Cheetah Wheelies
	Mark Lanegan		The Wildhearts
		Urge Overkill		Matthew Sweet
	Josh Rouse		Obligaciones
		Mother Superior		Backyard Babies
	Stacey Earle & Mark Stuart		The Silos
		Bide Ertzean		Jonny Kaplan & The Lazy Stars
			Kuraia

=== 2005 edition ===
4th edition of the ARF
September 1		September 2		September 3
Stage Heineken	Stage Azkena	Stage Heineken	Stage Azkena	Stage Heineken	Stage Azkena
	Wilco	The Dwarves		Monster Magnet
	The Steepwater Band	Deep Purple		Queens of the Stone Age
	Los Deltonos	Social Distortion		The Pogues
	The Soulbreaker Company		Wilco		Bad Religion
		Gov't Mule		Television
			Drive-By Truckers		Beasts of Bourbon
		Masters of Reality		Juliette & The Licks
			Rose Hill Drive		Electric Six
		Towers of London		Brant Bjork & The Bros
			Split 77		Hash

=== 2006 edition ===
5th edition of the ARF
August 31		September 1		September 2
Stage Heineken	Stage Azkena	Stage Heineken	Stage Azkena	Stage Heineken	Stage Azkena
The Misfits		New York Dolls		Nick Oliveri and the Mondo Generator
Iggy & The Stooges		Buckcherry		Pearl Jam
	Green On Red	Redd Kross			My Morning Jacket
The Waterboys			Big Star	Wolfmother
	Young Fresh Fellows	Eagles of Death Metal			Supagroup
Guarro			Gang of Four	The Nomads
	Sharon Stoner	The Bottle Rockets			Kim Salmon & The Surrealists
			Marah	Berri Txarrak
		Uzzhuaia			Kriston

=== 2007 edition ===
The 6th edition of the ARF
August 31		September 1
StageHeineken	Carpa Rock Heineken	Stage Heineken	Carpa Rock Heineken
Heavy Trash		The Answer
Tool		DKT/MC5
Diamond Dogs & The Silver Cats Horns		Hoodoo Gurus
Roky Erickson & The Explosives		The Mooney Suzuki
	Giant Sand		The Cynics
Brant Bjork & The Bross		Quique González y la Aristocracia del Barrio
	Two Gallants		Super 400
Josele Santiago		Clawfinger
	Los Coronas	Sexty Sexers
	Las Furias		Hoey & The Mussels

This year was considered to be a transition year because of the many rumors of the abolishment of the festival. But finally 40,000 people attended over the three days duration. It was not until summer that it was decided that the headline act was Tool. It was not as successful as it was supposed it was going to be.

=== 2008 edition ===
This year was again rumored that the Azkena was lost because the bad organization of the festival and also because of the constant changes they made with the choices. But this year the Ayuntamiento of Vitoria-Gasteiz made an effort and paid €500,000 so it would last three days. The first groups were known before the local government had given approval to do the Azkena for these days. The headliner was Dinosaur Jr. and that was the reason why many people attended this year.

7th edition of the ARF
September 4		September 5		September 6
Stage 1	Stage 2	Stage 1	Stage 2	Stage 1	Stage 2
The Lemonheads		The Quireboys		The Jon Spencer Blues Explosion
Marky Ramone			Blind Melon		Los Lobos
	The BossHoss	Sex Pistols		Dinosaur Jr.
Radio Moscow		Ray Davies		The Jayhawks
	Hayseed Dixie		Danko Jones		The Gutter Twins
Yawning Man		The Sonics		Duff McKagan's Loaded
	Lagartija Nick		Blue Cheer		Orange Goblin
		Hanoi Rocks		John Cale & Band
			Truly		Sex Museum
		Animal Alpha		Baby Woodrose
			Sorkun		The Royal Cream
			Viaje a 800		Las Culebras

=== 2009 edition ===
In 2009 the Azkena Rock again gaining strength with one of his biggest posters in years thanks to the introduction of well-known singers like The Black Crowes or Alice Cooper. The performance of the band of brothers Robinson was one of the most anticipated by fans and did not disappoint audiences. "Electric Eel Shock were perhaps the only band that could have followed such a show and close the main stage in outstanding fashion", according to attendees.

8th edition of the ARF Line Up
May 14		May 15		May 16
Stage 1	Stage 2	Stage 1	Stage 2	Stage 1	Stage 2
Hardcore Superstar		Electric Eel Shock		The Toy Dolls
Juliette & The New Romantics			The Zombies		TSOOL
The Breeders		The Black Crowes		Alice Cooper
The Freaks		Soul Asylum		Fun Lovin Criminals
White Denim			El Paperboy Reed		Mike Farris & TRRR
Burning		Bad Brains		Molly Hatchet
The Inspector Cluzo			Dr Dog		Woven Hand
Jenny Dee & The Deelinquents		The Fabulous Thunderbirds		The New Christs
			Howlin Rain		Jonny Kaplan and The Lazy Stars
		Elliot Blood		Dan Auerbach
			Jon Ulecia & Cantina Bizarro		Reverend Parker

=== 2010 edition ===
9th edition of the ARF Line Up
June 24		June 25		June 26
Stage 'Alex Chilton'	Stage 'Doug Fieger'	Stage 'Alex Chilton'	Stage 'Doug Fieger'	Stage 'Alex Chilton'	Stage 'Doug Fieger'
The Black Lips		Kiss	Imperial State Electric	Bad Religion	Toilet Boys
Airbourne		Slash featuring Myles Kennedy	The Damned	The Hives	NRQB
Gov't Mule		Imelda May	Teddy Thompson	Chris Isaak	The Cubical
The Hold Steady		Dan Baird & Homemade Sin	El Vez	Bob Dylan	Maggot Brain
Kitty, Daisy & Lewis			The Hot Dogs	Robert Gordon & The Gang They Couldn't Hang	Audience
The Jim Jones Revue			'77	The Russian Roulettes
The Legendary Shack Shackers
Baskery
Bronze

=== 2011 edition ===
10th edition of the ARF Line Up
June 23	June 24			June 25
Solomon Burke Stage	Solomon Burke Stage	Ben Keith Stage	Monster Stage	Solomon Burke Stage	Ben Keith Stage	Monster Stage
Ozzy Osbourne	Queens of the Stone Age	Clutch	This Drama	Danzig	Bright Eyes	Arizona Baby
Kyuss Lives!	Primus	Bad Brains	Rival Sons	Paul Weller	Band of Horses	The Whybirds
Rob Zombie	Cheap Trick	Atom Rhumba	Dirty York	Brian Setzer' Rockabilly Riot	New Bomb Turks	The Knocknouts
The Cult	Reverendo Horton Heat	Blue Rodeo		Gregg Allman
Black Country Communion	The Riff Truckers			The Aves Brothers
EELS				Juke Box Racket
Bizardunak

=== 2012 edition ===
11th edition of the ARF Line Up
June 14		June 15			June 16
Levon Helm Stage	Robin Gibb Stage	Levon Helm Stage	Adam Yauch Stage	Robin Gibb Stage	Levon Helm Stage	Adam Yauch Stage	Robin Gibb Stage
Dropkick Muphys	Steel Panther	Ozzy Osbourne & Friends	Danko Jones	Drick Brave & The Blackbeats	The Darkness	Brian Jonestown Massacre	Triggerfinger
Pentagram	Graveyard	The Mars Volta	Black Label Society	Luger	My Morning Jacket	Hank 3	Charles Bradley & His Extraordinaires
Status Quo	Porco Bravo	Rich Robinson Band	Gun	Gallows	Lynyrd Skynyrd	M. Ward	The Union
Twisted Sister	Israel Nash Gripka	Lisabö	Willis Drumoond	The Screaming Tribesmen	Frank Turner & The Sleeping Souls	North Mississippi Alistars Duo	Ben Kweller
Blue Öyster Cult	Maha's Miracle Tonic			The Amazing			Lee Fields & The Expressions
Si Craunston				Pontus Snibb 3			Sallie Ford & The Sounds Outside

=== 2013 edition ===
June 28	June 29
The Black Crowes The Smashing Pumpkins M Clan Alberta Cross The Sword The Sheepdogs Horisont Sex Museum The Socks Quaoar	The Gaslight Anthem Gov't Mule Rocket from the Crypt Los Enemigos Walking Papers JJ Grey & Mofro Uncle Acid & the Deadbeats Troubled Horse Heaven's Basement Los Zigarros

=== 2014 edition ===
Concerts
June 20	June 21
Scorpions The Stranglers Seasick Steve Unida Turbowolf Marah Hudson Taylor Monster Truck Bombus 13 Left to Die Attikus Finch Bourbon The Midnight Travellers Vucaque	Blondie Violent Femmes Wolfmother Joe Bonamassa The Strypes Deap Vally Kadavar Royal Thunder The Temperance Movement Niña Coyote eta Chico Tornado The Soulbreaker Company Niño y Pistola Arenna Bluenaticos

=== 2015 edition ===
Concerts
June 19	June 20
ZZ Top Television performing Marquee Moon L7 D-Generation Black Mountain The Dubrovniks JD McPherson The White Buffalo The Last Internationale Lee Bains III & the Glory Fires Nico Duportal and His Rhytim Dudes Sven Hammond Mad Martin Trio Highlights	Mastodon Ocean Colour Scene Red Fang Cracker Kvelertak Eagles of Death Metal Woven Hand OFF! Reigning Sound John Paul Keith Powersolo The Outside Hours Black Horde

=== 2016 edition ===
June 17	June 18
Danzig The Hellacopters Lucinda Williams Gutterdämmerung feat. Henry Rollins Blackberry Smoke Vintage Trouble Jean Beauvoir Daniel Romano Jared James Nichols Luke Winslow-King The London Souls The Sex Organs Los Brazos The Flying Scarecrow	The Who Imelda May Radio Birdman Refused 091 Supersuckers The Scientist Fields of the Nephilim Marky Ramone's blitzkrieg 40 years of punk The Vintage Caravan Raveneye Cobra The Milkyway Express Sumisión City Blues

=== 2017 edition ===
Concerts
June 23	June 24
John Fogerty Cheap Trick The Hellacopters Graveyard King's X Hellsingland Underground The Meteors The Shelters Tygers of the Pang Tang The Godfathers Crank County Daredevils The Soulbreaker Company Fetixe Los Mambo Jambo King Automatic The Cyborgs Vurro Shakin' Brothers Reyes Torío Billie & the Kids	Chris Isaak The Cult Union Carbide Productions Michael Kiwanuka Loquillo Thunder Bloodlights Inglorious Psycotica Pat Capocci Buck & Evans SCR Wyoming & Los Insolventes Bob Log III Pelo Mono The Devils Lost Angeles Bob Cosby
Trashville
June 23	June 24
King Automatic The Cyborgs Vurro Shakin' Brothers Reyes Torío Documental Rocknrollers Lucha Extrema. Sin Indulto y Sin Empate Dj Mr.Howard The Old Fox & The Hen The Bears	Bob Log III Pelo Mono The Devils Lost Angeles DJs Bob Cosby DJs Proyección documental Rocknrollers Lucha Extrema Sin Indulto y Sin Empate Pat Briggs (Psychotica) DJs
