= Operación Triunfo series 2 =

Operación Triunfo
- Series 2
- Hosted by: Carlos Lozano
- Judges: Pilar Tabares; Pilar Zamora; Narcís Rebollo
- Winner: Ainhoa Cantalapiedra
- Runner-up: Manuel Carrasco
- Location: Gestmusic studios Sant Just Desvern, (Barcelona)

Release
- Original network: La Primera
- Original release: 7 October 2002 – 27 January 2003

Series chronology
- ← Previous; Series 1 Next → Series 3

The second series of Operación Triunfo, also known as Operación Triunfo 2 or OT 2, was aired on La Primera of Televisión Española from 7 October 2002 to 27 January 2003, and was presented by Carlos Lozano.

Following its regular series, this second series was used to choose the Spanish performer and entry for the Eurovision Song Contest 2003. Ainhoa Cantalapiedra was the winner of the regular series, with Beth winning the Eurovision selection with the song "Dime".

== Staff ==
- Academy headmaster: Nina
- Academy teachers: Helen Rowson (voice techniques and English pronunciation), Manu Guix (singing), Marieta Calderón (gala choreographer), Néstor Serra (physical trainer), Àngel Llàcer (acting), María Gómez (modern dance), and Javier Castillo (choreography).
- Judges: Pilar Tabares, Pilar Zamora, and Narcís Rebollo
- Presenter: Carlos Lozano

== Contestants ==
Contestant	Age	Residence	Episode of eviction	Place finished
Ainhoa Cantalapiedra	22	Galdakao	Final Gala	Winner
Manuel Carrasco	21	Isla Cristina	Final Gala	Runner-up
Beth	20	Súria	Final Gala	3rd
Miguel Nández	24	Cádiz	Final Gala	4th
Hugo Salazar	24	Seville	Final Gala	5th
Joan Tena	25	Barcelona	Final Gala	6th
Tony Santos	21	Tenerife	Gala 13	7th
Nika	22	Torrejón de Ardoz	Gala 12	8th
Vega	23	Córdoba	Gala 11	9th
Danni Úbeda	20	Jaén	Gala 10	10th
Elena Gadel	19	Barcelona	Gala 9	11th
Tessa	20	Valencia	Gala 8	12th
Marey	18	Cádiz	Gala 7	13th
Cristie	24	Fuengirola	Gala 6	14th
Enrique Anaut	27	Navarra	Gala 5	15th
Miguel Ángel Silva	25	Ibiza	Gala 4	16th
Mai Meneses	24	Madrid	Gala 3	17th
Saray	18	Alicante	Gala 0	Not selected
Marcos Elís	26	Barcelona	Gala 0	Not selected
Jano	25	Palma de Mallorca	Gala 0	Not selected

== Galas ==
=== Results summary ===
Colour key

–	The contestant was the weekly public's favourite and was exempt for nominations
–	The contestant was up for nomination but was saved by the teachers
–	The contestant was up for nomination but was saved by the contestants
–	The contestant was nominated to leave the academy
–	The contestant was up for the eviction but was immediately saved by the public votes
–	Nominations and eviction were canceled due to an accident

	Gala 0	Gala 1	Gala 2	Gala 3	Gala 4	Gala 5	Gala 6	Gala 7	Gala 8	Gala 9	Gala 10	Gala 11	Gala 12	Gala 13	Final
Ainhoa	Saved	Nominated		Saved	Saved	Nominated	Saved	Saved	Saved	Saved	Nominated	Saved	Saved; Mark: 8.8	Finalist	Winner
Manuel	Saved	Favourite	Exempt	Favourite	Saved	Favourite	Saved	Saved	Saved	Saved	Favourite	Saved	Saved; Mark: 9.4	Finalist	Runner-up
Beth	Saved	Saved	Favourite	Saved	Saved	Saved	Saved	Saved	Saved	Saved	Saved	Saved	Saved; Mark: 9.3	Finalist	3rd Place
Nández	Saved	Saved	Exempt	Saved	Favourite	Saved	Saved	Saved	Saved	Saved	Saved	Saved	Saved; Mark: 8.9	Finalist	4th place
Hugo	Saved	Saved	Exempt	Saved	Saved	Saved	Saved	Nominated	Saved	Saved	Saved	Nominated	Saved; Mark: 8.5	Finalist	5th place
Joan	Saved	Saved	Exempt	Saved	Saved	Saved	Saved	Saved	Saved	Nominated	Saved	Saved	Nominated; Mark: 8.7	Finalist	6th place
Tony	Saved	Saved	Exempt	Nominated	Nominated	Saved	Favourite	Favourite	Favourite	Favourite	Saved	Favourite	Nominated; Mark: 8.5	Eliminated	
Nika	Saved	Saved	Exempt	Saved	Saved	Saved	Saved	Saved	Nominated	Saved	Saved	Nominated	Eliminated		
Vega	Saved	Saved	Exempt	Saved	Saved	Saved	Saved	Saved	Saved	Saved	Nominated	Eliminated			
Danni	Saved	Saved	Exempt	Saved	Saved	Saved	Nominated	Saved	Saved	Nominated	Eliminated				
Elena	Saved	Saved	Exempt	Saved	Saved	Saved	Saved	Saved	Nominated	Eliminated					
Tessa	Saved	Saved	Exempt	Saved	Saved	Saved	Saved	Nominated	Eliminated						
Marey	Saved	Saved	Exempt	Saved	Saved	Saved	Nominated	Eliminated							
Cristie	Saved	Saved	Exempt	Saved	Saved	Nominated	Eliminated								
Enrique	Saved	Saved	Exempt	Saved	Nominated	Eliminated									
Silva	Saved	Saved	Exempt	Nominated	Eliminated										
Mai	Saved	Nominated		Eliminated											
Saray	Eliminated														
Marcos	Eliminated														
Jano	Eliminated														
Up for nomination	Jano; Marcos; Saray; Silva	Ainhoa; Danni; Elena; Mai	Ainhoa; Mai	Cristie; Enrique; Silva; Tony	Elena; Enrique; Marey; Tony	Ainhoa; Cristie; Danni; Tessa	Danni; Manuel; Marey; Tessa	Elena; Hugo; Tessa; Vega	Beth; Elena; Joan; Nika	Danni; Hugo; Joan; Nika	Ainhoa; Joan; Nika; Vega	Hugo; Joan; Nández; Nika	Ainhoa; Hugo; Joan; Tony	None	Ainhoa; 32.9% to win
Saved by the teachers	None	Elena	None	Cristie	Marey	Danni	Manuel	Vega	Joan	Nika	Joan	Nández	Hugo	None	Ainhoa; 32.9% to win
Saved by the contestants	None	Danni; 6* of 14 votes to save	None	Enrique; 7 of 13 votes to save	Elena; 7 of 12 votes to save	Tessa; 6 of 11 votes to save	Tessa; 7 of 10 votes to save	Elena; 4* of 9 votes to save	Beth; 4 of 8 votes to save	Hugo; 4 of 7 votes to save	Nika; 3 of 6 votes to save	Joan; 2* of 5 votes to save	Ainhoa; 2* of 4 votes to save	None	Manuel; 24.2% to win
Saved by public vote	Silva; 33% to save	None	Eviction postponed	Ainhoa; 54.6% to save	Tony; 63.9% to save	Tony; 69% to save	Ainhoa; 62.6% to save	Danni; 65.5% to save	Hugo; 78.2% to save	Nika; 61.6% to save	Joan; 52.1% to save	Ainhoa; 69.5% to save	Hugo; 55% to save	Joan; 51.7% to save	Beth; 16.0% to win
Evicted	Saray; 30% to save	None	Eviction postponed	Mai; 45.4% to save	Silva; 36.1% to save	Enrique; 31% to save	Cristie; 37.4% to save	Marey; 34.5% to save	Tessa; 21.8% to save	Elena; 38.4% to save	Danni; 47.9% to save	Vega; 30.5% to save	Nika; 45% to save	Tony; 48.3% to save	Miguel; 13.1% to win
Evicted	Marcos; 23% to save	None	Eviction postponed	Mai; 45.4% to save	Silva; 36.1% to save	Enrique; 31% to save	Cristie; 37.4% to save	Marey; 34.5% to save	Tessa; 21.8% to save	Elena; 38.4% to save	Danni; 47.9% to save	Vega; 30.5% to save	Nika; 45% to save	Tony; 48.3% to save	Hugo; 7.8% to win
Evicted	Jano; 13% to save	None	Eviction postponed	Mai; 45.4% to save	Silva; 36.1% to save	Enrique; 31% to save	Cristie; 37.4% to save	Marey; 34.5% to save	Tessa; 21.8% to save	Elena; 38.4% to save	Danni; 47.9% to save	Vega; 30.5% to save	Nika; 45% to save	Tony; 48.3% to save	Joan; 6% to win

=== Gala 0 ===
Gala 0 – 7 October 2002
R/O	Song	Contestant	Result
1	"Pasaba por aquí" by Luis Eduardo Aute	Hugo Salazar	Saved by the jury
2	"Tú y yo" by Thalía	Nika	Saved by the jury
3	"A Dios le pido" by Juanes	Danni Úbeda	Saved by the jury
4	"What's Up?" by 4 Non Blondes	Vega	Saved by the jury
5	"Problema" by Ketama	Jano	Proposed by the jury Evicted (13%)
6	"Color esperanza" by Diego Torres	Enrique Anaut	Saved by the jury
7	"Tu boca" by Marcela Morelo	Tessa	Saved by the jury
8	"Angelito" by Carlos Baute	Miguel Ángel Silva	Proposed by the jury Saved by the public (34%)
9	"A fuego lento" by Rosana	Elena Gadel	Saved by the jury
10	"Hasta que me olvides" by Luis Miguel	Miguel Nández	Saved by the jury
11	"Remolino" by Francisco Cespedes	Manuel Carrasco	Saved by the jury
12	"Think Twice" by Céline Dion	Ainhoa	Saved by the jury
13	"Se dejaba llevar por ti" by Antonio Vega	Joan Tena	Saved by the jury
14	"Sin ti no soy nada" by Amaral	Marey	Saved by the jury
15	"Torn" by Natalie Imbruglia	Beth	Saved by the jury
16	"Suerte" by Shakira	Cristie	Saved by the jury
17	"How Do I Live" by Trisha Yearwood	Mai Meneses	Saved by the jury
18	"La cosa más bella" by Eros Ramazzotti	Marcos Elís	Proposed by the jury Evicted (23%)
19	"I Believe I Can Fly" by R. Kelly	Tony Santos	Saved by the jury
20	"Tú y yo volvemos al amor" by Mónica Naranjo	Saray	Proposed by the jury Evicted (30%)

=== Gala 1 ===
Gala 1 – 14 October 2002
R/O	Song	Contestant	Result
1	"En el jardín" by Gloria Estefan and Alejandro Fernández	Miguel Nández	Saved by the jury
1	"En el jardín" by Gloria Estefan and Alejandro Fernández	Vega	Saved by the jury
2	"Entra en mi vida" by Sin Bandera	Manuel Carrasco	Public's favourite
2	"Entra en mi vida" by Sin Bandera	Hugo Salazar	Saved by the jury
3	"Tell Him" by Céline Dion and Barbra Streisand	Marey	Saved by the jury
3	"Tell Him" by Céline Dion and Barbra Streisand	Tessa	Saved by the jury
4	"Me cuesta tanto olvidarte" by Mecano	Elena Gadel	Proposed by the jury Saved by the teachers
4	"Me cuesta tanto olvidarte" by Mecano	Mai Meneses	Proposed by the jury Nominated
5	"You Are the Sunshine of My Life" by Stevie Wonder	Enrique Anaut	Saved by the jury
5	"You Are the Sunshine of My Life" by Stevie Wonder	Tony Santos	Saved by the jury
6	"Sin miedo a nada" by Álex Ubago and Amaia Montero	Beth	Saved by the jury
6	"Sin miedo a nada" by Álex Ubago and Amaia Montero	Joan Tena	Saved by the jury
7	"Dónde van" by Diego Torres	Danni Úbeda	Proposed by the jury Saved by the contestants
7	"Dónde van" by Diego Torres	Miguel Ángel Silva	Saved by the jury
8	"One Day in Your Life" by Anastacia	Ainhoa	Proposed by the jury Nominated
8	"One Day in Your Life" by Anastacia	Cristie	Saved by the jury
8	"One Day in Your Life" by Anastacia	Nika	Saved by the jury

=== Gala 2 ===
Gala 2 – 21 October 2002
R/O	Song	Contestant	Result
Up for eviction
1	"Sacrifice" by Anouk	Ainhoa	Eviction suspended Nominated
2	"Amar haciendo el amor" by Céline Dion	Mai Meneses	Eviction suspended Nominated
Regular performances
3	"Esta tarde vi llover" by Armando Manzanero	Hugo Salazar	Nominations suspended
3	"Esta tarde vi llover" by Armando Manzanero	Tessa	Nominations suspended
4	"Fallin'" by Alicia Keys	Beth	Public's favourite
4	"Fallin'" by Alicia Keys	Elena Gadel	Nominations suspended
4	"Fallin'" by Alicia Keys	Vega	Nominations suspended
5	"Devuélveme la vida" by Antonio Orozco	Cristie	Nominations suspended
5	"Devuélveme la vida" by Antonio Orozco	Miguel Nández	Nominations suspended
6	"Quisiera ser" by Alejandro Sanz	Manuel Carrasco	Nominations suspended
7	"Llueve sobre mojado" by Fito Páez and Joaquín Sabina	Joan Tena	Nominations suspended
7	"Llueve sobre mojado" by Fito Páez and Joaquín Sabina	Danni Úbeda	Nominations suspended
8	"I'm Every Woman" by Chaka Khan	Marey	Nominations suspended
8	"I'm Every Woman" by Chaka Khan	Nika	Nominations suspended
9	"Agüita de tu boca" by Amaury Gutiérrez	Enrique Anaut	Nominations suspended
9	"Agüita de tu boca" by Amaury Gutiérrez	Miguel Ángel Silva	Nominations suspended
9	"Agüita de tu boca" by Amaury Gutiérrez	Tony Santos	Nominations suspended

=== Gala 3 ===
Gala 3 – 28 October 2002
R/O	Song	Contestant	Result
Up for eviction
1	"Un año de amor" by Luz Casal	Ainhoa	Saved by the public (54.6%) Saved by the jury
2	"Volverás" by Gloria Estefan	Mai Meneses	Evicted by the public (45.4%)
Regular performances
3	"Vivir así es morir de amor" by Camilo Sesto	Miguel Nández	Saved by the jury
3	"Vivir así es morir de amor" by Camilo Sesto	Marey	Saved by the jury
4	"Yesterday" by The Beatles	Beth	Saved by the jury
5	"Santa Lucía" by Miguel Ríos	Enrique Anaut	Proposed by the jury Saved by the contestants
5	"Santa Lucía" by Miguel Ríos	Danni Úbeda	Saved by the jury
5	"Santa Lucía" by Miguel Ríos	Joan Tena	Saved by the jury
6	"Tú me amas (sabor locura)" by Ana Belén and Ketama	Elena Gadel	Saved by the jury
6	"Tú me amas (sabor locura)" by Ana Belén and Ketama	Manuel Carrasco	Public's favourite
7	"Up Where We Belong" by Joe Cocker and Jennifer Warnes	Cristie	Proposed by the jury Saved by the teachers
7	"Up Where We Belong" by Joe Cocker and Jennifer Warnes	Tony Santos	Proposed by the jury Nominated
8	"Qué será" by José Feliciano	Hugo Salazar	Saved by the jury
8	"Qué será" by José Feliciano	Miguel Ángel Silva	Proposed by the jury Nominated
9	"Dressed for Success" by Roxette	Nika	Saved by the jury
9	"Dressed for Success" by Roxette	Tessa	Saved by the jury
9	"Dressed for Success" by Roxette	Vega	Saved by the jury

=== Gala 4 ===
Gala 4 – 6 November 2002
R/O	Song	Contestant	Result
Up for eviction
1	"Con un bolero" by Raúl	Miguel Ángel Silva	Evicted by the public (36.1%)
2	"Una canción para mamá" by Boyz II Men	Tony Santos	Saved by the public (63.9%) Proposed by the jury Nominated
Regular performances
3	"Alba" by Antonio Flores	Joan Tena	Saved by the jury
3	"Alba" by Antonio Flores	Miguel Nández	Public's favourite
4	"Proud Mary" by Creedence Clearwater Revival	Nika	Saved by the jury
4	"Proud Mary" by Creedence Clearwater Revival	Beth	Saved by the jury
5	"Si pongo corazón" by Rosana	Ainhoa	Saved by the jury
5	"Si pongo corazón" by Rosana	Vega	Saved by the jury
6	"Sinceramente tuyo" by Joan Manuel Serrat	Manuel Carrasco	Saved by the jury
7	"Dame" by Chayanne and Jennifer Lopez	Enrique Anaut	Proposed by the jury Nominated
7	"Dame" by Chayanne and Jennifer Lopez	Tessa	Saved by the jury
8	"Pájaros de barro" by Manolo García	Hugo Salazar	Saved by the jury
8	"Pájaros de barro" by Manolo García	Danni Úbeda	Saved by the jury
9	"Strong Enough" by Cher	Cristie	Saved by the jury
9	"Strong Enough" by Cher	Elena Gadel	Proposed by the jury Saved by the contestants
9	"Strong Enough" by Cher	Marey	Proposed by the jury Saved by the teachers

=== Gala 5 ===
Gala 5 – 11 November 2002
R/O	Song	Contestant	Result
Up for eviction
1	"You've Got a Friend" by Carole King	Enrique Anaut	Evicted by the public (31%)
2	"Sería fácil" by Luis Fonsi	Tony Santos	Saved by the public (69%) Saved by the jury
Regular performances
3	"You're Still the One" by Shania Twain	Vega	Saved by the jury
3	"You're Still the One" by Shania Twain	Elena Gadel	Saved by the jury
4	"Dormir contigo" by Luís Miguel	Miguel Nández	Saved by the jury
5	"Piensa en mí" by Luz Casal	Ainhoa	Proposed by the jury Nominated
5	"Piensa en mí" by Luz Casal	Beth	Saved by the jury
6	"Es por ti" by Sau	Hugo Salazar	Saved by the jury
6	"Es por ti" by Sau	Nika	Saved by the jury
7	"A todo pulmón" by Alejandro Lerner	Joan Tena	Saved by the jury
7	"A todo pulmón" by Alejandro Lerner	Danni Úbeda	Proposed by the jury Saved by the teachers
8	"No sé tú" by Armando Manzanero	Tessa	Proposed by the jury Saved by the contestants
8	"No sé tú" by Armando Manzanero	Manuel Carrasco	Public's favourite
9	"When You Believe" by Whitney Houston and Mariah Carey	Cristie	Proposed by the jury Nominated
9	"When You Believe" by Whitney Houston and Mariah Carey	Marey	Saved by the jury

=== Gala 6 ===
Gala 6 – 18 November 2002
R/O	Song	Contestant	Result
Up for eviction
1	"Little Wing" by Jimi Hendrix	Ainhoa	Saved by the public (62.6%) Saved by the jury
2	"Cai" by Niña Pastori	Cristie	Evicted by the public (37.4%)
Regular performances
3	"Hoy tengo ganas de ti" by Miguel Gallardo	Elena Gadel	Saved by the jury
3	"Hoy tengo ganas de ti" by Miguel Gallardo	Miguel Nández	Saved by the jury
4	"Loco por verte" by Manolo Tena	Manuel Carrasco	Proposed by the jury Saved by the teachers
5	"Me vuelves loco" by Armando Manzanero	Hugo Salazar	Saved by the jury
5	"Me vuelves loco" by Armando Manzanero	Vega	Saved by the jury
6	"More Than Words" by Extreme	Joan Tena	Saved by the jury
6	"More Than Words" by Extreme	Tony Santos	Public's favourite
7	"Los mejores años de nuestra vida" by Renato Zero	Marey	Proposed by the jury Nominated
7	"Los mejores años de nuestra vida" by Renato Zero	Danni Úbeda	Proposed by the jury Nominated
8	"The Love I Lost" by Harold Melvin & the Blue Notes	Beth	Saved by the jury
8	"The Love I Lost" by Harold Melvin & the Blue Notes	Nika	Saved by the jury
8	"The Love I Lost" by Harold Melvin & the Blue Notes	Tessa	Proposed by the jury Saved by the contestants

=== Gala 7 ===
Gala 7 – 25 November 2002
R/O	Song	Contestant	Result
Up for eviction
1	"Siete vidas" by Antonio Flores	Danni Úbeda	Saved by the public (65.5%) Saved by the jury
2	"My Heart Will Go On" by Céline Dion	Marey	Evicted by the public (34.5%)
Regular performances
3	"Dime" by Laura Pausini and José el Francés	Beth	Saved by the jury
3	"Dime" by Laura Pausini and José el Francés	Manuel Carrasco	Saved by the jury
3	"Dime" by Laura Pausini and José el Francés	Tessa	Proposed by the jury Nominated
4	"A gritos de esperanza" by Álex Ubago	Joan Tena	Saved by the jury
4	"A gritos de esperanza" by Álex Ubago	Vega	Proposed by the jury Saved by the teachers
5	"Fantástico amor" by Eros Ramazzotti	Tony Santos	Public's favourite
6	"Devórame otra vez" by Lalo Rodríguez	Hugo Salazar	Proposed by the jury Nominated
6	"Devórame otra vez" by Lalo Rodríguez	Elena Gadel	Proposed by the jury Saved by the contestants
7	"Cartas amarillas" by Nino Bravo	Miguel Nández	Saved by the jury
8	"Venus" by Bananarama	Ainhoa	Saved by the jury
8	"Venus" by Bananarama	Nika	Saved by the jury

=== Gala 8 ===
Gala 8 – 2 December 2002
R/O	Song	Contestant	Result
Up for eviction
1	"Sevilla" by Arturo Pareja-Obregón	Hugo Salazar	Saved by the public (78.2%) Saved by the jury
2	"Alma de blues" by Presuntos Implicados	Tessa	Evicted by the public (21.8%)
Regular performances
3	"Llevátela" by Armando Manzanero	Joan Tena	Proposed by the jury Saved by the teachers
3	"Llevátela" by Armando Manzanero	Manuel Carrasco	Saved by the jury
4	"Pa' ti no estoy" by Rosana	Danni Úbeda	Saved by the jury
4	"Pa' ti no estoy" by Rosana	Vega	Saved by the jury
5	"Reunited" by Peaches & Herb	Miguel Nández	Saved by the jury
5	"Reunited" by Peaches & Herb	Nika	Proposed by the jury Nominated
6	"Si no te hubiera conocido" by Luis Fonsi and Christina Aguilera	Tony Santos	Public's favourite
6	"Si no te hubiera conocido" by Luis Fonsi and Christina Aguilera	Beth	Proposed by the jury Saved by the contestants
7	"Think" by Aretha Franklin	Ainhoa	Saved by the jury
7	"Think" by Aretha Franklin	Elena Gadel	Proposed by the jury Nominated

=== Gala 9 ===
Gala 9 – 9 December 2002
R/O	Song	Contestant	Result
Up for eviction
1	"His Eye Is on the Sparrow" by Lauryn Hill	Elena Gadel	Evicted by the public (38.4%)
2	"Show Me Heaven" by Maria McKee	Nika	Saved by the public (61.6%) Proposed by the jury Saved by the teachers
Regular performances
3	"Baila Morena" by Zucchero	Manuel Carrasco	Saved by the jury
3	"Baila Morena" by Zucchero	Tony Santos	Public's favourite
4	"Tears in Heaven" by Eric Clapton	Joan Tena	Proposed by the jury Nominated
4	"Tears in Heaven" by Eric Clapton	Hugo Salazar	Proposed by the jury Saved by the contestants
5	"Caruso" by Lucio Dalla	Miguel Nández	Saved by the jury
5	"Caruso" by Lucio Dalla	Ainhoa	Saved by the jury
6	"De ley" by Rosario Flores	Beth	Saved by the jury
6	"De ley" by Rosario Flores	Vega	Saved by the jury
7	"Chiquilla" by Seguridad Social	Danni Úbeda	Proposed by the jury Nominated

=== Gala 10 ===
Gala 10 – 16 December 2002
R/O	Song	Contestant	Result
Up for eviction
1	"Es por ti" by Juanes	Danni Úbeda	Evicted by the public (47.9%)
2	"Todo es un misterio" by Francisco Céspedes	Joan Tena	Saved by the public (52.1%) Proposed by the jury Saved by the teachers
Regular performances
3	"Amiga mía" by Alejandro Sanz	Miguel Nández	Saved by the jury
3	"Amiga mía" by Alejandro Sanz	Manuel Carrasco	Public's favourite
4	"Total Eclipse of the Heart" by Bonnie Tyler	Beth	Saved by the jury
5	"Mujer contra mujer" by Mecano	Ainhoa	Proposed by the jury Nominated
5	"Mujer contra mujer" by Mecano	Vega	Proposed by the jury Nominated
6	"Y tú te vas" by Chayanne	Hugo Salazar	Saved by the jury
7	"Ain't No Mountain High Enough" by Marvin Gaye and Tammi Terrell	Tony Santos	Saved by the jury
7	"Ain't No Mountain High Enough" by Marvin Gaye and Tammi Terrell	Nika	Proposed by the jury Saved by the contestants

=== Gala 11 ===
Gala 11 – 6 January 2003
R/O	Song	Contestant	Result
Up for eviction
1	"Ironic" by Alanis Morissette	Ainhoa	Saved by the public (69.5%) Saved by the jury
2	"Every Breath You Take" by The Police	Vega	Evicted by the public (30.5%)
Regular performances
3	"Por debajo de la mesa" by Luis Miguel	Miguel Nández	Proposed by the jury Saved by the teachers
3	"Por debajo de la mesa" by Luis Miguel	Beth	Saved by the jury
4	"Toda la vida" by Lucio Dalla	Manuel Carrasco	Saved by the jury
5	"Échame a mi la culpa" by Albert Hammond	Joan Tena	Proposed by the jury Saved by the contestants
6	"La bámbola" by Patty Pravo	Nika	Proposed by the jury Nominated
7	"Usted se me llevó la vida" by Alexandre Pires	Tony Santos	Public's favourite
7	"Usted se me llevó la vida" by Alexandre Pires	Hugo Salazar	Proposed by the jury Nominated

=== Gala 12 ===
Gala 12 – 13 January 2003
R/O	Song	Contestant	Result
Up for eviction
1	"La incondicional" by Luis Miguel	Hugo Salazar	Saved by the public (55%) Proposed by the jury Saved by the teachers 4th finalist
2	"Livin' on a Prayer" by Bon Jovi	Nika	Evicted by the public (45%)
Regular performances
3	"Corazón partío" by Alejandro Sanz	Manuel Carrasco	Public's favourite 1st finalist
4	"No hago otra cosa que pensar en ti" by Joan Manuel Serrat	Joan Tena	Proposed by the jury Nominated
5	"En ausencia de ti" by Laura Pausini	Beth	Saved by the jury 2nd finalist
6	"Eloise" by Barry Ryan	Miguel Nández	Saved by the jury 3rd finalist
7	"Si tú eres mi hombre y yo tu mujer" by Jennifer Rush	Ainhoa	Proposed by the jury Saved by the contestants 5th finalist
8	"I Just Called to Say I Love You" by Stevie Wonder	Tony Santos	Proposed by the jury Nominated

=== Gala 13 ===
Gala 13 – 20 January 2003
R/O	Song	Contestant	Result
Up for eviction
1	"Cecilia" by Fito Páez	Joan Tena	Saved by the public (51.7%) 6th finalist
2	"I'll Be There" by The Jackson Five	Tony Santos	Evicted by the public (48.3%)
Regular performances
3	"Cuando vuelva a tu lado" by Luis Miguel	Manuel Carrasco	Finalist
4	"Sobreviviré" by Mónica Naranjo	Ainhoa	Finalist
5	"No me olvides" by Diego Torres	Hugo Salazar	Finalist
6	"Stand by Me" by John Lennon	Beth	Finalist
7	"Noelia" by Nino Bravo	Miguel Nández	Finalist

Potpourri Gala 0 – 20 January 2003
R/O	Song	Contestant
1	"Think Twice" by Céline Dion	Ainhoa
2	"Torn" by Natalie Imbruglia	Beth
3	"Remolino" by Francisco Cespedes	Manuel Carrasco
4	"Hasta que me olvides" by Luis Miguel	Miguel Nández
5	"Pasaba por aquí" by Luis Eduardo Aute	Hugo Salazar
6	"Se dejaba llevar por ti" by Antonio Vega	Joan Tena

=== Final Gala ===
Final Gala – 27 January 2003
R/O	Song	Contestant	Result
1	"Usted" by Luis Miguel	Hugo Salazar	5th place (7.8%)
2	"Para tocar el cielo" by Tontxu	Joan Tena	6th place (6.0%)
3	"Imagine" by John Lennon	Beth	3rd place (16.0%)
4	"Por ti yo iré" by Diego Torres	Manuel Carrasco	Runner-up (24.2%)
5	"Sábado por la tarde" by Claudio Baglioni	Miguel Nández	4th place (13.1%)
6	"(You Make Me Feel Like) A Natural Woman" by Carole King	Ainhoa	Winner (32.9%)

== Ratings ==
Operación Triunfo 2 – Ratings
Gala	Date	Avg. viewers (millions)	Avg. share
Gala 0	7 October 2002	5.648	39.1%
Gala 1	14 October 2002	5.812	40.2%
Gala 2	21 October 2002	5.633	33.1%
Gala 3	28 October 2002	5.163	37.1%
Gala 4	6 November 2002	5.592	32.6%
Gala 5	11 November 2002	5.291	34.5%
Gala 6	18 November 2002	5.443	35.9%
Gala 7	25 November 2002	5.485	36.6%
Gala 8	2 December 2002	5.267	34.9%
Gala 9	9 December 2002	5.370	34.2%
Gala 10	16 December 2002	5.168	33.2%
Gala 11	6 January 2003	5.168	32.7%
Gala 12	13 January 2003	5.481	36.7%
Gala 13	20 January 2003	5.625	35.1%
Final Gala	27 January 2003	7.764	47.9%
