= Dime (Beth song) =

2003 song by Beth

Single by Beth

from the album Otra realidad
- Released: 13 April 2003
- Genre: Latin pop; dance-pop
- Label: Vale Music
- Composer: Jesús María Pérez
- Lyricist: Amaya Martínez

Beth singles chronology
"Dime" (2003)	"Parando el tiempo" (2003)

Eurovision Song Contest 2003 entry
- Country: Spain
- Artist: Elisabeth Rodergas
- As: Beth
- Language: Spanish
- Composer: Jesús María Pérez
- Lyricist: Amaya Martínez

Finals performance
- Final result: 8th
- Final points: 81

Entry chronology
- ◄ "Europe's Living a Celebration" (2002)
- "Para llenarme de ti" (2004) ►

Official performance video
- "Dime" on YouTube

"Dime" (Spanish pronunciation: [ˈdime]; "Tell me") is a song recorded by Spanish singer Beth, with music composed by Jesús María Pérez and lyrics written by Amaya Martínez. It represented Spain at the Eurovision Song Contest 2003, placing eighth.

== Background ==
=== Conception ===
"Dime" was composed by Jesús María Pérez with lyrics by Amaya Martínez.

=== Eurovision ===
Between 10 and 17 February 2003, Televisión Española (TVE) produced a national final to select its song and performer for the 48th edition of the Eurovision Song Contest in which the top three finishers –Ainhoa, Manuel Carrasco, and Beth– from the second season of Operación Triunfo competed with three songs each. "Dime" won the competition so it became the Spanish entry, and Beth the performer, for Eurovision. The final version of the song was released on 13 April 2003 and was included in Beth's first studio album Otra realidad released on 23 April 2003. The promotional video of the song was filmed in Barcelona on location in Modernisme landmarks by architect Antoni Gaudí.

On 24 May 2003, the Eurovision Song Contest was held in the Skonto Hall in Riga hosted by Latvian Television (LTV) and broadcast live throughout the continent. Beth performed "Dime" twelfth on the evening, following Russia's "Ne Ver', Ne Boysia" by t.A.T.u., and preceding Israel's "Milim La'ahava" by Lior Narkis. At the close of voting, the song had received 81 points, placing eighth in a field of twenty-six. It was succeeded as Spanish entry at the 2004 contest by "Para llenarme de ti" by Ramón.

During the Eurovision competition, "Dime" won the Fan Award at the Marcel Bezençon Awards.

=== Aftermath ===
Despite the success that "Dime" had, Beth soon removed it from her repertoire since she did not like it and did not sing it again for twenty years. It was not until 25 March 2023 at the BCN Eurovisión Party held at the Sant Jordi Club in Barcelona, that she sang it again in public for its 20th anniversary. On 9 May 2023, RTVE Play released a documentary feature titled Dime. Historia de una canción recounting the story of the song and all the preparations for this performance.

== Charts ==
Chart (2003)	Peak position
Spain (Promusicae)	1

== Legacy ==
Finnish singer Eini released a Finnish-language version of the song titled "Kerro mulle". Russian singer Varvara released a Russian-language version of the song titled "Veter i zvezda". Israeli singer Maya Buskila covered the song in a Hebrew version titled "בלעדיך".

=== Impersonations ===
- In the sixteenth episode of the sixth season of Tu cara me suena aired on 2 February 2018 on Antena 3, singer Lucía Gil impersonated Beth singing "Dime" replicating her performance at Eurovision.
