= Palau de la Música Catalana (album) =

Live album by Beth
- Released: 2004
- Recorded: 2004
- Genre: Pop

Beth chronology
Otra Realidad (2003)	Palau de la Música Catalana (2004)	My Own Way Home (2006)

Palau de la Música Catalana is an album recorded during a live concert in the Palau de la Música Catalana by Beth, designed by Lluís Domènech i Montaner, and released as a 2-CD album.

== Track listing ==
1. Cabalgando
2. Strength, Courage & Wisdom
3. Hoy
4. Drive
5. Otra realidad
6. Walk Away
7. Vuelvo a por ti
8. Head Over Feet
9. Lately
10. La luz
11. Stay (Wasting Time)
12. No woman no cry
13. Parando el tiempo
14. Message in a Bottle
15. Roxanne
16. Every Breath You Take
17. Eclipse
18. Eleanor Rigby
19. Pol petit
20. Estás
21. Boig per tu
