= Rain on Me =

Rain on Me may refer to:

- "Rain on Me" (Ashanti song)
- "Rain on Me" (Lady Gaga and Ariana Grande song)
- "Rain on Me", a song by Atban Klann from Grass Roots
- "Rain on Me", a song by Beth from My Own Way Home
- "Rain on Me", a song by Byron Cage from An Invitation to Worship
- "Rain on Me", a song by Cheryl Cole from 3 Words
- "Rain on Me", a song by Corey Hart from Bang!
- "Rain on Me", a song by Cyndi Lauper from Bring Ya to the Brink
- "Rain on Me", a song by The Dawn from Beyond the Bend
- "Rain on Me", a song by Electrafixion from Burned
- "Rain on Me", a song by Gina Green
- "Rain on Me", a song by Glenn Hughes from The Way It Is
- "Rain on Me", a song by Jane Wiedlin from Tangled
- "Rain on Me", a song by Joji
- "Rain on Me", a song by Poster Children from Flower Plower
- "Rain on Me", a song by Takayoshi Ohmura from Emotions in Motion
- "Rain on Me", a song by Tamia from Tamia
- "Blood to Water (Rain on Me)", a song by Swallow

== See also ==
- "Why Does It Always Rain on Me?", a song by Travis
- "Raining on Me", a song by Gretchen Wilson from All Jacked Up
- "Rain Over Me", a song by Pitbull featuring Marc Anthony
- Love, Reign o'er Me, a song by The Who
