= Cristie =

Spanish singer and musician

- Born: Cristina Sánchez Ruiz; 31 May 1981 (age 44); Fuengirola (Málaga), Spain
- Genres: Pop; R&B; flamenco
- Occupations: singer, songwriter, dancer
- Instrument: Vocals
- Years active: 2005–present
- Labels: O'Clock Music (2003), Major (2011), Independent (present)
- Website: web.archive.org/web/20080919101811/http://www.cristiemusic.es/

Cristina Sánchez Ruiz (born 31 May 1978), known professionally as Cristie, is a Spanish R&B, Pop and flamenco singer.

Since a very early age she was involved in music. In October 2002 she became one of the official contestants of the second series of the Spanish TV show Operación Triunfo. Years later she also took part on La Voz. In January 2023 it was announced her appearance on the music TV show Tierra de talento.

She has released two albums as solo artist.

== Early life ==
Cristina Sanchez was born on 31 May 1978 in Fuengirola (Málaga), where she was raised by her father along her two brothers. When she was 16, she started pursuing her music career. She formed a music band with some friends and they played in different bars and pubs of her home town.

== Career ==
Her first contact with the music industry was in as part of a flamenco band called Cheli 3, where they experimented mixing flamenco, gospel and funk.

Later on she joined Caste Huarochiri, where she became deeply involved in flamenco and dance. With Los Activos, Cristie took part in some of the most prominent festivals in Spain including Espárrago Rock, Festimad, The Festival of Autumn of Madrid, and The Sea of Music. She also performed in other countries including the Expo 2000 in Hannover, the Popkomm (Germany) and the theater Ouro Verde in São Paulo, Brazil. In 2002, Cristie spent seven months acting at the Blue Note Tokyo.

Back in Spain, José María Elegant (a prestigious classical flamenco guitarist) invited Cristie to join La Maestranza and to perform during the Bienal de Flamenco in (Seville). That same month, Cristie took part on the castings for the second edition of Operación Triunfo on RTVE. She became one of the chosen participants and she joined the Academy of Artists.

=== 2002: Operación Triunfo and No quiero sufrir ===
Cristie was on the live television shows for six weeks. In one of the shows she collaborated on a duet with Antonio Orozco and his song Devuélveme la vida. That performance became one of the highlights of that season live shows.

After that, all contestants recorded and released a single. Those artists whose single reached the goal of 200,000 sold copies sold would sign a record deal.

Cristie's single, No quiero sufrir was very well received by fans and it got good reviews by the critics, but it only reached 76,000 copies, missing the goal. However, she signed a contract with O'Clock Music to release her first album.

=== 2003: Puro teatro ===
She started to work again with José María Elegant and there sertulst was the release of her debut album as a soloist: Puro teatro. The album was recorded between Madrid and Barcelona and produced by Sergio Castillo and Nacho Lesko. It included different styles of music, mostly flamenco, but with a flavour of R&B, Pop music and Funky. "Puro Theatro" is the title track; its name is after a song of the great Puerto Rican musician and composer Catalino Curet Alonso.

The specialized critic described Puro teatro as Urban-Flamenco or New Flamenco/Nuevo Flamenco. They emphasized the song called "Tonight" produced by Noel Pastor and Dioni Gómez. Pedro Javier Hermosilla and Mayan Juan collaborated on the track Soleá, dedicated to her hometown, Fuengirola. Noel Pastor and Dioni Gómez (who had previously worked with artists such as Tony Santos, Tony Aguilar and Austin) produced songs such as Cambiar and Tonight.

First single was "Pal Infierno", a flamenco fusion of R&B and soul.

=== 2008 - 2015: Con la suerte en los tacones and other projects ===
Her second music album was Con la suerte en los tacones, a fourteen tracks album (five of them written by Cristie). The style was described as fresh. She combined genres such as Soul, R&B, Salsa, Funky, Ballad, and flamenco.

In Cristie's own words with this new album I want to express myself as I am, without feeling pressured to be who I'm not.

The first single was Marbella and it videoclip was shorted in one of the most luxurious beaches of that city, the Ocean Club, which was turned into a massive filming set.

She collaborated with the also Spanish singer Pablo López, who was her pianist and back vocals on her live shows during a period of time .

Due to personal reasons she took a hiatus on her music career.

Between 2014 and 2015, Cristie joined the Orquesta Olympus and, in 2016, Nueva Alaska in Zaragoza. One year later, in 2017, she joined Kubo Project.

=== 2020: La Voz Spain ===
She decided to take part on the 2020 edition of The Voice in Spain, where she was praised by Pablo López (formerly Cristie's pianist and back vocals), Antonio Orozco, Alejandro Sanz and Laura Pausini. She was on the show during eleven weeks as part of Pausini's team.

=== 2023: Tierra de Talento ===
Her live audition on this format of Canal Sur television (Spain) was a real success as the four coaches pressing their star buttons and praising her performance of Aretha Franklin's Natural Woman.

== Discography ==
=== Albums ===
Year	Title	Details	Label
2004	Puro teatro	Release date: 6 February; Format: CD, Digital, streaming	O'clock Music (#35 Afyve).
2006	Con la suerte en los tacones	Release date: Summer; Format: CD, Digital, streaming	Independent

=== Singles ===
Spanish charts: Lista Afyve, Los 40 Principales.

Year	Song	Album
2002	No quiero sufrir	Single
2004	Pal infierno	Puro teatro
2004	Ámame	Puro teatro
2005	Ámame (remix)	Puro teatro
2006	Marbella	Con la suerte en los tacones
2006	Apunta mi teléfono	Con la suerte en los tacones
2022	Como una flor	Single

=== Collaborations ===
Year	Song	Role	Album
2003	No te dejaré jamás (Tony Santos ft. Cristie)	Dancer	Alma negra

== Filmography ==
=== Videoclips ===
- 2002: No quiero sufrir
- 2003: Sigo mi camino (with Tony Santos)
- 2005: Ámame (remix) (with Cristie & Band)
- 2005: Camino de Belén (with Lidia Reyes)
- 2006: Marbella
- 2006: Apunta mi teléfono
- 2022: Como una flor

=== Television ===
- 2002–2003: "Operación Triunfo 2" (TVE)
- 2005: TNT (guest,

Telecinco)

- 2003-2004 "Crónicas Marcianas"
- 2020: La Voz (Antena 3)
- 2023: Tierra de talento (Canal Sur)

=== Films ===
- 2003: Gira Generación OT (DVD)
- 2004: Cristie en Concierto (DVD)

== Curious Facts ==
- Cristie's cousins, Anabel Conde (2º finalist on the Eurovision Song Contest 1995) and Cristina Conde (member of Grupo la fiesta) are also artists.
- Her song Se que estás is dedicated to her late mother.
- Her life is divided between Casares and Fuengirola.
- She is interested in healthy life-style.
