= Espárrago =

Espárrago and/or Esparrago may refer to:

- Víctor Espárrago (born 1944), Uruguayan football coach
- Espárrago Rock festival, Grenada, Spain

== See also ==
- espárragos - asparagus
- Esparragosa de Lares, Spain
- Esparragosa de la Serena, Spain
