= Santaflow =

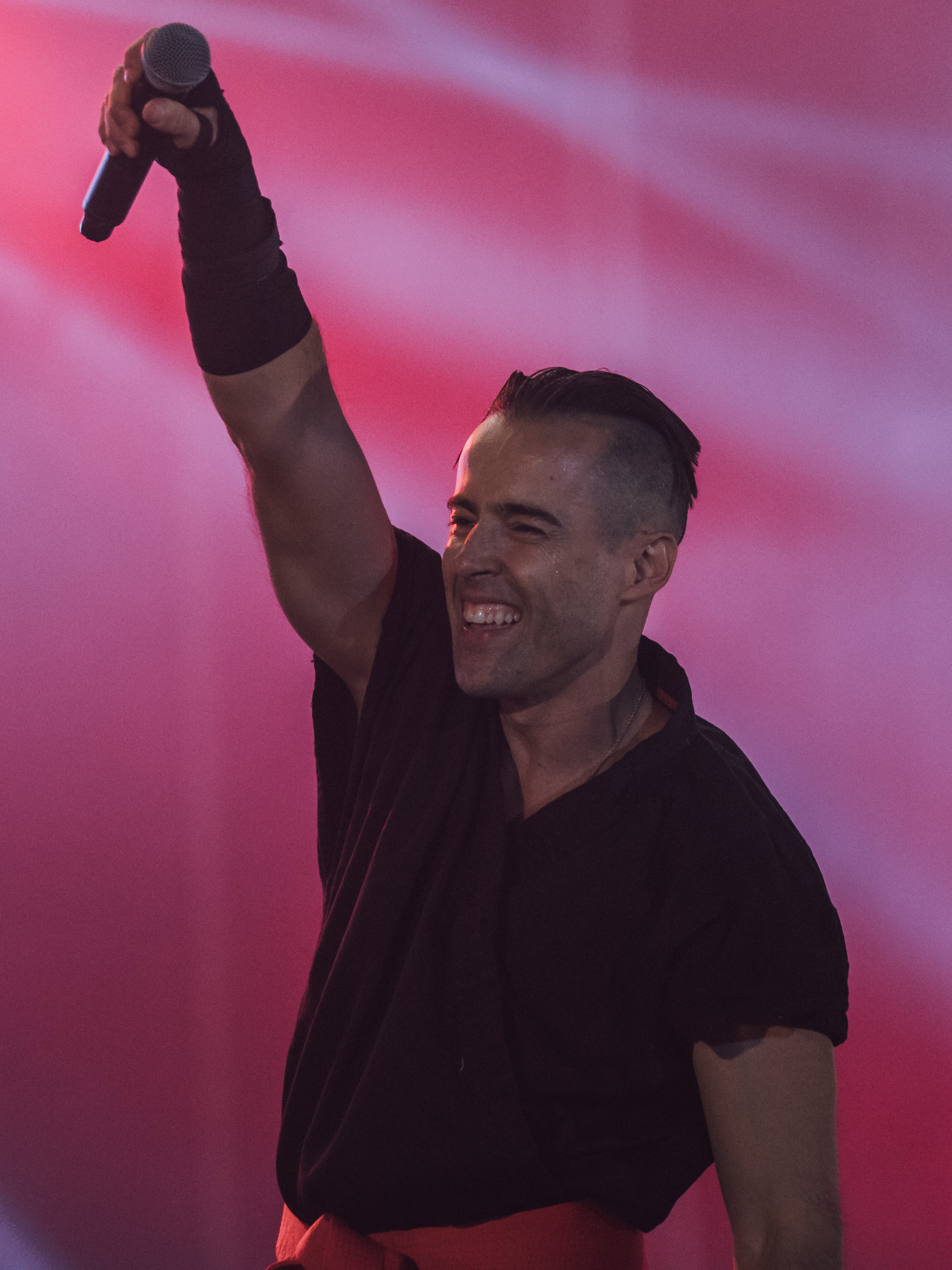
- Santaflow in 2022

Background information
- Born: Iván Santos Ortiz; 19 July 1979 (age 47); Algete, Madrid, Spain
- Genres: Rap; rock; R&B

Iván Santos Ortiz (born July 19, 1979), known artistically as Santaflow, is a Spanish singer, rapper, composer, and music producer. His artistic career has been characterized by the incorporation of rock, pop and metal influences in his musical works, integrating instruments and rhythmic structures of these genres to his hip-hop music productions.

He gained fame with the album “Desterrados”, released in 2001 with El Chulo del Megane. Since then, he has carved out a solo career, founding the independent record labels Más Sabor Estudios and Magnos Enterprise.

== Career ==
Santaflow began his music career in 1998. His first compositions were created using basic tools, developing a distinctive style marked by the execution of double times and the incorporation of rock and pop influences.

In 2000, together with El Chulo del Megane, he formed the duo “Desterrados”. In October 2001, they released their homonymous album under the label Mazo Records, with Santaflow in charge of production and mixing. After the dissolution of “Desterrados”, Santaflow embarked on his solo career. In 2003, he signed with Universal Music, which allowed him to expand his reach in the music industry.

In addition to his solo career, after the end of his contract with Universal Music, Santaflow has collaborated with various artists, such as Porta, Norykko, Eneyser, Tony Santos, Don Aitor, etc. Throughout his career, he has proven to be a multifaceted artist, performing as a composer, producer, lyricist, and singer; founded record labels such as Más Sabor Estudios and Magnos Enterprise, contributing to the development and promotion of new talents in the genre.
