= Sex Museum (band) =

Spanish rock band

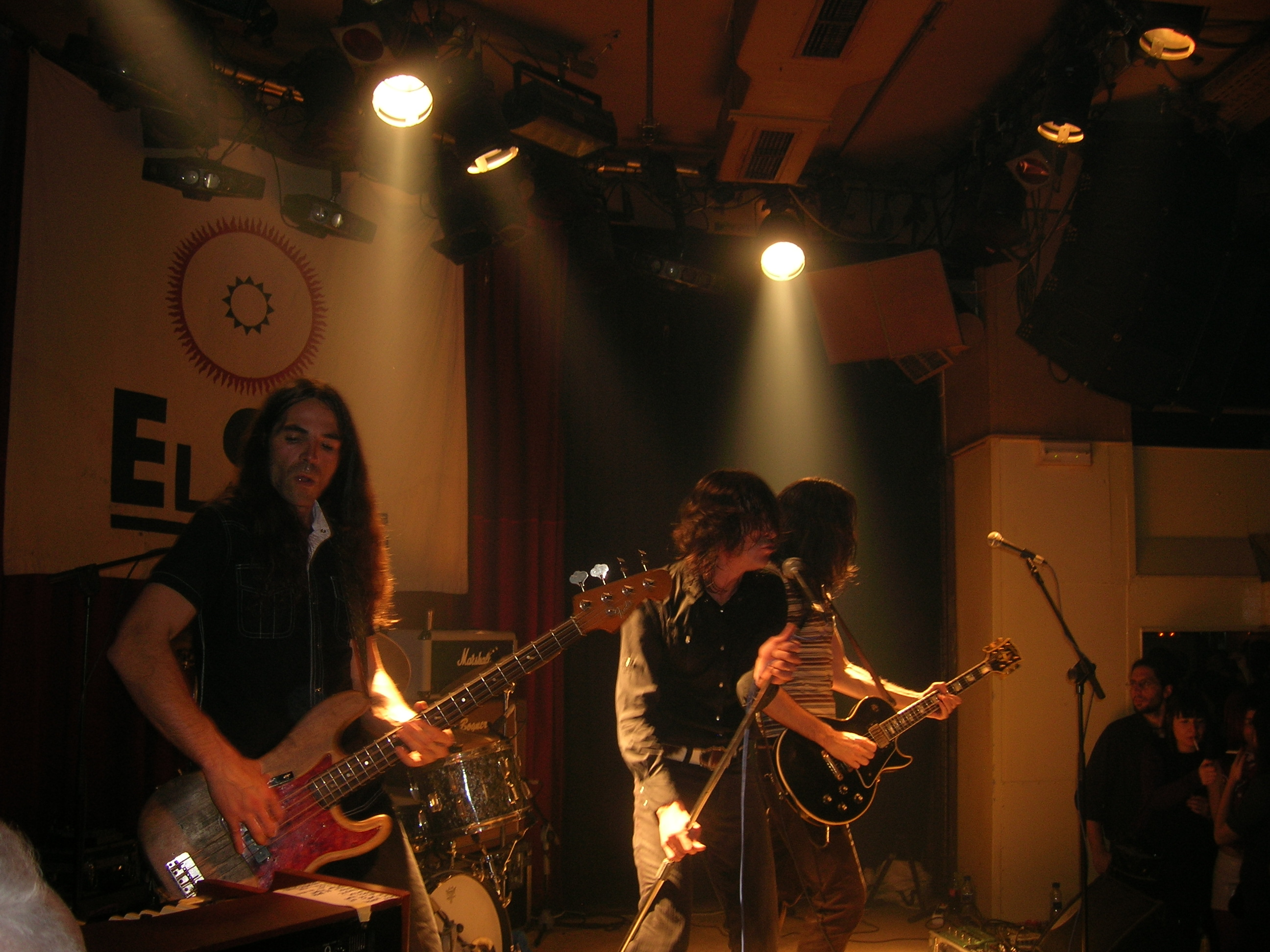

Background information
- Origin: Madrid, Spain
- Genres: Hard rock; psychedelic rock; pop; beat music; garage rock
- Years active: 1985–present
- Labels: Locomotive Music
- Members: Miguel Pardo (Vocals); Fernando Pardo (Guitar, vocals); Marta Ruiz (Organ); Javier „Vacas“ (Bass guitar); Roberto Lozano „Loza“ (Drums)
- Past members: José Lanot (1986–1987); José Luis Hernández, José Bruno, „El Niño“ (1986–1988, 1991–1993); Pepe Ríos (1988–1990); Germán (1990–1991); Kiki Tornado (1993–2000)

Sex Museum is a Spanish rock band from Madrid, formed in 1985.

== Band history ==
Originally the band began among the mod scene of Madrid playing rock music. Their first published material is highly influenced by a plethora of genres, for instance soul and R&B as well as several rock genres such as garage and psychedelic. Later on, their music increasingly adopted a more hard rock sound characteristic of the 70s. Through a number of concerts in their homeland and tours through many European countries, they gained a solid underground following not only in Spain but also Germany and Switzerland. They played at several Spanish music festivals like Esparrago Rock, Festimad and Viña Rock as well as international events such as the Beat-O-Mania in Munich, where the band co-lined with acts like Metallica, Sepultura, Backyard Babies, Sonic Youth and Extremoduro among others. 1994 they were chosen as the opening act for the Spanish tour of Deep Purple. The band has been active for 33 years, having performed thousands of live shows, in addition to releasing 12 studio albums, and many singles. Their latest album Musseexum was released in 2018.

== Discography ==
=== Albums ===
- Fuzz Face (Fidias, 87), LP. (Animal, Re-recording 1992)
- Sex Museum vs Los Macana, (Romilar D, 1988), Mini-LP. (Emi Odeon, Re-recording on CD 1993)
- Independence, (Romilar D, 1989), LP and CD. CD inkl. extra tracks. (Emi Odeon, Re-recording 1993)
- Nature's Way (Fábrica Magnética, 1991), LP
- Thee Fabulous & Furry Sex Museum (Animal, 1992), double-LP, CD
- Sparks (Roto Records, 1994), LP and CD. (Locomotive Music, Re-recording on CD 2000)
- Sum (Roto Records, 1995), LP and CD. CD inkl. extra tracks from "The Covers EP". (Locomotive Music, Re-recording auf CD 2000)
- The Covers EP (Roto Records, 1995). 7". together with Sum
- Sonic (Locomotive Music, 2000), CD
- SpeedKings (Locomotive Music, 2001), CD
- Fly by Night (Locomotive Music, 2004), double CD (live), recorded in "Sala Caracol" Madrid October 10, 2003
- Fly by Night (Locomotive Music, 2004), DVD (live), with uncut concert material (3 additional songs)
- United (Locomotive Music, 2006), CD
- Fifteen Hits That Never Where (Locomotive Music 2009), CD
- Again & Again (Tritone, 2011), CD/LP
- Big City Lights (Legacy 2014), CD/LP
- Musseexum (El Segell Del Primavera, 2018), CD/LP

=== Singles ===
- "Ya es tarde" / "Sexual beast" (Fidias, 1987). 7"
- "Get lost" / "Free living" (Romilar D, 1989). 7"
- "I'm moving" / "Last last" (Romilar D, 89). 7"
- "Two sisters" / "Liar" (Fábrica Magnética, 1991). 7"
- "Fabulous furry" / "I'm so glad" (Animal, 1992). 7"
- "P.V.C." / "Brave Ulyses goes funky" (Locomotive Music, 2000) single with Making-of (VHS) of the album "Sonic"
- "Whole lotta Rosie" (Locomotive Music, 2004). single with AC/DC covers
- "Two sisters (live)" / "Lets go out (live)" (Locomotive Music, 2004), single
- "United" (Locomotive Music, 2006), single
- "Circles in the salt" (Tritone, 2014), single

=== Compilation appearances ===
- "Drugged Personality" in Battle Of Garages Vol.IV (Voxx U.S.A., 1986)
- "You" in The Munster Dance Hall Favorites Vol. 1 (Munster, 1987)
- "Sweet home" in Modern Times (Unicorn Records England, 1987)
- "Where I Belong" in Kaleidoscopic Vibrations (Kaleidoscopic Direct, 1991)
- "Hey Conductor" in Hipnosis (Ansia de Color, 1991)
- "Dance" in Morir con las botas puestas. Homenaje a Motörhead (El Diablo, 2005). Spanish tribute to Motörhead
- "Don't believe a word" in Phil Lynnot Ha Vuelto a la Ciudad. El Rock Rinde Tributo a Thin Lizzy (Animal, 2005). Tribute to Thin Lizzy

== Sources ==
This article is translated from the German Wikipedia article of November 5, 2007
