= Manuel Carrasco (singer) =

Spanish singer (born 1981)

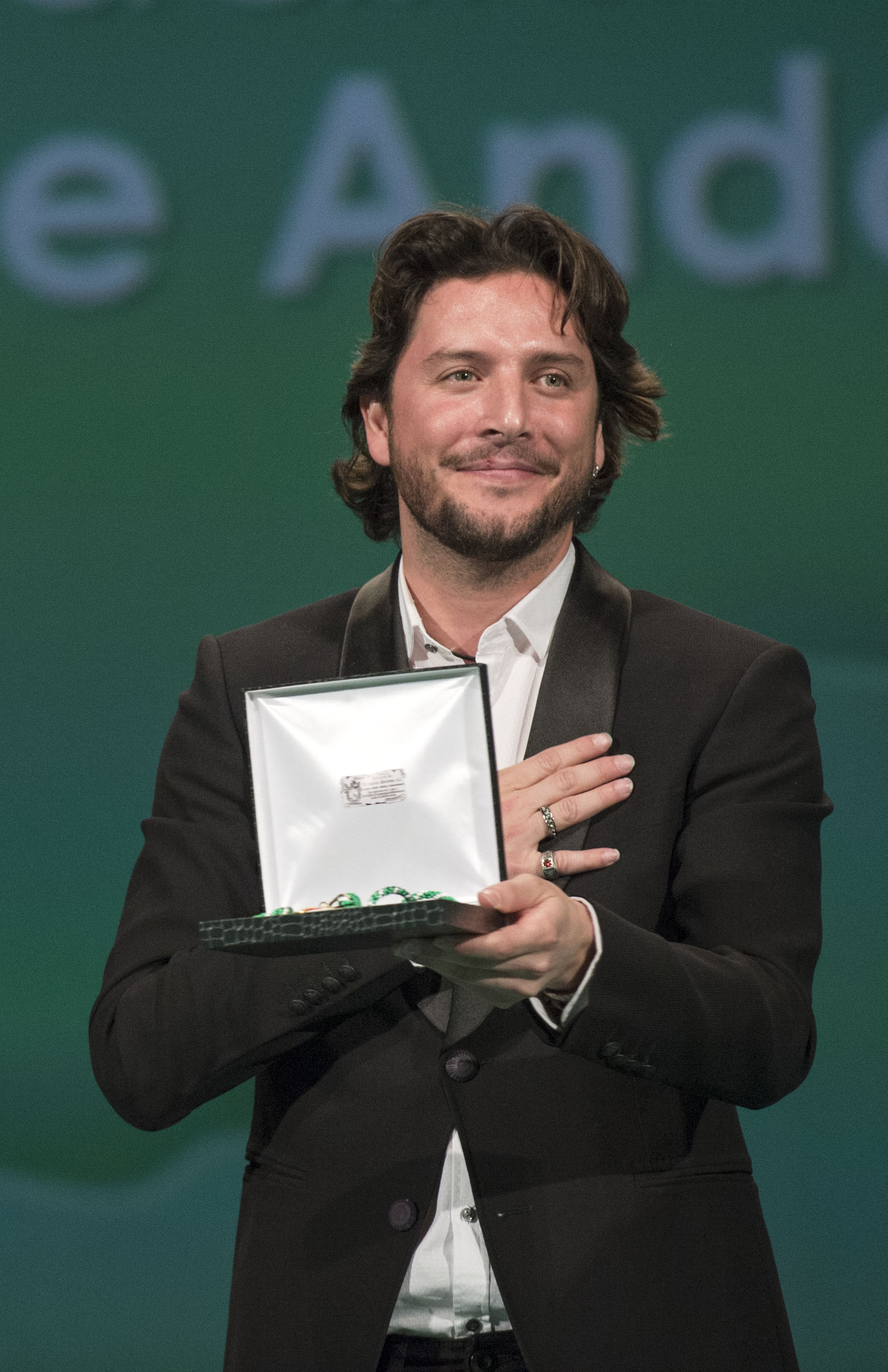
- Carrasco in 2016

Background information
- Born: Manuel Carrasco Galloso; January 15, 1981 (age 45); Isla Cristina (Huelva), Andalusia, Spain
- Occupation: Singer

Manuel Carrasco Galloso (born January 15, 1981) is a Spanish-Romani (gitano) pop singer from Isla Cristina (Huelva), Spain. He rose to fame during his participation in the second edition of the reality talent competition Operación Triunfo, where he finished second. He has gone on to record four studio albums, including his debut album, Quiéreme, which sold more than 200,000 records.

== Early life ==
Manuel Carrasco was born on January 15, 1981, in Isla Cristina, a seaside town in Huelva, Spain. Son of José Carrasco and María Galloso, he is the fourth of five siblings. From a very young age, he worked as a painter with his brothers, while he rehearsed and performed with a carnival group from his town. He joined the group when he was 13 and led it at age 16.

== Operación Triunfo ==
At 22, he tried out for the second edition of the Spanish interactive reality TV show Operación Triunfo (Spain's version of Fame Academy or Star Academy) where he finished second. The winner of that edition of OT was Ainhoa Cantalapiedra. As one of the top three contestants of the edition, Carrasco bid to represent Spain in the Eurovision Song Contest 2002, but the chance to represent Spain was won by Beth.

== Recording career ==
His first album, Quiéreme was released a month after the show's end in 2003. The album was produced by Miguel A. "Capi" Arenas and included four songs written by Carrasco himself. His first album sold more than 200,000 copies. The Quiéreme concert tour performed in 39 cities throughout Spain.

While recording his second album, Carrasco was offered the chance to participate in the Latin American music festival, "II Festival Mundial de Canción," in Puerto Rico. After competing against 22 singers from countries around the world, Carrasco won the competition with his self-composed song titled "Dibujar Tu Olvido.”

In October 2004, he released his second album, Manuel Carrasco. It was produced by Jordi Armengol, Jordi Cristau and Carrasco himself. All of the 13 songs (lyrics and music) were composed by Carrasco. He sold more than 100,000 albums and performed in 80 cities in the tour for his second album, including Ceuta, the Balearic Islands and the Canary Islands. Throughout the tour, Carrasco was accompanied on stage by renowned musicians, including Jordi Armengol (electric guitar and artistic direction), Jordi Cristau (keyboards), Jordi Portaz (bass), Eduardo Cortés (Spanish guitar), Carlos Martín (percussion) and David Simó (drums).

After spending more than a year recording in studios in the United States (New York City) and Spain (Girona), Manuel Carrasco released his third album, Tercera Parada, on September 5, 2006, with 13 self-composed songs plus an added bonus track. His first single from the album was titled "Y Ahora."

Carrasco's self-composed song, "El Beso de la Vida," was the theme song for the Venezuelan telenovela Ser Bonita No Basta.

In February 2005, Manuel Carrasco won the "Premio Dial" prize and went on to win the "Premio Musical 2005" for best new artist. He most recently received the "Premio Cadena Dial 2006" prize on February 28, 2007.

On September 16, 2008, Manuel Carrasco released his fourth studio album, Inercia. It was recorded in Buenos Aires, Argentina, and produced by Cachorro López. To promote the album, Carrasco will perform in theatres and auditoriums throughout Spain from January to March 2009. The official Inercia concert tour began in April 2009. Inercia entered the Spanish charts ("Lista 40 Principales") in its first week at number 34. As of November 29, 2008, the first single from the CD, "Sigueme," was at number 27 on the Spanish charts. The second single from the album was "Antes De Ti". The third single from the album "Que Nadie", a duet of Carrasco with Malú, became an unexpected hit that was awarded a Platinum Record certification and stayed at number one on the Spanish Singles Chart for seven weeks.

Carrasco's fifth album Habla was recorded in Milan, produced by Claudio Guidetti. It was published in January 2012 and peaked at number one in the Spanish Albums Chart; it was awarded a Platinum Record certification. The album was re-issued eleventh months after as Habla II with six new tracks. In 2013, the compilation album Confieso que he sentido was released to celebrate Carrasco's ten anniversary as a recording artist.

In 2013, Manuel Carrasco celebrated his first ten years of artistic career with the release of a new studio album, Confieso que he sentido, recorded at the Kensaltown Recordings studios in London and produced by three-time Grammy winner, Martín Terefe. An album that includes the greatest hits of the Spanish singer and that appears on the market in two formats: one normal and another with an acoustic part recorded in Tarifa. This compilation includes 22 classic songs in Carrasco's repertoire, in addition to four unreleased songs: No dejes de soñar, Aprieta, Niña de la voz quebrada y Soy afortunado.

In 2015, he served as a coach on the second season of the Spanish children's talent show La Voz Kids, alongside David Bisbal and Rosario Flores. As a coach, he won the competition with the victory of young Sevillian singer José María. During the same year, he released his single "Ya No," produced by Pablo Cebrián, which became one of his biggest hits. A month later, he released his new album, Bailar el viento, which reached number one on the Spanish charts in 2016. With a total of 200,000 copies sold, the album earned him five platinum certifications, making it the most successful album of his career. On February 28, 2016, he was awarded the Medal of Andalusia, an honor he shared with flamenco dancer Israel Galván.

== Discography ==
Studio albums

- Quiéreme (2003) 2× Platinum
- Manuel Carrasco (2004) No. 4 Spain, Gold
- Tercera Parada (2006) No. 4 Spain, Gold
- Inercia (2008) No. 5 Spain, Platinum
- Habla (2012) No. 1 Spain, Platinum
- Confieso Que He Sentido (2013) No. 1 Spain, Platinum
- Bailar el Viento (2015) No. 1 Spain, 5× Platinum
- La Cruz del Mapa (2018) No. 1 Spain, 5× Platinum
- Corazón y Flecha (2022) No.1 Spain, Platinum
- Pueblo Salvaje II (2025) No.1 Spain

Extended play

- Quiéreme (2003)
