= Super 400 =

- Origin: Troy, New York, United States
- Genres: Hard rock Blues rock
- Years active: 1996–present
- Members: Kenny Hohman; Joe Daley; Lori Friday
- Website: Official website

Super 400 is Joe Daley on drums, Kenny Hohman on guitar and vocals, and Lori Friday on electric bass. The band formed in 1996 in Troy NY, and quickly gained legendary status in the Capital District of New York. Super 400 has an electric and relentless approach to their live shows, intuitively blending a classic 60s-70s heavy rock vibe with contemporary melodic pop mastery to create something uniquely their own. Tours both in the US and abroad started a chain of bootleg recordings that have been traded and coveted around the world. Their international following sold out over 20 shows across Europe on their last tour. The love affair between the band and their hometown of Troy reached a milestone when they were honored by Mayor Harry Tutunjian’s declaration of February 25, 2006 as “Super 400 Day in Troy,” coinciding with the ten-year anniversary of the band’s first jam in a Troy warehouse loft. Super 400 recorded their most recent full-length, ‘Sweet Fist’, at legendary Ardent Studios in Memphis, TN, and followed the release with their biggest US tour to date. They’ve appeared on national television in the US and abroad, written music for top-rated shows on American television, and continue to light stages with their love and intense passion for playing. Super 400 was inducted into the Capital Region Eddies Music Hall of Fame in 2022, as well as receiving the honor of Best Rock Band.

== Discography ==
Year	Album	Record label
September 15, 2009	Sweet Fist	Electric Mombie/Rock Ridge Music/Response Records
2007	3 And The Beast	Electric Mombie
2005	Live 05	Electric Mombie
2004	Blast the Message	Electric Mombie
1998	Super 400	Island/Cacophone/Trade 2
