= Tatool =

Santiago Ruiz
- Tatool in the press room of the 27th Annual Latin Grammy Awards, 2026

Background information
- Also known as: Tatool
- Born: Santiago Ruiz; July 18, 1995 (age 31)
- Origin: Tucumán, Argentina
- Genres: Latin urban music, hip hop, R&B, electronic music
- Occupations: Record producer, songwriter, artist
- Years active: 2019–present
- Label: Auforia

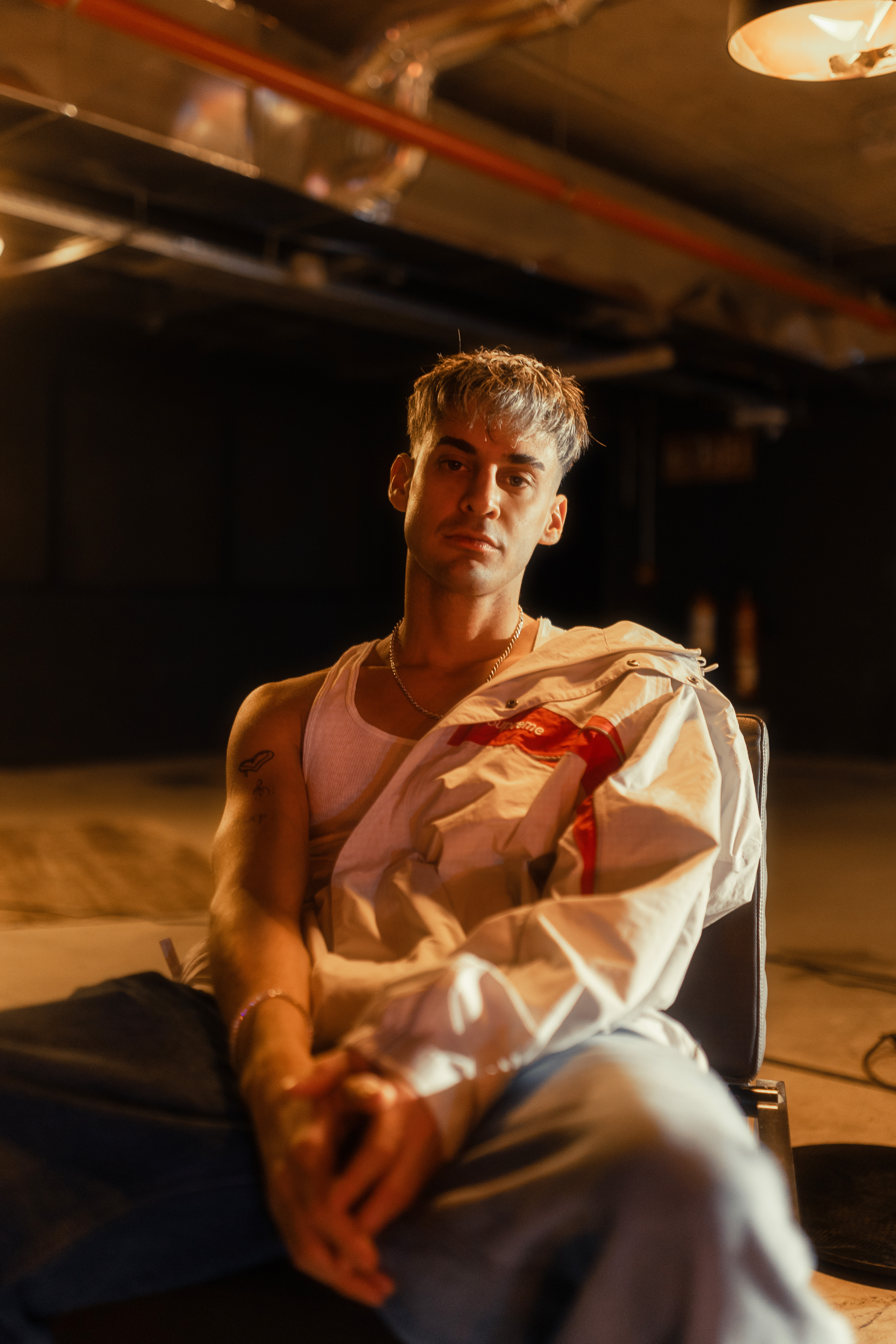
Tatool in a studio session

Santiago Ruiz (born July 18, 1995), known professionally as Tatool, is an Argentine record producer, songwriter and artist. He has worked on urban music projects with artists from Argentina and other countries. His collaborations include productions for Trueno, Nicki Nicole, Milo J, Tiago PZK, María Becerra, Eladio Carrión, Bad Gyal, Peso Pluma, Gorillaz, Sebastián Yatra, and Sean Paul.

He has received awards and nominations at the Gardel Awards, the Latin Grammy Awards, and the Grammy Awards.

In 2025, he received two Latin Grammy nominations and accumulated fourteen nominations at the Gardel Awards.

== Biography ==
=== Early life and education ===
Santiago Ruiz was born on July 18, 1995, in Tucumán, Argentina. During his adolescence, he developed an interest in music and later began producing music independently, using digital tools.

Before pursuing a career in music full-time, Ruiz earned a degree in Business Economics from Torcuato di Tella University.

== Career ==
=== Beginnings (2019–2020) ===
Tatool began his career as an independent producer, creating instrumentals and working with emerging artists. During his early years, he developed his productions from his bedroom at his parents' house, using the technical resources available to him.

In 2019, he began working at a recording studio, where he met Argentine rapper Trueno. He subsequently participated in the production of the album Atrevido (2020), one of his first projects to receive widespread exposure within the music industry.

=== Breakthrough and development (2021–present) ===
Following the release of Atrevido, Tatool continued working on urban music projects and participated in the production of albums and songs by various Argentine and international artists.

His work as a producer has focused on the overall development of recording projects, participating in different stages of music creation and in the development of the sound of the artists with whom he collaborates.

In addition to his work as a producer, he has released material as an artist and songwriter. His releases include the single "Lo que pase", recorded with Trueno.

Between 2020 and 2022, he was part of Trueno's live touring band. He subsequently focused primarily on record production.

He also founded the record label Auforia and developed Croma, an event concept associated with electronic music and audiovisual experiences.

== Style and influences ==
Tatool's productions incorporate elements of Latin urban music, hip hop, R&B, and electronic music. His work is characterized by the use of melody, synthesizers, and sound design techniques.

In his recording projects, he often works on developing a specific sonic identity for each artist, combining acoustic, electronic, and digital elements.

== Discography ==
=== As a producer ===
Tatool has participated in the production of the following albums:

- Alma — Nicki Nicole
- Naiki — Nicki Nicole
- Atrevido — Trueno
- Bien o mal — Trueno
- El último baile — Trueno
- Turrazo — Trueno
- La vida era más corta — Milo J
- La melodía — Dani Ribba
- Gotti A — Tiago PZK
- Gotti B — Tiago PZK

=== Collaborations ===
He has also participated in projects by:

- Eladio Carrión
- María Becerra
- Bad Gyal
- Peso Pluma
- Gorillaz
- Sebastián Yatra
- Sean Paul
- Cosmic Kid

== Awards and nominations ==
Year	Award	Category	Work	Result
2022	Gardel Awards	Gardel de Oro	Bien o mal — Trueno	Winner
2025	Gardel Awards	Producer of the Year	—	Nominated
2025	Latin Grammy Awards	Best Rap/Hip Hop Song	"Fresh" — Trueno	Winner
2025	Gardel Awards	Various categories	Various works	14 nominations
2025	Grammy Awards	Various categories	—	2 nominations
2026	Gardel Awards	Producer of the Year	—	Nominated
2026	Gardel Awards	Album of the Year	La vida era más corta — Milo J	Winner
2026	Gardel Awards	Record of the Year	"Niño" — Milo J	Winner
2026	Gardel Awards	Best Folk Song	"Niño" — Milo J	Winner
2026	Gardel Awards	Best Singer-Songwriter Song	"Luciérnagas" — Milo J	Winner
2026	Gardel Awards	Best Urban Collaboration	"Gil" — Milo J and Trueno	Winner
2026	Gardel Awards	Best Hip Hop/Rap Song	"Gil" — Milo J and Trueno	Winner
2026	Gardel Awards	Best Concept Album	La vida era más corta — Milo J	Winner
2026	Gardel Awards	Best Hip Hop/Rap Album	EUB Deluxe — Trueno	Winner
2026	Gardel Awards	Best Live Album	Trueno: Red Bull Symphonic — Trueno	Winner
2026	Gardel Awards	Song of the Year	"Niño" — Milo J	Winner
