= Espárrago Rock =

IndyRock festival

Espárrago Rock was an IndyRock festival held annually for 15 years, between 1989 and 2003, in the Andalucía region of southern Spain.

Acts performing at the festival included:

- Faith No More - 4 April 1998
- Bad Religion - 5 April 1998
- Dream Theater - 5 April 1998
- Garbage (band) - 12 July 2002 - Beautiful Garbage tour#Beautifulgarbage European Leg
- Iron Maiden - 11 July 2003 - Give Me Ed... 'Til I'm Dead Tour
- Deluxe (musician)
- Cristie
- Sex Museum (band)
