= Otra realidad =

Studio album by Beth
- Released: 2003
- Recorded: 2003
- Genre: Pop

Beth chronology
Otra realidad (2003)	Palau de la música catalana (2004)

Otra realidad is a studio album by Spanish singer Beth, released April 23, 2003.

== Tracks ==
1. Parando el tiempo
2. La luz (It's Summer In My Heart)
3. Estás
4. Vestida de besos
5. Quiéreme otra vez
6. Otra realidad
7. Hoy
8. No quiero aceptar (Light Years Apart)
9. Llévame contigo
10. Eclipse
11. Vuelvo por ti
12. Diario de dos
13. Un mundo perfecto
14. Dime - (bonus track)
