= Jonny Kaplan =

American singer songwriter

- Occupations: Musician, Songwriter
- Instrument: Guitar

Jonny Kaplan (born in Philadelphia, Pennsylvania) is an American singer songwriter. He resides in Los Angeles.

He records and tours with his band: Jonny Kaplan and the Lazy Stars. They have released 3 albums internationally. 1997's independently released "California Heart" was named by England's esteemed Mojo Magazine, "alternative country album of the month", successfully jump starting his career. Next came 2005's "Ride Free" and 2009's "Seasons". His fourth album, "Sparkle and Shine", is being released on Reckless Grace Music in mid-to-late 2013.

Jonny is also the lead singer/guitarist for the all-star Rolling Stones cover band, Bitch. Bitch consists of a rotating group of well-known LA-based musicians, including Rami Jaffee on keyboards (Foo Fighters and Wallflowers), Christopher Thorn and Brad Smith on guitar and bass (Blind Melon), Jessy Greene on strings (Foo Fighters, Pink), Adam McDougall on keyboards (Black Crowes) and Dave Krusen on drums (Pearl Jam).

Jonny's music is regularly in demand for placement on major network TV shows. The album, "Ride Free"'s title track was recently used on an episode of Fox TV's House. A track from "Sparkle and Shine" - "Sweet Magnolia Flower" was recently featured on the TV series Homeland. Jonny continues to record and tour, opening for the likes of Wilco, and The Black Crowes, and Ryan Adams among others.

== Discography ==
- 1999, "California Heart", Ripe Records U.S. / Glitterhouse Records, Europe; guests: Ken Stringfellow, Rami Jaffee ( The Wallflowers ) Christopher Thorn ( Blind Melon ) Miranda Lee Richards
- 2002, "Ride Free", Ripe Records U.S. / Bittersweet Recordings, Europe; guests: Doug Pettibone ( Lucinda Williams ) Rami Jaffee ( The Wallflowers )
- 2007, "Seasons", Ripe Records U.S. / Bittersweet Recordings. Europe; guests: Keith Nelson ( Buckcherry ), Jimmy Ashhurst ( Izzy Sttradlin and the Ju Ju Hounds ) Rami Jaffee ( Foo Fighters )
- 2013, "Sparkle and Shine", Reckless Grace Music, Worldwide. Guests: Rami Jaffee ( Foo Fighters, Wallflowers), Jesse Green (Foo Fighters, Pink), Brad Smith (Blind Melon), Adam MacDougall (Black Crowes), Daryl Hannah (actress).

Jonny Kaplan influences: Gram Parsons, Bob Dylan, Ryan Adams, The Black Crowes, The Rolling Stones, Neil Young, Tom Petty, Lucinda Williams, The Byrds, Grateful Dead, New Riders Of The Purple Sage, Ray La Montagne, Taj Mahal,

Jonny also plays with The Sin City All Stars.

Jonny also played with the Italian Alternative Rock Band Gunash feat.Rami Jaffee of Foo Fighters during the Italian Tour 2019.

Jonny also appeared on the soundtrack to the film "Slither" along with The Old 97's
