= Festimad =

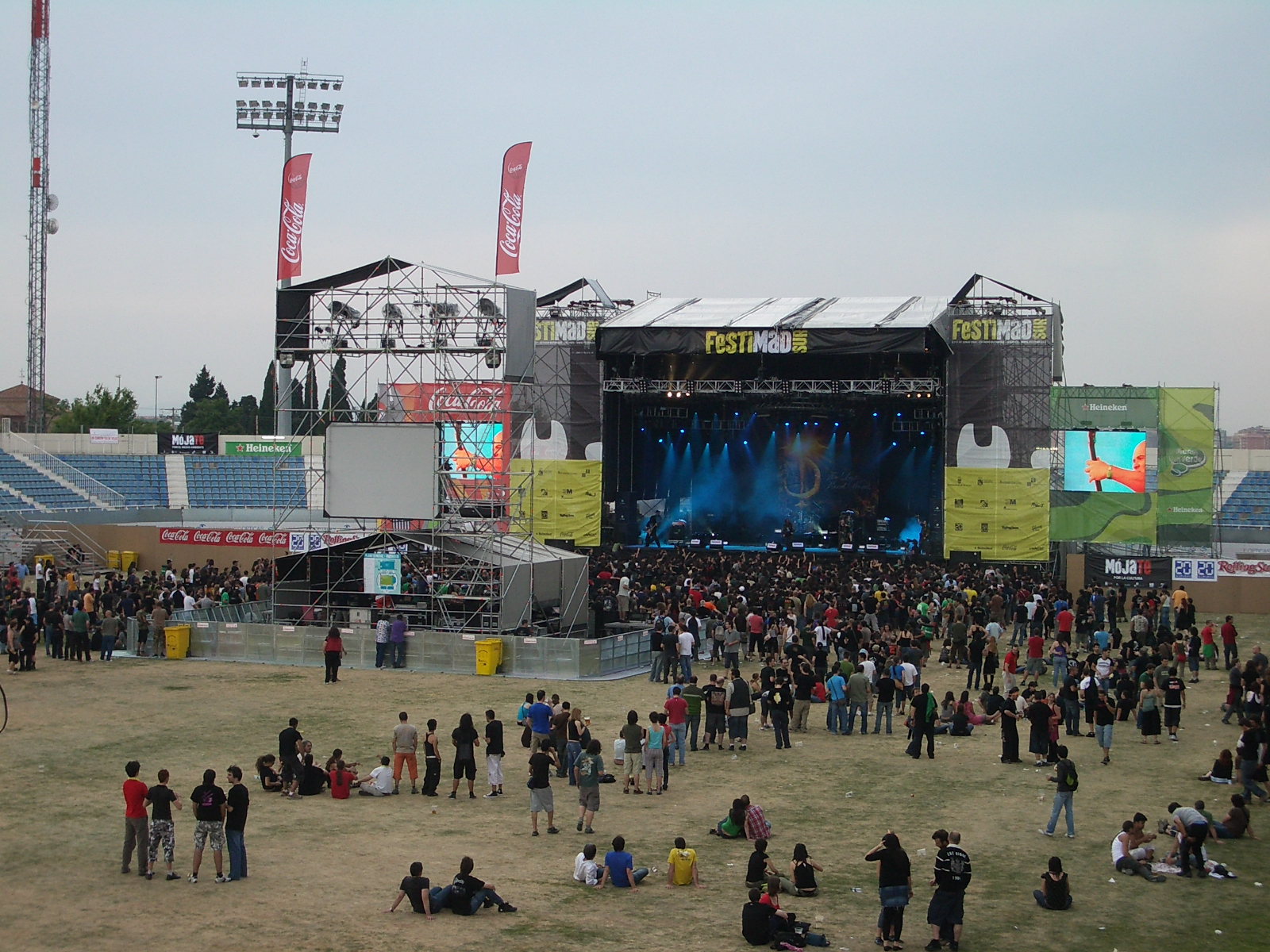
Festimad 2007

Festimad is an alternative rock festival and cultural event held yearly in Madrid, Spain since 1994, usually in the last week of May. Festimad includes several parallel cultural festivals such as Performa, Graffiti, Universimad o Cinemad, although its central event continues to be the music festival, standing alongside the Festival Internacional de Benicàssim as Spain's main rock concert.

== Festimad 2M: A New Stage ==
In 2009, Festimad's organizers abandoned the macrofestival model and returned to a format resembling its earliest editions, with concerts spread across small and medium-sized venues. Julio Muñoz, coordinator of the renamed Festimad2M, explained that organizers preferred to use existing venues rather than spend limited resources on erecting fences, providing services, and equipping a large space.
