= My Own Way Home =

Studio album by Beth
- Released: October 9, 2006 (SPN)
- Recorded: 2005 / 2006
- Genre: Pop

Beth chronology
Palau De La Música Catalana (2004)	My Own Way Home (2006)

My Own Way Home is the third album from Spanish singer Beth, released on 9 October 2006 in Spain. It was released in the UK on 11 September 2006. The disc contains ten songs (eight English tracks and two Spanish tracks).

== Track listing ==
1. Lullaby [2:29]
2. Rain On Me [3:07]
3. Deep Inside [2:57]
4. All These Things [3:57]
5. Hacerte Feliz [4:23]
6. Angel [3:47]
7. Home [3:49]
8. Sad Song [3:03]
9. Mama [4:17]
10. Strange World [3:33]
11. A Veces... (Hidden Track: "Suria") [10:21]

== Bonus ==
1. On És L'Amor (Mar De Fons Theme)

== Charts ==
Chart (2006)	Peak position
Spanish Albums (PROMUSICAE)	57
