= Beth (singer) =

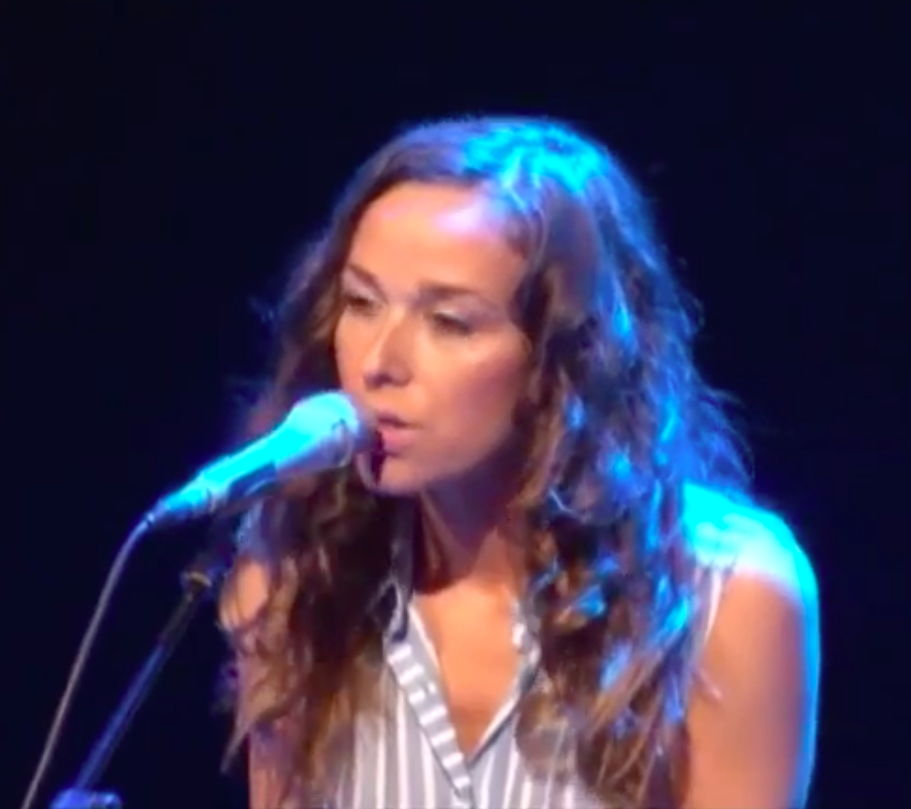

Background information
- Also known as: Beth
- Born: Elisabeth Rodergas Cols; 23 December 1981 (age 44); Súria (Barcelona), Spain
- Occupation: Singer
- Years active: 2003–present

Elisabeth Rodergas Cols, known professionally as Beth, (Spanish pronunciation: [bet]; born 23 December 1981) is a Catalan singer.

== Biography ==
Beth was born in Súria. After finishing school, she studied musical theatre in Barcelona and lived for a time in the United Kingdom, as well as participated in humanitarian missions in Africa.

In 2002, she entered the musical talent show Operación Triunfo. She finished third, but in a separate vote was selected by the audience to compete in the Eurovision Song Contest 2003. She finished eighth at Eurovision with the song "Dime" (Tell Me), which was a number one hit in Spain; that edition of the contest was the most watched TV program in Spain in 2003. She was referred by British commentator Terry Wogan as Kylie Minogue in dreadlocks, which was played on by many British tabloids.

Beth released her first studio album entitled Otra realidad, which included "Dime", on 23 April 2003 with Vale Music. It peaked at number one on the weekly Spanish Albums Chart and sold 200,000 copies; it ranked tenth in the year-end albums chart.

In 2004, Beth released live album and DVD Palau de la Música Catalana, from her first concert tour Gira Otra realidad 03-04.

On 9 October 2006, Beth released her second studio album, My Own Way Home, this time with Warner Music. Most of the album was composed in London.

On 18 May 2010, Beth released her first Catalan language album, Segueix-me el fil. At the same time, she developed a career as a theatre actress, and in 2013 she starred in the stage musical La Dona vinguda del futur, produced by the Teatre Nacional de Catalunya and created by Marc Rosich and Guille Milkyway.

Beth's fourth studio album, Família was released in 2013.

== Discography ==
Album information
Otra realidad
- Released: 23 April 2003 (SPN)
- Peak Positions: #1 (SPN)
- AFYVE Certification: 200.000 units (2xPlatinum)
- Official Singles:
  - 2003 "Dime" (Eurosong 2003, #8) — #1 (SPN)
  - 2003 "Parando El Tiempo" — #3 (SPN)
  - 2004 "Otra Realidad" — #4 (SPN)
  - 2004 "Estás" — #7 (SPN)
Palau de la Música Catalana
- Released: 20 April 2004 (SPN)
- Peak positions: #4 (SPN)
- AFYVE certification: 50.000 (Gold)
- Official single:
  - 2004 "La Luz (Live)" — #2 (SPN)
My Own Way Home
- Released: 9 October 2006 (SPN)
- Peak positions: #57
- Official singles:
  - 2006 "Rain On Me"
  - 2007 "All These Things"
Segueix-me el fil
- Released: 18 May 2010 (SPN)
- Peak positions: #37
- Official singles:
  - 2010 "Tots els botons"
  - 2010 "Terra trencada"
Família
- Released: 17 September 2013 (SPN)
- Peak positions: #37
- Official singles:
  - 2013 "Ara i Aquí"

Awards and achievements
Preceded by Rosa with "Europe's Living a Celebration"	Spain in the Eurovision Song Contest; 2003	Succeeded by Ramón with "Para llenarme de ti"
