= Ainhoa Cantalapiedra =

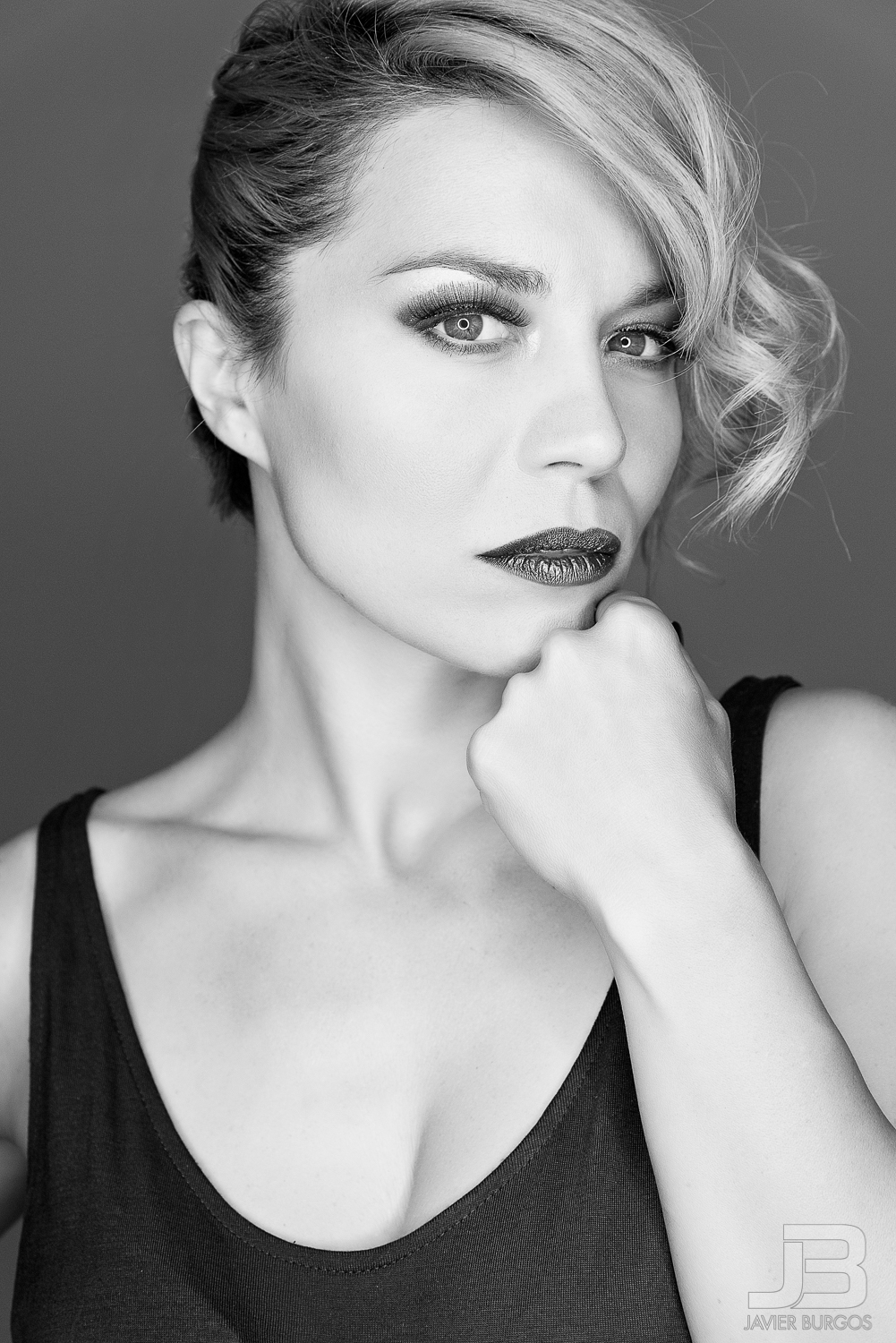
- Ainhoa Cantalapiedra by Javier Burgos

Background information
- Born: Ainhoa Cantalapiedra Cuñado; 25 September 1980 (age 45); Galdakao (Biscay), Spain
- Genres: Rock, Pop, Contemporary, Folk, Indie
- Years active: 2002–present
- Website: www.ainhoacantalapiedra.com

Ainhoa Cantalapiedra Cuñado (born 25 September 1980) is a Spanish singer and songwriter.

She is the winner of the second series of Operación Triunfo (Spanish version of Star Academy).

== Early life ==
Born in Galdakao, since 1998 she has been in many groups of different styles, and was once given the nickname of 'la Céline' (Galdakao's reference to their very own Celine Dion).

== Operación Triunfo ==
In 2002, she became a contestant in the second series of Spanish Star Academy, Operación Triunfo. Within a week, she ended up in line for eviction, but managed to survive against Mai Meneses, who is now a member of the group Nena Daconte. Ainhoa came up for eviction 2 more times while being on the show. Her Renditions of Celine Dion's Si Tu Eres Mi Hombre and Monica Naranjo's Sobrevivire made her one of the favorites to win. She went on to win the show with over 34% of the votes split between her and the remaining 6 finalists. She received one million Euros and a record deal with Vale Music.

== Post O.T ==
In 2003, Ainhoa released her highly anticipated debut album, "Esencia Natural" (Natural Essence). It was produced by Latin Grammy Award-winning record executive, Emilio Estefan, and was very successful in Spain, selling 80,000 copies on its first week of release, selling over 300,000 copies later on. However, close to 1 million people voted for her to win Operación Triunfo. The first single was "Acéptame Así", the second was "El Amor Me Está Llamando" (a version of LeAnn Rimes's "Love Must Be Telling Me Something"), and the third was "Decídete". Also in this year, Ainhoa recorded the theme tune for the Spanish animation series Glup, noticeably in Spanish, Catalan and her native Basque.

A year later, Ainhoa released her second studio album, "Mi Tiempo Roto" (My Broken/Distraught Time). Her image became a lot more rock (compared to Avril Lavigne), and was not well appreciated by fans. The first single was the track "Seguire Estando Yo", which received limited radio play. The follow-up single was the track "Salir Corriendo". To date, the album has sold over 50,000 copies. The record was considered a failure in the charts and in comparison to the sales of her debut album.

In 2005, Ainhoa stayed out of the public view. However, in December 2005, Ainhoa sang "Can't Help Falling In Love" live with Soraya Arnelas on an Operación Triunfo Christmas special (this duet was originally recorded by Ainhoa and Marey on the 2003 Operación Triunfo Season 2 compilation "Fuerza de la Vida"). On this same show, Ainhoa revealed that she was working on a brand new album.

In 2006, Ainhoa parted ways with Vale Music due to creative differences and signed a new deal with another management. Ainhoa said that she wanted to create an album which defined who she really was as an artist, and that staying with Vale Music would not allow her to make that creative difference.

== Imperfecta—Present ==
After much delay of the release of her third studio album, it was finally released on January 31, 2008 under the name, "Imperfecta" (Imperfect). Almost four years since the release of her last album. Her new album, Imperfecta, is made up of original compositions, with all of its 11 tracks written and composed by Ainhoa herself, 10 songs in Spanish and one in English. The album was put online as a free legal download, which can now be downloaded from her unofficial website (www.ainhoa.info).

As of December 2008, "Imperfecta" has had over 30,000 downloads through 'www.Ainhoa.info'

After great demand and continuous requests from fans, her third studio album "Imperfecta" was released on physical CD format in 2009. The album was then first available to buy in shops and eligible to enter the charts. All information is available on Ainhoa's new, official website (www.Ainhoacantalapiedra.com). The album was finally released to Spanish stores on 13 April 2009.

In 2010, Ainhoa released a new single entitled "Volveré" (I'll Return). The track competed in the competition to select the Spanish entry for the Eurovision Song Contest 2010. It finished 6th in the Spanish national final.

== Discography ==
Album	Released	Peak positions	Sales	Record label	Singles
Esencia Natural (debut album)	September 25, 2003 (SPN)	#4	Gold (50.000 units)	Vale Music	Official singles: 2003 "Aceptame Asi"; 2003 "El Amor Me Esta Llamando"; 2004 "Decidete"; 2004 "Emotional Rescue"
Mi Tiempo Roto (second album)	October 13, 2004 (SPN)	#20		Vale Music	Official singles: 2004 "Seguire Estando Yo"; 2005 "Salir Corriendo"; 2005 "Cuando Existe El Amor"
Imperfecta (third album)	January 31, 2008 (SPN)			ACC Music	Official singles: 2008 "My Prisoner"; 2008 "Hasta El Final"; 2008 "Crece"; 2008 "Estas Aqui"; 2008 "Recuerdame"; 2009 "My Prisoner" (re-release)

- Imperfecta (initially only released via free download off her website. CD version in shops as of 2009) (in 10 months there have been over 30.000 downloads of the album)

=== Esencia Natural track listing ===
1. Inquilino
2. Acéptame Así
3. No Hieras Mas
4. El Amor Me Está Llamando
5. Buscando Señales Divinas
6. Cuando Tú No Estás
7. Decídete
8. Le Digo Adiós Al Ayer
9. Resignación
10. Emotional Rescue
11. Lo Bueno Queda
12. El Camaleón

=== Mi Tiempo Roto track listing ===
1. Seguiré Estando Yo
2. Tengo Que Aprender
3. Mi Oportunidad
4. Siempre Amanece
5. Cuando Existe El Amor
6. Es Mi Juego
7. Dame Una Razón
8. A Veces
9. Salir Corriendo
10. Buscando Quién Eres
11. Cristales Rotos
12. En Silencio

=== Imperfecta track listing ===
1. Suerte
2. Crece
3. Estás Aqui
4. Mi Hogar
5. Recuérdame
6. Tu Mejor Animal
7. No Hay Lugar
8. Hasta El Final
9. Entre Tanto
10. Las Calles De Madrid
11. My Prisoner

Preceded by Rosa López	Operación Triunfo Winner; 2002–2003	Succeeded by Vicente Segui
