= Tony Santos =

Spanish funk/R&B singer

Tony Santos is a Spanish funk/R&B singer. His first album in Spain, Alma Negra (2003), sold over 200,000 copies, and the first three singles from the album ("Actitud", "Sigo Mi Camino" and "Un Hombre Así") reached number one in the Spanish charts. He was a contestant on Operación Triunfo.

His first single, "Actitud", was written by Alan Glass (American writer based in the UK), David Brant (best known for producing and writing for Mis-Teeq, Liberty X and Nate James), and Thomas Jules-Stock, lead singer of the former Parlophone boy band 3rd Edge.

Santos' second album, Sexy, was released in 2006.
