= Više nisam tvoja =

2003 song by Claudia Beni

Single by Claudia Beni
- Language: Croatian, English
- Released: 2003
- Songwriter: Andrej Babić

Eurovision Song Contest 2003 entry
- Country: Croatia
- Artist: Claudia Beni
- Languages: Croatian, English
- Composer: Andrej Babić
- Lyricist: Andrej Babić

Finals performance
- Final result: 15th
- Final points: 29

Entry chronology
- ◄ "Everything I Want" (2002)
- "You Are the Only One" (2004) ►

"Više nisam tvoja" ("I'm not yours anymore") is a song by Claudia Beni. It represented Croatia in the Eurovision Song Contest 2003. Beni first entered the song in Dora 2003, public broadcaster HRT's contest to choose Croatia's Eurovision entry. It prevailed, placing second in the semi-finals and first in the final contest. Following a debate over whether Beni should perform the song in Croatian or English at Eurovision, HRT hosted another contest, with Beni performing both versions of the song and allowing Croatians to cast votes via phone. The Croatian version won overwhelmingly, though it was ultimately decided that Beni would perform the song in a mix of the two languages.

Beni performed eighth on the night and came in fifteenth place out of 26 entries, receiving a total of 29 points from six nations. The song went on to appear on the annual Eurovision compilation, as well as Beni's 2004 studio album Čista Kao Suza.

== Composition ==
"Više nisam tvoja" was written and produced by Croatian songwriter Andrej Babić. The song has a length of two minutes and fifty-one seconds.

== Eurovision Song Contest ==
=== Dora 2003 ===
Beni entered "Više nisam tvoja" into Dora 2003, the annual Croatian contest to select the country's Eurovision entry. It marked her second time in the contest; in 1999, at the age of 12, she had participated as part of a pop group called Teens. She first performed the song at the Dora semifinals in March 2003, in which the song placed second out of 12 entries and thereby qualified for the national final. A week later, in the final, Beni placed first, being voted the maximum 12 points in each of Croatia's regions. At the time of her victory, Beni was 17 years old.

Following the song's victory, there was a debate about whether it should be sung in Croatian or English for her Eurovision Song Contest performance. HRT, Croatia's public broadcaster, hosted a radio and television special on 16 March 2003 to determine whether it should be performed as "Više nisam tvoja" or as its English version, "This is For Real". The original, Croatian version won in a landslide, receiving 10,926 televotes compared to 5,678 for the English version. However, HRT ultimately decided to have Beni perform her version in a mix of the two languages, using Croatian for all but the last part of the song, which would be sung in English.

=== Eurovision ===
The song was performed eighth on the night, following Portugal's Rita Guerra with "Deixa-me sonhar" and preceding Cyprus' Stelios Constantas with "Feeling Alive". For her Eurovision performance, Claudia wore coloured dress, and was accompanied by four backing singers. On the last note of the song, the backing singers lifted Claudia into the air. At the close of voting, it had received 29 points, placing 15th in a field of 26. It received eight points from Slovenia and six points each from Ireland and Bosnia-Herzegovina, as well as receiving points from Austria, Turkey, and Greece.

It was succeeded as Croatian representative at the 2004 contest by Ivan Mikulić with "You Are the Only One".

== Legacy ==
Beni's Eurovision performance of "Više nisam tvoja" was featured as the eighth track on the official Eurovision Song Contest 2003 compilation, while the original live recording of "Više nisam tvoja", performed at Dora 2003, went on to be featured on Beni's 2004 studio album, Čista Kao Suza. In 2006, Beni competed to represent Croatia a second time in the Eurovision Song Contest, entering the song "Samo Ti Mi Ostani" ("Just Stay with Me") in the national Dora 2006 competition; the song ultimately placed fourteenth in the semi-finals, losing to Severina's "Moja štikla".
