= Croatia in the Eurovision Song Contest 2004 =

- Eurovision Song Contest 2004
- Participating broadcaster: Hrvatska radiotelevizija (HRT)
- Country: Croatia
- Selection process: Dora 2004
- Selection date: 14 March 2004

Competing entry
- Song: "You Are the Only One"
- Artist: Ivan Mikulić
- Songwriters: Ivan Mikulić; Vedran Ostojić; Duško Gruborović

Placement
- Semi-final result: Qualified (9th, 72 points)
- Final result: 12th, 50 points

Participation chronology

Croatia was represented at the Eurovision Song Contest 2004 with the song "You Are the Only One", composed by Ivan Mikulić, with lyris by Vedran Ostojić and Duško Gruborović, and performed by Mikulić himself. The Croatian participating broadcaster, Hrvatska radiotelevizija (HRT), organised the national final Dora 2004 to select its entry for the contest. Twenty-four entries competed in the national final which consisted of three shows: two semi-finals and a final. Six entries qualified from each semi-final on 12 and 13 March 2004 to compete in the final on 14 March 2004. In the final, "Daješ mi krila" performed by Ivan Mikulić was selected as the winner following a regional televote. The song was later translated from Croatian to English for Eurovision and was titled "You Are the Only One".

Croatia competed in the semi-final of the Eurovision Song Contest which took place on 12 May 2004. Performing during the show in position 18, "You Are the Only One" was announced among the top 10 entries of the semi-final and therefore qualified to compete in the final on 15 May. It was later revealed that Croatia placed ninth out of the 22 participating countries in the semi-final with 72 points. In the final, Croatia performed in position 11 and placed twelfth out of the 24 participating countries, scoring 50 points.

== Background ==
Prior to the 2004 contest, Hrvatska radiotelevizija (HRT) had participated in the Eurovision Song Contest representing Croatia eleven times since its first entry in 1993. Its best result in the contest was fourth, achieved on two occasions: in 1996 with the song "Sveta ljubav" performed by Maja Blagdan and in 1999 with the song "Marija Magdalena" performed by Doris Dragović. In 2003, "Više nisam tvoja" performed by Claudia Beni placed fifteenth.

As part of its duties as participating broadcaster, HRT organises the selection of its entry in the Eurovision Song Contest and broadcasts the event in the country. Since 1993, HRT organised the national final Dora in order to select its entry for the contest, a method that was continued for its 2004 participation.

== Before Eurovision ==
=== Dora 2004 ===
Dora 2004 was the twelfth edition of the Croatian national selection Dora organised by HRT to select its entry for the Eurovision Song Contest 2004. The competition consisted of two semi-finals on 12 and 13 March 2004 and a final on 14 March 2004, all taking place at the Hotel Kvarner in Opatija and broadcast on HTV1 as well as online via the broadcaster's website hrt.hr.

==== Format ====
Twenty-four songs competed in Dora 2004 which consisted of three shows: two semi-finals and a final. Twelve songs competed in each semi-final with the top six proceeding to complete the twelve-song lineup in the final. The results of all shows were determined solely by public televoting. Votes cast via landline were divided into five telephone regions in Croatia, each of them which created an overall ranking from which points from 1 (lowest) to 12 (highest) were assigned to the competing songs. An additional set of points from 1 to 12 was assigned based on the votes cast via mobiles, which included options for telephone and SMS voting. Ties in all shows were decided in favour of the entry that received the higher number of high-scoring points.

Dora 2004 televoting regions
- A: Slavonia
- B: Dalmatia
- C: Istria, Primorje-Gorski Kotar and Lika
- D: Northwest and Central Croatia
- E: District and City of Zagreb

==== Competing entries ====
On 3 December 2003, HRT opened a submission period where artists and composers were able to submit their entries to the broadcaster with the deadline on 17 January 2004. 297 entries were received by the broadcaster during the submission period. A seven-member expert committee consisting of representatives of HRT: Željko Mesar, Aleksandar Kostadinov, Željen Klašterka, Tomislav Štengl, Zoran Brajša, Marin Margetić and Dubravko Češnjak reviewed the received submissions and selected twenty-four artists and songs for the competition. HRT announced the competing entries on 24 January 2004.

Artist	Song	Songwriter(s)
Alen Nižetić	"Pala si sa neba"	Daniel Hojsak, Marina Ergotić
Andrea	"Noah"	Tonči Huljić, Vjekoslava Huljić
Andrea Čubrić	"Diva"	Davor Devčić, Mirza Tetarić
Angie	"Umrla bih ja na tvojim rukama"	Neno Ninčević, Miro Buljan
Azzuro	"Trebam te"	Davor Devčić, Borivoj Vincetić
Chanté	"Zašto pitaš"	Vanda Jirasek, David Vurdelja
En Face	"Tvoje lice"	Sandro Bastiančić, Miroslav Vidović
Ibrica Jusić	"Još samo ovaj put"	Mario Vukelić
Ina	"Ti si moja nesreća"	Zrinko Tutić
Ivan Mikulić	"Daješ mi krila"	Ivan Mikulić, Vedran Ostojić, Duško Gruborović
Ivana Kindl	"Strastvena žena"	Ivana Kindl, Silvio Pasarić, Igor Mazul
Jacques Houdek	"Nema razloga"	Jacques Houdek, Boris Đurđević
Karma	"Malo pomalo"	Josip Miani, Nenad Čirjak, Darko Duvnjak-Darus
Lana	"Prava istina"	Milana Vlaović
Magnetic	"Iluzija"	Daniel Hojsak, Marina Ergotić
Merita's and Massimo	"Odjednom ti"	Meri Jaman, Anita Valo, Ines Prajo, Arijana Kunštek
Mladen Grdović	"Ljubav moja si ti"	Mladen Grdović
P'eggy	"Sve"	Predrag Martinjak, Ante Pecotić
Petra Kosalec	"Ostani"	Petra Kosalec
Renata Holi	"Nosiš mi proljeće"	Marko Tomasović, Nevia Korpar
Rivers	"Kiša ljubavi"	Elvis Stanić
Sandra	"Gdje snovi počinju"	Darko Juranović, Sandra Berković
Tina Vukov and Matija Dedić Trio	"Tuga dolazi kasnije"	Robert Funčić
Vladimir Bodegrajac	"Ne plači"	Vladimir Bodegrajac

==== Semi-finals ====
The two semi-finals took place on 12 and 13 March 2004, hosted by Duško Ćurlić who was joined by Tihana Zrnić in the first semi-final and Barbara Radulović in the second semi-final. The six qualifiers for the final from each semi-final were determined by a public televote divided into regional and mobile phone votes. In addition to the performances of the competing entries, Ruslana (who won Eurovision for Ukraine in 2004) performed as the interval act during the first semi-final.

Semi-final 1 – 12 March 2004
R/O	Artist	Song	Televoting Regions					Mobiles	Total	Place
R/O	Artist	Song	A	B	C	D	E	Mobiles	Total	Place
1	Chanté	"Zašto pitaš"	5	4	5	5	9	5	33	8
2	Sandra	"Gdje snovi počinju"	1	3	2	4	2	1	13	10
3	Angie	"Umrla bih ja na tvojim rukama"	3	1	1	3	1	3	12	12
4	Azzuro	"Trebam te"	2	2	3	1	3	2	13	11
5	Renata Holi	"Nosiš mi proljeće"	11	6	6	6	5	6	40	7
6	Karma	"Malo pomalo"	10	9	12	12	8	11	62	3
7	Andrea Čubrić	"Diva"	4	5	4	2	4	4	23	9
8	Andrea	"Noah"	9	11	11	10	11	10	62	2
9	Mladen Grdović	"Ljubav moja si ti"	6	12	10	9	6	8	51	4
10	Alen Nižetić	"Pala si sa neba"	8	7	7	7	7	7	43	6
11	Merita's and Massimo	"Odjednom ti"	7	8	8	8	10	9	50	5
12	Jacques Houdek	"Nema razloga"	12	10	9	11	12	12	66	1

Semi-final 2 – 13 March 2004
R/O	Artist	Song	Televoting Regions					Mobiles	Total	Place
R/O	Artist	Song	A	B	C	D	E	Mobiles	Total	Place
1	Rivers	"Kiša ljubavi"	3	6	7	5	4	4	28	9
2	Petra Kosalec	"Ostani"	6	8	4	7	8	8	41	5
3	Vladimir Bodegrajac	"Ne plači"	7	2	2	2	2	3	18	11
4	Magnetic	"Iluzija"	10	5	5	8	5	7	40	6
5	Tina Vukov and Matija Dedić Trio	"Tuga dolazi kasnije"	2	7	8	3	3	6	29	8
6	Ivana Kindl	"Strastvena žena"	9	9	6	9	9	9	51	4
7	Ina	"Ti si moja nesreća"	5	3	3	4	7	2	24	10
8	P'eggy	"Sve"	1	1	1	1	1	1	6	12
9	Lana	"Prava istina"	11	10	9	11	10	11	62	2
10	En Face	"Tvoje lice"	4	4	11	6	6	5	36	7
11	Ibrica Jusić	"Još samo ovaj put"	8	11	10	10	11	10	60	3
12	Ivan Mikulić	"Daješ mi krila"	12	12	12	12	12	12	72	1

==== Final ====
The final took place on 14 March 2004, hosted by Duško Ćurlić, Tihana Zrnić and Barbara Radulović. The winner, "Daješ mi krila" performed by Ivan Mikulić, was determined by a public televote divided into regional and mobile phone votes. In addition to the performances of the competing entries, Maksim Mrvica, Ana Rucner, Laura Vadjon, Lana Kos and Claudia Beni (who represented Croatia in 2003) performed as the interval acts during the show.

Final – 14 March 2004
R/O	Artist	Song	Televoting Regions					Mobiles	Total	Place
R/O	Artist	Song	A	B	C	D	E	Mobiles	Total	Place
1	Magnetic	"Iluzija"	7	2	2	2	3	3	19	10
2	Petra Kosalec	"Ostani"	1	1	1	1	5	2	11	12
3	Alen Nizetic	"Pala si sa neba"	4	4	3	3	2	1	17	11
4	Merita's and Massimo	"Odjednom ti"	3	5	7	5	6	6	32	7
5	Ivana Kindl	"Strastvena žena"	5	3	4	6	4	5	27	8
6	Mladen Grdović	"Ljubav moja si ti"	2	7	6	4	1	4	24	9
7	Ibrica Jusić	"Još samo ovaj put"	6	10	8	8	9	8	49	5
8	Lana	"Prava istina"	8	6	5	7	7	7	40	6
9	Andrea	"Noah"	11	11	11	11	11	12	67	2
10	Karma	"Malo pomalo"	10	8	10	10	8	10	56	3
11	Jacques Houdek	"Nema razloga"	9	9	9	9	10	9	55	4
12	Ivan Mikulić	"Daješ mi krila"	12	12	12	12	12	11	71	1

== At Eurovision ==
It was announced that the competition's format would be expanded to include a semi-final in 2004. According to the rules, all nations with the exceptions of the host country, the "Big Four" (France, Germany, Spain and the United Kingdom), and the ten highest placed finishers in the 2003 contest are required to qualify from the semi-final on 12 May 2004 in order to compete for the final on 15 May 2004; the top ten countries from the semi-final progress to the final. On 23 March 2004, a special allocation draw was held which determined the running order for the semi-final and Croatia was set to perform in position 19, following the entry from Estonia and before the entry from Denmark. Ivan Mikulić performed the English version of "Daješ mi krila" at the contest, titled "You Are the Only One" (formerly "You Were My Only Love"). At the end of the semi-final, Croatia was announced as having finished in the top 10 and consequently qualifying for the grand final. It was later revealed that Croatia placed ninth in the semi-final, receiving a total of 72 points. The draw for the running order for the final was done by the presenters during the announcement of the ten qualifying countries during the semi-final and Croatia was drawn to perform in position 11, following the entry from Ukraine and before the entry from Bosnia and Herzegovina. Croatia placed twelfth in the final, scoring 50 points.

Both the semi-final and the final were broadcast in Croatia on HRT with commentary by Aleksandar Kostadinov. HRT appointed Barbara Kolar as its spokesperson to announce the Croatian votes during the final.

=== Voting ===
Below is a breakdown of points awarded to Croatia and awarded by Croatia in the semi-final and grand final of the contest. The nation awarded its 12 points to Serbia and Montenegro in the semi-final and the final of the contest.

Following the release of the televoting figures by the EBU after the conclusion of the competition, it was revealed that a total of 61,070 televotes were cast in Croatia during the two shows: 20,850 votes during the semi-final and 40,220 votes during the final.

==== Points awarded to Croatia ====
Points awarded to Croatia (Semi-final)
Score	Country
12 points	
10 points	Bosnia and Herzegovina
8 points	Austria; Ukraine
7 points	Belarus; Slovenia
6 points	Macedonia; Switzerland
5 points	Germany; Serbia and Montenegro
4 points	Netherlands
3 points	Lithuania
2 points	
1 point	Finland; Latvia; Portugal

Points awarded to Croatia (Final)
Score	Country
12 points	
10 points	Bosnia and Herzegovina
8 points	
7 points	Ukraine
6 points	
5 points	Belarus; Macedonia; Russia; Slovenia; Serbia and Montenegro
4 points	
3 points	Austria; Switzerland
2 points	
1 point	Finland; Germany

==== Points awarded by Croatia ====
Points awarded by Croatia (Semi-final)
Score	Country
12 points	Serbia and Montenegro
10 points	Bosnia and Herzegovina
8 points	Ukraine
7 points	Albania
6 points	Greece
5 points	Macedonia
4 points	Netherlands
3 points	Slovenia
2 points	Cyprus
1 point	Malta

Points awarded by Croatia (Final)
Score	Country
12 points	Serbia and Montenegro
10 points	Bosnia and Herzegovina
8 points	Ukraine
7 points	Greece
6 points	Albania
5 points	Macedonia
4 points	Cyprus
3 points	Turkey
2 points	Malta
1 point	Germany
