= Alf Poier =

Austrian musician, writer, artist and singer

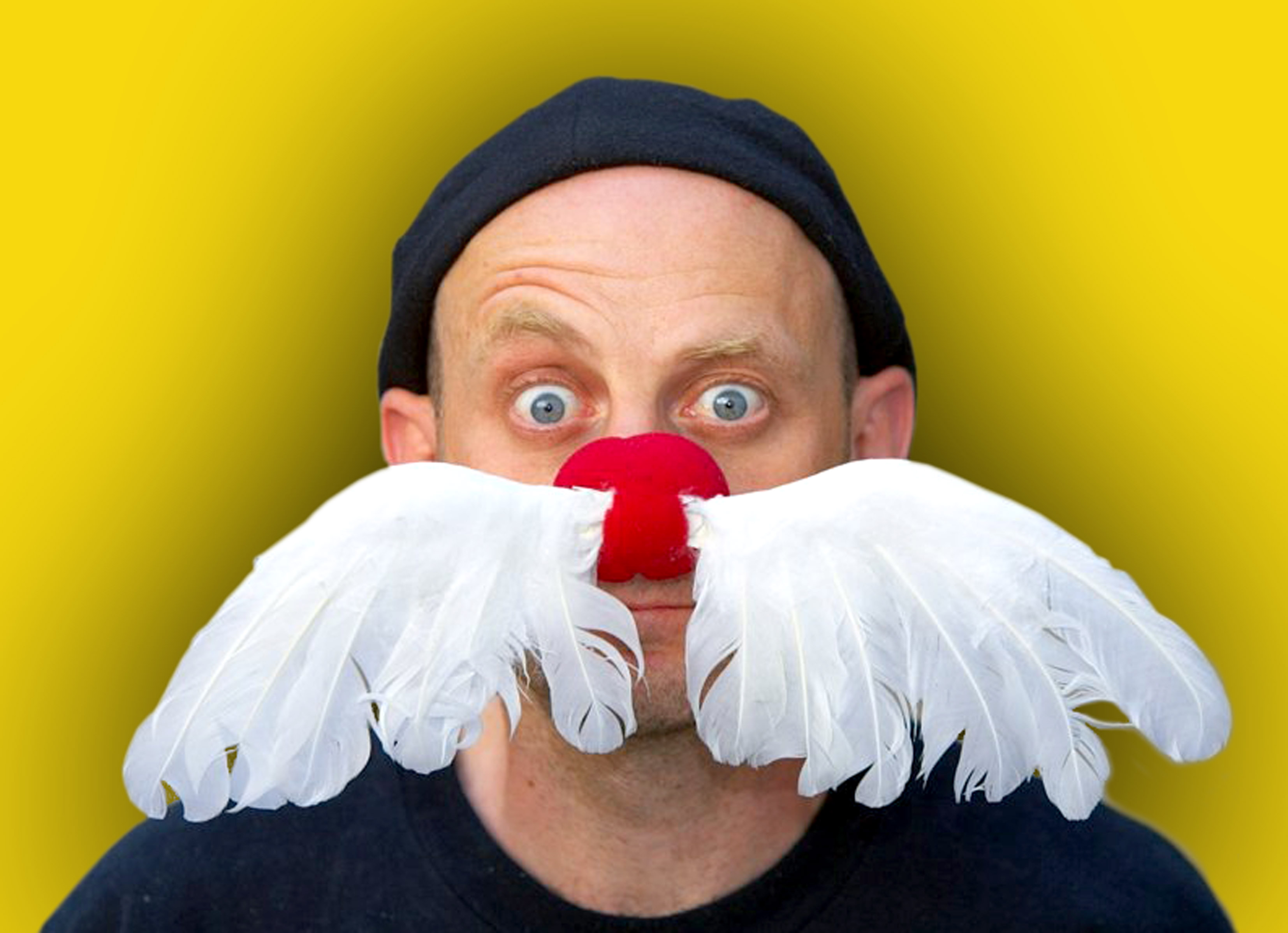
Typical Alf

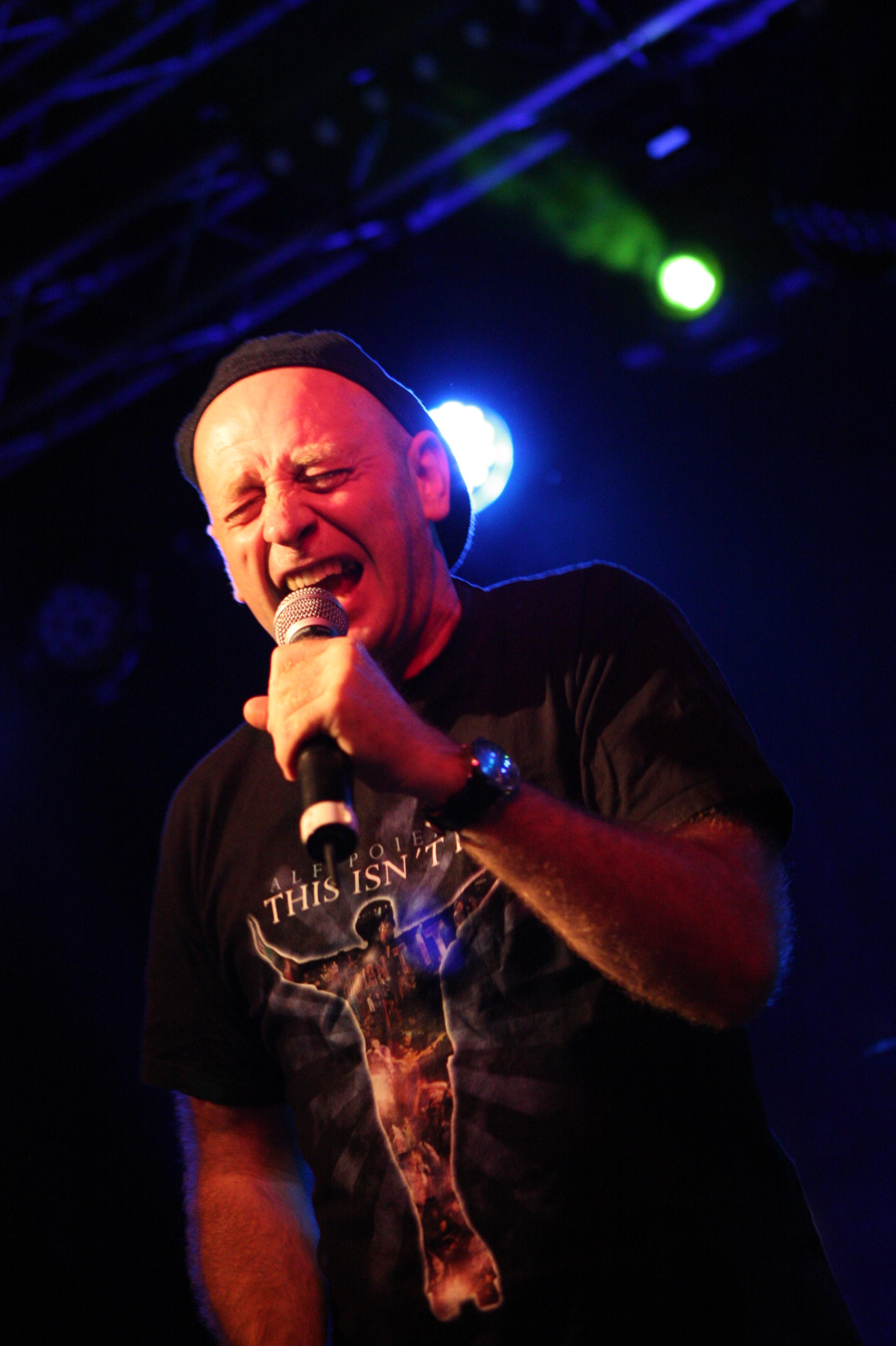
Alf Poier performing at the Picture On Festival 2012 in Bildein, Austria

Alf Poier (born 22 February 1967 in Judenburg, Styria) is an Austrian artist and stand-up comedian.

== Biography ==
Born in Judenburg in Styria, he started doing cabaret in 1995 in Graz, and has won several prizes for his work, including the Salzburger Stier in 1998, the Deutscher Kleinkunstpreis, Prix Phanteon, German Comedy Awards (Best Newcomer) in 2000, the Austrian Österreichischer Kabarettpreis in 2002 and the Austrian Ybbsiade in 2009.

In 2003, Poier participated in the Eurovision Song Contest 2003 and secured 6th place with his entry Weil der Mensch zählt (Because mankind matters). The song, and his stage act, which included references to different animals, were a parody of the contest's excesses.

Although his result was considerably better than most of the pre-contest predictions, Poier spent several hours mischievously telling anyone that would listen that his 'low' placing was an outrage, that Europe had demonstrably shown itself to have no musical taste, and that he wasn't sure if the shame would permit him to return to Austria. This included an appearance on Liquid Eurovision, shown on the UK channel BBC Three immediately after the 2003 contest ended, where after saying the above he shouted "I hate this contest! Fuck this contest!", causing much laughter from the presenters.

In 2005, his bid to represent Austria in the contest for a second time put him in the spotlight for more serious reasons, as some people took offence at the lyrics of one of his songs, Good Old Europe is Dying. Having deleted the offending lines, albeit while insisting they had been misinterpreted, Poier took the characteristically 'oddball' song to the brink of securing the Austrian national selection, only to be "narrowly" beaten by folk band Global Kryner. In the end, he arguably only missed out because, in Y asi, Global Kryner had somehow succeeded in crafting a song that is even more colourful than anything Poier has yet attempted, featuring as it does Latin-style music liberally peppered with bouts of yodelling. Nevertheless, Poier was able to - very loudly - claim a moral victory after it emerged that his song had actually garnered the most votes (2nd place with 106.000 for Poier, 1st place with 60.000 for Global Kryner), and had only been thwarted by the regional points system that was used.

Alf Poiers statement after the show:

"Wer auf dieser Welt Gerechtigkeit fordert ist ein Idiot!
Wer auf dieser Welt Verständnis fordert ist geistesgestört!
Ich danke Euch allen im Namen der Wahrheit!
Alf Poier Platz 2 mit 106.000 Stimmen
Global Kryner Platz 1 mit 60.000 Stimmen

Euer geistesgestörter Idiot Alf Poier"

"Who demands justice in this world is an idiot!
Who demands understanding in this world suffers on mental disorder!
I thank you all in the name of truth!
Alf Poier, 2nd place with 106.000 votes
Global Kryner, 1st place with 60.000 votes

Your mental disordered idiot, Alf Poier"

== Discography ==
- 1996: Himmel, Arsch & Gartenzwerg (Album-CD, Alf Poier und die obersteirische Wolfshilfe)
- 2001: Zen (Album-CD)
- 2003: Weil der Mensch zählt (Single-CD)
- 2003: Alf singt die schönsten Lieder mit Band (Album-CD)
- 2003: Mitsubischi (DVD, Neuerscheinung 2008)
- 2005: Good Old Europe Is Dying (Single-CD)
- 2005: Lustige Lieder der Traurigkeit und Not (Album-CD)
- 2007: Zen (DVD)
- 2007: Kill Eulenspiegel (DVD)
- 2009: Satsang (DVD)
- 2010: This Isn’t It (Album-CD, live)
- 2011: Happy Song (Download-Single, Alf Poier & Die Obersteirische Wolfshilfe)

Awards and achievements
Preceded by Manuel Ortega with "Say a Word"	Austria in the Eurovision Song Contest; 2003	Succeeded by Tie Break with "Du bist"
