= Israel in the Eurovision Song Contest 2003 =

- Eurovision Song Contest 2003
- Participating broadcaster: Israel Broadcasting Authority (IBA)
- Country: Israel
- Selection process: Artist: Internal selection Song: Kdam Eurovision 2003
- Selection date: Artist: 15 November 2002; Song: 23 January 2003

Competing entry
- Song: "Words for Love"
- Artist: Lior Narkis
- Songwriters: Yoni Roeh; Yossi Gispan

Placement
- Final result: 19th, 17 points

Participation chronology

Israel was represented at the Eurovision Song Contest 2003 with the song "Words for Love", composed by Yoni Roeh, with lyrics by Yossi Gispan, and performed by Lior Narkis. The Israeli participating broadcaster, the Israel Broadcasting Authority (IBA), selected its entry through the national final Kdam Eurovision 2003, after having previously selected the performer internally. The national final took place on 23 January 2003 and featured four songs. "Milim La'Ahava" emerged as the winning song after gaining the most points following the combination of a jury vote and a public televote. The song was later retitled as "Words for Love".

Israel competed in the Eurovision Song Contest which took place on 24 May 2003. Performing during the show in position 13, Israel placed nineteenth out of the 26 participating countries, scoring 17 points.

== Background ==
Prior to the 2003 contest, the Israel Broadcasting Authority (IBA) had participated in the Eurovision Song Contest representing Israel twenty-five times since its first entry in 1973. It has won the contest on three occasions: in 1978 with the song "A-Ba-Ni-Bi" by Izhar Cohen and the Alphabeta, in 1979 with the song "Hallelujah" by Milk and Honey, in 1998 with the song "Diva" by Dana International. In 2002, "Light a Candle" performed by Sarit Hadad placed twelfth.

As part of its duties as participating broadcaster, IBA organises the selection of its entry in the Eurovision Song Contest and broadcasts the event in the country. The broadcaster confirmed its participation in the 2003 contest on 6 November 2002. To select its entry for 2003, IBA conducted an internal selection to select the artist and a national final to select the song for the artist.

== Before Eurovision ==
=== Artist selection ===
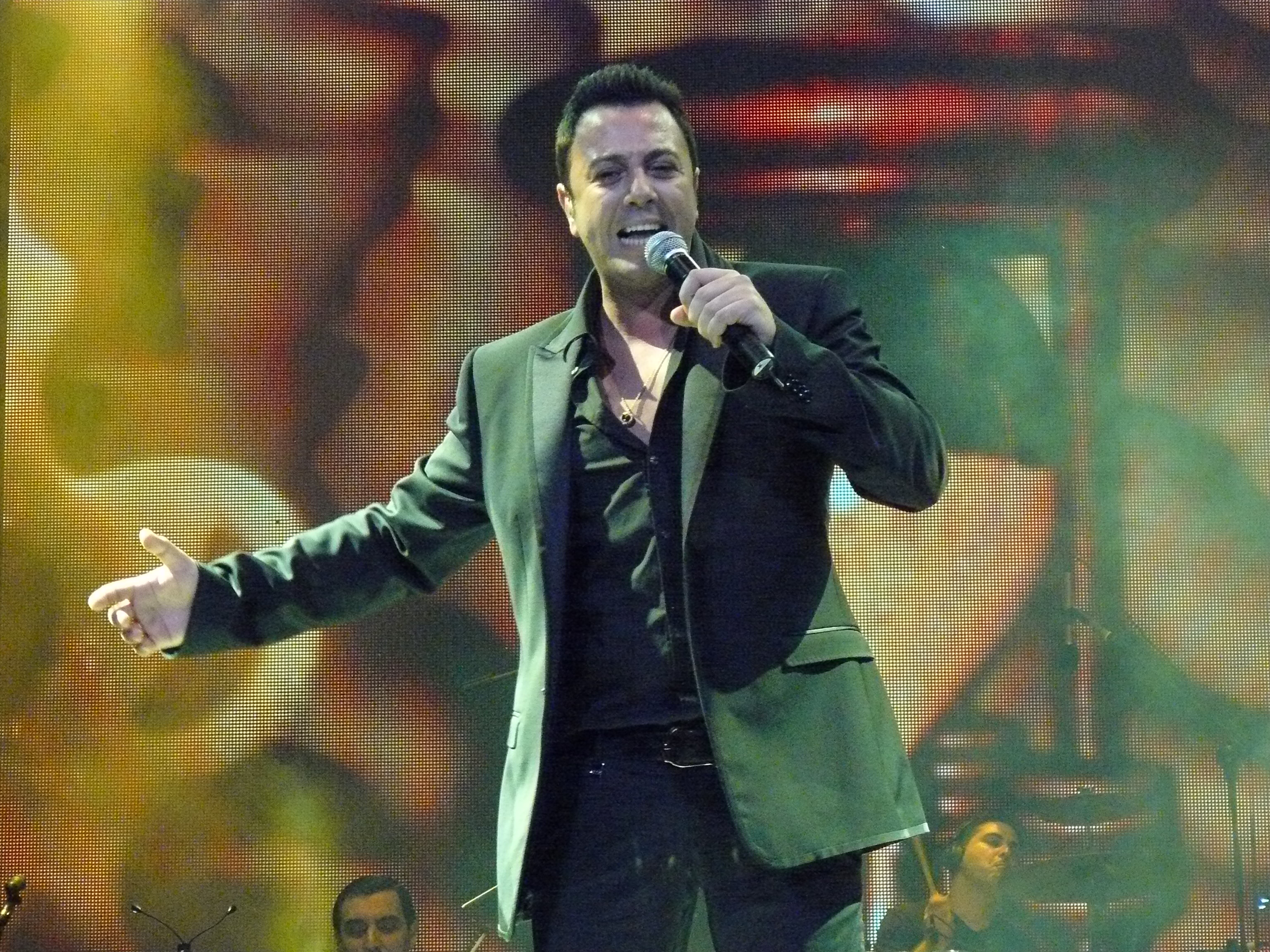
Lior Narkis was internally selected to represent Israel in the Eurovision Song Contest 2003

On 15 November 2002, IBA announced that Lior Narkis was selected by a special committee as its representative for the Eurovision Song Contest 2003. Among artists that were highly considered before Narkis was ultimately selected included David D'Or, Eyal Golan, Zehava Ben, Eyal Shahar, Teapacks, and Yevgeny Shapovalov with Shlomit Aharon. The members of the committee were Dalia Cohen-Simcha (member of the IBA Executive Committee), Nili Carmel-Yonathan (member of the IBA Executive Committee), Reuven Shalom (member of the IBA Executive Committee), Naomi Atias (producer at Channel 1), Yitzhak Sonnenshein (Head of Israeli Eurovision delegation), Yaakov Mendel (Chairman of the Israeli Union of Performing Artists), Daniel Ben-Khalif (journalist), Eran Hadas (journalist), Jojo Abutbul (journalist), Yoav Ginai (composer), Margalit Tzan'ani (singer), Shalva Berti (singer), Ezra Suleiman (CEO of the Israeli Mediterranean Music Association) and Roy Spiegel (youth movements representative).

=== Kdam Eurovision 2003 ===
The song that Lior Narkis represented Israel with in Riga was selected through the national final Kdam Eurovision 2003. Four songs were chosen from over 250 submissions by Narkis and announced on 2 January 2003. The national final, which simultaneously celebrated Israel's 30th Anniversary since their first participation in the Eurovision Song Contest, took place on 23 January 2003 at the Ha'Oman 17 nightclub in Jerusalem, hosted by Eden Harel and broadcast on Channel 1. All four competing songs were performed by Lior Narkis and the winning song, "Milim La'Ahava", was selected by a combination of a public televote conducted through telephone and SMS (60%) and the votes from the committee members (40%). In addition to the performances of the competing songs, Narkis performed his song "Lekol Ehad Yesh" together with Sigal Shachmon. The national final was watched by less than 212,000 viewers in Israel with a market share of 12.8%.

Final – 23 January 2003
R/O	Song	Songwriter(s)	Jury (40%)	Televote (60%)	Total	Place
1	"God Bless the Universe"	Uzi Hitman, Yossi Gispan	8%	16%	12.8%	2
2	"Lo Rotze Lihyot Kokachav" (לא רוצה להיות כוכב)	Ilan Shahaf, Tzur Ben-Ze'ev	0%	5%	3%	4
3	"Choopy Choopy" (צ'ופי צ'ופי)	Yoni Ro'eh, Yossi Gispan	0%	15%	9%	3
4	"Milim La'Ahava" (מילים לאהבה)	Yoni Ro'eh, Yossi Gispan	92%	64%	75.2%	1

== At Eurovision ==
According to Eurovision rules, all nations with the exceptions of the bottom five countries in the 2002 contest competed in the final on 24 May 2003. On 29 November 2002, an allocation draw was held which determined the running order and Israel was set to perform in position 13, following the entry from Spain and before the entry from the Netherlands. Israel finished in 19th place with 17 points.

The show, which was televised live in Israel on Channel 1, received a market share of 32% (with a peak of 40%) and was the most watched programme of 2003 in the country.

=== Voting ===
Below is a breakdown of points awarded to Israel and awarded by Israel in the contest. The nation awarded its 12 points to Spain in the contest. IBA appointed Michal Zo'aretz as its spokesperson to announce the Israeli votes during the show.

Points awarded to Israel
Score	Country
12 points	
10 points	
8 points	France
7 points	
6 points	
5 points	Russia
4 points	
3 points	Greece
2 points	
1 point	Spain

Points awarded by Israel
Score	Country
12 points	Spain
10 points	Russia
8 points	Belgium
7 points	Turkey
6 points	Romania
5 points	Sweden
4 points	Ukraine
3 points	Norway
2 points	Netherlands
1 point	Cyprus
