= Russia in the Eurovision Song Contest 2003 =

- Eurovision Song Contest 2003
- Country: Russia
- Selection process: Internal selection
- Announcement date: Artist: 19 March 2003; Song: 3 April 2003

Competing entry
- Song: "Ne ver, ne boysya"
- Artist: t.A.T.u.
- Songwriters: Mars Lasar; Valery Polienko

Placement
- Final result: 3rd, 164 points

Participation chronology

Russia was represented at the Eurovision Song Contest 2003 with the song "Ne ver, ne boysya", written by Mars Lasar and Valery Polienko, and performed by t.A.T.u.. The Russian entry was selected internally by the Russian broadcaster Channel One Russia (C1R). At the contest, Russia placed 3rd and scored 164 points.

== Before Eurovision ==
=== Internal selection ===
On 26 January 2003, C1R announced a submission period for interested artists and composers to submit their entries until 1 March 2003. The broadcaster received 500 submissions at the conclusion of the deadline, including entries from Avraam Russo, Kristina Orbakaitė, Plazma and Smash. The jury which have consisted of Konstantin Ernst (general manager of C1R), Aleksandr Fifeman (general producer of C1R), Yuriy Aksyuta (music director of C1R), Vladimir Matetsky (singer-songwriter and producer) and Dmitri Malikov (singer, composer and producer) listened to submitted entries and was set to choose song for Eurovision, however, they did not find "anything suitable" among the submitted entries and decided to directly invite t.A.T.u to represent Russia. On 19 March 2003, C1R announced that they had internally selected t.A.T.u. to represent Russia in Riga with the song "Ne ver, ne boysya", composed by Valery Polienko and with lyrics by Mars Lasar.

==== Participants ====
Internal selection – Known submitted entries
Artist(s)	Song	Songwriter(s)
Avraam Russo	Unknown	Unknown
Dusha	"Ya ne boleyu toboy" (Я не болею тобой)	Dmitriy Moss, Artur A'Kim
Jam	Unknown	Unknown
Kevin	"Wonderful Light"	Kevin
Kristina Orbakaitė	Unknown	Unknown
Plazma	Unknown	Unknown
Smash	"Talk to Me"	Pam Sheyne, Ben Robbins, Michael Garvin, Andy Hill
t.A.T.u.	"Ne ver, ne boysya" (Не верь, не бойся)	Valery Polienko, Mars Lasar

== At Eurovision ==
Russia performed 11th at the 2003 Contest, following Germany and preceding Spain. After the voting concluded, Russia scored 164 points and placed 3rd, one point behind 2nd placed Belgium and 3 points behind the winner, Turkey. This guaranteed Russia automatic qualification to the final of the 2004 Contest.

After the contest, Channel One Russia complained that Irish broadcaster RTÉ had used a back-up jury, and that it had cost them victory. A statement by Channel One said "Considering [the] insignificant difference in points between the first and third places, there are grounds to believe that the contest results could be much different for Russia." RTÉ responded by publishing the unused results of the Irish televote, which showed that had the jury not been used, Turkey would still have won and Russia would have finished in second place.

=== Voting ===
The voting spokesperson for Russia was Yana Churikova.

Points awarded to Russia
Score	Country
12 points	Croatia; Estonia; Latvia; Slovenia; Ukraine
10 points	Cyprus; Greece; Israel; Turkey
8 points	Austria; Germany
7 points	Belgium; France; Romania
6 points	Spain
5 points	
4 points	Iceland; Poland; Portugal
3 points	Bosnia and Herzegovina
2 points	Norway; Sweden
1 point	Malta; Netherlands

Points awarded by Russia
Score	Country
12 points	Romania
10 points	Netherlands
8 points	Ukraine
7 points	Germany
6 points	Spain
5 points	Israel
4 points	Norway
3 points	Belgium
2 points	Estonia
1 point	Greece
