= Claudia Beni =

Croatian pop singer, born in Opatija

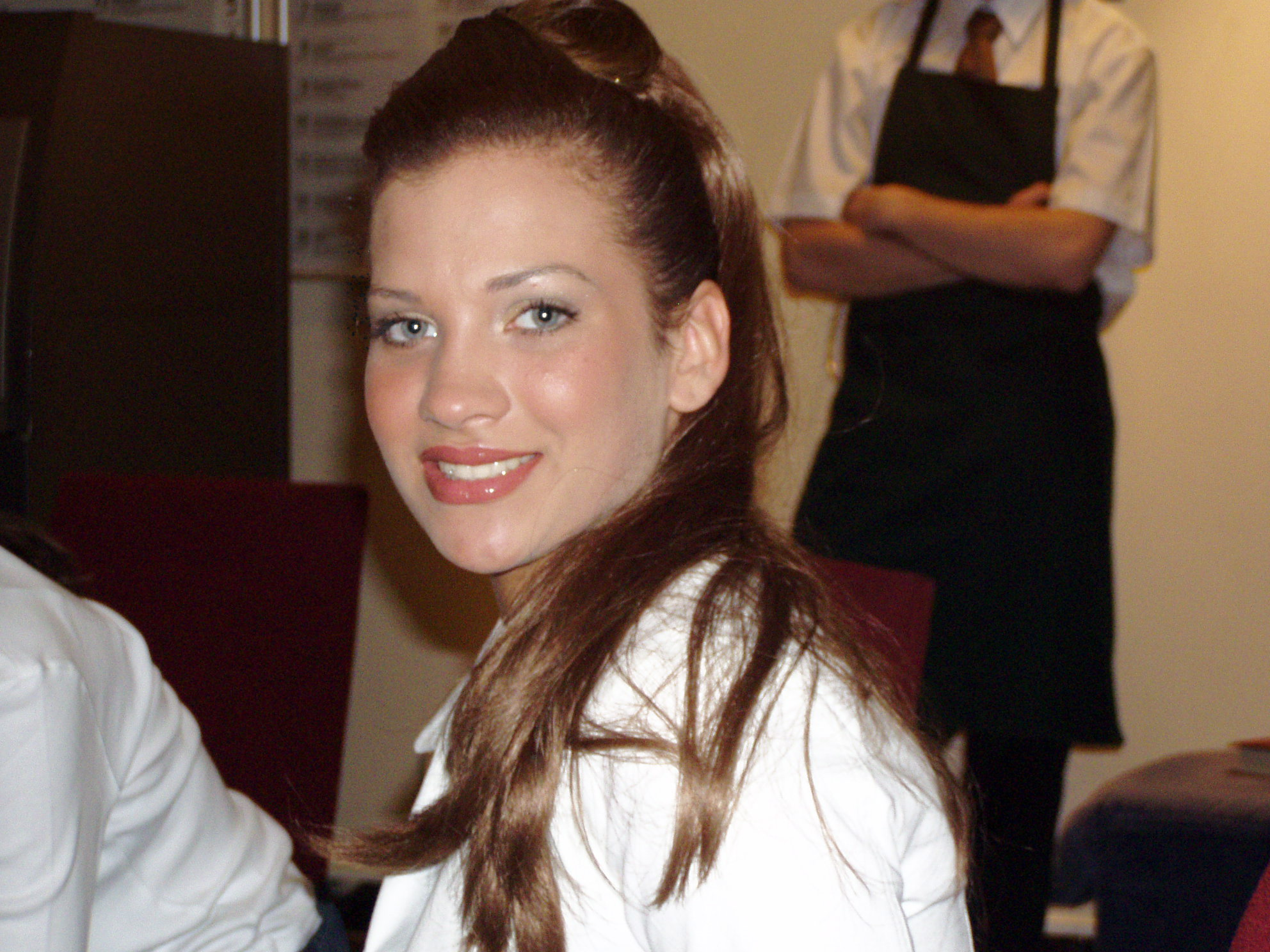
- Beni in 2003

Background information
- Born: Claudia Beni; 30 May 1986 (age 40); Opatija, SR Croatia, Yugoslavia
- Origin: Croatia
- Genres: Pop, Baby pop
- Occupation: Singer
- Years active: 2003–2008; 2013–2015

Claudia Beni (born 30 May 1986) is a Croatian pop singer, born in Opatija.

== Biography ==
At the time when she first participated in Dora, the national finals for the Eurovision Song Contest, Claudia was only 12, but she was already an experienced band singer having performed all over Croatia, Bosnia and Herzegovina, Slovenia and Montenegro with the Teens - formerly known as Mići rokeri (Little Rockers).

After receiving the 2002 Porin prize, Claudia broke away from the Teens. Her first 12-song solo album “Claudia” was released just before the summer of 2002. The singles “Tako hrabar da me ostaviš” (Brave Enough To Leave Me) (one of the songs in the Best New Album awarded at the Split Festival 2001), “Ili ona ili ja” (Either Her or Me) (Zagrebfest 2001), and “Led” (Ice) (HRF 2002) gave Claudia further notability in the national music industry.

In 2003, Claudia won the Dora 2003 with the song "Više nisam tvoja", and thus gaining the right to represent Croatia at the Eurovision Song Contest 2003 in Latvia. At Eurovision in Latvia, she finished in 15th place.

Claudia has also worked together with another member of the Croatian pop scene, Ivana Banfić, singing the song “Hrvatice vas vole” (Croatian Women Love You), dedicated to the national football team during the World Cup in Japan which enjoyed no success.

She returned to Dora in 2006, singing "Samo ti mi ostani".

She retired from the music industry in 2008. She briefly returned to singing in 2013 as a part of the band Koktelsi, but retired again in 2015.

== Discography ==
=== Albums ===
1. "Claudia", released 2002
2. "Čista kao suza", released 2004

Preceded by Vesna Pisarović with "Everything I Want"	Croatia in the Eurovision Song Contest; 2003	Succeeded by Ivan Mikulić with "You Are The Only One"
