= Never Let You Go (Mando song) =

2003 song by Mando

Single by Mando
- Released: April 2003 (Greece)
- Genre: Pop
- Length: 4:17
- Label: Alpha
- Composer: Adamantia Stamatopoulou
- Lyricist: Teri Siganos
- Producer: Johnny Jam

Mando singles chronology
"Ligo Ligo" (2002)	"Never Let You Go" (2003)	"Dos Mou Logo Na Sotho" (2008)

Music video
- "Never Let You Go" on YouTube

Eurovision Song Contest 2003 entry
- Country: Greece
- Artist: Adamantia Stamatopoulou
- As: Mando
- Language: English
- Composer: Adamantia Stamatopoulou
- Lyricist: Teri Siganos

Finals performance
- Final result: 17th
- Final points: 25

Entry chronology
- ◄ "S.A.G.A.P.O." (2002)
- "Shake It" (2004) ►

"Never Let You Go" is a song recorded by Greek singer Mando, with music composed by herself, lyrics written by Teri Siganos, and produced by Johnny Jam. It represented Greece in the Eurovision Song Contest 2003, held in Riga. It was the first entry from Greece in the contest that did not feature any Greek lyrics.

== Background ==
=== Conception ===
"Never Let You Go" was composed by Mando, with lyrics by Teri Siganos, and was produced by Johnny Jam. It is a dramatic ballad, with the singer telling her lover all the things she would do for him, but emphasising that she would "never let [him] go". In addition to the version fully in English, Mando recorded a version with English and Greek lyrics.

=== Eurovision ===
On 26 February 2003, "Never Let You Go" sang by Mando competed in Ena tragoudi gia tin Evropi, the national final that the Hellenic Broadcasting Corporation (ERT) organized to select its song and performer for the 48th edition of the Eurovision Song Contest. The song won the competition so it became the Greek entry –and Mando the performer– for Eurovision. For the song to participate in the contest, it had to be shortened to fit into three minutes.

On 24 May 2003, the Eurovision Song Contest was held in the Skonto Hall in Riga hosted by Latvian Television (LTV) and broadcast live throughout the continent. Mando performed "Never Let You Go" seventeenth on the evening, following Ukraine's "Hasta la vista" by Oleksandr Ponomariov and preceding Norway's "I'm Not Afraid to Move On" by Jostein Hasselgård. Mando wore an unusual navy blue gown, with a very tight lace-up bodice. The song was the first Greek entry in the contest that did not feature any Greek lyrics as she performed it fully in English.

At the close of voting, it had received 25 points and was placed seventeenth in a field of twenty-six. It was succeeded as Greek entry at the 2004 contest by "Shake It" by Sakis Rouvas.

=== Aftermath ===
In the fifth episode of the first season of Your Face Sounds Familiar aired on 12 May 2013 on ANT1, Mando replicated her performance at Eurovision.

== Track listing ==
1. "Never Let You Go" (Euro Version) - 3:02
2. "Never Let You Go" (Original Version)- 4:19
3. "Never Let You Go" (English/Greek Version)- 4:20
4. "Never Let You Go" (Dance Mix) - 4:22
5. "Never Let You Go" (Extended Club Mix) - 5:54

== Chart performance ==
The song topped the Greek charts and was certified gold in Greece.

=== Weekly charts ===
Chart (2003)	Peak position
Greece (Singles Charts)	1
