= Sven Stojanović =

Serbian film director

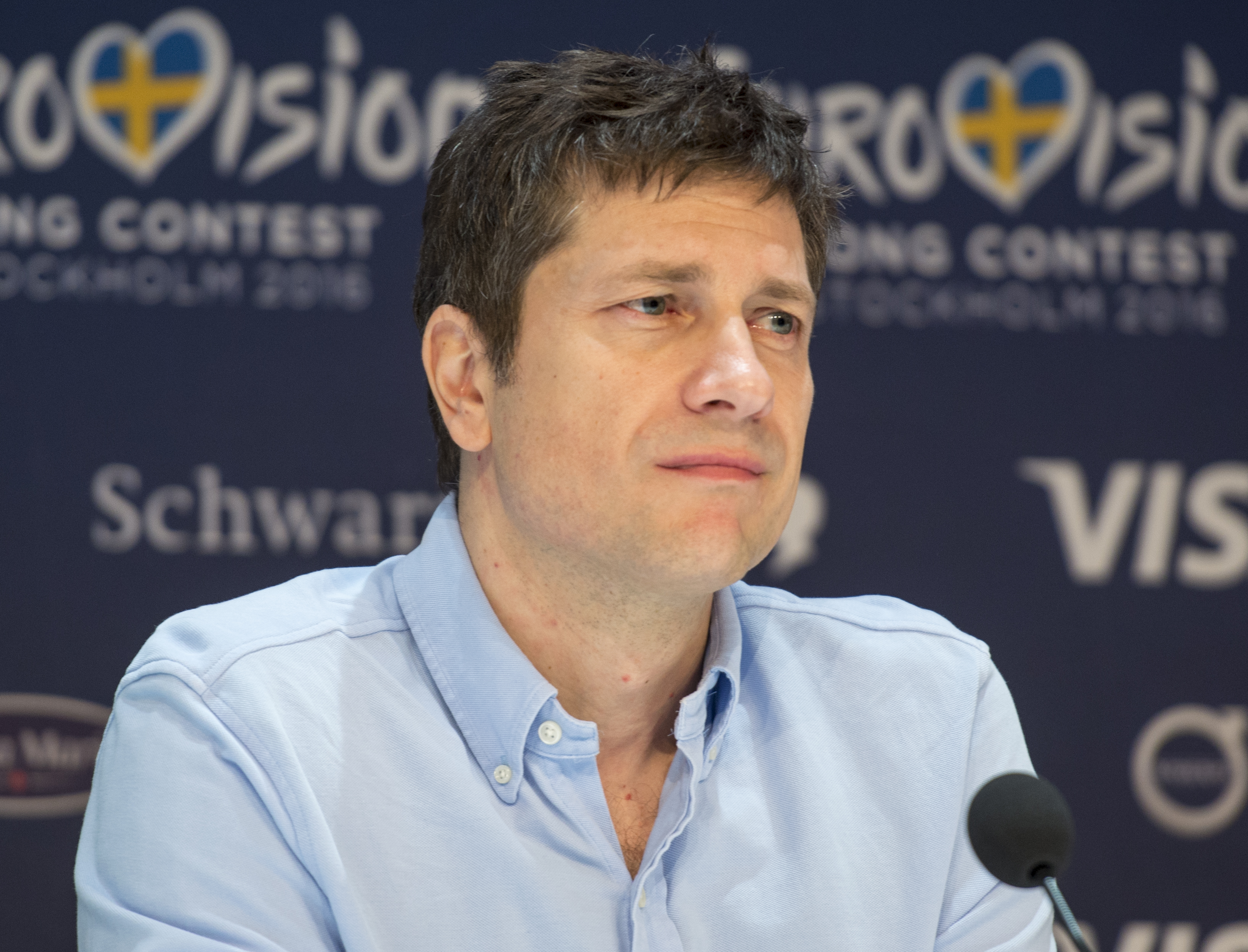
Sven Stojanović, 2016

Sven Nikola Stojanović (Serbian Cyrillic: Свен Никола Стојановић; born 14 November 1969) is a Swedish director of Serb descent mostly involved with Swedish TV productions, notably Melodifestivalen.

Stojanović produced Melodifestivalen 2008, Eurovision Song Contest 2013 and Eurovision Song Contest 2016. He worked as director of the Melodifestivalen 2003, Melodifestivalen 2004, Melodifestivalen 2005 and Melodifestivalen 2006. He has previously directed the Eurovision Song Contest in 2003, 2004, 2005, 2008, Junior Eurovision Song Contest 2009 and also co-produced with Marius Bratten the ESC 2000 when it was held in Stockholm.

He has directed Swedish shows like Fotbollsgalan, Grammis, Guldbagge Awards, and Idrottsgalan (athletic awards), as well as the first ever live HDTV production in Sweden in 2006.
