= Ivan Mikulić =

Herzegovinian Croat singer (born 1968)

- Born: Ivica Ante Mikulić; 8 May 1968 (age 57); Lištica, SR Bosnia and Herzegovina, SFR Yugoslavia
- Origin: Zagreb, Croatia
- Genres: Pop
- Occupation: Singer
- Years active: 2004–present
- Website: ivan-mikulic.com

Ivica Ante "Ivan" Mikulić (born 8 May 1968) is a Herzegovinian Croat singer, best known outside his country for having represented Croatia in the Eurovision Song Contest 2004, singing "You Are The Only One". Mikulić has a large vocal range, which wasn't demonstrated in his performance, and he has incorporated traditional Croatian and Herzegovinian elements in his music such as ganga.

In addition to Eurovision, he has performed in many Croatian music festivals in both Croatia and Bosnia and Herzegovina.

== Achievements ==
- Winner of Melodije Mostara music festival – 2006

== Discography ==
Studio albums 1996 - Zaljubljen i lud 1999 - Kaži joj suzo 2002 - Ti si ona prava 2004 - Kompilacija 2006 - Igraj, igraj, nemoj stat'

== Sources ==
- "Ivan Mikulić". crorec.hr (in Croatian). Croatia Records.

Preceded by Claudia Beni with Više nisam tvoja	Croatia in the Eurovision Song Contest; 2004	Succeeded by Boris Novković with Vukovi umiru sami
