= Eurovision Song Contest 2003 =

International song competition

Coordinates: 56°56′56″N 24°06′23″E

- Magical Rendez-vous

Date and venue
- Final: 24 May 2003
- Venue: Skonto Hall; Riga, Latvia

Organisation
- Organiser: European Broadcasting Union (EBU)
- Scrutineer: Sarah Yuen

Production
- Host broadcaster: Latvian Television (LTV)
- Director: Sven Stojanović
- Executive producer: Brigita Rozenbrika
- Presenters: Marie N; Renārs Kaupers

Participants
- Number of entries: 26
- Debuting countries: Ukraine
- Returning countries: Iceland; Ireland; Netherlands; Norway; Poland; Portugal
- Non-returning countries: Denmark; Finland; Lithuania; Macedonia; Switzerland
- Participation map: Competing countries Relegated countries unable to participate due to poor results in previous contests Countries that participated in the past but not in 2003

Vote
- Voting system: Each country awards 1–8, 10, and 12 points to their ten favourite songs
- Winning song: Turkey; "Everyway That I Can"

The Eurovision Song Contest 2003 was the 48th edition of the Eurovision Song Contest, held on 24 May 2003 at the Skonto Hall in Riga, Latvia, and presented by Marie N and Renārs Kaupers. It was organised by the European Broadcasting Union (EBU) and host broadcaster Latvian Television (LTV), who staged the event after winning the 2002 contest for Latvia with the song "I Wanna" by Marie N. Kaupers had also represented Latvia in 2000 as a member of Brainstorm.

Twenty-six countries participated in the contest, beating the record of twenty-five first set in 1993. It saw the return of Iceland, Ireland, the Netherlands, Norway, and Poland after having been relegated from competing the previous year. Portugal also returned to the contest after being absent the previous year, while Ukraine participated in the contest for the first time. Denmark, Finland, Lithuania, Macedonia, and Switzerland were relegated due to their poor results in 2002.

The winner was Turkey with the song "Everyway That I Can", performed by Sertab Erener who wrote it with Demir Demirkan. This was Turkey's first victory in the contest after 28 years of participation. Belgium, Russia, Norway, and Sweden rounded out the top five. Further down the table, the United Kingdom achieved their worst result to date, finishing twenty-sixth (last place) with no points. However, they avoided relegation due to being one of the "Big Four" countries at the time, as well as relegation being abolished the following year. The host country Latvia placed twenty-fourth (third from last) – this was the first time since 1995 that the host entry did not place in the top 10, and it was, overall, the worst result for a host entry since 1992.

This was the last contest to take place on one evening. The EBU revealed that it would be adding a semi-final show to the competition in order to accommodate the growing number of interested countries wishing to take part in the contest. This was also the last contest in which a relegation system was used to determine which countries would participate in the following year's contest. As the Belgian entry was sung in an imaginary language, this was also the first time the contest featured a song with no parts performed in English or a language native to the country.

== Location ==
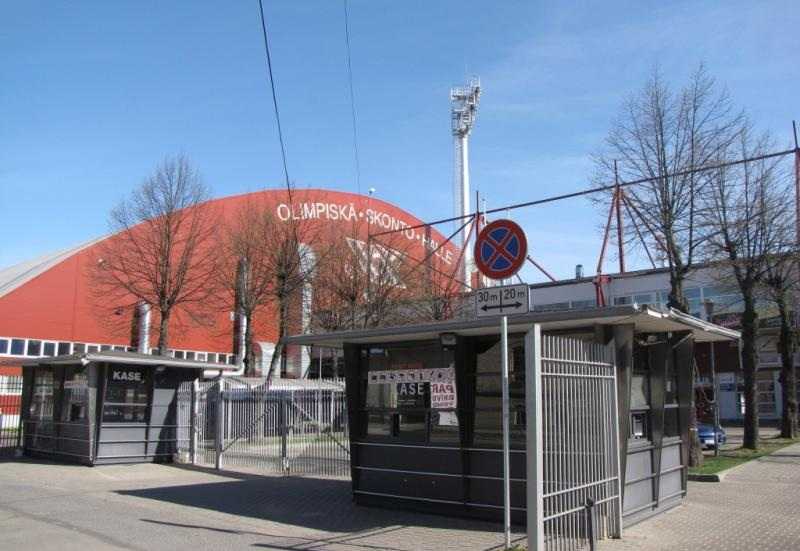
Skonto Hall, Riga – host venue of the 2003 contest.

On 22 August 2002, Latvian public broadcaster Latvian Television (LTV) announced that it had chosen the Skonto Hall in Riga as the host venue for the 2003 contest.

Latvia won the Eurovision Song Contest 2002 on 25 May 2002 in Tallinn, Estonia, with the song “I Wanna” performed by Marie N. This was Latvia's first victory in the contest, which also carried the right for LTV to organise the 2003 contest. LTV initially had budgetary concerns with staging the contest. The chairman of the National Radio and Television Council Ojārs Rubenis stated that if the government presented no budget guarantees, the council, which owns shares in LTV, would vote against organising the contest. Rubenis elaborated that LTV was prepared to cover the creative side and broadcasting of the contest, but additional funds would be needed for infrastructure, hotels and other financial issues.

The Government of Latvia allotted €5.3 million for the event with a further €1.1 million being provided by the Riga City Council – covering the anticipated organisational costs for the contest. A task force that included members from LTV, the National Radio and Television Council, and state secretaries was formed to explicitly work on organisation of the contest and report on the estimated expenses.

=== Bidding phase ===
Locations of the candidate cities: the chosen host city is marked in blue, while the eliminated cities are marked in red.

Three cities were considered as host city of the contest: Riga, Ventspils, and Jūrmala. LTV requested proposals from the three cities concerning how they plan to organise the contest. Riga City Council offered the Mežaparks Open-air Stage, Skonto Hall, and the Ķīpsala International Exhibition Centre as potential venues for hosting the contest. Ventspils bid to host the contest in the halls of the Ventspils Olympic Center with a pledge of support from city mayor Aivars Lembergs, who added that Ventspils could also provide two cruise ferries that could be used to accommodate up to 8,000 guests. Jūrmala City Council offered the Dzintari Concert Hall with plans to expand and upgrade the facility and surrounding infrastructure.

LTV's organisational task force later decided to proceed with the bids from Riga and Ventspils, eliminating Jūrmala and the Mežaparks Open-air Stage in Riga. On 15 June 2002, the European Broadcasting Union (EBU) Reference Group decided in conjunction with the organisational task force in Latvia that Riga would host the 2003 contest with the venue option between the Skonto Hall and Ķīpsala International Exhibition Centre being decided upon by LTV. LTV ultimately chose the Skonto Hall as the venue to stage the contest.

Key † Host venue ‡ Shortlisted

City	Venue
Jūrmala	Dzintari Concert Hall
Riga	Mežaparks Open-air Stage
Riga	Skonto Hall †
Riga	Ķīpsala International Exhibition Centre ‡
Ventspils	Ventspils Olympic Center halls

== Participants ==
Eurovision Song Contest 2003 – Participation summaries by country
- Austria; Belgium; Bosnia and Herzegovina; Croatia; Cyprus; Estonia; France; Germany; Greece; Iceland; Ireland; Israel; Latvia; Malta; Netherlands; Norway; Poland; Portugal; Romania; Russia; Slovenia; Spain; Sweden; Turkey; Ukraine; United Kingdom

Per the rules of the contest, twenty-six countries were allowed to participate in the event, a new record number of competing entries in a single edition. Originally a total of twenty-five countries were scheduled to participate in the event, however Ukraine was added to the line-up shortly before the publication of the competing countries in November 2002, making its début appearance in the contest. Iceland, Ireland, the Netherlands, Norway, Poland, and Portugal returned after being absent from the previous year's event, and competed alongside Ukraine, the "Big Four" largest contributing participating countries – France, Germany, Spain, and the United Kingdom – and the remaining fifteen highest-scoring participating countries from the 2002 contest. Having received the lowest scores in the 2002 contest, Denmark, Finland, Lithuania, Macedonia, and Switzerland were subsequently relegated and were prevented from participating in this year's event.

Twenty-four countries participated in the 2002 contest in Tallinn; of these, fourteen were expected to compete in 2003. The bottom ten in Tallinn would be relegated, to allow countries to compete for the first time. In reality, only five countries were relegated – nineteen countries that entered in 2002 competed in Riga. Originally, Serbia and Montenegro, Albania, and Belarus had planned 2003 debuts, but the EBU's late changes to the relegation procedure meant that they could not compete. The countries eventually made their debuts in 2004.

The 2003 contest was one of the few editions where no lead artists had previously competed as lead artists in past contests, although Slovenian representative Karmen had previously performed as a backing singer to Vili Resnik for Slovenia in 1998.

Eurovision Song Contest 2003 participants
Country	Broadcaster	Artist	Song	Language	Songwriter(s)
Austria	ORF	Alf Poier	"Weil der Mensch zählt"	German (Note: Specifically Styrian, a Southern Bavarian dialect)	Alf Poier
Belgium	RTBF	Urban Trad	"Sanomi"	Imaginary (Note: In a constructed language)	Yves Barbieux
Bosnia and Herzegovina	PBSBiH	Mija Martina	"Ne brini"	Croatian, English	Arjana Kunštek; Ines Prajo
Croatia	HRT	Claudia Beni	"Više nisam tvoja"	Croatian, English	Andrej Babić
Cyprus	CyBC	Stelios Constantas	"Feeling Alive"	English	Stelios Constantas
Estonia	ETV	Ruffus	"Eighties Coming Back"	English	Vaiko Eplik
France	France Télévisions	Louisa Baïleche	"Monts et merveilles"	French	Hocine Hallaf
Germany	NDR (Note: On behalf of the German public broadcasting consortium ARD)	Lou	"Let's Get Happy"	English	Bernd Meinunger; Ralph Siegel
Greece	ERT	Mando	"Never Let You Go"	English	Teri Siganos; Adamantia Stamatopoulou
Iceland	RÚV	Birgitta	"Open Your Heart"	English	Birgitta Haukdal; Hallgrímur Óskarsson; Sveinbjörn I. Baldvinsson
Ireland	RTÉ	Mickey Harte	"We've Got the World"	English	Martin Brannigan; Keith Molloy
Israel	IBA	Lior Narkis	"Words for Love"	Hebrew	Yossi Gispan; Yoni Ro'eh
Latvia	LTV	F.L.Y.	"Hello from Mars"	English	Mārtiņš Freimanis; Lauris Reiniks
Lithuania	LRT	Amberlife	"My Way"	English	Edgaras Lubys
Malta	PBS	Lynn Chircop	"To Dream Again"	English	Cynthia Sammut; Alfred Zammit
Netherlands	NOS	Esther Hart	"One More Night"	English	Alan Michael; Tjeerd van Zanen
Norway	NRK	Jostein Hasselgård	"I'm Not Afraid to Move On"	English	Arve Furset; VJ Strøm
Poland	TVP	Ich Troje	"Keine Grenzen – Żadnych granic"	German, Polish, Russian	André Franke; Joachim Horn-Bernges; Jacek Łągwa; Michał Wiśniewski
Portugal	RTP	Rita Guerra	"Deixa-me sonhar"	Portuguese, English	Paulo Martins
Romania	TVR	Nicola	"Don't Break My Heart"	English	Mihai Alexandru; Nicoleta Alexandru
Russia	C1R	t.A.T.u.	"Ne ver', ne boisia" (Не верь, не бойся)	Russian	Mars Lasar; Valery Polienko
Slovenia	RTVSLO	Karmen	"Nanana"	English	Karmen Stavec; Martin Štibernik
Spain	TVE	Beth	"Dime"	Spanish	Amaya Martínez; Jesús María Pérez
Sweden	SVT	Fame	"Give Me Your Love"	English	Calle Kindbom; Carl Lösnitz
Turkey	TRT	Sertab Erener	"Everyway That I Can"	English	Demir Demirkan; Sertab Erener
Ukraine	NTU	Olexandr	"Hasta la vista"	English	Svika Pick; Mirit Shem Or
United Kingdom	BBC	Jemini	"Cry Baby"	English	Martin Isherwood

== Format ==
The EBU released the rules for the 2003 contest in November 2002, which detailed that twenty-six countries would participate, making it the largest number of participants to take part in the contest up to this point. The rules also modified the eligibility criteria for entries, changing the date of release cut-off point for songs from 1 January 2003 to 1 October 2002. There was also a change in the tie-break rule, which would now resolve such a case in favour of the nation that received points from a higher number of countries rather than taking into account the number of top scores (12 points) received. The draw for running order was held on 29 November 2002 in Riga, hosted by Marie N and Renārs Kaupers, with the results being revealed during a delayed broadcast of the proceedings later that day.

The official sponsors for the contest were Latvian mobile telecom provider Latvijas Mobilais Telefons and Latvian bank company Parex Banka. LTV selected Latvia Tours as its official partner to provide lodging, travel and recreation for the contest delegations and other guests. Riga City Council was also responsible for offering promotion and activities during the week preceding the contest.

Full preparations for the 2003 contest began on 18 May 2003 at the Skonto Hall. There were rehearsals, press conferences and participants were also involved in an internet chat. Two dress rehearsals were held on 23 May, in front of an estimated 12,000 people. The organisers of the contest held a press conference; one of the issues complained about was the lack of invitations for the after-party. The final dress rehearsal was held on 24 May, the day of the contest. A simulation of the voting procedure was also held, in which the presenters linked up with all twenty-six countries by satellite for the first time.

On the day of the contest, bookmaker William Hill's odds placed Russia as joint favourites to win the contest with Spain. Ireland, Slovenia, Estonia, Norway and Iceland were behind in third, fourth and joint fifth respectively. At the conclusion of the contest, favourites Russia placed third and Spain placed eighth, while outsiders Turkey (20–1) and Belgium (50–1) claimed the first and second places, respectively. Austria, at 100–1, were favourites to finish last, however, they scored their best result since 1989, placing sixth.

An official compilation album, featuring all twenty-six competing entries from the contest, was released for the first time on the EMI/CMC label.

=== Graphic design ===
The design of the contest was built around the theme "Magical rendez-vous", which represented the meeting of the various European nations coming to Latvia and encountering Latvia's versatile landscapes. LTV launched a competition in order to find the logo for the contest. At the close of the competition, high interest from the public translated into 204 logo submissions, which were ultimately judged by a jury panel consisting of Uldis-Ivars Grava (general director of LTV), Arvīds Babris (then executive producer of the contest), Ugis Brikmanis (director), Laimonis Šteinbergs (artist), Ingūna Rībena (architect), Arta Giga (LTV representative) and Juhan Paadam (EBU representative). On 16 November 2002, LTV and the EBU presented the logo for the contest which was designed by the director of the Computer Graphics Department of LTV, Maris Kalve with further elaboration by LTV's chief artist Kristaps Skulte. The logo was named upes, the Latvian word for rivers, and carried the slogan "All rivers flow toward the sea, all songs flow toward the Eurovision Song Contest".

The postcards shown between the entries were directed by Ugis Brikmanis and featured the artists competing at the contest interacting with Latvia's various landscapes: forests, rivers, lakes and towns. The postcards were recorded during the preceding week of the contest and ran behind schedule, leading to some postcards featuring only footage from the rehearsals and press conferences.

The stage design was created by Aigars Ozoliņš and based on the concept "Planet Latvia". The stage used several light and video effects and included an innovation new to the contest – a video screen stage floor that could be used to give each entry a unique look. The green room where the delegations and competitors awaited the results of the contest was placed directly behind the stage and unveiled shortly before the voting portion of the show commenced, allowing the audience to see the representatives of the competing nations as they received points. For the first time, the scoreboard automatically rearranged itself in descending order as each point was awarded, making it easier for the audience and television viewers to follow the exact progress of the competitors throughout the voting process.

=== National host broadcaster ===
Initially, Arvīds Babris, head of the Latvian delegation at the 2002 contest, was appointed as executive producer for the contest, however, after production fell behind schedule and the EBU applied pressure upon LTV, he was dismissed and Brigita Rozenbrika took over the position, receiving additional support from the Swedish broadcaster Sveriges Television (SVT) and Estonian broadcaster Eesti Televisioon (ETV). SVT was also the technical producer of the contest for the second year running with Sven Stojanović as director and the Swedish lighting company Spectra+ contracted for the contest.

=== Voting system ===
The EBU reintroduced televoting as an obligatory voting mode in all participating countries, which awarded 1, 2, 3, 4, 5, 6, 7, 8, 10 and 12 points to their ten favourite songs, in ascending order. Countries voted in the same order as they had performed. Bosnia and Herzegovina and Russia were granted an exception to holding a televote as they cited that their telecommunications penetration was less than 80%. Polish broadcaster Telewizja Polska opted to use only SMS-voting. In televoting and SMS voting, a household shall not be permitted to vote more than three times. All other participating broadcasters planned to use a televote. Due to a technical issue, Ireland used results from their back-up jury instead of televoting. This contest was also the first to introduce a computer-generated scoreboard which rearranged itself in order as the points were awarded. Participating broadcasters were required to assemble back-up juries that consisted of eight voting members, with age and gender equally distributed, in the case of televote failure on the night of the competition. Four members of the jury had to be members of the general public and the other four members had to be music professionals.

=== Future changes in contest format ===
With the increased number of potential participating countries, the EBU began to review the format of the contest with potential changes being considered such as adding extra evenings for the show, holding a regional pre-selection, or putting a limit to number of participating countries by increasing the entrance fee. On 29 January 2003, the EBU unveiled a two-night system for the contest in 2004: a semi-final would be held before a grand final. The "Big Four", along with the top ten from the 2003 contest, would automatically qualify for the 2004 final. The format change eliminated the relegation system, allowing all countries to send an artist and song to the contest. The fourteen eventual countries from the 2003 contest that qualified to compete directly in the 2004 final were Turkey, Belgium, Russia, Norway, Sweden, Austria, Poland, Spain, Iceland, Romania, Ireland, Germany, France, and the United Kingdom. All other countries would have to compete in the semi-final for ten remaining spots in the final.

== Contest overview ==
The contest was held on 24 May 2003 at 22:00 EEST (21:00 CEST) and was won by Turkey.

The contest featured special guests that communicated with the hosts via satellite: Lys Assia, winner of the 1956 contest greeted the hosts and spectators from Nicosia, Elton John spoke to the presenters live from the Life Ball in Vienna and one astronaut and one cosmonaut—Ed Lu and Yuri Malenchenko—gave their greetings from the International Space Station. The interval act for the contest was a short film directed by Anna Viduleja that featured a sequence of performances by Latvian post-folklore group Iļģi, Renārs Kaupers' band Brainstorm, Marie N and piano player Raimonds Pauls.

Turkey won with 167 points. Belgium came second with 165 points, with Russia, Norway, Sweden, Austria, Poland, Iceland, Spain and Romania completing the top ten. Portugal, Slovenia, Latvia, Malta and United Kingdom occupied the bottom five positions.

The UK's result was their worst-ever at Eurovision; by contrast, Turkey's win was their first. Alf Poier's sixth place was Austria's best result for fourteen years, Poland's seventh place was their best in nine, and Romania's tenth place was one place behind their best-ever. Belgium's second place was their first top-five finish in seventeen years, while Spain's eighth place (tied with Iceland's, which had its best result since 1999) was their third top-ten finish in a row, but Latvia's third-from-bottom finish was their worst result in four attempts; it was also the worst placing for a host country since 1992, until 2015 when host country Austria received 'nul points' and came second to last (Germany also received 'nul points' but because of the running order Austria placed ahead of them).

Winner

Results of the Eurovision Song Contest 2003
R/O	Country	Artist	Song	Points	Place
1	Iceland	Birgitta	"Open Your Heart"	81	8
2	Austria	Alf Poier	"Weil der Mensch zählt"	101	6
3	Ireland	Mickey Harte	"We've Got the World"	53	11
4	Turkey	Sertab Erener	"Everyway That I Can"	167	1
5	Malta	Lynn Chircop	"To Dream Again"	4	25
6	Bosnia and Herzegovina	Mija Martina	"Ne brini"	27	16
7	Portugal	Rita Guerra	"Deixa-me sonhar"	13	22
8	Croatia	Claudia Beni	"Više nisam tvoja"	29	15
9	Cyprus	Stelios Constantas	"Feeling Alive"	15	20
10	Germany	Lou	"Let's Get Happy"	53	11
11	Russia	t.A.T.u.	"Ne ver', ne boisia"	164	3
12	Spain	Beth	"Dime"	81	8
13	Israel	Lior Narkis	"Words for Love"	17	19
14	Netherlands	Esther Hart	"One More Night"	45	13
15	United Kingdom	Jemini	"Cry Baby"	0	26
16	Ukraine	Olexandr	"Hasta la vista"	30	14
17	Greece	Mando	"Never Let You Go"	25	17
18	Norway	Jostein Hasselgård	"I'm Not Afraid to Move On"	123	4
19	France	Louisa Baïleche	"Monts et merveilles"	19	18
20	Poland	Ich Troje	"Keine Grenzen – Żadnych granic"	90	7
21	Latvia	F.L.Y.	"Hello from Mars"	5	24
22	Belgium	Urban Trad	"Sanomi"	165	2
23	Estonia	Ruffus	"Eighties Coming Back"	14	21
24	Romania	Nicola	"Don't Break My Heart"	73	10
25	Sweden	Fame	"Give Me Your Love"	107	5
26	Slovenia	Karmen	"Nanana"	7	23

=== Spokespersons ===
Each participating broadcaster appointed a spokesperson who was responsible for announcing, in English or French, the votes for its respective country. The voting order in the 2003 contest was the order in which the countries had been drawn to perform. The spokespersons for each country were:

1. Iceland – Eva María Jónsdóttir
2. Austria – Dodo Roscic
3. Ireland – Pamela Flood
4. Turkey – Meltem Ersan Yazgan
5. Malta – Sharon Borg
6. Bosnia and Herzegovina – Ana Vilenica
7. Portugal – Helena Ramos
8. Croatia – Davor Meštrović
9. Cyprus – Loukas Hamatsos
10. Germany – Axel Bulthaupt
11. Russia – Yana Churikova
12. Spain – Anne Igartiburu
13. Israel – Michal Zo'aretz
14. Netherlands – Marlayne
15. United Kingdom – Lorraine Kelly
16. Ukraine – Lyudmyla Hariv
17. Greece – Alexis Kostalas
18. Norway – Roald Øyen
19. France – Sandrine François
20. Poland – Maciej Orłoś
21. Latvia – Ģirts Līcis
22. Belgium – Corinne Boulangier
23. Estonia – Ines
24. Romania – Leonard Miron
25. Sweden – Kattis Ahlström
26. Slovenia – Peter Poles

== Detailed voting results ==
Detailed voting results of the Eurovision Song Contest 2003
Voting procedure used: 100% televoting 100% jury vote		Total score	Iceland	Austria	Ireland	Turkey	Malta	Bosnia and Herzegovina	Portugal	Croatia	Cyprus	Germany	Russia	Spain	Israel	Netherlands	United Kingdom	Ukraine	Greece	Norway	France	Poland	Latvia	Belgium	Estonia	Romania	Sweden	Slovenia
Contestants	Iceland	81			7	8	12			6	5	1				6		4		12	1	1	3	3	1		7	4
Contestants	Austria	101	10			6		5	10	5	4	2		8		8	8		2	8			4	2	6		6	7
Contestants	Ireland	53	2			5	5		7	4	7						12	1		6			1	1				2
Contestants	Turkey	167	3	12			4	12	8	10	8	10		3	7	12	7	2	7	10	10	2		12		10	8	10
Contestants	Malta	4			3				1																			
Contestants	Bosnia and Herzegovina	27		7		12				8																		
Contestants	Portugal	13			2									2				3			6							
Contestants	Croatia	29		5	6	3		6											1									8
Contestants	Cyprus	15					2								1				12									
Contestants	Germany	53	8	1	4		3						7	4		2	4					5	2		2	1	10	
Contestants	Russia	164	4	8		10	1	3	4	12	10	8		6	10	1		12	10	2	7	4	12	7	12	7	2	12
Contestants	Spain	81	6			2			12	7	6		6		12	5			5					10		5	4	1
Contestants	Israel	17											5	1					3		8							
Contestants	Netherlands	45			5		7	2					10		2		1			5				8			5	
Contestants	United Kingdom	0																										
Contestants	Ukraine	30											8		4							10	5		3			
Contestants	Greece	25			1	4					12	5	1													2		
Contestants	Norway	123	12	2	12		6		5			7	4		3	7	6	7			3	6	7	6	10	3	12	5
Contestants	France	19						8	2													3				6		
Contestants	Poland	90		10			10					12		5		4	2	8	6	4	5		8	5	4	4	3	
Contestants	Latvia	5																							5			
Contestants	Belgium	165	7	4	10	7		10	6		3	6	3	12	8	10	5	10	8	3	12	12	10		8	8		3
Contestants	Estonia	14	1		8								2				3											
Contestants	Romania	73		6		1		7		1	2	4	12	10	6			6	4	1	4	8					1	
Contestants	Sweden	107	5	3			8	1	3	2	1	3		7	5	3	10	5		7	2	7	6	4	7	12		6
Contestants	Slovenia	7						4		3																		

=== 12 points ===
Below is a summary of all 12 points in the final:

N.	Contestant	Nation(s) giving 12 points
5	Russia	Croatia, Estonia, Latvia, Slovenia, Ukraine
4	Turkey	Austria, Belgium, Bosnia and Herzegovina, Netherlands
3	Norway	Iceland, Ireland, Sweden
3	Belgium	France, Poland, Spain
2	Iceland	Malta, Norway
2	Spain	Israel, Portugal
1	Bosnia and Herzegovina	Turkey
1	Cyprus	Greece
1	Greece	Cyprus
1	Ireland	United Kingdom
1	Poland	Germany
1	Romania	Russia
1	Sweden	Romania

== Broadcasts ==
Each participating broadcaster was required to relay live and in full the contest via television. Non-participating EBU member broadcasters were also able to relay the contest as "passive participants"; any passive countries wishing to participate in the following year's event were also required to provide a live broadcast of the contest or a deferred broadcast within 24 hours. Broadcasters were able to send commentators to provide coverage of the contest in their own native language and to relay information about the artists and songs to their viewers. Known details on the broadcasts in each country, including the specific broadcasting stations and commentators, are shown in the tables below. Broadcasters in 42 countries were reported to have broadcast the event live or deferred, including broadcasters in Albania, Armenia, Australia, Belarus, Puerto Rico, Serbia and Montenegro, and the United States.

Broadcasters and commentators in participating countries
Country	Broadcaster	Channel(s)	Commentator(s)	Ref(s)
Austria	ORF	ORF 1	Andi Knoll	
Belgium	RTBF	La Une (Note: Additional live broadcast on RTBF Sat)	Jean-Pierre Hautier	
Belgium	VRT	TV1	André Vermeulen and Anja Daems	
Croatia	HRT	HRT 1	Daniela Trbović	
Cyprus	CyBC	RIK Ena		
Estonia	ETV		Marko Reikop	
France	France Télévisions	France 3	Laurent Ruquier and Isabelle Mergault	
Germany	ARD	Das Erste	Peter Urban	
Greece	ERT	ET1	Dafni Bokota	
Greece	ERT	ERA 1	Nikos Triboulidis	
Iceland	RÚV	Sjónvarpið	Gísli Marteinn Baldursson	
Iceland	RÚV	Rás 2		
Ireland	RTÉ	RTÉ One	Marty Whelan and Phil Coulter	
Latvia	LTV	LTV1	Kārlis Streips	
Malta	PBS	TVM	John Bundy	
Netherlands	NOS	Nederland 2	Willem van Beusekom	
Netherlands	Radio 2		Hijlco Span and Ron Stoeltie	
Norway	NRK	NRK1	Jostein Pedersen	
Norway	NRK	NRK P1		
Poland	TVP	TVP1	Artur Orzech	
Portugal	RTP	RTP1	Margarida Mercês de Melo	
Romania	TVR	România 1		
Russia	Channel One	Channel One (Note: Also broadcast deferred via the Orbita satellite broadcasting system in the Russian Far East)	Yuriy Aksyuta and Yelena Batinova	
Slovenia	RTVSLO	SLO 2	Andrea F	
Spain	TVE	La Primera (Note: Additional live broadcast on TVE Internacional)	José Luis Uribarri	
Sweden	SVT	SVT1	Pekka Heino	
Sweden	SR	SR P4	Carolina Norén and Björn Kjellman	
Turkey	TRT	TRT 1 (Note: Additional live broadcast on TRT Int)	Bülend Özveren	
Ukraine	NTU	Pershyi Natsionalnyi	Dmytro Kryzhanivskyi	
United Kingdom	BBC	BBC One (Note: Additional live broadcast on BBC Prime)	Terry Wogan	
United Kingdom	BBC	BBC Radio 2	Ken Bruce	

Broadcasters and commentators in non-participating countries
Country	Broadcaster	Channel(s)	Commentator(s)	Ref(s)
Andorra	RTVA	ATV	Meri Picart and Albert Roig	
Australia	SBS	SBS TV (Note: Deferred broadcast on 25 May at 20:30 (AEST))	Des Mangan	
Belarus	BTRC	Belarus-1	Ales Kruglyakov and Tatyana Yakusheva	
Denmark	DR	DR1	Jørgen de Mylius	
Falkland Islands	BFBS	BFBS 1, (Note: Deferred broadcast at 21:00 (FKT)) BFBS Radio 2		
Finland	YLE	YLE TV2	Maria Guzenina and Asko Murtomäki	
Finland	YLE	YLE FST	Thomas Lundin	
Finland	YLE	YLE Radio Suomi		
Finland	YLE	YLE Radio Vega		
Italy	GAY.tv		Fabio Canino and Paolo Quilici	
Lithuania	LRT	LTV	Darius Užkuraitis	
Serbia and Montenegro	RTS	RTS 2		
Switzerland	SRG SSR	SF 2	Roman Kilchsperger	
Switzerland	SRG SSR	TSR 1	Jean-Marc Richard and Alain Morisod	
Switzerland	SRG SSR	TSI 1	Daniele Rauseo	

== Incidents ==
=== Organisational issues ===
In January 2003, German news magazine Der Spiegel reported that Riga was suffering from serious financial problems that could have led to a breach of contract and the contest needing to be moved to another city. Ilona Bērziņa, spokesperson of LTV, denied that potential financial issues the city council of Riga may be facing would interrupt the organisation of the contest. In February 2003, The Baltic Times reported that a Riga municipality committee rejected the proposal to withdraw the funds it pledged in support of organising the contest.

In March 2003, Danish newspaper B.T. published an article based on accusations that the EBU television director Bjørn Erichsen made in reference to LTV suffering from organisational chaos which could have resulted in the removal of Latvia's hosting duties since they were running behind schedule. The general director of LTV, Uldis-Ivars Grava, replied, saying: "A few weeks ago, the EBU's legal director, Werner Rumphorst, was in Riga, and I spent an entire day with him and with the former general director of the Danish broadcaster DR, Bjørn Erichsen. We talked about co-operation and about programme exchanges, and neither of them said a single word that would indicate any doubts, lack of trust or accusation." Ingrida Smite, head of press for the Eurovision Song Contest 2003, reaffirmed that the contest would take place in Riga despite reports to the contrary.

=== Controversies surrounding Russian band t.A.T.u. ===
Upon the selection of the Russian artists t.A.T.u., the duo gave an interview to German tabloid Bild in March 2003 where they claimed that they would win the contest without a doubt and criticised the German entrant Lou calling her a witch with duo member Julia Volkova (also referring to Germany's 2002 entrant) stating, "In Russia we nurse blind and old people, but we don't send them to the Grand Prix. This must be different in Germany." Lou later responded to the comments stating, "I don't know whether bitching, fighting and boozing kids are the right representatives for such a beautiful country as Russia."

t.A.T.u.'s first rehearsal dominated proceedings on 20 May—the band were supposed to rehearse the day before, but had turned up a day late, claiming that Julia Volkova was suffering from a sore throat. The group were booed by journalists during their press conference where they complained about the production's poor lighting and stage. EBU supervisor Sarah Yuen said "They are the bad girls of pop… we shouldn’t have expected them to come here and be nice and pleasant." The EBU had originally planned to have a pre-recorded performance of the Russian entry ready to substitute during the live broadcast in case the duo performed a lesbian publicity stunt on stage, which they deemed inappropriate for a family entertainment show. The EBU later stated that the performance would be broadcast live without any interruption.

=== Ireland's use of its back-up jury ===
After the contest, Russian broadcaster Channel One complained that Irish broadcaster RTÉ had used a back-up jury, and that it had cost them victory. A statement by Channel One said "Considering [the] insignificant difference in points between the first and third places, there are grounds to believe that the contest results could be much different for Russia." On the night of the competition, the voting polls operated by Irish telecommunications company Eircom suffered a delay in delivering the results on time, which prompted RTÉ to use the votes of the back-up jury instead. The EBU cleared RTÉ of any potential wrongdoing after an investigation on the matter and stated that the rules concerning substituting the back-up jury in place of the televote were correctly applied. RTÉ later published the unused results of the televote, which showed that had the jury not been used, Turkey would still have won, and Ireland's voting "partners", the United Kingdom, would still have no points. Russia did not receive any points from the televote, however, since Belgium only received 2 points from the Irish televote as opposed to 10 points awarded by the Irish jury, Russia would have placed second.

== Marcel Bezençon Awards ==
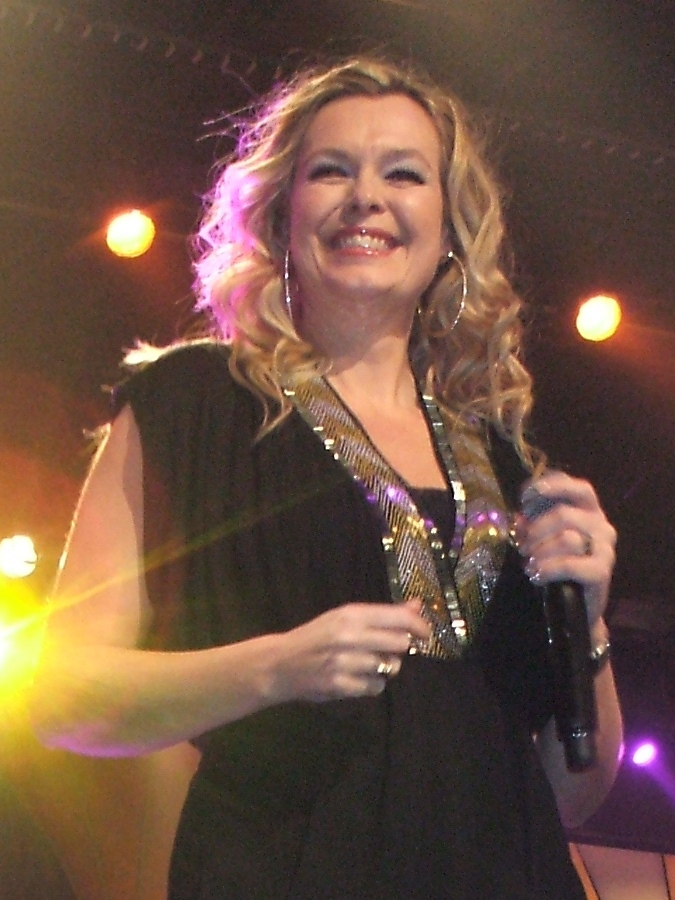
Esther Hart, the Netherlands's representative and winner of the 2003 Marcel Bezençon Awards' Artistic Award

The Marcel Bezençon Awards, a series of awards held concurrently to the main contest, honour and celebrate the participants of the final of that year's Eurovision Song Contest. Named after one of the people influential in the creation of the contest, and created by two former Swedish Eurovision participants, Christer Björkman (1992) and Richard Herrey (1984 as a member of the winning group Herreys), the inaugural awards were presented at part of the 2002 event. Three awards were presented as part of the second edition of the awards in 2003, with the winner of each award determined by the collective votes of a different group of individuals:

- The Press Award for the best competing song, as determined by the accredited press and media, was awarded to the Turkish entry, "Everyway That I Can" performed by Sertab Erener
- The Artistic Award for the best artistic performance, as determined by previous Eurovision winners, was awarded to the Dutch entry, "One More Night" performed by Esther Hart
- The Fan Award, as determined by members of the international Eurovision fan club OGAE, was awarded to the Spanish entry, "Dime" performed by Beth

The winners each received a hand-blown glass trophy designed by Karin Hammar and created at the Stockholm Glass Studio, which were handed out backstage prior to the contest proper.

== Official album ==
Cover art of the official album

Eurovision Song Contest: Riga 2003 was the official compilation album of the 2003 contest, put together by the European Broadcasting Union and released by CMC International on 19 May 2003. The album featured all 26 songs that entered in the 2003 contest.

=== Charts ===
Chart (2003)	Peak position
German Compilation Albums (Offizielle Top 100)	3
