= Ireland in the Eurovision Song Contest 2003 =

- Eurovision Song Contest 2003
- Participating broadcaster: Radio Telefís Éireann (RTÉ)
- Country: Ireland
- Selection process: You're a Star
- Selection date: 16 March 2003

Competing entry
- Song: "We've Got the World"
- Artist: Mickey Harte
- Songwriters: Martin Brannigan; Keith Molloy

Placement
- Final result: 11th, 53 points

Participation chronology

Ireland was represented at the Eurovision Song Contest 2003 with the song "We've Got the World", written by Martin Brannigan and Keith Molloy, and performed by Mickey Harte. The Irish participating broadcaster, Radio Telefís Éireann (RTÉ), organised the competition You're a Star in order to select its entry for the contest. The broadcaster returned to the contest after a one-year absence following their relegation in 2002 as one of the bottom six entrants in 2001. The competition consisted of 20 shows and concluded with a final, resulting in the selection of "We've Got the World" performed by Mickey Joe Harte as the Irish Eurovision entry after facing a public televote.

Ireland competed in the Eurovision Song Contest which took place on 24 May 2003. Performing during the show in position 3, Ireland placed eleventh out of the 26 participating countries, scoring 53 points.

== Background ==
Prior to the 2003 contest, Radio Éireann (RÉ) until 1966, and Radio Telefís Éireann (RTÉ) since 1967, had participated in the Eurovision Song Contest representing Ireland thirty-six times since RÉ's first entry in 1965. They have won the contest a record seven times in total. Their first win came in 1970, with "All Kinds of Everything" performed by Dana. Ireland holds the record for being the only country to win the contest three times in a row (in 1992, 1993, and 1994), as well as having the only three-time winner (Johnny Logan, who won in 1980 as a singer, 1987 as a singer-songwriter, and again in 1992 as a songwriter). In 2001, "Without Your Love" performed by Gary O'Shaughnessy placed twenty-first.

As part of its duties as participating broadcaster, RTÉ organises the selection of its entry in the Eurovision Song Contest and broadcasts the event in the country. The broadcaster has consistently used a national final procedure to choose its entry at the contest, with several artists and songs being featured. RTÉ confirmed its intentions to participate at the 2003 contest on 2 September 2002. For the 2003 contest, the broadcaster announced alongside its participation that both the song and performer for the contest would be selected via the talent contest You're a Star.

== Before Eurovision ==
=== You're a Star ===
RTÉ selected its entry for the Eurovision Song Contest 2003 through the first season of the music competition series You're a Star, which was developed by RTÉ and co-produced with ShinAwil Productions. The shows took place in the Mahoney Hall of the Helix in the Dublin City University (DCU), hosted by Ray D'Arcy and featured a judging panel composed of composer and musician Phil Coulter, television personality and former member of Atomic Kitten Kerry Katona, music publicist Darren Smith and music manager Louis Walsh. The competition consisted of 20 shows, which commenced on 3 November 2002 and concluded on 8 March 2003. All shows in the competition were broadcast on RTÉ One.

The competition took place over two phases. The first phase involved over 5,000 candidates attending auditions held across Ireland in Dún Laoghaire, Belfast, Dundalk, Cork, Killarney, Kilkenny, Galway, Derry, and South Dublin. The first ten shows showcased the auditions and selected a total of 13 contestants to go forward to the next stage in the competition. Nine of the contestants were selected following a public televote (one per audition city) with the remaining four selected by the judging panel (one per judge). The second phase was the ten live shows where the results of all shows were determined solely by a public televote; the judging panel participated in an advisory role only. Following the seventh show, the four contestants remaining in the competition were matched with a potential Eurovision Song Contest song selected by two of the competition judges Phil Coulter and Louis Walsh from entries received through established composers approached by RTÉ. The public televote that took place in both phases was conducted through telephone and SMS.

Competing songs
Song	Songwriter(s)
"A Better Plan"	Brian McFadden
"I Couldn't Love You More"	Ronan Keating, Callum MacColl, Brian Kennedy
"I'll Still Be Right Here"	Louise Wallace
"We've Got the World"	Martin Brannigan, Keith Molloy

==== Results summary ====
Colour key
– Contestant received the most public votes
– Contestant received the fewest public votes and was eliminated

Contestant	Show 1	Show 2	Show 3	Show 4	Show 5	Show 6	Show 7	Show 8	Show 9	Show 10 (Final)
Mickey Harte	—N/a	3rd	2nd	2nd	2nd	1st	2nd	1st	1st	1st
Simon Casey	—N/a	2nd	1st	1st	1st	2nd	1st	2nd	2nd	2nd
Michael Leonard	3rd	—N/a	6th	4th	3rd	5th	4th	3rd	3rd	Eliminated (Show 9)
Lisa Bresnan	1st	—N/a	4th	3rd	4th	3rd	3rd	4th	Eliminated (Show 8)	
Brian Ormond	—N/a	1st	3rd	5th	6th	4th	5th/6th	Eliminated (Show 7)		
Shauna and Caoimhe McElhinney	2nd	—N/a	7th	8th	5th	6th	5th/6th	Eliminated (Show 7)		
Sarah Brophy	4th	—N/a	9th	7th	7th	7th	Eliminated (Show 6)			
Susan McFadden	—N/a	4th	5th	6th	8th	Eliminated (Show 5)				
Joanne Fahy	—N/a	5th	8th	9th	Eliminated (Show 4)					
Azi Jegbefume	6th	—N/a	10th/11th	Eliminated (Show 3)						
Catherine Yore	5th	—N/a	10th/11th	Eliminated (Show 3)						
Susan McGowan	—N/a	6th	Eliminated (Show 2)							
Catriona McGinty	7th	Eliminated (Show 1)								

==== Audition shows ====
Audition Show 1: South Dublin – 3 November 2002
R/O	Artist	Age	From	Song (Original artists)	Result
1	Roisin Cooper	18	Bailieboro, County Cavan	"More Than a Woman" (911)	—N/a
2	Rosemarie Farrell	17	Dunboyne, County Meath	"Angel" (Sarah McLachlan)	—N/a
3	Azi Jegbefume	18	Tallaght, Dublin 24	"My Love is Your Love" (Whitney Houston)	Advanced
4	Niall Whelehan	17	Newbridge, County Kildare	"In My Place" (Coldplay)	—N/a
5	Alan Foran	20	Dundalk, County Louth	"Escape" (Enrique Iglesias)	—N/a
6	Dee Daly	21	Donnycarney, Dublin 5	"A Woman's Worth" (Alicia Keys)	—N/a
7	Joe Kiernan	22	Gorey, County Wexford	"True Companion" (Marc Cohn)	—N/a
8	Brian Pemberton	18	Tallaght, Dublin 24	"Wonderful Tonight" (Eric Clapton)	—N/a

Audition Show 2: Belfast – 10 November 2002
R/O	Artist	Age	From	Song (Original artists)	Result
1	Rachel Hogg	19	Letterkenny, County Donegal	"It Must Have Been Love" (Roxette)	—N/a
2	Michelle Howard	16	Coleraine, County Londonderry	"What Can I Do" (The Corrs)	—N/a
3	Paul Lau	17	Cushendall, County Antrim	"All I Want Is You" (U2)	—N/a
4	Chris Woods	19	Portrush, County Antrim	"Desperado" (Eagles)	—N/a
5	Jill & Dawn Petticrew	Both 25	Belfast	"Take a Chance on Me" (Abba)	—N/a
6	Marion Kelly	18	Moyross, County Limerick	"Wind Beneath My Wings" (Bette Midler)	—N/a
7	Michael Leonard	22	Belcoo, County Fermanagh	"Knockin' on Heaven's Door" (Guns N' Roses)	Advanced
8	Terry Keeley	16	Belfast	"When You Say Nothing at All" (Ronan Keating)	—N/a

Audition Show 3: Dundalk – 17 November 2002
R/O	Artist	Age	From	Song (Original artists)	Result
1	Nicola Cassidy	19	Drogheda, County Louth	"River Deep, Mountain High" (Tina Turner)	—N/a
2	Siobhan McDonnell	16	Dundalk, County Louth	"Songbird" (Eva Cassidy)	—N/a
3	Aoife Blake		Bray, County Wicklow	"Son of a Preacher Man" (Dusty Springfield)	—N/a
4	Sharon O'Hanlon	25	Finglas, County Dublin	"It's All Coming Back to Me Now" (Celine Dion)	—N/a
5	Emma Jenkinson	17	Tandragee, County Armagh	"Walking in Memphis" (Cher)	—N/a
6	Heather Lynas	16	Dundonald, County Down	"Show Me Heaven" (Maria McKee)	—N/a
7	Catherine Yore	17	Kells, County Meath	"(You Make Me Feel Like) A Natural Woman" (Aretha Franklin)	Advanced
8	Julie Cunnane	17	Dundalk, County Louth	"Like a Prayer" (Madonna)	—N/a

Audition Show 4: Cork – 24 November 2002
R/O	Artist	Age	From	Song (Original artists)	Result
1	Serena Lee	16	County Cork	"I Turn to You" (Christina Aguilera)	—N/a
2	Colin Melsop	20	Carrigaline, County Cork	"I Can't Make You Love Me" (George Michael)	—N/a
3	Sarah Brophy	18	Bandon, County Cork	"I Say a Little Prayer" (Aretha Franklin)	Advanced
4	Leonne Mulryan	17	Cork, County Cork	"Fields of Gold" (Eva Cassidy)	—N/a
5	Greg Ryan	18	Prospect, County Limerick	"Flying Without Wings" (Westlife)	—N/a
6	Donna Keohan	18	County Waterford	"How Do I Live" (LeAnn Rimes)	—N/a
7	Rebecca O'Connor	27	Cobh, County Cork	"Ain't No Sunshine" (Bill Withers)	—N/a
8	Karl Fradgley	25	Douglas Street, County Cork	"I Can't Make You Love Me" (George Michael)	—N/a

Audition Show 5: Kilkenny – 1 December 2002
R/O	Artist	Age	From	Song (Original artists)	Result
1	Natasha Croghan	16	County Roscommon	"Get Here" (Oleta Adams)	—N/a
2	Jason Paul Ryan	24	Liverpool	"American Pie" (Don McLean)	—N/a
3	Trevor O'Neill	23	County Kilkenny	"The First Time Ever I Saw Your Face" (George Michael)	—N/a
4	Ellen Cosgrove	17	Donnybrook, Dublin	"Ain't No Sunshine" (Bill Withers)	—N/a
5	Sharon Malloy	28	Castlecomer, County Kilkenny	"Over the Rainbow" (Eva Cassidy)	—N/a
6	Chris Doran	22	Waterford, County Waterford	"I'll Never Fall in Love Again" (Tom Jones)	—N/a
7	Shauna and Caoimhe McElhinney	Both 16	County Cork	"I Know Him So Well" (Elaine Paige & Barbara Dickson)	Advanced
8	Katrina Lee	16	Belfast	"When I Fall in Love" (Nat King Cole)	—N/a

Audition Show 6: Galway – 8 December 2002
R/O	Artist	Age	From	Song (Original artists)	Result
1	Frank Naughton	30	Galway City, County Galway	"This Is the Moment" (Chuck Wagner)	—N/a
2	Chris Farragher	22	County Mayo	"Just Looking" (Stereophonics)	—N/a
3	Sandi McCash	23	Galway, County Galway	"I Still Haven't Found What I'm Looking For" (U2)	—N/a
4	Adrian Kenny	23	Mayfield, County Cork	"Unchained Melody" (The Righteous Brothers)	—N/a
5	Susan McGowan	19	Athlone, County Westmeath	"Hot Stuff" (Donna Summer)	Advanced
6	Susan Sheahan	18	Mallow, County Cork	"I Hope You Dance" (Lee Ann Womack)	—N/a
7	Lisa Bresnan	22	Limerick, Co. Limerick	"Thank U" (Alanis Morissette)	—N/a
8	David Moore	16	Dublin	"Dancing in the Moonlight" (Toploader)	—N/a

Audition Show 7: Derry – 15 December 2002
R/O	Artist	Age	From	Song (Original artists)	Result
1	Marie-Threse Martin	17	Derry City, County Londonderry	"I Hope That I Don't Fall in Love with You" (Tom Waits)	—N/a
2	Gavin Quinn	21	Cookstown, County Tyrone	"The River" (Garth Brooks)	—N/a
3	Leonna Lees	24	Magherafelt, County Londonderry	"Black Is the Colour" (Christy Moore)	—N/a
4	4D (Paul Donaghy, Andrew Donaghy, Aidan Donaghy & Martin Delaney)		Dungannon, County Tyrone	"Full Force Gale" (Elvis Costello)	—N/a
5	Eoin O'Callaghan	23	Derry City, County Londonderry	"Let It Be" (The Beatles)	—N/a
6	Justin McGurk	28	Cookstown, County Tyrone	"Superman (It's Not Easy)" (Five for Fighting)	—N/a
7	Catriona McGinty	26	Strabane, County Tyrone	"Heartache Tonight" (Eagles)	—N/a
8	Mickey Harte	29	Lifford, County Donegal	"I Won't Back Down" (Tom Petty)	Advanced

Audition Show 8: Kilarney – 22 December 2002
R/O	Artist	Age	From	Song (Original artists)	Result
1	Una O'Riordan	21	Kanturk, County Cork	"Love, Me" (Collin Raye)	—N/a
2	Rosaleen Herlihy	25	Cork, County Cork	"Secret Love" (Doris Day)	—N/a
3	Derek McMahon	26	Sixmilebridge, County Clare	"Endless Love" (Lionel Richie & Diana Ross)	—N/a
4	Catraoine Hickey	16	Cork, County Cork	"Fallin'" (Alicia Keys)	—N/a
5	Kelly Hunter	18	County Cork	"Any Man of Mine" (Shania Twain)	—N/a
6	Fiona O'Neill	18	County Kerry	"You Raise Me Up" (Secret Garden)	—N/a
7	Joanne Fahy	20	Croom, County Limerick	"Breathless" (The Corrs)	Advanced
8	Steve Martyn	31	Navan, County Meath	"All Rise" (Blue)	—N/a

Audition Show 9: North Dublin – 29 December 2002
R/O	Artist	Age	From	Song (Original artists)	Result
1	Sarah Corcoran	17	Galway, County Galway	"Sunny Afternoon" (The Kinks)	—N/a
2	Cara McDowell	28	County Dublin	"Baby Now That I've Found You" (The Foundations)	—N/a
3	Brenda Dunican	23	County Offaly	"No Frontiers" (Jimmy MacCarthy)	—N/a
4	V10 (Marc O'Neill and Shane Butler)			"I Heard It Through the Grapevine" (Marvin Gaye)	—N/a
5	Sinead Hand	18	County Dublin	"Mama Said" (Metallica)	—N/a
6	Simon Casey	23	County Offaly	"Right Here Waiting" (Richard Marx)	Advanced
7	Brian Ormond	23	Clondalkin, County Dublin	"Mandy" (Barry Manilow)	—N/a
8	Susan McFadden	19	Dublin	"Flashdance... What a Feeling" (Irene Cara)	—N/a

The Story So Far – 5 January 2003
Judge	Choice
Darren Smith	Lisa Bresnan
Phil Coulter	Catriona McGinty
Louis Walsh	Brian Ormond
Kerry McFadden	Susan McFadden

==== Live shows ====
The ten live shows took place between 5 January and 8 March 2003. The first seven shows featured various themes: free choice for the first three shows, Irish rock songs for the fourth show, Irish folk/traditional songs for the fifth show, love songs for the sixth show and American songs for the seventh show. Either one or two contestants were eliminated in each of the seven shows. The four remaining contestants each performed their candidate Eurovision songs starting from the eighth show and one contestant was eliminated during each of the eighth and ninth shows. "We've Got the World" performed by Mickey Harte was selected as the winner following the final show and announced the day after on 9 March 2003. 1.3 million televotes were cast during the final show.

Show 1 – 12 January 2003
R/O	Artist	Song (Original artists)	Place	Result
1	Shauna and Caoimhe McElhinney	"I Know Him So Well" (Elaine Paige & Barbara Dickson)	2	Advanced
2	Sarah Brophy	"I Say a Little Prayer" (Karine Costa and Aretha Franklin)	4	Advanced
3	Azi Jegbefume	"My Love is Your Love" (Whitney Houston)	6	Advanced
4	Lisa Bresnan	"Thank U" (Alanis Morissette)	1	Advanced
5	Michael Leonard	"Knockin' on Heaven's Door" (Guns n' Roses)	3	Advanced
6	Catherine Yore	"Natural Woman" (Aretha Franklin)	5	Advanced
7	Catriona McGinty	"Heartache Tonight" (The Eagles)	7	—N/a

Show 2 – 19 January 2003
R/O	Artist	Song (Original artists)	Place	Result
1	Simon Casey	"Right Here Waiting" (Richard Marx)	2	Advanced
2	Joanne Fahy	"Talking in Your Sleep" (Crystal Gayle)	5	Advanced
3	Brian Ormond	"Mandy" (Barry Manilow)	1	Advanced
4	Susan McGowan	"Hot Stuff" (Donna Summer)	6	—N/a
5	Mickey Harte	"I Won't Back Down" (Tom Petty)	3	Advanced
6	Susan McFadden	"Flashdance... What a Feeling" (Irene Cara)	4	Advanced

Show 3 – 26 January 2003
R/O	Artist	Song (Original artists)	Place	Result
1	Azi Jegbefume	"You Gotta Be" (Des'ree)	11-12	—N/a
2	Michael Leonard	"Vincent" (Don McLean)	6	Advanced
3	Catherine Yore	"From a Distance" (Bette Midler)	11-12	—N/a
4	Sarah Brophy	"It Must Have Been Love" (Roxette)	9	Advanced
5	Shauna and Caoimhe McElhinney	"Cruisin'" (Smokey Robinson)	7	Advanced
6	Lisa Bresnan	"Angel" (Sarah McLachlan)	4	Advanced
7	Mickey Harte	"The Joker" (Steve Miller)	2	Advanced
8	Joanne Fahy	"Torn" (Natalie Imbruglia)	8	Advanced
9	Simon Casey	"Desperado" (The Eagles)	1	Advanced
10	Susan McFadden	"We've Got Tonight" (Bob Seger)	5	Advanced
11	Brian Ormond	"Heaven" (Bryan Adams)	3	Advanced

Show 4 – 2 February 2003
R/O	Artist	Song (Original artists)	Place	Result
1	Michael Leonard	"One" (U2)	4	Advanced
2	Sarah Brophy	"I Still Haven't Found What I'm Looking For" (U2)	7	Advanced
3	Shauna and Caoimhe McElhinney	"A Good Heart" (Fergal Sharkey)	8	Advanced
4	Lisa Bresnan	"Crazy Love" (Van Morrison)	3	Advanced
5	Mickey Harte	"Teenage Kicks" (The Undertones)	2	Advanced
6	Joanne Fahy	"Dreams" (The Corrs)	9	—N/a
7	Simon Casey	"Sarah" (Thin Lizzy)	1	Advanced
8	Susan McFadden	"Nothing Compares 2 U" (Sinéad O'Connor)	6	Advanced
9	Brian Ormond	"Have I Told You Lately" (Van Morrison)	5	Advanced

Show 5 – 9 February 2003
R/O	Artist	Song (Original artists)	Place	Result
1	Michael Leonard	"Green Fields of France" (The Fureys)	3	Advanced
2	Sarah Brophy	"Katie" (Jimmy MacCarthy)	7	Advanced
3	Shauna and Caoimhe McElhinney	"Neidin" (Jimmy MacCarthy)	5	Advanced
4	Lisa Bresnan	"Ride On" (Jimmy MacCarthy)	4	Advanced
5	Mickey Harte	"The Island" (Paul Brady)	2	Advanced
6	Simon Casey	"Scorn Not His Simplicity" (Phil Coulter)	1	Advanced
7	Susan McFadden	"No Frontiers" (Jimmy MacCarthy)	8	—N/a
8	Brian Ormond	"Only Our Rivers Run Free" (Planxty)	6	Advanced

Show 6 – 16 February 2003
R/O	Artist	Song (Original artists)	Place	Result
1	Michael Leonard	"Hello" (Lionel Richie)	5	Advanced
2	Sarah Brophy	"The Rose" (Bette Midler)	7	—N/a
3	Shauna and Caoimhe McElhinney	"More Than Words" (Extreme)	6	Advanced
4	Lisa Bresnan	"This Year's Love" (David Gray)	3	Advanced
5	Mickey Harte	"Every Breath You Take" (The Police)	1	Advanced
6	Simon Casey	"I Can't Make You Love Me" (Bonnie Raitt)	2	Advanced
7	Brian Ormond	"Nothing's Gonna Change My Love for You" (George Benson)	4	Advanced

Show 7 – 23 February 2003
R/O	Artist	Song (Original artists)	Place	Result
1	Michael Leonard	"If Tomorrow Never Comes" (Garth Brooks)	4	Advanced
2	Shauna and Caoimhe McElhinney	"Closer to Fine" (Indigo Girls)	5-6	—N/a
3	Lisa Bresnan	"Your So Vain" (Carly Simon)	3	Advanced
4	Mickey Harte	"Jack and Diane" (John Mellencamp)	2	Advanced
5	Simon Casey	"Lyin' Eyes" (The Eagles)	1	Advanced
6	Brian Ormond	"Amazed" (Lonestar)	5-6	—N/a

Show 8 – 2 March 2003
R/O	Artist	Song	Place	Result
1	Michael Leonard	"I Couldn't Love You More"	3	Advanced
2	Lisa Bresnan	"I'll Still Be Right Here"	4	—N/a
3	Mickey Harte	"We've Got the World"	1	Advanced
4	Simon Casey	"A Better Plan"	2	Advanced

Show 9 – 9 March 2003
R/O	Artist	Song	Place	Result
1	Michael Leonard	"I Couldn't Love You More"	3	—N/a
2	Mickey Harte	"We've Got the World"	1	Advanced
3	Simon Casey	"A Better Plan"	2	Advanced

Final – 16 March 2003
R/O	Artist	Song	Place
1	Mickey Harte	"We've Got the World"	1
2	Simon Casey	"A Better Plan"	2

== At Eurovision ==
According to Eurovision rules, all nations with the exceptions of the bottom five countries in the 2002 contest competed in the final on 24 May 2003. On 29 November 2002, an allocation draw was held which determined the running order and Ireland was set to perform in position 3, following the entry from Austria and before the entry from Turkey. Ireland finished in eleventh place with 53 points.

In Ireland, the show was broadcast on RTÉ One with commentary by Marty Whelan and Phil Coulter.

=== Voting ===
Below is a breakdown of points awarded to Ireland and awarded by Ireland in the contest. The nation awarded its 12 points to Norway in the contest. RTÉ appointed Pamela Flood as its spokesperson to announce the Irish votes during the show.

Points awarded to Ireland
Score	Country
12 points	United Kingdom
10 points	
8 points	
7 points	Cyprus; Portugal
6 points	Norway
5 points	Malta; Turkey
4 points	Croatia
3 points	
2 points	Iceland; Slovenia
1 point	Belgium; Latvia; Ukraine

Points awarded by Ireland
Score	Country
12 points	Norway
10 points	Belgium
8 points	Estonia
7 points	Iceland
6 points	Croatia
5 points	Netherlands
4 points	Germany
3 points	Malta
2 points	Portugal
1 point	Greece

==== Delayed televoting results ====
Televoting was provided to viewers in Ireland during the contest, however due to a delay in receiving the full results the votes of an assembled back-up jury were used instead to provide the Irish votes. RTÉ subsequently revealed the top 10 countries from the Irish televoting after the contest.

Delayed televoting results
Score	Country
12 points	Austria
10 points	Iceland
8 points	Norway
7 points	Sweden
6 points	Germany
5 points	Latvia
4 points	Romania
3 points	Netherlands
2 points	Belgium
1 point	Estonia
