= Croatia in the Eurovision Song Contest 2003 =

- Eurovision Song Contest 2003
- Participating broadcaster: Croatian Radiotelevision (HRT)
- Country: Croatia
- Selection process: Dora 2003
- Selection date: 9 March 2003

Competing entry
- Song: "Više nisam tvoja"
- Artist: Claudia Beni
- Songwriter: Andrej Babić

Placement
- Final result: 15th, 29 points

Participation chronology

Croatia was represented at the Eurovision Song Contest 2003 with the song "Više nisam tvoja", written by Andrej Babić, and performed by Claudia Beni. The Croatian participating broadcaster, Croatian Radiotelevision (HRT), organised the national final Dora 2003 to select its entry for the contest.

Twenty-four entries competed in the national final which consisted of three shows: two semi-finals and a final. Six entries qualified from each semi-final on 7 and 8 March 2003 to compete in the final on 9 March 2003. In the final, "Više nisam tvoja" performed by Claudia Beni was selected as the winner following a regional televote.

Croatia competed in the Eurovision Song Contest which took place on 24 May 2003. Performing during the show in position 8, Croatia placed fifteenth out of the 26 participating countries, scoring 29 points.

== Background ==
Prior to the 2003 contest, Croatian Radiotelevision (Croatian: Hrvatska radiotelevizija; HRT) had participated in the Eurovision Song Contest representing Croatia ten times since its first entry in 1993. Its best result in the contest was fourth, achieved on two occasions: in 1996 with the song "Sveta ljubav" performed by Maja Blagdan and in 1999 with the song "Marija Magdalena" performed by Doris Dragović. In 2002, it placed eleventh with the song "Everything I Want" by Vesna Pisarović.

As part of its duties as participating broadcaster, HRT organises the selection of its entry in the Eurovision Song Contest and broadcasts the event in the country. Since 1993, HRT organised the national final Dora in order to select its entry for the contest, a method that was continued for its 2003 participation.

== Before Eurovision ==
=== Dora 2003 ===
Dora 2003 was the eleventh edition of the national selection Dora organised by HRT to select its entry for the Eurovision Song Contest 2003. The competition consisted of two semi-finals on 7 and 8 March 2003 and a final on 9 March 2003, all taking place at the Hotel Kvarner in Opatija and broadcast on HTV1 as well as online via the broadcaster's website hrt.hr.

==== Format ====
Twenty-four songs competed in Dora 2003 which consisted of three shows: two semi-finals and a final. Twelve songs competed in each semi-final with the top six proceeding to complete the twelve-song lineup in the final. The results of all shows were determined solely by public televoting, and the votes were divided into five telephone regions in Croatia, each of them which created an overall ranking from which points from 1 (lowest) to 12 (highest) were assigned to the competing songs. Ties in all shows were decided in favour of the entry that received the higher number of high-scoring points.

Dora 2003 televoting regions
- A: Slavonia
- B: Dalmatia
- C: Istria, Primorje-Gorski Kotar and Lika
- D: Northwest Croatia
- E: Central Croatia

==== Competing entries ====
On 15 December 2002, HRT opened a submission period where artists and composers were able to submit their entries to the broadcaster with the deadline on 20 January 2003. 270 entries were received by the broadcaster during the submission period. A fifteen-member expert committee consisting of representatives of Damir Matković (HRT), Aleksandar Kostadinov (HRT), Željko Mesar (HRT), Miroslav Škoro (HDU), Stjepan Mihaljinec (HDS), Siniša Doronjga (HGU), Đorđe Novković (Croatia Records), Fedor Boić (Tonika), Boris Horvat (Aquarius Records), Silvije Varga (Dancing Bear), Siniša Bizović (Dallas Records), Branko Komljenović (Menart), Tihomir Preradović (Tutico), Željko Barba (Orfej) and Goran Karan (Skalinada) reviewed the received submissions and selected twenty-four artists and songs for the competition. HRT announced the competing entries on 30 January 2003 and among the artists were Maja Blagdan who represented Croatia in the Eurovision Song Contest 1996 and Emilija Kokić who won the Eurovision Song Contest 1989 for Yugoslavia as a member of Riva.

Artist	Song	Songwriter(s)
Alan Hržica	"Uzmi svu svoju ljubav"	Alan Hržica
Alen Vitasović	"Lakše je kad se kraj ne vidi"	Vinko Škaron, Vlasta Juretić
Alenka Milano	"Nasmij me"	Fedor Boić, Stevo Cvikić
Andrea Ćubrić	"Ne vjeruj mi"	Ante Pecotić
Ani Franičević	"Sve me podsjeća na tebe"	Željen Klašterka, Borivoj Vincetić
Antonija Šola	"Dođi najbrže"	Nenad Ninčević, Miro Buljan
Claudia Beni	"Više nisam tvoja"	Andrej Babić
Emilija Kokić	"Žena od pepela"	Marko Tomasović, Emilija Kokić
Gina Kuljanić	"Sanjam"	Andrej Baša, Drago Britvić
Giuliano	"Moja lipa"	Tomislav Mrduljaš
Ivan Brdar	"More ljubavi"	Ivan Brdar
Ivana Kindl	"Ti mi daješ snagu"	Silvio Pasarić, Ivana Kindl
Izabela Martinović	"Sretna sam"	Boris Domazet, Vedran Gavrić
Jacques Houdek	"Na krilima ljubavi"	Jacques Houdek, Boris Đurđević
Jelena Radan	"Povedi me"	Meri Jaman, Anita Valo, Ines Prajo, Arijana Kunštek
Karma	"Noćas te ne dam nikome"	Josip Miani, Nenad Čirjak, Senka Dodik
Kawasaki 3P	"Antonija"	Tomislav Vukelić
Luka Nižetić	"Robot"	Nenad Ninčević, Miro Buljan
Maja Blagdan	"Moje ime je ljubav"	Zrinko Tutić
Maja Šuput and Enjoy	"Čista petica"	Denis Dumančić, Fayo
Nina Badrić	"Čarobno jutro"	Nina Badrić, Danijel Troha, Sandra Sagena
Tina and Nikša	"Za sva vremena"	Nikša Jurinović
Viva	"Pitaju me pitaju"	Nenad Ninčević, Miro Buljan
Zvonimir Divić	"Samo more zna"	Zdenko Runjić, Krste Juras

==== Semi-finals ====
The two semi-finals took place on 7 and 8 March 2003. The first semi-final was hosted by Ljiljana Vinković and Mirko Fodor, while the second semi-final was hosted by Karmela Vukov-Colić and Davor Meštrović. The six qualifiers for the final from each semi-final were determined by a regional televote. In addition to the performances of the competing entries, 2001 Croatian Eurovision entrant Vanna performed as the interval act during the first semi-final, while 2000 Croatian Eurovision entrant Goran Karan performed as the interval act during the second semi-final.

Semi-final 1 – 7 March 2003
R/O	Artist	Song	Televoting Regions					Total	Place
R/O	Artist	Song	A	B	C	D	E	Total	Place
1	Ani Franičević	"Sve me podsjeća na tebe"	3	7	3	3	4	20	9
2	Alan Hržica	"Uzmi svu svoju ljubav"	8	2	5	7	7	29	8
3	Izabela Martinović	"Sretna sam"	2	3	2	1	1	9	12
4	Antonija Šola	"Dođi najbrže"	4	1	4	4	3	16	10
5	Kawasaki 3P	"Antonija"	7	5	7	8	11	38	5
6	Claudia Beni	"Više nisam tvoja"	11	10	12	11	9	53	2
7	Alenka Milano	"Nasmij me"	1	6	1	2	2	12	11
8	Tina and Nikša	"Za sva vremena"	10	9	8	9	8	44	4
9	Jelena Radan	"Povedi me"	6	8	6	5	6	31	7
10	Maja Šuput and Enjoy	"Čista petica"	12	11	9	12	12	56	1
11	Alen Vitasović	"Lakše je kad se kraj ne vidi"	5	4	11	6	5	31	6
12	Maja Blagdan	"Moje ime je ljubav"	9	12	10	10	10	51	3

Semi-final 2 – 8 March 2003
R/O	Artist	Song	Televoting Regions					Total	Place
R/O	Artist	Song	A	B	C	D	E	Total	Place
1	Luka Nižetić	"Robot"	6	9	6	5	4	30	6
2	Gina Kuljanić	"Sanjam"	8	8	11	8	8	43	4
3	Ivan Brdar	"More ljubavi"	1	1	3	1	1	7	12
4	Andrea Ćubrić	"Ne vjeruj mi"	3	2	2	2	3	12	11
5	Viva	"Pitaju me pitaju"	5	7	5	7	5	29	7
6	Zvonimir Divić	"Samo more zna"	2	5	1	3	2	13	10
7	Karma	"Noćas te ne dam nikome"	12	11	12	12	10	57	1
8	Ivana Kindl	"Ti mi daješ snagu"	7	3	4	4	7	25	9
9	Jacques Houdek	"Na krilima ljubavi"	9	4	8	9	11	41	5
10	Emilija Kokić	"Žena od pepela"	4	6	7	6	6	29	7
11	Nina Badrić	"Čarobno jutro"	10	10	10	11	12	53	2
12	Giuliano	"Moja lipa"	11	12	9	10	9	51	3

==== Final ====
The final took place on 9 March 2003, hosted by Duško Ćurlić and Danijela Trbović-Vlajki. The winner, "Više nisam tvoja" performed by Claudia Beni, was determined by a regional televote. In addition to the performances of the competing entries, Divas performed with Gabi Novak, Josipa Lisac, Meri Cetinić and Radojka Šverko as the interval act during the show.

Final – 9 March 2003
R/O	Artist	Song	Televoting Regions					Total	Place
R/O	Artist	Song	A	B	C	D	E	Total	Place
1	Luka Nižetić	"Robot"	4	8	2	3	3	20	10
2	Alen Vitasović	"Lakše je kad se kraj ne vidi"	1	1	7	1	1	11	11
3	Kawasaki 3P	"Antonija"	3	4	3	8	10	28	8
4	Jacques Houdek	"Na krilima ljubavi"	8	3	8	7	9	35	5
5	Gina Kuljanić	"Sanjam"	6	9	10	6	8	39	4
6	Tina and Nikša	"Za sva vremena"	7	5	5	4	6	27	9
7	Maja Blagdan	"Moje ime je ljubav"	2	2	1	2	2	9	12
8	Giuliano	"Moja lipa"	5	10	6	5	4	30	7
9	Nina Badrić	"Čarobno jutro"	9	11	9	11	11	51	2
10	Claudia Beni	"Više nisam tvoja"	12	12	12	12	12	60	1
11	Maja Šuput and Enjoy	"Čista petica"	10	6	4	9	5	34	6
12	Karma	"Noćas te ne dam nikome"	11	7	11	10	7	46	3

=== Preparation ===
An English version of "Više nisam tvoja" entitled "This Is for Real" was presented to the public on 16 March during a special programme broadcast on HTV1 and HR 2. The language of the song Claudia Beni would perform at the Eurovision Song Contest was determined exclusively by a public televote, and the Croatian version was selected with 10,926 votes while the English version received 5,678 votes. On 21 March, HRT announced that "Više nisam tvoja" would be performed in a bilingual mix of both Croatian and English at the contest.

== At Eurovision ==
According to Eurovision rules, all nations with the exceptions of the bottom ten countries in the 2002 contest competed in the final on 24 May 2003. On 29 November 2002, a special allocation draw was held which determined the running order and Croatia was set to perform in position 8, following the entry from Portugal and before the entry from Cyprus. Croatia finished in sixth place with 29 points.

The show was broadcast in Croatia on HTV1 with commentary by Daniela Trbović.

=== Voting ===
Below is a breakdown of points awarded to Croatia and awarded by Croatia in the contest. The nation awarded its 12 points to Russia in the contest. HRT appointed Davor Meštrović as its spokesperson to announce the Croatian votes during the final.

Points awarded to Croatia
Score	Country
12 points	
10 points	
8 points	Slovenia
7 points	
6 points	Bosnia and Herzegovina; Ireland
5 points	Austria
4 points	
3 points	Turkey
2 points	
1 point	Greece

Points awarded by Croatia
Score	Country
12 points	Russia
10 points	Turkey
8 points	Bosnia and Herzegovina
7 points	Spain
6 points	Iceland
5 points	Austria
4 points	Ireland
3 points	Slovenia
2 points	Sweden
1 point	Romania
