= Austria in the Eurovision Song Contest 2003 =

- Eurovision Song Contest 2003
- Participating broadcaster: Österreichischer Rundfunk (ORF)
- Country: Austria
- Selection process: Song.Null.Drei
- Selection date: 14 March 2003

Competing entry
- Song: "Weil der Mensch zählt"
- Artist: Alf Poier
- Songwriter: Alf Poier

Placement
- Final result: 6th, 101 points

Participation chronology

Austria was represented at the Eurovision Song Contest 2003 with the song "Weil der Mensch zählt" written and performed by Alf Poier. The Austrian participating broadcaster, Österreichischer Rundfunk (ORF), organised the national final Song.Null.Drei in order to select its entry for the contest. Ten songs competed in a televised show where a public vote split between male and female voters exclusively selected "Weil der Mensch zählt" performed by Alf Poier as the winner.

Austria competed in the Eurovision Song Contest which took place on 24 May 2003. Performing during the show in position 2, Austria placed sixth out of the 26 participating countries, scoring 101 points.

== Background ==
Prior to the 2003 contest, Österreichischer Rundfunk (ORF) has participated in the Eurovision Song Contest representing Austria thirty-nine times since its first entry in 1957. It has won the contest on one occasion: in 1966 with the song "Merci, Chérie" performed by Udo Jürgens. Its least successful result has been last place, achieved on seven occasions, most recently in 1991. Austria has also received nul points on three occasions; in 1962, in 1988, and in 1991.

As part of its duties as participating broadcaster, ORF organises the selection of its entry in the Eurovision Song Contest and broadcasts the event in the country. The broadcaster confirmed its intentions to participate at the 2003 contest on 27 November 2002. From 1995 to 2000, ORF has held an internal selection to choose the artist and song at the contest. For the 2002 contest, the broadcaster had set up national finals with several artists to choose both the song and performer. On 11 January 2003, the broadcaster announced that its entry for the 2003 contest would be selected through a national final.

== Before Eurovision ==
=== Song.Null.Drei ===
Song.Null.Drei (Song.Zero.Three) was the national final organised by ORF to select its entry for the Eurovision Song Contest 2003. The competition took place on 14 March 2003 at the ORF Center in Vienna, hosted by Gabriela Dorschner and DJ Ötzi and broadcast on ORF eins. The first part of the national final was watched by 812,000 viewers in Austria with a market share of 33%, while the second part was watched by 733,000 viewers in Austria with a market share of 40%.

==== Format ====
Ten songs competed in the competition where the winner was selected exclusively by public voting. Viewers were able to vote via telephone or SMS and the results were split between male and female voters, each of them which created an overall ranking from which points from 1 (lowest) to 10 (highest) were distributed. After the combination of both scores, the entry with the highest number of points was selected as the winner.

==== Competing entries ====
Ten artists were nominated by record companies and revealed on 25 February 2003. Among the competing artists were former Austrian Eurovision representatives Petra Frey who represented Austria in 1994, and Stella Jones (as part of Substitute) who represented Austria in 1995.

Artist	Song	Songwriter(s)
Aalysha	"Daydream"	Alexander Kahr, Robert Pfluger
Alf Poier	"Weil der Mensch zählt"	Alf Poier
Eyeland	"We Will Survive"	Mark Robert Thomas, Robert Cheese, Marlies Jesernik, Gottfried Jesernik, Nino Holm
J.O.B.	"All Fingers and Thumbs"	Alexander Kahr, Robert Pfluger
Kostrouch	"Frei sein"	Roman Kostrouch
Patricia	"Don't Wanna Be"	Alexander Kahr, Robert Pfluger
Petra Frey	"This Night Should Never End"	Peter Starkowski, Tom Fairchild
Sabine Neibersch	"Dreaming of You"	Susanne Prammerdorfer, Peter Prammerdorfer
Substitute	"Girls of Summer"	Christine Nachbauer
Xtraordinary	"Separate Ways"	Peter Moritz, Michael Willmann, Helmut Eibisberger, Klaus Herunter, René Pichler, Jasmin Holzmann

==== Final ====
The televised final took place on 14 March 2003. Ten songs competed and public televoting split between male and female voters selected "Weil der Mensch zählt" performed by Alf Poier as the winner.

Final – 14 March 2003
R/O	Artist	Song	Televote			Place
R/O	Artist	Song	Male	Female	Total	Place
1	Substitute	"Girls of Summer"	2	1	3	10
2	Kostrouch	"Frei sein"	1	3	4	9
3	Xtraordinary	"Separate Ways"	4	5	9	6
4	Eyeland	"We Will Survive"	3	2	5	8
5	Patricia	"Don't Wanna Be"	5	4	9	6
6	Alf Poier	"Weil der Mensch zählt"	10	10	20	1
7	Petra Frey	"This Night Should Never End"	9	9	18	2
8	J.O.B.	"All Fingers and Thumbs"	8	8	16	3
9	Sabine Neibersch	"Dreaming of You"	6	7	13	4
10	Aalysha	"Daydream"	7	6	13	4

== At Eurovision ==
According to Eurovision rules, all nations with the exceptions of the bottom five countries in the 2002 contest competed in the final on 24 May 2003. On 29 November 2002, a special allocation draw was held which determined the running order and Austria was set to perform in position 2, following the entry from Iceland and before the entry from Ireland. Austria finished in sixth place with 101 points.

The show was broadcast in Austria on ORF eins with commentary by Andi Knoll.

=== Voting ===
Below is a breakdown of points awarded to Austria and awarded by Austria in the contest. The nation awarded its 12 points to Turkey in the contest. ORF appointed Dodo Roscic as its spokesperson to announce the Austrian votes during the show.

Points awarded to Austria
Score	Country
12 points	
10 points	Iceland; Portugal
8 points	Netherlands; Norway; Spain; United Kingdom
7 points	Slovenia
6 points	Estonia; Sweden; Turkey
5 points	Bosnia and Herzegovina; Croatia
4 points	Cyprus; Latvia
3 points	
2 points	Belgium; Germany; Greece
1 point	

Points awarded by Austria
Score	Country
12 points	Turkey
10 points	Poland
8 points	Russia
7 points	Bosnia and Herzegovina
6 points	Romania
5 points	Croatia
4 points	Belgium
3 points	Sweden
2 points	Norway
1 point	Germany
