= Greece in the Eurovision Song Contest 2003 =

- Eurovision Song Contest 2003
- Participating broadcaster: Hellenic Broadcasting Corporation (ERT)
- Country: Greece
- Selection process: Ena tragoudi gia tin Evropi
- Selection date: 26 February 2003

Competing entry
- Song: "Never Let You Go"
- Artist: Mando
- Songwriters: Adamantia Stamatopoulou; Terry Siganos

Placement
- Final result: 17th, 25 points

Participation chronology

Greece was represented at the Eurovision Song Contest 2003 with the song "Never Let You Go", composed by Adamantia Stamatopoulou, with lyrics by Teri Siganos, and performed by Stamatopoulou herself under her stage name Mando. The Greek participating broadcaster, the Hellenic Broadcasting Corporation (ERT), organised a public selection process entitled Ena tragoudi gia tin Evropi (Ένα τραγούδι για την Ευρώπη; "A song for Europe") to determine its entry for the contest. Held on 26 February 2003 in Athens, the event saw ten songs compete to be the Greek entry; the results were determined by a combination of jury, SMS and televoting. The song "Never Let You Go" by Mando received the most votes and was selected to represent the nation.

To promote the entry, a music video and five track CD single for the song were released and Mando made appearances at events in Cyprus, Croatia, and Malta, as well as at Mediterranean party in Riga in the lead up to the contest. "Never Let You Go" was performed 17th at the international contest on 24 May 2003 and at the close of the voting process, finished in 17th place, receiving 25 points from six countries.

== Background ==
The Hellenic Broadcasting Corporation (Greek: Ελληνική Ραδιοφωνία Τηλεόραση (Ellinikí Radiofonía Tileórasi); ERT) is a full member of the European Broadcasting Union (EBU), thus eligible to participate in the Eurovision Song Contest representing Greece. Prior to 2003, Greece had participated in the contest 23 times since its first entry in 1974. To this point, its best result was third place which was achieved in 2001 with the song "Die for You" by Antique. Greece's least successful result was in 1998 when it placed 20th with the song "Mia krifi evaisthisia" by Thalassa, receiving only twelve points in total, all from Cyprus.

== Before Eurovision ==
=== Ena tragoudi gia tin Evropi ===
Initially titled Psifiste gia to elliniko tragoudi (Ψηφίστε για το ελληνικό τραγούδι; "Vote for the Greek song"), Ena tragoudi gia tin Evropi (Ένα τραγούδι για την Ευρώπη; "A song for Europe") was the Greek selection process developed by ERT to select its entry for the Eurovision Song Contest 2003. The competition took place on 26 February 2003 at the Ciné Keramikos Nightclub in Athens and was hosted by Dafni Bokota, Rika Vagiani and Popi Tsapanidou; it was televised on ET1 with a radio broadcast on Kosmos 93.6. The event was directed by Christos Fasois, produced by Stefanos Agorastakis and the sets were designed by Vassilis Tsirogiannis.

==== Competing entries ====
Artists and composers had until 2 December 2002 to submit their entries. From all 243 entries submitted, 10 entries were selected by a seven-member jury to participate in the national final. The jury consisted of past Eurovision contestants Evridiki (who represented Cyprus in 1992 and in 1994) and Paschalis Arvanitidis (who represented Greece in 1977), joined by Dafni Bokota, Giorgos Katsaros, Iro Trigoni, Johnny Kalimeris and Antonis Andrikakis. The competing artists were revealed on 10 February 2003 and the songs in their entirety were presented on 23 February 2003. Music videos of each competing entry aired on ET1 as part of the presentation and were rebroadcast over the three day period leading up to the event.

Competing entries
| Artist | Song | Songwriter(s) |
|---|---|---|
| Alexandros Chatzis | "I agapi einai dromos – L'amore e la strada" (Η αγάπη είναι δρόμος) | Persa Souka, Vanta Koutsokosta |
| Dimitra Aggelou and Alter Ego (Note: The song's writer Christos Giannopoulos was initially announced as the artist to perform the song with Alter Ego, however he was replaced by Dimitra Aggelou prior to the competition.) | "Kapoios erotas fotia" (Κάποιος έρωτας φωτιά) | Christos Giannopoulos |
| Giannis Vardis | "Mia stigmi" (Μια στιγμή) | Dimitris Kontopoulos, Michalis Sfikas, Dimitris Sotakis |
| Giorgos Kaminaris, Lakis Papadopoulos and Liana Papalexi | "Kapote – Come with Me" (Κάποτε) | Giorgos Kaminaris, Stefanos Kotronakis |
| Giorgos Nassios | "It's Alright" | Giorgos Nassios |
| Kostas Chrisis | "Gotta Be a Way for Love" | Konstantinos Tseleste, Kostas Chrisis |
| Mando | "Never Let You Go" | Mando, Terry Siganos |
| Maria Atsopardi | "Tis nychtes megalono" (Τις νύχτες μεγαλώνω) | Panagiotis Giatrakos, Giannis Pattas |
| Marian Georgiou | "Can't Escape – Come Back" | Konstantinos Tseleste |
| Sabrina | "Camera" | Nikos Doukakis |

==== Final ====
The final took place on 26 February 2003. Ten songs competed and the winner, "Never Let You Go" performed by Mando, was selected by a combination of jury voting (40%), SMS voting (which ran between 23 and 26 February 2003) (30%) and televoting (30%). The jury consisted of Katsaros, Rena Kapitsala, Giorgos Papastefanou, Johnny Kalimeris, Antonis Andrikakis, Munro Forbes, and Marija Naumova, who won Eurovision for Latvia in 2002. The selected song "Never Let You Go" was written by Mando herself along with Terry Siganos. The singer was well known in Greece, having tried to represent the nation in the past and having penned the song "Where You Are" for Jessica Simpson. Eurovision news website ESCToday noted that the scale of the national final was much larger than had been organised in the past for the Greek entry. The event included a dance routine by Greek choreographer Fokas Evangelinos that was performed following the conclusion of the ten candidate entries' performances and showcased Greek Eurovision entries of the past dating back to 1974. These included "Krasi, thalassa ke t'agori mou" by Marinella (1974), "Mathima solfege" by Paschalis, Marianna, Robert and Bessy (1977), "Charlie Chaplin" by Tania Tsanaklidou (1978), "Sokrati" by Elpida (1979), "Autostop" by Anna Vissi and the Epikouri (1980), "Stop" by Bang (1987), and "Die for You" by Antique (2001). It also featured performances by Michalis Rakintzis, who represented Greece in 2002, singing his entry "S.A.G.A.P.O.", as well as Stelios Constantas, who would represent Cyprus in 2003, singing his entry "Feeling Alive".

Results of Ena tragoudi gia tin Evropi – 26 February 2003
| R/O | Artist | Song | Jury (40%) | SMS (30%) | | Televote (30%) | | Place |
| R/O | Artist | Song | Jury (40%) | Votes | Rank | Votes | Rank | Place |
|---|---|---|---|---|---|---|---|---|
| 1 | Giorgos Nassios | "It's Alright" | 5 | 780 | 8 | 5,320 | 7 | 7 |
| 2 | Sabrina | "Camera" | 2 | 4,679 | 3 | 18,721 | 4 | 3 |
| 3 | Maria Atsopardi | "Tis nychtes megalono" | 6 | 941 | 6 | 6,388 | 6 | 6 |
| 4 | Dimitra Aggelou and Alter Ego | "Kapoios erotas fotia" | 8 | 514 | 10 | 3,477 | 9 | 9 |
| 5 | Mando | "Never Let You Go" | 1 | 5,376 | 2 | 34,096 | 1 | 1 |
| 6 | Alexandros Chatzis | "I agapi einai dromos – L'amore e la strada" | 4 | 3,166 | 4 | 21,063 | 3 | 4 |
| 7 | Kostas Chrisis | "Gotta Be a Way for Love" | 9 | 789 | 7 | 4,918 | 8 | 8 |
| 8 | Giannis Vardis | "Mia stigmi" | 3 | 8,595 | 1 | 32,096 | 2 | 2 |
| 9 | Marian Georgiou | "Can't Escape – Come Back" | 10 | 569 | 9 | 2,860 | 10 | 10 |
| 10 | Giorgos Kaminaris, Lakis Papadopoulos and Liana Papalexi | "Kapote – Come with Me" | 7 | 1,412 | 5 | 8,221 | 5 | 5 |

=== Promotion ===
To promote the entry, "Never Let You Go" was a released as a CD single with five versions. It was later accompanied by a music video that was released in early May 2003. Directed by Kostas Kapetanidis, the video premiered on Greek music channel MAD TV. Mando also embarked on a promotional tour in the lead up the Eurovision Song Contest, appearing in Cyprus, Croatia and Malta, where she appeared on Maltese television. On 23 May, she attended the Mediterranean Party in Riga along with entrants from Cyprus, Spain, Malta and Israel, performing "Never Let You Go" in two versions.

== At Eurovision ==
The Eurovision Song Contest 2003 took place at the Skonto Hall in Riga, Latvia, on 24 May 2003. According to the Eurovision rules, the participant list for the contest was composed of: the winning country from the previous year's contest; any countries which had not participated in the previous year's contest; and those which had obtained the highest placing in the previous contest, up to the maximum 26 participants in total. The draw for running order had previously been held on 29 November 2002 in Riga, with the results being revealed during a delayed broadcast of the proceedings later that day. The contest was broadcast within Greece on ET1 television and ERA radio with commentary by Dafni Bokota and Nikos Triboulidis, respectively.

"Never Let You Go" was performed 17th on the night (following Ukraine's Olexandr with "Hasta la vista" and preceding Norway's Jostein Hasselgård with "I'm Not Afraid to Move On"). For her Eurovision appearance, Mando wore a black gown with a very tight lace-up bodice. Her performance featured four backing vocalists, which included her sister and Alex Panayi.

=== Voting ===
Televoting was an obligatory voting method for all participating countries. Point values of 1–8, 10 and 12 were awarded to the 10 most popular songs of the televote, in ascending order. Countries voted in the same order as they had performed. At the close of voting, Greece placed 17th in the field of 26 entries, with the performance having received 25 points. This total included the top 12 points from Cyprus, to which the nation also awarded its 12 points. As the nation failed to reach the top 11 in the final, the country had to compete in the semi-final of the following year's contest.

Points awarded to Greece
| Score | Country |
|---|---|
| 12 points | Cyprus |
| 10 points | |
| 8 points | |
| 7 points | |
| 6 points | |
| 5 points | Germany |
| 4 points | Turkey |
| 3 points | |
| 2 points | Romania |
| 1 point | Ireland; Russia |

Points awarded by Greece
| Score | Country |
|---|---|
| 12 points | Cyprus |
| 10 points | Russia |
| 8 points | Belgium |
| 7 points | Turkey |
| 6 points | Poland |
| 5 points | Spain |
| 4 points | Romania |
| 3 points | Israel |
| 2 points | Austria |
| 1 point | Croatia |

== Notes and references ==
=== Sources ===
- O'Connor, John Kennedy (2010). The Eurovision Song Contest: The Official History (2nd ed.). London: Carlton Books. ISBN 978-1-84732-521-1.
