= Cyprus in the Eurovision Song Contest 2003 =

- Eurovision Song Contest 2003
- Participating broadcaster: Cyprus Broadcasting Corporation (CyBC)
- Country: Cyprus
- Selection process: Internal selection
- Announcement date: 11 February 2003

Competing entry
- Song: "Feeling Alive"
- Artist: Stelios Constantas
- Songwriter: Stelios Constantas

Placement
- Final result: 20th, 15 points

Participation chronology

Cyprus was represented at the Eurovision Song Contest 2003 with the song "Feeling Alive", written and performed by Stelios Constantas. The Cypriot participating broadcaster, the Cyprus Broadcasting Corporation (CyBC), internally selected its entry for the contest. Constantas, had previously attempted to represent the nation at the contest after taking part in the 1997 and 1999 selection processes.

CyBC announced its entry for the 2003 contest on 11 February 2003, having been selected internally by a three-member committee. To promote the entry, the song was released as a CD single and to radio and television stations within both Cyprus and Greece. Internationally, it was also performed in Malta, Latvia, Poland, and Spain in the lead up to the contest.

Cyprus was drawn to compete ninth in the contest, held on 24 May 2003. At the end of the night, the nation placed 20th in the field of 26 entries, receiving 15 points in total from Greece, Israel, and Malta.

== Background ==
Prior to the 2003 contest, the Cyprus Broadcasting Corporation (CyBC) had participated in the Eurovision Song Contest representing Cyprus 20 times since its first entry in 1981. It then participated yearly, only missing the 1988 contest when its selected song "Thimame" by Yiannis Dimitrou was disqualified for being previously released, and the 2001 contest when it was relegated. To this point, the country's best placing was fifth, which it achieved twice: in 1982 with the song "Mono i agapi" performed by Anna Vissi and in 1997 with "Mana mou" performed by Hara and Andreas Constantinou. Cyprus' least successful result was in 1986 when it placed last with the song "Tora zo" by Elpida, receiving only four points in total.

== Before Eurovision ==
=== Internal selection ===
To be considered for the 2003 contest for Cyprus, artists and composers were able to submit their entries to CyBC from 8 to 20 January 2003. Artists of any nationality were able to submit entries, however all composers were required to have Cypriot nationality. At the conclusion of the deadline, over 40 candidate songs were received by CyBC, with some sources reporting as many as 52 songs. On 11 February 2003, the broadcaster announced that the three-member selection committee had internally selected the English-language song "Feeling Alive" performed by Stelios Constantas to represent Cyprus in Riga. "Feeling Alive" was written and composed by Constantas and was initially set to be part of an upcoming album before he decided to submit it for consideration for Eurovision. Constantas had previously attempted to represent Cyprus in the Eurovision Song Contest after taking part in the 1997 and 1999 selection processes. The selection committee consisted of Evi Droutsa (lyricist), Lia Vissi (who represented Cyprus in 1985) and Marios Skordis (Head of Delegation for Cyprus). In choosing an English-language song, Constantas noted that he thought the judges at the contest would vote more positively if they could understand the song.

=== Promotion ===
"Feeling Alive" was released as a CD single as part of the Cypriot entry's promotional activities.

To promote the entry, a five track CD single was released by V2 Records in Cyprus and Greece on 27 March 2003, and a remixed version of the song was created for release in Italy and Sweden. The song was sent to all major radio stations in the latter two countries and its accompanying music video was put in rotation on Greek music video channel MAD TV. Constantas also promoted the song through several live performances, including at Greece's national final in late February and on Destino a Eurovision, which documented Spain's Eurovision preparation for the year. He later performed at the Mediterranean Party held at a night club in Old Riga in May, singing "Feeling Alive" in both Greek and English. Additional promotional activities took place in Malta and Poland.

== At Eurovision ==
The Eurovision Song Contest 2003 took place at the Skonto Olympic Hall in Riga on 24 May 2003. The draw for running order had previously been held on 29 November 2002 in Riga, with the results being revealed during a delayed broadcast of the proceedings later that day. Cyprus was set to perform ninth, following the entry from Croatia and preceding the entry from Germany. Dress rehearsals for the participants took place beginning on 19 May. A backing vocalist for Cyprus was slightly injured during the first rehearsal, but they were able to continue on schedule. The performance at the contest was introduced by a postcard with Constantas playing football. His stage presence as he sang featured blue tones with the singer and his backing vocalists and dancers wearing all white. For the broadcast, Evi Papamichail provided commentary on RIK 1 television with Pavlos Pavlou on RIK 2 radio.

=== Voting ===
Televoting was an obligatory voting method for all participating countries, which awarded 1, 2, 3, 4, 5, 6, 7, 8, 10 and 12 points to their ten favourite songs, in ascending order. Countries voted in the same order as they had performed. At the end of the voting phase, it was determined that Cyprus had been placed 20th in the field of 26 entries, receiving 15 points in total from three nations, including the maximum 12 points from Greece, which they had also given 12 points to through their public televoting. CyBC appointed Loukas Hamatsos as its spokesperson to present the results of the Cypriot vote.

Points awarded to Cyprus
| Score | Country |
|---|---|
| 12 points | Greece |
| 10 points | |
| 8 points | |
| 7 points | |
| 6 points | |
| 5 points | |
| 4 points | |
| 3 points | |
| 2 points | Malta |
| 1 point | Israel |

Points awarded by Cyprus
| Score | Country |
|---|---|
| 12 points | Greece |
| 10 points | Russia |
| 8 points | Turkey |
| 7 points | Ireland |
| 6 points | Spain |
| 5 points | Iceland |
| 4 points | Austria |
| 3 points | Belgium |
| 2 points | Romania |
| 1 point | Sweden |
