= List of languages in the Eurovision Song Contest =

The following list is of languages used in the Eurovision Song Contest since its inception in 1956, including songs (as) performed in finals and, since 2004, semi-finals.

The rules concerning the language of the entries have been changed several times. In the past, the contest's organisers have sometimes compelled countries to only sing in their own national languages, but since 1999 no such restriction has existed.

== History ==
From 1956 until 1965, there was no rule restricting the language(s) in which the songs could be sung. For example, Ingvar Wixell representing Sweden in 1965, sang his song "Absent Friend" in English. After this, a rule was imposed that a song must be performed in one of the official languages of the country participating. This new language policy remained in place until 1973.

From 1973 to 1976 inclusive, participants were allowed to enter songs in any language. Several winners took advantage of this, with songs in English by countries where other languages are spoken, this included ABBA's "Waterloo" representing Sweden in 1974, and Teach-In's "Ding-a-dong" representing the Netherlands in 1975.

In 1977, the European Broadcasting Union (EBU) reimposed the national language restriction. However, Germany and Belgium were given a special dispensation to use English, as their national song selection procedures were already too advanced to change. During the language rule, the only countries which were allowed to sing in English were Ireland, Malta, and the United Kingdom as English is an official language in those countries. The restriction was imposed from 1977 to 1998.

From 1999 onwards, a free choice of language was again allowed. Since then, several participating broadcasters have chosen songs that mixed languages, often English and the national language of their country. Prior to that, songs such as "Don't Ever Cry" (Croatia 1993), "One Step" (Austria 1997), and "Goodbye" (Bosnia and Herzegovina 1997) had a title and one line of the song in a non-native language. Edyta Górniak, representing Poland in 1994, caused a scandal when she broke the rules by singing her song in English during the dress rehearsal (which is shown to the juries who selected the winner). Only six participating broadcasters demanded that Poland should be disqualified, and with the rules requiring at least 13 of them to complain, the proposed removal did not occur.

Since 2000, some songs have used constructed languages (conlangs): two Belgian entries were entirely written in constructed languages: "Sanomi" in 2003 and "O Julissi" in 2008. "Amambanda", representing the Netherlands in 2006, was sung partly in English and partly in a conlang.

The entry which used the most languages was "It's Just a Game", which represented Norway in 1973. It was performed in English and French, with some lyrics in Spanish, Italian, Dutch, German, Gaelic, Serbo-Croatian, Hebrew, Finnish, Swedish, and Norwegian. "Love Unlimited", representing Bulgaria in 2012, had mainly lyrics in Bulgarian, but with phrases in Turkish, Greek, Spanish, Serbo-Croatian, French, Balkan Romani, Italian, Azerbaijani, Arabic and English. "Pozdrav svijetu", representing Yugoslavia in 1969, was mainly sung in Croatian, but also had phrases in Spanish, German, French, English, Dutch, Italian, Russian, and Finnish.

For the first time since the reintroduction of a free choice of language in 1999, more than half of the entries of the 2025 contest used their representative country's national language. Out of 37 entries, 26 were at least partially in one of their national languages and 11 did not use their national language(s). This was also the first contest since 1998 where less than half of the songs were fully in English, with only 12 fully English-language songs, and 3 of these songs represented countries in which English is an official language (Ireland, Malta and the United Kingdom). After adding the 6 songs which used English in addition to their country's national languages, Estonia and the Netherlands which used English along with other foreign languages and the primarily English-language Australian entry which contained a line in French, 21 songs in total contained English and 16 contained no English lines at all. Sweden was represented by a song in Swedish for the first time since 1998, Germany was represented by a song mainly in German for the first time since 2007, and Latvia was represented by a song entirely in Latvian for the second time in its history, with the other being in 2004.

As of 2026, the only country that has never entered a song completely in one or more of its official, regional or national languages is Azerbaijan, which has never entered a song fully in the Azerbaijani language (although the aforementioned Bulgarian entry "Love Unlimited" contained a line in the language; "Mata Hari", Azerbaijan's 2021 entry, contained a repeated phrase; the chorus of "Özünlə apar", its 2024 entry, is in Azerbaijani; and "Just Go", its 2026 entry, is partially in Azerbaijani). Monaco has never used Monégasque, its traditional national language, but French is Monaco's official and most commonly spoken language, and all of Monaco's entries have been entirely or primarily in French. The country which has gone the longest without using a native language is Sweden, which did not use any from the start of the language rule being lifted in 1999 until "Bara bada bastu", which represented Sweden in 2025. The last time before this that Sweden willingly sent a song in the Swedish language (i.e. without a language rule in place) was in 1963. The country which currently has the longest non-native language streak is Belgium, which has not used any of its three official languages since "Je t'adore", which represented Belgium in 2006, in which the repetition of the title phrase is the only French used. Serbia is the latest non-anglophone country to send a song containing English for the first time, doing so in 2015. It was also the latest non-anglophone country to send a song fully in English for the first time until Luxembourg's 2026 entry, Mother Nature.

On the other hand, as of 2026, there are nine countries whose representatives have performed all their songs at least partially in an official, regional or national language: Andorra, Australia, France, Ireland, Italy, Malta, Monaco, Morocco and the United Kingdom, as well as the two former countries of Serbia and Montenegro and Yugoslavia. In addition, Morocco (Arabic is an official language) and former country Serbia and Montenegro (Serbo-Croatian was an official language) have both only been represented by songs fully in an official language, although these are also the two countries with the fewest number of participations, participating once and twice respectively.

The only editions not to feature any English-language entries were 1956 and 1958, while 2022 was the first time in the history of the event that no entry was performed in French – with the two being the official languages of the contest. In 1956 and 1958, no Anglophone country participated, whereas in 2022, the three Francophone participants entered songs in English (Belgium and Switzerland) and Breton (France) respectively. While non-Francophone countries have in the past sent entries wholly or partially in French, none did so in 2022.

=== Criticism ===
French legislator François-Michel Gonnot criticised broadcaster France Télévisions and launched an official complaint in the French Parliament, as the song which represented France in 2008, "Divine" by Sébastien Tellier, was sung in English. A similar incident occurred again in 2014, when Ruth Lorenzo was criticised by the Royal Spanish Academy after winning the Spanish national selection with her song "Dancing in the Rain", which contained some lyrics in English.

== Spoken languages in the contest ==
The following natural languages have appeared in at least one competing entry in the Eurovision Song Contest:

- Abkhaz
- Albanian; incl.
  - Gheg Albanian
- Arabic
- Aramaic
- Armenian
- Azerbaijani
- Belarusian
- Breton
- Bulgarian
- Catalan
- Corsican
- Crimean Tatar
- Czech
- Danish
- Dutch
- English
- Estonian; incl.
  - Võro
- Finnish; incl.
  - Karelian
- French
- French Creole; incl.
  - Martinican Creole
- Georgian
- German; incl.
  - Mühlviertlerisch
  - Styrian
  - Viennese German
  - Vorarlbergish
- Greek; incl.
  - Ancient Greek
  - Cypriot Greek
  - Pontic Greek
- Hawaiian
- Hebrew
- Hungarian
- Icelandic
- Irish
- Italian; incl.
  - Broccolino
- Latin
- Latvian
- Lithuanian; incl.
  - Samogitian
- Luxembourgish
- Macedonian
- Maltese
- Neapolitan
- Northern Sámi
- Norwegian
- Polish
- Portuguese
- Proto-Slavic
- Romani; incl.
  - Balkan Romani
  - Carpathian Romani
- Romanian
- Romansh
- Russian
- Sanskrit
- Serbo-Croatian; incl.
  - Bosnian
  - Croatian; incl.
    - Chakavian
    - Dalmatian Croatian
  - Montenegrin
  - Serbian; incl.
    - Torlakian
- Slovak
- Slovene
- Spanish; incl.
  - Andalusian Spanish
- Sranan Tongo
- Swahili
- Swedish; incl.
  - Finland Swedish; incl.
    - Vörå Swedish
- Tahitian
- Turkish
- Udmurt
- Ukrainian; incl.
  - Surzhyk
- Yankunytjatjara

Amharic was due to be included for the first time at the cancelled 2020 contest.

== Language families ==
Most Europeans speak one or several Indo-European languages as a first language, second language or both. Of the main branches of Indo-European, Germanic and Romance have been represented at every contest. Balto-Slavic languages, another branch of Indo-European with hundreds of millions of speakers, were first introduced to the contest by Yugoslavia and have become more common after the end of the Cold War as more and more countries with a Slavic national language participated. The Baltic subgroup of Baltoslavic has only sporadically appeared as these languages have few speakers outside Lithuania and Latvia. Smaller branches such as Hellenic languages, Albanoid, Celtic languages (including Breton and Irish), Armenian languages and others have likewise depended on whether the national broadcaster representing that language participates and selects an entry in that language. For example despite Irish being de jure a co-official national language in Ireland, there has been only one Irish-language entry, but two in Breton, a language that has been actively fought against by the French state in the 20th century. While the Indo-Iranian branch of Indo-European includes some of the most spoken languages in the world, few people in EBU member states speak one of those languages and thus their presence at Eurovision thus far has been minimal.

Non-Indo-European languages have been appearing since the 1960s. The first group to appear were the Uralic languages which include Northern Sámi, Finnish, Estonian and Hungarian. In the 1970s Semitic languages (of the wider Afroasiatic family) which have been represented by the Maltese language, Hebrew and various varieties of Arabic first appeared in the contest. The Turkic languages have mostly been represented by Turkey (Azeri which is also a Turkic language has only been used for a few lines in a few songs thus far). As Turkey hasn't participated since 2012, the representation of Turkic languages has decreased. The Pama–Nyungan family of Australian Aboriginal languages was represented by Yankunytjatjara in 2024.

Besides those languages that have notable communities of native speakers in EBU member states, there have been conlangs (languages "made up" by identifiable individuals or groups of individuals in recent times – some of the entries used a conlang devised specifically for that song bordering on glossolalia), languages from outside the EBU area as well as "dead" classical languages such as Ancient Greek, Sanskrit or Classical Latin used for songs, their titles or parts of their lyrics.

== Spoken languages and their first appearance ==
Spoken languages are fully counted below when they are used in at least an entire verse or chorus of a song. First brief uses of a language and first uses of dialects are also noted.

Order	Language	First appearance	Country	First performer	First song
1	Dutch	1956	Netherlands	Jetty Paerl	"De vogels van Holland"
2	German	1956	Switzerland	Lys Assia	"Das alte Karussell"
3	French	1956	Belgium	Fud Leclerc	"Messieurs les noyés de la Seine"
4	Italian	1956	Italy	Franca Raimondi	"Aprite le finestre"
5	English	1957	United Kingdom	Patricia Bredin	"All"
–	phrases in Spanish	1957	Germany	Margot Hielscher	"Telefon, Telefon"
6	Danish	1957	Denmark	Birthe Wilke and Gustav Winckler	"Skibet skal sejle i nat"
7	Swedish	1958	Sweden	Alice Babs	"Lilla stjärna"
8	Luxembourgish	1960	Luxembourg	Camillo Felgen	"So laang we's du do bast"
9	Norwegian	1960	Norway	Nora Brockstedt	"Voi Voi"
–	title in Northern Sámi	1960	Norway	Nora Brockstedt	"Voi Voi"
10	Spanish	1961	Spain	Conchita Bautista	"Estando contigo"
11	Finnish	1961	Finland	Laila Kinnunen	"Valoa ikkunassa"
12	Serbo-Croatian (Note: Serbo-Croatian is the name given to the pluricentric language to which Croatian, Bosnian, Serbian and Montenegrin belong. At the time of Yugoslavia's existence there was little distinction between the four standard varieties: the term Croatian came into use during the 1970s; Serbian and Bosnian evolved politically in the 1990s, and Montenegrin in the 2000s (see Serbo-Croatian for more details). Varying sources outline the language in which Yugoslav entries were performed differently, and another view is that the first entry performed by an artist from each Yugoslav constituent republic can be considered the first for their respective languages: "Neke davne zvezde" for Serbian in 1961, "Brodovi" for Croatian in 1963, "Život je sklopio krug" for Bosnian in 1964, and "Džuli" for Montenegrin in 1983.)	1961	Yugoslavia	Ljiljana Petrović	"Neke davne zvezde" (Неке давне звезде)
13	Portuguese	1964	Portugal	António Calvário	"Oração"
14	Slovene	1966	Yugoslavia	Berta Ambrož	"Brez besed"
–	phrases in Russian	1969	Yugoslavia	Ivan and 4M	"Pozdrav svijetu" (Поздрав свијету)
–	Viennese German	1971	Austria	Marianne Mendt	"Musik"
15	Maltese	1971	Malta	Joe Grech	"Marija l-Maltija"
16	Irish	1972	Ireland	Sandie Jones	"Ceol an Ghrá"
17	Hebrew	1973	Israel	Ilanit	"Ey Sham" (אי שם)
18	Greek	1974	Greece	Marinella	"Krasi, thalassa kai t'agori mou" (Κρασί, θάλασσα και τ'αγόρι μου)
19	Turkish	1975	Turkey	Semiha Yankı	"Seninle Bir Dakika"
–	title in Latin	1977	Finland	Monica Aspelund	"Lapponia"
20	Arabic	1980	Morocco	Samira Said	"Bitaqat Hub" (بطاقة حب)
–	phrases in Northern Sámi	1980	Norway	Sverre Kjelsberg and Mattis Hætta	"Sámiid ædnan"
21	Icelandic	1986	Iceland	ICY	"Gleðibankinn"
22	Romansh	1989	Switzerland	Furbaz	"Viver senza tei"
–	Finland Swedish	1990	Finland	Beat	"Fri?"
23	Neapolitan	1991	Italy	Peppino di Capri	"Comme è ddoce 'o mare"
24	Martinican Creole	1992	France	Kali	"Monté la riviè"
25	Serbian (variety of Serbo-Croatian)	1992	(Federal Republic of Yugoslavia) Yugoslavia	Extra Nena	"Ljubim te pesmama" (Љубим те песмама)
–	phrases in Corsican	1993	France	Patrick Fiori	"Mama Corsica"
26	Bosnian (variety of Serbo-Croatian)	1993	Bosnia and Herzegovina	Fazla	"Sva bol svijeta"
27	Croatian (variety of Serbo-Croatian)	1993	Croatia	Put	"Don't Ever Cry"
28	Estonian	1994	Estonia	Silvi Vrait	"Nagu merelaine"
29	Romanian	1994	Romania	Dan Bittman	"Dincolo de nori"
30	Slovak	1994	Slovakia	Martin Ďurinda and Tublatanka	"Nekonečná pieseň"
31	Lithuanian	1994	Lithuania	Ovidijus Vyšniauskas	"Lopšinė mylimai"
32	Hungarian	1994	Hungary	Friderika Bayer	"Kinek mondjam el vétkeimet?"
33	Russian	1994	Russia	Youddiph	"Vechny strannik" (Вечный стрaнник)
34	Polish	1994	Poland	Edyta Górniak	"To nie ja!"
–	phrases in Ancient Greek	1995	Greece	Elina Konstantopoulou	"Pia prosefhi" (Ποιά προσευχή)
–	Vorarlbergish	1996	Austria	George Nussbaumer	"Weil's dr guat got"
35	Breton	1996	France	Dan Ar Braz and l'Héritage des Celtes	"Diwanit Bugale"
36	Macedonian	1998	Macedonia	Vlado Janevski	"Ne zori, zoro" (Не зори, зоро)
–	Samogitian	1999	Lithuania	Aistė	"Strazdas"
–	Styrian	2003	Austria	Alf Poier	"Weil der Mensch zählt"
37	Constructed language	2003	Belgium	Urban Trad	"Sanomi"
38	Latvian	2004	Latvia	Fomins and Kleins	"Dziesma par laimi"
39	Catalan	2004	Andorra	Marta Roure	"Jugarem a estimar-nos"
40	lines in Ukrainian	2004	Ukraine	Ruslana	"Wild Dances"
41	Võro	2004	Estonia	Neiokõsõ	"Tii"
42	Montenegrin (variety of Serbo-Croatian)	2005	Serbia and Montenegro	No Name	"Zauvijek moja" (Заувијек моја)
43	Albanian	2006	Albania	Luiz Ejlli	"Zjarr e ftohtë"
–	phrases in Tahitian	2006	Monaco	Séverine Ferrer	"La Coco-Dance"
–	phrases in Andalusian Spanish	2006	Spain	Las Ketchup	"Bloody Mary"
–	phrases in Dalmatian Croatian	2006	Croatia	Severina	"Moja štikla"
44	Bulgarian	2007	Bulgaria	Elitsa Todorova and Stoyan Yankoulov	"Water"
45	Czech	2007	Czech Republic	Kabát	"Malá dáma"
46	lines in Armenian	2007	Armenia	Hayko	"Anytime You Need"
–	lines in Surzhyk	2007	Ukraine	Verka Serduchka	"Dancing Lasha Tumbai"
–	phrases in Carpathian Romani	2009	Czech Republic	Gipsy.cz	"Aven Romale"
–	phrases in Karelian	2010	Finland	Kuunkuiskaajat	"Työlki ellää"
47	lines in Swahili	2011	Norway	Stella Mwangi	"Haba Haba"
48	Corsican	2011	France	Amaury Vassili	"Sognu"
–	phrases in Gheg Albanian	2012	Albania	Rona Nishliu	"Suus"
49	Udmurt	2012	Russia	Buranovskiye Babushki	"Party for Everybody"
–	Mühlviertlerisch	2012	Austria	Trackshittaz	"Woki mit deim Popo"
–	phrases in Azerbaijani	2012	Bulgaria	Sofi Marinova	"Love Unlimited"
–	phrases in Georgian	2012	Georgia	Anri Jokhadze	"I'm a Joker"
50	lines in Balkan Romani	2013	Macedonia	Esma and Lozano	"Pred da se razdeni" (Пред да се раздени)
–	Chakavian	2013	Croatia	Klapa s Mora	"Mižerja"
–	lines in Pontic Greek	2016	Greece	Argo	"Utopian Land"
51	lines in Crimean Tatar	2016	Ukraine	Jamala	"1944"
52	Belarusian	2017	Belarus	Naviband	"Historyja majho žyccia" (Гісторыя майго жыцця)
–	phrases in Sanskrit	2017	Italy	Francesco Gabbani	"Occidentali's Karma"
53	Georgian	2018	Georgia	Ethno-Jazz Band Iriao	"For You"
–	phrases in Torlakian	2018	Serbia	Sanja Ilić and Balkanika	"Nova deca" (Нова деца)
–	phrases in Abkhaz	2019	Georgia	Oto Nemsadze	"Keep on Going"
–	lines in Amharic	2020	Israel	Eden Alene	"Feker Libi" (ፍቅር ልቤ)
54	lines in Sranan Tongo	2021	Netherlands	Jeangu Macrooy	"Birth of a New Age"
55	lines in Latin	2022	Serbia	Konstrakta	"In corpore sano"
56	lines in Yankunytjatjara	2024	Australia	Electric Fields	"One Milkali (One Blood)"
57	lines in Azerbaijani	2024	Azerbaijan	Fahree feat. Ilkin Dovlatov	"Özünlə apar"
–	lines in Broccolino	2025	Estonia	Tommy Cash	"Espresso Macchiato"
–	phrases in Proto-Slavic	2025	Poland	Justyna Steczkowska	"Gaja"
–	Vörå Swedish	2025	Sweden	KAJ	"Bara bada bastu"
–	lines in Cypriot Greek	2026	Cyprus	Antigoni	"Jalla"
–	title and words in Jamaican Patois	2026	Bulgaria	Dara	"Bangaranga"
–	words in Hawaiian	2026	Moldova	Satoshi	"Viva, Moldova!"

== Winners by language ==
1. English (48.8%)
2. French (19.8%)
3. Dutch (3.96%)
4. Italian (3.96%)
5. Hebrew (3.96%)
6. German (2.64%)
7. Spanish (2.64%)
8. Swedish (2.64%)
9. Norwegian (2.64%)
10. Ukrainian (2.64%)
11. Danish (1.32%)
12. Serbo-Croatian (1.32%)
13. Serbian (1.32%)
14. Crimean Tatar (1.32%)
15. Portuguese (1.32%)

Between 1966 and 1972, and again between 1977 and 1998, countries were only permitted to perform in an official, national, or regional language of their country. Since language restrictions were last lifted in 1999, only four songs in non-English languages have won: "Molitva" (Serbia 2007) wan performed in Serbian, "Amar pelos dois" (Portugal 2017) in Portuguese, "Zitti e buoni" (Italy 2021) in Italian, and "Stefania" (Ukraine 2022) in Ukrainian. Also, the winning entries for Ukraine in 2004 and 2016 combined lyrics in English with Ukrainian and Crimean Tatar, respectively.

In 2017, "Amar pelos dois" became the first Portuguese-language song to win the contest, the first winner since 2007 to both be in a language that had never produced a winning song before and be entirely in a language other than English. Among all Eurovision winning entries, only Ukraine's were performed (intermixed lyrics in one version) in more than one language.

2021 was the first year since 1995, and the first since language restrictions were last lifted in 1999, that the top three songs were all sung in a non-English language: Italian (first) and French (second and third).

Wins	Language(s)	Years	Countries
37	English	1967, 1969, 1970, 1974, 1975, 1976, 1980, 1981, 1987, 1992, 1993, 1994, 1996, 1997, 1999, 2000, 2001, 2002, 2003, 2004, 2005, 2006, 2008, 2009, 2010, 2011, 2012, 2013, 2014, 2015, 2016, 2018, 2019, 2023, 2024, 2025, 2026	United Kingdom, Ireland, Sweden, Netherlands, Denmark, Estonia, Latvia, Turkey, Ukraine, Greece, Finland, Russia, Norway, Germany, Azerbaijan, Austria, Israel, Switzerland, Bulgaria
15	French	1956, 1958, 1960, 1961, 1962, 1965, 1966, 1969, 1971, 1972, 1973, 1977, 1983, 1986, 1988	Switzerland, France, Luxembourg, Monaco, Belgium
3	Dutch	1957, 1959, 1969	Netherlands
3	Italian	1964, 1990, 2021	Italy
3	Hebrew	1978, 1979, 1998	Israel
2
2	German	1966, 1982	Austria, Germany
2	Spanish	1968, 1969	Spain
2	Swedish	1984, 1991	Sweden
2	Norwegian	1985, 1995	Norway
2	Ukrainian	2004, 2022	Ukraine
1	Danish	1963	Denmark
1	Serbo-Croatian	1989	Yugoslavia
1	Serbian	2007	Serbia
1	Crimean Tatar	2016	Ukraine
1	Portuguese	2017	Portugal

== Entries in constructed languages ==
Three times in the history of the contest, songs have been sung, wholly or partially, in constructed languages or gibberish.

Appearance	Country	Performer	Song
2003	Belgium	Urban Trad	"Sanomi"
2006	Netherlands	Treble	"Amambanda"
2008	Belgium	Ishtar	"O Julissi"

== Performances with sign languages ==
Some performances have included phrases in sign languages on stage. As of 2026, there have been 5 sign languages used, and they have all been from the French Sign Language family.

Appearance	Country	Sign language	Performer	Song	Ref
2005	Latvia	Latvian Sign Language	Walters & Kazha	"The War Is Not Over"	
2006	Poland	Polish Sign Language	Ich Troje	"Follow My Heart"	
2011	Lithuania	Lithuanian Sign Language	Evelina Sašenko	"C'est ma vie"	
2015	Serbia	Yugoslav Sign Language	Bojana Stamenov	"Beauty Never Lies"	
2019	France	French Sign Language	Bilal Hassani	"Roi"	
2026	Lithuania	Lithuanian Sign Language	Lion Ceccah	"Sólo quiero más"	

== See also ==
- List of languages in the Junior Eurovision Song Contest

== Notes and references ==
=== Bibliography ===
- Eurovision Song Contest history. Eurovision.tv. Retrieved on 19 August 2007.
- History. ESCtoday.com. Retrieved on 19 August 2007.
- John Kennedy O'Connor (2005). The Eurovision Song Contest 50 Years The Official History. London: Carlton Books Limited. ISBN 1-84442-586-X.
- O'Connor, John Kennedy (2005). The Eurovision Song Contest 50 Years The Official History. London: Carlton Books Limited. ISBN 1-84442-586-X.
- "Historical Milestones". eurovision.tv. 2005. Archived from the original on 2006-05-26.
- "Urban Trad". UrbanTrad.com. 28 September 2004. Archived from the original on 8 February 2007.
- "Treble will represent the Netherlands". eurovision.tv. Archived from the original on 2006-05-25.
- Klier, Marcus (2008-03-09). "Belgium: Ishtar to Eurovision". ESCToday.
