= Belgium in the Eurovision Song Contest 2004 =

- Eurovision Song Contest 2004
- Participating broadcaster: Vlaamse Radio- en Televisieomroeporganisatie (VRT)
- Country: Belgium
- Selection process: Eurosong '04
- Selection date: 15 February 2004

Competing entry
- Song: "1 Life"
- Artist: Xandee
- Songwriters: Marc Paelinck; Dirk Paelinck

Placement
- Final result: 22nd, 7 points

Participation chronology

Belgium was represented at the Eurovision Song Contest 2004 with the song "1 Life", composed by Marc Paelinck, with lyrics by Dirk Paelinck, and performed by Xandee. The Belgian participating broadcaster, Flemish Vlaamse Radio- en Televisieomroeporganisatie (VRT), selected its entry for the contest through the national final Eurosong '04. The competition featured twenty-eight competing entries and consisted of five shows. In the final on 15 February 2004, "1 Life" performed by Xandee was selected as the winner via the votes of five voting groups.

As one of ten highest placed finishers in the 2003 contest, Belgium directly qualified to compete in the final of the Eurovision Song Contest which took place on 15 May 2004. Performing in position 13, Belgium placed twenty-second out of the 24 participating countries with 7 points.

== Background ==
Prior to the 2004 contest, Belgium had participated in the Eurovision Song Contest forty-five times since its debut as one of seven countries to take part in 1956. Since then, they have won the contest on one occasion in 1986 with the song "J'aime la vie", performed by Sandra Kim. In 2003, "Sanomi" performed by Urban Trad placed second in the final—Belgium's best result in the contest since their victory in 1986.

The Belgian participation in the contest alternates between two broadcasters: Flemish Vlaamse Radio- en Televisieomroeporganisatie (VRT) and Walloon Radio-télévision belge de la Communauté française (RTBF) at the time, with both broadcasters sharing the broadcasting rights. Both broadcasters –and their predecessors– had selected the Belgian entry using national finals and internal selections in the past. VRT had the turn to participate in 2004. In 2002, VRT organised the national final Eurosong in order to select the entry, while in 2003, RTBF internally selected both the artist and song. On 19 September 2003, VRT confirmed its participation in the 2004 contest and announced that the Eurosong national final would be held to select its entry.

== Before Eurovision ==
=== Eurosong '04 ===
Eurosong '04 was the national final organised by VRT to select its entry in the Eurovision Song Contest 2004. The competition consisted of five shows that commenced on 18 January 2004 and concluded with a final on 15 February 2004 where the winning song and artist were selected. All shows took place at the Studio 100 in Schelle, hosted by Bart Peeters and broadcast on TV1.

==== Format ====
Twenty-eight entries were selected to compete in Eurosong. Four semi-finals took place on 18 January 2004, 25 January 2004, 1 February 2004 and 8 February 2004 with each show featuring seven entries. The winner of each semi-final qualified to the final, and the three highest scoring second placed acts in the semi-finals were also selected to advance. The final took place on 15 February 2004 where the winner was chosen. The results of all shows were determined by an expert jury, an international jury, voting on Radio 2 and Radio Donna and public televoting. Each voting group had an equal stake in the result during all shows with the exception of the public televote which had a weighting equal to the votes of two groups. For the radio voting, listeners of the two stations were able to vote in advance prior to each of the five shows via televoting between Tuesday and Friday and their votes were combined with a jury consisting of representatives from the respective stations (due to a technical problem, the public votes of the Radio 2 jury are unable to counted in the fourth semi-final and instead come entirely from the Radio 2 jury). Each show was broadcast in two parts: in the first part, the songs were performed and the results of the expert jury were announced; after the first part an episode of Witse was aired while the rest of the results were being collected; and in the second part, the results of the international jury and three public voting groups were announced.

During each of the five shows, the expert jury provided commentary and feedback to the artists as well as selected entries to advance in the competition. The experts were:

- Dana Winner – singer
- Marcel Vanthilt – singer and television presenter
- André Vermeulen – Belgian commentator at the Eurovision Song Contest
- Serge Simonart – journalist at HUMO

==== Competing entries ====
A submission period was opened on 19 September 2003 for artists and songwriters to submit their entries until 24 November 2003. On 10 December 2003, VRT held a press conference at the Reyerslaan in Schaerbeek where the twenty-eight acts selected for the competition from a record number of 360 entries received during the submission period were announced. Among the competing artists were former Eurovision Song Contest participants Nicole and Hugo, who represented Belgium in 1973, and Barbara Dex, who represented Belgium in 1993.

Artist	Song	Songwriter(s)
Amaryllis Temmerman	"God in alle eenvoud"	Amaryllis Temmerman, David Poltrock
Astrid	"Don't Stop the Music"	Dirk Paelinck, Marc Paelinck
Barbara Dex and Alides	"One Life"	Alides Hidding, Barbara Dex
Biba Binoche	"Je chante pour toi"	Marianne Velvekens, Marc Requile, Frank Jordens
Chris D. Morton	"Every Dead Soldier"	Chris D. Morton, Dick B. Morton, Alain Croisy
CLIC	"Vieze ouwe venten"	Alain Vande Putte, Tracy Atkins
De Egels	"Maria Maria Maria"	Thomas Selis
Elsie Moraïs	"Amorè loco"	Piet van den Heuvel, Roel de Ruijter
Eva	"Angels"	Dirk Paelinck, Marc Paelinck
Garry Hagger	"I Will Choose You"	John Terra, Daniel Gijbels, Guy Balbaert
Katia Berlingieri	"Don't Be Scared"	Katia Berlingieri, Wim Claes
Kurt	"My Heart"	Kurt Lotgiers
Marjolein	"Say Love"	Dirk Paelinck, Marc Paelinck
Natalia	"Higher Than the Sun"	Yurek Onzia, Vincent Pierens
Nicole and Hugo	"Love Is All Around"	Miguel Wiels, Alain Vande Putte, Peter Gillis
Peter Elkins	"Cry Love"	Peter Elkins, Sebastiaan Bouckaert
Quatro	"Never Say Goodbye"	Gregory Bilsen, Marc Paelinck
Raf van Brussel	"Chemistry"	Raf van Brussel
Raffaele	"Freakin' Destiny"	Raffaele Vertrugno, Fred Bekky
Roxane	"Television Game"	Danny van Wauwe, Edmond’s Jegers
Sodapop	"Time to Party"	Lex De Groot, Piet Van Den Heuvel, Roel De Ruijter
Sofie Van Moll	"Kerosene"	Piet Van Den Heuvel
Spring	"Jan zonder vrees"	Danny Verbiest, Hans Bourlon, Gert Verhulst
Storm	"Jij (hoort bij mij)"	Niels Megens, M. Flamman
The Acrolls	"The Happy Song"	Marino Van Ysacker
X-Elementz	"Innocent"	Nima Farbod, Nary Farbod
Xandee	"1 Life"	Dirk Paelinck, Marc Paelinck
Yanah	"Yes or No"	Eric Geurts, Nathalie Vangronsvelt

==== Semi-finals ====
The four semi-finals took place on 18 January, 25 January, 1 February and 8 February 2004. In each show seven entries competed and the combination of results from two jury groups, two radio voting groups and a public televote determined the winner that qualified to the final. The three highest scoring second placed acts in the semi-finals also proceeded to the final.

Semi-final 1 – 18 January 2004
R/O	Artist	Song	Jury	Radio	Televote	Total	Place
1	Yanah	"Yes or No"	5	8	4	17	5
2	Chris D. Morton	"Every Dead Soldier"	10	8	10	28	3
3	De Egels	"Maria Maria Maria"	2	5	6	13	7
4	Katia Berlingieri	"Don't Be Scared"	10	7	8	25	4
5	Xandee	"1 Life"	18	18	18	54	1
6	Storm	"Jij (hoort bij mij)"	6	8	2	16	6
7	Nicole and Hugo	"Love Is All Around"	11	8	14	33	2

Detailed Jury Votes
R/O	Song	Expert Jury	International Jury	Total
1	"Yes Or No"	2	3	5
2	"Every Dead Soldier"	5	5	10
3	"Maria Maria Maria"	1	1	2
4	"Don't Be Scared"	3	7	10
5	"1 Life"	9	9	18
6	"Jij (hoort bij mij)"	4	2	6
7	"Love Is All Around"	7	4	11

Detailed Radio Votes
R/O	Song	Radio 2	Donna	Total
1	"Yes or No"	4	4	8
2	"Every Dead Soldier"	3	5	8
3	"Maria Maria Maria"	2	3	5
4	"Don't Be Scared"	5	2	7
5	"1 Life"	9	9	18
6	"Jij (hoort bij mij)"	1	7	8
7	"Love Is All Around"	7	1	8

Semi-final 2 – 25 January 2004
R/O	Artist	Song	Jury	Radio	Televote	Total	Place
1	Quatro	"Never Say Goodbye"	8	10	8	26	4
2	Kurt	"My Heart"	5	2	2	9	7
3	Sofie Van Moll	"Kerosene"	8	18	10	36	3
4	Raf van Brussel	"Chemistry"	14	14	14	42	2
5	CLIC	"Vieze ouwe venten"	3	5	4	12	6
6	Biba Binoche	"Je chante pour toi"	6	6	6	18	5
7	Elsie Moraïs	"Amorè loco"	18	7	18	43	1

Detailed Jury Votes
R/O	Song	Expert Jury	International Jury	Total
1	"Never Say Goodbye"	4	4	8
2	"My Heart"	2	3	5
3	"Kerosene"	3	5	8
4	"Chemistry"	7	7	14
5	"Vieze ouwe venten"	1	2	3
6	"Je chante pour toi"	5	1	6
7	"Amorè loco"	9	9	18

Detailed Radio Votes
R/O	Song	Radio 2	Donna	Total
1	"Never Say Goodbye"	5	5	10
2	"My Heart"	1	1	2
3	"Kerosene"	9	9	18
4	"Chemistry"	7	7	4
5	"Vieze ouwe venten"	3	2	5
6	"Je chante pour toi"	2	4	6
7	"Amorè loco"	4	3	7

Semi-final 3 – 1 February 2004
R/O	Artist	Song	Jury	Radio	Televote	Total	Place
1	Astrid	"Don't Stop the Music"	14	14	10	38	2
2	Raffaele	"Freakin' Destiny"	5	5	2	12	7
3	The Acrolls	"The Happy Song"	4	8	8	20	5
4	Roxane	"Television Game"	18	13	18	49	1
5	Garry Hagger	"I Will Choose You"	7	2	4	13	6
6	Marjolein	"Say Love"	9	6	6	21	4
7	Spring	"Jan zonder vrees"	5	14	14	33	3

Detailed Jury Votes
R/O	Song	Expert Jury	International Jury	Total
1	"Don't Stop the Music"	7	7	14
2	"Freakin' Destiny"	1	4	5
3	"The Happy Song"	3	1	4
4	"Television Game"	9	9	18
5	"I Will Choose You"	5	2	7
6	"Say Love"	4	5	9
7	"Jan zonder vrees"	2	3	5

Detailed Radio Votes
R/O	Song	Radio 2	Donna	Total
1	"Don't Stop the Music"	9	5	14
2	"Freakin' Destiny"	3	2	5
3	"The Happy Song"	5	3	8
4	"Television Game"	4	9	13
5	"I Will Choose You"	1	1	2
6	"Say Love"	2	4	6
7	"Jan zonder vrees"	7	7	14

Semi-final 4 – 8 February 2004
R/O	Artist	Song	Jury	Radio	Televote	Total	Place
1	Eva	"Angels"	7	7	6	20	4
2	Sodapop	"Time to Party"	2	6	4	12	6
3	Amaryllis Temmerman	"God in alle eenvoud"	5	5	2	12	6
4	Peter Elkins	"Cry Love"	10	8	8	26	3
5	Natalia	"Higher Than the Sun"	14	18	18	50	1
6	X-Elementz	"Innocent"	6	4	10	20	4
7	Barbara Dex and Alides	"One Life"	18	14	14	46	2

Detailed Jury Votes
R/O	Song	Expert Jury	International Jury	Total
1	"Angels"	4	3	7
2	"Time to Party"	1	1	2
3	"God in alle eenvoud"	3	2	5
4	"Cry Love"	5	5	10
5	"Higher Than the Sun"	7	7	14
6	"Innocent"	2	4	6
7	"One Life"	9	9	18

Detailed Radio Votes
R/O	Song	Radio 2	Donna	Total
1	"Angels"	3	4	7
2	"Time to Party"	1	5	6
3	"God in alle eenvoud"	4	1	5
4	"Cry Love"	5	3	8
5	"Higher Than the Sun"	9	9	18
6	"Innocent"	2	2	4
7	"One Life"	7	7	14

==== Final ====
The final took place on 15 February 2004 where the seven entries that qualified from the preceding four semi-finals competed. The winner, "1 Life" performed by Xandee, was selected by the combination of results from two jury groups, two radio voting groups and a public televote.

Final – 15 February 2004
R/O	Artist	Song	Jury	Radio	Televote	Total	Place
1	Roxane	"Television Game"	6	8	6	20	5
2	Barbara Dex and Alides	"One Life"	9	11	10	30	3
3	Elsie Moraïs	"Amorè loco"	12	6	8	26	4
4	Astrid	"Don't Stop the Music"	2	4	2	8	7
5	Xandee	"1 Life"	18	14	18	50	1
6	Raf van Brussel	"Chemistry"	5	5	4	14	6
7	Natalia	"Higher Than the Sun"	10	14	14	38	2

Detailed Jury Votes
R/O	Song	Expert Jury	International Jury	Total
1	"Television Game"	4	2	6
2	"One Life"	5	4	9
3	"Amorè loco"	7	5	12
4	"Don't Stop the Music"	1	1	2
5	"1 Life"	9	9	18
6	"Chemistry"	2	3	5
7	"Higher Than the Sun"	3	7	10

Detailed Radio Votes
R/O	Song	Radio 2	Donna	Total
1	"Television Game"	1	7	8
2	"One Life"	7	4	11
3	"Amorè loco"	4	2	6
4	"Don't Stop the Music"	3	1	4
5	"1 Life"	9	5	14
6	"Chemistry"	2	3	5
7	"Higher than the Sun"	5	9	14

==== Ratings ====
Viewing figures by show
Show	Date	Viewing figures		Ref.
Show	Date	Nominal	Share	Ref.
Semi-final 1	18 January 2004	1,504,000	58.9%	
Semi-final 2	25 January 2004	1,643,000	57.5%	
Semi-final 3	1 February 2004	1,494,000	52.7%	
Semi-final 4	8 February 2004	1,777,000	—N/a	
Final	15 February 2004	1,914,000	65.3%	

== At Eurovision ==
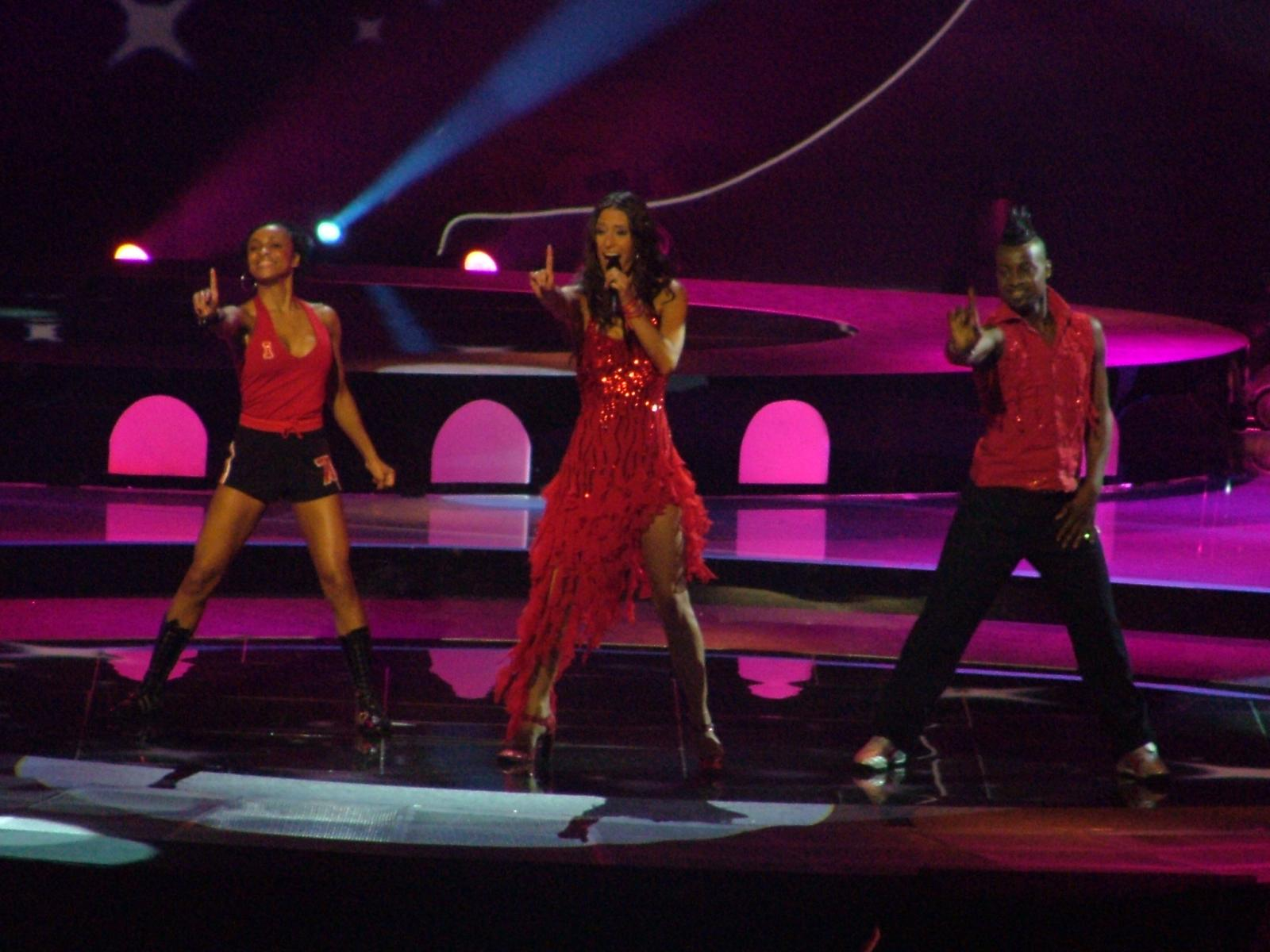
Xandee during a rehearsal before the final

It was announced that the competition's format would be expanded to include a semi-final in 2004. According to the rules, all nations with the exceptions of the host country, the "Big Four" (France, Germany, Spain and the United Kingdom) and the ten highest placed finishers in the 2003 contest are required to qualify from the semi-final in order to compete for the final; the top ten countries from the semi-final progress to the final. As Belgium finished second in the 2003 contest, the nation automatically qualified to compete in the final on 15 May 2004. On 23 March 2004, a special allocation draw was held which determined the running order and Belgium was set to perform in position 13 in the final, following the entry from Bosnia and Herzegovina and before the entry from Russia. Despite being considered a favourite to win the whole competition, Belgium placed twenty-second in the final, scoring 7 points.

The semi-final and the final were broadcast in Belgium by both the Flemish and Walloon broadcasters. VRT broadcast the shows on TV1 with commentary in Dutch by Bart Peeters and André Vermeulen. RTBF televised the shows on La Une with commentary in French by Jean-Pierre Hautier. All shows were also broadcast by VRT on Radio 2 with commentary in Dutch by Michel Follet and Sven Pichal, and by RTBF on La Première with commentary in French by Patrick Duhamel and Serges Otthiers. VRT appointed Martine Prenen as its spokesperson to announce the Belgian votes during the final.

=== Voting ===
Below is a breakdown of points awarded to Belgium and awarded by Belgium in the semi-final and grand final of the contest. The nation awarded its 12 points to the Netherlands in the semi-final and to Turkey in the final of the contest.

Following the release of the televoting figures by the EBU after the conclusion of the competition, it was revealed that a total of 97,520 televotes were cast in Belgium during the two shows: 21,397 votes during the semi-final and 76,123 votes during the final.

==== Points awarded to Belgium ====
Points awarded to Belgium (Final)
Score	Country
12 points	
10 points	
8 points	
7 points	
6 points	
5 points	Netherlands
4 points	
3 points	
2 points	
1 point	Andorra; Cyprus

==== Points awarded by Belgium ====
Points awarded by Belgium (Semi-final)
Score	Country
12 points	Netherlands
10 points	Greece
8 points	Ukraine
7 points	Serbia and Montenegro
6 points	Cyprus
5 points	Albania
4 points	Portugal
3 points	Bosnia and Herzegovina
2 points	Israel
1 point	Finland

Points awarded by Belgium (Final)
Score	Country
12 points	Turkey
10 points	France
8 points	Greece
7 points	Spain
6 points	Netherlands
5 points	Ukraine
4 points	Cyprus
3 points	Serbia and Montenegro
2 points	Sweden
1 point	Albania
