= Merci, Chérie =

1966 single by Udo Jürgens

Single by Udo Jürgens

from the album Chansons
- Language: German
- B-side: "Das Ist Nicht Gut Für Mich"
- Released: 1966
- Genre: Ballad
- Label: Vogue
- Composer: Udo Jürgens
- Lyricists: Udo Jürgens; Thomas Hörbiger

Music video
- "Merci, Chérie" on YouTube

Eurovision Song Contest 1966 entry
- Country: Austria
- Artist: Udo Jürgens
- Language: German
- Composer: Udo Jürgens
- Lyricists: Udo Jürgens; Thomas Hörbiger
- Conductor: Hans Hammerschmid

Finals performance
- Final result: 1st
- Final points: 31

Entry chronology
- ◄ "Sag ihr, ich lass sie grüßen" (1965)
- "Warum es hunderttausend Sterne gibt" (1967) ►

Official performance video
- "Merci, Chérie" on YouTube

"Merci, Chérie" (French pronunciation: [mɛʁsi ʃeʁi]; "Thank you, darling") is a song composed and recorded by Austrian singer Udo Jürgens with lyrics by himself and Thomas Hörbiger. It represented Austria in the Eurovision Song Contest 1966, held in Luxembourg, resulting in the country's first ever win at the contest.

== Background ==
=== Conception ===
"Merci, Chérie" was composed by Udo Jürgens with lyrics by himself and Thomas Hörbiger. It is an earnest ballad in which the singer, as he leaves her, thanks his lover for good times and positive memories. In addition to the original German version with phrases in French, Jürgens recorded the song fully in French, English, Japanese –メルシー・シェリー, "Merushī sherī"–, Italian –with lyrics by Vito Pallavicini–, and Spanish –with lyrics by Arturo Kaps-Schönfeld–.

=== Eurovision ===
Österreichischer Rundfunk (ORF) internally selected "Merci, Chérie" as its entry for the 11th edition of the Eurovision Song Contest.

On 5 March 1966, the Eurovision Song Contest was held at Villa Louvigny in Luxembourg hosted by the Compagnie Luxembourgeoise de Télédiffusion (CLT), and broadcast live throughout the continent. Jürgens performed "Merci, Chérie" ninth on the evening, following Portugal's "Ele e ela" by Madalena Iglésias and preceding Sweden's "Nygammal vals" by Lill Lindfors and Svante Thuresson. Hans Hammerschmid conducted the event's orchestra in the performance of the Austrian entry.

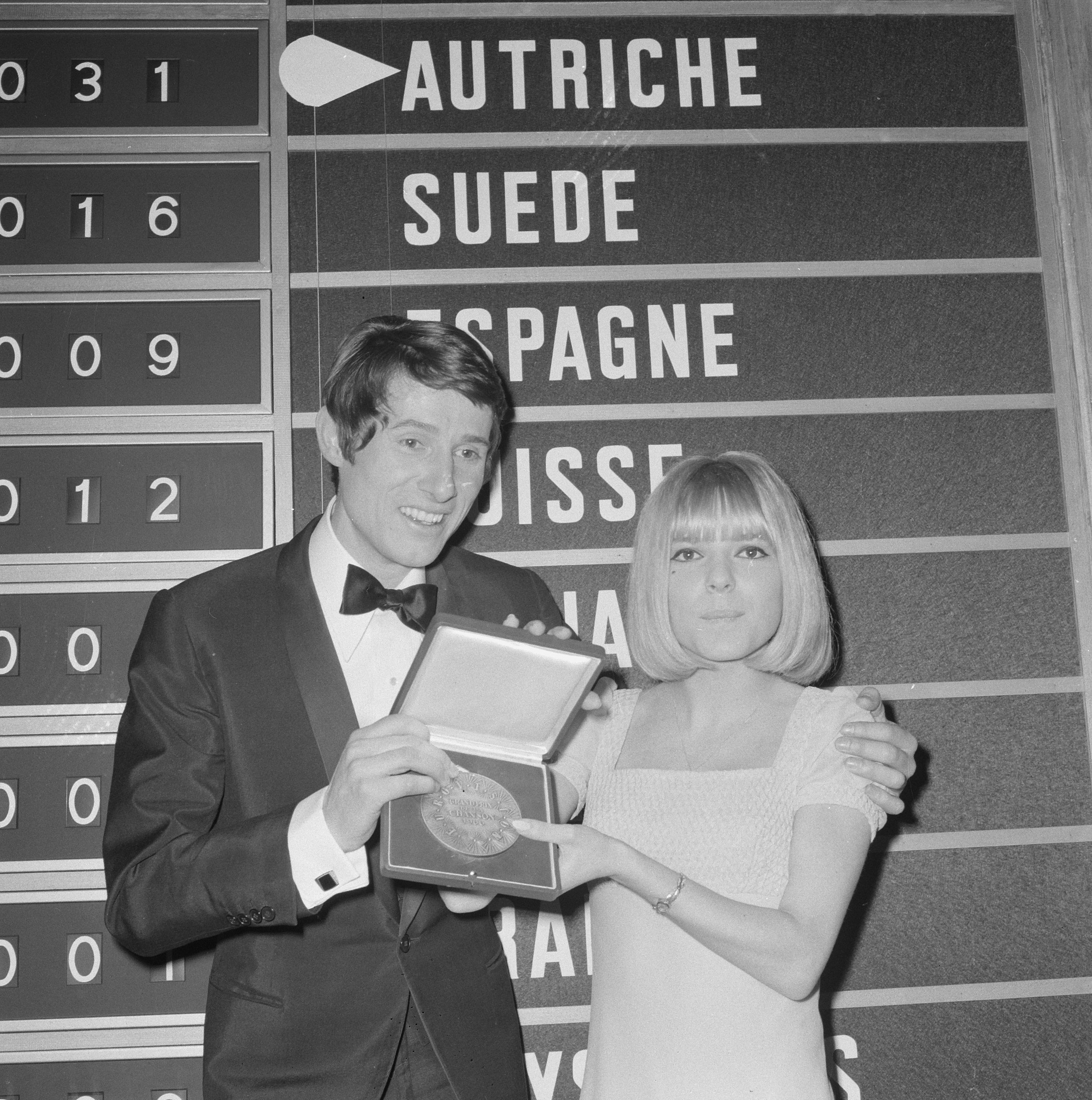
1965 winner, France Gall, presents the winner's medal to Jürgens.

At the close of voting, "Merci, Chérie" received 31 points, securing it first place at the head of an eighteen-entry field. This was the first time that Austria won Eurovision and the only time until 2014 when Rise Like a Phoenix" by Conchita Wurst won. As of 2025 the song is one of only two winning entries sung mostly or entirely in German –the other was 1982's "Ein bißchen Frieden" by Nicole representing Germany–. Jürgens was the last solo male pianist to win the contest until Duncan Laurence won in 2019 with "Arcade".

The song was succeeded as contest winner in 1967 by "Puppet on a String" by Sandie Shaw for the United Kingdom, and as the Austrian entry in that year by "Warum es hunderttausend Sterne gibt" by Peter Horten.

=== Aftermath ===
Jürgens performed his song in the Eurovision twenty-fifth anniversary show Songs of Europe held on 22 August 1981 in Mysen. The opening act of the Eurovision Song Contest 2015 grand final held in Vienna features violinist Lidia Baich, winner of the Eurovision Young Musicians 1998, performing live on stage an excerpt of "Merci, Chérie" in tribute to Jürgens.

== Chart performance ==
=== Weekly charts ===
Chart (1966)	Peak position
Austria (Ö3 Austria Top 40)	2
Belgium (Ultratop 50 Flanders)	2
Netherlands (Dutch Top 40)	14
West Germany (GfK)	4

== Legacy ==
- The song was covered by English singer Vince Hill. Baker Cavendish wrote the English lyrics, with musical arrangement by Johnny Arthey. Released on EMI Columbia, Hill reached number 36 on the UK Singles Chart with it in June 1966.
- English singer Matt Monro (who had competed against Jürgens in the 1964 Eurovision Song Contest and who had a major hit with the English version of "Warum nur, warum?") included his recording of the English version on his 1966 album This Is the Life, releasing the track as a single that failed to chart.
- Portuguese singer Isabel Fontes included his recording of the portuguese version on his 1966 EP Eurovision 1966, including versions also of "Merci Cherie", "Dio, como ti amo" and "Yo soy aquel".
- Gunnar Wiklund with Nisse Hansén's orchestra recorded it for the Swedish market in 1966. Al Sundström wrote the Swedish lyrics but kept the French title. The song was released on the EP Sjunger Eurovisionsschlager 1966 on His Master's Voice.
- In 1967, Bent Fabric released an instrumental version of the song on his album Operation Lovebirds.
- In 2007, American pop star Belinda Carlisle recorded a French version of the song and included it on her album of standards, Voila.

Preceded by "Poupée de cire, poupée de son" by France Gall	Eurovision Song Contest winners 1966	Succeeded by "Puppet on a String" by Sandie Shaw
