= Xandee =

Flemish singer

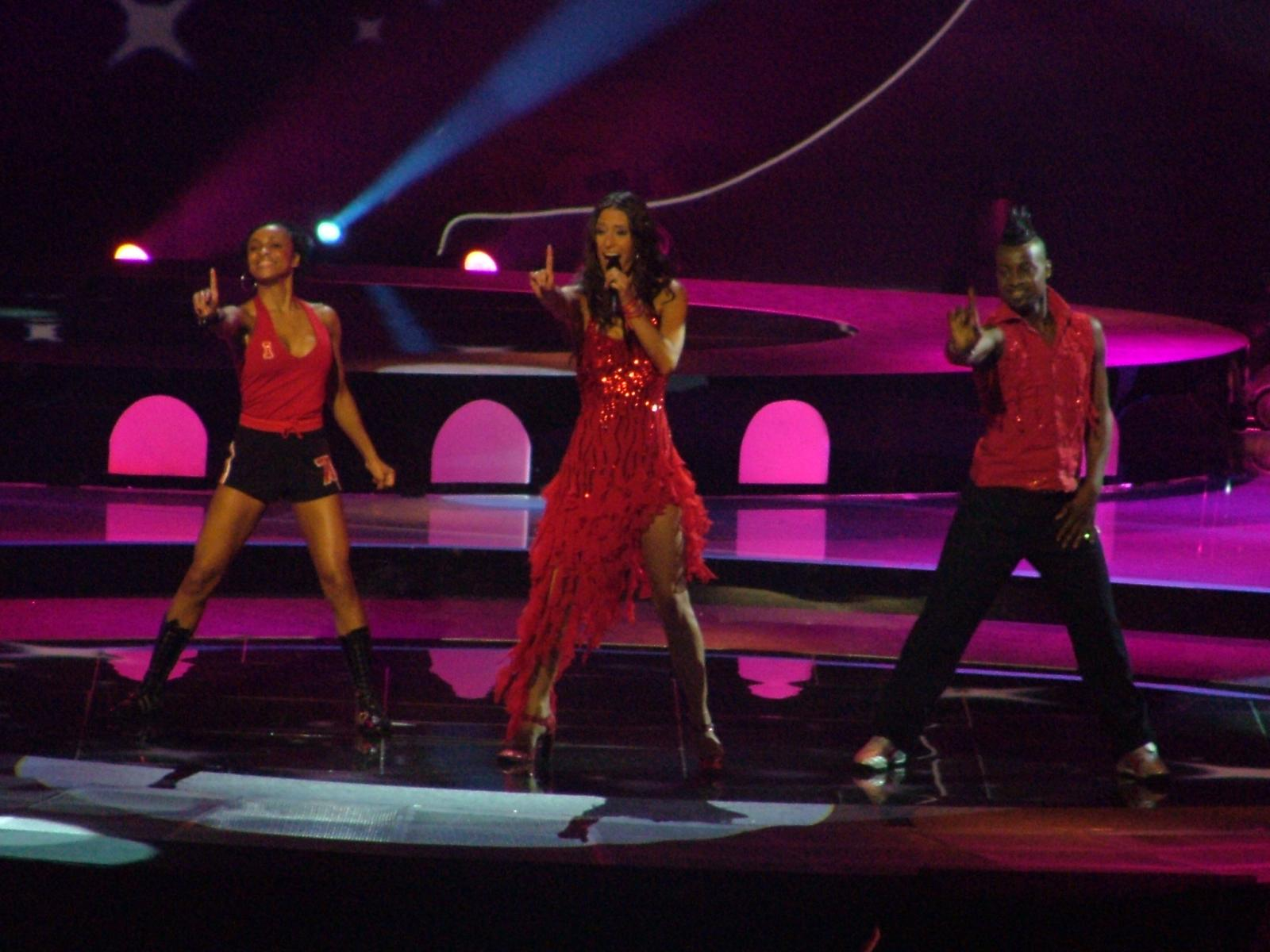
- Xandee (center) during the Eurovision Song Contest 2004

Background information
- Born: Sandy Boets; 18 December 1978 (age 47)
- Origin: Belgium
- Genres: Pop, R&B
- Occupation: Singer
- Instrument: Vocals

Xandee is a stage name of Sandy Boets (born 18 December 1978 in Tienen), Flemish singer who represented Belgium at the Eurovision Song Contest 2004.

At the age of 16 she founded the pop duo Touch of Joy with Serge (Sergio) Quisquater. Sergio and his band Sergio & The Ladies represented Belgium in ESC 2002 with the song "Sister". At the Eurovision Song Contest 2004 in Istanbul Xandee sang the dance uptempo song "1 Life" in the contest. The song was one of the major favourites before the contest, but only got 7 points, 5 of which from neighbouring country the Netherlands, on the final evening. It eventually got only 22nd place out of 24 participants.

Xandee's fate was repeated two years later, at the Eurovision Song Contest 2006 in Athens, where fellow Belgian entry Kate Ryan, despite being a hugely hyped favourite, failed to qualify from the semi-final.

Preceded by Urban Trad with "Sanomi"	Belgium in the Eurovision Song Contest; 2004	Succeeded by Nuno Resende with "Le Grand Soir"
