= Sergio Quisquater =

Belgian musician

Sergio
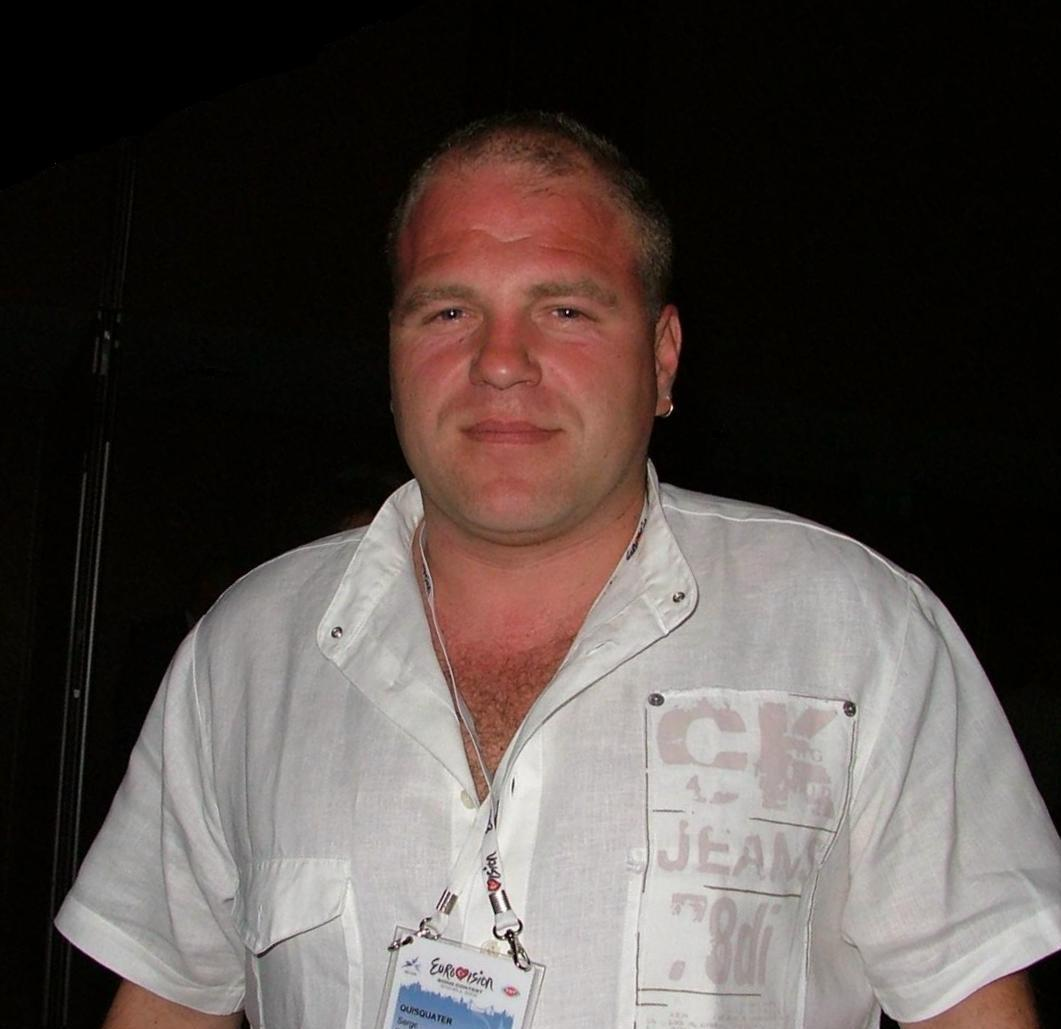
- Quisquater in 2004

Background information
- Born: Serge Jean Karel Quisquater; 5 July 1965 (age 61); Leuven, Belgium
- Occupations: Singer; television presenter
- Years active: 1987–present

Serge Jean Karel Quisquater (born 5 July 1965), known professionally as Sergio Quisquater or simply Sergio, is a Belgian singer and television presenter. Together with Sandy Boets, he formed the duo Touch of Joy. As the frontman of the band Sergio & the Ladies, he represented Belgium in the Eurovision Song Contest 2002 with the song "Sister".

== Career ==
Quisquater released his first record in 1987. He became well-known as the male half of the duo "Taste of Joy", together with singer Sandy Boets. They released several singles and albums. Later they changed their name to Touch of Joy and had some international successes.

Since 1999, Quisquater has hosted several television shows, and the Touch Of Joy project brought him new success with the song "I Can't Let You Go".

In 2002, he represented Belgium in the Eurovision Song Contest together with the Dutch singers Ibernice MacBean, Jody Pijper and Ingrid Simons. They called themselves "Sergio & the Ladies" and performed the song "Sister".

Preceded by Nathalie Sorce with "Envie de vivre"	Belgium in the Eurovision Song Contest; 2002	Succeeded by Urban Trad with "Sanomi"
