= List of languages in the Junior Eurovision Song Contest =

The following is a list of languages used in the Junior Eurovision Song Contest since the contest's inception in 2003, which includes the year, country, song and artist through which each language made its debut. There is a rule in place that stipulates that any given song must be sung in one of the national languages of the country it represents. However, it is permissible for a song to contain lyrics in other languages on top of this.

The songs that contained the most languages were the Serbian entry in 2006 and the Albanian entry in 2015, both with eight. The Serbian song, "Učimo strane jezike", actually only contains two lines (found in its chorus) in Serbian, while the rest is sung in the English, French, German, Italian, Spanish, Russian and Japanese languages. Albania's "Dambaje" is sung in Albanian, German, French, Spanish, English, Italian, Slovene, and Turkish, the last of which made its debut in Junior Eurovision.

Germany's debut entry in 2020, "Stronger With You" was the first Junior Eurovision entry mostly in German, making Germany one of the current participants in Junior Eurovision whose language appeared in the contest before they did.

Brazilian Portuguese, Japanese, Kazakh, and Welsh have been featured in songs of the Junior contest, but they have never been used in songs of the senior Eurovision Song Contest (although a Japanese mantra was sung during the Azerbaijani entry of the cancelled Eurovision Song Contest in 2020).

== Languages ==
Order	Language	First appearance	Country	First performer	First song
1	Greek	2003	Greece	Nicolas Ganopoulos	"Fili gia panta" (Φίλοι για πάντα)
2	Croatian	2003	Croatia	Dino Jelusić	"Ti si moja prva ljubav"
3	Belarusian	2003	Belarus	Volha Satsiuk	"Tantsuy" (Танцуй)
4	Latvian	2003	Latvia	Dzintars Čīča	"Tu esi vasarā"
5	Macedonian	2003	Macedonia	Marija and Viktorija	"Ti ne me poznavaš" (Ти не ме познаваш)
6	Polish	2003	Poland	Kasia Żurawik	"Coś mnie nosi"
7	Norwegian	2003	Norway	2U	"Sinnsykt gal forelsket"
8	Spanish	2003	Spain	Sergio	"Desde el cielo"
9	Romanian	2003	Romania	Bubu	"Tobele sunt viaţa mea"
10	Dutch	2003	Belgium	X!NK	"De vriendschapsband"
11	English	2003	United Kingdom	Tom Morley	"My Song for the World"
12	Danish	2003	Denmark	Anne Gadegaard	"Arabiens drøm"
13	Swedish	2003	Sweden	The Honeypies	"Stoppa mig"
14	Italian	2004	Switzerland	Demis Mirarchi	"Birichino"
15	French	2004	France	Thomas Pontier	"Si on voulait bien"
16	Russian	2005	Russia	Vladislav Krutskikh	"Doroga k solnstu" (Дорога к солнцу)
17	Montenegrin	2005	Serbia and Montenegro	Filip Vučić	"Ljubav pa fudbal" (Љубав па фудбал)
18	Portuguese	2006	Portugal	Pedro Madeira	"Deixa-me sentir"
19	Ukrainian	2006	Ukraine	Nazar Slyusarchuk	"Khlopchyk Rock 'n' Roll" (Хлопчик рок н рол)
20	Serbian	2006	Serbia	Neustrašivi učitelji stranih jezika	"Učimo strane jezike" (Учимо стране језике)
21	German	2006	Serbia	Neustrašivi učitelji stranih jezika	"Učimo strane jezike" (Учимо стране језике)
22	Georgian	2007	Georgia	Mari Romelashvili	"Odelia Ranuni"
23	Armenian	2007	Armenia	Arevik	"Erazanq" (Երազանք)
24	Bulgarian	2007	Bulgaria	Bon Bon	"Bonbolandiya" (Бонболандия)
25	Lithuanian	2007	Lithuania	Lina Joy	"Kai miestas snaudžia"
26	Maltese	2010	Malta	Nicole Azzopardi	"Knock Knock!....Boom! Boom!"
27	Azerbaijani	2012	Azerbaijan	Omar Sultanov & Suada Alekberova	"Girls and Boys (Dünya Sənindir)"
28	Hebrew	2012	Israel	Kids.il	"Let the Music Win"
29	Albanian	2012	Albania	Igzidora Gjeta	"Kam një këngë vetëm për ju"
30	Slovene	2014	Slovenia	Ula Ložar	"Nisi sam (Your Light)"
31	Irish	2015	Ireland	Aimee Banks	"Réalta na mara"
32	Latin	2015	Ireland	Aimee Banks	"Réalta na mara"
33	Turkish	2015	Albania	Mishela Rapo	"Dambaje"
34	Kazakh	2018	Kazakhstan	Daneliya Tuleshova	"Ózińe sen" (Өзіңе сен)
35	Welsh	2018	Wales	Manw	"Perta"
36	Japanese	2021	Netherlands	Ayana	"Mata Sugu Aō Ne" (またすぐ会おうね)
37	Brazilian Portuguese	2022	Portugal	Nicolas Alves	"Anos 70"
38	Estonian	2023	Estonia	Arhanna	"Hoiame kokku"

== Winners by language ==
1. Russian (19.1%)
2. French (14.3%)
3. Armenian (9.50%)
4. Polish (9.50%)
5. Georgian (9.50%)
6. English (9.50%)
7. Croatian (4.80%)
8. Spanish (4.80%)
9. Dutch (4.80%)
10. Ukrainian (4.80%)
11. Italian (4.80%)
12. None (4.80%)

Wins	Language	Years	Countries
4	Russian	2005, 2006, 2007, 2017	Belarus, Russia
3	Armenian	2010, 2021, 2026	Armenia
3	French	2020, 2022, 2023, 2025	France
3	Georgian	2011, 2016, 2024	Georgia
2	Polish	2018, 2019	Poland
2	English	2013, 2015	Malta
1	Croatian	2003	Croatia
1	Spanish	2004	Spain
1	Dutch	2009	Netherlands
1	Ukrainian	2012	Ukraine
1	Italian	2014	Italy

== See also ==
- List of languages in the Eurovision Song Contest
