= Urban Trad =

Belgian folk music group

Soetkin Collier (left), Yves Barbieux, Veronica Codesal

Urban Trad is a Belgian folk music group, consisting of both Flemish and French speaking people and a close connection with Galicia.

== Members ==
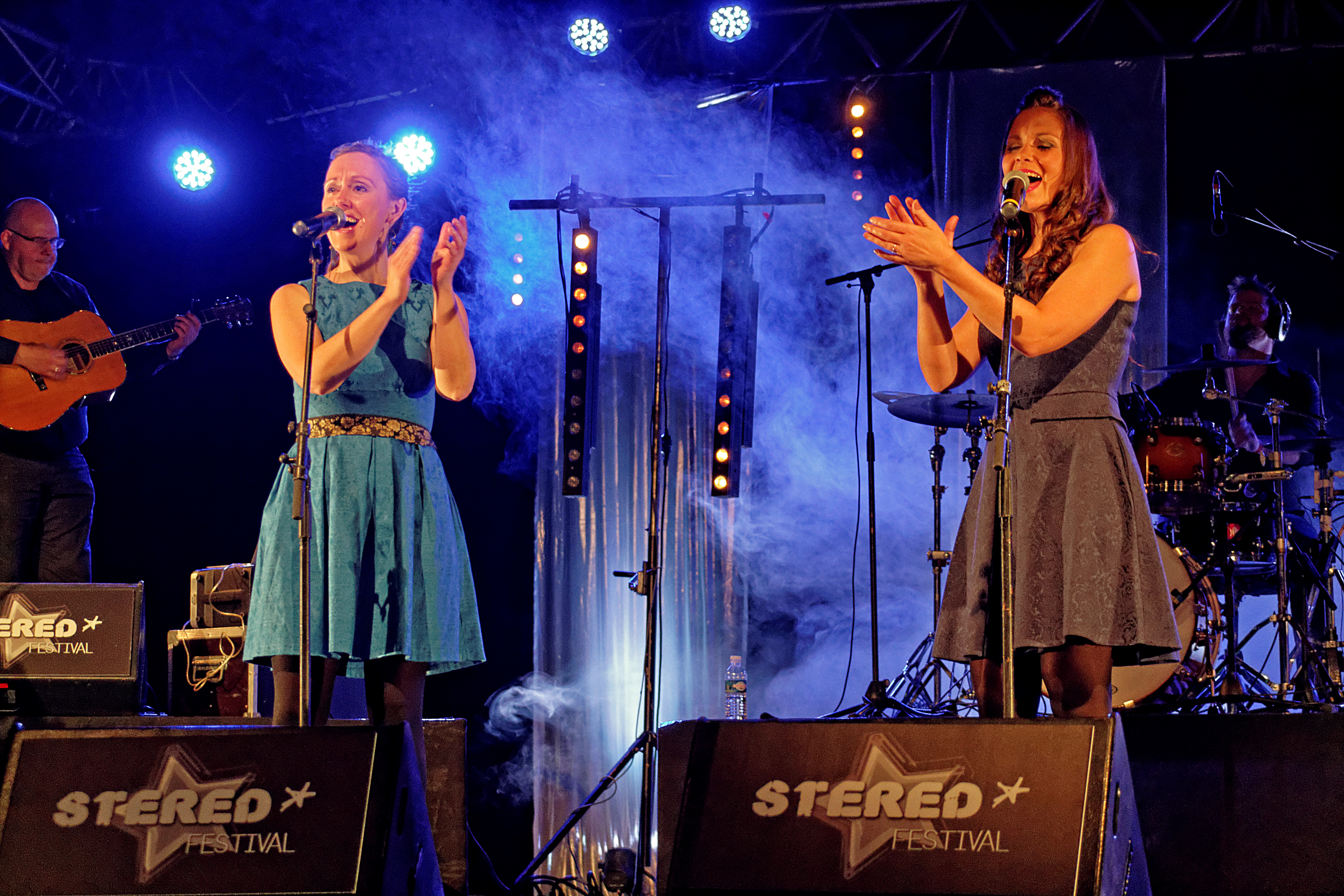
Soetkin Collier and Veronica Codesal in 2015.

- Yves Barbieux: flutes and Galician bagpipe
- Veronica Codesal: vocals
- Soetkin Collier: vocals
- Sophie Cavez (replaced Didier Laloy): diatonic accordion
- Philip Masure: acoustic guitar
- Michel Morvan: drums (died 3 July 2010)
- Dirk Naessens: violin
- Marie-Sophie Talbot: vocals, piano and percussions (no longer with the band)
- Bo Waterschoot: bass
- Jill Delien: bass (since 2014)
- Nicolas Scalliet: drums (since 2014)

== Eurovision Song Contest ==
Urban Trad participated in the Eurovision Song Contest 2003, where they ended second with the song "Sanomi", a modern folk song with vocals in an imaginary language. A few months before the contest, the selectors dropped singer Soetkin Collier on the advice of the Belgian security services, who claimed that she'd had extreme right sympathies in the past. Collier vigorously denied the claims, and later that year after an investigation it was concluded that the accusations were exaggerated and based on outdated information.

As a result of this, two versions of the song exist on record. One was the standard album version (4:08) and another version was released on single and on the Eurovision Song Contest 2003 collaboration album. Often known as the Eurovision edit, it cut down to 3:01 and it had Soetkin Collier's vocals removed.

== Discography ==
- One o Four (2001)
  - 1. Subway Call
  - 2. Avreel
  - 3. La Belle Jig
  - 4. Vodka Time
  - 5. Waltzing Dranouter
  - 6. Basement Scotch
  - 7. Baline
  - 8. Brass Corto
  - 9. Bamboo
  - 10. Free Wheel
  - 11. Rap A Doo
  - 12. Mecanix (Who'S Who) (after Waltzing Dranouter)
- Kerua (2003)
  - 1. Mecanix Remix
  - 2. Kerua
  - 3. Sanomi
  - 4. Il Est Bien Temps
  - 5. Lampang
  - 6. Berim Dance
  - 7. Quimper - Moscou
  - 8. Get Reel
  - 9. The Roses
  - 10. Medina
  - 11. Leina Street
  - 12. Alto
  - 13. Sanomi (Eurovision Edit)
  - 14. Galicia
- Elem (2004)
  - 1. Rodgrod Med Flode
  - 2. De Luz, Amor Y Nada
  - 3. Vigo
  - 4. Jorden/Terra
  - 5. Bourrée d'Erasme
  - 6. De L'Air
  - 7. Valse
  - 8. Two Hornpipes
  - 9. Zout
  - 10. Mind the Gap
  - 11. V.T. Intro
  - 12. Vodka Time (Mass'Mix)
  - 13. Bonus : Lampang/Mideau Rhemila (live)
- Erbalunga (2007)
  - 1. Sans garde-fou
  - 2. Hedningarden
  - 3. Oh la belle
  - 4. Le serpent
  - 5. Erbalunga
  - 6. Fields of Deeley
  - 7. L'olivier
  - 8. Bourrée Tappen
  - 9. Accovi / Onderweg
  - 10. Polaire
  - 11. Noite Longa
  - 12. Scottiche de la tête
  - 13. Asturiana
  - 14. A Terra
  - 15. Diama Den (bonus)

Preceded by Sergio & The Ladies with "Sister"	Belgium in the Eurovision Song Contest; 2003	Succeeded by Xandee with "1 Life"
