= Thomas Hörbiger =

German film actor

- Born: 11 July 1931; Berlin, Germany
- Died: 24 May 2011 (aged 79); Munich, Germany
- Occupations: Actor, Lyricist
- Years active: 1955–1972 (film)

Thomas Hörbiger (11 July 1931 – 24 May 2011) was a German film actor and lyricist. He was the son of the actor Paul Hörbiger. His daughter is the actress Mavie Hörbiger. Hörbiger co-wrote Austria's winning entry at the Eurovision Song Contest 1966, which was sung by Udo Jürgens.

== Selected filmography ==
- The Doctor's Secret (1955)
- Emperor's Ball (1956)
- The Winemaker of Langenlois (1957)
- Love, Girls and Soldiers (1958)
- The Street (1958)

== Bibliography ==
- Barclay, Simon. The Complete & Independent Guide to the Eurovision Song Contest 2014.
