= Belgium in the Eurovision Song Contest 2002 =

- Eurovision Song Contest 2002
- Participating broadcaster: Vlaamse Radio- en Televisieomroeporganisatie (VRT)
- Country: Belgium
- Selection process: Eurosong 2002
- Selection date: 17 February 2002

Competing entry
- Song: "Sister"
- Artist: Sergio & the Ladies
- Songwriters: Dirk Paelinck; Marc Paelinck

Placement
- Final result: 13th, 33 points

Participation chronology

Belgium was represented at the Eurovision Song Contest 2002 with the song "Sister", written by Dirk Paelinck and Marc Paelinck, and performed by the group Sergio & the Ladies. The Belgian participating broadcaster, Flemish Vlaamse Radio- en Televisieomroeporganisatie (VRT), selected its entry for the contest through the national final Eurosong 2002. Belgium returned to the contest after a one-year absence following their relegation from 2001 as one of the bottom six entrants in 2000. The national final featured twenty-eight competing entries and consisted of five shows. In the final on 17 February 2002, "Sister" performed by Sergio @ the Ladies was selected as the winner via the votes of five voting groups. The group was renamed as Sergio & the Ladies for Eurovision.

Belgium competed in the Eurovision Song Contest which took place on 25 May 2002. Performing during the show in position 16, Belgium placed thirteenth out of the 24 participating countries, scoring 33 points.

== Background ==
Prior to the 2002 contest, Belgium had participated in the Eurovision Song Contest forty-three times since its debut as one of seven countries to take part in 1956. Since then, they have won the contest on one occasion in 1986 with the song "J'aime la vie", performed by Sandra Kim. In 2000, "Envie de vivre" performed by Nathalie Sorce placed twenty-fourth (last).

The Belgian participation in the contest alternates between two broadcasters: Flemish Vlaamse Radio- en Televisieomroeporganisatie (VRT) and Walloon Radio-télévision belge de la Communauté française (RTBF) at the time, with both broadcasters sharing the broadcasting rights. Both broadcasters –and their predecessors– had selected the Belgian entry using national finals and internal selections in the past. VRT had the turn to participate in 2002. In 1999 and 2000, both VRT and RTBF organised a national final in order to select its entries. On 6 June 2001, VRT confirmed its participation in the 2002 contest and announced that the Eurosong national final would be held to select its entry.

== Before Eurovision ==
=== Eurosong 2002 ===
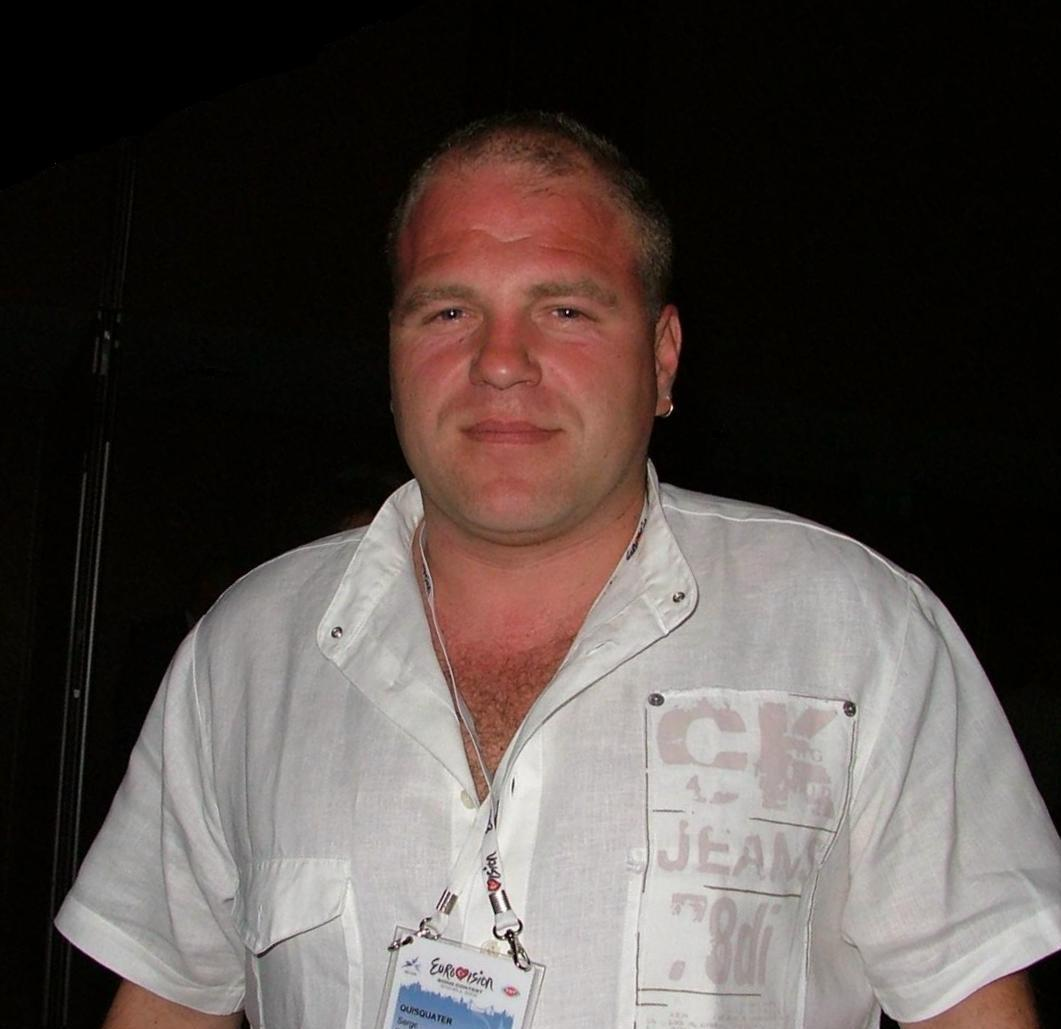
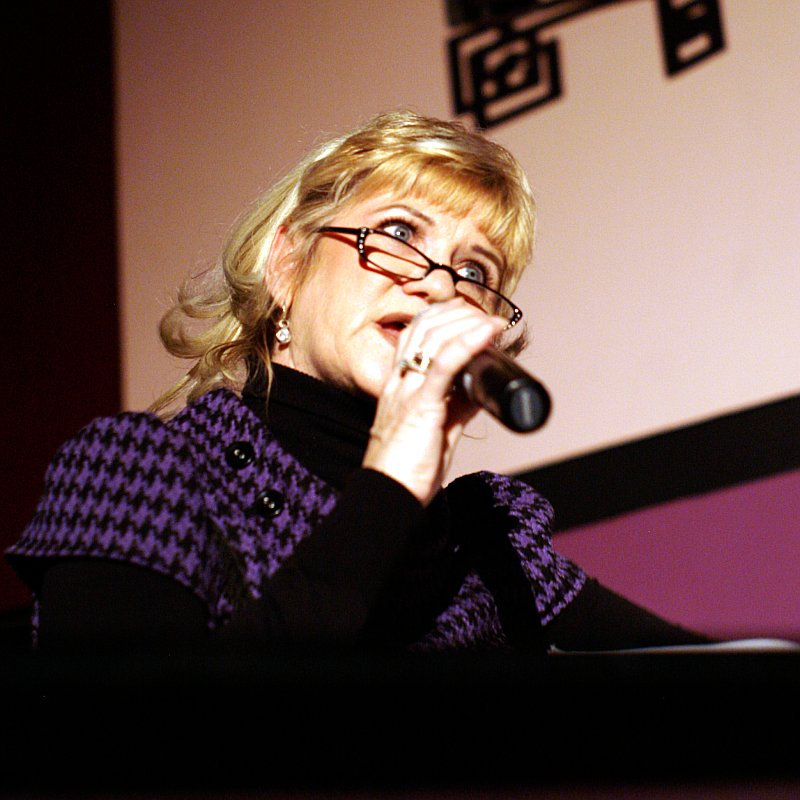
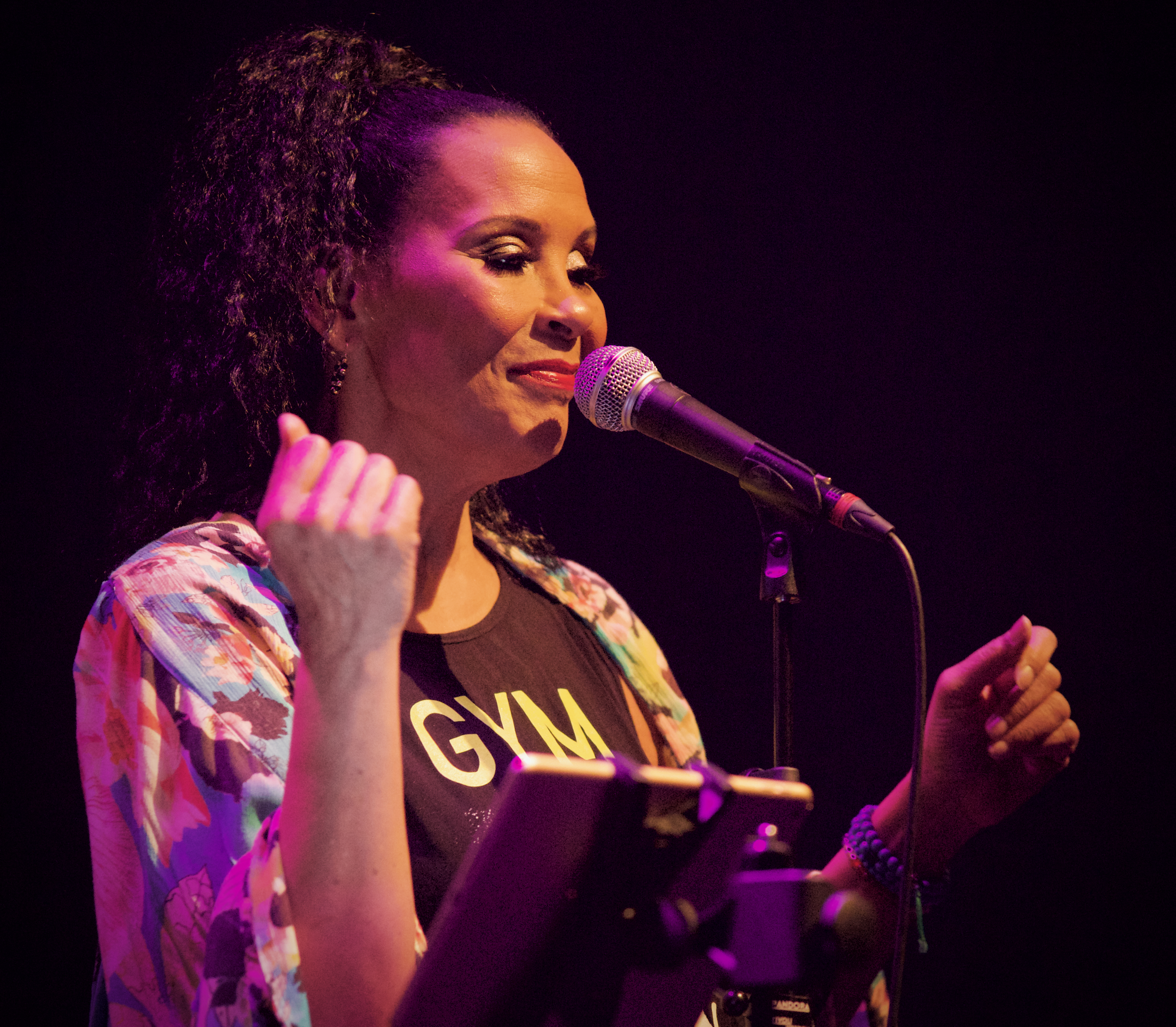
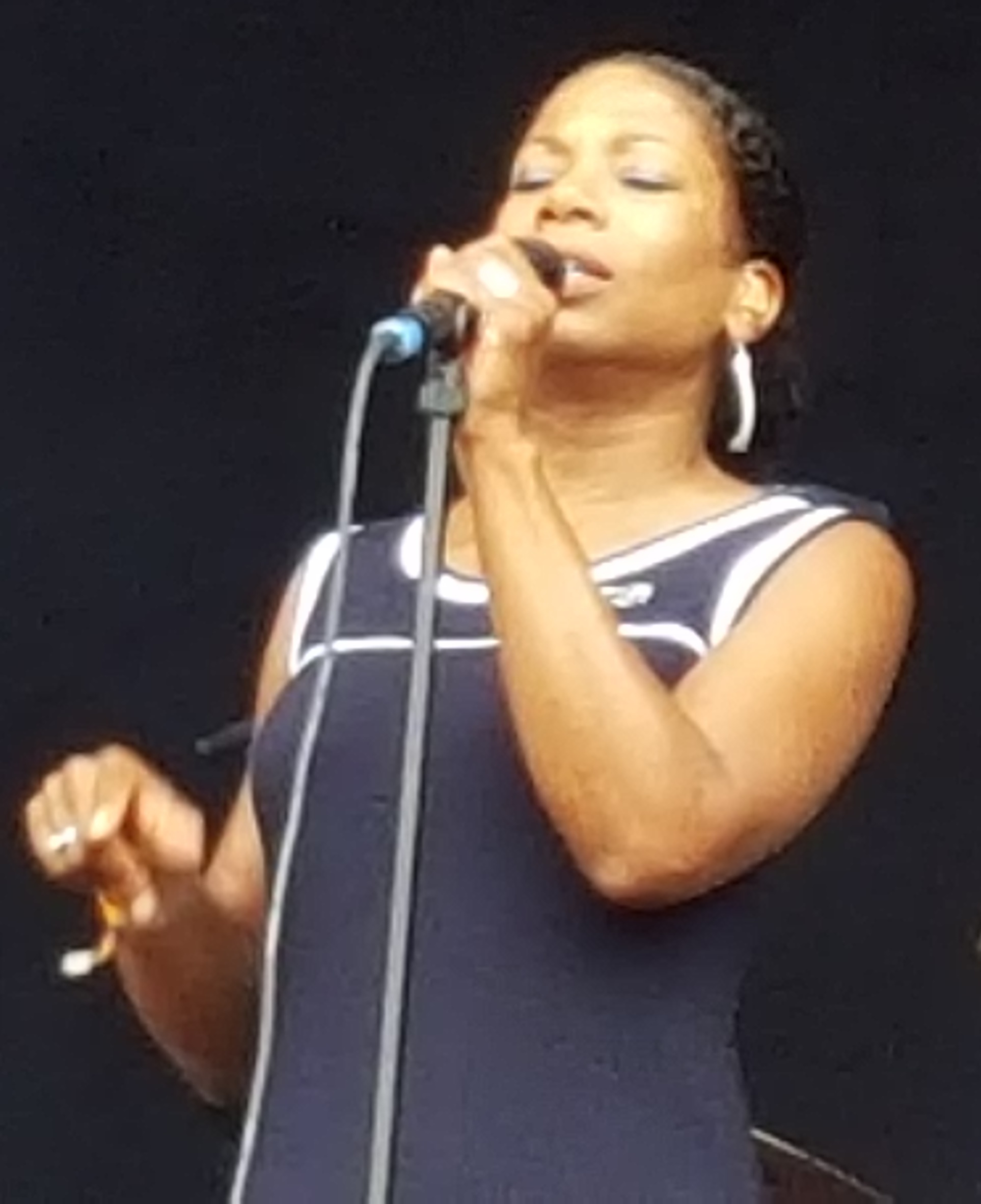
Top to bottom, left to right: Sergio Quisquater, Jody Pijper, Ingrid Simons, and Ibernice MacBean

Eurosong 2002 was the national final organised by VRT to select its entry in the Eurovision Song Contest 2002. The competition consisted of five shows that commenced on 20 January 2002 and concluded with a final on 17 February 2002 where the winning song and artist were selected. All shows took place at the Studio 100 in Schelle, hosted by Bart Peeters and broadcast on TV1.

==== Format ====
Twenty-eight entries were selected to compete in Eurosong. Four semi-finals took place on 20 January 2002, 27 January 2002, 3 February 2002 and 10 February 2002 with each show featuring seven entries. The winner of each semi-final qualified to the final, and the three highest scoring second placed acts in the semi-finals were also selected to advance. The final took place on 17 February 2002 where the winner was chosen. The results of all shows were determined by an expert jury, an international jury consisting of 40 members from the participating countries at the Eurovision Song Contest, voting on Radio 2 and Radio Donna and public televoting. Each voting group had an equal stake in the result during all shows with the exception of the public televote which had a weighting equal to the votes of two groups. For the radio voting, listeners of the two stations was able to vote in advance prior to each of the five shows via televoting between Tuesday and Friday and their votes were combined with a jury consisting of representatives of the respective stations. Each show was broadcast in two parts: in the first part, the songs were performed and the results of the expert jury were announced; after the first part an episode of Stille Waters was aired while the rest of the results were being collected; and in the second part, the results of the international jury and three public voting groups were announced.

During each of the five shows, the expert jury provided commentary and feedback to the artists as well as selected entries to advance in the competition. The experts were:

- Andrea Croonenberghs – actress and singer
- Annemie Ramaekers – journalist at Het Laatste Nieuws
- Bart Alleman – Head of Entertainment at Dag Allemaal
- Ilse Ceulemans – journalist at Story
- Marcel Vanthilt – singer and television presenter
- Rocco Granata – singer-songwriter
- Koen Lauwereyns – editor at Het Volk and Het Nieuwsblad

==== Competing entries ====
A submission period was opened on 6 June 2001 for artists and songwriters to submit their entries until 31 October 2001. The twenty-eight acts selected for the competition from 351 entries received during the submission period were announced on 3 December 2001.

Artist	Song	Songwriter(s)
3 for You	"You and Me"	Evi van de Moortel, Tine van den Bulck, Bieke Mattheussen
Bennett and Bosman	"Everything"	Gary Burr, Chely Wright
Christoff	"Op naar de top"	Daniël Ditmar, John Terra
Danaë	"What Goes Up"	Dirk Cassiers, Jos Cassiers
Fantasie	"Nananana"	Geert van de Meutter, Lies Wuyts, Wim van Meensel
Incredible Time Machine	"The Magic Times"	Rudolf Hecke
Indiana	"Imitation Love"	Scott English, Jim Dyke
Iris	"Forever Yours"	Kit Hain, Cheryl Beatty
Ivan	"Time of My Life"	Raf van Bedts, Paul Vermeulen, Lou Roman
Jimmy	"Shine On"	Eli Mizrahi
Kim 'Kay	"The Sun Shines"	Kim 'Kay, John Terra
Léa Dan	"Comme une enfant"	Vanessa van Strijthem, Jan Leyers
Luc Schuit	"Meer"	Luc Schuit, Pallieter van Buggenhout
Mistery	"Hollywood Star"	Ricky Mondes, Jimmy Towers, Dirk Winters
Patrick Vinx	"Ik kan jou niet vergeten"	Dirk Paelinck, Marc Paelinck
Peter Elkins	"If I..."	Dirk Paelinck, Marc Paelinck
Raf Van Brussel	"Flyin'"	Raf van Brussel
Raffaele	"I ragazzi di oggi"	Fred Bekky, Raffaele Vetrugno
Sergio @ the Ladies	"Sister"	Dirk Paelinck, Marc Paelinck
Severine Doré	"Wherever You'll Be"	Dirk Paelinck, Marc Paelinck
Sonny	"All Out of Love"	Dirk Paelinck, Marc Paelinck
Spark	"Someday"	Jess Leary, Mary Ann Kennedy, Kye Fleming
Tanya Dexters	"When I Look in Your Eyes"	Gunther Thomas, Wim Claes
VandaVanda	"All My Love"	Peter Gillis, Miguel Wiels, Alain van de Putte
Wade and C	"Paco y Pacita"	Patsy Verfaille, Vincent Goeminne, Kristof Lesure, Pallieter van Buggenhout
Wuyts and Schepens	"Without Love"	Danny Wuyts, Jan Schepens
Wim Leys	"Nooit een dag te laat"	Ruud Houweling
Yasmina	"Take This Heart"	Rudolf Hecke, Mark van Hie

==== Semi-finals ====
The four semi-finals took place on 20 January, 27 January, 3 February and 10 February 2002. In each show seven entries competed and the combination of results from two jury groups, two radio voting groups and a public televote determined the winner that qualified to the final. The three highest scoring second placed acts in the semi-finals also proceeded to the final.

Semi-final 1 – 20 January 2002
R/O	Artist	Song	Jury	Radio	Public	Total	Place
1	Wuyts and Schepens	"Without Love"	16	18	18	52	1
2	3 for You	"You and Me"	4	7	6	17	5
3	Wim Leys	"Nooit een dag te laat"	5	7	2	14	6
4	Sonny	"All Out of Love"	14	12	14	40	2
5	Mistery	"Hollywood Star"	3	4	4	11	7
6	Kim 'Kay	"The Sun Shines"	12	12	10	34	3
7	Léa Dan	"Comme une enfant"	8	2	8	18	4

Detailed Jury Votes
R/O	Song	Expert	International	Total
1	"Without Love"	9	7	16
2	"You and Me"	3	1	4
3	"Nooit een dag te laat"	2	3	5
4	"All Out of Love"	5	9	14
5	"Hollywood Star"	1	2	3
6	"The Sun Shines"	7	5	12
7	"Comme une enfant"	4	4	8

Detailed Radio Votes
R/O	Song	Radio 2	Donna	Total
1	"Without Love"	9	9	18
2	"You and Me"	3	4	7
3	"Nooit een dag te laat"	4	3	7
4	"All Out of Love"	5	7	12
5	"Hollywood Star"	2	2	4
6	"The Sun Shines"	7	5	12
7	"Comme une enfant"	1	1	2

Semi-final 2 – 27 January 2002
R/O	Artist	Song	Jury	Radio	Public	Total	Place
1	Incredible Time Machine	"The Magic Times"	8	6	8	22	4
2	Bennett and Bosman	"Everything"	4	16	6	26	3
3	Ivan	"Time of My Life"	7	4	10	21	5
4	Tanya Dexters	"When I Look in Your Eyes"	6	2	2	10	7
5	Luc Schuit	"Meer"	5	9	4	18	6
6	Severine Doré	"Wherever You'll Be"	18	16	18	52	1
7	Raf Van Brussel	"Flyin'"	14	9	14	37	2

Detailed Jury Votes
R/O	Song	Expert	International	Total
1	"The Magic Times"	4	4	8
2	"Everything"	1	3	4
3	"Time of My Life"	2	5	7
4	"When I Look in Your Eyes"	5	1	6
5	"Meer"	3	2	5
6	"Wherever You'll Be"	9	9	18
7	"Flyin'"	7	7	14

Detailed Radio Votes
R/O	Song	Radio 2	Donna	Total
1	"The Magic Times"	3	3	6
2	"Everything"	7	9	16
3	"Time of My Life"	2	2	4
4	"When I Look in Your Eyes"	1	1	2
5	"Meer"	5	4	9
6	"Wherever You'll Be"	9	7	16
7	"Flyin'"	4	5	9

Semi-final 3 – 3 February 2002
R/O	Artist	Song	Jury	Radio	Public	Total	Place
1	Raffaele	"I ragazzi di oggi"	8	9	8	25	4
2	Danaë	"What Goes Up"	10	14	10	34	2
3	Jimmy	"Shine On"	2	3	2	7	7
4	Patrick Vinx	"Ik kan jou niet vergeten"	8	8	4	20	5
5	Iris	"Forever Yours"	12	7	14	33	3
6	Wade and C	"Paco y Pacita"	4	3	6	13	6
7	Spark	"Someday"	18	18	18	54	1

Detailed Jury Votes
R/O	Song	Expert	International	Total
1	"I ragazzi di oggi"	4	4	8
2	"What Goes Up"	7	3	10
3	"Shine On"	1	1	2
4	"Ik kan jou niet vergeten"	3	5	8
5	"Forever Yours"	5	7	12
6	"Paco y Pacita"	2	2	4
7	"Someday"	9	9	18

Detailed Radio Votes
R/O	Song	Radio 2	Donna	Total
1	"I ragazzi di oggi"	5	4	9
2	"What Goes Up"	7	7	14
3	"Shine On"	1	2	3
4	"Ik kan jou niet vergeten"	3	5	8
5	"Forever Yours"	4	3	7
6	"Paco y Pacita"	2	1	3
7	"Someday"	9	9	18

Semi-final 4 – 10 February 2002
R/O	Artist	Song	Jury	Radio	Public	Total	Place
1	Indiana	"Imitation Love"	8	7	6	21	4
2	Christoff	"Op naar de top"	4	4	4	12	6
3	Peter Elkins	"If I..."	9	12	10	31	3
4	Yasmina	"Take This Heart"	18	16	14	48	1
5	Sergio @ the Ladies	"Sister"	14	14	18	46	2
6	Fantasie	"Nananana"	2	3	2	7	7
7	VandaVanda	"All My Love"	7	6	8	21	4

Detailed Jury Votes
R/O	Song	Expert	International	Total
1	"Imitation Love"	5	3	8
2	"Op naar de top"	2	2	4
3	"If I..."	4	5	9
4	"Take This Heart"	9	9	18
5	"Sister"	7	7	14
6	"Nananana"	1	1	2
7	"All My Love"	3	4	7

Detailed Radio Votes
R/O	Song	Radio 2	Donna	Total
1	"Imitation Love"	4	3	7
2	"Op naar de top"	3	1	4
3	"If I..."	7	5	12
4	"Take This Heart"	9	7	16
5	"Sister"	5	9	14
6	"Nananana"	1	2	3
7	"All My Love"	2	4	6

==== Final ====
The final took place on 17 February 2002 where the seven entries that qualified from the preceding four semi-finals competed. The winner, "Sister" performed by Sergio @ the Ladies, was selected by the combination of results from two jury groups, two radio voting groups and a public televote. "Sister" received 220,436 of the record 330,140 televotes registered during the show.

Final – 17 February 2002
R/O	Artist	Song	Jury	Radio	Public	Total	Place
1	Raf Van Brussel	"Flyin'"	2	2	2	6	7
2	Severine Doré	"Wherever You'll Be"	7	6	4	17	6
3	Sonny	"All Out Of Love"	10	4	6	20	5
4	Sergio @ the Ladies	"Sister"	18	16	18	52	1
5	Wuyts and Schepens	"Without Love"	6	8	8	22	4
6	Spark	"Someday"	9	16	14	39	2
7	Yasmina	"Take This Heart"	10	10	10	30	3

Detailed Jury Votes
R/O	Song	Expert	International	Total
1	"Flyin'"	1	1	2
2	"Wherever You'll Be"	4	3	7
3	"All Out Of Love"	3	7	10
4	"Sister"	9	9	18
5	"Without Love"	2	4	6
6	"Someday"	7	2	9
7	"Take This Heart"	5	5	10

Detailed Radio Votes
R/O	Song	Radio 2	Donna	Total
1	"Flyin'"	1	1	2
2	"Wherever You'll Be"	3	3	6
3	"All Out Of Love"	2	2	4
4	"Sister"	7	9	16
5	"Without Love"	4	4	8
6	"Someday"	9	7	16
7	"Take This Heart"	5	5	10

==== Ratings ====
Viewing figures by show
Show	Date	Viewing figures		Ref.
Show	Date	Nominal	Share	Ref.
Final	17 February 2002	1,680,000	74%	

== At Eurovision ==
According to Eurovision rules, all nations with the exceptions of the bottom six countries in the 2001 contest competed in the final. On 9 November 2001, a special allocation draw was held which determined the running order and Belgium was set to perform in position 16, following the entry from Bosnia and Herzegovina and before the entry from France. The group performed at the contest under the new name Sergio & the Ladies, and Belgium finished in thirteenth place with 33 points.

The contest was broadcast in Belgium by both the Flemish and Walloon broadcasters. VRT broadcast the show on TV1 with commentary in Dutch by André Vermeulen and Bart Peeters. RTBF televised the shows on La Une with commentary in French by Jean-Pierre Hautier. The show was also broadcast via radio, with VRT covering the event on Radio 2 with commentary in Dutch by Julien Put and Michel Follet and on Radio Donna with commentary in Dutch by Jan Bosman, and RTBF covering the event on La Première with commentary in French by Laurent Daube and Éric Russon.

=== Voting ===
Below is a breakdown of points awarded to Belgium and awarded by Belgium in the contest. The nation awarded its 12 points in the contest to Spain. VRT appointed Geena Lisa Peeters as its spokesperson to announce the Belgian votes during the show.

Points awarded to Belgium
Score	Country
12 points	
10 points	Turkey
8 points	
7 points	Russia
6 points	
5 points	
4 points	Denmark; United Kingdom
3 points	Sweden
2 points	France; Lithuania
1 point	Spain

Points awarded by Belgium
Score	Country
12 points	Spain
10 points	France
8 points	Latvia
7 points	Malta
6 points	United Kingdom
5 points	Austria
4 points	Estonia
3 points	Cyprus
2 points	Israel
1 point	Sweden
