= Lithuanian Sign Language =

Deaf sign language of Lithuania

- LGK
- Native to: Lithuania
- Native speakers: 8,000 (2021)
- Language family: influenced by Russian Sign

Language codes
- ISO 639-3: lls
- Glottolog: lith1236

Lithuanian Sign Language (Lithuanian: Lietuvių gestų kalba, LGK) is the national sign language used in Lithuania, with several regional variants. Very little is known about its history before 1945. From 1945 to 1990 it was used along with Russian Sign Language and the two sign languages became very similar. Russian lip-patterns used with some LGK signs indicate that the sign may have been originally borrowed from Russian Sign Language. When Lithuania became independent, its contacts with Russian Sign Language were almost cut off, and now it is developing as an independent language, with some influence from international signs.

In 1995, LGK was granted legal recognition as the native language of the Deaf people in Lithuania as part of the Law on the State Language of the Republic of Lithuania. Linguistic research of LGK started in 1996. Since then, a Lithuanian Sign Language Dictionary (based on traditional word to sign principle) was published in 5 volumes (including about 3000 signs), along with some thematic vocabularies and bilingual texts in LGK and Lithuanian (including Adam's book). Now work is being done on an LGK database and sign language teaching materials for parents of deaf children, teachers teaching deaf students and sign language interpreters.
