= Broccolino =

Brooklyn-based dialect of Italian

- Native to: United States
- Ethnicity: Italian Americans
- Language family: Indo-European: Italic; Latino-Faliscan; Latin; Romance; Italo-Western; Italo-Dalmatian; Italo-Romance; Italian; Broccolino
- Writing system: Italian alphabet

Language codes
- ISO 639-3: –

Broccolino is a dialect spoken by Italian-Americans in Brooklyn, one of the five boroughs of New York City. Broccolino is also the Italianized name for Brooklyn, likely given during Italian emigration to the United States.

== Italian emigration to the United States ==
Among the post-unification migration destinations, in addition to European countries such as France, Switzerland, and Germany, were also the United States, Argentina, and Brazil. Between 1880 and 1914, more than four and a half million Italians, mostly from southern Italy, landed in the United States. Expatriations from Italy reached nearly six million, before stopping in 1976, when returns began.

After the First World War, the U.S. government imposed restrictions on immigration by issuing the Immigration Act, or Barred Zone Act, which required a literacy test for all immigrants over the age of 16. Later, the Immigration Act, or Johnson Act (1924), limited the number of immigrants entering the United States.

According to Tullio De Mauro, Italian emigration can be studied from three perspectives:

- Demographic: as the cause of population decline;
- Economic: wages and employment contracts improved, and immigrants sent money to those who remained in their homeland;
- Linguistic: Illiteracy and the mass of dialect speakers were reduced, especially in Southern Italy, where schools only developed around the time of the First World War. Exclusive dialect-speaking stood at 97.5% during the years of unification, but gradually decreased: from 86-90% in 1861 to 23-32% in 1951, reaching 20% in the 1980s.

For emigrants, the prevailing register of communication was local dialects, and they were unaware of standard Italian due to the distance between the two countries. Dialects also had a cultural and identity-building underpinning, a reminder of life in Italy, while learning English meant success and social advancement.

Dialect-speaking communities were created on a regional or provincial basis, but Italians' attitudes toward standard Italian were more negative than positive; many parents, for example, were opposed to teaching Italian to their children.

In this sociocultural context, contact between language and dialect contributed to the creation of a linguistic continuum that had no clear boundaries and which, alongside English, ranged from dialectal Italian to Italianized dialect, to Italian-American pidgins, to archaic dialects.

== Characteristics ==
Five phases have been identified that trace the development of the Italian language in North America:

- In the first, Italian and, more often, regional dialects prevail over English, which is relegated to fixed expressions such as "Ok, that's alright," or "Yeah."
- In the second phase, knowledge of English is still weak, but a linguistic code shift occurs, which can be traced back to an early form of Italian-American, characterized by language that often has a regional basis;
- The third phase is characterized by the use of Italian-American in Italian communities. Code shifting continues, with Italian-American as the base language and English as the substitute language;
- In the fourth phase, English is used primarily, while Italian-American takes a back seat;
- Finally, in the fifth phase, there is a total disappearance of Italian-American influences, as speakers are now monolingual in English.

Studies of Italian-Americans in New York City and Long Island reveal the existence of a non-standard lingua franca, homogeneous and spoken by immigrants from Southern Italy who used it for "higher" communication outside the family context, where narrow dialects or various forms of pidgin prevailed.

The presence of a lingua franca shared by those from different regions of Italy could be the result of dialectal leveling, through which the great variety of dialects converged towards a common form. Some lexical examples are the use of 'scudo' (probably dating back to the first immigrants from Italy shortly after unification) with the meaning of 'dollar', or 'piece'/'pezza' used with the same meaning (which refers to the custom of cutting gold coins into equal parts, each worth one dollar).

The Italian-American lingua franca is distinguished by the prevalence of dialectal features over Anglicisms and popular traits. Its use varies depending on factors such as age, generation, gender, level of education, social integration, and migratory route. Basing the analysis on generational factors, older subjects – therefore belonging to the first generation – emigrated mainly from the rural areas of southern Italy and settled in the United States without a valid social and cultural preparation.

They are those who have not acquired perfect English and show a high degree of convergence between dialect and English. Younger first-generation speakers, however, who attended school in Italy, have a better level of competence in standard Italian. They allow some dialectal terms to penetrate their higher register, which lacks convergence with English. However, for this generation the picture remains very varied and the boundaries with the first can sometimes be blurred: they depend, for example, on the years of education in Italy and the United States, the linguistic attitude of parents and relatives, the influence of American peers and schooling in the new country.

With the second generation of young people, English is the dominant variety, but the diglossia constituted by English and the dialectal, popular, and Anglo-American elements acquired from parents and grandparents is evident. A deterioration in the competence of the higher variety occurs, with halting speech, full of repetitions, self-corrections, desperate silences, when the right word is not understood. This is a generation born in America to Italian parents. Generally, they tend towards Anglophone monolingualism, which is also revealed when they try to speak Italian: for example, the use of andar fuori with the meaning of 'to go out' is frequent, because it is translated from the English 'going out'; or the plural of the verb in "people treated me," which is explained by considering the plural of the English noun people.

Surveys on New York communities have revealed that the loss of Italian decreases with advancing age in the first generation, but linguistic shift, and therefore the tendency for Italian to be perceived as a foreign language, increases with advancing age in the second generation.

== Dialectal features ==
=== Phonology ===
The dynamic interaction between English, standard Italian, and regional dialectal characteristics has produced a variable degree of dialectality.

The most frequent dialectal features in Broccolino, typical of southern dialects, are found in the voicing of /p/ and /t/ between vowels (lasciado, trovado), the voicing of /t/ between –n and a vowel (tando), the assimilation of rl to –rr- (parro for 'I speak', parrano for 'they speak') and nd to -nn- (quanno). Other characteristics include apocope (so iuta, so cambiate), syncope (mi rcordo, certament), and doubled consonants such as 'b' (sobbito). These dialectal remnants are prevalent in older, first-generation individuals who became bilingual as adults.

=== Morphosyntax ===
Morphosyntax is the area with the greatest number of dialectal elements, especially among first-generation immigrants. Among immigrants who have attended school in Italy for a few years, some young people speak Italian fluently, while others are somewhat uncertain. Overall, they are able to keep their various languages separate, but having lived in a dialect-speaking environment even in the United States, and despite linguistic inertia, they exhibit many of the morphosyntactic traits listed below. Italian-Americans often replace the definite article with 'a', especially the feminine singular (a giobba, a gente, a luce, a lavatrice).

The unstressed personal pronoun 'ci' is often combined with the verb form, replacing the third-person singular and plural Italian forms (gli, le, loro). Some examples: "if you meet someone, you can't talk to him (them)"; "they give us (them) money". Common in southern dialects is the amplification of the comparative form of adjectives (più, meglio).

The conjunction 'che' is often used with a polysemic function: "I went to high school" (local function), "I left Italy when I was nineteen" (temporal function); or it can replace the relative pronoun: "the temperature I never managed to adapt to." Possessive adjectives are often used in a postnominal position, a tendency typical of southern dialects: a casa tua, il dialetto tuo.

For verbal forms, 'avere' is often used as an intransitive verb (ho venuto, ho ritorno, m'ha piacere), while 'essere' is used as a transitive verb (sono vista). The present tense of auxiliary verbs is the most used, while there is often confusion between the conditional and the subjunctive in hypothetical sentences («se in Italia ci fusse u travagghiu giusto, fosse diverso»). While the second generation, made up of those born in the United States, has the auxiliary 'avere' followed by the infinitive, but it is conceivable that there is a convergence with English (had to + infinitive). Furthermore, there is frequent lack of agreement between gender and number between nouns and adjectives: «la gente sono diversi».

=== Lexicon ===
Two main trends can be distinguished in the lexicon: the occurrence of dialectalisms in Italian-Americans and the use of Anglicisms.

Among the few examples of the former, the use of 'imparare' and 'insegnarsi' is found, especially among immigrants from southern Italy ("mi sono imparato," "si sono imparato"); 'tenere' is often used with the meaning of 'avere' ("tendeva due anni," "tengo assai nostalgia").

For second-generation Italians, individual variations in their speech (pazienz, necessitate, amichi) are noted due to the uncertainty in the use of dialects.

Anglicisms appear in smaller numbers in the upper Italian dialect spoken by Italian-Americans. Among the few loanwords found among older Italians are jobless (unemployed), standard, nice (nice), and retire (to retire). Some used calques are carta verde (the green card, the work permit for emigrants in the United States) and italiani americani (from the English Italian Americans).

== See also ==
- Italian Americans
- Italian language in the United States
