= Michel Follet =

- Born: 16 December 1959 (age 66); Mortsel, Belgium
- Occupations: television presenter, radio presenter, film critic
- Years active: 1982-present

Michel Follet, (Mortsel, December 16, 1959) is a Flemish radio and television presenter.

== Biography ==
Follet studied classical secondary education with Greek and Latin at the Onze-Lieve-Vrouw-van Lourdes College in Edegem. He then continued his studies at the Royal Institute for Theatre, Film and Sound (RITCS) in Brussels.

== Radio career ==
He began his career at various independent radio stations. Follet also worked as a radio presenter and producer at the VRT (Flemish Radio and Television). He joined Radio 2, Omroep Brabant, in 1983. In 1989, Follet won the Gouden Klokke Roeland Prize (Radio Critics’ Award) for his programme ‘Dag en Dauw’. He presented the radio programmes ‘Oordegelijk’ and ‘Kop of Flet’, the late-night show ‘Twee tot Twee’, and later became one of the voices of ‘FunkyTown’.

In 1992, he co-founded Radio Donna. Prior to that, he had presented ‘Jabbedabbedoe’ for eight years. At the weekends, he presented ‘Hitkwis’ and ‘Buffet Follet’. He continued to work there until 1999, when he moved to Radio 2. He then decided to leave the VRT in 2000 and became one of the founders of Radio Mango, run by the VMMa (Flemish Media Company). Follet subsequently presented the morning programme on JOE FM, now known as JOE.

From 2001 to 2006, he presented the programme ‘Smaakmakers’ in the Netherlands on Radio 2 for the Dutch Christian Radio Association (NCRV). In early 2008, he received an award in recognition of his 25-year career in radio.

In August 2008, the VRT’s senior management decided to bring Radio Donna to an end. The station had lost many of its listeners over the years. Follet had spoken the very first words on Radio Donna back then, and on 2 January 2009, he had the last word: ‘Donnadieu’.

Since 6 July 2009, Follet has been working as a presenter at JOE FM, formerly known as 4fm. On Saturdays and Sundays, he presented ‘Michel XXL’ until 10.00 am. As part of the programme, he speaks on the phone every week with Hijlco Span, who was his producer at the Dutch radio station. From 2012 to 2015, he presented ‘The Single Connection’ on Saturdays from 10 am to 12 noon and ‘The Album Connection’ on Sundays from 10 am to 12 noon. The programme ‘Outlet Follet’ was broadcast at weekends in 2015 and 2016 from 3 pm to 6 pm. Follet now works behind the scenes at JOE. In the summer of 2016, he once again had a segment on the Dutch NPO Radio 2 programme presented by Jeroen Kijk in de Vegte, called ‘Bureau Kijk in de Vegte’, in which he discussed Belgian pop records in his own unique way.

To mark one hundred years of radio, the VRT conducted a large-scale survey in 2014. Lutgard Simoens was voted the best radio personality of the past decades. Follet finished in third place, behind Sven Ornelis, whom he launched on the radio in the early 1990s.

In addition to his behind-the-scenes work for JOE, Follet has been heard twice a day since the end of February 2024 in a segment with Joe Gold, and on weekends from 10 to 12, everything is bundled under the name Buffet Follet.

From 2025, Follet will be a presenter on Radio Nostalgie Plus.

== Television career ==
Follet is a film enthusiast. The first programme he presented on television was a film quiz. From 1981 to 1986, he presented ‘Cinemanie’ on BRT( Belgium Radio and Televion), ‘Rigoletto’v(1986–1989), the children’s quiz ‘Schoolslag’ (1989–1993), the Sunday afternoon magazine programme ‘De Zondagsvriend’ and ‘Hitkwis’. He also presented events such as the Diamond Awards on VRT and the annual Plateau Awards on TV2.

Follet was a recurring guest on programs on Dutch television, such as on KRO (Hints) and TROS. He served on the jury of Kinderen voor Kinderen for VARA for two years.

He served as a jury member multiple times for the selection for the Eurovision Song Contest in Flanders and provided live commentary at the festival itself in 1996. He regularly sat on the jury of the Song Contest and presented the pre-selections.

In addition, Follet has worked for the regional channel ATV (Antwerp Television) since 1995, where he presented the weekly film segment Cinema and provided the voice-over for some programs. Cinema was discontinued at the end of December 2015 after 21 years. Follet can still occasionally be seen in the ATV news when a new Belgian film is released.

For two years, Follet presented a film magazine on TV Limburg (TVL) and on TV East Flanders (TV Oost).

Since December 2017, he has been presenting two talk shows on the TV channel Eclips TV: “Aan het juiste adres”, in which he welcomes four guests every working day, and the music programme “De herkenwijsjes”, alongside pianist Geert Maeckelbergh. Other shorter programmes he produces (or has produced) for Eclips TV include “De Coronaquiz” (autumn/winter 2020), “De Kleine Lenteschoonmaak” (spring 2020 and spring 2021) and “Huisgenoten” (season 1, summer 2020 and season 2, summer 2021), in which he spotlights a singer, actor, writer, artist or sports personality every day with whom he has a connection and who, in one way or another, is a regular visitor to his home.

In april 2019 het started presenting ‘De Punten Van De Jury’, with a look back at past Eurovision Song Contests.

Since 2021, he has been presenting ‘Clips A La Carte’ every weekday, a programme featuring around four to five clips each time – some musical, some not; these may also include film, musicals and even ballet. He identifies the composer, director or actor using photographs. Musically, the programme covers a very broad spectrum: from chanson to classical, from jazz to folk music. Often, classics are performed by young artists. At the weekend, since December 2023, Follet has been presenting the quiz ‘De Zelftest’, in which the viewer at home is the contestant.

== The funfair ==
As well as film, funfairs are his great passion. In 1987, for example, he published the book ‘Foorwaarts’ about the world of funfairs, and in 1999 ‘Roulez Roulez – A Funfair Script’. A double CD was based on this: ‘Roulez Roulez – A Musical Funfair Script’. In addition to these books, there is a DVD entitled ‘Foorwaarts’, and in 2007 he made the documentary ‘Kermismakers’ for RTV. In 2009, he published a book marking forty years of the Sinksenfoor at the Zuiderdokken, which appeared at Whitsun 2009 under the title ‘Een Tapijt Vol Beweging’. In 2011, he produced a fairground calendar featuring 366 photographs. In March 2016, a new fairground book, ‘Kaartjes aan de kassa’, was published. It contains 25 long columns on little-known aspects of fairground life.

In July 2016, he received the Piet Maes Fairground Prize of the Netherlands, presented by the Fairground Culture Foundation at the main Tilburg fair. Follet is the first Belgian to receive this prize.

In the autumn of 2022, ‘Een slag van de molen’ was published, in which he sketches the history of major sensation funairmills from the 1950s to the present in his own way.

== Books, CDs and other publications ==
He wrote a book about living with stalking: ‘Eye Contact’. In March 2010, he published a book about the suppression of Flemish music, entitled ’Roses or Thistles for Sandra’, a reference to a hit by Jimmy Frey. The book is an indictment of the current radio landscape.

Follet worked for the CD and DVD company Magic/EMI, where he was responsible for all concept albums and compilation CDs, such as ‘Kampvuurklassiekers 1, 2 & 3’ and ‘Super Feestmakers’ (now comprising six volumes). He was also responsible for Flemish artists such as Nicol & Hugo and Davy Gilles. In 2009, he released the CD ‘Lanterna Magica’ with a number of blind musicians. He also released his own CD series, ‘Favoriet Van Follet’. The seventh volume of this series was released in 2011.

== Bibliography ==
• Cinemanieboek (1984, BRT Uitgave)

• Kijkhalzend (1985, Dedalus)

• Tout Court (1986, Dedalus)

• Foorwaarts (1987, Dedalus)

• Roulez Roulez. Een draaiboek van de kermis. (1999, Standaard Uitgeverij)

• Oogcontact (2001, House Of Books)

• Oorlog in het hoofd.(2008, Uitgeverij Vrijdag)

• De Sinksenfoor. Een tapijt vol beweging. (2009, Uitgeverij Vrijdag)

• Rozen of distels voor Sandra. (2010, Uitgeverij Vrijdag)

• Roulez Roulez. Alle dagen kermis. (2012, Uitgeverij Vrijdag)

• Stille Vriendschap. (2015, Uitgeverij Vrijdag)

• Kaartjes aan de kassa. (2016, Uitgeverij Vrijdag)

• Kopzorgen. Leven met tinnitus & hyperacusis. (2017, Uitgeverij Vrijdag)

• Wanneer zien we u terug? De laatste bed & breakfast. (2021, Uitgeverij Vrijdag)

• Een Slag Van De Molen. Beroemde kermismolens uitgelicht. (2022, Uitgeverij Vrijdag)

• We worden er niet jonger op. Hotel Solitude. (2023, Uitgeverij Vrijdag)

• Buffet Follet: Muzikale degustaties uit de jaren 60 & 70. (2024, Uitgeverij Het Punt)

• De spooktreinmoorden. (2026, Good Stuff! Books, Antwerpen)

• 100% Follet. (2026, Good Stuff! Books, Antwerpen)

Chris Van Gansbeke

Under the pseudonym Chris Van Gansbeke, he wrote a thriller/media satire that was published in late June 2022. In late August, it was announced that Follet was behind this name. The book takes aim at the world of celebrities and the media’s approach: BV-Day (2022).

== Hearing problem ==
In 1994, following an operation for a bridge angle tumour, Follet lost his hearing in one ear. He suffers from tinnitus and hyperacusis and is a patron of the Flemish association for tinnitus sufferers. He wrote a book on the subject, which was published in October 2008: ‘Oorlog In Het Hoofd’. In October 2017, he published a new book on the subject, ‘Kopzorgen’.

Due to his hearing problem, he wound down a large part of his media career.

== Trivia ==
• He makes a cameo appearance in the Kiekeboe album ‘Whiter than White’ as Mikhail Foletski. • He also made a cameo appearance in the popular comic series Samson and Gert, specifically in the album ‘Funfair on Stilts’ (1996) • His name appears in two songs: Johan Verminnen’s ‘Met Z’n Twee’ and Ed Kooyman & Herman van Haeren’s ‘’s Morgens tussen 7 en 8’. • He appeared (as himself) in two episodes of the well-known children’s series ‘Postbux X’. He appeared in episode 57, ‘Michel’s Braces’, and in episode 58, ‘Follet’s Ear’.

== External Link ==
- Personal Website of Michel Follet
