= Sanomi =

2003 song by Urban Trad

Single by Urban Trad

from the album Sanomi
- Language: Imaginary
- B-side: "Get Reel"
- Released: 2003
- Genre: Modern Celtic
- Length: 4:08
- Label: Mercury Records
- Songwriter: Yves Barbieux
- Producers: Yves Barbieux; Nicolas Vandooren

Eurovision Song Contest 2003 entry
- Country: Belgium
- Artists: Verónica Codesal; Marie-Sophie Talbot; Yves Barbieux; Didier Laloy; Dirk Naessens; Cédric Waterschoot
- As: Urban Trad
- Language: Imaginary
- Composer: Yves Barbieux
- Lyricist: Yves Barbieux

Finals performance
- Final result: 2nd
- Final points: 165

Entry chronology
- ◄ "Sister" (2002)
- "1 Life" (2004) ►

"Sanomi" is a song recorded by Belgian band Urban Trad, written by Yves Barbieux. It represented Belgium in the Eurovision Song Contest 2003, held in Riga. It was the first song not in a natural language ever performed at the contest.

== Background ==
"Sanomi" was written in an imaginary language by Yves Barbieux, a member of the Belgian folk music band Urban Trad, of which he was a part along with Verónica Codesal, Marie-Sophie Talbot, Didier Laloy, Dirk Naessens, Cédric Waterschoot, Soetkin Collier, Philip Masure, and Michel Morvan.

=== Eurovision ===
The Radio Télévision Belge de la Communauté Française (RTBF) internally selected "Sanomi" as its entry for the 48th edition of the Eurovision Song Contest. For the song to participate in the contest, it had to be shortened to fit into three minutes, and since only six people are allowed on stage, Collier, Masure, and Morvan would not perform at Eurovision.

Both versions, the standard 4:08 album version and the Eurovision 2:59 version, were released on record, the latter with Collier's vocals removed. This was because RTBF dropped Collier on the advice of the Belgian security services, who claimed that she had had far right sympathies in the past. She vigorously denied the claims, and after an investigation later that year it was concluded that the accusations were exaggerated and based on outdated information.

On 24 May 2003, the Eurovision Song Contest was held in the Skonto Hall in Riga hosted by Latvian Television (LTV) and broadcast live throughout the continent. Urban Trand performed "Sanomi" twenty-second on the evening, following Latvia's "Hello From Mars" by F.L.Y. and preceding Estonia's "Eighties Coming Back" by Ruffus. It was the first occasion that a song not in a natural language was performed at the contest.

At the close of voting, it had received 165 points, placing second in a field of twenty-six, in one of the closest finishes in the contest's history, finishing with just two fewer points than the eventual winner –"Everyway That I Can" by Sertab Erener for Turkey– and only one point above third-placed –"Ne Ver', Ne Boysia" by t.A.T.u. for Russia–. This was the second time that Belgium finished as the runner-up, the first being "L'amour ça fait chanter la vie" by Jean Vallée in 1978, and it was also the country's best placing in the contest since "J'aime la vie" by Sandra Kim victory in 1986.

== Track listing ==
1. "Sanomi" (Eurovision Edit)
2. "Get Reel"

== Chart performance ==
=== Weekly charts ===
Chart (2003)	Peak position
Belgium (Ultratop 50 Flanders)	3
Belgium (Ultratop 50 Wallonia)	3
