= Radio 2 (Belgium) =

Flemish radio station

VRT Radio2

Belgium
- Broadcast area: Flanders
- Frequencies: West Flanders: 100,1 MHz; East Flanders: 98,6 MHz; Aalst-Dendermonde-Temse: 90,7 MHz; Waasland: 89,8 MHz; Antwerpen: 97,5 MHz; Flemish Brabant: 93,7 MHz; Leuven: 88,7 MHz; Diest: 92,4 MHz; Limburg: 97,9 MHz
- Branding: Elke dag telt voor 2

Programming
- Format: Popular, regional

Ownership
- Owner: VRT

Links
- Website: www.radio2.be

Radio2 is a Belgian radio channel operated by the Flemish public broadcaster Vlaamse Radio- en Televisieomroep (VRT).

Radio2 describes itself as "the largest family in Flanders". It offers a broad choice of music with the focus on Dutch speaking and Flemish productions. By offering this kind of music, information and entertainment Radio 2 attracts a wide audience. The Radio 2 programmes focus on the daily life topics of its listeners as well as important social issues.

The regional programmes put special attention on local news. The channel’s news and information programmes concentrate on regional and national politics, culture, economy and sport.

On DAB+ and VRT's online platform VRT MAX, Radio2 offers 2 additional streams: Radio2 benenbene (with a focus on local artists) and Radio2 unwind.

== Logos and identities ==
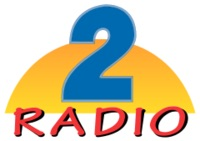
VRT Radio 2's previous logo used until 2003.

VRT Radio 2's previous logo from 2003 to 2014.

VRT Radio 2's previous logo from 2014 to 2022.

VRT Radio 2's previous logo from 2022 to 2025.

VRT Radio 2's current from 2025-present.

== Regional variations ==
Radio 2 is broadcast in five regional versions during the week, each with its own regional news bulletins (up to 6 per day) and dedicated sequences at midday (De Middag, Mon–Fri, 12-13). The five regions concerned are:

=== Radio2 in Antwerpen ===
- Based in: Antwerp, Antwerp
- Frequencies: 97.5 FM
- Presenters: Nathalie Allard, Els Broekmans, Jelle Cleymans, Maarten Cox, Sam De Meulder, Kris Luyten, Sharon Slegers, Nathalie Sterckx, Tine Van Hauteghem, Dennis van den Buijs

=== Radio2 in Limburg ===
- Based in: Hasselt, Limburg
- Frequencies: 97.9 FM
- Presenters: Sander Beusen, Eva Droogmans, Daan Masset, Kaat Mendonck, Leen Paredis

=== Radio2 in Oost-Vlaanderen ===
- Based in: Ghent, East Flanders
- Frequencies: 89.8, 90.7 and 98.6 FM
- Presenters: Ilse De Roeck, Dirk Ghys, Peter Hermans, Geert Houck, Nico Teirlinck, Niki Vandriessche, Joyce Verdonck, Jasper Verhulst

=== Radio2 in Vlaams-Brabant ===
- Based in: Leuven, Flemish Brabant
- Frequencies: 88.7, 92.4 and 93.7 FM
- Presenters: Catherine Callens, Jeroen Guns, Catherine Lekime, Kristel Smout

=== Radio2 in West-Vlaanderen ===
- Based in: Kortrijk, West Flanders
- Frequencies: 100.1 FM
- Presenters: Nico Blontrock, Margot Derycke, Jens Lemant, Herbert Verhaeghe

== Charts ==
The Ultratop 50 chart for Flanders has existed separately from the Ultratop Wallonia chart since 31 March 1995. Prior to 1995, the official IFPI Belgium charts which covered both the French speaking part of Belgium (Wallonia) and the Dutch speaking part of Belgium (Flanders) were compiled based on shipments from distributors to retailers and not on sales from retailers to customers. However, this chart coexisted with a weekly Flemish chart that was based on actual sales from retailers to customers known as the Radio 2 Top 30 (previously known as the BRT Top 30) and which was broadcast by VRT, also known as BRT and BRTN. The VRT chart, also known as BRT and BRTN, was the most popular chart in Belgium with around one million listeners per week and was based on sales from up to 100 stores in Belgium. After Ultratop started publishing the official charts in 1995, Radio 2 started publishing and broadcasting the Ultratop charts. The charts archived on the Ultratop website from before when Ultratop started compiling the charts in 1995 are taken from the book Het Belgisch hitboek: 45 jaar hits in Vlaanderen: 1954-1999 by Robert Collin which in turn uses a variety of sources.
