= No No Never =

2006 song by Texas Lightning

Single by Texas Lightning

from the album Meanwhile, Back at the Ranch
- B-side: "Waterloo"; "I Can't Get Your Horse Off My Mind"
- Released: 26 March 2006
- Recorded: January 2006
- Studio: Gaga (Hamburg, Germany)
- Genre: Country
- Length: 3:00
- Label: X-Cell
- Composer(s): Jane Comerford
- Lyricist(s): Jane Comerford
- Producer(s): Stephan Gade

Texas Lightning singles chronology
"Like a Virgin" (2005)	"No No Never" (2006)	"I Promise" (2006)

Eurovision Song Contest 2006 entry
- Country: Germany
- Artist(s): Jane Comerford; Markus Schmidt; Olli Dittrich; Jon Flemming Olsen; Uwe Frenzel
- As: Texas Lightning
- Language: English
- Composer(s): Jane Comerford
- Lyricist(s): Jane Comerford

Finals performance
- Final result: 14th
- Final points: 36

Entry chronology
- ◄ "Run & Hide" (2005)
- "Frauen regier'n die Welt" (2007) ►

"No No Never" was the German entry in the Eurovision Song Contest 2006, performed in English by Texas Lightning. While Germany had finished the 2005 contest in last place, their position as one of the Contest's "Big Four" (along with the United Kingdom, France and Spain) ensured the song an automatic final berth. Thus, it was performed eighth on the night, following Malta's Fabrizio Faniello with "I Do" and preceding Denmark's Sidsel Ben Semmane with "Twist of Love". At the close of voting, it had received 36 points, placing 14th in a field of 24.

"No No Never" was also issued as a single in German-speaking Europe, serving as the second release from Texas Lightning's first album, Meanwhile, Back at the Ranch (2005), in 2006. In Germany, the song spent 39 weeks on the German Singles Chart, reaching number one for three nonconsecutive weeks in May and June 2006. It ended the year as Germany's second-best-selling hit and was certified platinum by the Bundesverband Musikindustrie (BVMI). In Austria and Switzerland, the song peaked within the top 10.

== Composition ==
Written and composed by Australian-born band member Jane Comerford, the unusual choice of country as the genre resulted in BBC commentator Terry Wogan asking jokingly and with a rough approximation of the appropriate accent "are we in Athens, Georgia?" at the end of the performance (the contest was held in Athens, Greece). Lyrically, the song can be read as a pledge of the singer's undying love for her lover, but Comerford has stated that the chorus at least—"I'm never ever gonna leave you to cry on your own / Never ever gonna not go and pick up the phone / I'm never ever gonna let you be chilled to the bone"—was inspired by her desire to comfort her niece upon the untimely death of her father.

== Eurovision Song Contest ==
As a member of the "Big Five," Germany automatically qualified to compete in the final of the Eurovision Song Contest 2006 on 20 May 2006. The running order for the final in addition to the semi-final was decided through an allocation draw on 21 March 2006, and Germany was subsequently drawn to perform in position 8 in the final, following the entry from Malta and before the entry from Denmark. At the conclusion of the final, Germany placed fourteenth in the final, scoring 36 points.

The German performance saw the musicians wearing beige suits and stetson hats and Comerford wearing a pink dress. Texas Lighntning eventually placed fourteenth out of the 24 participating countries with 36 points. "No No Never" was succeeded as the German representative at the Eurovision Song Contest 2007 by Roger Cicero with "Frauen regier'n die Welt".

== Track listings ==
All tracks produced by Stephan Gade, with co-production by Texas Lightning.

German maxi-CD single
No.	Title	Writer(s)	Length
1.	"No No Never"	Jane Comerford	3:00
2.	"Waterloo"	Benny Andersson; Björn Ulvaeus	2:47
3.	"I Can't Get Your Horse Off My Mind"	Jon Flemming Olsen	2:50
4.	"No No Never" (video)		3:13
5.	"Interview video" (video)		5:17
6.	"Live photo gallery"

European CD single
No.	Title	Writer(s)	Length
1.	"No No Never"	Comerford	3:00
2.	"Waterloo"	Andersson; Ulvaeus	2:47

== Credits and personnel ==
Credits are lifted from the German maxi-CD single liner notes.

Studios

- Recorded and mixed in January 2006 at Gaga Studio (Hamburg, Germany)
- Mastered at Soundgarden Studio (Hamburg, Germany)

Texas Lightning

- Jane Comerford – music, lyrics, lead vocals, ukulele
- Jon Flemming Olsen – guitars, art direction and design
- Markus Schmidt – electric guitars, banjo
- Uwe Frenzel – bass
- Olli Dittrich – drums
- Texas Lightning – co-production

Additional personnel

- Nils Tuxen – pedal steel guitar
- Stephan Gade – production, mixing
- Marc Schettler – mixing, engineering
- Chris von Rautenkranz – mastering

== Charts ==
=== Weekly charts ===
Weekly chart performance for "No No Never"
Chart (2006)	Peak position
Austria (Ö3 Austria Top 40)	4
Europe (Eurochart Hot 100)	6
Germany (GfK)	1
Germany Airplay (BVMI)	3
Switzerland (Schweizer Hitparade)	6

=== Year-end charts ===
Year-end chart performance for "No No Never"
Chart (2006)	Position
Austria (Ö3 Austria Top 40)	21
Europe (Eurochart Hot 100)	31
Germany (Media Control GfK)	2
Switzerland (Schweizer Hitparade)	32

=== Decade-end charts ===
Decade-end chart performance for "No No Never"
Chart (2000–2009)	Position
Germany (Media Control GfK)	17

== Certifications ==
Certifications for "No No Never"
Region	Certification	Certified units/sales
Germany (BVMI)	Platinum	300,000^{^}
^{^} Shipments figures based on certification alone.

Preceded by "Run & Hide" by Gracia	Germany in the Eurovision Song Contest; 2006	Succeeded by "Frauen regier'n die Welt" by Roger Cicero
