= Germany in the Eurovision Song Contest 2007 =

- Eurovision Song Contest 2007
- Participating broadcaster: ARD (Note: Arbeitsgemeinschaft der öffentlich-rechtlichen Rundfunkanstalten der Bundesrepublik Deutschland) – Norddeutscher Rundfunk (NDR)
- Country: Germany
- Selection process: Der deutsche Vorentscheid 2007 – Wer singt für Deutschland?
- Selection date: 8 March 2007

Competing entry
- Song: "Frauen regier'n die Welt"
- Artist: Roger Cicero
- Songwriters: Matthias Haß; Frank Ramond

Placement
- Final result: 19th, 49 points

Participation chronology

Germany was represented at the Eurovision Song Contest 2007 with the song "Frauen regier'n die Welt", written by Matthias Haß and Frank Ramond, and performed by Roger Cicero. The German participating broadcaster on behalf of ARD, Norddeutscher Rundfunk (NDR), organised the national final Der deutsche Vorentscheid 2007 – Wer singt für Deutschland? in order to select their entry for the contest. The national final took place on 8 March 2007 and featured three competing acts with the winner being selected through public televoting. "Frauen regier'n die Welt" performed by Roger Cicero was selected as the German entry for Eurovision after gaining 70% of the votes.

As a member of the "Big Four", Germany automatically qualified to compete in the final of the Eurovision Song Contest. Performing in position 16, Germany placed nineteenth out of the 24 participating countries with 49 points.

== Background ==
Prior to the 2007 contest, ARD had participated in the Eurovision Song Contest representing Germany fifty times since its debut in 1956. It has won the contest on one occasion: in 1982 with the song "Ein bißchen Frieden" performed by Nicole. Germany, to this point, has been noted for having appeared in the contest more than any other country; they have competed in every contest since the first edition in 1956 except for 1996 when it was eliminated in a pre-contest elimination round. In 2006, "No No Never" performed by Texas Lightning placed fourteenth out of twenty-four competing songs scoring 36 points.

As part of its duties as participating broadcaster, ARD organises the selection of its entry in the Eurovision Song Contest and broadcasts the event in the country. Since 1996, ARD had delegated the participation in the contest to its member Norddeutscher Rundfunk (NDR). NDR confirmed that it would participate in the 2007 contest on 7 December 2006. Since 1996, NDR has set up national finals with several artists to choose both the song and performer to compete at Eurovision for Germany. Along with their participation confirmation, the broadcaster announced that it would organise a multi-artist national final to select its 2007 entry.

== Before Eurovision ==
=== Der deutsche Vorentscheid 2007 – Wer singt für Deutschland? ===
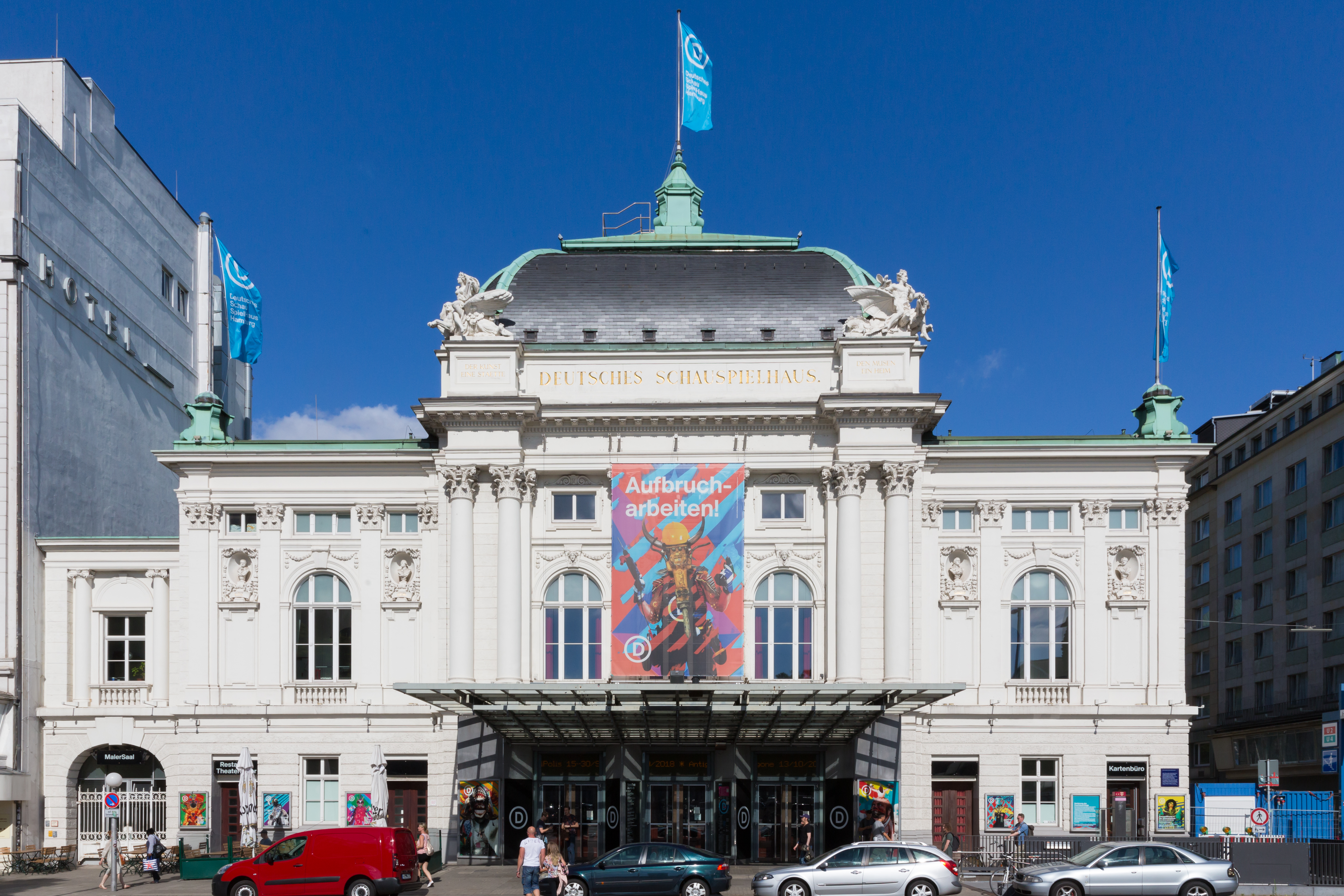
The Deutsches Schauspielhaus in Hamburg was the host venue of Der deutsche Vorentscheid 2007 – Wer singt für Deutschland?

Der deutsche Vorentscheid 2007 – Wer singt für Deutschland? (English: The German Preliminary Decision 2007 – Who sings for Germany?) was the competition organised by NDR to select its entry for the Eurovision Song Contest 2007. The competition took place on 8 March 2007 at the Deutsches Schauspielhaus in Hamburg, hosted by Thomas Hermanns. Three acts competed during the show with the winner being selected through a public televote. The show was broadcast on Das Erste as well as online via the broadcaster's Eurovision Song Contest website eurovision.de. The national final was watched by 4.6 million viewers in Germany with a market share of 14.3%.

==== Competing entries ====
Three acts were selected by a panel consisting of ARD heads of entertainment, which included head of the talk and entertainment department for NDR and head of German delegation for Eurovision Jan Schulte-Kellinghaus. Monrose and Roger Cicero were announced as the first two competing artists on 20 December 2006, and Heinz Rudolf Kunze was announced as the third act on 23 January 2007.

Artist	Song	Songwriter(s)
Heinz Rudolf Kunze	"Die Welt ist Pop"	Heinz Rudolf Kunze
Monrose	"Even Heaven Cries"	Jonas Jeberg; Robert S. Nevil; Lauren Evans; Jens Lomholt; Philip Dencker Jones
Roger Cicero	"Frauen regier'n die Welt"	Matthias Haß; Frank Ramond

==== Final ====
The televised final took place on 8 March 2007. The winner, "Frauen regier'n die Welt" performed by Roger Cicero, was selected solely through public televoting, including options for landline and SMS voting. In addition to the performances of the competing entries, each of the participating artists performed a former Eurovision Song Contest song, while former Eurovision entrants Bucks Fizz, Gitte Hænning, Johnny Logan, Katrina Leskanich, Siw Malmkvist, Texas Lightning, and Wenche Myhre performed their respective entries. Approximately 900,000 votes were cast in the final.

Final – 8 March 2007
R/O	Artist	Song (Original artists)	R/O	Song	Televote	Place
1	Heinz Rudolf Kunze	"Merci, Chérie" (Udo Jürgens)	4	"Die Welt ist Pop"	10%	3
2	Monrose	"Wunder gibt es immer wieder" (Katja Ebstein)	5	"Even Heaven Cries"	20%	2
3	Roger Cicero	"Zwei kleine Italiener" (Conny Froboess)	6	"Frauen regier'n die Welt"	70%	1

=== Controversy ===
The lyrics of the winning song were criticised by Germany's feminist magazine EMMA. They voted Roger Cicero "Pasha of the Month" (a title for men who display chauvinist attitudes) because of the song's lyrics. They were of the opinion that the line und schon öffnen sich Tasche und Herz und dann kaufst du 'n Ring und 'n Nerz (translation: "and soon your wallet and heart open and then you buy a ring and mink coat") was antiquated.

== At Eurovision ==
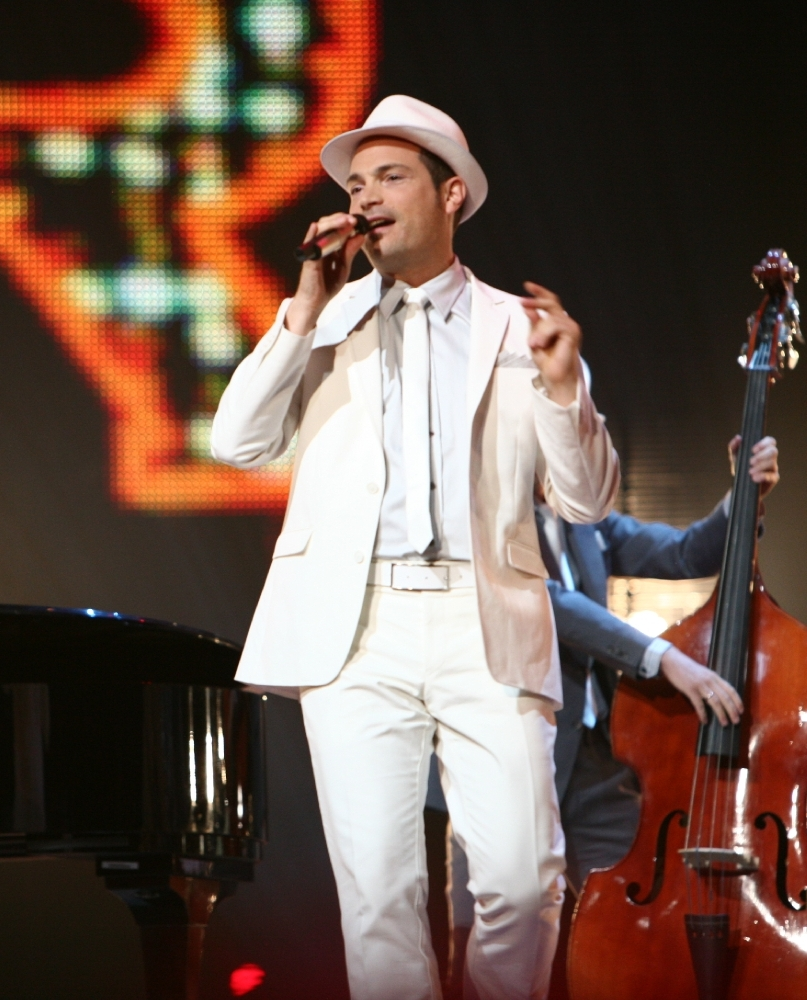
Roger Cicero performing at the Eurovision Song Contest

According to Eurovision rules, all nations with the exceptions of the host country, the "Big Four" (France, Germany, Spain, and the United Kingdom) and the ten highest placed finishers in the 2006 contest are required to qualify for the semi-final in order to compete for the final; the top ten countries from the semi-final progress to the final. As a member of the "Big Four", Germany automatically qualified to compete in the final on 12 May 2007. In addition to their participation in the final, Germany is also required to broadcast and vote in the semi-final on 10 May 2007.

In Germany, the two shows were broadcast on Das Erste which featured commentary by Peter Urban. The final was also broadcast on hr3 which featured commentary by Tim Frühling and on NDR 2 which featured commentary by Thomas Mohr. The final was watched by 7.41 million viewers in Germany, which meant a market share of 30.1 per cent. NDR appointed Thomas Hermanns as its spokesperson to announced the top 12-point score awarded by the German televote during the final.

=== Final ===
Roger Cicero took part in technical rehearsals on 7 and 8 May, followed by dress rehearsals on 11 and 12 May. During the running order draw for the semi-final and final on 12 March 2007, Germany was placed to perform in position 16 in the final, following the entry from Russia and before the entry from Serbia. The German performance featured Roger Cicero performing on stage in a white suit with two brass players, a drummer, a pianist and a cellist. The LED screens displayed Cicero's name in big letters that changed colours from orange to green at the end the song. The five musicians that joined Roger Cicero on stage were Dirk Lentschat (trumpet), Stephan Abel (saxophone), Matthias Meusel (drums), Lutz Krajenski (piano) and Hervé Jeanne (cello). Germany placed nineteenth in the final, scoring 49 points.

After Cicero's disappointing finish at the Eurovision, German newspaper Der Spiegel commented on the song's genre: "Swing is actually a pop music antiquity that you have to be historically receptive to." The CD single of "Frauen regier'n die Welt" charted in Germany, peaking at number 7 in the official German charts; it also charted in other German-language markets, peaking at number 51 in Austria's Ö3 Top 40 and number 64 in Switzerland's Hitparade.

=== Voting ===
Below is a breakdown of points awarded to Germany and awarded by Germany in the semi-final and grand final of the contest. The nation awarded its 12 points both in the semi-final and the grand final of the contest to Turkey.

==== Points awarded to Germany ====
Points awarded to Germany (Final)
Score	Country
12 points	
10 points	
8 points	
7 points	Austria; Switzerland
6 points	Albania; Netherlands
5 points	Andorra; Denmark; Spain
4 points	
3 points	Estonia
2 points	Iceland
1 point	Finland; Sweden; United Kingdom

==== Points awarded by Germany ====
Points awarded by Germany (Semi-final)
Score	Country
12 points	Turkey
10 points	Serbia
8 points	Switzerland
7 points	Portugal
6 points	Hungary
5 points	Poland
4 points	Bulgaria
3 points	Cyprus
2 points	Croatia
1 point	Albania

Points awarded by Germany (Final)
Score	Country
12 points	Turkey
10 points	Greece
8 points	Serbia
7 points	Hungary
6 points	Russia
5 points	Ukraine
4 points	Bulgaria
3 points	Bosnia and Herzegovina
2 points	Armenia
1 point	Finland
