= Somebody Sent Me an Angel =

Somebody Sent Me An Angel

Studio album by Jane Comerford
- Released: 1997
- Genre: Pop Rock
- Label: Polydor (Universal)

Somebody Sent Me An Angel is the debut album of the Australian singer and songwriter Jane Comerford. It was first released in 1997 in Germany and re-released on 2 May 2006 after Jane Comerford and the band Texas Lightning represented Germany at the Eurovision Song Contest in 2006.

== Track listing ==
1. "I Feel Herzschmerz"
2. "Do It Again"
3. "Deep In Distress"
4. "My Love And I"
5. "Secrets In My Daddy's Eyes"
6. "Head Over Heels"
7. "My Shirell"
8. "Teardrop"
9. "Still Wild At Heart"
10. "Do It Again" (unplugged)
11. "Epilogue" (instrumental)
