= Meanwhile, Back at the Ranch (album) =

Meanwhile, Back at the Ranch...

Studio album by Texas Lightning
- Released: 2005
- Recorded: 11–17 July 2005
- Genre: Pop; country
- Length: 51:35
- Label: Sony BMG
- Producer: Stephan Gade, Co-produced by Texas Lightning

Meanwhile, Back at the Golden Ranch
- Special edition re-release cover

Meanwhile, Back at the Ranch... is a pop/country album by the German band Texas Lightning, made up of country-style covers of pop songs. The album was re-released on 3 March 2006, including the song "No No Never" from Texas Lightning's Eurovision entry. "No No Never" has music & lyrics written by Jane Comerford; it was a huge hit all over Europe in 2006, and Germany's entry for that year's Eurovision finals.

The band Texas Lightning was created by Jon Flemming Olsen and the graphic designer who designs their CD covers and promotional material. Olsen, whose Texas Lightning persona is Johnny "the Flame" Olsen is also on a popular German television show, a contemporary-events conversational satire named Ditsche, which stars another member of the band, drummer Olli Dittrich.

== Track listing ==
1. "Bad Case of Loving You" – 2:54 covering Robert Palmer
2. "Like a Virgin" – 3:24 covering Madonna
3. "No No Never" – 3:01 Eurovision entry written by Jane
4. "Kiss" – 4:08 covering Prince
5. "Over the Mountains" – 4:30 Translation of "Über den Wolken" by Reinhard Mey. Translated into English by Jon Flemming Olsen.
6. "C'est La Vie" – 2:50 covering Chuck Berry
7. "Highway to Hell" – 3:49 covering AC/DC
8. "Dancing Queen" – 3:31 covering ABBA
9. "Man in the Mirror" – 4:12 covering Michael Jackson
10. "Norwegian Wood" – 2:17 covering The Beatles
11. "Smoke, Smoke, Smoke (That Cigarette)" – 3:23 covering Tex Williams
12. "Walking After Midnight" – 2:15 covering Patsy Cline
13. "Raindrops Keep Falling on My Head" – 2:26 covering B. J. Thomas
14. "Walk on the Wild Side" – 4:10 covering Lou Reed
15. "Blue Bayou" – 4:18 covering Roy Orbison

== Re-release ==
The album was re-released on 13 October 2006, titled Meanwhile, Back at the Golden Ranch and containing six new songs but removing "Walking After Midnight". Because of the new material, the CD-ROM bonus content was removed from the CD, but the album is available with a live DVD containing concert footage.

1. "Bad Case of Loving You" – 2:54
2. "Like a Virgin" – 3:22
3. "I Promise" – 3:12
4. "No No Never" – 3:01
5. "Kiss" – 4:07
6. "Enjoy the Silence" – 3:22
7. "C'est La Vie" – 2:50
8. "Over the Mountains" – 4:30
9. "Man in the Mirror" – 4:12
10. "Dancing Queen" – 3:31
11. "Highway to Hell" – 3:48
12. "You're the Voice" – 4:00 covering John Farnham
13. "Norwegian Wood" – 2:17
14. "Nothing Compares 2 U" – 3:33 covering Sinéad O'Connor
15. "Out There Somewhere" – 3:24
16. "Raindrops Keep Falling On My Head" – 2:27
17. "Blue Bayou" – 4:19
18. "Smoke, Smoke, Smoke (That Cigarette)" – 3:23
19. "Walk On the Wild Side" – 4:08
20. "This Is Me" – 3:52
