= Anyone's Daughter =

German progressive rock band

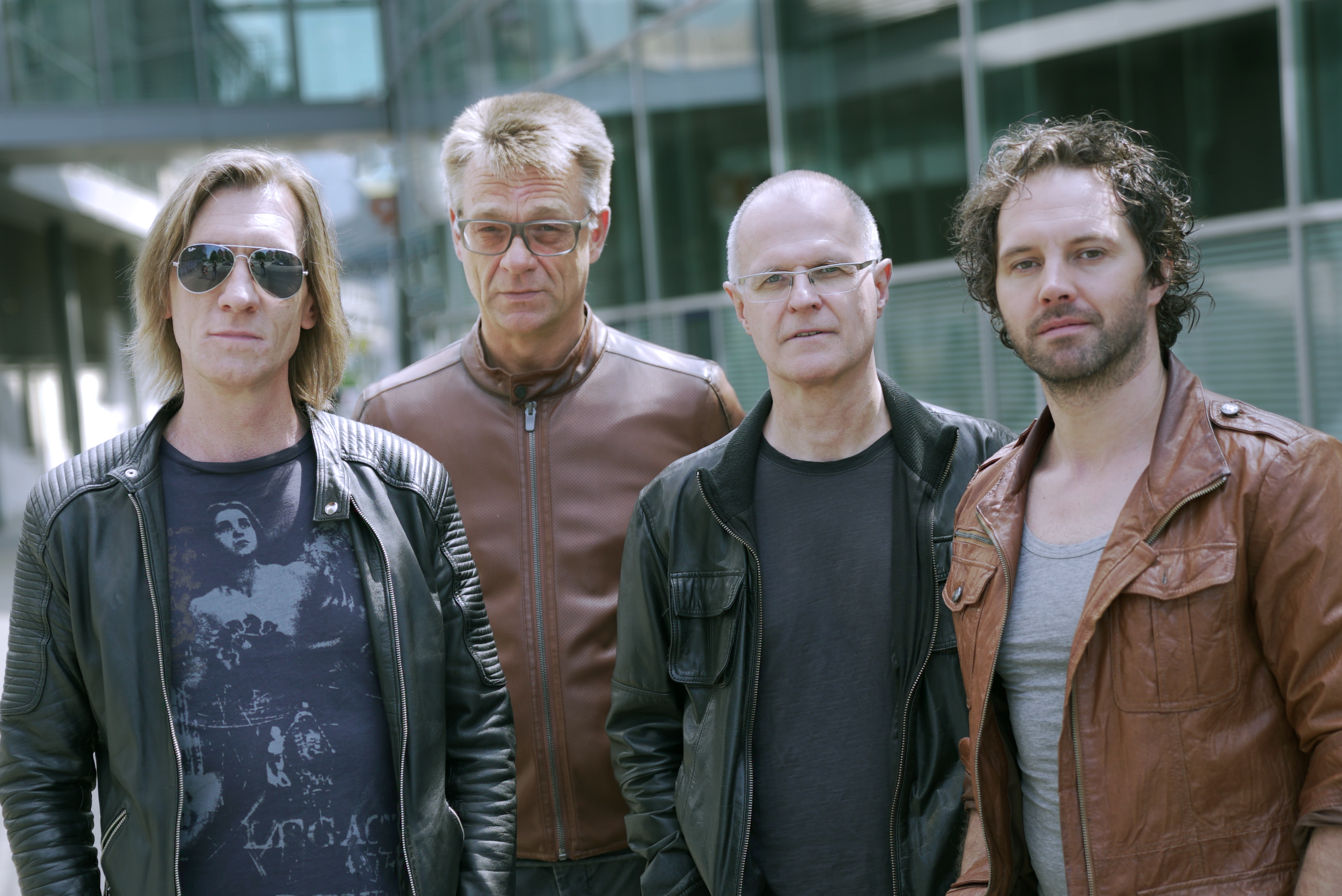
- Anyone's Daughter, (2018).

Background information
- Origin: Stuttgart, Germany
- Genres: Progressive rock, symphonic rock
- Years active: 1972–1984; 1986; 2000–present
- Labels: Brain, Spiegelei, Intercord, Belle Antique, Music Is Intelligence, Tempus Fugit, ePark, InsideOut, In-Akustik
- Members: Matthias Ulmer; Uwe Metzler; John Vooijs; Peter Kumpf
- Past members: Andre Carswell; Uwe Karpa; Sascha Pavlovic; Hans Derer; Harald Bareth; Kono Konopik; Peter Schmidt; Goetz Steeger; Michael Braun; Andi Kemmer; Raoul Walton
- Website: www.anyonesdaughter.de

Anyone's Daughter is a German progressive rock band, formed in 1972. It consists of Uwe Karpa, Matthias Ulmer, Harald Bareth, and Kono Konopik. They are considered Progressive rock, similar to German bands like Eloy and Novalis.

== History ==
The band started out playing covers of Deep Purple and others, and gave themselves the name after the Deep Purple song was released in 1971. The group went through a number of personnel changes before they released their first album Adonis, in 1979.

Their third album was their first album in their native language; German. "Piktors Verwandlungen," a 40-minute piece of music written for a fairy tale by German author Hermann Hesse, was narrated by the band's singer and bassist Harald Bareth.

Upon the release of two more albums and after Bareth's departure in 1984 due to military service commitments, the band drifted apart.

Karpa and Ulmer briefly reformed the group in 1986 with new musicians. The songs that were recorded at that time were released onto the album "Last Tracks"; the group's last release until they reunited again in 2000.

Two years after, they performed in Calw, in a festival honouring German author Hermann Hesse. On this occasion "Piktors Verwandlungen" was narrated by Heinz Rudolf Kunze.

After the release of two more studio albums, the group became a trio, releasing a live album. Uwe Karpa left the group in 2015 due to solo project commitments, leaving Matthias Ulmer the sole remaining consistent member.

== Line-ups ==
1972-197? Uwe Karpa (g), Matthias Ulmer (k, voc), Sascha Pavlovic (dr)

197?-1978 Uwe Karpa (g), Matthias Ulmer (k, voc), Hans Derer (dr), Harald Bareth (voc, b)

1978-1981 Uwe Karpa (g), Matthias Ulmer (k, voc), Kono Konopik (dr), Harald Bareth (voc, b)

1981-1984 Uwe Karpa (g), Matthias Ulmer (k, voc), Peter Schmidt (dr), Harald Bareth (voc, b)

1986 Uwe Karpa (g), Matthias Ulmer (k, voc), Goetz Steeger (dr, voc), Michael Braun (voc, k), Andi Kemmer (b)

2000-2006 Uwe Karpa (g), Matthias Ulmer (k, voc), Peter Kumpf (dr), Andre Carswell (voc), Raoul Walton (b)

2006-2015 Uwe Karpa (g), Matthias Ulmer (k, voc), Andre Carswell (voc)

2015-2017: Uwe Metzler (g), Matthias Ulmer (k, voc), Andre Carswell (voc)

2018–present: Uwe Metzler (g), Matthias Ulmer (k, voc), Peter Kumpf (dr), John Vooijs (voc)

== Discography ==
- Adonis (1979)
- Anyone's Daughter (1980)
- Piktors Verwandlungen (1981)
- In Blau (1982)
- Neue Sterne (1983)
- Live (1984)
- Last Tracks (1986)
- Danger World (2001)
- Requested Document Live 1980-1983 (2001)
- Requested Document Live 1980-1983: Vol. 2 (2001)
- Wrong (2004)
- Trio Tour (2006)
- Calw Live (2011)
- Living the Future (2018)
