= Roger Cicero =

German jazz and pop musician (1970–2016)

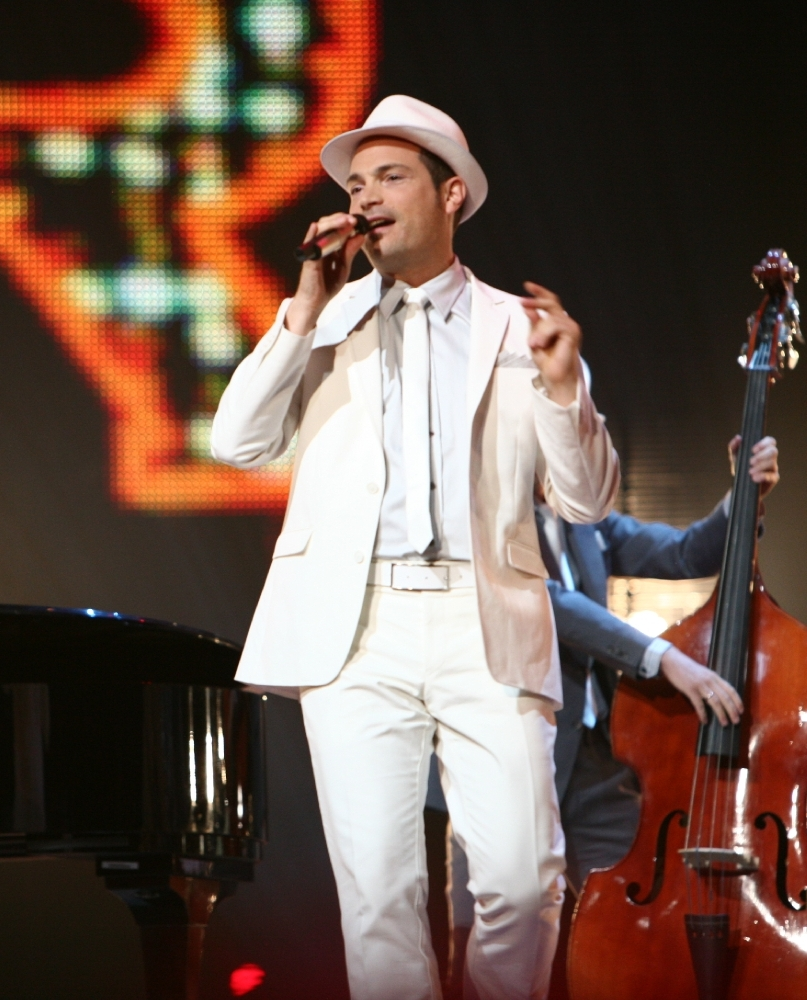
- Cicero performing at the Eurovision Song Contest 2007

Background information
- Born: Roger Marcel Cicero Ciceu; 6 July 1970; West Berlin, West Germany
- Died: 24 March 2016 (aged 45) Hamburg, Germany
- Genres: Jazz, pop
- Occupations: Musician, songwriter
- Years active: 2003–2016
- Label: Starwatch Music
- Website: roger-cicero.de

Roger Marcel Cicero Ciceu (6 July 1970 – 24 March 2016) was a German jazz and pop musician.

== Biography ==
Roger Cicero was born in 1970 in Berlin to Romanian jazz pianist Eugen Cicero and dancer Lili Cziczeo.

Cicero represented Germany at the Eurovision Song Contest 2007 in Helsinki his song "Frauen regier'n die Welt" (lit. "Women Rule the World" / English-language version: "Guess Who Rules the World"). He finished 19th.

In 2014, he was one of the stars of the Vox television show "Sing meinen Song – Das Tauschkonzert" (Sing my song – the exchange concert) along with Xavier Naidoo, Sasha, Andreas Gabalier, Sandra Nasić and Gregor Meyle.

In 24 March 2016 Cicero died of a ischemic stroke. His father, Eugen Cicero, had also died from the same cause.

== Filmography ==
Year	Title	Role	Notes
2009	Hilde	Ricci Blum	
2009	The Princess and the Frog	Prince Naveen	German version

== Books ==
- 2010: Weggefährten. Meine Songs fürs Leben, Rowohlt, Berlin ISBN 978-3-499-62652-4.

Preceded by Texas Lightning with "No No Never"	Germany in the Eurovision Song Contest; 2007	Succeeded by No Angels with "Disappear"
