= Mads Vangsø =

Danish comedian

Mads Vangsø is a Danish comedian.

Mads Vangsø gained popularity with "Tæskeholdet" alongside Jan Gintberg, Søren Søndergaard and Casper Christensen. "Tæskeholdet" was a huge success on P3 (largest radio station in Denmark), and even appeared on television following the enormous popularity. The show debuted in 1996, and ended in 1997 where the four members went their separate ways.

Mads Vangsø went on to become the host on many shows, including the first Danish edition of Big Brother in 2001.

In 2005, Mads Vangsø had another radio success with Monkey Business, together with Adam Duvå Hall. The duo hosted the Danish Melodi Grand Prix 2006 (the Danish national final for the Eurovision Song Contest), and brought a new style to the contest. Mads Vangsø was the Danish represantive on a series of Swedish television programmes where five Scandinavians (one from each country in Scandinavia) would give their opinion on the songs of the contest.

Mads Vangsø was also the Danish commentator of the Eurovision Song Contest 2006.
