= Trine Jepsen =

Danish singer and actress

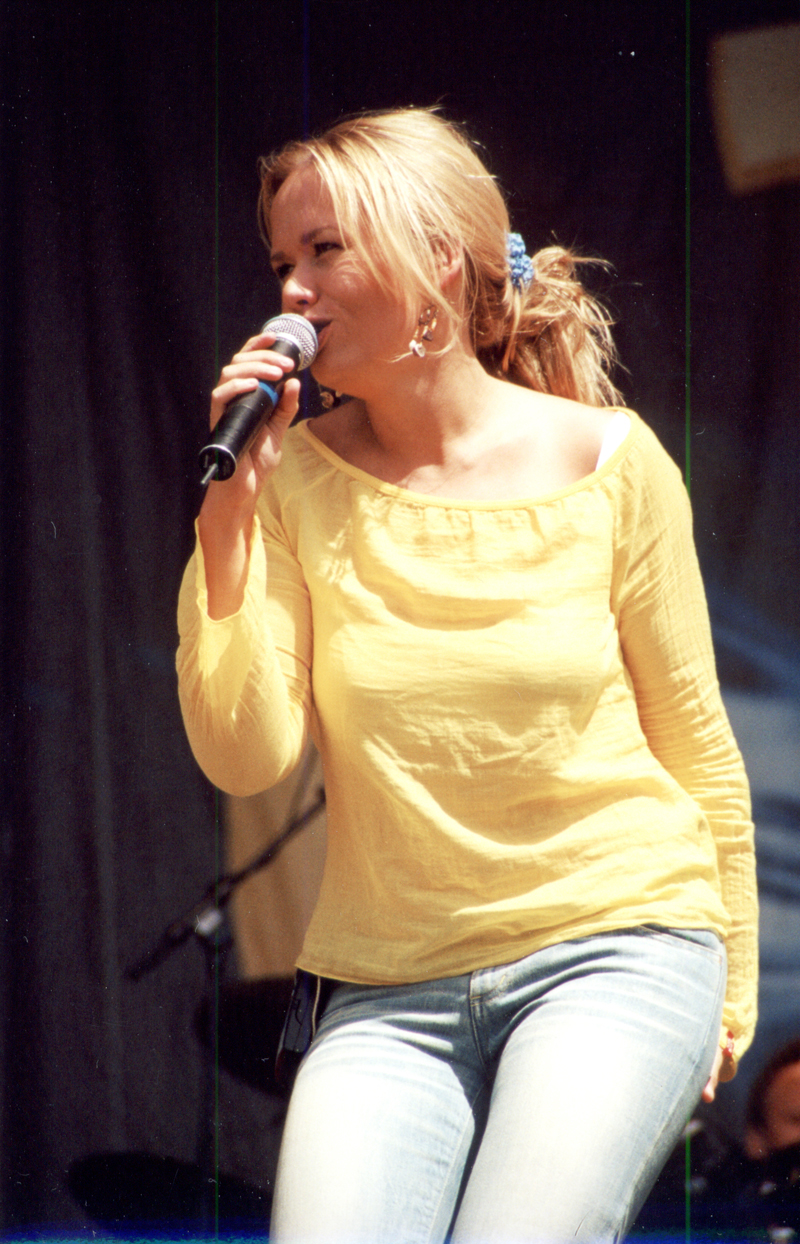
- Jepsen during a concert with EyeQ

Background information
- Born: Trine Randbo Jepsen; 29 September 1977 (age 48)
- Origin: Holsted, Denmark
- Genres: Pop, schlager
- Occupations: Singer; actress; television presenter
- Years active: 1999–present

Trine Randbo Jakobsen (nee Jepsen; born 29 September 1977) is a Danish singer, actress and television presenter. Trine became known when she along with Michael Teschl won Dansk Melodi Grand Prix 1999 and got to represent Denmark in the Eurovision Song Contest 1999 in Jerusalem with the song "Denne Gang". The duo sang the English version of the song "This Time I mean It". In 2001, she participated in the first season of Popstars which was broadcast on TV2.

She won and got one of the spots as a member of the girl group EyeQ, the group went on to be one of the most commercially successful groups in Denmark with 250,000 sold albums until they disbanded in 2003. in 2005 she starred as the singer Wilma in Gladsaxe Ny Teaters rendition of the play Maratondansen, where she acted along with Dejan Čukić, Iben Hjejle and Paw Henriksen. In 2006 she participated in Dansk Melodi Grand Prix 2006 in a duet with Christian Bach with the song "Grib Mig". In the same year she toured along with Stig Rossen, where she was a guest soloist for his Christmas concert tour. In October 2006 she became a television presenter for the show Quix Direkte at TV2 along with Maria Hirse and Tina Bilsbo.

She hosted the 2007 season of the Kanal 4 dating show Bonde søger brud. She also played the leading role of Tante Sofie in the musical Folk og røvere i Kardemomme by, and the lead role of Grizabella in Cats. In 2008 she played the character Belle in the Danish version of the musical Beauty and the Beast and also in the play Baronessen på Benzintanken. She also became a radio presenter for Skala FM for their morning show, a place she held until August 2011. She again participated in Dansk Melodi Grand Prix 2009 with the song "I'll Never Fall in Love Again". In 2010 she played the role of Ursula in Den lille Havfrue at Musikteatret in Holstebro. In 2011, she participated in the ABBA musical The Visitors at Musikhuset Aarhus. In 2012, she had the leading role in the musical Evita at the Black Box Theatre in Holstebro.

As of 2019, Jakobsen is director of the Schackenborg Foundation.

Preceded by Kølig Kaj with Stemmen i mit liv	Denmark in the Eurovision Song Contest; 1999 (with Michael Teschl)	Succeeded by Olsen Brothers with Fly on the Wings of Love
