= Jakob Sveistrup =

Danish singer (born 1972)

Jakob Sveistrup Hansen
- Born: 8 March 1972 (age 53); Copenhagen, Denmark
- Origin: Hjallese, Denmark
- Genres: Pop, R&B, soul, blues
- Occupations: Singer, songwriter
- Years active: 2003–present

Jakob Sveistrup (born 8 March 1972) is a Danish singer. He entered the Danish music scene in 2003 as a competitor in the Danish televised talent contest Stjerne for en aften ("Star for a Night"). He made it to the finals. Unusually, Sveistrup was not a professional singer; he was a teacher for autistic children. However, in March 2006, Jakob resigned from this job to be a full-time musician.

Jakob then went on to compete in the Dansk Melodi Grand Prix, which took place at the Forum in Horsens on 12 February 2005. He was selected as winner of the competition by national telephone voting for his performance of the song "Tænder på dig" by Jacob Launbjerg & Andreas Mørck.

This led to him representing Denmark in the Eurovision Song Contest 2005 with the translated song, now called "Talking to You". The contest was hosted by Kyiv, Ukraine on 21 May 2005.

Since Denmark was not pre-qualified for the final, Jakob took part in the semi-final on 19 May 2005. He qualified for the final, and finished 10th.

He was a guest performer at Congratulations, the 50th anniversary Eurovision concert in Copenhagen, Denmark, in October 2005.

In May 2005 he released his first album, the self-titled Jakob Sveistrup. His second album, Fragments, was released in August 2006. His third album 3, was released in April 2007. Hope to Find, his fourth album was released in September 2009. His fifth album Runaway was released in June 2012. He released his sixth album in November 2015, entitled 10: Back to Beginning.

Jakob is also known as the former leadsinger in the Danish cover band Copycats www.copycats.dk.

Sveistrup has been married to Iben Andersen since 27 May 2000.

== Albums ==
- "Jakob Sveistrup" (2005)
- "Fragments" (2006)
- "All In / All Out" (2016)
- "In Your Face" (2018)
- "LIVE 2020" (2021)

| Preceded by Tomas Thordarson with Shame on You | Denmark in the Eurovision Song Contest; 2005 | Succeeded by Sidsel Ben Semmane with Twist of Love |
