= Heinz Rudolf Kunze =

German writer and rock singer (born 1956)

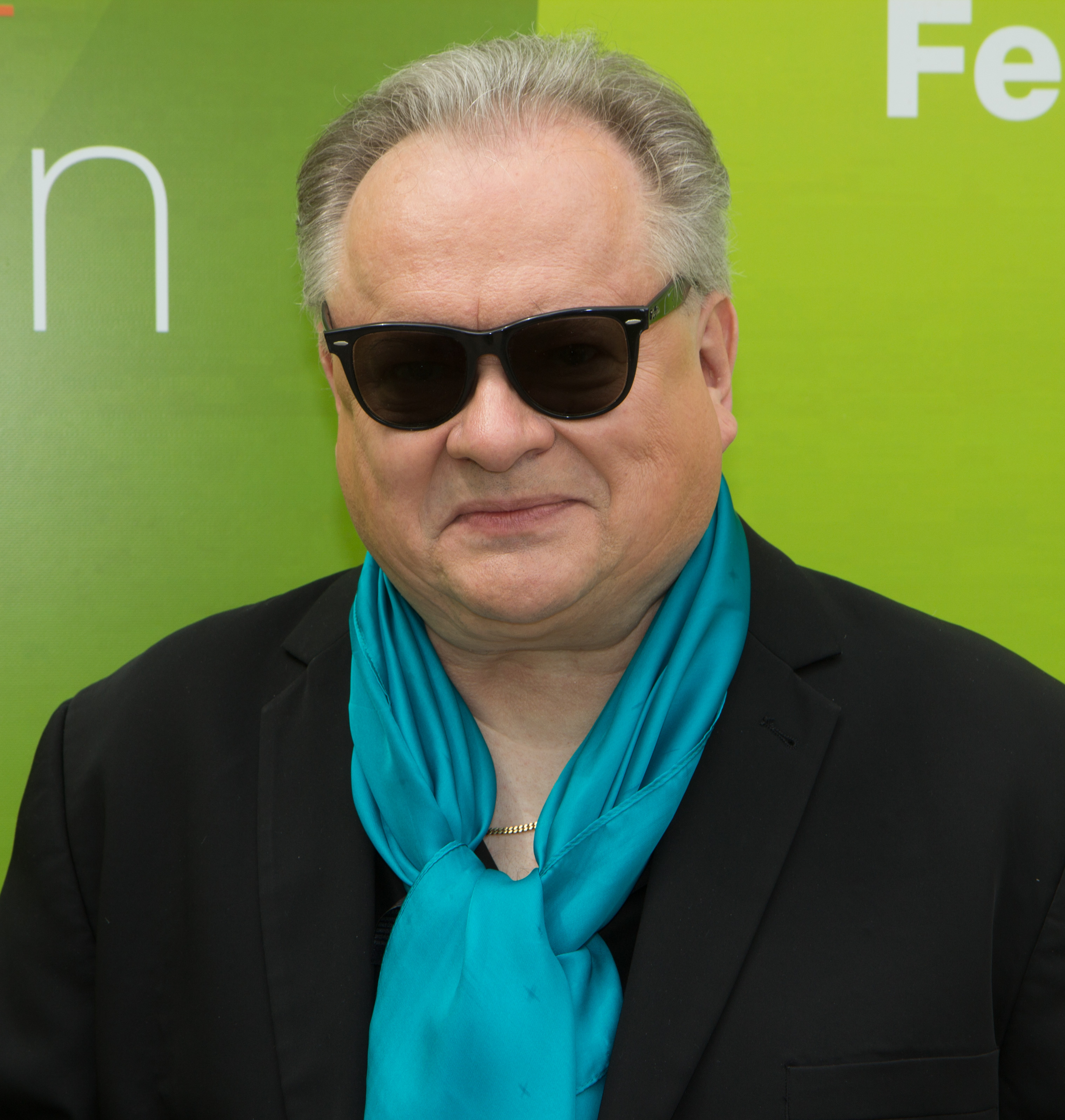
- Heinz Rudolf Kunze, 2018

Background information
- Born: 30 November 1956 (age 69); Espelkamp-Mittwald, North Rhine-Westphalia
- Genres: Rock, Pop
- Occupations: Singer-songwriter; musician; author; translator
- Instruments: Vocals; piano; guitar
- Years active: 1981–present

Heinz Rudolf Erich Arthur Kunze (born 30 November 1956, in Espelkamp-Mittwald, North Rhine-Westphalia) is a German writer and rock singer. His greatest hit was Dein ist mein ganzes Herz (not to be confused with the homonymous song from the operetta Das Land des Lächelns) in 1985.

== Life and career ==
Kunze was born in the refugee camp Espelkamp near Minden. His family had been expelled from Guben (Niederlausitz, now partially Poland). His father, an officer for the Waffen-SS and long-time prisoner of war, had returned only in the same year. In the 1980s, he rose to prominence as a singer. HRK, as he is often called, has also written books, and has translated musicals into German. In 2002, Kunze narrated Piktors Verwandlungen, a 40-minute piece of the German band Anyone's Daughter after a fairy tale by German author Hermann Hesse, during a festival in honoring the late Nobel laureate in his home town Calw. In the national selection for Germany in the Eurovision Song Contest 2007, the singer/songwriter entered with "Die Welt ist Pop" (The World Is Pop), finishing 3rd.

== Work ==
=== Albums and CDs (selected) ===
"D" refers to highest German chart rank

- 1981 – Reine Nervensache
- 1985 – Dein ist mein ganzes Herz (D 8)
- 1986 – Wunderkinder (D 18)
- 1991 – Brille (D 4)
- 1994 – Kunze: Macht Musik (D 10)
- 1999 – Korrekt (D 12)
- 2001 – Halt (D 10)
- 2005 – Das Original (D 28)
- 2007 – Klare Verhältnisse (D 21)
- 2013 – Stein vom Herzen (D 18)
- 2016 – Deutschland (D 8)
- 2016 – Meisterwerke:Verbeugungen (D 37)
- 2018 – Schöne Grüße vom Schicksal (D 16)
- 2020 – Der Wahrheit die Ehre

=== Literature ===
- 1991 – Sternzeichen Sündenbock
- 1994 – Der Golem aus Lemgo
- 2002 – Wasser bis zum Hals steht mir
- 2006 – Kommando Zuversicht

=== Singles (selected) ===
- 1985 – "Dein ist mein ganzes Herz" (D 8)
- 1989 – "Alles was sie will" (D 51)
- 1991 – "Alles gelogen" (D 78)
- 1992 – "Finderlohn" (D 55)
- 1994 – "Leg nicht auf" (D 56)
- 1999 – "Aller Herren Länder" (D 75)
- 2008 – "Langere Tage" (D 93)

=== Musicals ===
- 1987 – Les Misérables (translation into German)
- 1994 – Miss Saigon (German version)
- 1996 – Joseph and the Amazing Technicolor Dreamcoat (German version)
- 1999 – RENT (German version)
- 2003 – Ein Sommernachtstraum (after Shakespeare, HRK and Heiner Lürig)
- 2004 – POE — Pech und Schwefel (HRK and Frank Nimsgern)
- 2007 – Kleider machen Liebe – oder: Was ihr wollt (after Shakespeare, HRK and Heiner Lürig)

=== Books (selected) ===
- 1984 – Deutsche Wertarbeit — Lieder und Texte 1980–1982
- 1986 – Papierkrieg — Lieder und Texte 1983–1985
- 1992 – Mucken und Elefanten — Lieder und Texte 1986–1991
- 1997 – Heimatfront — Lieder und Texte 1995–1997
- 1999 – heinz rudolf kunze: agent provocateur
- 2005 – Artgerechte Haltung — Lieder und Texte 2003–2005

by others

- 2005 – Silbermond samt Stirnenfuß — HRK Texte und Musik von 1980 bis 2005 von Holger Zürch
- 2007 – Heinz Rudolf Kunze — Meine eigenen Wege. Die Biographie von Karl-Heinz Barthelmes
