= EyeQ =

Danish girl group

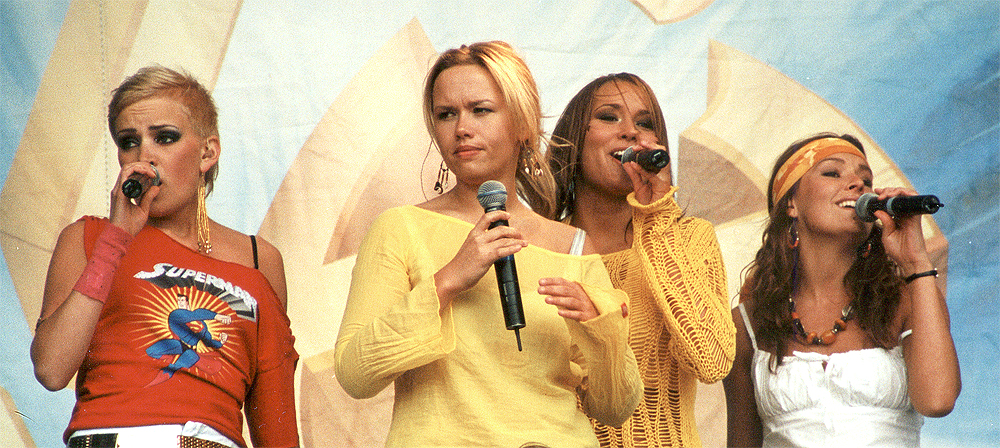
- From left to right: Louise Lolle, Trine Jepsen, Sofie Hviid & Julie Næslund.

Background information
- Origin: Copenhagen, Denmark
- Genres: Pop
- Years active: 2001–2003
- Labels: EMI
- Past members: Trine Jepsen; Louise Lolle; Sofie Hviid; Julie Næslund

EyeQ was a Danish girl group, that formed as the winners of the first season of the reality series Popstars which was broadcast on TV2 in 2001. The group became one of Danmarks best selling music groups. The group consisted of singers Trine Jepsen, the winner of Dansk Melodi Grand Prix 1999 with the song "Denne Gang", Louise Lolle, Sofie Hviid and Julie Næslund.

== Career ==
=== 2001: Early success, first album ===
The media attention the group got from appearing on Popstars gave the group success with their debut single "I Want What She's Got" which topped the Danish single charts. The single was sold in more than 30,000 copies and went triple platinum. Their debut album Let It Spin from 2001 peaked at number one on the Danish album chart and continued to place on the chart for twenty consecutive weeks. The album sold 150,000 copies and got triple platinum.

=== 2002–03: Second album and split ===
The group's second album Be Okay was released in 2002 and in that album the girls themselves wrote several of the songs. The album peaked at number seventeen for one week.

Sofie Hviid left the group in 2003, and the rest of the group disbanded shortly after that.

== Discography ==
- 2001 - Let It Spin
- 2002 - Be Okay
