= Germany in the Eurovision Song Contest 2006 =

- Eurovision Song Contest 2006
- Participating broadcaster: ARD (Note: Arbeitsgemeinschaft der öffentlich-rechtlichen Rundfunkanstalten der Bundesrepublik Deutschland) – Norddeutscher Rundfunk (NDR)
- Country: Germany
- Selection process: Der deutsche Vorentscheid 2006 – 50 Jahre Grand Prix
- Selection date: 9 March 2006

Competing entry
- Song: "No No Never"
- Artist: Texas Lightning
- Songwriters: Jane Comerford

Placement
- Final result: 14th, 36 points

Participation chronology

Germany was represented at the Eurovision Song Contest 2006 with the song "No No Never", written by Jane Comerford, and performed by the band Texas Lightning. The German participating broadcaster on behalf of ARD, Norddeutscher Rundfunk (NDR), organised the national final Der deutsche Vorentscheid 2006 – 50 Jahre Grand Prix in order to select their entry for the contest. The national final took place on 9 March 2006 and featured three competing acts with the winner being selected through public televoting. "No No Never" performed by Texas Lightning was selected as the German entry for Athens after gaining 365,361 of votes.

As a member of the "Big Four", Germany automatically qualified to compete in the final of the Eurovision Song Contest. Performing in position 8, Germany placed fourteenth out of the 24 participating countries with 36 points.

== Background ==
Prior to the 2006 contest, ARD had participated in the Eurovision Song Contest representing Germany forty-nine times since its debut in 1956. It has won the contest on one occasion: in 1982 with the song "Ein bißchen Frieden" performed by Nicole. Germany, to this point, has been noted for having appeared in the contest more than any other country; they have competed in every contest since the first edition in 1956 except for 1996 when it was eliminated in a pre-contest elimination round. In 2005, the German entry "Run & Hide" performed by Gracia placed last out of twenty-four competing songs scoring four points.

As part of its duties as participating broadcaster, ARD organises the selection of its entry in the Eurovision Song Contest and broadcasts the event in the country. Since 1996, ARD had delegated the participation in the contest to its member Norddeutscher Rundfunk (NDR). NDR confirmed that it would participate in the 2006 contest on 22 May 2005. Since 1996, NDR has set up national finals with several artists to choose both the song and performer to compete at Eurovision for Germany. On 29 November 2005, the broadcaster announced that it would organise a multi-artist national final to select the 2006 entry.

== Before Eurovision ==
=== Der deutsche Vorentscheid 2006 – 50 Jahre Grand Prix ===
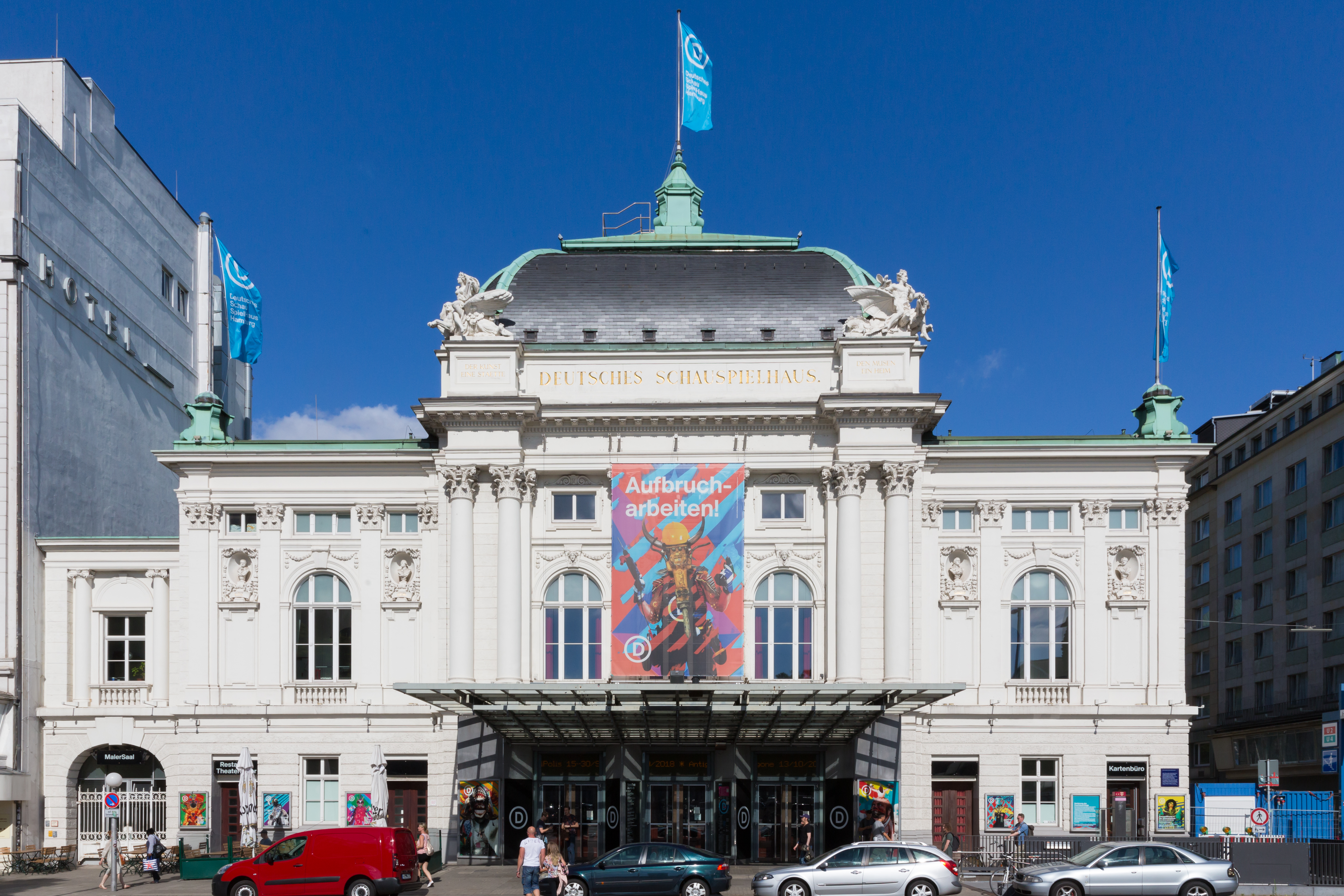
The Deutsches Schauspielhaus in Hamburg was the host venue of Der deutsche Vorentscheid 2006 – 50 Jahre Grand Prix

Der deutsche Vorentscheid 2006 – 50 Jahre Grand Prix (English: The German Preliminary Decision 2006 – 50 Years of the Grand Prix) was the competition organised by NDR to select entry for the Eurovision Song Contest 2006. The competition simultaneously celebrated Germany's 50th Anniversary since their first participation in the Eurovision Song Contest and took place on 9 March 2006 at the Deutsches Schauspielhaus in Hamburg, hosted by Thomas Hermanns. Three acts competed during the show with the winner being selected through a public televote. The show was broadcast on Das Erste as well as online via the broadcaster's Eurovision Song Contest website eurovision.de. The national final was watched by 5.28 million viewers in Germany with a market share of 16%.

==== Competing entries ====
Three acts were selected by a panel consisting of ARD heads of entertainment, which included the head of the talk and entertainment department for NDR and the head of the German delegation for Eurovision Jan Schulte-Kellinghaus. Olli Dittrich, who would participate as a member of the band Texas Lightning, and Vicky Leandros were announced as the first two competing artists on 13 December 2005, and Thomas Anders was announced as the third act on 15 December 2005. Vicky Leandros represented Luxembourg in 1967 and won Eurovision for Luxembourg in 1972.

| Artist | Song | Songwriter(s) |
|---|---|---|
| Texas Lightning | "No No Never" | Jane Comerford |
| Thomas Anders | "Songs That Live Forever" | Achim Brochhausen, Thomas Anders, Lukas Hilbert, Ina Wolf |
| Vicky Leandros | "Don't Break My Heart" | Vicky Leandros, Alex Geringas |

==== Final ====
The televised final took place on 9 March 2006. The winner, "No No Never" performed by Texas Lightning, was selected solely through public televoting, including options for landline and SMS voting. An expert panel consisting of Dirk Bach (actor, comedian, and television presenter), Georg Uecker (actor), Lucy Diakovska (singer), and Joy Fleming (who represented Germany in 1975) also commented on the songs during the show. 794,957 votes were cast in the final: 618,076 via landline and 176,881 via SMS.

In addition to the performances of the competing entries, each of the participating artists performed a former Eurovision Song Contest song, while former German Eurovision entrants Mary Roos (1972), Ingrid Peters (1986), Michelle (2001), Corinna May (2002), and Lou (2003), as well as former winners of the Eurovision Song Contest Brotherhood of Man (for United Kingdom in 1976), Dana International (for Israel in 1998) and the Olsen Brothers (for Denmark in 2000) performed their respective entries.

Final – 9 March 2006
| R/O | Artist | Song (Original artists) | R/O | Song | Televote | Place |
|---|---|---|---|---|---|---|
| 1 | Thomas Anders | "Volare" (Domenico Modugno) | 4 | "Songs That Live Forever" | 216,457 | 2 |
| 2 | Texas Lightning | "Waterloo" (ABBA) | 5 | "No No Never" | 365,361 | 1 |
| 3 | Vicky Leandros | "Après toi" | 6 | "Don't Break My Heart" | 213,139 | 3 |

== At Eurovision ==
According to Eurovision rules, all nations with the exceptions of the host country and the "Big Four" (France, Germany, Spain, and the United Kingdom) are required to qualify for the semi-final in order to compete for the final; the top ten countries from the semi-final progress to the final. As a member of the "Big Four", Germany automatically qualified to compete in the final on 20 May 2006. In addition to their participation in the final, Germany is also required to broadcast and vote in the semi-final. The running order for the final in addition to the semi-final was decided through an allocation draw on 21 March 2006, and Germany was subsequently drawn to perform in position 8 in the final, following the entry from Malta and before the entry from Denmark. At the conclusion of the final, Germany placed fourteenth in the final, scoring 36 points.

In Germany, the two shows were broadcast on Das Erste which featured commentary by Peter Urban, as well as on Deutschlandfunk and NDR 2 which featured commentary by Thomas Mohr. The show was watched by 10.41 million viewers in Germany, which meant a market share of 38.7 percent. NDR appointed Thomas Hermanns as its spokesperson to announce the top three scores awarded by the German televote during the final.

=== Voting ===
Below is a breakdown of points awarded to Germany and awarded by Germany in the semi-final and grand final of the contest, and the breakdown of the voting conducted during the two shows. Germany awarded its 12 points to Finland in the semi-final and to Turkey in the grand final of the contest.

==== Points awarded to Germany ====
Points awarded to Germany (Final)
| Score | Country |
|---|---|
| 12 points | |
| 10 points | |
| 8 points | |
| 7 points | Switzerland |
| 6 points | |
| 5 points | Albania; Spain; United Kingdom |
| 4 points | |
| 3 points | Denmark; Ireland; Latvia; Netherlands |
| 2 points | |
| 1 point | Belgium; Norway |

==== Points awarded by Germany ====
Points awarded by Germany (Semi-final)
| Score | Country |
|---|---|
| 12 points | Finland |
| 10 points | Bosnia and Herzegovina |
| 8 points | Turkey |
| 7 points | Armenia |
| 6 points | Poland |
| 5 points | Russia |
| 4 points | Sweden |
| 3 points | Albania |
| 2 points | Cyprus |
| 1 point | Lithuania |

Points awarded by Germany (Final)
| Score | Country |
|---|---|
| 12 points | Turkey |
| 10 points | Finland |
| 8 points | Greece |
| 7 points | Bosnia and Herzegovina |
| 6 points | Russia |
| 5 points | Romania |
| 4 points | Ireland |
| 3 points | Armenia |
| 2 points | Croatia |
| 1 point | Lithuania |
