= Sidsel Ben Semmane =

Danish musician (born 1988)

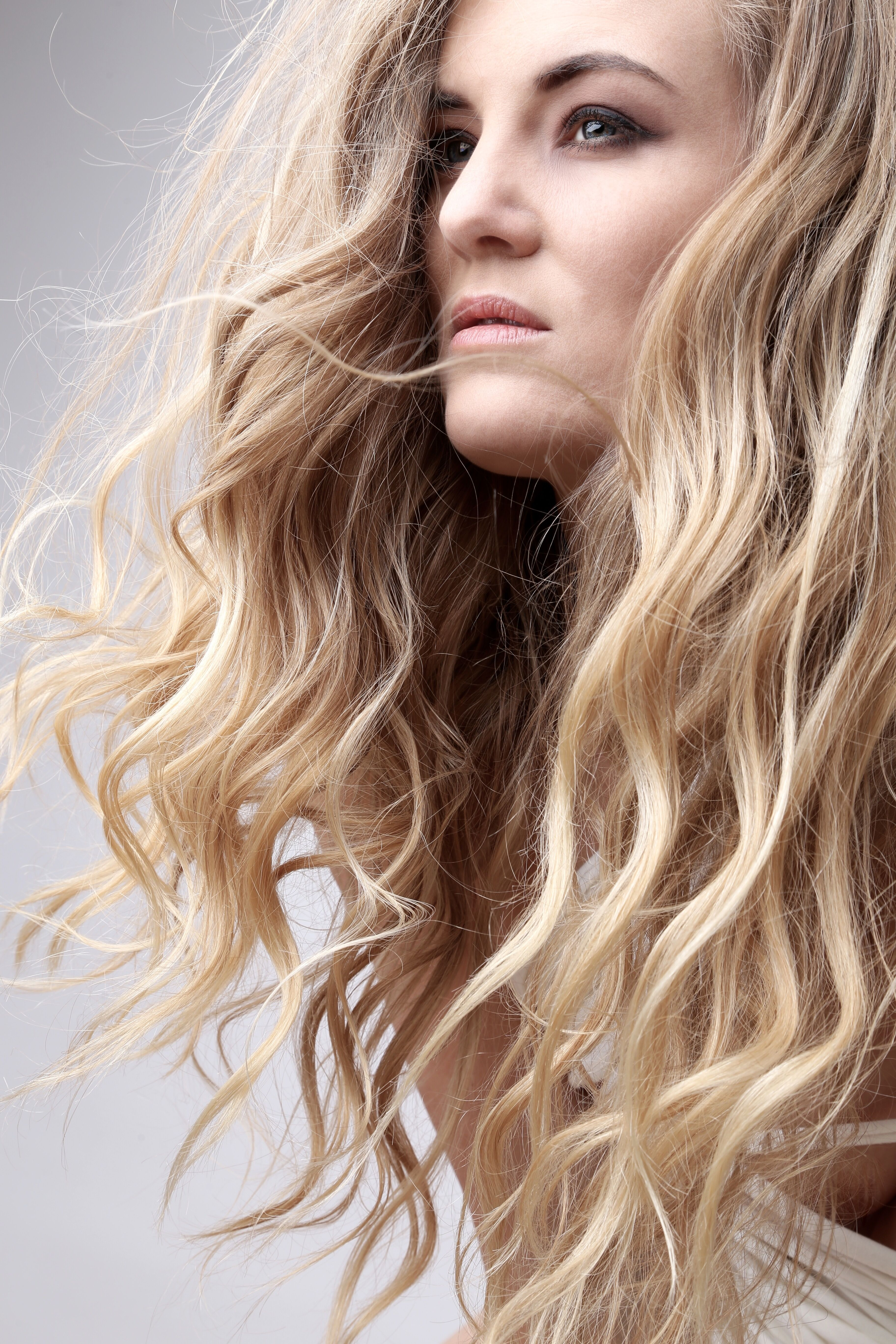
Sémmane in 2017

Sidsel Ben Sémmane (born 9 October 1988 in Aarhus) is a Danish musician known since 2017 by the stage name Sémmane. She won the 2006 Dansk Melodi Grand Prix and went on to finish 18th at the Eurovision Song Contest 2006 in Athens. Her mother is Algerian.

== Career ==
Sémmane represented Denmark in the Eurovision Song Contest in Athens on 20 May 2006. She won the chance to sing on the Dansk Melodi Grand Prix on 11 February 2006 with the song "Twist of Love", written by Niels Drevsholt, which she later went on to sing at the Eurovision Song Contest. At the age of 17, she was the youngest participant to take place in the Danish Melodi Grand Prix. She placed 18th at Eurovision.

On 29 May 2006, Sidsel released her first solo album called Where Are My Shoes?. She performs songs that were hits all over the world in the 1950s and 1960s, including "Do You Love Me (Now That I Can Dance)", other songs, a medley with songs such as "Back In The U.S.S.R", "Locomotion", "Shout", as well as her popular 2006 Eurovision song, "Twist of Love".

Since 2013, she has been performing using the stage name "Miss Lil' Ben."

In 2017, Sidsel Ben Sémmane signed to the German record label, What We Call Records, and released her debut single "Nobody's Prey", under her new artist name Sémmane.

Preceded by Jakob Sveistrup with Talking to You	Denmark in the Eurovision Song Contest; 2006	Succeeded by DQ with Drama Queen
