= Jane Comerford =

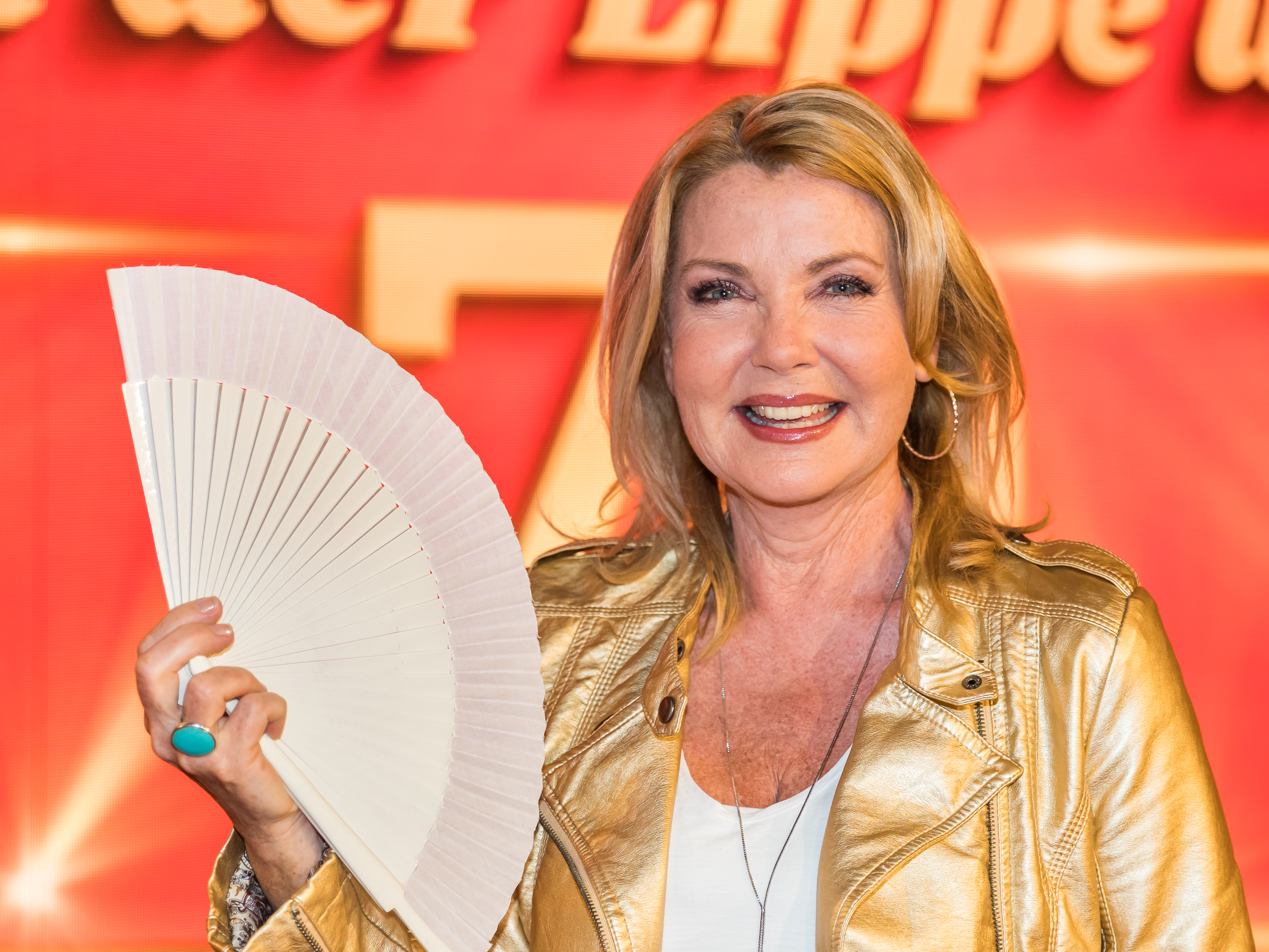
- Jane Comerford, lead singer of Texas Lightning

Background information
- Born: 1 January 1959 (age 67)
- Origin: Newcastle, New South Wales, Australia
- Genres: Pop, country
- Website: JaneComerford.de; TexasLightning.net

Jane Comerford (born 1 January 1959) is an Australian singer, songwriter, lecturer, and vocal coach working in Germany.

== Education ==
Comerford received jazz dance training in Los Angeles. She went on to study singing in Hamburg, Vienna and Amsterdam, and learned to play ukulele.

== Career as singer ==
=== From Australia via America to Europe ===
In 1983 Comerford released a Hi NRG cover version of "In the Year 2525" under the pseudonym "Jane Rossi".

In 1998 she released her debut album Somebody Sent Me an Angel with a collection of her own songs under the Polydor (Universal Music) label. Apart from live performances, Comerford is also an accomplished studio singer, songwriter and producer, running her own recording studio. She also performed for a short while as part of the new line up of the Spanish duo Baccara, who had originally enjoyed success across the world with their hit “Yes Sir, I Can Boogie.”

=== With Texas Lightning to the Eurovision Song Contest ===
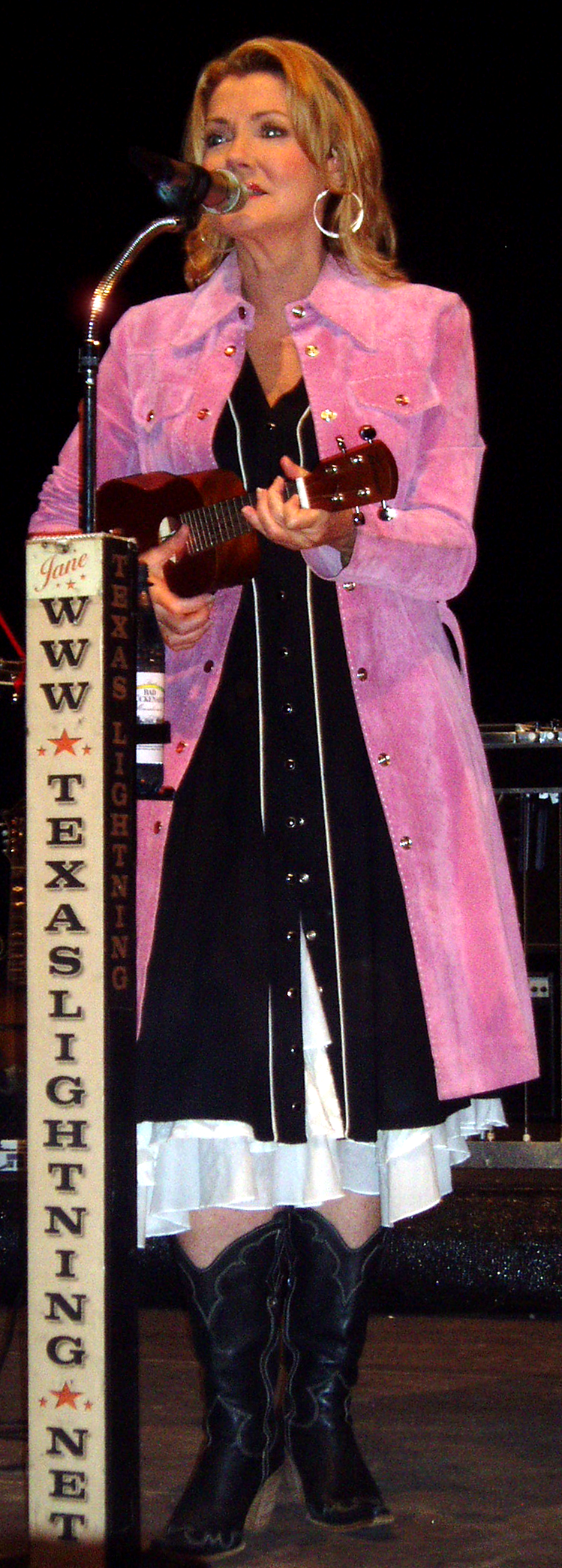
Jane with Texas Lightning.

In 2005, Comerford joined Texas Lightning, a Hamburg-based German country music-inspired band as lead singer. They released the single "Like a Virgin" (cover of Madonna's song), as well as an album called Meanwhile, Back at The Ranch, consisting mainly of country-flavoured covers of popular rock and pop hits.

In 2006, Texas Lightning, along with Vicky Leandros and Thomas Anders, was nominated by the German public broadcaster NDR to enter the Vorentscheid 2006 (German preselection for the Eurovision Song Contest 2006, which actually took place in Hamburg). Their entry was a typical country song "No No Never", written and composed by Comerford. It came as a clear favourite with the viewers during the voting, and consequently Texas Lightning went on to represent Germany in the ESC. As Germany is one of the four biggest contributors to the EBU (organiser of the contest), their entries go straight to the final. On the final night, Texas Lightning came 14th, with 36 points, but the song had already reached No. 1 on the German charts.

== Teaching and coach ==
Since 1984, Comerford has been teaching the Popkurs at the Hochschule für Musik und Theater Hamburg. Within this education program for popular music, she teaches singing, songwriting, performance, and composition. She also provides coaching to artists and bands on an individual basis. Among her former students are Wir sind Helden, Die Happy, Cultured Pearls, Seeed, Rosenstolz, Lemonbabies, Fury in the Slaughterhouse and Cucumber Men. Other personalities she provided coaching for include Yvonne Catterfeld, Blümchen, Eva Herman, Bettina Tietjen, Katja Riemann and Uwe Ochsenknecht.

Comerford also worked as a singing and performance coach for the contestants in the 2003 German version of the TV show Fame Academy on RTL II. This involved daily work with them for three consecutive months.

Since June 2007 Comerford has worked as a judge and coach on the sixth season of the German Popstars show.

== See also ==
- Texas Lightning
- Germany in the Eurovision Song Contest 2006
