= Denmark in the Eurovision Song Contest 2006 =

- Eurovision Song Contest 2006
- Participating broadcaster: Danmarks Radio (DR)
- Country: Denmark
- Selection process: Dansk Melodi Grand Prix 2006
- Selection date: 11 February 2006

Competing entry
- Song: "Twist of Love"
- Artist: Sidsel Ben Semmane
- Songwriters: Niels Drevsholt

Placement
- Final result: 18th, 26 points

Participation chronology

Denmark was represented at the Eurovision Song Contest 2006 with the song "Twist of Love", written by Niels Drevsholt, and performed by Sidsel Ben Semmane. The Danish participating broadcaster, Danmarks Radio (DR), organised the national final Dansk Melodi Grand Prix 2006 in order to select its entry for the contest. Ten songs competed in a televised show where "Twist of Love" performed by Sidsel Ben Semmane was the winner as decided upon through two rounds of public voting.

As one of the ten highest placed finishers in 2005, Denmark automatically qualified to compete in the final of the Eurovision Song Contest. Performing during the show in position 9, Denmark placed eighteenth out of the 24 participating countries with 26 points.

== Background ==
Prior to the 2006 contest, Danmarks Radio (DR) had participated in the Eurovision Song Contest representing Denmark thirty-four times since its first entry in 1957. It had won the contest, to this point, on two occasions: in 1963 with the song "Dansevise" performed by Grethe and Jørgen Ingmann, and in 2000 with the song "Fly on the Wings of Love" performed by Olsen Brothers. In 2005, "Talking to You" performed by Jakob Sveistrup qualified to the final placing ninth.

As part of its duties as participating broadcaster, DR organises the selection of its entry in the Eurovision Song Contest and broadcasts the event in the country. The broadcaster confirmed its intentions to participate at the 2006 contest on 17 June 2005. DR has selected all but one of its Eurovision entries through the national final Dansk Melodi Grand Prix. Along with its participation confirmation, the broadcaster announced that Dansk Melodi Grand Prix 2006 would be organised in order to select its entry for the 2006 contest.

== Before Eurovision ==
=== Dansk Melodi Grand Prix 2006 ===
Dansk Melodi Grand Prix 2006 was the 36th edition of Dansk Melodi Grand Prix, the music competition organised by DR to select its entries for the Eurovision Song Contest. The event was held on 11 February 2006 at the Gigantium in Aalborg, hosted by Adam Duvå Hall and Mads Vangsø, with Græker-Kaj hosting segments from the green room. The show was televised on DR1 as well as streamed online at the official DR website. The national final was watched by 1.651 million viewers in Denmark.

==== Competing entries ====
DR opened a submission period between 17 June 2005 and 10 October 2005 for composers to submit their entries. All composers and lyricists were required to be Danish citizens or have been registered as a Danish resident from 1 July 2005 to 20 May 2006. The broadcaster received 336 entries during the submission period. A selection committee selected ten songs from the entries submitted to the broadcaster, while the artists of the selected entries were chosen by DR in consultation with their composers. DR held a press meet and greet at the DR Byen in Copenhagen on 8 December 2005 where the competing artists and songs were announced and officially presented. Among the artists were Helge Engelbrecht (member of Neighbours) who represented Denmark in 1987 as part of Bandjo, Trine Jepsen who represented Denmark in 1999, and Søren Poppe who represented Denmark in 2001 as part of Rollo and King.

Artist	Song	Songwriter(s)
Christian Bach and Trine Jepsen	"Grib mig"	Carsten Skov, Lonnie Kjer
Claus Hasfeldt	"Ta' hjertet med"	Claus Hasfeldt
Danni Elmo	"2 in 1"	Danni Elmo
David Mader	"Heaven (Ease Your Troubled Mind)"	David Mader
Jørgen Thorup	"Søde gys"	B-Joe Johansen
Kim Schwartz	"Åh amore"	Kim Schwartz
Kristine Blond	"Make This Night Forever"	Mads Haugaard
Neighbours	"Je ne regrette rien"	Helge Engelbrecht, Jørn Hansen, Tommy Rasmussen
Sidsel Ben Semmane	"Twist of Love"	Niels Drevsholt
Søren Poppe and Lene Matthiesen	"En som dig"	Søren Poppe, Andreas Mørck, Jacob Launbjerg

==== Final ====
The final took place on 11 February 2006 where the winner was determined over two rounds of public voting. The running order was determined by DR and announced on 6 January 2006. In the first round of voting the top five advanced to the superfinal. In the superfinal, the winner, "Twist of Love" performed by Sidsel Ben Semmane, was selected. Viewers were able to vote via telephone or SMS and the voting results of each of Denmark's four regions in the superfinal were converted to points which were distributed as follows: 4, 6, 8, 10 and 12 points.

Final – 11 February 2006
R/O	Artist	Song	Result
1	Søren Poppe and Lene Matthiesen	"En som dig"	Advanced
2	David Mader	"Heaven (Ease Your Troubled Mind)"	—N/a
3	Neighbours	"Je ne regrette rien"	Advanced
4	Sidsel Ben Semmane	"Twist of Love"	Advanced
5	Claus Hasfeldt	"Ta' hjertet med"	—N/a
6	Jørgen Thorup	"Søde gys"	—N/a
7	Kim Schwartz	"Åh amore"	Advanced
8	Kristine Blond	"Make This Night Forever"	—N/a
9	Christian Bach and Trine Jepsen	"Grib mig"	—N/a
10	Danni Elmo	"2 in 1"	Advanced

Superfinal – 11 February 2006
R/O	Artist	Song	Televoting Regions				Total	Place
R/O	Artist	Song	Capital Region	Zealand and Islands	Funen	Jutland	Total	Place
1	Søren Poppe and Lene Matthiesen	"En som dig"	10	6	8	6	30	3
2	Neighbours	"Je ne regrette rien"	4	4	4	8	20	5
3	Sidsel Ben Semmane	"Twist of Love"	12	12	12	12	48	1
4	Kim Schwartz	"Åh amore"	6	10	6	4	26	4
5	Danni Elmo	"2 in 1"	8	8	10	10	36	2

== At Eurovision ==
According to Eurovision rules, all nations with the exceptions of the host country, the "Big Four" (France, Germany, Spain, and the United Kingdom) and the ten highest placed finishers in the 2005 contest are required to qualify from the semi-final in order to compete for the final; the top ten countries from the semi-final progress to the final. As one of the ten highest placed finishers in the 2005 contest, Denmark automatically qualified to compete in the final on 20 May 2006. On 21 March 2006, an allocation draw was held which determined the running order and Denmark was set to perform in position 9, following the entry from Germany and before the entry from Russia. Denmark placed eighteenth in the final, scoring 26 points.

The semi-final and final were broadcast on DR1 with commentary by Mads Vangsø and Adam Duvå Hall. DR appointed Jørgen de Mylius as its spokesperson to announce the Danish votes during the final. The final of the contest was watched by a total of 1.7 million viewers in Denmark.

=== Voting ===
Below is a breakdown of points awarded to Denmark and awarded by Denmark in the semi-final and grand final of the contest. The nation awarded its 12 points to Sweden in the semi-final and to Finland in the final of the contest.

==== Points awarded to Denmark ====
Points awarded to Denmark (Final)
Score	Country
12 points	
10 points	
8 points	Iceland; Sweden
7 points	
6 points	Norway
5 points	
4 points	
3 points	Finland
2 points	
1 point	Estonia

==== Points awarded by Denmark ====
Points awarded by Denmark (Semi-final)
Score	Country
12 points	Sweden
10 points	Finland
8 points	Bosnia and Herzegovina
7 points	Iceland
6 points	Turkey
5 points	Ireland
4 points	Lithuania
3 points	Belgium
2 points	Estonia
1 point	Russia

Points awarded by Denmark (Final)
Score	Country
12 points	Finland
10 points	Sweden
8 points	Bosnia and Herzegovina
7 points	Lithuania
6 points	Romania
5 points	Ireland
4 points	United Kingdom
3 points	Germany
2 points	Russia
1 point	Norway
