= Texas Lightning (band) =

German band

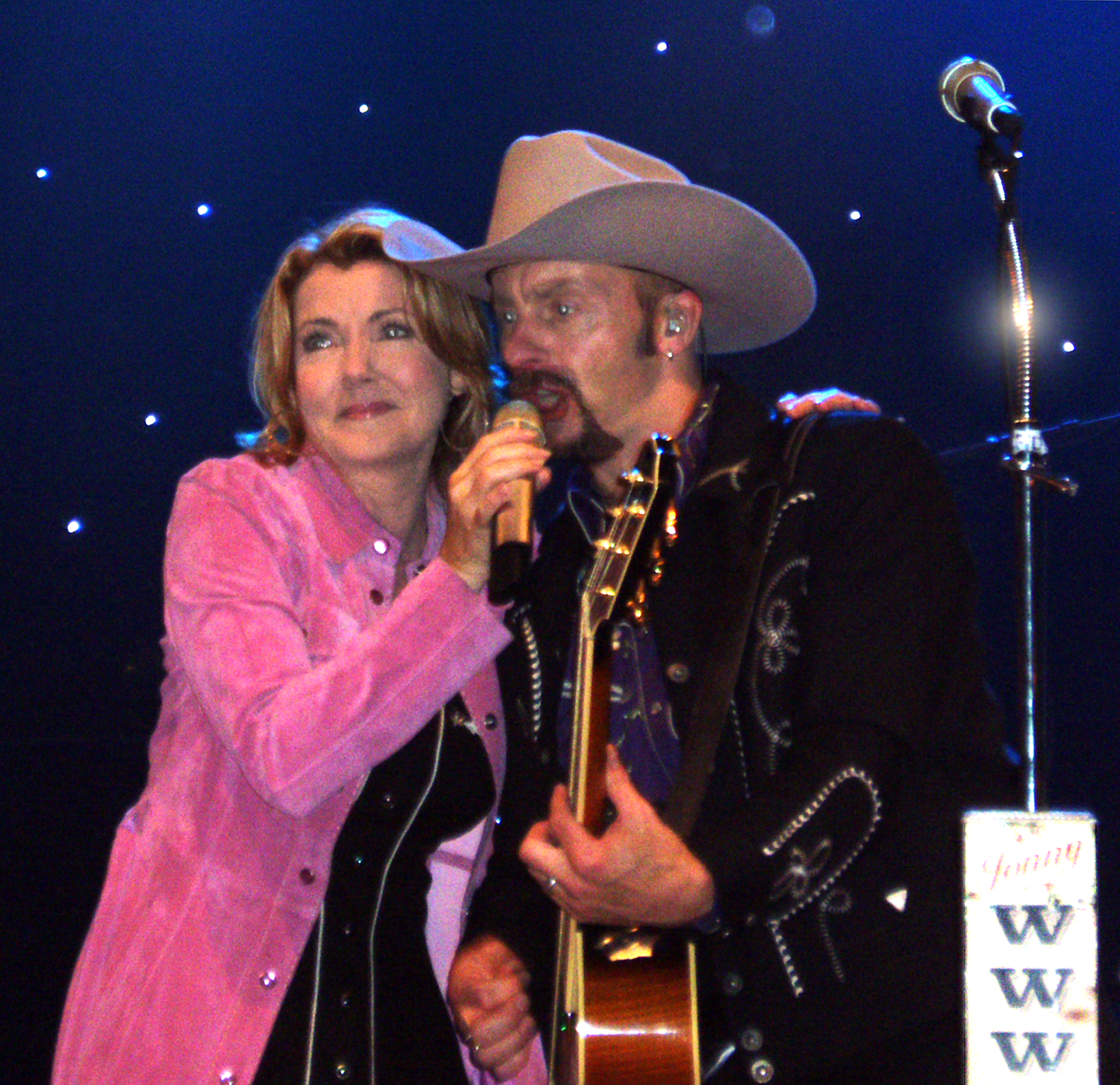
- Jane Comerford and Jon Flemming Olsen

Background information
- Origin: Hamburg, Germany
- Genres: Country pop
- Years active: 2000–present
- Members: Jane Comerford; Malte Pittner; Markus Schmidt; Uwe Frenzel; Olli Dittrich
- Past members: Chris Walther; Little Mick Schulz; Miss Susu Belle; Stefan Hansch; Larry Kils; Jonny Olsen
- Website: http://www.texaslightning.net

Texas Lightning is a German quintet from Hamburg which fits in the country music genre and describes itself as old fashioned and hip. Their music is a mix of country and pop drawing from country classic stars like Patsy Cline, Loretta Lynn, Johnny Cash and Tammy Wynette and pop stars such as ABBA, Nancy Sinatra, Linda Ronstadt, Madonna, Michael Jackson and the Beatles, performed with some country humour. The band members are Olli Dittrich as Ringofire (drums and vocals), Jon Flemming Olsen as The Flame (vocals and guitar), Markus Schmidt as Fastfinger (electric guitar and banjo), Uwe Frenzel as Friendly (doublebass and vocals) and Australian Jane Comerford (vocals and ukulele). The band's first performance took place on 23 December 2000 in the music club "Knust" in Hamburg, as Texas Lightning & The Rodeo Rockets, although there have been various changes in the lineup of the band since.

== Eurovision Song Contest ==
On 8 March 2006 Texas Lightning won the German heat for the Eurovision Song Contest 2006 and represented Germany in the Finals on 20 May 2006 in Athens, Greece. The winning song was "No No Never", written and composed by Jane Comerford. They became the first country band to participate in the ESC. The song finished 14th place with 36 points.

"No No Never" was released as a single in Germany, Austria and Switzerland. It reached number 1 on the German Media Control Charts, number 4 in Austria and number 6 in Switzerland.

== Honorary Texas Citizenship ==
Through a nomination by Steve Sivek of Baytown, Texas and the submittal by Texas State Senator Tommy Williams, the members of Texas Lightning were, by Proclamation 603 before the Texas Senate, declared to be Honorary Texans. The proclamation was passed by the senate in June 2006.

== Discography ==
=== Album ===
- 2006 Meanwhile, Back at the Ranch (Gold Status)
- 2009 Western Bound

=== Singles ===
- 2005 "Like a Virgin"
- 2006 "No No Never" (Platinum Status)
- 2006 "I Promise"
- 2009 "Seven Ways to Heaven"

Preceded by Gracia with Run & Hide	Germany in the Eurovision Song Contest; 2006	Succeeded by Roger Cicero with Frauen regier'n die Welt
