= Eurovision Song Contest 2006 =

International song competition

Coordinates: 37°58′N 23°43′E

- Feel the Rhythm

Dates and venue
- Semi-final: 18 May 2006
- Final: 20 May 2006
- Venue: O.A.C.A. Olympic Indoor Hall; Athens, Greece

Organisation
- Organiser: European Broadcasting Union (EBU)
- Executive supervisor: Svante Stockselius

Production
- Host broadcaster: Hellenic Broadcasting Corporation (ERT)
- Director: Volker Weicker
- Executive producer: Fotini Yannoulatou
- Presenters: Maria Menounos; Sakis Rouvas

Participants
- Number of entries: 37
- Number of finalists: 24
- Debuting countries: Armenia
- Non-returning countries: Austria; Hungary; Serbia and Montenegro
- Participation map: Finalist countries Countries eliminated in the semi-final Countries that did not participate but were allowed to vote Countries that participated in the past but not in 2006

Vote
- Voting system: Each country awarded 12, 10, 8–1 point(s) to their 10 favourite songs
- Winning song: Finland; "Hard Rock Hallelujah"

The Eurovision Song Contest 2006 was the 51st edition of the Eurovision Song Contest. It consisted of a semi-final on 18 May and a final on 20 May 2006, held at the O.A.C.A. Olympic Indoor Hall in Athens, Greece, and presented by Maria Menounos and Sakis Rouvas. It was organised by the European Broadcasting Union (EBU) and host broadcaster the Hellenic Broadcasting Corporation (ERT), who staged the event after winning the 2005 contest for Greece with the song "My Number One" by Helena Paparizou. Rouvas had also represented Greece in 2004.

Broadcasters from thirty-seven countries participated in the contest. Armenia took part for the first time. Meanwhile, Austria, Hungary, and Serbia and Montenegro announced their non-participation in the contest. Serbian-Montenegrin broadcaster Udruženje javnih radija i televizija (UJRT) had intended to participate, but due to a scandal in its national selection, the tensions between its members, Radio Television of Serbia (RTS) and Radio and Television of Montenegro (RTCG), forced its withdrawal. Despite this, they did retain voting rights for the contest.

The winner was Finland with the heavy metal-song "Hard Rock Hallelujah", performed by Lordi and written by lead singer Mr. Lordi. This was Finland's first victory in the contest - and first top five placing - in 45 years of participation, the longest time a country had competed without a win at that point. It was also the first ever hard rock song to win the contest, as well as the first band to win since 1997. Russia, Bosnia and Herzegovina, Romania, and Sweden rounded out the top five. Bosnia and Herzegovina achieved their best result in their Eurovision history. Further down the table, Lithuania also achieved their best result to date, finishing sixth. Of the "Big Four" countries Germany placed the highest, tying for fourteenth with Norway.

The contest saw the thousandth song performed in the contest, when "Every Song Is a Cry for Love" was performed by Brian Kennedy for Ireland in the semi-final.

== Location ==
O.A.C.A. Olympic Indoor Hall – host venue of the 2006 contest

Location of host venue (red) and other contest-related sites and events (blue)

The contest took place in Athens, Greece, following the country's victory at the 2005 edition. It was the first time Greece hosted the contest. The venue that was chosen as the host venue was the O.A.C.A. Olympic Indoor Hall, which is located in the Athens Olympic Sports Complex, in the capital city of Greece. Completed in 1995, it was the largest indoor venue used at the 2004 Summer Olympics when it hosted the gymnastics events and the basketball finals and the 2004 Summer Paralympics when it hosted the wheelchair basketball event.

=== Bidding phase ===
Locations of the candidate cities: the chosen host city is marked in blue, while the eliminated cities are marked in red.

When Greece won the 2005 contest, the Head of the Greek Delegation, Fotini Yiannoulatou, said that the Hellenic Broadcasting Corporation (ERT) was ready to host the event in Athens the next year. However, multiple cities bid to host the 2006 contest, including Thessaloniki and Patras, the second and the third largest city in Greece, respectively. The majors of the three cities (Athens, Thessaloniki, Patras) were said that their cities were ready to host the event. The venues that were rumored for each city were: the Olympic Indoor Hall for Athens, Pylea Sports Hall for Thessaloniki and Dimitris Tofalos Arena for Patras.

A few days after Greece's win, the Greek public broadcaster stated that "ERT intends to hold the Eurovision Song Contest in Athens, taking into account EBU's already expressed wish for the event to be combined with the Olympic facilities and amenities that the city of Athens has to offer". Mr. Panaghiotis Psomiadis, the Prefect of Thessaloniki stated the city will fight for the hosting of the contest. As the city of Patras seemed not to be available to host the contest, at the end it was a two-horse race between Athens and Thessaloniki.

Finally, on 30 June 2005, ERT and European Broadcasting Union (EBU) announced that Athens will be the host city of the 2006 contest, despite the opposition of some Greek politicians, stated that Athens already had its promotion during the 2004 Summer Olympics and that it's "another city's turn now". The joint decision of the EBU and ERT is to host the 51st Eurovision Song Contest in Athens, which has several modern Olympic venues, infrastructure and a proven ability to host events of this size.

=== Other sites ===
The Eurovision Village was the official Eurovision Song Contest fan and sponsors' area during the events week. There, it was possible to watch performances by local artists, as well as the live shows broadcast from the main venue. Located at the Zappeion, it was open from 15 to 21 May 2006.

The EuroClub was the venue for the official after-parties and private performances by contest participants. Unlike the Eurovision Village, access to the EuroClub was restricted to accredited fans, delegates, and press. It was located at Athens Technopolis, an industrial museum and a major cultural venue of the city.

The official "Welcome and Opening Ceremonies" events, where the contestants and their delegations are presented before the accredited press and fans, took place also in Zappeion on 15 May 2006 at 21:00 EET, followed by the Opening Ceremony.

== Participants ==
Eurovision Song Contest 2006 – Participation summaries by country
- Albania; Andorra; Armenia; Belarus; Belgium; Bosnia and Herzegovina; Bulgaria; Croatia; Cyprus; Denmark; Estonia; Finland; France; Germany; Greece; Iceland; Ireland; Israel; Latvia; Lithuania; Macedonia; Malta; Moldova; Monaco; Netherlands; Norway; Poland; Portugal; Romania; Russia; ~~Serbia and Montenegro~~; Slovenia; Spain; Sweden; Switzerland; Turkey; Ukraine; United Kingdom

All participating broadcasters in the Eurovision Song Contest must be active members of the EBU. On 16 January 2006, the EBU announced that the broadcasters from thirty-eight countries would participate in the 2006 contest, with the broadcaster from Austria opting not to participate due to the bad result at the previous contest, and the one from Hungary also withdrawing due to financial reasons. Armenia participated for the very first time in the history of the contest.

On 15 March 2006, the participating broadcaster from Serbia and Montenegro announced its withdrawal, reducing the participants number from 38 to 37 and leaving a vacant spot in the final; however, the country retained its rights to vote in the contest.

Several of the performing artists had previously competed as lead artists representing the same country in past editions: Carola had represented Sweden in 1983 and she won the contest in 1991; Eddie Butler had represented Israel in 1999 as member of Eden; Fabrizio Faniello had represented Malta in 2001; Ich Troje had represented Poland in 2003; Victor Diawara, member of LT United, had represented Lithuania in 2001 as member of Skamp; and Anna Vissi in addition to having represented Greece in 1980 with the Epikouri, had represented Cyprus in 1982. Sigríður Beinteinsdóttir, who had represented Iceland in 1990 as member of Stjórnin, in 1992 as member of Heart 2 Heart, and in 1994, provided backing vocals for Iceland.

Additionally, Hari Mata Hari were selected to represent Bosnia and Herzegovina in 1999, but their entry was disqualified; Ireland's Brian Kennedy performed in Lumen, the interval act of the 1995 contest; host Sakis Rouvas had represented Greece in 2004; and if No Name had been permitted to represent Serbia and Montenegro, they would have done so for the second consecutive year.

Eurovision Song Contest 2006 participants
Country	Broadcaster	Artist	Song	Language	Songwriter(s)
Albania	RTSH	Luiz Ejlli	"Zjarr e ftohtë"	Albanian	Florian Kondi; Klodian Qafoku
Andorra	RTVA	Jenny	"Sense tu"	Catalan	Rafael Artesero; Joan Antoni Rechi
Armenia	AMPTV	André	"Without Your Love"	English	Catherine Bekian; Armen Martirosyan
Belarus	BTRC	Polina Smolova	"Mum"	English	Andrey Kostiugov; Sergey Sukhomlin
Belgium	VRT	Kate Ryan	"Je t'adore"	English	Niklas Bergwall; Lisa Greene; Niclas Kings; Katrien Verbeeck
Bosnia and Herzegovina	BHRT	Hari Mata Hari	"Lejla"	Bosnian	Dejan Ivanović; Željko Joksimović; Fahrudin Pecikoza
Bulgaria	BNT	Mariana Popova	"Let Me Cry"	English	Elina Gavrilova; Dani Milev
Croatia	HRT	Severina	"Moja štikla"	Croatian	Boris Novković; Franjo Valentić; Severina Vučković
Cyprus	CyBC	Annet Artani	"Why Angels Cry"	English	Peter Yiannakis
Denmark	DR	Sidsel Ben Semmane	"Twist of Love"	English	Niels Drevsholt
Estonia	ETV	Sandra	"Through My Window"	English	Jana Hallas; Alar Kotkas; Ilmar Laisaar; Pearu Paulus
Finland	YLE	Lordi	"Hard Rock Hallelujah"	English	Mr Lordi
France	France Télévisions	Virginie Pouchain	"Il était temps"	French	Cornelius Nyungura
Germany	NDR (Note: On behalf of the German public broadcasting consortium ARD)	Texas Lightning	"No No Never"	English	Jane Comerford
Greece	ERT	Anna Vissi	"Everything"	English	Nikos Karvelas; Anna Vissi
Iceland	RÚV	Silvía Night	"Congratulations"	English	Ágústa Eva Erlendsdóttir; Þorvaldur Bjarni Þorvaldsson
Ireland	RTÉ	Brian Kennedy	"Every Song Is a Cry for Love"	English	Brian Kennedy
Israel	IBA	Eddie Butler	"Together We Are One"	Hebrew, English	Orly Burg; Eddie Butler; Osnat Tzavag
Latvia	LTV	Vocal Group Cosmos	"I Hear Your Heart"	English	Molly-Ann Leikin; Guntars Račs; Andris Sējāns; Reinis Sējāns
Lithuania	LRT	LT United	"We Are the Winners"	English	Viktoras Diawara; Andrius Mamontovas; Saulius Urbonavičius
Macedonia	MRT	Elena Risteska	"Ninanajna" (Нинанајна)	English, Macedonian	Darko Dimitrov; Rade Vrčakovski
Malta	PBS	Fabrizio Faniello	"I Do"	English	Fabrizio Faniello; Aldo Spiteri
Moldova	TRM	Arsenium feat. Natalia Gordienko and Connect-R	"Loca"	English	Arsenie Todiraș
Monaco	TMC	Séverine Ferrer	"La Coco-Dance"	French, Tahitian	Iren Bo; J. Woodfeel
Netherlands	NOS	Treble	"Amambanda"	English, Imaginary	Caroline Hoffman; Niña van Dijk; Djem van Dijk
Norway	NRK	Christine Guldbrandsen	"Alvedansen"	Norwegian	Kjetil Fluge; Christine Guldbrandsen; Atle Halstensen
Poland	TVP	Ich Troje (Note: Performance contains uncredited live vocals from O-Jay)	"Follow My Heart"	English, Polish, German, Russian	André Franke; Olaf Jeglitza; William Lennox; Michał Wiśniewski
Portugal	RTP	Nonstop	"Coisas de nada"	Portuguese, English	José Manuel Afonso; Elvis Veiguinha
Romania	TVR	Mihai Trăistariu	"Tornerò"	English, Italian	Eduard Cîrcotã; Mihaela Deac; Cristian Hriscu
Russia	C1R	Dima Bilan	"Never Let You Go"	English	Irina Antonyan; Karen Kavaleryan; Alexandr Lunyov
Slovenia	RTVSLO	Anžej Dežan	"Mr. Nobody"	English	Matjaž Vlašič; Urša Vlašič
Spain	TVE	Las Ketchup	"Bloody Mary"	Spanish	Manuel Ruiz Gómez "Queco"
Sweden	SVT	Carola	"Invincible"	English	Thomas G:son; Carola Häggkvist; Bobby Ljunggren; Henrik Wikström
Switzerland	SRG SSR	six4one	"If We All Give a Little"	English	Bernd Meinunger; Ralph Siegel
Turkey	TRT	Sibel Tüzün	"Süper Star"	Turkish (Note: The song was performed entirely in Turkish in the semi-final, and with an English chorus in the final.)	Sibel Tüzün
Ukraine	NTU	Tina Karol	"Show Me Your Love"	English	Tetiana Hryhorivna Liberman; Mikhail Nekrasov; Pavlo Shylko
United Kingdom	BBC	Daz Sampson	"Teenage Life"	English	John Matthews; Darren Sampson

=== Other countries ===
==== Active EBU members ====
Active EBU member broadcasters in Austria, the Czech Republic, Georgia, and Hungary confirmed non-participation prior to the announcement of the participants list by the EBU. Serbia and Montenegro withdrew from the contest due to a scandal in the selection process, which caused tensions between the Serbian and Montenegrin broadcasters (RTS and RTCG).

== Format ==
=== Visual design ===
The official logo of the contest remained the same from 2004 and 2005 with the country's flag in the heart being changed. The 2006 sub-logo was presented to the public through a press conference that was held on 1 November 2005, at the King George Hotel in Athens, while it was created by the design company Karamela for ERT and was apparently based on the Phaistos Disc which is a popular symbol of ancient Greece. According to ERT, it was "inspired by the wind and the sea, the golden sunlight and the glow of the sand". Following 2004's "Under The Same Sky" and 2005's "Awakening", the slogan for 2006 was "Feel The Rhythm". This theme was also the basis for the postcards in 2006, which emphasized Greece's historical significance as well as being a major modern tourist destination.

In addition to the graphic design, there was a theme song used for the contest composed by Nikko Patrelakis, which was featured in the intros and in-between commercial breaks, as well as besides the participating entries. The theme music package was conducted by Andreas Pylarinos, while the ERT Symphony Orchestra recorded all music used during the show.

=== Broadcasting ===
As with the 2005 edition, the shows were broadcast in widescreen 16:9 format in standard-definition. The shows were also filmed (but not broadcast) in high-definition, as part of a research experiment carried by the EBU, host broadcaster ERT, the Institute for Broadcasting Technology in Munich, the research and development laboratories of RAI and the BBC. This was done to test high-definition television and to gather "artistic and scientific knowledge" for future contests, but the HD footage was never intended to be used as part of the original broadcast. The first edition produced and broadcast in high-definition was the subsequent contest in 2007.

On 31 July 2021, the HDTV raw footage of the 2006 contest was broadcast for the first time, as part of the EurovisionAgain series, on the Eurovision YouTube channel.

=== Stage design ===
ERT announced that the British company Stage One has been appointed to build the set for the contest. Stage One had designed the sets for the Opening and Closing ceremonies of the 2004 Summer Olympics. The broadcaster have announced that the concept will be rich with traditional Greek elements, paying homage to the country's history and culture. The stage for the contest was designed by Greek stage designer Elias Ledakis. He would go on to design the stage for the Junior Eurovision Song Contest 2013 in Kyiv, Ukraine. The stage was a replica of an ancient Greek amphitheatre.

=== Postcards ===
As it was referred, the theme "Feel The Rhythm" was also the basis for the postcards, which emphasized Greece's historical significance as well as being a major modern tourist destination. The postcards filmed between March and April 2006. The host broadcaster ERT spent €3 million on the production of the 37 postcards. Fanis Papathanisiou of ERT said: "An impressive, international tourism campaign is expensive as well. The Eurovision Song Contest is a perfect platform to achieve equal or even better results. That's why it is worth the investment". To decide what to show in the postcards, ERT held surveys in all of the participating countries, asking people what they associate Greece with.

=== Voting segment ===
To save time in the final, the voting time lasted ten minutes and the voting process was changed: points 1–7 were shown immediately on-screen. The spokespersons only announced the countries scoring 8, 10 and 12 points. Despite this being intended to speed up proceedings, there were still problems during voting – EBU imaging over-rode presenter Menounos during a segment in the voting interval and some scoreboards loaded slowly. The Dutch spokesperson Paul de Leeuw also caused problems, giving his mobile number to presenter Rouvas during the Dutch results, and slowing down proceedings, also by announcing the first seven points. Constantinos Christoforou (who represented Cyprus in 1996, in 2002, and in 2005) saluted from "Nicosia, the last divided capital in Europe"; during Cyprus' reading, the telecast displayed Switzerland by mistake. This voting process has been criticized because suspense was lost by reading only three votes instead of ten. And for the first and only time before the Prespa agreement, the display for the Macedonian entry had the title spelled out in its entirety (as "Former Yugoslav Republic of Macedonia") instead of being abbreviated as it has been in previous years (as "FYR Macedonia").

=== Presenters ===
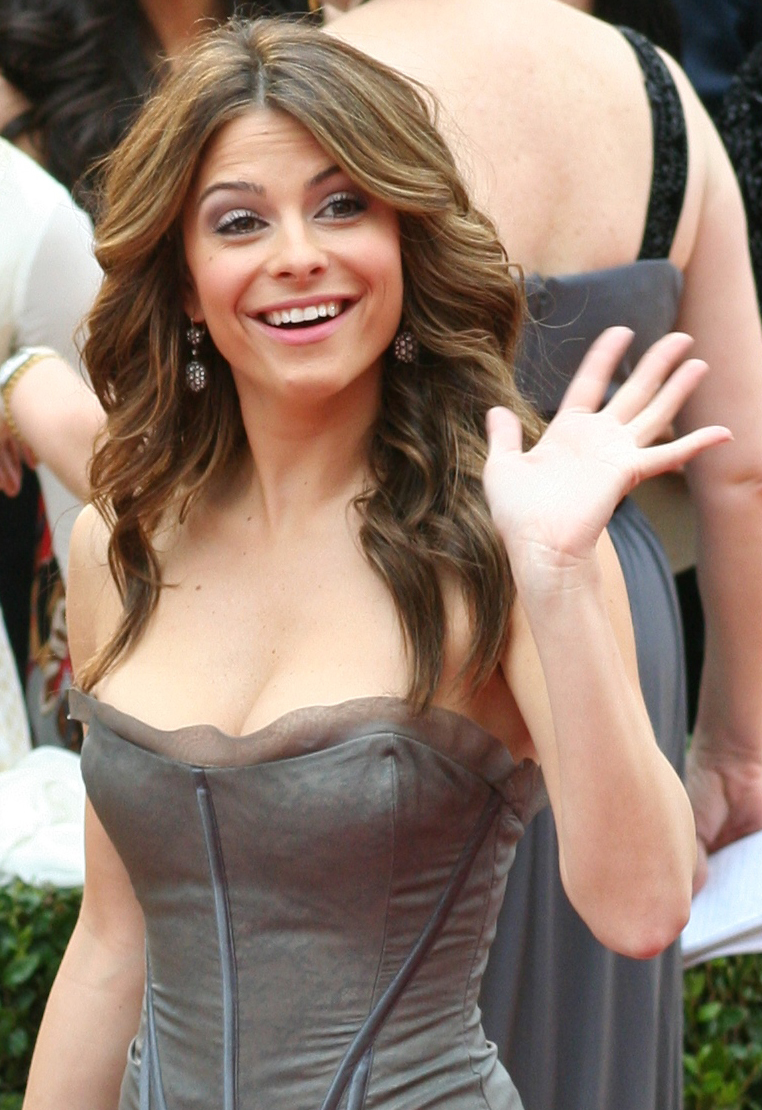
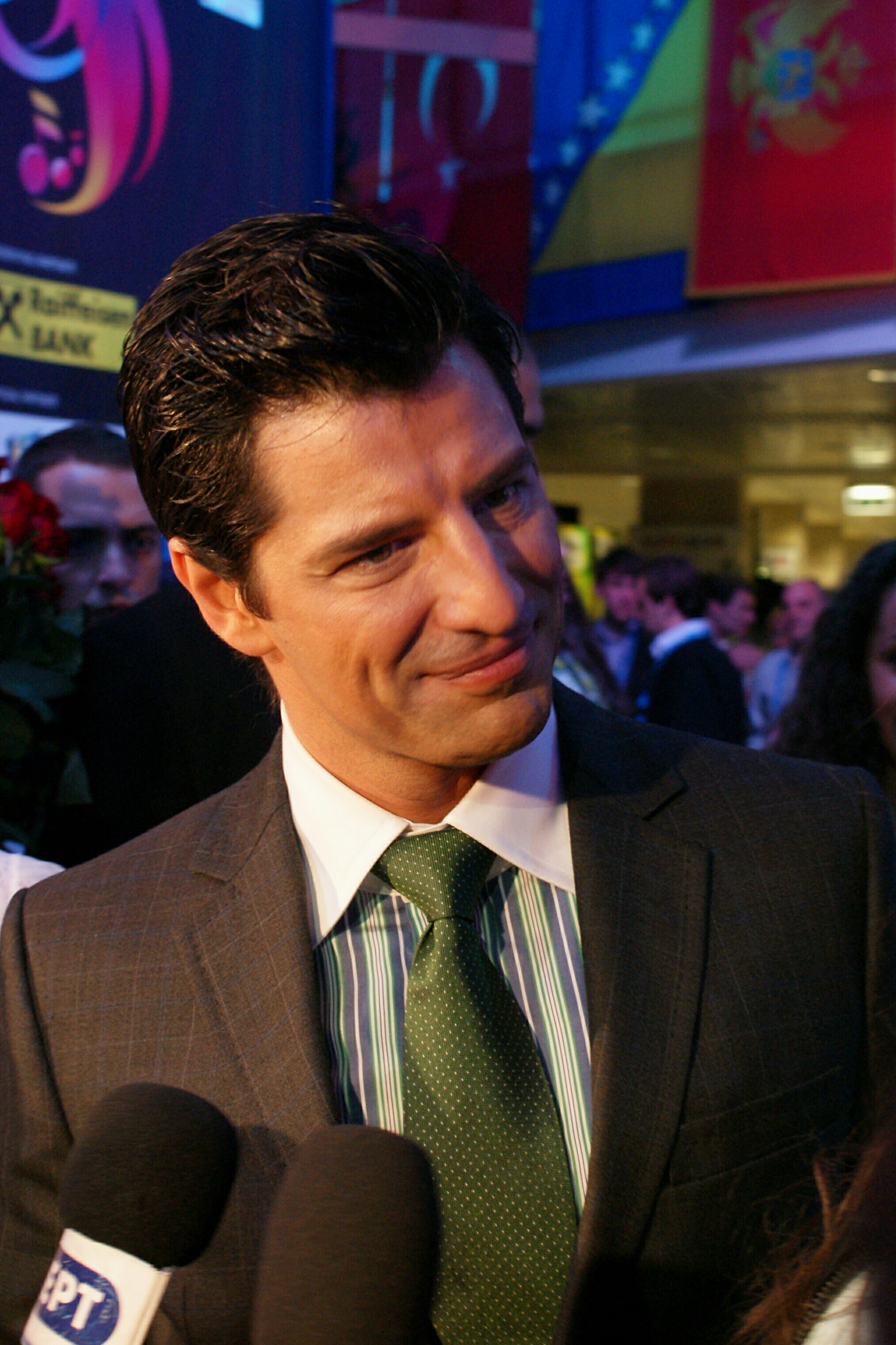
The hosts, Maria Menounos and Sakis Rouvas.

After Greece's win, several websites claimed to know that Alexandra Pascalidou would be co-hosting the 2006 contest, together with the Greek-French journalist and entertainer Nikos Aliagas, but these speculations were untrue.

Initially, ERT asked Sakis Rouvas to represent again Greece in Athens, an offer which he didn't accept. With the Greek broadcaster wanting Rouvas' involvement in the contest, they instead asked him to be one of the hosts of the contest, to which he agreed.

Among the names that were rumored for the female host included Greek Canadian actress Nia Vardalos, Greek social entrepreneur and philanthropist Elizabeth Filippouli, Greek American actress Jennifer Aniston, and the previous edition's winner, Helena Paparizou. After a lot of speculations, ERT announced on 7 March 2006 that Greek American television personality Maria Menounos would be the hostess of the contest.

Menounos and Rouvas also hosted the allocation draw on 21 March 2006, in order to determine the running order for the semi-final, the grand final and – for the first time in the history of the contest – the voting order. The "Welcome to the Party" opening ceremony was hosted by actress Zeta Makrypoulia and actor/screenwriter of the show, Giorgos Kapoutzidis, while Ioanna Papanikolopoulou moderated the press conferences.

== Contest overview ==
=== Semi-final ===
Countries participating in the semi-final The top ten of the 2005 contest, who automatically qualify. The "Big Four" countries, who automatically qualify.

The semi-final was held on 18 May 2006 at 22:00 EEST (21:00 CEST). 23 countries performed and all 37 participants and Serbia (as a part of Serbia and Montenegro) voted. The highlighted countries qualified for the final.

The semi-final opened with a medley of former Eurovision songs performed by Greek gods: "Welcome to the Party" by Anna Vissi (runner-up at the Ellinikós Telikós 2006) performed by the Muses, "Nel blu, dipinto di blu" by Domenico Modugno (Italy 1958) performed by Zeus, "L'amour est bleu" by Vicky Leandros (Luxembourg 1967) performed by Poseidon, "Save Your Kisses for Me" by Brotherhood of Man (United Kingdom 1976) performed by Hermes, "Making Your Mind Up" by Bucks Fizz (United Kingdom 1981) performed by Athena, "A-Ba-Ni-Bi" by Izhar Cohen & The Alphabeta (Israel 1978) performed by Hephaestus, "Dschinghis Khan" by Dschinghis Khan (Germany 1979) performed by Ares, "Diva" by Dana International (Israel 1998) performed by Aphrodite, "Waterloo" by ABBA (Sweden 1974) performed by the Charites, "Wild Dances" by Ruslana (Ukraine 2004) performed by Artemis and "My Number One" by Helena Paparizou (Greece 2005) performed by the ensemble cast of the Greek gods. In addition, the hosts Maria Menounos and Sakis Rouvas sang "Love Shine a Light" by Katrina and the Waves (United Kingdom 1997).

The voting lines for the semi-final were opened by Emilia Tsoulfa (2004 Summer Olympics gold medalist at 470 class sailing representing Greece) and Dimosthenis Tampakos (Greek gymnast and Olympic gold medalist).

The interval act of the semi-final began with the English cover of the song "S'eho Erotefthi", performed as "I'm In Love With You" by the host Sakis Rouvas. A folkloric ballet composed by Dimitris Papadimitriou and choreographed by Fokas Evangelinos followed, using traditional Greek music and dances, with the pan flute as a conducting element.

Qualifiers

Results of the semi-final of the Eurovision Song Contest 2006
R/O	Country	Artist	Song	Points	Place
1	Armenia	André	"Without Your Love"	150	6
2	Bulgaria	Mariana Popova	"Let Me Cry"	36	17
3	Slovenia	Anžej Dežan	"Mr Nobody"	49	16
4	Andorra	Jenny	"Sense tu"	8	23
5	Belarus	Polina Smolova	"Mum"	10	22
6	Albania	Luiz Ejlli	"Zjarr e ftohtë"	58	14
7	Belgium	Kate Ryan	"Je t'adore"	69	12
8	Ireland	Brian Kennedy	"Every Song Is a Cry for Love"	79	9
9	Cyprus	Annet Artani	"Why Angels Cry"	57	15
10	Monaco	Séverine Ferrer	"La Coco-Dance"	14	21
11	Macedonia	Elena Risteska	"Ninanajna"	76	10
12	Poland	Ich Troje	"Follow My Heart"	70	11
13	Russia	Dima Bilan	"Never Let You Go"	217	3
14	Turkey	Sibel Tüzün	"Süper Star"	91	8
15	Ukraine	Tina Karol	"Show Me Your Love"	146	7
16	Finland	Lordi	"Hard Rock Hallelujah"	292	1
17	Netherlands	Treble	"Amambanda"	22	20
18	Lithuania	LT United	"We Are the Winners"	163	5
19	Portugal	Nonstop	"Coisas de nada"	26	19
20	Sweden	Carola	"Invincible"	214	4
21	Estonia	Sandra	"Through My Window"	28	18
22	Bosnia and Herzegovina	Hari Mata Hari	"Lejla"	267	2
23	Iceland	Silvía Night	"Congratulations"	62	13

=== Final ===
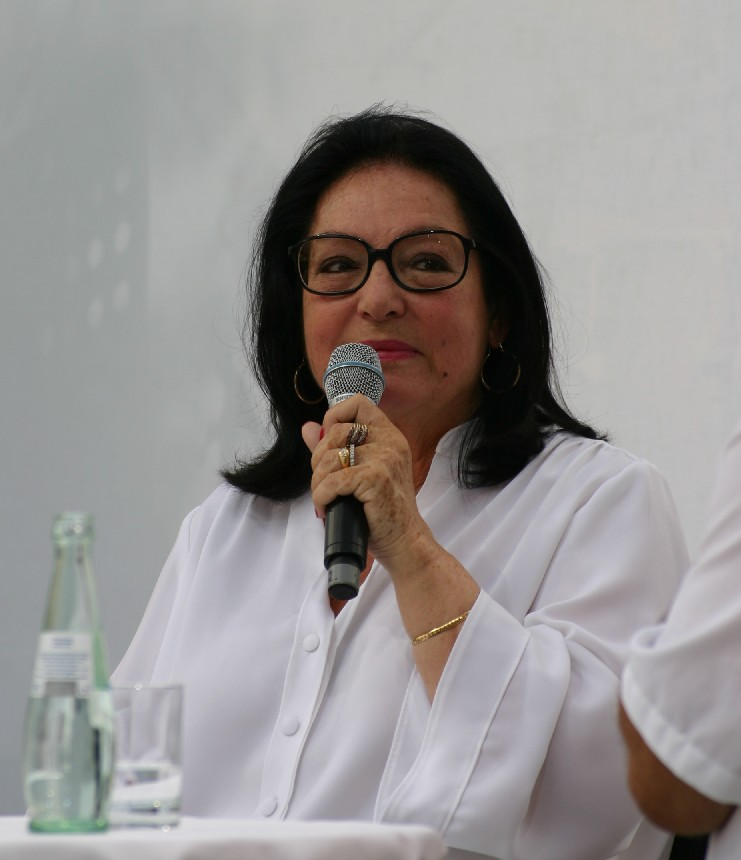
Nana Mouskouri appeared as a guest in the grand final.

The finalists were:

- the four automatic qualifiers France, Germany, Spain, and the United Kingdom;
- the top 10 countries from the 2005 final (other than the automatic qualifiers); (Note: Following Serbia and Montenegro's withdrawal, Croatia took its place as an automatic qualifier.)
- the top 10 countries from the 2006 semi-final.

The final was held on 20 May 2006 at 22:00 EEST (21:00 CEST). and was won by Finland. 24 countries performed and all 37 participants and Serbia (as a part of Serbia and Montenegro) voted.

The grand final opened with a ballet dance, symbolizing the birth of Greece. The Greek singer Foteini Darra performed "The Mermaid Song" (also known as "The Song of Life"), while the dancers and the sets mimicked the creative elements (the sea, the wind, the sun). At the end of the ballet, the presenters appeared in the air, suspended from ropes. They landed on the stage and greeted the audience. They immediately introduced the previous year's winner, Helena Paparizou, who performed her winning song, "My Number One".

The voting lines for the final were opened by the Greek singer Nana Mouskouri, who represented Luxembourg in 1963.

The interval act of the final featured Helena Paparizou performing her song "Mambo!", already a smash hit in Greece, and a contemporary ballet composed by Dimitris Papadimitriou and choreographed by Fokas Evangelinos entitled 4000 Years of Greek Song, which traced the history of the musical culture of the host country.

Finland won with 292 points. Russia came second with 248 points, with Bosnia and Herzegovina, Romania, Sweden, Lithuania, Ukraine, Armenia, Greece and Ireland completing the top ten. Moldova, Spain, France, Israel and Malta occupied the bottom five positions.

Winner

Results of the final of the Eurovision Song Contest 2006
R/O	Country	Artist	Song	Points	Place
1	Switzerland	six4one	"If We All Give a Little"	30	16
2	Moldova	Arsenium feat. Natalia Gordienko and Connect-R	"Loca"	22	20
3	Israel	Eddie Butler	"Together We Are One"	4	23
4	Latvia	Vocal Group Cosmos	"I Hear Your Heart"	30	16
5	Norway	Christine Guldbrandsen	"Alvedansen"	36	14
6	Spain	Las Ketchup	"Bloody Mary"	18	21
7	Malta	Fabrizio Faniello	"I Do"	1	24
8	Germany	Texas Lightning	"No No Never"	36	14
9	Denmark	Sidsel Ben Semmane	"Twist of Love"	26	18
10	Russia	Dima Bilan	"Never Let You Go"	248	2
11	Macedonia	Elena Risteska	"Ninanajna"	56	12
12	Romania	Mihai Trăistariu	"Tornerò"	172	4
13	Bosnia and Herzegovina	Hari Mata Hari	"Lejla"	229	3
14	Lithuania	LT United	"We Are the Winners"	162	6
15	United Kingdom	Daz Sampson	"Teenage Life"	25	19
16	Greece	Anna Vissi	"Everything"	128	9
17	Finland	Lordi	"Hard Rock Hallelujah"	292	1
18	Ukraine	Tina Karol	"Show Me Your Love"	145	7
19	France	Virginie Pouchain	"Il était temps"	5	22
20	Croatia	Severina	"Moja štikla"	56	12
21	Ireland	Brian Kennedy	"Every Song Is a Cry for Love"	93	10
22	Sweden	Carola	"Invincible"	170	5
23	Turkey	Sibel Tüzün	"Süper Star"	91	11
24	Armenia	André	"Without Your Love"	129	8

==== Spokespersons ====
The following people were the spokespersons for their countries. A spokesperson delivers the results of national televoting during the final night, awarding points to the entries on behalf of their country. Although Serbia and Montenegro withdrew from the contest, Serbia retained its voting rights. A draw was held to determine each country's voting order. Countries revealed their votes in the following order:

1. Slovenia – Peter Poles
2. Andorra – Xavi Palma
3. Romania – Andreea Marin Bănică
4. Denmark – Jørgen de Mylius
5. Latvia – Mārtiņš Freimanis
6. Portugal – Cristina Alves
7. Sweden – Jovan Radomir
8. Finland – Nina Tapio
9. Belgium – Yasmine
10. Croatia – Mila Horvat
11. Serbia and Montenegro – Jovana Janković
12. Norway – Ingvild Helljesen
13. Estonia – Evelin Samuel
14. Ireland – Eimear Quinn
15. Malta – Moira Delia
16. Lithuania – Lavija Šurnaitė
17. Cyprus – Constantinos Christoforou
18. Netherlands – Paul de Leeuw
19. Switzerland – Jubaira Bachmann
20. Ukraine – Igor Posypayko
21. Russia – Yana Churikova
22. Poland – Maciej Orłoś
23. United Kingdom – Fearne Cotton
24. Armenia – Gohar Gasparyan
25. France – Sophie Jovillard
26. Belarus – Corrianna
27. Germany – Thomas Hermanns
28. Spain – Sonia Ferrer
29. Moldova – Svetlana Cocoş
30. Bosnia and Herzegovina – Vesna Andree Zaimović
31. Iceland – Ragnhildur Steinunn Jónsdóttir
32. Monaco – Églantine Éméyé
33. Israel – Dana Herman
34. Albania – Leon Menkshi
35. Greece – Alexis Kostalas
36. Bulgaria – Dragomir Simeonov
37. Macedonia – Martin Vučić
38. Turkey – Meltem Ersan Yazgan

== Detailed voting results ==
Televoting was used in all nations except Monaco and Albania. Monaco used a jury as the chances of getting enough votes needed to validate the votes were low. Albania used a jury since there were problems with their televote. In the semi-final, Monaco and Albania also solely used jury voting due to insufficient televoting numbers. Coincidentally, Albania and Monaco were two of the three countries that did not vote for the winning entry, the third one was Armenia.

Serbia had been allowed to vote in the two shows, despite not competing, and despite not being an independent country, but a part of Serbia and Montenegro.

=== Semi-final ===
Detailed voting results of the semi-final
Voting procedure used: 100% televoting 100% jury vote		Total score	Slovenia	Andorra	Romania	Denmark	Latvia	Portugal	Sweden	Finland	Belgium	Croatia	Serbia and Montenegro	Norway	Estonia	Ireland	Malta	Lithuania	Cyprus	Netherlands	Switzerland	Ukraine	Russia	Poland	United Kingdom	Armenia	France	Belarus	Germany	Spain	Moldova	Bosnia and Herzegovina	Iceland	Monaco	Israel	Albania	Greece	Bulgaria	Macedonia	Turkey
Contestants	Armenia	150			2				3		12								12	12	3	7	12	3	3		12	7	7	12	2				10	3	10	8		10
Contestants	Bulgaria	36						1											8								4			5						8	3		6	1
Contestants	Slovenia	49								1		6	7				5					2				2		2				7		3	4	7			3	
Contestants	Andorra	8																												8										
Contestants	Belarus	10																				1	6								3									
Contestants	Albania	58	1						2			7		3							10		2		2	1			3			5					7		12	3
Contestants	Belgium	69	5	7		3		2	5	3					3	5	7	2	1	7				4			3			2			4	6						
Contestants	Ireland	79	3			5	4	4	1	4	3		1	6	6		6	4		3	2		1	2	8						1		2	7	5	1				
Contestants	Cyprus	57			4												4				1	3			7	7		1	2					10		4	12	2		
Contestants	Monaco	14		3											2									1			8													
Contestants	Macedonia	76	8		1							8	10								6					8						10				12		5		8
Contestants	Poland	70					3				1			2		7	1	8		2		10	5		1	3	2	4	6	4	4		3		2		2			
Contestants	Russia	217	4	4	7	1	12	7	7	6	2	3	6	4	10	4	8	12	10	1		12		8		12		12	5		12	4	6		12		5	12	5	4
Contestants	Turkey	91			10	6					8			1						10	8						10		8			12			3	6		1	8	
Contestants	Ukraine	146	2	6	8		6	10		2		2	5		4	3	3	6	6				10	6		10		10		3	10	3	5	2	8		4	3	2	7
Contestants	Finland	292	10	10	5	10	8	8	12		10	10	8	8	12	10	10	10	7	6	5	6	8	12	12		5	8	12	10	5	8	12		7		8	7	7	6
Contestants	Netherlands	22		2							4							1	3							4							1			2				5
Contestants	Lithuania	163	6	5	3	4	10	5	4	8	7	5	3	5	8	12			4	5		5	4	10	10			6	1		6	2	8	4			1	6	4	2
Contestants	Portugal	26		12																	7						7													
Contestants	Sweden	214	7	8	6	12	5	12		10	5	4	4	10	7	8	12	5	2	4	4	4	3	7	6	6		5	4	7	7	6	10	8	6	5		4	1	
Contestants	Estonia	28				2	7		8	5						1																		5						
Contestants	Bosnia and Herzegovina	267	12	1	12	8	2	6	10	12	6	12	12	12	1	6	2	3	5	8	12	8	7	5	4	5	6	3	10	1	8		7	12	1	10	6	10	10	12
Contestants	Iceland	62				7	1	3	6	7		1	2	7	5	2		7							5		1			6		1		1						

==== 12 points ====
Below is a summary of all 12 points in the semi-final:

N.	Contestant	Nation(s) giving 12 points
9	Bosnia and Herzegovina	Croatia, Finland, Monaco, Norway, Romania, Serbia and Montenegro, (Note: Only Serbia was allowed to vote.) Slovenia, Switzerland, Turkey
8	Russia	Armenia, Belarus, Bulgaria, Israel, Latvia, Lithuania, Moldova, Ukraine
6	Armenia	Belgium, Cyprus, France, Netherlands, Russia, Spain
6	Finland	Estonia, Germany, Iceland, Poland, Sweden, United Kingdom
3	Sweden	Denmark, Malta, Portugal
1	Albania	Macedonia
1	Cyprus	Greece
1	Lithuania	Ireland
1	Macedonia	Albania
1	Portugal	Andorra
1	Turkey	Bosnia and Herzegovina

=== Final ===
Detailed voting results of the final
Voting procedure used: 100% televoting 100% jury vote		Total score	Slovenia	Andorra	Romania	Denmark	Latvia	Portugal	Sweden	Finland	Belgium	Croatia	Serbia and Montenegro	Norway	Estonia	Ireland	Malta	Lithuania	Cyprus	Netherlands	Switzerland	Ukraine	Russia	Poland	United Kingdom	Armenia	France	Belarus	Germany	Spain	Moldova	Bosnia and Herzegovina	Iceland	Monaco	Israel	Albania	Greece	Bulgaria	Macedonia	Turkey
Contestants	Switzerland	30						1									12		3													4		6	4					
Contestants	Moldova	22			12			3															3							2							1			1
Contestants	Israel	4																									4													
Contestants	Latvia	30													3	4		8				4	1		2									8						
Contestants	Norway	36				1	6		2	5												3	7			1		1			3		4	1			2			
Contestants	Spain	18		12																																6				
Contestants	Malta	1																																		1				
Contestants	Germany	36				3	3				1			1		3				3	7				5					5						5				
Contestants	Denmark	26							8	3				6	1																		8							
Contestants	Russia	248	4	6	8	2	12	7	7	12	3	7	5	3	10	5	5	12	8	2		12		10	1	12	2	12	6	7	10	6	5		12	4	8	10	8	5
Contestants	Macedonia	56	6									8	8								4					7						8				3		6		6
Contestants	Romania	172	5	3		6	2	10	6	6	2	5	4	4	4	6	10	1	10		1	1	4	3	6	4	7	3	5	12	12	2	2		10	2	7	2	2	3
Contestants	Bosnia and Herzegovina	229	12		7	8		2	10	10	6	12	12	8		2		4	2	8	12	10	6	4		5	6	4	7	1	5		3	12	2	12	6	7	12	12
Contestants	Lithuania	162	3	7		7	10	4	3	8	4	6	3	5	8	12	1		4	6		5	5	8	10			6	1	4	4		10	7	3		4	1	3	
Contestants	United Kingdom	25		2		4	1					1		2	2	8	3		1					1																
Contestants	Greece	128		1	10				4	1	10		6				8	3	12	5	5				7	8	5	2	8		1	1				8		12	7	4
Contestants	Finland	292	8	10	4	12	8	6	12		8	10	7	12	12	10	7	10	5	7	8	7	8	12	12		8	7	10	10	6	7	12		7		12	5	6	7
Contestants	Ukraine	145	2	5	3		5	12	1	2		4	2		5	1	2	7	6	1			10	6		10		10		3	8	5	6	2	6		5	3	5	8
Contestants	France	5																								2								3						
Contestants	Croatia	56	10										10								6								2			12		4					10	2
Contestants	Ireland	93	1	4	2	5	4	5	5	4		2		7	6		4	6		4	3	2		2	8	3	1		4				1	10						
Contestants	Sweden	170	7	8	5	10	7	8		7	5	3	1	10	7	7	6	5			2	6	2	7	4	6	3	5		6	2	3	7	5	5	10			1	
Contestants	Turkey	91			6						7									12	10				3		12		12			10			1	7	3	4	4	
Contestants	Armenia	129			1						12							2	7	10		8	12	5			10	8	3	8	7				8		10	8		10

==== 12 points ====
Below is a summary of all 12 points in the final:

N.	Contestant	Nation(s) giving 12 points
8	Bosnia and Herzegovina	Albania, Croatia, Macedonia, Monaco, Serbia and Montenegro, Slovenia, Switzerland, Turkey
8	Finland	Denmark, Estonia, Greece, Iceland, Norway, Poland, Sweden, United Kingdom
7	Russia	Armenia, Belarus, Finland, Israel, Latvia, Lithuania, Ukraine
3	Turkey	France, Germany, Netherlands
2	Armenia	Belgium, Russia
2	Greece	Bulgaria, Cyprus
2	Romania	Moldova, Spain
1	Croatia	Bosnia and Herzegovina
1	Lithuania	Ireland
1	Moldova	Romania
1	Spain	Andorra
1	Switzerland	Malta
1	Ukraine	Portugal

== Broadcasts ==
All participating broadcasters may choose to have on-site or remote commentators providing an insight about the show to their local audience and, while they must broadcast at least the semi-final they are voting in and the final, most broadcasters air all three shows with different programming plans. Similarly, some non-participating broadcasters may still want to air the contest. The tables below show known data regarding the broadcasts:

Broadcasters and commentators in participating countries
Country	Broadcaster	Channel(s)	Show(s)	Commentator(s)	Ref(s)
Andorra	RTVA	ATV	All shows	Meri Picart and Josep Lluís Trabal	
Belarus	BTRC		All shows	Denis Dudinskiy	
Belgium	VRT	Eén	All shows	André Vermeulen and Bart Peeters	
Belgium	VRT	Radio 2	All shows		
Belgium	RTBF	La Une, RTBF Sat	All shows	Jean-Pierre Hautier	
Bosnia and Herzegovina	BHRT	BHT 1	All shows	Dejan Kukrić	
Croatia	HRT	HRT 2	All shows	Duško Ćurlić	
Denmark	DR	DR1	All shows	Mads Vangsø and Adam Duvå Hall	
Estonia	ETV		All shows	Marko Reikop	
Estonia	ER	Raadio 2	All shows	Mart Juur and Andrus Kivirähk	
Finland	YLE	YLE TV2	All shows	Jaana Pelkonen, Heikki Paasonen and Asko Murtomäki	
Finland	YLE	YLE FST, YLE Radio Vega	All shows	Thomas Lundin	
Finland	YLE	YLE Radio Suomi	All shows	Sanna Kojo	
France	France Télévisions	France 4	Semi-final	Peggy Olmi and Éric Jean-Jean	
France	France Télévisions	France 3	Final	Michel Drucker and Claudy Siar	
Germany	ARD	NDR Fernsehen	Semi-final	Peter Urban	
Germany	ARD	Das Erste	Final	Peter Urban	
Greece	ERT	NET	All shows	Zeta Makripoulia and Giorgos Kapoutzidis	
Greece	ERT	Second Programme	All shows	Maria Kozakou	
Iceland	RÚV	Sjónvarpið	All shows	Sigmar Guðmundsson	
Iceland	RÚV	Rás 1	Semi-final	Sigmar Guðmundsson	
Iceland	RÚV	Rás 2	Final	Sigmar Guðmundsson	
Ireland	RTÉ	RTÉ Two	Semi-final	Marty Whelan	
Ireland	RTÉ	RTÉ One	Final	Marty Whelan	
Latvia	LTV	LTV1	All shows	Kārlis Streips	
Lithuania	LRT		All shows	Darius Užkuraitis	
Macedonia	MRT		All shows	Karolina Petkovska	
Malta	PBS	TVM	All shows		
Monaco	TMC Monte Carlo		All shows	Bernard Montiel and Églantine Éméyé	
Netherlands	NOS	Nederland 2	Semi-final	Cornald Maas	
Netherlands	NOS	Nederland 2	Final	Cornald Maas and Paul de Leeuw	
Netherlands	Radio 2		All shows	Hijlco Span, Ron Stoeltie and Eric van Tijn	
Norway	NRK	NRK1	All shows	Jostein Pedersen	
Norway	NRK	NRK P1	Final		
Poland	TVP	TVP1, TVP Polonia	All shows	Artur Orzech	
Portugal	RTP		All shows	Eládio Clímaco	
Romania	TVR	TVR 1	All shows		
Russia	Channel One (Note: Also broadcast deferred via the Orbita satellite broadcasting system in the Russian Far East)		All shows	Yuriy Aksyuta and Tatiana Godunova	
Slovenia	RTVSLO	SLO 2	Semi-final	Mojca Mavec	
Slovenia	RTVSLO	SLO 1	Final	Mojca Mavec	
Spain	TVE	La 2, TVE Internacional	Semi-final	Beatriz Pécker (Note: The Spanish commentary in the final featured guest appearances from Massiel, Salomé, Karina, Betty Missiego, Azúcar Moreno and Son de Sol.)	
Spain	TVE	La Primera, TVE Internacional	Final	Beatriz Pécker	
Sweden	SVT	SVT1	All shows	Pekka Heino	
Sweden	SR	SR P3	All shows	Carolina Norén	
Switzerland	SRG SSR	SF 2	Semi-final	Sandra Studer	
Switzerland	SRG SSR	SF 1	Final	Sandra Studer	
Switzerland	SRG SSR	TSR 2	Semi-final	Jean-Marc Richard and Alain Morisod	
Switzerland	SRG SSR	TSR 1	Final	Jean-Marc Richard and Alain Morisod	
Switzerland	SRG SSR	TSI 2	Semi-final		
Switzerland	SRG SSR	TSI 1	Final		
Turkey	TRT	TRT 1	All shows	Bülend Özveren	
Ukraine	NTU	Pershyi Natsionalnyi	All shows	Pavlo Shylko	
United Kingdom	BBC	BBC Three	Semi-final	Paddy O'Connell	
United Kingdom	BBC	BBC One, BBC Prime	Final	Sir Terry Wogan	
United Kingdom	BBC	BBC Radio 2	Final	Ken Bruce	

Broadcasters and commentators in non-participating countries
Country	Broadcaster	Channel(s)	Show(s)	Commentator(s)	Ref(s)
Australia	SBS	SBS TV (Note: Deferred broadcast of the semi-final on 19 May at 20:30 (AEST) and the final on 21 May at 19:30 (AEST))	Semi-final	Paddy O'Connell	
Australia	SBS	SBS TV	Final	Terry Wogan	
Austria	ORF	ORF 1	Final	Andi Knoll	
Azerbaijan	İTV				
Czech Republic	ČT	ČT2 (Note: Delayed broadcast in a shortened format on 29 April 2007 at 02:00 (CEST).)	Final	Kateřina Kristelová	
Falkland Islands	BFBS	BFBS 1 (Note: Deferred broadcast at 21:00 (FKT))	Final		
Gibraltar	GBC	GBC TV	Final		
Serbia and Montenegro	RTS	RTS 1	All shows	Duška Vučinić-Lučić	

=== International broadcasts ===
- Australia – Although Australia was not itself eligible to enter, the semi-final and final were broadcast on SBS, and took commentary from the BBC broadcast. As is the case each year, they were not however broadcast live due to the difference in Australian time zones. The final rated an estimated 462,000, and was ranked 21st of the broadcaster's top rating programs for the 2005/06 financial year.
- Azerbaijan – Azerbaijan were willing to enter the contest but since AzTV's application for active EBU membership was denied on 18 June 2007, they missed the contest and had to wait until they were accepted. Another Azerbaijan broadcaster, İctimai, broadcast the contest. It was a passive EBU member, and had broadcast it for the last 2 years. It was the only non-participating broadcaster this year to send its own commentators to the contest.
- Gibraltar – Gibraltar screened only the final on GBC.
- Italy – Italy did not enter because RAI, the national broadcaster, is in strong competition with commercial TV stations and they believed that the Eurovision Song Contest would not be a popular show in Italy. They had not broadcast the contest in recent years, although an independent Italian channel for the gay community had shown it in 2003. Italy eventually rejoined in 2011, and has since enjoyed an upturn in fortunes.
- Serbia and Montenegro – Serbia and Montenegro was originally set to compete in 2006, before withdrawing after being unable to select an entry following a controversy at its national final. Despite this, Serbia's broadcaster RTS retained broadcasting rights, and viewers in Serbia were allowed to vote in both the semi-final and the final.

=== Ratings ===
After the contest, EBU officials stated that the overall ratings for the semi-final were 35% higher than in 2005, and for the Final had risen by 28%.

In France, average market shares reached 30.3%, up by 8% over the 2005 figure. Other countries that showed a rise in average market shares included Germany with 38% (up from 29%), United Kingdom with 37.5% (up from 36%), Spain with 36% (up from 35%), Ireland with 58% (up from 35%) and Sweden, which reached over 80% compared to 57% the year previously.

Voting revenues had also risen from the previous contest, and the official Eurovision website, www.eurovision.tv, reported visits from over 200 countries and over 98 million page views, compared with 85 million in 2005.

== Aftermath ==
ERT's net income from the Eurovision event amounted to €7.28 million, while the cost of the entire event reached €5.5 million, said on Thursday in a press conference the president of ERT, Christos Panagopoulos and the authorized consultant George Chouliaras, who stated: "The allegations about the waste of money of the Greek taxpayer do not apply. The Greek people did not pay a penny for the event. It was a commercial and profitable event and the money we spent was donor money".

According to G. Chouliaras, the revenues that ERT had from the event were €3.63 million from national sponsors, €2.2 million from tickets and €1.45 million from the share of international sponsors, advertising revenues outside sponsorships, sms, etc.

Regarding the costs paid by ERT for the event together with the EBU, it amounted to a total of €9 million, of which €5.5 million were paid by ERT and €3.5 million by the EBU. These costs include the costs for the television production, the production of the artistic program, the technical production, the payment of contributions, the organization of the competition and any other direct costs related to the organization of Eurovision 2006. It is also noted that ERT paid for the production of 47 commercials and their promotion during the semifinals and the final €3.5 million.

=== Spectacles and rewards ===
The president of ERT, Christos Panagopoulos, clarified, however, that the total cost does not include the shows that started in February for the advertising support of the event, for which he estimated that their cost will not exceed €1 million. He stated that in essence the net profit of ERT amounts to €745,000, which will be allocated for other cultural events.

It was also clarified that ERT did not pay anything to Anna Vissi, nor to Nikos Karvelas, as well as did not pay for the dress of Anna Vissi. Chouliaras stressed that all the participants in the event were paid at market prices and in particular Zeta Makrypoulia and Giorgos Kapoutzidis received €8–10,000 per month for their four-month employment, Sakis Rouvas €50,000 and Maria Menounos €45,000.

It was also clarified that the costs of the "promotour" of Anna Vissi are included in the total cost and that from these the transfers were covered by Olympic Airlines and the hotels, the cost of which amounted to €150,000, by the sponsors.

Regarding the future, Giorgos Chouliaras noted that "ERT should have a dynamic participation in the next Eurovision Song Contests and not devalue the institution, since it is a television product watched by 3.5 million Greeks".

== Other awards ==
In addition to the main winner's trophy, the Marcel Bezençon Awards and the Barbara Dex Award were contested during the Eurovision Song Contest 2006.

=== Marcel Bezençon Awards ===
The Marcel Bezençon Awards, organised since 2002 by Sweden's then-Head of Delegation and 1992 representative Christer Björkman, and 1984 winner Richard Herrey, honours songs in the contest's final. The awards are divided into three categories: Artistic Award which was voted by previous winners of the contest, Composer Award, and Press Award.

Category	Country	Song	Artist	Songwriter(s)
Artistic Award	Sweden	"Invincible"	Carola	Thomas G:son; Bobby Ljunggren; Henrik Wikström; Carola Häggkvist
Composer Award	Bosnia and Herzegovina	"Lejla"	Hari Mata Hari	Željko Joksimović; Fahrudin Pecikoza; Dejan Ivanović
Press Award	Finland	"Hard Rock Hallelujah"	Lordi	Mr. Lordi

=== Barbara Dex Award ===
The Barbara Dex Award was a humorous fan award given to the worst dressed artist each year. Named after Belgium's representative who came last in the 1993 contest, wearing her self-designed dress, the award was handed by the fansite House of Eurovision from 1997 to 2016 and by the fansite songfestival.be from 2017 to 2021.

Country	Artist
Portugal	Nonstop

== Official album ==
Cover art of the official album

Eurovision Song Contest: Athens 2006 was the official compilation album of the 2006 contest, put together by the European Broadcasting Union and released by CMC International on 28 April 2006. The album featured all 37 songs that entered in the 2006 contest, including the semi-finalists that failed to qualify into the grand final.

=== Charts ===
Chart (2006)	Peak position
German Compilation Albums (Offizielle Top 100)	2
