= Australia in the Eurovision Song Contest 2022 =

- Eurovision Song Contest 2022
- Participating broadcaster: Special Broadcasting Service (SBS)
- Country: Australia
- Selection process: Eurovision – Australia Decides
- Selection date: 26 February 2022

Competing entry
- Song: "Not the Same"
- Artist: Sheldon Riley
- Songwriters: Sheldon Riley; Cam Nacson; Timi Temple

Placement
- Semi-final result: Qualified (2nd, 243 points)
- Final result: 15th, 125 points

Participation chronology

Australia was represented at the Eurovision Song Contest 2022 with the song "Not the Same", written by Sheldon Riley, Cam Nacson, and Timi Temple, and performed by Sheldon Riley himself. The Australian participating broadcaster, Special Broadcasting Service (SBS), held on 26 February 2022 the national final Eurovision – Australia Decides to select its entry for the contest.

Australia debuted in the Eurovision Song Contest in 2015 by invitation from the European Broadcasting Union (EBU) as a "one-off" special guest to celebrate the 60th anniversary of Eurovision. On 17 November 2015, the EBU announced that SBS had been invited to participate in the 2016 contest and that Australia would once again take part. In 2015, Australia was guaranteed a spot in the final of the contest and was allowed to vote during both semi-finals and the final; however, from the 2016 contest and onwards, Australia would have to qualify to the final from one of two semi-finals and could only vote in the semi-final in which the nation was allocated to compete.

Australia was drawn to compete in the second semi-final of the Eurovision Song Contest which took place on 12 May 2022. Performing during the show in position 8, "Not the Same" was announced among the top 10 entries of the second semi-final and hence qualified to compete in the final. In the final, Australia placed 15th with 125 points. It was later revealed that the country placed 2nd in the semi-final with 243 points.

== Background ==
Special Broadcasting Service (SBS) has broadcast the Eurovision Song Contest since 1983, and the contest has gained a cult following over that time, primarily due to the country's strong political and cultural ties with Europe. Paying tribute to this, the 2014 contest semi-finals included an interval act featuring Australian singer Jessica Mauboy. Australian singers have also participated at Eurovision as representatives of other countries, including Olivia Newton-John (1974, United Kingdom), two-time winner Johnny Logan (1980 and 1987, Ireland), Gina G (1996, United Kingdom), and Jane Comerford as lead singer of Texas Lightning (2006, Germany).

Tying in with the goal of Eurovision – to showcase "the importance of bringing countries together to celebrate diversity, music and culture", the 2015 theme of "Building Bridges", and arguing that they could not hold "the world's biggest party" to celebrate the 60th edition of Eurovision without inviting Australia, the EBU announced on 10 February 2015 that the country would compete at that year's edition as a special guest participant. Along with the "Big 5" (France, Germany, Italy, Spain and the United Kingdom), and the host country of Austria, Australia was given automatic entry into the final to "not reduce the chances" of the semi-final participants. On 17 November 2015, the EBU announced that SBS had been invited to participate in the 2016 contest and that Australia would once again take part, however they would have to qualify for the final from one of two semi-finals and could only vote in the semi-final in which the nation was competing. On 12 February 2019, SBS signed a contract securing Australia's spot at the contest until 2023. In 2021, Australia was represented by Montaigne and the song "Technicolour". The country ended in fourteenth place in the first semi-final with 28 points, therefore failing to qualify for the final for the first time. On 16 June 2021, SBS confirmed Australia's participation in the 2022 contest, with Eurovision – Australia Decides returning to choose the entry.

== Before Eurovision ==
=== Eurovision – Australia Decides 2022 ===
Eurovision – Australia Decides was the national final organised by SBS in order to select the Australian entry for the Eurovision Song Contest 2022. The competition took place at the Convention and Exhibition Centre in Gold Coast on 26 February 2022, hosted by Myf Warhurst and Joel Creasey. Eleven artists and songs competed with the winner being determined by a combination of public and jury voting. The show was broadcast on SBS as well as streamed online at SBS On Demand.

==== Competing entries ====
On 26 August 2021, SBS announced an open submission for interested songwriters to submit their songs online until 26 September 2021. Over half of the composers or songwriters of a song were required to be citizens or permanent residents of Australia and songs were required to be in English or an Aboriginal and Torres Strait Islander language. Ten songs were selected for the competition from the received submissions and performers of the selected songs were determined by SBS in consultation with the songwriters. The chosen competing acts were announced in three sets: the first on 28 October 2021, the second on 26 November 2021, and the third on 14 December 2021. Simultaneous to the final artist reveal, it was announced that an eleventh 'wildcard artist' would be selected through a TikTok contest. Candidates were required to send a live vocal performance clip of any particular song, up to one minute long, with submissions opened until 16 January 2022. Erica Padilla was the selected candidate.

==== Final ====
The final took place on 26 February 2022. The combination of public votes (50%) and a five-member jury (50%) selected the winner. The jury consisted of Alexandra Rotan of Keiino, Darren Hayes of the group Savage Garden, Millie Petriella from APRA AMCOS, Emily Griggs, the SBS Head of Food and Entertainment, and Creative Director and producer Paul Clarke. Moreover, for the first time, the public votes were ranked. According to producer Paul Clarke, the most points an act could get was the same amount that such act could get from the jury. In addition to the performances of the competing entries, the show was opened by Keiino, who represented Norway in the Eurovision Song Contest 2019, and Montaigne, who represented Australia in the Eurovision Song Contest 2021. Montaigne also performed as an interval act together with David Byrne.

Eurovision – Australia Decides – 26 February 2022
R/O	Artist	Song	Songwriter(s)	Jury	Televote	Total	Place
1	G-Nation	"Bite Me"	Erin McKellar; Leea Nanos; Michael Paynter	11	45	56	5
2	Erica Padilla	"To the Bottom"	Erica Padilla; Isabella Padilla; Ally Eley; Sean Carey	20	25	45	9
3	Seann Miley Moore	"My Body"	Ianna Rogers; Imogen Jones; Vanessa Rogers; Sean Carey	18	5	23	11
4	Charley	"I Suck at Being Lonely"	Claire Howell; James Vincent; Thomas Walter Jordan; Jonathan Dreyfus	33	30	63	4
5	Andrew Lambrou	"Electrify"	Andrew Lambrou; Joseph de la Hoyde; Nick de la Hoyde; Tim de la Hoyde	16	35	51	7
6	Sheldon Riley	"Not the Same"	Sheldon Riley; Cam Nacson; Timi Temple	50	50	100	1
7	Paulini	"We Are One"	Rick Price; John Capek	32	20	52	6
8	Jaguar Jonze	"Little Fires"	Deena Lynch; Louis Schoorl; PJ Harding	51	40	91	3
9	Isaiah Firebrace and Evie Irie	"When I'm with You"	Isaiah Firebrace; Evie Irie; Taka Perry	35	10	45	10
10	Voyager	"Dreamer"	Alex Canion; Ashley Doodkorte; Daniel Estrin; Scott Kay; Simone Dow	37	60	97	2
11	Jude York	"I Won't Need to Dream"	Jude York; Billy Stonecipher	32	15	47	8

== At Eurovision ==
According to Eurovision rules, all nations with the exceptions of the host country and the "Big Five" (France, Germany, Italy, Spain and the United Kingdom) are required to qualify from one of two semi-finals in order to compete for the final; the top ten countries from each semi-final progress to the final. The European Broadcasting Union (EBU) split up the competing countries into six different pots based on voting patterns from previous contests, with countries with favourable voting histories put into the same pot. On 25 January 2022, an allocation draw was held which placed each country into one of the two semi-finals, as well as which half of the show they would perform in. Australia has been placed into the second semi-final, to be held on 12 May 2022, and has been scheduled to perform in the first half of the show.

Once all the competing songs for the 2022 contest had been released, the running order for the semi-finals was decided by the shows' producers rather than through another draw, so that similar songs were not placed next to each other. Australia performed in position 8, following the entry from San Marino and before the entry from Cyprus. Later, Australia was voted to continue in the competition in the grand final, being selected to perform in the second half of the show in position 21, following the entry from Sweden and before the entry from the United Kingdom.

In the grand final, Australia finished in position 15 with 125 points.

=== Voting ===
==== Points awarded to Australia ====
Points awarded to Australia (Semi-final 2)
Score	Televote	Jury
12 points		Sweden
10 points		Azerbaijan; Cyprus; Estonia; Finland; Georgia; Israel; Malta; Montenegro; Poland; Romania; San Marino; Spain
8 points		Belgium; Czech Republic
7 points	Azerbaijan; Ireland; Malta; San Marino	
6 points	Finland; Israel	Germany
5 points	Czech Republic; Estonia	Ireland; North Macedonia
4 points	Cyprus; Sweden	
3 points	Belgium; Germany; Montenegro; Romania	United Kingdom
2 points	Georgia; Poland	Serbia
1 point		

Points awarded to Australia (Final)
Score	Televote	Jury
12 points		
10 points		Sweden
8 points		Cyprus; Estonia; Finland; Greece; Spain
7 points		Netherlands
6 points		Malta; Moldova; Poland; Romania; San Marino; United Kingdom
5 points		Germany; Israel; North Macedonia
4 points		Switzerland
3 points		Ukraine
2 points	Azerbaijan	Ireland; Italy; Latvia
1 point		Belgium; Czech Republic

==== Points awarded by Australia ====
Points awarded by Australia (Semi-final 2)
Score	Online voting	Jury
12 points	Serbia	Sweden
10 points	Sweden	Israel
8 points	Ireland	Belgium
7 points	Czech Republic	North Macedonia
6 points	Poland	Ireland
5 points	San Marino	Estonia
4 points	Romania	Serbia
3 points	Estonia	Azerbaijan
2 points	Finland	Czech Republic
1 point	Georgia	Georgia

Points awarded by Australia (Final)
Score	Online voting	Jury
12 points	Ukraine	Spain
10 points	Norway	Sweden
8 points	Serbia	Serbia
7 points	United Kingdom	Ukraine
6 points	Spain	Portugal
5 points	Sweden	Belgium
4 points	Moldova	Czech Republic
3 points	Poland	Italy
2 points	Lithuania	Azerbaijan
1 point	Italy	Estonia

==== Detailed voting results ====
The following members comprised the Australian jury:

- Bridget Hustwaite
- Dylan Thomas Lewis
- Matt Okine
- Milly Petriella
- Montaigne

Detailed voting results from Australia (Semi-final 2)
R/O	Country	Jury							Online voting	
R/O	Country	Juror A	Juror B	Juror C	Juror D	Juror E	Rank	Points	Rank	Points
01	Finland	17	16	6	6	17	12		9	2
02	Israel	2	2	13	1	16	2	10	11	
03	Serbia	3	7	4	11	15	7	4	1	12
04	Azerbaijan	10	9	12	5	3	8	3	16	
05	Georgia	14	10	1	14	13	10	1	10	1
06	Malta	15	5	16	10	14	13		14	
07	San Marino	6	17	11	16	12	15		6	5
08	Australia									
09	Cyprus	16	15	17	17	11	17		12	
10	Ireland	5	13	15	2	4	5	6	3	8
11	North Macedonia	7	1	5	13	5	4	7	13	
12	Estonia	4	11	9	3	6	6	5	8	3
13	Romania	11	14	10	15	10	16		7	4
14	Poland	12	12	7	9	9	11		5	6
15	Montenegro	13	8	14	12	8	14		17	
16	Belgium	9	3	3	7	2	3	8	15	
17	Sweden	1	4	2	4	1	1	12	2	10
18	Czech Republic	8	6	8	8	7	9	2	4	7

Detailed voting results from Australia (Final)
R/O	Country	Jury							Online voting	
R/O	Country	Juror A	Juror B	Juror C	Juror D	Juror E	Rank	Points	Rank	Points
01	Czech Republic	17	11	4	5	10	7	4	18	
02	Romania	16	21	12	6	17	16		17	
03	Portugal	5	7	15	3	11	5	6	16	
04	Finland	19	20	7	19	24	19		15	
05	Switzerland	15	19	16	4	9	12		24	
06	France	20	24	21	18	23	24		13	
07	Norway	9	15	11	17	22	18		2	10
08	Armenia	22	12	18	22	21	21		20	
09	Italy	10	3	24	24	5	8	3	10	1
10	Spain	1	1	1	2	1	1	12	5	6
11	Netherlands	23	22	23	21	12	23		12	
12	Ukraine	7	9	14	1	6	4	7	1	12
13	Germany	18	4	22	7	20	11		22	
14	Lithuania	6	10	9	20	13	14		9	2
15	Azerbaijan	14	6	8	23	4	9	2	23	
16	Belgium	13	5	13	14	3	6	5	21	
17	Greece	24	16	19	12	14	20		11	
18	Iceland	12	13	10	13	19	17		19	
19	Moldova	3	23	17	11	18	13		7	4
20	Sweden	4	2	2	8	2	2	10	6	5
21	Australia									
22	United Kingdom	11	14	6	9	15	15		4	7
23	Poland	21	18	20	16	16	22		8	3
24	Serbia	2	8	3	10	7	3	8	3	8
25	Estonia	8	17	5	15	8	10	1	14	
