= You're a Vision Award =

Annual Eurovision Song Contest award

- Awarded for: "Most remarkable outfit" in the Eurovision Song Contest
- Country: Various participating countries
- Presented by: Songfestival.be
- First award: 2022
- Final award: 2024
- Website: Official website

The You're a Vision Award was a fan-voted accolade awarded annually to the "most remarkable outfit" in the Eurovision Song Contest. The award was created by the Belgian fansite Songfestival.be before the Eurovision Song Contest 2022, after it announced the discontinuation of the Barbara Dex Award created by The House of Eurovision in 1997. This was due to the negative connotation of the award because of its origins of deciding "the worst dressed look" in the contest and a desire to replace it with a more positive accolade.

== History ==
The origins of the You're a Vision Award come from its predecessor, the Barbara Dex Award, which was created by Edwin van Thillo and Rob Paardekam, who also created the Dutch Eurovision fansite The House of Eurovision, in 1997 until its closure in 2016. Malta's representative in 1997, Debbie Scerri, was the award's first ever recipient.

The original award was given to the artist with the "worst dressed outfit", named after Belgian singer Barbara Dex, who represented Belgium in the Eurovision Song Contest 1993, finishing in last place out of 25 countries with 3 points. Her performance became infamous after she wore her own self-made, semi-transparent dress, described as "looking like a lampshade" by William Lee Adams in 2017, head editor of the Eurovision Song Contest blog site Wiwibloggs. Voting for the award was originally decided by an internal vote, before being opened up to the public from 1999.

Shortly after the award was passed over to the website Songfestival.be, its criteria was changed to the "most striking look" before the 2019 contest in an attempt to remove the negative connotation of the award. The Barbara Dex Award was later discontinued altogether after the 2021 contest, with Norwegian representative Tix being the last recipient of the award.

=== Creation of the award ===
On 13 March 2022, Songfestival.be announced that it would be ending the Barbara Dex Award. Instead, the website would organise a new, replacement award for the "most remarkable outfit", that was first used at the 2022 contest. Following an online vote, Songfestival.be announced on 29 April that the new award would be named the "You're a Vision Award" (a word play of "Eurovision"), adding that the new name would serve the purpose of promoting creativity, diversity and positivity in Eurovision onstage fashion.

Australia's entrant in 2022, Sheldon Riley, was the first recipient of the new award. Finnish singer and runner-up Käärijä was announced as the winner of the award in 2023, with Croatian representative and 2024 runner-up Baby Lasagna becoming the third and final recipient of the award to-date.

Following the 2025 contest, Songfestival.be did not make an announcement regarding the award with no vote held during the year, making it the first time since 1996 that the award (including its predecessor) was not given to one of the competing entries. The future of the award remains uncertain, with no updates given as of November 2026.

=== Successors of the award ===
The Eurovision Song Contest created a similar "Style Icon" award during the debut of the Eurovision Awards, published on the Eurovision Instagram in December 2025. The 2025 winner of the Style Icon Award was Erika Vikman of Finland.

== Winners ==
=== By year ===
Table key
2	Second place
3	Third place
Ӿ	Disqualified during the contest

Year	Country	Artist	Song	Place	Runner-up	Third place	Ref(s).
2022	Australia	Sheldon Riley	"Not the Same"	15	Spain	Norway	
2023	Finland	Käärijä	"Cha Cha Cha"	2	Croatia	Belgium	
2024	Croatia	Baby Lasagna	"Rim Tim Tagi Dim"	2	Ireland	Netherlands	

=== By country ===
Wins	Country	Years
1	Australia	2022
1	Finland	2023
1	Croatia	2024

== See also ==
- List of fashion awards
