= Australia in the Eurovision Song Contest 2020 =

- Eurovision Song Contest 2020
- Participating broadcaster: Special Broadcasting Service (SBS)
- Country: Australia
- Selection process: Eurovision – Australia Decides
- Selection date: 8 February 2020

Competing entry
- Song: "Don't Break Me"
- Artist: Montaigne
- Songwriters: Jessica Cerro; Anthony Egizii; David Musumeci

Placement
- Final result: Contest cancelled

Participation chronology

Australia was set to be represented at the Eurovision Song Contest 2020 with the song "Don't Break Me", written by Jessica Cerro, Anthony Egizii, and David Musumeci, and performed by Montaigne. The Australian participating broadcaster, Special Broadcasting Service (SBS), organised the national final Eurovision – Australia Decides in order to select its entry for the contest. Ten artists and songs competed in the national final and the winner was selected by a public and jury vote.

Australia debuted in the Eurovision Song Contest in 2015 by invitation from the European Broadcasting Union (EBU) as a "one-off" special guest to celebrate the 60th anniversary of Eurovision. On 17 November 2015, the EBU announced that SBS had been invited to participate in the 2016 contest and that Australia would once again take part. In 2015, Australia was guaranteed a spot in the final of the contest and was allowed to vote during both semi-finals and the final; however, from the 2016 contest and onwards, Australia would have to qualify to the final from one of two semi-finals and could only vote in the semi-final in which the nation was allocated to compete.

Australia was originally drawn to compete in the first semi-final of the Eurovision Song Contest, which would have taken place on 12 May 2020. However, the contest was cancelled due to the COVID-19 pandemic.

== Background ==
Special Broadcasting Service (SBS) has broadcast the Eurovision Song Contest since 1983, and the contest has gained a cult following over that time, primarily due to the country's strong political and cultural ties with Europe. Paying tribute to this, the 2014 contest semi-finals included an interval act featuring Australian singer Jessica Mauboy. Australian singers have also participated at Eurovision as representatives of other countries, including Olivia Newton-John (United Kingdom 1974), two-time winner Johnny Logan (Ireland 1980 and 1987), Gina G (United Kingdom 1996), and Jane Comerford as lead singer of Texas Lightning (Germany 2006).

Tying in with the goal of Eurovision—to showcase "the importance of bringing countries together to celebrate diversity, music and culture", the 2015 theme of "Building Bridges", and arguing that they could not hold "the world's biggest party" to celebrate the 60th edition of Eurovision without inviting Australia, the EBU announced on 10 February 2015 that the country would compete at that year's edition as a special guest participant. Along with the "Big Five" (France, Germany, Italy, Spain and the United Kingdom), and the host country of Austria, Australia was given automatic entry into the final to "not reduce the chances" of the semi-final participants. On 17 November 2015, the EBU announced that SBS had been invited to participate in the 2016 contest and that Australia would once again take part, however they would have to qualify for the final from one of two semi-finals and could only vote in the semi-final in which the nation was competing. On 29 May 2019, SBS confirmed Australia's participation in the 2020 Eurovision Song Contest after securing an invitation for the sixth year in a row. In 2019, Australia was represented by Kate Miller-Heidke and the song "Zero Gravity". The country ended in ninth place in the grand final with 284 points. On 29 August 2019, SBS announced that they would once hold a national final to select the Australian entry for the Eurovision Song Contest 2020.

== Before Eurovision ==
=== Eurovision – Australia Decides ===
Eurovision – Australia Decides was the national final in order to select the Australian entry for the Eurovision Song Contest 2020. The competition took place at the Convention and Exhibition Centre in Gold Coast on 8 February 2020, hosted by Myf Warhurst and Joel Creasey. Ten artists and songs competed with the winner being determined by a combination of public and jury voting. The show was broadcast on SBS as well as streamed online at SBS On Demand. The national final was watched by 334,000 viewers in Australia.

==== Competing entries ====
On 29 August 2019, SBS announced an open submission for interested songwriters to submit their songs online until 30 September 2019. Songwriters were required to be citizens or permanent residents of Australia and songs were required to be in English or an Aboriginal and Torres Strait Islander language. Minor collaborations with foreign songwriters were permitted as long as the majority of the composers/songwriters were Australian citizens or permanent residents. Ten songs were selected for the competition from the received submissions and performers of the selected songs were determined by SBS in consultation with the songwriters. The ten competing acts were announced in three sets between 8 November and 16 December 2019.

==== Final ====
The final took place on 8 February 2020. The combination of public votes (50%) and a five-member jury (50%) selected "Don't Break Me" performed by Montaigne as the winner. The jury consisted of Josh Martin (Head of the Australian Eurovision Delegation), Kate Miller-Heidke (who represented Australia in 2019), Måns Zelmerlöw (Eurovision winner for Sweden in 2015), Milly Petriella (Director of Member Relations of APRA) and Paul Clarke (Director of Blink TV and Creative Director of Eurovision – Australia Decides) who each distributed points from 1–8, 10 and 12 during the preview show on 7 February 2020 and had a total of 290 points to award. Viewers were able to vote via SMS and the total votes were divided by 290 to determine the quota that would equal to a single point. The number of votes each song gained was then divided by the quota and rounded up to the nearest integer to determine the points an entry would be awarded. In addition to the performances of the ten competing entries, Dami Im, who represented Australia in 2016, Kate Miller-Heidke and Måns Zelmerlöw performed as the interval acts.

Eurovision – Australia Decides – 8 February 2020
R/O	Artist	Song	Songwriter(s)	Jury	Televote	Total	Place
1	Iota	"Life"	Jesse Watt	19	13	32	9
2	Jordan-Ravi	"Pushing Stars"	Mattias Lindblom, Tania Doko, George Sheppard, Martin Eriksson	11	12	23	10
3	Jaguar Jonze	"Rabbit Hole"	Deena Lynch, Aidan Hogg	18	28	46	6
4	Jack Vidgen	"I Am King I Am Queen"	Jack Vidgen, Andrew Lowden	19	15	34	8
5	Vanessa Amorosi	"Lessons of Love"	Vanessa Amorosi, Aleena Gibson, Trevor Muzzy	42	40	82	3
6	Diana Rouvas	"Can We Make Heaven"	Diana Rouvas, Louis Schoorl	24	18	42	7
7	Mitch Tambo	"Together"	Roberto De Sa, Isabella Kearney-Nurse, Andy Hopkins	24	33	57	5
8	Casey Donovan	"Proud"	Justine Eltakchi	40	60	100	2
9	Montaigne	"Don't Break Me"	Jessica Cerro, Anthony Egizii, David Musumeci	54	53	107	1
10	Didirri	"Raw Stuff"	Didirri Peters, Oscar Dawson	39	24	63	4

== At Eurovision ==
According to Eurovision rules, all nations with the exceptions of the host country and the "Big Five" (France, Germany, Italy, Spain and the United Kingdom) are required to qualify from one of two semi-finals in order to compete for the final; the top ten countries from each semi-final progress to the final. The European Broadcasting Union (EBU) split up the competing countries into six different pots based on voting patterns from previous contests, with countries with favourable voting histories put into the same pot. On 28 January 2020, a special allocation draw was held which placed each country into one of the two semi-finals, as well as which half of the show they would perform in. Australia was placed into the first semi-final, to be held on 12 May 2020, and was scheduled to perform in the first half of the show. However, due to the COVID-19 pandemic, the contest was cancelled.
