= Barbara Dex Award =

Former annual Eurovision Song Contest award

- Awarded for: "Most striking look" in the Eurovision Song Contest
- Country: Various participating countries
- Presented by: The House of Eurovision (1997–2016); Songfestival.be (2017–2021)
- First award: 1997
- Final award: 2021
- Website: Official website
- Related: You're a Vision Award (successor; 2022-2024)

The Barbara Dex Award was a fan-voted accolade awarded annually to the worst-dressed contestant in the Eurovision Song Contest. The award was created by the fansite The House of Eurovision in 1997, which hosted it until the site's closure in 2016. Songfestival.be presented the award from 2017 onwards, changing its criterion to the "most striking look" in 2019. Ahead of the Eurovision Song Contest 2022, the award was succeeded by the You're a Vision Award, which was intended to carry a more positive connotation.

== History ==
Map of Barbara Dex Award recipients

The Barbara Dex Award created by Edwin van Thillo and Rob Paardekam, the founders of the Dutch Eurovision fansite The House of Eurovision, in 1997. It was named after Belgian singer Barbara Dex, who represented Belgium in the Eurovision Song Contest 1993 wearing a self-made, semi-transparent dress, which William Lee Adams of Wiwibloggs described her "looking like a lampshade". The Barbara Dex Award was initially awarded to the worst-dressed contestants. Malta's Eurovision Song Contest 1997 entrant, Debbie Scerri, was the first recipient. After two years of deciding the recipient internally, The House of Eurovision opened the award to public voting in 1999.

The House of Eurovision shut down after the Eurovision Song Contest 2016 and handed the Barbara Dex Award to the Belgian website Songfestival.be and its founder, Jasper van Biesen. Van Biesen hoped that this transition would broaden the award's reach. Starting with the Eurovision Song Contest 2019, the award criterion was changed to the "most notable outfit", refined to "most striking look" for the 2021 contest. Songfestival.be noted that "this prize for the most striking outfit does not intend to say what is ugly and what is not and does not want to place the Song Contest in a bad light".

On 13 March 2022, Songfestival.be announced that it would be ending the Barbara Dex Award, citing the negative connotation associated with it. Instead, the website would organise a new, replacement award for the "most notable outfit". Following an online vote, Songfestival.be announced on 29 April that the new award would be named the "You're a Vision Award", adding that the new name would serve the purpose of promoting creativity, diversity and positivity in Eurovision onstage fashion. Australia's Eurovision Song Contest 2022 entrant, Sheldon Riley, was the first recipient of the new award.

== Reception ==
In a January 2006 interview with ESCToday, Dex stated that there was "nothing wrong" with the Barbara Dex Award. A 2015 poll by Wiwibloggs found Guildo Horn, Germany's 1998 Eurovision act, to be considered the worst-dressed of the previous award recipients.

== Award winners ==
=== Overview ===
Table key
2	Second place
3	Third place
◁	Last place

House of Eurovision

Year	Country	Artist	Song	Place	Refs.
1997	Malta	Debbie Scerri	"Let Me Fly"	9	
1998	Germany	Guildo Horn	"Guido hat euch lieb!"	7	
1999	Spain	Lydia	"No quiero escuchar"	23 ◁	
2000	Belgium	Nathalie Sorce	"Envie de vivre"	24 ◁	
2001	Poland	Piasek	"2 Long"	20	
2002	Greece	Michalis Rakintzis	"S.A.G.A.P.O."	17	
2003	Russia	t.A.T.u.	"Ne ver', ne boysia"	3	
2004	Romania	Sanda Ladoși	"I Admit"	18	
2005	Macedonia	Martin Vučić	"Make My Day"	17	
2006	Portugal	Nonstop	"Coisas de nada"	19 SF	
2007	Ukraine	Verka Serduchka	"Dancing Lasha Tumbai"	2	
2008	Andorra	Gisela	"Casanova"	15 SF	
2009	Hungary	Zoli Ádok	"Dance with Me"	15 SF	
2010	Serbia	Milan Stanković	"Ovo je Balkan"	13	
2011	Georgia	Eldrine	"One More Day"	9	
2012	Albania	Rona Nishliu	"Suus"	5	
2013	Serbia	Moje 3	"Ljubav je svuda"	11 SF	
2014	Lithuania	Vilija Matačiūnaitė	"Attention"	11 SF	
2015	Netherlands	Trijntje Oosterhuis	"Walk Along"	14 SF	
2016	Croatia	Nina Kraljić	"Lighthouse"	23	

Songfestival.be

Year	Country	Artist	Song	Place	Runner-up	Third place	Refs.
2017	Montenegro	Slavko Kalezić	"Space"	16 SF	Latvia	Czech Republic	
2018	Macedonia	Eye Cue	"Lost and Found"	18 SF	Australia	Belgium	
2019	Portugal	Conan Osíris	"Telemóveis"	15 SF	Cyprus	Belarus	
2021	Norway	Tix	"Fallen Angel"	18	Romania	Croatia	

=== By country ===
Wins	Country	Years
2	North Macedonia	2005; 2018
2	Portugal	2006; 2019
2	Serbia	2010; 2013
1	Albania	2012
1	Andorra	2008
1	Belgium	2000
1	Croatia	2016
1	Georgia	2011
1	Germany	1998
1	Greece	2002
1	Hungary	2009
1	Lithuania	2014
1	Malta	1997
1	Montenegro	2017
1	Netherlands	2015
1	Norway	2021
1	Poland	2001
1	Romania	2004
1	Russia	2003
1	Spain	1999
1	Ukraine	2007

== See also ==
- List of fashion awards
