= Justine Eltakchi =

Australian singer songwriter

- Genres: Pop; folk
- Occupation: Singer
- Instrument: Vocals
- Years active: 2010–present

Justine Eltakchi is an Australian singer and songwriter based in Sydney. Eltakchi has congenital stationary night blindness and congenital nystagmus, and is an APRA and AMCOS ambassador and advocates for disability awareness in the Australian music industry. Eltakchi also releases music under the alias Zemi Gold.

Eltakchi released her debut studio album Big Dream Baby in April 2026.

== Early life ==
Eltakchi grew up in a musical family in the Blue Mountains (New South Wales). She names John Mayer for inspiring her love for singing and songwriting and her biggest musical inspiration.

== Career ==
Eltakchi released her debut single "Autumn Love" in 2010.

Eltakchi wrote "Proud" for Casey Donovan, which placed second in 2020's Eurovision – Australia Decides, the final to select the song to represent Australia in the Eurovision Song Contest 2020.

Eltakchi co-wrote "We're Not Running" along with Aidan O'Connor for Aistė Pilvelytė, which attempted to represent Lithuania in the Eurovision Song Contest 2023 but did not make it to the final.

In October 2025, announced her debut studio album Big Dream Baby.

== Discography ==
=== Studio albums ===
| Title | Details | Peak chart positions |
| Title | Details | AUS |
|---|---|---|
| Big Dream Baby | Released: 24 April 2026; Label: Justine Eltakchi (GYR0006322); Formats: CD, digital download | 59 |

=== Extended plays ===
List of EPs, with selected details
| Title | Details |
|---|---|
| Exposed Vol 1 | Released: November 2020; Format: digital download; Label: Gatcombe |
| Exposed Vol 2 | Released: January 2021; Format: digital download; Label: Gatcombe |
