= Mitch Tambo =

Australian singer and songwriter

- Born: Sydney, Australia
- Origin: Australia
- Genres: Dance, electronic, hip-hop, pop
- Instruments: Vocals, Didgeridoo
- Years active: 2010–present
- Label: Sony (2019–2024)
- Website: www.mitchtambo.com

Mitch Tambo is an Aboriginal Australian singer, songwriter author, and political activist, who self-released his debut EP in 2016. In 2019, he reached the final of the ninth series of Australia's Got Talent and garnered national attention for his bilingual version of "You're the Voice", in Gamilaraay and English. In November 2019, Tambo was signed to Sony Music Australia, but left the label in 2024. In July 2024, he released the instrumental album Tambo Jamz Vol.1.

== Early life ==
Mitch Tambo was born in Sydney and moved to Tamworth when he was 18 months old. He says his mother, Roz Parker, empowered him to embrace his Gamilaraay culture and identity, while his Aunty Bernadette Duncan helped him revive his language.

In 2010, Tambo travelled to Rome for the canonisation of Mary MacKillop.

== Music career ==
In 2016, Tambo self-released his debut extended play titled Guurrama-Li. It was re-released on Songbird Records in July 2018.

In 2019, he auditioned for the ninth series of Australia's Got Talent, where he performed his single "Walanbaa". He progressed to the semi-final after receiving the golden buzzer from judge and former Pussycat Dolls lead singer Nicole Scherzinger. In the semi-final, he received another golden buzzer from judge Natalie Bassingthwaighte after performing a bilingual version of "You're the Voice" (in Gamilaraay and English) wearing the Dhinawan and Murray crest and feathers. He progressed to the final in September 2019, where his placing was undisclosed. Following his appearance on the show', Tambo's EP began charting on iTunes charts across the world, and a fan Twitter campaign was launched to have him represent Australia in the Eurovision Song Contest.

In November 2019, Tambo signed a record deal with Sony Music Australia. On 19 November 2019, Tambo was announced as a participant in Eurovision - Australia Decides; in an attempt to represent Australia in the Eurovision Song Contest 2020 with the song "Together". In the Eurovision - Australia Decides final, "Together" placed 5th in a field of 10. During the campaign for the Eurovision Song Contest, Tambo experienced toxic cyberbullying, which impacted his mental health.

In December 2019, and after performing it in the semi-final of Australia's Got Talent, Tambo released the bilingual version of "You're the Voice" in English and Gamilaraay. He performed the song at the NITV sunrise ceremony for Australia Day on 26 January, and later with John Farnham as the finale of the Fire Fight Australia concert in February 2020.

On 15 May 2020, Tambo released "Love". In a statement, Tambo said "'Love' is a reminder to reach deep down within, heal and set our spirits free with love, healing and hope for a better tomorrow."

In September 2022, Tambo released "Come Together" with Lee Kernaghan and Isaiah Firebrace.

In May 2023, he released "Yugal Yulu-gi", which means "song and dance". The song was used during the NRL Indigenous Round on Fox Sports.

On 3 September 2023, Tambo performed his bilingual version of "You're The Voice", standing in for John Farnham at a concert which was part of the "Yes" campaign in the 2023 Australian Indigenous Voice referendum, a vote to change the Australian Constitution to enshrine a Voice to Parliament for Indigenous Australians. The song played as a soundtrack for a video ad directed by filmmaker Warwick Thornton, which was rolled out on social and other digital media and television.

In 2024, Tambo left Sony Music. In July 2024, he released the instrumental album, Tambo Jamz Vol.1.

In September 2025, Tambo released the children's book I Am Me.

=== Musical styles ===
Tambo's music covers several genres, including dance, electronic, hip-hop, pop, and instrumental.

== Other activities ==
In 2013, Tambo hosted children's TV series Muso Magic Outback Tracks, a production which showcases and highlights positive stories in remote Aboriginal communities.

In 2015, he started True Culture, a program that empowers young people to explore their identity through cultural performance, mentor workshops, bush tucker, and art experiences and to empower disengaged kids, those in foster care or on the brink of juvenile justice.

== Personal life ==
Tambo is a Gamilaraay and Birri Gubba man and was living in Melbourne in 2019.

Tambo was expecting his first child with his wife Lele in November 2021.

== Discography ==
=== Albums ===
Title	Details
Tambo Jamz Vol.1	Release date: 3 July 2024; Label: Walanbaa Music; Formats: Digital download
I Am Me	Release date: 22 June 2026; Label: Walanbaa Music; Formats: digital download

=== Extended plays ===
Title	Details
Guurrama-Li	Release date: 2016; Label: self-released; Formats: Digital download

=== Singles ===
Title	Year	Album
"Walanbaa"	2017	Guurrama-Li
"Gulagama-Li"	2017	Guurrama-Li
"Yidaki"	2017	Guurrama-Li
"Dhiidhaan"	2017	Guurrama-Li
"You're the Voice"	2019	non-album single
"Together"	2020	Australia Decides
"Love"	2020	to be confirmed
"Absolutely Everybody"	2020	Deadly Hearts: Walking Together
"Dreamtime Princess"	2021	to be confirmed
"Heal"	2021	to be confirmed
"Come Together" (with Lee Kernaghan and Isaiah Firebrace)	2022	to be confirmed
"Silent Night (Gamilaraay)"	2022	to be confirmed
"Great Southern Land" (with Reigan)	2023	to be confirmed
"Yugal Yulu-gi"	2023	to be confirmed
"Away in a Manger"	2023	to be confirmed
"The Best"	2024	to be confirmed
"Amazing Grace" (with Voice of Lele)	2024	to be confirmed
"My Island Home (Gamilaraay)" (solo or with Voice of Lele)	2025	to be confirmed
"Blackfellas" (featuring Street Warriors and Jamahl Yami)	2025	to be confirmed
"Move Your Feet"	2025	to be confirmed
"Hokey Pokey" (Gamilaraay)	2025	I Am Me
"Out in the Country"	2026	I Am Me
"Funky Town"	2026	

== Awards and nominations ==
=== Country Music Awards of Australia ===
The Country Music Awards of Australia is an annual awards night held in January during the Tamworth Country Music Festival. Celebrating recording excellence in the Australian country music industry. They commenced in 1973.

Year	Nominee / work	Award	Result	Ref.
2023	"Come Together" (with Lee Kernaghan and Isaiah Firebrace)	Vocal Collaboration of the Year	Nominated	
2023	"Come Together" (with Lee Kernaghan and Isaiah Firebrace)	Heritage Song of the Year	Nominated	

=== Environmental Music Prize ===
The Environmental Music Prize is a quest to find a theme song to inspire action on climate and conservation. It commenced in 2022.

Year	Nominee / work	Award	Result	Ref.
2025	"Yugal Yulu-gi"	Environmental Music Prize	Nominated	

=== Music Victoria Awards ===
The Music Victoria Awards are an annual awards night recognising Victorian music. They commenced in 2006.

Year	Nominee / work	Award	Result	Ref.
2023	Mitch Tambo	Best Pop Work	Nominated	
2023	Mitch Tambo	MAV Diasporas Award	Nominated	

=== NIMA ===
The National Indigenous Music Awards is an annual awards ceremony that recognises the achievements of Indigenous Australians in music. The award ceremony commenced in 2004.

Year	Nominee / work	Award	Result	Ref.
2020	Mitch Tambo	New Talent of the Year	Nominated	
