= Eurovision – Australia Decides =

Australia Eurovision Song Contest preselection

- Genre: Song contest
- Presented by: Joel Creasey and Myf Warhurst
- Country of origin: Australia
- Original language: English
- No. of episodes: 3 editions

Production
- Production locations: Gold Coast Convention and Exhibition Centre, Gold Coast, Queensland
- Running time: 2 hours and 30 minutes
- Production company: Special Broadcasting Service (SBS)

Original release
- Release: 7 February 2019 – 26 February 2022

Related
- Eurovision Song Contest (1956–present)

Eurovision – Australia Decides was an annual song competition organised by Australian public broadcaster Special Broadcasting Service (SBS) and production partner Blink TV. It determined the country's representative for the Eurovision Song Contest between 2019 and 2022 (except in 2021, following the cancellation of the previous contest).

== Background ==
Australia debuted in the Eurovision Song Contest in 2015 by invitation from the European Broadcasting Union (EBU) as a "one-off" special guest to celebrate the 60th anniversary of Eurovision. On 17 November 2015, the EBU announced that SBS had been invited to participate in the 2016 contest and that Australia would once again take part. This invitation has been extended each year and Australia is invited to participate in the contest until at least 2023.

The entrants from 2015 until 2018 were internally selected. In September 2018, SBS announced that from 2019, it would organise a national contest to select the artist and the song that will compete at the 2019 Eurovision Song Contest and placed a call for entries. The show was to be called Eurovision – Australia Decides.

== Format ==
SBS asks for submissions, then selects ten entries and their running order for the contest. The contest takes place over a weekend in February, with a jury preview show, a matinee preview show and a live final. The winner is determined via the combination of public televote (50%) and the votes of a professional jury panel (50%).

== Discontinuation ==
In November 2022, six months after the Eurovision Song Contest 2022, SBS announced that it would not be continuing Eurovision – Australia Decides, reverting back to internally selecting the Australian entries for Eurovision.

== Contestants ==
2019 edition – Gold Coast
| Artist | Song | Running order | Jury votes | Televotes | Total points | Place |
|---|---|---|---|---|---|---|
| Ella Hooper | "Data Dust" | 1st | 12 | 6 | 18 | 10 |
| Electric Fields | "2000 and Whatever" | 2nd | 44 | 70 | 114 | 2 |
| Mark Vincent | "This Is Not the End" | 3rd | 19 | 19 | 38 | 7 |
| Aydan Calafiore | "Dust" | 4th | 38 | 10 | 48 | 6 |
| Courtney Act | "Fight for Love" | 5th | 26 | 26 | 52 | 4 |
| Leea Nanos | "Set Me Free" | 6th | 10 | 11 | 21 | 9 |
| Sheppard | "On My Way" | 7th | 41 | 46 | 87 | 3 |
| Alfie Arcuri | "To Myself" | 8th | 35 | 14 | 49 | 5 |
| Kate Miller-Heidke | "Zero Gravity" | 9th | 48 | 87 | 135 | 1 |
| Tania Doko | "Piece of Me" | 10th | 17 | 6 | 23 | 8 |

2020 edition – Gold Coast
| Artist | Song | Running order | Jury votes | Televotes | Total points | Place |
|---|---|---|---|---|---|---|
| Iota | "Life" | 1st | 19 | 13 | 32 | 9 |
| Jordan-Ravi | "Pushing Stars" | 2nd | 11 | 12 | 23 | 10 |
| Jaguar Jonze | "Rabbit Hole" | 3rd | 18 | 28 | 46 | 6 |
| Jack Vidgen | "I Am King I Am Queen" | 4th | 19 | 15 | 34 | 8 |
| Vanessa Amorosi | "Lessons of Love" | 5th | 42 | 40 | 82 | 3 |
| Diana Rouvas | "Can We Make Heaven" | 6th | 24 | 18 | 42 | 7 |
| Mitch Tambo | "Together | 7th | 24 | 33 | 57 | 5 |
| Casey Donovan | "Proud" | 8th | 40 | 60 | 100 | 2 |
| Montaigne | "Don't Break Me" | 9th | 54 | 53 | 107 | 1 |
| Didirri | "Raw Stuff" | 10th | 39 | 24 | 63 | 4 |

2022 edition – Gold Coast
| Artist | Song | Running order | Jury votes | Televotes | Total points | Place |
|---|---|---|---|---|---|---|
| G-Nation | "Bite Me" | 1st | 11 | 45 | 56 | 5 |
| Erica Padilla | "To the Bottom" | 2nd | 20 | 25 | 45 | 9 |
| Seann Miley Moore | "My Body" | 3rd | 18 | 5 | 23 | 11 |
| Charley | "I Suck at Being Lonely" | 4th | 33 | 30 | 63 | 4 |
| Andrew Lambrou | "Electrify" | 5th | 16 | 35 | 51 | 7 |
| Sheldon Riley | "Not the Same" | 6th | 50 | 50 | 100 | 1 |
| Paulini | "We Are One" | 7th | 32 | 20 | 52 | 6 |
| Jaguar Jonze | "Little Fires" | 8th | 51 | 40 | 91 | 3 |
| Isaiah Firebrace and Evie Irie | "When I'm with You" | 9th | 35 | 10 | 45 | 10 |
| Voyager | "Dreamer" | 10th | 37 | 60 | 97 | 2 |
| Jude York | "I Won't Need to Dream" | 11th | 32 | 15 | 47 | 8 |

== Eurovision Song Contest results ==
| Year | Artist | Song | Final | Points | Semi | Points |
|---|---|---|---|---|---|---|
| 2019 | Kate Miller-Heidke | "Zero Gravity" | 9 | 284 | 1 | 261 |
| 2020 | Montaigne | "Don't Break Me" | Contest cancelled (Note: The 2020 contest was cancelled due to the COVID-19 pandemic.) X | | | |
| 2022 | Sheldon Riley | "Not the Same" | 15 | 125 | 2 | 243 |
