= Don't Break Me =

2020 song by Montaigne

Single by Montaigne
- Released: 31 January 2020
- Genre: Pop
- Length: 3:00
- Label: Wonderlick
- Songwriters: Jessica Cerro; Anthony Egizii; David Musumeci
- Producer: DNA

Montaigne singles chronology
"The Dying Song" (2019)	"Don't Break Me" (2020)	"Technicolour" (2021)

Live video
- "Don't Break Me" on YouTube

Eurovision Song Contest 2020 entry
- Country: Australia
- Artist: Montaigne
- Language: English
- Composers: Jessica Cerro; Anthony Egizii; David Musumeci
- Lyricists: Jessica Cerro; Anthony Egizii; David Musumeci

Finals performance
- Semi-final result: Contest cancelled

Entry chronology
- ◄ "Zero Gravity" (2019)
- "Technicolour" (2021) ►

"Don't Break Me" is a song by Australian singer-songwriter Montaigne, released as a single on 31 January 2020. The song won the second installment of Eurovision - Australia Decides, Australia's national selection for Eurovision on 8 February 2020, and was going to represent Australia at the Eurovision Song Contest 2020, to be held in Rotterdam, before the contest was cancelled due to the COVID-19 pandemic. Montaigne was due to compete in the first semi-final which was meant to be held on 12 May 2020.

== Background ==
Montaigne said "'Don't Break Me' is a depiction of the enough is enough phase of a relationship breakdown, where one person feels like they are putting much more time, energy and resources into the relationship than the other person and becomes frustrated and resentful. I wrote it while reading 'Co-dependent No More' by Melody Beattie, which really informed the qualities of the character and the relationship dynamic."

== Eurovision – Australia Decides ==
Montaigne performed the song wearing a clown costume including a blue wig, and flanked by backing dancers. The song was awarded the most jury points (54) and second highest public televote points (53) for a total of 107, winning Australia's second national selection competition for Eurovision.

== Charts ==
Chart (2020)	Peak position
Australia Digital Tracks (ARIA)	22
