= Australia in the Eurovision Song Contest =

- Eurovision Song Contest
- Participating broadcaster: Special Broadcasting Service (SBS)

Participation summary
- Appearances: 11 (8 finals)
- First appearance: 2015
- Highest placement: 2nd: 2016
- Participation history: 2015; 2016; 2017; 2018; 2019; ~~2020~~; 2021; 2022; 2023; 2024; 2025; 2026

Related articles
- Eurovision – Australia Decides

External links
- SBS page Eurovision – Australia Decides website
- Australia's page at Eurovision.com
- For the most recent participation see Australia in the Eurovision Song Contest 2026

Australia has been represented at the Eurovision Song Contest eleven times since first taking part in 2015. The Australian participating broadcaster in the contest is the Special Broadcasting Service (SBS), which received special approval from the European Broadcasting Union (EBU) to participate. Australia is the first country outside the European Broadcasting Area to have ever competed to date.

Australia has finished in the top ten six times, with its best result being a second-place finish with "Sound of Silence" performed by Dami Im in 2016, followed by "Eclipse" by Delta Goodrem finishing fourth in 2026 and "Tonight Again" by Guy Sebastian finishing fifth in 2015, then "Don't Come Easy" by Isaiah, "Zero Gravity" by Kate Miller-Heidke, and "Promise" by Voyager finishing ninth in 2017, 2019, and 2023 respectively.

Initially, Australia's participation in the 2015 contest was set to be a one-off event, the plan being only to perform again the following year had it won, but it was confirmed in November 2015 by SVT that it would participate in the 2016 contest, and it has participated every year since.

The contest attracts a significantly high viewership for SBS, and has a broad and active national fanbase. Due to time differences with the European host cities, the event typically airs at 05:00 Australian Eastern Standard Time (AEST). The contest receives widespread mainstream media coverage in the country, and also enjoys a cult following amongst dedicated fans each year.

== History ==
=== 1983–2014 ===
Australian broadcaster Special Broadcasting Service (SBS) is an associated member of the European Broadcasting Union (EBU). It first broadcast the Eurovision Song Contest in 1983 and has continued to do so every year since. The contest has attracted a strong viewing audience in Australia. Early broadcasts of the contest in the country either featured no commentary or borrowed the BBC's commentary. In 2001, actress and comedian Mary Coustas provided commentary for the contest performing as her comedic character Effie. In 2003 and 2004, SBS presenter Des Mangan provided commentary for the Australian audience. In 2009, Julia Zemiro and Sam Pang were assigned as commentators for the competition by SBS. 2017 saw SBS replace the commentators with comedian Joel Creasey and TV and radio personality Myf Warhurst. In addition to broadcasting the contest, SBS also broadcast the 50th and 60th anniversary programmes.

From 2010 to 2014, SBS allowed Australian viewers to participate in their own televote for the final. However, these votes were not counted at the actual contest and did not affect the overall result. The SBS commentary team and Australian delegation have been allocated a commentary booth from 2012 onwards.

Australia's first appearance in the international broadcast of the Eurovision Song Contest occurred on 14 May 2013 during the first semi-final in Malmö, Sweden. A short pre-recorded video titled "Greetings from Australia" (also referred to as "Why Australia Loves Eurovision"), submitted by SBS and hosted by Julia Zemiro, was broadcast during the interval acts. This presentation marked 30 years of broadcasting the Eurovision Song Contest in Australia, and was preceded the week leading up to the contest by a locally broadcast documentary, also hosted by Zemiro, titled The Heart of Eurovision. On 24 March 2014, the Danish host broadcaster DR gave SBS permission to perform as an interval act in the second semi-final of the 2014 contest. One day later, on 25 March, Jessica Mauboy was internally selected to perform. On 8 May 2014, Mauboy sang her song "Sea of Flags".

=== 2015–present: Participation ===
SBS made its debut at the 2015 contest with the song "Tonight Again", performed by Guy Sebastian. Although Australia is outside the European Broadcasting Area and SBS is not a full member of the EBU, the EBU and Austrian host broadcaster ORF decided to permit an Australian entry to commemorate the 60th contest. The special circumstances surrounding Australia's entry and "to not reduce the chances" of the semi-final participants led the organisers to allow Australia to compete directly in the final, without going through a semi-final. In the event that Australia should win the contest, the EBU had confirmed that in accordance with the rules, SBS would not host the following contest in the Southern Hemisphere, and instead would co-host the event with a full member of the EBU in the country of the latter. Further to the EBU's statement, it was confirmed that Germany's participating broadcaster Norddeutscher Rundfunk (NDR) would be the first choice, and the United Kingdom's British Broadcasting Corporation (BBC) would be the back-up should NDR decline.

Although Australia's participation in 2015 was announced as a one-off event, it was confirmed on 17 November 2015 that Australia would participate in the 2016 contest. Unlike in 2015, Australia did not receive automatic qualification. On 7 October 2015, it was announced that Australia would make its debut in the Junior Eurovision Song Contest 2015 after SBS was invited to perform in the contest. The Australian entry for the 2016 contest was "Sound of Silence" by Dami Im, which won the second semi-final before finishing second overall behind Ukraine.

Australia continued its participation at the 2017 contest following their success the previous year. On 7 March 2017, at the Paris Cat Jazz Club in Melbourne, SBS announced former X Factor Australia winner Isaiah Firebrace as Australia's entry. With the song "Don't Come Easy", Isaiah participated in the first semi-final on 9 May, then qualified for the final on 13 May in which Australia placed 9th.

Australia competed in the 2018 contest, selecting Jessica Mauboy as the artist to represent the country with "We Got Love". Although this continued Australia's track record of perfect attendance in the final, it was the first instance of them not finishing in the top ten, ending in 20th place with 99 points, only nine of which came from the televote, the first time that Australia finished last in the televote.

In 2019 Australian viewers chose their Eurovision representative. The Eurovision - Australia Decides national final took place on 9 February 2019, with a 50/50 say between an Australian jury and a televote to determine who would represent the country at the 2019 contest. Eurovision – Australia Decides was hosted in Gold Coast, Queensland by Myf Warhurst and Joel Creasey. The winner was Kate Miller-Heidke with the song "Zero Gravity". Runners-up Electric Fields were selected as the Australian jury spokespersons. Ahead of the contest in Tel Aviv, Israel, Australia's participation in the contest was confirmed by the EBU and SBS until 2023. Australia went on to finish ninth in the final, after winning the first semi-final.

SBS announced it would host Eurovision – Australia Decides – Gold Coast 2020 to choose their representative for the 2020 contest. The event was held on the Gold Coast from 7–8 February, and Montaigne with "Don't Break Me" emerged as the winner. Following the cancellation of the 2020 contest, SBS internally selected Montaigne to represent Australia in the 2021 contest, this time with "Technicolour". For the first time since its 2015 debut, Australia failed to qualify for the final, finishing 14th in the first semi-final with 28 points.

Eurovision – Australia Decides returned to select the Australian entry for the 2022 contest. The show took place on 26 February, and was won by Sheldon Riley with the song "Not the Same". At the contest in Turin, Italy, Australia went on to finish in 15th place in the final with 125 points, after finishing in second place in the second semi-final with 243 points.

For the 2023 contest, SBS internally selected Voyager, who had finished runner-up in Eurovision – Australia Decides the year prior, to represent the country with the song "Promise". They qualified for the final, which took place on 13 May, and finished ninth overall with 151 points. On 21 September 2023, SBS was revealed to be discussing its participation beyond 2023, and Australia ultimately appeared on the official list of participants for the 2024 contest on 5 December 2023. Electric Fields were internally selected to represent the country in 2024 with "One Milkali (One Blood)", but failed to qualify for the final, finishing 11th in the first semi-final with 41 points. In 2025 SBS internally selected Go-Jo with the song "Milkshake Man", but it failed to qualify to the final for the 2nd year in a row, finishing 11th in the second semi-final with 41 points for the 2nd year in a row, finishing only 10 points behind Armenia. SBS confirmed that Australia was going to be represented by Delta Goodrem in the 2026 contest, with the song "Eclipse", which ended up qualifying for the final for the first time since 2023. Australia finished in the fourth place, marking the country's second-best Eurovision result.

== Participation overview ==
Table key
1	First place
2	Second place
3	Third place
◇	Entry selected but did not compete

Year	Artist	Song	Language	Final	Points	Semi	Points
2015	Guy Sebastian	"Tonight Again"	English	5	196	Automatically qualified (Note: The organisers allowed Australia to compete in the grand final without pre-qualification due to the special circumstances surrounding Australia's entry and so as "to not reduce the chances" of the semi-final participants.)	
2016	Dami Im	"Sound of Silence"	English	2	511	1	330
2017	Isaiah Firebrace	"Don't Come Easy"	English	9	173	6	160
2018	Jessica Mauboy	"We Got Love"	English	20	99	4	212
2019	Kate Miller-Heidke	"Zero Gravity"	English	9	284	1	261
2020	Montaigne ◇	"Don't Break Me" ◇	English ◇	Contest cancelled (Note: The 2020 contest was cancelled due to the COVID-19 pandemic.)			
2021	Montaigne	"Technicolour"	English	Failed to qualify		14	28
2022	Sheldon Riley	"Not the Same"	English	15	125	2	243
2023	Voyager	"Promise"	English	9	151	1	149
2024	Electric Fields	"One Milkali (One Blood)"	English, Yankunytjatjara	Failed to qualify		11	41
2025	Go-Jo	"Milkshake Man"	English	Failed to qualify		11	41
2026	Delta Goodrem	"Eclipse"	English	4	287	3	222
2027	Confirmed intention to participate †						

== Other awards ==
=== Marcel Bezençon Awards ===
Year	Award	Song	Composer(s)	Performer	Final	Points	Host city	Ref.
2016	Composer Award	"Sound of Silence"	Anthony Egizii, David Musumeci	Dami Im	2	511	(Sweden) Stockholm	
2019	Artistic Award	"Zero Gravity"	Kate Miller-Heidke, Keir Nuttall, Julian Hamilton	Kate Miller-Heidke	9	284	(Israel) Tel Aviv	
2026	Media Award	"Eclipse"	Delta Goodrem, Ferras Alqaisi, Jonas Myrin, Michael Fatkin	Delta Goodrem	4	287	(Austria) Vienna	

=== You're a Vision Award ===
Year	Performer	Host city	Ref.
2022	Sheldon Riley	(Italy) Turin	

== Related involvement ==
=== Heads of delegation ===
Each participating broadcaster in the Eurovision Song Contest assigns a head of delegation as the EBU's contact person and the leader of their delegation at the event. The delegation, whose size can greatly vary, includes a head of press, the performers, songwriters, composers, and backing vocalists, among others.

Year	Head of delegation	Ref.
2015–2019	Paul Clarke	
2020–2021	Josh Martin	
2022–present	Emily Griggs	

=== Jury members ===
Each participating broadcaster assembles a five-member jury panel consisting of music industry professionals for the semi-finals and final of the Eurovision Song Contest, ranking all entries except for their own. The juries' votes add 50% to the overall result alongside televoting.

Year	Jury members					Ref.
2015	Amanda Pelman	Richard Wilkins	Danielle Spencer	Ash London	Jake Stone	
2016	Monica Trapaga	Shannon Noll	Myf Warhurst	James Mathison	Craig Porteils	
2017	Lucy Durack	Natasha Cupitt	Steven Capaldo	Jackie Loeb	Peter Hayward	
2018	Richard Wilkins	Zan Rowe	Jordan Raskopoulos	L-FRESH the Lion	Millie Millgate	
2019	Mark Humphries	Christine Anu	Lewis Hobba	Alice Chance	Mark Cummins	
2021	Millie Millgate	Jack Vidgen	Ash London	Brooke Boney	Kamahl	
2022	Dylan Lewis	Montaigne	Matt Okine	Bridget Hustwaite	Milly Petriella	
2023	Andrew Farriss	Toni Pearen	Eddie Perfect	Brihony Dawson	Latifa Tee	
2024	Alfie Arcuri	Mason Watts	Jane Albert	Meagan Loader	Mia Rodriguez	
2025	Andrew Lambrou	Robbie Buck	Claire Howell	Kylie Burtland	Simone Dow	

=== Commentators and spokespeople ===
The contest has been also known to have aired on radio stations, including 2EA and 3EA in 1981 and SBS Radio 4 in 2016.

Year	Channel(s)	Commentator(s)	Spokesperson	Ref.
1971	Network 7	Unknown	Did not participate	
1972–1974	No television broadcast		Did not participate	
1975	Unknown		Did not participate	
1976–1982	No television broadcast		Did not participate	
1983	Channel 0/28	Terry Wogan	Did not participate	
1984	Network 0–28	Unknown	Did not participate	
1985	SBS TV	Unknown	Did not participate	
1986	SBS TV	Unknown	Did not participate	
1987	SBS TV	Unknown	Did not participate	
1988	SBS TV	Unknown	Did not participate	
1989	SBS TV	Unknown	Did not participate	
1990	SBS TV	Unknown	Did not participate	
1991	SBS TV	Unknown	Did not participate	
1992	SBS TV	Unknown	Did not participate	
1993	SBS TV	Unknown	Did not participate	
1994	SBS TV	Unknown	Did not participate	
1995	SBS TV	Unknown	Did not participate	
1996	SBS TV	Unknown	Did not participate	
1997	SBS TV	Unknown	Did not participate	
1998	SBS TV	Unknown	Did not participate	
1999	SBS TV	Unknown	Did not participate	
2000	SBS TV	Unknown	Did not participate	
2001	SBS TV	Effie Stephanidis; Terry Wogan (Note: Delayed repeat broadcast following viewer complaints)	Did not participate	
2002	SBS TV	Terry Wogan	Did not participate	
2003	SBS TV	Des Mangan; Terry Wogan	Did not participate	
2004	SBS TV	Des Mangan	Did not participate	
2005	SBS TV	Paddy O'Connell (semi-final); Terry Wogan (final)	Did not participate	
2006	SBS TV	Paddy O'Connell (semi-final); Terry Wogan (final)	Did not participate	
2007	SBS TV	Paddy O'Connell and Sarah Cawood (semi-final); Terry Wogan (final)	Did not participate	
2008	SBS TV	Paddy O'Connell and Caroline Flack (semi-finals); Terry Wogan (final); Julia Zemiro (additional segments)	Did not participate	
2009	SBS TV	Julia Zemiro and Sam Pang	Did not participate	
2010	SBS One	Julia Zemiro and Sam Pang	Did not participate	
2011	SBS One, SBS HD	Julia Zemiro and Sam Pang	Did not participate	
2012	SBS One	Julia Zemiro and Sam Pang	Did not participate	
2013	SBS One	Julia Zemiro and Sam Pang	Did not participate	
2014	SBS One	Julia Zemiro and Sam Pang	Did not participate	
2015	SBS One	Julia Zemiro and Sam Pang	Lee Lin Chin	
2016	SBS	Julia Zemiro and Sam Pang	Lee Lin Chin	
2017	SBS	Myf Warhurst and Joel Creasey	Lee Lin Chin	
2018	SBS	Myf Warhurst and Joel Creasey	Ricardo Gonçalves	
2019	SBS	Myf Warhurst and Joel Creasey	Electric Fields	
~~2020~~	~~SBS~~	Not announced before cancellation		
2021	SBS	Myf Warhurst and Joel Creasey	Joel Creasey	
2022	SBS	Myf Warhurst and Joel Creasey	Courtney Act	
2023	SBS	Myf Warhurst and Joel Creasey	Catherine Martin	
2024	SBS	Myf Warhurst and Joel Creasey	Danny Estrin	
2025	SBS	Courtney Act and Tony Armstrong	Silia Kapsis	
2026	SBS	Courtney Act and Danny Estrin	Dami Im	

== Photo gallery ==
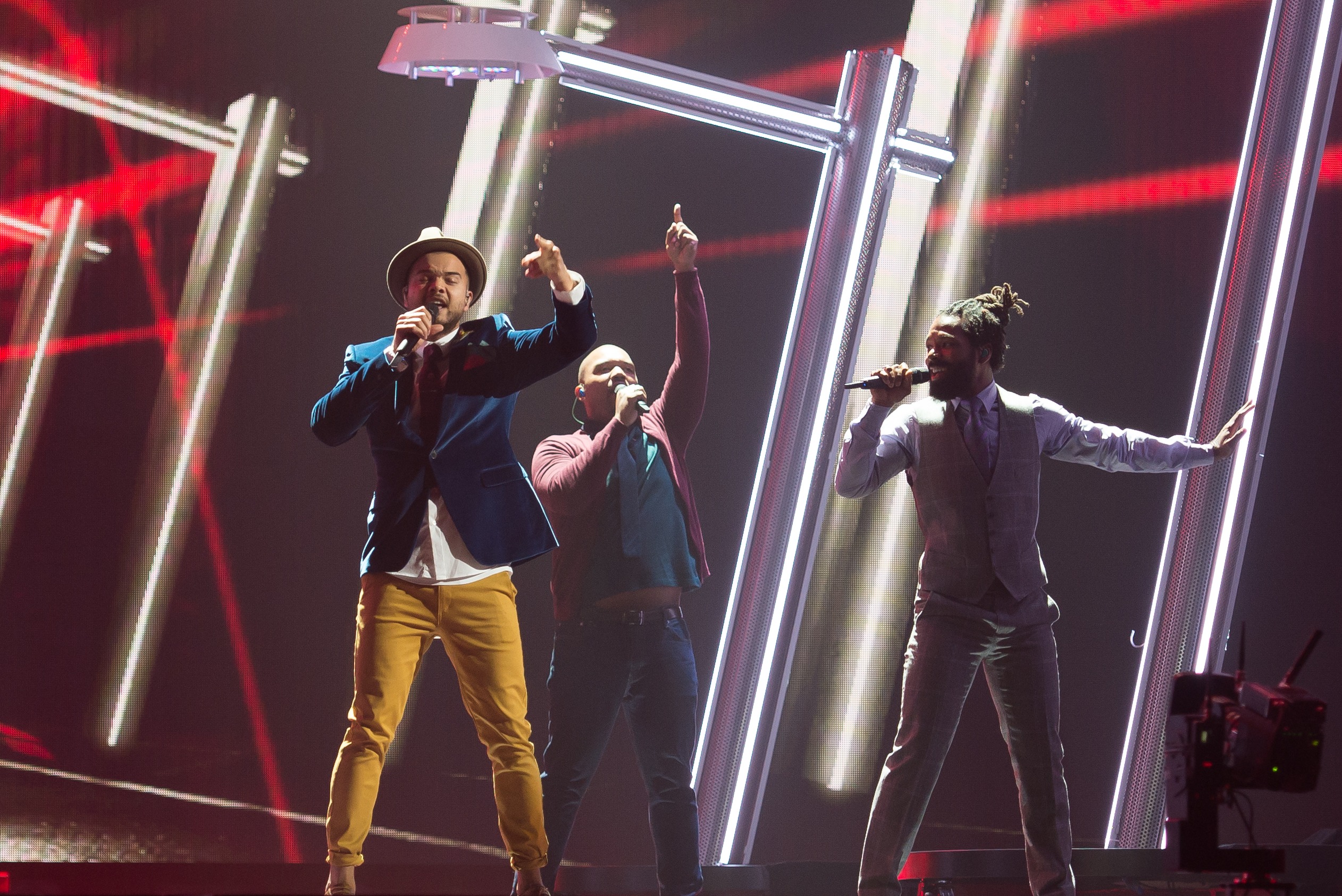
Guy Sebastian in Vienna (2015)

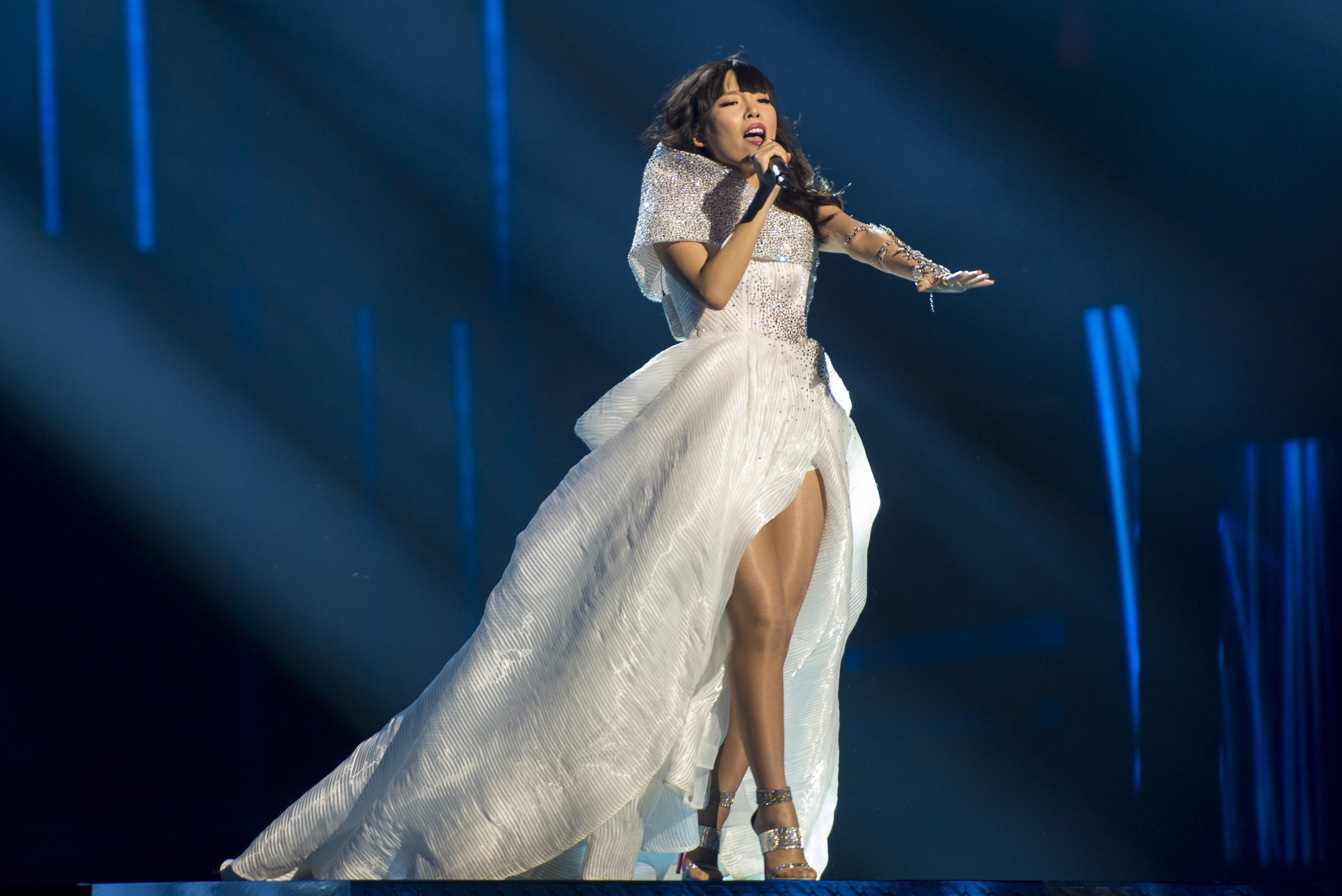
Dami Im in Stockholm (2016)

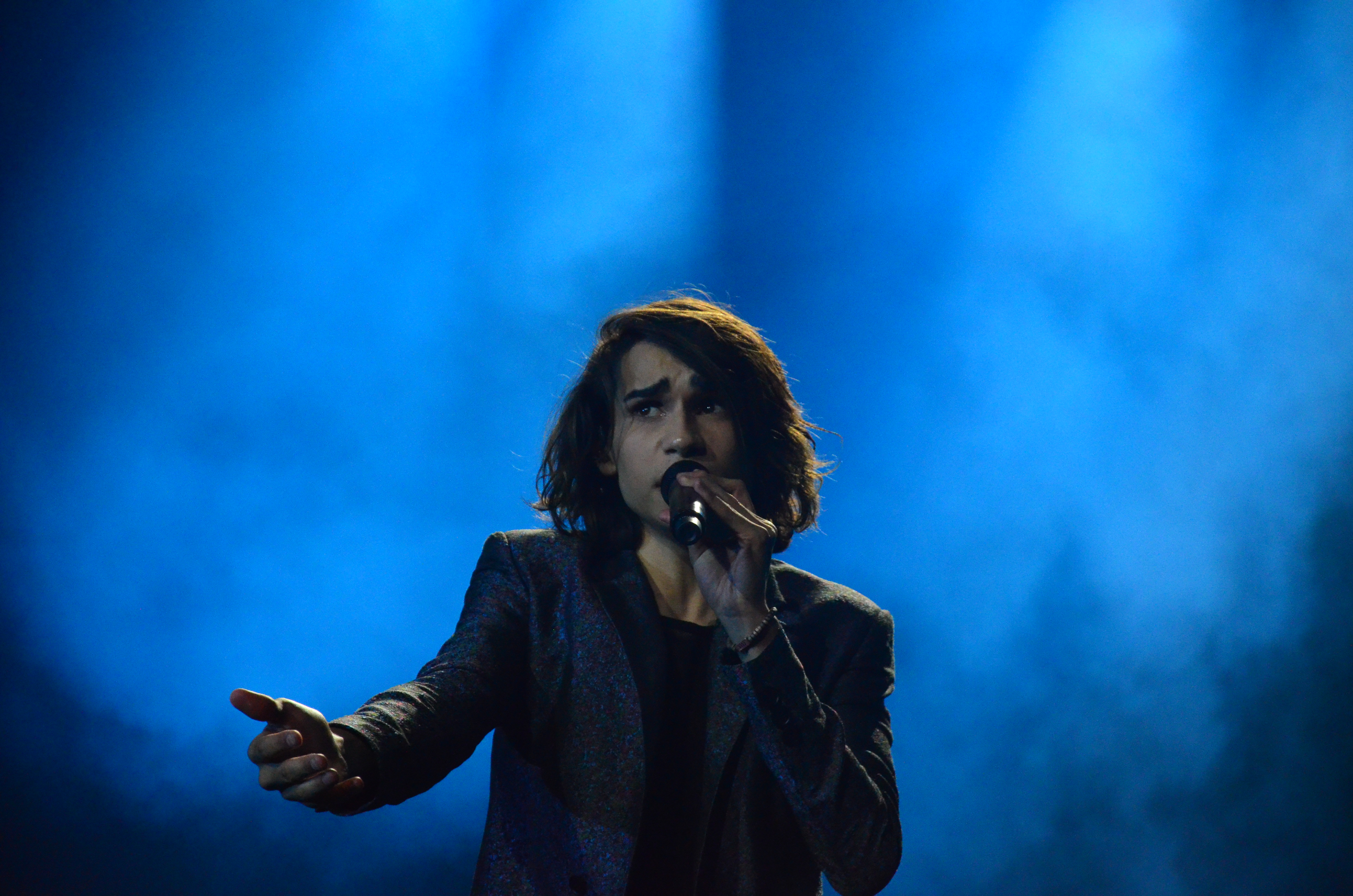
Isaiah in Kyiv (2017)

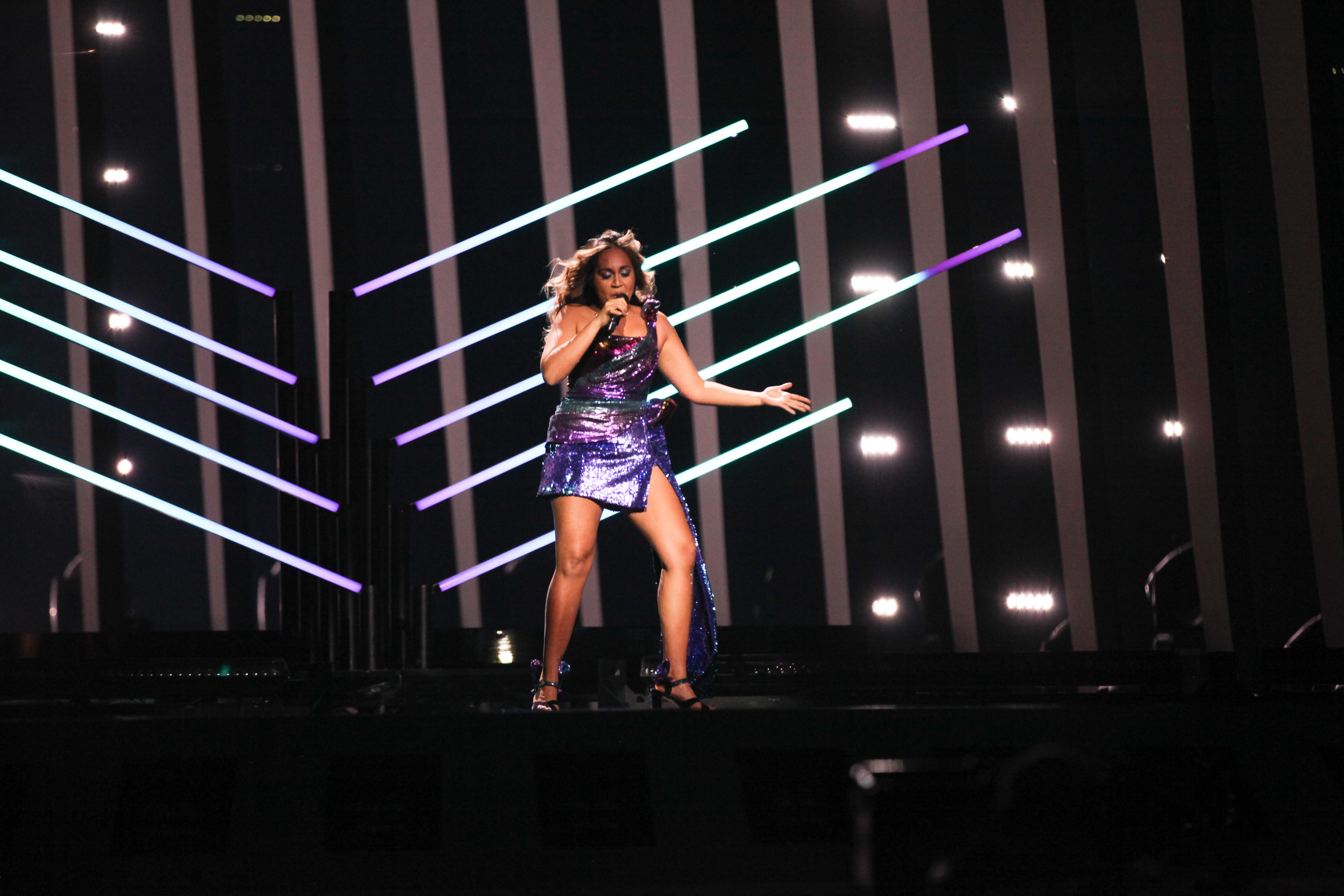
Jessica Mauboy in Lisbon (2018)

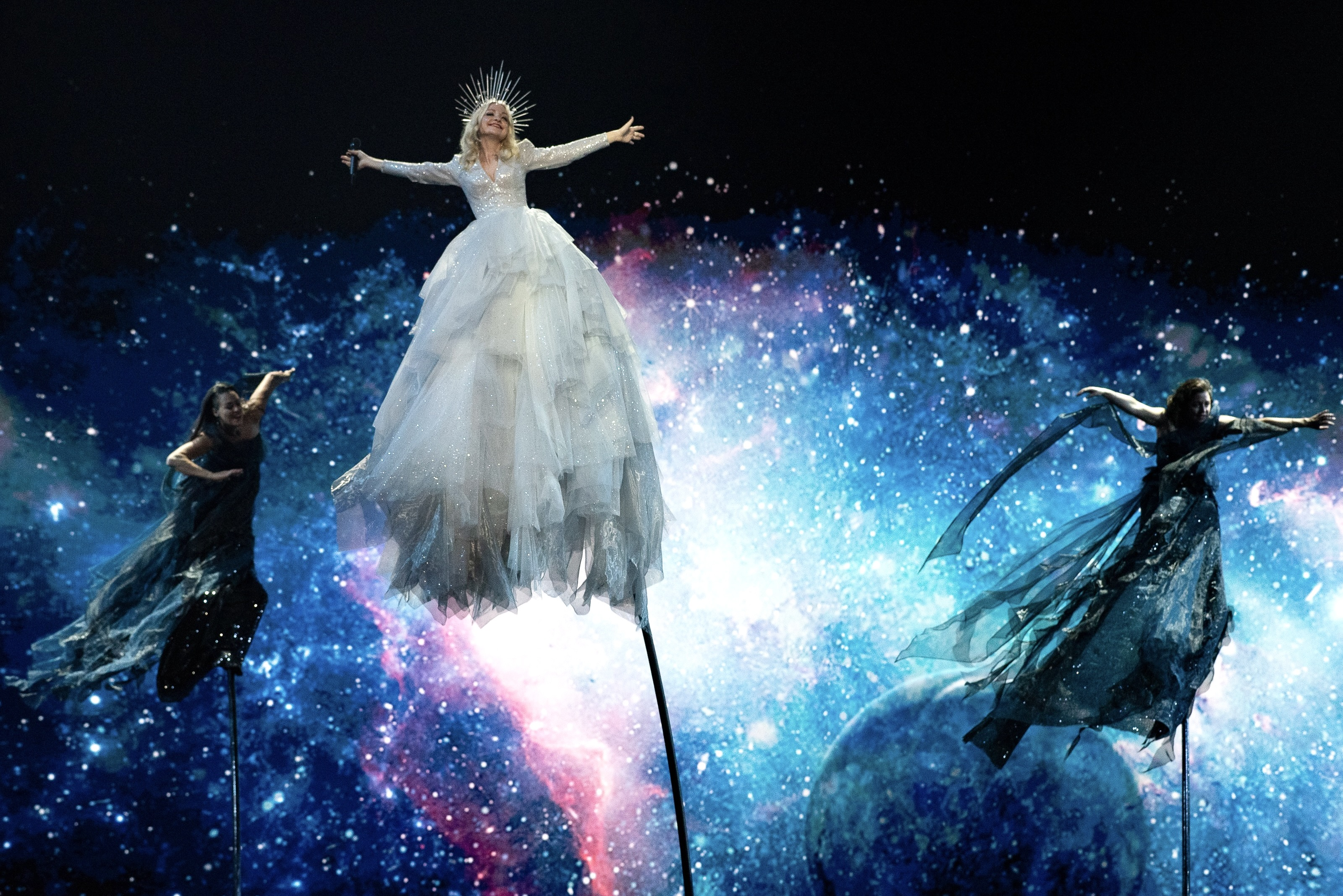
Kate Miller-Heidke in Tel Aviv (2019)

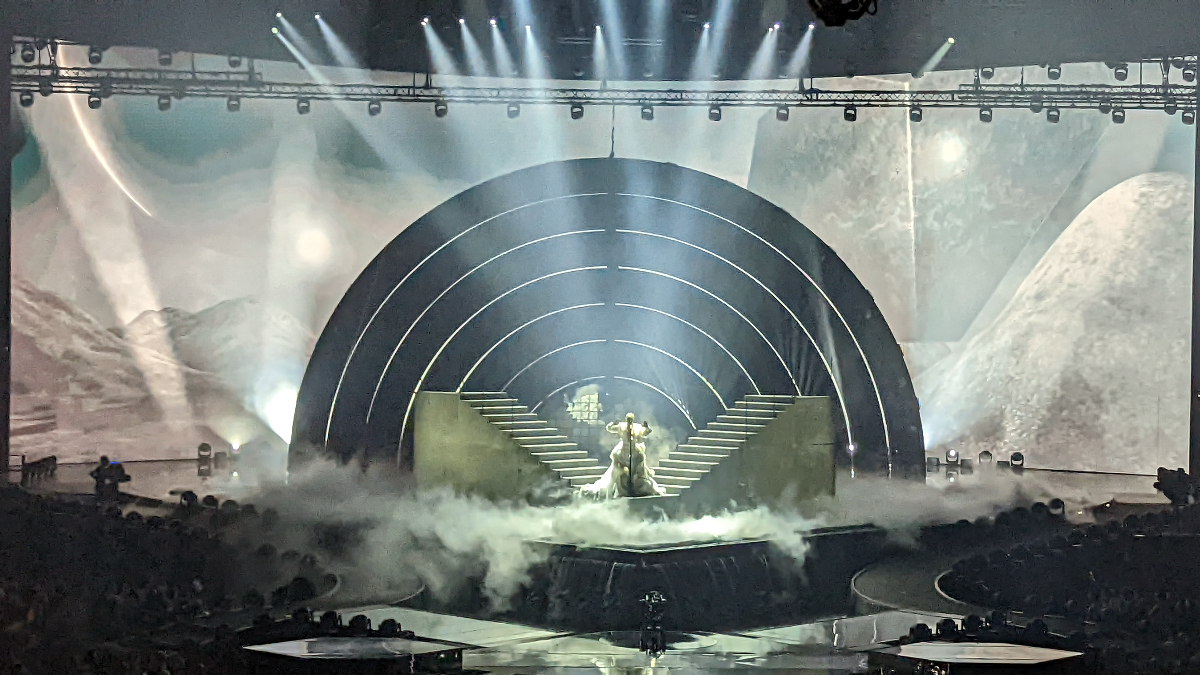
Sheldon Riley in Turin (2022)

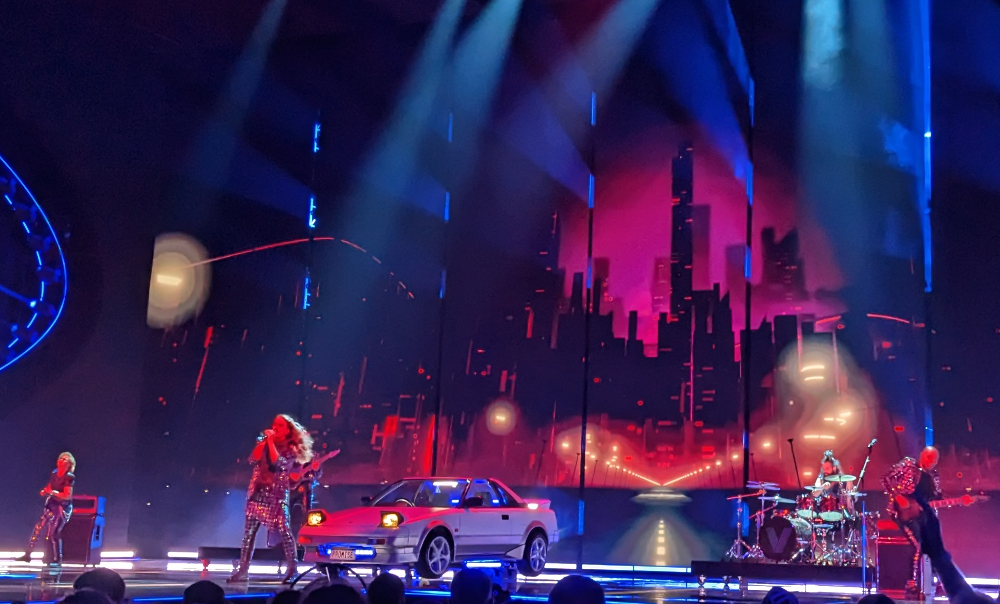
Voyager in Liverpool (2023)

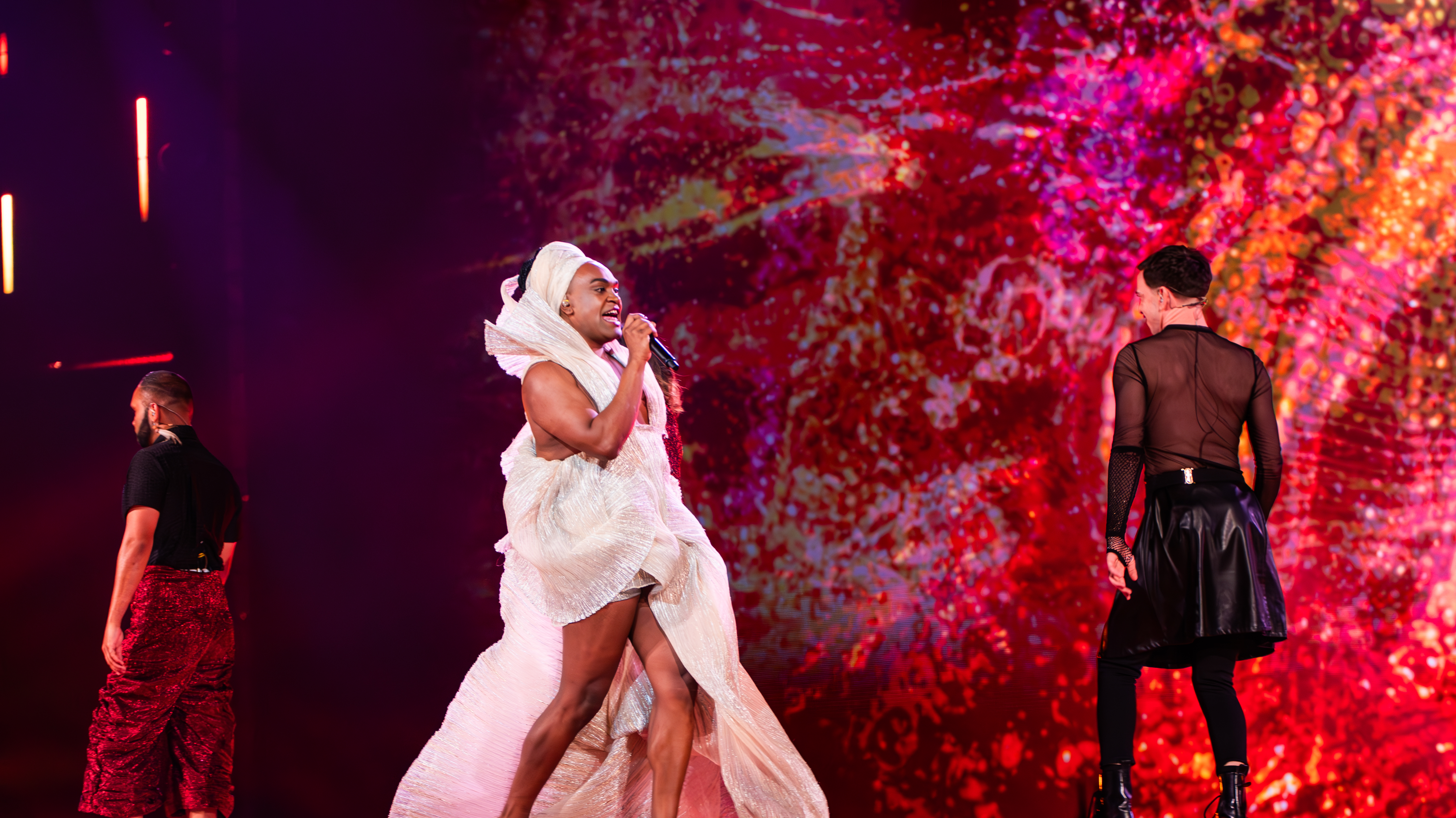
Electric Fields in Malmö (2024)

Go-Jo in Basel (2025)

Delta Goodrem in Vienna (2026)

== See also ==
- Australia in the Junior Eurovision Song Contest – Junior version of the Eurovision Song Contest.
- Australia in the ABU Radio Song Festival
- Australia in the ABU TV Song Festival
