= Barbara Dex =

Belgian singer

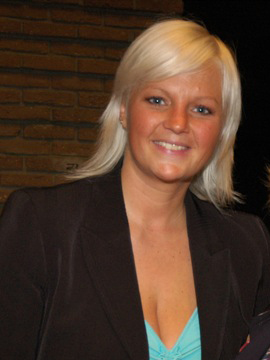
- Born: Barbara Maria Karel Deckx; 22 January 1974 (age 52); Turnhout, Belgium
- Occupation: Singer

Barbara Maria Karel Deckx (born 22 January 1974), better known by her stage name Barbara Dex, is a Belgian singer who represented her country in the Eurovision Song Contest 1993 with the song "Iemand als jij".

Dex had qualified via the Belgian national heat, Eurosong 93, held at the Casino Knokke on 6 March. At the Eurovision in Millstreet, she performed seventh, after Greece's entry "Ellada, chora tou fotos" and before Malta's song "This Time". Dex came last, in 25th place.

Dex returned to the Belgian final in 2004, teaming up with Alides for the song "One Life" which placed third. A further Eurovision attempt came in 2006 with the country line-dancing flavoured "Crazy" which earned her fifth place.

Dex was born in Turnhout, one of the three children of Marcel Deckx, a Belgian singer better known by his stage name Marc Dex. Her brother Tom Deckx has played bass guitar in the musical groups Tush and Nuts.

== Discography ==
=== Albums ===
First album Iemand contains songs in Dutch. Since 1994 she has performed songs only in English.

- Iemand (1993)
- Waiting for a New Moon (1994)
- Tender Touch (1996)
- Strong (1998)
- Timeless (2001)
- Enjoy: a Taste of Gospel (2003)
- Blue-eyed Girl (2006)
- Only One Me (2008)
- I Am Barbara Dex (2011)
- Dex, Drugs & Rock 'n Roll (2016)

=== Singles ===
- "One life" (2004)
- "Crazy" (2006)
- "I am" (2010)
- "Before" (2011)

== Barbara Dex Award ==
The Barbara Dex Award was an annual fan award for the worst dressed artist in the Eurovision Song Contest, awarded between 1997 and 2016 by fansite House of Eurovision, and from 2017 until 2021 by Songfestival.be. It was then discontinued and replaced by the You're a Vision Award.

Preceded by Morgane with "Nous, on veut des violons"	Belgium in the Eurovision Song Contest; 1993	Succeeded by Frédéric Etherlinck with "La voix est libre"
