= Myf Warhurst's Nice =

Australian documentary series (2012)

- Genre: Documentary
- Presented by: Myf Warhurst
- Country of origin: Australia
- Original language: English
- No. of series: 1
- No. of episodes: 6

Production
- Production company: That's Nice Productions

Original release
- Network: ABC
- Release: June 13 – July 18, 2012

Myf Warhurst's Nice is an Australian documentary series broadcast by the ABC in 2012. Presented by Myf Warhurst it had 6 episodes looking back memories from her youth. In The Sydney Morning Herald Melinda Houston said the "series is certainly nice but, sadly, not much more than that." Tiffany Fox of The West Australian wrote "a few teeth would add welcome bite to this gentle meander down memory lane."
