= Jaguar Jonze =

Australian singer

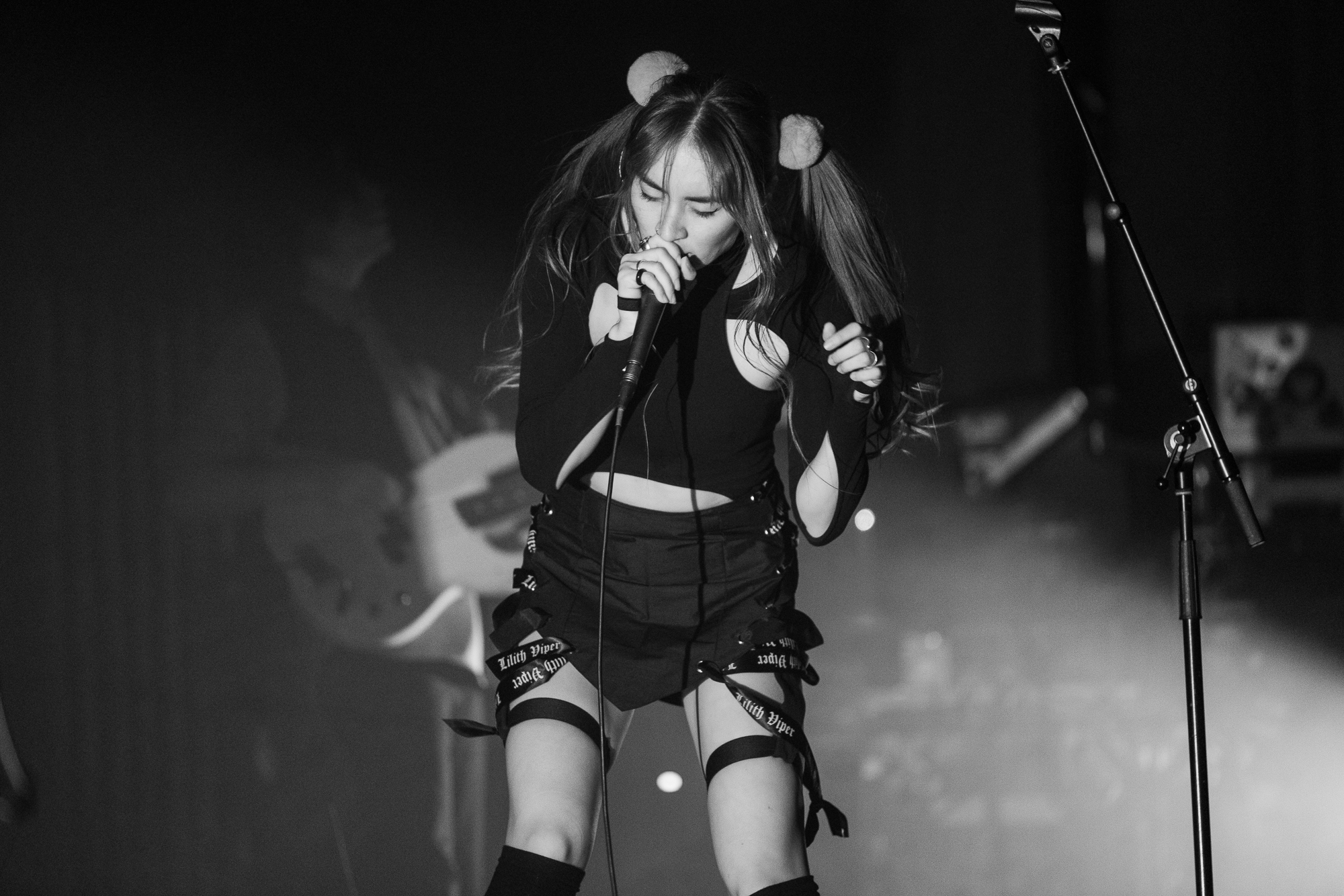
- Jonze in 2021

Background information
- Also known as: Deena; Spectator Jonze; Dusky Jonze
- Born: Deena Lynch; 12 January 1992 (age 34); Yokohama, Japan
- Origin: Brisbane, Queensland, Australia
- Genres: Indie rock; alternative rock
- Occupations: Singer; songwriter; musician; visual artist; photographer
- Instruments: Vocals; production; acoustic guitar; keyboards; organ
- Years active: 2012–present
- Labels: Independent; Nettwerk
- Website: jaguarjonze.com

Deena Lynch (born 12 January 1992), commonly known as Jaguar Jonze, is an Australian singer, songwriter and multi-instrumentalist from Brisbane, Queensland. Lynch has additionally worked as a visual artist and a photographer, under the pseudonyms Spectator Jonze and Dusky Jonze, respectively. She is best known for her participations in Australia Decides 2020 and 2022, where she placed 6th and 3rd respectively.

== Career ==
=== 2012–2017: Early career ===
Deena Lynch was born in Yokohama, Japan to a Taiwanese mother and Australian father. She relocated to Australia at age seven. As a child, she experienced abuse and was later diagnosed with complex post-traumatic stress disorder. By 2009, she was based in Brisbane.

In 2012, Lynch released her first album, Lone Wolf, as Deena and in 2015 followed with a second album, Black Cat, which included the single "Cupid". For the latter album she provided vocals, acoustic guitar, keyboards and organ; she was assisted by Joe Fallon on electric guitar and organ; Jack Killalea on bass guitar and guitar; Luke Sampson on drums and percussion. In 2015, she also released the single "Turpentine". All albums and singles under the performance name Deena, were removed from her streaming services, however some albums remained physically available in stores in 2020. Her two music videos under Deena, "Cupid" and "Turpentine", remain unlisted on YouTube.

=== 2018–2025: Australia Decides & Bunny Mode ===
In 2018 Lynch released her first single under the stage name Jaguar Jonze, "You Got Left Behind". She released three more singles, "Beijing Baby", "Kill Me with Your Love", and "Rabbit Hole" during 2019 to 2020. These were included on the extended play, Diamonds & Liquid Gold, alongside two new tracks, "Rising Sun", and the title track. During 2019, as Spectator Jonze, she displayed her visual artworks at the Brisbane Street Art Festival, and in the following year she was a finalist for the Brisbane Portrait Prize with Deena IX: Waking the Tiger. She developed the photographer persona, Dusky Jonze, as "a dialogue with the body".

In February 2020, Jaguar Jonze was a contestant on Australia Decides, entering "Rabbit Hole" to compete for Australia's Eurovision entry. She came 6th place, with 46 points. Lynch released a cover version of Britney Spears' song "Toxic". While in New York, Lynch cut short her American tour and returned to Australia in mid-March, to land in Sydney, where she was diagnosed with COVID-19. Later that year, she released two more singles, "Deadalive" and "Murder".

In November 2020, Lynch was commissioned by Christian Louboutin to create a concept film, visual artworks and photos featuring herself, in collaboration with Louboutin's Fall/Winter 2020 Cube Collection.

In early 2021, she issued her first singles of the year, "Astronaut", and "Curled In", both accompanied by a music video.

On 16 April 2021, Lynch released her sophomore EP, "Antihero", containing her four previous singles as well as one new track.

On 8 October 2021, she released "Who Died and Made You King?". Later that month, it was announced that she would be competing in Australia Decides 2022, later revealed to be with her 2022 single "Little Fires". She won the jury vote placing 3rd overall.

Jaguar Jonze released her album "Bunny Mode" on 3 June 2022. A survivor of sexual assault, Jonze described writing "Bunny Mode" as a "cathartic process".

Her 2024 album, "Victim Impact Statement", was a response to the 2019 sexual assault by two music producers, and her resulting #MeToo advocacy. In that year, Paul de Zubicaray painted her portrait, You can’t hurt me anymore, and entered it for the Archibald Prize.

=== 2026+: Beastmaster ===
In August 2026, Jonze announced Beastmaster would be released in January 2027.

== Health ==
Her 2022 album, "Bunny Mode", was a public response to her childhood sexual and physical abuse and the resulting post-traumatic stress disorder (PTSD).

In February 2024, Lynch was diagnosed with Functional Neurological Disorder (FND) and Systemic Lupus Erythematosus (SLE). She lost control of her arms and legs, and experienced chronic pain and seizures.

== Freediving ==
As part of her path to recovery, Lynch took up freediving. In 2025 she represented Australia in the AIDA 35th Freediving World Championships. During the event, she dived to 51 metres. As of 1 May 2026, she was ranked 9th in Australia for free immersion apnea (FIM), constant weight bi-fins (CWTB) and constant weight without fins (CNF), and 344th overall worldwide.

== Discography ==
=== Studio albums ===
Title	Details
Lone Wolf	Released: 2012; Label: Independent; Format: Digital Download, Streaming, Physical
Black Cat	Released: 2015; Label: Independent (DEENA008); Format: Digital Download, Streaming, Physical
Bunny Mode	Released: 3 June 2022; Label: Nettwerk; Format: Digital Download, Streaming, Physical
Beast Master	Released: 29 January 2027; Label: Nettwerk; Format:

=== Extended plays ===
Title	Details
Diamonds & Liquid Gold	Released: 17 April 2020; Label: Nettwerk; Format: Digital Download, Streaming, Physical
Antihero	Released: 16 April 2021; Label: Nettwerk; Format: Digital Download, Streaming, Physical
Victim Impact Statement	Released: 23 February 2024; Label: Jaguar Jonze, Nettwerk; Format: Digital Download, Streaming

=== Singles ===
==== As lead artist ====
List of singles as lead artist showing year released and album name
Title	Year	Album
Credited as Jaguar Jonze
"You Got Left Behind"	2018	Diamonds & Liquid Gold
"Beijing Baby"	2019	Diamonds & Liquid Gold
"Kill Me With Your Love"	2019	Diamonds & Liquid Gold
"Rabbit Hole"	2020	Diamonds & Liquid Gold
"Toxic"	2020	Non-album singles
"Deadalive"	2020	Antihero
"Murder"	2020	Antihero
"Astronaut"	2021	Antihero
"Curled In"	2021	Antihero
"Who Died and Made You King?" (solo or featuring Shungudzo)	2021	Bunny Mode
"Cut"	2022	Bunny Mode
"Little Fires"	2022	Bunny Mode
"Trigger Happy"	2022	Bunny Mode
"Punchline"	2022	Bunny Mode
"Swallow"	2022	Bunny Mode
"Angry, Angry" (with Haru Nemuri)	2023	TBA
"Whiplash"	2024	Victim Impact Statement
"Naked"	2026	Beast Master
"Half Devil" (with Kire Turn)	2026	Beast Master
"Kawasaki Ninja"	2026	Beast Master
"Right Side Up"	2026	Beast Master

==== As featured artist ====
List of singles as lead artist, with selected chart positions and certifications, showing year released and album name
Title	Year	Album
"Heart-Shaped Box" (Triple J Like a Version) (Hermitude featuring Jaguar Jonze)	2019	Non-album singles
"You Can't Hurt Me Anymore" (Kate Miller-Heidke featuring Jaguar Jonze)	2022	Child in Reverse (Deluxe edition)

=== Videography ===
Title	Year	Director(s)
Credited as Jaguar Jonze
As lead artist
"You Got Left Behind"	2018	Benjamin Wright & Giovanna Gonzalez
"Beijing Baby"	2019	Ben Gerbanas
"Kill Me With Your Love"	2019	Ash Lim
"Rabbit Hole"	2020	Ribal Hosn & Jaguar Jonze
"Rising Sun"	2020	Ribal Hosn & Jaguar Jonze
"Diamonds & Liquid Gold"	2020	Ribal Hosn & Jaguar Jonze
"Toxic"	2020	Ribal Hosn & Jaguar Jonze
"Deadalive"	2020	Ribal Hosn & Jaguar Jonze
"Murder"	2020	Ribal Hosn & Jaguar Jonze
"Astronaut"	2021	Natalie Sim
"Curled In"	2021	Ribal Hosn & Jaguar Jonze
"Tessellations"	2021	Ribal Hosn & Jaguar Jonze
"Who Died and Made You King?"	2021	Jaguar Jonze
"Cut"	2022	Jaguar Jonze
"Little Fires"	2022	Jaguar Jonze
"Trigger Happy"	2022	Jaguar Jonze
"Punchline"	2022	Jaguar Jonze
Guest appearance
"You Can't Hurt Me Anymore" (Kate Miller-Heidke featuring Jaguar Jonze)	2022	Joshua Tate

== Awards and nominations ==
=== AIR Awards ===
The Australian Independent Record Awards (commonly known informally as AIR Awards) is an annual awards night to recognise, promote and celebrate the success of Australia's Independent Music sector.

Year	Nominee / work	Award	Result	Ref.
2021	Deena Lynch (Jaguar Jonze)	2021 Outstanding Achievement Award	awarded	
2022	"Who Died and Made You King?"	Independent Song of the Year	Nominated	

=== J Awards ===
The J Awards are an annual series of Australian music awards that were established by the Australian Broadcasting Corporation's youth-focused radio station Triple J. They commenced in 2005.

Year	Nominee / work	Award	Result	Ref.
2020	Jaguar Jonze	Unearthed Artist of the Year	Nominated	
2021	Jaguar Jonze	You Done Good Award	Won	

=== National Live Music Awards ===
The National Live Music Awards (NLMAs) commenced in 2016 to recognise contributions to the live music industry in Australia.

Year	Nominee / work	Award	Result	Ref.
2023	Jaguar Jonze	Best Live Act in QLD	Nominated	
2023	Jaguar Jonze	Best Live Voice in QLD	Nominated	

=== Queensland Music Awards ===
The Queensland Music Awards (previously known as Q Song Awards) are annual awards celebrating Queensland, Australia's brightest emerging artists and established legends. They commenced in 2006.

Year	Nominee / work	Award	Result (wins only)
2020	Jaguar Jonze	Singer / Songwriter	Won
2021	Jaguar Jonze	Singer / Songwriter	Won

=== Rolling Stone Australia Awards ===
The Rolling Stone Australia Awards are awarded annually in January or February by the Australian edition of Rolling Stone magazine for outstanding contributions to popular culture in the previous year.

Year	Nominee / work	Award	Result	Ref.
2021	Jaguar Jonze	Best New Artist	Nominated	
