= Nick de la Hoyde =

- Origin: Sydney, Australia
- Genres: Hip hop; pop; R&B
- Occupations: Singer; songwriter; rapper
- Years active: 2014–present
- Website: Official website

Nick de la Hoyde is an Australian singer, songwriter, and rapper from Sydney. He has released several singles and one EP.

== Early life ==
Nick de la Hoyde was born and grew up in Sydney, Australia. At age 15, he moved to Barcelona to pursue a soccer career. He began creating music during this time before eventually moving back to Australia and switching over to music full-time.

== Career ==
De la Hoyde released his first single, "The Longest Way," in 2014. His YouTube videos had attracted the attention of Chicago-based producer, Lemoyne Alexander, who produced the song. "The Longest Way" peaked at number 4 on the Mediabase Top 40 Pop Independent Artists chart. In June 2015, de la Hoyde released his first EP, Passion, which included the songs "The Longest Way," "Aces," and "By My Side."

He would go on to release a single, "Changing," in December 2015 followed by the release of "Never Gonna Beg For It" in April 2016. He would later release an EP of remixes of "Never Gonna Beg For It" that included producers, RIDDLER, Zuzu, SERAFIN, and Kids On Bridges. In September 2016, he released another single, "Thinking Bout You."

In 2017, he released the single "Love Takes Time" which was accompanied by a video directed by Bruno Kataoka. He closed out the year with the release of "Hold Me Close."

== Discography ==
=== EPs ===
List of EPs with selected album details
Title	Details
Passion	Released: 30 June 2015; Label: Gatcombe Records; Formats: Digital download

=== Singles ===
List of singles showing year released and album name
Title	Year	Album
"The Longest Way"	2014	Passion
"By My Side"	2015	Passion
"Changing"	2015	Non-album single
"Never Gonna Beg for It"	2016	Non-album single
"Thinking Bout You"	2016	Non-album single
"Love Takes Time"	2017	Non-album single
"Enemy"	2017	Non-album single
"Hold Me Close"	2017	Non-album single
"Mirror Mirror"	2018	Non-album single
"Thru 2 U" (with Auralantic)	2018	Non-album single
"California"	2019	Non-album single
"Animals"	2019	Non-album single
"Ghost"	2019	Non-album single
"High"	2019	Non-album single
"In2" (with Zu/Zu)	2019	Non-album single
"Me"	2019	Non-album single
"Firestarter" (with Auralantic)	2019	Non-album single
"Forever Young"	2020	Non-album single
"Lay Low"	2020	Non-album single
"In My Head" (with Auralantic)	2020	Non-album single
"Touch" (with Hoved)	2020	Non-album single
"Devil"	2020	Non-album single
"Falling"	2020	Non-album single
"Night Stuff"	2020	Non-album single
