= Seann Miley Moore =

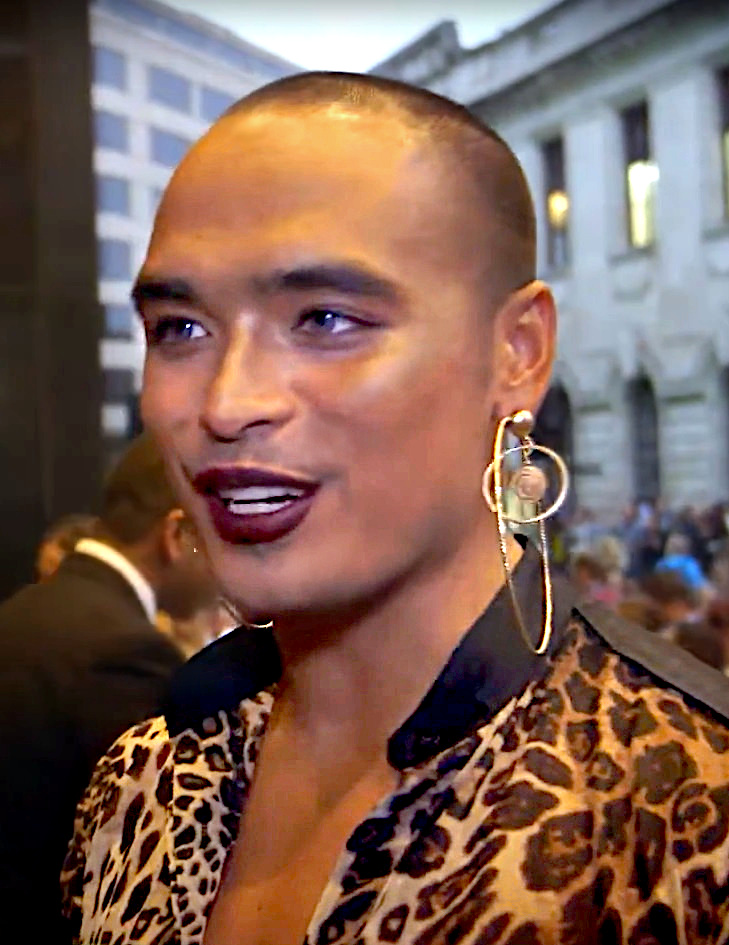
- Miley Moore at Wicked 10th Birthday 2016

Background information
- Born: Jakarta, Indonesia
- Genres: R&B, soul
- Occupation: Singer
- Instrument: Vocals
- Years active: 2015–present
- Website: seannmileymoore.com

Seann Miley Moore is a Filipino-Australian singer, known for his roles as the Engineer in multiple tours of Miss Saigon and Hedwig in the 2025 Australian Tour of Hedwig and the Angry Inch, as well as competing in season 12 of The X-Factor, UK and in season 10 of The Voice, Australia.

== Career ==
In 2015, Moore competed in season 12 of the X-Factor UK at the age of 25 and was the fourth contestant eliminated.

In 2017, he released his first EP called “Seann Miley Moore”, that consisted of four songs. He released his second EP, “4 Track Bitch” in 2018.

In 2021, he competed in season 10 of The Voice Australia on Jessica Mauboy's team, he turned all four chairs in his blind audition where he performed The Prayer by Andrea Bocelli. That led him to compete as one of the artists at Eurovision: Australia Decides 2022 with his song “My Body”.

In 2023 Moore played The Engineer in Miss Saigon in Australia, the Philippines, Taiwan and Singapore, and will reprise the role in the upcoming 2025-26 UK-Ireland Regional Tour. In 2025, Moore is playing Hedwig in a new Australian tour of Hedwig and the Angry Inch.

== Personal life ==
He was born in Jakarta. In 2003, he moved to Australia with his family. In his teenage years, he came out as gay. In 2015, he came out as genderqueer.

Moore uses he/she/they pronouns.

== Discography ==
=== Extended plays ===
Title	Year
Seann Miley Moore	2017
4 Track Bitch	2018

=== Singles ===
Title	Year	Album
"Life on Mars"	2015	The X Factor
"This Woman's Work"	2015	The X Factor
"The Show Must Go On"	2015	The X Factor
"California Dreamin' "	2015	The X Factor
"San Miguel"	2018	4 Track Bitch
"Lonely"	2021	Lonely (The Voice)
"My Body"	2022	My Body
