= Not the Same (song) =

2022 song by Sheldon Riley

Single by Sheldon Riley
- Released: 15 February 2022
- Length: 2:58
- Label: Self-released
- Songwriters: Sheldon Riley; Cam Nacson; Timi Temple
- Producer: Cameron Nacson

Sheldon Riley singles chronology
"Again" (2021)	"Not the Same" (2022)	"Never Enough" (2022)

Live video
- "Not the Same" on YouTube

Eurovision Song Contest 2022 entry
- Country: Australia
- Artist: Sheldon Riley
- Composers: Sheldon Riley; Cam Nacson; Timi Temple
- Lyricists: Sheldon Riley; Cam Nacson; Timi Temple

Finals performance
- Semi-final result: 2nd
- Semi-final points: 243
- Final result: 15th
- Final points: 125

Entry chronology
- ◄ "Technicolour" (2021)
- "Promise" (2023) ►

Official performance videos
- "Not the Same" (second semi-final) on YouTube "Not the Same" (grand final) on YouTube

"Not the Same" is a song by Australian singer Sheldon Riley, released as a single on 15 February 2022. It represented Australia at the Eurovision Song Contest 2022, held in Turin, Italy, in May 2022. The song was co-written by Riley with Cam Nacson and Timi Temple and produced by Nacson, and is about "discrimination and exclusion". The song details his experiences with autism.

Following its win at Eurovision – Australia Decides, the song debuted at number 3 on the Australian Independent Label Singles chart.

== Background ==
The song was submitted for the 2022 edition of the annual song competition Eurovision – Australia Decides, which selects Australia's representative for the Eurovision Song Contest, broadcast by the Special Broadcasting Service (SBS) on 26 February 2022. "Not the Same" came second in both the jury vote and televote, but achieved the most total points, winning the competition.

Riley wrote the lyrics in late 2015 about his experiences growing up, including being diagnosed with Asperger syndrome at age six, living in public housing, and "moving from home to home, unaware of [his] sexuality, among a deeply religious family". Speaking about the track, Sheldon said, "'Not The Same' is the story I never thought I'd ever feel I'd be able to tell. Written from the memories of a child who at age 6 was diagnosed with Asperger syndrome, growing up in public housing, moving from home to home, unaware of my sexuality, among a deeply religious family. A path already laid that I would never be able to properly understand or interact with other people. I actually wrote this song back around late 2015, I had sent myself the lyrics on my old Facebook account. It was more of a poem back then though, reflecting on how far I had come, recently having come out to my family and feeling so free to speak my mind more and more each day. I have always connected to Darker Disney Animations, characters that were perceived to be different, evil, misunderstood and weren't given a chance to explain parts of themselves that they ultimately couldn't change. Maleficent, Cruella DeVille, Ursula. It probably explains my dark aesthetic... The song is really a gift back to any one who might be in my position when I first fell in love with Eurovision. Regardless of gender, sexuality, race, financial position, trauma, color, age, shape or size. You're 'Not the Same' but you're not alone."

== Reception ==
Calum Rowe from Sparks Underland wrote that the song "gives Australia a Eurovision entry to be proud of." Rowe said, "The vulnerability of Riley's vocals are evident from second zero of the track. It's so pure to hear someone lay bare their talent in such a raw and emotional way. A moody piano guides the song from start to finish at a volume just high enough to enjoy and just low enough not to engulf Riley. The strings that appear in the middle eight are used in a similar way. The final 30 seconds of the track are split in two which seems like a mistake. The first 15 show Riley's voice at its most naked with the last 15 containing instrumentation that swamps the song in an attempt to top the natural crescendo the track had in the middle eight. 'Not the Same' really is a fine composition. Tidy up the unnatural ending and he'll be onto something."

Michael James from Q News felt that "Deep, rich and powerful vocals are the initial standout of this track. Sheldon's emotive and powerful story is equal to the strength of his voice. Every moment of the song carries the listener on a journey as the song builds to its climax. Rich with character, style and story 'Not the Same' is the perfect Eurovision track."

== At Eurovision ==
Riley performed eighth out of the 18 acts in the second semi-final of the Eurovision Song Contest on 12 May 2022.

== Charts ==
Chart performance for "Not the Same"
Chart (2022)	Peak position
Australia Digital Tracks (ARIA)	23
Australia Independent Label Singles (AIR)	3
Lithuania (AGATA)	47
Sweden Heatseeker (Sverigetopplistan)	19
