= Zero Gravity (Kate Miller-Heidke song) =

2019 song by Kate Miller-Heidke

Single by Kate Miller-Heidke
- Released: 25 January 2019
- Genre: Pop-opera
- Length: 2:57
- Label: Universal Music Australia
- Songwriters: Kate Miller-Heidke; Keir Nuttall; Julian Hamilton

Kate Miller-Heidke singles chronology
"You've Underestimated Me, Dude" (2016)	"Zero Gravity" (2019)	"Ernie" (2019)

Lyric video
- "Zero Gravity" on YouTube

Eurovision Song Contest 2019 entry
- Country: Australia
- Artist: Kate Miller-Heidke
- Language: English
- Composers: Kate Miller-Heidke; Keir Nuttall; Julian Hamilton
- Lyricists: Kate Miller-Heidke; Keir Nuttall

Finals performance
- Semi-final result: 1st
- Semi-final points: 261
- Final result: 9th
- Final points: 284

Entry chronology
- ◄ "We Got Love" (2018)
- "Don't Break Me" (2020) ►

Official performance videos
- "Zero Gravity" (first semi-final) on YouTube "Zero Gravity" (grand final) on YouTube

"Zero Gravity" is a song performed by Australian singer Kate Miller-Heidke. It was released as a single on 25 January 2019, and was Australia's entry in the Eurovision Song Contest 2019 after it won the jury and public vote on Eurovision – Australia Decides on 9 February 2019. In an interview with broadcaster SBS, Miller-Heidke said she has always known of Eurovision, but became more invested since Australia became involved. She said "I think what I love about Eurovision is the permission to go a bit bonkers and I love how it embraces all different genres and different levels of experimental music and performance. I love how theatrical it is."

The song was performed during the first Eurovision semi-final, in which Kate placed first with 261 points, on 14 May 2019, and qualified for the final. It finished in ninth place with 284 points. The performance featured the singer and two dancers atop large bendy poles, using their body weight to sway themselves through the air above the stage.

At the APRA Music Awards of 2020, the song was shortlisted for Song of the Year.

== Background ==
"Zero Gravity" has been called a pop-opera song. Miller-Heidke wrote the song following her experience with post-natal depression after the birth of her son, Ernie, and how she felt "weightless" as she recovered. "Miller-Heidke said "For me, after the birth of my son, Ernie, I went through a long period of feeling like I'd lost my identity and feeling very sort of foggy and down in a lot of ways, and it took a couple of years after he was born for me to feel like I was regaining my strength and clarity, and motivation, and a sense of who I was as well. And that was just an amazing feeling and so that's what this song tried to capture."

== Critical reception ==
auspOp reviewed the track, calling it "cute, danceable, quirky, edgy and just a little bit bonkers. It blends pop, dance and even opera and allows Kate to showcase her extraordinary vocal ability. So pretty perfect, it seems."

== Track listing ==
All tracks composed by Kate Miller-Heidke, Keir Nuttall and Julian Hamilton, with lyrics by Miller-Heidke and Nuttall.

1. "Zero Gravity" – 2:57
2. "Zero Gravity" (Acoustic) – 3:38
3. "Zero Gravity" (Radio Edit) – 2:39
4. "Zero Gravity" (7th Heaven Remix) – 3:55
5. "Zero Gravity" (Where It's ATT Remix) – 3:13
6. "Zero Gravity" (Donatachi Remix) – 2:59

== Charts ==
Chart (2019)	Peak position
Australia (ARIA)	95
Lithuania (AGATA)	64
Scotland Singles (OCC)	62
Sweden Heatseeker (Sverigetopplistan)	2
UK Singles Downloads (OCC)	57

== Release history ==
Region	Date	Release	Format	Label
Various	25 January 2019	Original	Digital download, streaming	Universal Music Australia
Various	19 April 2019	7th Heaven Remix	Digital download, streaming	Universal Music Australia
Various	19 April 2019	Where It's ATT Remix	Digital download, streaming	Universal Music Australia
Various	26 April 2019	Radio edit	Digital download, streaming	Universal Music Australia
Various	3 May 2019	Acoustic	Digital download, streaming	Universal Music Australia
Various	14 May 2019	EP	Digital download, streaming	Universal Music Australia
