= Bridget Hustwaite =

Australian radio presenter

- Born: 10 April 1991 (age 35); Ballarat, Victoria, Australia
- Education: Ballarat High School; Swinburne University
- Occupations: Radio presenter; journalist; author; health activist
- Years active: 2012–present
- Known for: Hosting of Good Nights on Triple J; endometriosis advocacy
- Website: www.bridget-hustwaite.com

Bridget Hustwaite (born 10 April 1991) is an Australian radio presenter, television presenter, journalist, author, and health activist.

Her debut book, How to Endo, which chronicles her experiences with endometriosis, was released on 2 March 2021.

== Early life and education ==
Bridget Hustwaite was born in Ballarat, Victoria, on 10 April 1991. Hustwaite grew up in Ballarat and in nearby Learmonth. She graduated from Ballarat High School in 2008, and then studied visual merchandising at the Swinburne University of Technology.

== Personal life ==
Hustwaite resides in Melbourne, Victoria after two years in Perth, Western Australia.

=== Health issues ===
Hustwaite was diagnosed with stage four endometriosis on 16 August 2018, following six years of suffering intense abdominal pain, nausea, and fatigue during her adolescent menstrual years. Speaking shortly after the diagnosis, Hustwaite stated:

"We need faster diagnosis, better treatments and more education and awareness about endometriosis. The fact [that] this research is being funded is a step in the right direction."

Hustwaite has used heat bags during her shifts on radio in order to minimise pain caused by the condition.

== Career ==
In 2012, Hustwaite was the runner-up in Channel V Australia's Presenter Search. She then began volunteering for music journalism website The AU Review as a concert reviewer, and at SYN Media in Melbourne. With SYN, a youth-run media organisation, Hustwaite presented the live music show 1700, which aired on television through C31 Melbourne. She went on to present radio shows The Hoist and Spotlight on SYN 90.7.

In late 2015, Hustwaite was offered the role of presenter on Triple J's mid-dawn program. She took over from Linda Marigliano as the host of Triple J's weeknight evening show Good Nights in 2018. On 9 May 2019, Hustwaite created an endometriosis-themed Instagram account, titled "Endogram", with the goal of raising awareness, sharing information and encouraging conversations about endometriosis. In early June, memes using puns based on Hustwaite's surname began to circulate on the Facebook group "Sultanaposting". Australian pop culture website Junkee labelled the memes "glorious". Following her endometriosis diagnosis, Hustwaite became an ambassador for Endometriosis Australia on 15 August. During the early stages of the COVID-19 pandemic in Australia in March 2020, she launched "Bridget Hustwaite's Saturday Night Stay In" on Instagram, a series of videos in which she interviewed Australian musicians and hosted a live acoustic performance from them. On 2 March 2021, Hustwaite released her debut book, How to Endo, which chronicles her experiences with her endometriosis diagnosis. On 11 May 2022, she was announced as a jury member for Australia's entry in the Eurovision Song Contest 2022.

== Professional work ==
=== Filmography ===
List of television appearances, with year released and role shown
Year	Title	Role	Notes	Ref.
2020	The Sound	Herself	Co-host role; seven episodes	

=== Podcasts ===
List of podcasts, with year released and role shown
Year	Title	Role	Notes	Ref.
2018	Hack	Herself	Guest appearance; one episode	
2021	Jeans and a Nice Top	Herself	Guest appearance; one episode	
2021	The Hook-Up	Herself	Guest appearance; one episode	
2021	Life Uncut	Herself	Guest appearance; one episode	

=== Published works ===
- Hustwaite, Bridget (2 March 2021). How to Endo. Allen & Unwin. ISBN 978-1-76-087908-2.
- Hustwaite, Bridget (7 January 2025). Figuring Out Thirty. Penguin Random House Australia. ISBN 978-1-76134-486-2
