= Andrew Lambrou =

Australian singer (born 1998)

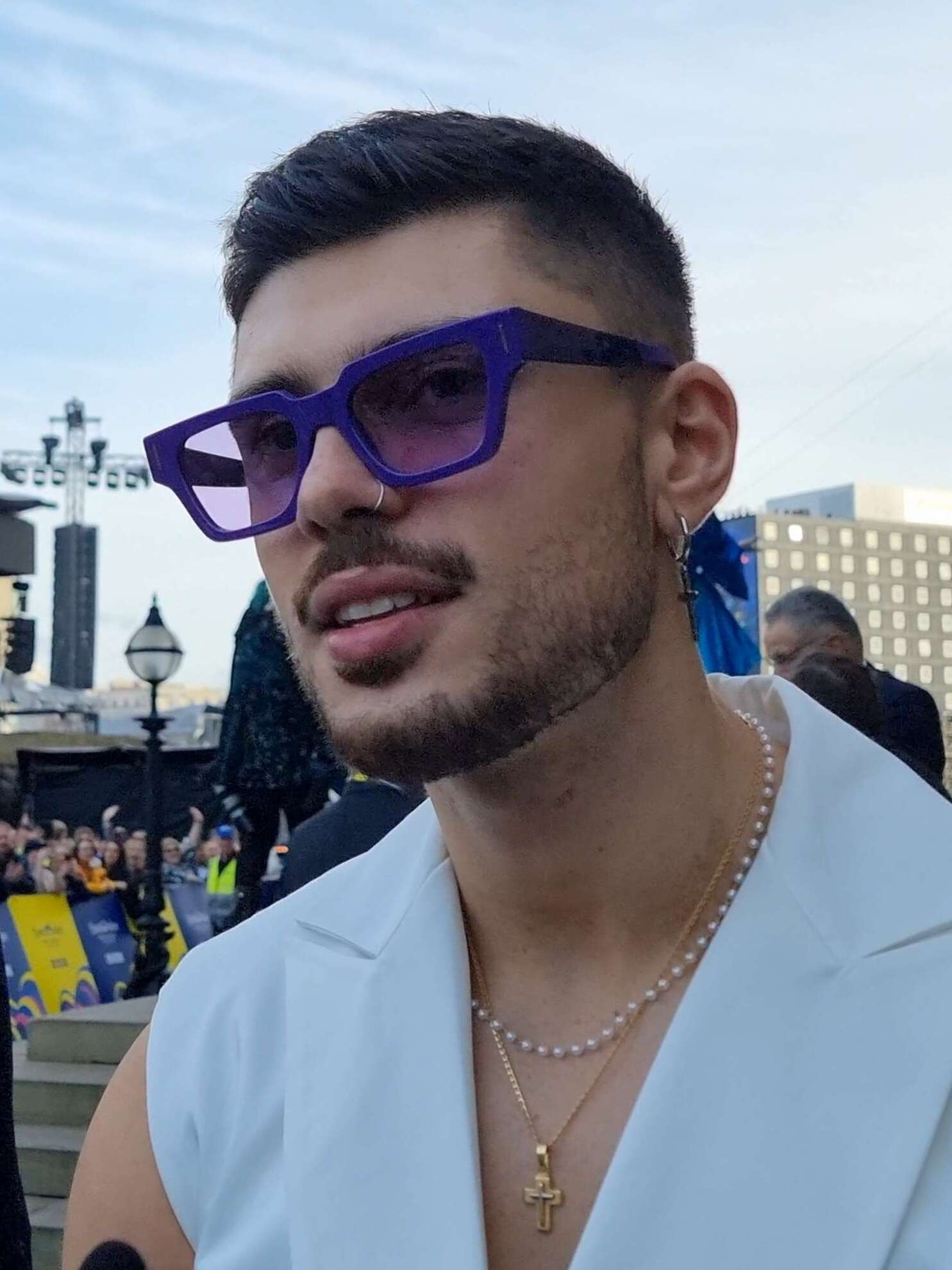
- Lambrou in 2023
- Born: Andrew Harry Lambrou; 25 May 1998 (age 28); Sydney, New South Wales, Australia
- Occupations: Singer; songwriter
- Years active: 2013–present
- Musical career
- Genres: Pop
- Labels: City Pop; Panik
- Website: andrewlambroumusic.com

Andrew Harry Lambrou (/ˈlæmbruː/ LAM-broo; Greek: Άντριου Λάμπρου; born 25 May 1998) is an Australian singer-songwriter. He represented Cyprus in the Eurovision Song Contest 2023.

== Early life ==
Lambrou was born in Sydney to a Greek Cypriot family. One of his grandfathers is from Paphos, Cyprus, while he also has roots from the island of Lemnos, Greece.

At the age of five, Lambrou won first place in an eisteddfod, singing "Do-Re-Mi" from The Sound of Music. The same year, his mother enrolled him in music school, realising he had a musical inclination.

== Career ==
=== 2013–2020: Career beginnings and The X Factor ===
Lambrou first gained attention in 2013 after uploading a cover of Evanescence's "My Immortal" to YouTube. A 15-second cover of Sam Smith's "Stay With Me" uploaded onto Instagram was shared by a music page in Spain and earned Lambrou over 2,000 followers overnight.

In 2015 Lambrou took part in the seventh season of The X Factor Australia. He was eliminated after the super home visits, just prior to the live shows, placing him in the top 20.

The X Factor performances and results (2015)
Episode	Song	Original Artist	Result
Audition	"Chains"	Nick Jonas	Through to bootcamp
Bootcamp and five seat challenge	"Ain't Nobody"	Rufus & Chaka Khan	Through to super home visits
Super home visits	"Start Again"	Conrad Sewell	Eliminated

After years of posting his viral covers, Lambrou transitioned to writing music of his own building up his ever-growing fan base. He was noticed by Sony ATV and was signed by Maree Hamblion in 2017. This allowed Andrew to develop his own musical ability and collaborate with other artists.

=== 2021–present: Eurovision – Australia Decides and Eurovision 2023 ===
In early 2021, Lambrou signed with Sydney-based label City Pop Records and released his debut single "Throne". In a feature, Australian Independent Record Labels Association called the song "a dark and compelling debut that sees the young singer-songwriter signalling his arrival as an up-and-coming pop heavyweight."

In July 2021, Lambrou released "Lemonade" to which Lambrou said "[it] represents knowing that good is around the corner, and that the perfect person is out there for everyone."

On 24 September 2021, Lambrou released his third single, "Confidence". Speaking of the track, Lambrou said, "'Confidence' is about finding a new confidence in yourself when partnered with the right person. Sometimes that special someone can bring the best out of you, and when you both provide the same feeling for each other, it's feels unmatchable".

In February 2022, Lambrou competed in Eurovision – Australia Decides with the song "Electrify". Lambrou said "The song wants to convey this 'magical' moment that you feel when you meet someone and 'electrifies' you, makes you believe that you have acquired super powers." He earned 51 points and finished in 7th place.

On 17 October 2022, Cyprus Broadcasting Corporation (CyBC) announced that Lambrou would represent Cyprus in the Eurovision Song Contest 2023. In the same month, Lambrou signed with Panik Records, the leading label in both Greece and Cyprus, with whom the CyBC maintains an agreement for the Eurovision Song Contest entry and for future releases.

On 2 March 2023, Lambrou released his Eurovision entry, "Break a Broken Heart".

== Discography ==
=== Studio albums ===
List of studio albums, with selected details
Title	Details
All of Me Loves All of You	Released: 12 September 2016; Formats: Streaming

=== Singles ===
List of singles, showing year released with selected chart positions and originating album
Title	Year	Peak chart positions					Album
Title	Year	AUS digital	FIN	LTU	SWE Heat.	UK	Album
"Throne"	2021	—	—	—	—	—	Non-album singles
"Lemonade"	2021	—	—	—	—	—	Non-album singles
"Confidence"	2021	—	—	—	—	—	Non-album singles
"Electrify"	2022	—	—	—	—	—	Non-album singles
"Break a Broken Heart"	2023	29	42	26	6	92	Non-album singles
"Take My Breath Away"	2023	—	—	—	—	—	Non-album singles
"90 Days of Snow"	2026	—	—	—	—	—	Non-album singles
"—" denotes a recording that did not chart or was not released in that territory.

Awards and achievements
Preceded by Andromache with "Ela"	Cyprus in the Eurovision Song Contest; 2023	Succeeded by Silia Kapsis with "Liar"
