= Technicolour (song) =

2021 song by Montaigne

Single by Montaigne
- Released: 5 March 2021
- Length: 2:49
- Label: Wonderlick
- Songwriters: Jessica Cerro; Dave Hammer
- Producer: Dave Hammer

Montaigne singles chronology
"Don't Break Me" (2020)	"Technicolour" (2021)	"My Life Is Better with You" (2021)

Music video
- "Technicolour" on YouTube

Eurovision Song Contest 2021 entry
- Country: Australia
- Artist: Montaigne
- Composers: Jessica Cerro; Dave Hammer
- Lyricists: Jessica Cerro; Dave Hammer

Finals performance
- Semi-final result: 14th
- Semi-final points: 28

Entry chronology
- ◄ "Don't Break Me" (2020)
- "Not the Same" (2022) ►

Official performance video
- "Technicolour" (first semi-final) on YouTube

"Technicolour" is a song by Australian singer-songwriter Montaigne. The song represented Australia in the Eurovision Song Contest 2021 in Rotterdam, the Netherlands, after being internally selected by the national broadcaster Special Broadcasting Service (SBS). Montaigne co-wrote the song with songwriter and producer Dave Hammer. Montaigne stated that the song "makes you want to cry, makes you want to dance, makes you want to take on a malignant corporate power". The song did not qualify for the final.

== Music video ==
A music video was released on 5 May 2021 on Montaigne's YouTube channel. The video was directed by Courtney Brookes and produced by Eight Productions. Dancers Chantelle Landayan, Lorcan Power, Andrew Huynh, and Kirsten Willis were all featured in the music video.

== Eurovision Song Contest ==
=== Internal selection ===
On 2 April 2020, SBS announced Australian singer-songwriter Montaigne as the country's representative for the Eurovision Song Contest 2021.

=== At Eurovision ===
The 65th edition of the Eurovision Song Contest took place in Rotterdam, the Netherlands and consisted of two semi-finals on 18 May and 20 May 2021, and a grand final on 22 May 2021. According to the Eurovision rules, all participating countries, except the host nation and the "Big Five", consisting of France, Germany, Italy, Spain and the United Kingdom, were required to qualify from one of two semi-finals to compete for the final, with the top 10 countries from their respective semi-final progressing to the grand final. On 17 November 2020, it was announced that Australia would be performing in the first half of the first semi-final of the contest. The song did not progress to the final.

== Charts ==
Chart performance for "Technicolour"
Chart (2021)	Peak position
Lithuania (AGATA)	42
Netherlands (Single Tip 30)	29
