= Sheldon Riley =

Australian singer (born 1999)

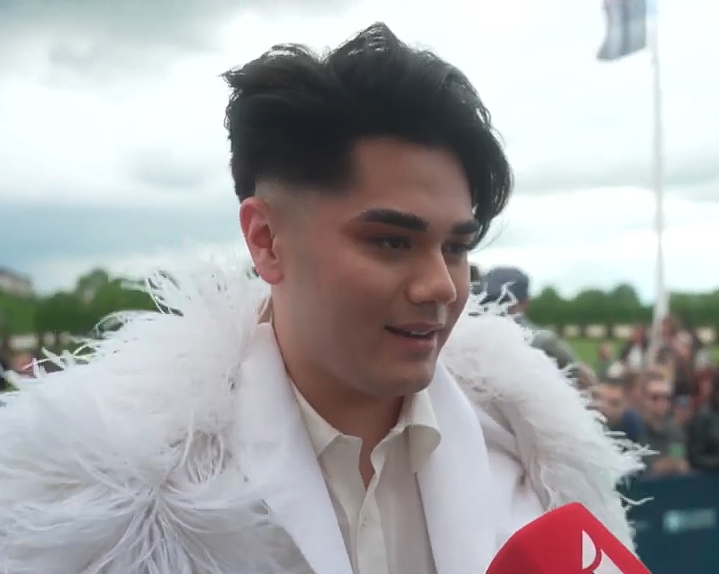
- Riley in 2022

Background information
- Born: Sheldon Riley Hernandez; 14 March 1999 (age 27); Sydney, Australia
- Genres: Pop, folk
- Occupation: Singer
- Instrument: Vocals
- Years active: 2016–present

Sheldon Riley Hernandez (born 14 March 1999) is an Australian singer. He represented Australia in the Eurovision Song Contest 2022 with his song "Not the Same". He first appeared as a contestant on the eighth season of The X Factor Australia. Riley later competed on the seventh season of The Voice Australia, and in 2020, he appeared on America's Got Talent for its fifteenth season, and was brought back by the judges in 2024 as one of the top 40 all-time Got Talent performers to compete in the America's Got Talent: Fantasy League during which he was advanced by fan voting to the semi-finals.

== Early life ==
Riley was born in Sydney, to an Australian mother and a Filipino father. He moved to the Gold Coast at a young age where he grew up and attended Palm Beach Currumbin State High School throughout his upbringing.

== Career ==
=== 2016–2020: The X Factor, The Voice, and America's Got Talent ===
In 2016, Riley, who then performed under his full name Sheldon Hernandez, auditioned for the eighth season of The X Factor Australia with the songs "Circle of Life" by Elton John and "Ordinary People" by John Legend. He originally participated in the 14–21s category, which was mentored by Adam Lambert, and was eliminated as a solo artist at the bootcamp stage of the competition. Riley returned to The X Factor after the mentor of the groups category, Iggy Azalea, selected him to be a part of a new boy band of eliminated solo artists. The band was called "Time and Place" and its members, in addition to Sheldon, included Sami Afuni, Matthew McNaught, and Leon Kroeber. The group was selected as one of Iggy Azalea's three acts, moving on to the live shows following the three-chair challenge. They were eliminated in the first week of the live shows.

The X Factor performances and results (2016)
Episode	Song	Original Artist	Result
Audition	"Circle of Life" / "Ordinary People"	Elton John / John Legend	Through to bootcamp
Bootcamp	—N/a		Eliminated
Bootcamp	"You Don't Know Love" (as part of Time and Place)	Olly Murs	Through to live show
Live show 1	"Ride" (as part of Time and Place)	Twenty One Pilots	Eliminated

In 2018, Riley appeared in the seventh season of The Voice Australia. He auditioned with the song "Do You Really Want to Hurt Me" by Culture Club. All of the four judges turned their chairs and Riley chose Boy George to be his coach. Riley made it to the final of the show and finished in third place.

The Voice performances and results (2018)
Episode	Song	Original Artist	Result
Audition	"Do You Really Want to Hurt Me"	Culture Club	Through to The Knockouts
The Knockouts	"Believe"	Cher	Through to Battle Rounds
Battle Rounds	"Diamonds"	Rihanna	Through to live shows
Live show 1	"Creep"	Radiohead	Saved by public
Live show 2	"Scars to Your Beautiful"	Alessia Cara	Saved by public
Live show 3	"Born This Way"	Lady Gaga	Saved by public
Semi-final	"Rise"	Katy Perry	Saved by public
Final	"Young and Beautiful"	Lana Del Rey	3rd place
Final	"Sweet Dreams (Are Made of This)" (with Boy George)	Eurythmics	3rd place

Immediately following the final, Sheldon released "Fire" via Universal Music Australia.

In 2019, Riley returned to The Voice to compete in its eighth season as an all-star contestant. Riley auditioned with "Frozen" by Madonna and received chair turns from both eligible coaches. He chose Delta Goodrem as his coach. He was eliminated in the semi-final of the show.

The Voice performances and results (2019)
Episode	Song	Original Artist	Result
Audition	"Frozen"	Madonna	Through to The Knockouts
The Knockouts	"Call Out My Name"	The Weeknd	Through to Battle Rounds
Battle Rounds	"Praying"	Kesha	Through to live shows
Live show 1	"Everybody Wants to Rule the World"	Tears for Fears	Saved by Coach
Live show 2	"7 Rings"	Ariana Grande	Saved by Public
Semi-final	"The Show Must Go On"	Queen	Eliminated

In 2020, Riley competed in the fifteenth season of America's Got Talent. He auditioned with the song "Idontwannabeyouanymore" by Billie Eilish. He was eliminated in the third quarter-final of the season.

=== 2021–present: Eurovision Song Contest, The Masked Singer, and American Idol ===
On 26 November 2021, he was announced as one of the participants in the Eurovision – Australia Decides. Later, it was announced that his song for the contest was called "Not the Same", which released on 15 February 2022. He won the show with 100 points and therefore had the chance to represent Australia in the Eurovision Song Contest 2022 in Turin. Riley was one of the 10 qualifiers that advanced to the final of the competition on 14 May, where he reached 15th place with 125 points. Of the points he received, 123 were from national juries, and 2 points were from televoting.

In 2022, Riley placed runner-up in the fourth season of The Masked Singer as "Snapdragon". Riley later released a cover of "Never Enough", the song that he sang on the grand final.

In 2024, Riley appeared on America's Got Talent: Fantasy League on Mel B's team. He progressed to the semi-finals after the studio audience advanced him after the first round, but was eliminated during his semi-final episode.

In 2026, Riley auditioned for the twenty-fourth season of American Idol. He received three "yes" votes from the show's judges (Luke Bryan, Carrie Underwood, and Lionel Richie). He progressed to the "'Ohana Round" (Top 30) before being eliminated.

== Personal life ==
Riley is openly gay. He was diagnosed with autism at age six. As of 2021, he resides in Melbourne.

== Discography ==
=== Singles ===
List of singles as lead artist, with selected chart positions
Title	Year	Peak chart positions			Album
Title	Year	AUS Ind.	LIT	SWE Heat.	Album
"Fire"	2018	—	—	—	Non-album singles
"More Than I"	2020	—	—	—	Non-album singles
"Left Broken"	2021	—	—	—	Non-album singles
"Again"	2021	—	—	—	Non-album singles
"Not the Same"	2022	3	47	19	Non-album singles
"Never Enough"	2022	—	—	—	Non-album singles
"Insane"	2023	—	—	—	Non-album singles

Preceded by Montaigne with "Technicolour"	Australia in the Eurovision Song Contest; 2022	Succeeded by Voyager with "Promise"
