= Myf Warhurst =

Australian broadcaster (born 1973)

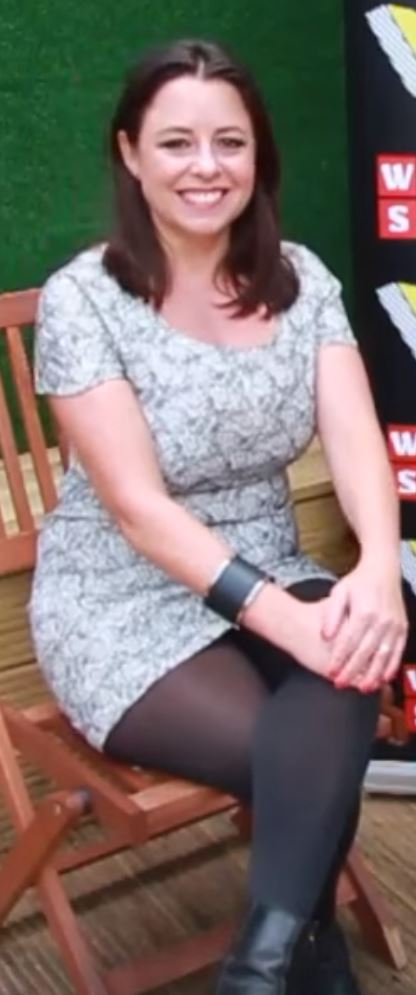
- Warhurst at the Edinburgh Festival Fringe 2013
- Born: Myfanwy Warhurst; 1973 (age 52–53); Portland, Victoria, Australia
- Occupations: Radio and television host
- Years active: 1997−present
- Presenting career
- Show: Spicks and Specks; Eurovision Song Contest
- Stations: Triple J; Triple M; ABC Local Radio; Double J
- Network: Australian Broadcasting Corporation

Myfanwy Warhurst (/mɪfænwiː/, born 1973) is an Australian radio announcer and television personality, best known for her work at Triple J radio station and on ABC Television's long-running music-themed quiz show Spicks and Specks. From 2017 to 2024, she served as Australia's commentator for the Eurovision Song Contest alongside Joel Creasey, and as co-host of the weekly podcast Bang On. She also provides the voices of Aunt Trixie and Indy's Mum in the Australian animated show Bluey.

== Early life and education ==
Myfanwy Warhurst was born in Portland, Victoria, in 1973. She has three older brothers, Shaun, Kit and Andre. Shaun had a significant role in initially encouraging her interests, ultimately leading her into the industry. Kit plays drums in the band Rocket Science. Warhurst's family moved to Donald in central Victoria when she was a child, then to Red Cliffs in northwest Victoria when she was eight years old.

Warhurst studied music and fine arts at Melbourne University.

== Career ==
Before her career as a radio announcer and TV personality, Warhurst was editor-in-chief of Melbourne street press magazine Inpress.

=== Radio and podcasting ===
Working as a radio announcer at Triple J, Warhurst came to the attention of the station's audience through short bi-weekly segments for Merrick and Rosso's Drive program in 2000. In 2001, Warhurst began hosting the Net 50 request program on Saturday nights, and in 2003, came to prominence as host of the weekday Lunch shift and her daily segment The Trashy Lunchtime Quiz. In January 2007 she joined Jay and the Doctor in hosting The Breakfast Show as Myf, Jay and the Doctor.

It was announced in October 2007 that she would leave Triple J and co-host a new breakfast show with comedian Peter Helliar and take over the Triple M Melbourne breakfast spot from The Cage, who finished up in November 2007.

In 2020 Warhurst presented history podcast series Our Place for independent network Litmus Media.

As of October 2022 Warhurst is co-host, with Zan Rowe, of the weekly podcast Bang On, "about music, art, life and stuff". Produced by Double J, Bang On won Best Host at the 2024 Australian Podcast Awards.

=== Television ===
Warhurst appeared on ABC1 in June 2012 with a six-part series, Myf Warhurst's Nice.

Warhurst has captained a team on music quiz show Spicks and Specks from its inception in 2005 until it finished its initial run in 2011, and again after its resumption with special episodes beginning in 2018, and as a full-time show in 2021.

Her other television work has included hosting triple j tv and the December 2006 special My Favourite Album.

She was a regular presenter on The Project.

From 2017 to 2022, Warhurst, along with Joel Creasey, was announced as one of Australia's commentators for Eurovision - Australia Decides, the local broadcast of the Eurovision Song Contest. Warhurst also appeared as a guest quiz master on Have You Been Paying Attention?.

Since 2018, she has voiced the animated characters of Aunt Trixie and Indy's Mum, in the ABC Kids television program Bluey.

In 2023, she hosted Meet the Neighbours for SBS TV and Blackfella Films.

In 2024, she hosted a series on ABC TV and ABC iview called The Truth about Menopause. In 2025, she appeared as a contestant on Claire Hooper's House Of Games.

Warhurst appeared as guest host on ABC documentary series Back Roads in 2025, presenting two episodes for the show's 11th season.

=== Writing ===
In 2022, Warhurst published her memoir Time of My Life.

== Guest appearances ==
Warhurst has occasionally appeared on Rove, and was a special presenter on RMITV's The Loft Live.

In January 2020, Warhurst participated in the sixth season of the Australian version of I'm a Celebrity...Get Me Out of Here!.

She was the focus of the second episode of season 13 of the Australian version of Who Do You Think You Are?, first aired on 28 June 2022, revealing a connection to iconic Australian musician John Farnham.

In August 2022, Warhurst was interviewed by Virginia Trioli on radio, in which she talked about receiving training to become a foster parent.

In October 2022, she appeared on Fran Kelly's TV show Frankly.

In 2023, Warhurst appeared as the narrator in The Rocky Horror Picture Show alongside Jason Donovan.

== Awards ==
Spicks and Specks twice won the Logies' Most Outstanding Light Entertainment Program.

The irreverent TV Fugly Awards (in its "Good Categories") awarded Warhurst as their Most Spankable Female TV Personality in 2007 & 2008.

She won Best Host at the 2024 Australian Podcast Awards for Bang On.
