= Isaiah (album) =

Studio album by Isaiah
- Released: 9 December 2016
- Recorded: November 2016
- Genre: Pop
- Label: Sony

Singles from Isaiah
- 1. "It's Gotta Be You" Released: 21 November 2016

Isaiah is the self-titled debut studio album by Isaiah, the winner of the eighth season of The X Factor Australia, released through Sony Music Australia on 9 December 2016. The album was preceded by the lead single "It's Gotta Be You", which debuted at number 26 on the ARIA Singles Chart. The album features re-recorded studio tracks of some of the songs he performed on the show including his winning single, "It's Gotta Be You".

== Track listing ==
No.	Title	Writer(s)	Length
1.	"It's Gotta Be You"	Anthony Egizii; David Musumeci	3:13
2.	"Hello" (Adele song)	Adele Adkins; Greg Kurstin	5:09
3.	"If I Ain't Got You" (Alicia Keys song)	Alicia Keys	3:26
4.	"Lay it All On Me" (Rudimental feat. Ed Sheeran song)	Rudimental; James Newman; Jonny Harris; Adam Eaglefield; Jacob Manson; Ed Sheeran	3:38
5.	"Let it Be" (The Beatles song)	Lennon–McCartney	4:08
6.	"Happy" (Pharrell Williams song)	Pharrell Williams	3:27
7.	"No Woman, No Cry" (Bob Marley and the Wailers song)	Vincent Ford	4:23
8.	"FourFiveSeconds" (Rihanna, Kanye West and Paul McCartney song)	Kanye West; Paul McCartney; Kirby Lauryen; Mike Dean; Ty Dolla Sign; Dave Longstreth; Dallas Austin; Elon Rutberg; Noah Goldstein	2:50
9.	"A Change Is Gonna Come" (Sam Cooke song)	Sam Cooke	3:08
10.	"Halo" (Beyoncé song)	Beyoncé Knowles; Ryan Tedder; E. Kidd Bogart	4:18

== Charts ==
=== Weekly charts ===
Chart (2016)	Peak position
Australian Albums (ARIA)	12
New Zealand Heatseekers Albums (RMNZ)	5

== Release history ==
Country	Date	Format	Label	Catalogue
Australia	9 December 2016	CD; digital download	Sony Music Australia	88985403802
