= Back to the Outback =

2021 animated film

- Official release poster
- Directed by: Clare Knight; Harry Cripps
- Screenplay by: Harry Cripps
- Story by: Gregory Lessans; Harry Cripps
- Produced by: Daniela Mazzucato
- Starring: Isla Fisher; Tim Minchin; Eric Bana; Guy Pearce; Miranda Tapsell; Angus Imrie; Keith Urban; Jacki Weaver
- Edited by: Marcus Taylor
- Music by: Rupert Gregson-Williams
- Production companies: Netflix Animation Studios; Reel FX Animation Studios; Weed Road Pictures
- Distributed by: Netflix
- Release date: December 10, 2021
- Running time: 95 minutes
- Countries: United States; Australia
- Language: English

Back to the Outback is a 2021 animated adventure comedy film that follows a group of misunderstood Australian animals who escape from the zoo and find acceptance and freedom in the Outback. It is directed by Clare Knight and Harry Cripps (in their feature directorial debuts), from a screenplay written by Cripps, and a story by Cripps and Gregory Lessans. The voice cast includes Isla Fisher, Tim Minchin, Eric Bana, Guy Pearce, Miranda Tapsell, Angus Imrie, Keith Urban, and Jacki Weaver, and is distributed by Netflix Animation Studios.

The film had a limited theatrical release on December 3, 2021, prior to streaming on Netflix on December 10, to a generally positive reception from critics and audiences.

== Plot ==
At the Australian Wildlife Park in Sydney, zookeeper Chaz Hunt has a show that demonstrates scary and deadly animals. Maddie, an inland taipan, appears regularly at the show but is feared by the public. Maddie is supported by Jackie, a motherly saltwater crocodile, who tells her and her three best friends —Frank, a funnel-web spider, Zoe, a thorny devil, and Nigel, a marbled scorpion— about the Outback, a place recognizable with three mountains where creatures like them belong. One day, Jackie is removed from the zoo after she tries to save Chaz's son, Chazzie, from a moat; the staff and patrons thought she was trying to eat him. Saddened and in despair, Maddie decides to escape to the Outback with her companions to find a place where they can live happily. During their escape, Pretty Boy, a celebrity koala, tries to alert the park's security but is paralyzed by Nigel. The group decides to take him with them, but not before he is caught on a security camera exhibiting mouth foam from his paralyzing.

While crossing Sydney Harbour, they run into Jacinta, a great white shark, who is part of the Ugly Secret Society (USS) where animals considered "monsters" help each other upon hearing a password. When they reach Circular Quay, Pretty Boy tries to get the attention of the city for rescue but finds that the world misbelieves he is dead from rabies after seeing the footage and his popularity has been taken by a quokka named Giggles, convincing him to tag along with them on the journey.

They get a ride from the outer suburbs on an excursion bus that takes them to the Blue Mountains. Chaz and Chazzie catch up and have the bus pulled over to search the vehicle for the creatures, but an Aboriginal girl allows them to escape. Just after Pretty Boy goes on a tirade about how Maddie and the other creatures ruined his life, Chaz ambushes them and almost sedates Maddie, but Pretty Boy says the USS's password, which alerts some Tasmanian devils to their presence. After the animals escape, Chaz ashamedly reveals to Chazzie that his adventurous and Australian wildlife expert history was all a lie and he only moved from Florida to Australia being inspired by television shows featuring Australian zookeepers. He decides to make it up to Chazzie by really going after the animals and bringing them back to the park, though Chazzie is no longer sure about the mission.

Over the next few days, the animals are helped by many creatures of the USS on their way to the Outback, while Pretty Boy bonds more with the creatures. One night, Maddie sings a lullaby that she had sung at the park ago and was her only memory of her mother: she was washed out of the nest as an egg by a flood and after a perilous journey, was found on the road by Chaz. Pretty Boy reveals that he was also orphaned, with his mother being killed by a moving car. The next day, Pretty Boy finds a tree of koalas and leaves the other creatures.

Maddie and the others reach the three mountains. Not long after they arrive, Chaz rounds up and captures Frank, Zoe, and Nigel. Chazzie runs into Maddie and is initially scared of her, but warms up to her upon seeing that she is just as scared as he is of her. Chaz captures Maddie as well and places the creatures in boxes in the back of a truck, but Chazzie sets Maddie free without his father looking. Maddie who broke down crying over losing her friends tries to get the animals of the land to help her rescue them, but they initially refused due to the fact none of them had ever left before. However, Pretty Boy, having found life with the other koalas not as great as he thought, returns. He cheers her up and asks her to go to the rescue. Using a fire truck, they catch up to the truck and break them out. When Maddie, Pretty Boy, and the other creatures save Chazzie from falling over the edge of a canyon, Chaz fully sees these creatures as heroes and decides to let them return to the wild.

At the three mountains, they reunite with Jackie, who is revealed to be the head of the USS and had escaped by knowing a few tricks to do so and then ordered the USS that she had founded during her lifetime to help the group on their journey, and they all join their new life in the Outback.

== Cast ==
- Isla Fisher as Maddie, a kind-hearted, optimistic and sensitive inland taipan snake
- Tim Minchin as Pretty Boy, a self-obsessed koala who suffers from bad luck at every turn
- Guy Pearce as Frank, a lovelorn Australian funnel-web spider
- Miranda Tapsell as Zoe, a smart, self-assured thorny devil
- Angus Imrie as Nigel, a timid marbled scorpion with a British accent
- Keith Urban as Doug, a cane toad who lives in a school
- Jacki Weaver as Jackie, a maternal saltwater crocodile
- Eric Bana as Chaz Hunt, a zookeeper who pursues the escaped animals and is known as the popular hero of his novels. He grew up in Tampa, Florida
- Diesel La Torraca as Chazzie Hunt, Chaz's adventure-seeking son
- Kylie Minogue as Susan, a razorback
- Rachel House as Jacinta, a friendly great white shark with barnacles in her teeth
- Aislinn Derbez as Red Legs, a redback spider
- Lachlan Power as Dave, a tough Tasmanian devil
- Aaron Pedersen as Clive, a dung beetle.
- Celeste Barber as Skylar, a female koala.
- Gia Carides as Doreen, a female cane toad.
- Jack Charles as Greg, a frilled-neck lizard
- Wayne Knight as Phil, a platypus
- John Leary and Liam Knight as the Kids
- Adelaide and Fletcher Kennedy as Zoo Girl and Zoo Boy

== Production ==
Writer and director Harry Cripps had previously created the concept for the cancelled film Larrikins with DreamWorks Animation, which was also supposed to feature a score and music by Tim Minchin; the project was revived as a short film titled Bilby in 2018. In an interview with TheWrap, Cripps said that Larrikins had "focused on the cute animals, and so I didn't want to go back down that same road, I went to the dark side." Clare Knight, whose previous animated film experience includes her work as Lead Editor of the Kung Fu Panda franchise, said "A lot of executives would say to us, 'A snake? Snakes aren't huggable. Does your lead have to be a snake?' And it was a challenge for us that we really wanted to make these animals appealing."

Initially, while Netflix was concerned about the "huggability of the animal cast", both Knight and Cripps said that working for the streaming giant's animation unit was positively heavenly. "It's been great. Again, we're first-time directors, so Netflix is willing to give us a shot and give us a voice, so we really feel great. We would've felt if this was DreamWorks, we possibly would've been pigeonholed as writer and editor and not necessarily been given this chance. And the fact that we reached such a big, global audience with this great depiction of Australia I think, is a wonderful thing for us."

== Soundtrack ==
Back to the Outback

Soundtrack album by Rupert Gregson-Williams
- Released: 10 December 2021
- Genre: Pop
- Labels: Maisie Music, Sony Music Australia

Singles from Back to the Outback
- 1. "Hello World" Released: 3 December 2021; 2. "Beautiful Ugly" Released: 10 December 2021

The film's score was composed by Rupert Gregson-Williams. Executive producer Akiva Goldsman, as director, had previously worked with Gregson-Williams on Winter's Tale. Gregson-Williams had also previously composed the score for animated films such as Over the Hedge, Bee Movie, Postman Pat: The Movie, Open Season: Scared Silly, and Abominable.

The soundtrack features four original songs, including "Hello World" by Evie Irie and "Beautifully Ugly" by Tim Minchin and Irie.

All score tracks are composed by Rupert Gregson-Williams.

No.	Title	Length
1.	"Hello World" (Performed by Evie Irie)	2:37
2.	"ROAR" (Performed by G Flip)	3:56
3.	"Beautifully Ugly" (Performed by Tim Minchin feat. Evie Irie)	2:45
4.	"Maddie's Lullaby" (Performed by Thelma Plum)	1:38
5.	"Jackie's Mountains"	2:15
6.	"Chaz's Show"	3:48
7.	"Jackie"	2:23
8.	"Arrival in Sydney"	2:07
9.	"Pretty Boy Trouble"	2:49
10.	"Redbacks"	2:30
11.	"Near Miss"	1:20
12.	"Toad Love"	1:44
13.	"School Bus Mayhem"	2:37
14.	"Tasmanian Devils"	1:10
15.	"Chaz's Secret"	2:12
16.	"Bonding"	2:02
17.	"Arrival at Jackie's Mountains"	1:38
18.	"Chaz Captures the Gang"	1:22
19.	"Maddie Caught"	2:23
20.	"Let's Get Our Friends Back"	1:25
21.	"Fire Truck Pursuit"	2:51
22.	"Dung Balls"	1:33
23.	"Saving Chazzie"	1:57
24.	"Maddie Beautiful"	1:42
25.	"Outback Parade"	1:58
26.	"Let's Get Away" (Performed by Alex the Astronaut)	2:05
Total length:		56:32

=== Notes ===
Several other songs were featured in the film and trailers but not included in the soundtrack album:

- "Zou Bisou Bisou" by Gillian Hills.
- "9 to 5" by Dolly Parton.
- "Bad Guy" by Billie Eilish.
- "Nails, Hair, Hips, Heels" by Todrick Hall
- "Against All Odds (Take a Look at Me Now)" by Phil Collins.
- "Justified & Ancient" by The KLF.
- "Take a Long Line" by The Angels.
- "Sussudio" by Phil Collins.
- "Wild Child" by Ace Wilder.

== Release ==
On November 30, 2020, Netflix announced that the animated film Back to the Outback would make its world debut in late 2021. However, in October 2021, it was announced that the film would premiere worldwide on December 10, 2021. It also had a limited theatrical release on December 3, prior to its streaming release on Netflix.

In its first week, Back to the Outback accumulated 485 million minutes of viewing time, finishing second in Nielsen's Top 10 Streaming Movies to The Unforgivable starring Sandra Bullock.

In the weeks following its worldwide release, the film reached Top 10 Lists on Netflix in 64 countries, including Australia and the United States.

Since 2024, Back to the Outback has amassed more than 122 million views, making it one of the most-viewed animated releases from Netflix Animation Studios.

=== Critical reception ===
On review aggregator website Rotten Tomatoes, it has an approval rating of 81% based on 17 reviews, with an average rating of 6.10/10. On Metacritic, it has a weighted average score of 58 out of 100, based on 5 critics, indicating "mixed or average" reviews.

Brad Newsome of The Sydney Morning Herald said that the "Gorgeous character design and some delightful voice performances elevate this uneven CGI romp in which a bunch of “ugly” Australian animals break out of a zoo and head for the outback." Natalia Winkelman of The New York Times was also positive, writing: "However generic this movie is in premise, there is wit to be found in its details, and warmth in its message."

Luke Buckmaster of The Guardian was more critical, saying "ho-hum animation won't thrill viewers whose age exceeds their shoe size." He gave the film a 2 out of 5 rating.

=== Accolades ===
Year	Association	Category	Recipient	Result
2021	The ReFrame Stamp	Narrative and Animated Feature	Back to the Outback	Won
