= Marbled scorpion =

Marbled scorpion may refer to various Australian scorpions, including:

- Lychas marmoreus, the little marbled scorpion
- Lychas variatus, the splendid marbled scorpion
