= Australia in the Eurovision Song Contest 2017 =

- Eurovision Song Contest 2017
- Participating broadcaster: Special Broadcasting Service (SBS)
- Country: Australia
- Selection process: Internal selection
- Announcement date: 7 March 2017

Competing entry
- Song: "Don't Come Easy"
- Artist: Isaiah Firebrace
- Songwriters: Anthony Egizii; David Musumeci; Michael Angelo

Placement
- Semi-final result: Qualified (6th, 160 points)
- Final result: 9th, 173 points

Participation chronology

Australia was represented at the Eurovision Song Contest 2017 with the song "Don't Come Easy", written by Anthony Egizii, David Musumeci, and Michael Angelo, and performed by Isaiah Firebrace. The Australian participating broadcaster, Special Broadcasting Service (SBS), internally selected its entry for the contest. The broadcaster announced Firebrace and presented the song to the public on 7 March 2017 during an announcement event in Melbourne.

Australia debuted in the Eurovision Song Contest in 2015 by invitation from the European Broadcasting Union (EBU) as a "one-off" special guest to celebrate the 60th anniversary of Eurovision. On 17 November 2015, the EBU announced that SBS had been invited to participate in the 2016 contest and that Australia would once again take part. In 2015, Australia was guaranteed a spot in the final of the contest and was allowed to vote during both semi-finals and the final; however, from the 2016 contest and onwards, Australia would have to qualify to the final from one of two semi-finals and could only vote in the semi-final in which the nation was allocated to compete.

Australia was drawn to compete in the first semi-final of the Eurovision Song Contest which took place on 9 May 2017. Performing during the show in position 3, "Don't Come Easy" was announced among the top 10 entries of the first semi-final and therefore qualified to compete in the final on 13 May. It was later revealed that Australia placed sixth out of the 18 participating countries in the semi-final with 160 points. In the final, Australia performed in position 14 and placed ninth out of the 26 participating countries, scoring 173 points.

== Background ==
Special Broadcasting Service (SBS) has broadcast the Eurovision Song Contest since 1983, and the contest has gained a cult following over that time, primarily due to the country's strong political and cultural ties with Europe. Paying tribute to this, the 2014 contest semi-finals included an interval act featuring Australian singer Jessica Mauboy. Australian singers have also participated at Eurovision as representatives of other countries, including Olivia Newton-John (United Kingdom 1974), two-time winner Johnny Logan (Ireland 1980 and 1987), Gina G (United Kingdom 1996), and Jane Comerford as lead singer of Texas Lightning (Germany 2006).

Tying in with the goal of Eurovision—to showcase "the importance of bringing countries together to celebrate diversity, music and culture", the 2015 theme of "Building Bridges", and arguing that they could not hold "the world's biggest party" to celebrate the 60th edition of Eurovision without inviting Australia, the EBU announced on 10 February 2015 that the country would compete at that year's edition as a special guest participant. Along with the "Big Five" (France, Germany, Italy, Spain and the United Kingdom), and the host country of Austria, Australia was given automatic entry into the final to "not reduce the chances" of the semi-final participants. On 17 November 2015, the EBU announced that SBS had been invited to participate in the 2016 contest and that Australia would once again take part, however they would have to qualify for the final from one of two semi-finals and could only vote in the semi-final in which the nation was competing. On 1 November 2016, SBS confirmed Australia's participation in the 2017 Eurovision Song Contest after securing an invitation for the third year in a row. In 2016, Australia was represented by Dami Im and the song "Sound of Silence". The country ended in second place in the grand final with 511 points.

== Before Eurovision ==
=== Internal selection ===
"Don't Come Easy" performed by Isaiah Firebrace was announced as the entry that would represent Australia at the Eurovision Song Contest 2017 on 7 March 2017. The announcement event was hosted by Mark Humphries which took place at the Paris Cat Jazz Club in Melbourne. SBS streamed the announcement online through Facebook Live. In regards to his selection as the Australian representative, Firebrace stated: "I'm so proud to be representing Australia as our entrant for the 2017 Eurovision Song Contest. Even though it has been a dream of mine, never did I think for one minute it would be a possibility. To be able to share this news with my family and friends is unbelievable. I can't wait to go to the Ukraine to perform "Don't Come Easy". I will make Australia proud. Thank you to SBS and my label Sony for believing in me and giving me the opportunity of a lifetime." Isaiah Firebrace was also the winner of The X Factor Australia 2016. The official video and digital download release of the song occurred on the same day. The song was written by Michael Angelo along with the songwriting and production team DNA Songs, which consists of Anthony Egizii and David Musumeci.

== At Eurovision ==
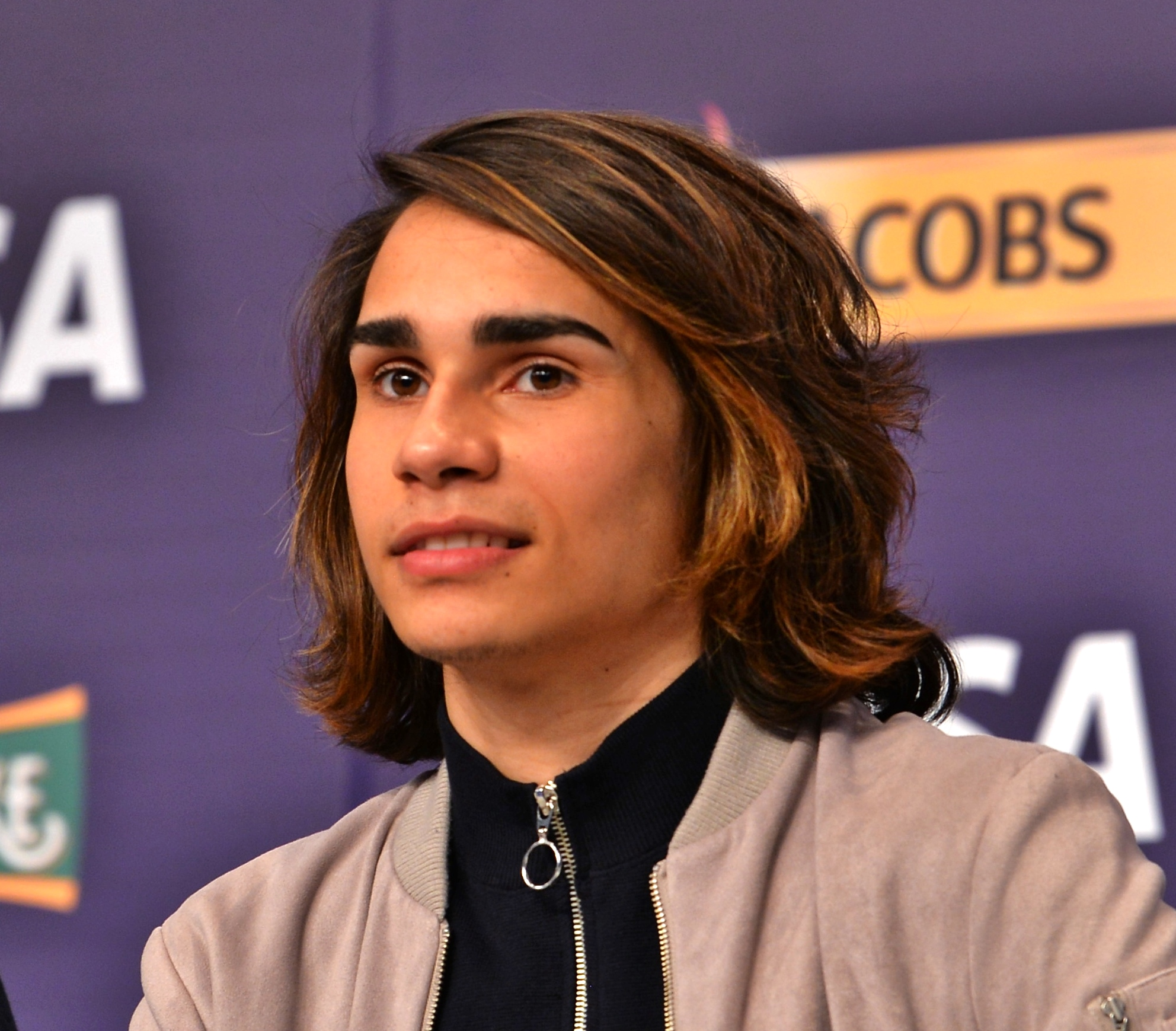
Isaiah Firebrace during a press meet and greet

According to Eurovision rules, all nations with the exceptions of the host country and the "Big Five" (France, Germany, Italy, Spain and the United Kingdom) are required to qualify from one of two semi-finals in order to compete for the final; the top ten countries from each semi-final progress to the final. The European Broadcasting Union (EBU) split up the competing countries into six different pots based on voting patterns from previous contests, with countries with favourable voting histories put into the same pot. On 31 January 2017, a special allocation draw was held which placed each country into one of the two semi-finals, as well as which half of the show they would perform in. Australia was placed into the first semi-final, to be held on 9 May 2017, and was scheduled to perform in the first half of the show.

Once all the competing songs for the 2017 contest had been released, the running order for the semi-finals was decided by the shows' producers rather than through another draw, so that similar songs were not placed next to each other. Australia was set to perform in position 3, following the entry from Georgia and before the entry from Albania.

In Australia, both semi-finals and the final were broadcast live on SBS with commentary by Myf Warhurst and Joel Creasey. The Australian spokesperson, who announced the top 12-point score awarded by the Australian jury during the final, was the television newsreader Lee Lin Chin.

=== Semi-final ===
Isaiah Firebrace took part in technical rehearsals on 30 April and 4 May, followed by dress rehearsals on 8 and 9 May. This included the jury show on 8 May where the professional juries of each country watched and voted on the competing entries.

Once all the competing songs for the 2017 contest had been released, the running order for the semi-finals was decided by the shows' producers rather than through another draw, so that similar songs were not placed next to each other. Australia performed third in the first semi-final, following the entry from Georgia and preceding the entry from Albania. At the end of the show, Australia was announced as having finished in the top 10 and subsequently qualifying for the grand final. It was later revealed that Australia placed sixth in the semi-final, receiving a total of 160 points: 21 points from the televoting and 139 points from the juries.

=== Final ===
Shortly after the first semi-final, a winners' press conference was held for the ten qualifying countries. As part of this press conference, the qualifying artists took part in a draw to determine which half of the grand final they would subsequently participate in. This draw was done in the reverse order the countries appeared in the semi-final running order. Australia was subsequently placed to perform in position 14, following the entry from Croatia and before the entry from Greece. In the unlikely event that Australia should win the contest, the EBU have confirmed that in accordance with the rules, they would co-host the contest in Europe, with Germany announced as the first choice, and United Kingdom the back-up hosts should Germany decline. During the final on 12 May. Australia placed ninth in the final, scoring 173 points: 2 points from the televoting and 171 points from the juries.

=== Voting ===
Below is a breakdown of points awarded to Australia and awarded by Australia in the first semi-final and grand final of the contest, and the breakdown of the jury voting and televoting conducted during the two shows:

==== Points awarded to Australia ====
Points awarded to Australia (Semi-final 1)
Score	Televote	Jury
12 points		Czech Republic; Slovenia; Sweden
10 points		Belgium; Iceland; Latvia
8 points		Finland; Poland; Spain
7 points		Azerbaijan; Cyprus; United Kingdom
6 points	Iceland	Georgia; Moldova; Portugal
5 points		Albania
4 points		
3 points	Armenia; Slovenia	Montenegro
2 points	Azerbaijan; Cyprus; Sweden	
1 point	Albania; Belgium; Montenegro	Armenia; Italy

Points awarded to Australia (Final)
Score	Televote	Jury
12 points		
10 points		Czech Republic; Finland; Iceland; Sweden; United Kingdom
8 points		Denmark; Macedonia; Spain
7 points		Belarus; Estonia; Hungary; Poland; Slovenia
6 points		Belgium; Croatia
5 points		Germany; Latvia; Portugal
4 points		Albania; Cyprus; Moldova; Netherlands; Romania; Switzerland
3 points		Norway; Serbia
2 points	Denmark	France; Ukraine
1 point		Lithuania

==== Points awarded by Australia ====
Points awarded by Australia (Semi-final 1)
Score	Televote	Jury
12 points	Moldova	Poland
10 points	Portugal	Moldova
8 points	Sweden	Sweden
7 points	Montenegro	Finland
6 points	Cyprus	Portugal
5 points	Armenia	Armenia
4 points	Belgium	Czech Republic
3 points	Greece	Azerbaijan
2 points	Finland	Iceland
1 point	Azerbaijan	Greece

Points awarded by Australia (Final)
Score	Televote	Jury
12 points	Moldova	United Kingdom
10 points	Romania	Moldova
8 points	Denmark	Bulgaria
7 points	Portugal	Portugal
6 points	Sweden	Sweden
5 points	Bulgaria	Denmark
4 points	Belgium	Netherlands
3 points	United Kingdom	Austria
2 points	Italy	Poland
1 point	Croatia	Armenia

==== Detailed voting results ====
The following members comprised the Australian jury: On 9 May 2017, it was announced that Natasha Cuppit had replaced Jordan Raskopoulos as a member of the Australian jury.

- Steven Capaldo (jury chairperson) – university music education lecturer, conductor, composer, CD producer
- Lucy Durack – performer, actress
- Natasha Cuppit – voice coach, performer, conductor
- Jackie Loeb – singer, comedian, actor
- Peter Hayward – music teacher, music director, creative director

Detailed voting results from Australia (Semi-final 1)
R/O	Country	Jury							Televote	
R/O	Country	S. Capaldo	L. Durack	J. Loeb	P. Hayward	N. Cuppit	Rank	Points	Rank	Points
01	Sweden	1	2	4	6	9	3	8	3	8
02	Georgia	15	12	6	16	6	12		17	
03	Australia									
04	Albania	17	17	16	17	17	17		16	
05	Belgium	10	7	15	14	15	15		7	4
06	Montenegro	16	16	17	15	16	16		4	7
07	Finland	3	5	12	4	5	4	7	9	2
08	Azerbaijan	9	10	13	7	4	8	3	10	1
09	Portugal	8	4	2	8	8	5	6	2	10
10	Greece	4	13	11	10	12	10	1	8	3
11	Poland	5	1	5	2	1	1	12	15	
12	Moldova	2	3	7	1	2	2	10	1	12
13	Iceland	12	14	9	5	7	9	2	11	
14	Czech Republic	7	6	1	9	13	7	4	13	
15	Cyprus	13	11	10	11	14	14		5	6
16	Armenia	6	9	3	3	11	6	5	6	5
17	Slovenia	14	15	8	12	3	11		14	
18	Latvia	11	8	14	13	10	13		12	

Detailed voting results from Australia (Final)
R/O	Country	Jury							Televote	
R/O	Country	S. Capaldo	L. Durack	J. Loeb	P. Hayward	N. Cuppit	Rank	Points	Rank	Points
01	Israel	10	24	18	19	22	19		17	
02	Poland	13	11	11	11	7	9	2	22	
03	Belarus	17	15	16	16	13	16		14	
04	Austria	20	5	12	3	8	8	3	19	
05	Armenia	19	8	10	10	11	10	1	15	
06	Netherlands	15	9	2	4	6	7	4	11	
07	Moldova	3	2	5	6	3	2	10	1	12
08	Hungary	21	13	25	15	23	20		12	
09	Italy	2	12	21	13	14	13		9	2
10	Denmark	6	10	8	1	10	6	5	3	8
11	Portugal	9	3	1	5	9	4	7	4	7
12	Azerbaijan	8	14	14	18	4	11		21	
13	Croatia	24	16	24	24	19	24		10	1
14	Australia									
15	Greece	18	20	19	23	20	22		16	
16	Spain	25	25	23	25	25	25		25	
17	Norway	11	22	9	12	21	15		13	
18	United Kingdom	1	1	3	2	2	1	12	8	3
19	Cyprus	22	21	15	21	24	23		20	
20	Romania	14	4	20	7	17	12		2	10
21	Germany	12	18	17	20	12	17		23	
22	Ukraine	23	23	13	22	16	21		24	
23	Belgium	7	19	7	14	18	14		7	4
24	Sweden	4	6	6	9	5	5	6	5	6
25	Bulgaria	5	7	4	8	1	3	8	6	5
26	France	16	17	22	17	15	18		18	
