= Isaiah Firebrace =

Australian singer (born 1999)

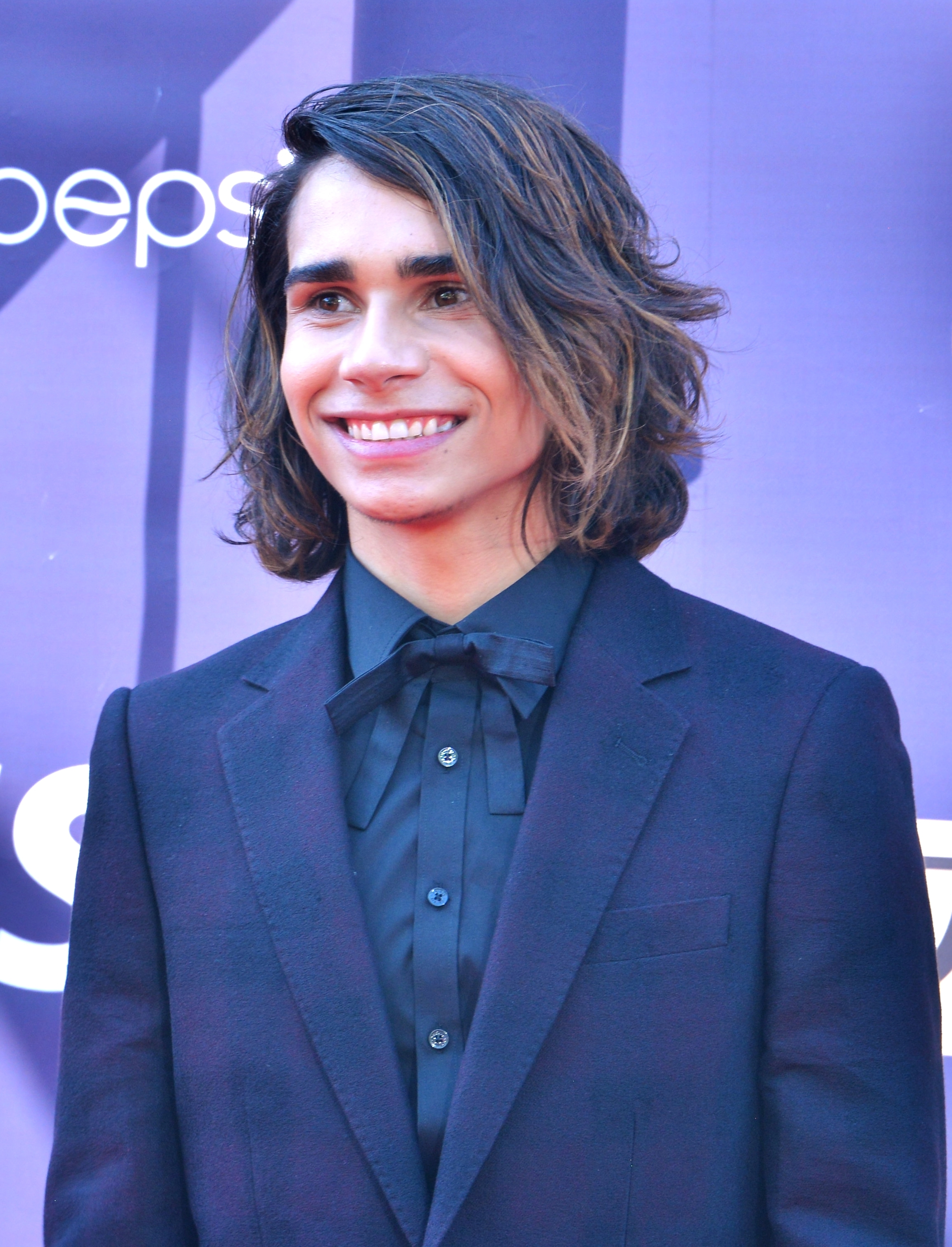
- Firebrace at the Eurovision Song Contest 2017

Background information
- Born: 21 November 1999 (age 26); Portland, Victoria, Australia
- Origin: Moama, New South Wales, Australia
- Genres: Pop; soul
- Occupation: Singer
- Years active: 2016–present
- Label: Sony
- Website: isaiahofficial.com

Isaiah Firebrace (born 21 November 1999) is an Australian singer who won the eighth season of The X Factor Australia in 2016. He then represented Australia in the Eurovision Song Contest 2017 with the song "Don't Come Easy", where he finished ninth.

== Early life ==
One of twelve children, Firebrace was born in Portland, Victoria, and raised in Moama, New South Wales. He is an Aboriginal Australian; his father is Yorta Yorta and his mother Gunditjmara. Firebrace first came to public attention when he entered the Fast Track Singing Competition in Melbourne. This led to a scholarship at the David Jaanz School of Singing.

== Career ==
=== 2016: The X Factor and debut album ===
Isaiah auditioned for the eighth season of The X Factor Australia, singing a cover of Adele's "Hello". Making it through to Bootcamp, he performed a cover of Alicia Keys' "If I Ain't Got You". From the live shows, he advanced to the Grand Final.

On 21 November 2016, at the Grand Final, Isaiah performed Avicii's "Wake Me Up" with Jessica Mauboy, and his winner's single "It's Gotta Be You", winning the contest. His winner's single peaked at number 26 on the Australian Singles Chart. The song also charted in Denmark, Netherlands, New Zealand, and Sweden.

On 9 December 2016, Isaiah released his debut studio album Isaiah. The album peaked at number 12 on the Australian Albums Chart.

The X Factor performances and results (2016)
Episode	Song	Original Artist	Result
Audition	"Hello"	Adele	Through to bootcamp
Bootcamp	"If I Ain't Got You"	Alicia Keys	Through to live shows
Live show 1	"Lay It All on Me"	Rudimental ft. Ed Sheeran	Safe
Live show 2	"Let It Be"	The Beatles	Safe
Live show 3	"Happy"	Pharrell Williams	Safe
Live show 4	"A Change Is Gonna Come"	Sam Cooke	Safe
Live show 4	"FourFiveSeconds"	Rihanna	Safe
Grand Final	"Halo"	Beyoncé	Winner
Grand Final	"Wake Me Up" (with Jessica Mauboy)	Avicii	Winner
Grand Final	"It's Gotta Be You"	Firebrace	Winner

=== 2017–present: Eurovision Song Contest and subsequent projects ===
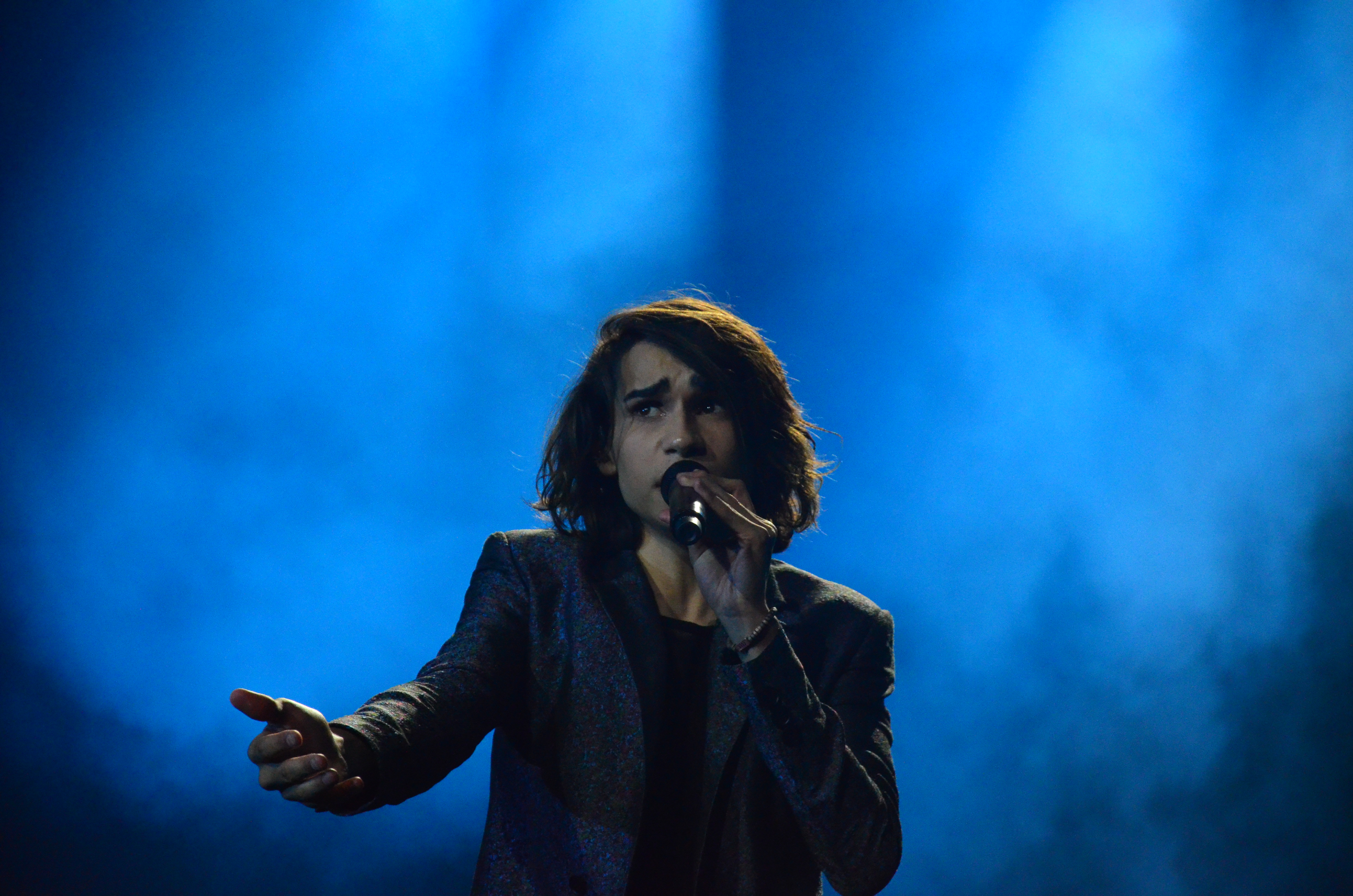
Isaiah at Kyiv (2017)

Following his X-Factor win, Firebrace reported that he was interested in representing Australia in the Eurovision Song Contest, and put his name forward for possible participation in the 2017 contest. On 7 March 2017, broadcaster SBS announced that they had internally selected Firebrace to represent Australia at the Eurovision Song Contest 2017 in Kyiv, Ukraine. His entry, "Don't Come Easy", was written by DNA Songs, who also composed Dami Im's entry "Sound of Silence".

On 9 May 2017, he qualified from the first semi-final and competed in the final on 13 May, finishing in 9th place.

Throughout 2019, Firebrace completed a 55-date 'Spirit and Beyond' tour through central and regional Australia, where he made it a priority to speak with as many Aboriginal school children as possible to pass on powerful messages about working hard to achieve goals and the importance of finding a passion.

In 2019, Firebrace sang the Australian National Anthem at the TAB Million Dollar Chase greyhound race at Wentworth Park.

In July 2020, Firebrace released "Know Me Better". He said "This song actually means a lot to me because I finally feel like I'm starting to know myself better and I am heading in the direction I want to with my music. I've been in the studio a lot over the last three years and have experimented with lots of styles but 'Know Me Better' is a song that I'm really proud to release. I love the song, I love the production and I just can't wait to be able to show people this song". Firebrace also announced that he was writing a children's book, "The Purple Platypus", which pushes a positive message for kids who feel different.

In August 2020, Firebrace was revealed to be competing as the "Wizard" on the second season of The Masked Singer Australia. He was the sixth contestant eliminated, placing 7th overall.

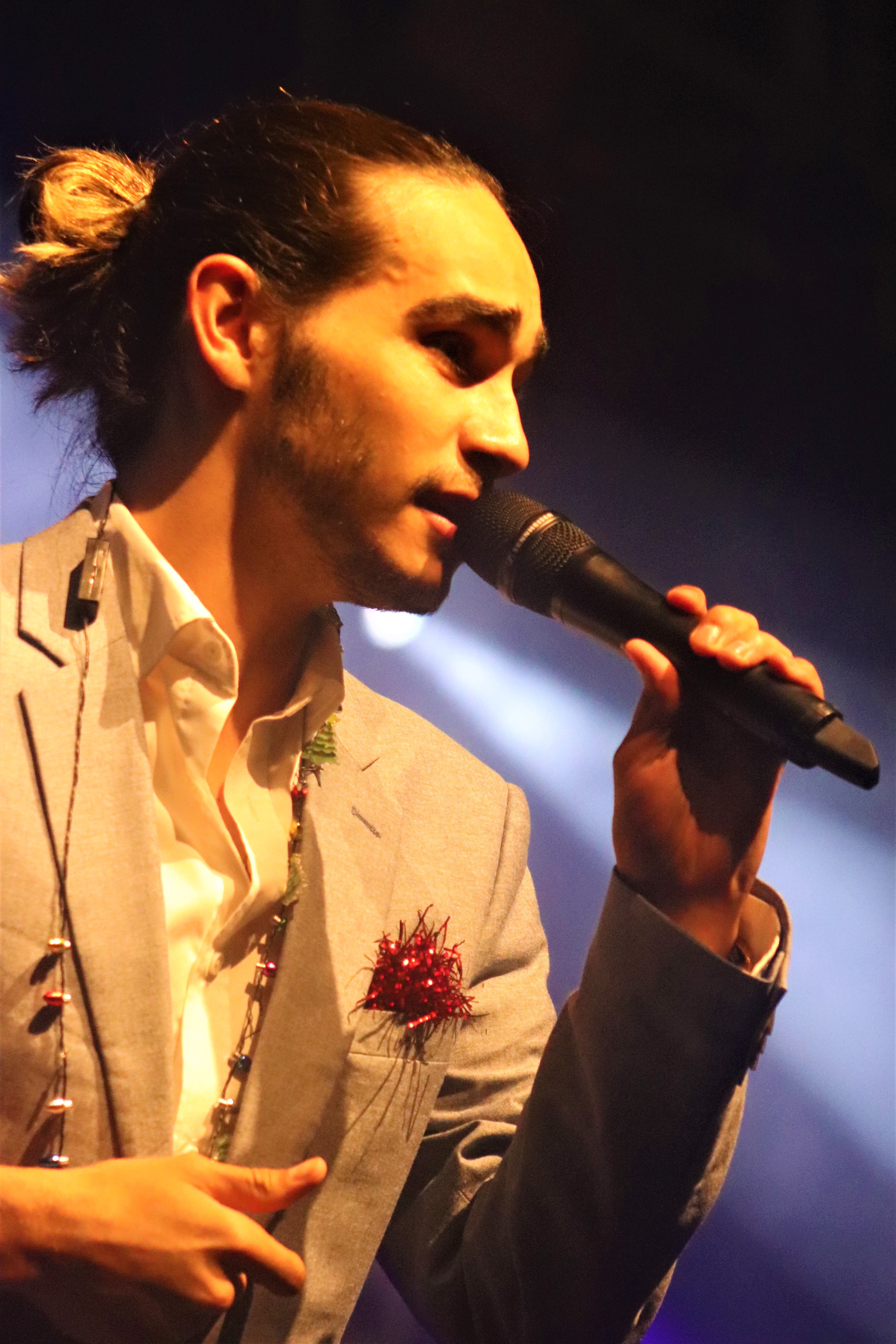
Firebrace performing in December 2019

In 2022, Firebrace participated in Eurovision - Australia Decides for a chance to represent his country in the 2022 contest. He duetted with singer Evie Irie with the song "When I'm With You", ultimately finishing in 10th place.

In September 2022, Firebrace released "Come Together" with Lee Kernaghan and Mitch Tambo. The song coincides with Firebrace's new children's book, also called Come Together, published on 16 November 2022. Illustrated by Jaelyn Biumaiwai, the book was shortlisted for the 2023 CBCA Eve Pownall Award.

In November 2022, Firebrace released the self-composed Christmas song "First Christmas".

== Discography ==
=== Studio albums ===
Title	Details	Peak chart positions	
Title	Details	AUS	NZ Heat.
Isaiah	Released: 9 December 2016 (Australia); Label: Sony Music Australia; Formats: CD, digital download	12	5

=== Singles ===
==== As lead artist ====
Title	Year	Peak chart positions						Certifications	Album
Title	Year	AUS	BEL (Fl) Tip	DEN	NLD	NZ Heat.	SWE	Certifications	Album
"It's Gotta Be You"	2016	26	— (Note: "It's Gotta Be You" did not chart on the Flemish Ultratop 50, but did register on the Ultratip chart.)	21	60	6	15	ARIA: Platinum; IFPI DEN: Gold; GLF: 2× Platinum	Isaiah
"Don't Come Easy"	2017	69	47	—	—	—	50		Eurovision Song Contest 2017
"Streets of Gold"	2017	—	—	—	—	—	—		Non-album singles
"Close to Me"	2018	—	—	—	—	—	—		Non-album singles
"Spirit"	2019	—	—	—	—	—	—		Non-album singles
"What Happened to Us"	2019	—	—	—	—	—	—		Non-album singles
"Thinking About You"	2020	—	—	—	—	—	—		Non-album singles
"Know Me Better"	2020	—	—	—	—	—	—		Non-album singles
"You"	2020	—	—	—	—	—	—		Non-album singles
"Blame on Me"	2021	—	—	—	—	—	—		Non-album singles
"More Than Me"	2021	—	—	—	—	—	—		Non-album singles
"When I'm With You" (with Evie Irie)	2022	—	—	—	—	—	—		Non-album singles
"Come Together" (with Lee Kernaghan and Mitch Tambo)	2022	—	—	—	—	—	—		Non-album singles
"First Christmas"	2022	—	—	—	—	—	—		Non-album singles
"Have You Ever?"	2023	—	—	—	—	—	—		Non-album singles
"All I Can Give"	2023	—	—	—	—	—	—		Non-album singles
"Balance"	2024	—	—	—	—	—	—		Non-album singles
"—" denotes a recording that did not chart or was not released in that territory.

==== As featured artist ====
List of singles as featured artist
Song	Year	Album
"You're the Voice" (as part of United Voices Against Domestic Violence)	2017	Non-album single

=== Non-single album appearances ===
Title	Year	Album
"Something Stupid" (with Jessica Mauboy)	2017	The Secret Daughter Season Two: Songs from the Original 7 Series
"Don't Change"	2018	Countdown: Live At The Sydney Opera House
"Don't Dream It's Over"	2018	Countdown: Live At The Sydney Opera House
"Solid Rock" (with Shane Howard)	2018	Countdown: Live At The Sydney Opera House
"Dont Dream It's Over" (with Stan Walker)	2020	Deadly Hearts: Walking Together

== Awards and nominations ==
=== Country Music Awards of Australia ===
The Country Music Awards of Australia is an annual awards night held in January during the Tamworth Country Music Festival. Celebrating recording excellence in the Australian country music industry. They commenced in 1973.

Year	Nominee / work	Award	Result	Ref.
2023	"Come Together" (with Lee Kernaghan and Mitch Tambo)	Vocal Collaboration of the Year	Nominated	
2023	"Come Together" (with Lee Kernaghan and Mitch Tambo)	Heritage Song of the Year	Nominated	

Awards and achievements
Preceded by Cyrus Villanueva	The X Factor Australia; Winner; 2016	Succeeded by N/A (show cancelled)
Preceded by Dami Im with "Sound of Silence"	Australia in the Eurovision Song Contest; 2017	Succeeded by Jessica Mauboy with "#We Got Love"
