= Lychas ceylonensis =

Scientific classification
- Kingdom: Animalia
- Phylum: Arthropoda
- Subphylum: Chelicerata
- Class: Arachnida
- Order: Scorpiones
- Family: Buthidae
- Genus: Lychas
- Species: L. ceylonensis

Binomial name
- Lychas ceylonensis Lourenço & Huber, 1999

Species of scorpion

Lychas ceylonensis is a species of scorpion in the family Buthidae. It is endemic to Sri Lanka. The name is derived from the old name of Sri Lanka (Ceylon). The species has similarities with Lychas srilankensis, but can be differentiated by physical differences and differing habitats: L. srilankensis coming from a humid regions, whereas L. ceylonensis comes from dry formations closer to the center of the island.
