= Lychas buchari =

Scientific classification
- Kingdom: Animalia
- Phylum: Arthropoda
- Subphylum: Chelicerata
- Class: Arachnida
- Order: Scorpiones
- Family: Buthidae
- Genus: Lychas
- Species: L. buchari

Binomial name
- Lychas buchari Kovarík, 1997

Species of scorpion

Lychas buchari, also known as the yellow sand scorpion or Buchar's scorpion, is a species of small scorpion in the Buthidae family. It is native to Australia, and was first described in 1997 by Czech arachnologist Frantisek Kovarik.

== Etymology ==
The species epithet buchari honours Czech arachnologist Jan Buchar of Charles University in Prague.

== Description ==
The base colour of the species is a uniform yellow to yellowish-brown. They grow to an average length of 55 mm. They have an estimated life span of 8 years.

They have the greatest number of pectinal teeth of all Lychas species, with a count of 26. These teeth are used to detect stimuli and convey neural signals throughout the scorpion's body. As small buthid scorpions they also carry a potent venom, with a researchers account of the sting comparing the pain to a sharp burn. Lasting 15 minutes with residual pain continuing another 2 hours. The sting site remained highly sensitive for the next 2 days.

Like all scorpions they possess two main weapons, their stinging apparatus and pedipalps (claws). Lychas buchari has less pronounced pedipalps relative to other buthid scorpions and is more inclined to use their tail to both subdue prey and defend themselves. They glow under ultraviolet light; the cause is unknown; some conjecture that it is due to the absorption of fluorescent minerals, though this is unconfirmed. This does make them easier targets for people to sample during night as they glow a bright greenish-blue colour when a ultraviolet light is used, contrasting sharply with the sandy environment.

== Distribution and habitat ==
The species is found in central Australia, including northern South Australia, western New South Wales and Western Australia. The scorpions have been seen to roam at night across sand-dunes surrounding dry salt lakes.

== Behaviour ==
=== Captivity ===
Lychas burchari can survive in captivity but are only recommended to experts that have cared for buthid scorpions before. They have a generally timid manner but still can produce a painful sting. All enclosures should have sufficient space for the animals' well-being and simulate its natural habitat, red sand dunes; this is both for the scorpions health and quality of life.

=== Reproduction ===
Males and females have a couple defining features to help identify their separate sexes. On average males have longer tails (metasoma) and thinner bodies (mesosoma) compared to females. The pedipalps are also more bulbous and short on males compared to females which help for gripping their mating partner.

The mating ritual/dance between scorpions is called the promenade à deux (walk for two). It begins with the male grasping the females pedipalps and circle each other for a few minutes. During this time the males spermatophore is being prepared and the female starts producing a substrate to accept the spermatophore. Once ready the male positions himself directly over the females genital region and excretes his sperm. Once the exchange is complete the scorpions will either go separate ways as normal, or if the female is particularly aggressive will then eat the male.

After fertilisation the offspring develop in the ovariuterus or a small pocket that grows from there. The embryos are nourished through nutrient secretions within the ovariuterus. After the allotted gestation period all young is birthed at the same time.

=== Feeding ===
Lychas burchari, along with all desert dwelling scorpions, rely on pectinal teeth to sense vibrations on the sand surface. They are usually nocturnal hunters that go out at night and wait for suitable prey to come within range. Once they detect a prey target they approach pedipalps first and try to lock down the target. Then proceed to inject neuro toxins through their tail stinger to completely debilitate their prey.

They prey on mostly small insects, spiders and even small lizards when the opportunity is available. Though having extremely small mouth parts means all prey caught must be mashed up and broken down with enzymes. This process can take up to an hour yet these scorpions can last months between meals.
