= Evie Irie =

Australian singer

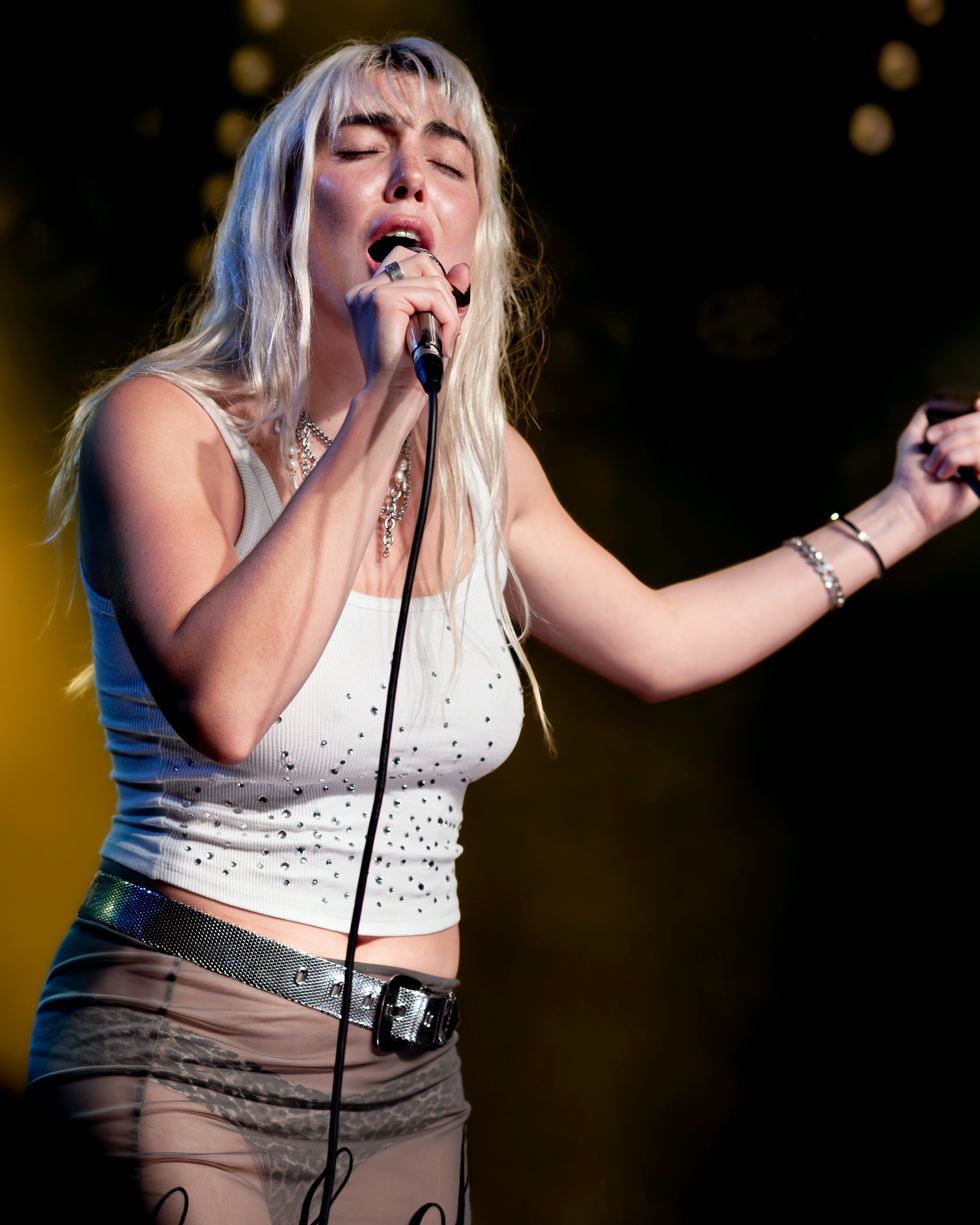

Background information
- Born: December 2002 (age 23); Sydney, Australia
- Genres: Pop
- Occupations: Singer; songwriter
- Instruments: Vocals, guitar, piano
- Years active: 2019–present
- Label: Republic Records

Evie Irie (born December 2002) is an Australian pop singer and songwriter from Sydney. She released her debut extended play 5 Weeks in LA in 2019 through Republic Records, after travelling to the United States to pursue becoming a singer. In 2020, she released the EPs The Optimist and The Pessimist, she also collaborated with producer Dillon Francis on the song "Be Somebody", and Her most recent single "Danny DeVito (I Want It)".

== Life and career ==
Irie grew up on the Central Coast, to the north of Sydney. From a young age she performed in cafés and restaurants around her home town, and began writing songs at 12. Finding her own life dull, Irie drew inspiration from the stories her older sister told her of her teenage life. At a time when many of her friends were going on exchange programs when Irie was 15, she decided instead to spend a year in the United States to develop herself as a singer and songwriter and find connections in the music industry, travelling to Los Angeles, New York City and Nashville.

Irie wrote her first extended play during a five-week period visiting Los Angeles. After finding more inspiration than she expected (having planned to stay for only a single week, but extended her stay after her father was impressed at the songs), Irie continued to write and network. By the end of the five weeks, Irie had been signed to major label Republic Records. The EP was released in mid-2019, after which she spent time touring with Norwegian singer Sigrid and British band Bastille. Her second EP, The Optimist, was released in September 2020, quickly followed by a companion EP entitled The Pessimist in November. In the same month, Irie collaborated with Dillon Francis on the single "Be Somebody".

== Personal life ==
Irie has two sisters. She experiences a small degree of synesthesia, experiencing colours when she listens to music.

== Industry ==
Evie is managed by Troy Carter, and signed in 2019 with Downtown Music Publishing.

== Discography ==
=== Extended plays ===
Title	Details
5 Weeks in LA	Released: 28 June 2019; Label: Republic Records; Formats: Digital download, streaming
The Optimist	Released: 18 September 2020; Label: Republic; Formats: Digital download, streaming
The Pessimist	Released: 6 November 2020; Label: Republic; Formats: Digital download, streaming

=== Singles ===
List of singles, showing year released and album name
Title	Year	Album
"Bitter"	2019	5 Weeks in LA
"The Optimist"	2019	5 Weeks in LA / The Optimist
"Over Him"	2020	The Pessimist
"Worst Enemy"	2020	The Pessimist
"Better than This"	2020	Non-album single
"Little More Love"	2020	The Optimist
"Carry Your Heart"	2020	The Optimist
"Misfit"	2020	The Pessimist
"Hello World"	2021	Back to the Outback (soundtrack)
"When I'm With You" (with Isaiah Firebrace)	2022	TBA
"I Want It (Danny DeVito)"	2023	TBA
"Berlin Bitch"	2023	TBA
"Laila"	2024	TBA
"Alter Ego"	2025	TBA
"Mercedes Medicated"	2025	TBA
"I'm Not Sorry"	2025	TBA
"Rebel"	2025	TBA
"Zombie Party"	2025	TBA
"Kiss and Run"	2025	TBA

=== As featured artist ===
List of singles as lead artist, with selected chart positions, showing year released and album name
Title	Year	Peak chart positions	Album
Title	Year	US Dance	Album
"Be Somebody" (Dillon Francis featuring Evie Irie)	2020	35	Non-album single
"Beautiful Ugly" (Tim Minchin featuring Evie Irie)	2021	–	Back to the Outback (soundtrack)
"I Hope You Like Crazy Girls" (Gypsy Lee featuring Evie Irie)	2026	–	TBA
