= Lychas jonesae =

Scientific classification
- Kingdom: Animalia
- Phylum: Arthropoda
- Subphylum: Chelicerata
- Class: Arachnida
- Order: Scorpiones
- Family: Buthidae
- Genus: Lychas
- Species: L. jonesae

Binomial name
- Lychas jonesae Glauert, 1925

Species of scorpion

Lychas jonesae, also known as the ochre scorpion, is a species of scorpion in the Buthidae family. It is native to Australia, and was first described in 1925 by Australian paleontologist and Western Australian Museum curator Ludwig Glauert.

== Distribution ==
The species occurs on Australia’s Western Plateau and in the Murray-Darling Basin.
