= Lychas mjobergi =

Scientific classification
- Kingdom: Animalia
- Phylum: Arthropoda
- Subphylum: Chelicerata
- Class: Arachnida
- Order: Scorpiones
- Family: Buthidae
- Genus: Lychas
- Species: L. mjobergi

Binomial name
- Lychas mjobergi Kraepelin, 1916

Species of scorpion

Lychas mjobergi is a species of scorpion in the Buthidae family. It is endemic to Australia, and was first described in 1916 by German naturalist Karl Kraepelin following the collection of specimen material from the Kimberley region of Western Australia by Swedish zoologist Eric Mjöberg, for which the species was named.
