= Don't Come Easy =

2017 single by Isaiah Firebrace

Single by Isaiah Firebrace
- Released: 8 March 2017
- Genre: Pop
- Length: 3:07
- Label: Sony Music Australia
- Songwriters: Anthony Egizii; David Musumeci; Michael Angelo

Isaiah Firebrace singles chronology
"It's Gotta Be You" (2016)	"Don't Come Easy" (2017)	"Streets of Gold" (2017)

Music video
- "Don't Come Easy" on YouTube

Eurovision Song Contest 2017 entry
- Country: Australia
- Artist: Isaiah Firebrace
- Language: English
- Composers: Anthony Egizii, David Musumeci, Michael Angelo
- Lyricists: Anthony Egizii, David Musumeci, Michael Angelo

Finals performance
- Semi-final result: 6th
- Semi-final points: 160
- Final result: 9th
- Final points: 173

Entry chronology
- ◄ "Sound of Silence" (2016)
- "We Got Love" (2018) ►

Official performance videos
- "Don't Come Easy" (first semi-final) on YouTube "Don't Come Easy" (grand final) on YouTube

"Don't Come Easy" is a song performed by Australian recording artist Isaiah Firebrace. The song was released as a digital download on 8 March 2017 through Sony Music Australia. The song represented Australia in the Eurovision Song Contest 2017.

== Eurovision Song Contest ==
Isaiah Firebrace was internally selected to represent Australia at the Eurovision Song Contest 2017. The song was announced on 7 March 2017, and represented Australia in the Eurovision Song Contest 2017. The song was revealed on stage at an intimate performance in Melbourne.

Denis Handlin, AM Chairman and CEO of Sony Music Entertainment said "At only 17, it's a truly remarkable achievement for Isaiah to be representing Australia in Eurovision this year and I am very proud that he has been given this opportunity to showcase his immense talent on this global stage."

SBS Managing Director Michael Ebeid described Firebrace as an "immense talent" who "beautifully embodies the Australian spirit with his passion, hard work and humility." In a statement, Firebrace said, "I'm so proud to be representing Australia as our entrant for the Eurovision Song Contest 2017. Even though it has been a dream of mine, never did I think for one minute it would be a possibility. I can't wait to go to the Ukraine to perform 'Don't Come Easy'. I will make Australia proud. Thank you to SBS and my label Sony for believing in me and giving me the opportunity of a lifetime."

The first semi-final took place on 9 May 2017. Australia performed third and were announced as one of the ten qualifying songs for the grand final. Results published following the grand final show Australia came sixth with 160 points.

Shortly after the first semi-final, a winners' press conference was held for the ten qualifying countries and the qualifying artists took part in a draw to determine in which half of the grand final they would subsequently participate. Australia was drawn to compete in the second half. Australia was placed to perform in position 14, following the entry from Croatia and before the entry from Greece.

In the final Australia placed ninth overall; received 171 points from the juries and two points from the televote, receiving a total of 173 points.

Following the result Firebrace said, "Fourth in the jury vote was incredible, and then ninth overall was just amazing. I said to myself before coming over to Kiev that if I made it in the top ten, I'm going to be on top of the moon... and I am over the moon."

== Reception ==
Zanda Wilson from Music Feeds said "'Don't Come Easy' is a powerful ballad that seems tailor-made for a European audiences. It showcases Firebrace's excellent vocal range, and is a great example of how much passion and emotion can be felt when listening to him sing... 'Don’t Come Easy' seems like the perfect way to catapult Australia to go one better and become champions of Europe."

Mike Wass from Idolator said "The track showcases Isaiah's vocal chops.. I'm not sure how it will fare amid the general corniness and cheese of Eurovision, but it's a great song that wouldn't sound out of place on a Sam Smith album."

Chris Zeiher from Special Broadcasting Service described the song as "a deliciously slick and contemporary ballad that does not stray too far from the formula that brought Dami Im success last year and suits Isaiah's voice perfectly."

== Track listing ==
Digital download/ CD single
No.	Title	Length
1.	"Don't Come Easy"	3:07

7th Heaven Remix
No.	Title	Length
1.	"Don't Come Easy" (7th Heaven Remix)	5:52

== Charts ==
Chart (2017)	Peak position
Australia (ARIA)	69
Belgium (Ultratip Bubbling Under Flanders)	47
Sweden (Sverigetopplistan)	50

== Release history ==
Country	Date	Format	Label
various	8 March 2017	Digital download	
