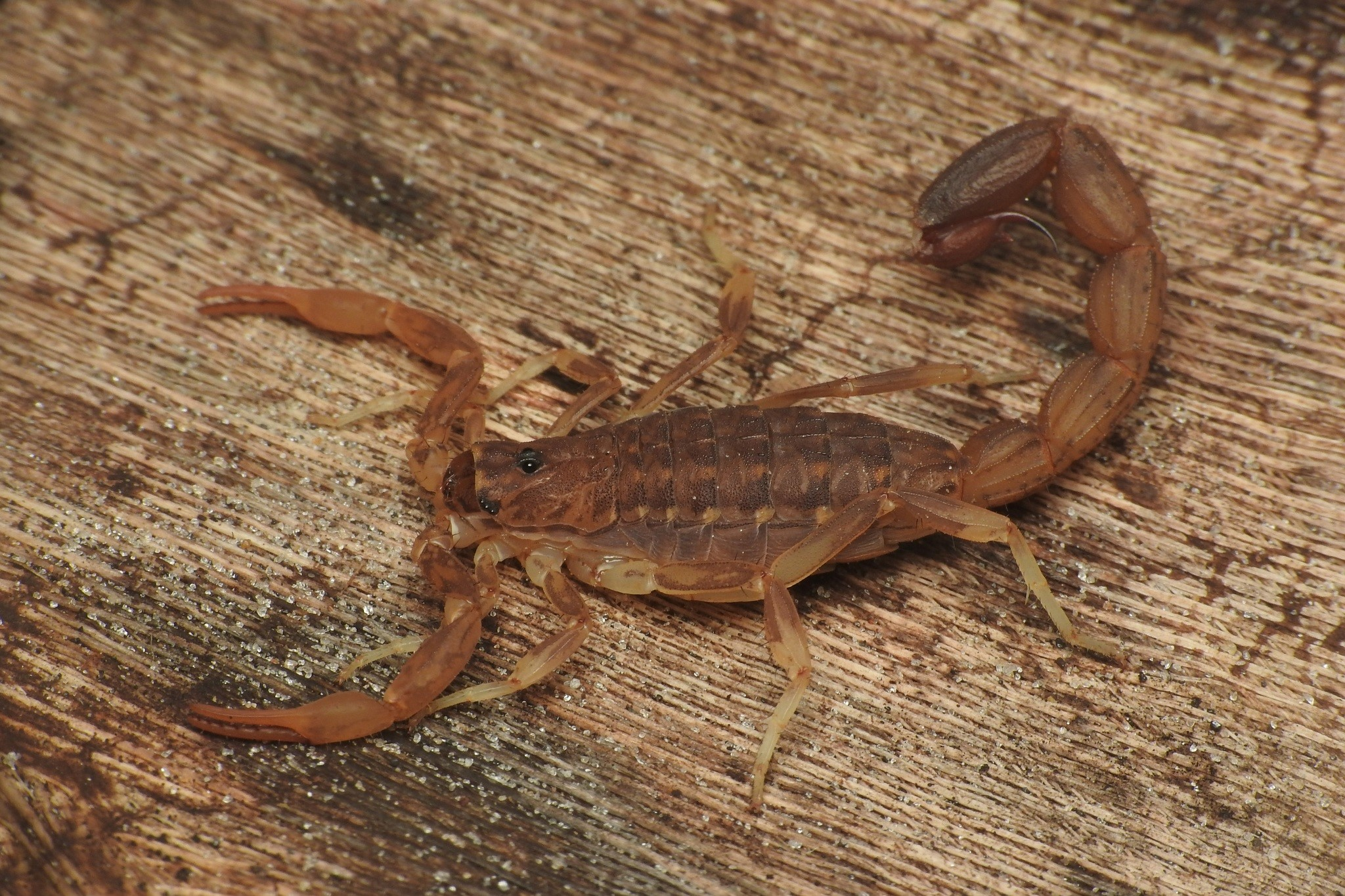

Scientific classification
- Kingdom: Animalia
- Phylum: Arthropoda
- Subphylum: Chelicerata
- Class: Arachnida
- Order: Scorpiones
- Family: Buthidae
- Genus: Lychas
- Species: L. srilankensis

Binomial name
- Lychas srilankensis Lourenço, 1997

Synonyms
- Lychas ceylonensis Lourenço & Huber, 1999

= Lychas srilankensis =

Species of scorpion

Lychas srilankensis is a species of scorpion in the family Buthidae. It is endemic to Sri Lanka.

== Description ==
Total length is 38 to 65 mm.
