= It's Gotta Be You =

Single by Isaiah

from the album Isaiah
- Released: 21 November 2016
- Recorded: 2016
- Genre: Pop
- Length: 3:11
- Label: Sony Music Australia
- Songwriters: Anthony Egizii; David Musumeci
- Producer: DNA Songs

Isaiah singles chronology
"It's Gotta Be You" (2016)	"Don't Come Easy" (2017)

"It's Gotta Be You" is the debut and winner's single by Isaiah, the farewell season winner of The X Factor Australia. "It's Gotta Be You" was written by Anthony Egizii and David Musumeci and was released digitally immediately after it was announced he had won, on 21 November 2016 as the lead single from his self-titled debut album. The song debuted and peaked at number 26 on the ARIA Singles Chart. As of September 2019 the song has gained over 230 million streams on Spotify and was certified platinum in 2018.

== Live performances ==
Isaiah performed "It's Gotta Be You" live for the first time during The X Factor grand final announcement show on 21 November 2016. He reprised the song after he was announced as the winner. "This has been my dream, and I can't believe it came true on my birthday," Firebrace said after the announcement. Isaiah performed the song live on The Morning Show on 22 November 2016.

== Chart performance ==
"It's Gotta Be You" debuted on the Australian ARIA Singles Chart at number 26, from three days of sales. It is the lowest debut for an Australian X Factor winner's single and first to miss the ARIA top 10.

== Track listing ==
Digital download
No.	Title	Length
1.	"It's Gotta Be You"	3:32

Digital download – remixes
No.	Title	Length
1.	"It's Gotta Be You" (Tungevaag & Raaban remix)	3:08
2.	"It's Gotta Be You" (Toby Green remix)	3:37
3.	"It's Gotta Be You" (Todiefor remix)	3:08

== Charts ==
=== Weekly charts ===
Chart (2016–17)	Peak position
Australia (ARIA)	26
Australian Artist Singles (ARIA)	5
Czech Republic Singles Digital (ČNS IFPI)	59
Denmark (Tracklisten)	21
Netherlands (Single Top 100)	60
New Zealand Heatseekers (RMNZ)	6
Slovakia Singles Digital (ČNS IFPI)	60
Sweden (Sverigetopplistan)	15

=== Year-end charts ===
Chart (2017)	Position
Denmark (Tracklisten)	91
Sweden (Sverigetopplistan)	76

== Certifications ==
Region	Certification	Certified units/sales
Australia (ARIA)	Platinum	70,000^{‡}
Denmark (IFPI Danmark)	Platinum	90,000^{‡}
Sweden (GLF)	2× Platinum	80,000^{‡}
^{‡} Sales+streaming figures based on certification alone.

== Release history ==
Country	Date	Edition	Format	Label
Australia	21 November 2016	Radio edit	Digital download	Sony Music Australia
Australia	31 March 2017	Remixes	Digital download	Sony Music Australia
