= Lychas serratus =

Scientific classification
- Kingdom: Animalia
- Phylum: Arthropoda
- Subphylum: Chelicerata
- Class: Arachnida
- Order: Scorpiones
- Family: Buthidae
- Genus: Lychas
- Species: L. serratus

Binomial name
- Lychas serratus (Pocock, 1891)

Species of scorpion

Lychas serratus is a species of scorpion that is endemic to the island of Mauritius in the Indian Ocean. It was last seen in 1868, and was thought to be extinct for more than 150 years.

It was found on Coin de Mire, a northern island of Mauritius; its discovery raised hope in the conservation sector.

== Description and behaviour ==
It is a small scorpion, of lightish-brown colour. It measures 4–5 cm (1.6–2.0 in) and weighs around 3 g (0.11 oz). It hides in crevices or under tree bark. It is mainly nocturnal and has a painful sting, although not deadly.
