= The X Factor (Australian TV series) season 8 =

The X Factor
- Season 8
- Hosted by: Jason Dundas
- Judges: Mel B; Guy Sebastian; Iggy Azalea; Adam Lambert
- Winner: Isaiah Firebrace
- Winning mentor: Adam Lambert
- Runner-up: Davey Woder

Release
- Original network: Seven Network
- Original release: 3 October – 21 November 2016

Season chronology
- ← Previous; Season 7

The X Factor was an Australian television reality music competition, based on the original British version, to find new singing talent; the winner of which received a Sony Music Australia recording contract. The eighth season, branded as X Factor: Next Generation, premiered on Seven Network on 3 October 2016. Jason Dundas replaced Luke Jacobz as host; with the judging panel consisting of Mel B, Guy Sebastian, Iggy Azalea and Adam Lambert. The winner was Isaiah Firebrace and his winner's single "It's Gotta Be You" was released after the final. He was mentored by Lambert, who won as mentor for the first and only time.

== Judges and Host ==
Judges and Host for The X Factor Season 8

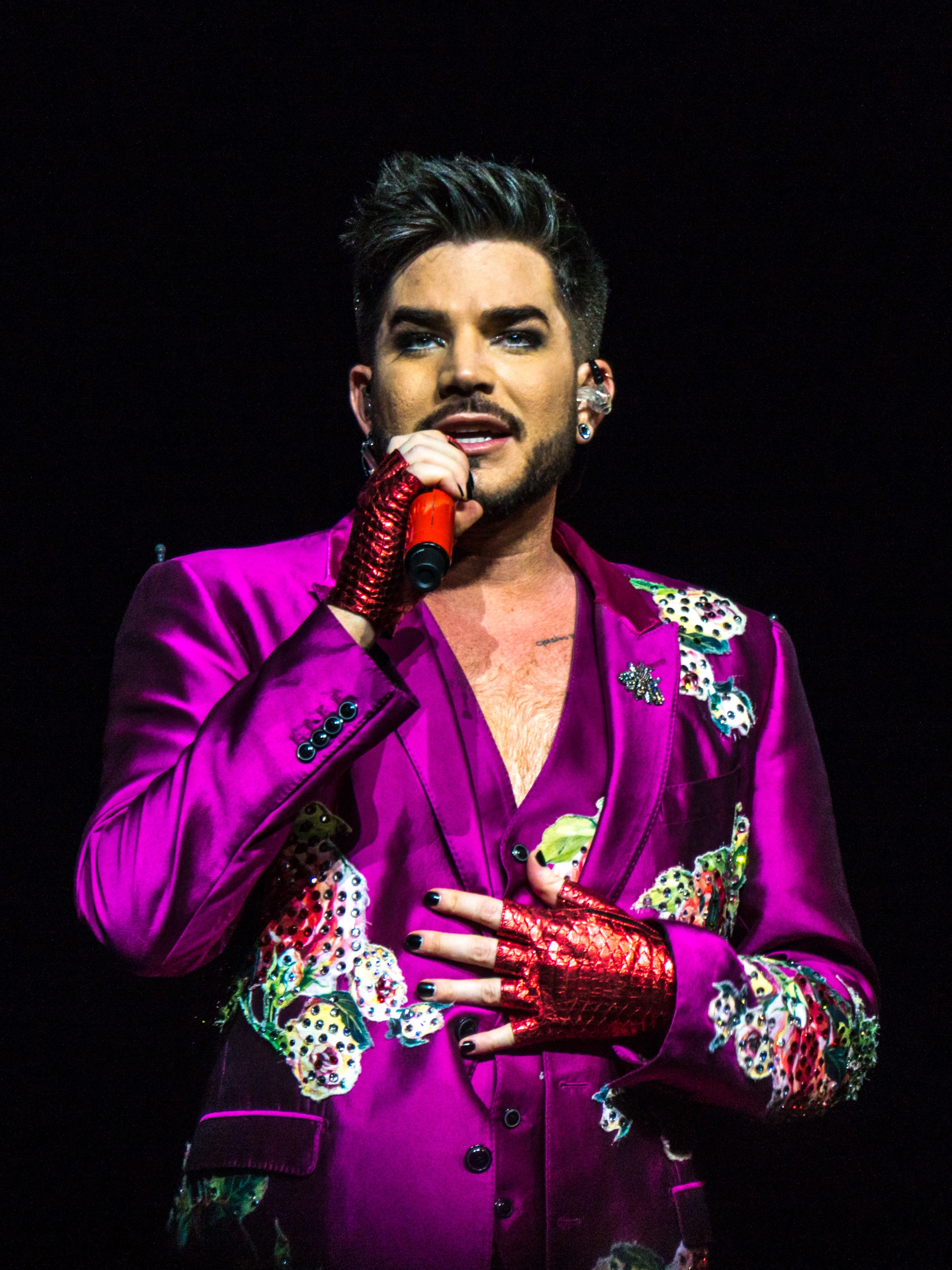
Adam Lambert

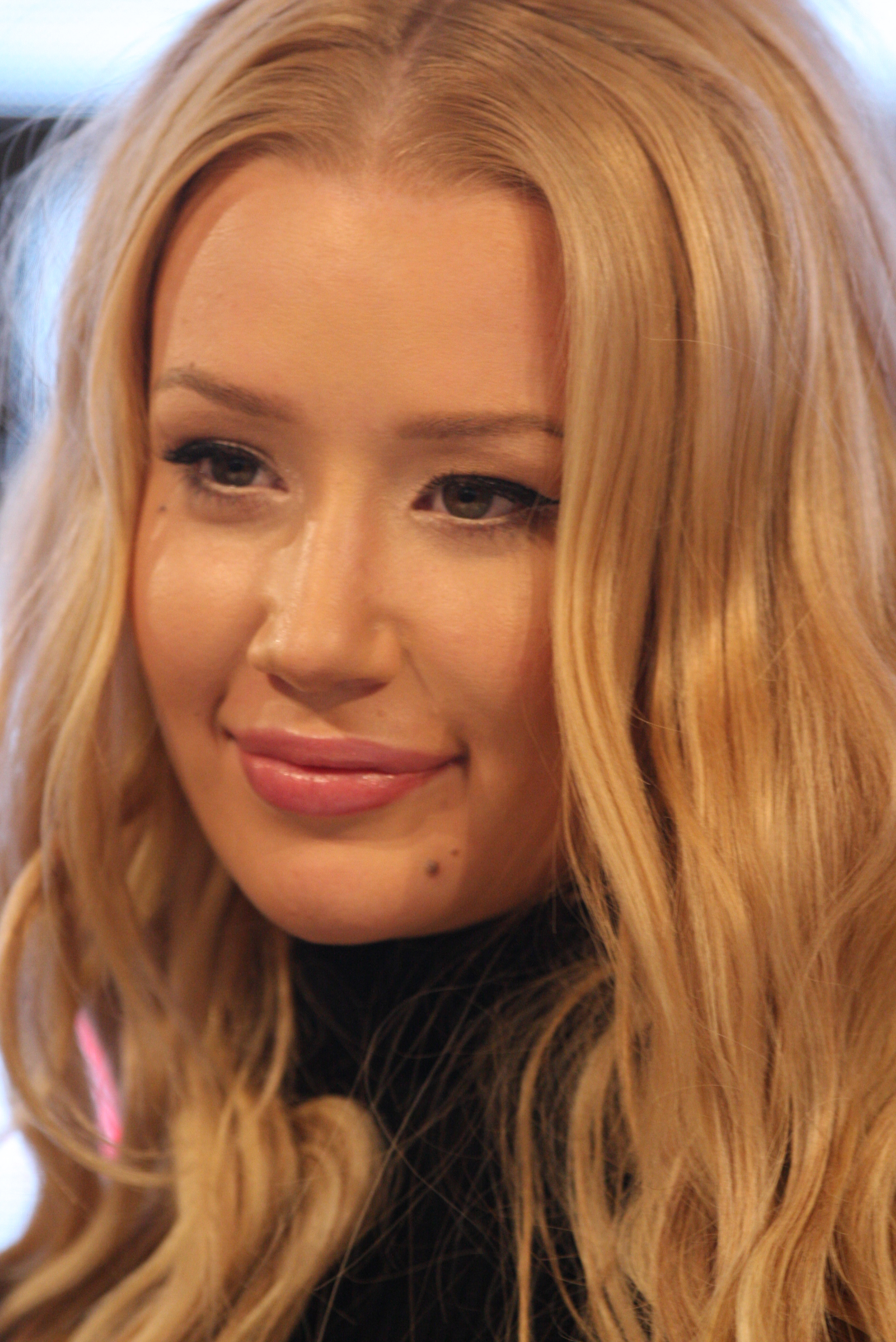
Iggy Azalea

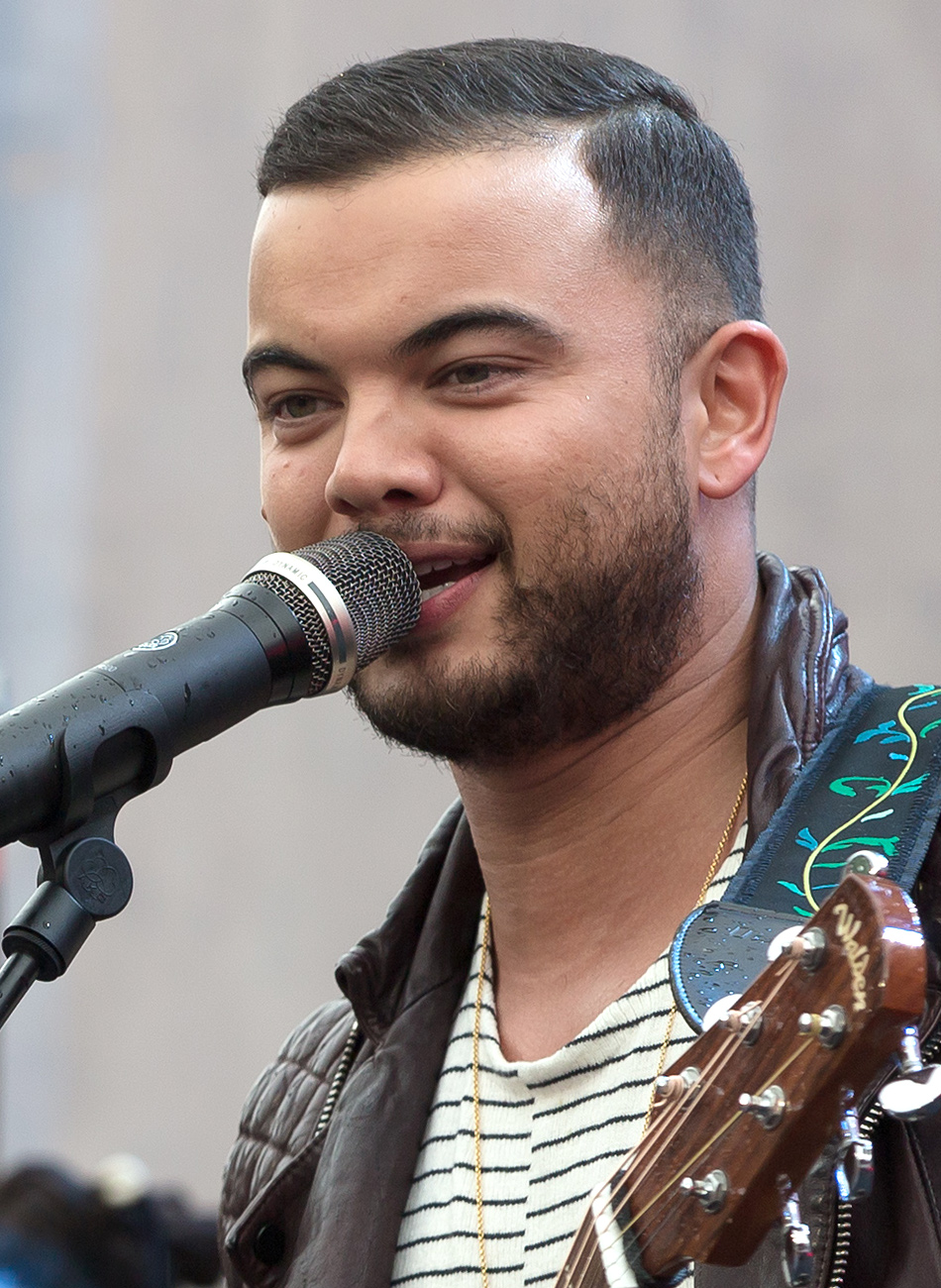
Guy Sebastian

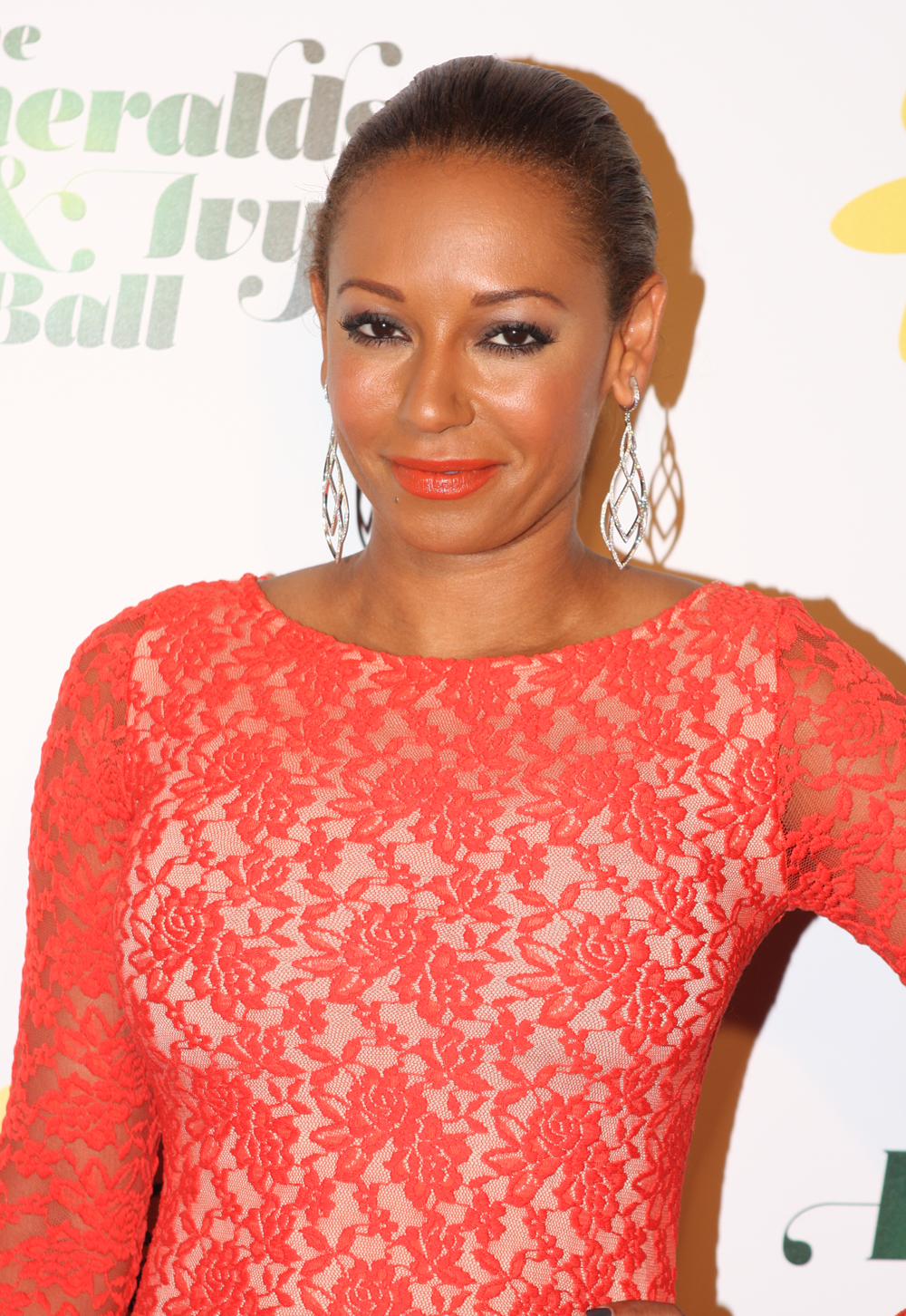
Mel B

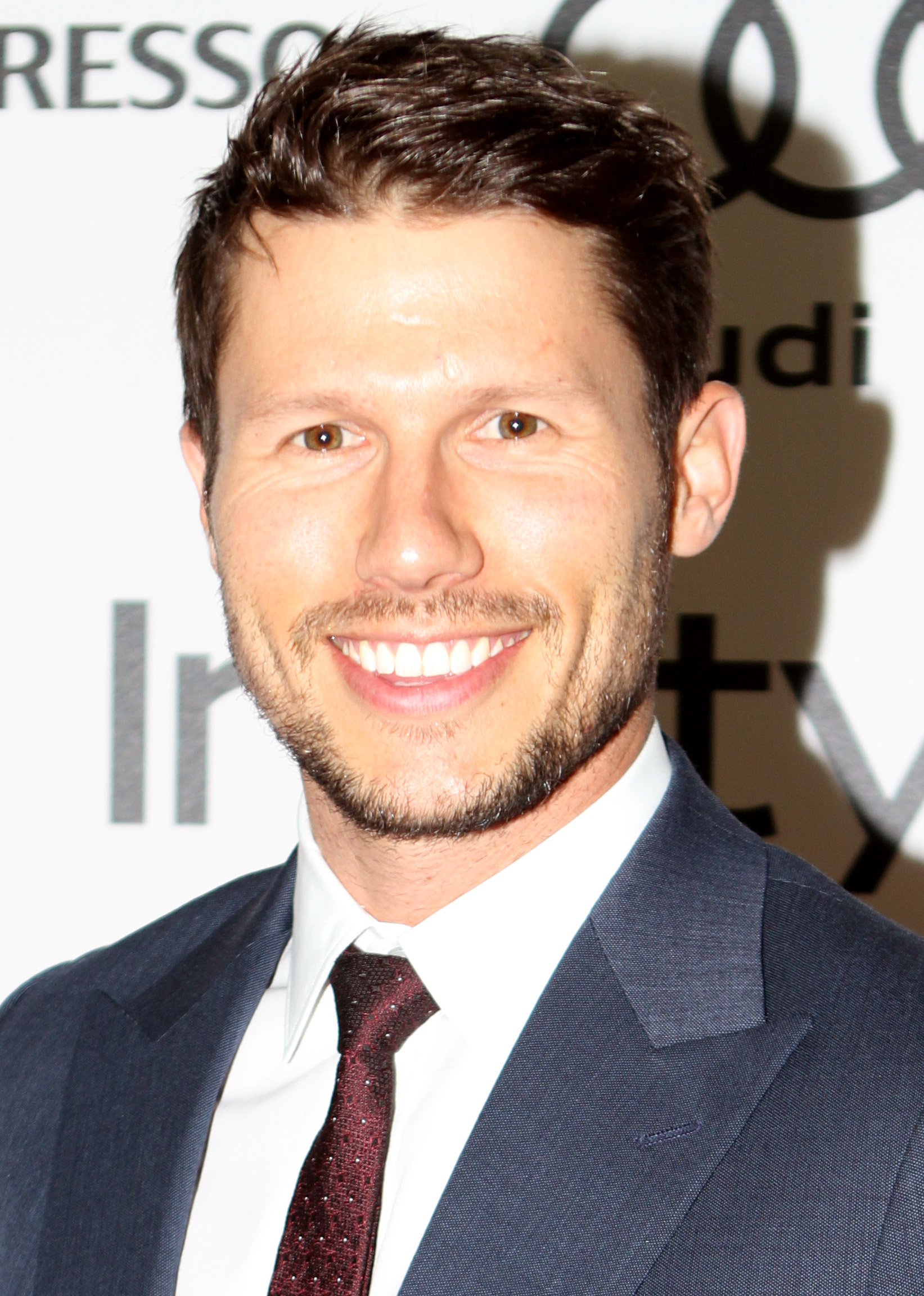
Jason Dundas

In February 2016, reports claimed that Seven Network was mulling over whether or not to delay the series' planned season 8 until 2017. It was later confirmed that The X Factor would return in 2016.

Dannii Minogue reported that she would not be returning to the programme after three series on the judging panel. On 12 June 2016, Iggy Azalea was announced as Chris Isaak's replacement, with Guy Sebastian. The following day, Adam Lambert was confirmed to be the third judge for season 8 replacing James Blunt. On 11 October 2016, shortly before the three-seat challenge, former judge Mel B was announced as the "underdog judge" also to replace Minogue, after months of rumours, whereby three acts who failed to secure a seat in this challenge can be recruited by her for inclusion in the "underdogs" category.

On 24 November 2015, Luke Jacobz announced on his Twitter account that he would not be returning as the host for the eighth season in 2016. On 25 June 2016, Jason Dundas was announced as Jacobz's replacement.

== Selection process ==
Open auditions in front of the show's producers took place in 17 cities and ran from 18 April to 21 May 2016.

=== Auditions ===
==== Open auditions ====
Open auditions began on 18 April in Geelong and concluded on 21 May 2016 in Melbourne.

City	Dates	Venue
Geelong	18 April 2016	Novotel Geelong
Ballarat	19 April 2016	Mercure Ballarat
Bendigo	20 April 2016	All Seasons Bendigo
Wagga Wagga	21 April 2016	Commercial Club
Orange	22 April 2016	Orange Ex-Services Club
Gosford	26 April 2016	The Youth Arts Warehouse, Regional Youth Support Services Inc
Port Macquarie	27 April 2016	Rydges Port Macquarie
Gold Coast	30 April 2016	Brisbane Sofitel
Toowoomba	2 May 2016	Burke & Wills Hotel
Bundaberg	3 May 2016	Brothers Sports Club
Sydney	7 May 2016	Sydney Olympic Park
Cairns	11 May 2016	Shangri-La Hotel
Darwin	13 May 2016	Oaks Elan Darwin
Perth	15 May 2016	Parmelia Hilton Perth
Bunbury	17 May 2016	Mercure Sanctuary Resort
Adelaide	19 May 2016	AAMI Stadium
Melbourne	21 May 2016	Melbourne Convention & Exhibition Center

==== Judges' auditions ====
Judges' auditions took at Sydney Olympic Park from 29 June to 1 July and again from 5 to 6 July 2016.

City	Dates	Venue
Sydney	29 June to 1 July 2016	Sydney Olympic Park
Sydney	5 to 6 July 2016	Sydney Olympic Park

=== Bootcamp ===
Bootcamp was briefly shown during the last audition episode, where the judges found out which category they would mentor. Once the judges found out their categories, they had each of their acts sing acapella for their judge and once everyone sang, the category judge narrowed their category down to 12 acts who would move on to the Three Chair Challenge.

=== Three seat challenge ===
The three seat challenge round of the competition was held at the Sydney Olympic Park between 28 and 29 July 2016. This will be a replacement as the super home visits used in previous seasons. Three acts who were not successful were recruited by underdog judge Mel B.

Key:

– Act was immediately eliminated after performance without given a seat
– Act was given a seat but swapped out later in the competition and eventually eliminated
– Act was given a seat and made the top three of their own category
– Act did not make the top three of their own category but was later saved by Mel B

Contestants performances on the three-seat challenge
Episode	Category (mentor)	Act	Order	Song	Mentor's decision	Swapped with
Episode 6 (11 October)	14-21s (Lambert)	Isaiah Firebrace	1	"If I Ain't Got You"	Put in seat 1	—
Episode 7 (16 October)	14-21s (Lambert)	Bailey Spalding	2	"Heroes"	Put in seat 2	—
Episode 7 (16 October)	14-21s (Lambert)	Maddison Milewski	3	"Who Wants to Live Forever"	Put in seat 3	—
Episode 7 (16 October)	14-21s (Lambert)	Benny Nelson	4	"Every Little Thing She Does Is Magic"	Eliminated	—
Episode 7 (16 October)	14-21s (Lambert)	James Kernick	5	"If I Ain't Got You"	Eliminated	—
Episode 7 (16 October)	14-21s (Lambert)	Veronica Bravo	6	"Should've Been Us"	Eliminated	—
Episode 7 (16 October)	14-21s (Lambert)	Vlado Saric	7	"Wildest Dreams"	Put in seat 3	Maddison Milewski
Episode 7 (16 October)	14-21s (Lambert)	Janae Rosa	8	"I'd Rather Go Blind"	Eliminated	—
Episode 7 (16 October)	14-21s (Lambert)	Mi-kaisha Masella	9	"Sledgehammer"	Eliminated	—
Episode 7 (16 October)	14-21s (Lambert)	Ivy Adara	10	"Remind Me"	Put in seat 3	Vlado Saric
Episode 7 (16 October)	14-21s (Lambert)	Amalia Foy	11	"Piece by Piece"	Put in seat 2	Bailey Spalding
Episode 7 (16 October)	14-21s (Lambert)	Natalie Ong	12	"I'd Rather Go Blind"	Put in seat 3	Ivy Adara
Episode 8 (17 October)	Groups (Azalea)	Beatz	13	"Me Too"	Put in seat 1	—
Episode 8 (17 October)	Groups (Azalea)	Fifth Element	14	"FourFiveSeconds"	Eliminated	—
Episode 8 (17 October)	Groups (Azalea)	Brentwood	15	"Lush Life"	Put in seat 2	—
Episode 8 (17 October)	Groups (Azalea)	IndiElla	16	"Don't Worry About Me"	Put in seat 3	—
Episode 8 (17 October)	Groups (Azalea)	Aroza	17	"See You Again"	Eliminated	—
Episode 8 (17 October)	Groups (Azalea)	The Dennis Sisters	18	"Fire and the Flood"	Eliminated	—
Episode 8 (17 October)	Groups (Azalea)	FD3	19	"Waiting for a Star to Fall"	Eliminated	—
Episode 8 (17 October)	Groups (Azalea)	Time & Place	20	"You Don't Know Love"	Put in seat 3	IndiElla
Episode 8 (17 October)	Groups (Azalea)	Montage	21	"Break Free"	Put in seat 1	Beatz
Episode 9 (18 October)	Over 22s (Sebastian)	Ruby Mills	22	"When We Were Young"	Put in seat 1	—
Episode 9 (18 October)	Over 22s (Sebastian)	Calvin Orosa	23	"Can't Stop the Feeling!"	Put in seat 2	—
Episode 9 (18 October)	Over 22s (Sebastian)	Davey Woder	24	"Stand by Me"	Put in seat 3	—
Episode 9 (18 October)	Over 22s (Sebastian)	Trojahn Tuna	25	"Send My Love (To Your New Lover)"	Eliminated	—
Episode 9 (18 October)	Over 22s (Sebastian)	Stevie-Leigh	26	"California Dreamin'"	Eliminated	—
Episode 9 (18 October)	Over 22s (Sebastian)	Josh	27	"Human"	Eliminated	—
Episode 9 (18 October)	Over 22s (Sebastian)	Omar Terzic	28	"To Love Somebody"	Eliminated	—
Episode 9 (18 October)	Over 22s (Sebastian)	Naisa Lasalosi	29	"Love Me Harder"	Put in seat 2	Calvin Orosa
Episode 9 (18 October)	Over 22s (Sebastian)	Zebulen Howell	30	"Stole the Show"	Put in seat 1	Ruby Mills
Episode 9 (18 October)	Over 22s (Sebastian)	Miss Powers	31	"Fame"	Eliminated	—
Episode 9 (18 October)	Over 22s (Sebastian)	Dave Stergo	32	"Running Up That Hill"	Eliminated	—
Episode 9 (18 October)	Over 22s (Sebastian)	Chynna Taylor	33	"My Hero"	Put in seat 2	Naisa Lasalosi
Episode 9 (18 October)	Over 22s (Sebastian)	Timmy Knowles	34	"Love on the Brain"	Put in seat 1	Zebulen Howell

== Acts ==
Key:

– Winner
– Runner-up

Act	Age(s)	Hometown	Category (mentor)	Result
Isaiah Firebrace	17	Portland, Victoria	14-21s (Lambert)	Winner
Davey Woder	34	Logan, Queensland	Over 22s (Sebastian)	Runner-up
Vlado	17	Sydney	Underdogs (Mel B)	3rd place
Amalia Foy	14	Melbourne	14-21s (Lambert)	4th place
BEATZ	19–22	Sydney	Underdogs (Mel B)	5th place
Chynna Taylor	26	Corpus Christi, Texas, United States/South Coast, New South Wales	Over 22s (Sebastian)	6th place
Brentwood	25 & 29	New Zealand/Melbourne	Groups (Azalea)	7th place
AYA	16–18	Sydney	Groups (Azalea)	8th place
Maddison Milewski	16	Gold Coast, Queensland	Underdogs (Mel B)	9th–12th place
Timmy Knowles	30	Melbourne	Over 22s (Sebastian)	9th–12th place
Time and Place	17–21	Various	Groups (Azalea)	9th–12th place
Natalie Ong	15	Singapore/Melbourne	14-21s (Lambert)	9th–12th place

*AYA (originally named Chai) was previously known as Montage. Their name was changed a second time after the three-seat challenge.

== Live shows ==
The live shows began airing on 23 October 2016. Initially, ten live shows were planned, but they were cut down to five, apparently due to scheduling conflicts. Guy Sebastian mentored the Over 22s, Iggy Azalea mentored the Groups and Adam Lambert mentored the 14-21s. Mel B was announced as the mentor of the Underdogs category, where she chose three acts who were eliminated in the three-seat challenge, join her category; the contestants of this category were not revealed until the first live show. The live shows concluded on 21 November 2016, where this would be the final episode of The X Factor to be aired, as the programme was cancelled in January 2017 due to declining ratings.

=== Results summary ===
Colour key

Act in Team Mel B
Act in Team Guy
Act in Team Iggy
Act in Team Adam

– Act in the bottom two and had to perform again in the final showdown
– Act was in the bottom three but received the fewest votes and was immediately eliminated
– Act received the fewest public votes and was immediately eliminated (no final showdown)

Weekly results per act
Act	Week 1^{1}	Week 2	Quarter-final	Semi-final	Final	
Act	Week 1^{1}	Week 2	Quarter-final	Semi-final	Sunday Vote	Monday Vote
Isaiah Firebrace	Safe	Safe	Safe	Safe	Safe	Winner
Davey Woder	Safe	Safe	Safe	Safe	Safe	Runner-up
Vlado Saric	Safe	Safe	Safe	Bottom Two	3rd	Eliminated (Final)
Amalia Foy	Safe	Safe	Safe	Safe	4th	Eliminated (Final)
Beatz	Safe	7th	5th	Bottom Two	Eliminated (Semi-final)	
Chynna Taylor	Safe	Safe	6th	Eliminated (Quarter-final)		
Brentwood	Safe	Safe	7th	Eliminated (Quarter-final)		
AYA	Safe	8th	Eliminated (Week 2)			
Maddison Milewski	Eliminated	Eliminated (Week 1)				
Timmy Knowles	Eliminated	Eliminated (Week 1)				
Time and Place	Eliminated	Eliminated (Week 1)				
Natalie Ong	Eliminated	Eliminated (Week 1)				
Final Showdown	No final showdown; public eliminates one act from each category	Beatz, AYA	Chynna Taylor, Beatz	Beatz, Saric	No bottom two/judges' vote; public votes alone decide who wins	
Judges voted to	No final showdown; public eliminates one act from each category	Eliminate		Send Through	No bottom two/judges' vote; public votes alone decide who wins	
Lambert's vote (14-21s)	No final showdown; public eliminates one act from each category	Beatz	Beatz	Saric	No bottom two/judges' vote; public votes alone decide who wins	
Azalea's vote (Groups)	No final showdown; public eliminates one act from each category	Beatz	Taylor	Saric	No bottom two/judges' vote; public votes alone decide who wins	
Sebastian's vote (Over 22s)	No final showdown; public eliminates one act from each category	AYA	Beatz	Saric	No bottom two/judges' vote; public votes alone decide who wins	
Mel B's vote (Underdogs)	No final showdown; public eliminates one act from each category	AYA	Taylor	—N/a^{2}	No bottom two/judges' vote; public votes alone decide who wins	
Eliminated	Timmy Knowles; Public Vote To Save	AYA; 2 of 4 votes Deadlock	Brentwood; Public Vote To Save	Beatz; 0 of 3 votes Minority	Vlado Saric; Public Vote To Save	Davey Woder; Public Vote To Win
Eliminated	Maddison Milewski; Public Vote To Save	AYA; 2 of 4 votes Deadlock	Brentwood; Public Vote To Save	Beatz; 0 of 3 votes Minority	Vlado Saric; Public Vote To Save	Davey Woder; Public Vote To Win
Eliminated	Natalie Ong; Public Vote To Save	AYA; 2 of 4 votes Deadlock	Chynna Taylor; 2 of 4 votes Deadlock	Beatz; 0 of 3 votes Minority	Amalia Foy; Public Vote to Save	Davey Woder; Public Vote To Win
Eliminated	Time and Place; Public Vote To Save	AYA; 2 of 4 votes Deadlock	Chynna Taylor; 2 of 4 votes Deadlock	Beatz; 0 of 3 votes Minority	Amalia Foy; Public Vote to Save	Davey Woder; Public Vote To Win

Notes

- ^{1} In week 1, one act from each category was eliminated, hence each category was ranked individually.
- ^{2} Mel B was not required to vote as there was already a Majority.

=== Live show details ===
==== Week 1 (23/24 October) ====
- Theme: Judges' Choice (Free Choice)
- Group performance: "Battle Scars"/"Fancy"/"Whataya Want from Me"/"Wannabe"
- Celebrity performers: Jessica Mauboy ("Flame Trees") and Zara Larsson ("Ain't My Fault")

One act from each category was eliminated from the competition after the first show, as voted by viewers

Acts' performances on the first live show
Act	Category (mentor)	Order	Song	Result
Beatz	Underdogs (Mel B)	1	"Sax"	Safe
Timmy Knowles	Over 22s (Sebastian)	2	"Hands to Myself"	Eliminated
Amalia Foy	14-21s (Lambert)	3	"Angel"	Safe
Time and Place	Groups (Azalea)	4	"Ride"	Eliminated
Chynna Taylor	Over 22s (Sebastian)	5	"Open Arms"	Safe
Maddison Milewski	Underdogs (Mel B)	6	"Addicted to You"	Eliminated
Isaiah Firebrace	14-21s (Lambert)	7	"Lay It All on Me"	Safe
AYA	Groups (Azalea)	8	"Secret Love Song"	Safe
Vlado	Underdogs (Mel B)	9	"Closer"	Safe
Brentwood	Groups (Azalea)	10	"Say It"	Safe
Davey Woder	Over 22s (Sebastian)	11	"With a Little Help from My Friends"	Safe
Natalie Ong	14-21s (Lambert)	12	"When Love Takes Over"	Eliminated

==== Week 2 (30/31 October) ====
- Theme: Judges' Makeovers (Free Choice)
- Group performance: "Money Maker" with Throttle, LunchMoney Lewis and Aston Merrygold
- Celebrity performers: Adam Lambert ("Evil In The Night") and Shawn Mendes ("Mercy")

Acts' performances on the second live show
Act	Category (mentor)	Order	Song	Result
AYA	Groups (Azalea)	1	"End of Time"	Bottom Two
Vlado	Underdogs (Mel B)	2	"Into You"	Safe
Chynna Taylor	Over 22s (Sebastian)	3	"Pride (In the Name of Love)"	Safe
Amalia Foy	14-21s (Lambert)	4	"Frozen"	Safe
Brentwood	Groups (Azalea)	5	"Latch"	Safe
Davey Woder	Over 22s (Sebastian)	6	"Small Bump"	Safe
Beatz	Underdogs (Mel B)	7	"If You Love Me"/"Whip My Hair"	Bottom Two
Isaiah Firebrace	14-21s (Lambert)	8	"Let It Be"	Safe
Final showdown details
Act	Category (mentor)	Order	Song	Result
Beatz	Underdogs (Mel B)	1	"Bang Bang"	Safe
AYA	Groups (Azalea)	2	"Domino"	Eliminated

Judges' vote to eliminate

- Mel B: AYA – backed her own act, Beatz.
- Azalea: Beatz – backed her own act, AYA.
- Lambert: Beatz – said AYA had stronger vocals.
- Sebastian: AYA – could not decide and sent the result to deadlock.

With the acts in the bottom two receiving two votes each, the result went to deadlock and reverted to the earlier public vote. AYA were eliminated as the act with the fewest public votes.

==== Week 3: Quarter-Final (6/7 November) ====
- Theme: Viewers' Choice
- Guest mentors: Dami Im, Jess & Matt, Samantha Jade, Jai Waetford, Cyrus and Taylor Henderson
- Group performance: "Sound of Silence"
- Celebrity performers: Dami Im ("Fighting for Love"), Guy Sebastian ("Set in Stone"), Disturbed ("The Sound of Silence")

The viewers were given the power to choose this week's songs.

Dundas confirmed during Sunday's live show that this week would be a double elimination.

Song choices for the jukebox theme
Act	Category (mentor)	Song Choices	Result
Amalia Foy	14-21s (Lambert)	"You've Got the Love"	Not Chosen
Amalia Foy	14-21s (Lambert)	"Mamma Mia"	Chosen
Beatz	Underdogs (Mel B)	"Single Ladies (Put a Ring on It)"	Chosen
Beatz	Underdogs (Mel B)	"I Gotta Feeling"	Not Chosen
Brentwood	Groups (Azalea)	"September"	Not Chosen
Brentwood	Groups (Azalea)	"Go Your Own Way"	Chosen
Chynna Taylor	Over 22s (Sebastian)	"Mercy"	Chosen
Chynna Taylor	Over 22s (Sebastian)	"The Horses"	Not Chosen
Davey Woder	Over 22s (Sebastian)	"Working Class Man"	Chosen
Davey Woder	Over 22s (Sebastian)	"Better Man"	Not Chosen
Isaiah Firebrace	14-21s (Lambert)	"No Woman, No Cry"	Not Chosen
Isaiah Firebrace	14-21s (Lambert)	"Happy"	Chosen
Vlado	Underdogs (Mel B)	"Love Yourself"	Not Chosen
Vlado	Underdogs (Mel B)	"Thriller"	Chosen

Acts' performances in the quarter-final
Act	Category (mentor)	Order	Song	Result
Chynna Taylor	Over 22s (Sebastian)	1	"Mercy"	Bottom Three
Brentwood	Groups (Azalea)	2	"Go Your Own Way"	Eliminated
Beatz	Underdogs (Mel B)	3	"Single Ladies (Put a Ring on It)"	Bottom Three
Amalia Foy	14-21s (Lambert)	4	"Mamma Mia"	Safe
Davey Woder	Over 22s (Sebastian)	5	"Working Class Man"	Safe
Isaiah Firebrace	14-21s (Lambert)	6	"Happy"	Safe
Vlado	Underdogs (Mel B)	7	"Thriller"	Safe
Final showdown details
Act	Category (mentor)	Order	Song	Result
Chynna Taylor	Over 22s (Sebastian)	1	"What's Up?"	Eliminated
Beatz	Underdogs (Mel B)	2	"Fighter"	Safe

Judges' vote to eliminate

- Sebastian: Beatz – backed his own act, Chynna Taylor.
- Mel B: Chynna Taylor – backed her own act, Beatz.
- Azalea: Chynna Taylor – wanted a group to stay in the competition.
- Lambert: Beatz – could not decide and sent the result to deadlock.

With the acts in the bottom two receiving two votes each, the result went to deadlock and reverted to the earlier public vote. Chynna Taylor was eliminated as the act with the fewest public votes.

==== Week 4: Semi-Final (13/14 November) ====
- Theme: Killer Tracks & Curveballs
- Group performance: "Wings"
- Celebrity performers: Little Mix ("Shout Out to My Ex"), Samantha Jade & Cyrus Villanueva ("Hurt Anymore") and The Veronicas ("On Your Side")

For the first time this season, the contestants will sing two songs each.

Acts' performances in the semi-final
Act	Category (mentor)	Order	Killer Track Song	Order	Curveball Song	Result
Davey Woder	Over 22s (Sebastian)	1	"Fortunate Son"	6	"Billie Jean"	Safe
Amalia Foy	14-21s (Lambert)	2	"Brave"	9	"Faded"	Safe
Vlado	Underdogs (Mel B)	7	"Perfect Strangers"	3	"I Wanna Dance with Somebody (Who Loves Me)"	Bottom Two
Isaiah Firebrace	14-21s (Lambert)	8	"A Change Is Gonna Come"	4	"FourFiveSeconds"	Safe
Beatz	Underdogs (Mel B)	5	"Move"	10	"Walk This Way"	Bottom Two
Final showdown details
Act	Category (mentor)	Order	Song			Result
Beatz	Underdogs (Mel B)	1	"Survivor"			Eliminated
Vlado	Underdogs (Mel B)	2	"Cold Water"			Safe

Judges' vote to send through

- Lambert: Vlado – went with his gut.
- Azalea: Vlado – has said multiple times Vlado was her favourite in the competition.
- Sebastian: Vlado – also trusted his gut feeling.
- Mel B was not required to vote as there was already a majority and did not say how she would have voted as both acts were in her category.

==== Week 5: Final (20/21 November) ====
20 November

- Theme: Showstoppers & Duets
- Celebrity performer: James Arthur ("Safe Inside")

Acts' performances on the Sunday Final
Act	Category (mentor)	Order	Showstopper Song	Order	Duet Song	Result
Amalia Foy	14-21s (Lambert)	1	"Set Fire to the Rain"	5	"Boom Clap" (with Charli XCX)	Eliminated in Round 1
Vlado	Underdogs (Mel B)	6	"Closer"	2	"Say You Won't Let Go" (with James Arthur)	Eliminated in Round 2
Davey Woder	Over 22s (Sebastian)	3	"7 Years"	7	"Angels" (with Robbie Williams)	Safe
Isaiah Firebrace	14-21s (Lambert)	8	"Halo"	4	"Wake Me Up" (with Jessica Mauboy)	Safe

21 November

- Theme: Winner's Songs
- Group performances:
  - "Final Song" (Top 12)
  - "Heroes (We Could Be)" (Top 12)
- Celebrity performers: Charli XCX ("After the Afterparty"), Tove Lo ("Cool Girl"), Tori Kelly ("Don't You Worry 'Bout a Thing") and Robbie Williams ("Love My Life")

Acts' performances on the Monday Final
Act	Category (mentor)	Order	Winner's Song	Result
Isaiah Firebrace	14-21s (Lambert)	1	"It's Gotta Be You"	Winner
Davey Woder	Over 22s (Sebastian)	2	"Coming Home"	Runner-up

== Reception ==
=== Ratings ===
Ratings data is from OzTAM and represents the average viewership from the 5 largest Australian metropolitan centres (Sydney, Melbourne, Brisbane, Perth and Adelaide).

X-Factor Australia (Season 8) ratings, with overnight ratings and timeshift viewers.
Week	Episode		Air date	Overnight ratings		Timeshift ratings			Source
Week	Episode		Air date	Viewers	Rank	Viewers	Overall	Rank	Source
1	1	"Auditions 1"	3 October 2016	904,000	#6	60,000	964,000	#8	
1	2	"Auditions 2"	4 October 2016	895,000	#6	45,000	940,000	#7	
1	3	"Auditions 3"	5 October 2016	809,000	#7	34,000	843,000	#8	
2	4	"Auditions 4"	9 October 2016	914,000	#7	28,000	941,000	#8	
2	5	"Auditions 5"	10 October 2016	833,000	#7	39,000	872,000	#9	
2	6	"Auditions 6"	11 October 2016	838,000	#7	43,000	881,000	#7	
3	7	"Three seat challenge 1"	16 October 2016	815,000	#5	30,000	845,000	#5	
3	8	"Three seat challenge 2"	17 October 2016	798,000	#8	43,000	841,000	#8	
3	9	"Three seat challenge 3"	18 October 2016	806,000	#8	41,000	847,000	#7	
4	10	"Live show 1"	23 October 2016	752,000	#6	30,000	782,000	#6	
4	11	"Live decider 1"	24 October 2016	756,000	#10	64,000	820,000	#9	
5	12	"Live show 2"	30 October 2016	676,000	#7	44,000	720,000	#7	
5	13	"Live decider 2"	31 October 2016	603,000	#14	54,000	657,000	#15	
6	14	"Live show 3"	6 November 2016	700,000	#7	32,000	732,000	#6	
6	15	"Live decider 3"	7 November 2016	732,000	#10	53,000	785,000	#11	
7	16	"Live show 4"	13 November 2016	559,000	#10	24,000	578,000	#9	
7	17	"Live decider 4"	14 November 2016	697,000	#11	17,000	715,000	#12	
8	18	"Live grand final"	20 November 2016	665,000	#6	24,000	677,000	#6	
8	19	"Live grand final decider"	21 November 2016	751,000	#11	27,000	779,000	#10	
