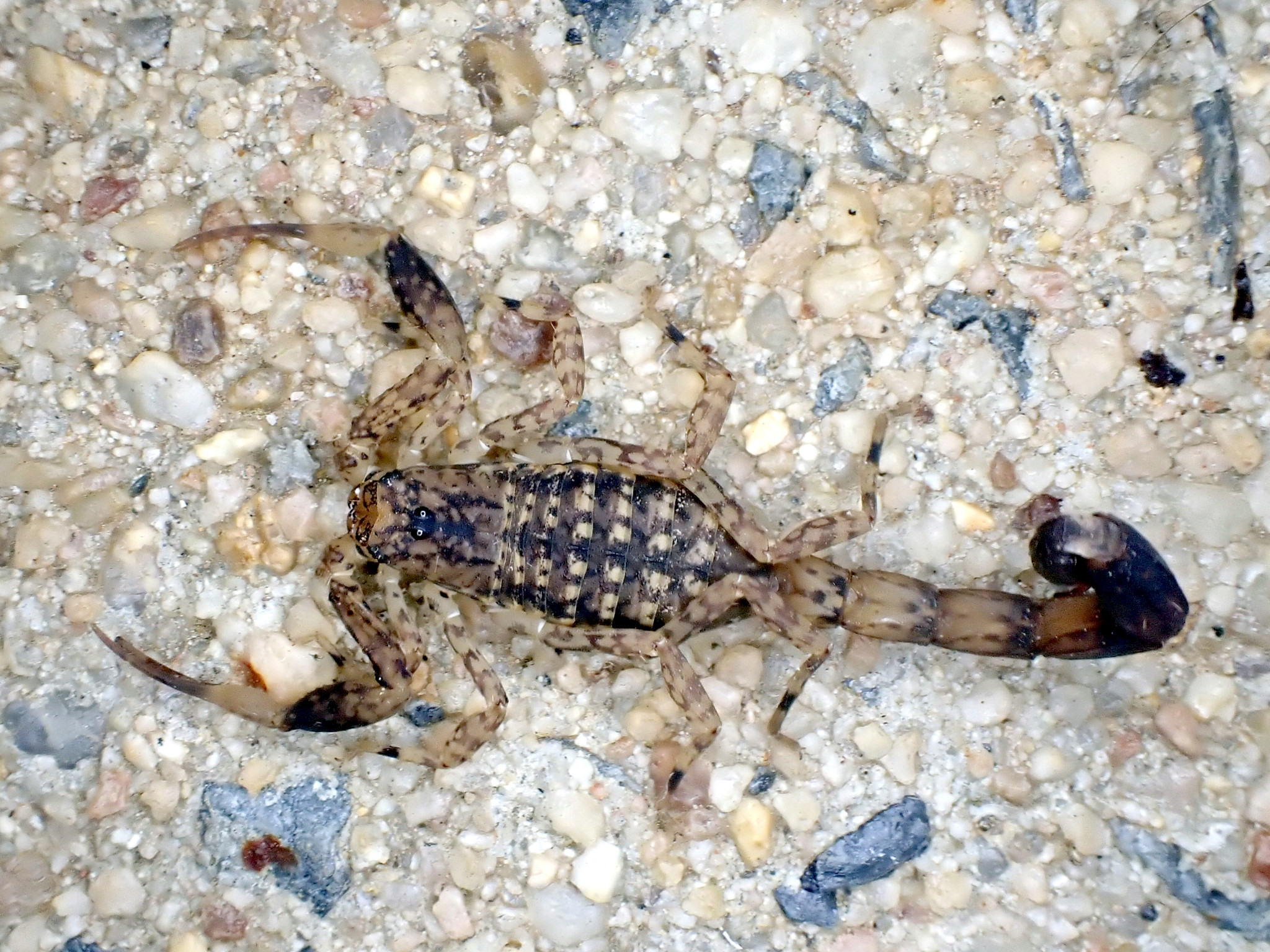

Scientific classification
- Kingdom: Animalia
- Phylum: Arthropoda
- Subphylum: Chelicerata
- Class: Arachnida
- Order: Scorpiones
- Family: Buthidae
- Genus: Lychas
- Species: L. variatus

Binomial name
- Lychas variatus (Thorell, 1877)

Synonyms
- Isometrus thorelli Keyserling, 1885; Isometrus variatus Thorell, 1877; Isometrus variatus papuanus Thorell, 1888; Isometrus armatus Pocock, 1890; Lychas marmoreus kimberleyanus Kraepelin, 1916; Lychas spinatus Kraepelin, 1916; Lychas spinatus pallidus Glauert, 1925; Lychas spinatus besti Glauert, 1925; Lychas lappa Glauert, 1954

= Lychas variatus =

Species of scorpion

Lychas variatus, also known as the marbled scorpion or splendid marbled scorpion, is a species of small scorpion in the Buthidae family. It is native to Australia and New Guinea, and was first described in 1877 by Swedish arachnologist Tamerlan Thorell.

== Description ==
The species grows to about 40 mm in length. Colouration is yellowish-brown mottled, or marbled, with light brown patches. The tail constitutes about half the length of the body, with a prong at the base of the stinger.

== Distribution and habitat ==
As well as New Guinea, the species’ range covers much of northern and eastern Australia. It prefers warm and moist environments, and shelters beneath rocks, bark and plant litter.

== Behaviour ==
The scorpions are terrestrial predators that hunt and feed on invertebrates. They may enter houses. Their sting is painful to humans but is not considered to be dangerous.

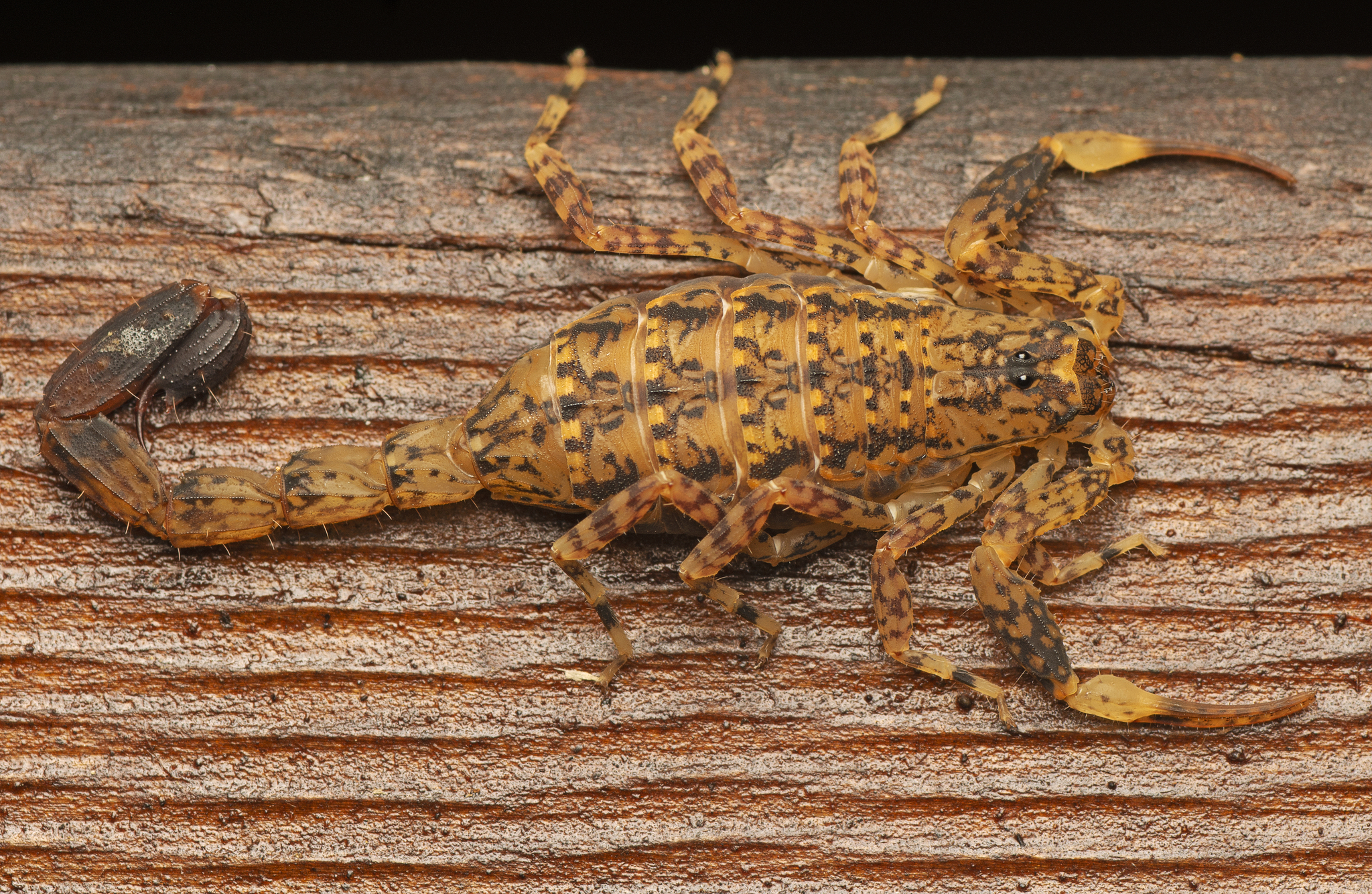
