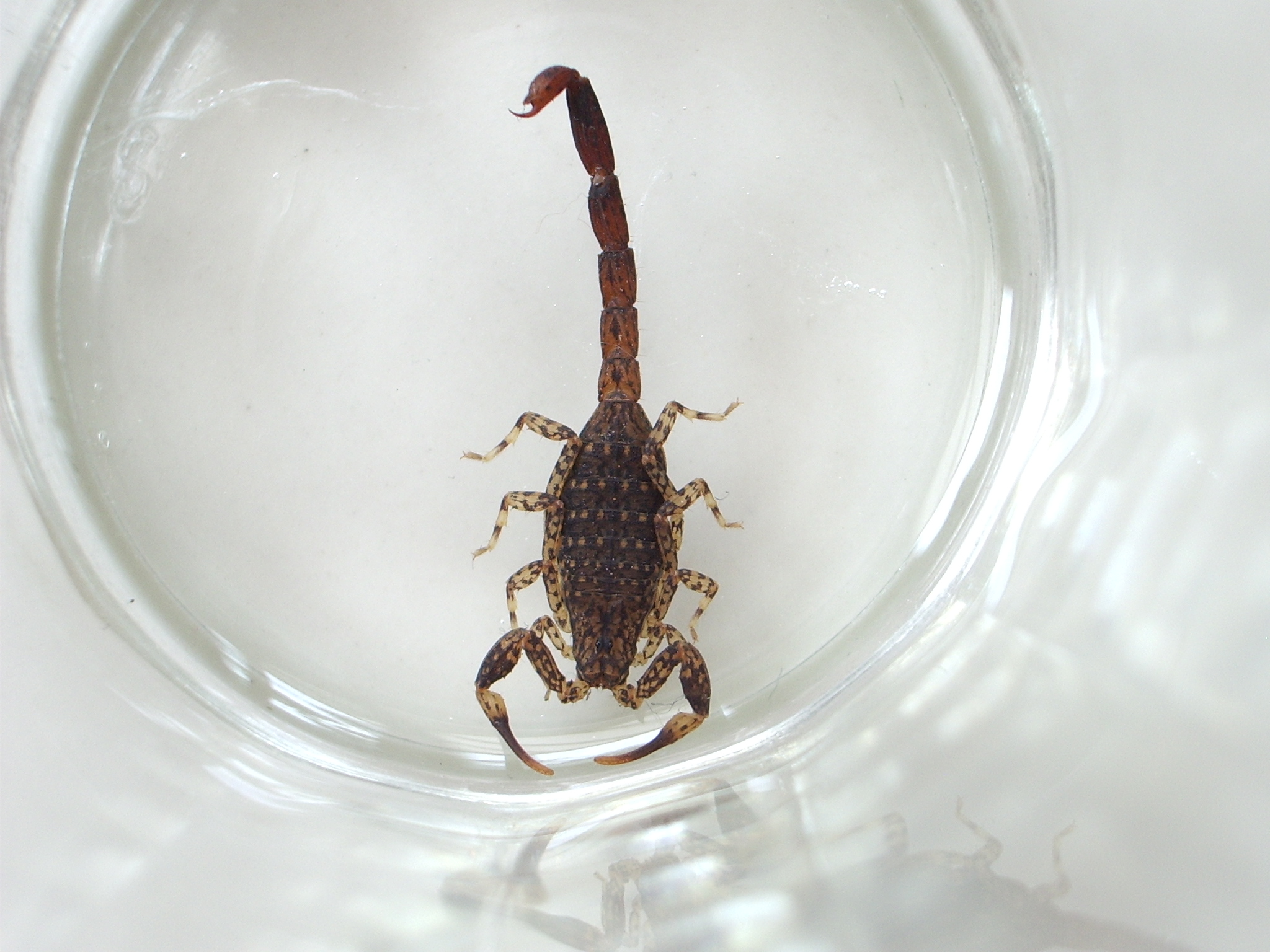
- Lychas marmoreus

Scientific classification
- Kingdom: Animalia
- Phylum: Arthropoda
- Subphylum: Chelicerata
- Class: Arachnida
- Order: Scorpiones
- Family: Buthidae
- Genus: Lychas; Koch, 1845

Type species
- Lychas scutilus C. L. Koch, 1845

Diversity
- 42 species

Synonyms
- Alterotrichus Tikader & Bastawade, 1983; Archiosometrus Stahnke, 1972; Archisometrus Kraepelin, 1891; Distotrichus Tikader & Bastawade, 1983; Endotrichus Tikader & Bastawade, 1983; Lichas Fage, 1936; Lycas Caporiacco, 1941; Pilumnus Koch, 1837; Repucha Fet, 1997; Repucha Francke, 1985

= Lychas =

Genus of scorpions

Lychas is a genus of scorpions belonging to the family Buthidae. It is one of the most widespread genus of the scorpions, where the species are found throughout in Africa and Seychelles, and in the Oriental region from India to Melanesia.

== Description ==
Total length is 21.8 to 90 mm.

== Species ==
There are about 42 species.

- Lychas aberlenci Lourenço, 2013
- Lychas americanus Koch, 1845
- Lychas annulatus Glauert, 1925
- Lychas armasi Kovarík, 2013
- Lychas armillatus (Gervais, 1841)
- Lychas asper (Pocock, 1891)
- Lychas biharensis Tikader & Bastawade, 1983
- Lychas brehieri Lourenço, 2017
- Lychas buchardi Kovarík, 1997
- Lychas buchari Kovařík, 1997
- Lychas cernickai Kovarík, 2013
- Lychas ceylonensis Lourenço & Huber, 1999
- Lychas flavimanus (Thorell, 1888)
- Lychas gravelyi Henderson, 1913
- Lychas hendersoni (Pocock, 1897)
- Lychas hillyardi Kovarík, 1997
- Lychas inexpectatus Lourenço, 2011
- Lychas jonesae Glauert, 1925
- Lychas kamshetensis Tikader & Bastawade, 1983
- Lychas kharpadi Bastawade, 1986
- Lychas krali Kovarík, 1995
- Lychas lappa Glauert, 1954
- Lychas lourencoi Kovarík, 1997
- Lychas mabillanus Rochebrune, 1884
- Lychas marmoreus (C.L.Koch, 1844)
- Lychas melanodactylus Koch, 1867
- Lychas mjobergi Kraepelin, 1916
- Lychas mucronatus (Fabricius, 1798)
- Lychas nigristernis (Pocock, 1899)
- Lychas obsti Kraepelin, 1913
- Lychas paraensis Koch, 1845
- Lychas perfidus (Keyserling, 1885)
- Lychas rackae Kovarík, 1997
- Lychas rugosus (Pocock, 1897)
- Lychas santoensis Lourenço, 2009
- Lychas scaber (Pocock, 1893)
- Lychas scutilus C.L.Koch, 1845
- Lychas serratus (Pocock, 1891)
- Lychas shelfordi (Borelli, 1904)
- Lychas spinatus Kraepelin, 1916
- Lychas srilankensis Lorenco, 1997
- Lychas truncatus Glauert, 1925
- Lychas variatus (Thorell, 1876)
