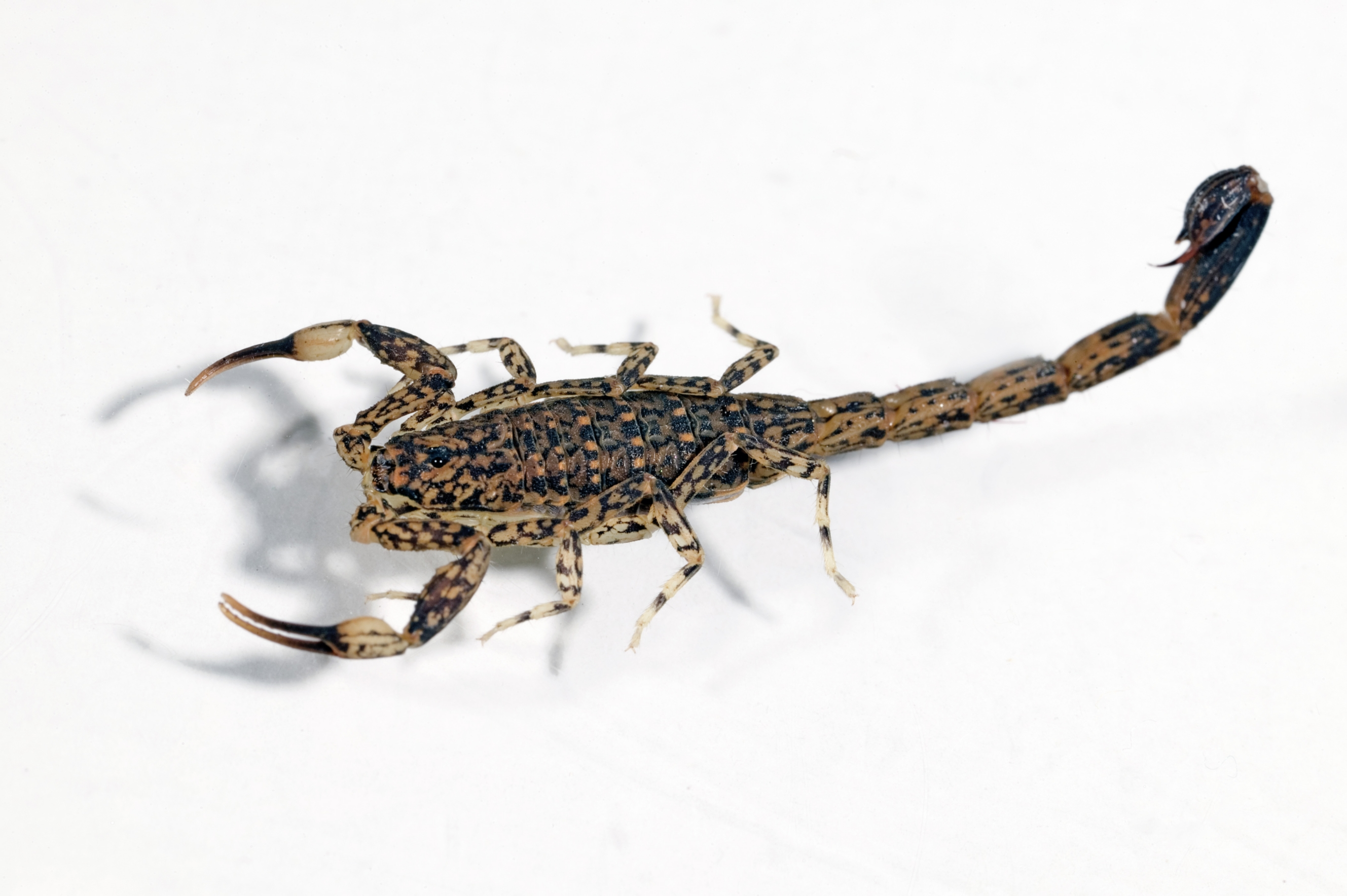

Scientific classification
- Kingdom: Animalia
- Phylum: Arthropoda
- Subphylum: Chelicerata
- Class: Arachnida
- Order: Scorpiones
- Family: Buthidae
- Genus: Lychas
- Species: L. marmoreus

Binomial name
- Lychas marmoreus (C.L.Koch, 1845)

Synonyms
- Tityus marmoreus C.L. Koch, 1845; Isometrus bituberculatus Pocock, 1891; Lychas marmoreus nigrescens Kraepelin, 1916; Lychas marmoreus obscurus Kraepelin, 1916; Lychas marmoreus splendens Kraepelin, 1916; Lychas marmoreus lucienkochi Fet, 1997

= Lychas marmoreus =

Species of scorpion

Lychas marmoreus, also known as the marbled scorpion, little marbled scorpion or bark scorpion, is a species of small scorpion in the Buthidae family. It is native to Australia, and was first described in 1845 by German arachnologist Carl Ludwig Koch.

== Description ==
The scorpions grow to about 40 mm in length, with the tail longer than the body. Base colouration is brownish-yellow, overlaid with a dark brown to black mottled, or marbled, pattern. The stinger and tip of the tail are dark brown.

== Distribution and habitat ==
The species occurs across much of southern mainland Australia, especially the cooler and wetter parts, including urban areas. The scorpions shelter beneath stones and bark, in plant litter, and may enter houses.

== Behaviour ==
The scorpions hunt and feed on small invertebrates, especially termites. The sting can cause several hours of pain and inflammation in humans, and sometimes an allergic reaction, but is not usually considered dangerous.
