= Lay It All on Me (song) =

Single by Rudimental featuring Ed Sheeran

from the album We the Generation and x (Wembley Edition)
- Released: 25 September 2015
- Recorded: 2015
- Genre: Deep house; soul
- Length: 4:02
- Label: Asylum; Atlantic
- Songwriters: Amir Izadkhah; Piers Aggett; Kesi Dryden; James Newman; Edward Sheeran; Gavin Slate; Leon "DJ Locksmith" Rolle; Adam Eaglefield; Lasse Petersen; Maxwell McElligott; Jonny "Ghostwriter" Harris; Jacob Manson; James Luke Wood
- Producers: Rudimental; Ben "Freeze" Humphreys; Mike Spencer

Rudimental singles chronology
"Rumour Mill" (2015)	"Lay It All on Me" (2015)	"Common Emotion" (2016)

Ed Sheeran singles chronology
"Photograph" (2015)	"Lay It All on Me" (2015)	"Castle on the Hill" / "Shape of You" (2017)

"Lay It All on Me" is a song by British drum and bass band Rudimental, featuring guest vocals from English singer and songwriter Ed Sheeran. The song was released as a single for Rudimental's second album, We the Generation (2015). On 24 September 2015, the band debuted the song on BBC Radio 1. It became available on streaming and downloading services the following day.

== Background ==
Prior to "Lay It All on Me", Rudimental had previously collaborated with Sheeran, co-writing the song "Bloodstream" which appeared on the latter's 2014 album, x. The track was re-worked and released as the fourth single from x as well as the lead single from We the Generation.

The idea for "Lay It All on Me" was already in concept prior to Rudimental touring with Sheeran, providing opening support for the latter's American leg of his x tour. While on the tour bus, Rudimental played the song for Sheeran. According to Rudimental, Sheeran liked it and they ended up completing the song while in London.

The song is "about sticking together and brotherhood". Writing the song, Rudimental's inspiration was evoked by the fact of being away from home and family. The electronic track has a "pulsating" beat.

The official remix was released on 14 December 2015 featuring additional verses from Big Sean and Vic Mensa with a slightly different instrumental beat.

== Chart performance ==
On the chart dated 17 October 2015, the song debuted on the Billboard Hot 100 at number 96, becoming Rudimental's first charting entry in the US, eventually peaking at number 48. The song debuted on the UK Singles Chart at number 16, giving Rudimental their eighth top 40. The following week, it reached a new peak of number 15. So far it has peaked at number 12.

== Music video ==
The official music video was uploaded to Rudimental's YouTube channel on 6 November 2015.

== Credits and personnel ==
Rudimental

- Amir Amor – guitar, backing vocals, programming
- Kesi Dryden - bass guitar, strings, backing vocals
- Leon "Locksmith" Rolle - keyboards, percussion, backing vocals, producer
- Piers Aggett - piano, synthesizers, backing vocals, producer

Session musicians/songwriters

- Ed Sheeran – lead vocals
- Mark Crown – trumpet
- Anne-Marie – backing vocals
- Raphaella – backing vocals
- Ben "Freeze" Humphreys – producer
- Mike Spencer – producer, programming

Production

- Stuart Hawkes – engineer
- Wez Clarke – mix engineer, programmer
- Mark "Spike" Stent - mix engineer

== Charts and certifications ==
=== Weekly charts ===
Chart (2015–2016)	Peak position
Australia (ARIA)	7
Austria (Ö3 Austria Top 40)	23
Belgium (Ultratop 50 Flanders)	47
Belgium (Ultratop 50 Wallonia)	24
Canada Hot 100 (Billboard)	29
Canada AC (Billboard)	13
Canada CHR/Top 40 (Billboard)	22
Canada Hot AC (Billboard)	10
Czech Republic Airplay (ČNS IFPI)	33
Czech Republic Singles Digital (ČNS IFPI)	9
Denmark (Tracklisten)	26
Euro Digital Songs (Billboard)	11
Germany (GfK)	31
Hungary (Rádiós Top 40)	10
Hungary (Single Top 40)	24
Hungary (Stream Top 40)	12
Ireland (IRMA)	5
Italy (FIMI)	17
Latvia (Latvijas Top 40)	2
Mexico (Billboard Ingles Airplay)	15
Netherlands (Single Top 100)	43
New Zealand (Recorded Music NZ)	5
Norway (VG-lista)	38
Poland Airplay (ZPAV)	20
Portugal (AFP)	18
Scottish Singles Sales (Official Charts)	7
Slovakia Airplay (ČNS IFPI)	21
Slovakia Singles Digital (ČNS IFPI)	11
Slovenia (SloTop50)	11
Sweden (Sverigetopplistan)	17
Switzerland (Schweizer Hitparade)	26
UK Singles (Official Charts)	12
US Billboard Hot 100	48
US Adult Contemporary (Billboard)	24
US Adult Pop Airplay (Billboard)	11
US Dance Club Songs (Billboard)	38
US Dance Airplay (Billboard)	13
US Pop Airplay (Billboard)	17

=== Year-end charts ===
Chart (2015)	Position
Australia (ARIA)	77
Hungary (Rádiós Top 40)	85
Hungary (Stream Top 40)	58
UK Singles (Official Charts Company)	93
Chart (2016)	Position
Hungary (Rádiós Top 40)	52
Hungary (Stream Top 40)	75
Italy (FIMI)	92

=== Certifications ===
Region	Certification	Certified units/sales
Australia (ARIA)	2× Platinum	140,000^{‡}
Canada (Music Canada)	2× Platinum	160,000^{‡}
Denmark (IFPI Danmark)	Platinum	90,000^{‡}
Germany (BVMI)	Gold	200,000^{‡}
Italy (FIMI)	2× Platinum	100,000^{‡}
New Zealand (RMNZ)	3× Platinum	90,000^{‡}
Poland (ZPAV)	Gold	25,000^{‡}
United Kingdom (BPI)	Platinum	600,000^{‡}
United States (RIAA)	Platinum	1,000,000^{‡}
^{‡} Sales+streaming figures based on certification alone.
