= Australia in the Eurovision Song Contest 2024 =

- Eurovision Song Contest 2024
- Participating broadcaster: Special Broadcasting Service (SBS)
- Country: Australia
- Selection process: Internal selection
- Announcement date: 5 March 2024

Competing entry
- Song: "One Milkali (One Blood)"
- Artist: Electric Fields
- Songwriters: Michael Ross; Zaachariaha Fielding

Placement
- Semi-final result: Failed to qualify (11th)

Participation chronology

Australia was represented at the Eurovision Song Contest 2024 with the song "One Milkali (One Blood)", written by Michael Ross and Zaachariaha Fielding, and performed by themselves as Electric Fields. The Australian participating broadcaster, the Special Broadcasting Service (SBS), internally selected its entry for the contest.

== Background ==
The Special Broadcasting Service (SBS) had broadcast the Eurovision Song Contest in Australia since 1983, and the contest had gained a cult following over that time, primarily due to the country's strong political and cultural ties with Europe. Paying tribute to this, the 2014 semi-finals included an interval act featuring Australian singer Jessica Mauboy. Australian singers had also participated at Eurovision representing other countries, including Olivia Newton-John (United Kingdom 1974), two-time winner Johnny Logan (Ireland 1980 and 1987), Gina G (United Kingdom 1996), and Jane Comerford as lead singer of Texas Lightning (Germany 2006).

The European Broadcasting Union (EBU) invited SBS to participate in the contest representing Australia for the first time in 2015, as a guest participant to celebrate the 60th edition of the event, being granted automatic entry into the final along with the "Big 5" (France, Germany, Italy, Spain, and the United Kingdom) and the host country (Austria). It had since competed in every edition of the contest, i.e. eight times, being required to qualify from its semi-final since 2016. In 2023, it entered the song "Promise" by Voyager; qualifying for the final, ending in ninth place with 151 points.

On 12 February 2019, SBS signed a contract securing a spot at the contest until 2023. On 21 September 2023, the broadcaster revealed that it was in talks with the EBU to secure its participation in future editions, later confirming that it would broadcast the 2024 contest. Australia ultimately appeared on the final list of participants of the 2024 contest on 5 December 2023.

== Before Eurovision ==
=== Internal selection ===
On 15 February 2024, SBS announced that it had internally selected the Australian entrant and entry for the contest and that they would be revealed on 6 March (corresponding to 5 March in other competing countries), with a snippet of the song published two days prior to its release. The entrants were announced to be Electric Fields with the song "One Milkali (One Blood)"; the duo had finished runner-up in the first edition of Eurovision – Australia Decides in 2019 with the song "2000 and Whatever". The song was the first Eurovision entry to feature words in the Yankunytjatjara language.

=== Promotion ===
As part of the promotion of their participation in the contest, Electric Fields attended the Copenhagen Eurovision Party (Malmöhagen) on 4 May 2024.

== At Eurovision ==
The Eurovision Song Contest 2024 took place at the Malmö Arena in Malmö, Sweden, and consisted of two semi-finals held on the respective dates of 7 and 9 May and the final on 11 May 2024. All nations with the exceptions of the host country and the "Big Five" (France, Germany, Italy, Spain and the United Kingdom) were required to qualify from one of two semi-finals in order to compete in the final; the top ten countries from each semi-final progress to the final. On 30 January 2024, an allocation draw was held to determine which of the two semi-finals, as well as which half of the show, each country would perform in; the EBU split up the competing countries into different pots based on voting patterns from previous contests, with countries with favourable voting histories put into the same pot. Australia was scheduled for the second half of the first semi-final. The shows' producers then decided the running order for the semi-finals; Australia was set to perform in position 13.

In Australia, all the shows are being aired on the SBS channel, as well as on the broadcaster's online platform SBS On Demand. Commentary is provided by Myf Warhurst and Joel Creasey, with Courtney Act joining as backstage correspondent.

=== Performance ===
Electric Fields took part in technical rehearsals on 28 April and 1 May, followed by dress rehearsals on 6 and 7 May. For their performance of "One Milkali (One Blood)" at the contest, they were accompanied on stage by backing singers Brendan Maclean, Alyson Joyce and Simi Vuata, didgeridoo player Fred Leone, and a dancer; LED lighting was heavily used, with the background art being a work by Electric Fields' singer Zaachariaha Fielding.

=== Semi-final ===
Australia performed in position 13, following the entry from Azerbaijan and before the entry from Portugal. The country was not announced among the top 10 entries in the semi-final and therefore failed to qualify to compete in the final. It was later revealed that Australia placed 11th with 41 points.

=== Voting ===
Below is a breakdown of points awarded by and to Australia in the first semi-final and in the final. Voting during the three shows involved each country awarding sets of points from 1-8, 10 and 12: one from their professional jury and the other from televoting in the final vote, while the semi-final vote was based entirely on the vote of the public. The Australian jury consisted of Jane Albert, Alfie Arcuri, Meagan Loader, Mia Rodriguez, and Mason Watts. In the first semi-final, Australia placed 11th with 41 points. Over the course of the contest, Australia awarded its 12 points to Croatia in the first semi-final, and to Ireland (jury) and Israel (televote) in the final.

SBS appointed Danny Estrin, who represented Australia in the 2023 contest as part of the group Voyager, as its spokesperson to announce the Australian jury's votes in the final.

==== Points received by Australia ====
Points awarded to Australia (Semi-final 1)
Score	Televote
12 points	
10 points	
8 points	
7 points	
6 points	
5 points	Finland; Ukraine; United Kingdom
4 points	Germany; Ireland; Sweden
3 points	Luxembourg
2 points	Iceland; Lithuania; Poland; Portugal; Rest of the World
1 point	Moldova

==== Points awarded by Australia ====
Points awarded by Australia (Semi-final 1)
Score	Televote
12 points	Croatia
10 points	Ireland
8 points	Ukraine
7 points	Cyprus
6 points	Lithuania
5 points	Finland
4 points	Luxembourg
3 points	Slovenia
2 points	Portugal
1 point	Poland

Points awarded by Australia (Final)
Score	Televote	Jury
12 points	Israel	Ireland
10 points	Croatia	Switzerland
8 points	Ireland	Croatia
7 points	Switzerland	Italy
6 points	Ukraine	Cyprus
5 points	Cyprus	Sweden
4 points	Finland	United Kingdom
3 points	Greece	Finland
2 points	France	Luxembourg
1 point	Armenia	Ukraine

==== Detailed voting results ====
Each participating broadcaster assembles a five-member jury panel consisting of music industry professionals who are citizens of the country they represent. Each jury, and individual jury member, is required to meet a strict set of criteria regarding professional background, as well as diversity in gender and age. No member of a national jury was permitted to be related in any way to any of the competing acts in such a way that they cannot vote impartially and independently. The individual rankings of each jury member as well as the nation's televoting results were released shortly after the grand final.

The following members comprised the Australian jury:

- Jane Albert
- Alfie Arcuri
- Meagan Loader
- Mia Rodriguez
- Mason Watts

Detailed voting results from Australia (Semi-final 1)
R/O	Country	Televote	
R/O	Country	Rank	Points
01	Cyprus	4	7
02	Serbia	11	
03	Lithuania	5	6
04	Ireland	2	10
05	Ukraine	3	8
06	Poland	10	1
07	Croatia	1	12
08	Iceland	12	
09	Slovenia	8	3
10	Finland	6	5
11	Moldova	13	
12	Azerbaijan	14	
13	Australia		
14	Portugal	9	2
15	Luxembourg	7	4

Detailed voting results from Australia (Final)
R/O	Country	Jury							Televote	
R/O	Country	Juror A	Juror B	Juror C	Juror D	Juror E	Rank	Points	Rank	Points
01	Sweden	18	4	8	8	6	6	5	20	
02	Ukraine	16	9	17	4	9	10	1	5	6
03	Germany	11	6	25	6	18	13		19	
04	Luxembourg	15	5	4	15	19	9	2	16	
~~05~~	~~Netherlands~~ ‡ (Note: The Netherlands was disqualified prior to the final.)	~~26~~	~~26~~	~~1~~	~~24~~	~~20~~	~~11~~		N/A	
06	Israel	20	8	24	11	26	20		1	12
07	Lithuania	19	10	16	19	22	22		12	
08	Spain	22	13	19	22	21	24		11	
09	Estonia	23	25	18	26	8	21		13	
10	Ireland	1	3	2	2	1	1	12	3	8
11	Latvia	21	24	23	23	12	25		21	
12	Greece	10	12	6	25	23	16		8	3
13	United Kingdom	13	7	5	9	7	7	4	17	
14	Norway	7	23	26	21	10	17		18	
15	Italy	6	2	7	20	11	4	7	14	
16	Serbia	9	16	15	12	25	19		22	
17	Finland	24	14	14	5	4	8	3	7	4
18	Portugal	5	19	13	10	14	15		23	
19	Armenia	14	21	9	14	5	14		10	1
20	Cyprus	4	15	10	3	13	5	6	6	5
21	Switzerland	8	1	12	1	3	2	10	4	7
22	Slovenia	17	18	20	17	17	23		25	
23	Croatia	3	17	3	7	2	3	8	2	10
24	Georgia	2	22	21	16	16	12		24	
25	France	25	20	22	13	24	26		9	2
26	Austria	12	11	11	18	15	18		15	
