= Live in Concert (Electric Fields album) =

Live album by Electric Fields with Melbourne Symphony Orchestra
- Released: 6 December 2024
- Recorded: 8 July 2023
- Venue: Hamer Hall, Melbourne
- Label: ABC Music

Electric Fields albums chronology
Inma (2016)	Live in Concert (2024)

Singles from Live in Concert
- 1. "Shade Away" Released: 25 October 2024; 2. "Don't You Worry" Released: 6 December 2024

Live in Concert is a live album by Australian duo Electric Fields and Melbourne Symphony Orchestra. The album was announced in October 2024 alongside its lead single. Upon announcement, the duo said, "Performing with the Melbourne Symphony Orchestra was genuine bliss. Hearing out electronic music woven through those organic elements was like floating. We can't wait for you to feel that." The album was released on 6 December 2024.

At the AIR Awards of 2025, the album won Best Independent Classical Album or EP.

At the 2025 ARIA Music Awards, the album was nominated for ARIA Award for Best World Music Album.

== Background and release ==
On 7 July 2022, Electric Fields performed a "one night only" at Hamer Hall, Melbourne as part of NAIDOC Week. In a 4/5 star review, Raphael Solarsh from Arts Hub said "A full orchestra brings something special to any performance and their partnership with Electric Fields was filled with depth, feeling and panache. Aaron Wyatt and Alex Turley did a brilliant job of translating electro pop songs into full compositions and the orchestra, like the audience couldn’t help but be swept up in the energy of the moment."

On 8 July 2023, the duo returned for an encore performance. Michael Ross from Electric Fields said "We are so honoured to perform again with the MSO, sharing our music with the deep textures of the orchestra. The performance will include our pop compositions, along with traditional songs drawing through the root systems of Zaachariaha's community, creating a sonic landscape from the desert sands." In a 4.5/5 star review, Guy Webster from Limelight said "Their sound is at once epic and intimate; each song the perfect combination of anthemic choruses and hard-hitting bridges supported by Fielding's soaring vocals and Ross's tight production."

On 19 October 2024, the performance was repeated, but with the Sydney Symphony Orchestra.

The album was announced in October 2024, alongside lead single. The duo said "'Shade Away' is the first offering from our full live album with the Melbourne Symphony Orchestra. This song looks at disappearing bitter gloom by flooding your energy with the glow of kindness."

"Don't You Worry" was released alongside the album's release. The duo said "We will never forget performing 'Don't You Worry' with the MSO. This is the moment the audience stood up and spontaneously began dancing to a symphony orchestra. Pure sunshine."

== Reception ==
Greg Phillips from Australian Musician said "This isn't just an album — it's a masterful blend of sonic innovation and orchestral grandeur, a once-in-a-lifetime musical experience. Recorded live, this 13-track masterpiece transports listeners to the heart of a magical evening, where Electric Fields' iconic sound met the symphonic might of one of the world's finest orchestras. From soaring vocals to pulsating beats, each track is a reimagined celebration of the duo’s greatest hits, amplified by the power of the MSO."

== Track listing ==
1. "Prelude" - 1:37
2. "Anpuru Maau Kutjpa" - 4:00
3. "Shade Away" - 6:07
4. "Lore Woman" - 6:40
5. "Glorious" - 4:33
6. "Dali" - 5:33
7. "From Little Things, Big Things Grow" - 6:46
8. "Tjitji Lullaby" - 2:08
9. "Pukulpa" - 5:39
10. "2000 and Whatever" 4:43
11. "Catastrophe" - 3:54
12. "Antara Maau Kutjpa" - 3:19
13. "Don't You Worry" - 4:07
- Note: tracks 1, 7 & 10 are excluded from the vinyl release.
