= Electric Fields =

Electric-soul duo from Adelaide, South Australia

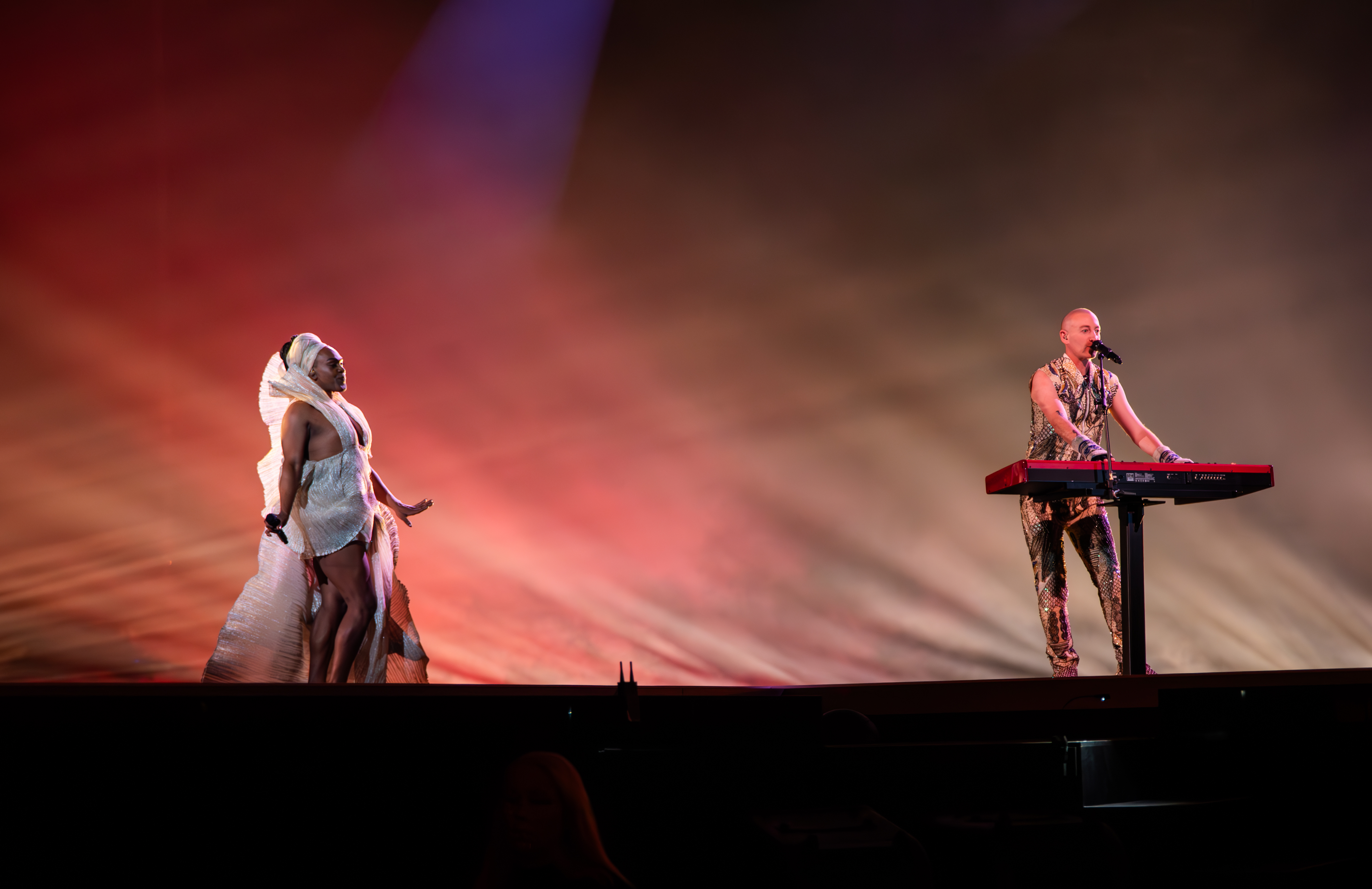
- Electric Fields performing in 2024

Background information
- Origin: Adelaide, South Australia, Australia
- Genres: Electronic, pop, soul
- Years active: 2015–present
- Label: Warner Music Australia
- Members: Zaachariaha Fielding; Michael Ross
- Website: electricfieldsmusic.com.au

Electric Fields are an Australian electronic music duo made up of vocalist Zaachariaha Fielding and keyboard player and producer Michael Ross. Electric Fields combine modern electric-soul music with Aboriginal culture and sing in Pitjantjatjara, Yankunytjatjara and English. The duo have released an EP and several singles. In 2024, they became the first duo to represent Australia in the Eurovision Song Contest, with the song "One Milkali (One Blood)".

== Career ==
=== 2011–2020: Formation and Inma ===
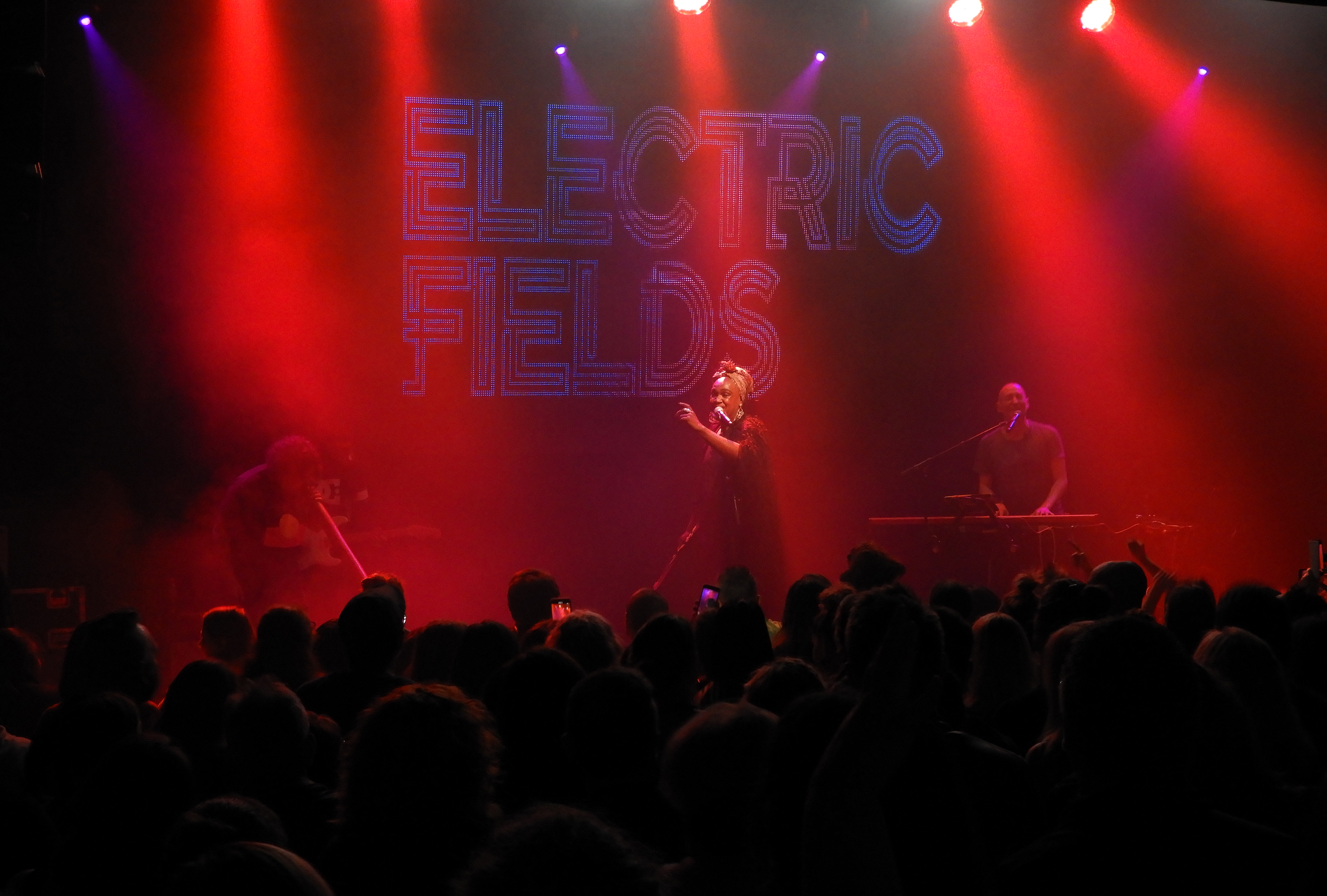
At the Lion Arts Factory in Adelaide during the "2000 and Whatever" tour, July 2019

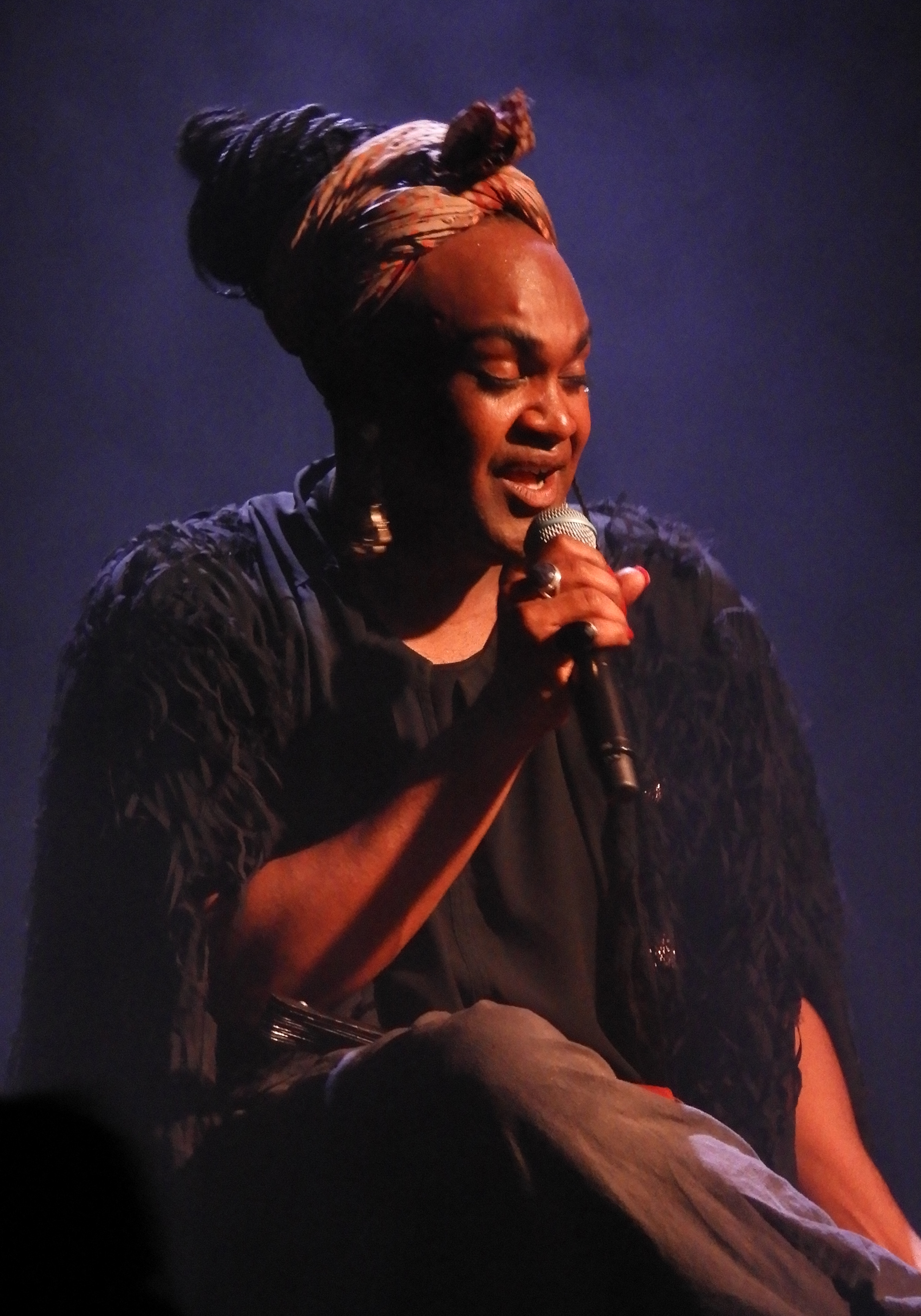
Fielding performing "Nina" at an Electric Fields concert in Adelaide

In 2011, Zaachariaha Fielding auditioned for the third season of The X Factor Australia, performing Tracy Chapman's "Talkin Bout a Revolution". In 2013, Michael Ross auditioned for the fifth season performing Phil Collins' "You Can't Hurry Love".

The pair has been performing as Electric Fields since 2015. Their repertoire moves across pop, soul and electronica, while being described as "Daft Punk meets Nina Simone in the Deep Forest".

In June 2016, the duo released their debut EP Inma (which derives its name from the cultural ceremony of Aṉangu women known as inma). Daniel Browning, a presenter and producer of ABC Radio National said "Co-creating music that is as exciting as it is emotionally moving – the beauty and sheer power of their musicality is breathtaking. Often featuring Zaachariaha's traditional languages of the Anangu Pitjantjatjara Yankunytjatjara people, Electric Fields music ranges from pop to epic-scale electronic works, through to intensely intimate story-songs." Their music was played at the Spirit Festival 2016 and Adelaide Fashion Festival 2016 and on Triple J. In 2016, the duo won the Emily Burrows Award, an award given to recognise and further the professional development of original South Australian music artists or bands.

The duo won Best New Talent of the Year at the 2017 National Indigenous Music Awards. The duo was nominated for Artist of the Year at the 2018 National Indigenous Music Awards.

In December 2018, the duo was announced as one of the entrants in Eurovision – Australia Decides in an attempt to represent Australia in the Eurovision Song Contest 2019. Electric Fields performed at the competition with their song "2000 and Whatever" on 9 February 2019 and came second in both Jury and Audience vote, and second overall. In May 2019, the duo announced the Australian jury votes at the Eurovision Song Contest final. Later that year, Electric Fields toured with "2000 and Whatever" around Australia.

In July 2019, Electric Fields received two nominations at the National Indigenous Music Awards.

On 3 April 2020, Electric Fields' collaboration with Norwegian group Keiino "Would I Lie" was released.

The duo were joined virtually by Jessica Mauboy, Missy Higgins and John Butler for a performance of Paul Kelly and Kev Carmody‘s song about the Gurindji strike, "From Little Things Big Things Grow". The performance was recorded at the Adelaide Botanic Garden conservatory, and broadcast for the season finale of ABC Television's 6-part pandemic series, The Sound, on 23 August 2020.

In August 2020, they performed three acoustic sets at the Ukaria Cultural Centre in Mount Barker in the Adelaide Hills, in a collaboration with online streaming platform Sunny Side Uploads.

In October 2020, the duo performed "From Little Things Big Things Grow" at the 2020 AFL Grand Final.

In December 2020, Electric Fields headlined one of the shows in the queer talent-seeking series "Express Yourself – Queer Discovery", which was run by APRA AMCOS and Sydney Gay and Lesbian Mardi Gras.

=== 2021–present ===
In February 2021, Electric Fields performed "Don't You Worry" and "Gold Energy" at the Sydney Cricket Ground for Mardi Gras.

In November 2021, Electric Fields performed "From Little Things, Big Things Grow" at the National Indigenous Music Awards. In the same month, they signed a global deal with Warner Music Australia and released "Gold Energy". On 18 March 2022, the duo released "Catastrophe".

In February 2023, Electric Fields released "We the People" as the official WorldPride theme song. They performed their song to a crowd of 20,000 people at the festival's opening concert in Sydney's Domain on 24 February 2023, saying "Pride is not just about acceptance, but feeling at home in your own individuality".

In July 2023, the duo performed with the Melbourne Symphony Orchestra for a second time. The live album was released December 2024.

On 5 March 2024, the duo was announced as the Australian representatives for the Eurovision Song Contest 2024, taking place in Malmö in May, with the song "One Milkali (One Blood)". The song includes Yankunytjatjara lyrics. The duo failed to progress from the first semi-final on 7 May 2024, placing 11th out of 15 with 41 points.

On 17 March 2024, Electric Fields performed in a concert called "Floods of Fire" with the Adelaide Symphony Orchestra at the Adelaide Festival Centre, as the finale to the Adelaide Festival.

== Members ==
=== Identity ===
Electric Fields' band motto is "bypass the barriers", and Fielding and Ross describe themselves as "two feminine brothers", embracing their queer identity and affectionately referring to each other as Mala (Fielding, the "younger sibling") and Tjutja (Ross, the "older brother"). They are very close friends but not romantically involved. They embrace their feminine identity, saying that it makes them stronger. They are 10 years and one day apart in age.

=== Zaachariaha Fielding ===
Zaachariaha Fielding is the oldest of nine children of a family who live in Mimili, in the APY lands of north-west South Australia. He studied Indigenous Australian music and started producing his own work at the Centre for Aboriginal Studies in Music at the University of Adelaide.

He is also known as an artist, whose work has been exhibited in several exhibitions as well as winning the Wynne Prize and the Ramsay Art Prize A$15,000 People's Choice prize in 2023.

=== Michael Ross ===
Michael Ross is a singer, songwriter, pianist and producer from Adelaide. His musical influences growing up were mainly Mariah Carey, along with the Cranberries, Tracy Chapman, and Lauryn Hill.

Before joining Electric Fields, Ross was a contestant on The X Factor Australia in 2013.

== In film ==
Electric Fields are the subject of a SBS/NITV documentary, "Voice From The Desert", screened nationally from 10 December 2018. The film was part of the Our Stories series, featuring emerging Indigenous Australian creatives, and directed by Daniel Clarke and Amy Pysden. The doco shows the duo performing at the 2017 National Indigenous Music Awards in Darwin, as well as covering Fielding visiting Mimili, and examining his early life experiences growing up in remote South Australia and his artistic and personal growth. There are also interviews with his parents Kaye Lowah and Robert Fielding.

== Discography ==
=== Albums ===
Title	Details
Live in Concert (with Melbourne Symphony Orchestra)	Released: 6 December 2024; Label: Electric Fields, MSO, ABC Music; Formats: LP, digital download, streaming

=== Extended plays ===
Title	Details
Inma	Released: 20 June 2016; Label: Electric Fields; Formats: Digital download, streaming

=== Singles ===
==== As lead artist ====
Title	Year	Peak chart positions	Album
Title	Year	AUS Digital	Album
"2000 and Whatever"	2019	38	Non-album single
"Vision"	2019	—	Deadly Hearts 2
"Gold Energy"	2021	—	Non-album singles
"Catastrophe"	2022	—	Non-album singles
"We the People"	2023	—	Non-album singles
"Anpuru Maau Kutjpa"	2023	—	Faraway Downs (Soundtrack)
"One Milkali (One Blood)"	2024	—	Non-album singles
"Shade Away" (with Melbourne Symphony Orchestra)	2024	—	Live in Concert
"Don't You Worry" (with Melbourne Symphony Orchestra)	2024	—	Live in Concert
"—" denotes a recording that did not chart or was not released in that territory.

==== As featured artist ====
Title	Year	Album
"No Other High" (Touch Sensitive featuring Electric Fields)	2017	Visions
"Would I Lie" (Keiino featuring Electric Fields)	2020	Okta
"Must Be Love" (Tseba featuring Electric Fields)	2021	Non-album single
"Fight for Me" (Barkaa featuring Electric Fields)	2022	TBA
"See Your Face" (Tseba featuring Electric Fields)	2023	TBA
"Red Future" (Snotty Nose Rez Kids featuring Electric Fields)	2024	Red Future
"Sound of Silence" (re-recorded) (Dami Im featuring Electric Fields)	2026	TBA

=== Other appearances ===
List of other non-single song appearances
Title	Year	Album
"Shade Away"	2017	NIMA Presents: The Sound of Indigenous Australia - Now and Before
"Glorious" (Hermitude featuring Electric Fields)	2019	Pollyanarchy
"From Little Things Big Things Grow"	2020	Cannot Buy My Soul: The Songs of Kev Carmody
"Tjitji Lullaby"	2022	ABC Kids
"Tjarpala"	2023	Faraway Downs (Soundtrack)
"Antara Maau Kutjpa"	2023	Faraway Downs (Soundtrack)
"Tjukurpa Spirit"	2023	Faraway Downs (Soundtrack)
"Tjukurpa"	2023	Faraway Downs (Soundtrack)
"Ngula"	2023	Faraway Downs (Soundtrack)
"Dream On" (with the Prison Choir)	2024	How to Make Gravy

== Awards ==
Electric Fields were awarded a Robert Stigwood Fellowship, which provided mentorship and professional development, by the Music Development Office in SA.

=== AACTA Awards ===
The Australian Academy of Cinema and Television Arts Awards is an awards ceremony to celebrate the best of Australian films and television.

Year	Nominee / work	Award	Result	Ref.
2025	"Dream On" (Megan Washington) by Electric Fields & The Prison Choir	Best Original Song	Nominated	

=== AIR Awards ===
The Australian Independent Record Awards (commonly known informally as AIR Awards) is an annual awards night to recognise, promote and celebrate the success of Australia's Independent Music sector.

Year	Nominee / work	Award	Result	Ref.
2025	Live in Concert (with Melbourne Symphony Orchestra )	Best Independent Classical Album or EP	Nominated	

=== ARIA Music Awards ===
The ARIA Music Awards is an annual award ceremony event celebrating the Australian music industry. Electric Fields have been nominated for two awards.

Year	Nominee / work	Award	Result	Ref.
2019	2000 and Whatever Tour	Best Australian Live Act	Nominated	
2024	Faraway Downs (with various artists)	Best Original Soundtrack, Cast or Show Album	Won	
2025	Live in Concert (with Melbourne Symphony Orchestra)	Best World Music Album	Nominated	

=== National Dreamtime Awards ===
The National Dreamtime Awards is an annual celebration of Australian Aboriginal and Torres Strait Islander achievement in sport, arts, academic and community and commenced in 2017. Electric Fields have won one award.

Year	Nominee / work	Award	Result
2019	Themselves	Male Music Artist	Won

=== National Indigenous Music Awards ===
The National Indigenous Music Awards is an annual awards ceremony that recognises the achievements of Indigenous Australians in music. The award ceremony commenced in 2004. Electric Fields have won one award from four nominations.

Year	Nominee / work	Award	Result	Ref.
2017	Themselves	Best New Talent	Won	
2018	Themselves	Artist of the Year	Nominated	
2019	Themselves	Artist of the Year	Nominated	
2019	"2000 and Whatever"	Song of the Year	Nominated	
2020	Themselves	Artist of the Year	Nominated	
2020	Electric Fields and Keiino - "Would I Lie"	Song of the Year	Nominated	
2022	Themselves	Artist of the Year	Nominated	
2024	Themselves	Artist of the Year	Nominated	
2024	"One Milkali (One Blood)"	Song of the Year	Nominated	
2024	"Anpuru Maau Kutjpa"	Indigenous Language Award	Won	

=== National Live Music Awards ===
The National Live Music Awards (NLMAs) commenced in 2016 to recognise contributions to the live music industry in Australia. They paused between 2021 and 2022 due to COVID-19

Year	Nominee / work	Award	Result	Ref.
2017	Themselves	South Australian Live Act of the Year	Won	
2017	Zaachariaha Fielding (Electric Fields)	South Australian Live Voice of the Year	Won	
2018	Themselves	Live Electronic Act (or DJ) of the Year	Won	
2019	Themselves	Live Act of the Year	Won	
2019	Themselves	Live Electronic Act (or DJ) of the Year	Won	
2019	Zaachariaha Fielding (Electric Fields)	Live Voice of the Year	Won	
2020	Zaachariaha Fielding (Electric Fields)	Live Voice of the Year	Won	
2023	Themselves	Best Live Act	Nominated	
2023	Themselves	Best Live Act in SA	Nominated	
2023	Themselves	Best Pop Act	Nominated	
2023	Zaachariaha Fielding	Live Voice in SA	Nominated	
2023	Zaachariaha Fielding (Electric Fields)	Best Live Voice	Won	

=== Screen Music Awards ===
Year	Nominee / work	Award	Result	Ref.
2025	"Dream On" (Megan Washington) (by Electric Fields & The Prison Choir)	Best Original Song Composed for the Screen	Won	

=== South Australian Music Awards ===
The South Australian Music Awards (previously known as the Fowler's Live Music Awards) are annual awards that exist to recognise, promote and celebrate excellence in the South Australian contemporary music industry. They commenced in 2012.|

Year	Nominee / work	Award	Result (wins only)
2019	Themselves	Best Aboriginal or Torres Strait Island Artist	Won
2019	Themselves	People's Choice Electronic Award	Won
2024	Themselves	Best Aboriginal or Torres Strait Island Artist	Won

Preceded by Voyager with "Promise"	Australia in the Eurovision Song Contest; 2024	Succeeded by Go-Jo with "Milkshake Man"
