= Voyager (Australian band) =

Australian progressive metal band

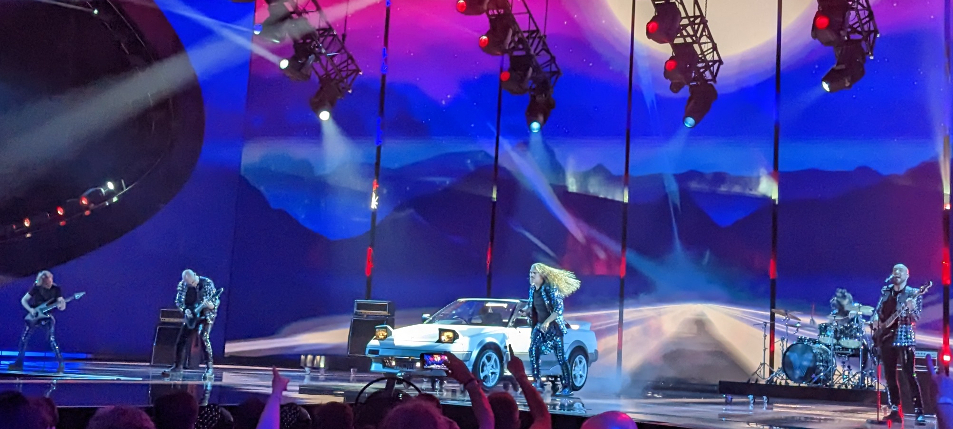
- Voyager at the second semi-final of Eurovision 2023

Background information
- Origin: Perth, Western Australia
- Genres: Progressive metal; progressive rock
- Years active: 1999−present
- Labels: V; Dockyard 1; Locomotive; Riot!; Iav; Season of Mist
- Members: Daniel "Danny" Estrin; Simone Dow; Alex Canion; Scott Kay; Ashley Doodkorte
- Past members: Mark Baker; Adam Lovkis; Geoff Callaghan; Emanuel Rudnicki; Mark De Vattimo; Jennah Greaig; Melissa Fiocco; Mark Boeijen; Chris Hanssen
- Website: voyagerau.com

Voyager are an Australian progressive metal band from Perth, Western Australia, formed in 1999. They have released eight studio albums. Their latest, Fearless in Love, was released in 2023. The band represented Australia in the Eurovision Song Contest 2023 with the song "Promise", finishing in ninth place.

== History ==
=== 1999–2003: Formation and Element V ===
Voyager formed in 1999 at the University of Western Australia by Daniel Estrin, Mark Baker, and Adam Lovkis. The band saw a few line-up changes before recording the album Element V in 2003 with Aidan Barton at Sovereign Studios, Willetton, Western Australia. The line-up for Element V consisted of Daniel Estrin (keyboards, vocals), Mark De Vattimo (guitar), Jennah Graieg (bass), Geoff Callaghan (drums) and Emanuel Rudnicki (guitar), in 2002.

The album Element V was released in Australia in 2003, and then picked up by Dutch label DVS Records and released in Europe the following year. Japanese label Woodbell/Experience licensed the album for Japanese distribution in the same year and released it with a bonus track, "Now and Forever".

Voyager's popularity increased rapidly following the European release of Element V and the band secured its first major support, opening for Steve Vai in Perth in July 2004.

After the release of Element V, Melissa Fiocco replaced Jennah on bass. Voyager performed at Melbourne's Corner Hotel in late 2005 as part of a Screaming Symphony radio benefit concert, playing for the first time out of their home state of Western Australia. Towards the end of 2005, Emanuel and Geoff departed the band and were replaced by Simone Dow and Mark Boeijen respectively, just prior to the recording of the follow-up album, uniVers.

=== 2006–2007: uniVers and ProgPower Europe ===
In early 2006, Voyager entered Sovereign studios to record "uniVers", with Boeijen and Dow as firm members of the band. Voyager shot a video clip to the radio edit version of the song "Sober" and released this as a limited edition single in 2006.

The band performed at the ProgPower Europe Festival in the Netherlands in 2006 and received positive responses from the media. As a result of this performance, Voyager were invited to ProgPower UK in 2008. In late 2006, Voyager were due to perform with Nevermore, whose Perth leg of the show was ultimately cancelled. Voyager were also due to support Yngwie Malmsteen following their return from the first European Tour, but were struck from the show at the last minute because Malmsteen did not want any support acts for his Australian tour.

In early 2007, DVS Records announced its closure and Voyager had no label to release their album uniVers, which was fully recorded at that stage.

In October 2007, the band signed to German label Dockyard 1 Records in Hamburg, who released uniVers worldwide, with the USA receiving the album for distribution in January 2008 through Locomotive Records. uniVers received critical acclaim throughout the world, being voted album of the month by Belgium's Mindview magazine and album of the week in Finland's Imperiumi magazine. It was named as #7 of the Full Metal Racket albums of 2007 by Australia's national alternative broadcasting station Triple J. The band was nominated in the Top 10 of the MusicOz Awards.

The band parted ways with bass player Melissa Fiocco shortly after the release of uniVers, a split which was not without controversy. Fiocco was replaced by Alex Canion, who was 18 years old. Shortly after Canion's first appearance with Voyager in Perth, Western Australia, the band embarked on a mini-tour to Sydney and Melbourne with labelmates Eyefear, to promote uniVers.

In January 2008, Voyager performed with Nightwish in Perth. The band's scheduled Australian tour with Toto in March 2008 was cancelled, apparently due to Toto's stage requirements. In late February 2008, ProgPower UK was also cancelled due to poor ticket sales.

Voyager indicated that they would continue their European tour of Denmark, Netherlands, Germany and Switzerland in spite of the cancellation. Their tour included a performance with 1980s arena rock band House of Lords at the Ballroom Hamburg.

In June 2008, guitarist Mark De Vattimo quit Voyager due to personal and professional differences.

Voyager performed together with Queensrÿche in August 2009 and with Deathstars from Sweden in September 2009.

=== 2009–2011: I Am the Revolution ===
After recording new songs with Adam Round at Kingdom Studios in Maylands, Western Australia and having the tracks mastered by Sterling Sound in New York City, Voyager released their album I Am the ReVolution on 20 September 2009 through Dockyard 1 Records in Germany and Riot Entertainment in Australia. The album was immediately received with critical acclaim, including the popular Vampster website, although some critics were sceptical about the band's strong melodic influences and their "pop" sound.

The album was named album of the week by Romania's MetalFan website and the song "Total Existence Failure" picked up the Song of the Year from the West Australian Music Industry Awards.

Voyager released a new video for the song "The Devil in Me" in October 2009.

In 2010, Voyager was nominated three times as a top 10 finalist at the Australian MusicOz Awards for "Lost", "The Devil in Me" and the video for the latter. The band also picked up a nomination for 2010 WAMI "Best hard rock/metal act" presented by the West Australian Music Industry.

Chris Hanssen and Voyager parted ways in 2010, with Scott Kay taking over guitar duties. Kay's first tour was with Scottish pirate metal band Alestorm in May 2011, during which the band received critical acclaim.

=== 2011–2013: The Meaning of I ===
After recording new songs in April/May 2011, Voyager signed a deal with New Jersey–based label Sensory. In October 2011 the band released The Meaning of I. The album is the first to feature new guitarist Scott Kay and the last to feature Mark Boeijen on drums who left shortly after the recording to focus on his family. The album features guest vocal performances by DC Cooper (Royal Hunt) and Daniel Tompkins (Tesseract, ex-Skyharbor). It was released worldwide on 11 October 2011, but was released early in the US at the ProgPower festival in September 2011.

Voyager were also announced for a show with Creation's End in Brooklyn on 11 September 2011. After returning from the US, Voyager toured with popular Finnish metal band Children of Bodom.

Voyager was one of the opening bands for Epica when they played in Perth on 23 April 2013.

=== 2013–2017: V ===
At the end of 2013, Voyager unveiled a crowdfunding campaign for their album V and unveiled clips of pre-production recordings of new songs. The campaign's goal was reached within three days of its launch. "Breaking Down" was the first single from the album.

In May 2015, Voyager toured nationally, supported by French progressive rock band Klone. They returned to North America in September for the US ProgPower event and a national tour.

=== 2017–2019: Ghost Mile ===
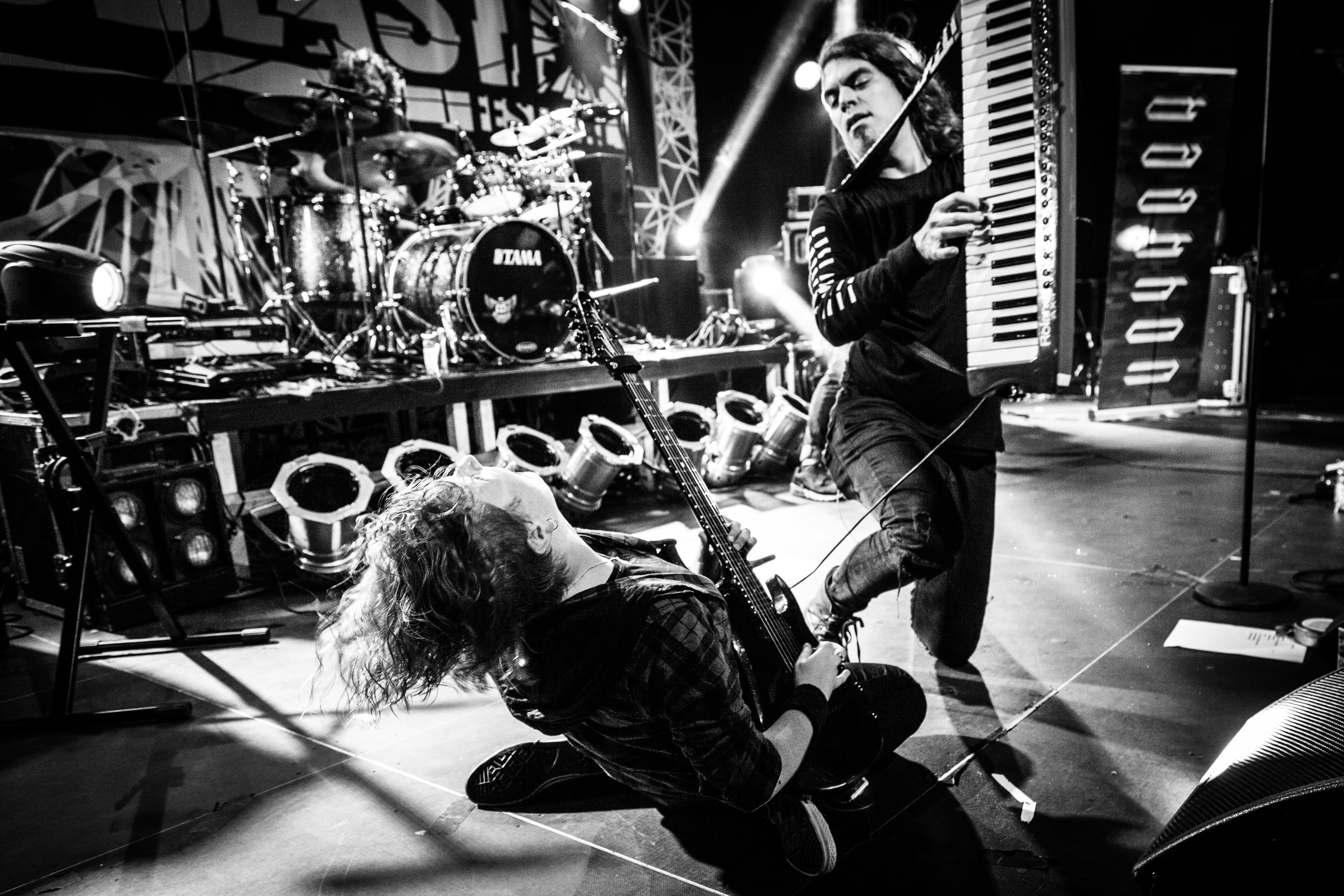
Voyager in 2017

Ghost Mile was released on 12 May 2017.

Voyager kicked off proceedings in the Prog Tent at Ramblin' Man Fair 2018, held at Mote Park in Maidstone, UK on 1st July 2018.

=== 2019–2020: Colours in the Sun ===
On 21 September 2018, Voyager performed at the o2 Indigo, London, UK as part of the European Space Agency's Space Rocks exhibition/concert, giving them the chance to play "Colours" and "Brightstar" from the forthcoming album. They also performed at the 229 the following evening as part of a short seven date European tour.

Voyager were shortlisted to the Australian national final for the Eurovision Song Contest 2020 with "Runaway", but were ultimately not chosen as one of the ten acts to compete in the final of the selection.

=== 2022–2023: Eurovision Song Contest and Fearless in Love ===
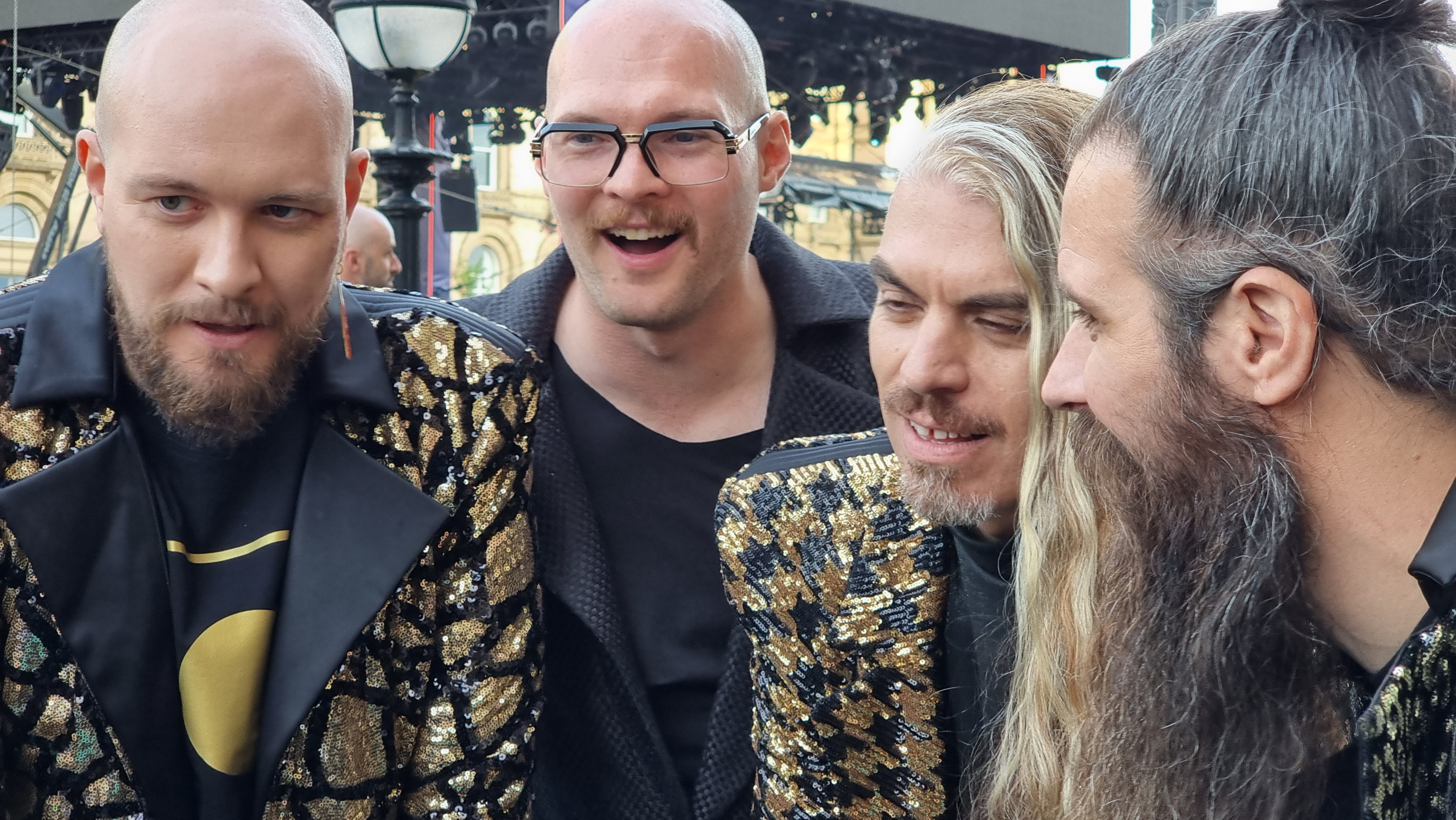
Voyager at the Eurovision Turquoise Carpet in 2023

The band were selected to take part in the Australian national selection for the Eurovision Song Contest 2022, Eurovision - Australia Decides, in 2022. They placed second with "Dreamer". Following its performance on Eurovision - Australia Decides, "Dreamer" debuted at number 6 on the Australian Independent Label Singles chart.

On 21 February 2023, it was announced that Voyager were internally selected to represent Australia in the Eurovision Song Contest 2023 with the song "Promise". While Australia has competed in Eurovision since 2015, all contestants from the country had up until 2023 been solo artists. Voyager therefore became the first band, as well as the first act from Western Australia, to represent Australia in the Eurovision Song Contest. "Promise" debuted at number 3 on the Australian Independent Label Singles chart.

Ahead of the Eurovision Song Contest, Voyager performed in Eurovision pre-parties in Madrid, Amsterdam and London. While in London, on April 20, 2023 Voyager performed to a sold-out show at the Boston Music Room to rave reviews.

Voyager won the second semi-final on 11 May 2023, a result determined solely by televotes. On 13 May 2023, Voyager was the fifteenth act to perform in the Grand Final and finished the competition in ninth place with 151 overall points, being the fifth Australian act to finish within the top 10.

In a press release from the Eurovision Song Contest published 5 June 2023, the band has arranged and composed their mix of "Te Deum" for the European Broadcasting Union (EBU) for use in the YouTube Premiere countdowns of the Eurovision Song Contest channel.

Following their return to Australia, Voyager were announced to perform as a major act in a free outdoor public concert to celebrate Western Australia Day. This announcement was greeted enthusiastically by local media but with significant criticism as to why Voyager were not headlining the concert. Ironically, inclement weather on the day resulted in Voyager playing to the largest crowd of the day, with excellent reviews.

June 2023 saw Voyager embark on a headlining national tour, playing in Brisbane, Melbourne, Adelaide, Perth, Sydney and Canberra. The entire tour was sold-out, with the Perth performance needing to move to a larger venue to accommodate demand. Each performance was met with enthusiastic and positive reviews as the band built on the momentum and publicity generated by their Eurovision performance.

Voyager's eighth album, Fearless in Love, was released on 14 July 2023. An early review called it a continued positive evolution of the band's unique musical style. It was the first Voyager album to chart, with an official ARIA album chart position of 35. It also achieved a position of three in the ARIA Australian artist chart and seven in the vinyl albums chart. In the Australian iTunes charts it went to number two in the overall album chart and number one in the rock albums chart.

On 21 September 2023, the band announced the cancellation of their headline European tour, which was scheduled to begin in October, due to lead singer Daniel Estrin having been diagnosed with cancer.

=== 2025: Seen Better Days ===
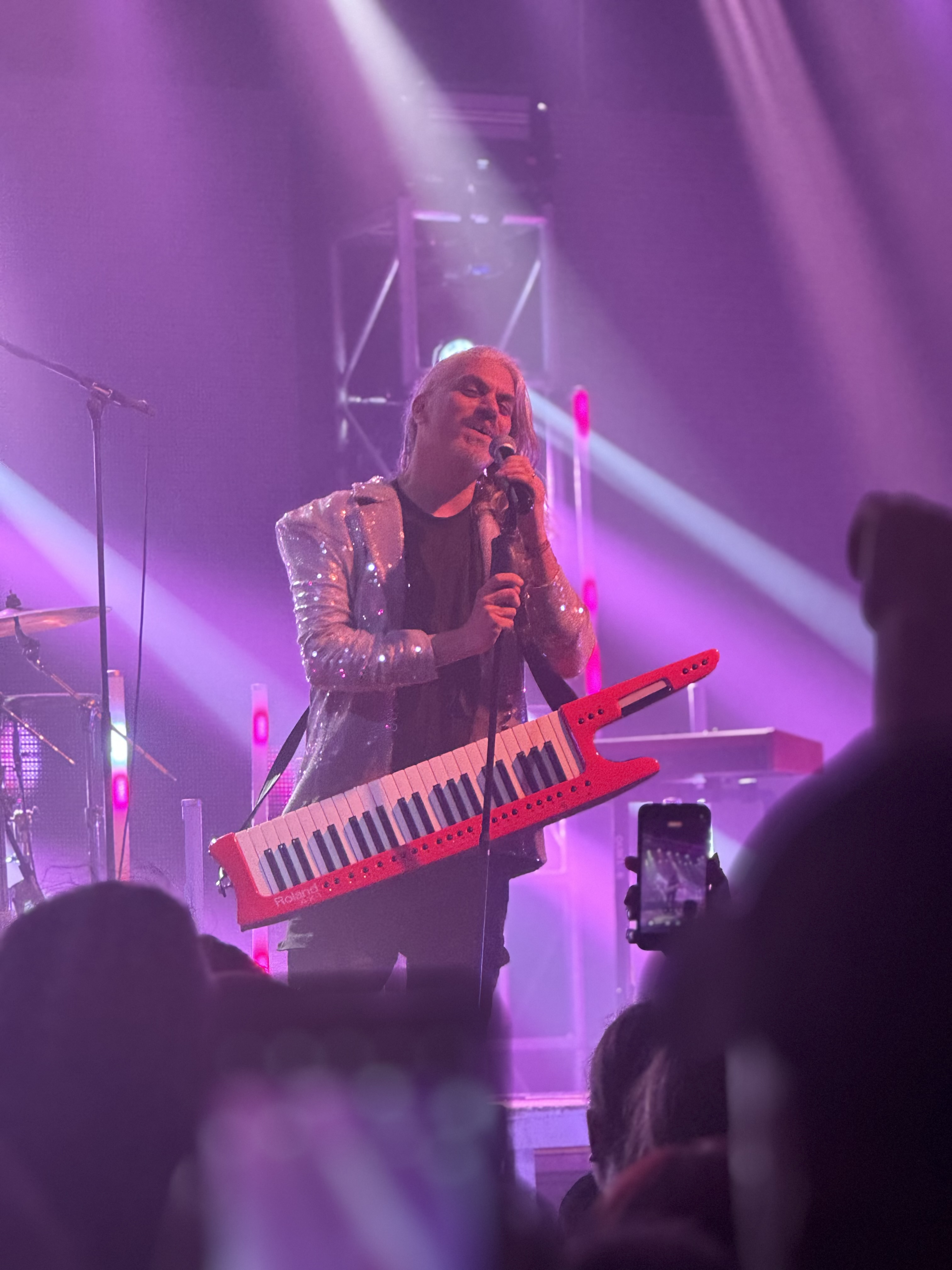
Estrin during Voyager's headline set at Euroblast Festival 2025

After an 18-month hiatus enforced by the needs of Estrin's medical treatment, the band released a new single "Seen Better Days" in April 2025, and performed internationally again for the first time in September – headlining the Euroblast Festival in Cologne, Germany.

== Musical style ==
Voyager plays progressive metal. Their sound has drawn comparisons with Anubis Gate, Dream Theater, Symphony X and Nevermore. With the album V, the band's style changed to progressive metal with pop, heavy metal and rock influences as well as djent chords.

== Band members ==
Current members

- Daniel "Danny" Estrin – lead vocals (1999–present), keyboards, keytar (2000–present), guitar (1999–2000)
- Simone Dow – guitar (2005–present)
- Alex Canion – bass (2007–present), backing vocals (2008–present)
- Scott Kay – guitar (2010–present)
- Ashley Doodkorte – drums (2011–present)

Former members

- Mark Baker – keyboards, keytar (1999–2000)
- Adam Lovkis – drums (1999–2000)
- Geoff Callaghan – drums (2000–2005)
- Emanuel Rudnicki – guitar (2000–2005)
- Mark De Vattimo – guitar, backing vocals (2000–2008)
- Jennah Greaig – bass (2001–2004)
- Melissa Fiocco – bass (2004–2007)
- Mark Boeijen – drums (2005–2011)
- Chris Hanssen – guitar (2009–2010)

Timeline

== Discography ==
=== Studio albums ===
List of studio albums, with selected details
Title	Album details	Peak chart positions
Title	Album details	AUS
Element V	Released: 4 April 2003; Label: V Music (VM 1X6V)	—
UniVers	Released: 10 January 2007; Label: Dockyard1 (DY100572)	—
I Am the Revolution	Released: 25 September 2009; Label: Riot! Entertainment (RIOT050CD)	—
The Meaning of I	Released: 22 June 2011; Label: Riot! Entertainment (RIOTCD081)	—
V	Released: 2 June 2014; Label: Iav (IAV1401)	—
Ghost Mile	Released: 12 May 2017; Label: Iav (IAV1701)	—
Colours in the Sun	Released: 1 November 2019; Label: Season of Mist (SOM 533)	—
Fearless in Love	Released: 14 July 2023; Label: Season of Mist (SOM 698)	35

=== Charted singles ===
List of charted singles, with selected chart positions
Title	Year	Peak chart positions					Album
Title	Year	AUS Digital	FIN	LTU	SWE Heat.	UK	Album
"Promise"	2023	8	47	28	7	79	Fearless in Love

== Awards and nominations ==
=== APRA Awards ===
The APRA Awards are held in Australia and New Zealand by the Australasian Performing Right Association to recognise songwriting skills, sales and airplay performance by its members annually.

Year	Nominee / work	Award	Result	Ref.
2024	"Promise"	Song of the Year	Shortlisted	

=== National Live Music Awards ===
The National Live Music Awards (NLMAs) commenced in 2016 to recognise contributions to the live music industry in Australia.

Year	Nominee / work	Award	Result	Ref.
2023	Voyager	Best Hard Rock or Heavy Metal Act	Nominated	

Preceded by Sheldon Riley with "Not the Same"	Australia in the Eurovision Song Contest; 2023	Succeeded by Electric Fields with "One Milkali (One Blood)"
