= Ausklang =

Ausklang (German for 'concluding sound') is a work for piano and orchestra composed by Helmut Lachenmann in 1984/1985.

== History ==
It is a commission by the Westdeutscher Rundfunk. Lachenmann dedicated his work to pianist Yukiko Sugawara.

Ausklang was premiered on 18 April 1986 in Cologne by Massimiliano Damerini (piano) and the WDR Symphony Orchestra Cologne conducted by Péter Eötvös.

A performance takes about 50 minutes.

== Discography ==
- Massimiliano Damerini and the WDR Symphony Orchestra Cologne conducted by Péter Eötvös, col legno, 1994.
- Ueli Wiget and Ensemble Modern conducted by Markus Stenz, Ensemble Modern Medien, 2007.
- Pierre-Laurent Aimard and the Bavarian Radio Symphony Orchestra conducted by Jonathan Nott, Neos Musica Viva, 2015.
