= Melbourne Symphony Orchestra =

Australian orchestra

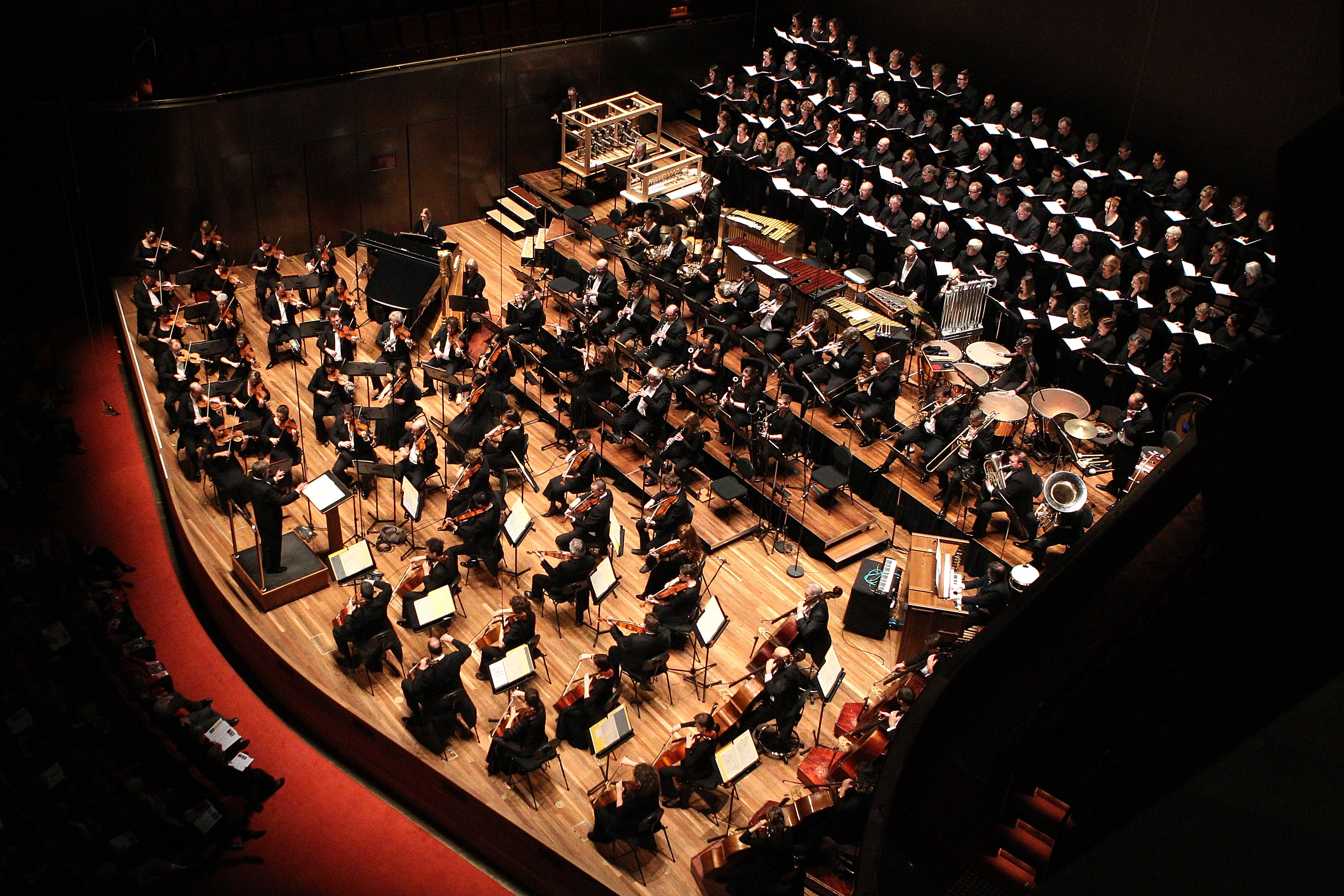
- Andrew Davis conducting the MSO and MSO Chorus
- Short name: MSO
- Former name: Albert Street Conservatorium Orchestra; Victorian Symphony Orchestra
- Founded: 1906
- Location: Melbourne, Australia
- Concert hall: Hamer Hall, Melbourne
- Principal conductor: Jaime Martín
- Website: www.mso.com.au
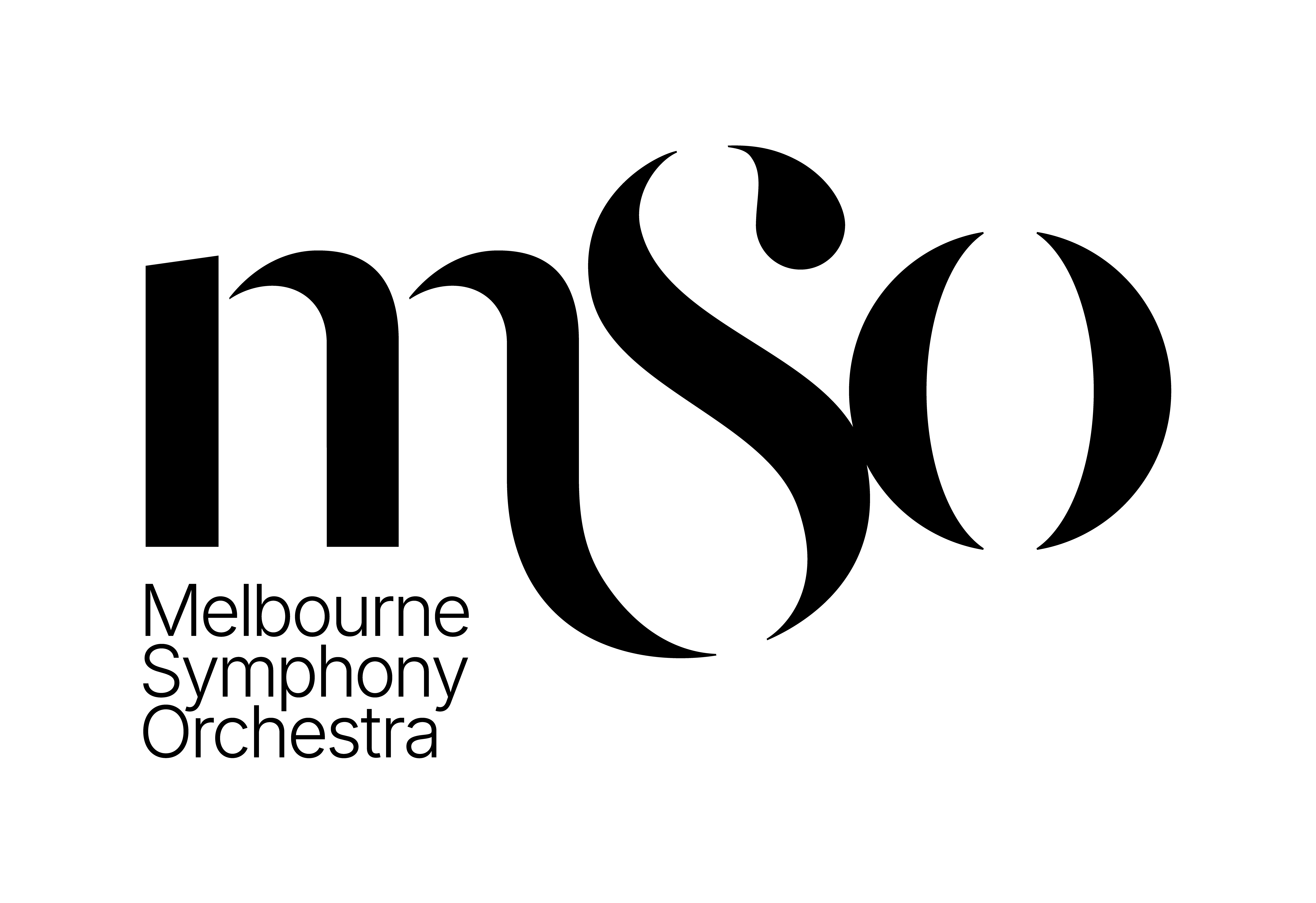

The Melbourne Symphony Orchestra (MSO) is an Australian orchestra based in Melbourne. The MSO is resident at Hamer Hall. The MSO has its own choir, the MSO Chorus, following integration with the Melbourne Chorale in 2008.

The MSO relies on funding by the Victorian State Government and the Federal government and support from private corporations and donors. It is supported by Symphony Services International. Sophie Galaise joined the MSO as its first female managing director in 2016. Its chairman is David Li (since 2021).

== History ==
The founder of the Albert Street Conservatorium Orchestra was musician and conductor Alberto Zelman. This orchestra gave its first concert on 11 December 1906. In 1923, Bertha Jorgensen became the first female leader of a professional orchestra in Australia, and she went on to play with the orchestra for 50 years and became the longest-serving female leader of an orchestra on an international scale. In 1927, the Albert Street Conservatorium Orchestra combined with the Melbourne University Symphony Orchestra to form the Melbourne Symphony Orchestra.

In 1934, the MSO became one of the Australian Broadcasting Commission's radio orchestras. In 1949, the orchestra took on the new name of the Victorian Symphony Orchestra, reverting to the Melbourne Symphony Orchestra in 1965. Following the re-structure of the Australian Broadcasting Commission into a corporation, in 1997 the Melbourne Symphony Orchestra became a wholly owned subsidiary of the ABC. It became an independent company when the six Australia state orchestras were divested from the corporation in 2007.

The MSO's longest-serving chief conductor was Hiroyuki Iwaki (1974–1997), who was named Conductor Laureate of the orchestra in 1989 and held the title until his death in 2006. The orchestra's most recent chief conductor, Sir Andrew Davis, was appointed in June 2012. Davis gave his inaugural concerts as the MSO's chief conductor in 2013, having made his debut with the orchestra in 2009. The MSO also works with principal conductor-in-residence Benjamin Northey, principal guest conductor Xian Zhang and guest conductors like Thomas Adès, John Adams, Tan Dun, Markus Stenz and Simone Young.

The MSO was the first Australian orchestra to perform overseas (New Zealand, 1965), and the first to play in Carnegie Hall, New York, in 1970. Its overseas tours – the US, Canada, Japan, Korea, Europe (2000, 2007, 2014), China (2002), St Petersburg, Russia (2003) and Japan (2005) – have gained it widespread international recognition. In January 2000, under the baton of the then chief conductor and artistic director Markus Stenz, the MSO represented Australasia at the Festival of the Five Continents in the Canary Islands alongside other orchestras such as the Berlin Philharmonic and New York Philharmonic. In January 2007 the Orchestra embarked on its second European tour, visiting five cities in Spain (Castellon, Barcelona, Zaragoza, Pamplona, Madrid), Paris, Berlin and Milan.

Sir Andrew Davis took up his duties as chief conductor in 2013. During his tenure, the MSO made its debut at five of the classical music festivals, including The Proms and the Edinburgh International Festival. In July 2015, the MSO extended Davis' contract through 2019. Davis concluded his MSO chief conductorship at the end of December 2019.

Dr Sophie Galaise was announced as Managing Director in January 2016. In 2021 Dr Galaise was recognised by Musical America as one of the Top 30 Professionals of the Year, and in 2022 she was acknowledged by the Asia Society Australia as a Melbourne Asia Game Changer.

In April 2020, in the wake of the COVID-19 pandemic and the cancellation of live performances, the MSO management was forced to temporarily ‘stand down’ MSO musicians and some administrative staff. In addition to the Australian Government's JobKeeper program, the MSO Board pledged $1 million to support musicians and staff. In December 2020, the MSO launched its on-demand digital streaming platform, MSO.LIVE, which broadcasts performances to audiences at home.

Jaime Martín first guest-conducted the MSO in June 2019, and returned for an additional guest-conducting appearance in February 2021. In June 2021, the MSO announced the appointment of Martín as its next chief conductor, and Martín led his first performance as chief conductor at Hamer Hall in February 2022. In March 2024, the MSO announced the extension of Martín's contract as chief conductor to 2028, with the addition of the title of artistic adviser. In November 2026, the MSO announced that Martín is to conclude his tenure as chief conductor at the close of 2029, and subsequently to take the title of conductor emeritus in 2030.

In November 2022, the MSO announced a partnership with the London Symphony Orchestra. The agreement between the two orchestras enables cross-cultural collaboration between the two countries and includes reciprocal touring in Australia and the UK, facilitating emerging artist exchanges and co-commissioning performances and activities, including digital innovations, such as LSO Live and MSO.LIVE.

The MSO's recent discs include Strauss' Four Last Songs, Don Juan and Also sprach Zarathustra on ABC Classics. On the Chandos label the MSO has recently released Berlioz' Harold en Italie with James Ehnes and Ives' Symphonies No. 1 and No. 2, both led by Sir Andrew Davis.

=== Jayson Gillham controversy ===
On 13 August 2024, the MSO cancelled a performance by Australian-British pianist Jayson Gillham. The orchestra said the reason for the cancellation was the pianist's remarks made prior to his performance with the orchestra the previous evening, which he dedicated to Palestinian journalists killed by Israel in the Gaza war, stating that Gillham's remarks "were made without authority and went beyond the remit of his contract".

The MSO later stated that cancelling the concert was "an error", and that the pianist's performance had been cancelled due to "safety concerns". Despite the reversal of the decision, musicians at the MSO voted to remove the leaders of the orchestra, asserting that the scandal had brought the orchestra "into disrepute" and highlighted "years of unresolved concerns".

Gillham subsequently filed a lawsuit, 'Gillham v Melbourne Symphony Orchestra Pty Ltd (Liability) [2026] FCA 891', on the grounds that the MSO had violated Australia's Fair Work Act over his political beliefs. In July 2026, the Federal Court of Australia ruled in favour of the MSO and against Gillham, on the business grounds that Gillham was an independent contractor and not an MSO employee, and thus not protected under the Fair Work Act, regardless of the particular political position held by Gillham.

== Chief conductors ==
- Alberto Zelman (1906–1927 at Albert Street Conservatorium Orchestra)
- Fritz Hart (1927–1932)
- Fritz Hart, Bernard Heinze (1932–1937, joint chief conductors)
- Joseph Post (1936–1947, close associate conductor)
- Bernard Heinze (1937–1950; Sir Bernard from 1949)
- Alceo Galliera (1950–1951)
- Juan José Castro (1952–1953)
- Walter Susskind (1953–1955)
- Kurt Wöss (1956–1959)
- Georges Tzipine (1960–1965)
- Willem van Otterloo (1967–1970)
- Fritz Rieger (1971–1972)
- Hiroyuki Iwaki (1974–1997)
- Markus Stenz (1998–2004)
- Oleg Caetani (2005–2009)
- Sir Andrew Davis (2013–2019)
- Jaime Martín (2022–present)

== Discography ==
=== Charting albums ===
List of albums, with Australian chart positions
Title	Album details	Peak chart positions	Certifications
Title	Album details	AUS	Certifications
Music for Dreaming	Released: 1995; Format: CD; Label: Sound Impressions/Sony (MDCD001)	98	ARIA: 2× Platinum
Live in Australia (with Meat Loaf)	Released: 1994; Format: CD; Label: Warner Bros. (5046-75070-2)	20	ARIA: Gold
Classical Spectacular	Released: 2005; Format: CD; Label: Decca (4768903)	47	
My Life Is a Symphony (with Kate Ceberano)	Released: May 2023; Format: CD, digital; Label: ABC Music (ABCM0016)	6	

== Awards and nominations ==
=== AIR Awards ===
The Australian Independent Record Awards (commonly known informally as AIR Awards) is an annual awards night to recognise, promote and celebrate the success of Australia's Independent Music sector.

Year	Nominee / work	Award	Result	Ref.
2023	Blueback (Original Motion Picture Score) (with Benjamin Northey and Nigel Westlake)	Best Independent Classical Album or EP	Nominated	
2025	Live in Concert (with Electric Fields)	Best Independent Classical Album or EP	Won	

=== APRA Awards ===
Since 2003 APRA AMCOS (Australasian Performing Right Association and Australasian Mechanical Copyright Owners Society) have combined with AMC (Australian Music Centre) to present the Classical Music Awards at an annual ceremony as part of the APRA Music Awards. In 2011 the Classical Music Awards were re-branded as the Art Music Awards.

Year	Nominee / work	Award	Result	Ref.
2003	"End of All Journeys" (Andrew Batterham) – MSO	Orchestral Work of the Year	Nominated	
2005	Moments of Bliss (Brett Dean) – MSO	Best Performance of an Australian Composition	Nominated	
2006	Oboe Concerto (Ross Edwards – MSO, Diana Doherty	Orchestral Work of the Year	Nominated	
2006	Community Outreach 2005 Program – MSO	Outstanding Contribution to Australian Music in Education	Nominated	
2007	Welcome to the MCG (Christopher Gordon) – MSO, Lyn Williams	Orchestral Work of the Year	Nominated	
2008	90 Minutes Circling the Earth (Stuart Greenbaum) – MSO, Brett Kelly	Orchestral Work of the Year	Won	
2008	Glass Soldier Suite (Nigel Westlake) – MSO, Geoffrey Payne, Jean-Louis Forestier	Orchestral Work of the Year	Nominated	
2008	Musaic (Anne Cawrse) – MSO, Kevin Field	Orchestral Work of the Year	Nominated	
2008	Oboe Concertante (Margaret Sutherland) – MSO, Jiří Tancibudek, Patrick Thomas	Orchestral Work of the Year	Nominated	
2008	Hunger – MSO's ArtPlay ensemble	Outstanding Contribution to Australian Music in Education	Won	
2009	Noumen (Robert Dahm) – MSO, Reinbert de Leeuw	Orchestral Work of the Year	Nominated	
2012	Gardener of Time (Barry Conyngham) – MSO	Work of the Year – Orchestral	Nominated	
2014	The Last Days of Socrates (Brett Dean, Graeme Ellis) – MSO and Chorus, Peter Coleman-Wright, Simone Young	Work of the Year – Orchestral	Nominated	
2014	The Last Days of Socrates (Brett Dean, Graeme Ellis) – MSO and Chorus, Peter Coleman-Wright, Simone Young	Performance of the Year	Won	
2022	The Rest Is Silence (Anne Cawrse) – MSO, Michael Pisani, Nicholas Carter	Work of the Year: Large Ensemble	Nominated	
2022	Love Is a Temporary Madness, The Symphonic Suite (Vanessa Perica) – MSO, Vanessa Perica Orchestra, Benjamin Northey	Performance of the Year: Jazz / Improvised Music	Nominated	
2022	WATA (Paul Grabowsky, Daniel Wilfred, David Wilfred) – MSO, Australian Art Orchestra, Paul Grabowsky, Daniel Wilfred, David Wilfred, Benjamin Northey	Performance of the Year: Notated Composition	Won	

=== ARIA Music Awards ===
The ARIA Music Awards is an annual awards ceremony that recognises excellence, innovation, and achievement across all genres of Australian music. They commenced in 1987.

Year	Nominee / work	Award	Result	Ref.
1991	Percy Grainger: Orchestral Works (with Geoffrey Simon)	Best Classical Album	Nominated	
1994	Violin Concertos (with Dene Olding & Hiroyuki Iwaki)	Best Classical Album	Nominated	
1995	Simple Gifts (with Yvonne Kenny & Vladimir Kamirski)	Best Classical Album	Won	
1999	The Eternal Rhythm (with Vernon Handley)	Best Classical Album	Nominated	
2001	Music from the Motion Picture – The Dish	Best Original Soundtrack	Won	
2013	Catch Me If You Can (with Amy Dickson)	Best Classical Album	Nominated	
2013	Missa Solis: Requiem for Eli (with Nigel Westlake)	Best Classical Album	Nominated	
2014	Ades Polaris / Stanhope Piccolo Concerto (with Andrew Macleod, Benjamin Northey & Markus Stenz)	Best Classical Album	Nominated	
2015	Paper Planes – Original Motion Picture Soundtrack (with Nigel Westlake)	Best Original Soundtrack, Cast or Show Album	Nominated	
2017	Medtner: Piano Concerto No. 1 / Rachmaninoff: Piano Concerto No. 2 (with Jayson Gillham & Benjamin Northey)	Best Classical Album	Nominated	
2022	Ross Edwards: Frog and Star Cycle / Symphonies 2 & 3 (with Amy Dickson, Colin Currie, Lothar Koenigs, Yvonne Kenny, David Zinman, Sydney Symphony Orchestra, & Markus Stenz)	Best Classical Album	Nominated	
2022	The Enchanted Loom: Orchestral Works by Carl Vine (with Sir Andrew Davis)	Best Classical Album	Won	
2023	Blueback – Original Motion Picture Soundtrack By Nigel Westlake (with Benjamin Northey)	Best Original Soundtrack, Cast or Show Album	Nominated	
2025	Live in Concert (with Electric Fields)	Best World Music Album	Nominated	
2026	Double J Live at the Wireless (with Mo'Ju and Nicholas Buc )	Best World Music Album	Nominated	

=== Helpmann Awards ===
- 2003 Nominated twice for Best Classical Concert Presentation
- 2004 Nominated for Best Performance in a Classical Concert – MSO Chief Conductor Marcus Stenz
- 2007 Winner of Best Performance in a Classical Concert Presentation
- 2008 Winner of Best Performances in a Classical Concert
- 2011 Nominated twice for Best Symphony Orchestra Concert
- 2015 Nominated twice for Best Symphony Orchestra Concert
