= Fearless in Love =

Studio album by Voyager
- Released: 14 July 2023
- Recorded: 2020–2022
- Studio: Hopping Mouse, Hamilton Hill, Western Australia; Lincoln (keys)
- Genre: Progressive metal
- Length: 44:25
- Label: Season of Mist
- Producer: Voyager; Matthew Templeman

Voyager chronology
Colours in the Sun (2019)	Fearless in Love (2023)

Singles from Fearless in Love
- 1. "Dreamer" Released: 21 January 2022; 2. "Submarine" Released: 14 July 2022; 3. "Promise" Released: 21 February 2023; 4. "Prince of Fire" Released: 4 May 2023; 5. "Ultraviolet" Released: 10 July 2023

Fearless in Love is the eighth studio album by Australian progressive metal band Voyager, released on 14 July 2023 through Season of Mist. It includes the singles "Promise", Australia's entry at the 2023 Eurovision Song Contest, as well as "Dreamer", which the band submitted for Australia's Eurovision song selection competition, Eurovision – Australia Decides 2022.

== Critical reception ==
Professional ratings
Review scores
Source	Rating
Hysteria	8/10
The Music	4.5/5 stars
Prog	4/5 stars
Wall of Sound	9/10

Rod Whitfield of The Music described the album as "eleven tracks and around 45 minutes of pure catharsis and exhilaration. It is a soaring statement of intent from a band on a mission and enjoying every single living second of it" and concluded that the album "should go down as an all-time Aussie classic". Tiana Speter of Hysteria wrote that "while the candy-coated prog and flashy displays throughout the new album are undeniably suited for the extravagant trappings of Eurovision, there's a refreshing and irresistible progression on firm display", summarising that "Voyager have boldly tripped the light fantastic and emerged something that will appeal to lovers of prog, pop bangers and everything in between". KJ Draven of Wall of Sound felt that Fearless in Love "isn't so much of a shift from their previous work, but a continued evolution from Colours in the Sun (2019)" and that it "has enough riffs, synths and hooks to catch the ear of anyone with a passing interest in 80s style rock and metal without ever sounding like a complete vintage act".

== Track listing ==
All lyrics are written by Danny Estrin; all music is composed by Voyager (Alex Canion, Simone Dowe, Ashley Doodkorte, Danny Estrin, and Scott Kay)

Fearless in Love track listing
No.	Title	Length
1.	"The Best Intentions"	3:48
2.	"Prince of Fire"	4:45
3.	"Ultraviolet" (featuring Sean Harmanis)	4:15
4.	"Dreamer"	3:00
5.	"The Lamenting"	4:10
6.	"Submarine"	4:46
7.	"Promise"	3:03
8.	"Twisted"	3:54
9.	"Daydream"	3:08
10.	"Listen"	4:13
11.	"Gren (Fearless in Love)"	5:23
Total length:		44:25

Notes

- "Promise" does not feature on the first run of vinyl.

== Personnel ==
Voyager

- Danny Estrin – keys, vocals
- Simone Dow – guitar
- Scott Kay – guitar
- Alex Canion – bass guitar, vocals
- Ashley Doodkorte – drums

== Charts ==
Chart performance for Fearless in Love
Chart (2023)	Peak position
Australian Albums (ARIA)	35
UK Album Downloads (OCC)	21
UK Independent Albums (OCC)	29
UK Rock & Metal Albums (OCC)	12
