= Zaachariaha Fielding =

Australian musician and artist

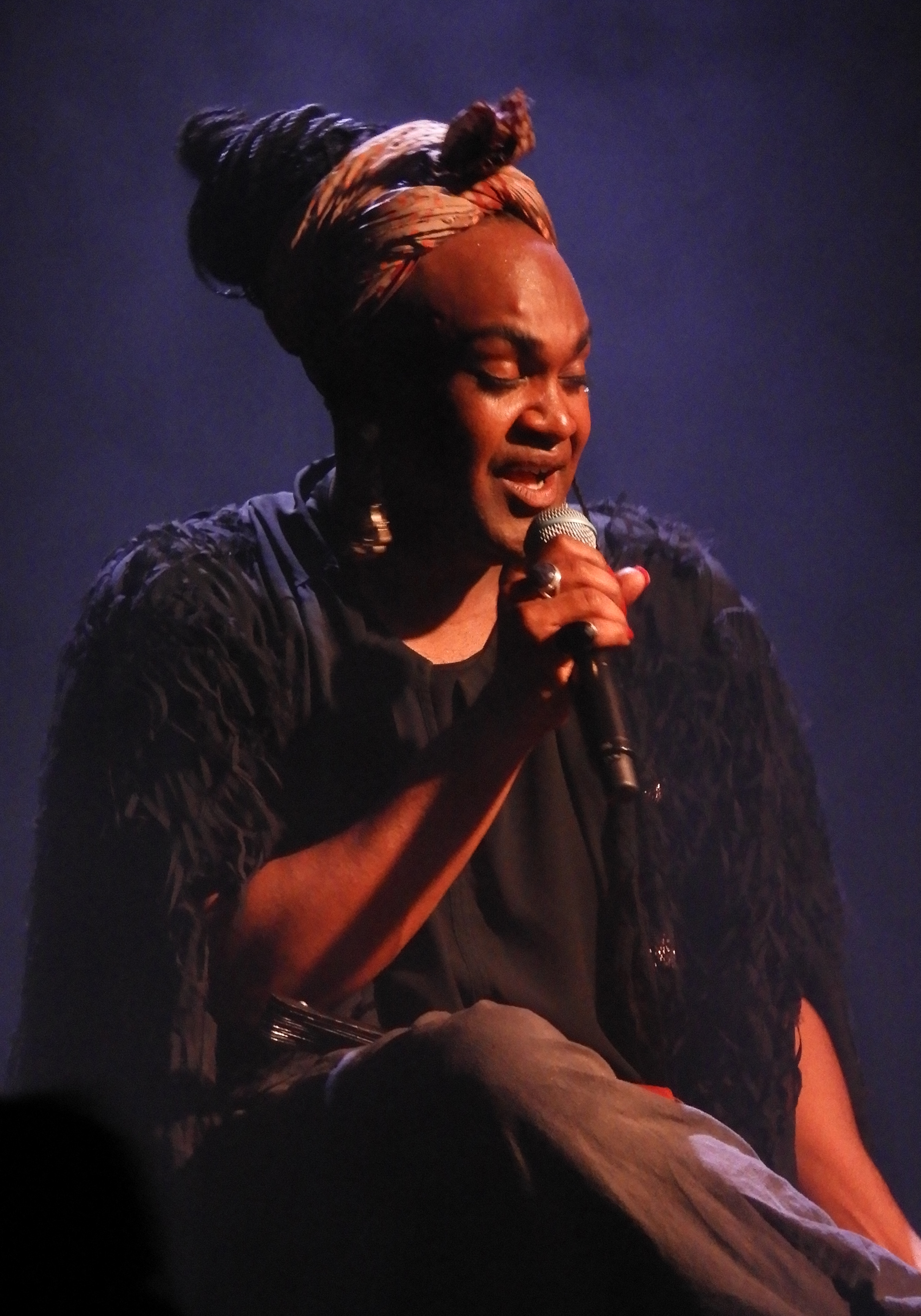
- Fielding performing "Nina" in Adelaide, South Australia

Background information
- Born: Zaachariaha Rameth Fielding; Quorn, South Australia, Australia
- Genres: Electric-soul, Aboriginal music
- Occupations: Musician, artist
- Instrument: Vocals

Zaachariaha Rameth Fielding (born 1991/1992) is an Aboriginal Australian musician and artist. He is best known as vocalist in the duo Electric Fields, with keyboard player and producer Michael Ross. As a visual artist, he began painting in 2020 and his work was selected as a finalist for the Ramsay Art Prize in 2021.

== Early life and education ==
Zaachariaha Fielding was born in 1991 or 1992, the son of artist Robert Fielding and Kaye Lowah and the oldest of nine children. After attending primary school in Quorn, South Australia, for a few years, at the age of eight he moved with his family to Mimili, in the remote Aboriginal homelands known as the APY lands, in north-west South Australia. His paternal grandfather Bruce was removed from his family at age three and placed in the Colebrook Home in Quorn, South Australia, and never returned to Mimili, a child of the Stolen Generations.

His first performance was at a school assembly aged seven or eight, when he sang Elvis Presley's "Blue Suede Shoes", and later said that he knew that he wanted to be a performer from a young age. He was strongly impressed by Whitney Houston growing up, and also watched many different bands which featured on the long-running TV music show Rage.

After moving to Adelaide at the age of 13 or 14 for boarding school, he found the transition to a western society dominated by rules and clocks challenging, and still does sometimes. He graduated from Woodville High School, which he saw as "having to become an adult overnight – being thrown in at the deep end and having to learn how to survive in the western world". He studied Indigenous Australian music and started producing his own work at the Centre for Aboriginal Studies in Music at the University of Adelaide.

== Music ==
Fielding featured on TV music talent show The Voice, making it to the grand final with as the duo ZK, with Kristal West, in 2014.

Fielding and Michael Ross have been performing as Electric Fields since 2015, combining modern electric-soul music with Aboriginal culture and singing in Pitjantjatjara and Yankunytjatjara besides English.

They have been nominated for and won several awards, including the National Indigenous Music Awards 2017 (Best New Talent); National Dreamtime Awards 2019 (Male Music Artist); National Live Music Awards (several wins, both Fielding individually and the duo); and the South Australian Music Awards. They also came second in the Eurovision – Australia Decides contest which selected the act which would represent Australia in the Eurovision Song Contest 2019. They were eventually selected internally by SBS to represent Australia at the 2024 contest, with the song "One Milkali (One Blood)".

== Art ==
During the COVID-19 pandemic in Australia in 2020, he went to stay with his family and started painting with his nieces and nephews. Returning to Adelaide, he joined a group of artists at the APY Art Centre Collective in Adelaide, taking the opportunity to develop his talents in visual art. Fielding is represented by Hugo Michell Gallery and Jan Murphy Gallery.

His work integrates traditional elements and lore (Tjukurpa) with his personal style and his own view of Country, influenced by his memories of growing up in Mimili. In 2023 he said:

I approach my practice in a way where there is no division. I don't like to think of myself as an LGBTQ person or an Aboriginal person or a person of colour. That's not where I am at any more. I am looking beyond that.

=== Exhibitions ===
Fielding's first exhibition, Zaachariaha Fielding: Gold and Silver Linings, was mounted at the gallery from November to December 2020. He is represented by Hugo Michell Gallery and Jan Murphy Gallery.

Fielding's paintings, along with ceramic art Arrernte artist Alfred Lowe from the Central Desert, were displayed in an exhibition called Z munu A Titutjara ("Z and A Forever"), held at the Hugo Michell Gallery in Adelaide in October–November 2023, as part of Tarnanthi.

=== Art awards ===
His work was selected as a finalist for the Ramsay Art Prize at the Art Gallery of South Australia in 2021.

In May 2023 Fielding won the prestigious Wynne Prize for his acrylic painting representing the sounds of Mimili, titled Inma.

In August 2023 it was announced that his multi-panel work Wonder Drug had won the Ramsay Art Prize A$15,000 People's Choice prize at the Art Gallery of South Australia.

He was a finalist for the 2024 Hadley's Art Prize for landscape.

== Other recognition ==
In 2016, Fielding was one of four finalists in the Department of Human Services Aboriginal Achievement Award for the South Australian Young Achiever Awards, impressing judges with "how he shares his culture and language through music – breaking down cultural barriers and giving inspiration to young Aboriginal people".

In 2019, he was awarded the Rowdy Group Creative Achievement Award in the 7NEWS Young Achiever Awards.

== Film and television ==
Fielding was selected by Baz Luhrmann to sing "Somewhere over the Rainbow" in the Yolngu language in his 2008 film Australia.

He provided additional music for the 2010 documentary short film Ngura Ini Mimili Nya: A Place Called Mimili, about a group of children in Mimili preparing to compete in the annual Ernabella Dance Competition.

Electric Fields are the subject of a 2018 SBS/NITV documentary, "Voice From The Desert", part of the Our Stories series, featuring emerging Indigenous Australian creatives. It follows Fielding on a visit to Mimili, where he examines his early life experiences growing up in remote South Australia and his artistic and personal growth, and includes interviews with his parents.

The 2019 short film "Electric Mimili", part of the Deadly Family Portraits series, was shown on ABC Television and iview. This film, directed by Isaac Cohen Lindsay and produced by Sierra Schrader, focuses on his and his father's family and life in Mimili, and how both father and son have been influenced by these. The series of three films included one Elaine Crombie and her mother Lillian Crombie, and another about dancers Taree and Caleena Sansbury.

Fielding and Ross wrote the songs "Shade Away" and "Don't You Worry", which are featured in the soundtrack for the 2019 feature film Top End Wedding, performed by Electric Fields.

He appears as himself, as part of the duo Electric Fields, in Taryn Brumfitts' 2022 film about body image, Embrace: Kids.
