= Jayson Gillham =

Australian pianist (born 1986)

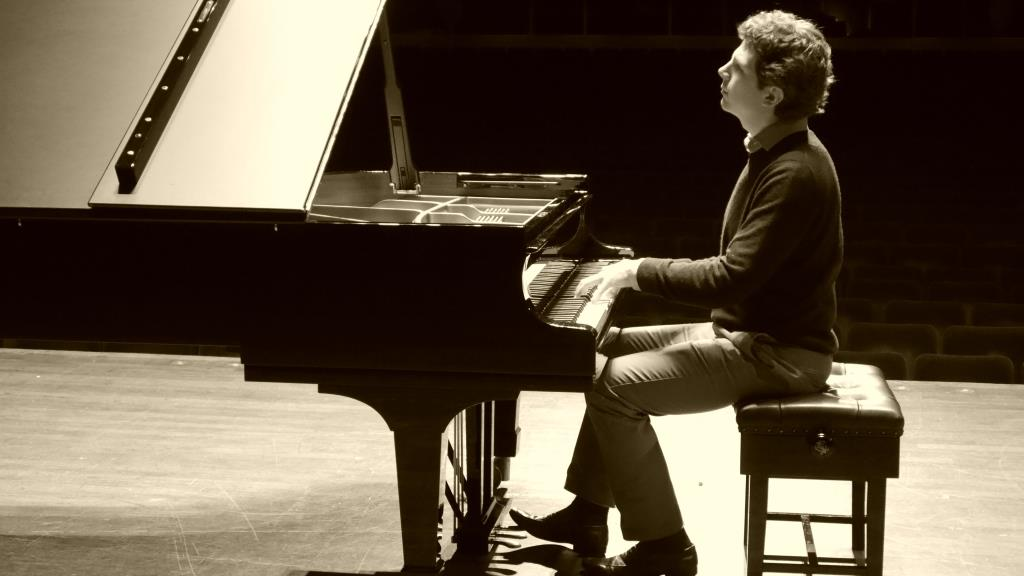

Background information
- Born: Jayson Lloyd Gillham; 15 August 1986 (age 40); Dalby, Queensland, Australia
- Occupation: Classical concert pianist
- Instrument: Piano
- Website: jaysongillham.com
- Education: Queensland Conservatorium; Royal Academy of Music

Jayson Lloyd Gillham (born 1986) is an Australian-British classical pianist, based in London. In 2014, Gillham was the winner of the 2014 Montreal International Musical Competition.

== Early life ==
Jayson Gillham was born in Dalby, Queensland. He started piano lessons at the age of four. In 1993, he commenced formal piano lessons from Eugene Gienger in Toowoomba. Jayson then studied with Leah Horwitz from 2001-2007, culminating in his Bachelor Degree from the Queensland Conservatorium of Music.

He relocated to London in 2007 to the Royal Academy of Music, studying with Christopher Elton. Gillham graduated with a Master Degree in Music. He was supported in his studies by the Tait Memorial Trust, and the Australian Music Foundation.

== Career ==
In 2012 Gillham was Commonwealth Musician of the Year and Gold Medalist of the Royal Over-Seas League 60th Annual Music Competition. In 2014 he won the Montreal Piano Competition. He also reached the finals of some of the world's leading piano competitions, such as the Leeds International Piano Competition and Van Cliburn International Piano Competition.

Concerto engagements with international orchestras include the London Philharmonic Orchestra, Royal Philharmonic Orchestra, Montreal Symphony Orchestra, Melbourne Symphony Orchestra, Sydney Symphony Orchestra, Adelaide Symphony Orchestra, Queensland Symphony Orchestra, and the Auckland Philharmonia Orchestra.

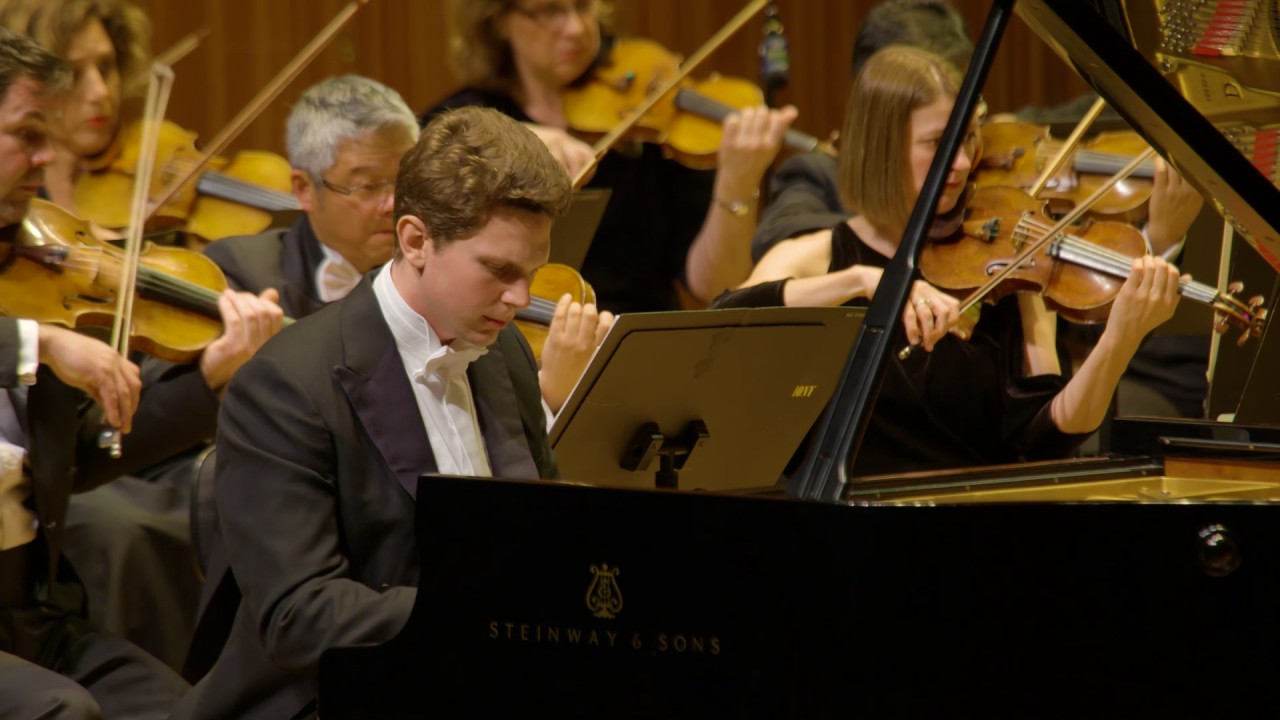
Jayson Gillham performing with the Sydney Symphony Orchestra at Sydney Opera House

In May 2015, Gillham signed a three-album exclusive recording contract with ABC Classics. His debut recital album featuring works of Bach, Schubert, and Chopin was released in October 2016. This first release was soon followed by his live recording of Beethoven's Piano Concerto No. 4 with the Sydney Symphony Orchestra under the baton of Vladimir Ashkenazy. Gillham performed the Beethoven Concerto No. 3 with the Adelaide Symphony Orchestra conducted by Sir Jeffrey Tate. His most recent CD, recorded in 2017 of works by Medtner and Rachmaninoff with the Melbourne Symphony Orchestra under Benjamin Northey was Recording of the Month in Limelight magazine. Medtner's Piano Concerto No. 1, as included in this release, will also feature in a documentary film about the life of the renowned Australian pianist Geoffrey Tozer.

In May 2018, Gillham made his debut with the Bournemouth Symphony Orchestra conducted by Victor Aviat. He also joined the Royal Philharmonic Orchestra on a UK tour with the British conductor Alexander Shelley. At the 2020 ARIA Music Awards, Gillham with Adelaide Symphony Orchestra and Nicholas Carter were nominated for Best Classical Album for Beethoven Piano Concertos.

== Conservatoire appointment ==
In 2024 Gillham was appointed Lecturer of Keyboard at Glasgow's Royal Conservatoire of Scotland.

== Cancelled performance controversy ==
In August 2024, Gillham performed a new work by Connor D'Netto in recital at the Iwaki Auditorium, booked by the Melbourne Symphony Orchestra (MSO). As often, he spoke prior to performing the piece (as he had done before the interval when referencing composer György Ligeti's family plight during the Holocaust), which he dedicated to Palestinian journalists killed by Israel in Gaza. In the speech Gillham said:

Over the last 10 months, Israel has killed more than 100 Palestinian journalists. A number of these have been targeted assassinations of prominent journalists as they were traveling in marked press vehicles or wearing their press jackets. The killing of journalists is a war crime in international law, and it is done in an effort to prevent the documentation and broadcasting of war crimes to the world. In addition to the role of journalists who bear witness, the word 'witness' in Arabic is 'shaheed,' which also means 'martyr'.

The MSO management then cancelled a later scheduled performance with Gillham and the MSO.

In an interview with journalist David Marr on ABC RN's Late Night Live, Gillham stated that the MSO's actions had actually highlighted the plight of Palestinian journalists, adding that he is "actually so grateful for that." After intense backlash from the musician community, the Orchestra later claimed it had committed an "error" by cancelling Gillham's concert and stated it was working to reschedule it. Musicians at the MSO then expressed a vote of no confidence in the orchestra's managing director.

In September, responding to a letter from Gillham's lawyers suggesting a way for MSO to resolve the matter and thus dispense with further legal action, MSO's lawyers revived their initial position by stating their view that his remarks were an abuse of his appointed function.

On 3 October 2024 Gillham sued the MSO, alleging that he was discriminated against based on political belief or activity, contrary to the Equal Opportunity Act 2010 (Victoria) and the Fair Work Act 2009 (Commonwealth). He said he had been "silenced for speaking the truth", and that the cancellation of his performance over his political views "strikes at the heart of our right to free speech."

=== Case to Trial ===
In May 2025 the Federal Court rejected an action by the MSO and its chief operating officer, Guy Ross, to have Gillham's case dismissed without trial, arguing that Gillham's claim had no prospect of success under federal workplace laws. The case will now go to trial on 1 December 2025.

=== Trial Postponed ===
The Federal Court of Australia announced on 12 November 2025 a postponement of the Gillham vs MSO trial until 2026. The proceedings are now expected to run from one to three weeks after the orchestra announced plans to call at least 20 witnesses, including senior board members, executives and advisors.

=== Trial Scheduled and Concluded ===
The Federal Court of Australia announced the scheduling of Gillham vs MSO trial, commencing 18 May 2026. On 10 July 2026, the Federal Court under Justice Graeme Hill threw out Gillham's case against the MSO, finding he was not unfairly dismissed due to Gaza war comments.

== The Visitation and other performances ==
In 2024 Gillham appeared with British playwright Tama Matheson in "The Visitation" - a play about the ghost of Beethoven making contact with a contemporary pianist. The ensuing conversations, interspersed with live music performed by Gillham, lead to an exploration of the meaning of life and the essence of art. This association led to several other plays, penned by Matheson, in which Gillham acted and performed.

In August 2026, Gillham will perform in "Tchaikovsky: Child of Glass" with writer and actor Tama Matheson and the same team that produced previous productions based on the lives of famous composers.

== 2025 Artist of The Year ==
In 2025 Gillham was voted Limelight Magazine Artist of The Year, being the first ever to win both Critic's Choice and People's Choice awards.

== 2026 Australian Tour ==
In 2026 Gillham announced a planned tour of Australia with collaborative pianist Iyad Sughayer. The two piano recital will play in Brisbane, Sydney, Melbourne and Adelaide. Gillham stated "I’ve always loved playing the piano and I’ve loved sharing music with audiences, and now I feel like I understand what art is a bit more, like I have another perspective on it. It’s certainly broadened and probably deepened and matured my understanding of the role of artists in society.” The tour successfully began at the Melbourne Recital Centre on Sunday, 19 July.

== Discography ==
=== Albums ===
List of albums with selected details
Title	Details
Jayson Lloyd Gillham Debut Recital	Released: 1996; Label: Bernard Snep; Formats: CC
Études de Concert	Released: 2005; Label: Lodestar Recordings; Formats: CD
Beethoven | Chopin | Debussy	Released: 2010; Label: CRC London; Formats: CD
The Romantic Virtuoso Pianist	Released: 2012; Label: CRC London; Formats: CD
Bach | Schubert | Chopin	Released: 2016; Label: ABC Classics; Formats: CD
Beethoven Piano Concerto No.4 (Live) (with Sydney Symphony Orchestra and Vladimir Ashkenazy at Sydney Opera House)	Released: 2016; Label: ABC Classics; Formats: DD
Medtner: Piano Concerto No.1; Rachmaninoff: Piano Concerto No. 2 (with Melbourne Symphony Orchestra and Benjamin Northey)	Released: 2017; Label: ABC Classics; Formats: CD, DD
Romantic Bach: From Intimate to Epic	Released: 2018; Label: ABC Classics; Formats: CD, DD
Beethoven: The Piano Concertos (Live) (with Adelaide Symphony Orchestra and Nicholas Carter)	Released: 2020; Label: ABC Classics; Formats: CD, DD
Witness	Released: 2024; Label: Phaedra; Formats: DD
Chopin Etudes	Released: 2025; Label: ABC Classics; Formats: CD DD

== Awards ==
=== AIR Awards ===
The Australian Independent Record Awards (known colloquially as the AIR Awards) is an annual awards night to recognise, promote and celebrate the success of Australia's Independent Music sector.

Year	Nominee / work	Award	Result	Ref.
2021	Beethoven: The Piano Concertos (with Adelaide Symphony Orchestra and Nicholas Carter)	Best Independent Classical Album or EP	Nominated	

=== Limelight Magazine Artist of The Year ===
Sydney based music magazine founded in 1976 as ABC Radio 24 Hours and since 2018 published independently by Limelight Arts Media.

Year	Nominee / work	Award	Result	Ref.
2025	Limelight Magazine	Critic's Choice	Won	
2025	Limelight Magazine	People's Choice	Won	

=== ARIA Music Awards ===
The ARIA Music Awards is an annual awards ceremony that recognises excellence, innovation, and achievement across all genres of Australian music. They commenced in 1987.

Year	Nominee / work	Award	Result	Ref.
2017	Medtner: Piano Concerto No 1 / Rachmaninoff: Piano Concerto No 2 (with Melbourne Symphony Orchestra & Benjamin Northey)	Best Classical Album	Nominated	
2021	Beethoven Piano Concertos (with Adelaide Symphony Orchestra & Nicholas Carter)	Best Classical Album	Nominated	
2026	Chopin Etudes	Best Classical Album	Nominated	

== Personal life ==
Gillham lives in London with his partner, Sid Mohandas, whom he married in 2016. Gillham actively supports the LGBTI community and expressed his strong support in favour for the 'Yes' campaign in Australia's Marriage Equality Postal Survey. In an interview with the Dalby Herald, Gillham said, 'It's a significant survey because it shows that Australians are on the whole socially liberal, hopeful and forward-looking".
