= Benjamin Northey =

Australian conductor, musician and arranger (born 1970)

Benjamin Northey (born 1970) is an Australian conductor, musician and arranger. In 2025, he was appointed conductor-in-residence of the Sydney Symphony Orchestra, professor of conducting at the Sydney Conservatorium of Music, and director of the Australian Conducting Academy. He has been chief conductor of the Christchurch Symphony Orchestra in New Zealand since 2015. He is also the principal guest conductor of the Melbourne Symphony Orchestra (MSO) having previously been principal conductor-in-residence from 2020 to 2023. He was previously the associate conductor of the Melbourne Symphony Orchestra from 2010 to 2019.

== Early life and family ==
Northey was born and raised in Ballarat, Victoria. His father Robert (Bob) Northey is a retired university administrator and former president of the Ballarat Symphony Orchestra and his mother Wendy is a forensic psychologist and pianist. His uncle is the retired AFL football player and coach John Northey.

He attended Ballarat Clarendon College where he studied flute, clarinet and saxophone with Barry Currie and arranging with Graeme Vendy, and where his skills as a saxophonist, clarinettist and flautist were first developed; in his early years he also played piano, trumpet and violin. At 12, he won prizes in Ballarat's Royal South Street Eisteddfod for performances on flute and saxophone. During his teenage years he began working professionally in local pit orchestras in Ballarat for musical theatre and operetta productions. After leaving school, he moved to Melbourne where he worked as a freelance musician, composer and arranger for close to ten years. During this time he was an active recording session musician and also performed with the Melbourne Symphony Orchestra, the Australian Pops Orchestra and the Australian Showband. He appeared as a soloist with the Australian Wind Orchestra on their tour of Japan and Hong Kong in 1990. In 1998 he toured Australia and the United States as keyboardist and saxophonist with guitarist Tommy Emmanuel.

== Training ==
In 1996 Northey commenced performance studies in classical saxophone at the University of Melbourne Faculty of Music, graduating in 1999 with First Class Honours. It was only in the final year of his degree, at age 29, that he turned to conducting. This occurred under the mentorship of John Hopkins, who encouraged him to be the first candidate for his new Master of Music in Conducting degree at the University of Melbourne Faculty of Music. He graduated in 2002.

In 2001 he won the Nelly Apt Scholarship for study in Israel. The same year he won the Symphony Australia Young Conductor of the year competition, marking the first time the two most prestigious Australian conducting prizes had been won by the same person in the same year. Part of the prize for the latter award was the opportunity to study in Sydney with Jorma Panula, under the aegis of the Symphony Australia Conductor Development Program.

In 2002 he was the highest placed applicant to the orchestral conducting course at the Sibelius Academy in Helsinki, Finland. He studied there for three years under Leif Segerstam and Atso Almila. In 2004 his diploma concert with the Sibelius Academy Symphony Orchestra was awarded the international jury's highest possible mark. The program included the European premiere of Brett Dean's Amphitheatre. He completed his tertiary studies in 2006 as a guest student in Jorma Panula's class at Sweden's Royal College of Music, Stockholm.

In 2007 he was chosen from a worldwide field as one of three participants in the International Conductor's Academy of the Allianz Cultural Foundation. This involved a year-long mentorship with the London Philharmonic Orchestra (LPO) and the Philharmonia Orchestra, with conductors Christoph von Dohnányi and Vladimir Jurowski. It culminated in a performance of Stravinsky's Symphony in C in June 2008 at the Royal Festival Hall in London.

== Conducting ==
In 2002 Northey first displayed his interest in contemporary music by conducting the world premiere of Mark Elliott's Concerto for Chinese Sheng and Orchestra with the University of Melbourne Symphony Orchestra. From 2002 to 2006, he was resident guest conductor of the Australian Pro Arte Chamber Orchestra (later renamed the Melbourne Chamber Orchestra, of which he was principal guest conductor from 2007 to 2010). His major professional conducting debut came in 2003 with the Melbourne Symphony Orchestra, in a concert at the Sidney Myer Music Bowl that included Beethoven's 6th Symphony. In 2005 he made his official European conducting debut with the Mozarteum Orchestra Salzburg. He was also a visiting artist at the Australian National Academy of Music and a guest lecturer in conducting at the University of Melbourne.

Since returning to Australia in 2006, Northey has been a regular guest conductor with all the Australian state symphony orchestras. He has also led opera productions including Candide, La bohème, Turandot, Carmen, L'elisir d'amore, The Tales of Hoffmann, La sonnambula, Sweeney Todd, Orpheus in the Underworld, Don Giovanni and Così fan tutte, for companies such as the State Opera of South Australia, Opera Australia Victorian Opera and New Zealand Opera and the ballet A Midsummer Night's Dream for the Queensland Ballet. In 2006 he worked with Hilltop Hoods and the Adelaide Symphony Orchestra to create an orchestral take on the Hoods' platinum-selling album The Hard Road Restrung. This unique collaboration won an ARIA Award. His orchestral arrangements have been used by Tim Minchin, k.d. lang, Lior Attar, The Whitlams and Dan Sultan.

In 2011 he was appointed associate conductor of the MSO (officially the Patricia Riordan Associate Conductor Chair). In 2017 the position was extended to the end of the 2017 season. This position was created especially for Northey, and is the only associate conductor position in any Australian state orchestra. In 2012 he was a last-minute replacement when Scottish conductor Donald Runnicles fell ill before an MSO Master Series concert, which included Mahler's 4th Symphony and Shostakovich's Violin Concerto No. 1 performed by Julian Rachlin. He is credited with re-invigorating the MSO Town Hall concert series.

In his conducting debut in America, Northey led in May 2026 the Jazz at Lincoln Center Orchestra with Wynton Marsalis and the Pittsburgh Symphony Orchestra in a one-off performance at Heinz Hall of Marsalis's All Rise, a work that Northey had conducted in Melbourne and Sydney in 2023.

Contemporary compositions he has premiered include works by Deborah Cheetham, Peter Sculthorpe, Catherine Milliken, Brett Dean, Elena Kats-Chernin, Matthew Hindson, and Brenton Broadstock. On 5 November 2014 he was seen by a national television audience when he conducted the Sydney Symphony Orchestra and Sydney Philharmonia Choir in the Sydney Town Hall at the state memorial service for former Prime Minister Gough Whitlam.

=== Other orchestras conducted ===
Northey has been a guest conductor with the following orchestras:

- Adelaide Symphony Orchestra
- Auckland Symphony Orchestra
- Australian Opera & Ballet Orchestra
- Christchurch Symphony Orchestra
- Finnish Radio Symphony Orchestra
- Futurum Ensemble Sinfonietta, Stockholm
- Haifa Symphony Orchestra
- Hong Kong Philharmonic Orchestra
- London Philharmonic Orchestra
- Malaysian Philharmonic Orchestra
- Moscow Symphony Orchestra
- National Symphony Orchestra of Colombia
- New Zealand Symphony Orchestra
- Orchestra Victoria
- Queensland Symphony Orchestra
- Södra Hälsinglands Orkesterförening
- Southbank Sinfonia
- Sydney Symphony Orchestra
- Tasmanian Symphony Orchestra
- Tokyo Philharmonic Orchestra
- West Australian Symphony Orchestra

=== Artists collaborated with ===
Northey has collaborated with numerous artists including:

- Lang Lang
- Wynton Marsalis
- Maxim Vengerov
- Piers Lane
- Emma Matthews
- Wynton Marsalis
- Steven Isserlis
- Javier Perianes
- Pinchas Zukerman
- Stefan Dohr
- Professor Brian Cox
- Alban Gerhardt
- Paul Grabowsky
- Marc-André Hamelin
- Amy Dickson
- Deborah Cheetham
- William Barton
- Slava Grigoryan
- Siobhan Stagg
- Karin Schaupp
- Julian Rachlin
- Arnaldo Cohen
- Karen Gomyo
- Johannes Moser
- k.d. lang
- Patti Austin
- James Morrison
- Kurt Elling
- Eddie Perfect
- Barry Humphries (Note: As Dame Edna Everage narrating The Carnival of the Animals)
- Tim Minchin (Note: In Tim Minchin versus the Melbourne Symphony Orchestra tour)
- Sting
- Lalah Hathaway
- Tori Amos
- The Whitlams
- Sébastien Hurtaud
- Circa

== Awards and nominations ==
=== AIR Awards ===
The Australian Independent Record Awards (commonly known informally as AIR Awards) is an annual awards night to recognise, promote and celebrate the success of Australia's Independent Music sector.

| Year | Nominee / work | Award | Result |
|---|---|---|---|
| 2018 | Live at the Sydney Opera House (with Kate Miller-Heidke & Sydney Symphony Orchestra) | Best Independent Classical Album | Nominated |
| 2019 | Bach Concertos (with Grigoryan Brothers and Adelaide Symphony Orchestra) | Best Independent Classical Album | Won |
| 2021 | Live at the Sydney Opera House (with Joseph Tawadros, James Tawadros & Sydney Symphony Orchestra) | Best Independent Classical Album | Won |
| 2023 | Blueback (Original Motion Picture Score) (with Melbourne Symphony Orchestra and Nigel Westlake ) | Best Independent Classical Album | Nominated |

=== ARIA Music Awards ===
The ARIA Music Awards is an annual awards ceremony that recognises excellence, innovation, and achievement across all genres of Australian music. They commenced in 1987.

| Year | Nominee / work | Award | Result | Ref. |
|---|---|---|---|---|
| 2008 | Baroque Guitar Concertos (with Slava Grigoryan & Tasmanian Symphony Orchestra) | Best Classical Album | Nominated | |
| 2014 | Ades Polaris / Stanhope Piccolo Concerto (with Andrew Macleod, Melbourne Symphony Orchestra & Markus Stenz) | Best Classical Album | Nominated | |
| 2017 | Medtner: Piano Concerto No 1 / Rachmaninoff: Piano Concerto No 2 (with Jayson Gillham & Melbourne Symphony Orchestra) | Best Classical Album | Nominated | |
| 2018 | Ella and Louis (with James Morrison, Patti Austin & Melbourne Symphony Orchestra) | Best Jazz Album | Nominated | |
| 2019 | Bach Concertos (with Grigoryan Brothers & Adelaide Symphony Orchestra) | Best Classical Album | Nominated | |
| 2020 | Joseph Tawadros Live at the Sydney Opera House (with Joseph Tawadros & Sydney Symphony Orchestra) | Best World Music Album | Won | |
| 2023 | Blueback – Original Motion Picture Soundtrack By Nigel Westlake (with Melbourne Symphony Orchestra) | Best Original Soundtrack, Cast or Show Album | Nominated | |
| 2024 | Mary Finsterer - Stabat Mater (with Melbourne Symphony Orchestra and Choir of Trinity College, Melbourne) | Best Performance - Notated Composition | Won | |
