= Andrew Macleod (musician) =

Australian piccolo player

- Origin: Australia
- Genres: Classical
- Occupation: Instrumentalist
- Instrument: Piccolo

Andrew Macleod is an Australian piccolo player. He is the Principal Piccolo of the Melbourne Symphony Orchestra. Together with the Melbourne Symphony Orchestra, Benjamin Northey and Markus Stenz, Macleod was nominated for the 2014 ARIA Award for Best Classical Album for the album Ades Polaris / Stanhope Piccolo Concerto.

== Discography ==
=== Albums ===
List of albums, with selected details
Title	Details
Ades Polaris / Stanhope Piccolo Concerto (with Melbourne Symphony Orchestra, Benjamin Northey & Markus Stenz)	Released: 2014; Format: CD, Digital; Label: ABC Classics

== Awards and nominations ==
=== ARIA Music Awards ===
The ARIA Music Awards are presented annually from 1987 by the Australian Recording Industry Association (ARIA).

Year	Nominee / work	Award	Result	Ref.
2014	Ades Polaris / Stanhope Piccolo Concerto (with Melbourne Symphony Orchestra, Benjamin Northey, Markus Stenz)	Best Classical Album	Nominated	
