= Markus Stenz =

German conductor (born 1965)

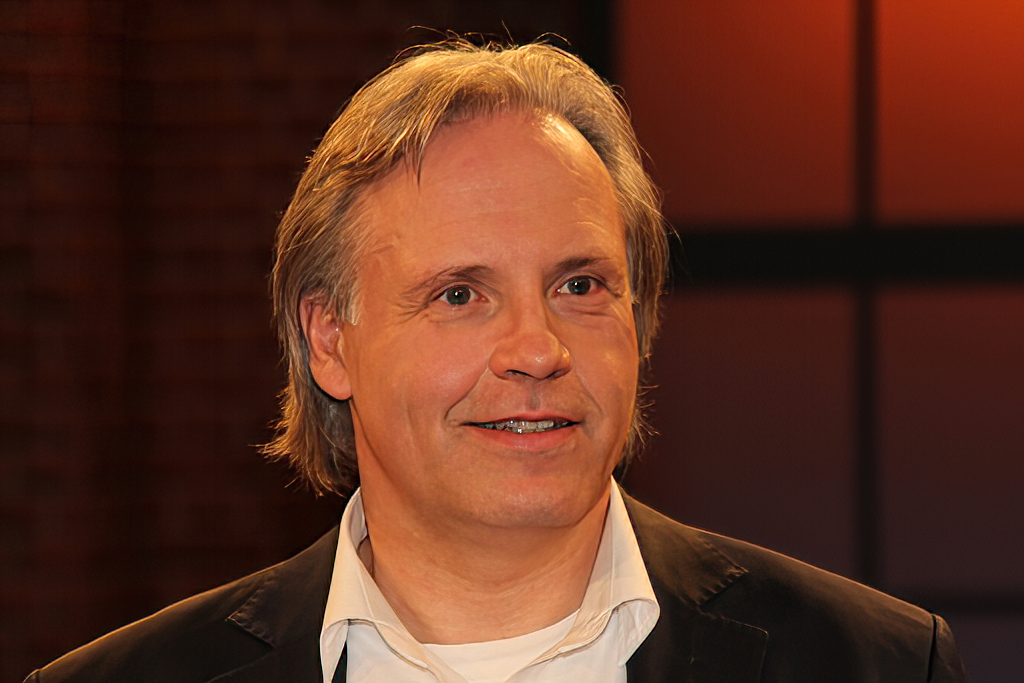
Markus Stenz, 2012

Markus Stenz (born 28 February 1965, Bad Neuenahr-Ahrweiler, Rhineland-Palatinate) is a German conductor. He studied at the Hochschule für Musik Köln with Volker Wangenhein and at Tanglewood with Leonard Bernstein and Seiji Ozawa.

Stenz has served as Artistic Director of the Montepulciano Festival (1989–1995), and Principal Conductor of the London Sinfonietta (1994–1998). In Australia, from 1998 to 2004, he was Artistic Director and Chief Conductor of the Melbourne Symphony Orchestra (MSO), which he took on their first European tour in 2000. Stenz is known for his championing of contemporary composers, which included the appointment of Brett Dean as the MSO's composer-in-residence in 2001.

Stenz was Principal Conductor of the Gürzenich Orchestra (Gürzenich-Kapellmeister) from 2003 to 2014. During his tenure, beginning in October 2005, concerts of the Gürzenich Orchestra have been recorded live on their own label "GO live!" and made available within 5 minutes of the end of the concert the same night for purchase by audience members. Stenz conducted the Gürzenich Orchestra's first concert appearance at The Proms in August 2008.

In February 2008, Stenz was named principal guest conductor of the Hallé Orchestra, the second principal guest conductor in the orchestra's history. He held this post from 2009 to 2014. In August 2010, the Radio Filharmonisch Orkest (RFO) announced the appointment of Stenz as its eighth chief conductor, effective with the 2012–2013 season, with an initial contract of 3 years. Stenz concluded his RFO chief conductorship as of the close of the 2018–2019 season. In July 2014, the Baltimore Symphony Orchestra announced the appointment of Stenz as its next principal guest conductor, as of the 2015–2016 season, with an initial contract of 3 years. In September 2016, Stenz was appointed as conductor-in-residence of the Seoul Philharmonic Orchestra, effective January 2017, with a contract of 3 years.

Stenz is noted as a conductor of the operas of Hans Werner Henze. His conducting debut at the La Fenice theatre in Venice was with a production of Henze's Elegy for Young Lovers. Stenz has also led the premieres of other Henze operas, including Das verratene Meer (Deutsche Oper, Berlin), Venus und Adonis (Bavarian State Opera, Munich) and L'Upupa und der Triumph der Sohnesliebe (2003 Salzburg Festival).

Stenz is a Fellow of the Royal Northern College of Music.

== Discography ==
In addition to his recordings with the Gürzenich Orchestra, Stenz made his first recording with the Royal Concertgebouw Orchestra in premieres of works by Moritz Eggert, Colin Matthews, Theo Verbey and Detlev Glanert. Further recordings include Helmut Lachenmann's Ausklang and Strauss' An Alpine Symphony with the Ensemble Modern Orchestra, Karl Amadeus Hartmann's Simplicius Simplicissimus, and Henze's Symphony No. 8 and other pieces with the Gürzenich Orchestra. Stenz and the Gürzenich Orchestra have recorded a series of the music of Gustav Mahler for Oehms Classics, and recordings of Richard Strauss and Arnold Schoenberg for Hyperion Records.

== Awards and nominations ==
=== ARIA Music Awards ===
The ARIA Music Awards are presented annually from 1987 by the Australian Recording Industry Association (ARIA).

Year	Nominee / work	Award	Result	Ref.
2014	Ades Polaris / Stanhope Piccolo Concerto (with Andrew Macleod, Melbourne Symphony Orchestra & Benjamin Northey)	Best Classical Album	Nominated	

Cultural offices
Preceded by Paul Crossley	Music Director, London Sinfonietta; 1994–1998	Succeeded by Oliver Knussen
Preceded by James Conlon	Chief Conductor, Gürzenich Orchester; 2003–2014	Succeeded by François-Xavier Roth
Preceded by Jaap van Zweden	Chief Conductor, Radio Filharmonisch Orkest; 2012–2019	Succeeded by Karina Canellakis
