= National Live Music Awards =

Australian music awards

- Current: National Live Music Awards of 2020
- Country: Australia
- First award: 2016; 10 years ago
- Final award: Current
- Website: www.nlmas.com.au

The National Live Music Awards (NLMAs) are annual Australian music awards, established by Heath Media in 2016. They were preceded by the AU Live Music Awards in the previous two years. The awards are given in categories that recognise the best live music venues, performers, events, and festivals. The awards contain both national and state-focused categories, voted on by people in the live industry, with select public-voted categories.

== History ==
The National Live Music Awards were preceded by the AU Live Music Awards, held in 2014 and 2015 and run by event director Larry Heath under the auspices of Heath Media. They were the first awards dedicated solely to contemporary live music in Australia.

=== NLMA events ===
At the inaugural edition of the National Live Music Awards that took place on 29 November 2016, there were eight live award shows, one held in each capital city, across every state and territory, awarding the regional winners, while at the gala show in Sydney, the nationwide winners were announced.

The second event was held on 7 December 2017. Sydney band Gang of Youths won four awards at the event, while Melbourne group Camp Cope won three.

The third annual event was held on 6 December 2018, with a new award to recognise live music photographers and the introduction of "The Sheddy", the new name of the Live Drummer award in memory of the late Iain Shedden, who was one of the award's judges in its inaugural year. Magic Dirt were the recipients of the inaugural Live Legends Hall of Fame Induction.

In 2019 the NLMAs were held in Canberra as well as Brisbane, Sydney, Melbourne, Adelaide, Launceston, Alice Springs, and Fremantle, and the categories were expanded to include jazz and classical music. The fourth annual event was held on 4 December 2019 and saw Electric Fields take home three awards, including two of the biggest of the night, Live Act of the Year and Live Voice of the Year. Deborah Conway was inducted into the Live Legends Hall of Fame.

The fifth annual event occurred on 20 October 2020.

The 2021 and 2022 events were cancelled due to the COVID-19 pandemic in Australia. In December 2022, it was confirmed that they would be back to celebrate the live sector in October 2023, after the two-year hiatus.

== Description ==
The National Live Music Awards are awarded in categories that recognise the best live music venues, performers, events, and festivals. The awards contain both national and state-focused categories, voted on by people in the live industry (including fellow musicians, media, venues, bookers), with select public-voted categories. The national awards are revealed at a gala event, while the state and territory awards are revealed at satellite events in their respective capital cities.

The awards are open to any musician or band that played a concert in Australia between 1 September and 31 August of any year. Music venues which have been active during this period and music festivals that have taken place between these dates are eligible for their respective awards.

As of 2023 Heath continues to serves a director of the awards.

== Awards by year ==
To see the full article for a particular year, please click on the year link.

National Live Music Awards
Year	Live Act of the Year	Live Voice of the Year	Best New Act	Live Legend	Ref.
2016	The Smith Street Band	Ngaiire	Camp Cope	—N/a	
2017	Gang of Youths	David Le'aupepe (Gang of Youths)	Amy Shark	—N/a	
2018	Baker Boy	Stella Donnelly	Tropical Fuck Storm	Magic Dirt	
2019	Electric Fields	Zaachariaha Fielding (Electric Fields)	Tones and I	Deborah Conway	
2020	Sampa The Great	Zaachariaha Fielding (Electric Fields)	—N/a	—N/a	
2021	Cancelled due to the COVID-19 pandemic				
2022	Cancelled due to the COVID-19 pandemic				
2023	Amyl and the Sniffers	Zaachariaha Fielding (Electric Fields)	—N/a	Yothu Yindi and Susan Heymann	

== See also ==
- Iain Shedden
