= One Milkali (One Blood) =

2024 song by Electric Fields

Single by Electric Fields
- Written: 2019
- Released: 5 March 2024
- Length: 2:57
- Label: Sony
- Songwriters: Michael Ross; Zaachariaha Fielding
- Producers: Luke Million; Michael Ross; Zaachariaha Fielding

Electric Fields singles chronology
"Anpuru Maau Kutjpa" (2023)	"One Milkali (One Blood)" (2024)	"Dream On" (2024)

Lyric video
- "One Milkali (One Blood)" on YouTube

Eurovision Song Contest 2024 entry
- Country: Australia
- Artist: Electric Fields
- Languages: English, Yankunytjatjara

Finals performance
- Semi-final result: 11th
- Semi-final points: 41

Entry chronology
- ◄ "Promise" (2023)
- "Milkshake Man" (2025) ►

Official performance video
- "One Milkali (One Blood)" (first semi-final) on YouTube

"One Milkali (One Blood)" is a song by Australian synth pop duo Electric Fields. It was written by both members of the duo, and has lyrics in English and Yankunytjatjara, an Aboriginal Australian language. It was released on 5 March 2024 through Sony Music Australia. The song represented Australia in the Eurovision Song Contest 2024, and finished in 11th place with 41 points at semi final one.

The song was nominated for Song of the Year at the National Indigenous Music Awards 2024.

== Background and composition ==
"One Milkali (One Blood)" was written by the members of Electric Fields, Michael Ross and Zaachariaha Fielding. The song is written in English, but has lines in the Yankunytjatjara language. According to Fielding, Yankunytjatjara was added as a way to honour his community in Mimili in Aṉangu Pitjantjatjara Yankunytjatjara, also known as APY. (Note: APY is a large area in the northern desert region of South Australia reserved for and governed by Aboriginal people, established in 1981.) It was written in 2019 as a potential song when the duo competed in Eurovision – Australia Decides that year. The song was originally inspired by an Aboriginal Australian painting that Robert Fielding, Zaachariaha's father, had made titled Milkali Kutju, which symbolizes non-indigenous Australians and Aboriginal Australians working together.

In a press release given out by SBS, the duo stated that the song's title referred to the song's message of advocated for togetherness. They praised Aboriginal Australian culture, stating, "Aboriginal culture has a way of dealing with situations... You don't have to jump on anybody to get what you want. You can actually dialogue it out." An analysis written by Sebastian Diaz of Wiwibloggs that addressed the mathematical references of the inverse of the golden ratio base, which is used to maintain balance, claimed that it was put in to address "how both significant and insignificant we are in the world", advocating all members of society to come together as a singular entity for the greater good. Ross also has stated desires for the song being used as "a tool to heal" in light of the Gaza war.

== Critical reception ==
In a Wiwibloggs review containing several reviews from several critics, the song was rated 6.37 out of 10 points. Vulture's Jon O'Brien ranked the song 25th overall, opining that "its muted house-pop sound may struggle to make itself heard in a year that has completely eschewed the idea that less is more".

== Eurovision Song Contest ==
=== Internal selection ===
Australia's broadcaster for the Eurovision Song Contest, the Special Broadcasting Service (SBS), officially confirmed participation in the Eurovision Song Contest 2024 on 5 December 2023. On 15 February 2024, SBS announced that it had internally chosen its song and participant to select their representative for that year's contest. A snippet of the song was released two days before its official release in to promote the country's entry. On 5 March, "One Milkali (One Blood)" was officially announced as Australia's song for the contest.

=== At Eurovision ===
The Eurovision Song Contest 2024 took place at the Malmö Arena in Malmö, Sweden, and consisted of two semi-finals held on the respective dates of 7 and 9 May and the final on 11 May 2024. During the allocation draw on 30 January 2024, Australia was drawn to compete in the first semi-final, performing in the second half of the show. The duo were later drawn to perform 13th in the semi-final, after Azerbaijan's duo of Fahree and Ilkin Dovlatov and before Portugal's Iolanda. The duo used Zaachariaha's previous artwork as part of the staging at Eurovision. They failed to qualify for the final.

== Track listing ==
Digital download/streaming

1. "One Milkali (One Blood)" – 2:56

Digital download/streaming – Tseba remix

1. "One Milkali (One Blood)" (Tseba remix) – 3:25

Digital download/streaming – Motez remix

1. "One Milkali (One Blood)" (Motez remix) – 5:07

== Release history ==
Release history and formats for "One Milkali (One Blood)"
Country	Date	Format(s)	Version	Label	Ref.
Various	5 March 2024	Digital download; streaming	Single	Sony Music Australia	
Various	3 May 2024	Digital download; streaming	Tseba remix	Sony Music Australia	
Various	10 May 2024	Digital download; streaming	Motez remix	Sony Music Australia	
