= Promise (Voyager song) =

2023 song by Voyager

Single by Voyager

from the album Fearless in Love
- Released: 21 February 2023
- Genre: Progressive metal
- Length: 3:03
- Label: Season of Mist
- Songwriters: Alex Canion; Ashley Doodkorte; Daniel Estrin; Scott Kay; Simone Dow
- Producers: Voyager; Matt Templeman; Paul Clarke

Voyager singles chronology
"Submarine" (2022)	"Promise" (2023)	"Prince of Fire" (2023)

Music video
- "Promise" on YouTube

Eurovision Song Contest 2023 entry
- Country: Australia
- Artist: Voyager
- Language: English
- Composers: Alex Canion; Ashley Doodkorte; Daniel Estrin; Scott Kay; Simone Dow
- Lyricist: Daniel Estrin

Finals performance
- Semi-final result: 1st
- Semi-final points: 149
- Final result: 9th
- Final points: 151

Entry chronology
- ◄ "Not the Same" (2022)
- "One Milkali (One Blood)" (2024) ►

Official performance videos
- "Promise" (second semi-final) on YouTube "Promise" (grand final) on YouTube

"Promise" is a song by Australian progressive metal band Voyager, released on 21 February 2023. The song represented Australia in the Eurovision Song Contest 2023 after the band was internally selected by the Special Broadcasting Service (SBS), Australia's broadcaster for the Eurovision Song Contest. It was included on the band's eighth studio album, Fearless in Love. The song entered the charts in Australia, UK, Finland, Iceland, Lithuania and Sweden.

At the APRA Music Awards of 2024, the song was shortlisted for Song of the Year.

== Eurovision Song Contest ==
=== Internal selection ===
On 14 November 2022, the Special Broadcasting Service (SBS) announced that it would internally select the Australian entry for the Eurovision Song Contest 2023, foregoing the Eurovision – Australia Decides selection show the broadcaster had organised since 2019.

On 20 February 2023, SBS prepared a premiere for the official release of the song and the music video the following day, along with the artist reveal, which was later confirmed to be Voyager with "Promise".

=== At Eurovision ===
According to Eurovision rules, all nations with the exceptions of the host country and the "Big Five" (France, Germany, Italy, Spain and the United Kingdom) are required to qualify from one of two semi-finals in order to compete for the final; the top ten countries from each semi-final progress to the final. The European Broadcasting Union (EBU) split up the competing countries into six different pots based on voting patterns from previous contests, with countries with favourable voting histories put into the same pot. On 31 January 2023, an allocation draw was held, which placed each country into one of the two semi-finals, and determined which half of the show they would perform in. Australia was placed into the second semi-final, held on 11 May 2023, and performed in the second half of the show. Australia won the second semi-final with 149 points, advancing to the grand final.

== Track listing ==
Digital download
No.	Title	Length
1.	"Promise"	3:03

Digital download (2nd version)
No.	Title	Length
1.	"Promise" (Instrumental)	3:03
2.	"Promise"	3:03

Digital download (3rd version)
No.	Title	Length
1.	"Promise" (House Remix)	3:03
2.	"Promise" (Instrumental)	3:03
3.	"Promise"	3:03

7" (Europe)
No.	Title	Length
1.	"Promise"	3:03
2.	"Dreamer"	2:57

Digital download (4th version)
No.	Title	Length
1.	"Promise" (Electric String Version)	3:03

Digital download
No.	Title	Length
1.	"Promise" (Neurotech Remix)	3:46

== Personnel ==
Voyager

- Alex Canion – bass, vocals
- Ashley Doodkorte – drums
- Simone Dow – guitar
- Danny Estrin – keyboards, lead vocals
- Scott Kay – guitar

Technical

- Voyager – co-production
- Matthew Templeman – co-production, recording, mixing
- Paul Clarke – co-production
- Danny Estrin – keyboards recording
- Simon Struthers – mastering
- Ashley Doodkorte – artwork, layout

== Charts ==
Chart performance for "Promise"
Chart (2023)	Peak position
Australia Digital Tracks (ARIA)	8
Australia Independent (AIR)	1
Finland (Suomen virallinen lista)	47
Iceland (Tónlistinn)	24
Lithuania (AGATA)	28
Sweden Heatseeker (Sverigetopplistan)	7
UK Singles (OCC)	79
UK Indie (OCC)	25
UK Rock & Metal (OCC)	7
