= 2000 and Whatever =

Single by Electric Fields
- Released: 1 February 2019
- Recorded: 2018
- Length: 2:52
- Label: Electric Fields
- Songwriters: Michael Ross; Zaachariaha Fielding

Electric Fields singles chronology
"No Other High" (2017)	"2000 and Whatever" (2019)	"Would I Lie" (2020)

"2000 and Whatever" is a song written and recorded by Australian electronic music duo, Electric Fields, released in February 2019 as the duo's debut single. The song was an entry in the 2019 Eurovision - Australia Decides; placing second. The song peaked at number 38 on the Australian Digital Tracks.

In a statement, the duo said the inspiration behind the track is the belief that "this generation could be the best yet" saying "We can do this by becoming aware that we are all here, together, for reasons we'll never fully grasp. There’s room for everybody... So use those thoughts to navigate a path to a new level of freedom. Because in no time we'll all be dead."

In July 2019, "2000 and Whatever" was nominations for Song of the Year at the National Indigenous Music Awards.

The song was chosen to represent Australia at the OGAE Second Chance Contest, where it placed fourth.

== Background ==
On 2 December 2018, Electric Fields were amongst the first set of four names announced to compete in the first Australian national final to select representative for Australia at the Eurovision Song Contest 2019.

The duo said "The Eurovision Song Contest is the Olympics of camp! It's a flamboyant spectacle and we're excited to be part of the first ever Eurovision selection show on home soil. We want to tell a story on stage with fierce energy that will hopefully shoot through the cameras and out of the TV screens at home." The song was released on 1 February 2019.

On 9 February 2019, the song placed second with both jury and televote and placed second overall.

== Critical reception ==
auspOp reviewed the track, saying "We're really digging this edgy dance/pop number... with savage vocals, splashes of Pitjantjatjara [and] Yankunytjatjara language, little stylistic flourishes... we seriously think this could win the whole thing. Douze points."

Jackson Langford from Music Feeds called the song "electro-pop goodness".

Walter Marsh said "'2000 and Whatever' also looked to be a perfect choice for Eurovision, from its pulsating electronic beat and big, pitch shifting pop chorus to its theme of millennial empowerment."

== Charts ==
Chart (2019)	Peak position
Australian Digital Tracks (ARIA)	38

== Release history ==
Region	Release date	Format	Label
Australia	1 February 2019	Digital download, streaming	Electric Fields
