= Croatia in the Eurovision Song Contest 2005 =

- Eurovision Song Contest 2005
- Participating broadcaster: Hrvatska radiotelevizija (HRT)
- Country: Croatia
- Selection process: Dora 2005
- Selection date: 5 March 2005

Competing entry
- Song: "Vukovi umiru sami"
- Artist: Boris Novković
- Songwriters: Franjo Valentić; Boris Novković

Placement
- Semi-final result: Qualified (4th, 169 points)
- Final result: 11th, 115 points

Participation chronology

Croatia was represented at the Eurovision Song Contest 2005 with the song "Vukovi umiru sami", composed by Franjo Valentić, with lyrics by Boris Novković, and performed by Novković himself featuring Lado Members. The Croatian participating broadcaster, Hrvatska radiotelevizija (HRT), organised the national final Dora 2005 to select its entry for the contest. Twenty entries competed in the national final which consisted of three stages: a quarter-final, two semi-finals and a final. Eighteen entries qualified from the quarter-final between 21 and 24 February 2004, and seven entries qualified from each semi-final on 3 and 4 March 2005 to compete in the final on 5 March 2005. In the final, the winner was selected over two rounds of voting. In the first round, the top three entries advanced to the superfinal following the combination of votes from a seven-member jury panel and a public televote. In the superfinal, "Vukovi umiru sami" performed by Boris Novković featuring Lado Members was selected as the winner based entirely on a public televote.

Croatia competed in the semi-final of the Eurovision Song Contest which took place on 19 May 2005. Performing during the show in position 20, "Vukovi umiru sami" was announced among the top 10 entries of the semi-final and therefore qualified to compete in the final on 21 May. It was later revealed that Croatia placed fourth out of the 25 participating countries in the semi-final with 169 points. In the final, Croatia performed in position 18 and placed eleventh out of the 24 participating countries, scoring 115 points.

== Background ==
Prior to the 2005 Contest, Hrvatska radiotelevizija (HRT) had participated in the Eurovision Song Contest representing Croatia thirteen times since its first entry in 1993. Its best result in the contest was fourth, achieved on two occasions: in 1996 with the song "Sveta ljubav" performed by Maja Blagdan and in 1999 with the song "Marija Magdalena" performed by Doris Dragović. In 2004, "You Are the Only One" performed by "You Are the Only One" managed to qualify to the final, placing 12th.

As part of its duties as participating broadcaster, HRT organises the selection of its entry in the Eurovision Song Contest and broadcasts the event in the country. Since 1993, HRT organised the national final Dora in order to select its entry for the contest, a method that was continued for its 2005 participation.

== Before Eurovision ==
=== Dora 2005 ===
Dora 2005 was the thirteenth edition of the national selection Dora organised by HRT to select its entry for the Eurovision Song Contest 2005. The competition consisted of a quarter-final between 7 and 25 February 2005, two semi-finals on 3 and 4 March 2005 and a final on 5 March 2005, all taking place at the Studio 10 of HRT in Zagreb. The quarter-final was broadcast on HTV2, while the semi-finals and final were broadcast on HTV1. All shows were also broadcast online via the broadcaster's website hrt.hr.

==== Format ====
Twenty songs competed in Dora 2005 which consisted of three stages. The first stage was a quarter-final where twenty songs competed with the top eighteen proceeding in the competition. The second stage was the two semi-finals where nine songs competed in each semi-final and the top seven proceeded to complete the fourteen-song lineup in the final. The results of the quarter-final and semi-finals were determined by public televoting and the votes from a jury panel. The third stage was the final where the winning song was selected over two rounds of voting: the first round selected the top three songs via votes from the public and jury, while the second round (superfinal) determined the winner solely by public televoting. Ties in all stages were decided in favour of the entry that received the most points from the jury. Public voting included options for telephone and SMS voting.

The jury that voted in all three stages consisted of:

- Aleksandar Kostadinov – entertainment editor at HTV
- Josip Guberina – music director of HRT
- Zoran Brajša – music editor at HR
- Nikša Bratoš – musician
- Larisa Lipovac – choreographer
- Nevenka Mikac – representative of Večernji list
- Zrinka Ferina – representative of Extra

===== Competing entries =====
HRT in collaboration with record companies directly invited twenty artists and songs to participate in the competition. The competing entries were announced on 27 January 2005 and among the artists were Olja Dešić of Fiumens (who represented Croatia in 1993 as part of Put), Magazin (which represented Croatia in 1995), Danijela Martinović (who represented Croatia in 1995 –as part of Magazin– and in 1998), Goran Karan (who represented Croatia in 2000) and Vesna Pisarović (who represented Croatia in 2002).

Artist	Song	Songwriter(s)
4 asa	"Ja nemam prava"	Alen Islamović, Rajko Dujmić
Andrea	"Ljudi s mora"	Tonči Huljić, Vjekoslava Huljić
Boris Novković feat. Lado Members	"Vukovi umiru sami"	Franjo Valentić, Boris Novković
Danijela	"Za tebe rođena"	Petar Grašo, Luka Juras
Electro Team	"Ja nisam ta"	Adonis Ćulibrk "Boytronic"
Emina Arapović	"Pa šta"	Jadranka Krištof
Giuliano	"Dobro došla si"	Tomislav Mrduljaš
Goran Karan	"Bijele zastave"	Zrinko Tutić
Ibrica Jusić	"Sutra bit ce prekasno"	Mario Vukelić, Ibrica Jusić, Marko Tomasović
Ivana Kindl	"Tvoja ljubav meni pripada"	Ivana Kindl
Ivana Radovniković	"Ponesi me"	Neven Šverko, Darijo Brzoja, Đuro Zifra
Jacques Houdek	"Nepobjediva"	Jacques Houdek, Boris Đurđević
Luka Nižetić and Klapa Nostalgija	"Proljeće"	Luka Nižetić
Magazin	"Nazaret"	Tonči Huljić, Vjekoslava Huljić
Neno Belan and Fiumens	"Hey"	Neno Belan
Ricardo	"Ni kiwi, ni mango"	Ricardo Luque
Saša, Tin i Kedžo	"Zašto"	Dalibor Paurić, Vedran Paurić, Fayo
Songkillers	"Utjeha"	Željko Banić
Vesna Pisarović	"Probudi mi ljubav"	Vesna Pisarović
Žanamari	"Kako da te volim"	Branimir Mihaljević, Fayo

==== Quarter-final ====
Between 7 and 18 February 2005, the competing artists performed their entries live during the ten-show programme Kome zvoni Dora hosted by Mirko Fodor and Zlatko Turkalj. The eighteen qualifiers for the semi-finals were determined by a 50/50 combination of votes from a seven-member jury panel and a public televote held between 21 and 24 February 2005 and announced during a press conference on 25 February 2005.

Quarter-final – 7–25 February 2005
Presentation date	R/O	Artist	Song	Points	Place
7 February 2005	1	Jacques Houdek	"Nepobjediva"	24	8
7 February 2005	2	Emina Arapović	"Pa šta"	19	12
8 February 2005	3	Danijela	"Za tebe rođena"	32	4
8 February 2005	4	Vesna Pisarović	"Probudi mi ljubav"	9	18
9 February 2005	5	Magazin	"Nazaret"	28	6
9 February 2005	6	Songkillers	"Utjeha"	6	20
10 February 2005	7	Ibrica Jusić	"Sutra bit ce prekasno"	16	13
10 February 2005	8	Andrea	"Ljudi s mora"	30	5
11 February 2005	9	4 asa	"Ja nemam prava"	28	6
11 February 2005	10	Saša, Tin i Kedžo	"Zašto"	20	11
14 February 2005	11	Boris Novković feat. Lado Members	"Vukovi umiru sami"	36	2
14 February 2005	12	Žanamari	"Kako da te volim"	33	3
15 February 2005	13	Electro Team	"Ja nisam ta"	8	19
15 February 2005	14	Goran Karan	"Bijele zastave"	22	10
16 February 2005	15	Ricardo	"Ni kiwi, ni mango"	10	16
16 February 2005	16	Ivana Kindl	"Tvoja ljubav meni pripada"	12	15
17 February 2005	17	Neno Belan and Fiumens	"Hey"	10	16
17 February 2005	18	Ivana Radovniković	"Ponesi me"	24	8
18 February 2005	19	Giuliano	"Dobro došla si"	14	14
18 February 2005	20	Luka Nižetić and Klapa Nostalgija	"Proljeće"	39	1

==== Semi-finals ====
The two semi-finals took place on 3 and 4 March 2005, hosted by Duško Ćurlić and Robert Ferlin with Mirko Fodor and Zlatko Turkalj hosting segments from the green room. The seven qualifiers for the final from each semi-final were determined by a 50/50 combination of votes from a seven-member jury panel and a public televote.

In addition to the performances of the competing entries, dance group "Rhythm of the Dance" performed as the interval act during the first semi-final, while Tony Cetinski (who represented Croatia in 1994), Doris Dragović (who represented Croatia in 1999), Jasna Zlokić, Massimo, Miroslav Škoro, Natali Dizdar, and Petar Grašo performed as the interval acts during the second semi-final.

Semi-final 1 – 3 March 2005
R/O	Artist	Song	Jury	Televote	Total	Place
1	Žanamari	"Kako da te volim"	6	5	11	4
2	Ricardo	"Ni kiwi, ni mango"	2	3	5	8
3	Emina Arapović	"Pa šta"	3	4	7	7
4	Ibrica Jusić	"Sutra bit ce prekasno"	5	2	7	6
5	Danijela	"Za tebe rođena"	8	7	15	2
6	Saša, Tin i Kedžo	"Zašto"	4	6	10	5
7	Neno Belan and Fiumens	"Hey"	1	1	2	9
8	Andrea	"Ljudi s mora"	7	8	15	3
9	Boris Novković feat. Lado Members	"Vukovi umiru sami"	9	9	18	1

Semi-final 2 – 4 March 2005
R/O	Artist	Song	Jury	Televote	Total	Place
1	Vesna Pisarović	"Probudi mi ljubav"	4	4	8	6
2	Goran Karan	"Bijele zastave"	6	3	9	5
3	Ivana Kindl	"Tvoja ljubav meni pripada"	1	1	2	9
4	4 asa	"Ja nemam prava"	2	6	8	7
5	Giuliano	"Dobro došla si"	3	2	5	8
6	Ivana Radovniković	"Ponesi me"	5	8	13	4
7	Jacques Houdek	"Nepobjediva"	8	5	13	3
8	Magazin	"Nazaret"	9	7	15	1
9	Luka Nižetić and Klapa Nostalgija	"Proljeće"	7	9	15	2

==== Final ====
The final took place on 5 March 2005, hosted by Duško Ćurlić and Robert Ferlin with Mirko Fodor and Zlatko Turkalj hosting segments from the green room. The winner was selected over two rounds of voting. In the first round, a 50/50 combination of votes from a seven-member jury panel and a public televote selected the top three entries to proceed to the second round, the superfinal. In the superfinal, the winner, "Vukovi umiru sami" performed by Boris Novković featuring Lado Members, was determined exclusively by a public televote. In addition to the performances of the competing entries, Björn Again and Ivan Mikulić (who represented Croatia in 2004) performed as the interval acts during the show.

Final – 5 March 2005
R/O	Artist	Song	Jury	Televote	Total	Place
1	Ibrica Jusić	"Sutra bit ce prekasno"	9	1	10	12
2	Emina Arapović	"Pa šta"	3	3	6	13
3	Žanamari	"Kako da te volim"	8	4	12	9
4	Vesna Pisarović	"Probudi mi ljubav"	2	2	4	14
5	4 asa	"Ja nemam prava"	1	10	11	11
6	Ivana Radovniković	"Ponesi me"	5	11	16	7
7	Jacques Houdek	"Nepobjediva"	12	6	18	4
8	Andrea	"Ljudi s mora"	10	8	18	5
9	Goran Karan	"Bijele zastave"	7	7	14	8
10	Saša, Tin i Kedžo	"Zašto"	6	5	11	10
11	Danijela	"Za tebe rođena"	11	9	20	3
12	Luka Nižetić and Klapa Nostalgija	"Proljeće"	4	13	17	6
13	Boris Novković feat. Lado Members	"Vukovi umiru sami"	13	14	27	1
14	Magazin	"Nazaret"	14	12	26	2

Superfinal – 5 March 2005
R/O	Artist	Song	Televote	Place
1	Danijela	"Za tebe rođena"	8,424	3
2	Boris Novković feat. Lado Members	"Vukovi umiru sami"	42,815	1
3	Magazin	"Nazaret"	18,141	2

== At Eurovision ==
According to Eurovision rules, all nations with the exceptions of the host country, the "Big Four" (France, Germany, Spain and the United Kingdom), and the ten highest placed finishers in the 2004 contest are required to qualify from the semi-final on 19 May 2005 in order to compete for the final on 21 May 2005; the top ten countries from the semi-final progress to the final. On 22 March 2005, a special allocation draw was held which determined the running order for the semi-final and Croatia was set to perform in position 20, following the entry from Switzerland and before the entry from Bulgaria. At the end of the show, Croatia was announced as having finished in the top 10 and subsequently qualifying for the grand final. It was later revealed that Croatia placed fourth in the semi-final, receiving a total of 169 points. The draw for the running order for the final was done by the presenters during the announcement of the ten qualifying countries during the semi-final and Croatia was drawn to perform in position 18, following the entry from Germany and before the entry from Greece. Croatia placed eleventh in the final, scoring 115 points.

Both the semi-final and the final were broadcast in Croatia on HRT. The semi-final featured commentary by Zlatko Turkalj, while the final featured commentary by Duško Ćurlić. HRT appointed Barbara Kolar as its spokesperson to announce the Croatian votes during the final.

=== Voting ===
Below is a breakdown of points awarded to Croatia and awarded by Croatia in the semi-final and grand final of the contest. The nation awarded its 12 points to Macedonia in the semi-final and to Serbia and Montenegro in the final of the contest.

==== Points awarded to Croatia ====
Points awarded to Croatia (Semi-final)
Score	Country
12 points	Austria; Bosnia and Herzegovina; Macedonia; Serbia and Montenegro; Slovenia
10 points	Albania; Germany; Switzerland
8 points	Bulgaria; Hungary
7 points	Ukraine
6 points	Moldova; Romania; Sweden
5 points	Monaco
4 points	Iceland; Latvia; Lithuania; Netherlands; Norway
3 points	Estonia; Poland; Portugal
2 points	Finland
1 point	Belgium; Belarus

Points awarded to Croatia (Final)
Score	Country
12 points	Bosnia and Herzegovina; Slovenia
10 points	Serbia and Montenegro
8 points	Austria; Macedonia; Switzerland; Ukraine
7 points	Hungary; Latvia; Monaco
6 points	Lithuania
5 points	Romania
4 points	
3 points	
2 points	Albania; Bulgaria; Estonia; Germany; Netherlands; Norway; Poland
1 point	Finland; Iceland; Russia

==== Points awarded by Croatia ====
Points awarded by Croatia (Semi-final)
Score	Country
12 points	Macedonia
10 points	Slovenia
8 points	Hungary
7 points	Latvia
6 points	Denmark
5 points	Ireland
4 points	Moldova
3 points	Switzerland
2 points	Poland
1 point	Romania

Points awarded by Croatia (Final)
Score	Country
12 points	Serbia and Montenegro
10 points	Bosnia and Herzegovina
8 points	Macedonia
7 points	Latvia
6 points	Hungary
5 points	Greece
4 points	Malta
3 points	Switzerland
2 points	Albania
1 point	Moldova
