= Ivana Radovniković =

Croatian pop singer (born 1985)

- Born: 15 December 1985 (age 40); Zadar, SR Croatia, SFR Yugoslavia
- Origin: Croatia
- Genres: Pop
- Occupations: Singer; songwriter; voice actress
- Instruments: Vocals; piano
- Years active: 2004–present
- Labels: Croatia Records; Dallas Records

Ivana Radovniković (Croatian pronunciation: [ǐʋana radoʋnǐːkoʋit͡ɕ]; born 15 December 1985 in Zadar, Croatia) is a Croatian pop singer.

== Family life ==
Radovniković is the daughter of Albert, a tennis trainer and physical education professor, and mother Ozana, a professor. She has younger sister called Antonia. Ivana attended Juraj Baraković High School in Zadar, after which she moved to Zagreb to study political science.

== Professional background ==
Ivana received several awards including one for the best vocal interpretation. She has been noted to possess the ability called whistle register, but she does not use this often; she prefers to sing more powerful and mid-range notes.

As a child, Ivana did not really aspire to become a singer, but her life and talent gave her a chance to be one. Her first major role in entertainment came in 2003 when she joined the TV show for new singers. When the show ended, Ivana used her talent and opportunity to sign to a record label: Croatia Records in 2004, for her first album “You’re my angel” (Moj si anđeo) title of her first hit song and video. Although Ivana's debut album was very well received, she was not entirely satisfied with the music and image her management had created for her. She felt she needed more energy in her music than her former balladic sound. The change was noticed when she released a Christmas album on December 10, 2006 called “Traces of Christmas” (Tragovi Božića) with covers of popular hits in English, like "Santa Baby", "Man with the Bag", and "Have Yourself a Merry Little Christmas," which was very well received by critics and the public.

She then recorded the song Samo probaj (literally Just try) which was translated in English as “Dare to love me”. It was influenced by swing music from the 1930s and 40s with jive style. Owing to Eurovision fans, the song had international success in a large number of countries throughout the world. She started recording her third album and publicly announced plans of her next album to have a more swing-jazz-blues sound and energy, both musically and lyrically.

She collaborates mostly with Croatian composers Neven Šverko and Marko Tomasović and with Croatian lyricists Đuro Zifra and Darijo Brzoja.

== Festivals ==
- 2004 - Split Festival - "Moj si andjeo"- winning second place (music: Neven Sverko, lyrics: Djuro Zifra & Darijo Brzoja, arr.: Niksa Bratos);
- 2004 - Zadarfest - "Sad kad nisam jedina"- winning award for the best vocal interpretation(music: Neven Sverko, lyrics: Djuro Zifra & Darijo Brzoja, arr:: Niksa Bratos);
- 2005 - Dora (Croatian Eurosong Entry) - "Ponesi me" (music: Neven Sverko, lyrics: Djuro Zifra & Darijo Brzoja, arr.: Muc Softic).
- 2005 - Split Festival - "Kuda da krenem" (music & lyrics: M. Vlaovic)
- 2005 - Zadarski festival- "Samo tebi"
- 2006 - Split Festival - "Kasno je za sve" (music: Neven Sverko, lyrics: Djuro Zifra & Darijo Brzoja, arr.: Dragomir Herendić)
- 2006 - Internacionalni festival zabavne muzike Bihać 2006 - "Svejedno je" (music: Neven Sverko, lyrics: Djuro Zifra & Darijo Brzoja, arr.: Dragomir Herendić)
- 2006 - Zlatne žice Slavonije-Požega 2006, Večer pjesme i vina - "Rušim navike" (music: Neven Sverko, lyrics: Djuro Zifra & Darijo Brzoja, arr.: Dragomir Herendić)
- 2007 - Dora (Croatian Eurosong Entry) - "Samo probaj" (music: Marko Tomasovic, lyrics: Djuro Zifra & Darijo Brzoja, arr.: Toni Eterovic); WINNER of OGAE CROATIA Second Chance 2007
- 2007 - Dora (Croatian Eurosong entry) - "Dare to love me" ("Samo probaj" - English version) (music: Marko Tomasovic, lyrics: Djuro Zifra & Darijo Brzoja, arr.: Toni Eterovic); WINNER of OGAE CROATIA Second Chance 2007
- 2008 - Dora (Croatian Eurosong entry) - "Kakav tužan kraj" (music: Stjepan Marković, lyrics: Ivana Radovniković, arr.: Lesique)
- 2008 - CMC Festival PULA 2008. - "Cafe" (music: Marko Tomasović, lyrics: Djuro Zifra & Darijo Brzoja, arr.: Lesique)

== Discography ==
=== Studio albums ===
- Moj si anđeo (2005)
- Tragovi Božića (2006)
- Café (2008)
- Dio mene (2014)
- Bajke u pjesmama (2015)

=== Singles ===
Title	Year	Peak chart positions	Album
Title	Year	CRO	Album
"Tako rijetko si tu"	2013	1	Dio mene
