= Marie Ortal Malka =

French singer

Marie Ortal Malka (born 13 November 1978) better known as Ortal or Ortal Malka is a singer, born in Israel of Berber and Andalusian origins. She began singing when she was sixteen. In 2000 Ortal moved to Spain and joined the group Gipsy Sound. Ortal was practically unknown until she was chosen to represent France in the Eurovision Song Contest 2005 when she sang "Chacun Pense à Soi" ("Everyone Thinks of Themselves") at the contest in Kyiv, placing 23rd in a field of 24.

== Discography ==
=== Albums ===
- Bar Mitsvah
- Songs for Bar Mitsvah
- Mazeltov Jewish Songs
- Best Jewish Songs
- Jewish Hits Music
- Mazeltov Jewish Tunes

=== Singles ===
- "Chacun Pense à Soi" (2005)

Featured in

- "Pop Like That" (KNOB feat. Ortal), from their second studio album Let Love Rule

| Preceded by Jonatan Cerrada with À chaque pas | France in the Eurovision Song Contest; 2005 | Succeeded by Virginie Pouchain with Il était temps |
