= Malta in the Eurovision Song Contest 2005 =

- Eurovision Song Contest 2005
- Participating broadcaster: Public Broadcasting Services (PBS)
- Country: Malta
- Selection process: Malta Song for Europe 2005
- Selection date: 19 February 2005

Competing entry
- Song: "Angel"
- Artist: Chiara
- Songwriters: Chiara Siracusa

Placement
- Final result: 2nd, 192 points

Participation chronology

Malta was represented at the Eurovision Song Contest 2005 with the song "Angel" written and performed by Chiara. The Maltese participating broadcaster, Public Broadcasting Services (PBS), selected its entry for the contest through the national final Malta Song for Europe 2005. The competition consisted of a final, held on 19 February 2005, where "Angel" performed by Chiara eventually emerged as the winning entry after gaining the most votes from a public televote with 11,935 votes. Chiara had already represented Malta in 1998.

As one of the ten highest placed finishers in 2004, Malta automatically qualified to compete in the final of the Eurovision Song Contest. Performing during the show in position 3, Malta placed second out of the 24 participating countries with 192 points.

== Background ==
Prior to the 2005 Contest, the Maltese Broadcasting Authority (MBA) until 1975, and the Public Broadcasting Services (PBS) since 1991, had participated in the Eurovision Song Contest representing Malta seventeen times since MBA's first entry in 1971. After competing in 1975, Malta was absent from the contest beginning in 1976. They had, to this point, competed in every contest since returning in 1991. Its best placing in the contest thus far was second, achieved in 2002 with the song "7th Wonder" performed by Ira Losco. In 2004, "On Again... Off Again" performed by Julie and Ludwig qualified to the final and placed 12th.

As part of its duties as participating broadcaster, PBS organises the selection of its entry in the Eurovision Song Contest and broadcasts the event in the country. The broadcaster confirmed its intentions to participate at the 2005 contest on 19 October 2004. The Maltese broadcaster had selected its entry consistently through a national final procedure, a method that was continued for its 2005 participation.

== Before Eurovision ==
=== Malta Song for Europe 2005 ===
The logo of Malta Song for Europe 2005

Malta Song for Europe 2005 was the national final format developed by PBS to select its entry for the Eurovision Song Contest 2005. The competition was held on 19 February 2005 at the Mediterranean Conference Centre in the nation's capital city of Valletta. The show was hosted by Clare Aguis, John Bundy and Moira Delia and broadcast on Television Malta (TVM) as well as on the website di-ve.com.

==== Competing entries ====
Artists and composers were able to submit their entries between 19 October 2004 and 24 November 2004. Songwriters from any nationality were able to submit songs as long as the artist were Maltese or either possess Maltese citizenship or heritage. Artists were able to submit as many songs as they wished, however, they could only compete with a maximum of one in the competition. 186 entries were received by the broadcaster. On 9 December 2005, PBS announced a shortlist of 50 entries that had progressed through the selection process. The twenty-two songs selected to compete in the final were announced on 20 January 2005. Among the selected competing artists was former Maltese Eurovision entrant Chiara who represented Malta in 1998, and Fabrizio Faniello who represented Malta in 2001.

On 19 January 2005, "Once Again", written by Paul Abela and Georgina Abela and to have been performed by Fabrizio Faniello, and "Sail Away", written by Marc Paelinck and to have been performed by Chiara, were withdrawn from the competition and replaced with the songs "The Angels Are Tired" performed by Manuel and "There for You" performed by Leontine and Roger due to both singers having been selected with two songs each.

==== Final ====
The final took place on 19 February 2005. Twenty-two entries competed and the winner was determined solely by a public televote. The show was opened with a guest performance of "On Again... Off Again" performed by the 2004 Maltese Eurovision entrant Julie and Ludwig, while the interval act featured performances by Constantinos Christoforou (who represented Cyprus in 1996, in 2002, and in 2005) performing "Ela Ela", Young Talent Team (who represented Malta in Junior 2004), the Central Academy of Ballet, and the local act Corkskrew. After the results of the public televote were announced, "Angel" performed by Chiara was the winner.

R/O	Artist	Song	Songwriter(s)	Televote	Place
1	Natasha and Charlene	"Love Is the Reason"	Jonas Sahlin, Johan Bejerholm, Deo Grech	1,454	13
2	Eleanor Cassar	"He"	Ralph Siegel, John O'Flynn	2,026	10
3	Fabrizio Faniello	"Don't Tell It"	Georgina Abela, Paul Abela	1,574	12
4	Gunther Chetcuti	"One Life"	Gunther Chetcuti, Glen Vella	1,421	15
5	Aldo Busuttil	"Addio ciao"	Ralph Siegel, John O'Flynn	3,561	5
6	Keith Camilleri	"Sunshine in Your Eyes"	Ralph Siegel, John O'Flynn	4,603	4
7	Ali and Lis	"Don't Stop the Party"	Ralph Siegel, John O'Flynn	2,525	8
8	Louiseann Tate	"Time to Fall in Love Again"	Ralph Siegel, John O'Flynn	1,450	14
9	Olivia Lewis	"Déjà vu"	Gerard James Borg, Philip Vella	11,369	2
10	Rosman Pace	"The Sky's the Limit"	Jordan Milnes, Andrew Moulds	670	20
11	Fiona and Nadine	"Words of Love"	Paul Giordimaina, Fleur Balzan	1,657	11
12	Justine	"Through Your Eyes"	Renato Briffa, Doris Chetcuti	711	19
13	Karen Polidano	"Holding Me Down"	Konrad Pule, John Cassaletto	714	18
14	Leontine and Roger	"There for You"	Georgina Abela, Paul Abela	847	17
15	Romina, Rachel and Neville	"We Can Do Better"	Carm Fenech	654	22
16	The Mics	"It's Up to You"	The Mics	666	21
17	Chiara	"Angel"	Chiara Siracusa	11,935	1
18	Glen Vella	"Appreciate"	Paul Giordimaina, Fleur Balzan	3,358	6
19	Andreana and Christian	"Let's Make a Change"	Wayne Micallef, Richard Micallef	992	16
20	Pamela	"Play On"	Paul Giordimaina, Fleur Balzan	2,232	9
21	J. Anvil	"You"	Augusto Cardinali, John Attard	5,903	3
22	Manuel	"The Angels Are Tired"	Ralph Siegel, John O'Flynn	2,526	7

=== Controversy ===
During Malta Song for Europe 2005, it was revealed that there had been issues calculating the final result as one of the three phone companies failed to turn over their results in time and therefore the show overran. A complaint was also submitted by the Maltese Composers and Singers Union (UKAM) due to an electricity breakdown occurring in several cities in Malta which caused affected viewers to only be able to watch the performances of the final six songs (five of the six songs were placed in the top ten, including the eventual winner Chiara).

== At Eurovision ==
The Eurovision Song Contest 2005 took place at the Palace of Sports in Kyiv, Ukraine and consisted of a semi-final on 19 May and the final of 21 May 2005. According to Eurovision rules, all nations with the exceptions of the host country, the "Big Four" (France, Germany, Spain and the United Kingdom) and the ten highest placed finishers in the 2004 contest are required to qualify from the semi-final in order to compete for the final; the top ten countries from the semi-final progress to the final. As one of the ten highest placed finishers in the 2004 contest, Malta automatically qualified to compete in the final. In addition to their participation in the final, Malta is also required to broadcast and vote in the semi-final. On 22 March 2005, an allocation draw was held which determined the running order and Malta was set to perform in position 3 during the final, following the entry from United Kingdom and before the entry from Romania. Malta placed second in the final, scoring 192 points.

The semi-final and the final were broadcast in Malta on TVM with commentary by Eileen Montesin. PBS appointed Moira Delia as its spokesperson to announce the Maltese votes during the final.

=== Voting ===
Below is a breakdown of points awarded to Malta and awarded by Malta in the semi-final and grand final of the contest. The nation awarded its 12 points to Latvia in the semi-final and to Cyprus in the final of the contest.

==== Points awarded to Malta ====
Points awarded to Malta (Final)
Score	Country
12 points	Russia
10 points	Denmark; Ireland; Israel; Norway; Ukraine; United Kingdom
8 points	Belgium; Finland; Germany; Greece; Turkey
7 points	France; Spain
6 points	Cyprus; Sweden
5 points	Austria; Belarus; Hungary; Latvia; Monaco; Netherlands
4 points	Albania; Croatia; Estonia; Iceland
3 points	Switzerland
2 points	Lithuania; Romania
1 point	Slovenia

==== Points awarded by Malta ====
Points awarded by Malta (Semi-final)
Score	Country
12 points	Latvia
10 points	Romania
8 points	Netherlands
7 points	Belarus
6 points	Israel
5 points	Ireland
4 points	Denmark
3 points	Norway
2 points	Hungary
1 point	Switzerland

Points awarded by Malta (Final)
Score	Country
12 points	Cyprus
10 points	Latvia
8 points	Israel
7 points	Romania
6 points	Greece
5 points	Norway
4 points	United Kingdom
3 points	Denmark
2 points	Moldova
1 point	Switzerland
