= Netherlands in the Eurovision Song Contest 2005 =

- Eurovision Song Contest 2005
- Participating broadcaster: Nederlandse Omroep Stichting (NOS)
- Country: Netherlands
- Selection process: Nationaal Songfestival 2005
- Selection date: 13 February 2005

Competing entry
- Song: "My Impossible Dream"
- Artist: Glennis Grace
- Songwriters: Robert D. Fisher; Bruce Smith

Placement
- Semi-final result: Failed to qualify (14th)

Participation chronology

The Netherlands was represented at the Eurovision Song Contest 2005 with the song "My Impossible Dream", composed by Robert D. Fisher, with lyrics by Bruce Smith, and performed by Glennis Grace. The Dutch participating broadcaster, Nederlandse Omroep Stichting (NOS), organised the national final Nationaal Songfestival 2005 in order to select its entry for the contest. 24 entries competed in the national final which consisted of five shows: four semi-finals and a final. Six entries competed in each semi-final with three advancing: two entries selected based on a public vote and one entry selected by a three-member jury panel. Twelve entries qualified from to compete in the final on 13 February 2005 where "My Impossible Dream" performed by Glennis Grace was selected as the winner following the combination of votes from three jury panels and a public vote.

The Netherlands competed in the semi-final of the Eurovision Song Contest which took place on 19 May 2005. Performing during the show in position 9, "My Impossible Dream" was not announced among top 10 entries of the semi-final and therefore did not qualify to compete in the final. It was later revealed that the Netherlands placed fourteenth out of the 25 participating countries in the semi-final with 53 points.

== Background ==
Prior to the 2005 contest, Nederlandse Televisie Stichting (NTS) until 1969, and Nederlandse Omroep Stichting (NOS) since 1970, had participated in the Eurovision Song Contest representing the Netherlands forty-five times since NTS début in the inaugural contest in 1956. They have won the contest four times: in 1957 with the song "Net als toen" performed by Corry Brokken; in 1959 with the song "'n Beetje" performed by Teddy Scholten; in 1969 as one of four countries to tie for first place with "De troubadour" performed by Lenny Kuhr; and finally in 1975 with "Ding-a-dong" performed by the group Teach-In. The Dutch least successful result has been last place, which they have achieved on four occasions, most recently in the 1968 contest. They has also received nul points on two occasions; in 1962 and 1963.

As part of its duties as participating broadcaster, NOS organises the selection of its entry in the Eurovision Song Contest and broadcasts the event in the country. The Dutch broadcasters has used various methods to select its entry in the past, such as the Nationaal Songfestival, a live televised national final to choose the performer, song or both to compete at Eurovision. However, internal selections have also been held on occasion. Since 2003, NOS in collaboration with Televisie Radio Omroep Stichting (TROS), has organised Nationaal Songfestival in order to select its entry for the contest, a method that was continued for the 2005 entry.

== Before Eurovision ==
=== Nationaal Songfestival 2005 ===
Nationaal Songfestival 2005 was the national final developed by NOS in collaboration with TROS to select its entry for the Eurovision Song Contest 2005. Twenty-four entries competed in the competition consisting of five shows that commenced with the first of four semi-finals on 20 January 2005 and concluded with a final on 13 February 2005. All shows in the competition took place at the Pepsi Stage in Amsterdam, hosted by Nance Coolen and Hans Schiffers and were broadcast on Nederland 2 as well as streamed online via the broadcaster's Eurovision Song Contest website songfestival.nl. The final was also broadcast on Radio 2 with commentary by Hijlco Span.

==== Format ====
The format of the national final consisted of five shows: four semi-finals and a final. The semi-finals each featured six competing entries from which three advanced from each show to complete the twelve-song lineup in the final. The results for the semi-final shows were determined by a three-member expert jury and votes from the public. The songs first faced a public televote where the top two entries qualified, while the jury selected an additional qualifier from the remaining entries. In the final, the winner was selected by the combination of votes from public televoting and three juries. Viewers were able to vote via telephone and SMS.

The expert jury panel that voted in all shows consisted of:

- Cornald Maas – journalist
- Esther Hart – vocal teacher, represented the Netherlands in 2003
- Paul de Leeuw – singer and television personality

==== Competing entries ====
A submission period was opened by the Dutch broadcaster on 2 August 2004 where artists and composers were able to submit their entries until 1 October 2004. 250 submissions were received by the broadcaster at the closing of the deadline, and the twenty-four selected competing entries were announced during a press conference on 17 December 2004. Among the artists were Laura Vlasblom –as part of Airforce– (who represented the Netherlands in 1986 as part of Frizzle Sizzle), and Justine Pelmelay (who represented the Netherlands in 1989). Trinity and No Angels changed their names to Trinity United and We're No Angels before the competition.

Artist	Song	Songwriter(s)
Airforce	"How Does It Feel"	Johnny Logan, Andreas Linze
André Kuik	"So High"	Romeo Samuel
Barbara Lok	"Tranen in de stilte"	Darre van Dijk, Lars Boom
Blue Karma	"Free As a Bird"	Kees Tel
Chantal	"Eat Yer Heart Out, Leonardo!"	Christian Grotenbreg, Bruce Smith
Chastity	"Baby It's You"	Kees Rietveld, Jeroen van Berlo, Wiebe van der Mei
Darre	"De liefde"	Darre van Dijk, Lars Boom
Femme Vocale	"Stay"	Kees Koedooder
Glennis Grace	"My Impossible Dream"	Robert D. Fisher, Bruce Smith
Jeen	"Een leven lang"	M. Rainier Ypma
Johnny Rosenberg	"When Forever Ends"	Alan Michael, Johnny Rosenberg
Justine Pelmelay	"What You See Is What You Get"	Christian Grotenbreg, Bruce Smith
Kuik and Klaver	"Together"	Eddy Hoogland, Kees Hendriks
Meänder	"Tusken skimer en ljocht"	Douwe Bouma, Wiebe van der Mei
Nadeem	"Too Wild"	Linh Duong, Orlando Salarbux, Nadeem Ilahibibaks
Rachel and Waylon	"Leven als een beest"	Mark Groot Kormelink, Peter Groot Kormelink
Ralph McCoy	"Breaking News"	Christian Grotenbreg, Bruce Smith
Renée and Dennis	"One Look"	Renée van Wegberg, Arjan Langen
Tiffany	"Tomorrow"	Tiffany Maes, Harry Maes
Trinity United	"Go!"	Jerry Rijstenbil, Gregor Hamilton
We're No Angels	"Dressed to Kill"	Robert D. Fisher, Bruce Smith
Willemijn Verkaik	"Wishful Thinking"	Paul Mayer, Bram Anker, Bruce Smith
Wilson	"Something"	Dennis Leidelmeyer
Yvette	"Someone Like You"	Robert D. Fisher, Bruce Smith

==== Semi-finals ====
The four semi-finals took place on 20 January, 27 January, 3 February and 10 February 2005. In each semi-final six acts competed and four entries qualified to the final. A public televote first selected the top two entries to advance, while an additional qualifier was selected by a three-member expert jury from the remaining four entries.

Public vote qualifier Jury qualifier

Semi-final 1 – 20 January 2005
R/O	Artist	Song	Televote	Place	Result
1	Trinity United	"Go!"	25%	1	Qualified
2	Renée and Dennis	"One Look"	22%	2	Qualified
3	Wilson	"Something"	17%	3	—N/a
4	Yvette	"Someone Like You"	15%	5	Qualified
5	Jeen	"Een leven lang"	16%	4	—N/a
6	Chantal	"Eat Yer Heart Out, Leonardo!"	6%	6	—N/a

Semi-final 2 – 27 January 2005
R/O	Artist	Song	Televote	Place	Result
1	Rachel and Waylon	"Leven als een beest"	9%	4	—N/a
2	Willemijn Verkaik	"Wishful Thinking"	7%	5	—N/a
3	Tiffany	"Tomorrow"	18%	3	Qualified
4	Blue Karma	"Free As a Bird"	6%	6	—N/a
5	Meänder	"Tusken skimer en ljocht"	41%	1	Qualified
6	Chastity	"Baby It's You"	21%	2	Qualified

Semi-final 3 – 3 February 2005
R/O	Artist	Song	Televote	Place	Result
1	Johnny Rosenberg	"When Forever Ends"	25%	2	Qualified
2	Kuik and Klaver	"Together"	13%	3	—N/a
3	Femme Vocale	"Stay"	9%	4	Qualified
4	Justine Pelmelay	"What You See Is What You Get"	8%	6	—N/a
5	Ralph McCoy	"Breaking News"	9%	5	—N/a
6	Barbara Lok	"Tranen in de stilte"	35%	1	Qualified

Semi-final 4 – 10 February 2005
R/O	Artist	Song	Televote	Place	Result
1	Airforce	"How Does It Feel"	27%	2	Qualified
2	Darre	"De liefde"	4%	5	Qualified
3	We're No Angels	"Dressed to Kill"	3%	6	—N/a
4	Glennis Grace	"My Impossible Dream"	38%	1	Qualified
5	Nadeem	"Too Wild"	6%	4	—N/a
6	André Kuik	"So High"	23%	3	—N/a

==== Final ====
The final took place on 13 February 2005 where the twelve entries that qualified from the preceding four semi-finals competed. The winner, "My Impossible Dream" performed by Glennis Grace, was selected by the 50/50 combination of a public televote and the votes of three juries: a three-member expert jury, a radio jury consisting of ten Radio 2 listeners and an international jury consisting of ten foreign conservatory students. The viewers and the juries each had a total of 290 points to award. Each member of the expert jury and the remaining two jury groups distributed their points as follows: 1, 2, 3, 4, 5, 6, 7, 8, 10 and 12 points. The viewer vote was based on the percentage of votes each song achieved through the following voting methods: telephone and SMS voting. For example, if a song gained 10% of the vote, then that entry would be awarded 10% of 290 points rounded to the nearest integer: 29 points.

In addition to the performances of the competing entries, the show featured guest performances by Jim Bakkum, Johnny Logan (who won Eurovision for Ireland in 1980 and in 1987) and past Dutch Eurovision entrants Mandy Huydts (1986), Maxine and Franklin Brown (1996), Marlayne (1999) and Esther Hart (2003).

Final – 13 February 2005
R/O	Artist	Song	Jury	Televote	Total	Place
1	Trinity United	"Go"	25	7	32	6
2	Renée and Dennis	"One Look"	16	7	23	10
3	Chastity	"Baby It's You"	26	7	33	5
4	Meänder	"Tusken skimer en ljocht"	12	19	31	7
5	Femme Vocale	"Stay"	4	6	10	12
6	Barbara Lok	"Tranen in de stilte"	19	6	25	9
7	Yvette	"Someone Like You"	9	5	14	11
8	Johnny Rosenberg	"When Forever Ends"	31	16	47	3
9	Glennis Grace	"My Impossible Dream"	56	114	170	1
10	Darre	"De liefde"	22	6	28	8
11	Tiffany	"Tomorrow"	25	9	34	4
12	Airforce	"How Does It Feel?"	45	88	133	2

Detailed Jury Votes
R/O	Song	Expert Jury			Radio Jury	International Jury	Total
R/O	Song	C. Maas	E. Hart	P. de Leeuw	Radio Jury	International Jury	Total
1	"Go"	4	3		8	10	25
2	"One Look"	2	4	4	6		16
3	"Baby It's You"	8	5	5	4	4	26
4	"Tusken skimer en ljocht"	3	1	7		1	12
5	"Stay"			1	1	2	4
6	"Tranen in de stilte"	1	7	2	3	6	19
7	"Someone Like You"		2			7	9
8	"When Forever Ends"	7	8	6	7	3	31
9	"My Impossible Dream"	12	12	12	12	8	56
10	"De liefde"	6	6	8	2		22
11	"Tomorrow"	5		3	5	12	25
12	"How Does It Feel?"	10	10	10	10	5	45

==== Ratings ====
Viewing figures by show
Show	Date	Viewing figures		Ref.
Show	Date	Nominal	Share	Ref.
Final	13 February 2005	1,497,000	20.8%	

== At Eurovision ==
According to Eurovision rules, all nations with the exceptions of the host country, the "Big Four" (France, Germany, Spain and the United Kingdom) and the ten highest placed finishers in the 2004 contest are required to qualify from the semi-final on 19 May 2005 in order to compete for the final on 21 May 2005; the top ten countries from the semi-final progress to the final. On 22 March 2005, a special allocation draw was held which determined the running order for the semi-final and the Netherlands was set to perform in position 10, following the entry from Belarus and before the entry from Iceland. At the end of the semi-final, the Netherlands was not announced among the top 10 entries in the semi-final and therefore failed to qualify to compete in the final. It was later revealed that Netherlands placed fourteenth in the semi-final, receiving a total of 53 points.

The semi-final and the final was broadcast in the Netherlands on Nederland 2 with commentary by Willem van Beusekom and Cornald Maas as well as via radio on Radio 3FM with commentary by Hijlco Span and Ron Stoeltie. NOS appointed Nance Coolen as its spokesperson to announce the Dutch votes during the final.

=== Voting ===
Below is a breakdown of points awarded to the Netherlands and awarded by the Netherlands in the semi-final and grand final of the contest. The nation awarded its 12 points to Denmark in the semi-final and to Turkey in the final of the contest.

==== Points awarded to the Netherlands ====
Points awarded to the Netherlands (Semi-final)
Score	Country
12 points	Belgium
10 points	
8 points	Malta; Monaco
7 points	
6 points	Denmark
5 points	Andorra; Israel
4 points	Ireland
3 points	
2 points	Switzerland; United Kingdom
1 point	Romania

==== Points awarded by the Netherlands ====
Points awarded by the Netherlands (Semi-final)
Score	Country
12 points	Denmark
10 points	Israel
8 points	Romania
7 points	Andorra
6 points	Belgium
5 points	Poland
4 points	Croatia
3 points	Macedonia
2 points	Norway
1 point	Finland

Points awarded by the Netherlands (Final)
Score	Country
12 points	Turkey
10 points	Greece
8 points	Denmark
7 points	Israel
6 points	Bosnia and Herzegovina
5 points	Malta
4 points	Serbia and Montenegro
3 points	Romania
2 points	Croatia
1 point	Norway
