= Romania in the Eurovision Song Contest 2005 =

- Eurovision Song Contest 2005
- Participating broadcaster: Televiziunea Română (TVR)
- Country: Romania
- Selection process: Selecția Națională 2005
- Selection date: 5 March 2005

Competing entry
- Song: "Let Me Try"
- Artist: Luminiţa Anghel and Sistem
- Songwriters: Cristian Faur

Placement
- Semi-final result: Qualified (1st, 235 points)
- Final result: 3rd, 158 points

Participation chronology

Romania was represented at the Eurovision Song Contest 2005 with the song "Let Me Try", written by Cristian Faur, and performed by Luminița Anghel and Sistem. The Romanian participating broadcaster, Televiziunea Română (TVR), organised the national final Selecția Națională 2005 in order to select its entry for the contest. Controversy surrounded the national final, as runner-up Loredana accused TVR of vote rigging.

Prior to Eurovision, "Let Me Try" was promoted by a music video and coverage in press, among other endeavours by TVR. Romania reached first place in the contest's semi-final with 235 points. This resulted in its qualification for the Grand Final, where it achieved third place with 158 points. This remains the country's best result in the contest, alongside its 2010 entry and the 2026 entry. During Romania's show, Anghel performed to the song in front of Sistem, who contributed to the track's instrumentation by drumming on oil barrels and using side cutters and a grinding wheel. Following Eurovision, "Let Me Try" achieved commercial success in Romania, peaking at number nine on the Romanian Top 100. In addition, Anghel's participation in the contest led to record deal proposals from various countries including the Netherlands, Hungary, Germany, and England.

== Background ==
Prior to the 2005 contest, Televiziunea Română (TVR) had participated in the Eurovision Song Contest representing Romania seven times since its first entry in 1994. Its highest placing in the contest, to this point, had been ninth place, achieved in 2002 with the song "Tell Me Why" performed by Monica Anghel and Marcel Pavel. In 2004, they placed 18th in the final.

== Before Eurovision ==
=== Selecția Națională 2005 ===
TVR organised Selecția Națională 2005 to select its entry for the Eurovision Song Contest 2005.

==== Competing entries ====
Out of all submitted songs, a jury panel decided on twelve finalists; the music videos to their entries were broadcast on 4 March during TVR's Stele de... Eurovision programme hosted by Mihăluș and Mugurel Vrabete.

Artist	Song	Songwriter(s)
Academica	"Heading for Glory"	Mircea Romcescu
Centru' Civic	"Living for Today"	Andreea Andrei; Centru' Civic
De la Vegas	"Zi și noapte"	Daniel Robu; Silvia Launeanu
Juke Box	"Lonely in Heaven"	Juke Box
June	"Come Into My Life"	Anda Daniela Timbala
Loredana	"Le Le"	Florin Busuioc; Loredana Groza; Mihai Ogasanu
Luminița Anghel and Sistem	"Let Me Try"	Cristian Faur
Mandinga	"Soarele meu"	Laurentiu Duta
Maria Magdalena Dănăilă	"Learn to Say Goodbye"	Maria Magdalena Dănăilă
Nico and Mihai Trăistariu	"All the Time"	Andrei Tudor; Laura de Alvare
Pops	"I Need You So"	Elekes Liviu; Jay
Shake	"You're Right"	George Popa; Irina Gligor

==== Final ====
The final was held on 5 March 2005 at the TVR Studioul 1 from 20:00 to 23:00 EET, it was hosted by Laura Mihăluș and Dan Bittman. In the final, the televoting and jury scores were combined, with the televoting having a 25% weighting of the overall result. The 12-member panel was made up of Horia Moculescu, Titus Munteanu, Daniel Alexandrescu, Crina Mărdare, Oltea Șerban Pârău, Berti Barbera, Vlad Crețu, Adi Despot, Eugen Mihăescu, Dan Manoliu, Andrei Kerestely and Cătalin Tuță Popescu. The three songs attracting the most televotes were "Let Me Try" by Luminița Anghel and Sistem (10,832), "Le Le" by Loredana (3,871) and "All the Time" by Nico and Mihai Trăistariu (3,439). The jury's top two was "Le Le" (135 points) and "Let Me Try" (134 points); the first was awarded the top 12 points mark seven times. Overall, "Let Me Try" won the Selecția Națională with a total of 206 points, followed by "Le Le" (201 points) and "All the Time" (174 points). The full results were:

Final – 5 March 2005
R/O	Artist	Song	Jury	Televote		Total	Place
R/O	Artist	Song	Jury	Votes	Points	Total	Place
1	June	"Come Into My Life"	16	843	42	58	11
2	Nico and Mihai Trăistariu	"All the Time"	114	3,439	60	174	3
3	Maria Magdalena Dănăilă	"Learn to Say Goodbye"	63	728	30	93	8
4	Juke Box	"Lonely in Heaven"	92	628	24	116	6
5	Centru' Civic	"Living for Today"	65	505	18	83	9
6	Shake	"You're Right"	33	379	6	39	12
7	Academica	"Heading for Glory"	69	392	12	81	10
8	Loredana	"Le Le"	135	3,871	66	201	2
9	Luminița Anghel and Sistem	"Let Me Try"	134	10,832	72	206	1
10	De la Vegas	"Zi și noapte"	46	1,394	48	94	7
11	Pops	"I Need You So"	86	747	36	122	5
12	Mandinga	"Soarele meu"	84	2,253	54	138	4

Detailed Jury Votes
R/O	Song	H. Moculescu	T. Munteanu	D. Alexandrescu	C. Mărdare	O. Șerban	B. Barbera	V. Crețu	A. Despot	E. Mihăescu	D. Manoliu	A. Kerestely	C. Tuță	Total
1	"Come Into My Life"	2	3	1	1	1	1	1	1	2	1	1	1	16
2	"All the Time"	11	10	10	10	10	8	7	6	11	10	12	9	114
3	"Learn to Say Goodbye"	1	1	2	6	7	11	6	3	5	6	9	6	63
4	"Lonely in Heaven"	9	8	7	8	8	10	9	5	6	8	4	10	92
5	"Living for Today"	8	6	5	5	4	4	3	8	7	4	6	5	65
6	"You're Right"	3	7	4	3	2	2	2	2	1	2	2	3	33
7	"Heading for Glory"	7	9	6	7	5	6	6	7	8	3	3	2	69
8	"Le Le"	12	12	12	11	12	9	12	12	10	11	10	12	135
9	"Let Me Try"	10	11	11	12	11	12	11	10	12	12	11	11	134
10	"Zi și noapte"	5	2	3	4	3	3	4	4	4	5	5	4	46
11	"I Need You So"	4	5	8	9	9	5	10	11	3	7	8	7	86
12	"Soarele meu"	6	4	9	2	6	7	8	9	9	9	7	8	84

==== Controversy ====
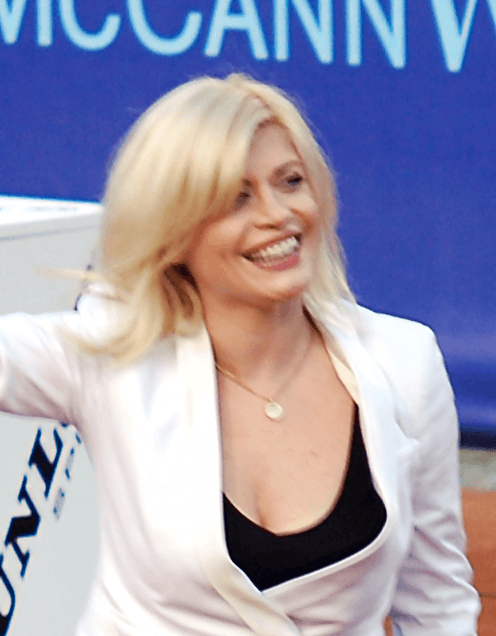
After the winner's announcement, second-placed Loredana (pictured in 2009) accused TVR of conspiracy.

The selection competition saw some controversial events. Nicolae Dinescu, the drummer of the band Juke Box, died on the morning prior to the contest of a heart attack; the group still decided to compete in the contest. Larger controversy came following the winner's announcement, when second-placed Loredana accused TVR of vote rigging. She suggested that this was done because she did not want to sign a contract with the broadcaster that related to the copyright of her song, basing the accusation on reports that her voting line was continuously busy and so people were unable to vote for her when they called. In an editorial for Jurnalul Național, Dana Andronie and Cătălina Iancu agreed with the singer's thoughts, seeing her as the real winner. According to them, the jury votes and the televoting were not added up correctly.

=== Promotion ===
TVR promoted Anghel and Sistem as Romania's entrants for the Eurovision Song Contest with tours abroad and in Romanian communities in Europe. They also had coverage in Romanian diaspora press and on various Romanian and international websites, as well as on radio stations and in European clubs. In addition, TVR sent supporting e-mails to all addresses stored on their server. A music video for "Let Me Try" was released in 2005 and included on an enhanced CD release of the single that year. It features Anghel performing to the song while Sistem drums on barrels in a desert.

== At Eurovision ==
The Eurovision Song Contest 2005 took place at the Palace of Sports in Kyiv, Ukraine and consisted of one semi-final on 19 May, and the final on 21 May 2005. In Romania, the show was aired on TVR, with Dan Manoliu as the country's head of delegation. Anghel and Sistem were scheduled for technical rehearsals on 13 and 15 May. After negotiations, TVR was granted the permission to use flames projected on the background LED screen and a grinding wheel during Romania's performance, although real flames onstage and the use of staves were prohibited. They were, though, allowed to use oil barrels; these had to be brought onstage by special platforms with wheels. Twenty people were needed for the barrel positioning, which occurred in around 40 seconds during set change and cost €3,000.

According to the Eurovision rules at the time, selected countries, except the host country and the "Big Four" (France, Germany, Spain and the United Kingdom), were required to qualify from the semi-final to compete for the final; the top ten countries from the semi-final progressed to the final. In the semi-final, Anghel and Sistem performed 14th, preceded by Norway and followed by Hungary. In the Grand Final, they sang fourth, preceded by Malta and followed by Norway. The show consisted of Anghel performing the song, wearing a green top with a pair of jeans, in front of Sistem, who contributed to the track's instrumentation by "wildly" drumming on oil barrels in a similar way to German industrial band Einstürzende Neubauten. While the singer joined the group during an instrumental part, Sistem also used side cutters and a grinding wheel to create what a Eurovision.de writer described as "spark rain" onstage.

=== Voting ===
Below is a breakdown of points awarded to and by Romania in the semi-final and Grand Final of the contest. In the semi-final, the country finished in first place with a total of 235 points, including ten from Austria, Malta and Portugal, and 12 from Cyprus, Spain, Greece, Hungary, Israel, and Moldova. In the Grand Final, Romania finished in third position, being awarded a total of 158 points, including ten awarded by Hungary and 12 by Spain, Israel and Portugal. This remains the country's best result in the contest, matched in 2010 with their entry "Playing with Fire" by Paula Seling and Ovi and again in 2026 with their entry Choke Me by Alexandra Căpitănescu. Romania awarded its 12 points to Moldova in both the semi-final and Grand Final of the contest. TVR appointed Berti Barbera as its spokesperson to announce the Romanian voting results.

==== Points awarded to Romania ====
Points awarded to Romania (Semi-final)
Score	Country
12 points	Cyprus; Greece; Hungary; Israel; Moldova; Spain
10 points	Austria; Malta; Portugal
8 points	Belgium; Ireland; Netherlands; Poland; United Kingdom
7 points	Denmark; Germany; Monaco; Norway; Turkey
6 points	France
5 points	Bosnia and Herzegovina; Bulgaria; Iceland; Macedonia; Serbia and Montenegro; Sweden
4 points	Andorra; Finland; Switzerland
3 points	Belarus; Russia
2 points	
1 point	Croatia; Estonia; Slovenia; Ukraine

Points awarded to Romania (Final)
Score	Country
12 points	Israel; Portugal; Spain
10 points	Hungary
8 points	Bulgaria; Cyprus
7 points	Andorra; Belgium; Malta; Moldova; Poland
6 points	Austria; Norway
5 points	Albania; France; Greece; Iceland; Ireland
4 points	Monaco; Turkey
3 points	Denmark; Netherlands; Serbia and Montenegro
2 points	Bosnia and Herzegovina; Macedonia; Sweden
1 point	Belarus

==== Points awarded by Romania ====
Points awarded by Romania (Semi-final)
Score	Country
12 points	Moldova
10 points	Hungary
8 points	Israel
7 points	Norway
6 points	Croatia
5 points	Ireland
4 points	Macedonia
3 points	Denmark
2 points	Switzerland
1 point	Netherlands

Points awarded by Romania (Final)
Score	Country
12 points	Moldova
10 points	Greece
8 points	Hungary
7 points	Israel
6 points	Serbia and Montenegro
5 points	Croatia
4 points	Denmark
3 points	Turkey
2 points	Malta
1 point	Cyprus
