= Poland in the Eurovision Song Contest 2005 =

- Eurovision Song Contest 2005
- Participating broadcaster: Telewizja Polska (TVP)
- Country: Poland
- Selection process: Internal Selection
- Selection date: 29 January 2005

Competing entry
- Song: "Czarna dziewczyna"
- Artist: Ivan and Delfin
- Songwriters: Łukasz Lazer; Michał Szymański; Ivan Komarenko

Placement
- Semi-final result: Failed to qualify (11th)

Participation chronology

Poland was represented at the Eurovision Song Contest 2005 with the song "Czarna dziewczyna", written by Łukasz Lazer, Michał Szymański, and Ivan Komarenko, and performed by Ivan and Delfin. The Polish participating broadcaster, Telewizja Polska (TVP), announced in December 2004 that it would internally select its entry for the 2005 contest. On 29 January 2005, "Czarna dziewczyna" performed by Ivan and Delfin was announced as its entry during the TVP1 programme Stratosfera.

Poland competed in the semi-final of the Eurovision Song Contest which took place on 19 May 2005. Performing as the closing entry during the show in position 25, "Czarna dziewczyna" was not announced among the top 10 entries of the first semi-final and therefore did not qualify to compete in the final. It was later revealed that Poland placed eleventh out of the 25 participating countries in the semi-final with 81 points.

== Background ==
Prior to the 2005 contest, Telewizja Polska (TVP) had participated in the Eurovision Song Contest representing Poland nine times since its first entry in 1994. Its highest placement in the contest, to this point, has been second place, achieved with its debut entry in 1994 with the song "To nie ja!" performed by Edyta Górniak. It has only, thus far, reached the top ten on one other occasion, when "Keine Grenzen – Żadnych granic" performed by Ich Troje finished seventh in 2003. In 2004, "Love Song" performed by Blue Café, placed seventeenth in the final.

As part of its duties as participating broadcaster, TVP organises the selection of its entry in the Eurovision Song Contest and broadcasts the event in the country. The broadcaster confirmed its participation in the 2005 contest on 13 December 2004. In 2003 and 2004, TVP organised televised national finals that featured a competition among several artists and songs in order to select its entry. However, on 19 December 2004, TVP announced that it would internally select its entry for the 2005 contest. The last time the broadcaster had internally selected its entry was in 2001.

== Before Eurovision ==
=== Internal selection ===
TVP announced in December 2004 that it would internally select its entry for the Eurovision Song Contest 2005. The broadcaster opened a submission period for interested artists and songwriters to submit their entries between 28 December 2004 and 20 January 2005. TVP received 64 submissions at the closing of the deadline. A 28-member selection committee reviewed the received submissions and selected the Polish entry. The selection committee consisted of:

- Grzegorz Brzozowicz – Journalist and music reviewer
- Maciej Chmiel – Journalist, music reviewer and TV producer
- Jacek Cieślak – Rzeczpospolita
- Janusz Czajka – Wirtualna Polska
- Adam Czerwiński – Radio RMF FM
- Tomasz Deszczyński – OGAE Poland
- Alina Dragan – Polish Radio
- Mariusz Duma – Disco Music Club
- Agustin Egurrola – Dancer and choreographer
- Filip Eichholzer – VIVA Polska
- Leszek Gnoiński – Gazeta Muzyczna
- Wojciech Jagielski – Radio ZET
- Janusz Kosiński – Journalist
- Zygmunt Kukla – Conductor, composer
- Robert Leszczyński – Journalist
- Anna Maliszewska – Producer, screenwriter, director
- Piotr Metz – MTV Polska
- Lech Nowicki – TVP Polonia
- Aleksander Rogoziński – Radio Kolor
- Robert Sankowski – Journalist
- Tomasz Słoń – Interia.pl
- Michał Szcześniak – Director and screenwriter
- Krzysztof Szewczyk – TVP2
- Maria Szabłowska – Polish Radio
- Paweł Sztompke – Polish Radio
- Łukasz Wawro – Onet.pl
- Andrzej Witkowski – TVP1
- Michał Żołądkowski – Radio WAWA

On 29 January 2005 during the TVP1 programme Stratosfera, hosted by Artur Orzech, it was announced that Ivan and Delfin would represent Poland in the Eurovision Song Contest 2005 with the song "Czarna dziewczyna", written by Łukasz Lazer, Michał Szymański, and Ivan Komarenko himself. In addition to the presentation of the song, past Polish representatives, Justyna Steczkowska (1995), Ich Troje (2003) and Blue Café (2004), performed as guests during the show.

Internal Selection – Top 10
Artist	Song	Songwriter(s)	Points	Place
Ivan and Delfin	"Czarna dziewczyna"	Łukasz Lazer, Michał Szymański, Ivan Komarenko	141	1
Monika Jarosińska and Zenon Boczar	"First Kiss"	Zenon Boczar, Jullen Hepple	100	2
Abra	"La Luxe"	Artur Fox, Julian Matej	86	3
Agata Torzewska	"Ma vie"	Piotr Bańka, Agata Torzewska	68	4
Ewa Kowalska and Przyjaciele	"Euro Smile"	Michał Borowicz, Ewa Kowalska	67	5
Leonie	"Miracle"	Leoni Kuizenga, Jeremy Ebell, Bruce Smith	52	6
Krzysztof Antkowiak	"Roses All Around"	Krzysztof Antkowiak, Rafał Buks	49	7
Drum Machina	"Jumpin'"	Krzysztof Antkowiak, Marcin Liber	49	7
Lady Tullo	"Full of Life"	Magdalena Tul, Piotr Marcin	42	9
Zuzanna Szreder	"Did I...?"	Zuzanna Szreder	35	10

== At Eurovision ==
According to Eurovision rules, all nations with the exceptions of the host country, the "Big Four" (France, Germany, Spain and the United Kingdom) and the ten highest placed finishers in the 2004 contest are required to qualify from the semi-final on 19 May 2005 in order to compete for the final on 21 May 2005; the top ten countries from the semi-final progress to the final. On 22 March 2005, an allocation draw was held which determined the running order for the semi-final and Poland was set to perform last in position 25, following the entry from Denmark. At the end of the semi-final, Poland was not announced among the top 10 entries in the semi-final and therefore failed to qualify to compete in the final. It was later revealed that Poland placed eleventh in the semi-final, receiving a total of 81 points.

The semi-final and the final were broadcast in Poland on TVP1 and TVP Polonia with commentary by Artur Orzech. TVP appointed Maciej Orłoś as its spokesperson to announced the Polish votes during the final.

=== Voting ===
Below is a breakdown of points awarded to Poland and awarded by Poland in the semi-final and grand final of the contest. The nation awarded its 12 points to Hungary in the semi-final and to Ukraine in the final of the contest.

==== Points awarded to Poland ====
Points awarded to Poland (Semi-final)
Score	Country
12 points	
10 points	Greece
8 points	Germany; Ukraine
7 points	Spain
6 points	Belarus
5 points	Austria; Belgium; Netherlands; Norway; Russia
4 points	Hungary
3 points	France; Iceland
2 points	Croatia; Sweden
1 point	Latvia; Lithuania; Turkey

==== Points awarded by Poland ====
Points awarded by Poland (Semi-final)
Score	Country
12 points	Hungary
10 points	Denmark
8 points	Romania
7 points	Norway
6 points	Moldova
5 points	Switzerland
4 points	Israel
3 points	Croatia
2 points	Ireland
1 point	Belarus

Points awarded by Poland (Final)
Score	Country
12 points	Ukraine
10 points	Hungary
8 points	Norway
7 points	Romania
6 points	Switzerland
5 points	Denmark
4 points	Latvia
3 points	Moldova
2 points	Croatia
1 point	Greece
