= Moldova in the Eurovision Song Contest 2005 =

- Eurovision Song Contest 2005
- Participating broadcaster: TeleRadio-Moldova (TRM)
- Country: Moldova
- Selection process: O melodie pentru Europa 2005
- Selection date: 26 February 2005

Competing entry
- Song: "Boonika bate doba"
- Artist: Zdob și Zdub
- Songwriters: Mihai Gîncu; Roman Iagupov

Placement
- Semi-final result: Qualified (2nd, 207 points)
- Final result: 6th, 148 points

Participation chronology

Moldova was represented at the Eurovision Song Contest 2005 with the song "Boonika bate doba", composed by Mihai Gîncu, with lyrics by Roman Iagupov, and performed by the band Zdob și Zdub. The Moldovan participating broadcaster, TeleRadio-Moldova (TRM), organised the national final O melodie pentru Europa 2005 in order to select its entry for the contest. This was the first-ever entry from Moldova in the Eurovision Song Contest.

Thirty-five entries competed to represent Moldova in Kyiv, with 15 being shortlisted to participate in the televised national final which took place on 26 February 2005. "Boonika bate doba" performed by Zdob și Zdub emerged as the winner after gaining the most points following the combination of votes from a jury panel and a public televote.

Moldova competed in the semi-final of the Eurovision Song Contest which took place on 19 May 2005. Performing during the show in position 4, "Boonika bate doba" was announced among the top 10 entries of the semi-final and therefore qualified to compete in the final on 21 May. It was later revealed that Moldova placed second out of the 25 participating countries in the semi-final with 207 points. In the final, Moldova performed in position 7 and placed sixth out of the 24 participating countries, scoring 148 points.

== Background ==
On 4 November 2004, the Moldovan national broadcaster, TeleRadio-Moldova (TRM), confirmed its intentions to debut at the Eurovision Song Contest in its 2005 edition. The broadcaster had previously planned to debut at the contest in 1996. TRM organised a national final to select its debut entry for the 2005 contest.

== Before Eurovision ==
=== O melodie pentru Europa 2005 ===
O melodie pentru Europa 2005 was the national final format developed by TRM in order to select its entry for the Eurovision Song Contest 2005. 35 valid entries were received by the broadcaster for the national final after artists and composers were directly invited to submit their entries. A jury consisting of Lidia Panfil (director), Andrei Sava (composer), Teodor Radulescu (choreographer) and Anatol Caciuc (journalist and music expert) selected 15 finalists out of the 35 received entries, which were announced on 7 February 2005.

Artist	Song	Songwriter(s)	Points	Place
Adrian Ursu	"Lacrimi și durere"	Adrian Ursu	35	5
Alexa	"Un sărut"	Adrian Ursu	30	10
Alternosfera	"O mie cinci sute"	Alternosfera	30	10
Cezara	"Pentru tine"	V. Odobescu, A. Mura	33	7
Edict	"Ploaia ta"	Valeriu Cataraga	30	10
Gândul Mâței	"Am să vin"	Nicu Țărnă	36	3
Iana Ștefan	"La iubire nu voi renunța"	Iulian Țurcanu, Alexandru Gorgos	35	5
In Quadro	"I'm Begging You"	Ion Lozovan, Andrei Țarălungă, Igor Pșenicinîi, Andrei Țăruș	32	8
Johnny Alici	"Evolution"	Johnny Alici	29	15
Lou	"Yellow Roses"	Vadim Luchin	30	10
Millenium	"Tablou pe sticlă"	Georgeta Voinovan, Alexandru Gorgos	36	3
Nelly Ciobanu	"One More Time"	Mirela Fugaru, Liviu Știrbu	40	1
Nona Marian	"Mă cheamă dragostea"	Nona Marian	30	10
Sergiu Cuzencov	"Steaua ta"	Marian Stîrcea	32	8
Zdob și Zdub	"Boonika bate doba"	Mihai Gîncu, Roman Iagupov	39	2

==== Final ====
The final took place on 26 February 2005 at the National Palace in Chișinău, hosted by Aurelia Vasilică and Valeriu Myrza and broadcast on Moldova 1 as well as Radio Moldova. Fifteen songs competed and the winner was selected based on the combination of a public televote and the votes of an expert jury. "Boonika bate doba" performed by Zdob și Zdub was selected as the winner.

Final – 26 February 2005
R/O	Artist	Song	Jury	Televote		Total	Place
R/O	Artist	Song	Jury	Votes	Points	Total	Place
1	Johnny Alici	"Evolution"	0	233	0	0	12
2	Nelly Ciobanu	"One More Time"	8	5,332	10	18	2
3	Nona Marian	"Mă cheamă dragostea"	2	290	1	3	9
4	Iana Ștefan	"La iubire nu voi renunța"	0	143	0	0	12
5	Lou	"Yellow Roses"	3	710	6	9	7
6	Cezara	"Pentru tine"	0	169	0	0	12
7	Millennium	"Tablou pe sticlă"	12	661	5	17	3
8	Alternosfera	"O mie cinci sute"	1	267	0	1	11
9	Zdob și Zdub	"Boonika bate doba"	10	5,441	12	22	1
10	Adrian Ursu	"Lacrimi și durere"	5	1,796	8	13	4
11	In Quadro	"I'm Begging You"	4	1,200	7	11	5
12	Edict	"Ploaia ta"	0	183	0	0	12
13	Sergiu Cuzencov	"Steaua ta"	7	444	3	10	6
14	Gândul Mâței	"Am să vin"	6	416	2	8	8
15	Alexa	"Un sărut"	0	515	4	4	10

== At Eurovision ==
According to Eurovision rules, all nations with the exceptions of the host country, the "Big Four" (France, Germany, Spain and the United Kingdom), and the ten highest placed finishers in the 2004 contest are required to qualify from the semi-final on 19 May 2005 in order to compete for the final on 21 May 2005; the top ten countries from the semi-final progress to the final. On 22 March 2005, a special allocation draw was held which determined the running order for the semi-final and Moldova was set to perform in position 4, following the entry from Portugal and before the entry from Latvia. Zdob și Zdub were joined on stage by 52 year-old drummer Lidia Bejenaru for the stage performance and at the end of the show, Moldova was announced as having finished in the top 10 and subsequently qualifying for the grand final. It was later revealed that Moldova placed second in the semi-final, receiving a total of 207 points. The draw for the running order for the final was done by the presenters during the announcement of the ten qualifying countries during the semi-final and Moldova was drawn to perform in position 7, following the entry from Turkey and before the entry from Albania. Moldova placed sixth in the final, scoring 148 points.

The two shows were televised in Moldova on Moldova 1 and Radio Moldova. All broadcasts featured commentary by Vitalie Rotaru. TRM appointed Elena Camerzan as its spokesperson to announce the Moldovan votes during the final.

=== Voting ===
Below is a breakdown of points awarded to Moldova and awarded by Moldova in the semi-final and grand final of the contest. The nation awarded its 12 points to Romania in the semi-final and to Latvia in the final of the contest. Moldova only awarded 7 points to Romania in the final, which sparked controversy in the latter country as they considered the action as an "unfriendly gesture". TRM would later clarify that while Moldova's semi-final vote was based on 100 percent televoting, their vote in the final was based on 100 percent jury voting due to an insufficient number of valid votes cast during the televote period.

==== Points awarded to Moldova ====
Points awarded to Moldova (Semi-final)
Score	Country
12 points	Romania; Russia; Turkey; Ukraine
10 points	Belarus; Israel; Latvia; Lithuania; Macedonia
8 points	Austria; Cyprus; Iceland; Portugal
7 points	Slovenia
6 points	Bosnia and Herzegovina; Bulgaria; Greece; Hungary; Poland; Serbia and Montenegro
5 points	Estonia; France; United Kingdom
4 points	Belgium; Croatia
3 points	Albania; Finland; Ireland
2 points	
1 point	Norway; Spain

Points awarded to Moldova (Final)
Score	Country
12 points	Romania; Ukraine
10 points	Lithuania; Portugal; Russia
8 points	Iceland; Latvia
7 points	Belarus; Greece; Turkey
6 points	Bulgaria; Estonia
5 points	Macedonia; Serbia and Montenegro
4 points	Bosnia and Herzegovina; Hungary; Israel; Spain
3 points	Poland; Slovenia
2 points	Austria; Cyprus; France; Malta; United Kingdom
1 point	Belgium; Croatia; Germany

==== Points awarded by Moldova ====
Points awarded by Moldova (Semi-final)
Score	Country
12 points	Romania
10 points	Iceland
8 points	Norway
7 points	Bulgaria
6 points	Croatia
5 points	Israel
4 points	Andorra
3 points	Belgium
2 points	Monaco
1 point	Estonia

Points awarded by Moldova (Final)
Score	Country
12 points	Latvia
10 points	Russia
8 points	Ukraine
7 points	Romania
6 points	Israel
5 points	Sweden
4 points	Greece
3 points	Norway
2 points	Germany
1 point	Serbia and Montenegro
