= Iceland in the Eurovision Song Contest 2005 =

- Eurovision Song Contest 2005
- Participating broadcaster: Ríkisútvarpið (RÚV)
- Country: Iceland
- Selection process: Internal selection
- Announcement date: Artist: 8 February 2005; Song: 19 March 2005

Competing entry
- Song: "If I Had Your Love"
- Artist: Selma
- Songwriters: Þorvaldur Bjarni Þorvaldsson; Vignir Snær Vigfússon; Selma Björnsdóttir; Linda Thompson

Placement
- Semi-final result: Failed to qualify (16th)

Participation chronology

Iceland was represented at the Eurovision Song Contest 2005 with the song "If I Had Your Love", written by Þorvaldur Bjarni Þorvaldsson, Vignir Snær Vigfússon, Linda Thompson, and Selma Björnsdóttir, and performed by Selma herself. The Icelandic participating broadcaster, Ríkisútvarpið (RÚV), internally selected its entry for the contest. Selma had represented Iceland in 1999. The song, "If I Had Your Love", was presented to the public on 19 March 2005 during the television programme Laugardagskvöld með Gísla Marteini.

Iceland competed in the semi-final of the Eurovision Song Contest which took place on 19 May 2005. Performing during the show in position 10, "If I Had Your Love" was not announced among the top 10 entries of the semi-final and therefore did not qualify to compete in the final. It was later revealed that Iceland placed sixteenth out of the 25 participating countries in the semi-final with 52 points.

== Background ==
Prior to the 2005 Contest, Ríkisútvarpið (RÚV) had participated in the Eurovision Song Contest representing Iceland seventeen times since its first entry in 1986. Its best placing in the contest to this point was second, achieved in 1999 with the song "All Out of Luck" performed by Selma. In 2004, "Heaven" performed by Jónsi placed nineteenth in the final.

As part of its duties as participating broadcaster, RÚV organises the selection of its entry in the Eurovision Song Contest and broadcasts the event in the country. The broadcaster confirmed its intentions to participate at the 2005 contest on 27 July 2004. Between 2000 and 2003, RÚV has used a national final to select its entry for the contest, while it opted to internally select its entry in 2004. For 2005, the broadcaster initially announced along with its participation confirmation that it would use a national final to select its entry; however, it later announced that it would internally select its entry instead due to financial reasons and plans for other projects.

== Before Eurovision ==
=== Internal selection ===
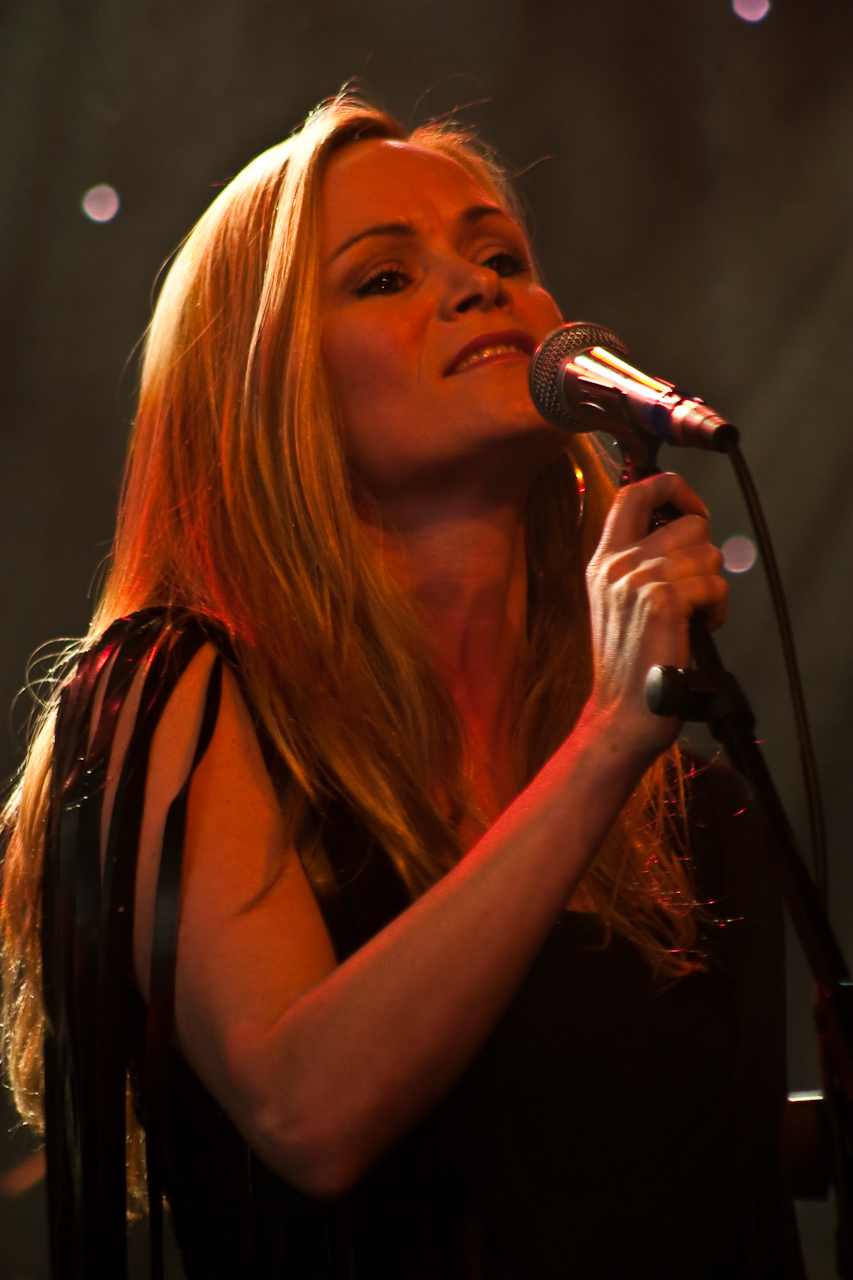
Selma was internally selected to represent Iceland for a second time

On 20 December 2004, RÚV announced that it would internally select its entry for the Eurovision Song Contest 2005. On 7 February 2005, Selma Björnsdóttir who previously represented Iceland in 1999 and placed second with the song "All Out of Luck" revealed that she had been approached by the broadcaster, but was yet to make a decision. Selma was confirmed as the Icelandic representative on 8 February 2005 during the RÚV evening news broadcast. In regards to her selection as the Icelandic entrant, Selma stated: "I'm very excited about all of this. We've been very busy lately. A competition such as this one requires careful planning and hard work, but there are many good times ahead, I'm sure."

On 3 March 2005, it was announced that Selma would be performing the song "If I Had Your Love", composed by Þorvaldur Bjarni Þorvaldsson and Vignir Snær Vigfússon with lyrics by Linda Thompson and Selma herself. The singer previously revealed during her announcement as the Icelandic entrant that her song would be selected in cooperation with Þorvaldsson who co-wrote her 1999 entry. "If I Had Your Love" was presented to the public along with the release of the official music video, filmed in early March 2005 and directed by Gudjon Jonsson from Spark Production, on 19 March 2005 during the television programme Laugardagskvöld með Gísla Marteini.

== At Eurovision ==
According to Eurovision rules, all nations with the exceptions of the host country, the "Big Four" (France, Germany, Spain, and the United Kingdom) and the ten highest placed finishers in the 2004 contest are required to qualify from the semi-final on 19 May 2005 in order to compete for the final on 21 May 2005; the top ten countries from the semi-final progress to the final. On 22 March 2005, a special allocation draw was held which determined the running order for the semi-final and Iceland was set to perform in position 10, following the entry from the Netherlands and before the entry from Belgium.

During the semi-final performance, Selma was dressed in a red outfit with gold trimmings and performed choreography with four dancers dressed in white and gold outfits, all of them which also performed backing vocals. Among the backing performers was Regína Ósk, who would later represent Iceland in 2008 as part of the duo Euroband. At the end of the semi-final, Iceland was not announced among the top 10 entries in the semi-final and therefore failed to qualify to compete in the final. It was later revealed that Iceland placed sixteenth in the semi-final, receiving a total of 52 points.

The semi-final and the final were broadcast in Iceland on RÚV with commentary by Gísli Marteinn Baldursson. RÚV appointed Ragnhildur Steinunn Jónsdóttir as its spokesperson to announce the Icelandic votes during the final.

=== Voting ===
Below is a breakdown of points awarded to Iceland and awarded by Iceland in the semi-final and grand final of the contest. The nation awarded its 12 points to Norway in the semi-final and the final of the contest.

==== Points awarded to Iceland ====
Points awarded to Iceland (Semi-final)
Score	Country
12 points	
10 points	Denmark; Moldova
8 points	Norway
7 points	Sweden
6 points	Andorra
5 points	
4 points	Israel
3 points	United Kingdom
2 points	France; Spain
1 point	

==== Points awarded by Iceland ====
Points awarded by Iceland (Semi-final)
Score	Country
12 points	Norway
10 points	Denmark
8 points	Moldova
7 points	Hungary
6 points	Switzerland
5 points	Romania
4 points	Croatia
3 points	Poland
2 points	Latvia
1 point	Slovenia

Points awarded by Iceland (Final)
Score	Country
12 points	Norway
10 points	Denmark
8 points	Moldova
7 points	Switzerland
6 points	Hungary
5 points	Romania
4 points	Malta
3 points	Latvia
2 points	Greece
1 point	Croatia
