= Israel in the Eurovision Song Contest 2005 =

- Eurovision Song Contest 2005
- Participating broadcaster: Israel Broadcasting Authority (IBA)
- Country: Israel
- Selection process: Kdam Eurovision 2005
- Selection date: 2 March 2005

Competing entry
- Song: "HaSheket SheNish'ar"
- Artist: Shiri Maimon
- Songwriters: Pini Aharonbayev; Eyal Shahar; Ben Green

Placement
- Semi-final result: Qualified (7th, 158 points)
- Final result: 4th, 154 points

Participation chronology

Israel was represented at the Eurovision Song Contest 2005 with the song "HaSheket SheNish'ar", written by Pini Aaronbayev, Eyal Shachar, and Ben Green, and performed by Shiri Maimon. The Israeli participating broadcaster, the Israel Broadcasting Authority (IBA), selected its entry through the national final Kdam Eurovision 2005. The competition took place on 2 March 2005 and featured fourteen entries. "HaSheket SheNish'ar" performed by Shiri Maimon emerged as the winner after gaining the most points following the combination of votes from five regional juries and a regional televote.

Israel competed in the semi-final of the Eurovision Song Contest which took place on 19 May 2005. Performing during the show in position 7, "HaSheket SheNish'ar" was announced among the top 10 entries of the semi-final and therefore qualified to compete in the final on 21 May. It was later revealed that Israel placed seventh out of the 25 participating countries in the semi-final with 158 points. In the final, Israel performed in position 11 and placed fourth out of the 24 participating countries, scoring 154 points.

== Background ==
Prior to the 2004 contest, the Israel Broadcasting Authority (IBA) had participated in the Eurovision Song Contest representing Israel twenty-six times since its first entry in 1973. It has won the contest on three occasions: in 1978 with the song "A-Ba-Ni-Bi" by Izhar Cohen and the Alphabeta, in 1979 with the song "Hallelujah" by Milk and Honey, in 1998 with the song "Diva" by Dana International. In 2004, "Leha'amin" performed by David D'Or failed to qualify from the semi-final.

As part of its duties as participating broadcaster, IBA organises the selection of its entry in the Eurovision Song Contest and broadcasts the event in the country. The broadcaster confirmed its participation in the 2005 contest on 20 September 2004. In 2005, IBA opted to organise a national final with several entries. The competition was planned to feature a new format with four shows taking place in different cities across Israel, however, only one final was ultimately held.

== Before Eurovision ==
=== Kdam Eurovision 2005 ===
Kdam Eurovision 2005 was the national final format organised by IBA to select its entry for the Eurovision Song Contest 2005. The competition took place on 2 March 2005 at the Neve Ilan television studios in Jerusalem, hosted by Moran Atias and Didi Harrari and was broadcast on Channel 1 as well as online via iba.org.il/eurovil. The national final was watched by 376,000 viewers in Israel with a market share of 22.1%.

==== Competing entries ====
IBA directly invited fourteen artists to participate in the competition. Thirteen of the competing acts were announced on 26 December 2004, while the fourteenth act, the Elayev Family, was announced on 14 January 2005. The artists were required to submit their entries by the deadline on 31 January 2005, and the songs were presented prior to the competition during a special radio programme on Reshet Gimmel on 15 February 2005.

Artist	Song	Songwriter(s)
Gaya	"Ode-le-ya" (אודה-ל-יה)	Gili Liber, Ami Reiss
Merav Siman-Tov	"Hamon" (המון)	Merav Siman-Tov
Michal Amdursky	"Targish Oti" (תרגיש אותי)	Michal Amdursky, Noya Symantov
Mira Awad	"Zman" (זמן)	Ehud Manor, Mira Awad
Momi Levi	"Yesh Li Et Halayla" (יש לי את הלילה)	Nir Mamon, Momi Levi
Rinat Bar	"Kmo Chalom" (כמו חלום)	Ilan Leibovich, Chamutal Ben Ze'ev
Rinat Gabay	"Jerusalem"	Ehud Manor, Rinat Gabay
Samir Shukri and Efrat Cohen	"Be'ahava Gdola" (באהבה גדולה)	Zohar Laskov
Sharona and Daniella Pick	"Hello, Hello"	Sharona Pick, Mirit Shem-Or
Shiri Maimon	"Hasheket Shenish'ar" (השקט שנשאר)	Pini Aaronbayev, Eyal Shachar
Svika Pick and Company	"Or Yare'ach" (אור ירח)	Mirit Shem-Or, Svika Pick
The Elayev Family	"Esperansa" (אספרנסה)	Doron Davidsko, Eli Nissman
Yossi Azulai	"Don't Worry Baby"	Yossi Azulai
Zehava Ben	"Peace and Love"	Yoram Zadok, Reuven Pinto

==== Final ====
The final took place on 2 March 2005. The winner, "HaSheket SheNish'ar" performed by Shiri Maimon, was selected by a 50/50 combination of votes from five regional juries and a regional televote. In addition to the performances of the competing entries, show host Moran Atias together with Sassi Keshet and the Jerusalem Boys Choir performed as the opening act, while Harel Skaat, Izhar Cohen (who won Eurovision for Israel in 1978) and Ruslana (who won Eurovision for Ukraine in 2004) performed as the interval acts.

Final – 2 March 2005
R/O	Artist	Song	Jury	Televote	Total	Place
1	Samir Shukri and Efrat Cohen	"Be'ahava Gdola"	0	26	26	9
2	Zehava Ben	"Peace and Love"	12	36	48	5
3	Michal Amdursky	"Targish Oti"	16	23	39	8
4	Momi Levi	"Yesh Li Et Halayla"	20	3	23	10
5	Merav Siman-Tov	"Hamon"	8	2	10	13
6	Gaya	"Ode-le-ya"	12	3	15	11
7	Shiri Maimon	"Hasheket Shenish'ar"	58	58	116	1
8	Rinat Gabay	"Jerusalem"	39	23	62	4
9	Yossi Azulai	"Don't Worry Baby"	33	37	70	2
10	Mira Awad	"Zman"	5	0	5	14
11	The Elayev Family	"Esperansa"	16	29	45	6
12	Sharona and Daniella Pick	"Hello, Hello"	12	3	15	11
13	Svika Pick and Company	"Or Yare'ach"	26	40	66	3
14	Rinat Bar	"Kmo Chalom"	33	7	40	7

Detailed Regional Jury Votes
R/O	Song	Kiryat Shmona	Haifa	Tel Aviv	Be'er Sheva	Jerusalem	Total
1	"Be'ahava Gdola"						0
2	"Peace and Love"			2	2	8	12
3	"Targish Oti"		5		6	5	16
4	"Yesh Li Et Halayla"	4	4	7	5		20
5	"Hamon"			1	4	3	8
6	"Ode-le-ya"	3	2	4	3		12
7	"Hasheket Shenish'ar"	10	12	12	12	12	58
8	"Jerusalem"	12	10	5	10	2	39
9	"Don't Worry Baby"	8	6	8	7	4	33
10	"Zman"	2		3			5
11	"Esperansa"	7	3			6	16
12	"Hello, Hello"	1	1			10	12
13	"Or Yare'ach"	6	8	10	1	1	26
14	"Kmo Chalom"	5	7	6	8	7	33

Detailed Regional Televoting Results
R/O	Song	Haifa and Northern	Tel Aviv and Central	Sharon	Lowland and Southern	Jerusalem	Total
1	"Be'ahava Gdola"	10	4	4	3	5	26
2	"Peace and Love"	5	7	10	10	4	36
3	"Targish Oti"	7	5	6	4	1	23
4	"Yesh Li Et Halayla"					3	3
5	"Hamon"					2	2
6	"Ode-le-ya"	3					3
7	"Hasheket Shenish'ar"	12	12	12	12	10	58
8	"Jerusalem"	4	3	3	7	6	23
9	"Don't Worry Baby"	6	6	5	8	12	37
10	"Zman"						0
11	"Esperansa"	2	8	7	5	7	29
12	"Hello, Hello"		1	1	1		3
13	"Or Yare'ach"	8	10	8	6	8	40
14	"Kmo Chalom"	1	2	2	2		7

== At Eurovision ==
According to Eurovision rules, all nations with the exceptions of the host country, the "Big Four" (France, Germany, Spain and the United Kingdom), and the ten highest placed finishers in the 2004 contest are required to qualify from the semi-final on 19 May 2005 in order to compete for the final on 21 May 2005; the top ten countries from the semi-final progress to the final. On 22 March 2005, an allocation draw was held which determined the running order for the semi-final and Israel was set to perform in position 7, following the entry from Monaco and before the entry from Belarus. At the end of the semi-final, Israel was announced as having finished in the top 10 and subsequently qualifying for the grand final. It was later revealed that Israel placed seventh in the semi-final, receiving a total of 158 points. The draw for the running order for the final was done by the presenters during the announcement of the ten qualifying countries during the semi-final and Israel was drawn to perform in position 11, following the entry from Spain and before the entry from Serbia and Montenegro. Israel placed fourth in the final, scoring 154 points.

The semi-final received a market share of 22.5% in Israel with a peak of 31.1%, while the final received a market share of 39.5% in Israel with a peak of 47.9%. Both shows were televised live on Channel 1. IBA appointed Dana Herman as its spokesperson to announce the Israeli votes during the final.

=== Voting ===
Below is a breakdown of points awarded to Israel and awarded by Israel in the semi-final and grand final of the contest. The nation awarded its 12 points to Romania in the semi-final and the final of the contest.

==== Points awarded to Israel ====
Points awarded to Israel (Semi-final)
Score	Country
12 points	Andorra; Belarus; Monaco
10 points	Netherlands
8 points	France; Romania; Russia
7 points	Albania; Ireland
6 points	Malta; Portugal; Turkey; United Kingdom
5 points	Hungary; Moldova; Ukraine
4 points	Bulgaria; Denmark; Poland; Spain
3 points	Belgium; Cyprus; Germany; Serbia and Montenegro; Switzerland
2 points	Lithuania
1 point	Finland; Macedonia

Points awarded to Israel (Final)
Score	Country
12 points	Monaco
10 points	France
8 points	Andorra; Belarus; Hungary; Malta; Russia
7 points	Netherlands; Romania; Ukraine; United Kingdom
6 points	Belgium; Ireland; Moldova; Spain
5 points	Denmark; Finland; Germany; Norway; Portugal
4 points	
3 points	Albania; Lithuania; Turkey
2 points	Latvia
1 point	Austria; Estonia; Sweden; Switzerland

==== Points awarded by Israel ====
Points awarded by Israel (Semi-final)
Score	Country
12 points	Romania
10 points	Moldova
8 points	Hungary
7 points	Norway
6 points	Latvia
5 points	Netherlands
4 points	Iceland
3 points	Switzerland
2 points	Belarus
1 point	Slovenia

Points awarded by Israel (Final)
Score	Country
12 points	Romania
10 points	Malta
8 points	Hungary
7 points	Greece
6 points	Latvia
5 points	France
4 points	Moldova
3 points	Denmark
2 points	Switzerland
1 point	Norway
