= Denmark in the Eurovision Song Contest 2005 =

- Eurovision Song Contest 2005
- Participating broadcaster: Danmarks Radio (DR)
- Country: Denmark
- Selection process: Dansk Melodi Grand Prix 2005
- Selection date: 12 February 2005

Competing entry
- Song: "Talking to You"
- Artist: Jakob Sveistrup
- Songwriters: Jacob Launbjerg; Andreas Mørck

Placement
- Semi-final result: Qualified (3rd, 185 points)
- Final result: 9th, 125 points

Participation chronology

Denmark was represented at the Eurovision Song Contest 2005 with the song "Talking to You", written by Jacob Launbjerg and Andreas Mørck, and performed by Jakob Sveistrup. The Danish participating broadcaster, Danmarks Radio (DR), organised the national final Dansk Melodi Grand Prix 2005 in order to select its entry for the contest. Ten songs competed in a televised show where "Tænder på dig" performed by Jakob Sveistrup was the winner as decided upon through two rounds of public voting. The song was later translated from Danish to English for Eurovision and was titled "Talking to You".

Denmark competed in the semi-final of the Eurovision Song Contest which took place on 19 May 2005. Performing during the show in position 24, "Talking to You" was announced among the top 10 entries of the semi-final and therefore qualified to compete in the final on 21 May. It was later revealed that Denmark placed third out of the 25 participating countries in the semi-final with 185 points. In the final, Denmark performed in position 13 and placed ninth out of the 24 participating countries, scoring 125 points.

== Background ==
Prior to the 2005 contest, Danmarks Radio (DR) had participated in the Eurovision Song Contest representing Denmark thirty-three times since its first entry in 1957. It had won the contest, to this point, on two occasions: in 1963 with the song "Dansevise" performed by Grethe and Jørgen Ingmann, and in 2000 with the song "Fly on the Wings of Love" performed by Olsen Brothers. In 2004, "Shame on You" performed by Tomas Thordarson failed to qualify to the final.

As part of its duties as participating broadcaster, DR organises the selection of its entry in the Eurovision Song Contest and broadcasts the event in the country. The broadcaster confirmed its intentions to participate at the 2005 contest on 11 August 2004. DR has selected all but one of its Eurovision entries through the national final Dansk Melodi Grand Prix. Along with its participation confirmation, the broadcaster announced that Dansk Melodi Grand Prix 2005 would be organised in order to select its entry for the 2005 contest.

== Before Eurovision ==
=== Dansk Melodi Grand Prix 2005 ===
Dansk Melodi Grand Prix 2004 was the 35th edition of Dansk Melodi Grand Prix, the music competition organised by DR to select its entries for the Eurovision Song Contest. The event was held on 12 February 2005 at the Forum Horsens in Horsens, hosted by Birthe Kjær, Annette Heick and Jarl Friis-Mikkelsen and televised on DR1 as well as streamed online at the official DR website. The national final was watched by 1.918 million viewers in Denmark.

==== Competing entries ====
DR opened a submission period between 11 August 2004 and 10 October 2004 for composers to submit their entries. All composers and lyricists were required to be Danish citizens or have been registered as a Danish resident from 12 August 2004 to 21 May 2004. For the first time, songs could be performed in other languages other than Danish. The broadcaster received 236 entries during the submission period. A selection committee selected ten songs from the entries submitted to the broadcaster, while the artists of the selected entries were chosen by DR in consultation with their composers. The competing artists and songs were announced on 9 December 2004 and among the artists was the Olsen Brothers who won Eurovision for Denmark in 2000.

Artist	Song	Songwriter(s)
Chi Hua Hua	"Uhh la la la"	Søren Poppe, Jan Lysdahl
Ditlev Ulriksen	"Troublesome"	Morten Remar, Ditlev Ulriksen
Jakob Sveistrup	"Tænder på dig"	Jacob Launbjerg, Andreas Mørck
Kandis	"Lonnie fra Berlin"	Johnny Hansen
Kim Schwartz	"En smule af dig"	Dennis Dehnhardt
Luna Park	"I Believe in Love"	Jascha Richter
Marie Keis Uhre	"Make a Wish"	Gry Trampedach, Jesper Hofmann
Olsen Brothers	"Little Yellow Radio"	Jørgen Olsen, Niels Olsen
Sweethearts	"I Must Be Crazy"	Martin Brygmann, Pernille Højmark, Kim Kidholm
Tamra Rosanes	"Peace, Understanding and Love"	Tamra Rosanes

==== Final ====
The final took place on 12 February 2005 where the winner was determined over two rounds of public voting. In the first round of voting the top five advanced to the superfinal. In the superfinal, the winner, "Tænder på dig" performed by Jakob Sveistrup, was selected. Viewers were able to vote via telephone or SMS and the telephone voting results of each of Denmark's four regions as well as the SMS voting results in the superfinal were converted to points which were each distributed as follows: 8, 10 and 12 points.

Final – 12 February 2005
R/O	Artist	Song	Result
1	Chi Hua Hua	"Uhh la la la"	—N/a
2	Luna Park	"I Believe in Love"	Advanced
3	Tamra Rosanes	"Peace, Understanding and Love"	Advanced
4	Kandis	"Lonnie fra Berlin"	—N/a
5	Olsen Brothers	"Little Yellow Radio"	Advanced
6	Kim Schwartz	"En smule af dig"	—N/a
7	Ditlev Ulriksen	"Troublesome"	—N/a
8	Jakob Sveistrup	"Tænder på dig"	Advanced
9	Sweethearts	"I Must Be Crazy"	—N/a
10	Marie Keis Uhre	"Make a Wish"	Advanced

Superfinal – 12 February 2005
R/O	Artist	Song	Televoting Regions				SMS	Total	Place
R/O	Artist	Song	Jutland	Funen	Zealand and Islands	Capital Region	SMS	Total	Place
1	Luna Park	"I Believe in Love"	8				8	16	3
2	Tamra Rosanes	"Peace, Understanding and Love"				8		8	5
3	Olsen Brothers	"Little Yellow Radio"	10	10	12	10	10	52	2
4	Jakob Sveistrup	"Tænder på dig"	12	12	10	12	12	58	1
5	Marie Keis Uhre	"Make a Wish"		8	8			16	3

== At Eurovision ==
According to Eurovision rules, all nations with the exceptions of the host country, the "Big Four" (France, Germany, Spain and the United Kingdom), and the ten highest placed finishers in the 2004 contest are required to qualify from the semi-final on 19 May 2005 in order to compete for the final on 21 May 2005; the top ten countries from the semi-final progress to the final. On 22 March 2005, an allocation draw was held which determined the running order for the semi-final and Denmark was set to perform in position 24, following the entry from Slovenia and before the entry from Poland. Jakob Sveistrup performed the English version of "Tænder på dig" at the contest, titled "Talking to You". At the end of the semi-final, Denmark was announced as having finished in the top 10 and subsequently qualifying for the grand final. It was later revealed that Denmark placed third in the semi-final, receiving a total of 185 points. The draw for the running order for the final was done by the presenters during the announcement of the ten qualifying countries during the semi-final and Denmark was drawn to perform in position 13, following the entry from Serbia and Montenegro and before the entry from Sweden. Denmark placed ninth in the final, scoring 125 points.

The semi-final and final were broadcast on DR1 with commentary by Jørgen de Mylius. DR appointed Gry Johansen (who represented Denmark in 1983) as its spokesperson to announce the Danish votes during the final. The semi-final of the contest was watched by a total of 832 thousand viewers in Denmark, while the final was watched by 1.3 million viewers.

=== Voting ===
Below is a breakdown of points awarded to Denmark and awarded by Denmark in the semi-final and grand final of the contest. The nation awarded its 12 points to Norway in the semi-final and the final of the contest.

==== Points awarded to Denmark ====
Points awarded to Denmark (Semi-final)
Score	Country
12 points	Ireland; Netherlands; Norway; Sweden
10 points	Iceland; Monaco; Poland; United Kingdom
8 points	Andorra; Finland; Spain
7 points	Belgium; Estonia; Hungary; Lithuania; Switzerland
6 points	Austria; Croatia
5 points	Germany; Portugal
4 points	Malta; Russia
3 points	Romania
2 points	Greece; Latvia
1 point	France

Points awarded to Denmark (Final)
Score	Country
12 points	Norway
10 points	Iceland; Monaco; Spain; Sweden
8 points	Netherlands; United Kingdom
7 points	Ireland
6 points	Germany; Hungary
5 points	Estonia; Poland
4 points	Belgium; Latvia; Lithuania; Romania
3 points	Andorra; Israel; Malta
2 points	Finland
1 point	Portugal

==== Points awarded by Denmark ====
Points awarded by Denmark (Semi-final)
Score	Country
12 points	Norway
10 points	Iceland
8 points	Finland
7 points	Romania
6 points	Netherlands
5 points	Latvia
4 points	Israel
3 points	Estonia
2 points	Switzerland
1 point	Hungary

Points awarded by Denmark (Final)
Score	Country
12 points	Norway
10 points	Malta
8 points	Turkey
7 points	Sweden
6 points	Latvia
5 points	Israel
4 points	Bosnia and Herzegovina
3 points	Romania
2 points	Greece
1 point	Switzerland
