= France in the Eurovision Song Contest 2005 =

- Eurovision Song Contest 2005
- Participating broadcaster: France Télévisions
- Country: France
- Selection process: Un candidat pour l'Eurovision
- Selection date: 15 March 2005

Competing entry
- Song: "Chacun pense à soi"
- Artist: Ortal
- Songwriters: Ortal; Saad Tabainet

Placement
- Final result: 23rd, 11 points

Participation chronology

France was represented at the Eurovision Song Contest 2005 with the song "Chacun pense à soi", written by Ortal and Saad Tabainet, and performed by Ortal herself. The French participating broadcaster, France Télévisions, organised the national final Un candidat pour l'Eurovision in order to select its entry for the 2005 contest. Five songs competed in the national final on 15 March 2005 where "Chacun pense à soi" performed by Ortal was selected as the winner following the combination of votes from a five-member jury panel and a public vote.

As a member of the "Big Four", France automatically qualified to compete in the final of the Eurovision Song Contest. Performing as the closing entry during the show in position 24, France placed twenty-third out of the 24 participating countries with 11 points.

== Background ==
Prior to the 2005 Contest, France Télévisions and its predecessor national broadcasters, have participated in the Eurovision Song Contest representing France forty-seven times since RTF's debut in 1956. They first won the contest in 1958 with "Dors, mon amour" performed by André Claveau. In the 1960s, they won three times, with "Tom Pillibi" performed by Jacqueline Boyer in 1960, "Un premier amour" performed by Isabelle Aubret in 1962, and "Un jour, un enfant" performed by Frida Boccara, who won in 1969 in a four-way tie with the Netherlands, Spain, and the United Kingdom. Their fifth – and so far latest – victory came in 1977 with "L'oiseau et l'enfant" performed by Marie Myriam. France has also finished second four times, with Paule Desjardins in 1957, Catherine Ferry in 1976, Joëlle Ursull in 1990, and Amina in 1991 (who lost out to Sweden's Carola in a tie-break). In the 21st century, it has making the top ten two times, with "Je n'ai que mon âme" performed by Natasha St-Pier finishing fourth in 2001 and "Il faut du temps" by Sandrine François finishing fifth in 2002. In 2004, "À chaque pas" performed by Jonatan Cerrada finished in fifteenth place.

As part of its duties as participating broadcaster, France Télévisions organises the selection of its entry in the Eurovision Song Contest and broadcasts the event in the country through France 3. The broadcaster confirmed that it would participate in the 2005 contest on 31 August 2004. The French broadcasters had used both national finals and internal selection to choose their entries in the past. From 2001 to 2004, France Télévisions opted to internally select its entries. In January 2005, the broadcaster announced that its 2005 entry would be selected via a national final that would feature five competing acts. This marked the first time since 2000 that a national final would be organised to select the French entry.

== Before Eurovision ==
=== Un candidat pour l'Eurovision ===
Un candidat pour l'Eurovision was the national final organised by France Télévisions to select its entry for the Eurovision Song Contest 2005. The competition took place on 15 March 2005 at the La Plaine St-Denis television studios in Paris, hosted by Laurent Ruquier and Elsa Fayer. The show was broadcast on France 3. The national final was watched by 2 million viewers in France with a market share of 12.4%.

==== Competing entries ====
France Télévisions opened a submission period on 11 January 2005 in order for record companies to propose artists up until the deadline on 31 January 2005. At the closing of the deadline, the French broadcaster received 13 proposals, and five artists were selected to compete in the national final following auditions. The competing artists were announced on 17 February 2005. On 11 March 2005, the competing songs were previewed online and formally presented to the public on 17 February 2005 during an introductory documentary that also covered the entries selection process for the national final.

Artist	Song	Songwriter(s)	Label
Christophe Héraut	"C'est la vie"	Antonio Angelelli, Gérard Capaldi, Bruno Grimaldi, Christophe Héraut	BG Productions
Karine Trecy	"Laissez moi rêver"	Karine Trecy, Zoë Pollock	BMG
Lionel Tim	"Je m'envole"	Léa Ivanne, Bill Ghiglione	Universal
Marjorie Galluccio	"Casting"	Emma Daumas	EMI
Ortal	"Chacun pense à soi"	Ortal, Saad Tabainet	Warner

==== Final ====
The final took place on 15 March 2005. The show consisted of two parts: in the first part each of the five finalists performed a duet with a well-known artist and in the second part the five contest entries were performed. The winner, "Chacun pense à soi" performed by Ortal, was determined by the combination of public televoting (50%) and a five-member jury panel (50%). The jury panel consisted of Jean-Claude Camus (producer), Dominique Segall (press agency director), Miroslava Brimont (vocal coach), Bertrand Mosca (France 3 programmes director) and Jean-Michel Boris (former artistic director of L'Olympia).

In addition to the performances of the competing entries, Elsa Fayer performed the French Eurovision Song Contest 1977 winning song "L'oiseau et l'enfant" by Marie Myriam as the interval act of the show.

Final – 15 March 2005
R/O	Artist	Duet	R/O	Song	Place
1	Lionel Tim	"Tu es mon autre" (with Lara Fabian)	6	"Je m'envole"	3
2	Ortal	"Au fur et à musure" (with Liane Foly)	7	"Chacun pense à soi"	1
3	Christophe Héraut	"Vivo per lei" (with Hélène Segara)	8	"C'est la vie"	2
4	Marjorie Galluccio	"Si maman si" (with Julie Zenatti)	9	"Casting"	5
5	Karine Trecy	"Dis-lui" (with Lââm)	10	"Laissez moi rêver"	4

== At Eurovision ==
According to Eurovision rules, all nations with the exceptions of the host country, the "Big Four" (France, Germany, Spain and the United Kingdom) and the ten highest placed finishers in the 2004 contest are required to qualify from the semi-final in order to compete for the final; the top ten countries from the semi-final progress to the final. As a member of the "Big 4", France automatically qualified to compete in the final on 21 May 2005. In addition to their participation in the final, France is also required to broadcast and vote in the semi-final on 19 May 2005. During the running order draw for the semi-final and final, France was placed to perform last in position 24 in the final, following the entry from Latvia. Ortal performed the song on stage with five backing vocalists/dancers: Fabien Hannot, Raphael Kaney, Julie Victor, Christelle Chaaban and Marsha Nelzy, and France placed twenty-third in the final, scoring 11 points.

In France, the semi-final was broadcast on France 4 with commentary by Peggy Olmi, while the final was broadcast on France 3 with commentary by Julien Lepers and Guy Carlier, as well as via radio on France Bleu with commentary by Jean-Luc Delarue. France Télévisions appointed Marie Myriam (who won Eurovision for France in 1977) as its spokesperson to announced the French votes during the final.

=== Voting ===
Below is a breakdown of points awarded to France and awarded by France in the semi-final and grand final of the contest. The nation awarded its 12 points to Portugal in the semi-final and to Turkey in the final of the contest.

==== Points awarded to France ====
Points awarded to France (Final)
Score	Country
12 points	
10 points	
8 points	
7 points	
6 points	
5 points	Andorra; Israel
4 points	
3 points	
2 points	
1 point	Albania

==== Points awarded by France ====
Points awarded by France (Semi-final)
Score	Country
12 points	Portugal
10 points	Monaco
8 points	Israel
7 points	Belgium
6 points	Romania
5 points	Moldova
4 points	Hungary
3 points	Poland
2 points	Iceland
1 point	Denmark

Points awarded by France (Final)
Score	Country
12 points	Turkey
10 points	Israel
8 points	Greece
7 points	Malta
6 points	Serbia and Montenegro
5 points	Romania
4 points	Spain
3 points	Hungary
2 points	Moldova
1 point	Albania
