= Switzerland in the Eurovision Song Contest 2005 =

- Eurovision Song Contest 2005
- Participating broadcaster: Swiss Broadcasting Corporation (SRG SSR)
- Country: Switzerland
- Selection process: Internal selection
- Announcement date: Artist: 9 November 2004; Song: 5 March 2005

Competing entry
- Song: "Cool Vibes"
- Artist: Vanilla Ninja
- Songwriters: David Brandes; Jane Tempest; John O'Flynn

Placement
- Semi-final result: Qualified (8th, 114 points)
- Final result: 8th, 128 points

Participation chronology

Switzerland was represented at the Eurovision Song Contest 2005 with the song "Cool Vibes", written by David Brandes, Jane Tempest, and John O'Flynn, and performed by the band Vanilla Ninja. The Swiss participating broadcaster, the Swiss Broadcasting Corporation (SRG SSR), internally selected its entry for the contest in November 2004. "Cool Vibes" was presented to the public as the Swiss song during the show Congratulations - 50 Jahre Eurovision Song Contest on 5 March 2005.

Switzerland competed in the semi-final of the Eurovision Song Contest which took place on 19 May 2005. Performing during the show in position 19, "Cool Vibes" was announced among the top 10 entries of the semi-final and therefore qualified to compete in the final on 21 May. It was later revealed that Switzerland placed eighth out of the 25 participating countries in the semi-final with 114 points. In the final, Switzerland performed in position 22 and placed eighth out of the 24 participating countries, scoring 128 points.

== Background ==
Prior to the 2005 contest, the Swiss Broadcasting Corporation (SRG SSR) had participated in the Eurovision Song Contest representing Switzerland forty-five times since its first entry in 1956. It won that first edition of the contest with the song "Refrain" performed by Lys Assia. Its second victory was achieved in 1988 with the song "Ne partez pas sans moi" performed by Canadian singer Céline Dion. In 2004, Switzerland earned their lowest results of all time, with "Celebrate" performed by Piero Esteriore and the MusicStars placing last in the semi-final without earning a single point.

As part of its duties as participating broadcaster, SRG SSR organises the selection of its entry in the Eurovision Song Contest and broadcasts the event in the country. The broadcaster confirmed its intentions to participate at the 2005 contest on 14 July 2004. Along with its participation confirmation, it also announced that it would internally select its entry for the 2005 contest. Switzerland has selected their entry for the Eurovision Song Contest through both national finals and internal selections in the past. Since 1998, the broadcaster has opted to organize a national final in order to select the Swiss entry.

== Before Eurovision ==
=== Internal selection ===
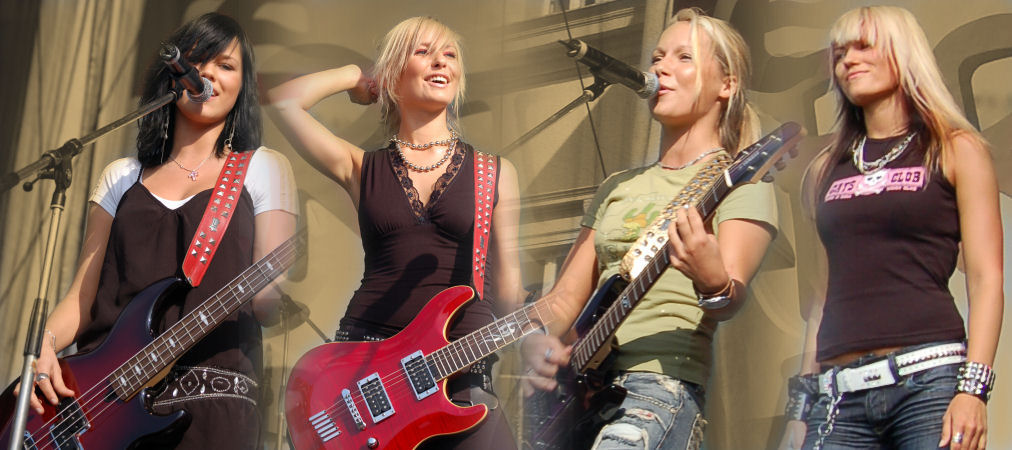
Vanilla Ninja was internally selected to represent Switzerland in 2005

SRG SSR opened a submission period between 14 July 2004 and 15 October 2004 for interested artists and composers to submit their entries. Eligible artists were those that have had television and stage experience (live performances), have made at least one video and have released at least one CD which placed among the top 50 in an official chart. In addition to the public application, the broadcaster was also in contact with individual composers and lyricists as well as the music industry to be involved in the selection process.

On 2 November 2004, Estonian tabloid SL Õhtuleht claimed that the Estonian band Vanilla Ninja had been selected to represent Switzerland in Kyiv, which was subsequently confirmed by SRG SSR on 9 November 2004. Vanilla Ninja had previously attempted to represent Estonia at the Eurovision Song Contest in 2003, placing ninth in the national final Eurolaul 2003 with the song "Club Kung-Fu". It was also announced that their song had been written and produced by David Brandes. Both the artist and song were selected by a jury panel consisting of representatives of the three SRG SSR broadcasters: Swiss-German/Romansh broadcaster Schweizer Fernsehen der deutschen und rätoromanischen Schweiz (SF DRS), Swiss-French broadcaster Télévision Suisse Romande (TSR), and Swiss-Italian broadcaster Televisione svizzera di lingua italiana (TSI).

"Cool Vibes" was presented to the public as the song Vanilla Ninja would perform at the Eurovision Song Contest on 5 March 2005 during the show Congratulations - 50 Jahre Eurovision Song Contest, which celebrated the 50th anniversary of the Eurovision Song Contest. The show was hosted by Sandra Studer and was televised on SF DRS, TSI with Italian commentary by Marco Blaser and TSR with French commentary by Jean-Marc Richard. In addition to the song presentation, former Swiss Eurovision Song Contest entrants appeared during the show as guests: Lys Assia (1956, 1957, and 1958), Paola (1969 and 1980), Peter Reber (1971, 1976, 1979, and 1981), Pepe Lienhard (1977), Francine Jordi (2002), and Piero Esteriore (2004). "Cool Vibes" was written by David Brandes together with Jane Tempest and Bernd Meinunger under the pseudonym John O'Flynn.

== At Eurovision ==
According to Eurovision rules, all nations with the exceptions of the host country, the "Big Four" (France, Germany, Spain and the United Kingdom), and the ten highest placed finishers in the 2004 contest are required to qualify from the semi-final on 19 May 2005 in order to compete for the final on 21 May 2005; the top ten countries from the semi-final progress to the final. On 22 March 2005, an allocation draw was held which determined the running order for the semi-final and Switzerland was set to perform in position 19, following the entry from Andorra and before the entry from Croatia. At the end of the show, Switzerland was announced as having finished in the top 10 and subsequently qualifying for the grand final. It was later revealed that Switzerland placed eighth in the semi-final, receiving a total of 114 points. The draw for the running order for the final was done by the presenters during the announcement of the ten qualifying countries during the semi-final and Switzerland was drawn to perform in position 22, following the entry from Bosnia and Herzegovina and before the entry from Latvia. Switzerland placed eighth in the final, scoring 128 points.

In Switzerland, three broadcasters that form SRG SSR aired both shows of the contest. Sandra Studer (who represented Switzerland in 1991) provided German commentary on SF DRS, Jean-Marc Richard and Marie-Thérèse Porche provided French commentary on TSR, while Daniela Tami and Claudio Lazzarino provided Italian commentary on TSI. SRG SSR appointed Cécile Bähler as its spokesperson to announce the Swiss votes during the final.

=== Voting ===
Below is a breakdown of points awarded to Switzerland and awarded by Switzerland in the semi-final and grand final of the contest. The nation awarded its 12 points to Portugal in the semi-final and to Serbia and Montenegro in the final of the contest.

==== Points awarded to Switzerland ====
Points awarded to Switzerland (Semi-final)
Score	Country
12 points	Estonia
10 points	Finland
8 points	Belarus; Lithuania
7 points	Latvia
6 points	Germany; Iceland
5 points	Cyprus; Poland; Slovenia
4 points	Sweden
3 points	Bulgaria; Croatia; Greece; Hungary; Israel; Macedonia
2 points	Bosnia and Herzegovina; Denmark; Ireland; Monaco; Norway; Portugal; Romania; Russia; Serbia and Montenegro
1 point	Austria; Malta

Points awarded to Switzerland (Final)
Score	Country
12 points	Estonia; Latvia
10 points	Belarus; Finland
8 points	Lithuania; Monaco
7 points	Iceland; Russia
6 points	Poland; Slovenia
5 points	Sweden; Ukraine
4 points	Cyprus; Germany; Portugal
3 points	Croatia; Greece; Hungary; Ireland; Norway
2 points	Israel
1 point	Andorra; Denmark; Malta

==== Points awarded by Switzerland ====
Points awarded by Switzerland (Semi-final)
Score	Country
12 points	Portugal
10 points	Croatia
8 points	Macedonia
7 points	Denmark
6 points	Austria
5 points	Norway
4 points	Romania
3 points	Israel
2 points	Netherlands
1 point	Hungary

Points awarded by Switzerland (Final)
Score	Country
12 points	Serbia and Montenegro
10 points	Albania
8 points	Croatia
7 points	Greece
6 points	Turkey
5 points	Bosnia and Herzegovina
4 points	Spain
3 points	Malta
2 points	Macedonia
1 point	Israel
