= Latvia in the Eurovision Song Contest 2005 =

- Eurovision Song Contest 2005
- Participating broadcaster: Latvijas Televīzija (LTV)
- Country: Latvia
- Selection process: Eirodziesma 2005
- Selection date: 26 February 2005

Competing entry
- Song: "The War Is Not Over"
- Artist: Walters and Kazha
- Songwriters: Mārtiņš Freimanis

Placement
- Semi-final result: Qualified (10th, 85 points)
- Final result: 5th, 153 points

Participation chronology

Latvia was represented at the Eurovision Song Contest 2005 with the song "The War Is Not Over", written by Mārtiņš Freimanis, and performed by Walters and Kazha. The Latvian participating broadcaster, Latvijas Televīzija (LTV), organised the national final Eirodziesma 2005 in order to select its entry for the contest. Twenty songs were selected to compete in the national final, which consisted of three shows: two semi-finals and a final. In the semi-finals on 29 January and 5 February 2005, five entries were selected to advance from each show: three entries selected based on a public televote and two entries selected by a jury panel. Ten songs ultimately qualified to compete in the final on 26 February 2005 where two rounds of public voting selected "The War Is Not Over" performed by Valters and Kaža as the winner. Songwriter Freimanis represented Latvia in 2003 as part of the group F.L.Y.

Latvia competed in the semi-final of the Eurovision Song Contest which took place on 19 May 2005. Performing during the show in position 5, "The War Is Not Over" was announced among the top 10 entries of the semi-final and therefore qualified to compete in the final on 21 May. It was later revealed that Latvia placed tenth out of the 25 participating countries in the semi-final with 85 points. In the final, Latvia performed in position 23 and placed fifth out of the 24 participating countries, scoring 153 points.

== Background ==
Prior to the 2005 contest, Latvijas Televīzija (LTV) had participated in the Eurovision Song Contest representing Latvia five times since its first entry in 2000. It won the contest once in 2002 with the song "I Wanna" performed by Marie N. Following the introduction of semi-finals in 2004, it had failed to qualify to the final with the entry "Dziesma par laimi" performed by Fomins and Kleins.

As part of its duties as participating broadcaster, LTV organises the selection of its entry in the Eurovision Song Contest and broadcasts the event in the country. The broadcaster confirmed its intentions to participate at the 2005 contest on 4 September 2004. LTV has selected its entries for the contest through a national final. Since its debut in 2000, the broadcaster had organised the selection show Eirodziesma. Along with its participation confirmation, the broadcaster announced that it would organise Eirodziesma 2005 in order to select its entry for the 2005 contest.

== Before Eurovision ==
=== Eirodziesma 2005 ===
Eirodziesma 2005 was the sixth edition of Eirodziesma, the music competition organised by LTV to select its entries for the Eurovision Song Contest. The competition commenced on 29 January 2005 and concluded with a final on 26 February 2005. All shows in the competition were hosted by Elvis Jansons and Ija Circene and broadcast on LTV1.

==== Format ====
The format of the competition consisted of three shows: two semi-finals and a final. The two semi-finals, held on 29 January and 5 February 2005, each featured ten competing entries from which five advanced to the final from each show. The final, held on 26 February 2005, selected the Latvian entry for Kyiv from the remaining ten entries over two rounds of voting: the first round selected the top three songs and the second round (superfinal) selected the winner. Results during the semi-final shows were determined by a jury panel and votes from the public. The songs first faced a public vote where the top three entries qualified. The jury then selected an additional two qualifiers from the remaining entries to proceed in the competition. In the final, a public vote exclusively determined which entry would be the winner. Viewers were able to vote via telephone or SMS.

==== Competing entries ====
Artists and songwriters were able to submit their entries to the broadcaster between 10 September 2004 and 16 November 2004. 64 entries were submitted at the conclusion of the submission period. A jury panel appointed by LTV evaluated the submitted songs and selected twenty entries for the competition. The jury panel consisted of Alar Kotkas (Estonian composer), Amberlife (Lithuanian musician and songwriter), Michael Cederberg (representative of Sveriges Radio P3), Ramona Forsström (Promotion Manager of International Repertoire at EMI Finland), Edward van de Vendel (Dutch poet and lyricist), Jānis Lūsēns (composer), members of the LTV Eurovision team and music directors at LTV. The twenty competing artists and songs were announced during a press conference on 2 December 2004. On 6 January 2005, LTV announced that the song "Your Love Is on My Side" would be performed by the duo Creem instead of Lily.

Artist	Song	Songwriter(s)
4.elements	"What About Your Heart"	Lauris Reiniks
Agnese and Intars	"Sing It! Swing It!"	Boriss Rezņiks, Ēriks Balodis
Amber	"Dance Together"	Aija Vītoliņa
C-Stones	"L.O.V.E."	Līva Boitmane, Zane Beļska, Kristians Korns, Olafs Bergmanis
Chilli	"Shut Up"	Mārtiņš Freimanis, Freddy Kirstein
Creem	"Your Love Is on My Side"	Yana Kay
Ella and Marizo	"Sing With Me"	Elīna Fūrmane, Māris Rumba
Flash	"In Your Arms"	Artūrs Palkēvičs, Iveta Priede
Gunārs Kalniņš	"Ja nu"	Gunārs Kalniņš, Madara Celma
Iedomu spārni	"No Way Back"	Jānis Dreiškins, Laura Veisa
Igeta	"In a Desert"	Igeta Gaiķe, Agris Palkavnieks
Ksenija	"In the Heat of the Night"	Tommy Kasa, Kent Wennman, Uģis Tirzītis
Madara Celma	"I Might Be the One"	Madara Celma
Marta	"Loving, Missing, Crying"	Gints Stankevičs, Tatjana Timčuka
Morning Kids	"Your Girlfriend"	Romāns Faļkenšteins, Dina Faļkenšteina
Nicol	"A Woman to Love"	Viktorija Zeļinska
Prego	"We Are One"	Ivo Grīsniņš Grīslis, Olafs Vēveris
Santa Zapacka	"Wandering Words"	Santa Zapacka, Daiga Rūtenberga
Valters and Kaža	"The War Is Not Over"	Mārtiņš Freimanis
Z-Scars	"To Touch, to Breathe, to Love"	Andris Kivičs

==== Semi-finals ====
The two semi-finals took place on 29 January and 5 February 2005. The live portion of the show was held at the LTV Studio 1 in Riga where the artists awaited the results while their performances, which were filmed earlier on 23 January 2005, were screened. In each semi-final ten acts competed and five entries qualified to the final. The competing entries first faced a public vote where the top three songs advanced; an additional two qualifiers were then selected from the remaining seven entries by the jury.

Public vote qualifier Jury qualifier

Semi-final 1 – 29 January 2005
R/O	Artist	Song	Jury	Televote		Result
R/O	Artist	Song	Jury	Votes	Rank	Result
1	Igeta	"In a Desert"	8	1,341	5	—N/a
2	Morning Kids	"Your Girlfriend"	10	762	9	—N/a
3	Santa Zapacka	"Wandering Words"	9	1,177	6	—N/a
4	4.elements	"What About Your Heart"	7	1,004	7	—N/a
5	Gunārs Kalniņš	"Ja nu"	5	904	8	—N/a
6	Prego	"We Are One"	6	1,740	2	Qualified
7	Ella and Marizo	"Sing With Me"	3	1,692	4	Qualified
8	Nicol	"A Woman to Love"	1	1,718	3	Qualified
9	Flash	"In Your Arms"	2	692	10	Qualified
10	Iedomu spārni	"No Way Back"	4	1,986	1	Qualified

Semi-final 2 – 5 February 2005
R/O	Artist	Song	Jury	Televote		Result
R/O	Artist	Song	Jury	Votes	Rank	Result
1	Amber	"Dance Together"	2	369	10	Qualified
2	Z-Scars	"To Touch, to Breathe, to Love"	8	676	9	—N/a
3	Marta	"Loving, Missing, Crying"	3	2,150	5	Qualified
4	Madara Celma	"I Might Be the One"	6	1,119	8	—N/a
5	C-Stones	"L.O.V.E."	7	1,534	6	—N/a
6	Chilli	"Shut Up"	5	1,217	7	—N/a
7	Ksenija	"In the Heat of the Night"	9	5,693	2	Qualified
8	Valters and Kaža	"The War Is Not Over"	1	5,902	1	Qualified
9	Agnese and Intars	"Sing It! Swing It!"	4	4,466	3	Qualified
10	Creem	"Your Love Is On My Side"	10	2,345	4	—N/a

==== Final ====
The final took place at the Olympic Center in Ventspils on 26 February 2005. The ten entries that qualified from the preceding two semi-finals competed and the winner was selected over two rounds of public televoting. In the first round, the top three songs advanced to the second round, the superfinal. In the superfinal, "The War Is Not Over" performed by Valters and Kaža was declared the winner. In addition to the performances of the competing entries, guest performers included singers Amberlife and Ladybird, the group re:public, the band Symbolic with Niks Matvejevs, Arnis Mednis (who represented Latvia in 2001) together with the group Odis, F.L.Y. (who represented Latvia in 2003) and Fomins and Kleins (who represented Latvia in 2004).

Final – 26 February 2005
R/O	Artist	Song	Televote	Place
1	Prego	"We Are One"	1,844	6
2	Valters and Kaža	"The War Is Not Over"	—	—
3	Ella and Marizo	"Sing With Me"	1,790	7
4	Flash	"In Your Arms"	622	9
5	Ksenija	"In the Heat of the Night"	—	—
6	Agnese and Intars	"Sing It! Swing It!"	—	—
7	Iedomu spārni	"No Way Back"	2,344	5
8	Nicol	"A Woman to Love"	1,546	8
9	Amber	"Dance Together"	486	10
10	Marta	"Loving, Missing, Crying"	6,977	4

Superfinal – 26 February 2005
R/O	Artist	Song	Televote	Place
1	Valters and Kaža	"The War Is Not Over"	28,214	1
2	Ksenija	"In the Heat of the Night"	8,308	3
3	Agnese and Intars	"Sing It! Swing It!"	20,318	2

== At Eurovision ==
According to Eurovision rules, all nations with the exceptions of the host country, the "Big Four" (France, Germany, Spain and the United Kingdom), and the ten highest placed finishers in the 2004 contest are required to qualify from the semi-final on 19 May 2005 in order to compete for the final on 21 May 2005; the top ten countries from the semi-final progress to the final. On 22 March 2005, a special allocation draw was held which determined the running order for the semi-final and Latvia was set to perform in position 5, following the entry from Moldova and before the entry from Monaco. Latvian Sign Language was also used by Walters and Kazha for the performance, making it the first Eurovision entry to feature a sign language. At the end of the show, Latvia was announced as having finished in the top 10 and subsequently qualifying for the grand final. It was later revealed that Latvia placed tenth in the semi-final, receiving a total of 85 points. The draw for the running order for the final was done by the presenters during the announcement of the ten qualifying countries during the semi-final and Latvia was drawn to perform in position 23, following the entry from Switzerland and before the entry from France. Latvia placed fifth in the final, scoring 153 points.

The semi-final and the final were broadcast in Latvia on LTV1 with all shows featuring commentary by Kārlis Streips. LTV appointed Marie N as its spokesperson to announce the Latvian votes during the final.

=== Voting ===
Below is a breakdown of points awarded to Latvia and awarded by Latvia in the semi-final and grand final of the contest. The nation awarded its 12 points to Estonia in the semi-final and to Switzerland in the final of the contest.

==== Points awarded to Latvia ====
Points awarded to Latvia (Semi-final)
Score	Country
12 points	Lithuania; Malta
10 points	Estonia
8 points	
7 points	Belarus; Croatia
6 points	Ireland; Israel; Slovenia
5 points	Denmark
4 points	Portugal
3 points	Norway
2 points	Cyprus; Iceland; Ukraine
1 point	Russia

Points awarded to Latvia (Final)
Score	Country
12 points	Ireland; Lithuania; Moldova
10 points	Andorra; Estonia; Malta
8 points	Norway
7 points	Croatia; Germany; Slovenia
6 points	Belarus; Denmark; Israel; Portugal; United Kingdom
5 points	Belgium; Russia
4 points	Finland; Poland
3 points	Iceland; Sweden
2 points	
1 point	Cyprus; Greece; Hungary; Ukraine

==== Points awarded by Latvia ====
Points awarded by Latvia (Semi-final)
Score	Country
12 points	Estonia
10 points	Moldova
8 points	Lithuania
7 points	Switzerland
6 points	Norway
5 points	Hungary
4 points	Croatia
3 points	Belarus
2 points	Denmark
1 point	Poland

Points awarded by Latvia (Final)
Score	Country
12 points	Switzerland
10 points	Russia
8 points	Moldova
7 points	Croatia
6 points	Norway
5 points	Malta
4 points	Denmark
3 points	Hungary
2 points	Israel
1 point	Serbia and Montenegro
