= United Kingdom in the Eurovision Song Contest 2005 =

United Kingdom participation in the 2005 Eurovision song contest

- Eurovision Song Contest 2005
- Participating broadcaster: British Broadcasting Corporation (BBC)
- Country: United Kingdom
- Selection process: Eurovision: Making Your Mind Up 2005
- Selection date: 5 March 2005

Competing entry
- Song: "Touch My Fire"
- Artist: Javine
- Songwriters: Javine Hylton; John Themis; Jonathan Shalit

Placement
- Final result: 22nd, 18 points

Participation chronology

The United Kingdom was represented at the Eurovision Song Contest 2005 with the song "Touch My Fire", written by Javine Hylton, John Themis, and Jonathan Shalit, and performed by Javine. The British participating broadcaster, the British Broadcasting Corporation (BBC), organised a public selection process to determine its entry for the contest, Eurovision: Making Your Mind Up 2005. Five acts competed in the national final and the winner was selected entirely through a public vote.

As a member of the "Big Four", the United Kingdom automatically qualified to compete in the final of the Eurovision Song Contest. Performing in position 2, the United Kingdom placed 22nd out of the 24 participating countries with 18 points.

== Background ==
Prior to the 2005 contest, the British Broadcasting Corporation (BBC) had participated in the Eurovision Song Contest representing the United Kingdom forty-seven times. Thus far, it has won the contest five times: in 1967 with the song "Puppet on a String" performed by Sandie Shaw, in 1969 with the song "Boom Bang-a-Bang" performed by Lulu, in 1976 with "Save Your Kisses for Me" performed by Brotherhood of Man, in 1981 with the song "Making Your Mind Up" performed by Bucks Fizz, and in 1997 with the song "Love Shine a Light" performed by Katrina and the Waves. To this point, the nation is noted for having finished as the runner-up in a record fifteen contests. Up to and including 1998, it had only twice finished outside the top 10, in 1978 and in 1987. Since 1999, the year in which the rule was abandoned that songs must be performed in one of the official languages of the country participating, it has had less success, thus far only finishing within the top ten once: in 2002 with the song "Come Back" performed by Jessica Garlick. In 2004, "Hold Onto Our Love" performed by James Fox finished in sixteenth place out of twenty-four competing entries.

As part of its duties as participating broadcaster, the BBC organises the selection of its entry in the Eurovision Song Contest and broadcasts the event in the country. The broadcaster announced that it would participate in the 2005 contest on 28 July 2004. The BBC has traditionally organised a national final featuring a competition among several artists and songs to choose its entry for Eurovision. For its 2005 entry, the broadcaster announced that a national final involving a public vote would be held to select the entry.

== Before Eurovision ==
=== Eurovision: Making Your Mind Up 2005 ===
Eurovision: Making Your Mind Up 2005 was the national final developed by the BBC in order to select its entry for the Eurovision Song Contest 2005. Five acts competed in a televised show on 5 March 2005 held at the BBC Television Centre in London and hosted by Terry Wogan and Natasha Kaplinsky. The winner was selected entirely through a public vote. The show was broadcast on BBC One. The national final was watched by 7.5 million viewers in the United Kingdom.

==== Competing entries ====
The BBC collaborated with record label Sony Music to select five finalists to compete in the national final. Entries were provided to Sony Music and the BBC by music industry experts including writers and producers, while an additional five songs were provided by the British Academy of Songwriters, Composers and Authors (BASCA) which ran a songwriting competition amongst its members. The five competing songs were announced on 1 March 2005. Among the competing artists was Gina G, who represented the United Kingdom in 1996 .

Artist	Song	Songwriter(s)
Andy Scott-Lee	"Guardian Angel"	Lee Ryan; Rob Persaud
Gina G	"Flashback"	Gina G; Zuriani; Richard Adlam
Javine	"Touch My Fire"	Javine Hylton; John Themis; Jonathan Shalit
Katie Price	"Not Just Anybody"	Pete Glenister; Deni Lew
Tricolore	"Brand New Day"	Jon Cohen; Jem Sharples; Stuart Pendred; Scott Ciscon

==== Final ====
Five acts competed in the televised final on 5 March 2005. In addition to their performances, guest performers included Ruslana, who won Eurovision for Ukraine in 2004 with the song "Wild Dances", and Sonia, who represented the United Kingdom in 1993 with the song "Better the Devil You Know".

A panel of experts provided feedback regarding the songs during the show. The panel consisted of Bruno Tonioli (choreographer, dancer and television personality), Jonathan Ross (television and radio presenter, actor, comedian and producer), Natalie Cassidy (actress) and Paddy O'Connell (television and radio presenter). A public vote consisting of televoting and online voting, which registered over 1 million votes, selected the winner. A public vote consisting of televoting via phone and SMS as well as online voting selected the winner. Televotes cast via landline phones were divided into seven regions in the United Kingdom with each region alongside the results of the online vote awarding points as follows: 2, 4, 6, 8 and 12 points. Televotes cast via mobile phones and SMS were also converted to points and awarded based on the percentage each song achieved. For example, if a song gained 10% of the mobile and SMS votes, then that entry would be awarded 10 points. The spokespersons for the online and mobile/SMS votes were Ruslana and Sandie Shaw, respectively. After all points were combined, "Touch My Fire" performed by Javine was the winner.

R/O	Artist	Song	Televote		Online vote	Total	Place
R/O	Artist	Song	Landline	Mobile	Online vote	Total	Place
1	Javine	"Touch My Fire"	80	30	6	116	1
2	Tricolore	"Brand New Day"	36	18	4	58	4
3	Gina G	"Flashback"	14	4	2	20	5
4	Andy Scott-Lee	"Guardian Angel"	34	19	8	61	3
5	Katie Price	"Not Just Anybody"	60	29	12	101	2

Detailed Regional Televoting Results
R/O	Song	Northern Ireland	Northern England	Scotland	Wales	South West England	Midlands	South East England	Total
1	"Touch My Fire"	12	12	8	12	12	12	12	80
2	"Brand New Day"	4	4	4	6	6	6	6	36
3	"Flashback"	2	2	2	2	2	2	2	14
4	"Guardian Angel"	6	6	6	4	4	4	4	34
5	"Not Just Anybody"	8	8	12	8	8	8	8	60
Spokespersons
Northern Ireland – Zöe Salmon; Northern England – Stuart Hall; Scotland – Justin Ryan and Colin McAllister; Wales – James Fox; South West England – Sharron Davies; Midlands – Denise Lewis; South East England – Fearne Cotton

===== 12 points =====
N.	Song	Regions giving 12 points
6	Touch My Fire	Midlands, Northern England, Northern Ireland, South West England, South East England, Wales
1	Not Just Anybody	Scotland

== At Eurovision ==
According to Eurovision rules, all nations with the exceptions of the host country, the "Big Four" (France, Germany, Spain, and the United Kingdom) and the ten highest placed finishers in the 2004 contest are required to qualify from the semi-final in order to compete for the final; the top ten countries from the semi-final progress to the final. As a member of the "Big Four", the United Kingdom automatically qualified to compete in the final on 21 May 2005. In addition to their participation in the final, the United Kingdom is also required to broadcast and vote in the semi-final on 19 May 2005. During the running order draw for the semi-final and final, the United Kingdom was placed to perform in position 2 in the final, following the entry from Hungary and before the entry from Malta. The United Kingdom placed twenty-second in the final, scoring 18 points.

In the United Kingdom, the semi-final was broadcast on BBC Three with commentary by Paddy O'Connell, while the final was televised on BBC One with commentary by Terry Wogan and broadcast on BBC Radio 2 with commentary by Ken Bruce. The BBC appointed Cheryl Baker (who won the Eurovision for the United Kingdom in 1981 as part of the group Bucks Fizz) as its spokesperson to announce the British votes during the final.

=== Voting ===
Below is a breakdown of points awarded to the United Kingdom and awarded by the United Kingdom in the semi-final and grand final of the contest. The nation awarded its 12 points to Ireland in the semi-final and to Greece in the final of the contest.

==== Points awarded to the United Kingdom ====
Points awarded to the United Kingdom (Final)
Score	Country
12 points	
10 points	
8 points	Ireland
7 points	
6 points	
5 points	Cyprus
4 points	Malta
3 points	
2 points	
1 point	Turkey

==== Points awarded by the United Kingdom ====
Points awarded by the United Kingdom (Semi-final)
Score	Country
12 points	Ireland
10 points	Denmark
8 points	Romania
7 points	Norway
6 points	Israel
5 points	Moldova
4 points	Lithuania
3 points	Iceland
2 points	Netherlands
1 point	Hungary

Points awarded by the United Kingdom (Final)
Score	Country
12 points	Greece
10 points	Malta
8 points	Denmark
7 points	Israel
6 points	Latvia
5 points	Norway
4 points	Bosnia and Herzegovina
3 points	Cyprus
2 points	Moldova
1 point	Turkey
