= Norway in the Eurovision Song Contest 2005 =

- Eurovision Song Contest 2005
- Participating broadcaster: Norsk rikskringkasting (NRK)
- Country: Norway
- Selection process: Melodi Grand Prix 2005
- Selection date: 5 March 2005

Competing entry
- Song: "In My Dreams"
- Artist: Wig Wam
- Songwriters: Trond "Teeny" Holter

Placement
- Semi-final result: Qualified (6th, 164 points)
- Final result: 9th, 125 points

Participation chronology

Norway was represented at the Eurovision Song Contest 2005 with the song "In My Dreams", written by Trond "Teeny" Holter, and performed by the band Wig Wam. The Norwegian participating broadcaster, Norsk rikskringkasting (NRK), organised the national final Melodi Grand Prix 2005 in order to select its entry for the contest. Eight entries competed in a show that took place on 5 March 2005 and the winner was determined over two rounds of public televoting. The top four entries in the first round of voting advanced to the competition's second round—the Gold Final. In the second round of public televoting, "In My Dreams" performed by Wig Wam was selected as the winner with 75,667 votes.

Norway competed in the semi-final of the Eurovision Song Contest which took place on 19 May 2005. Performing during the show in position 13, "In My Dreams" was announced among the top 10 entries of the semi-final and therefore qualified to compete in the final on 21 May. It was later revealed that Norway placed sixth out of the 25 participating countries in the semi-final with 164 points. In the final, Norway performed in position 5 and placed ninth out of the 24 participating countries, scoring 125 points.

== Background ==
Prior to the 2005 contest, Norsk rikskringkasting (NRK) had participated in the Eurovision Song Contest representing Norway 43 times since its first entry in 1960. It had won the contest on two occasions: in 1985 with the song "La det swinge" performed by Bobbysocks!, and in 1995 with the song "Nocturne" performed by Secret Garden. It also had the two distinctions of having finished last in the Eurovision final more than any other country and for having the most nul points (zero points) in the contest, the latter being a record the nation shared together with Austria. The country had finished last 10 times and had failed to score a point during four contests.

As part of its duties as participating broadcaster, NRK organises the selection of its entry in the Eurovision Song Contest and broadcasts the event in the country. The broadcaster confirmed their intentions to participate at the 2005 contest on 8 September 2004. NRK has traditionally organised the national final Melodi Grand Prix to select its entry for the contest in all but one of its participation. Along with its participation confirmation, the broadcaster revealed details regarding their selection procedure and announced the organization of Melodi Grand Prix 2005 in order to select its 2005 entry.

== Before Eurovision ==
=== Melodi Grand Prix 2005 ===
Melodi Grand Prix 2005 was the 43rd edition of the Norwegian national final Melodi Grand Prix organised by NRK to select its entry for the Eurovision Song Contest 2005. The show took place on 5 March 2005 at the Oslo Spektrum in Oslo, hosted by Ivar Dyrhaug and televised on NRK1. The national final was watched by 1.352 million viewers in Norway with a market share of 86%, making it the most watched Melodi Grand Prix final since 1996.

==== Competing entries ====
Artists and composers were directly invited by NRK to compete in the national final. Eight songs were selected for the competition and the competing acts and songs were revealed between 1 November 2004 and 15 February 2005. Among the competing artists were former Norwegian Eurovision Song Contest entrants Jahn Teigen (who represented Norway in 1978, in 1982 –alongside Anita Skorgan– and in 1983), and Tor Endresen –member of Seppo– (who represented Norway in 1997). The artists were presented during the NRK1 programme Memo between 14 February and 4 March, with one artist being featured in each broadcast.

==== Final ====
Eight songs competed during the final on 5 March 2005. The winner was selected over two rounds of public televoting. In the first round, the top four entries were selected to proceed to the second round, the Gold Final. In the Gold Final, the results of the public televote were revealed by Norway's five regions and led to the victory of "In My Dreams" performed by Wig Wam with 75,667 votes. In addition to the performances of the competing entries, the interval act featured Bobbysocks! performing their entry "La det swinge", who won Eurovision for Norway in 1985.

Final – 5 March 2005
R/O	Artist	Song	Songwriter(s)	Result
1	Jorun Erdal	"I Am Rock 'n' Roll"	Claes Andreasson, Torbjörn Wasenius, Tommy Denander	Advanced
2	Cheezy Keys	"Feel the Beat"	Kim Arne Hagen, Hans Petter Moen, Morten Bergheim	Advanced
3	Andreea	"Kingdom Come"	Tom Steinar-Hansen, Ole Henrik Antonsen, Lars Aass	—N/a
4	Kathrine Strugstad	"Velvet Blue"	Arve Furset, Gerard James Borg	—N/a
5	Jahn Teigen	"My Heart Is My Home"	Jahn Teigen, Anita Skorgan, Jan Vincents Johannessen	Advanced
6	Blissed	"You Are the One"	Mikael Gunnerås, Magnus Lindquist, Magdalena Lindström	—N/a
7	Seppo	"Can You Hear Me"	Tor Endresen, Are Selheim	—N/a
8	Wig Wam	"In My Dreams"	Trond "Teeny" Holter	Advanced

Gold Final – 5 March 2005
R/O	Artist	Song	Central Norway	Western Norway	Northern Norway	Southern Norway	Eastern Norway	Total	Place
1	Jorun Erdal	"I Am Rock 'n' Roll"	10,127	12,292	4,740	9,774	27,220	64,153	2
2	Cheezy Keys	"Feel the Beat"	6,906	9,113	4,020	8,086	23,610	51,735	3
3	Jahn Teigen	"My Heart Is My Home"	5,242	8,481	3,865	8,550	21,888	48,026	4
4	Wig Wam	"In My Dreams"	10,064	11,928	5,744	13,548	34,383	75,667	1

== At Eurovision ==
According to Eurovision rules, all nations with the exceptions of the host country, the "Big Four" (France, Germany, Spain and the United Kingdom), and the ten highest placed finishers in the 2004 contest are required to qualify from the semi-final on 19 May 2005 in order to compete for the final on 21 May 2005; the top ten countries from the semi-final progress to the final. On 22 March 2005, an allocation draw was held which determined the running order for the semi-final and Norway was set to perform in position 13, following the entry from Estonia and before the entry from Romania. At the end of the semi-final, Norway was announced as having finished in the top 10 and subsequently qualifying for the grand final. It was later revealed that Norway placed sixth in the semi-final, receiving a total of 164 points. The draw for the running order for the final was done by the presenters during the announcement of the ten qualifying countries during the semi-final and Norway was drawn to perform in position 5, following the entry from Romania and before the entry from Turkey. Norway placed ninth in the final, scoring 125 points.

In Norway, the semi-final and the final were broadcast on NRK1 with commentary by Jostein Pedersen. The final was also broadcast via radio on NRK P1. NRK appointed Ingvild Helljesen as its spokesperson to announce the Norwegian votes during the final.

=== Voting ===
Below is a breakdown of points awarded to Norway and awarded by Norway in the semi-final and grand final of the contest. The nation awarded its 12 points to Denmark in the semi-final and the final of the contest.

==== Points awarded to Norway ====
Points awarded to Norway (Semi-final)
Score	Country
12 points	Denmark; Finland; Iceland
10 points	Ireland
8 points	Moldova; Sweden
7 points	Bosnia and Herzegovina; Israel; Poland; Romania; United Kingdom
6 points	Estonia; Latvia; Lithuania; Ukraine
5 points	Belarus; Switzerland
4 points	Cyprus; Greece; Serbia and Montenegro
3 points	Malta; Slovenia
2 points	Albania; Austria; Belgium; Bulgaria; Macedonia; Netherlands; Turkey
1 point	Portugal

Points awarded to Norway (Final)
Score	Country
12 points	Denmark; Finland; Iceland
10 points	
8 points	Estonia; Poland; Sweden
7 points	
6 points	Latvia; Ukraine
5 points	Lithuania; Malta; United Kingdom
4 points	Belarus; Greece; Ireland; Slovenia
3 points	Belgium; Bosnia and Herzegovina; Cyprus; Moldova; Spain
2 points	Andorra; Serbia and Montenegro
1 point	Bulgaria; Israel; Netherlands

==== Points awarded by Norway ====
Points awarded by Norway (Semi-final)
Score	Country
12 points	Denmark
10 points	Finland
8 points	Iceland
7 points	Romania
6 points	Hungary
5 points	Poland
4 points	Croatia
3 points	Latvia
2 points	Switzerland
1 point	Moldova

Points awarded by Norway (Final)
Score	Country
12 points	Denmark
10 points	Malta
8 points	Latvia
7 points	Bosnia and Herzegovina
6 points	Romania
5 points	Israel
4 points	Greece
3 points	Switzerland
2 points	Croatia
1 point	Sweden
