= Marko Tomasović (composer) =

Croatian composer and songwriter (born 1976)

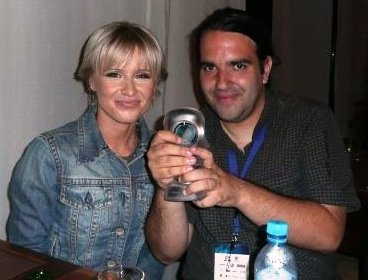
- With Danijela Martinović after winning the prize on Croatian Radio Festival in 2008

Background information
- Born: 18 May 1976 (age 48); Zagreb, SR Croatia, SFR Yugoslavia
- Origin: Zagreb, Croatia
- Genres: Pop, pop rock, rock, world music, blues
- Occupation(s): composer, songwriter
- Instrument: piano
- Years active: 1999–present

Marko Tomasović (born 18 May 1976) is a Croatian composer and songwriter. He has composed and written more than 300 songs. His work has covered various genres. Marko is a member of Croatian Composers' Society, and he was listed as one of the 10 most performed authors in Croatia in 2004.

== Early life and career ==
He was born on 18 May 1976 in Zagreb, Croatia where he lived most of his life. He grew up listening to artists like Roxette, Bryan Adams, Bon Jovi, Scorpions and Cher.

In 1994, Ladislav Račić gave him a chance to teach music at Rock Academia in Zagreb. Two years later, he had additional training with Professor Vanja Lisak. Lisak recommended Marko to his colleague Zdenka Kovačiček and shortly after that they collaborated.

He worked on three Zdenka's CDs, and they won the Zagrebfest in 2000 and Zadarfest in 2001 for the song "Možda ni ne osjećam kraj" (Maybe I don't even feel the end).

Marko points out the song "To nisam bila ja" (That was not me) reminds him of his musical idols.

For the vocal performance in the album "Ja živim svoj san" (I am living my dream) with arrangements of Duško Mandić, Zdenka wins the best singer in Croatia in 2001 at the PORIN Awards.

Entertainment manager Boris Šuput discovered him for his talent in writing pop songs and the collaboration lasted for 6 years. It resulted with hits like "Uzmi me", "Hello", "Baby", "Ljubila sam kao mala", and "Jedna noć", all performed by Šuput's daughter Maja and her group named Enjoy. Šuput sent Marko to some singers from Croatian and Slovenian music scene. His first major opportunity was given by Marina Tomašević with the song "Ja sam tvoja žena" on Croatia in the Eurovision Song Contest (Dora) in 1999. Later, Marina's whole album was named after that song.

With the help of Vladimir Mihaljek, at the Croatian Radio Festival in 2001, he was present with 13 different songs. It earned him a nomination for Guinness.

He also worked with other Croatian singers like Emilija Kokić in 2002, Emina Arapovic in 2007, and Lidija Bačić in 2008.

== Other endeavors ==
=== Band-aid ===
While he was serving civil service for children in Zagreb (known as "Nazorova"), he was dedicated to humanitarian activities. He wrote songs like "Još ima dobrih ljudi" (There are still good people) and "Samo se srcem dobro vidi" (Only with heart you see good) for the Croatian Band Aid.
