= Zadarfest =

Music festival in Croatia

Zadarfest is a music festival held annually since 1993 in Zadar, Croatia. In 2010, it was held in the Višnjik Hall, but was criticized for lack of appeal to the audience. The 2011 edition was moved to Kukljica on a nearby island, but was plagued by bad weather and attendance issues as well.

The festival gives out several awards, the highest being the Grand Prix.

== Festival winners ==
- 1993 – Gibonni with "Život me umorio"
- 1994 – Gibonni with "Dvije duše"
- 1995 – Zoran Jelenković with "Ima Boga"
- 1996 – Petar Grašo and "Trebam nekoga"
- 1997 –
- 1998 –
- 1999 – Vanna with "Daj mi jedan dobar razlog" and Mladen Grdović with "Vitar nek' puše"
- 2000 – Vanna with "Pomozi mi sad" and Zoran Jelenković with "Mjesec je žut"
- 2001 – Vanna with "Više nisi moj"
- 2002 – Doris Dragovic with "Nije mi vrime", Tomislav Bralić with "Ispod tvoje boloture" and Giuliano with "Padam na koljena"
- 2003 – Vesna Pisarović with "Ljubomora"
- 2004 –
- 2005 –
