= Sweden in the Eurovision Song Contest 2005 =

- Eurovision Song Contest 2005
- Participating broadcaster: Sveriges Television (SVT)
- Country: Sweden
- Selection process: Melodifestivalen 2005
- Selection date: 12 March 2005

Competing entry
- Song: "Las Vegas"
- Artist: Martin Stenmarck
- Songwriters: Tim Larsson; Tobias Lundgren; Johan Fransson; Niklas Edberger

Placement
- Final result: 19th, 30 points

Participation chronology

Sweden was represented at the Eurovision Song Contest 2005 with the song "Las Vegas", written by Tim Larsson, Tobias Lundgren, Johan Fransson, and Niklas Edberger, and performed by Martin Stenmarck. The Swedish participating broadcaster, Sveriges Television (SVT), selected its entry through Melodifestivalen 2005.

== Before Eurovision ==
=== Melodifestivalen 2005 ===
Sveriges Television (SVT) selected its entry in the Eurovision Song Contest 2005 through Melodifestivalen 2005. Four heats and one "second chance" round were broadcast to decide the line-up for the national final in Sweden. As in recent years the qualifying heats were held across Sweden. The Melodifestival started out in Gothenburg and travelled through Linköping, Skellefteå, and Växjö before the final. The final was won by Martin Stenmarck with his song "Las Vegas", which was written and composed by Niklas Edberger, Johan Fransson, Tim Larsson and Tobias Lundgren. Nanne, who was the favourite of televoters, came second, as she did not receive enough points from the 11 juries. This caused much controversy in Sweden.

==== Heats and Second Chance round ====
- The first heat took place on 21 February 2005 and was presented by Alexandra Pascalidou and Shan Atci. "Att älska dig" performed by Shirley Clamp and "Ödet var min väg" performed by Nordman qualified directly to the final, while "Alla flickor" performed by Linda Bengtzing and "Alcastar" performed by Alcazar advanced to the Second Chance round. "Var mig nära" performed by Cecilia Vennersten, "My Number One" performed by Papa Dee, "Invisible People" performed by The Wallstones, and "Refrain, Refrain" performed by Pay TV were eliminated from the contest.
- The second heat took place on 28 February 2005 and was presented by Erik Haag and Henrik Schyffert. "Higher Ground" performed by Sanne Salomonsen and "Du och jag mot världen" performed by Fredrik Kempe and Sanna Nielsen qualified directly to the final, while "Med hjärtats egna ord" performed by Josefin Nilsson and "Roma" performed by Cameron Cartio advanced to the Second Chance round. "Jenny" performed by Camilla Brinck, "Big Up" performed by Group Avalon, "Vad du än trodde så trodde du fel" performed by Arja Saijonmaa, and "Gone" performed by Bodies Without Organs were eliminated from the contest.
- The third heat took place on 6 March 2005 and was presented by Johanna Westman and Markoolio. "Las Vegas" performed by Martin Stenmarck and "Vi kan gunga" performed by Jimmy Jansson qualified directly to the final, while "Wherever You Go" performed by Nana and "Nothing at All" performed by LaGaylia Frazier advanced to the Second Chance round. "Lovin' Your Feen" performed by Kwanzaa, "Rain" performed by Josef, "We Got It All" performed by K2 feat. Alannah Myles, and "Om natten" performed by Jessica Folcker were eliminated from the contest.
- The fourth heat took place on 13 March 2005 and was presented by Kayo Shekoni and Michael Leijnegard. "Håll om mig" performed by Nanne Grönvall and "A Different Kind of Love" performed by Caroline Wennergren qualified directly to the final, while "As If Tomorrow Will Never Come" performed by Katrina and the Nameless and "Långt bortom tid och rum" performed by Mathias Holmgren advanced to the Second Chance round. "Så nära" performed by Anne-Lie Rydé, "One Step Closer" performed by B-Boys International feat. Paul M, "Ready for Me" performed by Rickard Engfors feat. Katarina Fallholm, and "Hörde änglarna viska ditt namn" performed by Date were eliminated from the contest.
- The Second Chance round (Andra chansen) took place on 14 March 2005 and was presented by Annika Jankell. "Alcastar" performed by Alcazar and "Alla flickor" performed by Linda Bengtzing qualified to the final.

==== Final ====
The final took place on 20 March 2005 at the Globe Arena in Stockholm and was presented by Jill Johnson and Mark Levengood.

R/O	Artist	Song	Jury	Televote	Total	Place
1	Martin Stenmarck	"Las Vegas"	102	110	212	1
2	Linda Bengtzing	"Alla flickor"	15	0	15	9
3	Nordman	"Ödet var min väg"	4	11	15	9
4	Shirley Clamp	"Att älska dig"	86	44	130	4
5	Sanne Salomonsen	"Higher Ground"	35	0	35	7
6	Caroline Wennergren	"A Different Kind of Love"	28	88	116	5
7	Alcazar	"Alcastar"	69	66	135	3
8	Jimmy Jansson	"Vi kan gunga"	27	22	49	6
9	Fredrik Kempe and Sanna Nielsen	"Du och jag mot världen"	30	0	30	8
10	Nanne Grönvall	"Håll om mig"	77	132	209	2

== At Eurovision ==
Martin automatically qualified for the Kyiv final (thanks to Lena Philipsson's 5th place result in the 2004 Contest), where he performed 14th. The result was a joint 19th place (out of 24) with 30 points; this was the lowest placement for Sweden in 13 years.

SVT appointed Annika Jankell as its spokesperson to announce the Swedish votes.

=== Voting ===
==== Points awarded to Sweden ====
Points awarded to Sweden (Final)
Score	Country
12 points	
10 points	
8 points	
7 points	Denmark
6 points	Finland; Macedonia
5 points	Moldova
4 points	
3 points	Monaco
2 points	Spain
1 point	Norway

==== Points awarded by Sweden ====
Points awarded by Sweden (Semi-final)
Score	Country
12 points	Denmark
10 points	Finland
8 points	Norway
7 points	Iceland
6 points	Croatia
5 points	Romania
4 points	Switzerland
3 points	Hungary
2 points	Poland
1 point	Macedonia

Points awarded by Sweden (Final)
Score	Country
12 points	Greece
10 points	Denmark
8 points	Norway
7 points	Bosnia and Herzegovina
6 points	Malta
5 points	Switzerland
4 points	Serbia and Montenegro
3 points	Latvia
2 points	Romania
1 point	Israel
