= Let's Celebrate 2002–2012 =

Compilation album by Melody Club
- Released: 28 November 2012
- Recorded: 2002–2012
- Length: 43:14

Melody Club chronology
Human Harbour (2011)	Let's Celebrate 2002–2012 (2012)

Let's Celebrate 2002–2012 is a compilation album by the Melody Club, celebrating their 10-year anniversary. The album features their top singles plus two new songs, namely 'Paralyzed' and 'Crossfire'. It was released 28 November 2012.

== Track listing ==
No.	Title	Original release	Length
1.	"Palace Station"	Music Machine	3:18
2.	"Crossfire"		3:12
3.	"Baby"	Face the Music	3:39
4.	"Electric"	Music Machine	3:58
5.	"Fever Fever"	Scream	3:38
6.	"Destiny Calling"	Scream	2:48
7.	"The Only Ones"	Goodbye to Romance	2:56
8.	"Wildhearts"	Face the Music	3:48
9.	"Covergirl"	Music Machine	3:25
10.	"Boys In The Girls' Room"	Face the Music	2:58
11.	"The Hunter"	Human Harbour	3:05
12.	"Paralyzed"		3:11
13.	"I Don't Believe In Angels"	Human Harbour	3:18
Total length:			43:14

== Chart positions ==
Chart (2013)	Peak position
Sweden (Sverigetopplistan)	24
