= Melodifestivalen 2005 =

Swedish music competition

Dates and venue
- Heat 1: 12 February 2005
- Heat 2: 19 February 2005
- Heat 3: 26 February 2005
- Heat 4: 5 March 2005
- Second chance: 6 March 2005
- Final: 12 March 2005

Production
- Broadcaster: Sveriges Television (SVT)
- Director: Sven Stojanovic
- Presenters: Heat 1: Shan Atci; Alexandra Pascalidou; Heat 2: Erik Haag; Henrik Schyffert; Heat 3: Marko Lehtosalo; Johanna Westman; Heat 4: Micke Leijnegard; Kayo Shekoni; Second chance: Annika Jankell; Final: Jill Johnson; Mark Levengood

Participants
- Number of entries: 32
- Number of finalists: 10

Vote
- Voting system: Heats and Second chance: 100% public vote Final: 50% public vote, 50% jury vote
- Winning song: "Las Vegas" by Martin Stenmarck

Melodifestivalen 2005 was the 45th edition of the Swedish music competition Melodifestivalen, which was organised by Sveriges Television (SVT) and took place over a five-week period between 12 February and 12 March 2005. The winner of the competition was Martin Stenmarck with the song "Las Vegas", who represented Sweden in the Eurovision Song Contest 2005, where he came nineteenth with 30 points.

Nanne Grönvall's defeat was met with consternation by many people, who felt that a gap of over 150,000 votes should be enough for victory. There were even calls for SVT to scrap the jury system altogether and simply let the televotes decide the winner. For a comparison, it was noted that Grönvall had received more votes than Lena Philipsson, the popular 2004 winner. However, SVT said that there was nothing they could do about the result. Four finalists topped the Swedish charts. Alcazar and Alcastar got to number one the week before the final, Jimmy Jansson got to the number one some weeks after that with Vi kan gunga, Martin Stenmarck's winner Las Vegas hit the top spot the week after that, while Nanne Grönvall and Håll om mig topped the charts the week after that.

== Format ==
The heats for Melodifestivalen 2005 began on 12 February 2005. Ten songs from these heats qualified for the final on March 12, 2005. This was the fourth year that a heat format had been used for the competition.

Competition Schedule
Show	Date	City	Venue	Presenters
Heat 1	12 February 2005	Gothenburg	Scandinavium	Shan Atci; Alexandra Pascalidou
Heat 2	19 February 2005	Linköping	Cloetta Center	Erik Haag; Henrik Schyffert
Heat 3	26 February 2005	Skellefteå	Skellefteå Kraft Arena	Marko Lehtosalo; Johanna Westman
Heat 4	5 March 2005	Växjö	Tipshallen	Micke Leijnegard; Kayo Shekoni
Second chance	6 March 2005	Stockholm	Berns	Annika Jankell
Final	12 March 2005	Stockholm	Stockholm Globe Arena	Jill Johnson; Mark Levengood

=== Wildcards ===
Unlike past years, where all Melodifestivalen participants were chosen by a selection jury, starting in 2004, four out of the 32 participants were selected directly by the contest's producers, in order to increase musical and artistic breadth. Each artist, called "wildcard", participated in a different heat. The wildcards in 2005 were the following:

Artist	Song	Heat
Alcazar	"Alcastar"	Heat 1
Sanne Salomonsen	"Higher Ground"	Heat 2
K2 feat. Alannah Myles	"We Got It All"	Heat 3
Nanne Grönvall	"Håll om mig"	Heat 4

=== Heat Jury ===
In the first two heats, a jury was used to select two of the five songs that would proceed to the second round of voting, with the intent of giving some entries that could be slow in accumulating votes a chance. However, after heat 2, SVT dissolved the jury as it had chosen entries that were already voted by the viewers together with criticism that this reduced the people's influence in the result. The jury consisted of:

- Cia Axelsson
- Janne Schaffer
- Joakim Vogel
- Jonna Bergh Wahlström
- Josefine Sundström

== Competing entries ==
Artist	Song	Songwriter(s)
Alcazar	"Alcastar"	Johan Fransson; Niklas Edberger; Tim Larsson; Tobias Lundgren; Anders Hansson
Anne-Lie Rydé	"Så nära"	Anne-Lie Rydé; Thomas G:son
Arja Saijonmaa	"Vad du än trodde så trodde du fel"	Dan Sundquist; Åsa Jinder
B-Boys feat. Paul M	"One Step Closer"	Gustav Eurén; Karl Eurén; Niclas Arn; David Seisay; Peter Thelenius
Bodies Without Organs	"Gone"	Anders Hansson; Mårten Sandén
Cameron Cartio	"Roma"	Cameron Cartio; Robin Rex
Camilla Brinck	"Jenny"	Camilla Brinck; Tobias Karlsson
Caroline Wennergren	"A Different Kind of Love"	Sam McCarthy; Joacim Dubbelman; Martin Landh
Cecilia Vennersten	"Var mig nära"	Calle Kindbom; Robert Åhlin
Date	"Hörde änglarna viska ditt namn"	Fredrik Jernberg; Johnny Thunqvist; Pontus Wennerberg
Fredrik & Sanna	"Du och jag mot världen"	Fredrik Kempe; Bobby Ljunggren; Henrik Wikström
Group Avalon	"Big Up"	Djo Moupondo; Marcus Landström; Mohombi Moupondo
Jessica Folcker	"Om natten"	Johan Fransson; Niklas Edberger; Tim Larsson; Tobias Lundgren
Jimmy Jansson	"Vi kan gunga"	Johan Fransson; Niklas Edberger; Tim Larsson; Tobias Lundgren
Josef	"Rain"	Annelie Martin; Martin Blix; Bobby Ljunggren; Henrik Wikström
Josefin Nilsson	"Med hjärtats egna ord"	Jonas Isaksson; Lotta Ahlin; Tommy Lydell
K2 feat. Alannah Myles	"We Got It All"	Kee Marcello; Michael Blair; Zal
Katrina and the Nameless	"As If Tomorrow Will Never Come"	Thomas G:son
Kwanzaa	"Lovin' Your Feen"	Ayesha Quraishi; Jean DC
LaGaylia	"Nothing At All"	Lars Edvall; Mattias Reimer
Linda Bengtzing	"Alla flickor"	Johan Fransson; Niklas Edberger; Tim Larsson; Tobias Lundgren
Martin Stenmarck	"Las Vegas"	Johan Fransson; Niklas Edberger; Tim Larsson; Tobias Lundgren
Mathias Holmgren	"Långt bortom tid och rum"	Calle Kindbom; Thomas G:son
NaNa	"Wherever You Go"	Larry Forsberg; Lennart Wastesson; Sven-Inge Sjöberg
Nanne Grönvall	"Håll om mig"	Ingela Forsman; Nanne Grönvall
Nordman	"Ödet var min väg"	Dan Attlerud; Mats Wester
Papa Dee	"My No. 1"	Daniel Wahlgren; Bobby Ljunggren; Marcos Ubeda
Pay TV	"Refrain, Refrain"	Håkan Lidbo; Ulrika Lidbo
Rickard Engfors and Katarina	"Ready For Me"	Dan Attlerud; Lars "Dille" Diedricson; Peter Nordholm
Sanne Salomonsen	"Higher Ground"	Henrik Jahnsson; Jeanette Olsson; Moh Denebi
Shirley Clamp	"Att älska dig"	Shirley Clamp; Sonja Aldén; Bobby Ljunggren; Robert Olausson; Henrik Wikström
The Wallstones	"Invisible People"	Johan Becker; Karl Martindahl

== Contest overview ==
=== Heat 1 ===
The first heat took place on 12 February 2005 at the Scandinavium in Gothenburg. 3,172,000 viewers watched the heat live. A total of 497,356 votes were cast, with a total of SEK 1,563,052 collected for Radiohjälpen. The heat was hosted by Shan Atci and Alexandra Pascalidou.

R/O	Artist	Song	Votes			Place	Result
R/O	Artist	Song	Round 1	Round 2	Total	Place	Result
1	Alcazar	"Alcastar"	35,976	43,010	78,986	3	Second Chance
2	Cecilia Vennersten	"Var mig nära"	5,069	—N/a	5,069	8	Out
3	Papa Dee	"My No. 1"	25,446	—N/a	25,446	6	Out
4	Linda Bengtzing	"Alla flickor"	33,338	44,503	77,841	4	Second Chance
5	The Wallstones	"Invisible People"	32,355	40,205	72,560	5	Out
6	Pay TV	"Refrain, Refrain"	10,792	—N/a	10,792	7	Out
7	Nordman	"Ödet var min väg"	36,103	49,381	85,484	2	Final
8	Shirley Clamp	"Att älska dig"	69,785	77,713	147,498	1	Final

=== Heat 2 ===
The second heat took place on 19 February 2005 at the Cloetta Center in Linköping. 3,150,000 viewers watched the heat live. A total of 369,946 votes were cast, with a total of SEK 1,326,244 collected for Radiohjälpen. The heat was hosted by Erik Haag and Henrik Schyffert.

R/O	Artist	Song	Votes			Place	Result
R/O	Artist	Song	Round 1	Round 2	Total	Place	Result
1	Fredrik & Sanna	"Du och jag mot världen"	38,642	65,313	103,955	1	Final
2	Camilla Brinck	"Jenny"	15,031	—N/a	15,031	7	Out
3	Group Avalon	"Big Up"	15,032	—N/a	15,032	6	Out
4	Arja Saijonmaa	"Vad du än trodde så trodde du fel"	14,118	—N/a	14,118	8	Out
5	Josefin Nilsson	"Med hjärtats egna ord"	18,354	28,316	46,670	3	Second Chance
6	Cameron Cartio	"Roma"	16,232	27,293	43,525	4	Second Chance
7	Bodies Without Organs	"Gone"	16,508	25,796	42,304	5	Out
8	Sanne Salomonsen	"Higher Ground"	36,118	53,193	89,311	2	Final

=== Heat 3 ===
The third heat took place on 26 February 2005 at the Skellefteå Kraft Arena in Skellefteå. 2,942,000 viewers watched the heat live. A total of 456,883 votes were cast, with a total of SEK 1,506,077 collected for Radiohjälpen. The heat was hosted by Marko Lehtosalo and Johanna Westman.

R/O	Artist	Song	Votes			Place	Result
R/O	Artist	Song	Round 1	Round 2	Total	Place	Result
1	NaNa	"Wherever You Go"	25,053	38,891	63,944	3	Second Chance
2	Kwanzaa	"Lovin' Your Feen"	3,179	—N/a	3,179	8	Out
3	Jimmy Jansson	"Vi kan gunga"	52,485	62,845	115,330	2	Final
4	LaGaylia	"Nothing At All"	20,706	24,753	45,459	4	Second Chance
5	Josef	"Rain"	23,410	24,597	48,007	5	Out
6	K2 feat. Alannah Myles	"We Got It All"	11,712	—N/a	11,712	7	Out
7	Jessica Folcker	"Om natten"	19,306	—N/a	19,306	6	Out
8	Martin Stenmarck	"Las Vegas"	76,508	73,538	150,046	1	Final

=== Heat 4 ===
The fourth heat took place on 5 March 2005 at the Tipshallen in Växjö. 3,102,000 viewers watched the heat live. A total of 411,920 votes were cast, with a total of SEK 1,255,983 collected for Radiohjälpen. The heat was hosted by Micke Leijnegard and Kayo Shekoni.

R/O	Artist	Song	Votes			Place	Result
R/O	Artist	Song	Round 1	Round 2	Total	Place	Result
1	Anne-Lie Rydé	"Så nära"	19,043	25,124	44,167	5	Out
2	B-Boys feat. Paul M	"One Step Closer"	16,820	—N/a	16,820	6	Out
3	Mathias Holmgren	"Långt bortom tid och rum"	21,337	28,775	50,112	4	Second Chance
4	Rickard Engfors and Katarina	"Ready For Me"	9,774	—N/a	9,774	8	Out
5	Date	"Hörde änglarna viska ditt namn"	14,930	—N/a	14,930	7	Out
6	Nanne Grönvall	"Håll om mig"	53,726	67,876	121,602	1	Final
7	Caroline Wennergren	"A Different Kind of Love"	29,456	63,664	93,120	2	Final
8	Katrina and the Nameless	"As If Tomorrow Will Never Come"	30,632	30,763	61,125	3	Second Chance

=== Second chance ===
The second chance round took place on 6 March 2005 at the Berns in Stockholm. 1,497,000 viewers watched the show live. A total of 440,156 votes were cast, with a total of SEK 1,067,715 collected for Radiohjälpen. The show was hosted by Annika Jankell.

R/O	Artist	Song	Votes			Place	Result
R/O	Artist	Song	Round 1	Round 2	Total	Place	Result
1	Alcazar	"Alcastar"	47,762	63,533	111,925	1	Final
2	Linda Bengtzing	"Alla flickor"	38,861	54,253	93,114	2	Final
3	Josefin Nilsson	"Med hjärtats egna ord"	20,537	—N/a	20,537	7	Out
4	Cameron Cartio	"Roma"	18,945	—N/a	18,945	8	Out
5	NaNa	"Wherever You Go"	28,510	38,254	66,764	4	Out
6	LaGaylia	"Nothing At All"	27,547	53,126	80,673	3	Out
7	Mathias Holmgren	"Långt bortom tid och rum"	25,472	—N/a	25,472	5	Out
8	Katrina and the Nameless	"As If Tomorrow Will Never Come"	24,489	—N/a	24,489	6	Out

=== Final ===
The final took place on 12 March 2005 at the Stockholm Globe Arena in Stockholm. 4,054,000 viewers watched the show live. A total of 1,519,997 votes were cast, with a total of SEK 4,105,936 collected for Radiohjälpen. The show was hosted by Jill Johnson and Mark Levengood.

R/O	Artist	Song	Juries	Televote		Total	Place
R/O	Artist	Song	Juries	Votes	Points	Total	Place
1	Martin Stenmarck	"Las Vegas"	102	208,716	110	212	1
2	Linda Bengtzing	"Alla flickor"	15	95,532	0	15	10
3	Nordman	"Ödet var min väg"	4	111,684	11	15	9
4	Shirley Clamp	"Att älska dig"	86	153,923	44	130	4
5	Sanne Salomonsen	"Higher Ground"	35	36,219	0	35	7
6	Caroline Wennergren	"A Different Kind of Love"	28	204,040	88	116	5
7	Alcazar	"Alcastar"	69	165,497	66	135	3
8	Jimmy Jansson	"Vi kan gunga"	27	130,021	22	49	6
9	Fredrik Kempe & Sanna Nielsen	"Du och jag mot världen"	30	40,437	0	30	8
10	Nanne Grönvall	"Håll om mig"	77	373,928	132	209	2

Detailed jury votes
R/O	Song	Luleå	Umeå	Sundsvall	Falun	Karlstad	Örebro	Norrköping	Gothenburg	Växjö	Malmö	Stockholm	Total
1	"Las Vegas"	12	12	6	4	12	12	12	8	10	8	6	102
2	"Alla flickor"			10					2	2		1	15
3	"Ödet var min väg"				1	1	1				1		4
4	"Att älska dig"		10	4	10	4	10	10	10	6	10	12	86
5	"Higher Ground"	1	1	1	2	6		4	6	4	6	4	35
6	"A Different Kind of Love"	4	4	8		2	8	2					28
7	"Alcastar"	8	8	2	6	10	2	8	1	12	2	10	69
8	"Vi kan gunga"	10			8	8				1			27
9	"Du och jag mot världen"	2	6				6	6	4		4	2	30
10	"Håll om mig"	6	2	12	12		4	1	12	8	12	8	77
Jury spokespersons
Luleå – Roger Pontare; Umeå – Micke Leijnegard; Sundsvall – Kayo Shekoni; Falun – Annika Jankell; Karlstad – Markoolio; Örebro – Alexandra Pascalidou; Norrköping – Shan Atci; Gothenburg – Lasse Kronér; Växjö – Johanna Westman; Malmö – Kattis Ahlström; Stockholm – Ulf Elfving

== Ratings ==
Viewing figures by show
Show	Air date	Viewers (millions)	Ref.
Heat 1	12 February 2005	3.172	
Heat 2	19 February 2005	3.150	
Heat 3	26 February 2005	2.942	
Heat 4	5 March 2005	3.105	
Second chance	6 March 2005	1.497	
Final	12 March 2005	4.054	

== See also ==
- Eurovision Song Contest 2005
- Sweden in the Eurovision Song Contest
- Sweden in the Eurovision Song Contest 2005
