= Roma (Cameron Cartio song) =

Single by Cameron Cartio

from the album Borderless
- Language: Persian
- Released: 2005
- Recorded: 2005
- Genre: Middle eastern pop
- Length: 3:03
- Label: Epic
- Composers: Robin Rex; Cameron Cartio
- Lyricist: Cameron Cartio
- Producer: Alex Papaconstantinou

Cameron Cartio singles chronology
"Roma" (2005)	"Henna" (2006)

Music video
- "Roma" on YouTube

"Henna" is a song by Iranian-born Swedish singer Cameron Cartio. It was released on 2005 by Epic Records as the lead single from his debut studio album, Borderless. It is sung in a conlang Cameron Cartio himself made. The song took part in the 2005 edition of Melodifestivalen in a bid to represent Sweden in the Eurovision Song Contest 2005.

In the Melodifestivalen competition, he reached Semi-final 2 which was held on 19 February 2005 in Tipshallen, Växjö and came 4th out of 8 in that phase as a result of televoting, was given a "second chance". In the "second chance round" held on 6 March 2005, held in Berns, Stockholm, he took part wit 7 other contestants, namely Alcazar, Linda Bengtzing, Josefin Nilsson, Na Na, LaGaylia, Mathias Holmgren and Katrina and the Nameless, he was unsuccessful in moving to the Finals round. Martin Stenmarck went on to win the Melodifestivalen competition with his song "Las Vegas".

== Track list ==
1. "Roma" (3:00)
2. "Roma (extended Version)" (3:11)

== Charts ==
Despite "Roma" not being successful in winning the bid to represent Sweden, the song became very popular with the Swedish public, and "Roma" was released on Sony/BMG and became a hit on Sverigetopplistan the official Swedish Singles Chart, reaching #4 as its top position.

Chart (2005)	Peak position
Sweden (Sverigetopplistan)	4

== Spanish version ==
Cameron Cartio released a Spanish language version of the song in Spain, a practice he would repeat with his follow-up song "Henna", a duo with Khaled, again partly in Cameron Cartio's constructed language, but released in Spain in a Spanish-language version.Video on YouTube
