= Sjumilakliv =

Single by Martin Stenmarck

from the album 9 sanningar och en lögn
- A-side: "Sjumilakliv"
- B-side: "Sjumilakliv" (video)
- Released: September 6, 2006
- Genre: pop rock
- Length: 4:04
- Label: Universal
- Songwriters: David Stenmarck, Martin Stenmarck
- Producer: David Stenmarck

Martin Stenmarck singles chronology
"Las Vegas" (2005)	"Sjumilakliv" (2006)	"Nästa dans" (2007)

"Sjumilakliv" is a song written by Martin and David Stenmarck, and recorded by Martin Stenmarck on his 2006 album 9 sanningar och en lögn as well as released as a single the same year. The song topped the Swedish singles chart, and a Bassflow remix was later released. The song was awarded a Grammis Award for "Song of the year 2006" and a Rockbjörnen award in the "Swedish song of the year" category.

On 8 October 2006, the song topped Svensktoppen and on 28 October the same year it also topped Trackslistan. The single sold platinum twice.

At Dansbandskampen 2010, the song was performed by Wizex.

== Charts ==
Chart (2006–2007)	Peak position
Sweden (Sverigetopplistan)	1
