= Goodbye to Romance =

Goodbye to Romance may refer to:

- Goodbye to Romance (song), a song by Ozzy Osbourne, from the album Blizzard of Ozz
- Goodbye to Romance (album), a 2009 album by Melody Club
