= Håll om mig =

Single by Nanne Grönvall
- Released: 2005
- Length: 3:02
- Label: M&L (Capitol Music Group Sweden)
- Songwriters: Ingela Forsman, Nanne Grönvall

Nanne Grönvall singles chronology
"Evig kärlek" (2003)	"Håll om mig" (2005)	"Jag sträcker mig mot himlen" (2005)

Håll om mig (lit. 'Hold Me'), written by Ingela Forsman and Nanne Grönvall, is a song performed by Nanne Grönvall at Melodifestivalen 2005. The song won a late 2004 contest, as very few songs with female songwriters had been selected for Melodifestivalen. The song was performed for first time in the 4th Melodifestivalen semifinal, inside Växjö tipshall in Växjö on 5 March 2005. From the semifinal, the song went all the way to the final inside the Stockholm Globe Arena one week later. The song became popular among the audience, and was expected to win the final. After the votings, the song received most votes from the TV viewers, but the jury groups appointed the Martin Stenmarck song Las Vegas as winner. Håll om mig ended up second, three points after the winning song.

The song was also recorded in English, in a country style, by Nanne Grönvall in a duet with Elisabeth Andreassen under the title "Hold Me", and wws released on 7 August 2026.

== Chart performance ==
The song became successful charting, topping the Swedish singles chart three weeks after release. The single topped the Swedish singles chart for two weeks, and charted for totally 32 weeks, ending the chart visit on 22 December 2005. The song entered Svensktoppen on 3 April 2005, topping the chart before staying at the chart for 36 weeks, ending the visit on 4 December 2005 and ending up as the third most successful Svensktoppen song in 2005.

During 2005, the song was voted as winner for the National Finals Song Contest.

=== Charts ===
Chart (2005)	Peak position
Sweden (Sverigetopplistan)	1

== Album ==
The song appeared on two 2005 Nanne Grönwall albums, 20 år med Nanne and Alltid på väg.

== Trivia ==
- Nanne Grönvall recorded a new, humorist, version of the song for the After Dark show, back then called Håll i mig.
- A Framåt fredag parody was called "Kör om mig", giving the song a traffic-related theme.
- At Dansbandskampen 2009, the song was performed by Titanix, when Nanne Grönvall was the theme of the evening during the second round.
- This song is also used for a popular AMV (Anime music video) featuring scenes from the animated series Princess Tutu.
- Håll om mig is sampled in the 2021 song Step-Grandma by Swedish producer Salvatore Ganacci.
