= Henna (song) =

Single by Cameron Cartio featuring Khaled

from the album Borderless
- Language: Persian; Algerian arabic
- Released: 30 May 2006
- Recorded: 2005
- Genre: Middle eastern pop
- Length: 3:12
- Label: Sony BMG Music Entertainment
- Songwriters: Alex Papaconstantinou; Khaled Hadj Ibrahim; Cameron Cartio
- Composer: Marcus Englöf
- Producer: Alex Papaconstantinou

Cameron Cartio singles chronology
"Roma" (2005)	"Henna" (2006)	"Electric" (2011)

Khaled singles chronology
"Zine Zina" (2004)	"Henna" (2006)	"Même pas fatigué !!!" (2009)

Music video
- "Henna" on YouTube

"Henna" is a song by Iranian-born Swedish singer Cameron Cartio featuring Algerian singer Khaled. It was released on 30 May 2006 by Sony BMG Music Entertainment as the second single from Cameron's debut studio album, Borderless.

Khaled's involvement began after Cameron ended his relationship with his girlfriend, who was a devoted Khaled fan. Cartio, an aspiring and relatively obscure artist at the time, penned the lyrics in his own constructed language and sent them to Khaled. Impressed, Khaled agreed to contribute his own part as a tribute to Cartio's former girlfriend. In addition to popularity in Sweden and throughout the Iranian diaspora, the song became hugely popular in the Arab World basically because of the involvement of Khaled in the Arab diaspora.

== Track listings ==
Swedish CD single 2005

1. "Henna" — 3:12
2. "Henna" (extended version) — 3:51

Spanish CD maxi-single

1. "Henna" (extended Spanish Version) — 3:51
2. "Henna" (Ferrero single Version) — 3:43
3. "Henna" (original Version) — 3:13
4. "Henna" (Ferrero extended version) — 4:10

European and Swedish CD single 2006

1. "Henna" (Spanish version) — 3:12
2. "Henna" (original version) — 3:12

German CD maxi-single

1. "Henna" (Spanish Version) — 3:15
2. "Henna" (Spanish Version - Reggaeton remix) — 3:19
3. "Henna" (The Attic remix - radio edit) — 3:55
4. "Henna" (original Version) — 3:15
5. "Henna" (extended Spanish Version) — 3:50

Khaled appeared with courtesy of Universal where he was signed

== Spanish version ==
As had happened with his earlier 2005 hit "Roma", Cameron Cartio released a Spanish language version of "Henna" featuring Khaled in Spain with the Cartio conlang being replaced by Spanish, although the Khaled verses in Arabic were kept the same.

A music video with the Spanish lyrics was released by Cameron's brother Alec Cartio. In addition to the new Spanish version, the 4-track maxi CD included separately the original conlang version and also two remixes by Ferrero.

Track list of the Spain release

1. Henna (extended Spanish version) featuring Khaled (3:51)
2. Henna (Ferrero single remix) featuring Khaled (3:43)
3. Henna (original version) featuring Khaled (3:13)
4. Henna (Ferrero extended remix) featuring Khaled (4:10)

== Live performance ==
Cartio and Khaled were invited to perform the song at the 2006 European Athletics Championships held in August 2006 in Gothenburg, Sweden. They performed the song live in the opening ceremonies to the games on 7 August 2006, also broadcast live internationally via the Swedish television station SVT.

== Charts ==
Chart (2006)	Peak position
Belgium (Ultratip Bubbling Under Flanders)	8
Hungary (Dance Top 40)	6
Hungary (Rádiós Top 40)	2
Netherlands (Single Top 100)	86
Sweden (Sverigetopplistan)	9
