= Destiny Calling =

Destiny Calling may refer to:

- "Destiny Calling" (James song), 1998
- "Destiny Calling" (Melody Club song), 2006
- "Destiny Calling" (Gotham), a 2017 episode of Gotham
