= At Your Service =

At Your Service may refer to:

- At Your Service-Star Power, a public service program first aired on GMA Network
- At Your Service (The Circle album), a 2015 live album by The Circle
- At Your Service (Melody Club album), a 2007 greatest hits album by Melody Club
- At Your Service (TV series), an Irish makeover television programme
- "At Your Service", a 2008 episode of the American animated television series Chowder
- Aap Ki Sewa Mein (lit. 'At Your Service'), a 1946 Indian Hindi-language film
