= Cartio =

Cartio is a surname. Notable people with the surname include:

- Cameron Cartio, Iranian-Swedish singer
