= Nouveau Riche =

Nouveau riche is a social class.

Nouveau Riche may also refer to:

- Nouveau Riche (Philadelphia band)
- Nouveau Riche (Swedish band)
- Nouveau Riche (college), a defunct, unaccredited real estate investment college
- "Nouveau Riche", a song by Glaive from the 2025 album Y'all
