= Septemberland =

Studio album by Martin Stenmarck
- Released: 2009
- Genre: Pop rock
- Length: 39 minutes
- Label: M Entertainment

Martin Stenmarck chronology
Det är det pojkar gör när kärleken dör (2007)	Septemberland (2009)	Kaffe på Everest (2010)

Septemberland is a studio album by Martin Stenmarck, released in 2009.

== Track listing ==
1. "Som en vän"
2. "Fix"
3. "1000 nålar"
4. "Andas"
5. "Jag vill jag vill jag vill"
6. "Explosionen"
7. "Happy Ending"
8. "Gråa hjärtans sorg"
9. "J Jeff & Jesus"
10. "I septemberland"

== Charts ==
=== Weekly charts ===
Chart (2009)	Peak position
Swedish Albums (Sverigetopplistan)	10

=== Year-end charts ===
Chart (2009)	Position
Swedish Albums (Sverigetopplistan)	93
