= I ljus och mörker =

Single by Viktoria Krantz and Martin Stenmarck
- Released: 2004
- Songwriter(s): music and lyrics: Martin Stenmarck; Viktoria Krantz; Marcos Ciscar

"I ljus och mörker" is a single from 2004 by Viktoria Krantz och Martin Stenmarck. The song entered Svensktoppen on 8 February 2004. The song also appears on the album Musikäventyret Arn De Gothia.
