= Det är det pojkar gör när kärleken dör =

Studio album by Martin Stenmarck
- Released: 7 November 2007
- Genre: Pop rock
- Length: 41 minutes
- Label: M

Martin Stenmarck chronology
9 sanningar och en lögn (2006)	Det är det pojkar gör när kärleken dör (2007)	Septemberland (2009)

Det är det pojkar gör när kärleken dör is a studio album by Martin Stenmarck, released on 7 November 2007.

== Track listing ==
1. "Rubb och stubb" – 3:05
2. "100 år från nu (Blundar)" – 3:51
3. "Det ska vara fest den dagen jag dör" – 4:19
4. "Liten man på jorden" – 3:49
5. "Psalm nr 2" – 5:01
6. "Det är det pojkar gör när kärleken dör" – 3:29
7. "Ful" – 4:24
8. "Dagen D" – 3:46
9. "Den långa vägen hem (4 km-sången)" – 4:14
10. "100 år från nu (Blundar)" (Bassflow Remix) – 3:34
11. "Som en sten" – 4:11

== Charts ==
Chart (2007–2008)	Peak position
Swedish Albums (Sverigetopplistan)	4
