= Felice Jankell =

Swedish actress

- Born: Félice Jankell
- Occupation: Actor
- Years active: 2005–present

Felice Jankell is a Swedish actress. She is known for playing the lead role of "Sophie" in the movie Unga Sophie Bell.

== Acting career ==
Unga Sophie Bell (Young Sophie Bell) was her feature film debut. She again played the female lead in sv:Från djupet av mitt hjärta. Swedish newspaper Barometern reported that she will act in the film adaptation of the novel Kalmars jägarinnor written by Tove Folkesson. Currently she has completed the upcoming Swedish horror film "Svart Cirkel" (Black Circle) directed by es:Adrián García Bogliano. Felice plays Michael Nyqvists daughter in the "100 Code" .

=== Nomination ===
She was nominated in the best actress category at the Guldbagge Awards in 2016 for "Unga Sophie Bell".

== Personal life ==
Felice is the daughter of Thorsten Flinck and Annika Jankell, and the sister of Happy Jankell. She is of French-Moroccan descent through her paternal grandfather. Jankell and partner, Nils Tham, had a child in November 2019.
