= Mästarnas mästare =

Swedish reality competition show

Mästarnas mästare (idiomatic translation "Champion of Champions") is a Swedish reality competition show which each season features a number of former athletic stars who all became "masters" of their individual sports. In the show the athletes compete against each other in a number of different athletic challenges. All contestants have in common that they have won at least one gold medal in their respective sports and they have all ended their careers. The show has been broadcast on SVT since 2009. It was awarded the Kristallen award in 2010 in the category "Reality Show of the Year" and a Kristallen award in 2011 in the category "Show of the Year". The show is hosted by Michael Leijnegard. It is based on the Belgian concept Eeuwige Roem.
