= Happy Jankell =

Swedish actress (born 1993)

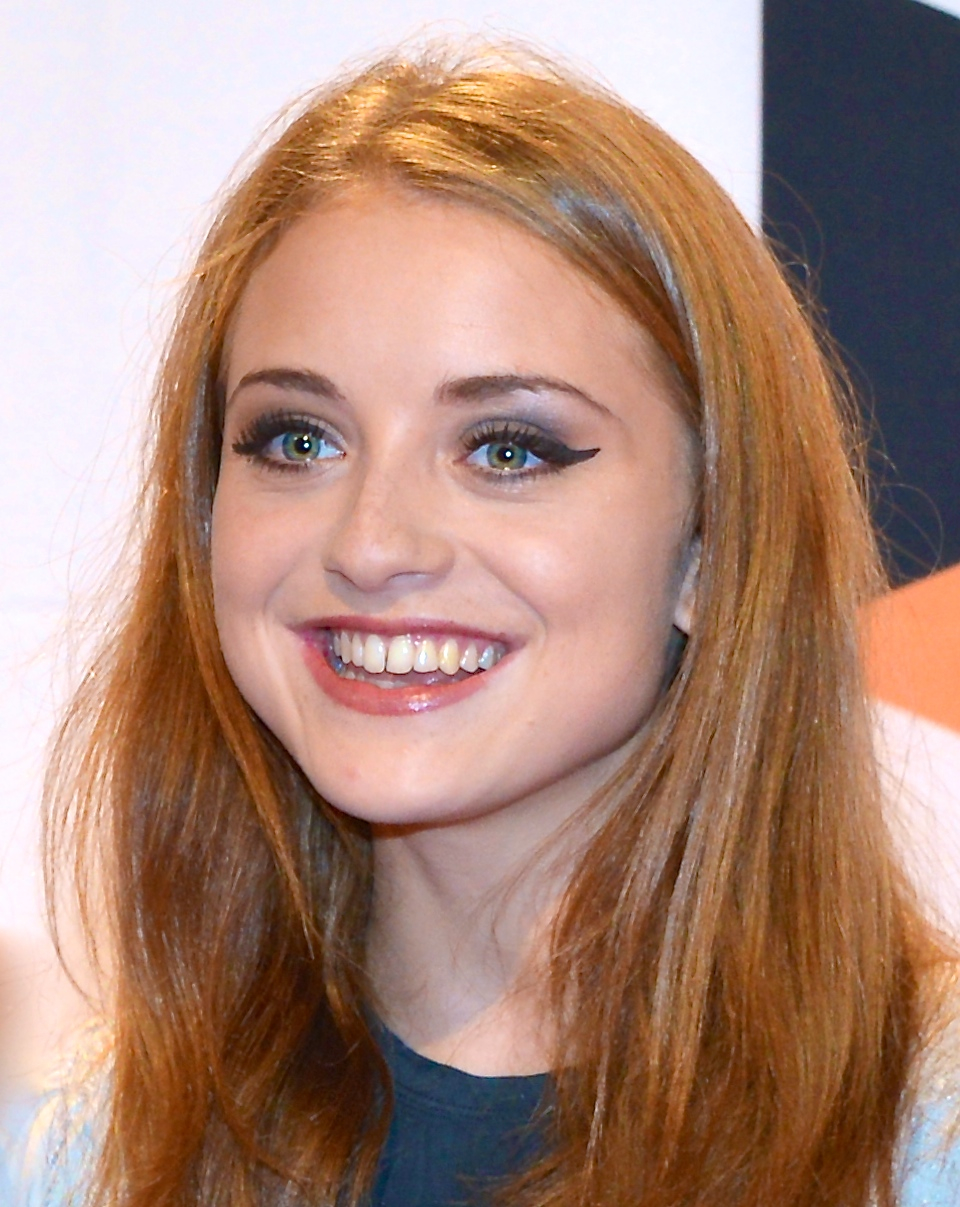
- Born: Happy Betty Nicóle Hildegard Jankell; 16 December 1993 (age 31)
- Occupation: Actress
- Years active: 2007–present

Happy Betty Nicóle Hildegard Jankell (born 16 December 1993) is a Swedish actress.

== Personal life ==
Jankell is the second daughter of Thorsten Flinck and Annika Jankell. She is the younger sister of Felice Jankell, and is of French-Moroccan descent through her paternal grandfather.

== Filmography ==
=== Film ===
- Den nya människan (2007)
- Maskeraden (2009)
- Tusen gånger starkare (2010)
- IRL (2013)
- Ted – För kärlekens skull (2018)

=== Television ===
- Ett gott parti (2007)
- Värsta vännerna (2008)
- Anno 1790 (2011)
- Portkod 1321 (2012)
- Fjällbackamorden (2012)
- Crimes of Passion (2013)
- Jordskott (2015)
- Star vs the Forces of Evil (2015) *Swedish Dub as Star Butterfly
- Familjen Rysberg (2015)
- Portkod 1525 (2016)
- Storm på Lugna gatan (2018)
- The Rain (2020)
