= 9 sanningar och en lögn =

Studio album by Martin Stenmarck
- Released: 25 October 2006
- Genre: Pop rock
- Length: 41 minutes
- Label: Universal Music

Martin Stenmarck chronology
Upp & ner sånger (2005)	9 sanningar och en lögn (2006)	Det är det pojkar gör när kärleken dör (2007)

9 sanningar och en lögn is a studio album by Martin Stenmarck and was released on 25 October 2006.

== Track listing ==
1. Sjumilakliv - 4:46
2. Dårarna och jag - 3:40
3. Ta undulaten - 4:22
4. Han är galen - 3:27
5. Ta dom jävlarna - 4:00
6. Hand i hand - 3:42 (duet with Søs Fenger)
7. Nästa dans - 3:40
8. Om du rör mig dör jag - 2:57
9. Virvelvinden du - 5:27
10. Hem - 5:16

== Contributors ==
- Martin Stenmarck - vocals
- Sebastian Nylund - guitar
- Stefan Olsson - bass
- Peer Åström - drums
- Rickard Nilsson - piano

== Charts ==
=== Weekly charts ===
Chart (2006–2007)	Peak position
Swedish Albums (Sverigetopplistan)	1

=== Year-end charts ===
Chart (2006)	Position
Swedish Albums (Sverigetopplistan)	6
Chart (2007)	Position
Swedish Albums (Sverigetopplistan)	69
