= Destiny Calling (Melody Club song) =

Single by Melody Club

from the album Scream
- A-side: "Destiny Calling"
- B-side: "You Are Not Alone"
- Released: 8 November 2006
- Genre: Electronic rock
- Label: EMI Music Sweden
- Songwriter: Kristofer Östergren
- Producer: Marco Manieri

Melody Club singles chronology
"Scream" (2006)	"Destiny Calling" (2006)	"Fever Fever" (2006)

"Destiny Calling" is a song written by Kristofer Östergren and recorded by Swedish band Melody Club on the 2006 album Scream. In November 2006 the song was released as a single and peaked at 15th position at the Swedish singles chart.

== Chart positions ==
=== Weekly charts ===
Chart (2006–2007)	Peak position
Sweden (Sverigetopplistan)	15

=== Year-end charts ===
Chart (2006)	Position
Sweden (Sverigetopplistan)	66
