= Human Harbour =

Studio album by Melody Club
- Released: 2 March 2011
- Length: 44 minutes
- Label: Electric/Versity

Melody Club chronology
Goodbye to Romance (2009)	Human Harbour (2011)	Let's Celebrate 2002–2012 (2012)

Human Harbour is the fifth studio album by Swedish band Melody Club released on March 2, 2011.

== Track listing ==
1. The Hunter
2. Dreamers Wasteland
3. Sweet Disaster
4. A New Set of Wings
5. Only You Can Heal Me
6. War of Hearts
7. Human Harvest
8. Bed of Needles
9. Karma Control
10. I Don't Believe in Angels
11. You Don't Love Me

== Chart positions ==
Chart (2011)	Peak position
Sweden	22
