= Goodbye to Romance (album) =

Studio album by Melody Club
- Released: April 22, 2009
- Genre: Electronic rock

Melody Club chronology
At Your Service (2007)	Goodbye to Romance (2009)	Human Harbour (2011)

Goodbye to Romance is an album by Melody Club released on April 22, 2009.

== Track listing ==
1. On the Run
2. She's the Girl
3. Where Do I Belong
4. Girl Don't Always Want to Have Fun
5. Devil in You
6. Eighteen
7. The Only Ones
8. Do You Wanna Dance
9. High Society Girl
10. Oh Candy Call Me

== Chart positions ==
Chart (2009)	Peak position
Sweden (Sverigetopplistan)	18
