= A Different Kind of Love =

Single by Caroline Wennergren

from the album Bossa Supernova
- Released: 2005
- Genre: pop
- Label: Plugged
- Songwriter(s): Joacim Dubbelman, Martin Landh, Sam McCarthy

Caroline Wennergren singles chronology
"A Different Kind of Love" (2005)	"Doing the Bossa Supernova" (2005)

"A Different Kind of Love" is a song written by Joacim Dubbelman, Martin Landh and Sam McCarthy, and performed by Caroline Wennergren at Melodifestivalen 2005. Participating in the fourth semifinal in Växjö, the song made it directly to the finals, where it ended up 5th.

Released as a single the same year. the song also appeared on her 2005 album Bossa Supernova.

== Charts ==
Chart (2005)	Peak position
Sweden (Sverigetopplistan)	16
