= Face the Music (Melody Club album) =

Studio album by Melody Club
- Released: August 25, 2004
- Genre: New wave, nu-disco, synthpop, glam rock, synthrock

Melody Club chronology
Music Machine (2002)	Face the Music (2004)	Scream (2006)

Face the Music is an album by Melody Club released on August 25, 2004.

== Track listing ==
1. Killing a Boy
2. Cats in the Dark
3. Take Me Away
4. Love Drive
5. Boys In The Girls' Room
6. Wildhearts
7. Baby
8. Summer Low
9. Breakaway
10. Winterland
11. Tomorrow is a Stranger

== Charts ==
Chart (2004–2005)	Peak position
Sweden (Sverigetopplistan)	6
