= Annika Jankell =

Swedish television host and journalist

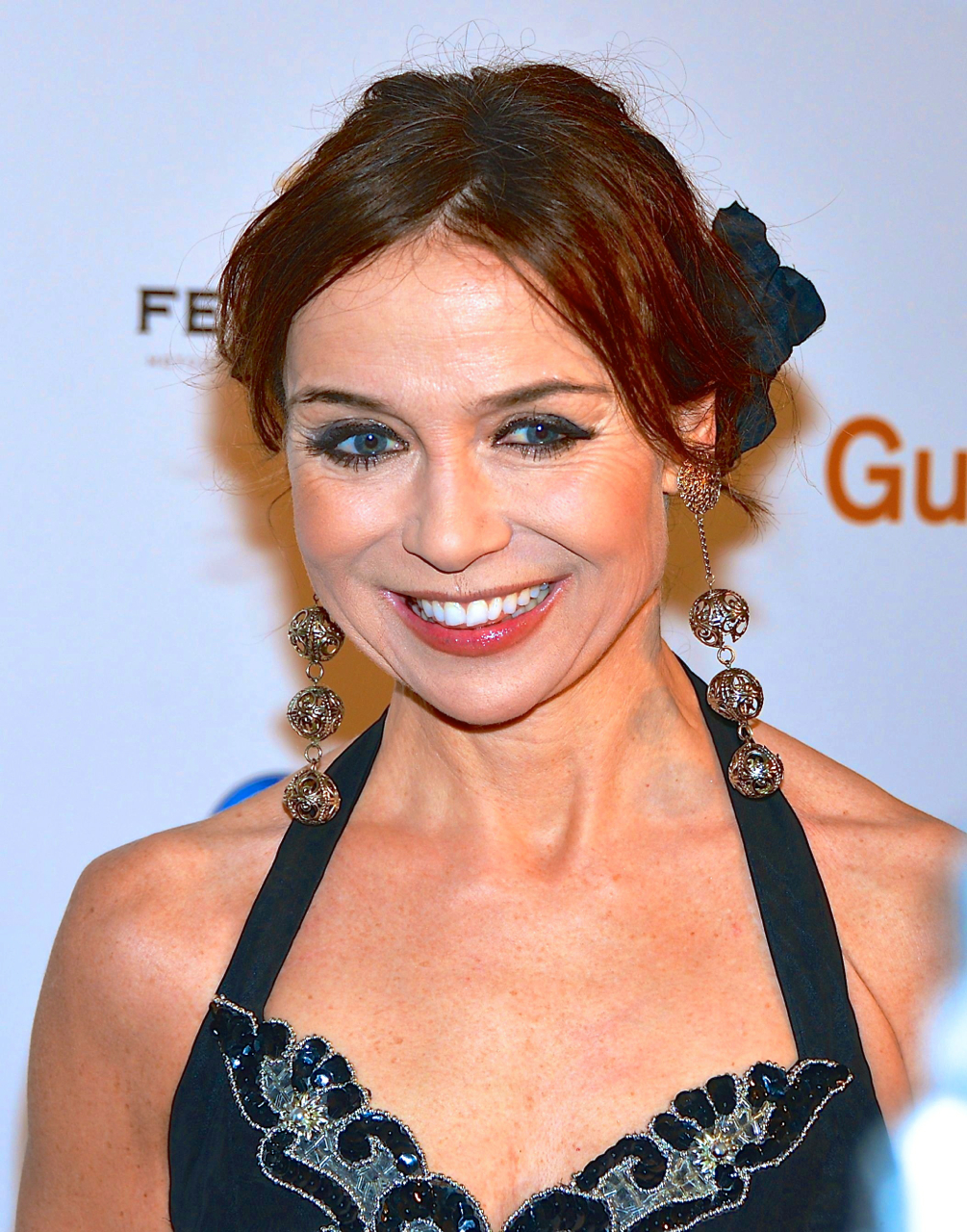
- Annika Jankell in January 2013
- Born: Annika Hildegard Jankell; 28 December 1961 (age 63); Stockholm, Sweden
- Occupation: Television presenter
- Partner(s): Thorsten Flinck (1991–1996); Ronnie Åström (2008–)
- Children: Félice Jankell; Happy Jankell

Annika Hildegard Jankell (born 28 December 1961) is a Swedish television host and journalist. Jankell has hosted Melodifestivalen 2005 and began her career by hosting the music show Listan between 1987 and 1990 on SVT.

== Personal life ==
Jankell has two children with actor Thorsten Flinck, Felice Jankell, born in 1992, and Happy Jankell, born in 1993.
