= Avalon (Swedish group) =

Band consisting of Djo Moupondo (aka as DJ Djo) and his brother Mohombi Moupondo

- Origin: Stockholm, Sweden
- Genres: Dancehall, Hip hop
- Years active: 1999–2008
- Labels: Sueco Production, La Clique Music
- Members: (Djo); Mohombi
- Website: myspace.com/groupavalon/

Avalon or Group Avalon was a band consisting of Djo Moupondo and his brother Mohombi Moupondo with Congolese and Swedish ancestry. A multilingual band, they performed songs in Swedish, French, English and Lingala. Mohombi has gone on to create a successful international solo career signing with RedOne. Djo is CEO of their label La Clique Music co founded with their longtime friend and Bruno Lopez with whom he also Co-manages Mohombi.

== Career ==
Djo and Mohombi born to a Congolese father and a Swedish mother were raised in the Democratic Republic of the Congo. Djo & Mohombi escaped the war-torn country for Stockholm, Sweden in 1998. The parents regularly exposed them to varied musical influences. Djo became a well-known DJ in local clubs and Mohombi studied at Rytmus Music High School in Stockholm and eventually obtaining his bachelor's degree in music and song from Stockholm Royal College of Music, the Stockholm conservatory. Djo obtained a Bachelor's degree in entrepreneurship at Södertörn University

They played music together for many years touring African and European countries, including forming the group Avalon, combining the dancehall and hip hop of the time with the distinctive African beats on which they were raised. From 2003 to 2008 the group sold over half a million records. It won the Best Diaspora Europe/Caribbean Group award at the All African Kora Awards, an African equivalent of Grammy awards.

In 2004 the group launched its debut album "Excalibur" including the songs "Le Monde Bouge", "Mama Africa" and "Ghetto"

In 2005, the group participated in Melodifestivalen, the race to the Eurovision Song Contest 2005 in Linköping, Sweden with the song "Big Up", a multilingual English / French song with an intro in Lingala coming sixth. Also in 2005, Avalon took part in the show "sthlm", an annual music festival held at Lava Kulturhuset.

They launched their album Afro-Viking targeting mainly the African music market on 21 December 2007. Avalon Group has collaborated with artists / songwriters such as Bob Sinclar, Million Stylez, Mohamed Lamine in Rai n B Fever, Silver Room, Alexander Papadimas, Marcus Landström and many others. They also shared stage with the likes of Ludacris, Angie Stone, Magic System, Sain supa crew, Montel Jordan, Musiq Soulchild among others.

== After split ==
In 2009, Mohombi went solo and was RedOne's first signing to 2101 Records/Universal and Cherrytree. He became most famous for his solo dancehall single "Bumpy Ride". Mohombi was Grammy Awarded in 2016 For his participation on Pitbull album Dale and again in 2018 as a co-songwriter of Mi Gente of J Balvin and Willy William.

== Discography ==
=== Albums ===
- 2004: Excalibur
- 2007: Afro-Viking

=== Singles ===
Title	Year	Peak positions	Notes
Title	Year	SWE	Notes
"Le Monde Bouge"	2003	–	
"Mama Africa"	2004	–	
"Big Up"	2005	32	Melodifestivalen 2005
"Pata Pata"	2005	41	
"Rotation"	2006	–	
"Fukama" (featuring Million Stylez)	2007	–	

== Awards ==
- In 1999, Stockholm Stad Musik, sport, dans och Poesie talang tävling "Winner"
- In 2002, the Show Stockholm Music contest by Royal College of Music, Stockholm "Winner"
- In 2003, the Kora awards for Diaspora Europe-Caribbean "Winner"
- In 2004, the Kora awards for Diaspora Europe-Caribbean "Nominated"
- In 2009, the Kora awards for Best African Act/Group "Nominated"
