= Camilla Brinck =

Swedish singer

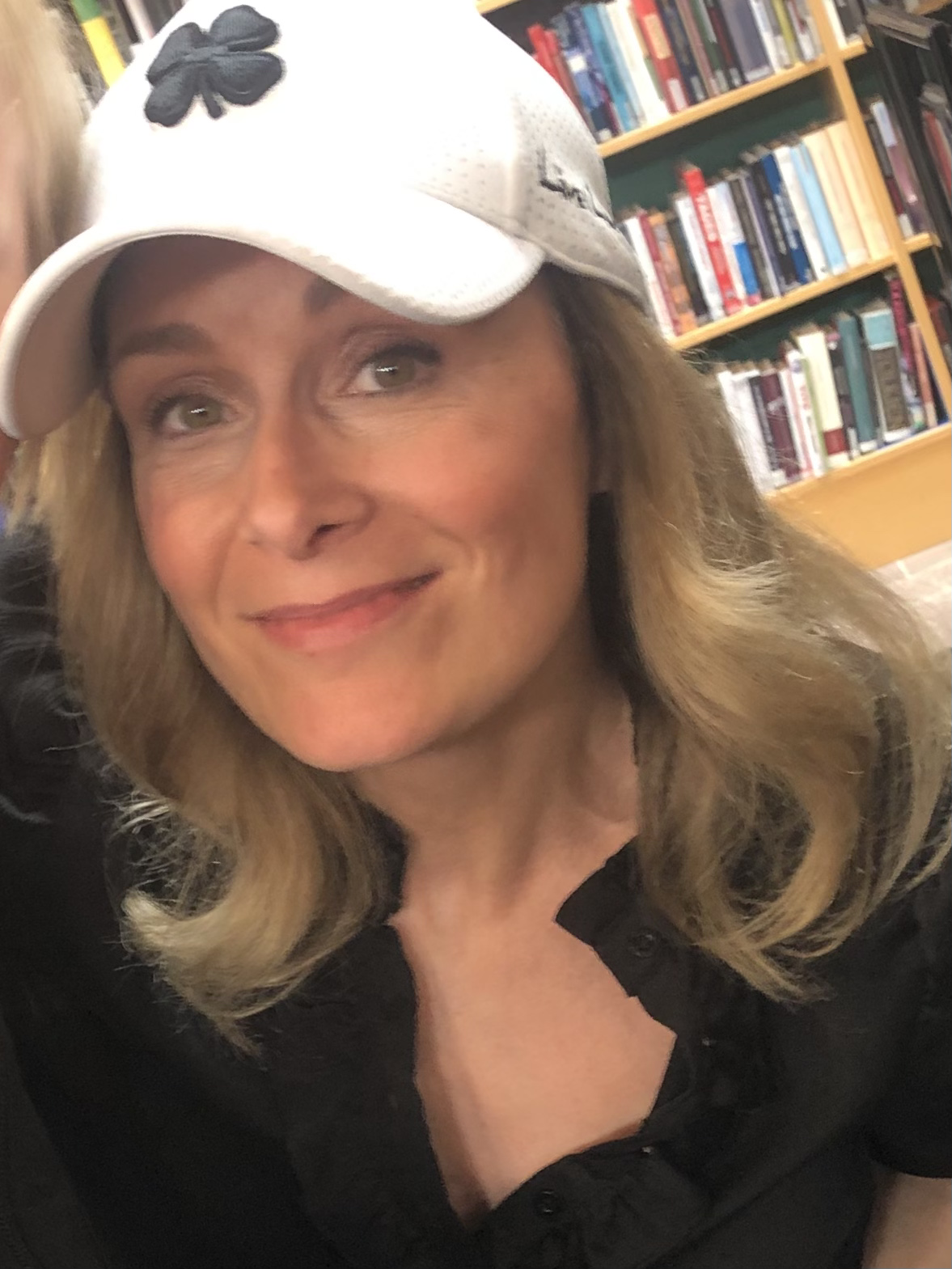

Background information
- Born: Camilla Therése Brinck; May 24, 1974 (age 51)
- Origin: Fittja, Sweden
- Occupation(s): Children's writer; entrepreneur and singer
- Years active: 2000–present
- Member of: Nouveau Riche
- Website: musseochhelium.se

Camilla Brinck (born 24 May 1974) is a Swedish singer, children's author, and entrepreneur.

She released her first album in the early 2000s. She is mostly known for her two singles "Bye Bye Forever (Chiki Chiki)" and "Tell Me". She participated in the semi-finals of Melodifestivalen 2005 with the song "Jenny", but failed to qualify for the final. In 2006, Brinck joined the Swedish pop band Nouveau Riche. Her debut album "Pink Trash" was released in 2007. The band has been inactive since 2008.

She has also written eight children's novels in the "Musse & Helium" series.

== Discography ==
=== Solo career ===
Studio albums

- Heaven (2001)

Singles & EP's

- Bye Bye Forever (Chiki Chiki) (2000)
- Tell Me (2001)
- Heaven (2001)
- Jenny (2002)

=== Nouveau Riche ===
Studio albums

- Pink Trash (2007)

Singles & EP's

- Oh Lord (2005)
- Hardcore Life (2006)
- Angels (2007)
- Stay (2007)
- Stay E.P. (2008)

== Bibliography ==
=== Children's literature ===
==== Musse & Helium (Micky & Helium) ====
- Mysteriet med hålet i väggen (The Mystery of the Hole in the Wall)
- Jakten på Guldosten (The Hunt for the Golden Cheese)
- Äventyret i Lindrizia (The Adventure in Lindrizia)
- I Duvjägarnas klor (In the Claws of the Pigeon Hunters)
- Den sista kampen (The Last Fight)
- Den hemlighetsfulla världen (The Secret World)
- En oväntad vändning (An Unexpected Twist)
- Uppdrag på djupt vatten (Missions in Deep Water)
