= Caroline Wennergren =

Swedish-Brazilian singer

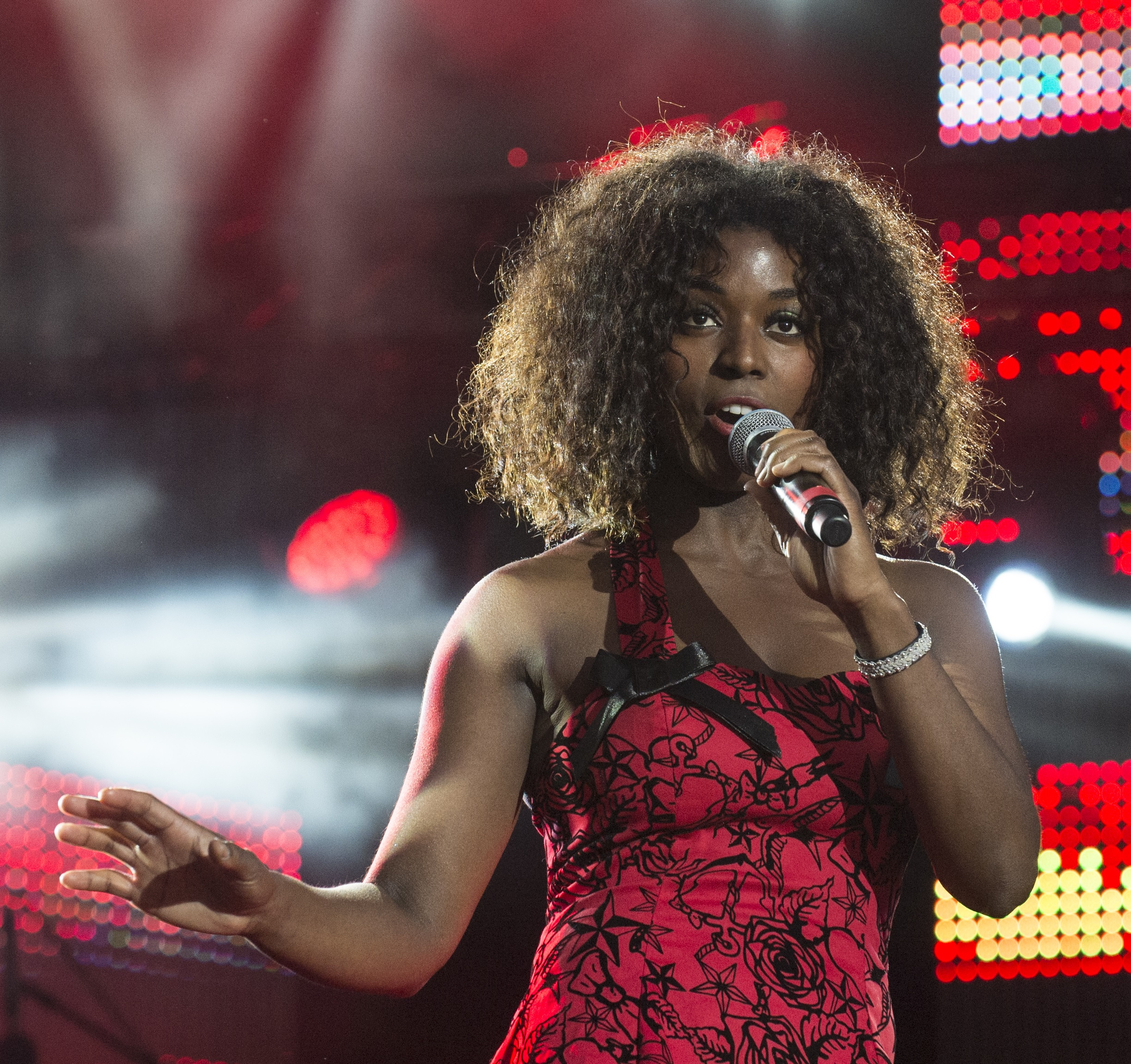
- Caroline Wennergren in 2014

Background information
- Born: 21 September 1985 (age 40); Rio de Janeiro, Brazil
- Genres: Pop; rock
- Occupation: Singer
- Years active: 2002–present

Caroline Wennergren (born 21 September 1985) is a Swedish-Brazilian singer. She participated at Melodifestivalen 2005 with the song A Different Kind of Love, which ended up fifth in the final. She participated in Melodifestivalen 2015 with the song Black Swan.

She was born on 21 September 1985 in Rio de Janeiro, Brazil. She and her younger brother were both adopted. She moved to Mölnlycke when she was five.

== Discography ==
=== Studio albums ===
- 2005 – Bossa Supernova
- 2011 – Drop me Off in Harlem

=== Singles ===
- 2005 – A Different Kind of Love
- 2005 – Doing the Bossa Supernova
- 2005 – You And I
- 2010 – "Love"
- 2011 – "A Tisket a Tasket"
