= Electric (Melody Club song) =

2002 song by Melody Club

Single by Melody Club

from the album Music Machine
- Released: November 2002
- Recorded: 2002
- Genre: Synthpop
- Label: Virgin Records
- Songwriter: Kristofer Östergren
- Producer: Dan Sundquist

Melody Club singles chronology
"Palace Station" (2002)	"Electric" (2002)	"Covergirl" (2003)

Music video
- "Electric" on YouTube

"Electric" is an English language single by Swedish pop/synth rock band Melody Club, taken from their 2002 debut album Music Machine. "Electric" was a follow-up single to their debut single "Palace Station" from the same album.

"Electric" was released in 2002 on Virgin Records and is produced by Dan Sundquist.

== Track list ==
1. "Electric" (Producer: Dan Sundquist) (4:00)
2. "In Motion" (2:39)

== Charts performance ==
It reached #18 on its first week of release, its highest position, staying for 20 weeks in the Swedish Singles Chart from 21 November 2002 until 3 April 2003.

Chart (2002–2003)	Peak position
Sweden (Sverigetopplistan)	18

== Remixes ==
In 2003, following the success of the song, Håkan Lidbo released a remix of the song again on Virgin Records Sweden

Track list

1. Electric (Radiowave Remix) (5:25)
2. Electric (Electrowave Remix) (4:46)

== Slava version ==
"Electric"

Single by Slava
- Released: 2010
- Recorded: 2010
- Genre: Dance-pop
- Label: Russia; Sweden: Warner Sweden and Extensive Music Sweden
- Songwriter: Kristofer Östergren

Music video
- "Electric" on YouTube

Slava (in Russian: Сла́ва), a Russian dance act, made a cover of the song in 2010. Released in Russia, it was also made available in Sweden as it is a cover of a popular Swedish band, and it features in the Slava version a Swedish singer Velvet. The Swedish release was on Warner Sweden and Extensive Music Sweden.

Track list:

1. "Electric" (Original Radio Version) (3:06)
2. "Electric" (Extended Version) (4:44)

== Cameron Cartio version ==
"Electric"

Single by Cameron Cartio
- Released: 2011
- Recorded: 2011
- Genre: Persian Pop music
- Label: Universal Music Group, Sherfa Music and Taraneh Records
- Songwriter: Kristofer Östergren

Music video
- "Electric" on YouTube

In 2011, Cameron Cartio, a Swedish pop star of Iranian origin made a cover of the song in Persian language from his upcoming second album. It is released on Universal Music Group, Sherfa Music Taraneh Records. Cartio also released a music video of the song directed by his brother Alec Cartio.
