= Music Machine (Melody Club album) =

Studio album by Melody Club
- Released: December 26, 2002
- Studio: Silence Studios, Atlantis Studios, Polar Studios
- Genre: New wave, nu-disco, synthpop, glam rock, synthrock
- Label: Virgin Records
- Producer: Dan Sundquist (tracks 1–3 and 5–11), Melody Club (track 4)

Melody Club chronology
Music Machine (2002)	Face the Music (2004)

Music Machine is the debut album by Melody Club released on December 26, 2002.

== Track listing ==
- All songs written by Kristofer Östergren. Published by Air Chrysalis Scandinavia.
1. "Covergirl"
2. "Stranded Love"
3. "Play Me In Stereo"
4. "Palace Station"
5. "Let's Kill the Clockwork"
6. "My Soft Return"
7. "Put Your Arms Around Me"
8. "Electric"
9. "Colours"
10. "Angeleyes"
11. "Golden Day"

== Personnel ==
- Kristofer Östergren: Vocals
- Erik Stenemo: Acoustic and Electric Guitars
- Jon Axelson: Keyboards, Synthesizers
- Magnus Roos: Bass
- Richard Ankers: Drums, Percussion

== Chart positions ==
Chart (2002–2003)	Peak position
Norway (VG-lista)	17
Sweden (Sverigetopplistan)	1
