= Johanna Westman =

Swedish children's book author and television host

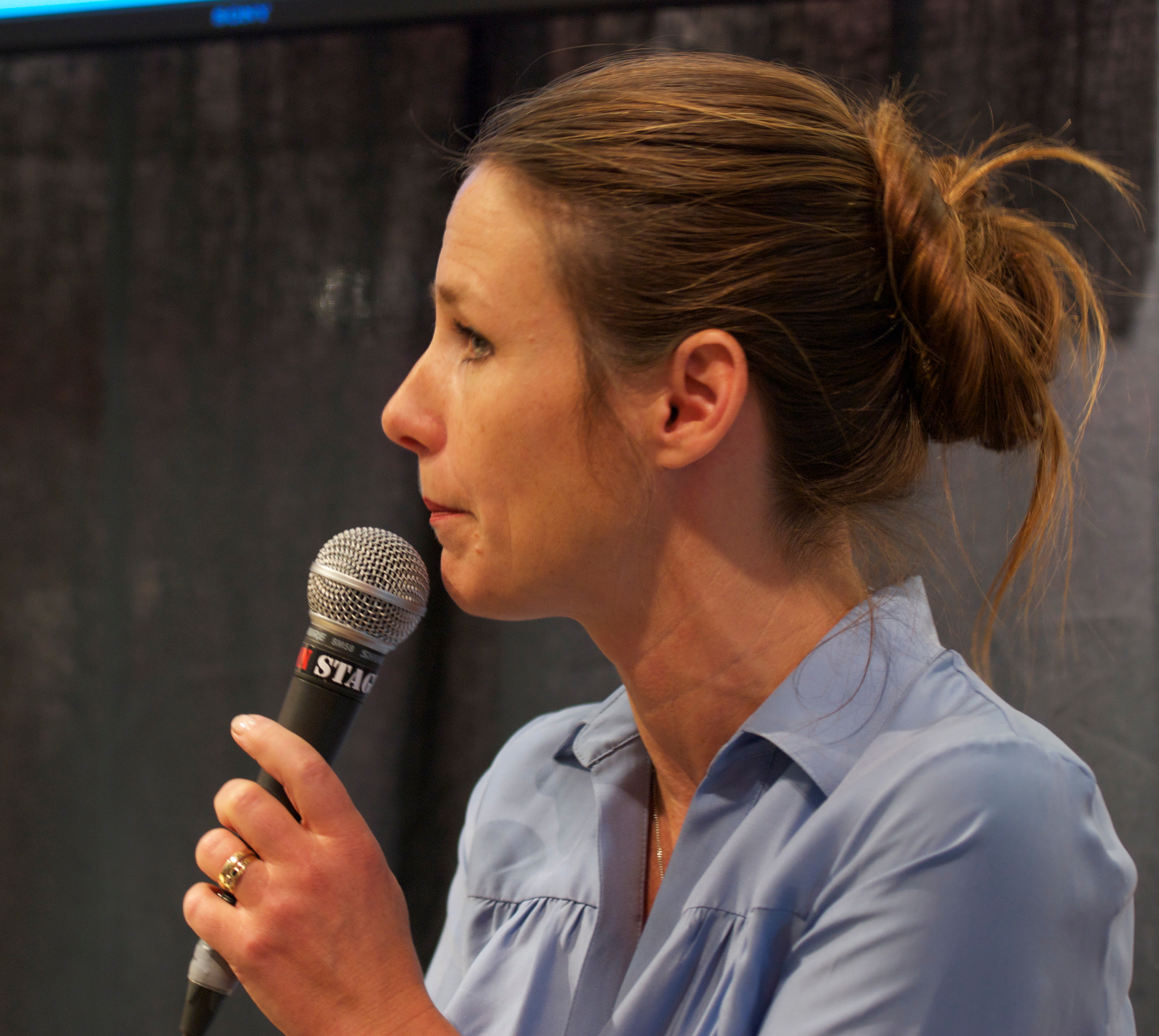
- Johanna Westman during the Göteborg Book Fair in September 2011

Johanna Cecilia Westman (born 11 August 1969 in Tranås, Sweden) is a Swedish children's book author and television host. She presented the 3rd semifinal of Melodifestivalen 2005.

== Bibliography ==
=== Children's books ===
- 1999 - Resor med Byron (illustrator: Charlotte Ramel)
- 2000 - Jesus och jag - Byrons berättelser (illustrator: Charlotte Ramel)

=== Cookbooks ===
- 2001 - Födelsedagsboken med recept på 12 bakelser
- 2001 - Första kokboken (illustrator: Catharina Tham, photographer: Eva Ankarvall)
- 2003 - Första bakboken (illustrator: Catharina Tham, photographer: Eva Ankarvall)
- 2004 - Första kokboken i världen (illustrator: Catharina Tham, photographer: Eva Ankarvall)
- 2005 - Italienskt! Hemma hos Johanna (illustrator: Cecilia Nilson, photographer: Klas Hjertberg)
- 2006 - Minsta kokboken (with Astrid Bobo Gandini, photographer: Eva Ankarvall, designer: Sarah Sheppard)
- 2007 - Första och andra mosboken (illustrator: Kenneth Andersson, designer: Ebba Bonde)
- 2008 - Julgodis för stora och små sockerbagare (photographer: Eva Ankarvall)
- 2009 - Nya första kokboken (illustrator: Catharina Tham, photographer: Eva Ankarvall)
