= Nouveau Riche (Swedish band) =

Swedish musical group

- Origin: Sweden
- Genres: Pop, Eurodance
- Years active: 2005–2008
- Labels: Pick Up Music
- Members: Ulrich Bermsjö; Camilla Brinck
- Past members: Dominika Peczynski
- Website: Official website

Nouveau Riche (NR) was a musical group which included Ulrich Bermsjö and Dominika Peczynski, who was later replaced by Camilla Brinck. The group was created by Bermsjö and Peczynski, an ex-member of Army Of Lovers, in 2005.

Their debut single "Oh Lord", written by Bermsjö and Mattias Lindblom together with Anders Wollbeck from Vacuum, was released in November 2005. It was followed by the single "Hardcore Life", after which Peczynski decided to leave the band. While for a short period the future of Nouveau Riche seemed uncertain, Pick Up Music announced the group would continue with Camilla Brinck replacing Peczynski.

The first single with Camilla in the group was "Angels", and the debut album "Pink Trash" was subsequently released.

Their website and Myspace page make no mention of Peczynski or the fact that there have been two previous singles before "Angels" and when Camilla joined the group. Pick Up Music have not issued any statements regarding this.

There has been no news or new material issued by the group since the single "Stay", for which there was no physical release, in 2007, but in December 2008, American label ISV Entertainment released the "Stay E.P.", a collection of remixes for the song and previously released and unreleased mixes for other album songs.

== Band members ==
=== Last known line-up ===
- Ulrich Bermsjö (2005–2008)
- Camilla Brinck (2006–2008)

=== Previous members ===
- Dominika Peczynski (2005–2006)

== Discography ==
=== Studio albums ===
- Pink Trash (2007)

=== Singles & EP's ===
- Oh Lord (2005)
- Hardcore Life (2006)
- Angels (2007)
- Stay (2007)
- Stay E.P. (2008)

== Videography ==
=== Promotional videos ===
- Oh Lord (2005)
- Angels (2007)
- Stay (2007)

== Related artists ==
- Army of Lovers
- Vacuum
- BWO

== See also ==
- List of Swedes in music
