= At Your Service (Melody Club album) =

Greatest hits album by Melody Club
- Released: 21 August 2007
- Recorded: 2002–2004
- Genre: New wave, nu-disco, synthpop, glam rock, synthrock

Melody Club chronology
Scream (2006)	At Your Service (2007)	Goodbye to Romance (2009)

At Your Service is a greatest hits album by Melody Club released on August 21, 2007.

== Track listing ==
1. Palace Station
2. Take Me Away
3. Covergirl
4. Baby
5. Killing a Boy
6. Cats in the Dark
7. Stranded Love
8. Breakaway
9. Let's Kill the Clockwork
10. Electric
11. Play Me in Stereo
12. Wildhearts
