= Cameron Cartio =

Swedish singer (born 1978)

- Also known as: Cameron
- Born: Kamran Sabahi; 9 April 1978 (age 48)
- Origin: Iran / Sweden
- Genres: Pop, Persian/Middle Eastern music
- Occupation: Singer
- Years active: 2005–present
- Labels: Sony Music; Universal Music Group; Taraneh Records; Sherfa Music; Avang Music

Kamran Sabahi (Persian: کامران صباحی; born 9 April 1978), known professionally as Cameron Cartio, is an Iranian-born Swedish pop singer.

Being signed to Sony Music, he released his debut album Borderless in 2005. Cameron having been signed earlier to Taraneh Records and Sherfa Music is now signed to Avang Music and has a publishing deal with Universal Music Group Scandinavia and is working on his new songs. He remains popular in Iran, Sweden, as well as in the Iranian diaspora.

== Career ==
Cameron Cartio started his music career in Sweden. He speaks and sings in different languages, including Persian, English, and Spanish; the latter was learned in Spain where he lived for some time. Coming from an artistic family certainly helped as well in his musical career. His brother Alec Cartio, is a music producer and music video director.

Cameron Cartio made his debut in Melodifestivalen 2005 with his song "Roma". The lyrics of "Roma" were written in a conlang, a made-up language by Cameron Cartio, "borderless language of love" as he called it. He also made a Spanish language version of the same song. He reached to "Andra chansen" (Second Chance) stage of the competition after qualifying in the Linköping semi-final on 19 February 2005. Singing in the "second chance" qualifying round on 6 March 2005, he failed to reach the finals. But the song proved popular with the Swedish audiences and the single made it to the Top 5 of the Swedish Sverigetopplistan music charts peaking at No. 4 in April 2005.

He followed "Roma" with his first studio album Borderless that included notably, besides "Roma" a duo featuring rai singer Khaled. The song entitled "Henna" is in Arabic and in Persian. Cameron and Khaled also released an Arabic/Spanish version on a maxi CD for Spain in 2006. His song "Henna" (partly in Arabic) and his collaboration with Cheb Khaled made him popular throughout the Arab World. He also found success with the catchy hit "Ni Na Nay". The bilingual English/Spanish "Don't Tell Me Tonight" a song with Edurne made it to the Top 40 on the Greek radio charts. On the album Borderless Cameron worked with the songwriters and producers Alex P and Marcus Englof on the majority of the album.

He was signed with Universal Music Group, Sherfa Music and Taraneh Records. In 2011, he released a dance hit "Electric", a Persian language cover of Melody Club song.

In December 2019, Cameron released his new single "Bespar be Khoda" (Leave it to God). A spiritual pop song dedicated to God. Cameron Cartio – Bespar Be Khoda Song | کامرون کارتیو بسپار به خدا Cameron Cartio is now signed to Avang Music and has released the song "Avalo Akhar".

=== Collaborations ===
Under the name Cameron, he released "You Keep Me Hanging On" produced by Anders Nyman, Cameron Cartio, Robin Rex. The release also included "You Keep Me Hanging On (Remix)" produced by Cameron Cartio himself

He also collaborated with the raï singer Khaled in his hit "Henna" that reached number 9 in Sweden and charted in the Netherlands and Belgium. Khaled and Cameron performed the song Henna at the European Athletics Championship 2006 held in Goteborg, Sweden for an estimated 100.000 live audience. The performance was broadcast by all European National Televisions.

Another collaboration was with the Lebanese-Greek Cypriot Sarbel in "Mi Chica" a simultaneous double hit for Sarbel in Greek featuring Cameron Cartio (in Persian) and a separate hit for Cameron Cartio version all in Persian.

Cartio is featured in an English language hit "Don't Tell Me Tonight" with Spanish pop singer Edurne

Cartio has partnered up with music producer Hamid Shekari who has previously worked with the Canadian artist Massari. Shekari worked with the Swedish artist Mohombi on the remix track for "Mr. Lover Man" Cameron and Hamid Shekari are currently working on new tracks for Cameron's upcoming album. Album release is expected sometime in the fall of 2020.

== Personal life ==
Cameron Cartio currently lives in California and is married to Delaram Cartio, they have two sons together. He and his brother Alec Cartio owned a Swedish pizza house in Santa Monica, Los Angeles until 2017.

Cartio is involved in charities for third world countries' poverty prevention and children's rights. The latest charity involvement was in October 2019 in Beverly Hills, CA in association with Global Charity Initiative.

== Discography ==
=== Albums ===
- 2006: Borderless

Title and details
Borderless
- Type: Album
- Released: 2006
Notes

No.	Title	Length
1.	"Ni Na Nay"	3:04
2.	"Henna" (featuring Khaled)	3:13
3.	"Sandy"	3:49
4.	"Leyli"	3:01
5.	"Roma"	3:03
6.	"Ironiam"	3:36
7.	"Madaram"	3:26
8.	"Barone"	3:09
9.	"Toi Azizam"	3:15
10.	"Roma" (remix)	3:02
11.	"Henna" (extended)	3:53
12.	"Roma (music video)" (bonus)
13.	"Henna (music video)" (bonus)

In 2006 Sony BMG released the album with a slightly different track list and including a recording of "Don't Tell Me Tonight" featuring the Spanish singer Edurne. The 2006 release also includes the track "Mi Chica" (not found on the 2005 release), in replacement of "Ni Na Nay" that is absent from the new 2006 rerelease. "Mi Chica" is a common hit also recorded by Sarbel in Greece in a Greek version that features Cameron Cartio's voice.

Title and details
Borderless
- Type: Album
- Record label: Sony MBG
- Released: 2006
Notes

No.	Title	Length
1.	"Henna (Spanish Version)" (featuring Khaled)
2.	"Mi Chica"
3.	"Don't Tell Me Tonight" (featuring Edurne)
4.	"Roma (Spanish version)"
5.	"Ni Na Nay"
6.	"Barone"
7.	"Madaram"
8.	"Barone"
9.	"Ironiam"
10.	"Sandy"
11.	"Leyli"
12.	"Henna (original version)" (featuring Khaled)

=== Singles ===
Title	Year	Peak positions		
Title	Year	SWE	BEL (Fl) (Ultratip)	NED Single Top 100
"Roma"	2005	4	—	—
"Henna" (Cameron featuring Khaled)	2005	9	8*	86

* Appeared in the bubbling under Belgian Ultratip chart but not in the main Ultratop chart.

=== Songs / Music videos ===
- 2005: "Roma" (for Melodifestivalen)
  - 2005: "Roma" (Spanish version)
- 2005: "Henna" (with Khaled)
  - 2006: "Henna (Spanish version with Khaled)
- 2006: "Barone"
- 2006: "Ni Na Nay"
- 2006: "Mi Chica" (with Sarbel)
- 2011: "Electric"
- 2011: "Bia Nazdiktar"
  - 2012: "Cuando Volveras" (Spanish version of "Bia Nazdiktar")
- 2012: "Sheytoonaki" (feat. Maria Manson)
- 2012: "Ye Divone"
- 2015: "Delam Asireh"
- 2019: "Beresoon"
- 2019: "Bespar be Khoda" (meaning Leave it to God)
- 2020: "Che Khoobe Injaei"
- 2021: "Avalo Akhar"

=== Official Remixes ===
- 2011: "Electric" (Ali Payami Remix)
- 2012: "Ye divoone" (Ali Payami Remix)
- 2018: "Irooniam" (World Cup 2018 Hamid Shekari Remix)

=== Featured in ===
- 2013: "Don't Tell Me Tonight" (Edurne featuring Cameron Cartio)
