= Alla flickor =

Single by Linda Bengtzing

from the album Ingenting att Förlora
- Released: March 2005 (Sweden)
- Recorded: 2004
- Genre: pop
- Length: 2:49
- Label: M&L Records
- Songwriters: Tim Larsson; Johan Fransson; Tobias Lundgren; Niklas Edberger

Linda Bengtzing singles chronology
"Alla flickor" (2005)	"Diamanter" (2005)

"Alla flickor" ("All the girls") is a 2005 single from Swedish pop singer Linda Bengtzing released after her participation at Melodifestivalen 2005 during the first quarter of 2005. At Svensktoppen, the song stayed for eight weeks during the time 1 May 2005 – 26 June 2005, peaking at number seven. The song also peaked at number eight on the Swedish Singles Chart.

The song was originally recorded by Pernilla Wahlgren, who showed interest in performing this at Melodifestivalen, however, the artist director, Christer Björkman, required a younger singer, therefore Bengtzing was selected. Later, Lotta Engberg was intended to perform the song, until Edward af Sillén claimed that Lotta Engberg (born 5 March 1963) by 2005 no longer could be considered a "girl".

== Controversial spoof video ==
The song caused some controversy on website YouTube where a spoof video had been uploaded featuring footage of Nazi Germany synchronized with the song's lyrics, implying it was Adolf Hitler who gave "all girls" what they wanted. Linda Bengtzing, who initially had been unaware of the video's existence, found it to be in very bad taste, denied anything to do with the video, and denied the lyrics of the track (which are very typical schlager lyrics) had anything to do with Hitler or the Nazis. This video was removed from YouTube, which has been reposted and removed several times after being reported.

== Charts ==
=== Weekly charts ===
Chart (2005)	Peak position
Sweden (Sverigetopplistan)	8

=== Year-end charts ===
Chart (2005)	Position
Sweden (Sverigetopplistan)	32

== See also ==
- Melodifestivalen 2005
