= Vi kan gunga =

Single by Jimmy Jansson

from the album Som en blixt
- A-side: "Vi kan gunga"
- B-side: "Du har förlorat"
- Released: 2005
- Genre: Pop
- Label: M&L Records
- Songwriter(s): Niklas Edberger, Johan Fransson, Tim Larsson, Tobias Lundgren

Jimmy Jansson singles chronology
"God morgon, världen" (2004)	"Vi kan gunga" (2005)	"Amanda" (2007)

"Vi kan gunga" is a song written by Niklas Edberger, Johan Fransson and Tim Larsson, Tobias Lundgren, and performed by Jimmy Jansson at Melodifestivalen 2005. From the competition in Skellefteå on 26 February 2005, the song went further to the final inside the Stockholm Globe Arena. Once there, on 12 March 2005, it ended up in sixth place.

The single topped the Swedish singles chart, and also charted at Svensktoppen for three weeks between 10 April -24 April 2005-, with a 5th, a 6th and one 10th position, before leaving the chart.

== Charts ==
Chart (2005)	Peak position
Sweden (Sverigetopplistan)	1
