= Rickard Engfors =

Swedish model, stylist and drag queen

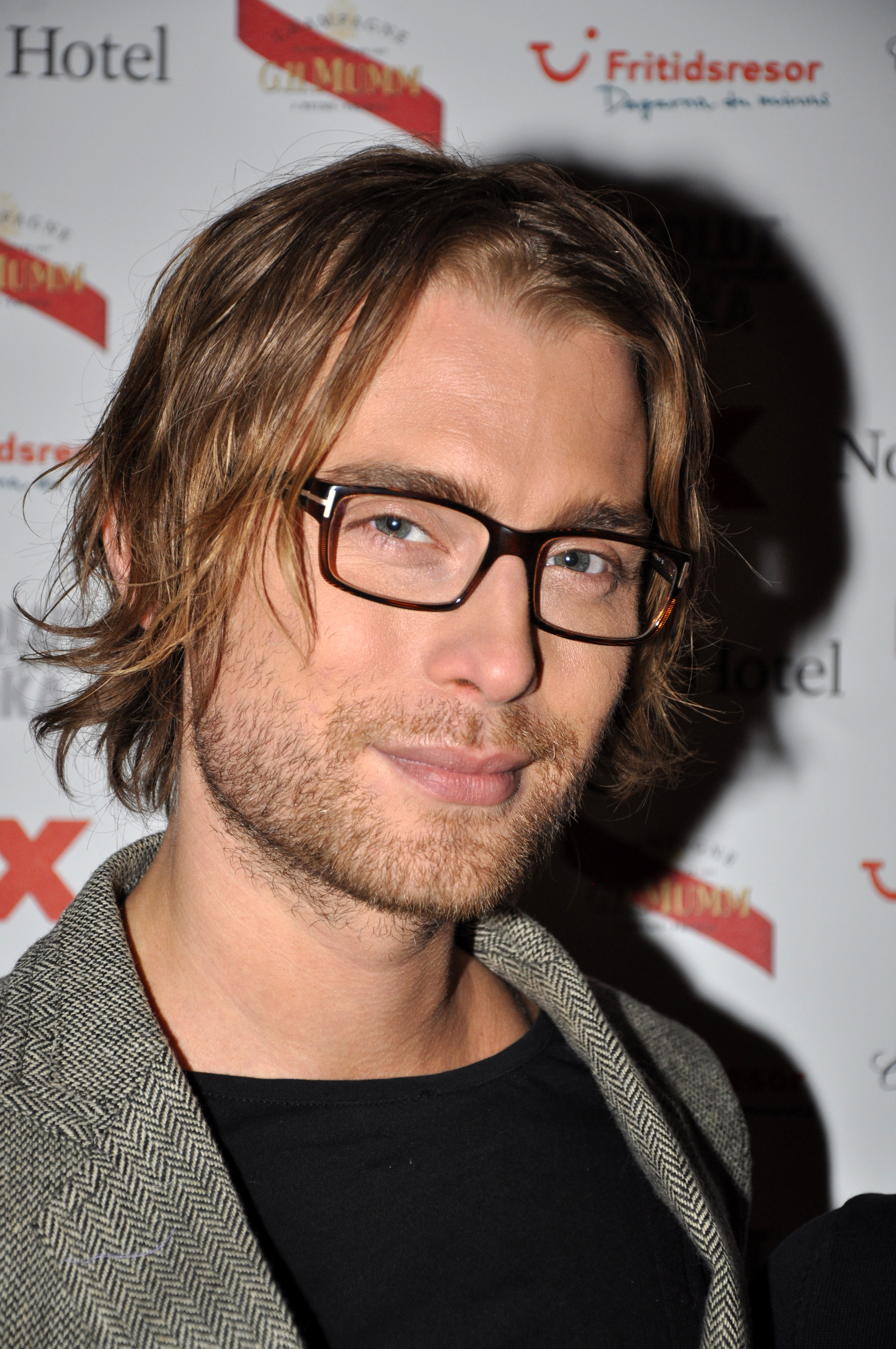
- Rickard Engfors at the Gaygalan Awards in 2011
- Born: 22 November 1976 (age 48); Stockholm, Sweden
- Occupation(s): Model and stylist

Rickard Engfors (born 22 November 1976) is a Swedish model, stylist and former drag queen.

His career began in 1996 as an artist in Swedish drag troupe After Dark and he was quickly appointed to "Christer Lindarws crown prince" and was also known as "Sweden's best looking girl". He has performed for royalty, won awards for his artistic efforts and shared the stage with many of Sweden's most beloved artists.

He acts as female lead singer in the music video of the 2003 single Pass This On by The Knife. In 2004 the Swedish fashion house Panos Emporio chose Rickard as its house model for a swimwear range, which caused so much controversy that it was re-shot using a Greek model called Aleka.

Engfors participated in Melodifestivalen 2005 with the song "Ready for Me".

== See also ==
Scandinavian drag artists

- After Dark (Sweden)
- Queentastic (Norway)
