= Michael Leijnegard =

Swedish journalist and television presenter

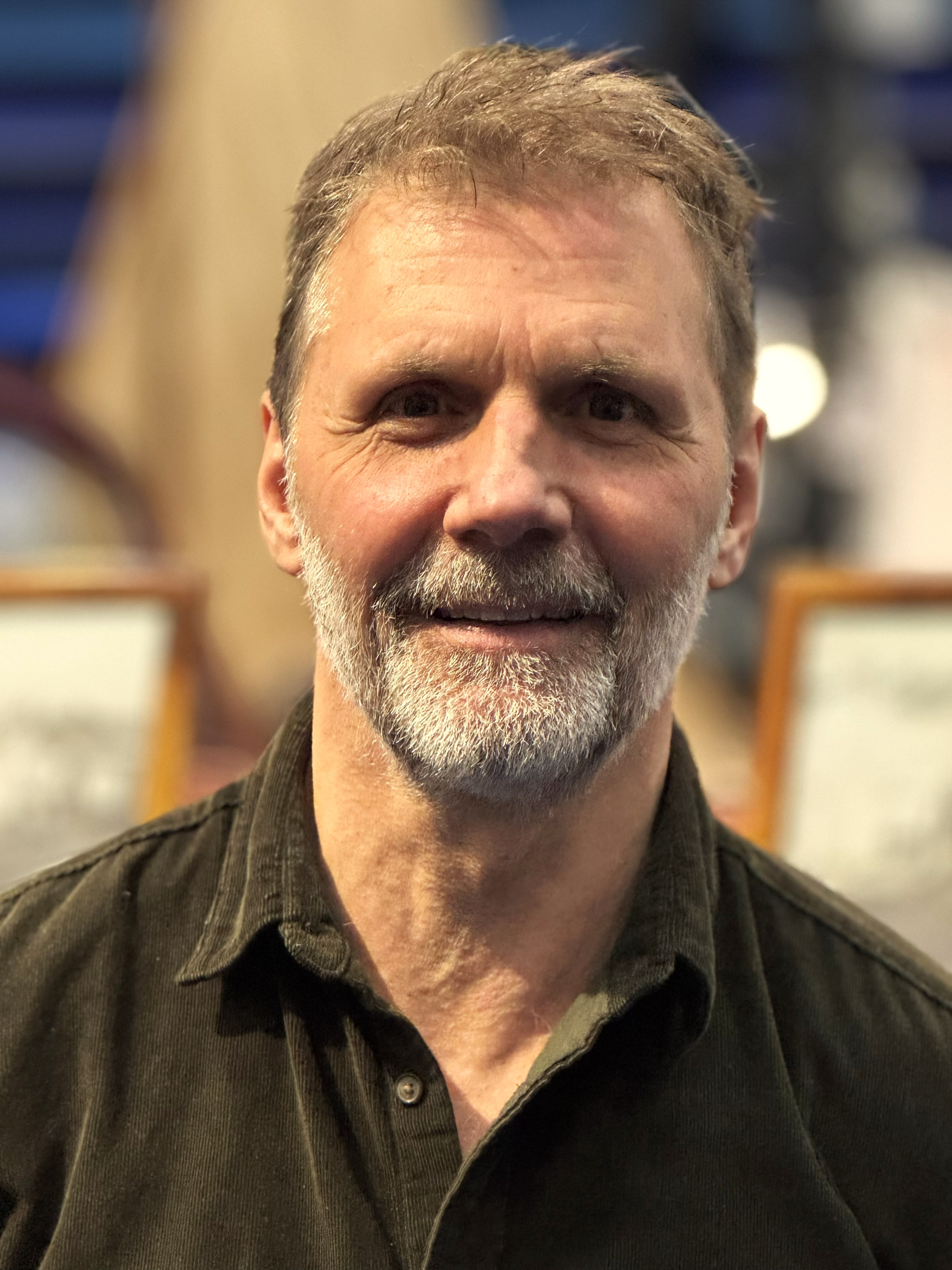
Micke Leijnegard in 2025

Lars-Michael "Micke" Leijnegard, (born 11 August 1964 in Sävsjö) is a Swedish journalist and television presenter for SVT. Leijengard has hosted Gomorron Sverige and Mästarnas mästare.
