= Scream (Melody Club album) =

Studio album by Melody Club
- Released: November 8, 2006
- Genre: New wave, nu-disco, synthpop, glam rock, synthrock
- Producer: Klas Åhlund, Marco Manieri, Melody Club, Thomas Troelsen

Melody Club chronology
Face the Music (2004)	Scream (2006)	At Your Service (2007)

Scream is the third studio album by Swedish synthrock band Melody Club. It was first released on November 8, 2006.

== Track listing ==
1. Feed on Me
2. Last Girl on My Mind
3. Crash
4. Scream
5. Destiny Calling
6. Fever Fever
7. Sweet Thing
8. Walk of Love
9. Don't Fake the Real Thing
10. You Are Not Alone
11. Evil Thing
- Their song "Fever Fever" also featured in EA Sports game, FIFA 08.

== Chart positions ==
Chart (2006–2007)	Peak position
Sweden	18
