= Alexandra Pascalidou =

Greek-Swedish journalist and media personality

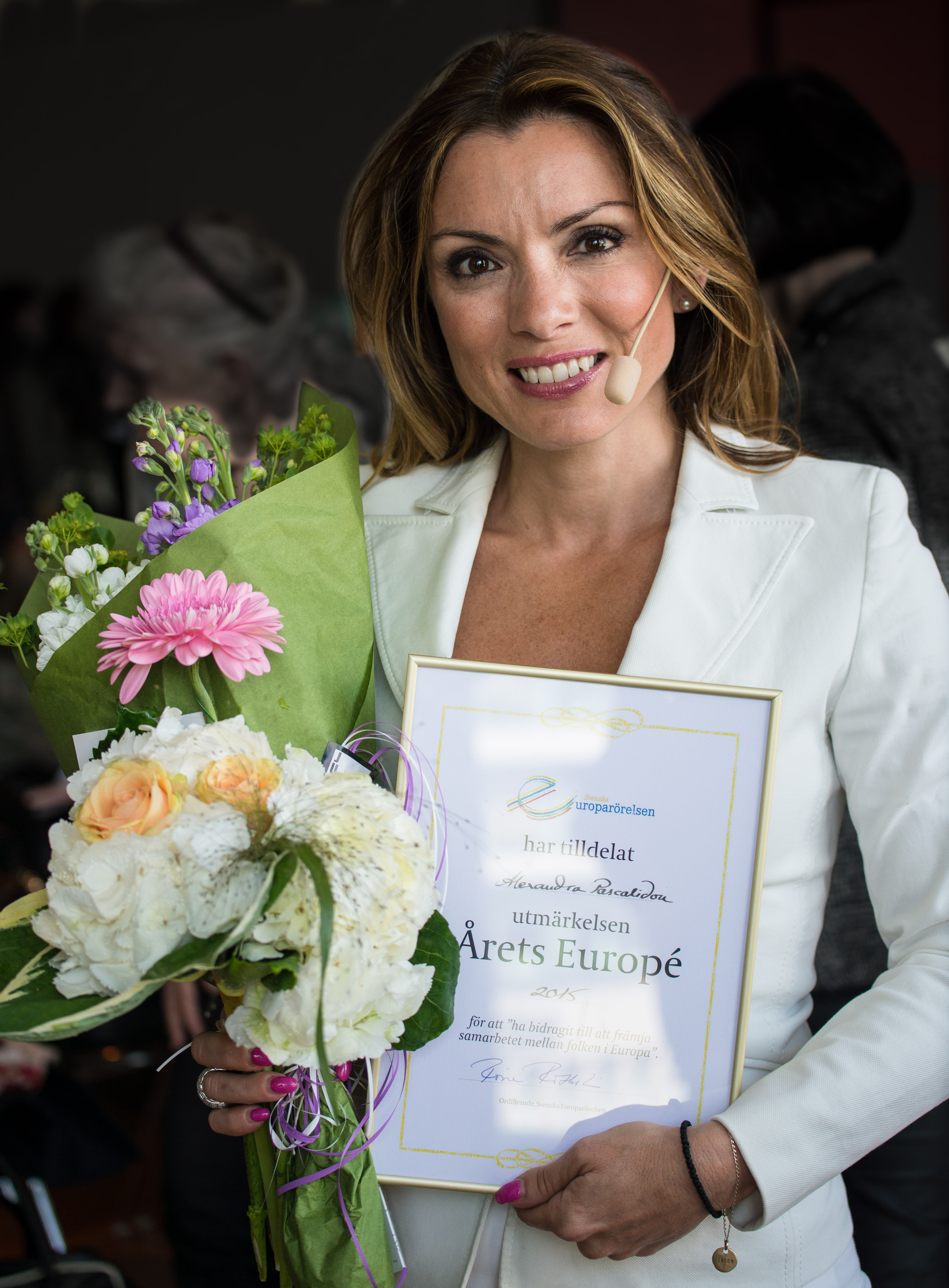
- Pascalidou in Stockholm after being appointed "European of the Year" in May 2015
- Born: 17 July 1970 (age 55); Bucharest, Romania
- Occupations: columnist, television hostess and author

Alexandra Pascalidou (Greek: Αλεξάνδρα Πασχαλίδου; born 17 July 1970) is a Greek-Swedish journalist, television and radio presenter and author. She is also a frequent lecturer and human rights activist.

== Life and career ==
Pascalidou became known to the public in 1995 when she began hosting the multicultural television show Mosaik on SVT, one of Sweden's public service channels. Along with Michael Alonzo, Dogge Doggelito, and Cissi Elwin, Pascalidou was a prominent figure in the Swedish part of Europarådet's anti-racism campaign "All Different All Equal", known in Sweden under the working title "Youth Against Racism"(UMR) in the mid-1990s. In 2000–01 she hosted Som sagt on SVT, a Saturday night programme with a focus on literature and language topics. At the same time, she was a producer and reporter for the television show Striptease that focused on investigative journalism.

In 2004, Pascalidou hosted the Olympics in Athens for SVT, following which she lived in Greece for two years, hosting various television shows including, for example, Friday night entertainment on ERT covering a day spent with such well-known personalities as Roberto Cavalli, Isabel Allende, and Roger Moore, among others. She also hosted a three-hour live Greek morning television programme every day. She was the hostess for the Eurovision Song Contest in Greece in 2005, and a commentator in Kyiv the year when Greece won the competition for the first time. In the same year Pascalidou hosted Melodifestivalen in Sweden from Gothenburg.

In January 2007, she became one of five hostesses of Sweden's TV4's Förkväll, a daytime lifestyle program. She participated in the show Pokermiljonen on TV4 and was hostess for a series of charity galas on SVT, for example, På flykt with Kjell Lönnå and Uppesittarkväll with Anders Lundin.

Pascalidou is a columnist and freelance writer in newspapers such as GP and Expressen. She has blogged continually on Metrobloggen until the newspaper ended their relationship. She gives lectures on diversity and the media, democracy and justice issues, rhetoric and leadership, gender and cultural competence.

She has also served on the Board of BRIS (Children's Rights in Society) and the board of Kvinnojouren Terrafem working with women's rights against men's violence. She is involved in women's health and is a member of the 2.6 Miljoner Klubben and a mom's ambassador to RFSUs campaign. She sits on the board of the foundation.

It was announced on 21 January 2016, that Pascalidou would host the semi-final allocation draw for Eurovision 2016, along with Jovan Radomir, in Stockholm, Sweden.

Pascalidou is the founder of New Academy.

== Plagiarism and ghost writing ==
Alexandra has been accused several times of plagiarism and using ghost writers. Two instances of plagiarism have been exposed: in 2003 she copied large parts of text written by the journalist Daniel Hernandez for the Los Angeles Times and in 2015 it was revealed that she had translated a Turkish poem by Aziz Nesin and published under her own name. In connection to the latter incident Pascalidou's collaboration with the newspaper Metro was terminated. The details behind the termination was not revealed by neither Metro nor Pascalidou, but the column in question was removed from Metro's archive.

== Bibliography ==
- Mammorna (Mothers) Bokförlaget Atlas AB, Stockholm, 2018. ISBN 978-9173896085
- me too : Så går vi vidare Röster, redskap och råd (Me Too –Then We Proceed to Voices, Tools and Advice) Lava Förlag, Stockholm, 2017. ISBN 978-9188529848
- Kaos : ett grekiskt krislexikon (CHAOS: A Greek Crisis Icon) Bokförlaget Atlas AB, Stockholm, 2014. ISBN 978-9173894418
- My Big Fat Greek Cookbook (2010) Bonnier fakta
- Taxi Bokförlaget Atlas AB, Stockholm, 2008. ISBN 978-9173895187 Interviews with taxi drivers around the world, from Nairobi to New York. Also available in Greek (Psychogios Publications). This book was broadcast on radio P1, P3 and P4, where Alexandra directed Sweden's leading actors including Michael Nyqvist, Samuel Fröler, David Dencik, and Andreas Wilson.
- Frontkick Bokförlaget Atlas AB, Stockholm, 2003. ISBN 978-9173891240 Stories from Pascalidou's inquiries in the areas of racism, terrorism, media, democracy, and so on.
- Cross-Roads: voices from suburban cultures (2002). In-depth interviews with famous Swedish artists who grew up in suburbia. For example, Joakim Thåström, Jerry Williams, Metallica, Dogge, and others.
- Bortom mammas gata (Beyond My Mom's Street) Bokförlaget Atlas AB, Stockholm, 2008. ISBN 978-9173893718 An autobiographical book about growing up in one of Sweden's poorest neighborhoods. The book was hailed by critics and used in schools. The book was translated into Greek by publisher Oceanida.

== Awards ==
- 2018 – The Bellman Prize
- 2018 – The St Eriks Medal
- 2017 – The 5i12 Prize
- 2016 – Nominated for Kristallen and the Big Journalist Award. Nominated for the Big Journalist Prize in the Category Storyteller of the Year : Lisa Jarenskog and Alexandra Pascalidou, for the documentary series They Call Us Beggars on Swedish TV, SVT.
- 2016 – The Big Feminist Award
- 2015 – European of the Year
- 2014 – Postkodmiljonären Won a million SEK with Lena Ag and donated the money to Kvinna till Kvinna.
- 2002 – The Swedish PEN-club Berns prize
- 2002 – The Union of Civil Servants’ Working Award
- 2002 – Kommunal, the Swedish Municipal Workers’ Union's Culture Award
- 2000 – Integration Award
- 1998 – The Immigrant Institute's Merit Award

== In popular culture ==
- The Girl with the Dragon Tattoo (2009). Pascalidou appeared briefly in this film as a Swedish TV reporter covering the protagonist's trial.
