= Melody Club =

Swedish band

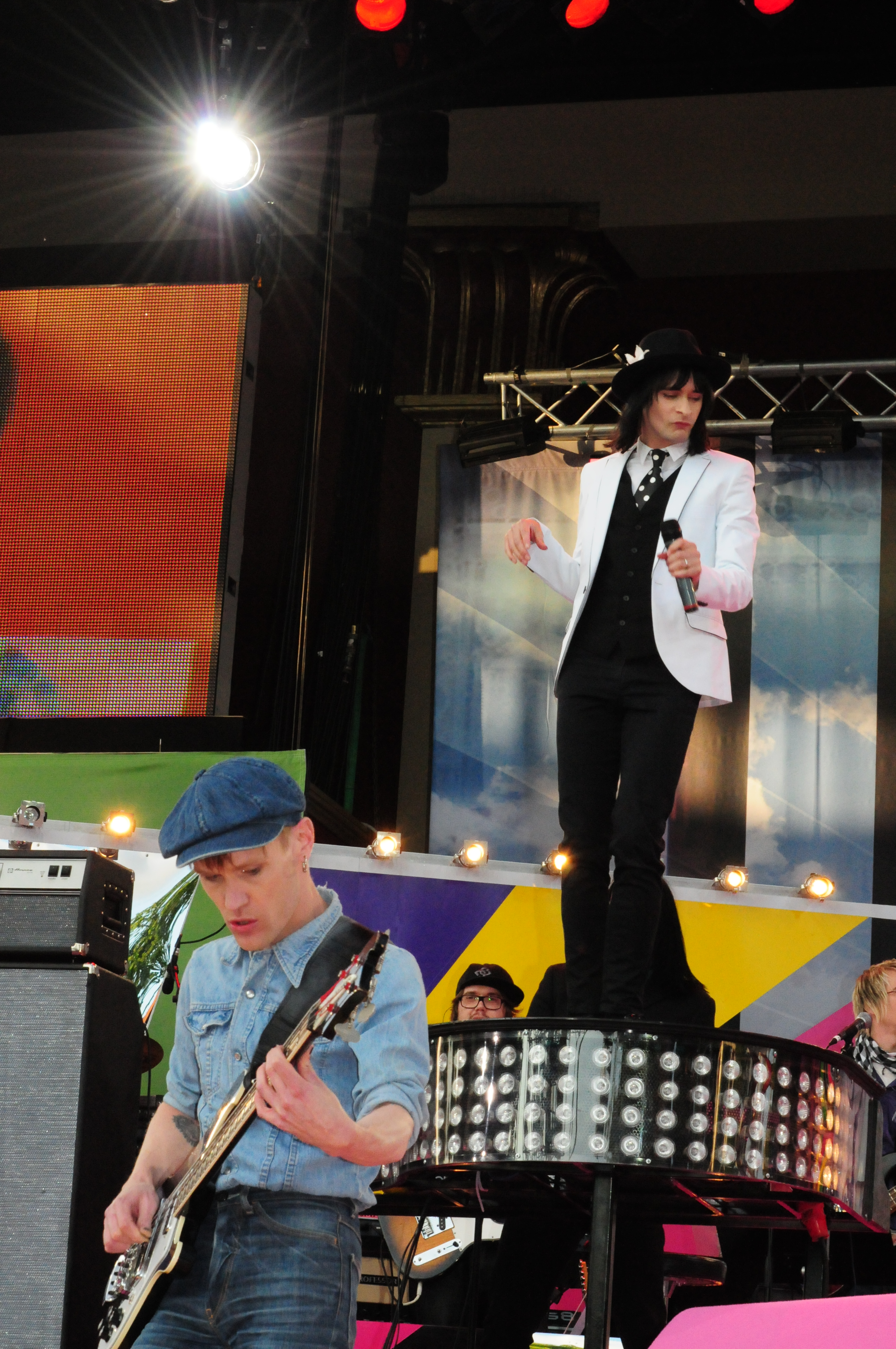

Background information
- Origin: Sweden
- Genres: New wave, nu-disco, synthpop, glam rock, synthrock
- Years active: 2000–2013, 2025–-present
- Members: Kristofer Östergren; Erik Stenemo; Jon Bordon; Richard Ankers
- Past members: Magnus Roos; Andy A Nicklas Stenemo
- Website: melodyclub.com

Melody Club is a Swedish band from Växjö formed in January 2000. Their breakthrough came in 2002 with the song Palace Station, which was also a big success in Germany. Additionally, the song was featured in the soundtrack of the film Slim Susie. The band has frequent radio airplay in Sweden, Germany, Japan, Norway and Denmark.

Melody Club's style can be described as a blend of synthpop and glam rock. The single "Fever Fever" is included on the soundtrack of the football video game by EA Sports, FIFA 08. On 22 April 2009, they released their fifth and first self-produced album, "Goodbye to Romance". The first single from the album was called "Girls Don't Always Wanna Have Fun"—a possible reference to Cyndi Lauper's "Girls Just Wanna Have Fun".

In 2010 Andy A left the group in protest against the group's participation in Eurovision and was replaced with the original drummer Richard Ankers.

In the summer of 2025, they reunited the band with a tour.

The former bass player Nicklas Stenemo is now the vocalist in the Malmö band Kite.

== Melodifestivalen 2011 ==
Melody Club participated in Melodifestivalen 2011, the Swedish selection for the Eurovision Song Contest 2011. They competed in the fourth semi-final on 26 February 2011 in Malmö Arena, Malmö with the song "The Hunter", finishing in 7th place.

== Band members ==
- Kristofer Östergren - vocals
- Erik Stenemo - guitar
- Jon Bordon - synthesizer
- Richard Ankers - drums

== Discography ==
=== Albums ===
Year	Album	Peak chart position		Certifications
Year	Album	NOR	SWE	Certifications
2002	Music Machine	17	1	GLF: Gold
2004	Face the Music	—	6	GLF: Gold
2006	Scream	—	18	
2009	Goodbye to Romance	—	18	
2011	Human Harbour	—	22	

Compilation albums

Year	Album	Peak chart position	
Year	Album	NOR	SWE
2007	At Your Service	—	—
2012	Let's Celebrate 2002–2012	—	24

=== Singles ===
Title	Year	Chart position	Album
Title	Year	SWE	Album
"Palace Station"	2002	9	Music Machine
"Electric"	2002	18	Music Machine
"Covergirl"	2003	37	Music Machine
"Take Me Away"	2004	16	Face the Music
"Baby (Stand Up)"	2004	2	Face the Music
"Boys in the Girls' Room"	2005	25	Face the Music
"Wildhearts"	2005	—	Face the Music
"Destiny Calling"	2006	15	Scream
"Fever Fever"	2007	32	Scream
"Last Girl on My Mind"	2007	27	Scream
"Girls Don't Always Wanna Have Fun"	2009	60	Goodbye to Romance
"The Only Ones"	2009	48	Goodbye to Romance
"I Don't Believe in Angels" (featuring Anna Järvinen)	2009	31	Non-album single
"The Hunter"	2011	—	Human Harbour
"Paralyzed"	2012	—	Human Harbour
