= Mark Levengood =

Finnish journalist, writer, and television host

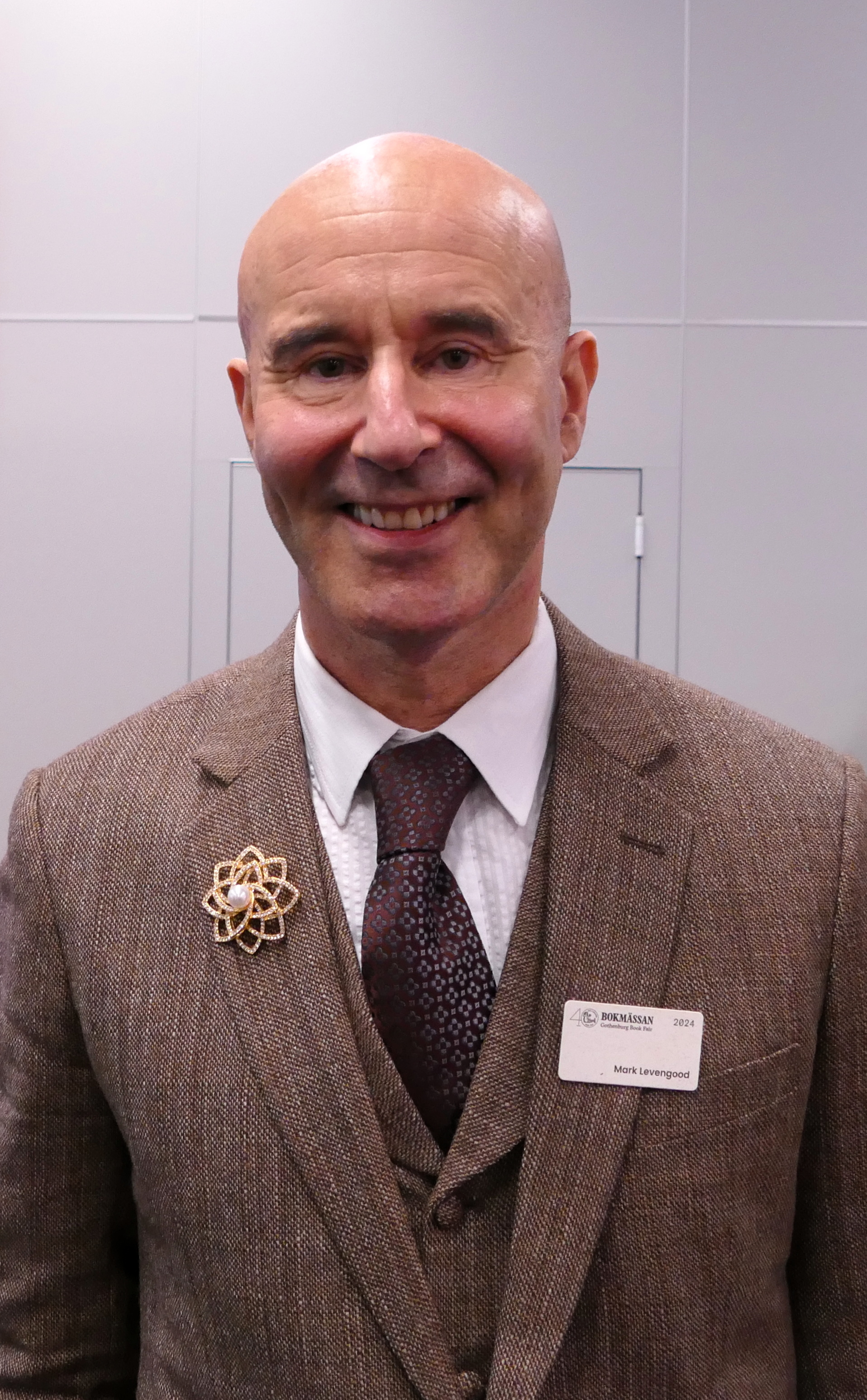
Mark Levengood in 2024

Mark Levengood (born 10 July 1964 in Lejeune Base Camp, North Carolina, in the United States) is a Finnish journalist, writer, and television host who works in Sweden. He is a Swedish-speaking Finn who grew up in Helsinki. He was married to Jonas Gardell between 2011 and 2023. They have one child each, a boy, who is Gardell's biological child, and a girl, who is Levengood's child. Levengood was born to an American father and a Finland-Swedish mother.

On April 1, 2008, Levengood was named UNICEF ambassador. He is a member of the board of the University of Gotland. Until 2018, Levengood has been a summer host this summer in P1 six times: June 27, 1993, June 22, 1996, July 4, 1999, June 24, 2007, June 25, 2011, and 28, 2018. Levengood was Vegas Summer Tapers in 2014. Levengood belongs to the Roman Catholic Church.

Amongst other shows, he has hosted Melodifestivalen.
