= Josefin Nilsson =

Musical artist

- Born: Monica Emma Josefin Nilsson; 22 March 1969; När, Gotland, Sweden
- Origin: Gotland
- Died: 29 February 2016 (aged 46) Själsö, Gotland, Sweden
- Occupations: Singer-songwriter, actress
- Formerly of: Ainbusk
- Website: www.josefinnilsson.com

Monica Emma Josefin Nilsson, registered as Monica Emma Josefina Nilsson (22 March 1969 – 29 February 2016) was a Swedish singer and actress.

== Biography ==
Born in När, Gotland, Josefin Nilsson was the daughter of revue artist and songwriter Allan Nilsson. She founded the Ainbusk group with her sister Marie Nilsson (1961-2024) and two friends Annelie Roswall and Birgitta "Bittis" Jakobsson. They were noticed by Benny Andersson who wrote them two songs that were successful in Sweden. They released their first EP in 1990.

In 1992, she received the Ulla Billquist scholarship, an award that encourages young artists. The following year, her first solo album, Shapes was written and produced by Björn Ulvaeus and Benny Andersson of the ABBA group and ranked 14th in Swedish sales. She played the role of Svetlana in the Swedish version of Chess in 2002 and participated in the Melodifestivalen (Swedish national selections for the Eurovision Song Contest) solo in 2005 and with her group Ainbusk in 2008. She released several albums with her band from 1993 to 2008 and was noticed in a few movies but had to take a break due to health problems.

An Estonian-language cover version of Josefin Nilsson's "Surprise, Surprise" was made in 1995. It was named "Sa muutsid kõik" and performed by Estonian pop singer Nancy.

In 2015, Benny Andersson wrote a new track that she recorded with Marie Nilsson but it was not released in digital version until four years later. In 2016, she gave a few concerts in Gotland with her sister Marie. Shortly after undergoing hip surgery, Josefin died in her home in Gotland, on 29 February 2016, at age 46. In 2019, a documentary on the singer's life was broadcast on SVT and revealed the violence she had suffered from her former partner, who was not mentioned by name but soon revealed to be Örjan Ramberg, the latter being the main cause of her state of health. The documentary revived the debate on domestic violence in Sweden.

== Discography ==
=== Albums ===
- Shapes (1993) #14 SWE

=== Singles ===
- "Heaven and Hell" (1993) #28 SWE
- "High Hopes and Heartaches"
- "Where the Whales Have Ceased to Sing"
- "Surprise, Surprise"
- "Med hjärtats egna ord" (2005)
- "Jag saknar dig ibland" (2008)

== Filmography ==
Year	Title	Role
1996	Juloratoriet	
1997	Adam & Eva	Eva
2000	Det blir aldrig som man tänkt sig	Sophia
2002	Chess	Svetlana Sergievsky
