= Las Vegas (Martin Stenmarck song) =

2005 song by Martin Stenmarck

Single by Martin Stenmarck
- Released: 2005
- Songwriters: Tim Larsson; Tobias Lundgren; Johan Fransson; Niklas Edberger

Eurovision Song Contest 2005 entry
- Country: Sweden
- Artist: Martin Stenmarck
- Language: English
- Composers: Tim Larsson; Tobias Lundgren; Johan Fransson; Niklas Edberger
- Lyricists: Tim Larsson; Tobias Lundgren; Johan Fransson; Niklas Edberger

Finals performance
- Final result: 19th
- Final points: 30

Entry chronology
- ◄ "It Hurts" (2004)
- "Invincible" (2006) ►

"Las Vegas" is a 2005 song written by Tim Larsson, Tobias Lundgren, Johan Fransson, and Niklas Edberger and performed by Martin Stenmarck. It was the winning song at Melodifestivalen 2005 and represented Sweden at the Eurovision Song Contest 2005, where it finished 19th of the 24 competing songs in the final.

== Melodifestivalen and the Eurovision Song Contest ==
"Las Vegas" participated in the third heat of the 2005 Melodifestivalen which was held on 26 February 2005 at the Isstadion indoor arena in Skellefteå. The song was the last of the eight competing entries to perform and directly qualified to the contest final as one of the two songs which received the most telephone votes. On 12 March, during the final held at the Globe Arena in Stockholm, Stenmarck was the first of the ten competing acts to perform, and "Las Vegas" won the contest with 212 points, receiving the highest number of votes from the regional juries and the second highest number of public votes.

Sweden automatically qualified to the final of the 2005 Eurovision Song Contest in Kyiv, Ukraine courtesy of its 5th place finish at the previous year's contest. "Las Vegas" was performed in the final on 21 May 2005, with Sweden drawn to perform in fourteenth position of the 24 competing entries. Stenmark subsequently finished in nineteenth place, receiving 30 points in total.

== Charts ==
=== Weekly charts ===
Chart (2005)	Peak position
Sweden (Sverigetopplistan)	1

=== Year-end charts ===
Chart (2005)	Position
Sweden (Sverigetopplistan)	18

Preceded by "Det gör ont" by Lena Philipsson	Melodifestivalen winners 2005	Succeeded by "Evighet" by Carola Häggkvist
