= Martin Stenmarck =

Swedish singer and voice actor

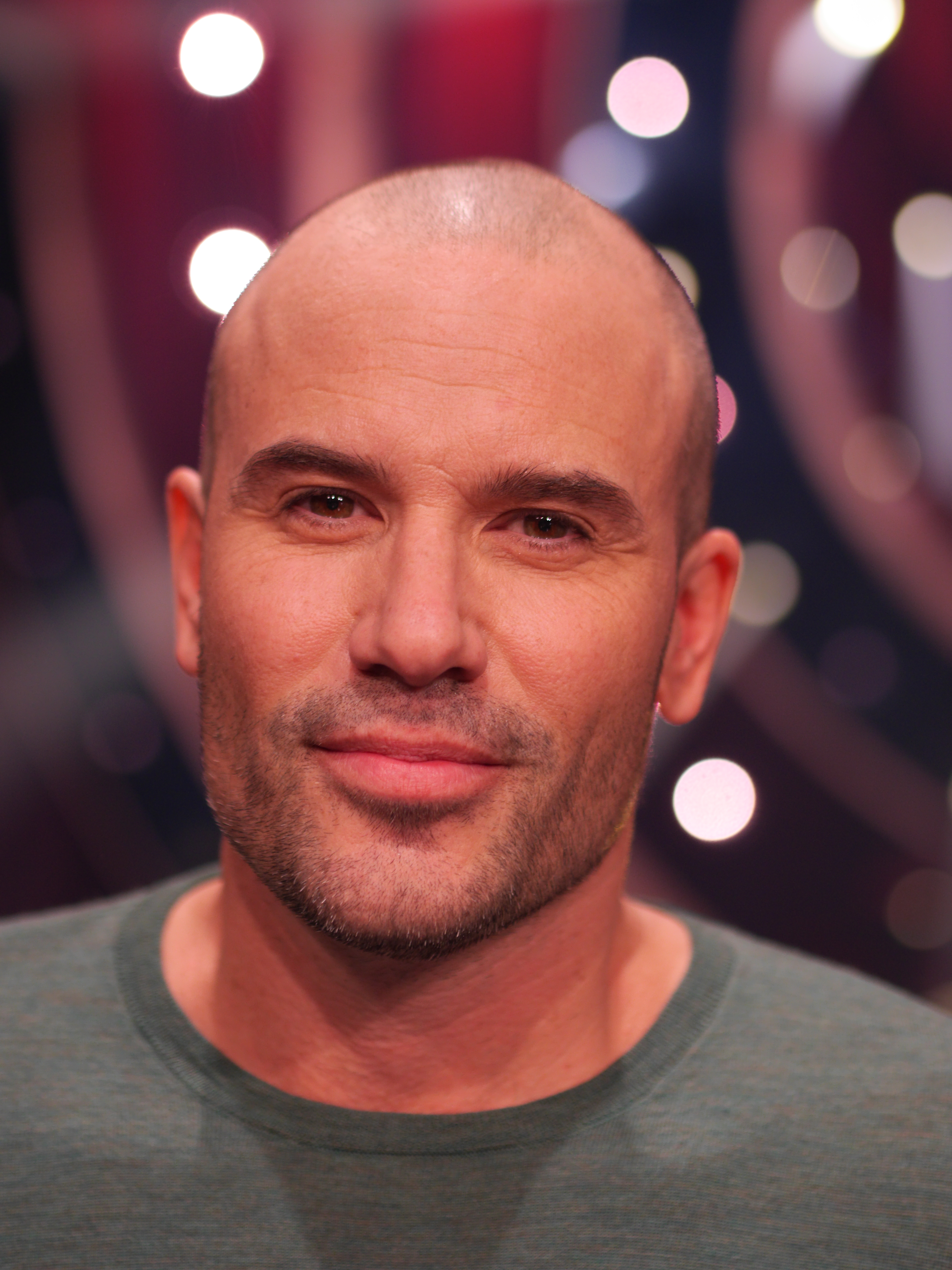
- Stenmarck at Melodifestivalen 2019

Background information
- Born: Martin Olof Jon Stenmarck; 3 October 1972 (age 53); Täby, Sweden
- Origin: Örebro, Sweden
- Genres: Pop music
- Occupations: Singer, musician, voice actor
- Instruments: Vocals, guitar
- Years active: 1997–present
- Website: martinstenmarck.com

Martin Olof Jon Stenmarck (born 3 October 1972) is a Swedish singer, musician, and voice actor. He represented Sweden in the Eurovision Song Contest 2005 with the song "Las Vegas", finishing 19th with 30 points.

== Career ==
In 2006, Stenmarck released his first single in Swedish, "Sjumilakliv", which became one of the year's biggest hits in Sweden. The single was certified Platinum and spent 10 weeks at No. 1 (three weeks in 2006 and seven weeks in 2007) on the official Swedish singles chart.

The album Nio sanningar och en lögn (Nine truths and one lie) topped the Swedish albums chart and achieved gold status in the first of its three weeks at number 1.

Stenmarck has also embarked on a voice acting career, dubbing animated films. He provided the Swedish voice for Lightning McQueen in the Disney movie Cars. Since 2011, he is the host of the TV show Kvällen är din.

He participated in Melodifestivalen 2019 with the song "Låt skiten brinna".

== Discography ==
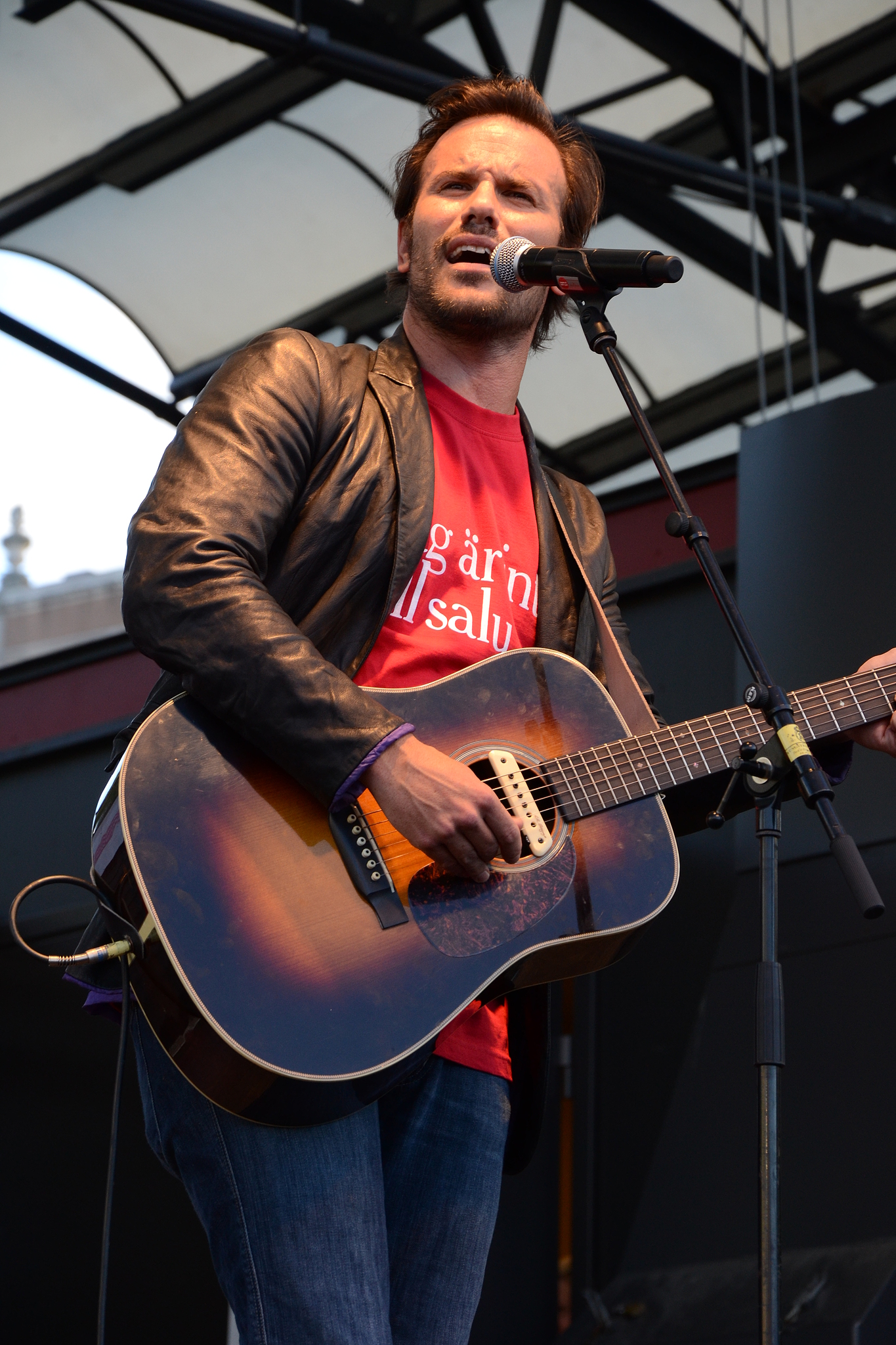
Stenmarck performing in 2011

=== Albums ===
- 2002: One
- 2003: One (international version with I'm Falling added)
- 2004: Think of Me (#25)
- 2005: Think of Me (with Las Vegas added) (#9)
- 2006: 9 sanningar och en lögn (#1)
- 2007: 9 sanningar och en lögn (with three remixes added)
- 2007: Det är det pojkar gör när kärleken dör (#4)
- 2009: Septemberland (#10)
- 2010: Kaffe på Everest
- 2015: Härifrån ser jag allt!

=== EPs ===
- 2005: Upp och ner sånger

=== Singles ===
- 1990: "En bomb" / "Breakdown"
- 2002: "The Cure for You" (#38)
- 2002: "Losing Game"
- 2003: "I'm Falling"
- 2004: "I ljus och mörker" (duet with Viktoria Krantz)
- 2004: "That's When I Love You"
- 2004: "I Believe"
- 2005: "Las Vegas" (#1)
- 2006: "Sjumilakliv" (#1)
- 2007: "Nästa dans" (#32)
- 2007: "Ta undulaten"
- 2007: "100 år från nu (blundar)" (#1)
- 2008: "Rubb och stubb" (#26)
- 2008: "A Million Candles Burning" (#1)
- 2009: "1000 nålar" (#1)
- 2010: "Andas"
- 2010: "Everybody's Changing" (#27)
- 2011: "Tonight's the Night"
- 2014: "När änglarna går hem" (#41)
- 2016: "Du tar mig tillbaks" (#90)
- 2016: "Den svenska sommaren"
- 2018: "Låt mig brinna"

Title	Year	Peak chart positions	Album
Title	Year	SWE	Album
"Låt skiten brinna"	2019	53	Non-album single

=== Other appearances ===
- 1997: West Side Story (sings "Vem vet?", "Maria" and "Bara du (i natt)")
- 2001: Rhapsody in Rock Completely Live (sings "You're the Voice")
- 2003: Rhapsody in Rock The Complete Collection (sings "Dance with the Devil")
- 2004: Arn de Gothia (TV soundtrack)
- 2005: Svenska musikalfavoriter (sings "Maria" from West Side Story)

Preceded by Lena Philipsson	Sweden in the Eurovision Song Contest; 2005	Succeeded by Carola
