= Andorra in the Eurovision Song Contest 2007 =

- Eurovision Song Contest 2007
- Participating broadcaster: Ràdio i Televisió d'Andorra (RTVA)
- Country: Andorra
- Selection process: Internal selection
- Announcement date: Artist: 15 January 2007; Song: 1 March 2007

Competing entry
- Song: "Salvem el món"
- Artist: Anonymous
- Songwriters: Guillem Gallego; Niki Francesca; Alejandro Martínez

Placement
- Semi-final result: Failed to qualify (12th)

Participation chronology

Andorra was represented at the Eurovision Song Contest 2007 with the song "Salvem el món" written and performed by young Andorran punk-rock band Anonymous, consisting of band members: Guillem Gallego, Niki Francesca, and Alejandro Martínez. The Andorran participating broadcaster, Ràdio i Televisió d'Andorra (RTVA), internally selected its entry for the contest in a process called Projecte Eurovisió. The internal selection ended with a total of 82 songs having been submitted to RTVA. These entries were whittled down by the broadcaster to determine the fourth Andorran representatives. Anonymous were announced on 15 January 2007, while the song was presented in a special gala show on 1 March 2007.

As Andorra failed to qualify for the 2006 final, the country was forced to compete in the semi-final of the Eurovision Song Contest which took place on 10 May 2007. Performing during the show in position 21, "Salvem el món" was not announced among the 10 qualifying entries of the semi-final, despite being predicted to qualify with the bookmakers and being a consistent fan favourite. They therefore did not qualify to compete in the final. It was later revealed that Andorra placed twelfth out of the 28 participating countries in the semi-final with 80 points, just 11 points away from qualifying. This remains Andorra's best result to date.

== Background ==
Prior to the 2007 contest, Ràdio i Televisió d'Andorra (RTVA) had participated in the Eurovision Song Contest representing Andorra three times since its first entry in 2004. To this point, the nation has yet to feature in a final, with their best result being in 2004 with the song "Jugarem a estimar-nos" performed by Marta Roure which placed eighteenth out of the 22 participating entries in the semi-final, while their worst result was achieved in 2006 where they placed twenty-third (last) out of the 23 entries in the semi-final with the song "Sense tu" by Jenny.

As part of its duties as participating broadcaster, RTVA organises the selection of its entry in the Eurovision Song Contest and broadcasts the event in the country. The broadcaster confirmed its intentions to participate at the 2007 contest on 10 July 2006. In 2004 and 2005, RTVA had set up a national final in order to select its entry for the contest, while the broadcaster opted for an internal selection in 2006 to select both the artist and song. The internal selection method was continued for its 2007 entry.

== Before Eurovision ==
=== Projecte Eurovisió ===
RTVA selected its entry for the Eurovision Song Contest 2007 through a selection process entitled Projecte Eurovisió. A submission period was open for artists and composers to separately submit their applications and entries between 15 September 2006 and 15 December 2006. Artists were required be aged at least 18 and have Andorran citizenship or residency, while those with musical experience and fluency in Catalan, English, and French were given priority. Songwriters could be of any nationality and submit songs in any language, but songs in Catalan were given priority. 82 song submissions and 27 artist applications were received at the conclusion of the submission period.

On 15 January 2007, RTVA held a press conference where they announced that the band Anonymous had been selected based on the decision of a ten-member professional jury to represent Andorra in Helsinki with the song "Salvem el món", which was written by band members Guillem Gallego, Niki Francesca and Alejandro Martínez. The members of the jury panel were Gualbert Osorio (general director of RTVA), Pati Molné (Head of ATV programmes), Creu Rosell (Head of the Andorran Delegation at Eurovision Song Contest), Josep Lluís Trabal (project manager for RTVA), Meri Picart (music director of RTVA), Jordi Botey (singer), Jordi González de Alaiza (director of culture of Sant Julià de Lòria), Ferran Costa (director of Inlingua Andorra), Jesús Prieto (representative of OGAE Andorra) and Joan Antón Rechi (stage director). The song was presented to the public on 1 March 2007 during a special gala show entitled Som Anonymous, which took place at the Auditori Claror del Centre Cultural i de Congressos Lauredià in Sant Julià de Lòria, hosted by Meri Picart and broadcast on ATV as well as online via the broadcaster's website atv.ad. In addition to the presentation of the song, the gala show featured guest performances by the band Gossos and singers Joan Tena, Josep Thió, Lluís Cartes, Manuel Carrasco, and Víctor.

=== Promotion ===
Anonymous specifically promoted "Salvem el món" as the Andorran Eurovision entry by taking part in promotional activities in Barcelona, Spain, which included a performance during the Emergenza Music Festival which was held at the Sala Mephisto venue on 24 March and a concert performance at the Sala Apolo venue on 1 April.

== At Eurovision ==
According to the then Eurovision rules, all nations with the exceptions of the host country, the "Big 4" (France, Germany, Spain, and the United Kingdom) and the ten highest placed finishers in the 2004 contest were required to qualify from the semi-final in order to compete for the final; the top ten countries from the semi-final progress to the final. As Andorra did not make the top 10 of the previous contest or was a member of the "Big 4", Anonymous were forced to compete in the semi-final. For 2007, a new feature allowed five wild-card countries from the semi-final to choose their starting position. The heads of delegation went on stage and chose the number they would take. In the semi-final, Austria, Andorra, Turkey, Slovenia and Latvia were able to choose their positions. It was later revealed that the Andorran delegation had chosen to perform in position 21, following the entry from Malta and before the entry from Hungary.

The semi-final and the final were broadcast in Andorra on ATV with commentary by Meri Picart and Josep Lluís Trabal. RTVA appointed Marian van de Wal (who represented Andorra in 2005) as its spokesperson to announce the Andorran votes during the final.

=== Semi-final ===
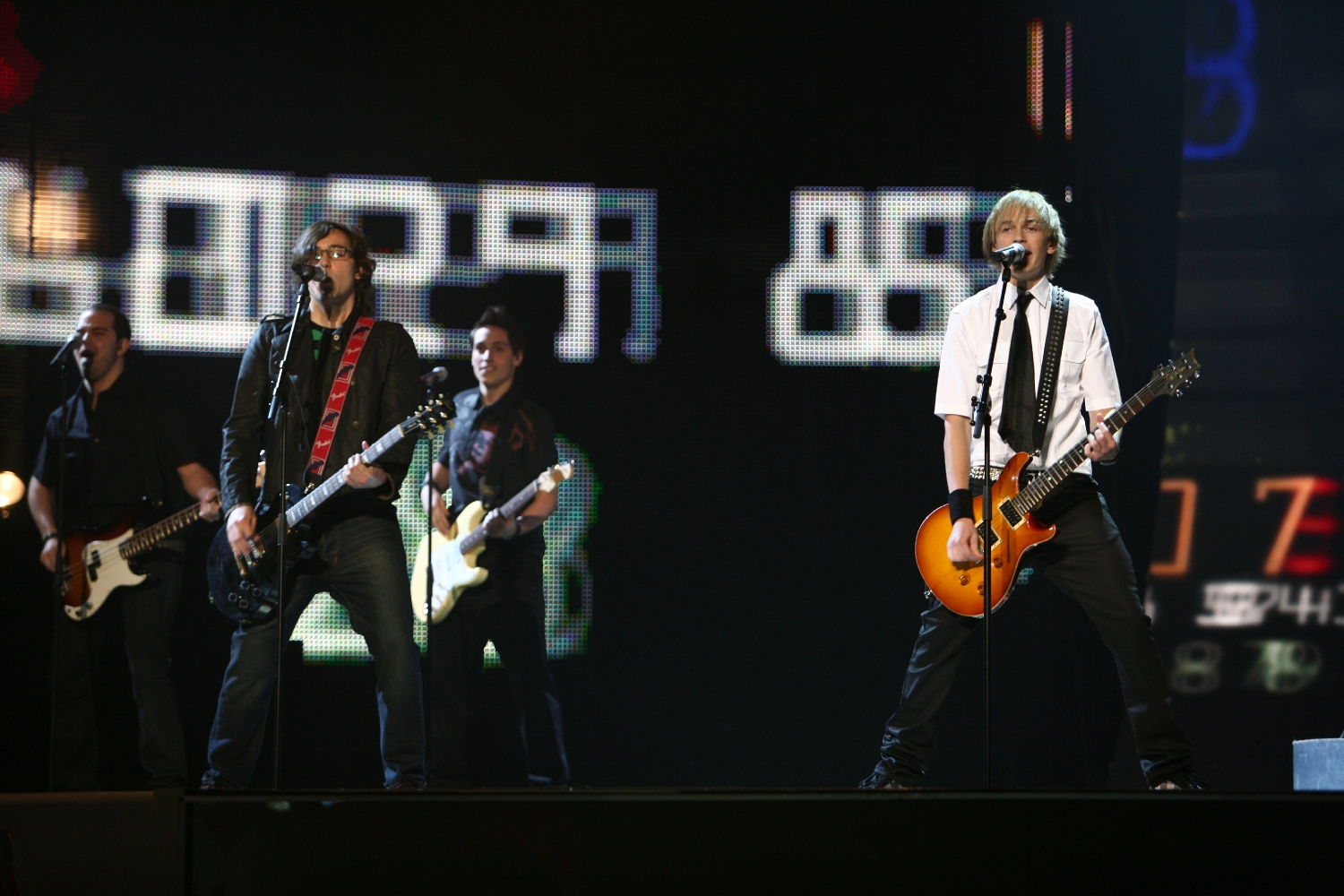
Anonymous performing their song at the semi-final of the Eurovision Song Contest 2007.

At Eurovision, Anonymous wore simple clothing styled in a typically punk rock theme. The staging included fast-paced flashing numbers and interactive translations of the song in English. The performance was likened to that of Green Day and Blink-182.

At the end of the show, Andorra was not announced among the top 10 entries in the semi-final and therefore failed to qualify to compete in the final. It was later revealed that Andorra placed twelfth in the semi-final, receiving a total of 80 points (just 11 points away from qualifying for the final). Anonymous remain a Eurovision fan favourite and the only ever male representatives for Andorra.

=== Voting ===
In 2005 the EBU introduced an undisclosed threshold number of televotes that would have to be registered in each voting country in order to make that country's votes valid. If that number was not reached, the country's backup jury would vote instead. In both the semi-final and final of the contest, this affected two countries: one of them being Andorra. Therefore, the country had to use a backup jury panel to calculate the Andorran results. This jury judged each entry based on: vocal capacity; the stage performance; the song's composition and originality; and the overall impression of the act. In addition, no member of a national jury was permitted to be related in any way to any of the competing acts in such a way that they cannot vote impartially and independently.

Below is a breakdown of points awarded to Andorra and awarded by Andorra in the semi-final and grand final of the contest. The nation awarded its 12 points to Portugal in the semi-final and Ukraine in the final of the contest. Andorra also notably gave 10 points to Poland in the semi-final of the contest and 10 points to Romania in the final. 2007 also marked the only year throughout Andorra's participation span between 2004 and 2009 that no points were awarded from Andorra to Spain.

==== Points awarded to Andorra ====
Points awarded to Andorra (Semi-final)
Score	Country
12 points	Spain
10 points	
8 points	
7 points	Czech Republic
6 points	Iceland; Poland; Portugal
5 points	Estonia; Finland
4 points	Belarus; Greece; Ireland; Russia; Slovenia
3 points	
2 points	Croatia; Israel; Lithuania; Norway; Sweden; Turkey
1 point	Macedonia

==== Points awarded by Andorra ====
Points awarded by Andorra (Semi-final)
Score	Country
12 points	Portugal
10 points	Poland
8 points	Slovenia
7 points	Turkey
6 points	Switzerland
5 points	Netherlands
4 points	Hungary
3 points	Norway
2 points	Denmark
1 point	Austria

Points awarded by Andorra (Final)
Score	Country
12 points	Ukraine
10 points	Romania
8 points	France
7 points	Finland
6 points	Hungary
5 points	Germany
4 points	Moldova
3 points	Russia
2 points	Sweden
1 point	Lithuania
