= Andorra in the Eurovision Song Contest 2005 =

- Eurovision Song Contest 2005
- Participating broadcaster: Ràdio i Televisió d'Andorra (RTVA)
- Country: Andorra
- Selection process: Desitja'm sort
- Selection date: Artist: 19 December 2004; Song: 22 January 2005

Competing entry
- Song: "La mirada interior"
- Artist: Marian van de Wal
- Songwriters: Rafael Artesero; Daniel Aragay; Rafa Fernández

Placement
- Semi-final result: Failed to qualify (23rd)

Participation chronology

Andorra was represented at the Eurovision Song Contest 2005 with the song "La mirada interior", written by Rafael Artesero, Daniel Aragay, and Rafa Fernández, and performed by Marian van de Wal. The Andorran participating broadcaster, Ràdio i Televisió d'Andorra (RTVA), organised the national final Desitja'm sort in order to select its entry for the contest. The national final took place over three stages and two televised shows, resulting in the selection of Marian van de Wal as the winning artist on 19 December 2004 and "La mirada interior" as the winning song on 22 January 2005.

Andorra competed in the semi-final of the Eurovision Song Contest which took place on 19 May 2005. Performing during the show in position 18, "La mirada interior" was not announced among the top 10 entries of the semi-final and therefore did not qualify to compete in the final. It was later revealed that Andorra placed twenty-third out of the 25 participating countries in the semi-final with 27 points.

== Background ==
Prior to the 2005 contest, Ràdio i Televisió d'Andorra (RTVA) had participated in the Eurovision Song Contest representing Andorra only once, in 2004 with the song "Jugarem a estimar-nos" performed by Marta Roure, which failed to qualify to the final where they placed eighteenth out of the 22 participating entries in the semi-final.

As part of its duties as participating broadcaster, RTVA organises the selection of its entry in the Eurovision Song Contest and broadcasts the event in the country. The broadcaster confirmed its intentions to participate at the 2005 contest on 3 September 2004. In 2004, RTVA had set up the national final 12 Punts in collaboration with Catalan broadcaster Televisió de Catalunya (TVC). The national final procedure was continued for its 2005 entry but without the collaboration with TVC.

== Before Eurovision ==
=== Desitja'm sort ===
Desitja'm sort (Wish me luck) was the national final organised by RTVA to select its entry for the Eurovision Song Contest 2005. The competition consisted of two shows held on 19 December 2004 and 22 January 2005, respectively. Both shows were hosted by Meri Picart and Josep Lluís Trabal and broadcast on ATV and in Catalonia via radio on Catalunya Cultura.

==== Format ====
The selection of the Andorran Eurovision entry took place over three stages. The first stage, entitled Eurocàsting, took place between 24 October and 10 December 2004 and involved 32 candidates. Three artists were ultimately selected to proceed to the second stage of the competition. The second stage was the artist selection which took place during the first televised show of Desitja'm sort on 19 December 2004. The winning artist proceeded to the third stage, the song selection, which took place during the second televised show of Desitja'm sort on 22 January 2005 and featured three candidate Eurovision songs all performed by the artist. The results of all stages were determined by a combination of votes from a professional jury and a public televote via SMS. The jury for the artist and song selection shows consisted of five and seven members, respectively. Each juror had an equal stake in the final result, while the results of the public televote had a weighting equal to the votes of two jurors. In the event of a tie, the tie was resolved by the youngest juror.

==== Eurocàsting ====
Auditions for Eurocàsting took place between 24 and 26 October 2004 at the Andorra la Vella Fair. Applicants were required to have Andorran citizenship or residency as of 2000 and fluency in Catalan. The 32 candidates that attended the auditions were presented to the public via postcard specials broadcast during the ATV programme Diagonal between 2 and 23 November 2004. The combination of votes from a five-member professional jury and a public televote that registered 5,000 votes determined the top 16 candidates to qualify for the next stage, which were announced on 25 November 2004 during Diagonal. The 16 candidates were further presented on Diagonal until 8 December 2004 and the combination of the jury and public vote that registered 7,500 votes determined the three artists for Desitja'm sort, which were announced on 10 December 2004 during Diagonal.

Eurocàsting – 10 December 2004
- Anna Madeira
- Bàrbara Escudero
- Francesc Leiva
- Francesca Gutiérrez
- Ishtar Ruiz
- Juanjo García
- Julià Alaez
- Julio Barrero
- Laura Rodríguez
- Letícia Sánchez
- Mar Capdevila
- Maria del Carme Puig
- Marian van de Wal
- Marta Dallerés
- Marta Mas
- Susanna Gómez

==== Artist selection ====
The artist selection show of Desitja'm sort took place on 19 December 2004 at the Centre de Congressos in Andorra la Vella where each of the three finalists performed two songs in Catalan, one being a ballad and the other being uptempo. The running order was determined through a draw and announced on 13 December 2004. Marian van de Wal and Mar Capdevila were tied at three points each following the combination of votes from a five-member professional jury (5/7) and a public televote (2/7), but since the youngest juror voted for van de Wal she was declared the winner. In addition to the performances, the show featured an interval act from singer Joan Tena.

Artist selection – 19 December 2004
R/O	Artist	Song 1 (Original artists)	Song 2 (Original artists)	Jury	Televote		Total	Place
R/O	Artist	Song 1 (Original artists)	Song 2 (Original artists)	Jury	Votes	Points	Total	Place
1	Ishtar Ruiz	"Sóc jo" (Marta Sánchez)	"Boig per tu" (Sau)	1	318	0	1	3
2	Marian van de Wal	"Quina sort" (Shakira)	"Quan sommiis fes-ho amb mi" (Nina)	3	372	0	3	1
3	Mar Capdevila	"Tot queda enrera" (The Eagles)	"Pensa en mi" (Luz Casal)	1	377	2	3	2

==== Song selection ====
The song selection show of Desitja'm sort took place on 22 January 2005 at the Auditori Claror del Centre Cultural i de Congressos Lauredià in Sant Julià de Lòria where Marian van de Wal performed three candidate Eurovision songs selected from over 70 received submissions. The combination of votes from a seven-member professional jury (7/9) and a public televote (2/9) selected "La mirada interior" as the winning song. The members of the jury panel were Josep Maria Ubach (director of culture of the Government of Andorra), Roser Palomero (director of Escola Harmonia), Catheryne Metayer (director of the Petits Cantors del Principat d'Andorra), Enric Frigola (director of Catalunya Ràdio), Marc Parrot (musician and producer), David Micó (musician) and Josep Agell (representative of RTVA). In addition to the performances, the show featured an interval act from Ruslana who won Eurovision for Ukraine in 2004.

Song selection – 22 January 2005
R/O	Song	Songwriter(s)	Jury	Televote	Total	Place
1	"No demanis"	Daniel Ambrojo	0	0	0	3
2	"Dóna'm la pau"	Gisela Asensio, Sergi Fecé, Toni Nojas, Jordi Tejenaute	2	0	2	2
3	"La mirada interior"	Rafa Tanit, Daniel Aragay, Rafa Fernández	5	2	7	1

=== Preparation and promotion ===
Following the Andorran national final, Marian van de Wal filmed the music video for "La mirada interior" during early March 2005 in Andorra la Vella, Canillo and Engolasters. The video together with a revamped version of the song was presented on 21 March 2005 during the ATV programme +MU.SI.K, hosted by Meri Picart. Marian van de Wal specifically promoted "La mirada interior" as the Andorran Eurovision entry on 2 March 2005 by performing the song during the Greek Eurovision national final Eurovision Party.

== At Eurovision ==
According to Eurovision rules, all nations with the exceptions of the host country, the "Big Four" (France, Germany, Spain, and the United Kingdom) and the ten highest placed finishers in the 2004 contest are required to qualify from the semi-final on 19 May 2005 in order to compete for the final on 21 May 2005; the top ten countries from the semi-final progress to the final. On 22 March 2005, a special allocation draw was held which determined the running order for the semi-final and Andorra was set to perform in position 18, following the entry from Macedonia and before the entry from Switzerland.

The semi-final and the final were broadcast in Andorra on ATV with commentary by Meri Picart and Josep Lluís Trabal. RTVA appointed Ruth Gumbau as its spokesperson to announce the Andorran votes during the final.

=== Semi-final ===
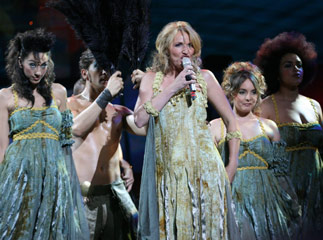
Marian van de Wal during a rehearsal before the semi-final

Marian van de Wal took part in technical rehearsals on 13 and 15 May, followed by dress rehearsals on 18 and 19 May. The Andorran performance featured Marian van de Wal wearing an 18th-century-style green dress, joined on stage by three backing vocalists wearing green dresses and two shirtless dancers wearing black pants. Van de Wal and the backing vocalists performed simple choreography while the dancers moved around the stage in a more complex way while holding black feathers. The two dancers that joined Marian van de Wal were Jose Ortiz and Oscar Soto, while the three backing vocalists were Anabel Conde, Rebeka Brown and Yolanda Cikara. Conde had represented Spain in 1995.

At the end of the show, Andorra was not announced among the top 10 entries in the semi-final and therefore failed to qualify to compete in the final. It was later revealed that Andorra placed twenty-third in the semi-final, receiving a total of 27 points.

=== Voting ===
Between 1998 and 2008, the voting was calculated by 100% televoting from viewers across Europe. However, in 2005 the EBU introduced an undisclosed threshold number of televotes that would have to be registered in each voting country in order to make that country's votes valid. If that number was not reached, the country's backup jury would vote instead. In both the semi-final and final of the contest, this affected several countries including Andorra. Therefore, the country had to use a backup jury panel to calculate the Andorran results. This jury judged each entry based on: vocal capacity; the stage performance; the song's composition and originality; and the overall impression of the act. In addition, no member of a national jury was permitted to be related in any way to any of the competing acts in such a way that they cannot vote impartially and independently.

Below is a breakdown of points awarded to Andorra and awarded by Andorra in the semi-final and grand final of the contest. The nation awarded its 12 points to Israel in the semi-final and to Spain in the final of the contest. Andorra also notably awarded 10 points to fellow microstate Monaco in the semi-final of the contest.

==== Points awarded to Andorra ====
Points awarded to Andorra (Semi-final)
Score	Country
12 points	
10 points	Spain
8 points	
7 points	Netherlands
6 points	Albania
5 points	
4 points	Moldova
3 points	
2 points	
1 point	

==== Points awarded by Andorra ====
Points awarded by Andorra (Semi-final)
Score	Country
12 points	Israel
10 points	Monaco
8 points	Denmark
7 points	Austria
6 points	Iceland
5 points	Netherlands
4 points	Romania
3 points	Finland
2 points	Ireland
1 point	Hungary

Points awarded by Andorra (Final)
Score	Country
12 points	Spain
10 points	Latvia
8 points	Israel
7 points	Romania
6 points	Hungary
5 points	France
4 points	Greece
3 points	Denmark
2 points	Norway
1 point	Switzerland
