= Andorra in the Eurovision Song Contest =

- Eurovision Song Contest
- Participating broadcaster: Ràdio i Televisió d'Andorra (RTVA)

Participation summary
- Appearances: 6 (0 finals)
- First appearance: 2004
- Last appearance: 2009
- Highest placement: 12th semi-final: 2007
- Participation history: 2004; 2005; 2006; 2007; 2008; 2009; 2010 – 2026
- Andorra's page at Eurovision.com
- For the most recent participation see Andorra in the Eurovision Song Contest 2009

Andorra has been represented at the Eurovision Song Contest six times, debuting in the 2004 contest and participating every year thereafter until the 2009 contest. The Andorran participating broadcaster in the contest is Ràdio i Televisió d'Andorra (RTVA). To date, Andorra remains the only nation to have never competed in a final, with its best result being a 12th-place finish in the 2007 contest's semi-final. Andorra withdrew from the contest following its 2009 appearance, with RTVA citing financial difficulties as the reason for its withdrawal. The country has not entered the contest again since. Interest in the contest has, however, remained high in the country, while statements from the Andorran government and broadcaster indicated that a future return was possible, depending on financial backing.

RTVA used a mixture of methods to select its entrants in the years it competed, employing a national final for 2004, 2005, and 2009 and selecting internally between 2006 and 2008. A televote was principally used to determine the nation's points, however, due to the country's small population, on occasion a jury was required as the number of votes received from the Andorran public was deemed too low to be considered valid.

== Participation ==
Participation in the Eurovision Song Contest is open to members of the European Broadcasting Union (EBU), of which Ràdio i Televisió d'Andorra (RTVA) is a member since 2002. Interest in Andorran participation in the contest was first raised in 2003, when the country's then-head of government Marc Forné Molné indicated his agreement for the country to enter the contest, seeing it as a way to raise their profile at a reasonable cost. Andorra Televisió subsequently broadcast that year's contest as a passive participant, a prerequisite step for participation in the following year's event under the rules of the contest in place at the time. RTVA later confirmed its intention to submit an entry for the 2004 contest, with backing from the Andorran government and an assurance that the Catalan language would be represented in the Eurovision Song Contest for the first time.

== History ==
For its first Eurovision appearance, an agreement was announced between RTVA and Televisió de Catalunya (TVC) to jointly organise Andorra's first national final, with viewers in Catalonia being given a say in who should represent the country in the 2004 contest. Viewers and an assembled jury subsequently chose Marta Roure with "Jugarem a estimar-nos" as Andorra's first entry; ultimately the nation did not fare well, placing 18th of the 22 participating countries in the semi-final, receiving 12 points in total, all from Spain, and failing to qualify for the grand final.

After debating employing an internal selection to determine Andorra's second entry, a second national final was organised ahead of the 2005 contest. Marian van de Wal was chosen to perform "La mirada interior" at the contest, however Andorra once again failed to qualify for the final, placing 23rd of 25 countries in the 2005 semi-final with 27 points.

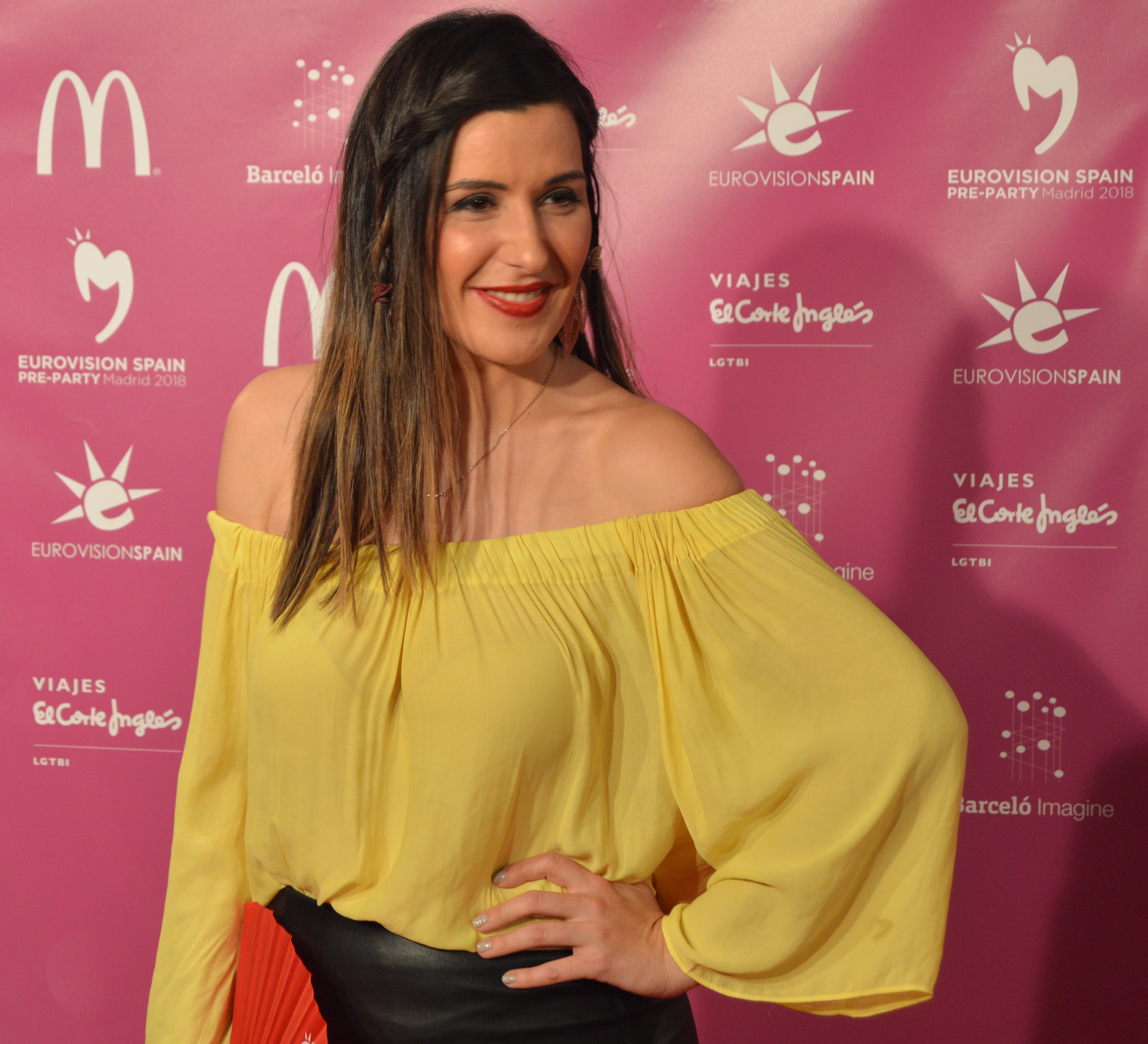
Jenny (pictured in 2018) represented Andorra in 2006.

RTVA initiated an internal selection to determine its entry for the 2006 contest, selecting "Sense tu" performed by Jenny; the nation's third appearance would bring its worst result to date, placing last in the semi-final and receiving just eight points. Further internal selections followed in 2007 and 2008, however neither Anonymous nor Gisela could bring Andorra to the final in either of the contests. RTVA reverted to a national final for the 2009 contest, with Susanne Georgi selected by the Andorran public and jury to represent the country with "La teva decisió (Get a Life)"; on its sixth appearance, Andorra continued to fail to pass through the semi-final, placing 15th in the first semi-final with eight points and failing to qualify for the final.

Andorra is the only country to have never participated in a final; 2007 remains the country's best result to date, when Anonymous placed 12th in that year's semi-final with 80 points, 11 points away from qualifying.

=== Withdrawal ===
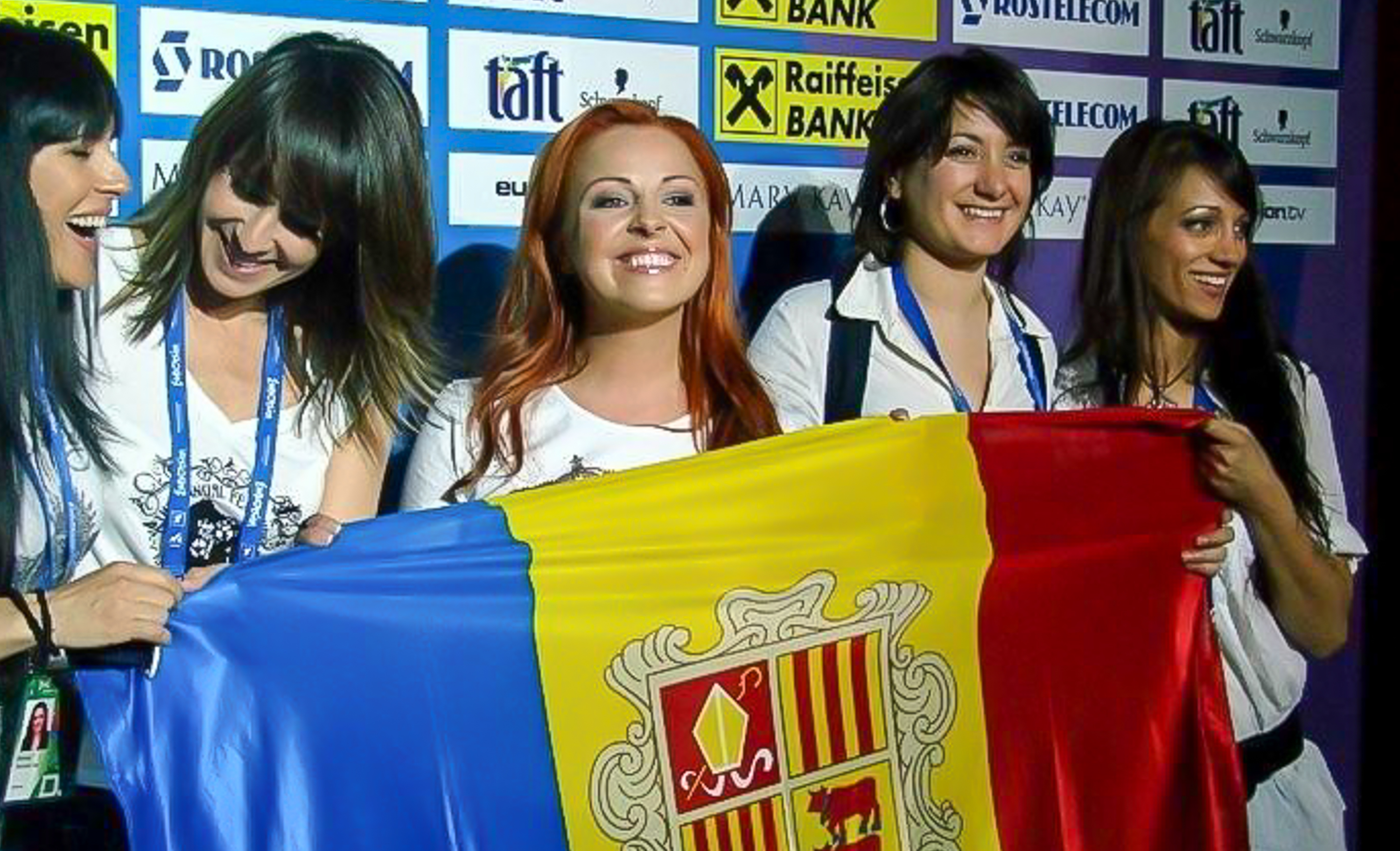
Susanne Georgi and backing singers at the 2009 contest

After initially applying to take part in the Eurovision Song Contest 2010 in Oslo, Norway, RTVA subsequently announced its withdrawal from the contest, citing financial difficulties. The country has not returned to the contest since. Budget restrictions have continued to prevent Andorra from returning to the contest, with RTVA having previously considered leaving the EBU in order to recoup costs, which would have prevented any further Andorran participation in the event. In recent years, renewed interest in the contest has been reported among some members of the Andorran government, with past Andorran Eurovision artists having also been vocal in their support for a return of the nation to the contest. Georgi, Andorra's last participant, also started a campaign to secure a potential sponsorship which would enable Andorra to return to the contest and lobbied with Andorran politicians on this idea.

On 4 February 2025, Catalan radio station RAC 1 reported that Catalan broadcaster TV3 was in talks with RTVA with a proposal to collaborate on a potential return of the latter to the contest in 2026. According to reports, it was proposed that TV3's music talent show Eufòria would be used to select Andorra's Eurovision representative. On 26 May 2025, RTVA confirmed it would not participate in 2026 and would not collaborate with TV3 for a possible return.

=== Selection process ===
Andorra has used a mix of methods to select its entries for the contest, having employed both national finals and internal selections. For its debut entry, RTVA launched a casting show, Eurocàsting, to determine two acts to take part in the national final. The selected acts performed 12 potential Eurovision songs over nine weeks on 12 punts, with songs being eliminated weekly until the winning song and artist was determined in the final show. Eurocàsting returned in 2005, but with one winning artist selected to perform three songs in the single final show Desitja'm sort. Following internal selections between 2006 and 2008, RTVA employed a televised competition again in 2009, with three acts competing in Passaport a Moscou.

=== Voting ===
In the years where Andorra participated, voting at the Eurovision Song Contest typically consisted of 100 percent public televoting, with countries obligated to use televoting as the method for determining their points from the 2004 contest. However, each country was obligated to assemble a back-up jury, whose votes would be used instead of the televote in cases of technical failure, or from 2005 when the number of televotes registered failed to pass a certain threshold. RTVA utilised SMS voting to determine the country's points during the shows in which Andorra participated, however on occasion the back-up jury results were required to be implemented as the number of votes received was considered too low to provide a valid result. This occurred in 2005 and 2007, when the votes of Andorra's back-up jury were used instead to provide the Andorran votes in both the semi-final and final.

== Participation overview ==
Table key
◁	Last place

Year	Artist	Song	Language	Final	Points	Semi	Points
2004	Marta Roure	"Jugarem a estimar-nos"	Catalan	Failed to qualify		18	12
2005	Marian van de Wal	"La mirada interior"	Catalan	Failed to qualify		23	27
2006	Jenny	"Sense tu"	Catalan	Failed to qualify		23 ◁	8
2007	Anonymous	"Salvem el món"	Catalan, English	Failed to qualify		12	80
2008	Gisela	"Casanova"	English	Failed to qualify		15	22
2009	Susanne Georgi	"La teva decisió (Get a Life)"	Catalan, English	Failed to qualify		15	8

== Related involvement ==
=== Heads of delegation ===
Each participating broadcaster in the Eurovision Song Contest assigns a head of delegation as the EBU's contact person and the leader of their delegation at the event. The delegation, whose size can greatly vary, includes a head of press, the performers, songwriters, composers, and backing vocalists, among others.

Heads of delegation
Year	Name	Ref.
2005–2009	Creu Rosell	

=== Commentators and spokespersons ===
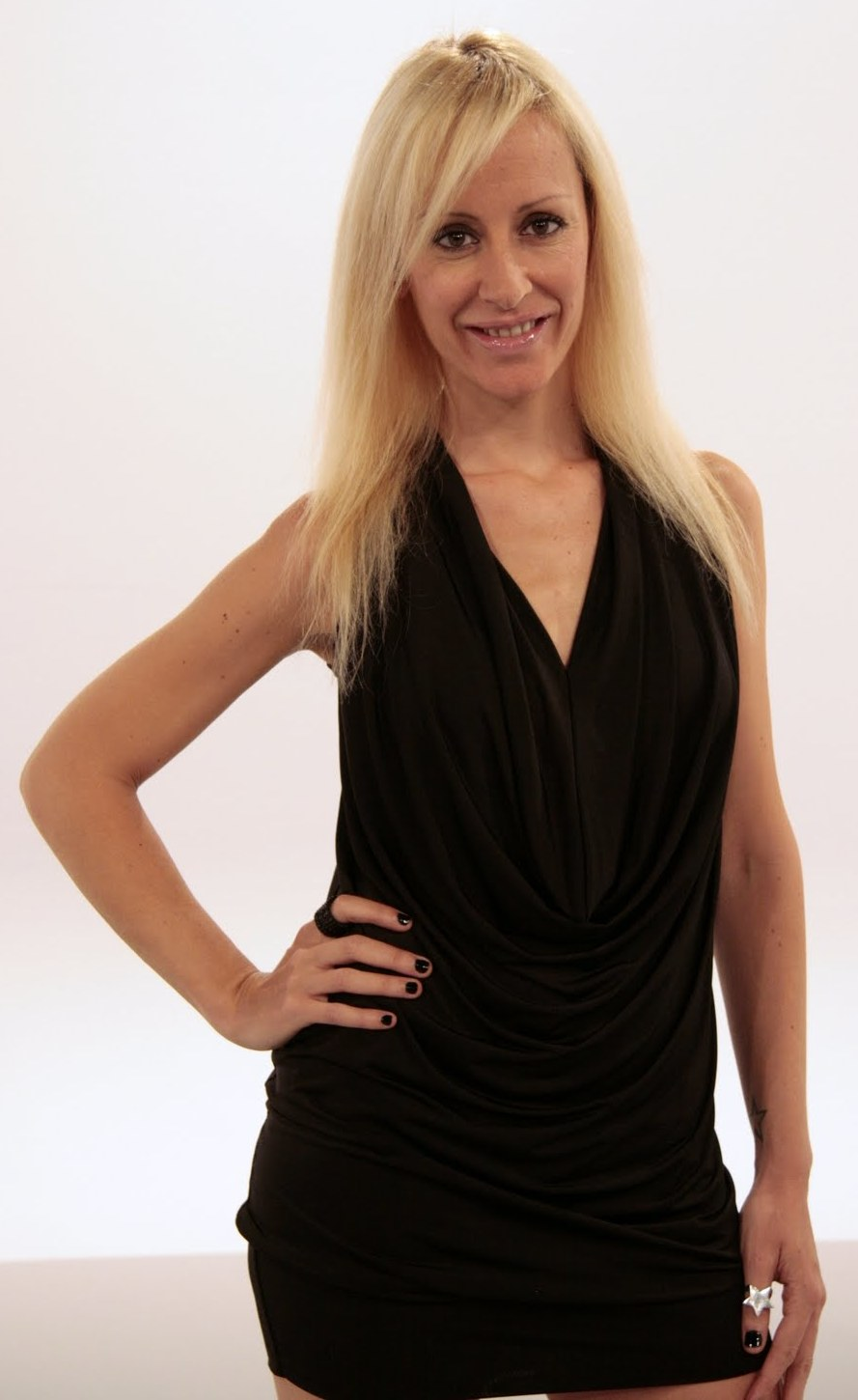
Meri Picart provided commentary on ATV between 2003 and 2009

For the show's broadcast on Andorra Televisió (ATV), various commentators have provided commentary for the contest in the local language. At the Eurovision Song Contest after all points are calculated, the presenters of the show call upon each voting country to invite each respective spokesperson to announce the results of their vote on-screen.

Commentators and spokespersons
Year(s)	Commentator	Dual commentator	Spokesperson	Ref.
2003	Meri Picart	Albert Roig	Did not participate	
2004	Meri Picart	Josep Lluís Trabal	Pati Molné	
2005	Meri Picart	Josep Lluís Trabal	Ruth Gumbau	
2006	Meri Picart	Josep Lluís Trabal	Xavi Palma	
2007	Meri Picart	Josep Lluís Trabal	Marian van de Wal	
2008	Meri Picart	Josep Lluís Trabal	Alfred Llahí	
2009	Meri Picart	None	Brigits García	
2010–2026	No broadcast		Did not participate	

== Photo gallery ==
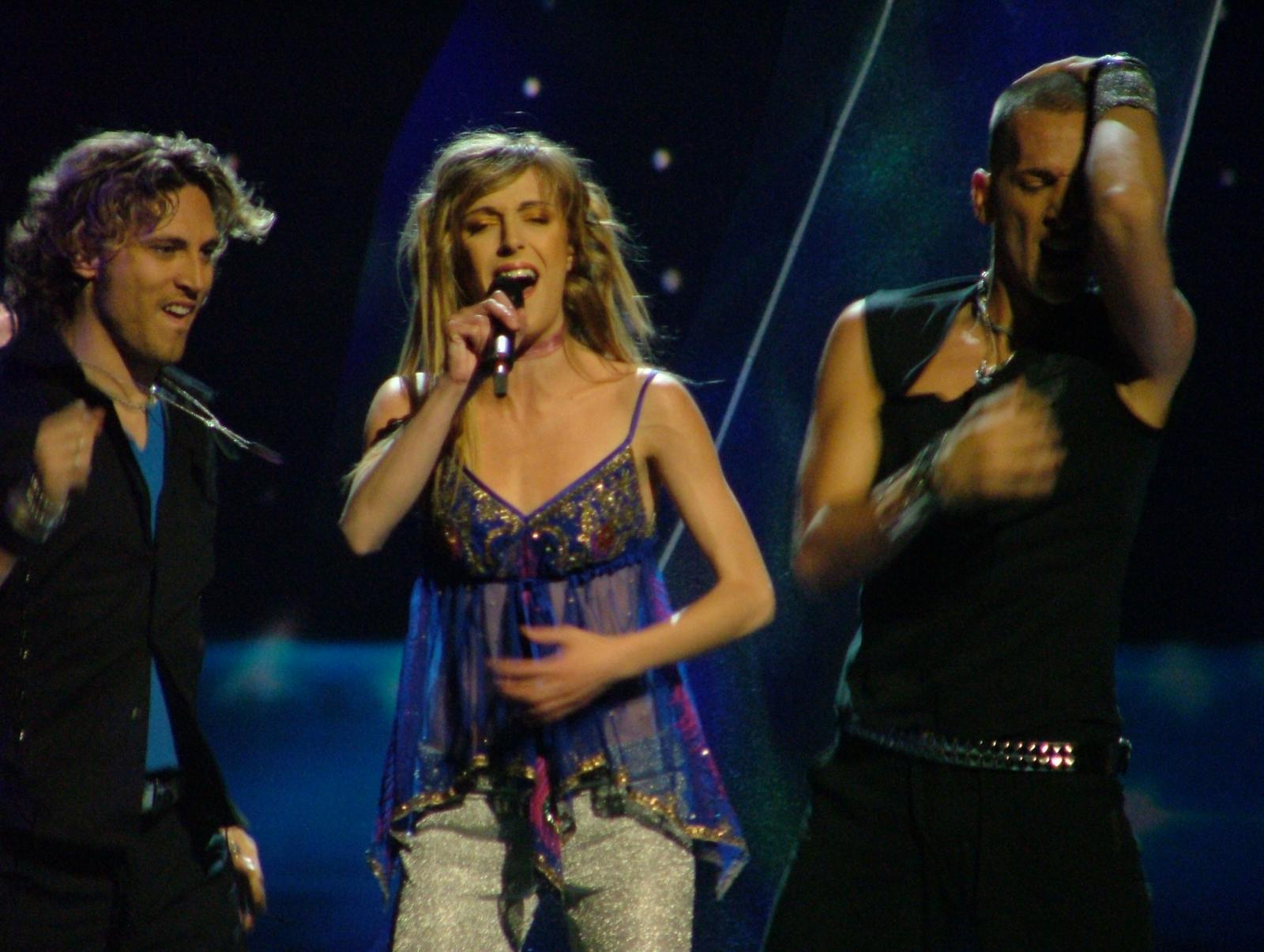
Marta Roure in Istanbul (2004)

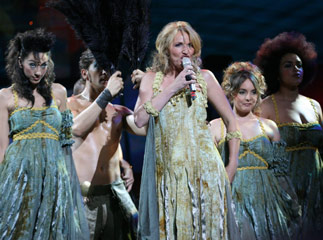
Marian van de Wal in Kyiv (2005)

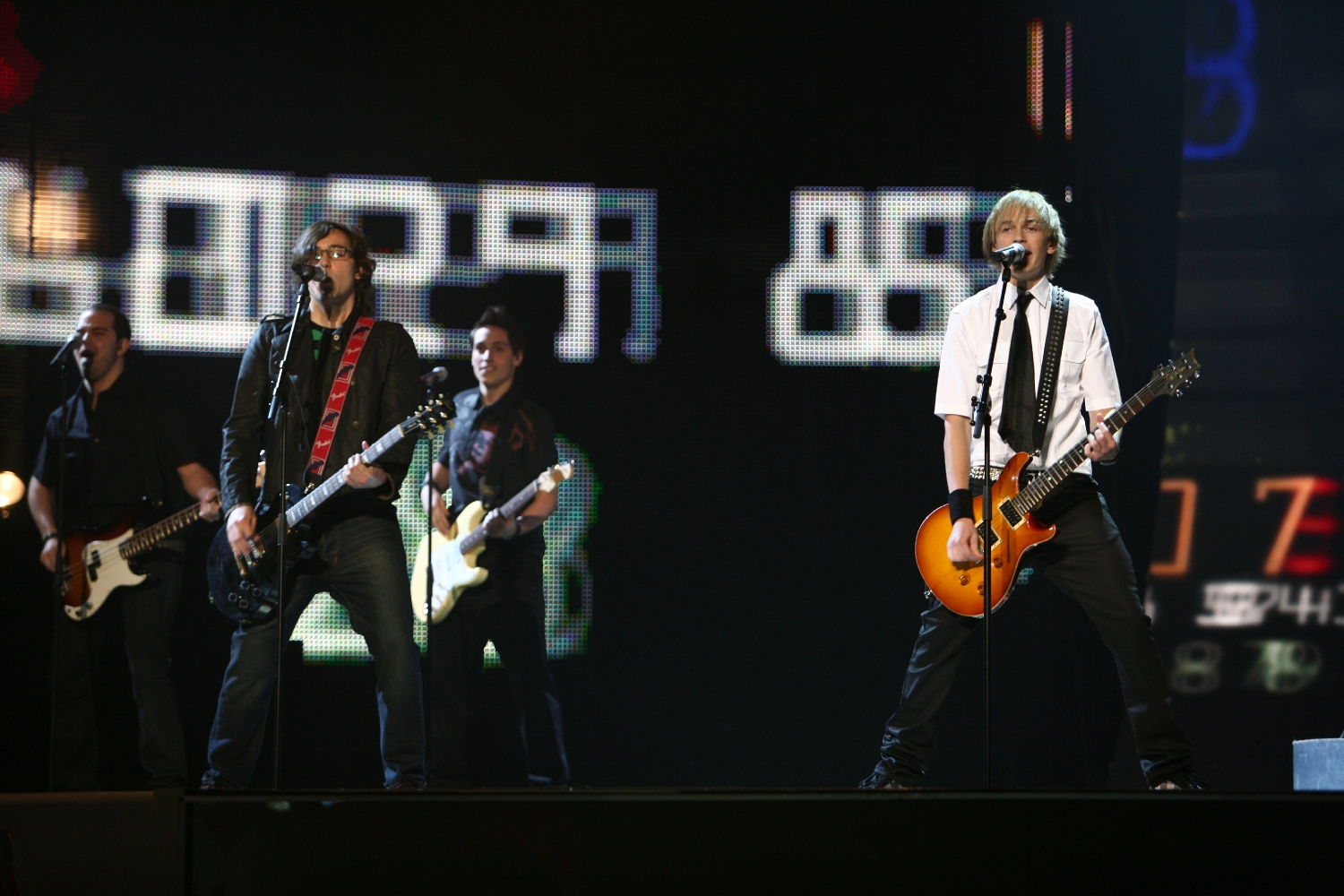
Anonymous in Helsinki (2007)

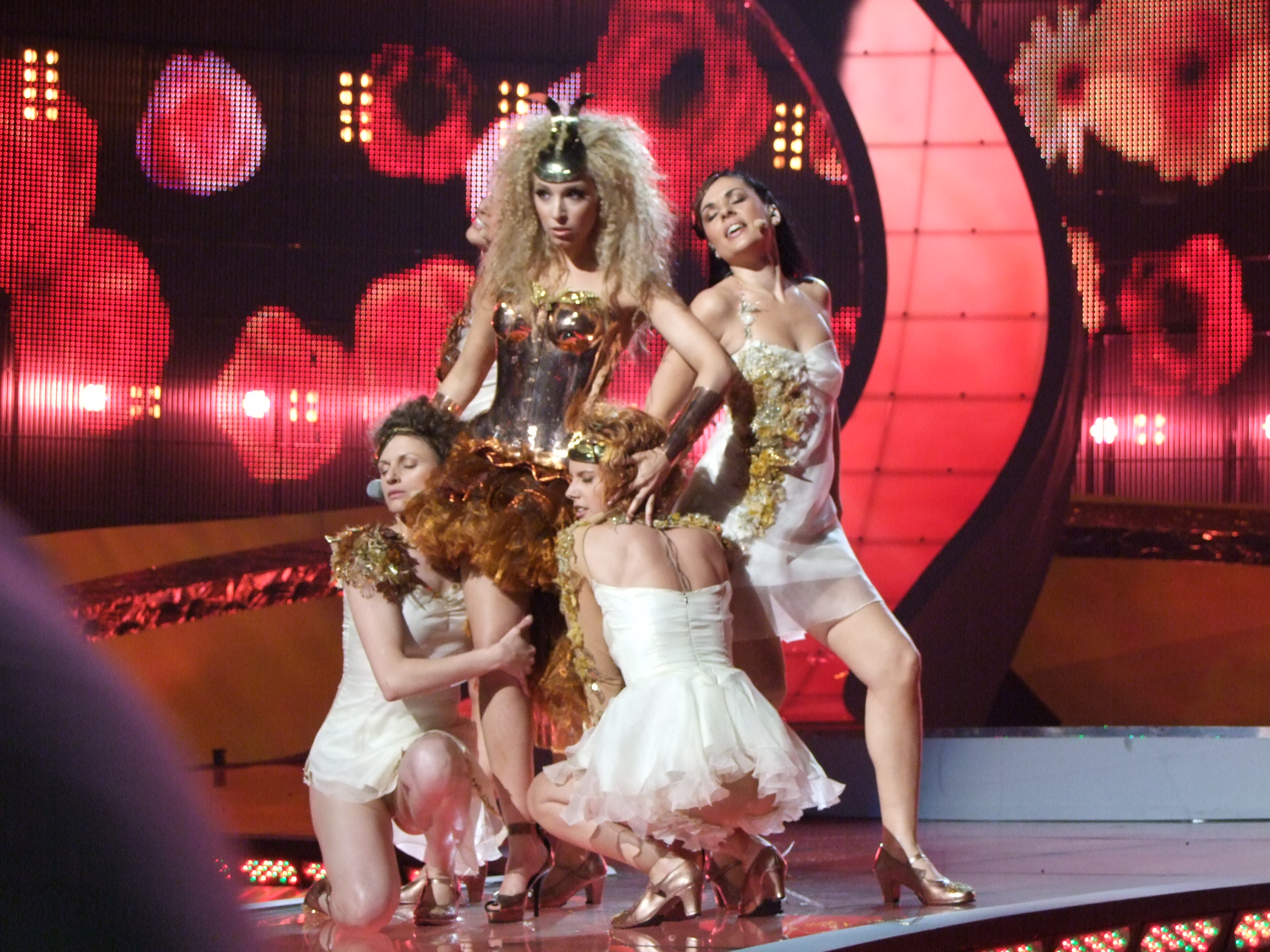
Gisela in Belgrade (2008)

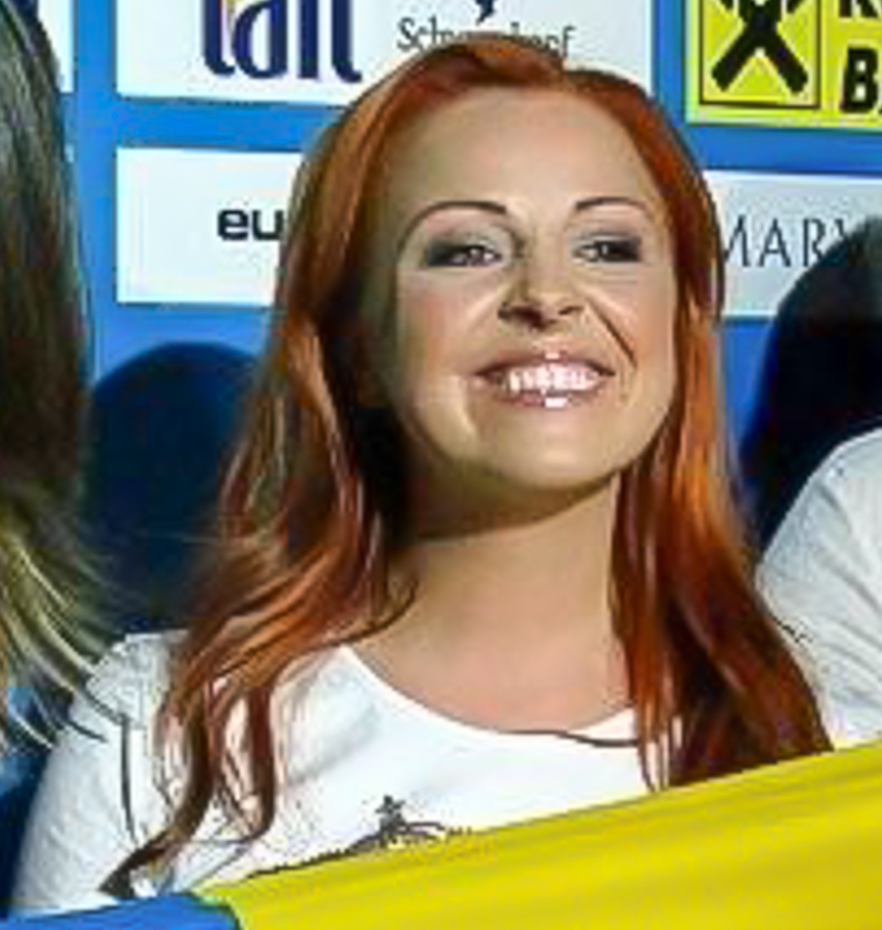
Susanne Georgi in Moscow (2009)
