= Television in Andorra =

The first legal television broadcasts in Andorra date back to the 1970s. The Andorran television scene is the direct result of the country's complex history, which can be explained by the balanced cultural, political and social relations of the European microstate with the two neighboring countries, France and Spain. Thus, Andorra had first time a color television input, although for a while it shared the signal with black and white. The incorporation of the country into the digital era was, however, quite leading. Andorra is the third European country, after Finland and Luxembourg, to have switched off the analogue signal. The Andorran television channel Andorra Televisió was launched in 1995.

== History ==
Having political conflicts with its neighbours over the implementation of telegraph, telephone and radio, made the introduction of television in Andorra very late.

There is news from the 1950s about the use of televisions in Andorran bars. But it was not until the arrival of color television, introduced in France before Spain, that the Andorran authorities decided to take an interest in television. Therefore, the Andorran Parliament, which had its own government only since the 1980s, decided in 1967 to contact the French co-prince in order to find out how to obtain permits and licenses to broadcast television in Andorra.

Following the traditional diplomatic criteria with France and Spain, the first French and Spanish television channels can be seen from the 1970s. This justified setting up an Andorran company to manage the television offer; Servei de Telecomunicacions d'Andorra (STA), the current Andorra Telecom.

In the 1980s, Andorra received a government for the first time and, with it, separated, albeit rhetorically, the executive of the parliament under Montesquian criteria: government, parliament and courts. This is important since it is under the first government that a whole process began that culminated in the conversion of Ràdio Andorra into the current Ràdio i Televisió d'Andorra. In the 1990s, Ràdio Andorra was formally transformed into a new public entity, responsible for broadcasting not only radio, but also television.

== Digital terrestrial television ==
On 25 September 2007 at 11pm, Andorra became one of the first European countries to switch off all terrestrial analogue transmissions, making TDT the only method of terrestrial TV reception in the country. The service is operated jointly by the Andorran Government and the country's telecommunications company Andorra Telecom. As well as offering Andorra's only TV Channel ATV, the service offers various channels from Spain and France. It is also one of the few terrestrial television services to offer the BBC World News channel.

Language	Country	Television channel	Radio channel	Owner	MUX
Catalan	Andorra	Andorra TV HD	Ràdio Nacional d'Andorra; Andorra Música	Ràdio i Televisió d'Andorra (RTVA)	42
Catalan	Spain	TV3 HD; Super3 / El 33; Esport3; 3/24	Catalunya Ràdio	CCMA	28; 34; 42; 45
Catalan	Spain	8TV HD	RAC 1	OC 2022	25
Catalan	Spain	Pirineus TV HD	Ràdio Valira	Cadena Pirenaica de Ràdio i Televisió	34
Spanish	Spain	La 1 HD; La 2 HD; Teledeporte HD	Ràdio 4 Radio Exterior	RTVE	25; 42; 45
Spanish	Spain	Antena 3 HD; La Sexta HD	Onda Cero	Atresmedia	36; 45
Spanish	Spain	Cuatro HD; Telecinco HD		Mediaset España	28; 36
Spanish	Spain		Cadena SER	Prisa	36
Spanish	Spain		COPE	Radio Popular	28
French	France	TF1 HD		Groupe TF1	42
French	France	France 2 HD; France 3 HD		France Télévisions	45
French	France	M6 HD		Groupe M6	42
French	France	Arte HD		Arte GEIE	28
French	France	TV5Monde HD		TV5Monde	34
French	France	Euronews		Euronews	34
French	France		RFI	France Médias Monde	45
French	Belgium		La Première	RTBF	34
French	Switzerland		La Première	SRG SSR	34
Portuguese	Portugal	RTP Internacional	Antena 1	RTP	28
Portuguese	Portugal	TVI Internacional	Rádio Comercial	Media Capital	25
English	United Kingdom	BBC World News HD	BBC Radio	BBC	28
English	United States	CNN International	CNN Radio	Warner Bros. Discovery	36

Former channels:

- Al Jazeera English
- Direct 8
- DW-TV
- Love Nature
- SIC Internacional
- C8
- NRJ 12

== Pay television ==
Andorra Telecom started providing pay-TV through IPTV technology following the completion of the transition from ADSL to fiber in 2010. Andorra Telecom has signed a contract with Movistar to broadcast their television package. In addition to the free channels and the Spanish Movistar+ channels, it also includes French channels France 5, Franceinfo, France24, W9, TMC, TFX, BFM TV and Gulli and other channels like Cubavision, CNBC Europe, Bloomberg, Fox News, Russia Today, Al Jazeera English and i24 News.

=== Sant Julià de Lòria ===
Mútua Eléctrica, however, has been offering cable television in the southern city of Sant Julià de Lòria, since the introduction of pay television in Spain.
