= Marian van de Wal =

Dutch singer and hotelier (born 1970)

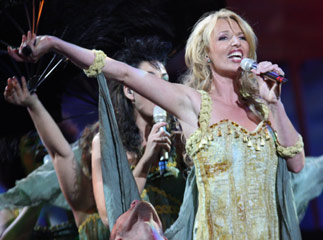
- Van de Wal in 2005

Background information
- Also known as: Marie-An
- Born: 21 January 1970 (age 56); Vianen, Netherlands
- Origin: L'Aldosa, Andorra
- Occupations: Singer; hotelier

Marian van de Wal (born 21 January 1970), also known professionally as Marie-An, is a Dutch singer and hotelier based in Andorra. She is known for representing Andorra in the Eurovision Song Contest 2005 in Kyiv, Ukraine with the song "La mirada interior".

== Biography ==
Van de Wal was born in Vianen, Netherlands. In 1999, she moved to Andorra with her partner to run a hotel in L'Aldosa de la Massana.

In 2004, Van de Wal entered the Andorran national selection for the Eurovision Song Contest 2005 and was chosen as one of three finalists. During the final on 18 December 2004 in Andorra la Vella, she won the right to represent the country, finishing ahead of Mar Capdevila and Ishtar Ruiz. A month later, on 22 January 2005 in Sant Julià de Lòria, she performed three potential Eurovision entries: "No demanis", "Dóna'm la pau", and "La mirada interior". The latter was selected and went on to represent Andorra in the Eurovision Song Contest.

In Kyiv, Van de Wal failed to qualify for the final, finishing 23rd out of 25 entries in the semi-final. During her performance, she was accompanied by backing vocals from Spanish singer Anabel Conde, who had represented Spain at the 1995 contest. Van de Wal later returned to the 2007 contest as the Andorran spokesperson, announcing the votes on behalf of Ràdio i Televisió d'Andorra (RTVA).

Since 2018, Van de Wal and her family have been running a Pierre & Vacances hotel in Arans. In 2026, she appeared in the third season of the Dutch reality dating programme Winter vol liefde, in which her son André was a candidate.

== Discography ==
=== Singles ===
- 2005 – "La mirada interior"
- 2005 – "A Look Inside Yourself"

Awards and achievements
Preceded by Marta Roure with "Jugarem a estimar-nos	Andorra in the Eurovision Song Contest; 2005	Succeeded by Jenny with "Sense tu"
