= Andorra Telecom =

Telecommunications company in Andorra

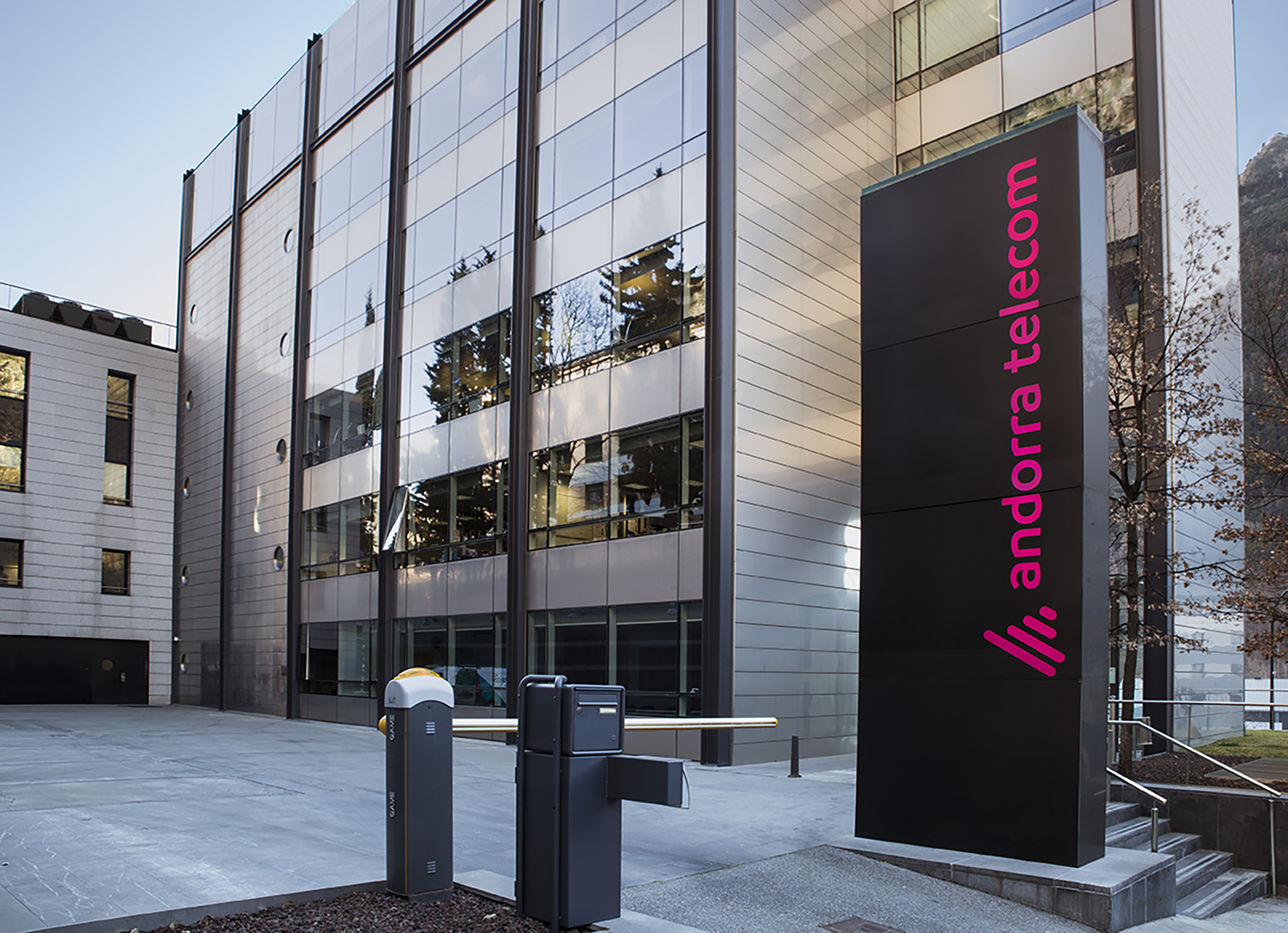
- Andorra Telecom headquarters in Santa Coloma, Andorra
- Type: Public company
- Industry: Communications Services
- Predecessor: Servei de Telecommunicacions d'Andorra
- Headquarters: Carrer Mossèn Lluís Pujol, 8, AD500 Santa Coloma, Andorra
- Area served: Andorra
- Key people: Jordi Alcobé Font (President); Jordi Nadal Bentade (director)
- Products: Fixed-line telephony; Mobile telephony; Broadband; Internet services; Fibre-optic communication; Digital television; IT services
- Revenue: 102 million (2024)
- Owner: Government of Andorra
- Number of employees: 408 (2024)
- ASN: 6752
- Traffic Levels: 20-50 Gbps
- Website: www.andorratelecom.ad

Andorra Telecom is the sole operator of land telephone, mobile telephone, pay television and Internet in Andorra, a telecommunication monopoly. It is a public company owned by the Andorran Government.

AT also manages the technical infrastructures of digital terrestrial television in Andorra, taking both the national television channels and some Spanish and French DTT channels to the whole territory. It also has a deal with the Spanish company Telefónica to offer the pay platform Movistar Plus+ in Andorra.

In October 2018, it had 38,464 fixed telephone lines contracted, 81,697 mobile telephone lines and 34,624 Internet lines, all of them through FTTH, becoming a pioneer country where all their citizens have access to the Internet through optical fiber.

The company is managed by a board of directors responsible before the General Council for the management, direction and representation of the service, also the administration and regulation of its assets and resources.

== Services ==
- Broadcast through deals between other television channels:
  - All the channels broadcast in Spain by the Movistar Plus+ platform (family package).
  - All the channels broadcast by the Movistar Plus+ platform (family package) at a regional level in Catalonia.
  - All the channels broadcast on DTT in Andorra.

== See also ==
- List of mobile network operators in Europe
