= Marta Roure =

Andorran singer and actress (born 1981)

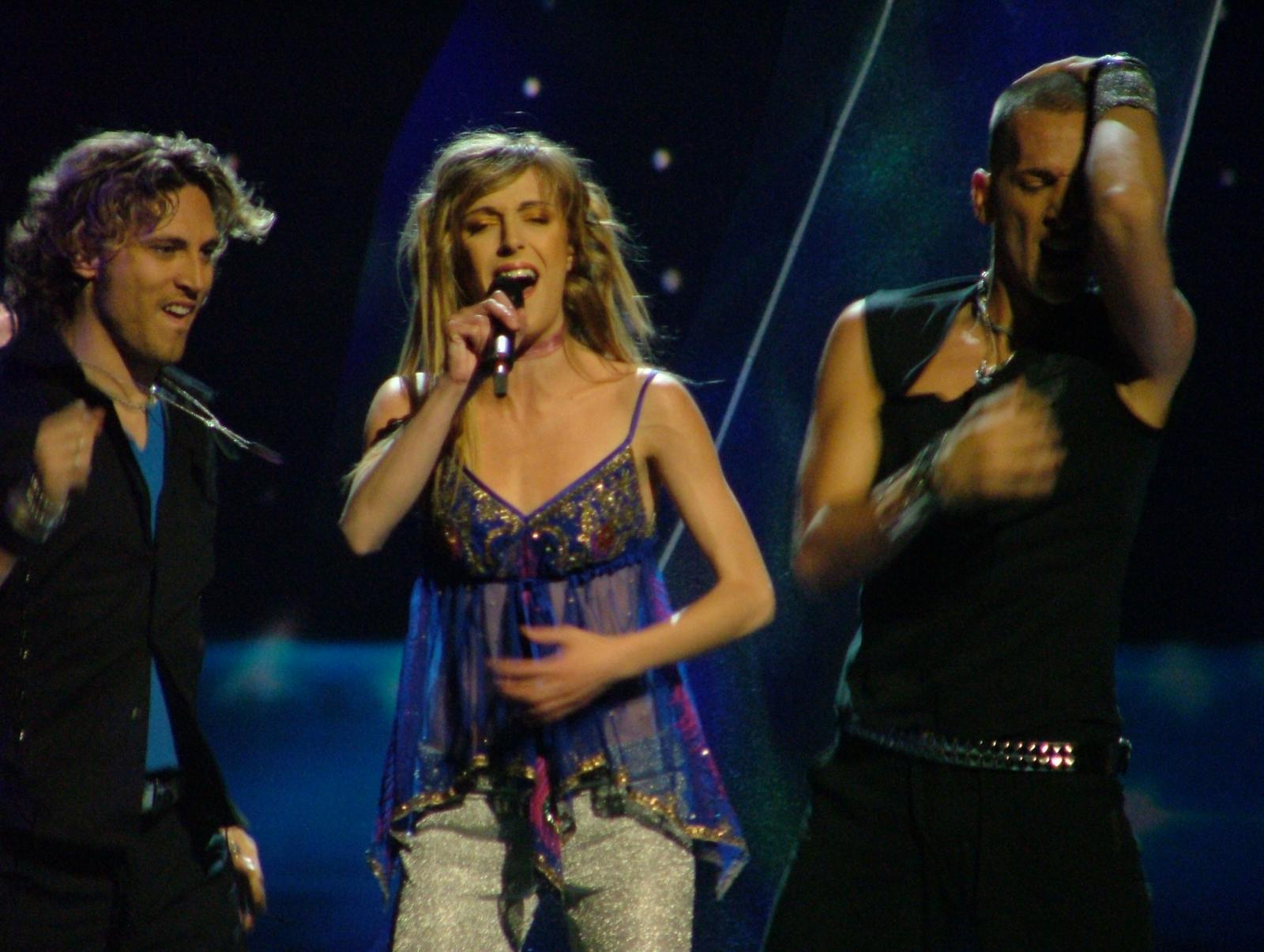
- Marta Roure performing at the Eurovision Song Contest 2004.

Background information
- Born: Marta Roure i Besolí; 16 January 1981 (age 45); Andorra la Vella, Andorra
- Genres: Pop, pop rock
- Occupations: Singer, actress
- Instruments: Vocals, piano
- Years active: 2002—present
- Label: Música Global Discogràfica
- Website: Official Website

Marta Roure i Besolí (born 16 January 1981) is an Andorran singer and actress. She represented Andorra in the Eurovision Song Contest 2004 with her song "Jugarem a estimar-nos", earning the eighteenth place in the semifinal. It was the first time a song in Catalan language was performed at the Eurovision Song Contest, as well as Andorra's debut at the competition.

== Early and personal life ==
She was born on 16 January 1981 in Andorra la Vella, Andorra, into a music family. Her great-grandfather, Joan Roure i Riu, was a trumpeter, her grandfather Joan Roure i Jané was a sardana composer, her aunt Meritxell Roure i Morist has been a piano teacher, and her father Jordi Roure i Torra a band director, trumpeter and trumpet teacher. Marta has a sister, Anna, who is a piano teacher. She was born in Andorra, but she spent her youth in France.

Marta gave birth to a boy in 2002 named Julen.

== Musical career ==
Marta Roure attended until 4th course of Sol-fa and 3rd of piano at the Conservatoire of Andorra. She attended first course of guitar and song at the Music School in Lleida and studies of musical theater at Youkali school in Barcelona, with Marc Montserrat, "el Sueco" and Susanna Egea as teachers of interpretation, Emma Reverter as teacher of Dance Jazz, Rosa Mateu in spoken voice technics, Enric Torner as teacher of claque, Josep Maria Borràs teacher of sol-fa and repertoire, and Fulgenci Mestres and Carme Sánchez teachers of song. She also attended an intensive course in commedia dell'arte with Ester Cort at the "Col·legi de Teatre" in Barcelona.

Before she worked as a health technician in Andorra la Vella, but for 19 years she had been involved with dance, the sportive and rhythmical gymnastics and the "esbart dansaire". She has been in Barcelona under the theatrical orders of Joan Ollé interpreting the work of Choral "theater Romput". She has done small collaborations in written press and in Ràdio Principat and Ràdio Estel. At present she lives in Andorra, is studying Juridical Sciences, and is the voice of "De Bar en Bar" and also collaborates in concerts of other formations.

In 2004, Roure was chosen to represent Andorra in the Eurovision Song Contest 2004 with her song "Jugarem a estimar-nos", following a programme on the Andorra Televisió. It was the first time Andorra competed at the Eurovision Song Contest, and the first time a song in Catalan language was performed at the competition. Eventually, Roure earned twelve points and placed the eighteenth in the semifinal, and did not advance to the final. Shortly after, on 8 November 2004, she released her debut album Nua (Catalan: Naked).

== Discography ==
=== Studio albums ===
- 2004 — Nua

=== Singles ===
- 2004 — "Jugarem a estimar-nos"

== See also ==
- Andorra in the Eurovision Song Contest
- Andorra in the Eurovision Song Contest 2004
- Eurovision Song Contest 2004

Awards and achievements
Preceded by None	Andorra in the Eurovision Song Contest; 2004	Succeeded by Marian van de Wal with "La mirada interior"
