= Andorra in the Eurovision Song Contest 2004 =

- Eurovision Song Contest 2004
- Participating broadcaster: Ràdio i Televisió d'Andorra (RTVA)
- Country: Andorra
- Selection process: 12 Punts
- Selection date: 15 March 2004

Competing entry
- Song: "Jugarem a estimar-nos"
- Artist: Marta Roure
- Songwriters: Jofre Bardagí

Placement
- Semi-final result: Failed to qualify (18th)

Participation chronology

Andorra was represented at the Eurovision Song Contest 2004 with the song "Jugarem a estimar-nos", written by Jofre Bardagí, and performed by Marta Roure. The Andorran participating broadcaster, Ràdio i Televisió d'Andorra (RTVA), organised the national final 12 Punts in order to select its entry for the contest. This was the first-ever entry from Andorra in the Eurovision Song Contest, and the first-ever entry performed in Catalan in the contest.

The national final took place over four stages and nine televised shows, resulting in the selection of Marta Roure as the winning artist and "Jugarem a estimar-nos" as the winning song during the final on 15 March 2004.

Andorra competed in the semi-final of the Eurovision Song Contest which took place on 12 May 2004. Performing during the show in position 6, "Jugarem a estimar-nos" was not announced among the top 10 entries of the semi-final and therefore did not qualify to compete in the final. It was later revealed that Andorra placed eighteenth out of the 22 participating countries in the semi-final with 12 points.

== Background ==
On 6 March 2003, the Andorran national broadcaster, Ràdio i Televisió d'Andorra (RTVA), confirmed its intentions to debut at the Eurovision Song Contest in its 2004 edition after broadcasting the contest in 2003 and receiving approval from the Andorran government which saw the contest as a way to raise its profile at a reasonable cost. As part of its duties as participating broadcaster, RTVA organized the selection of its entry in the contest and broadcast the event in the country. On 7 September 2003, RTVA announced that it would organize a national final to select its entry, while a collaboration with Catalan broadcaster Televisió de Catalunya (TVC) for the national final was announced on 24 November 2003.

== Before Eurovision ==
=== 12 Punts ===
12 Punts (12 Points) was the national final that selected the Andorran entry for the Eurovision Song Contest 2004. The competition was a collaboration between Andorran broadcaster RTVA and Catalan broadcaster TVC, and consisted of nine shows that commenced on 18 January 2004 and concluded with the final on 15 March 2004. All shows took place at the Auditori Nacional d'Andorra in Ordino, hosted by Pati Molné and Xavier Graset and broadcast in Andorra on ATV as well as in Catalonia on TV3 and via radio on Catalunya Cultura.

==== Format ====
The selection of the Andorran Eurovision entry took place over four stages. The first stage, entitled Eurocàsting, took place between 26 October and 20 December 2003 and involved 40 candidates being presented to the public, with two artists being ultimately selected to proceed to the second stage of the competition. Eurocàsting was initially set to take place between November 2003 and January 2004 in the format of a talent show similar to the Spanish Operación Triunfo, however the concept was not pursued further. The six televised Heats which took place between 18 January and 22 February 2004 with two songs competing in each show. One song was selected to proceed from each heat to the third stage, the semi-finals, which took place on 1 and 8 March 2004 with three songs, one of them being performed as a duet between the two finalists, competing in each show. One song was selected to proceed from each semi-final to the final. The fourth stage was the final, which took place on 15 March 2004 and featured the two songs that qualified from the semi-finals being performed by the two finalists. The winning artist and song was selected separately during the final, with the artist selection taking place throughout the nine shows of 12 Punts. The results of all shows were determined by a combination of votes from a five-member professional jury and a public televote via SMS in Andorra and Catalonia. Each juror had an equal stake in the final result, while the televote in each state/region had a weighting equal to the votes of a single juror.

The members of the jury panel were:

- Marcos Llunas – musician, Spanish representative at the Eurovision Song Contest 1997
- Salvador Cufí – representative of the record company Música Global
- Catheryne Metayer – director of the Petits Cantors del Principat d'Andorra
- Josep Maria Escribano – director of the Conservatory of Andorra
- Oriol Vilella – musician

==== Eurocàsting ====
Auditions for Eurocàsting took place between 24 and 26 October 2003 at the Andorra la Vella Fair. Applicants were required to have Andorran citizenship or residency as of 2002 and fluency in Catalan. 40 candidates were selected from 75 applicants and were presented to the public via postcard specials broadcast during introductory shows held until 28 November 2004 on the ATV programme L'aigua clara, hosted by Albert Roig. The combination of votes from the five-member jury and a public televote that registered 16,000 votes determined the top six candidates to qualify for the next stage, which were announced during a special show on 29 November 2003. The six candidates were joined by an additional three artists invited by RTVA to directly compete in the next stage as established artists with continuous participation in musical performances or having released a CD in the past five years (Bis a Bis, Jordi Botey and Marta Roure) and were further presented on L'aigua clara between 9 and 19 December 2003. The combination of the jury and public vote determined the two artists for 12 Punts, which were announced during an additional show on 20 December 2003. The members of the jury panel for this were:

- Josep Maria Escribano (director of the Conservatory of Andorra),
- Giacomo Marcenaro (music director of the production company MPX),
- Marc Llunas (musician, Spanish representative at the Eurovision Song Contest 1997),
- Meri Picart (presenter)
- Oriol Vilella (musician).

Eurocàsting – 20 December 2003
- Armanda Vasconcelos
- Bis a Bis
- Eva Gómez
- Jordi Botey
- Juanjo García
- Marta Roquet
- Marta Dallerès
- Marta Roure
- Verónica Castro

==== Competing songs ====
A submission period was open for songwriters to submit their songs between 10 November 2003 and 20 December 2003. Songs were required to be in Catalan and those that reflect the culture and identity of Andorra were preferred. Additional songs were also provided by the record company Música Global. Over 60 submissions were received at the conclusion of the submission period and an expert committee selected twelve songs for 12 Punts, which were announced on 1 January 2004. An album containing the competing songs was later released on CD by Música Global with one of the songs, "No és nou" performed by the band Gossos and Spanish Eurovision 2003 contestant Beth, becoming a hit in 2006.

Song	Songwriter(s)
"Anem cap al nord"	Miguel Fortaleza-Rey, Regi Jordy Bardavid
"Confia en mi"	Brigit García
"Crec"	Josep Thió
"El destí"	Natalie Avellaneda, Elena Curto
"Em quedarà"	Xavier Ibañes, Pedro Javier Hermosilla
"És que si"	Manolo Martínez, Genís Segarra
"Jugarem a estimar-nos"	Jofre Bardagí
"No és nou"	Natxo Tarrés
"No esperis amor"	Emili Alquezar
"Si et perds"	Berta Sala
"Terra"	Jordi Vidal
"Vine"	David Ambrojo

==== Heats ====
The six heats of 12 Punts took place between 18 January and 22 February 2004. In each heat two songs, one performed by Bis a Bis and one performed by Marta Roure, competed and the combination of votes from a five-member professional jury (5/7), a public televote in Andorra (1/7) and a public televote in Catalonia (1/7) selected one song to qualify for the semi-finals. In addition to performing their assigned song, both artists performed a part of the other song that competed in their respective heats.

Heat 1 – 18 January 2004
R/O	Artist	Song	Jury	Televote				Total	Place
R/O	Artist	Song	Jury	ATV		TV3		Total	Place
1	Marta Roure	"Jugarem a estimar-nos"	2	72%	1	84%	1	4	1
2	Bis a Bis	"El destí"	3	28%	0	16%	0	3	2

Heat 2 – 25 January 2004
R/O	Artist	Song	Jury	Televote				Total	Place
R/O	Artist	Song	Jury	ATV		TV3		Total	Place
1	Bis a Bis	"Vine"	4	63%	1	45%	0	5	1
2	Marta Roure	"Si et perds"	1	37%	0	55%	1	2	2

Heat 3 – 1 February 2004
R/O	Artist	Song	Jury	Televote				Total	Place
R/O	Artist	Song	Jury	ATV		TV3		Total	Place
1	Marta Roure	"Terra"	4	70%	1	51%	1	6	1
2	Bis a Bis	"És que si"	1	30%	0	49%	0	1	2

Heat 4 – 8 February 2004
R/O	Artist	Song	Jury	Televote				Total	Place
R/O	Artist	Song	Jury	ATV		TV3		Total	Place
1	Bis a Bis	"No esperis amor"	3	38%	0	37%	0	3	2
2	Marta Roure	"Crec"	2	62%	1	63%	1	4	1

Heat 5 – 15 February 2004
R/O	Artist	Song	Jury	Televote				Total	Place
R/O	Artist	Song	Jury	ATV		TV3		Total	Place
1	Marta Roure	"Em quedarà"	4	16%	0	42%	0	4	1
2	Bis a Bis	"Confia en mi"	1	84%	1	58%	1	3	2

Heat 6 – 22 February 2004
R/O	Artist	Song	Jury	Televote				Total	Place
R/O	Artist	Song	Jury	ATV		TV3		Total	Place
1	Bis a Bis	"Anem cap al nord"	2	32%	0	63%	1	3	2
2	Marta Roure	"No és nou"	3	68%	1	37%	0	4	1

==== Semi-finals ====
The two semi-finals of 12 Punts took place on 1 and 8 March 2004. In each semi-final three of the six songs that qualified from the preceding six heats competed; one was performed by Bis a Bis, one was performed by Marta Roure and one was performed by both artists together. The combination of votes from a five-member professional jury (5/7), a public televote in Andorra (1/7) and a public televote in Catalonia (1/7) selected one song to qualify for the final. In addition to the performances of the competing songs, the first semi-final featured an interval act from the band Els Pets, while the second semi-final featured interval acts from the band Gossos and singer Lluís Llach.

Semi-final 1 – 1 March 2004
R/O	Artist	Song	Jury	Televote				Total	Place
R/O	Artist	Song	Jury	ATV		TV3		Total	Place
1	Marta Roure	"No és nou"	3	—	0	—	0	3	2
2	Bis a Bis	"Terra"	2	73%	1	64%	1	4	1
3	Marta Roure and Bis a Bis	"Em quedarà"	0	—	0	—	0	0	3

Semi-final 2 – 8 March 2004
R/O	Artist	Song	Jury	Televote				Total	Place
R/O	Artist	Song	Jury	ATV		TV3		Total	Place
1	Bis a Bis	"Vine"	0	—	0	—	0	0	2
2	Marta Roure	"Jugarem a estimar-nos"	5	57%	1	63%	1	7	1
3	Bis a Bis and Marta Roure	"Crec"	0	—	0	—	0	0	2

==== Final ====
The final of 12 Punts took place on 15 March 2004. Both Bis a Bis and Marta Roure performed the two songs that qualified from the preceding two semi-finals and the combination of votes from a five-member professional jury (5/7), a public televote in Andorra (1/7) and a public televote in Catalonia (1/7) selected "Jugarem a estimar-nos" as the winning song and Marta Roure as the winning artist. In addition to the performances of the competing songs, the show featured an interval act from Spanish Eurovision 2003 contestant Beth.

Song selection – 15 March 2004
R/O	Song	Jury	Televote				Total	Place
R/O	Song	Jury	ATV		TV3		Total	Place
1	"Jugarem a estimar-nos"	4	54%	1	46%	0	5	1
2	"Terra"	1	46%	0	54%	1	2	2

Artist selection – 15 March 2004
R/O	Artist	Jury	Televote				Total	Place
R/O	Artist	Jury	ATV		TV3		Total	Place
1	Marta Roure	3	56%	1	49%	0	4	1
2	Bis a Bis	2	44%	0	51%	1	3	2

== At Eurovision ==
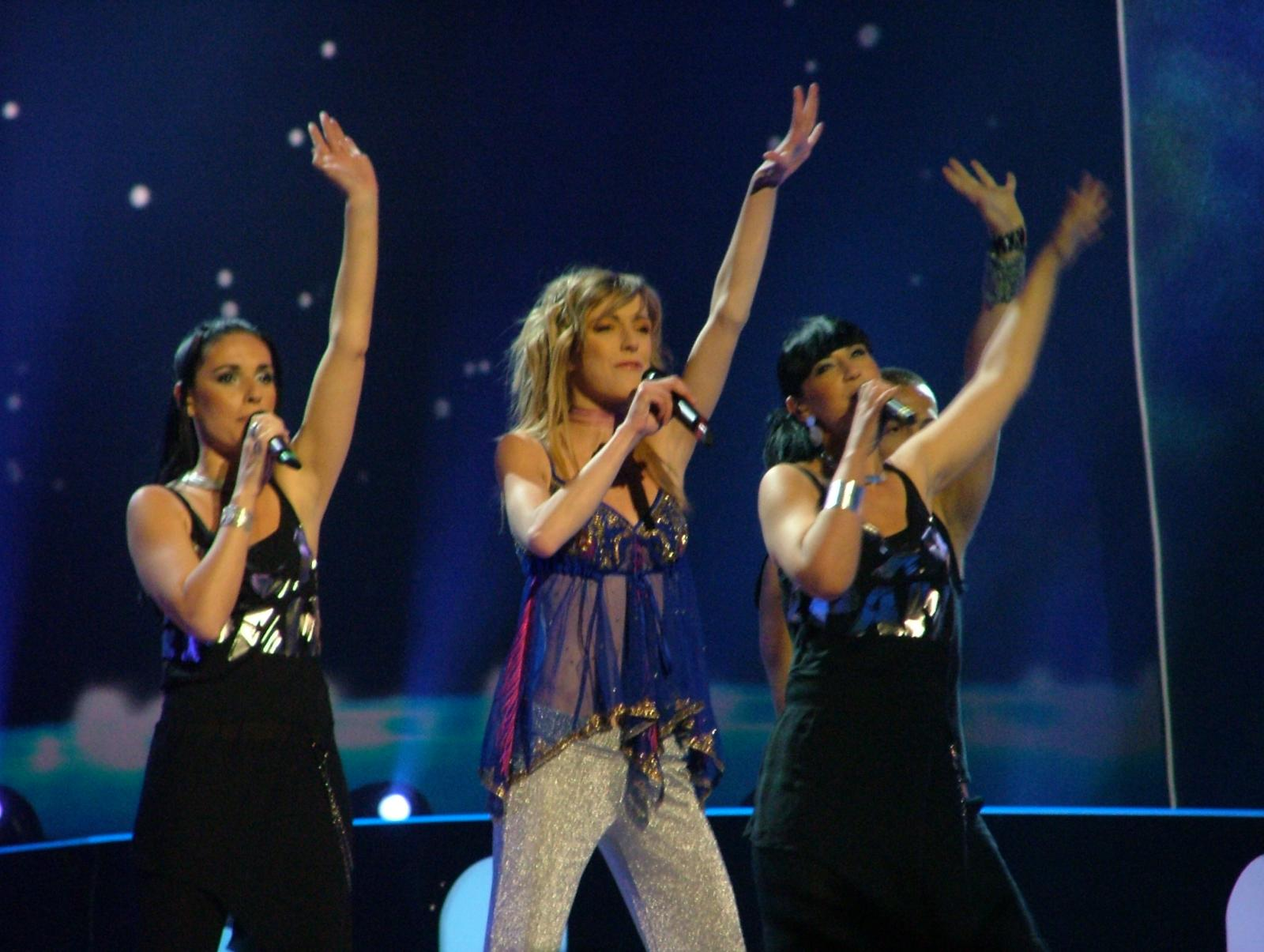
Marta Roure during a rehearsal before the semi-final

It was announced that the competition's format would be expanded to include a semi-final in 2004. According to the rules, all nations with the exceptions of the host country, the "Big Four" (France, Germany, Spain and the United Kingdom) and the ten highest placed finishers in the 2003 contest are required to qualify from the semi-final on 12 May 2004 in order to compete for the final on 15 May 2004; the top ten countries from the semi-final progress to the final. On 23 March 2004, a special allocation draw was held which determined the running order for the semi-final and Andorra was set to perform in position 6, following the entry from Israel and before the entry from Portugal. At the end of the semi-final, Andorra was not announced among the top 10 entries in the semi-final and therefore failed to qualify to compete in the final. It was later revealed that Andorra placed eighteenth in the semi-final, receiving a total of 12 points, all of them which were awarded by Spain.

The semi-final and the final were broadcast in Andorra on ATV with commentary by Meri Picart and Josep Lluís Trabal. The Andorran spokesperson, who announced the Andorran votes during the final, was Pati Molné.

=== Voting ===
Below is a breakdown of points awarded to Andorra and awarded by Andorra in the semi-final and grand final of the contest. The nation awarded its 12 points to Portugal in the semi-final and to Spain in the final of the contest. Following the release of the televoting figures by the EBU after the conclusion of the competition, it was revealed that a total of 4,612 televotes were cast in Andorra during the two shows: 1,609 votes during the semi-final and 3,003 votes during the final.

==== Points awarded to Andorra ====
Points awarded to Andorra (Semi-final)
Score	Country
12 points	Spain
10 points	
8 points	
7 points	
6 points	
5 points	
4 points	
3 points	
2 points	
1 point	

==== Points awarded by Andorra ====
Points awarded by Andorra (Semi-final)
Score	Country
12 points	Portugal
10 points	Ukraine
8 points	Greece
7 points	Netherlands
6 points	Albania
5 points	Malta
4 points	Monaco
3 points	Israel
2 points	Cyprus
1 point	Serbia and Montenegro

Points awarded by Andorra (Final)
Score	Country
12 points	Spain
10 points	Ukraine
8 points	Greece
7 points	France
6 points	Malta
5 points	Sweden
4 points	Cyprus
3 points	Turkey
2 points	Serbia and Montenegro
1 point	Belgium
