= Andorra Televisió =

Andorran public TV channel

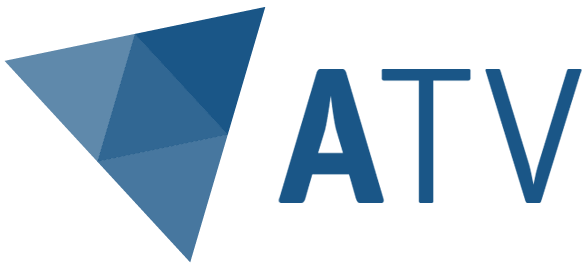
- Country: Andorra
- Broadcast area: Andorra, reaching bordering regions via overspill of the Andorran terrestrial network
- Affiliates: Ràdio Nacional d'Andorra
- Headquarters: Andorra-la-Vella

Programming
- Language: Catalan
- Picture format: 1080i HDTV (downscaled to 16:9 576i for the SDTV feed)

Ownership
- Owner: Ràdio i Televisió d'Andorra

History
- Launched: 4 December 1995; 30 years ago
- Former names: Televisió d'Andorra (TVA)

Availability

Terrestrial
- Televisió Digital Terrestre: Andorra: 1

Andorra Televisió (Catalan pronunciation: [ənˈdorə tələβiziˈo]) is an Andorran free-to-air television channel owned and operated by public broadcaster Ràdio i Televisió d'Andorra (RTVA). It is the company's flagship television channel, and is known for broadcasting mainstream and generalist programming, including l'Informatiu news bulletins, prime time drama, cinema and entertainment, and major breaking news, sports and special events. It was launched on 4 December 1995.

== History ==
The first broadcasts of an experimental service began on 1 January 1991 under the name Televisió d'Andorra (TVA) through the frequency of Canal 33. Several sporadic broadcasts were held between 1991 and 1995.

Test transmissions began the evening of Monday 4 December 1995, still using the frequency of Canal 33, airing a special broadcast spearheaded by important political figures of the time: head of government Marc Forné, general trustee Josep Dallerès, and the president of Organisme de Ràdio i Televisió d'Andorra (ORTA, now RTVA), Enric Tolsa. Over time, it gradually presented its team of journalists and technicians, who started to give headway to the new television channel. The following day, Tuesday 5 December 1995, at 2:45pm, the regular broadcasts started precisely at the moment Ramon Font opened the first newscast of an Andorran television channel, Informatiu Migdia (Midday News); the first news item was the highlight of the day: the premiere of Andorra's public television would mark that day as a milestone in Andorra's history. The technical team was provided by Andorran company Antena 7, who had already made a few broadcasts in the late 80s.

The first drama series created by the channel was broadcast on Monday 1 November 1999. It was called Cim de passions (Height of Passions) and was about a family of hoteliers. The script of the series was written by Marta Cruells, Ester Nadal was in charge of directing the actors and the production was carried out by Raimon Cartró. The plot was adapted to the Andorran reality and focused on the struggles and relationships in a family of hoteliers. It was co-produced by ORTA and Inlingua. Another noteworthy series was Art de Garatge (Garage Art) in 2012, created by Daniel Arellano Mesina and a group of young people who proposed the project to Andorra Televisió. The series also had the collaboration of an actor from Spanish series Física o Química, Àlex Batllori, who took the role of Álvaro in the Antena 3 series, and did the same in this project. One of the actors from Art de Garatge, Joel Pla, who played the role of Salvador, was hired by Andorra Televisió in 2013 to accompany the character of Club Piolet (children's program of Andorra Televisió) in his adventures One of the first children's programs was "Clic", a blue doll that gave way to an entire afternoon of cartoons, bought from Televisió de Catalunya. Decided on an evolutionary line, RTVA created the Club Piolet with its own magazine and its own membership club.

One of the greatest leaps made by Andorra Televisión in its development was its participation in the Eurovision Song Contest, since it entailed a whole logistical process that until that moment was not operational, or in any case, it gave the viewer a quality that had not been presented until then. Thus, on May 12, 2004, Catalan was played for the first time in the most important music competition in Europe. ATV participated in five more editions of the festival. Marta Roure, Marian Van de Wal, Jenny, the Anonymous, Gisela and Susanne Georgi defended the country in front of more than 400 million viewers in one of the most important television shows in the world. The first participation was possible thanks to the collaboration of Televisió de Catalunya, which with the program 12 Punts made available to the Catalan and Andorran public who would represent Andorra in the 2004 contest held in Istanbul. For budget and public deficit reasons, RTVA no longer participates in the festival since 2010.

On the other hand, the live broadcasts of the Games of the Small States of Europe also stand out. The last time Andorra hosted the competitions, Andorra Televisió made a sufficiently large deployment that also coincided with the Eurovision participations, thus confirming the step forward towards a higher logistical level. The web news portal informatius.ad was also a big change but was left aside to be replaced later by AndorraDifusió.ad in 2014. With this new web platform, the house's news for the first time incorporated direct that precisely they had the starting point with the visit of the Cycling Tour of Spain to Andorra.

In April 2014, Xavier Mujal, new director of Andorra Televisió, made public the intention to continue working in the potential of its news service. In declarations to Cadena Ser Principat d'Andorra he argumented that the news services of Andorra Televisió were the most seen in the country, which obliged more to potentiate this field.

From 1 July 2016, Andorra Televisió ceased broadcasting to the municipalities of the Catalan Pyrenees, limiting its coverage area to the Principality of Andorra. In fact, this television broadcast in Catalan territory in accordance with an agreement signed in 2010 but which expired in 2016. The television management decided not to renew it and save around 120,000 euros a year.

== Frequencies ==
Digital Frequencies

- Channel 42 UHF: Andorra
- Channel 61 UHF: Alt Urgell

== Logos and identities ==
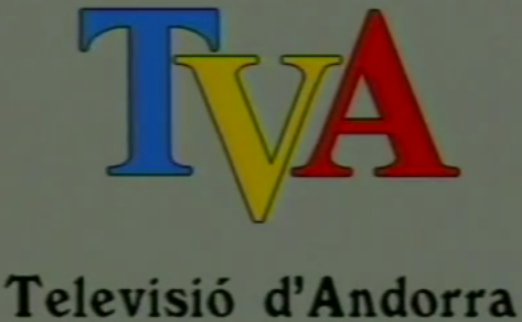
1991 to 1992

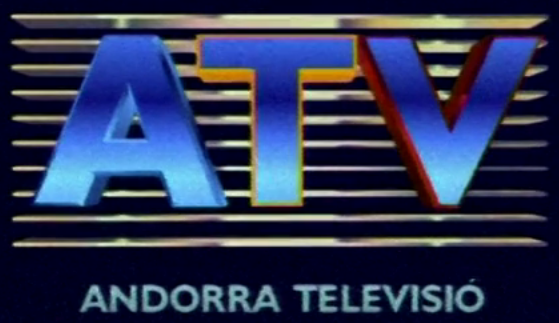
1995 to 1996

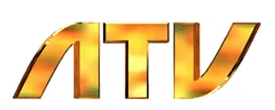
1996 to 2005

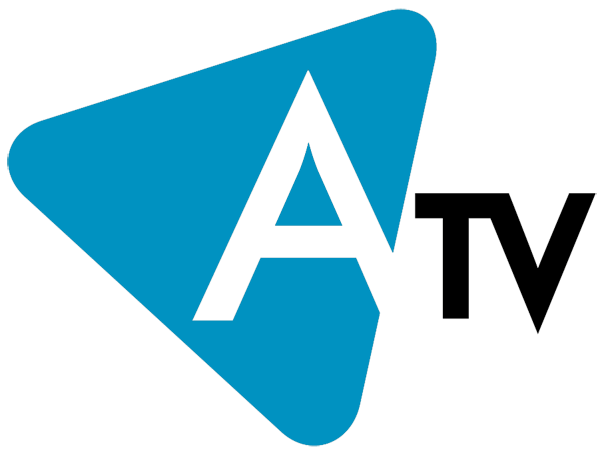
2005 to 2013

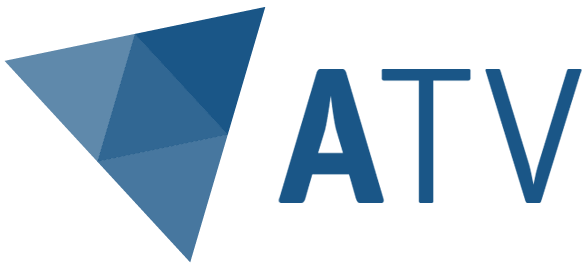
Since 2013
