= Radio and Television of Andorra =

Public television and radio broadcaster

Ràdio i Televisió d'Andorra, S.A.
- Type: Public television radio and Commercial Television
- Availability: National
- Headquarters: Andorra la Vella
- Key people: Juande Mellado (director-general)
- Launch date: 1989 (radio); 1995 (television)
- Former names: Organisme de Ràdio i Televisió d’Andorra (ORTA)
- Official website: rtva.ad Andorradifusio

Ràdio i Televisió d'Andorra, S.A. (Catalan pronunciation: [ˈraði.u j tələβiziˈo ðənˈdorə]; "Radio and Television of Andorra S.A."), shortened to RTVA, is the public television and radio broadcaster in the Principality of Andorra. It operates a television channel, Andorra Televisió (ATV), and two radio stations, Ràdio Nacional d'Andorra (RNA) and Andorra Música (AM), all of which broadcast in Catalan.

== History ==
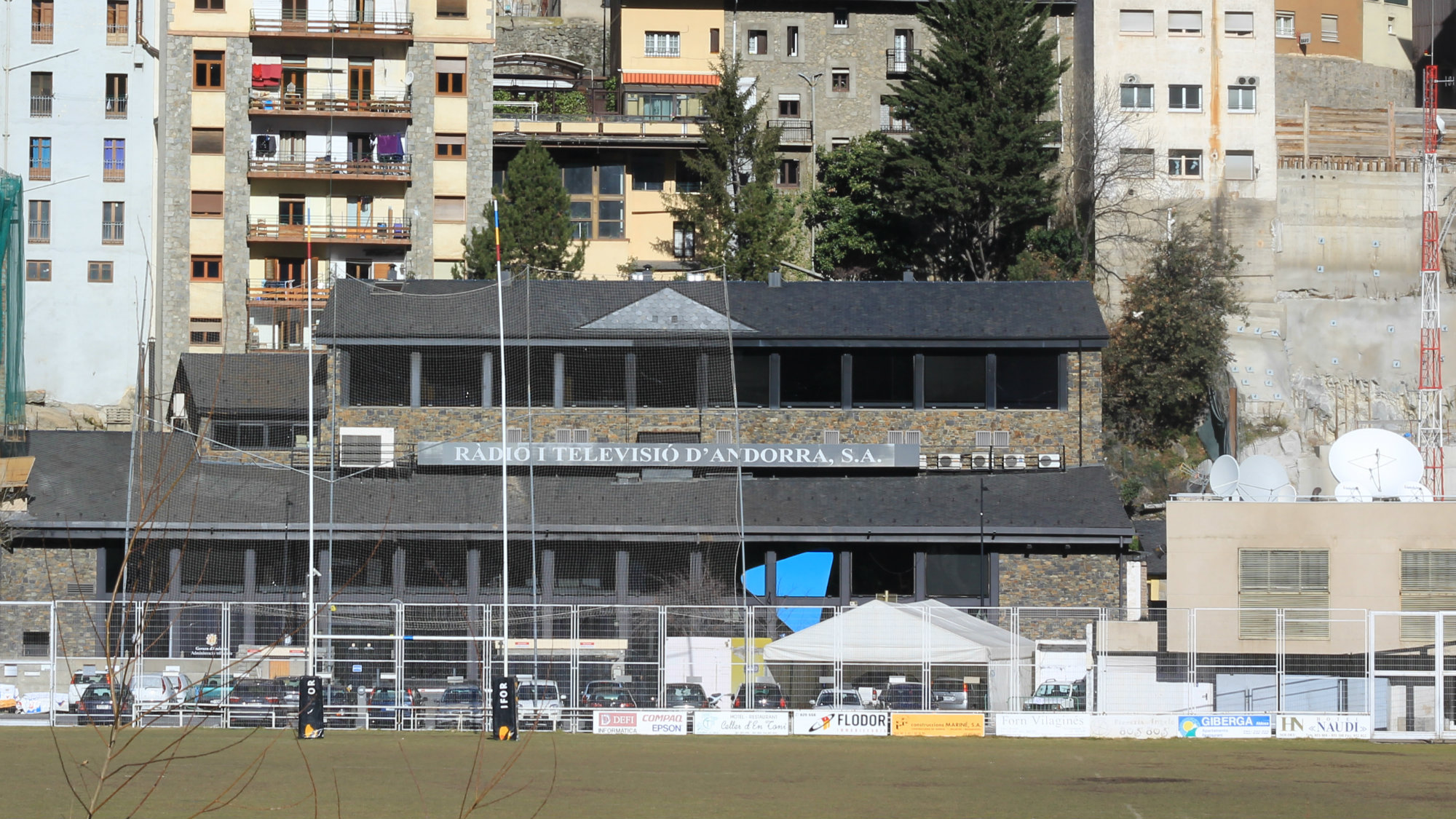
RTVA headquarters in Andorra la Vella (2013)

The first commercial radio station to broadcast from Andorra was Radio Andorra, which was active from 1939 to 1981. Public service broadcasting in the principality began on 26 October 1989 after the General Council of Andorra decided that a national broadcasting organisation should be set up.

As a result, the Organisme de Ràdio i Televisió d’Andorra (ORTA) was formed and radio station Ràdio Nacional d'Andorra (RNA) began broadcasting in December 1990. ORTA was funded by the Andorran government. Andorra Televisió (ATV), Andorra's first television channel began in 1995. All programming on both RNA and ATV was produced by independent companies until 1997 when ORTA began producing all of its own programming. ORTA was replaced by the current organisation, Ràdio i Televisió d'Andorra S.A. (RTVA), on 13 April 2000. RTVA took full control of both RNA and ATV. Like its predecessor, RTVA is also funded by the government. Advertising provides additional revenue. Its current director-general is Juande Mellado.

RTVA has been an active member of the European Broadcasting Union since 2002 and took part in the Eurovision Song Contest from 2004 to 2009 inclusive; however, in 2012 it was believed to be due to withdraw from the EBU because of financial problems.

The broadcaster has to compete with TV and radio stations from both France and Spain whose transmissions can easily be picked up in the principality.

== Services ==
=== Television ===
- ATV: The national television channel of Andorra.

=== Radio ===
- Ràdio Nacional d'Andorra (RNA): The national radio station of Andorra.
- Andorra Música (AM): Music radio station
RNA logo history

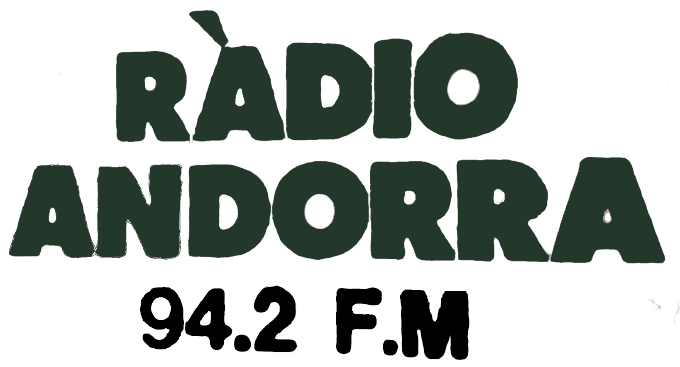
1990 to 1991

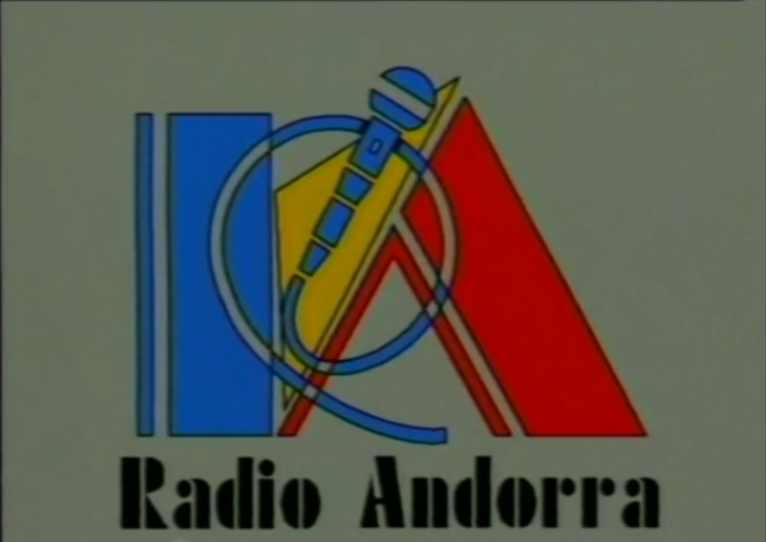
1991 to 1992

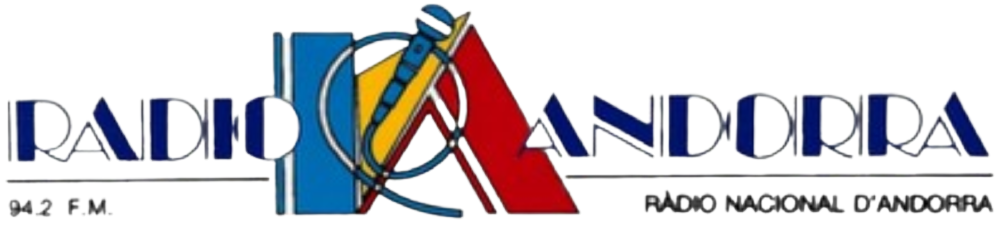
1991 to 1992

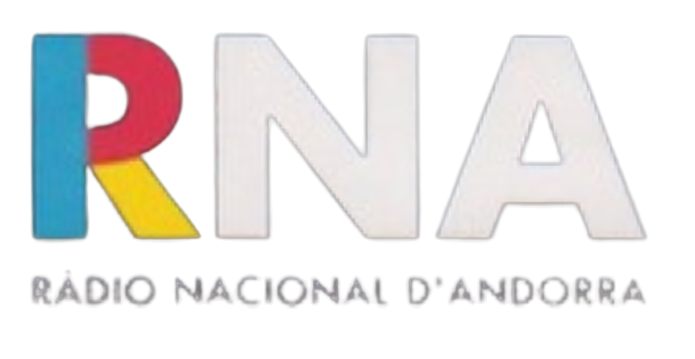
1993 to 1996

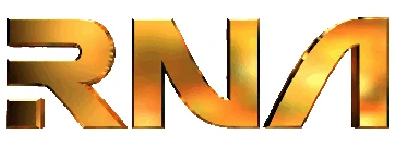
1996 to 2005

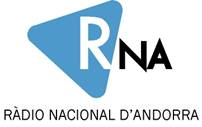
2005 to 2013

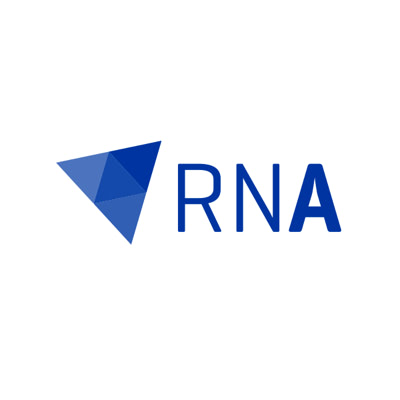
Since 2013

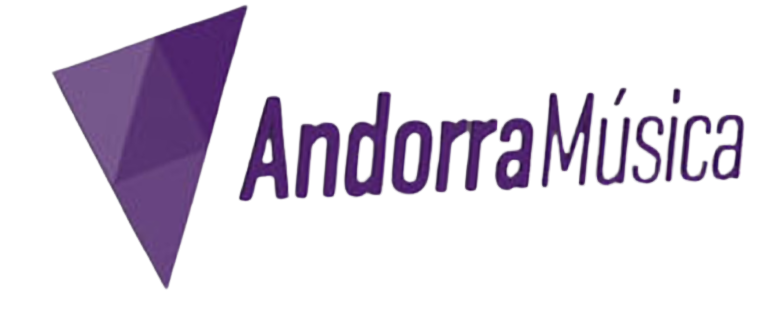
Andorra Música logo (2013)

=== Internet ===
Andorra Difusió logo

RTVA has had a web portal since November 2007. This was renewed in September 2013 to turn it into a multimedia service, under the name Andorra Difusió.

== Programming ==
ATV broadcasts a range of programming including sports, music, films and magazine shows as well as the daily children's strand Club Piolet. The flagship news programme ATV Noticies is produced and broadcast three times a day, with bulletins at 13:45, 21:00 and prior to closedown. Regular live parliamentary coverage is also broadcast. ATV usually broadcasts between the hours of 07:30 and 23:45 each day with information pages displayed after closedown.

RNA broadcasts mostly music although news bulletins air on the hour, every hour. The station broadcasts 24 hours a day, seven days a week.

ATV and RNA are streamed online for free on RTVA's website, although the ATV stream is sometimes replaced with a test card due to copyright restrictions on some programming.

== Logos and identities ==
Former RTVA logo (early 2000s)

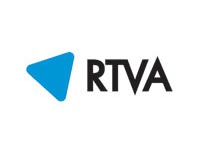
Logo used from 2005 to 2013
