= Operación Triunfo series 3 =

Operación Triunfo
- Series 3
- Hosted by: Carlos Lozano
- Judges: Pilar Tabares; Pilar Zamora; Inma Serrano; Narcís Rebollo
- Winner: Vicente Seguí
- Runner-up: Ramón del Castillo
- Location: Gestmusic studios Sant Just Desvern, (Barcelona)

Release
- Original network: La Primera
- Original release: 29 September – 21 December 2003

Series chronology
- ← Previous; Series 2 Next → Series 4

The third series of Operación Triunfo, also known as Operación Triunfo 3 or OT 3, was aired on La Primera of Televisión Española from 29 September 2003 to 21 December 2003, and was presented by Carlos Lozano.

Following its regular series, this second series was used to choose the Spanish performer and entry for the Eurovision Song Contest 2004. Vicente Seguí was the winner of the regular series, with Ramón winning the Eurovision selection with the song "Para llenarme de ti".

== Staff ==
- Academy headmaster: Nina
- Judges: Pilar Tabares, Pilar Zamora, Inma Serrano, and Narcís Rebollo
- Presenter: Carlos Lozano

== Contestants ==
Contestant	Age	Residence	Episode of eviction	Place finished
Vicente	24	Vilamarxant	Gala Final	Winner
Ramón	19	Gran Canaria	Gala Final	Runner-up
Miguel	22	Huelva	Gala Final	3rd
Davinia	18	Cádiz	Gala Final	4th
Mario	19	Zaragoza	Gala Final	5th
Leticia	26	Seville	Gala Final	6th
Noelia	18	Lugo	Gala 11	7th
Bea	18	Pontevedra	Gala 10	8th (Quit)
Nur	20	Barcelona	Gala 10	9th
Borja	19	Madrid	Gala 9	10th
Israel	23	Murcia	Gala 8	11th
Jorge	25	Zaragoza	Gala 7	12th
Sonia	29	Barcelona	Gala 6	13th
Miriam	22	Pontevedra	Gala 5	14th
José	25	Castellón de la Plana	Gala 4	15th
Fede	23	Madrid	Gala 3	16th
Isabel	20	Cádiz	Gala 2	17th

== Galas ==
In this edition, the jury only valued. Who really nominated was the public with their phone calls. The five least voted were in danger zone. One was saved by the jury, another by the Academy's staff, the third by the contestants and the other two were nominated all week, in the hands of the public.

=== Results summary ===
Colour key

–	The contestant was the weekly public's favourite and was exempt for nominations
–	The contestant was up for nomination but was saved by the jury
–	The contestant was up for nomination but was saved by the teachers
–	The contestant was up for nomination but was saved by the contestants
–	The contestant was nominated to leave the academy

	Gala 1	Gala 2	Gala 3	Gala 4	Gala 5	Gala 6	Gala 7	Gala 8	Gala 9	Gala 10	Gala 11	Final
Vicente	Favourite	Favourite	Favourite	Favourite	Favourite	Saved	Saved	Favourite	Saved	Saved; Mark: 8.65	Finalist	Winner
Ramón	Saved	Saved	Saved	Saved	Saved	Saved	Saved	Saved	Favourite	Saved; Mark: 9	Finalist	Runner-up
Miguel	Saved	Saved	Saved	Saved	Saved	Saved	Saved	Saved	Saved	Saved; Mark: 9.05	Finalist	3rd Place
Davinia	Saved	Saved	Saved	Saved	Saved	Saved	Saved	Saved	Saved	Saved; Mark: 9.35	Finalist	4th place
Mario	Saved	Saved	Saved	Saved	Saved	Saved	Saved	Saved	Saved	Nominated; Mark: 7.85	Finalist	5th place
Leticia	Saved	Saved	Saved	Saved	Saved	Saved	Favourite	Nominated	Saved	Saved; Mark: 8.7	Finalist	6th place
Noelia	Saved	Saved	Saved	Saved	Saved	Saved	Nominated	Saved	Nominated	Nominated; Mark: 7.55	Eliminated	
Bea	Saved	Saved	Saved	Saved	Saved	Favourite	Saved	Saved	Saved	Left competition		
Nur	Saved	Saved	Saved	Saved	Saved	Nominated	Saved	Saved	Nominated	Eliminated		
Borja	Saved	Saved	Saved	Saved	Saved	Saved	Saved	Nominated	Eliminated			
Israel	Saved	Saved	Saved	Saved	Nominated	Saved	Nominated	Eliminated				
Jorge	Saved	Nominated	Nominated	Saved	Saved	Nominated	Eliminated					
Sonia	Nominated	Saved	Saved	Nominated	Nominated	Eliminated						
Miriam	Saved	Saved	Saved	Nominated	Eliminated							
José	Saved	Saved	Nominated	Eliminated								
Fede	Saved	Nominated	Eliminated									
Isabel	Nominated	Eliminated										
Up for nomination	Isabel; Leticia; Miriam; Nur; Sonia	Israel; Jorge; Miriam; Sonia; Sonny	Davinia; Jorge; José; Nur; Sonia	Israel; Jorge; Miriam; Nur; Sonia	Borja; Israel; Leticia; Nur; Sonia	Israel; Jorge; Leticia; Mario; Nur	Borja; Israel; Miguel; Noelia; Nur	Borja; Leticia; Noelia; Nur; Ramón	Davinia; Leticia; Miguel; Noelia; Nur	Leticia; Mario; Noelia; Vicente	None	Vicente; 25.07% to win
Saved by jury	Leticia	Sonia	Nur	Israel	Leticia	Israel	Borja	Noelia	Leticia	None	None	Ramón; 24.33% to win
Saved by the teachers	Nur	Israel	Davinia	Jorge	Borja	Mario	Miguel	Ramón	Davinia	Leticia	None	Miguel; 16.39% to win
Saved by the contestants	Miriam; 6 of 14 votes to save	Miriam; 6 of 13 votes to save	Sonia; 7 of 12 votes to save	Nur; 9 of 11 votes to save	Nur; 5 of 10 votes to save	Leticia; 6 of 9 votes to save	Nur; 4 of 8 votes to save	Nur; 3 of 7 votes to save	Miguel; 5 of 6 votes to save	Vicente; 3 of 4 votes to save	None	Davinia; 12.71% to win
Saved by public vote	None	Sonia; 63.4% to save	Jorge; 57.25% to save	Jorge; 50.4% to save	Sonia; 53.7% to save	Israel; 70.3% to save	Nur; 58.85% to save	Noelia; 52.2% to save	Leticia; 57.15% to save	Noelia; 53.8% to save	Mario; 57.8% to save	Mario; 11.84% to win
Evicted	None	Isabel; 36.6% to save	Fede; 42.75% to save	José; 49.6% to save	Miriam; 46.3% to save	Sonia; 29.7% to save	Jorge; 41.15% to save	Israel; 47.8% to save	Borja; 42.85% to save	Nur; 46.2% to save	Noelia; 42.2% to save	Leticia; 9.66% to win
