= Son de Sol =

Spanish musical group

- Origin: Écija (Seville), Spain
- Members: Soledad León; Esperanza León; Lola León

Son de Sol (in English, Sound of the Sun) is a Spanish flamenco-pop band, made up of three sisters (Sole, Esperanza and Lola León) from Écija, Seville, Andalusia. The trio represented Spain in the Eurovision Song Contest 2005, which was held in Kyiv.

== Eurovision Song Contest 2005 ==
In the national pre-selection contest, broadcast by Televisión Española on the 4 and 5 March 2005, the group's song "Brujería" (Witchcraft) secured 24.2% of the vote, placing them ahead of the hot favourites Las Supremas de Móstoles by a margin of just 2.4%. The song was produced by Manuel Ruiz (aka Queco), who was also responsible for "The Ketchup Song (Aserejé)" by Las Ketchup, a massive international hit.

Son de Sol were one of fourteen entries with a bye directly into the grand final in Kyiv on 21 May, in which they also competed against ten qualifiers from the semi-final. The entry finished in the 21st position (out of 24), with 28 points.

== Music career ==
Son de Sol have not enjoyed commercial success in Spain. Their first album, De fiesta por sevillanas ranked at #3569 in the national Album Charts, having sold less than 100 copies. With Callejuela they climbed up to #1025. After this second unsuccessful chart result, their record company decided to drop them. In 2005, the group decided to release their 3rd album entitled Brujería with RTVE Records, with which their new company would send them to the Eurovision Song Contest. In 2008, Son de Sol released their 4th album entitled Directo a ti with Pias Records, without much resonance.

The sisters run a dance academy in their hometown of Écija.

== Discography (Albums) ==
- De fiesta por sevillanas (1999)
- Callejuela (2002)
- Brujería (April, 2005)
- Directo a ti (April, 2008)

Preceded by Ramón with "Para llenarme de ti"	Spain in the Eurovision Song Contest; 2005	Succeeded by Las Ketchup with "Un Blodymary"
