= Raúl Albiol =

Spanish footballer (born 1985)

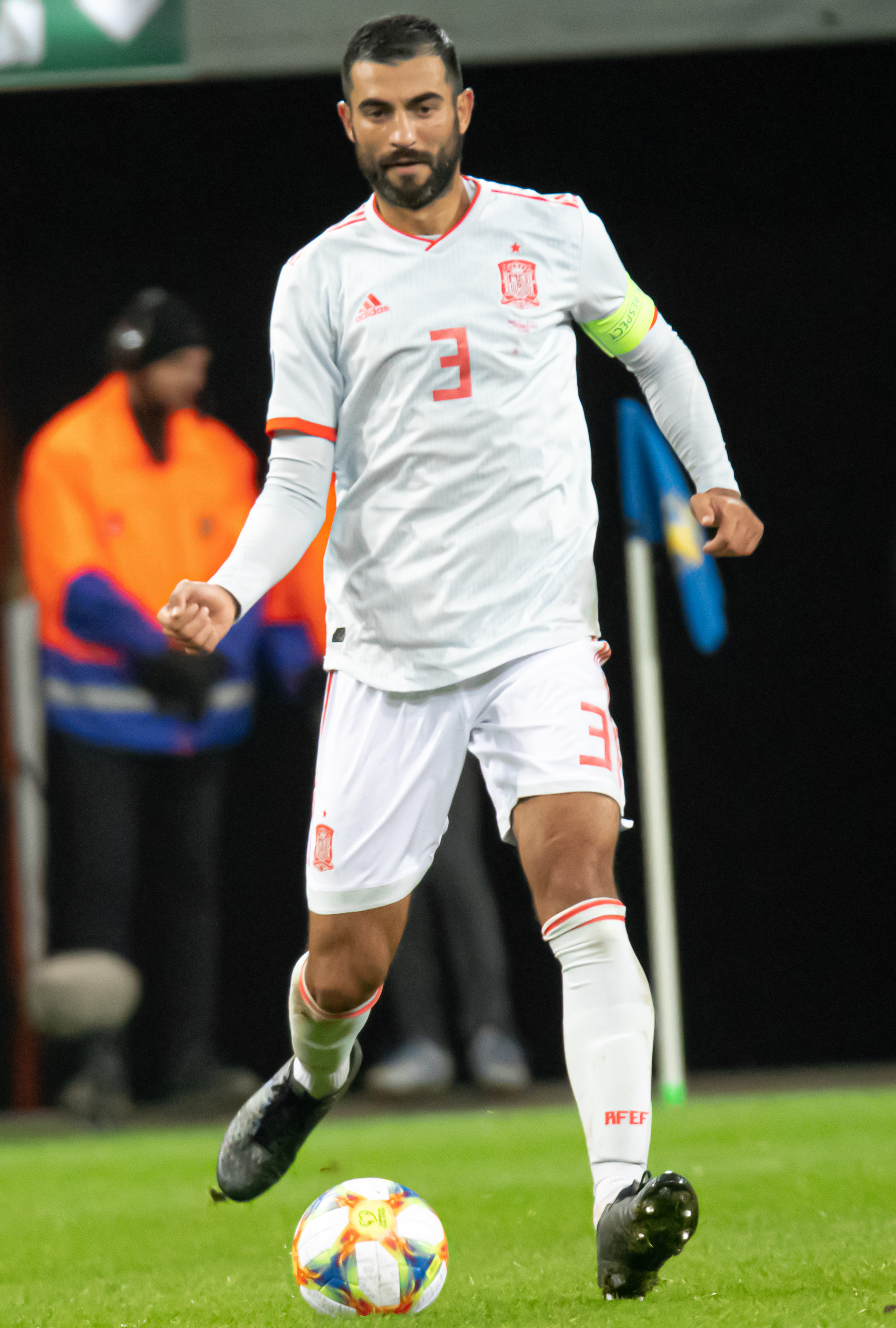
- Albiol playing for Spain in 2019

Personal information
- Full name: Raúl Albiol Tortajada
- Date of birth: 4 September 1985 (age 41)
- Place of birth: Vilamarxant, Spain
- Height: 1.90 m (6 ft 3 in)
- Position: Centre-back

Youth career
- 1994–1996: Ribarroja
- 1996–1997: Vilamarxant
- 1997–2003: Valencia

Senior career*
Years	Team	Apps	(Gls)
2003–2004	Valencia B	35	(2)
2004–2009	Valencia	131	(5)
2004–2005	→ Getafe (loan)	17	(1)
2009–2013	Real Madrid	81	(1)
2013–2019	Napoli	180	(6)
2019–2025	Villarreal	165	(1)
2025–2026	Pisa	8	(0)

International career
2004	Spain U19	7	(0)
2003–2005	Spain U20	4	(0)
2005–2006	Spain U21	7	(0)
2007–2021	Spain	58	(0)
Medal record
Representing Spain
FIFA World Cup
Winner	2010 South Africa
UEFA European Championship
Winner	2008 Austria–Switzerland
Winner	2012 Poland–Ukraine
- * Club domestic league appearances and goals as of 16:45, 22 March 2026 (UTC)

Raúl Albiol Tortajada (born 4 September 1985) is a Spanish professional footballer who plays as a central defender.

He spent most of his career with Valencia, Real Madrid and Villarreal, winning five major titles between the first two teams and the 2020–21 UEFA Europa League with the third. He amassed La Liga totals of 394 matches and eight goals over 16 seasons, and also played several years in Serie A with Napoli.

A Spain international since 2007, Albiol represented the country in two World Cups and as many European Championships, winning three tournaments including the 2010 World Cup.

== Club career ==
=== Valencia ===
Born in Vilamarxant, Valencian Community, Albiol started playing football with two modest clubs in his native region, moving to local giants Valencia before celebrating his 10th birthday. He made his first-team debut on 24 September 2003 in a UEFA Cup first-round tie against AIK at 18 years and 20 days, but spent the first year still registered with the reserves.

In August 2004, whilst travelling to sign a deal to join Getafe on loan, Albiol was involved in a serious car accident, being put in intensive care. He managed to recover completely and, after reappearing in January, played an important role in the team surviving the relegation battle. He made his La Liga debut on 15 January 2005 in a 1–1 home draw with Atlético Madrid, and scored against another side from the capital, Real Madrid, in a 2–1 home win two months later.

Albiol returned to the Mestalla Stadium the following season, and quickly established himself as first-choice due to his versatility. In the opening game of 2006–07, he scored the winner against Real Betis in a 2–1 home victory. He also scored from long distance against Olympiacos on 12 September 2006 in the group stage of the UEFA Champions League, which Valencia won 4–2 away.

During his four-season spell with the first team, Albiol played at least 29 league games, and he helped to victory in the 2007–08 edition of the Copa del Rey.

=== Real Madrid ===
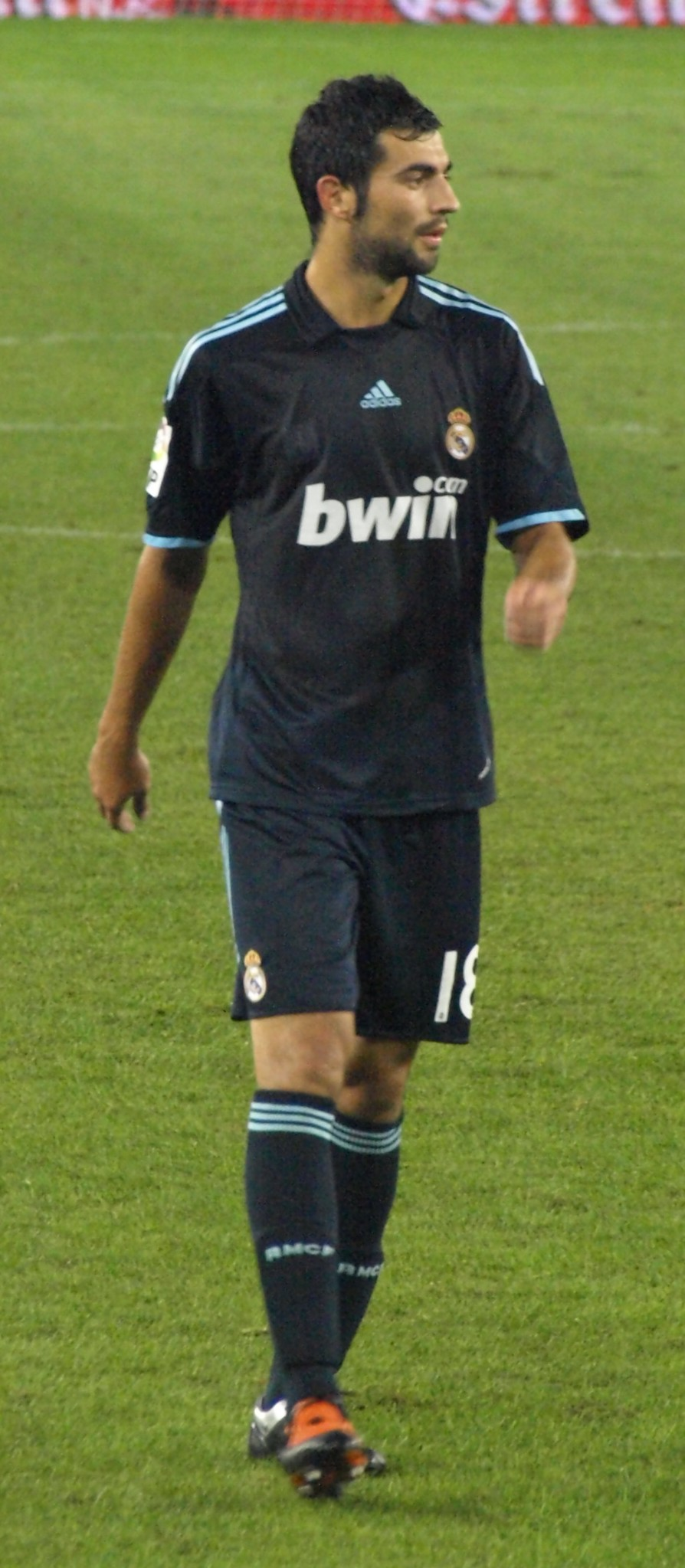
Albiol playing for Real Madrid in 2009

On 25 June 2009, Albiol joined Real Madrid for a fee thought to be in the region of €15 million, becoming the first Spanish player signed by Florentino Pérez upon his return to the presidency. He scored his first goal on 8 December in a 3–1 Champions League win away to Marseille. He was an undisputed starter during the league campaign, mainly due to Pepe's serious knee injury.

In the 2010–11 season, Albiol was relegated to the bench as Real brought in another player for his position, Ricardo Carvalho, only appearing in the league through injury or suspension to teammates; he did start, however, in the club's domestic cup run. On 26 January 2011, in the semi-final first leg against Sevilla (1–0 away victory), he cleared a Luís Fabiano shot just before it crossed the goal line. On 16 April, he was sent off for fouling former Valencia teammate David Villa inside the penalty area during El Clásico with Barcelona, which resulted in the first goal in a 1–1 league home draw.

On 6 August 2012, Albiol renewed his contract until June 2017. On 27 November, in his first appearance as captain, at home against Alcoyano in the Spanish Cup, he had to be stretchered off after only one minute, being sidelined for approximately one month with an ankle injury.

=== Napoli ===
On 21 July 2013, Albiol joined Napoli for a reported €12 million, signing a four-year contract. He made his Serie A debut on 25 August, in a 3–0 home win over Bologna.

Albiol scored his first goal for the Rafael Benítez-led team on 25 January 2014, with an 88th-minute equaliser in a 1–1 home draw against ChievoVerona. On 3 May, he played the entire final of the Coppa Italia, helping to a 3–1 defeat of Fiorentina.

=== Villarreal ===
On 4 July 2019, the 33-year-old Albiol returned to Spain after agreeing to a three-year deal with Villarreal. He made his debut on 17 August, in a 4–4 home draw with Granada.

Albiol scored twice from 11 appearances in the 2020–21 UEFA Europa League, as the club won the first major honour of its 98-year history. In the 2021 UEFA Super Cup against Chelsea, he missed the decisive penalty in the shoot-out.

On 12 April 2022, Albiol was named player of the match in a 1–1 away draw against Bayern Munich in the Champions League quarter-finals second leg, securing Villarreal's qualification by winning 2–1 on aggregate. In May 2025, four months shy of his 40th birthday, he left the La Cerámica Stadium.

=== Pisa ===
Albiol returned to Italy and its top tier in September 2025, joining newly-promoted Pisa as a free agent.

== International career ==
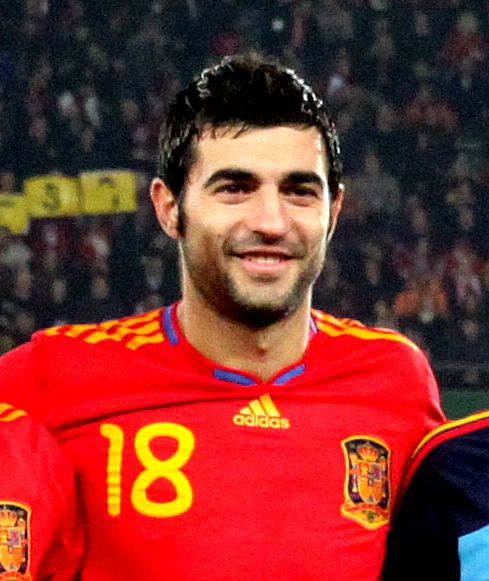
Albiol lining up for Spain in 2009

Having represented Spain at under-21 level, Albiol made his debut for the senior squad on 13 October 2007 in an UEFA Euro 2008 qualifier against Denmark, a 3–1 away win. In the final stages, he appeared twice for the eventual champions, against Sweden (subbing in for the injured Carles Puyol) and Greece.

New national team coach Vicente del Bosque included Albiol in the squad for the 2009 FIFA Confederations Cup in South Africa. He started in Spain's first game, partnering Puyol in central defence ahead of Valencia teammate Carlos Marchena and helping defeat New Zealand 5–0.

Albiol was picked for the 2010 FIFA World Cup, but did not leave the bench for the eventual champions after having suffered an injury in training. Again as an unused player, he was also in the squad for the Euro 2012 tournament in Poland and Ukraine, which also ended in victory.

Albiol was named in Spain's 23-man squad for the 2014 World Cup. He made his debut in a major finals in the last group match against Australia with the Spanish already eliminated, playing the whole 90 minutes alongside Sergio Ramos in central defence in a 3–0 victory.

On 11 October 2018, after taking part in the 4–1 friendly away victory over Wales, Albiol appeared in his 52nd international to become the most-capped player from his region of birth, surpassing David Albelda. He went on to total 58 appearances.

== Style of play ==
A physically strong player who excels in the air, Albiol's main asset is his versatility, as he can play as a centre-back, right-back or defensive midfielder.

== Personal life ==
Albiol's nickname is "El Chori". His older brother Miguel was also a footballer, while his father, also named Miguel, appeared in the Segunda División for Sabadell. The youngest sibling, Brian, was named after Brian Laudrup, whom Raúl admired on account of his success with the Denmark national team.

Albiol fathered two daughters with his wife Alicia. In 2008, with Guillermo Franco and Marcos Senna, he founded Evangélico FC, an organisation consisting of 140 athletes and 16 coaches which sought to promote Christian values among young athletes in Spain.

== Career statistics ==
=== Club ===
As of match played 22 March 2026

Appearances and goals by club, season and competition
Club	Season	League			National cup (Note: Includes Copa del Rey, Coppa Italia)		Europe		Other		Total	
Club	Season	Division	Apps	Goals	Apps	Goals	Apps	Goals	Apps	Goals	Apps	Goals
Valencia B	2003–04	Segunda División B	35	2	—		—		—		35	2
Valencia	2003–04	La Liga	0	0	—		2 (Note: Appearances in UEFA Cup)	0	—		2	0
Valencia	2005–06	La Liga	29	1	4	0	3 (Note: Appearances in UEFA Intertoto Cup)	0	—		36	1
Valencia	2006–07	La Liga	36	1	4	2	12 (Note: Appearances in UEFA Champions League)	1	—		52	4
Valencia	2007–08	La Liga	32	1	6	0	7	0	—		45	1
Valencia	2008–09	La Liga	34	2	2	0	6	0	2 (Note: Appearances in Supercopa de España)	0	44	2
Valencia	Total		131	5	16	2	30	1	2	0	179	8
Getafe (loan)	2004–05	La Liga	17	1	2	0	—		—		19	1
Real Madrid	2009–10	La Liga	33	0	2	0	8	1	—		43	1
Real Madrid	2010–11	La Liga	20	0	6	0	6	0	—		32	0
Real Madrid	2011–12	La Liga	10	0	2	0	5	0	0	0	17	0
Real Madrid	2012–13	La Liga	18	1	5	0	3	0	1	0	27	1
Real Madrid	Total		81	1	15	0	22	1	1	0	119	2
Napoli	2013–14	Serie A	32	1	5	0	9 (Note: Six appearances in UEFA Champions League, three appearances in UEFA Europa League)	0	—		46	1
Napoli	2014–15	Serie A	35	0	3	0	12 (Note: Two appearances in UEFA Champions League, ten appearances in UEFA Europa League)	0	1 (Note: Appearance in Supercoppa Italiana)	0	51	0
Napoli	2015–16	Serie A	36	1	0	0	3 (Note: Appearances in UEFA Europa League)	0	—		39	1
Napoli	2016–17	Serie A	26	0	3	0	6	0	—		35	0
Napoli	2017–18	Serie A	31	3	0	0	8 (Note: Seven appearances in UEFA Champions League, one appearance in UEFA Europa League)	0	—		39	3
Napoli	2018–19	Serie A	20	1	0	0	6	0	—		26	1
Napoli	Total		180	6	11	0	44	0	1	0	236	6
Villarreal	2019–20	La Liga	36	1	2	0	—		—		38	1
Villarreal	2020–21	La Liga	35	0	1	0	11	2	—		47	2
Villarreal	2021–22	La Liga	28	0	2	1	12	0	1 (Note: Appearance in UEFA Super Cup)	0	43	1
Villarreal	2022–23	La Liga	25	0	1	0	1 (Note: Appearance in UEFA Europa Conference League)	0	—		27	0
Villarreal	2023–24	La Liga	26	0	1	0	3	0	—		30	0
Villarreal	2024–25	La Liga	15	0	1	0	—		—		16	0
Villarreal	Total		165	1	8	1	27	2	1	0	201	4
Pisa	2025–26	Serie A	8	0	1	0	—		—		9	0
Career total			617	16	53	3	123	4	5	0	798	23

=== International ===
Appearances and goals by national team and year
National team	Year	Apps	Goals
Spain	2007	2	0
Spain	2008	8	0
Spain	2009	11	0
Spain	2010	2	0
Spain	2011	8	0
Spain	2012	7	0
Spain	2013	6	0
Spain	2014	6	0
Spain	2015	1	0
Spain	2018	1	0
Spain	2019	4	0
Spain	2021	2	0
Total		58	0

== Honours ==
Valencia

- Copa del Rey: 2007–08
- UEFA Cup: 2003–04

Real Madrid

- La Liga: 2011–12
- Copa del Rey: 2010–11; runner-up: 2012–13
- Supercopa de España: 2012

Napoli

- Coppa Italia: 2013–14
- Supercoppa Italiana: 2014

Villarreal

- UEFA Europa League: 2020–21

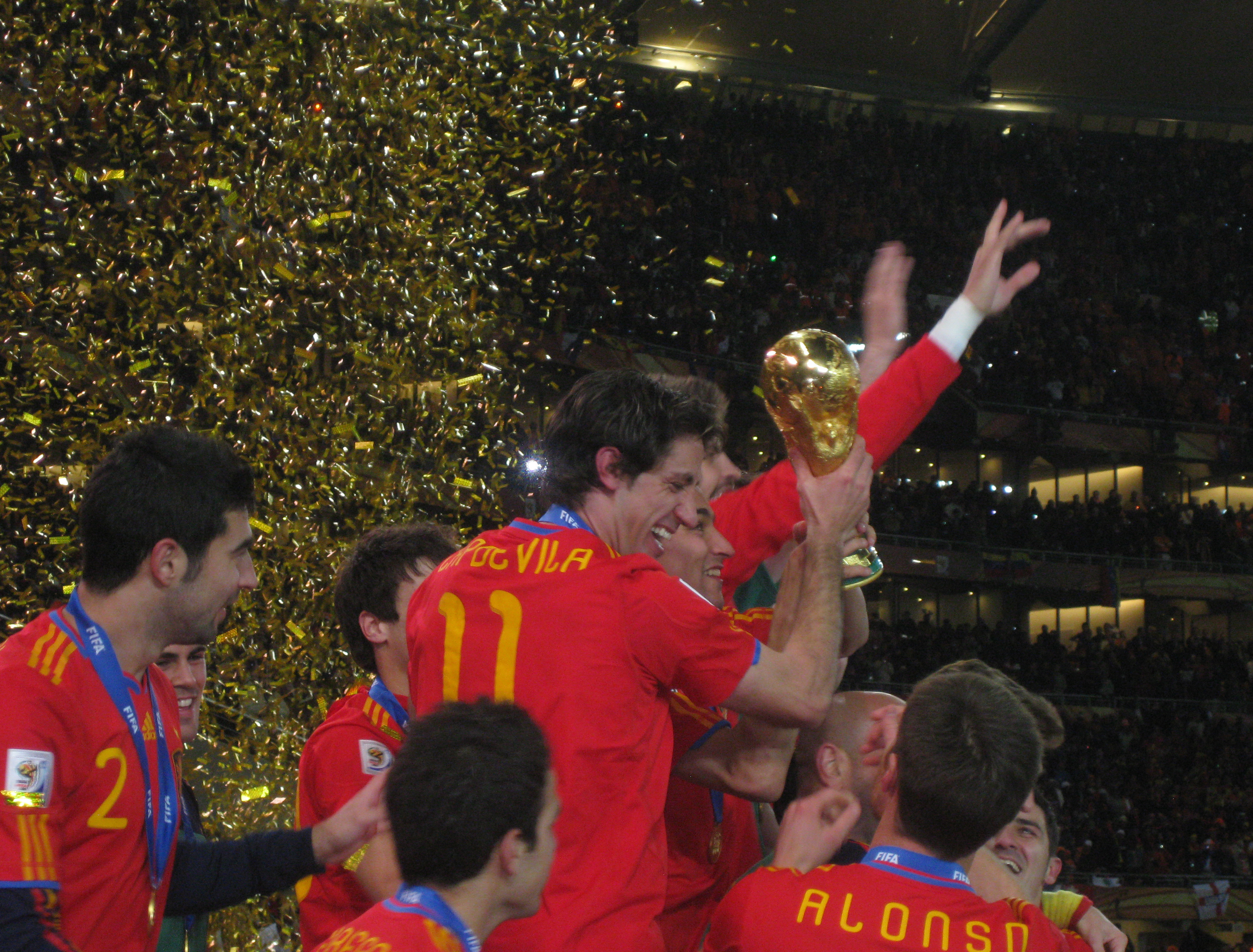
Albiol (number 2) celebrating Spain's win in the 2010 FIFA World Cup Final

Spain U19

- UEFA European Under-19 Championship: 2004

Spain

- FIFA World Cup: 2010
- UEFA European Championship: 2008, 2012
- FIFA Confederations Cup runner-up: 2013; third place 2009

Individual

- La Liga Breakthrough Player of the Year: 2006
- UEFA Europa League Squad of the Season: 2014–15, 2020–21
