= Las Ketchup =

Spanish pop band

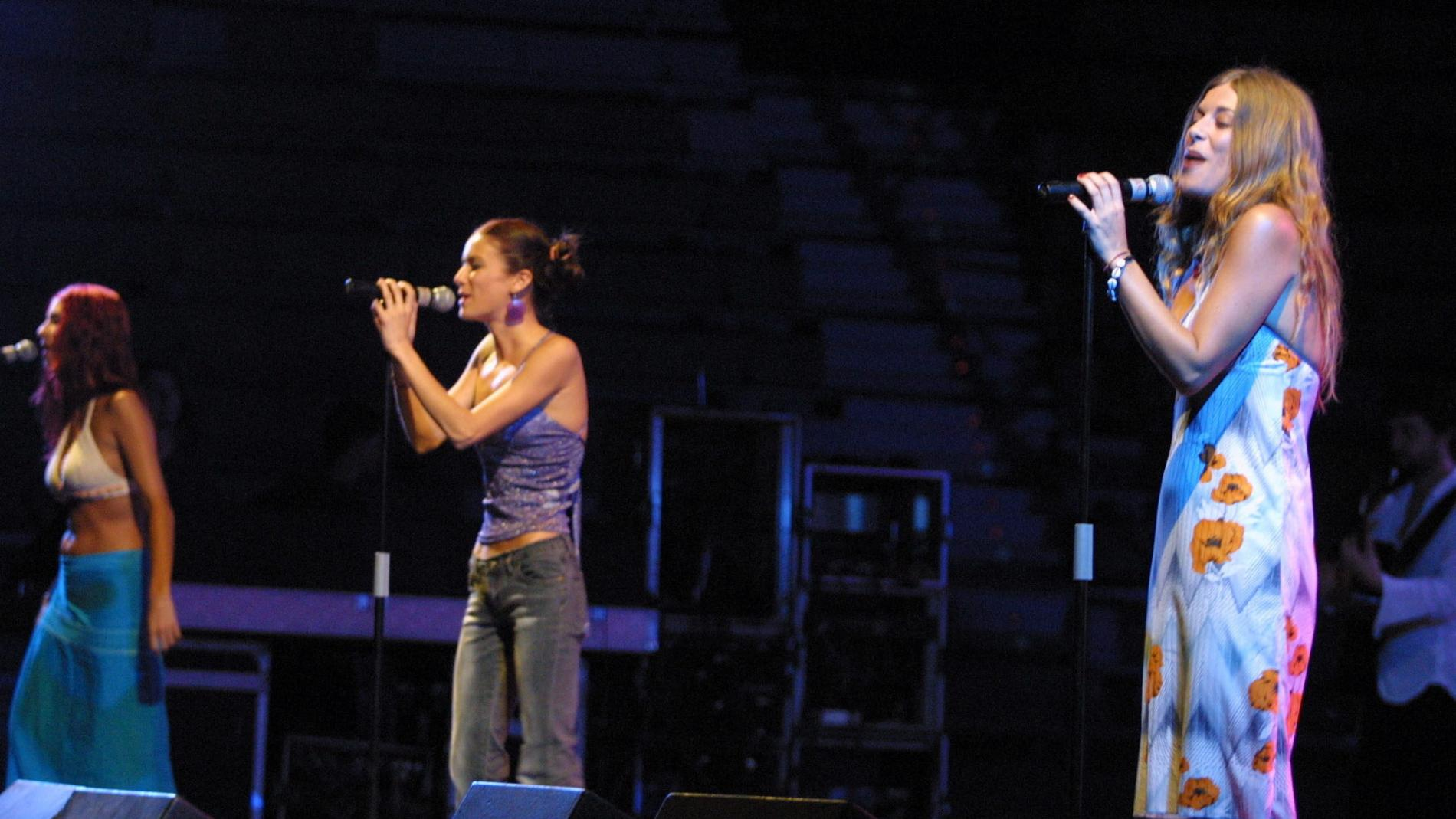
- Las Ketchup in 2003; L–R: Lola, Lucía and Pilar

Background information
- Origin: Córdoba, Andalusia, Spain
- Genres: Pop; Latin pop
- Years active: 2001–2006; 2016; 2018–present
- Labels: Altra Moda; Sony
- Members: Lucía Muñoz; Lola Muñoz; Pilar Muñoz
- Past members: Rocío Muñoz
- Website: www.lasketchup.es

Las Ketchup is a Spanish girl group best known for their 2002 hit single "The Ketchup Song (Aserejé)", which sold over seven million copies worldwide. Founded by flamenco record producer Manuel "Queco" Ruiz, the group consists of sisters Lucía, Lola, and Pilar Muñoz (for a time joined by a fourth sister Rocío). The group's debut studio album, Hijas del Tomate, has sold over two million copies worldwide.

They represented Spain at the Eurovision Song Contest 2006 in Athens with the song "Un Blodymary". The group has not released any singles since 2006, but still performs together publicly around Spain and other countries.

== History ==
=== 2001–2002: Formation ===
All members of the group are daughters of flamenco musician Juan Manuel Muñoz Expósito, best known by his stage name, El Tomate (Spanish for "The Tomato"). Naming the group after tomato ketchup was a tribute to their father.

Las Ketchup was originally discovered by the flamenco record producer Manuel "Queco" Ruiz, who signed them to his newly formed, independent Córdoba label Shaketown Music, that he ran together with Manuel Illán.

=== 2002–2005: Hijas del Tomate ===
In the middle of 2002, they had a major flamenco Europop fusion hit with "Aserejé" (released as "The Ketchup Song" in the United States, the United Kingdom and other countries), which reached the top of the charts in many countries, including: Spain, Portugal, Colombia, the United Kingdom, Italy, Japan, Albania, France, Finland, Turkey, Syria, Sweden, Norway, Belgium, the Netherlands, the Philippines, Switzerland, Germany, Romania, Canada and Australia. However, it failed to hit the top 40 on the U.S. Billboard Hot 100. The title and part of the lyrics were in Spanish. The hit also had an accompanying dance. The second single was "Kusha Las Payas" and garnered moderate success. The group re-released "The Ketchup Song" later in the same year, with a new video, as a Christmas song.

=== 2006: Un Blodymary and addition of Rocío ===
The group took an extended absence from the public eye to write songs for a new album and, during the same period, Pilar had a baby. In 2006, they were joined by Rocío, a fourth sister, and came back as a four girl group to represent Spain in the Eurovision Song Contest 2006. The girls said themselves that Rocío had always been a member of "Las Ketchup", but that had not appeared in the promo material or performances because she was pregnant. They released their second studio album, titled Un Blodymary. The album release was delayed until the beginning of 2006. They planned to release one million copies and their record producer Queco, who also produced and wrote their worldwide single, "Aserejé", indicated that the album displayed their original sound. Their first single from the album was also titled "Un Blodymary" for the Spanish entry in the Eurovision Song Contest 2006. The song finished twenty-first with only 18 points.

=== 2016–2017 ===
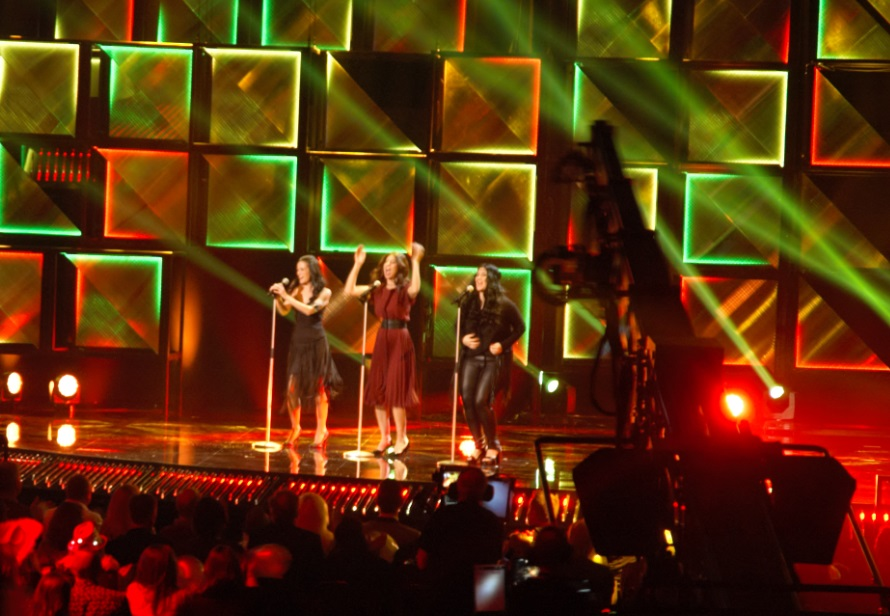
Las Ketchup at Melodifestivalen in 2016

In 2016, the group performed their hit "The Ketchup Song (Aserejé)" as an interval during the first semi-final of the Swedish pre-selection to the Eurovision Song Contest, Melodifestivalen. In 2017, they performed at the Pal Norte in Monterrey, Mexico.

== Discography ==
=== Studio albums ===
Title	Details	Peak chart positions									Certifications
Title	Details	AUT	DEN	FIN	FRA	GER	NL	NOR	SWE	SUI	Certifications
Hijas del Tomate	Released: 30 July 2002; Label: Altra Moda, Columbia, Sony; Format: CD, cassette	22	27	1	18	20	23	13	7	6	SNEP: Gold
Un Blodymary	Released: 2006; Label: Altra Moda, Columbia, Sony; Formats: CD, digital download	—	—	—	—	—	—	—	—	—	
"—" denotes a recording that did not chart or was not released in that territory.

=== Singles ===
==== As lead artist ====
List of singles, with selected chart positions and certifications, showing year released and album name
Title	Year	Peak chart positions										Certifications	Album
Title	Year	ESP	AUS	AUT	FRA	GER	NOR	SWE	SUI	UK	US	Certifications	Album
"The Ketchup Song (Aserejé)"	2002	1	1	1	1	1	1	1	1	1	54	ARIA: 3× Platinum; BPI: Platinum; BVMI: 2× Platinum; IFPI AUT: 2× Platinum; IFPI NOR: 6× Platinum; IFPI SWE: 4× Platinum; IFPI SWI: 3× Platinum; SNEP: Diamond	Hijas del Tomate
"Kusha Las Payas"	2002	12	—	36	38	76	—	—	29	—	—		Hijas del Tomate
"Un Blodymary"	2006	7	—	—	—	—	—	38	82	—	—		Un Blodymary
"—" denotes a recording that did not chart or was not released in that territory.

==== As featured artist ====
List of singles, with selected chart positions and certifications, showing year released and album name
Title	Year	Peak chart positions	Album
Title	Year	BRA	Album
"Ragatanga" (Rouge featuring Las Ketchup)	2002	1	Rouge

== Awards ==
- 2002 Ondas Awards

– Best New Artist/Group

- 2004 Billboard Latin Music Awards

– Best Pop Album from the New Generation (Hijas del Tomate)

– Most Played Tropical-Salsa Song by a Duo or Group ("The Ketchup Song (Aserejé)")

- 2003 Latin Grammy Award

– Best Pop Album By a Duo or Group with Vocals Hijas del Tomate (Nominated, lost to Bacilos's Caraluna.)

- 2003 MIDEM (Cannes)

– Best New Artist/Group

- 2003 Amigo Awards

– Best New Group

– Best New Artist

- 2004 MIDEM (Cannes)

– Border Breakers (Best-selling album out of its country and within Europe with Hijas del Tomate)

== Parodies ==
In 2002, the German comedian Elmar Brandt wrote (using the tune of Aserejé) a Gerhard Schröder parody called "Der Steuersong" (The Tax Song) for the radio program The Gerd Show.

In 2002, a satirical version to the tune of Aserejé by El Grupo Mayonesa circulated in Gibraltar prior to the referendum on a proposal of joint sovereignty, entitled 'Vota Que No, Que No, Que No No No'

In 2003, the Slovak fictional musical duo Krímeš performed in TV show Uragán a satirical version to the tune of Aserejé called "Sereme" (We're Shitting).

== See also ==
- Son de Sol

Preceded by Son de Sol with "Brujería"	Spain in the Eurovision Song Contest; 2006	Succeeded by D'NASH with "I Love You Mi Vida"
