= Spain in the Eurovision Song Contest 2004 =

- Eurovision Song Contest 2004
- Participating broadcaster: Televisión Española (TVE)
- Country: Spain
- Selection process: Operación Triunfo 3: Gala Eurovisión
- Selection date: 28 January 2004

Competing entry
- Song: "Para llenarme de ti"
- Artist: Ramón
- Songwriters: Kike Santander

Placement
- Final result: 10th, 87 points

Participation chronology

Spain was represented at the Eurovision Song Contest 2004 with the song "Para llenarme de ti", written by Kike Santander, and performed by Ramón. The Spanish participating broadcaster, Televisión Española (TVE), selected its entry through the third series of the reality television music competition Operación Triunfo. Four artists and songs ultimately qualified to compete in the final of the competition's Eurovision selection show where a public televote exclusively selected "Para llenarme de ti" performed by Ramón as the winner, receiving 38.8% of the votes.

As a member of the "Big Four", Spain automatically qualified to compete in the final of the Eurovision Song Contest. Performing as the opening entry for the show in position 1, Spain placed tenth out of the 24 participating countries with 87 points.

== Background ==
Prior to the 2004 contest, Televisión Española (TVE) had participated in the Eurovision Song Contest representing Spain forty-three times since its first entry in 1961. It has won the contest on two occasions: in 1968 with the song "La, la, la" performed by Massiel and in 1969 with the song "Vivo cantando" performed by Salomé, the latter having won in a four-way tie with France, the Netherlands, and the United Kingdom. It has also finished second four times, with "En un mundo nuevo" by Karina in 1971, "Eres tú" by Mocedades in 1973, "Su canción" by Betty Missiego in 1979, and "Vuelve conmigo" by Anabel Conde in 1995. In 2003, it placed eighth with the song "Dime" performed by Beth.

As part of its duties as participating broadcaster, TVE organises the selection of its entry in the Eurovision Song Contest and broadcasts the event in the country. In 2002 and 2003, TVE used the reality television singing competition Operación Triunfo (the Spanish version of Star Academy) to select both the artist and song that would represent Spain. The procedure was continued in order to select their 2004 entry.

== Before Eurovision ==
=== Operación Triunfo 3 ===
The Spanish entry for the Eurovision Song Contest 2004 was selected through Operación Triunfo, a Spanish reality television music competition consisting of training seventeen contestants in a boarding academy in order to find new singing talent. The third series, also known as Operación Triunfo 3, took place from 29 September 2003 to 21 December 2003 at the Mediapark Studios in Sant Just Desvern (Barcelona), hosted by Carlos Lozano. The competition was broadcast on La Primera and TVE Internacional. The top three contestants (Vicente, Ramón and Miguel) alongside a wildcard (Davinia) selected during a special show which featured the contestants placed fourth to ninth qualified to compete in the Eurovision selection show, Gala Eurovisión, which consisted of three shows on 14, 21 and 28 January 2004. Each contestant performed three candidate songs and the winner was decided exclusively through a public televote. The competing songs and the allocations were announced on 8 January 2004.

Contestant qualified to "Gala Eurovisión"

Contestant	Age	Residence	Episode of elimination	Place finished (Overall ranking)
Vicente	24	Villamarxant	Gala Final	1st
Ramón	19	Gran Canaria	Gala Final	2nd
Miguel	22	Huelva	Gala Final	3rd
Davinia	18	Cádiz	Gala Final	4th
Mario	19	Zaragoza	Gala Final	5th
Leticia	26	Seville	Gala Final	6th
Noelia	18	Lugo	Gala 11	7th
Beatriz	18	Pontevedra	Gala 10	8th
Nur	20	Barcelona	Gala 10	9th
Borja	19	Madrid	Gala 9	10th
Israel	23	Murcia	Gala 8	11th
Jorge	25	Zaragoza	Gala 7	12th
Sonia	29	Barcelona	Gala 6	13th
Miriam	22	Pontevedra	Gala 5	14th
José	25	Castellón de la Plana	Gala 4	15th
Fede	23	Madrid	Gala 3	16th
Isabel	20	Cádiz	Gala 2	17th

==== Song selection ====
The song selection round of Gala Eurovisión consisted of two rounds of voting. In the first round which took place on 14 January 2004, an in-studio jury eliminated one song per contestant. The five members of the in-studio jury were Anabel Conde (singer, represented Spain in 1995), David Civera (singer, represented Spain in 2001), Inma Serrano (singer-songwriter and producer), Daniel Andrea (singer and producer) and Carles Savall (journalist at El Periódico de Catalunya). In the second round which took place on 21 January 2004, a public televote eliminated an additional song per contestant. In addition to the performances of the competing entries, the guest performer in the second show was Sertab Erener, who won Eurovision for Turkey in 2003.

First Round – 14 January 2004
R/O	Artist	Song	Songwriter(s)	Result
1	Davinia	"Quiero tu amor"	Toni Ten; Xasqui Ten	Advanced
2	Miguel	"Hoy te quiero más"	David Augustabe; Francisco Ponferrada; Bruno Nicolás	—N/a
3	Ramón	"Para llenarme de ti"	Kike Santander	Advanced
4	Vicente	"Veinte años más"	Alejandro Abad	Advanced
5	Miguel	"Amor de madrugada"	David Augustabe; Francisco Ponferrada; Bruno Nicolás	Advanced
6	Vicente	"Se me va la vida"	Alejandro Abad	Advanced
7	Ramón	"Cuestión de alma"	David Santisteban	—N/a
8	Davinia	"Cómo quieres que te quiera"	Daniel Ambrojo	Advanced
9	Vicente	"Nadie como tú"	Alejandro Abad	—N/a
10	Davinia	"Mi obsesión"	Daniel Ambrojo	—N/a
11	Miguel	"Muéveme"	Pablo Torres; Manuel Tomás	Advanced
12	Ramón	"Todo vuelve a importar"	Alejandro Piqueras; Fernando Rodríguez	Advanced

Second Round – 21 January 2004 – Miguel
R/O	Song	Televote	Place	Result
1	"Amor de madrugada"	21.4%	2	—N/a
5	"Muéveme"	78.6%	1	Qualified

Second Round – 21 January 2004 – Ramón
R/O	Song	Televote	Place	Result
2	"Para llenarme de ti"	70.7%	1	Qualified
6	"Todo vuelve a importar"	29.3%	2	—N/a

Second Round – 21 January 2004 – Vicente
R/O	Song	Televote	Place	Result
3	"Veinte años más"	16.0%	2	—N/a
7	"Se me va la vida"	84.0%	1	Qualified

Second Round – 21 January 2004 – Davinia
R/O	Song	Televote	Place	Result
4	"Cómo quieres que te quiera"	85.7%	1	Qualified
8	"Quiero tu amor"	14.3%	2	—N/a

==== Final ====
The final of Gala Eurovisión took place on 28 January 2004. The winner, "Para llenarme de ti" performed by Ramón, was selected exclusively through a public televote which ran between 21 and 28 February 2004. In addition to the performances of the competing entries, guest performers included former Operación Triunfo contestants Cristie Sánchez, Danni Úbeda, David Bustamante, Geno Machado, Gisela, Javián, Manuel Carrasco, Marey, Tessa Bodí and former Junior Eurovision contestant Sergio who represented Spain in 2003.

Final – 28 January 2004
R/O	Artist	Song	Televote	Place
1	Davinia	"Cómo quieres que te quiera"	15.4%	4
2	Miguel	"Muéveme"	16.5%	3
3	Ramón	"Para llenarme de ti"	38.8%	1
4	Vicente	"Se me va la vida"	29.3%	2

== At Eurovision ==
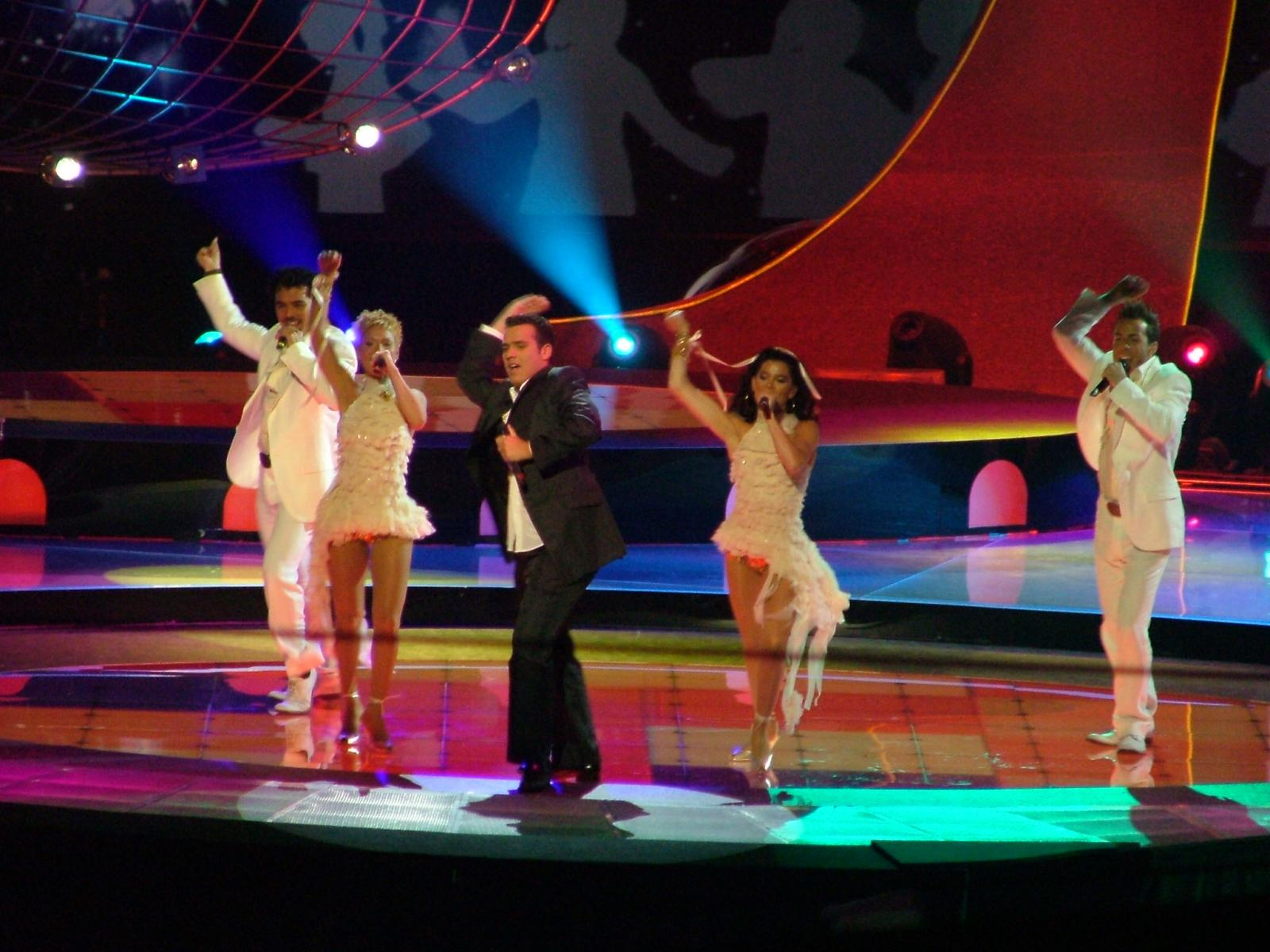
Ramón during a rehearsal before the final

According to Eurovision rules, all nations with the exceptions of the host country and the "Big Four" (France, Germany, Spain and the United Kingdom) are required to qualify from the semi-final in order to compete for the final; the top ten countries from the semi-final progress to the final. As a member of the "Big Four", Spain automatically qualified to compete in the final on 15 May 2004. In addition to their participation in the final, Spain is also required to broadcast and vote in the semi-final. The running order for the final in addition to the semi-final was decided through an allocation draw and Spain was subsequently drawn to open the final and perform in position 1, before the entry from Austria. Spain placed tenth in the final scoring 87 points.

In Spain, the semi-finals were broadcast on La 2 and the final was broadcast on La Primera with commentary by Beatriz Pécker. TVE appointed Anne Igartiburu as its spokesperson to announce the results of the Spanish televote during the final.

=== Voting ===
Below is a breakdown of points awarded to Spain and awarded by Spain in the semi-final and grand final of the contest. The nation awarded its 12 points to Andorra in the semi-final and to Germany in the grand final of the contest. Following the release of the televoting figures by the EBU after the conclusion of the competition, it was revealed that a total of 64,915 televotes were cast in Spain during the two shows: 25,910 votes during the semi-final and 39,005 votes during the final.

==== Points awarded to Spain ====
Points awarded to Spain (Final)
Score	Country
12 points	Andorra; Portugal
10 points	
8 points	France; Israel
7 points	Belgium; Cyprus
6 points	Switzerland
5 points	Romania
4 points	Netherlands
3 points	Greece; Malta; Monaco
2 points	Belarus; Germany; Turkey
1 point	Iceland; Macedonia; Poland

==== Points awarded by Spain ====
Points awarded by Spain (Semi-final)
Score	Country
12 points	Andorra
10 points	Ukraine
8 points	Serbia and Montenegro
7 points	Greece
6 points	Portugal
5 points	Netherlands
4 points	Israel
3 points	Finland
2 points	Albania
1 point	Cyprus

Points awarded by Spain (Final)
Score	Country
12 points	Germany
10 points	Romania
8 points	Ukraine
7 points	Greece
6 points	Serbia and Montenegro
5 points	Sweden
4 points	France
3 points	Cyprus
2 points	Turkey
1 point	Poland
