= Un Blodymary =

2006 song by Las Ketchup

Single by Las Ketchup

from the album Un Blodymary
- Language: Spanish
- Released: 2006
- Genre: Latin pop
- Length: 3:02
- Label: Warner Music Group
- Songwriter: Queco
- Producer: Various

Las Ketchup singles chronology
"Kusha Las Payas" (2002)	"Un Blodymary" (2006)

Eurovision Song Contest 2006 entry
- Country: Spain
- Artists: Pilar Muñoz; Lola Muñoz; Lucía Muñoz; Rocío Muñoz
- As: Las Ketchup
- Language: Spanish
- Composer: Manuel Ruiz Gómez "Queco"
- Lyricist: Manuel Ruiz Gómez "Queco"

Finals performance
- Final result: 21st
- Final points: 18

Entry chronology
- ◄ "Brujería" (2005)
- "I Love You Mi Vida" (2007) ►

Official performance video
- "Un Blodymary" (final) on YouTube

"Un Blodymary" (Spanish pronunciation: [um bloðiˈmeɾi]; "A Bloody Mary") is a song recorded by Spanish group Las Ketchup, written by Manuel Ruiz Gómez "Queco". It represented Spain in the Eurovision Song Contest 2006, placing twenty-first.

== Background ==
=== Conception ===
"Un Blodymary" is a song written by Manuel Ruiz Gómez "Queco" and recorded by Spanish group Las Ketchup.

=== Eurovision ===
On 27 February 2006, Televisión Española (TVE) announced during La 1's afternoon magazine programme España Directo that they had internally selected las Ketchup as their representative for the 51st edition of the Eurovision Song Contest. During that same programme, it was also revealed that they would sing the song "Un Blodymary".

On 20 May 2006, the Eurovision Song Contest grand final was held at the Nikos Galis Olympic Indoor Hall in Athens hosted by the Hellenic Broadcasting Corporation (ERT), and broadcast live throughout the continent. Las Ketchup performed "Un Blodymary" sixth on the night, following Norway's "Alvedansen" by Christine Guldbrandsen and preceding Malta's "I Do" by Fabrizio Faniello.

At the close of voting, it had received 18 points, placing twenty-first in a field of twenty-four. The song was succeeded as Spanish entry by "I Love You Mi Vida" by D'Nash.

=== Aftermath ===
"Un Blodymary" was the title single of Las Ketchup second studio album of the same name, released on 16 May 2006.

== Chart history ==
=== Weekly charts ===
Chart (2006)	Peak position
Finland (Suomen virallinen lista)	8
Hungary (Single Top 40)	10
Italy (FIMI)	32
Spain (Promusicae)	7
Sweden (Sverigetopplistan)	38
Switzerland (Schweizer Hitparade)	82
