= Kusha Las Payas =

Single by Las Ketchup

from the album Hijas del Tomate
- Released: 21 November 2002
- Genre: Flamenco rock
- Length: 2:47
- Label: Altra Moda; Columbia; Sony
- Songwriters: Manny Benito; Manuel Ruiz
- Producer: Manuel Ruiz

Las Ketchup singles chronology
"The Ketchup Song (Aserejé)" (2002)	"Kusha Las Payas" (2002)	"Un Blodymary" (2006)

"Kusha Las Payas" (Note: 'Listen [to] the non-gypsies': kusha is a contraction of escucha, 'listen', while payas is slang for 'non-gypsies'.) (Andalusian pronunciation: [ˈkuʃa la(h) ˈpaʝa(h)]) is a song performed by the Spanish pop group Las Ketchup. It was released in November 2002 as the second single from their debut studio album, Hijas del Tomate. It is a follow-up to their most successful single, "The Ketchup Song (Aserejé)", although this song was not as successful as the previous one.

The song is featured in the video game, SSX, but is region-exclusive to Spain only.

== Charts ==
Chart (2002–03)	Peak position
Austria (Ö3 Austria Top 40)	36
Czech Republic (IFPI)	15
Finland (Suomen virallinen lista)	21
France (SNEP)	38
Germany (GfK)	76
Italy (FIMI)	17
Portugal (AFP)	6
Romania (Romanian Top 100)	1
Spain (PROMUSICAE)	12
Sweden (Sverigetopplistan)	29
Switzerland (Schweizer Hitparade)	31

=== Year-end charts ===
Chart (2003)	Position
Romania (Romanian Top 100)	9
