= Vilamarxant CF =

Spanish football team

Vilamarxant
- Full name: Vilamarxant Club de Fútbol
- Founded: 1961; 65 years ago
- Ground: Germans Albiol, Vilamarxant, Valencian Community, Spain
- Capacity: 1,000
- President: David García
- Manager: Miguel Albiol
- League: Segona FFCV – Group 3
- 2024–25: Primera FFCV – Group 2, 16th of 16 (relegated)
- Website: vilamarxantcf.es
Home colours	Away colours

Vilamarxant Club de Fútbol is a Spanish football team based in Vilamarxant, in the autonomous Valencian Community. Founded in 1961, they play in Segona FFCV – Group 3, holding home games at Campo Municipal Germans Albiol, with a capacity of 1,000 people.

== History ==
Founded in 1961 as Villamarchante Club de Fútbol, the club ceased activities in 1970, only returning six years later under the name of Unión Deportiva Villamarchante. In 1995, the club was renamed Unión Deportiva Vilamarxant, and became Vilamarxant Club de Fútbol in 2003.

In June 2018, Vilamarxant achieved their first-ever promotion to Tercera División, after defeating Ribarroja CF in the play-offs.

== Season to season ==
Season	Tier	Division	Place	Copa del Rey
1961–62	6	3ª Reg.		
1962–63	6	3ª Reg.		
1963–64	5	2ª Reg.		
1964–65	4	1ª Reg.	20th	
1965–66	5	2ª Reg.	11th	
1966–67	5	2ª Reg.	8th	
1967–68	5	2ª Reg.	7th	
1968–69	5	2ª Reg.	12th	
1969–70	5	2ª Reg.	12th	
1970–1976	DNP			
1976–77	7	3ª Reg.	1st	
1977–78	7	2ª Reg.	15th	
1978–79	7	2ª Reg.	16th	
1979–80	8	3ª Reg.		
1980–81	7	2ª Reg.	5th	
1981–82	7	2ª Reg.	2nd	
1982–83	6	1ª Reg.	19th	
1983–84	7	2ª Reg.	7th	
1984–85	7	2ª Reg.	1st	
1985–86	6	1ª Reg.	14th	

Season	Tier	Division	Place	Copa del Rey
1986–87	6	1ª Reg.	5th	
1987–88	6	1ª Reg.	9th	
1988–89	6	1ª Reg.	4th	
1989–90	6	1ª Reg.	8th	
1990–91	6	1ª Reg.	6th	
1991–92	6	1ª Reg.	12th	
1992–93	6	1ª Reg.	7th	
1993–94	6	1ª Reg.	2nd	
1994–95	5	Reg. Pref.	15th	
1995–96	5	Reg. Pref.	2nd	
1996–97	5	Reg. Pref.	10th	
1997–98	5	Reg. Pref.	16th	
1998–99	6	1ª Reg.	9th	
1999–2000	6	1ª Reg.	9th	
2000–01	6	1ª Reg.	2nd	
2001–02	5	Reg. Pref.	18th	
2002–03	6	1ª Reg.	9th	
2003–04	6	1ª Reg.	16th	
2004–05	7	2ª Reg.	13th	
2005–06	7	2ª Reg.	6th	

Season	Tier	Division	Place	Copa del Rey
2006–07	7	2ª Reg.	2nd	
2007–08	6	1ª Reg.	7th	
2008–09	6	1ª Reg.	11th	
2009–10	6	1ª Reg.	5th	
2010–11	6	1ª Reg.	9th	
2011–12	6	1ª Reg.	9th	
2012–13	6	1ª Reg.	10th	
2013–14	6	1ª Reg.	2nd	
2014–15	5	Reg. Pref.	13th	
2015–16	5	Reg. Pref.	9th	
2016–17	5	Reg. Pref.	3rd	
2017–18	5	Reg. Pref.	1st	
2018–19	4	3ª	11th	
2019–20	4	3ª	17th	
2020–21	4	3ª	11th / 9th	
2021–22	6	Reg. Pref.	7th	
2022–23	6	Reg. Pref.	16th	
2023–24	7	1ª FFCV	11th	
2024–25	7	1ª FFCV	16th	
2025–26	8	2ª FFCV	12th	

Season	Tier	Division	Place	Copa del Rey
2026–27	8	2ª FFCV		

3 seasons in Tercera División
