= Hijas del Tomate =

Studio album by Las Ketchup
- Released: 30 July 2002
- Studio: Filgrana Studios, Cordoba
- Genre: Latin pop; new flamenco
- Length: 37:24
- Language: Spanish; English
- Label: Altra Moda; Columbia; Sony
- Producer: Manuel "Queco" Ruiz

Las Ketchup chronology
Hijas del Tomate (2002)	Un Blodymary (2006)

Singles from Hijas del Tomate
- 1. "The Ketchup Song (Aserejé)" Released: 10 June 2002; 2. "Kusha Las Payas" Released: 21 November 2002

Hijas del Tomate (English: "Daughters of the Tomato") is the debut studio album by Las Ketchup, released in 2002. It gained popularity particularly thanks to the number-one hit "The Ketchup Song (Aserejé)". The album received a nomination for a Latin Grammy Award for Best Pop Album by a Duo or Group with Vocals in 2003.

It is considered one of the best-selling Latin albums.

== Reception ==
Professional ratings
Review scores
Source	Rating
AllMusic	4/5 stars

It met success in several countries worldwide, including Spain and Finland, where it topped the albums charts. The album earned gold and platinum certifications in several countries in America and Europe.

== Track listing ==
1. "The Ketchup Song (Aserejé)" (Spanglish version) – 3:33
2. "Kusha Las Payas" – 2:46
3. "Un de Vez en Cuando" – 3:33
4. "Lánzame Los Trastos, Baby" – 3:24
5. "Sevillanas Pink" – 3:29
6. "The Ketchup Song (Aserejé)" (Hippy mix) – 3:31
7. "Krapuleo" – 3:30
8. "Me Persigue un Chulo" – 3:08
9. "Tengo un Novio Tántriko" – 3:15
10. "The Ketchup Song (Aserejé)" (Instrumental) – 3:45
11. "The Ketchup Song (Aserejé)" (Spanish version) – 3:30

== Charts ==
=== Weekly charts ===
Weekly chart performance for Hijas del Tomate
Chart (2002–2003)	Peak position
Austrian Albums (Ö3 Austria)	22
Belgian Albums (Ultratop Wallonia)	35
Czech Republic Albums (IFPI)	14
Danish Albums (Hitlisten)	27
Dutch Albums (Album Top 100)	23
Finnish Albums (Suomen virallinen lista)	1
French Albums (SNEP)	18
Greek Albums (IFPI)	1
German Albums (Offizielle Top 100)	20
Hungarian Albums (Mahasz)	5
Italian Albums (FIMI)	8
Norwegian Albums (VG-lista)	13
Portuguese Albums (AFP)	1
Spanish Albums (Promusicae)	1
Swedish Albums (Sverigetopplistan)	7
Swiss Albums (Schweizer Hitparade)	6
US Billboard 200	65
US Latin Pop Albums (Billboard)	1
US Top Latin Albums (Billboard)	1

=== Year-end charts ===
Year-end chart performance for Hijas del Tomate
Chart (2002)	Position
Austrian Albums (Ö3 Austria)	108
Finnish Albums (Suomen virallinen lista)	3
French Albums (SNEP)	140
German Albums (Offizielle Top 100)	160
Swedish Albums (Sverigetopplistan)	77
Swiss Albums (Schweizer Hitparade)	45

== Certifications and sales ==
Certifications and sales for Hijas del Tomate
Region	Certification	Certified units/sales
Argentina (CAPIF)	Gold	25,000
Chile (IFPI Chile)	Gold	20,000
Colombia (ASINCOL)	Gold	15,000
Finland (Musiikkituottajat)	2× Platinum	78,846
France (SNEP)	Gold	100,000^{*}
Germany	—	80,000
Greece (IFPI Greece)	Gold	15,000^{^}
Mexico (AMPROFON)	Platinum	220,000
Paraguay (SGP)	Gold	5,000
Perú (UNIMPRO)	Gold	5,000
Portugal (AFP)	2× Platinum	80,000^{^}
Spain (Promusicae)	Platinum	150,000
Sweden (GLF)	Gold	30,000^{^}
Switzerland (IFPI Switzerland)	Gold	20,000^{^}
United States (RIAA)	4× Platinum (Latin)	400,000^{^}
Uruguay (CUD)	Gold	2,000
Venezuela (AVINPRO)	Gold	10,000
Summaries
Europe (IFPI)	Platinum	1,000,000^{*}
Worldwide	—	2,600,000
^{*} Sales figures based on certification alone.^{^} Shipments figures based on certification alone.

== See also ==
- List of best-selling Latin albums
