= Tontxu =

Spanish singer-songwriter

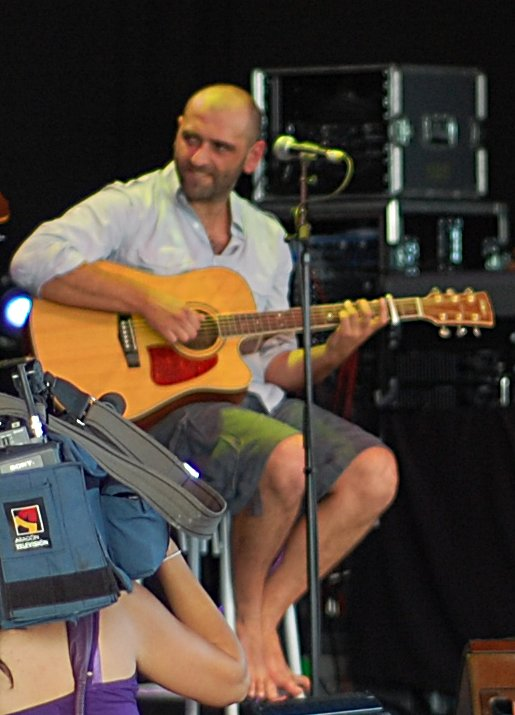
Famous in the Balcony of Music.

Juan Antonio Ipiña (Tontxu) (Bilbao (Spain), August 17, 1973) is a Spanish singer-songwriter.

He worked in the radio station "40 Principales" in Bilbao. Later, he went to Madrid where he started to sing in the café Libertad 8. There he met Rosana Arbelo, Andrés Molina, Rogelio Botanz, and Paco Bello.

== Discography ==
- Se vende: 1997 (Emi-Odeón). Featuring Marilia Andrés Casares, Hijas del Sol and Kepa Junkera.
- Corazón de mudanza: 1998. Featuring Olga Cerpa (Mestisay).
- Con un canto en los dientes: 2000. Featuring Inma Serrano "Volvería a tropezar en esa piedra".
- Tontxu Básico
- Contacto con la realidad: 2004. He made a cover of one Van Morrison song.
- Cuerdas vocales y consonantes: 2005, produced by Nacho Béjar.
- En el nombre del padre: 2008.
- Tontxu SOLO: 2013.
