= Ramón (Spanish singer) =

Spanish singer

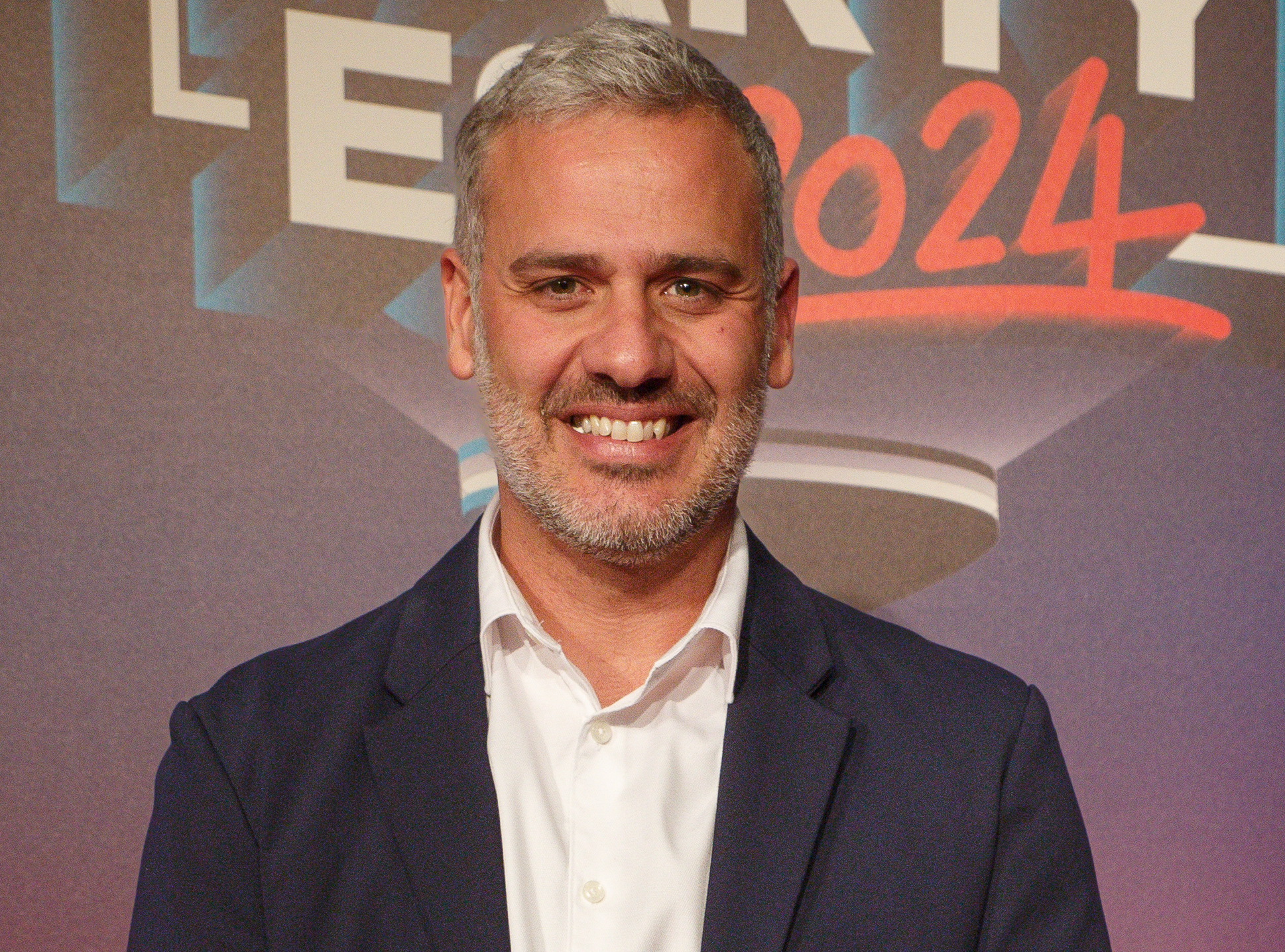
- Ramón in 2024

Background information
- Born: Ramón del Castillo Palop; 3 May 1985 (age 41); Las Palmas de Gran Canaria, Spain
- Genres: Pop, Latin pop
- Occupation: Singer-songwriter
- Years active: 2003–present

Ramón del Castillo Palop (born 3 May 1985) is a Spanish singer. He represented Spain at the Eurovision Song Contest 2004.

== Biography ==
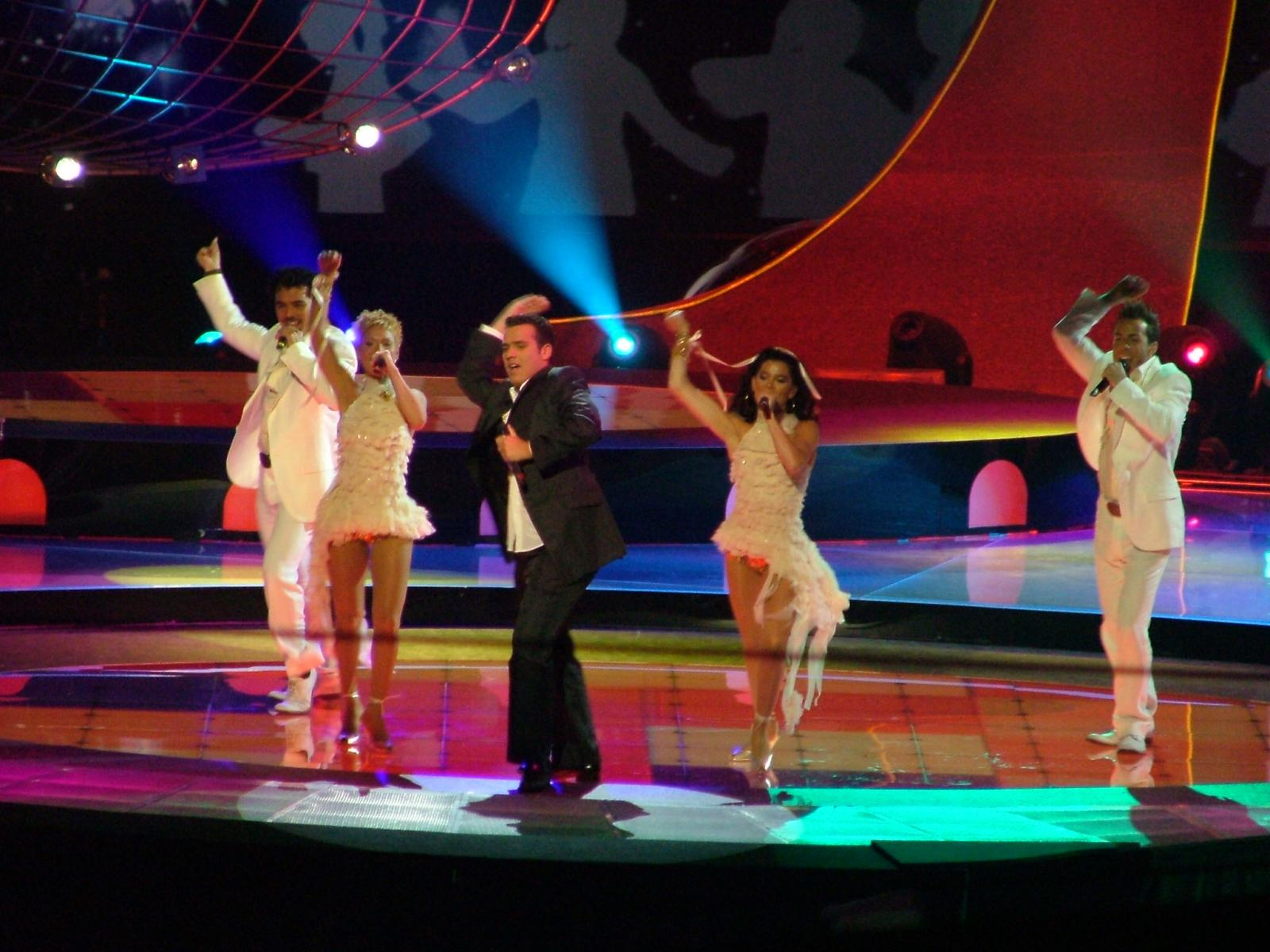
Ramón performing at the Eurovision final on 14 May 2004

Ramón was born on 3 May 1985 in Las Palmas in the Canary Islands, the youngest of three boys. He participated in the third season of Operación Triunfo (2003–2004), where he finished as the runner-up and, in a separate vote, was selected to represent Spain at the Eurovision in 2004 after Beth's eighth-place finish the year before. It was his first major musical appearance – he had not been a recording artist before Operación Triunfo.

With the song "Para llenarme de ti" ("To Be Filled By You"), Ramón finished in 10th place with 87 points in the final, which was Spain's last top ten result until 2012, when Pastora Soler managed to finish in 10th place again, with the song "Quédate conmigo".

"Para llenarme de ti", which was written by Kike Santander, was also a commercial success in Spain, peaking at number one on the Spanish Singles Chart. Ramón's first album Es así, produced by Toni and Xasqui Ten, debuted at number six on the Spanish Albums Chart.

In October 2006, Ramón's second album entitled Cambio de sentido was released. The album failed to chart. In 2008, Ramón served as a judge in the regional talent show ¡Quiero ser como Pepe!, aired on TV Canaria.

In 2010, Ramón abandoned his music career. Shortly after, he finished Audiovisual Production studies at IES Politécnico Las Palmas. In 2013, he moved to Oslo, Norway to work as a camera assistant for local production company Seefood TV.

== Discography ==
=== Albums ===
- Es así (Vale Music Records) – 2004 – No. 6 ESP
- Cambio de sentido (Multitrack Records) – 2006

Preceded by Beth with "Dime"	Spain in the Eurovision Song Contest; 2004	Succeeded by Son de Sol with "Brujería"
