= Las Supremas de Móstoles =

Spanish pop band

Las Supremas de Móstoles (or The Supremes of Móstoles, in English) is a Spanish pop band made up of three sisters: twins Vicky and Luisi (born 1958) and younger sister Susi (born 1963). They participated in Eurovisión 2005: Elige nuestra canción, the contest broadcast by TVE on 4 March and 5 March 2005 to choose the Spanish entry for the Eurovision Song Contest 2005, with the song "Eres un enfermo" (You are a pervert). The song's lyrics tell the story of a woman who has grown tired of her husband's addiction to cybersex. They finally ranked second with 21.8 percent of the votes; another sister trio, Son de Sol, were first with 24.2% and were selected to represent Spain at Eurovision.

Although "Eres un enfermo" was the first single they released, they previously worked as chorus girls for many singers like El Fary, Paulina Rubio, Los Del Río, Paloma San Basilio, José Vélez, Tam Tam Go, Camilo Sesto and Sergio Dalma, among others.
