= Miguel Albiol =

Spanish footballer

Personal information
- Full name: Miguel Albiol Tortajada
- Date of birth: 2 September 1981 (age 45)
- Place of birth: Vilamarxant, Spain
- Height: 1.77 m (5 ft 10 in)
- Position: Right midfielder

Team information
- Current team: Vilamarxant (technical director)

Youth career
- Ribarroja
- Valencia

Senior career*
Years	Team	Apps	(Gls)
1999–2003	Valencia B	81	(8)
2002–2003	Valencia	1	(0)
2003	→ Murcia (loan)	19	(0)
2003–2004	Recreativo	37	(0)
2004–2009	Rayo Vallecano	190	(18)
2009–2015	Murcia	135	(6)
Total		463	(32)

International career
1999	Spain U17	3	(0)
2001	Spain U20	1	(0)
2002	Spain U21	2	(0)
- * Club domestic league appearances and goals

Miguel Albiol Tortajada (Spanish: [miˈɣel alˈβjol]; born 2 September 1981) is a Spanish former professional footballer who played mainly as a right midfielder.

In a 16-year career, he amassed Segunda División totals of 178 matches and two goals over seven seasons, in representation of three clubs. In La Liga, he appeared for Valencia.

== Club career ==
Born in Vilamarxant, Valencian Community, Albiol was a product of hometown Valencia's youth ranks as younger brother Raúl after him, and played once with its first team, during 2002–03's La Liga. He finished that season in the Segunda División with Real Murcia, featuring regularly en route to the club's promotion.

Released by the Che, Albiol spent a further year with Recreativo de Huelva (also second tier), then had a steady period with Rayo Vallecano. He was instrumental in the latter side's 2008 promotion to division two, after four consecutive playoff failures.

In July 2009, apparently after having everything arranged with Hércules, Albiol agreed on a return move to Murcia, signing for three years. He appeared in 30 games in his first season – 22 starts – which ended in second-division relegation.

== Personal life ==
Albiol's younger brother, Raúl, was also a footballer. He represented with success Valencia, Real Madrid, Napoli, Villarreal and the Spain national team.
