= Spain in the Eurovision Song Contest 2005 =

- Eurovision Song Contest 2005
- Participating broadcaster: Televisión Española (TVE)
- Country: Spain
- Selection process: Eurovisión 2005: Elige nuestra canción
- Selection date: 5 March 2005

Competing entry
- Song: "Brujería"
- Artist: Son de Sol
- Songwriters: Alfredo Panebianco

Placement
- Final result: 21st, 28 points

Participation chronology

Spain was represented at the Eurovision Song Contest 2005 with the song "Brujería", written by Alfredo Panebianco, and performed by the group Son de Sol. The Spanish participating broadcaster, Televisión Española (TVE), organised the national final Eurovisión 2005: Elige nuestra canción in order to select its entry for the contest. The national final consisted of a semi-final and a final and involved twelve artists and songs. Six entries ultimately qualified to compete in the televised final where a public televote exclusively selected "Brujería" performed by Son de Sol as the winner, receiving 24.2% of the votes.

As a member of the "Big Four", Spain automatically qualified to compete in the final of the Eurovision Song Contest. Performing in position 10, Spain placed twenty-first out of the 24 participating countries with 28 points.

== Background ==
Prior to the 2005 contest, Televisión Española (TVE) had participated in the Eurovision Song Contest representing Spain forty-four times since its first entry in 1961. It has won the contest on two occasions: in 1968 with the song "La, la, la" performed by Massiel and in 1969 with the song "Vivo cantando" performed by Salomé, the latter having won in a four-way tie with France, the Netherlands, and the United Kingdom. It has also finished second four times, with "En un mundo nuevo" by Karina in 1971, "Eres tú" by Mocedades in 1973, "Su canción" by Betty Missiego in 1979, and "Vuelve conmigo" by Anabel Conde in 1995. In 2004, it placed tenth with the song "Para llenarme de ti" performed by Ramón.

As part of its duties as participating broadcaster, TVE organises the selection of its entry in the Eurovision Song Contest and broadcasts the event in the country. TVE confirmed its intentions to participate at the 2005 contest on 16 December 2004. From 2000 to 2004, TVE had set up national finals featuring a competition among several artists and songs to choose both the song and performer to compete at Eurovision for Spain, including the reality television music competition Operación Triunfo. The procedure was continued for their 2005 entry but without the incorporation of Operación Triunfo.

== Before Eurovision ==
=== Eurovisión 2005: Elige nuestra canción ===
Eurovisión 2005: Elige nuestra canción was the national final organised by TVE that took place at the Estudios Buñuel in Madrid, hosted by Carlos Lozano, Patricia Pérez and Ainhoa Arbizu. The national final consisted of two shows which commenced on 4 March 2005 and concluded with a winning song and artist during the final on 5 March 2005. All shows were broadcast on La Primera and TVE Internacional.

==== Competing entries ====
A submission period was open from 31 January 2005 until 10 February 2005. Only artists signed to record labels were eligible to submit entries. At the conclusion of the submission period, 100 entries were received. A committee consisting of journalists, producers and professionals at TVE evaluated the entries received and selected twelve entries for the national final. The twelve competing acts were announced on 17 February 2005 via TVE's official website. On 18 February 2005, "Dame el oportunidad", written by Alejandro de Pinedo and to have been performed by Tony Álvarez, was withdrawn from the national final and replaced with the song "El swatch" performed by A-Crew. On 22 February 2005, "Déjame", written by Music Doll and to have been performed by Mayka was also withdrawn from the national final and replaced with the song "Echo de menos" performed by Felipe Conde. The competing songs were premiered between 28 February and 4 March 2005 on the La Primera morning show Por la mañana, presented by Inés Ballester, as well as on special shows, presented by Patricia Pérez and Ainoha Arbízu that were broadcast on La Primera and La 2.

==== Semi-final ====
The semi-final took place on 4 March 2005. The top six entries qualified for the final exclusively through a public televote. In addition to the performances of the competing entries, guest performers included Rosa López (who represented Spain in 2002) and María Isabel (who won Junior Eurovision for Spain in 2004).

Semi-final – 4 March 2005
R/O	Artist	Song	Songwriter(s)	Result
1	María Lorente	"Vente pal sur"	José Luís Santamaría; Javier Robledo	—N/a
2	Jaster	"Cómo olvidarte"	Javián	—N/a
3	Las Supremas de Móstoles	"Eres un enfermo"	José Manuel Muñiz Mergelina	Qualified
4	Lanco	"Nada para ti, nada para mí"	Alberto Lanco	Qualified
5	A-Crew	"El swatch"	Agustín Sarazá González	—N/a
6	Enzo	"Quién dirá"	Julián García García	Qualified
7	Katherina	"Boca loca"	Carlos Garí	—N/a
8	Pierre N'Sue	"Quizás mejor así"	Pierre N'Sue; Sergi Pérez; Berq	—N/a
9	Son de Sol	"Brujería"	Alfredo Panebianco	Qualified
10	Felipe Conde	"Echo de menos"	Felipe Conde	Qualified
11	Gema Castaño	"Santo Job"	Gema Castaño	—N/a
12	Yulia	"Arriba el mundo"	Jordi Cubino; Yulia Valentayn	Qualified

==== Final ====
The final took place on 5 March 2005. The six entries that qualified from the preceding semi-final competed and the winner, "Brujería" performed by Son de Sol, was selected exclusively through a public televote. In addition to the performances of the competing entries, guest performers included Francisco, Marta Sánchez and Paulina Rubio.

Final – 5 March 2005
R/O	Artist	Song	Televote	Place
1	Las Supremas de Móstoles	"Eres un enfermo"	21.8%	2
2	Lanco	"Nada para ti, nada para mí"	—N/a	5
3	Enzo	"Quién dirá"	—N/a	6
4	Son de Sol	"Brujería"	24.2%	1
5	Felipe Conde	"Echo de menos"	16.4%	3
6	Yulia	"Arriba el mundo"	—N/a	4

==== Ratings ====
Viewing figures by show
Show	Air date	Viewers (in millions)	Ref.
Semi-final	4 March 2005	1.600	
Final	5 March 2005	2.063	

== At Eurovision ==
According to Eurovision rules, all nations with the exceptions of the host country, the "Big Four" (France, Germany, Spain and the United Kingdom) and the ten highest placed finishers in the 2004 contest are required to qualify from the semi-final in order to compete for the final; the top ten countries from the semi-final progress to the final. As a member of the "Big 4", Spain automatically qualified to compete in the final on 21 May 2005. In addition to their participation in the final, Spain is also required to broadcast and vote in the semi-final on 19 May 2005. During the running order draw for the semi-final and final on 22 March 2005, Spain was placed to perform in position 10 in the final, following the entry from Cyprus and before the entry from Israel. Spain placed twenty-first in the final, scoring 28 points.

In Spain, the semi-finals were broadcast on La 2 with commentary by Beatriz Pécker, Ainhoa Arbizu and Carlos Cerezo, while the final was broadcast on La Primera with commentary by Beatriz Pécker. TVE appointed Ainhoa Arbizu as its spokesperson to announce the Spanish votes during the final. The broadcast of the final was watched by 4.712 million viewers in Spain with a market share of 35.5%. This represented a decrease of 14.6% from the previous year with 2.114 million less viewers.

=== Voting ===
Below is a breakdown of points awarded to Spain and awarded by Spain in the semi-final and grand final of the contest. The nation awarded its 12 points to Romanian in the semi-final and the final of the contest.

==== Points awarded to Spain ====
Points awarded to Spain (Final)
Score	Country
12 points	Andorra
10 points	
8 points	Portugal
7 points	
6 points	
5 points	
4 points	France; Switzerland
3 points	
2 points	
1 point	

==== Points awarded by Spain ====
Points awarded by Spain (Semi-final)
Score	Country
12 points	Romania
10 points	Andorra
8 points	Denmark
7 points	Poland
6 points	Bulgaria
5 points	Portugal
4 points	Israel
3 points	Hungary
2 points	Iceland
1 point	Moldova

Points awarded by Spain (Final)
Score	Country
12 points	Romania
10 points	Denmark
8 points	Greece
7 points	Malta
6 points	Israel
5 points	Hungary
4 points	Moldova
3 points	Norway
2 points	Sweden
1 point	Ukraine
