= Vicente Seguí =

Vicente Seguí Porres
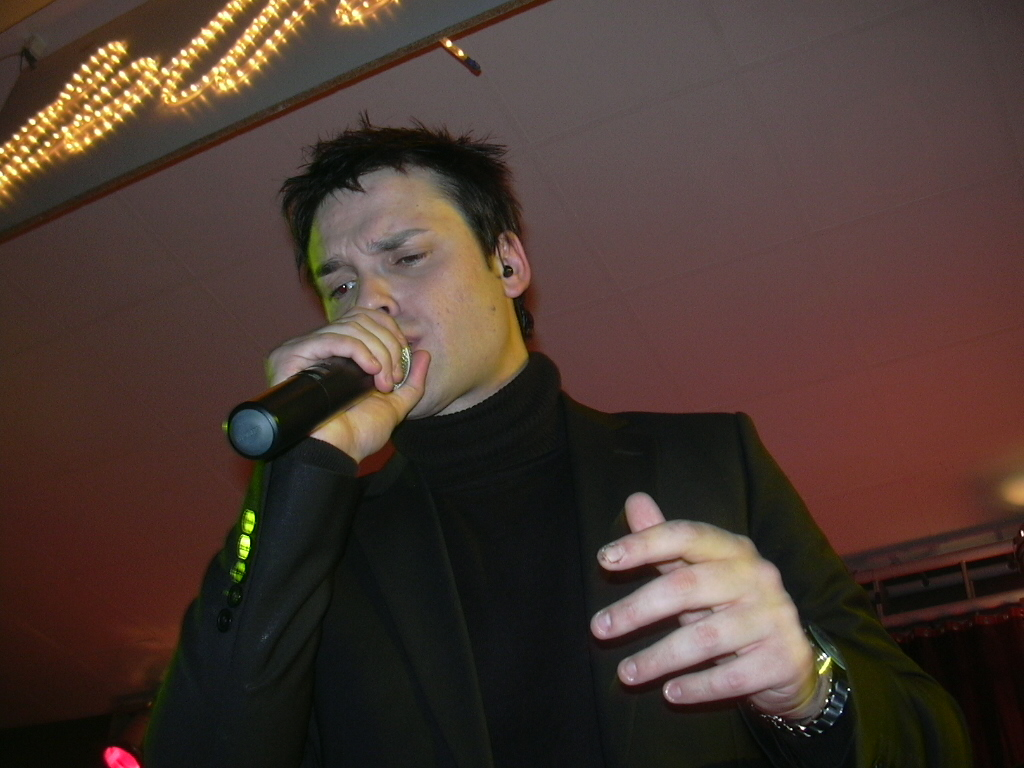

Background information
- Born: 25 December 1978 (age 47); Vilamarxant, Valencia, Spain
- Genres: Pop
- Occupation: Singer
- Years active: 2003 – present
- Labels: Vale Music (2004–2006); Warner Music (2006–2008); Independent (2008–present)
- Website: vicentesegui.com

Vicente Seguí Porres, (b. 25 December 1978) better known simply as Vicente, is a Spanish singer born in Vilamarxant. He started with the Valencia orchestra "La Metro". He took part and won the title in the third series of Operación Triunfo in 2003.

He later released three albums and did many concerts. He also collaborated in musical programs on Valencian TV including Bona Nit and El Picú as copresenter and singer.

== Discography ==
- Confidencias (released on Universal – Vale Music on 20 April 2004 produced by Alejandro Abad)
- Gardel Mediterráneo (released on Warner Music on 12 September 2006, produced by Nacho Mañó)
- Mirándote lanzado (released 20 July 2009) produced by Jose Manuel Domenech
