= Inma Serrano =

Spanish singer-songwriter (born 1968)

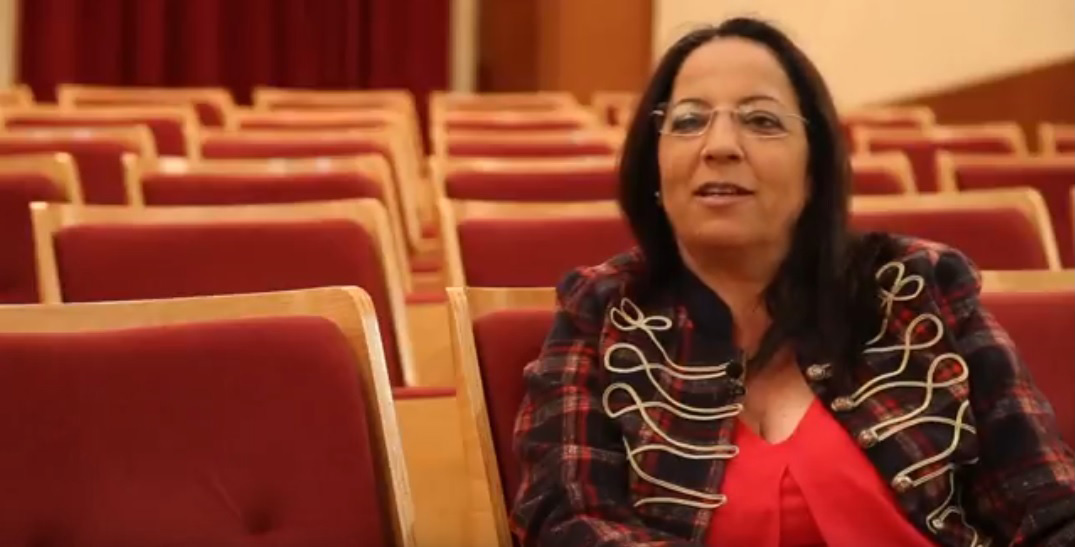
Image of Inma Serrano

Inma Serrano is a Spanish singer-songwriter. Serrano was born in Alicante, Spain, in 1968.

She has lived in Alicante, Valencia, Barcelona, and Madrid. In 2003, she created the record label "Cerebro Demente Records". With this record company, she released "Soy capaz y pequeñas joyas" with collaborations of Mercedes Ferrer, Tontxu, Jerry Fish, Armando y el Expreso de Bohemia, Mai Meneses and Anthony Blake. She has taken part in several TV programmes and humanitarian projects such as "Cuarto mundo" (2006).

== Discography ==
- 1995 – Inma Serrano
- 1997 – Cantos de sirena
- 1999 – Rosas de papel
- 2003 – Soy capaz y pequeñas joyas
- 2004 – Grandes éxitos
- 2006 – Polvo de estrellas (CD/DVD)
- 2008 – Inma I (in Catalan)
- 2009 – Inma II (in Spanish)
- 2010 – Voy a ser sincera
