= Vilamarxant =

- Municipality
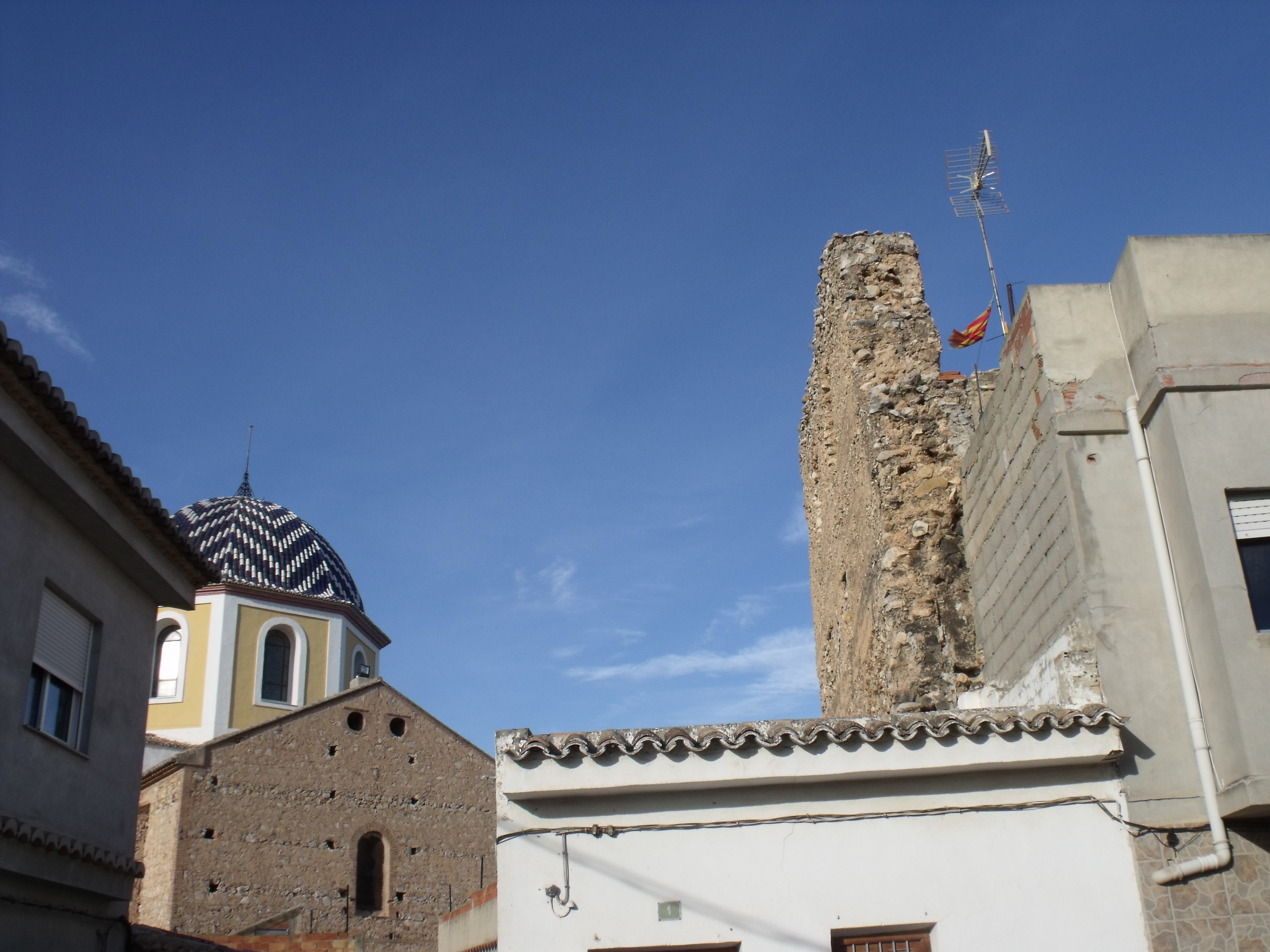
- Church and Arab tower

- Coat of arms

- Location in Spain
- Coordinates: 39°34′8″N 0°37′14″W
- Country: Spain
- Autonomous community: Valencian Community
- Province: Valencia
- Comarca: Camp de Túria
- Judicial district: Llíria

Government
  - Alcalde: Vicente Betoret Coll

Area
  - Total: 71.1 km^{2} (27.5 sq mi)
- Elevation: 160 m (520 ft)

Population (2025-01-01)
  - Total: 11,403
  - Density: 160/km^{2} (415/sq mi)
- Demonym(s): Vilamarxanter, vilamarxantera
- Time zone: UTC+1 (CET)
  - Summer (DST): UTC+2 (CEST)
- Postal code: 46191
- Official language(s): Valencian
- Website: Official website

Vilamarxant (Valencian: [ˌvilamaɾˈtʃant]; Spanish: Villamarchante [ˈbiʎamaɾˈtʃante]) is a municipality in the comarca of Camp de Túria in the Valencian Community, Spain.

== Notable people ==
- Raúl Albiol, (born 4 September 1985) is a Spanish professional footballer who plays for Spanish club Villarreal CF and the Spanish national team.
- Miguel Albiol (born 2 September 1981) is a Spanish professional footballer

== See also ==
- List of municipalities in Valencia
