= Austria in the Eurovision Song Contest 2005 =

- Eurovision Song Contest 2005
- Participating broadcaster: Österreichischer Rundfunk (ORF)
- Country: Austria
- Selection process: Song.Null.Fünf
- Selection date: 25 February 2005

Competing entry
- Song: "Y así"
- Artist: Global Kryner
- Songwriters: Edi Köhldorfer; Christof Spörk

Placement
- Semi-final result: Failed to qualify (21st)

Participation chronology

Austria was represented at the Eurovision Song Contest 2005 with the song "Y así", written by Christof Spörk and Edi Köhldorfer, and performed by the group Global Kryner. The Austrian participating broadcaster, Österreichischer Rundfunk (ORF), organised the national final Song.Null.Fünf in order to select its entry for the contest. Five artists and ten songs competed in a televised show where a public vote consisting of regional televoting and mobile phone voting exclusively selected "Y así" performed by Global Kryner as the winner.

Austria competed in the semi-final of the Eurovision Song Contest, which took place on 19 May 2005. Performing as the opening entry for the show in position 1, "Y así" was not announced among the top 10 entries of the semi-final and therefore did not qualify to compete in the final. It was later revealed that Austria placed twenty-first out of the 25 participating countries in the semi-final with 30 points.

== Background ==
Prior to the 2005 contest, Österreichischer Rundfunk (ORF) has participated in the Eurovision Song Contest representing Austria forty-one times since its first entry in 1957. It has won the contest on one occasion: in 1966 with the song "Merci, Chérie" performed by Udo Jürgens. Following the introduction of semi-finals for the 2004 contest, it has featured in only one final. Its least successful result has been last place, achieved on seven occasions, most recently in 1991. It has also received nul points on three occasions: in 1962, in 1988, and in 1991.

As part of its duties as participating broadcaster, ORF organises the selection of its entry in the Eurovision Song Contest and broadcasts the event in the country. The broadcaster confirmed its intentions to participate at the 2005 contest on 17 September 2004. From 1995 to 2000, ORF has held an internal selection to choose the artist and song, while it had set up national finals with several artists to choose both the song and performer from 2002 to 2004. Along with its participation confirmation, the broadcaster also announced that it would select its entry for the 2005 contest through a national final.

== Before Eurovision ==
=== Song.Null.Fünf ===
Song.Null.Fünf (Song.Zero.Five) was the national final organised by ORF to select its entry for the Eurovision Song Contest 2005. The competition took place on 25 February 2005 at the ORF Center in Vienna, hosted by Mirjam Weichselbraun and Christian Clerici and broadcast on ORF eins. The national final was watched by 630,000 viewers in Austria.

==== Format ====
Five artists with two songs each competed in the competition where the winner was selected by exclusively by public voting. Viewers were able to cast their votes via landline phones and the voting results of each of the nine Federal States of Austria created an overall ranking from which points from 1-8, 10 and 12 were distributed. Viewers were also able to vote via mobiles phones and SMS and the overall ranking of the entries was also assigned scores from 1-8, 10 and 12. After the combination of all scores, the entry with the highest number of points was selected as the winner.

==== Competing entries ====
ORF opened two separate applications: one for professional artists with a contract to a record company between 17 and 30 September 2004 and one for newcomers without any contract to a record company between 4 and 26 November 2004. All applications were reviewed by a team of music professionals led by music producer Markus Spiegel which selected five artists to each submit two songs for the national final. The artists and songs were revealed during a press conference at the ORF Center in Vienna on 10 January 2005 and among the competing artists was former Austrian Eurovision representative Alf Poier who represented Austria in 2003. DJ Ötzi had initially been selected for the competition, but he withdrew prior to the artists' announcement due to issues with creating his two candidate Eurovision songs.

Artist	Song	Songwriter(s)
Alf Poier	"Good Old Europe Is Dying"	Alf Poier
Alf Poier	"Hotel, Hotel"	Alf Poier
Global Kryner	"Dreaming"	Christof Spörk, Edi Köhldorfer
Global Kryner	"Y así"	Christof Spörk, Edi Köhldorfer
Jade Davies	"Just Like That"	Frank Lebel, Bob Gutdeutsch
Jade Davies	"Perfect World"	Helmut Schartlmüller, Hubertus Hohenlohe
Marque	"In the Universe"	Marcus Nigsch, Mary Susan Applegate
Marque	"Who U R"	Marcus Nigsch
Mystic Alpin	"Back Home"	Alfred Jaklitsch
Mystic Alpin	"One World"	Alfred Jaklitsch

==== Final ====
The televised final took place on 25 February 2005. Each of the five artists competed with two songs where public televoting split between Austria's nine regions and mobile phone votes selected "Y así" performed by Global Kryner as the winner.

Final – 25 February 2005
R/O	Artist	Song	Points	Place
1	Global Kryner	"Y así"	102	1
2	Jade Davies	"Just Like That"	22	9
3	Alf Poier	"Hotel, Hotel"	51	7
4	Mystic Alpin	"Back Home"	73	4
5	Marque	"Who U R"	53	6
6	Global Kryner	"Dreaming"	54	5
7	Jade Davies	"Perfect World"	19	10
8	Alf Poier	"Good Old Europe Is Dying"	98	2
9	Mystic Alpin	"One World"	74	3
10	Marque	"In the Universe"	34	8

Detailed Regional Televoting Results
R/O	Song	Burgenland	Carinthia	Lower Austria	Upper Austria	Salzburg	Styria	Tyrol	Vorarlberg	Vienna	Mobile phones	Total
1	"Y así"	12	12	10	7	12	10	12	7	10	10	102
2	"Just Like That"	3	3	1	1	6	1	1	2	3	1	22
3	"Hotel, Hotel"	2	2	6	6	5	8	7	3	6	6	51
4	"Back Home"	8	7	7	10	10	6	8	5	5	7	73
5	"Who U R"	6	6	4	3	3	4	6	12	4	5	53
6	"Dreaming"	5	5	5	5	4	5	5	8	8	4	54
7	"Perfect World"	4	1	2	2	2	2	2	1	1	2	19
8	"Good Old Europe Is Dying"	10	10	12	8	8	12	10	4	12	12	98
9	"One World"	7	8	8	12	7	7	4	6	7	8	74
10	"In the Universe"	1	4	3	4	1	3	3	10	2	3	34

=== Controversy ===
The national final caused controversy due to the format that was amended shortly before the show (the original format was to include two rounds of public voting where one song per artist would be selected from the first round to advance to the second round). When the results were published, 80% of the 337,179 votes registered were submitted via mobile phones but distributed just as many points as each federal state did. It was also revealed that "Good Old Europe Is Dying" performed by Alf Poier received the most overall votes (45,000 votes more than "Y así") but placed second due to the voting system. Poier's manager René Berto stated: "We prefer to be the moral winner rather than winning a cheap victory. Global Kryner did not win because of the fans, but because of ORF's last-minute change of the voting system."

== At Eurovision ==
According to Eurovision rules, all nations with the exceptions of the host country, the "Big Four" (France, Germany, Spain and the United Kingdom), and the ten highest placed finishers in the 2004 contest are required to qualify from the semi-final on 19 May 2005 in order to compete for the final on 21 May 2005; the top ten countries from the semi-final progress to the final. On 22 March 2005, a special allocation draw was held which determined the running order for the semi-final and Austria was set to open the show and perform in position 1, before the entry from Lithuania. At the end of the show, Austria was not announced among the top 10 entries in the semi-final and therefore failed to qualify to compete in the final. It was later revealed that Austria placed twenty-first in the semi-final, receiving a total of 30 points.

The semi-final and the final were broadcast in Austria on ORF 2 with commentary by Andi Knoll and via radio on Ö3 with commentary by Martin Blumenau. ORF appointed Dodo Roscic as its spokesperson to announce the Austrian votes during the final.

=== Voting ===
Below is a breakdown of points awarded to Austria and awarded by Austria in the semi-final and grand final of the contest. The nation awarded its 12 points to Croatia in the semi-final and to Serbia and Montenegro in the final of the contest.

==== Points awarded to Austria ====
Points awarded to Austria (Semi-final)
Score	Country
12 points	
10 points	Slovenia
8 points	
7 points	Andorra
6 points	Switzerland
5 points	Albania
4 points	
3 points	
2 points	
1 point	Germany; Greece

==== Points awarded by Austria ====
Points awarded by Austria (Semi-final)
Score	Country
12 points	Croatia
10 points	Romania
8 points	Moldova
7 points	Hungary
6 points	Denmark
5 points	Poland
4 points	Macedonia
3 points	Slovenia
2 points	Norway
1 point	Switzerland

Points awarded by Austria (Final)
Score	Country
12 points	Serbia and Montenegro
10 points	Bosnia and Herzegovina
8 points	Croatia
7 points	Turkey
6 points	Romania
5 points	Malta
4 points	Greece
3 points	Albania
2 points	Moldova
1 point	Israel
