= Bilzingsleben (Paleolithic site) =

Stone quarry in Thuringia, Germany

- Fundplatz Bilzingsleben (German)
- Bilzingsleben Paleolithic Site
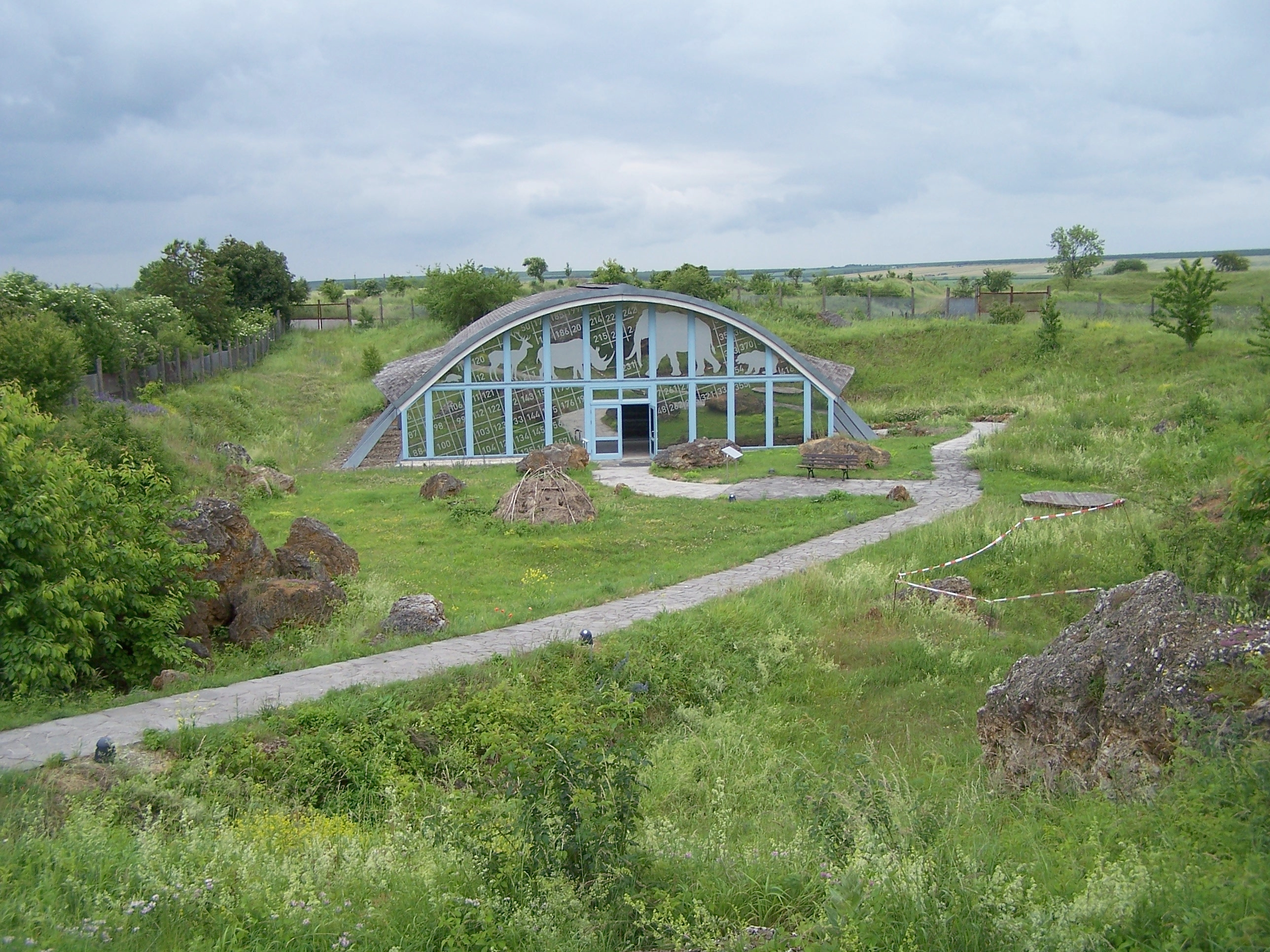
- On-site exhibition

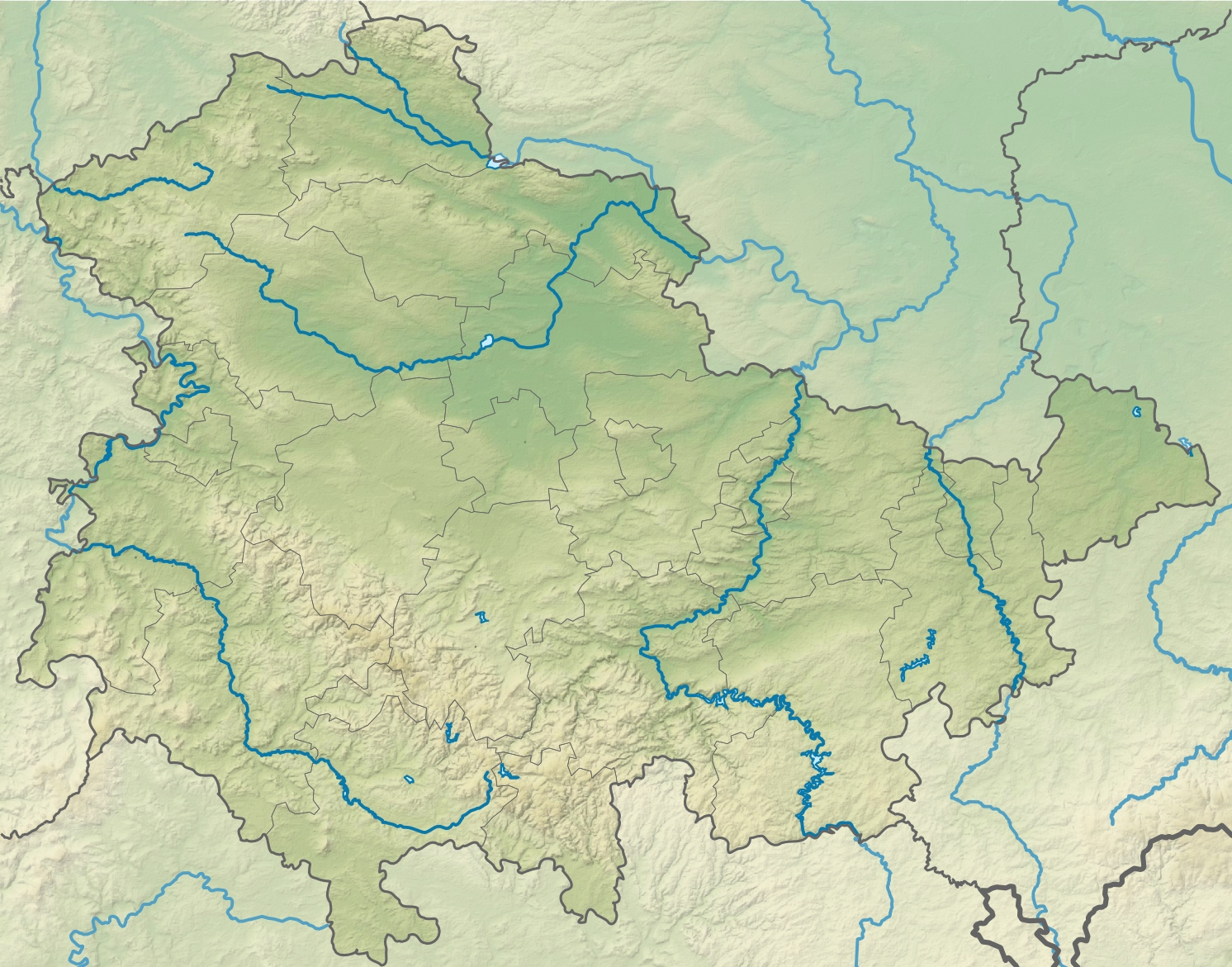
- Location in Germany Bilzingsleben (Paleolithic site) (Germany)
- 51°16′52″N 11°04′07″E
- Periods: Paleolithic
- Associated with: Homo erectus
- Location: Near Bilzingsleben, Sömmerda district
- Region: State of Thuringia, Germany

Site notes
- Archaeologists: 1922, 1971 to 1992

Bilzingsleben (German: Fundplatz Bilzingsleben, lit. discovery site Bilzingsleben) is a former stone quarry in Thuringia, Germany, notable for its wealth of palaeolithic human fossils and artifacts.

One of the oldest buildings in the world and one of the oldest pieces of art were found at the site.

== Geology ==
Bilzingsleben is located on the northern border of the Thuringian Basin, a depression made of triassic Keuper. To the North are the Kyffhäuser mountains, Hainleite and Schmücke that contain mainly Bunter sandstone and Muschelkalk deposits. The regions are separated by the local hercynian fault-line (Finne-Störung). The fault-line is the cause for numerous springs in this area. The emerging spring waters in turn have dissolved the local calcareous rocks and formed the interglacial travertine deposits that cover the Bilzingsleben site. The 400.000 year long conservation is attributed to the travertine's remarkable resilience to erosional processes.

The site itself was part of a fluvial terrace in Pleistocene, Central European river basin now situated 1.5 km (0.93 mi) south of the village of Bilzingsleben, Sömmerda district at 175 m (574.15 ft) above sea level in an old travertine quarry, called Steinrinne, where travertines have been quarried since early modern times and the material was used in the towns of the region, for example Kindelbrück's city wall.

== History of the excavation ==
Fossilized bones at the site had already been found since the 13th century. In 1710 David Siegmund Büttner published his book "Rudera diluvii testes i.e. Zeichen und Zeugen der Sündfluth" (Signs and witnesses of the flood). In 1818 Freiherr Friedrich von Schlotheim (1765-1832) found a human skull covered by lime concretions. It is lost today. In 1908 geologist Ewald Wüst (1875-1934) of the University of Halle-Wittenberg published his first work on local flint artifacts. Amateur researcher Adolf Spengler took up work at the site in 1922.

In 1969 Dietrich Mania, later professor at the University of Jena, discovered numerous fossils and artifacts during a routine investigation. Under the auspices of the Halle State Museum of Prehistory a systematic excavation was launched in 1971 that lasted until 1992 during which 1,600 m^{2} (17,222.26 sq ft) were documented and several human fossils were unearthed. Consequently administration of the site has been handed to the University of Jena.

== Dating ==
Hominin timeline
← / Earlier apes; ← / Gorilla split; ← / Chimpanzee split; ← / Earliest bipedal; ← / Earliest sign of Ardipithecus; ← / Earliest sign of Australopithecus; ← / Earliest stone tools; ← / Earliest sign of Homo; ← / Dispersal beyond Africa; ← / Earliest fire / cooking; ← / Earliest rock art; ← / Earliest clothes; ← / Modern humans
(million years ago)

The site belongs to the Reinsdorf interglacial, c. 370,000 BP.

== Human remains ==
In 1974 a piece of a human skull was identified among the finds. To date, 37 human bones and teeth have been found, mainly parts of the skull. They represent the remains of at least three individuals and have been classified as Homo erectus bilzingslebenensis by Emanuel Vlček (Prague). The remains of the skulls show that they have been intentionally smashed postmortem, maybe as part of a burial rite.

== Environment ==
Both plant impressions in the travertine and pollen remains allow the reconstruction of the local environment. There are two deposition phases. Both are dominated by woodland species. The first phase (limnic chalk mixed with travertine sand) is dominated by hazel (Corylus), ash (Fraxinus) and oak (Quercus). The second phase (pure limnic chalk) is dominated by hornbeam (Carpinus), alder (Alnus) and pine (Pinus).

36 plant species are attested by impressions in the travertine, among them 14 tree and shrub species:

- Pedunculate oak (Quercus robur)
- Maple (Acer campestre, Acer pseudoplatanus)
- Large-leaved linden (Tilia platyphyllos)
- European ash (Fraxinus excelsior)
- European cornel (Cornus mas)
- Common hazel (Corylus avellana)
- Common aspen (Populus tremula)
- Downy birch (Betula pubescens)
- European box (Buxus sempervirens)
- European barberry (Berberis vulgaris)
- Hungarian lilac (Syringa josikaea)
- European nettle tree (Celtis australis)
- Scarlet firethorn (Pyracantha coccinea)
- Shrubby cinquefoil (Dasiphora fruticosa).

The woods were mainly made up of oaks and box (Buxo-Quercetum). Herbs like wormwood, sorrel, ferns and grasses attest the presence of open steppes or meadows. Sedges and rushes grew on the lakeshore, waterlilies and Sphagnum moss in the lakes.

The remains of 54 species of animals have been found in Bilzingsleben, 35 species of mammals, six kinds of birds, three reptiles, three amphibians and five kinds of fishes. Among the mammals are:

- Straight-tusked elephant (Palaeoloxodon antiquus)
- Rhinoceros (Stephanorhinus kirchbergensis, Stephanorhinus hemitoechus)
- Aurochs (Bos primigenius)
- Steppe wisent (Bison priscus)
- Horse (Equus sp.)
- Red deer (Cervus elaphus)
- Fallow deer (Dama dama)
- Giant deer (Megaloceros sp.)
- Roe deer (Capreolus suessenbornensis)
- Bear (Ursus deningeri-spelaeus)
- Lion (Panthera spelaea)
- European wildcat (Felis silvestris)
- Red fox (Vulpes vulpes)
- Wild boar (Sus scrofa)
- Wolf (Canis lupus)
- Barbary macaque (Macaca sylvana)
- A now extinct beaver (Trogontherium cuvieri).

Woodland animals predominate, but there are some species that prefer more open habitats as well, like rhinoceros, horse and bison. Mollusks attest to a climate that was warmer and wetter than today. The average annual temperature is supposed to have been 9° to 13 °C, the annual precipitation 800 mm.

=== Special finds ===
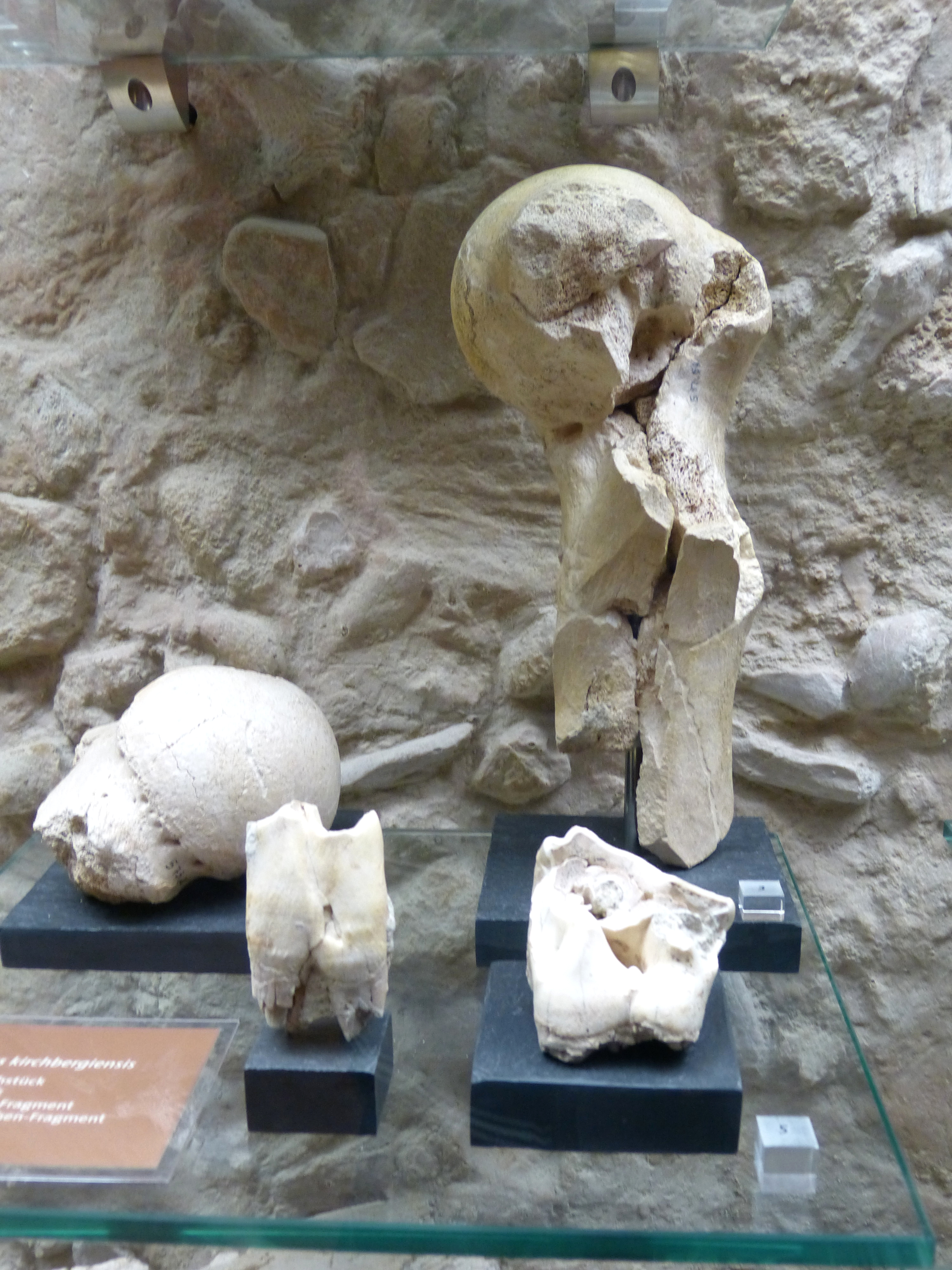
Remains of a Stephanorhinus

The lithic industry is characterized by chopping tools of diminutive sizes. There are no true hand axes. The raw material is mainly flint, although quartzite, quartz and travertine have been used as well. There are numerous bone tools (hoes, scrapers, points and gougers). Some hoes are made of antler or ivory. Even wooden artefacts have been preserved.

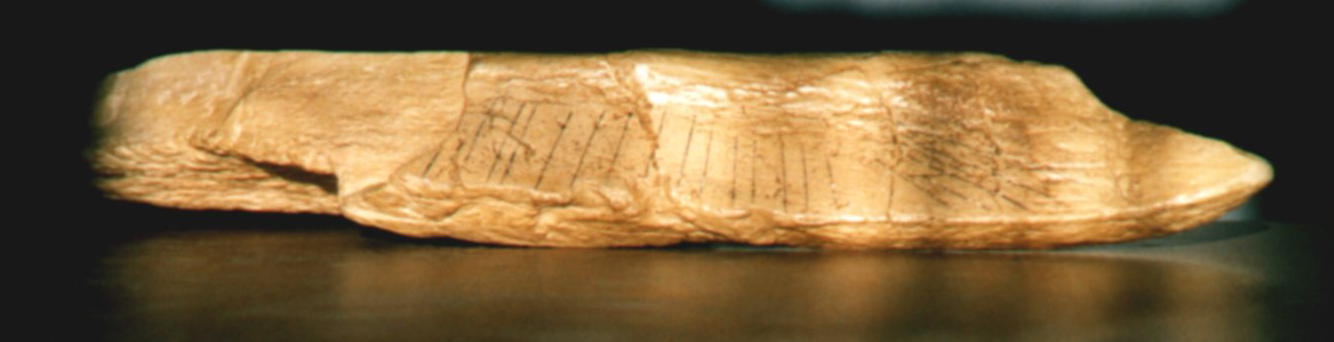
Tibia, dated between 400.000 and 350.000 years ago

One bone fragment, an elephant tibia, has two groups of 7 and 14 incised parallel lines and might represent an early example of art. The regular spacing of the incisions, their subequal lengths and V-like cross-sections suggest they were created at the same time, with a single stone tool. The tibia dates to between 350,000 and 400,000 years ago. The interpretation as an early calendar is a possibility.

== Structures ==
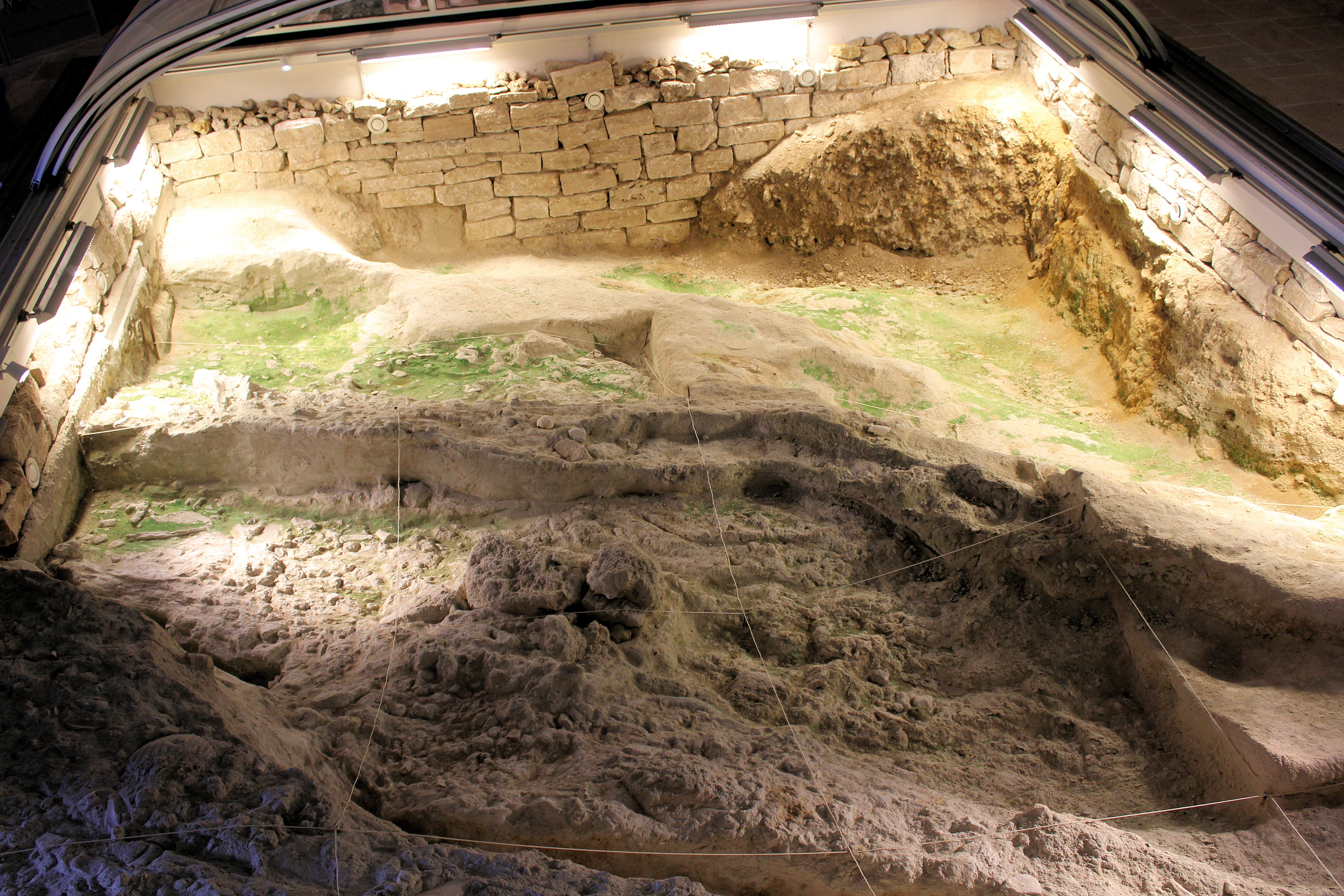
Bilzingsleben structure, possibly built by Homo heidelbergensis, 400–350.000 BCE

D. Mania found large stones arranged in a circular manner. He thought that it probably was a base for a dwelling. However, ring-center analysis showed that the site was an open air site. C. Gamble proposed that humans congregated at the site around the fire.
