= Mirjam Weichselbraun =

Austrian television host and actress (born 1981)

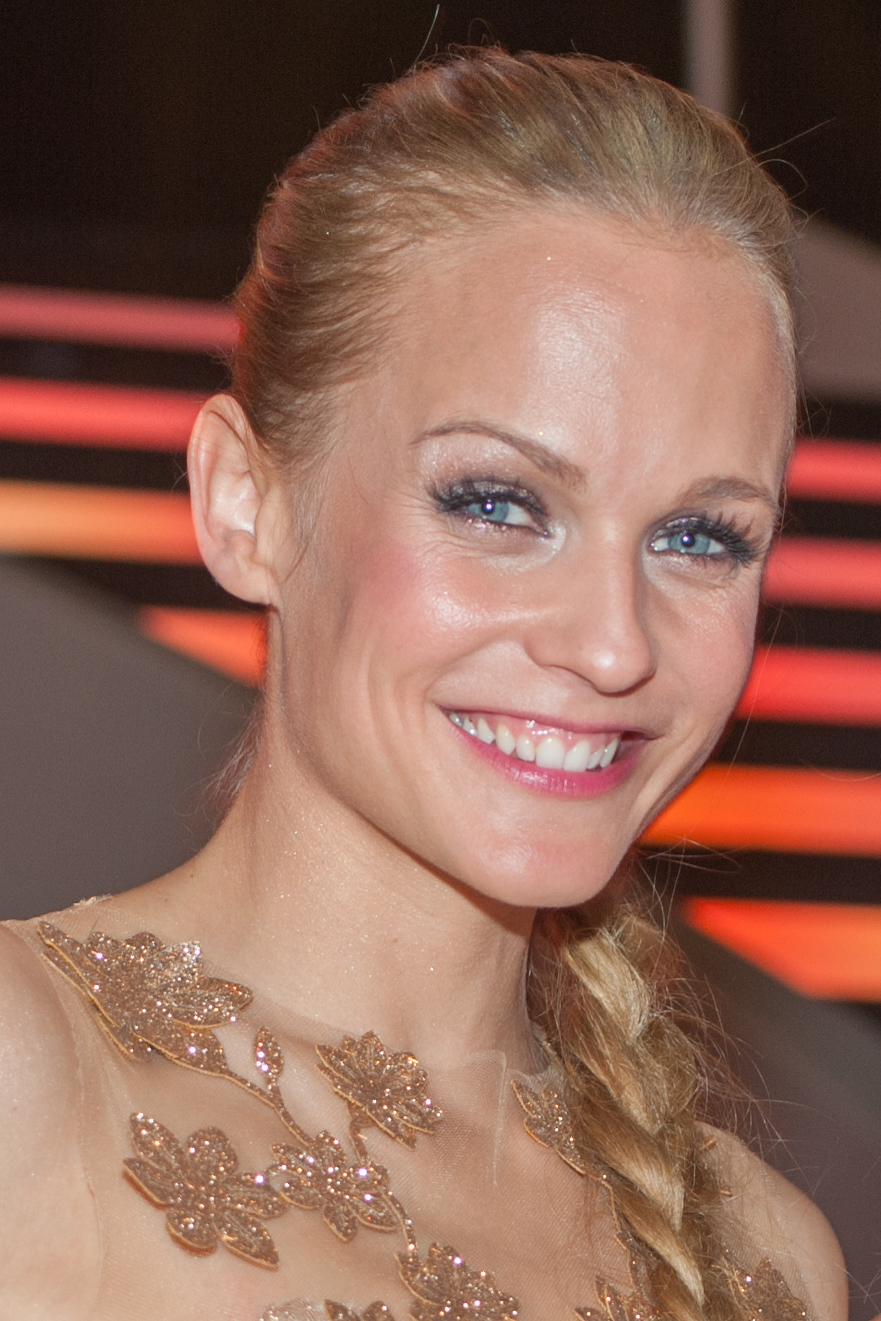
- Weichselbraun in 2016
- Born: 27 September 1981 (age 45); Innsbruck, Austria
- Occupations: Television presenter, actress
- Years active: 1999–present
- Known for: Hosting Dancing Stars, Life Ball and the Vienna Opera Ball
- Partner: Ben Mawson (2013–present)
- Children: 2
- Website: mirjamweichselbraun.com

Mirjam Weichselbraun (born 27 September 1981) is an Austrian television host and actress, best known in Austria for presenting Dancing Stars, Life Ball and the Vienna Opera Ball. She is best known, outside Austria and Germany, for co-presenting the Eurovision Song Contest in 2015.

== Career ==
In January 2002, she joined the newly started music channel VIVA PLUS in Cologne, where she hosted the show Cologne Day. After only eight months she switched to MTV Germany in Berlin where she hosted the live show MTV Select until January 2005. In Germany, she has interviewed some of the most famous artists in the music business including Jon Bon Jovi and Nickelback. She presented TRL Germany with Joko Winterscheidt (alternating with Patrice Bouédibéla and Karolin Oesterling) until April 2007.

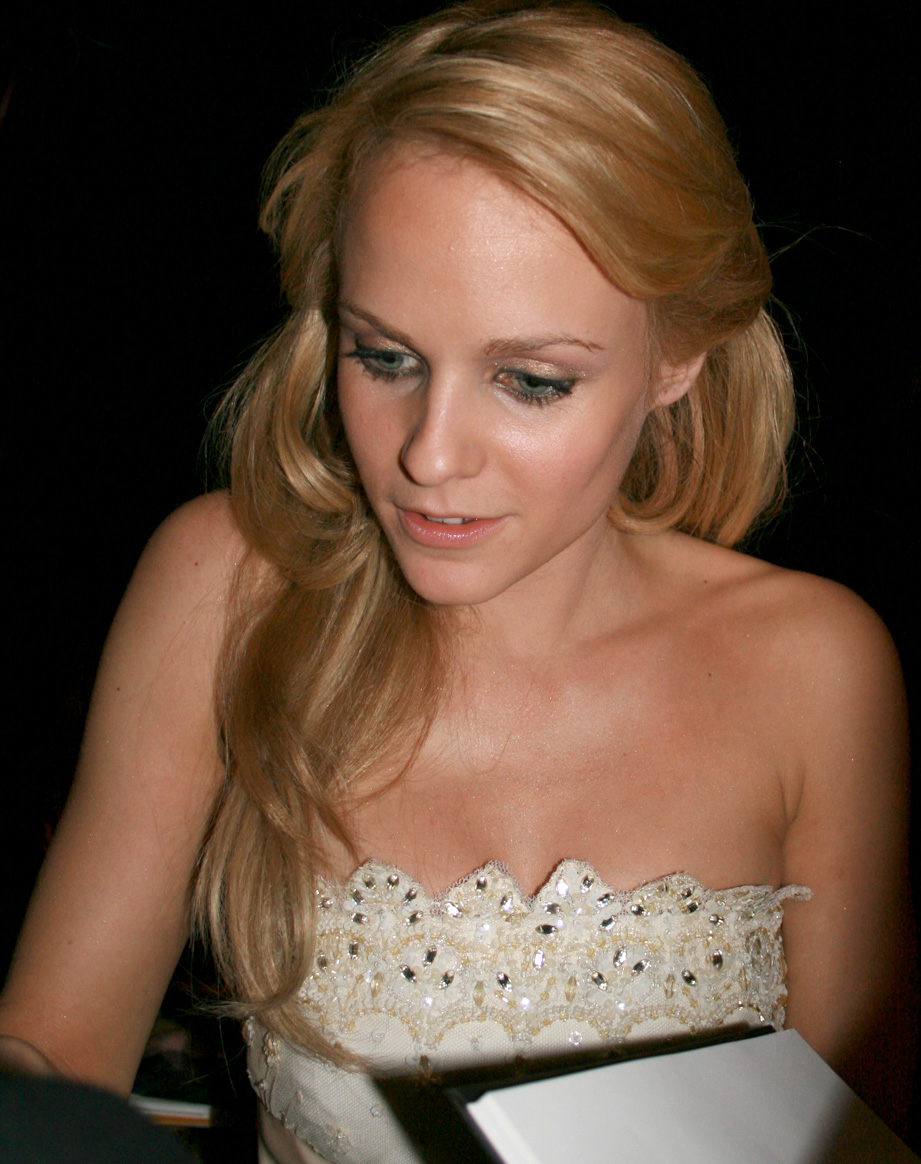
Weichselbraun at the 2008 Romy Awards

Since 2003, next to her job on MTV, she has also been hosting the ZDF online-magazine for the game show Wetten, dass..?. In 2004 she has, together with Christian Clerici, hosted the live show Expedition Österreich (Expedition Austria), and one year later the Austrian preliminaries for the Eurovision Song Contest 2005, as well as the dancing show Dancing Stars with Alfons Haider on ORF. Her hosting of Dancing Stars earned her the Austrian Romy television award in 2006 and 2008. In 2006, Weichselbraun and Wayne Carpendale presented the German version of Dancing on Ice on RTL, which made her very popular in Germany. Other hosting jobs include the Life Ball, Kiddy Contest, The Dome and the Romy awards presentation in 2008 and 2013.

In addition to her job as a show host, Weichselbraun has also lent her voice to Jan Dress' audio drama Letzte Tage, jetzt (Last days, now) and worked as an actress. In 2007 she played in the ORF movie Die Rosenkönigin and in one episode of the first season of Die ProSieben Märchenstunde (episode: Frau Holle – Im Himmel ist die Hölle los). In 2008 and 2009 she appeared in two more films: H3 – Halloween Horror Hostel and Hangtime. In 2009, she took the role of Sugar Kane in Peter Stones' musical Manche mögen's heiß (Some like it hot) at the Theater in der Josefstadt.

In 2015, Weichselbraun co-hosted the Eurovision Song Contest alongside Alice Tumler and Arabella Kiesbauer in Vienna. In 2021, she hosted the second season of The Masked Singer Austria for Channel Puls 4.

== Awards ==
- Romy Awards 2006: Special Jury Prize for Dancing Stars together with Alfons Haider
- 2007 and 2008: Top Spot Award ORF as advertising favourite of the year
- Leading Ladies Award 2008
- Romy Ceremony 2008: Romy as popular talk show host
- IPTV Award 2010: Viewership price for their backstage interviews Wetten, dass ..?
- Romy Ceremony 2011: Romy as a popular show entertainer
- Romy Awards 2012: Romy as a popular show entertainer along with Klaus Eberhartinger and diamond lapel ROMY
- 2015: Tyrolean of the Year

== Personal life ==
Weichselbraun has a twin sister. Their parents married late, so each girl could choose her own surname. Melanie Binder took her father's name, while Mirjam Weichselbraun took her mother's.

After a two year-relationship Weichselbraun split up with the singer Marque. She had also been in a relationship with the Sat.1 host Jahn Hahn, but they split after four years. Since 2013 she has been in a relationship with Ben Mawson, the manager of Lana Del Rey. She has two children with him, two daughters.

== Filmography ==
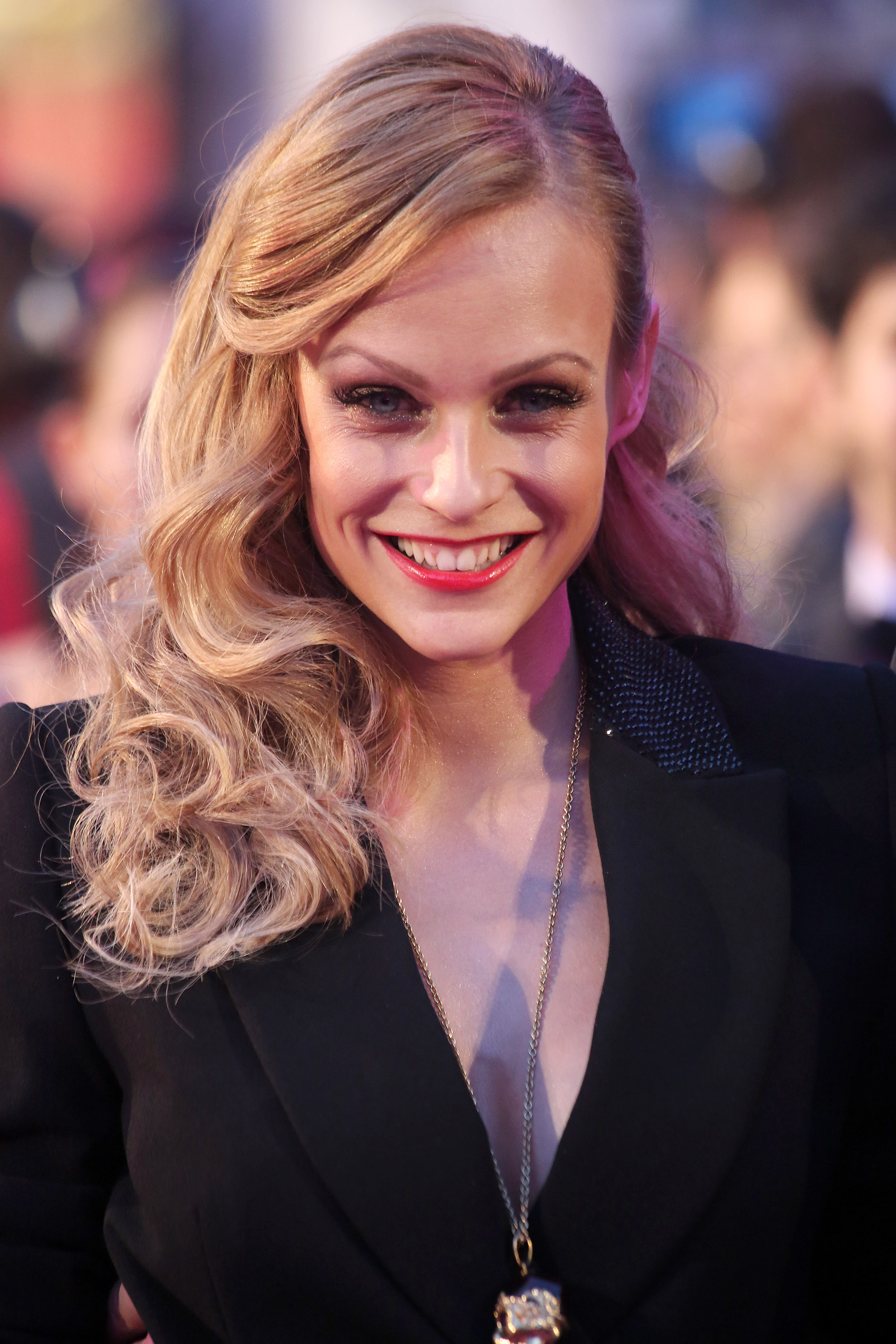
Weichselbraun at Life Ball 2013

=== Actress ===
Year	Title	Role	Notes
2007	Die Rosenkönigin	Marie Gruber	TV
2007	Die ProSieben Märchenstunde	Chantal	TV
2008	H3 – Halloween Horror Hostel	Sidney	TV
2008	Mutig in die neuen Zeiten – Alles anders	Agnes Ulmendorff	TV
2008	The Wall: The Final Days	Bonnie	TV
2009	Hangtime	Kathi	
2011	Das Traumhotel (Episode: Malediven)	Greta Junghans	TV
2012	Die Braut im Schnee	Dr. Thea Hollmann	TV
2012	Unter Umständen verliebt	Steffi	TV
2012	Es kommt noch dicker (Episodes: Ein magischer Tag, Der Tanzwettbewerb)	Ella Sandvoss	TV
2012	Wir sind Kaiser	Fifi	TV
2012	Lost in Borneo	Julia zu Hohenberg	TV
2013	Herztöne	Dutch Princess	TV
2013	Zweisitzrakete	Polizistin Sabrina	
2013	Zur Sache, Macho!	Lisa Rammser	TV

=== Dubbing ===
Year	Title	Role
2007	Bee Movie	Vanessa Bloom

=== Presenter ===
Year	Title	Channel	Role
2001	Das Magazin	TV Tirol	Presenter
2002	Cologne Day	VIVA Plus	Presenter
2002–2005	MTV Select	MTV Germany	Presenter
2002–2007	TRL Germany	MTV Germany	Co-presenter
2003–2012	Wetten, dass..?	ZDF	Online presenter
2004	Expedition Österreich	ORF1	Co-presenter
2005; 2007–2008; 2010–	Life Ball	ORF1	Co-presenter
2005	Song.Null.Fünf	ORF1	Co-presenter
2005–	Dancing Stars	ORF1	Co-presenter
2006	Dancing on Ice	RTL	Co-presenter
2007–2008	Kiddy Contest	ORF1	Presenter
2008, 2013, 2019	Romy Television Awards	ORF1	Host
2008–2010	The Dome	RTL2	Co-presenter
2010	Die Hit-Giganten	Sat.1	Co-presenter
2010–2012	Willkommen	ZDF	Co-presenter
2011–	Vienna Opera Ball	ORF eins	Co-presenter
2012–2013	Österreich rockt den Song Contest	ORF eins	Co-presenter
2012	Hast du Nerven?	ORF eins	Presenter
2012–2013	Die Harald Schmidt Show	Sky Deutschland	Sidekick
2013	Deutscher Filmpreis 2013	ZDF	Host
2014	Die Große Grillshow	ZDF	Co-presenter
2015	Wer singt für Österreich?	ORF eins	Presenter
2015	Eurovision Song Contest 2015	ORF eins	Co-presenter
2017	Echt jetzt?!	ORF eins	Co-presenter
2021	The Masked Singer Austria	Puls 4	Presenter
