= Zoltán Kiss =

Zoltán Kiss may refer to:

- Zoltán Kiss (musician), born 1980, member of Mnozil Brass since 2005
- Zoltán Kiss (footballer, born 1980), Hungarian footballer
- Zoltán Kiss (footballer, born 1986), Hungarian footballer
