= Bültzingslöwen =

German noble family

- noble family
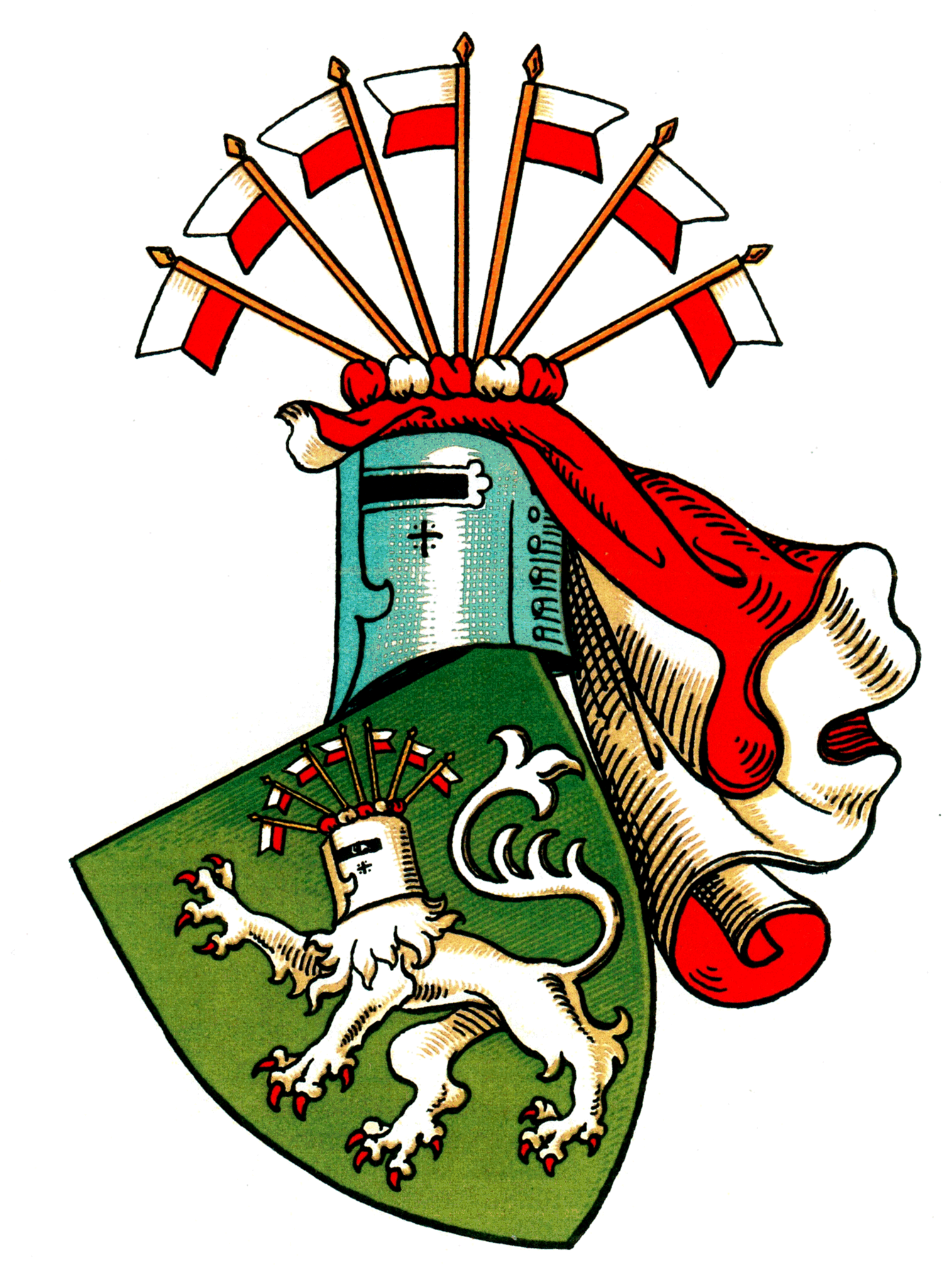
- Coat of Arms of the Bültzingslöwen
- Origin: Bilzingsleben, Duchy of Thuringia; Holy Roman Empire
- Cadet branches: Bültzingslöwen zu Haynrode (extinct); Bültzingslöwen zu Haynoder Mittelhöfer; Bültzingslöwen von Siebmacher; Bültzingslöwen von Bilzingsleben

The Bültzingslöwen family is a German noble family. The family is part of the Uradel, or ancient nobility, of Thuringia.

== History ==
The family originated from Bilzingsleben in the Duchy of Thuringia. One of the first mentions of the Bültzingslöwen family is of Hermann von Bultzingslowen in 1212. On 29 June 1216 it was recorded that another family member, Rodolphus de Buscingheleiben, served as a witness on the family will of Hermann I, Landgrave of Thuringia. Members of the family served as chief bailiffs of Eichsfeld. In 1381 the Archbishop of Mainz confirmed ownership of Worbis and Harburg to Siegfried VIII von Bültzingslöwen.

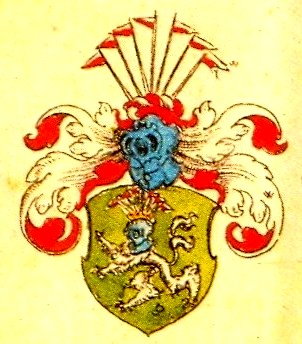
Bültzingsleben von Siebmacher coat of arms from 1605

== Notable family members ==
- Ferdinand von Bültzingslöwen, German military officer and geodesist
- Günther von Bültzingslöwen, German merchant and Dutch Army consul in Surabaya
- Hendrik von Bültzingslöwen, German actor
- Isabelle von Bueltzingsloewen, French historian
- Johann Friedrich Christian von Bültzingslöwen, officer and recipient of the Pour le Mérite
- Johanna von Bültzingslöwen, German writer
- Julius von Bültzingslöwen, Prussian major general
- Kurt von Bültzingslöwen, German doctor
- Mathilde von Bültzingslöwen, mother of Paula Modersohn-Becker
