= Sebastian Fuchsberger =

Austrian musician (born 1971)

Sebastian Fuchsberger (born 1971, in Salzburg) is an Austrian musician. He is a trombonist, tenor and yodeller, and a founding member of the Austrian jazz-folk band Global Kryner.

Originally from a musical family from Koppl near Salzburg, Fuchsberger studied the trombone from 1988 to 1996 at the Mozarteum in Salzburg (under Professors Unterberger, Küblböck and Josel) and attended courses by Branimir Slokar. From 1996 to 1997 he was engaged in the stage orchestra of the Vienna State Opera. As a trombonist, he has performed in concert with the Vienna Philharmonic Orchestra, the Vienna Symphony Orchestra, the Saint Petersburg Philharmonic Orchestra, the Vienna Radio Symphony Orchestra, the Vienna Volksoper, the Vienna Chamber Orchestra, the Klangforum Wien, the Camerata Academica Salzburg, the Wiener Taschenoper, the Janus Ensemble, Mund.Art, the Burgtheater, and bands such as the Vienna Art Orchestra, Max Nagel and the Alegre Correa Group.

From 1997 to 2002 he studied singing. As a tenor and "voice artist", he has worked with the Arnold Schönberg Choir and the choir of the Vienna State Opera, as a soloist in the Burgtheater, with the Inn District Symphony Orchestra, as well as with the bands Mnozil Brass, Global Kryner, Pro Brass, Alegre Corrêa, and Gansch & Roses.

From 1992 to 2005, he was a founding member of the brass-cabaret group Mnozil Brass, and has been with Global Kryner since April 2003. He appeared with Global Kryner in the semi-final of the Eurovision Song Contest 2005 in Kyiv (Ukraine), where his performance included yodelling. The band failed to qualify for the final.

Since 2013, Fuchsberger has sung mainly for the Leipzig Opera.
