= H3 – Halloween Horror Hostel =

2008 film

H3 – Halloween Horror Hostel is a 2008 German horror-parody television film, part of the TV series ProSieben Funny Movie. The film was directed by Michael Karen and written by Stefan Barth.

== Plot ==
During a cooking show, Tim Mälzer got repeated phone calls from a mysterious person, who asks for popcorn. After several calls Mälzer responds to the person, that threatened him to kill him, like he did it with the camera man. Mälzer looked for the camera man, but he had disappeared. Then the microwave rings and Mälzer opened it and found the camera man's head inside. After that a sentient Jigsaw puppet appeared, driving a small red car and asked again (enraged) for the popcorn.

In the same time the four friends Nico, Janine, Acki and Martin driving through a forest.

== Cast ==
- Alfonso Losa as Nico
- Jennifer Ulrich as Janin
- Axel Stein as Acki
- Hendrik von Bültzingslöwen as Martin
- Christian Tramitz as Harry
- Mike Krüger as Michael Meier
- Ivonne Schönherr as Ficky
- Anni Wendler as Paris
- Mirjam Weichselbraun as Sidney
- Holger C. Gotha as Vater von Sidney
- Santiago Ziesmer as Jigsaw (voice)

== Parodies ==
The movie contains many references and parodies of many known horror-thriller movies:

- Halloween - The main theme can be heard, when the four friends walking through the forest.
- Friday the 13th
- Hostel
- Dead End
- Saw - The Jigsaw puppet.
- The Ring
- Ju-on
- I Know What You Did Last Summer
- Scream
- 28 Weeks Later
- House of Wax - Letter animation at the beginning
- The Evil Dead - Camera drives
- Dawn of the Dead
- The Texas Chainsaw Massacre
- Freddy vs. Jason
- From Dusk till Dawn
- Donnie Darko - The smoking lookalike Donnie Darko rabbit scene
- E.T. the Extra-Terrestrial - Jigsaw puppet flies with his red car in front of shining moon.
- Harry Potter
- Michael Jackson's Thriller - The dance routine of the zombies, with the music

== Reception ==
A German review stated, ”A gruesome attempt at parodying the relevant film hits of the goosebump genre […] Subtle parodies dissect the genre with a scalpel. This cinematic absurdity, however, hits with a sledgehammer. And that's just ridiculous.” Filmdienst criticized the film for the same reason: ”An attempt at a slasher parody that grotesquely exaggerates the genre's clichés and stereotypes.” Another German very negative review found: ”Not a single successful parody, zero scares or gore, and the cringe puns are the final nail in the coffin.”
