= Hendrik von Bültzingslöwen =

German actor

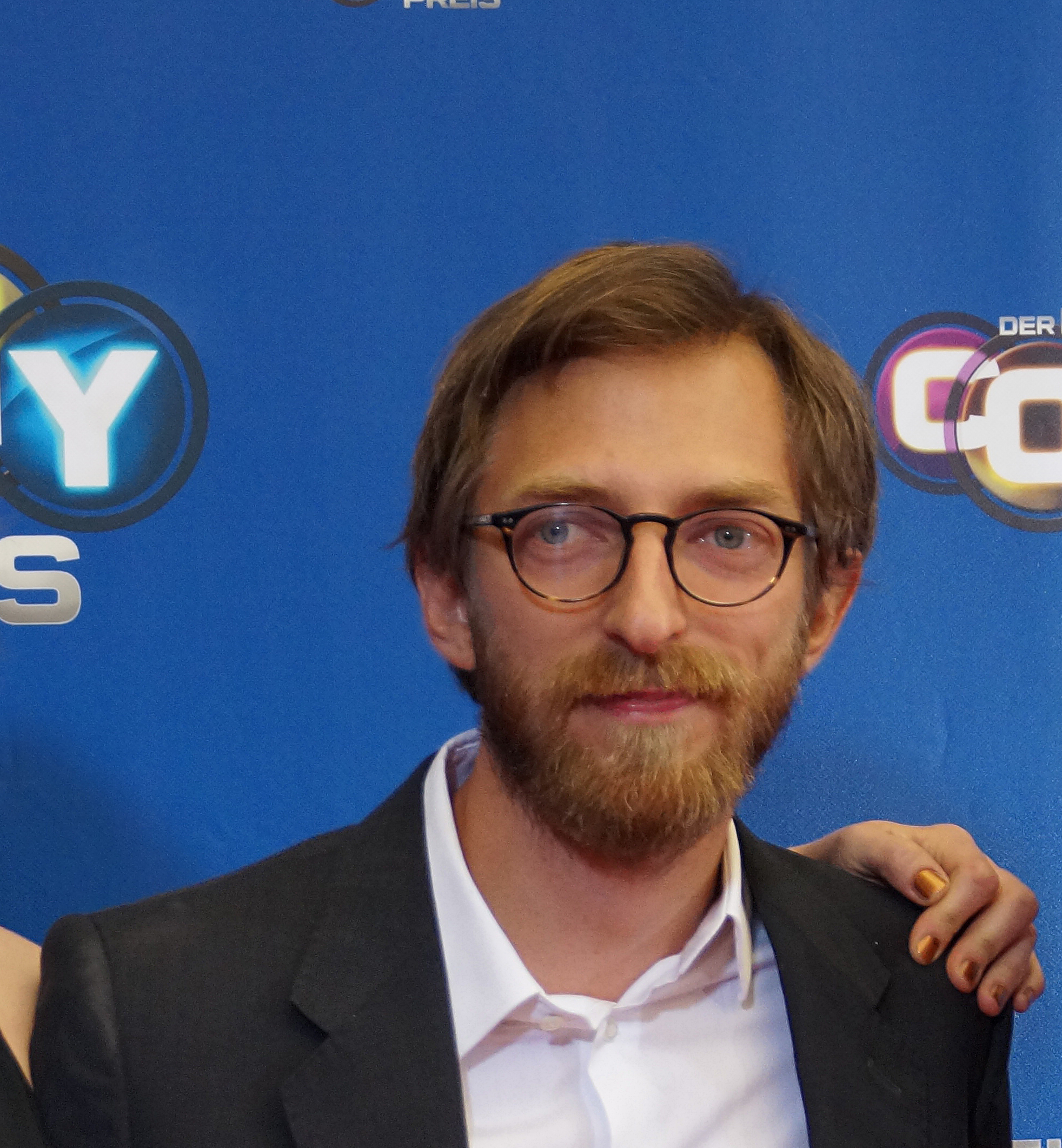
- Born: 16 June 1984 (age 40); Hamburg, West Germany
- Occupation: actor
- Website: Hendrikvonbueltzingsloewen.de

Hendrik von Bültzingslöwen (born 16 June 1984) is a German actor.

Von Bültzingslöwen was born in Hamburg, West Germany, in 1984. He is a member of the Bültzingslöwen family, which is part of the Thuringian nobility. He works as a film and television actor.

== Filmography ==
- 2006: big city robber (short film)
- 2007: A case for KBBG (short film)
- 2008: H3 – Halloween Horror Hostel
- 2009: Neues aus Büttenwarder
- 2009: The love and Viktor
- 2009: The waiting room
- 2009: Soul Kitchen
- 2011: Großstadtrevier (1 episode)
- 2011: SOKO Wismar (1 episode)
- 2011: Das Duo: Liebe und Tod
- 2012: Cheerful to deadly: Henker & Richter (1 episode)
- 2012: Alarm für Cobra 11 – Die Autobahnpolizei (1 episode)
- 2012: heart failure
- 2013: Turbo & Tacho (pilot film)
- 2014: Grand Budapest Hotel
- 2014: The unlikely events in the life of ...
- 2015: Sanctuary
- 2016: Tatort - Wrath of God
- 2016: Heldt (1 episode)
- 2017: jerks. (TV series, 10 episodes, supporting role as Jojo)
- 2017: Jürgen - Today is lived
- 2018: Wilsberg: Forecast murder
- 2018: SOKO Potsdam (TV series)
- 2017: Mata Hari - dance with death
- 2018: SOKO Cologne (TV series, episode: The Boule - Band e)
