= Isabelle von Bueltzingsloewen =

French historian (born 1964)

- Born: 1964 (age 61–62)
- Occupations: Historian, professor
- Employer: Lumière University Lyon 2
- Known for: History of public health and medical treatment
- Family: Bültzingslöwen (Thuringian noble family)

Isabelle von Bueltzingsloewen (born 1964) is a French historian. She specializes in the history of public health and medical treatment. She is a professor of contemporary history at the Lumière University Lyon 2. She is a member of the Bültzingslöwen family, a Thuringian noble family.

== Biography ==
A graduate of the ENS Fontenay-Saint-Cloud (1984 L), she earned her agrégation in history (1987) and her Ph.D. in history (1992) and a habilitated researcher (2007), she has been a professor of history and sociology of health at Lumière University Lyon 2 since 2010, having previously served as an associate professor at the same university since 1993. She is a member of the Rhône-Alpes Historical Research Laboratory (LARHRA, RESEA team). She was previously a member of the “Health/Welfare” research group at the Pierre-Léon Center for Economic and Social History (Lyon), which no longer exists.

After serving as Vice President for Research from 2016 to 2024, she became president of Lumière University Lyon 2 on July 5, 2024.
