= Mnozil Brass =

Austrian brass septet

Mnozil Brass is an Austrian brass septet. They play classical, jazz and other styles of music using traditional brass instruments and more unusual instruments such as the customized rotary valved trumpet and bass trumpet. Music is presented with a typical Austrian style of humour, which can be approximately characterized as "jet black" and "here and there" absurd. Elements of slapstick exist next to virtuosic brass playing. They are often popularly referred to as "The Monty Python of the musical world". Austrian and German schlager songs of the 20th century are often caricatured.

== History ==
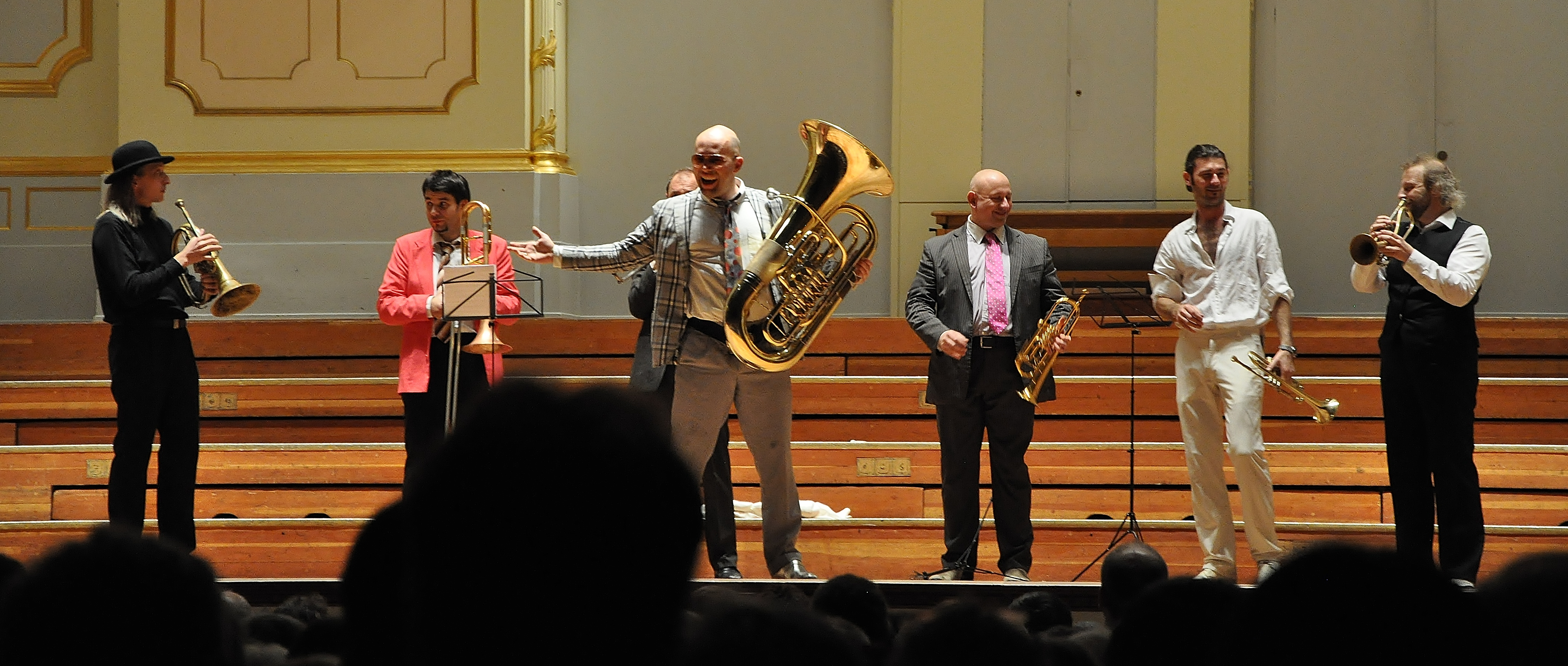
Mnozil Brass in Hamburg in 2012

All the founding members are graduates of the renowned Vienna College of Music, who met while playing at the Mnozil pub in Vienna's first inner-city district. The band was founded in 1992 although its first official outing was in 1993.

The septet cooperates with freelance director Bernd Jeschek who developed the stage programs "Smoke", "Ragazzi" and "Seven" and the "first operetta of the 21st century" titled "Das Trojanische Boot" ("The Trojan Boat"), whose world premiere was in 2005 during the German art festival RuhrTriennale.

The group has toured internationally and won praise from artists such as Barry Tuckwell, Chuck Findley, Jeff Nelson and Wycliffe Gordon.

== Members ==
- Thomas Gansch (trumpet)
- Robert Rother (trumpet)
- Roman Rindberger (trumpet) (since 2004)
- Leonhard Paul (trombone & bass trumpet)
- Gerhard Füßl (trombone)
- Zoltan Kiss (trombone) (since 2005)
- Wilfried Brandstötter (tuba)

== Former members ==
- Wolfgang Sohm (trumpet) until 2004
- Sebastian Fuchsberger (trombone) until 2004
- Ed Partyka (trombone) until 2005
- Albert Wieder (tuba) (Temporary replacement for Brandstötter in 2015–2016)

== Repertoire from Seven Show ==
Mnozil has a wide repertoire. Their two-hour-long concerts feature the group playing all manners of music, always without sheet music, along with comedic antics and sketchlike parts. While the majority of items feature the band playing their brass instruments, they incorporate other instruments such as the recorder, as well as singing ("Bohemian Rhapsody" being a key example).

Genres include Austrian drinking and folk songs, jazz, pop, rearrangements of classical pieces, movie soundtracks and schlager.

== See also ==
- List of Bohemian Rhapsody cover versions
- Music of Austria
