= Bilzingsleben =

- Ortsteil of Kindelbrück
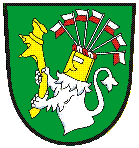
- Coat of arms
- Interactive map of Bilzingsleben
- Location within Germany Location within Thuringia
- Coordinates: 51°16′52″N 11°4′7″E
- Country: Germany
- State: Thuringia
- District: Sömmerda
- Municipality: Kindelbrück

Area
  - Total: 16.85 km^{2} (6.51 sq mi)
- Elevation: 150 m (490 ft)

Population (2017-12-31)
  - Total: 669
  - Density: 39.7/km^{2} (103/sq mi)
- Time zone: UTC+01:00 (CET)
  - Summer (DST): UTC+02:00 (CEST)
- Postal codes: 06578
- Dialling codes: 036375
- Vehicle registration: SÖM
- Website: www.bilzingsleben.de

Bilzingsleben (German pronunciation: [ˈbɪltsɪŋsˌleːbn̩]) is a village and a former municipality in the Sömmerda district of Thuringia, Germany. Since 1 January 2019, it is part of the municipality Kindelbrück. The village takes their coat of arms from the Bültzingslöwen, an ancient noble family that originated there.
