= Global Kryner =

Austrian folk group

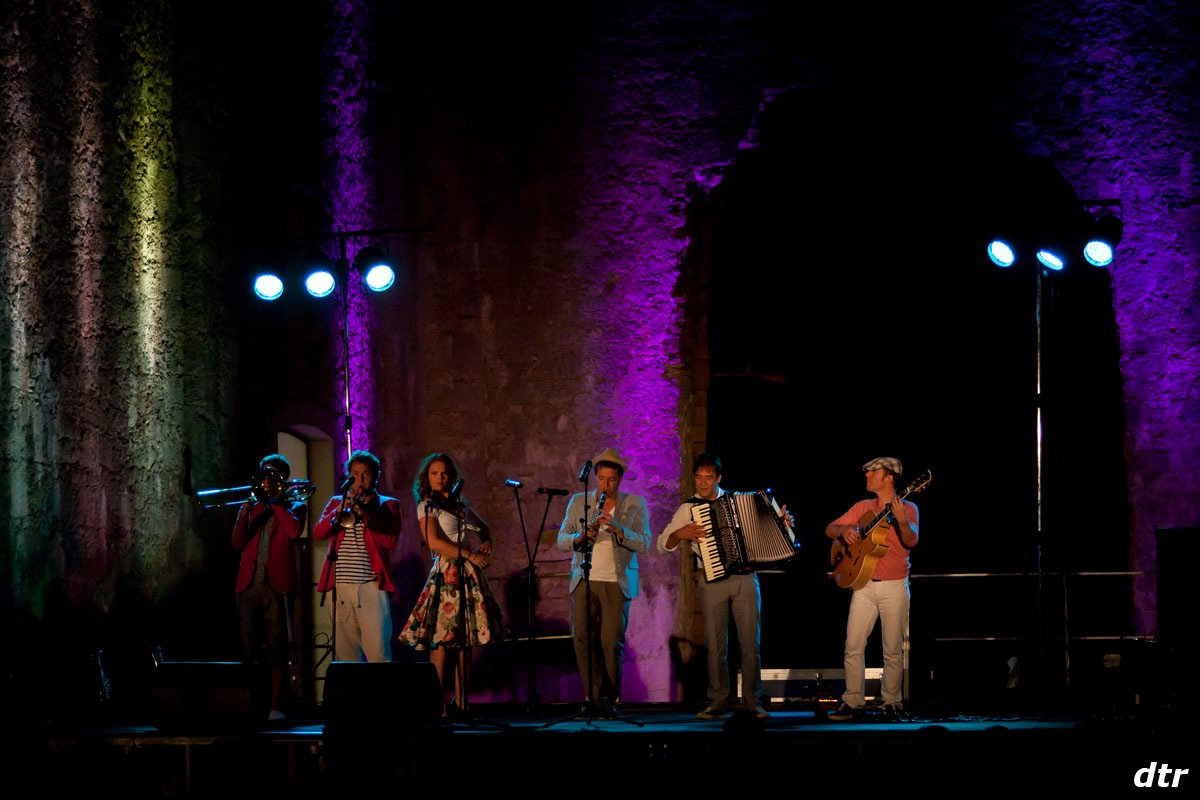

Background information
- Years active: 2003–2013

Global Kryner were a six-piece Austrian folk group, consisting of clarinet player Christof Spörk, bass trombonist, tenor and yodeller Sebastian Fuchsberger, guitarist Edi Koehldorfer, trumpet player Karl Rossmann, accordion player Anton Sauprügl, and jazz vocalist Sabine Stieger. The group has won numerous awards in Germany and Austria, and represented Austria in the Eurovision Song Contest 2005 in Kyiv, Ukraine.

== Eurovision Song Contest 2005 ==
Global Kryner were the first band to perform in the semi-final of the Eurovision Song Contest 2005, opening the show, but did not receive enough televotes to progress to the final, coming 21st out of 25 countries. Due to this poor result for the band, the Austrian national broadcaster ORF announced its withdrawal from the Eurovision Song Contest, releasing a statement describing it as "an absurd competition in which Austrian musical tradition means nothing". However, after a one-year break, Austria returned to the contest in 2007.

== Discography ==
- Global Kryner, April 2004
- Krynology, May 2005
- Weg, January 2008
- Live in Luxembourg, January 2009
- Global Kryner versus The Rounder Girls, January 2010

Preceded by Tie Break with "Du bist"	Austria in the Eurovision Song Contest; 2005	Succeeded by Eric Papilaya with "Get a Life – Get Alive"
