= Marque (musician) =

Austrian pop musician

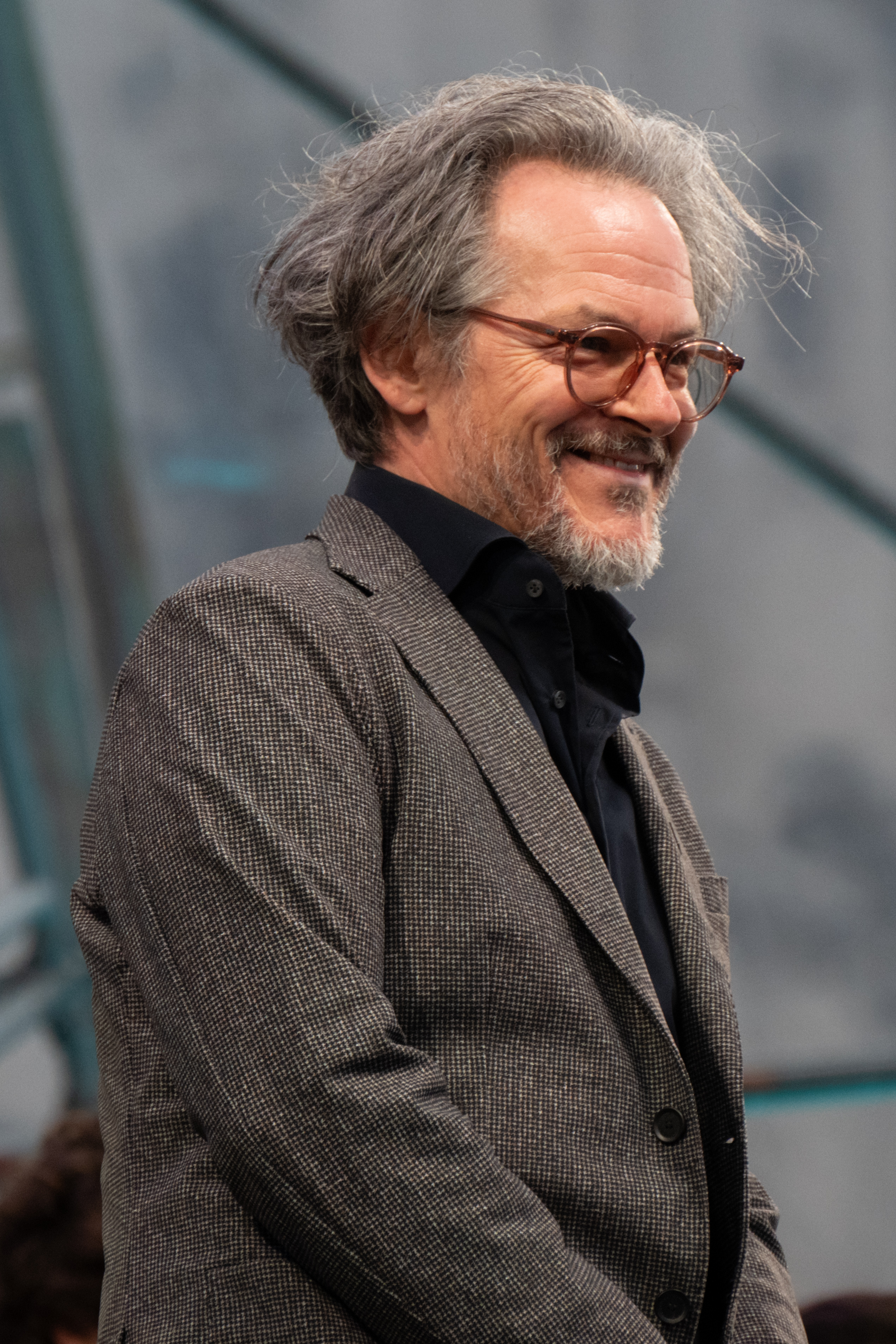
Marque (2025)

Marque (born Marcus Nigsch) is an Austrian pop artist. He has released albums on the Polydor (1995–1997) and Edel Music (2000) labels. In 2000 he had two top-five singles in the Austrian charts.

== Discography ==
List of lead singles
Title	Year	Peak chart positions							Album
Title	Year	AUT	EU	GER	GSA	NLD		SWI	Album
Title	Year	AUT	EU	GER	GSA	40	100	SWI	Album
"Something In My Eyes"	1995	—	—	78	—	—	—	—	Wanna Make Love To You
"She Walks"	1997	—	—	—	—	—	—	—	Fonkononia
"Charlies Letter"	1997	—	—	—	—	—	—	—	Fonkononia
"Show You How to Dream"	1997	—	—	—	—	—	—	—	Fonkononia
"One To Make Her Happy"	2000	3	31	14	12	69	37	26	Freedomland
"Electronic Lady"	2000	5	—	32	—	—	—	89	Freedomland
"River"	2000	—	—	—	—	—	—	—	Freedomland
"Rose Without A Thorn"	2001	49	—	85	—	—	—	—	Transparent
"Wonderman"	2002	57	—	61	—	—	—	—	Pirate Of My Soul
"Two More Lonely People"	2002	—	—	—	—	—	—	—	Pirate Of My Soul
"The Reason Why"	2003	—	—	—	—	—	—	—	Pirate Of My Soul
"Superstar"	2004	—	—	—	—	—	—	—	Pirate Of My Soul
"Sorry But I Wonder"	2004	—	—	—	—	—	—	—	Pirate Of My Soul
"—" denotes a recording that did not chart.
