= Romania in the Eurovision Song Contest 2006 =

- Eurovision Song Contest 2006
- Participating broadcaster: Televiziunea Română (TVR)
- Country: Romania
- Selection process: Selecția Națională 2006
- Selection date: 26 February 2006

Competing entry
- Song: "Tornerò"
- Artist: Mihai Trăistariu
- Songwriters: Eduard Cîrcotă; Mihaela Deac; Cristian Hriscu

Placement
- Final result: 4th, 172 points

Participation chronology

Romania was represented at the Eurovision Song Contest 2006 with the song "Tornerò", written by Eduard Cîrcotă, Mihaela Deac, and Cristian Hriscu, and performed by Mihai Trăistariu. The Romanian participating broadcaster, Televiziunea Română (TVR), held the national final Selecția Națională 2006 in February 2006 to select its entry for the contest. Controversy surrounded the event, as seventh-placed duo Indiggo accused TVR of vote rigging.

Prior to Eurovision, "Tornerò" was promoted by a music video, live performances, radio submissions and fellow endeavours in several countries. Romania ultimately reached fourth place in the contest's final on 20 May, achieving 172 points. This remained the country's highest score until 2017. During Romania's show, Trăistariu was accompanied by dance group Big Bounce who performed a mixture of ballet and contemporary dance onstage. Following Eurovision, "Tornerò" achieved commercial success, reaching the top ten in Finland and Greece.

== Background ==
Prior to the 2006 contest, Televiziunea Română (TVR) had participated in the Eurovision Song Contest representing Romania eight times since its first entry in 1994. Its highest placing in the contest had been third place, achieved in 2005 with "Let Me Try" performed by Luminița Anghel and Sistem.

== Before Eurovision ==
=== Selecția Națională 2006 ===
TVR organized Selecția Națională 2006, a competition to select its entrant for the Eurovision Song Contest 2006. In early February 2006, the broadcaster published a provisory list of songs shortlisted to compete in the two semi-finals of Selecția Națională on 24 and 25 February:

Competing entries in Selecția Națională 2006
| Artist | Song | Songwriter(s) |
|---|---|---|
| Akcent and Nico | "Jokero" | Adi Colceru; Marius Nedelcu; Adrian Sînă |
| Laurențiu Cazan | "I Believe in My Stars" | Laurențiu Cazan |
| Delia | "Baby" | Umberto Tomassi |
| Delia | "Gândești prea high" | Umberto Tomassi |
| Dora | "Brand New Feeling" | Jamie Winchester; Mihai Alexandru; Marc Paelinck |
| Marius Dragomir | "Porque te vas" | Marius Dragomir |
| ~~Edict~~ | ~~"Vine Badea"~~ | Valeriu Cotoroga; Margareta Iorovi; Anatolie Neagu |
| Gașca de Acasă | "Lumea asta nu-i a mea" | Gașca de Acasă |
| Gina Pop Band | "Give Me a Sign" | Gina Pop; Jimi Laco |
| Gina Pop Band | "Hey a Hey" | Robert Ilie |
| Dragoș Grigorescu | "No One Lives Forever" | Dragoș Grigorescu |
| Indiggo | "Be My Boyfriend" | Dieter Bohlen; Indiggo |
| Jasmine | "Sunshine" | Adrian Cristescu; Silviu Paduraru |
| Linda | "Se tu vuoi" | Daniele Loreti; Linda Valori; Paul Nancă; Max Carlo; Dez Durhan |
| Maria Magdalena Dănăilă | "Nu mă uita" | Maria Magdalena Dănăilă |
| MiDo | "Sagapo" | Mircea Romcescu |
| Sorin Mitrea | "This Is My Name" | Dani Alexandrescu; Radu Fornea; Mircea Presel; Sorin Mitrea |
| Tony Poptămaș and Desperado | "The Universe" | Tony Poptămaș |
| Maria Radu and Mike Peterson | "It's Our World" | Radu Drăgănescu |
| Space Ville | "United Heavens" | Mihai Ogăşanu; Ioana Sihota |
| Mihai Trăistariu | "Tornerò" | Cristian Hriscu; Mihaela Deac; Eduard Cîrcotă |
| Trrafic | "I Want You Back" | Alin Lupsa; Remus Carteleanu |

Although selected to progress to the semi-finals of Selecția Națională, Edict's "Vine Badea" was eventually disqualified from the contest due to the song having received television and radio airplay in Moldova prior to TVR's cutoff date of 1 October 2005. Additionally, the initially submitted entries "Lacrima ta" by Paula Seling and Marcel Marza, "I Believe in Love" by Mike Peterson, "Reeditarea succesului" by Sistem, "Sentiment" by Blondy, and "Dragoste în univers" by Heaven were voluntarily withdrawn by the performers; TVR appointed replacement songs. The results of the semi-finals were:

Qualifier

Semi-final 1 – 24 February 2006
| R/O | Artist | Song | Jury | Televote | | Total | Place |
| R/O | Artist | Song | Jury | Votes | Points | Total | Place |
|---|---|---|---|---|---|---|---|
| 1 | Maria Magdalena Dănăilă | "Nu mă uita" | 4 | 609 | 6 | 10 | 7 |
| 2 | Maria Radu and Mike Peterson | "It's Our World" | 10 | 555 | 4 | 14 | 2 |
| 3 | MiDo | "Sagapo" | 8 | 359 | 3 | 11 | 6 |
| 4 | Trrafic | "I Want You Back" | 6 | 260 | 1 | 7 | 9 |
| 5 | Akcent and Nico | "Jokero" | 12 | 4,410 | 12 | 24 | 1 |
| 6 | Gina Pop Band | "Hey a Hey" | 7 | 567 | 5 | 12 | 4 (Note: It is unknown which song placed over the other.) |
| 7 | Delia | "Gândești prea high" | 2 | 990 | 10 | 12 | 4 |
| 8 | Space Ville | "United Heavens" | 3 | 358 | 2 | 5 | 10 |
| 9 | Dragoș Grigorescu | "No One Lives Forever" | 1 | 690 | 7 | 8 | 8 |
| 10 | Indiggo | "Be My Boyfriend" | 5 | 897 | 8 | 13 | 3 |

Detailed Jury Votes
| R/O | Song | Juror | | | | | Total |
| R/O | Song | 1 | 2 | 3 | 4 | 5 | Total |
|---|---|---|---|---|---|---|---|
| 1 | "Nu mă uita" | 5 | 3 | 5 | 7 | 4 | 24 |
| 2 | "It's Our World" | 8 | 7 | 7 | 12 | 7 | 41 |
| 3 | "Sagapo" | 6 | 6 | 8 | 8 | 10 | 38 |
| 4 | "I Want You Back" | 7 | 8 | 4 | 5 | 8 | 32 |
| 5 | "Jokero" | 12 | 12 | 12 | 10 | 12 | 58 |
| 6 | "Hey a Hey" | 10 | 5 | 10 | 4 | 5 | 34 |
| 7 | "Gândești prea high" | 4 | 2 | 1 | 2 | 1 | 10 |
| 8 | "United Heavens" | 3 | 4 | 3 | 3 | 2 | 15 |
| 9 | "No One Lives Forever" | 2 | 1 | 2 | 1 | 3 | 9 |
| 10 | "Be My Boyfriend" | 1 | 10 | 6 | 6 | 6 | 29 |

Semi-final 2 – 25 February 2006
| R/O | Artist | Song | Jury | Televote | | Total | Place |
| R/O | Artist | Song | Jury | Votes | Points | Total | Place |
|---|---|---|---|---|---|---|---|
| 1 | Laurențiu Cazan | "I Believe in My Star" | 12 | 649 | 5 | 17 | 2 |
| 2 | Dora | "Brand New Feeling" | 7 | 854 | 7 | 14 | 3 |
| 3 | Gina Pop Band | "Give Me a Sign" | 6 | 388 | 0 | 6 | 8 |
| 4 | Linda | "Se tu vuoi" | 8 | 620 | 3 | 11 | 6 |
| 5 | Delia | "Baby" | 2 | 522 | 2 | 4 | 10 |
| 6 | Tony Poptămaș and Desperado | "The Universe" | 4 | 1211 | 10 | 14 | 3 |
| 7 | Sorin Mitrea | "This Is My Time" | 0 | 764 | 6 | 6 | 8 |
| 8 | Jasmine | "Sunshine" | 5 | 979 | 8 | 13 | 5 |
| 9 | Marius Dragomir | "Porque te vas" | 3 | 624 | 4 | 7 | 7 |
| 10 | Gașca de Acasă | "Lumea asta nu-i a mea" | 1 | 414 | 1 | 2 | 11 |
| 11 | Mihai Trăistariu | "Tornerò" | 10 | 5,222 | 12 | 22 | 1 |

Detailed Jury Votes
| R/O | Song | Juror | | | | | Total |
| R/O | Song | 1 | 2 | 3 | 4 | 5 | Total |
|---|---|---|---|---|---|---|---|
| 1 | "I Believe in My Star" | 10 | 10 | 12 | 10 | 12 | 54 |
| 2 | "Brand New Feeling" | 8 | 7 | 10 | 5 | 7 | 37 |
| 3 | "Give Me a Sign" | 5 | 6 | 6 | 6 | 6 | 29 |
| 4 | "Se te vuoi" | 7 | 8 | 7 | 8 | 10 | 40 |
| 5 | "Baby" | 2 | 3 | 3 | 2 | 1 | 11 |
| 6 | "The Universe" | 4 | 4 | 4 | 3 | 5 | 20 |
| 7 | "This Is My Time" | 0 | 0 | 0 | 0 | 0 | 0 |
| 8 | "Sunshine" | 6 | 5 | 5 | 4 | 4 | 24 |
| 9 | "Porque te vas" | 1 | 1 | 2 | 7 | 3 | 14 |
| 10 | "Lumea asta nu-i a mea" | 3 | 2 | 1 | 1 | 2 | 9 |
| 11 | "Tornerò" | 12 | 12 | 8 | 12 | 8 | 52 |

Having also been hired for the semi-finals, Luminița Anghel and Cătălin Măruță hosted the final of Selecția Națională on 26 February 2006. The winning song was determined by a 50/50 combination of votes from a jury panel and a public televote. The jury consisted of music professionals Ionel Tudor, Mirela Fugaru, Cristian Faur, Mălina Olinescu, Mircea Dragan, Marius Moga and Titus Andrei. "Tornerò" by Mihai Trăistariu won Selecția Națională 2006 with a total of 22 points, consisting of ten awarded by the public (7,852 televotes) and 12 by the jury. The full results were:

Final – 26 February 2006
| Artist | Song | Jury | Televote | | Total | Place |
| Artist | Song | Jury | Votes | Points | Total | Place |
|---|---|---|---|---|---|---|
| Mihai Trăistariu | "Tornerò" | 12 | 7,852 | 10 | 22 | 1 |
| Akcent and Nico | "Jokero" | 8 | 8,007 | 12 | 20 | 2 |
| Dora | "Brand New Feeling" | 6 | 1,327 | 7 | 13 | 3 |
| Laurențiu Cazan | "I Believe in My Star" | 7 | 831 | 5 | 12 | 4 |
| Tony Poptămaș and Desperado | "The Universe" | 4 | 2,454 | 8 | 12 | 5 |
| Linda | "Se tu vuoi" | 10 | 457 | 0 | 10 | 6 |
| Indiggo | "Be My Boyfriend" | 0 | 1,166 | 6 | 6 | 7 |
| Maria Radu and Mike Peterson | "It's Our World" | 2 | 570 | 3 | 5 | 8 |
| Jasmine | "Sunshine" | 5 | 440 | 0 | 5 | 9 |
| Gina Pop Band | "Hey a Hey" | 3 | 468 | 1 | 4 | 10 |
| Delia | "Gândești prea high" | 0 | 800 | 4 | 4 | 11 |
| MiDo | "Sagapo" | 1 | 547 | 2 | 3 | 12 |

==== Indiggo controversy ====
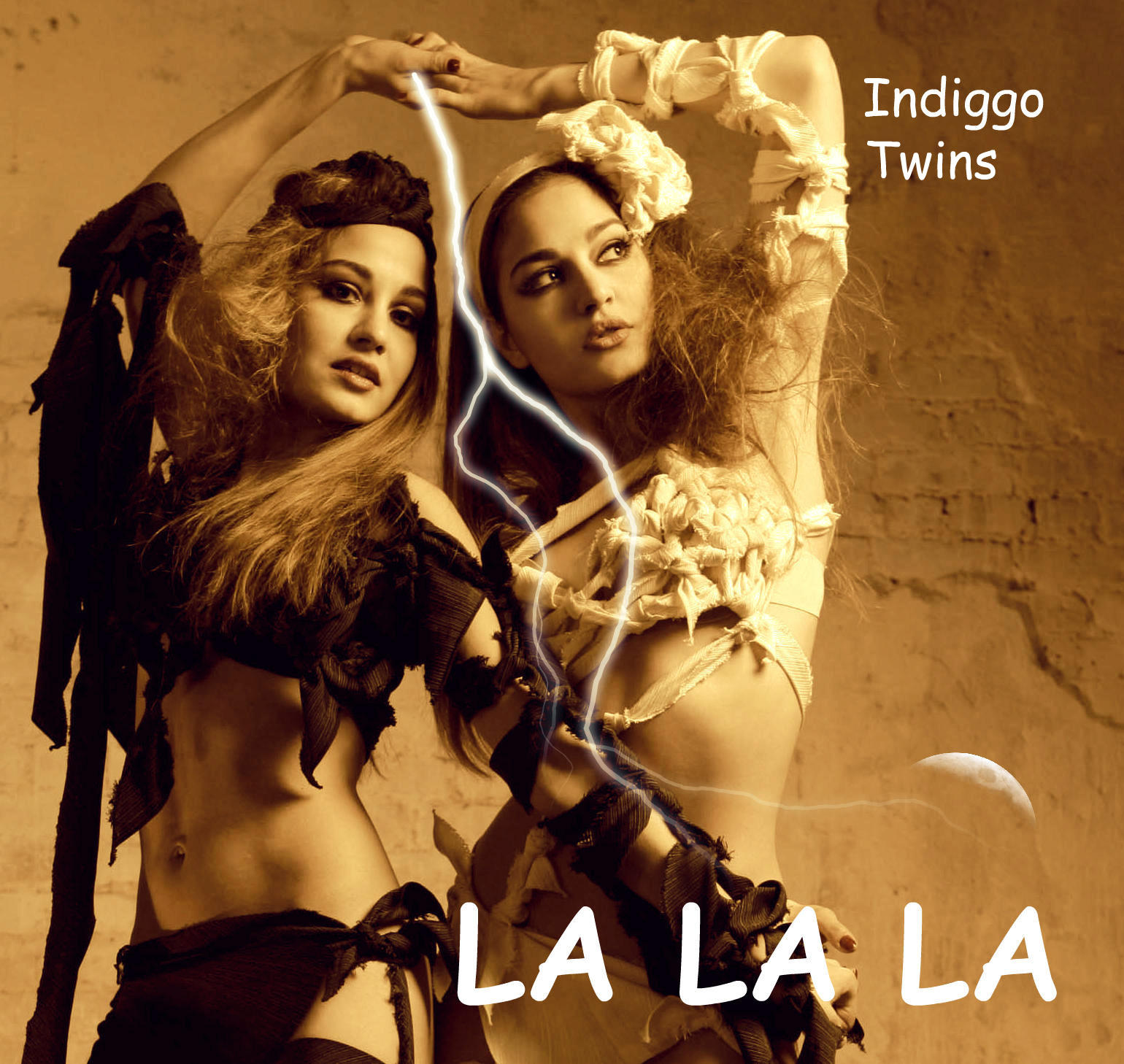
Seventh-placed Romanian-American duo Indiggo (pictured in 2011) caused controversy upon accusing TVR of vote rigging.

In a late-night talk show following the announcement of the winner, seventh-placed duo Indiggo accused TVR of vote rigging. Threatening with a €100,000 lawsuit, they based the accusation on reports that their voting line was continuously busy preventing people from voting for them when they called. TVR and the collaborating firm Voxline Communication dismissed the claims and stated that vote fraud was "impossible". Indiggo's "Be My Boyfriend" was removed from a CD of all Selecția Națională entries released by TVR.

=== Promotion ===
For promotional purposes, Trăistariu performed "Tornerò" on several occasions alongside other endeavours. Starting from 20 April 2006, he conducted a tour in 14 countries, including Malta, France, Greece, Cyprus, Monaco, Spain, Germany, Belgium, Croatia, Slovenia, Bulgaria and Moldova. This was preceded by a national tour sponsored by Cosmote, which commenced on 7 April and covered ten Romanian cities. "Tornerò" and its remixes were sent to radio stations and received airplay in several countries before the Eurovision Song Contest. Further promotion was done by Ralph Siegel's Jupiter Records in German-speaking Europe. A music video for "Tornerò" was released in 2006 and included on an enhanced CD release of the single that year. With costs for the clip amounting to a reported €50,000, it features Trăistariu walking in a hallway with dancers and other people, occasionally interacting with them and joining their activities.

== At Eurovision ==
The Eurovision Song Contest 2006 took place at the O.A.C.A. Olympic Indoor Hall in Athens, Greece and consisted of one semi-final on 18 May, and the final on 20 May 2006. In Romania, the show was broadcast on TVR, with Dan Manoliu as the country's head of delegation. Trăistariu was scheduled for a technical rehearsal on 15 May 2006, which saw various changes concerning the staging being made. A reported €160,000 was allocated for his live performance. Over the course of the preparations, several dancers were fired and replaced.

According to the Eurovision rules at the time, selected countries, except the host nation and the "Big Four" (France, Germany, Spain and the United Kingdom), were required to qualify from the semi-final to compete for the final; the top ten countries from the semi-final progressed to the final. In 2006, Romania automatically qualified to the final due to their top 11 result the 2005 contest. On the occasion, Trăistariu performed in 12th place, preceded by Macedonia and followed by Bosnia and Herzegovina. Onstage, Trăistariu was accompanied by three male and two female dancers of dance group Big Bounce. Their choreography was done by CRBL and contained elements of ballet and contemporary dance.

=== Voting ===
Below is a breakdown of points awarded to Romania in the final, as well as by the country in the semi-final and final of the contest. On the latter occasion, Romania finished in fourth position, being awarded 172 points, including 12 by Moldova and Spain, and ten from Cyprus, Israel, Malta, and Portugal. The only countries that didn't award the Romanian entry any points were Monaco and the Netherlands. This remained Romania's highest score until the introduction of a new voting system in 2016. The country awarded its 12 points to Bosnia and Herzegovina and Moldova in the semi-final and final of the contest, respectively. TVR appointed Andreea Marin Bănică as its spokesperson to announce the Romanian voting results.

==== Points awarded to Romania ====
Points awarded to Romania (Final)
| Score | Country |
|---|---|
| 12 points | Moldova; Spain |
| 10 points | Cyprus; Israel; Malta; Portugal |
| 8 points | |
| 7 points | France; Greece |
| 6 points | Denmark; Finland; Ireland; Sweden; United Kingdom |
| 5 points | Croatia; Germany; Slovenia |
| 4 points | Armenia; Estonia; Norway; Russia; Serbia and Montenegro |
| 3 points | Andorra; Belarus; Poland; Turkey |
| 2 points | Albania; Belgium; Bosnia and Herzegovina; Bulgaria; Iceland; Latvia; Macedonia |
| 1 point | Lithuania; Switzerland; Ukraine |

==== Points awarded by Romania ====
Points awarded by Romania (Semi-final)
| Score | Country |
|---|---|
| 12 points | Bosnia and Herzegovina |
| 10 points | Turkey |
| 8 points | Ukraine |
| 7 points | Russia |
| 6 points | Sweden |
| 5 points | Finland |
| 4 points | Cyprus |
| 3 points | Lithuania |
| 2 points | Armenia |
| 1 point | Macedonia |

Points awarded by Romania (Final)
| Score | Country |
|---|---|
| 12 points | Moldova |
| 10 points | Greece |
| 8 points | Russia |
| 7 points | Bosnia and Herzegovina |
| 6 points | Turkey |
| 5 points | Sweden |
| 4 points | Finland |
| 3 points | Ukraine |
| 2 points | Ireland |
| 1 point | Armenia |
