= Russia in the Eurovision Song Contest 2006 =

- Eurovision Song Contest 2006
- Country: Russia
- Selection process: Internal selection
- Announcement date: 7 March 2006

Competing entry
- Song: "Never Let You Go"
- Artist: Dima Bilan
- Songwriters: Alexandr Lunyov; Karen Kavaleryan; Irina Antonyan

Placement
- Semi-final result: Qualified (3rd, 217 points)
- Final result: 2nd, 248 points

Participation chronology

Russia was represented at the Eurovision Song Contest 2006 with the song "Never Let You Go", written by Alexandr Lunyov, Karen Kavaleryan, and Irina Antonyan, and performed by Dima Bilan. The Russian entry was selected internally by the Russian broadcaster Channel One Russia (C1R). At the contest, Russia qualified from the semi-final and placed 2nd in the final, scoring 248 points. This 2nd place, alongside the 2nd place of Alsou in 2000, was the best result of Russia until 2008.

== Before Eurovision ==
=== Internal selection ===
On 26 January 2006, C1R announced a submission period for interested artists and composers to submit their entries until 1 March 2006. A jury panel evaluated the received submissions on 7 March 2006 and selected the Russian entry. The jury consisted of Konstantin Ernst (general manager of C1R), Yuriy Aksyuta (music director of C1R), Ilya Bachurin (vice president of MTV Russia), Alexander Polesitskiy (general director of Europa Plus), Vladimir Matetsky (singer-songwriter and producer), Viktor Drobysh (composer and producer) and Larisa Dolina (singer).

On 7 March 2006, C1R announced that they had internally selected Dima Bilan to represent Russia in Athens. Bilan's selection as the Russian representative was decided upon by the jury panel from three shortlisted candidates: Ariana, Bilan and Varvara. Bilan previously attempted to represent Russia at the Eurovision Song Contest in 2004 and 2005. A new contest song was to be composed on the request of the jury, with "Never Let You Go" being kept as a backup, however "Never Let You Go" was ultimately selected as the Russian song due to a lack of time to create a new song within ten days for the official entry to be submitted to the European Broadcasting Union. "Never Let You Go" was composed by Alexander Lunyov, with lyrics by Irina Antonyan and Karen Kavaleryan; Antonyan and Kavaleryan previously co-wrote the lyrics for the 2002 Russian entry.

Known submitted entries
Artist(s)	Song
Alexandr Panayotov	Unknown
Ariana	"Don't Go"
Balagan Limited	"Welcome to Russia"
Bizyulka	"Rachok" (Рачок)
Dima Bilan	"Lady Flame"
Dima Bilan	"Never Let You Go"
Gerda	"Ninka" (Нинка)
Jam	"Children of the World"
Jasmin	"Desperate Foreigner"
Julietta M.	"Sex"
Namik Aliev	"Baqishla"
Nikolay Burlak	Unknown
Polina Griffith	"Don't Tell Me Goodbye"
Private Beat	"Goodbye"
Ranetki	"Ona odna" (Она одна)
Respublika	"Rus moya, grust" (Русь моя, грусть)
Sergey Abalymov	Unknown
Sergey Ermilov	"I Wanna"
Varvara	"We'll Be There"
Zhenya Rasskazova	"Na territorii serdtsa" (На территории сердца)
Zhenya Rasskazova	"Ya ne hochu odna na kray zemli" (Я не хочу одна на край земли)

First Round - 7 March 2006
Artist(s)	Song
Ariana	"Don't Go"
Dima Bilan	"Lady Flame"
Dima Bilan	"Never Let You Go"
Jasmin	"Desperate Foreigner"
Polina Griffith	"Don't Tell Me Goodbye"
Varvara	"We'll Be There"

Second Round – 7 March 2006
Artist	Song	Songwriter(s)	Votes	Place
Ariana	"Don't Go"	Matvey Anichkin, Ariana Grinblat	0	3
Dima Bilan	"Lady Flame"	Alexander Lunyov, Irina Antonyan, Karen Kavaleryan	6	1
Dima Bilan	"Never Let You Go"	Alexander Lunyov, Irina Antonyan, Karen Kavaleryan	6	1
Varvara	"We'll Be There"	Artyom Orlov, Marc Paelinck	1	2

== At Eurovision ==
Since Russia did not place in the top 10 countries (excluding the Big Four) in the 2005 Contest, Russia was required to compete in the semi-final of the Eurovision Song Contest 2006 on 18 May 2006. On 21 March 2006, Russia was drawn to perform 13th in the semi-final, following Poland and preceding Turkey.

For the Russian performance, Bilan was joined on stage by two ballerinas and two backing vocalists as well as a hollow white piano where a third ballerina emerged from a rose covered opening later in the performance. Russia qualified from the semi-final, placing 3rd and scoring 217 points. Since Russia was the first national announced as a qualifying country during the semi-final broadcast, Russia took the first available qualifier spot in the final running order. In the final, Russia performed 10th, following Denmark and preceding Macedonia. After the voting concluded, Russia scored 248 points and placed 2nd. Since Russia was among the top 10 countries, excluding the nations that constitute the Big Four, Russia pre-qualified to compete directly in the final of the 2007 Contest.

The semi-final and final were broadcast on Channel One, with commentary by Yuriy Aksyuta and Tatyana Godunova. The voting spokesperson for Russia was Yana Churikova.

=== Voting ===
==== Points awarded to Russia ====
Points awarded to Russia (Semi-final)
Score	Country
12 points	Armenia; Belarus; Bulgaria; Israel; Latvia; Lithuania; Moldova; Ukraine
10 points	Cyprus; Estonia
8 points	Malta; Poland
7 points	Portugal; Romania; Sweden
6 points	Finland; Iceland; Serbia and Montenegro
5 points	Germany; Greece; Macedonia
4 points	Andorra; Bosnia and Herzegovina; Ireland; Norway; Slovenia; Turkey
3 points	Croatia
2 points	Belgium
1 point	Denmark; Netherlands

Points awarded to Russia (Final)
Score	Country
12 points	Armenia; Belarus; Finland; Israel; Latvia; Lithuania; Ukraine
10 points	Bulgaria; Estonia; Moldova; Poland
8 points	Cyprus; Greece; Macedonia; Romania
7 points	Croatia; Portugal; Spain; Sweden
6 points	Andorra; Bosnia and Herzegovina; Germany
5 points	Iceland; Ireland; Malta; Serbia and Montenegro; Turkey
4 points	Albania; Slovenia
3 points	Belgium; Norway
2 points	Denmark; France; Netherlands
1 point	United Kingdom

==== Points awarded by Russia ====
Points awarded by Russia (Semi-final)
Score	Country
12 points	Armenia
10 points	Ukraine
8 points	Finland
7 points	Bosnia and Herzegovina
6 points	Belarus
5 points	Poland
4 points	Lithuania
3 points	Sweden
2 points	Albania
1 point	Ireland

Points awarded by Russia (Final)
Score	Country
12 points	Armenia
10 points	Ukraine
8 points	Finland
7 points	Norway
6 points	Bosnia and Herzegovina
5 points	Lithuania
4 points	Romania
3 points	Moldova
2 points	Sweden
1 point	Latvia
