= Malta in the Eurovision Song Contest 2006 =

- Eurovision Song Contest 2006
- Participating broadcaster: Public Broadcasting Services (PBS)
- Country: Malta
- Selection process: Malta Song for Europe 2006
- Selection date: 4 February 2006

Competing entry
- Song: "I Do"
- Artist: Fabrizio Faniello
- Songwriters: Aldo Spiteri; Fabrizio Faniello

Placement
- Final result: 24th, 1 point

Participation chronology

Malta was represented at the Eurovision Song Contest 2006 with the song "I Do", written by Aldo Spiteri and Fabrizio Faniello, and performed by Faniello himself. The Maltese participating broadcaster, Public Broadcasting Services (PBS), selected its entry for the contest through a national competition consisting of two phases: Opportunity 2 and Malta Song for Europe 2006. In the final, held on 4 February 2006, "I Do" performed by Fabrizio Faniello emerged as the winning entry after gaining the most votes from a public televote with 7,729 votes. Faniello had already represented Malta in 2001.

As one of the ten highest placed finishers in 2005, Malta automatically qualified to compete in the final of the Eurovision Song Contest. Performing during the show in position 7, Malta placed twenty-fourth (last) out of the 24 participating countries with 1 point.

== Background ==
Prior to the 2006 contest, the Maltese Broadcasting Authority (MBA) until 1975, and the Public Broadcasting Services (PBS) since 1991, had participated in the Eurovision Song Contest representing Malta eighteen times since MBA's first entry in 1971. After competing in 1975, Malta was absent from the contest beginning in 1976. They had, to this point, competed in every contest since returning in 1991. Their best placing in the contest thus far was second, which it achieved on two occasions: in 2002 with the song "7th Wonder" performed by Ira Losco and in 2005 with the song "Angel" performed by Chiara.

As part of its duties as participating broadcaster, PBS organises the selection of its entry in the Eurovision Song Contest and broadcasts the event in the country. The broadcaster confirmed its intentions to participate in the 2006 contest on 18 August 2005. The Maltese broadcaster had selected its entry consistently through a national final procedure, a method that was continued for its 2006 participation.

== Before Eurovision ==
=== Opportunity 2 ===
Opportunity 2 was the first phase of the national final format developed by PBS to select its entry for the Eurovision Song Contest 2006. Artists that have never competed in Malta Song for Europe were able to submit their entries for the competition between 18 August 2005 and 14 September 2005. Thirty-six songs were chosen to compete in the semi-final which consisted of nine shows between 8 October 2005 and 17 December 2005 with four songs being presented in each show. Ten entries qualified to compete in the final on 7 January 2006 where two songs, as decided by a public televote, qualified for Malta Song for Europe 2006. All shows were broadcast during the programme Showtime ma' Aceline on Television Malta (TVM), hosted by Moira Delia and Manuel Xuereb.

Semi-final – 8 October–17 December 2005
Broadcast	R/O	Artist	Song	Result
8 October 2005	1	Lino Busuttil	"Together"	—N/a
8 October 2005	2	Leanne Ellul	"In My Life"	—N/a
8 October 2005	3	Ina Robinich and Dominic Cini	"Name of the Game"	—N/a
8 October 2005	4	Corazon Mizzi	"17"	—N/a
15 October 2005	1	Maria Mallia	"For Your Smile"	—N/a
15 October 2005	2	Vittorio Gauci	"Is It Destiny"	Qualified
15 October 2005	3	Jeannette Scicluna	"Peaceful Dreams"	—N/a
15 October 2005	4	Alexia Schembri	"Another Day of Hope"	Qualified
29 October 2005	1	Jessica Muscat	"Let Me Dream"	Qualified
29 October 2005	2	Joanna Attard	"Is It Too Late"	Qualified
29 October 2005	3	Natalie Vella	"Beautiful Lies"	—N/a
29 October 2005	4	Lino Busuttil	"We'll Find Love"	—N/a
5 November 2005	1	Pauline Briffa	"Is It Love"	Qualified
5 November 2005	2	Ivan Gaffiero	"No One"	—N/a
5 November 2005	3	Lara Azzopardi	"To the Limit"	—N/a
5 November 2005	4	Decoda Buttigieg	"Each Day I Live"	—N/a
12 November 2005	1	Isabelle Zammit	"I Miss You"	—N/a
12 November 2005	2	Diane and Odette Spiteri	"To Stay Alive"	—N/a
12 November 2005	3	Vittorio Gauci	"It's a Dream"	—N/a
12 November 2005	4	Dario Bezzina	"I Walk the Streets Alone"	Qualified
19 November 2005	1	Angela Spiteri	"Treasure in My Heart"	—N/a
19 November 2005	2	Isabelle Zammit	"Memories"	—N/a
19 November 2005	3	Alexia Schembri	"I'm in Love With You"	—N/a
19 November 2005	4	Ann Marie Ellul	"A Bit of Magic"	Qualified
3 December 2005	1	Josef Tabone and Amanda Farrugia	"It Just Comes Natural"	Qualified
3 December 2005	2	Charlene Vella	"Simple"	—N/a
3 December 2005	3	Decoda Buttigieg	"Sixteen"	—N/a
3 December 2005	4	Jessica Muscat	"My Dream Is You"	—N/a
10 December 2005	1	Leanne Ellul	"Never Let Go"	—N/a
10 December 2005	2	Anabel Spiteri	"I Sing for You"	—N/a
10 December 2005	3	Daniela Vella	"The Night We Say Goodbye"	—N/a
10 December 2005	4	Lara Azzopardi	"Stay With Me"	Qualified
17 December 2005	1	Malcolm Pisani	"I Wanna See You"	—N/a
17 December 2005	2	Stephanie Zammit	"Little Miss Fun"	—N/a
17 December 2005	3	Jan Pace	"Forever Young"	Qualified
17 December 2005	4	Corinne Caruana and Christine Buttigieg	"Gateway to Your Heart"	—N/a

Final – 7 January 2006
R/O	Artist	Song	Result
1	Vittorio Gauci	"Is It Destiny"	—N/a
2	Alexia Schembri	"Another Day of Hope"	—N/a
3	Jessica Muscat	"Let Me Dream"	—N/a
4	Joanna Attard	"Is It Too Late"	—N/a
5	Pauline Briffa	"Is It Love"	—N/a
6	Dario Bezzina	"I Walk the Streets Alone"	—N/a
7	Ann Marie Ellul	"A Bit of Magic"	—N/a
8	Josef Tabone and Amanda Farrugia	"It Just Comes Natural"	Qualified
9	Lara Azzopardi	"Stay With Me"	Qualified
10	Jan Pace	"Forever Young"	—N/a

=== Malta Song for Europe 2006 ===
Malta Song for Europe 2006 was the second phase of the national final format developed by PBS to select its entry for the Eurovision Song Contest 2006. The competition was held on 4 February 2006 at the Mediterranean Conference Centre in the nation's capital city of Valletta. The show was hosted by Eileen Montesin, Josef Bonello and Lou Bondi and broadcast on Television Malta (TVM) as well as on the website di-ve.com.

==== Competing entries ====
Artists and composers were able to submit their entries between 30 October 2005 and 5 December 2005. Songwriters from any nationality were able to submit songs as long as entry applications from foreign songwriters were eligible in their country. Artists were required to be Maltese or possess Maltese citizenship and could submit as many songs as they wished, however, they could only compete with a maximum of one in the competition. 213 entries were received by the broadcaster. On 9 December 2005, PBS announced a shortlist of 35 entries that had progressed through the selection process. The sixteen songs selected to compete in the final were announced on 17 December 2005. Among the selected competing artists were former Maltese Eurovision entrants Paul Giordimaina (who represented Malta in 1991), and Fabrizio Faniello (who represented Malta in 2001).

On 22 December 2005, "Turn Another Page", written by Paul Giordimaina and Fleur Balzan and to have been performed by Pamela, was withdrawn from the competition and replaced with the song "Stronger" performed by Christian Arding. Anabelle Debono and Claudia Faniello replaced Nadine Axisa and Olivia Lewis, both of them which had been selected with two songs each, as the performers of the songs "Amazing" and "High Alert", respectively.

==== Final ====
The final took place on 4 February 2006. Eighteen entries competed and the winner was determined solely by a public televote. The interval act of the show featured performances by former Maltese Eurovision entrants Georgina Abela (1991), William Mangion (1993), Mike Spiteri (1995), Claudette Pace (2000), and Chiara (1998 and 2005), Lou Bondi and the local acts Alex Manché and Ray Calleja. After the results of the public televote were announced, "I Do" performed by Fabrizio Faniello was the winner.

Final – 4 February 2006
R/O	Artist	Song	Songwriter(s)	Televote	Place
1	J. Anvil	"You Too"	Augusto Cardinali, Giovanni Attard	4,933	4
2	Anabelle Debono	"Amazing"	Philip Vella, Gerard James Borg	2,107	14
3 (Note: Due to technical difficulties in the performance, Ali and Lis were allowed to perform again following Olivia Lewis performing "Spare a Moment".)	Ali and Lis	"Only Till the Morning"	John David Zammit, Paul Callus	3,907	6
4	Lara Azzopardi	"Stay With Me"	Chan Vella, Paul Callus	1,637	17
5	Charlene and Natasha	"Echoes of Gaia"	Charlene Grima, Natasha Grima, Deo Grech	2,836	10
6	Manuel Xuereb	"I Promise You"	Miriam Christine Warner	3,782	7
7 (Note: Due to technical difficulties in the performance, Fabrizio Faniello was allowed to perform again following the second performance of "Only Till the Morning" by Ali and Lis.)	Fabrizio Faniello	"I Do"	Aldo Spiteri, Fabrizio Faniello	7,729	1
8	Eleanor Cassar	"Tell Me"	Paul Giordimaina, Fleur Balzan	2,646	11
9	Trilogy	"This Heart of Mine"	Paul Abela, Joe Julian Farrugia	4,954	3
10	Andreana	"So Good"	Alfred Zammit	635	18
11	Paul Giordimaina and Morena	"Time"	Paul Giordimaina, Fleur Balzan	3,046	9
12	Pamela	"Reachin' Out"	Paul Giordimaina, Fleur Balzan	2,371	13
13	Christian Arding	"Stronger"	Charlene Grima, Deo Grech	4,075	5
14	Nadine Axisa	"Waves"	Vinny Vella, Ray Tabone	1,680	16
15	Josef Tabone and Amanda Farrugia	"It Just Comes Natural"	Clinton Paul	1,980	15
16	Kevin Borg	"You're My Dream"	Jason Cassar, Sunny Aquilina	3,590	8
17	Claudia Faniello	"High Alert"	Ray Agius, Godwin Sant	2,416	12
18	Olivia Lewis	"Spare a Moment"	Ray Agius, Godwin Sant	7,623	2

== At Eurovision ==
The Eurovision Song Contest 2006 took place at the Nikos Galis Olympic Indoor Hall in Athens, Greece and consisted of a semi-final on 18 May and the final of 20 May 2006. According to Eurovision rules, all nations with the exceptions of the host country, the "Big Four" (France, Germany, Spain and the United Kingdom) and the ten highest placed finishers in the 2005 contest are required to qualify from the semi-final in order to compete for the final; the top ten countries from the semi-final progress to the final. As one of the ten highest placed finishers in the 2006 contest, Malta automatically qualified to compete in the final. In addition to their participation in the final, Malta is also required to broadcast and vote in the semi-final. On 21 March 2006, an allocation draw was held which determined the running order and Malta was set to perform in position 7 during the final, following the entry from Spain and before the entry from Germany. Malta placed twenty-fourth (last) in the final, scoring 1 point.

The semi-final and the final were broadcast in Malta on TVM with commentary by Eileen Montesin. PBS appointed Moira Delia as its spokesperson to announce the Maltese votes during the final.

=== Voting ===
Below is a breakdown of points awarded to Malta and awarded by Malta in the semi-final and grand final of the contest. The nation awarded its 12 points to Sweden in the semi-final and to Switzerland in the final of the contest.

==== Points awarded to Malta ====
Points awarded to Malta (Final)
Score	Country
12 points	
10 points	
8 points	
7 points	
6 points	
5 points	
4 points	
3 points	
2 points	
1 point	Albania

==== Points awarded by Malta ====
Points awarded by Malta (Semi-final)
Score	Country
12 points	Sweden
10 points	Finland
8 points	Russia
7 points	Belgium
6 points	Ireland
5 points	Slovenia
4 points	Cyprus
3 points	Ukraine
2 points	Bosnia and Herzegovina
1 point	Poland

Points awarded by Malta (Final)
Score	Country
12 points	Switzerland
10 points	Romania
8 points	Greece
7 points	Finland
6 points	Sweden
5 points	Russia
4 points	Ireland
3 points	United Kingdom
2 points	Ukraine
1 point	Lithuania
