= Albania in the Eurovision Song Contest 2006 =

- Eurovision Song Contest 2006
- Participating broadcaster: Radio Televizioni Shqiptar (RTSH)
- Country: Albania
- Selection process: Festivali i Këngës 44
- Selection date: 18 December 2005

Competing entry
- Song: "Zjarr e ftohtë"
- Artist: Luiz Ejlli
- Songwriters: Klodian Qafoku; Florian Kondi

Placement
- Final result: Failed to qualify (14th)

Participation chronology

Albania was represented at the Eurovision Song Contest 2006 with the song "Zjarr e ftohtë", composed by Klodian Qafoku, with lyrics by Florian Kondi, and performed by Luiz Ejlli. The Albanian participating broadcaster, Radio Televizioni Shqiptar (RTSH), selected its entry through the national selection competition Festivali i Këngës in December 2005.

Due to the non-top 11 result in the previous contest, Albania was drawn to compete in the semi-final of the contest, which took place on 18 May 2006. Performing as number six, the nation was not announced among the top 10 entries of the semi-final and therefore failed to qualify for the grand final, marking Albania's first non-qualification in the contest.

== Background ==
Prior to the 2006 contest, Radio Televizioni Shqiptar (RTSH) had participated in the Eurovision Song Contest representing Albania two times since its first entry in 2004. Its highest placing in the contest, to this point, had been the seventh place, achieved in 2004 with the song "The Image of You" performed by Anjeza Shahini.

As part of its duties as participating broadcaster, RTSH organises the selection of its entry in the Eurovision Song Contest and broadcasts the event in the country. RTSH has organised Festivali i Këngës since its inauguration in 1962. Since 2003, the winner of the competition has simultaneously won the right to represent Albania in the Eurovision Song Contest.

== Before Eurovision ==
=== Festivali i Këngës ===
RTSH organised the 44th edition of Festivali i Këngës to determine its entry for the Eurovision Song Contest 2006. The competition consisted of two semi-finals on 16 and 17 December, respectively, and the grand final on 18 December 2005. The three live shows were hosted by Albanian singer Soni Malaj and presenter Drini Zeqo.

==== Competing entries ====
Competing entries
Artist	Song
Agim Poshka	"Nostalgji"
Albërie Hadergjonaj	"Ah, sikur kjo jetë"
Anjeza Shahini	"Pse ndal"
Armando Bimi	"Mall"
Aurel Thëllimi	"Dhe kur kujtesa"
Besart Halimi	"Loja dashuri"
Denisa Macaj and Entela Zhula	"Kur zemra prek një dashuri"
Edona Llalloshi	"Vetëm një puthje"
Era Rusi	"Nuk je ëndërr"
Eri	"Dumbade"
Erinda Dhima	"Për ju"
Ermiona Lekbello	"Gjysëm ëndërr je o grua"
Erti Hizmo and Flaka Krelani	"Për ty"
Edmond Mancaku	"Ish dashuri dhe jo mëkat"
Evis Mula	"E dua këngën"
Guximtar Rushani	"Lotë dashurie"
Ingrid Jushi	"Po dhe jo"
Joe Artid Fejzo	"Zhurma e heshtjes"
Julian Lekoçaj	"Niki"
Kozma Dushi	"Se nuk plaken ëndrrat"
Kujtim Prodani	"Theva kokën si pa dashur"
Luiz Ejlli	"Zjarr e ftohtë"
Manjola Nallbani	"S'mjafton një jetë"
Mariza Ikonomi and Erion Korini	"Edhe fati qan"
Marsida Saraçi	"Do të doja"
Mateus Froku	"Tu ëngjëll unë promethe"
Miriam Cani	"Shko"
Pandora	"Pritja"
Rudi	"Qyteti im"
Saimir Çili	"Hipokrizi"
Sfinks	"Heshtje"
Sonila Mara	"Vjeshtë me ty"
Tonin Marku	"Syte e dashurisë"
Yllka Kuqi	"Të gjeta"

==== Shows ====
===== Semi-finals =====
The semi-finals of Festivali i Këngës took place on 16 December and 17 December 2005, respectively. 17 contestants participated in each semi-final, with the highlighted ones progressing to the grand final.

Semi-final 1 – 16 December 2005
R/O	Artist	Song	Result
1	Besart Halimi	"Loja dashuri"	—N/a
2	Sfinks	"Heshtje"	—N/a
3	Rudi	"Qyteti im"	—N/a
4	Edmond Mancaku	"Ish dashuri dhe jo mëkat"	—N/a
5	Aurel Thëllimi	"Dhe kur kujtesa"	—N/a
6	Julian Lekoçaj	"Niki"	—N/a
7	Erinda Dhima	"Për ju"	Qualified
8	Edona Llalloshi	"Vetëm një puthje"	Qualified
9	Tonin Marku	"Sytë e dashurisë"	—N/a
10	Agim Poshka	"Nostalgji"	Qualified
11	Evis Mula	"Ku t'a gjej unë këngën"	Qualified
12	Mateus Frroku	"Ti ëngjëll, unë prometë"	Qualified
13	Era Rusi	"Nuk je ëndërr"	Qualified
14	Ermiona Lekbello	"Gjysëm ëndërr je o grua"	—N/a
15	Erti Hizmo and Flaka Krelani	"Për ty'	Qualified
16	Joe Artid Fejzo	"Zhurma e heshtjës"	—N/a
17	Kozma Dushi	"Nuk plaken ëndrrat"	Qualified

Semi-final 2 – 17 December 2005
R/O	Artist	Song	Result
1	Eri and Perfect Bliss	"Dumbade"	Qualified
2	Sonida Mara	"Vjeshtë me ty"	Qualified
3	Armando Dimi	"Mall"	—N/a
4	Guximtar Rushani	"Lotë Dashurie"	—N/a
5	Yllka Kuqi	"Të gjeta"	—N/a
6	Pandora	"Pritja"	—N/a
7	Denisa Macaj and Entela Zhula	"Kur zemra prek një dashuri"	Qualified
8	Sajmir Çili	"Hipokrizi"	Qualified
9	Luiz Ejlli	"Zjarr e ftohtë"	Qualified
10	Ingrid Jushi	"Po dhe jo"	—N/a
11	Kujtim Prodani	"Theva kokën si pa dashur"	Qualified
12	Albërie Hadërgjonaj	"Ah sikur kjo jetë"	Qualified
13	Manjola Nallbani	"S'mjafton një jetë"	Qualified
14	Marsida Saraçi	"Do të doja"	Qualified
15	Anjeza Shahini	"Pse ndal'	Qualified
16	Miriam Cani	"Shko"	Qualified
17	Mariza Ikonomi and Erion Korini	"Edhe fati qan"	Qualified

===== Final =====
The grand final of Festivali i Këngës took place on 18 December 2005. "Zjarr e ftohtë" performed by Luiz Ejlli emerged as the winner and was simultaneously announced as the Albanian entry for the Eurovision Song Contest 2006.

Key: Winner Second place Third place

Final – 18 December 2005
R/O	Artist	Song	Place
1	Kujtim Prodani	"Theva kokën si pa dashur"	—N/a
2	Manjola Nallbani	"S'mjafton një jetë"	—N/a
3	Edona Llalloshi	"Vetëm një puthje"	—N/a
4	Eri and Perfect Bliss	"Dumbade"	—N/a
5	Marsida Saraçi	"Do të doja"	—N/a
6	Mateus Frroku	"Ti ëngjëll, unë promete"	—N/a
7	Mariza Ikonomi and Erion Korini	"Edhe fati qan"	—N/a
8	Kozma Dushi	"Se nuk plaken ëndrrat"	—N/a
9	Denisa Macaj and Entela Zhula	"Kur zemra prek një dashuri"	—N/a
10	Sonida Mara	"Vjeshtë me ty"	—N/a
11	Anjeza Shahini	"Pse ndal"	—N/a
12	Albërie Hadërgjonaj	"Ah sikur kjo jetë"	—N/a
13	Sajmir Çili	"Hipokrizi"	—N/a
14	Evis Mula	"Ku t'a gjej unë këngën"	3
15	Luiz Ejlli	"Zjarr e ftohtë"	1
16	Erti Hizmo and Flaka Krelani	"Për ty"	—N/a
17	Miriam Cani	"Shko"	—N/a
18	Era Rusi	"Nuk je ëndërr"	2
19	Agim Poshka	"Nostalgji"	—N/a
20	Erinda Dhima	"Për ju"	—N/a

== At Eurovision ==
The Eurovision Song Contest 2006 took place at the O.A.C.A. Olympic Indoor Hall in Athens, Greece, and consisted of a semi-final on 18 May and the grand final on 20 May 2006. According to the Eurovision rules at the time, all participating countries, except the host nation and the "Big Four", consisting of France, Germany, Spain and the United Kingdom, were required to qualify from the semi-final to compete for the final, although the top 10 countries from the semi-final progress to the final. Due to its non-top 11 result in the 2005 contest, Albania was required to compete in the semi-final. It was set to perform in position six, following Belarus and preceding Belgium. At the end of the semi-final, the country was not announced among the top 10 entries and therefore failed to qualify for the final, marking Albania's first non-qualification in the Eurovision Song Contest.

=== Voting ===
Between 1998 and 2008, the voting was calculated by 100% televoting from viewers across Europe. However, in 2005 the EBU introduced an undisclosed threshold number of televotes that would have to be registered in each voting country in order to make that country's votes valid. If that number was not reached, the country's backup jury would vote instead. In both the semi-final and final of the contest, this affected two countries: one of them being Albania, who therefore had to use a backup jury panel to calculate its results. This jury judged each entry based on: vocal capacity; the stage performance; the song's composition and originality; and the overall impression of the act. In addition, no member of a national jury was permitted to be related in any way to any of the competing acts in such a way that they cannot vote impartially and independently.

The tables below visualise a breakdown of points awarded to Albania in the semi-final of the Eurovision Song Contest 2006, as well as by the country for both the semi-final and grand final. In the semi-final, Albania finished in 14th place with a total of 58 points, including 12 from Macedonia and 10 from Switzerland. Albania awarded its 12 points to Macedonia in the semi-final and to Bosnia and Herzegovina in the grand final of the contest.

==== Points awarded to Albania ====
Points awarded to Albania (Semi-final)
Score	Country
12 points	Macedonia
10 points	Switzerland
8 points	
7 points	Croatia; Greece
6 points	
5 points	Bosnia and Herzegovina
4 points	
3 points	Germany; Norway; Turkey
2 points	Russia; Sweden; United Kingdom
1 point	Armenia; Slovenia

==== Points awarded by Albania ====
Points awarded by Albania (Semi-final)
Score	Country
12 points	Macedonia
10 points	Bosnia and Herzegovina
8 points	Bulgaria
7 points	Slovenia
6 points	Turkey
5 points	Sweden
4 points	Cyprus
3 points	Armenia
2 points	Netherlands
1 point	Ireland

Points awarded by Albania (Final)
Score	Country
12 points	Bosnia and Herzegovina
10 points	Sweden
8 points	Greece
7 points	Turkey
6 points	Spain
5 points	Germany
4 points	Russia
3 points	Macedonia
2 points	Romania
1 point	Malta
