= Armenia in the Eurovision Song Contest 2006 =

- Eurovision Song Contest 2006
- Participating broadcaster: Public Television of Armenia (AMPTV)
- Country: Armenia
- Selection process: Internal selection
- Announcement date: Artist: 20 January 2006; Song: 17 March 2006

Competing entry
- Song: "Without Your Love"
- Artist: André
- Songwriters: Armen Matirosyan; Catherine Bekian

Placement
- Semi-final result: Qualified (6th, 150 points)
- Final result: 8th, 129 points

Participation chronology

Armenia was represented at the Eurovision Song Contest 2006 with the song "Without Your Love", composed by Armen Matirosyan, with lyrics by Catherine Bekian, and performed by André. The Armenian participating broadcaster, the Public Television Company of Armenia (AMPTV), internally selected its entry for the contest. André's selection as the Armenian artist was announced on 20 January 2006, while the song was later presented to the public on 17 March 2006. This was the first-ever entry from Armenia in the Eurovision Song Contest.

Armenia competed in the semi-final of the Eurovision Song Contest which took place on 18 May 2006. Performing as the opening entry for the show in position 1, "Without Your Love" was announced among the top 10 entries of the semi-final and therefore qualified to compete in the final on 20 May. It was later revealed that Armenia placed sixth out of the 23 participating countries in the semi-final with 150 points. In the final, Armenia was the closing performance of the show in position 24, placing eighth out of the 24 participating countries with 129 points.

== Background ==
The Armenian national broadcaster, the Public Television Company of Armenia (AMPTV), confirmed its intentions to debut at the Eurovision Song Contest in its 2006 edition. Despite initially announcing that a national final would be organized to select its debut entry, AMPTV later opted to internally select both the artist and the song instead.

== Before Eurovision ==
=== Internal selection ===
The Armenian entry for the Eurovision Song Contest 2006 was internally selected by the AMPTV. On 20 January 2006, André was announced as the Armenian representative. In regards to his selection, André stated: "I was so excited at first when I learned the news of my participation. Then I realized what a tremendous responsibility it is, after all I am going to represent not my personality but the country, and that is very serious." AMPTV later announced in February 2006 that its entry had been selected from 20 songs submitted by songwriters worldwide following a public call for song submissions.

On 8 February 2006, AMPTV announced the song "Without Your Love", composed by Armen Matirosyan with lyrics by Catherine Bekian, as its entry for the contest. André filmed the official video for the song prior to the presentation, which was directed by Hrach Keshishyan. The song and video were presented to the public on 17 March 2006.

== At Eurovision ==
All countries except the "Big 4" (France, Germany, Spain and the United Kingdom), the host country, and the ten highest placed finishers in the 2005 contest, are required to qualify from the semi-final in order to compete for the final; the top ten countries from the semi-final progress to the final. On 21 March 2006, an allocation draw was held which determined the running order for the semi-final and Armenia was set to open the show and perform in position 1, before the entry from Bulgaria. At the end of the show, Armenia was announced as having finished in the top 10 and subsequently qualifying for the grand final. It was later revealed that Armenia placed sixth in the semi-final, receiving a total of 150 points. During the winners' press conference for the ten qualifying countries after the semi-final, Armenia was drawn to perform last in position 24, following the entry from Turkey. Armenia placed eighth in the final, scoring 129 points.

In Armenia, both the semi-final and the final were broadcast on Channel 1 with commentary by Gohar Gasparyan and Felix Khachatryan. AMPTV appointed Gohar Gasparyan as its spokesperson to announce the Armenian votes during the final.

=== Voting ===
Below is a breakdown of points awarded to Armenia and awarded by Armenia in the semi-final and grand final of the contest. The nation awarded its 12 points to Russia in the semi-final and the final of the contest.

==== Points awarded to Armenia ====
Points awarded to Armenia (Semi-final)
Score	Country
12 points	Belgium; Cyprus; France; Netherlands; Russia; Spain
10 points	Greece; Israel; Turkey
8 points	Bulgaria
7 points	Belarus; Germany; Ukraine
6 points	
5 points	
4 points	
3 points	Albania; Poland; Sweden; Switzerland; United Kingdom
2 points	Moldova; Romania
1 point	

Points awarded to Armenia (Final)
Score	Country
12 points	Belgium; Russia
10 points	France; Greece; Netherlands; Turkey
8 points	Belarus; Bulgaria; Israel; Spain; Ukraine
7 points	Cyprus; Moldova
6 points	
5 points	Poland
4 points	
3 points	Germany
2 points	Lithuania
1 point	Romania

==== Points awarded by Armenia ====
Points awarded by Armenia (Semi-final)
Score	Country
12 points	Russia
10 points	Ukraine
8 points	Macedonia
7 points	Cyprus
6 points	Sweden
5 points	Bosnia and Herzegovina
4 points	Netherlands
3 points	Poland
2 points	Slovenia
1 point	Albania

Points awarded by Armenia (Final)
Score	Country
12 points	Russia
10 points	Ukraine
8 points	Greece
7 points	Macedonia
6 points	Sweden
5 points	Bosnia and Herzegovina
4 points	Romania
3 points	Ireland
2 points	France
1 point	Norway
