= Slovenia in the Eurovision Song Contest 2006 =

- Eurovision Song Contest 2006
- Participating broadcaster: Radiotelevizija Slovenija (RTVSLO)
- Country: Slovenia
- Selection process: Evrovizijska Melodija 2006
- Selection date: 29 January 2006

Competing entry
- Song: "Mr Nobody"
- Artist: Anžej Dežan
- Songwriters: Matjaž Vlašič; Urša Vlašič

Placement
- Semi-final result: Failed to qualify (16th)

Participation chronology

Slovenia was represented at the Eurovision Song Contest 2006 with the song "Mr Nobody", composed by Matjaž Vlašić, with lyrics by Urša Vlašić, and performed by Anžej Dežan. The Slovene participating broadcaster, Radiotelevizija Slovenija (RTVSLO), organised the national final Evrovizijska Melodija 2006 in order to select its entry for the contest. Fourteen entries competed in the national final where "Plan B" performed by Anžej Dežan was selected following the combination of votes from a five-member jury panel and a public televote. The song was later translated from Slovene to English for Eurovision and was titled "Mr Nobody".

Slovenia competed in the semi-final of the Eurovision Song Contest which took place on 18 May 2006. Performing during the show in position 3, "Mr Nobody" was not announced among the top 10 entries of the semi-final and therefore did not qualify to compete in the final. It was later revealed that Slovenia placed sixteenth out of the 23 participating countries in the semi-final with 49 points.

== Background ==
Prior to the 2006 contest, Radiotelevizija Slovenija (RTVSLO) had participated in the Eurovision Song Contest representing Slovenia eleven times since its first entry in 1993. Its highest placing in the contest, to this point, has been seventh place, achieved on two occasions: in 1995 with the song "Prisluhni mi" performed by Darja Švajger, and in 2001 with the song "Energy" performed by Nuša Derenda. Its only other top ten result was achieved in 1997 when "Zbudi se" performed by Tanja Ribič placed tenth. In 2005, "Stop" performed by Omar Naber failed to qualify to the final.

As part of its duties as participating broadcaster, RTVSLO organises the selection of its entry in the Eurovision Song Contest and broadcasts the event in the country. The broadcaster confirmed its participation in the 2006 contest on 18 September 2005. The broadcaster has traditionally selected its entry through a national final entitled Evrovizijska Melodija (EMA), which has been produced with variable formats. For 2006, RTVSLO opted to organise Evrovizijska Melodija 2006 (EMA 2006) to select its entry.

== Before Eurovision ==
=== Evrovizijska Melodija 2006 ===
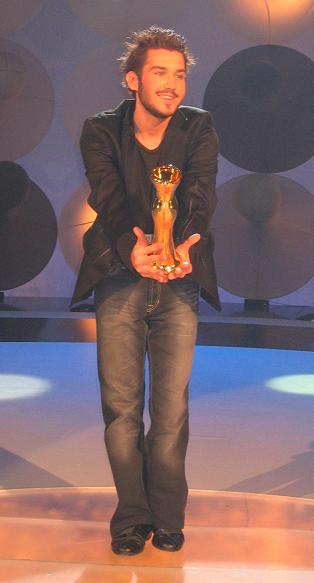
Anžej Dežan at EMA 2006

Evrovizijska Melodija 2006 (EMA 2006) was the 11th edition of the national final format Evrovizijska Melodija, organised by RTVSLO to select its entry for the Eurovision Song Contest 2006. The competition took place at the RTVSLO Studio 1 in Ljubljana, hosted by Janez Škof, Aljoša Ternovšek and Boris Koba and was broadcast on TV SLO1, Radio Val 202 and online via the broadcaster's website rtvslo.si.

==== Format ====
Fourteen songs competed in a televised show where the combination of points from a five-member expert jury and a public televote determined the winner. The televote was divided into two groups: votes cast via landline phones and mobile phones, and each group assigned points as follows: 1–8, 10 and 12. The expert jury also assigned points from 1-8, 10 and 12, and the song that received the highest overall score when the votes were combined was the winner.

The jury that voted during the final consisted of:

- Martin Žvelc – music producer
- Nataša Assejev – editor for RTVSLO
- Cole Moretti – represented Slovenia in 1993 as member of 1X Band
- Dragan Trivič – musician, Head of the RTVSLO legal department
- Črt Sojar Voglar – composer

==== Competing entries ====
Artists and composers were able to submit their entries to the broadcaster between 29 September 2005 and 20 November 2005. 107 entries were received by the broadcaster during the submission period. An expert committee consisting of Jaka Pucihar (composer), Rok Lopatič (music producer), Jernej Vene (music editor for Radio Val 202), Mitja Ciuha (Eurovision expert) and Mario Galunič (television presenter) selected fourteen artists and songs for the competition from the received submissions. The competing artists were announced on 28 November 2005.

Artist	Song	Songwriter(s)
Alenka Godec	"Hočem stran"	Anja Rupel, Alenka Godec, Aleš Klinar
Andraž Hribar	"Rapad tepe ipi mapam"	Milan Hribar, Andraž Hriba
Anžej Dežan	"Plan B"	Urša Vlašić, Matjaž Vlašić
Atomik Harmonik	"Polkaholik"	Dare Kaurič
Katrinas	"Najdi me"	Katarina Habe
Maja Slatinšek	"Vihar"	Maja Slatinšek, Gregor Sulejmanovič
Marijan Novina	"V mojih dlaneh"	Marijan Novina, Bojan Vojnovič
Monika Pučelj	"Ostani z mano"	Anja Rupel, Aleš Klinar
Natalija Verboten	"SOS"	Urša Vlašič, Matjaž Vlašič
Nuška Drašček	"Nora sem, da te ljubim"	Rudolf Gas
Rebeka Dremelj and Domen Kumer	"Noro se ujameva"	Natka Geržina, Borut Lipavec
Saša Lendero	"Mandoline"	Andrej Babić, Saša Lendero
Sergeja	"Tu da du"	Franco Zabukovec
Ylenia	"Hokus pokus"	Damjana Kenda-Hussu, Marino Legovič

==== Final ====
EMA 2006 took place on 29 January 2006. In addition to the performances of the competing entries, Alya and Nuša Derenda (who represented Slovenia in 2001) performed as guests. The combination of points from a five-member jury panel (1/3) and a public televote split into votes cast via landline phones (1/3) and mobile phones (1/3) selected "Plan B" performed by Anžej Dežan as the winner.

Final – 29 January 2006
R/O	Artist	Song	Jury	Televote				Total	Place
R/O	Artist	Song	Jury	Landlines		Mobiles		Total	Place
1	Nuška Drašček	"Nora sem, da te ljubim"	8	1,326	0	1,725	3	11	9
2	Natalija Verboten	"SOS"	1	5,616	6	3,794	6	13	6
3	Rebeka Dremelj and Domen Kumer	"Noro se ujameva"	2	9,280	8	8,475	8	18	4
4	Sergeja	"Tu da du"	0	600	0	777	0	0	13
5	Saša Lendero	"Mandoline"	0	12,164	12	11,567	12	24	2
6	Andraž Hribar	"Rapad tepe ipi mapam"	7	702	0	610	0	7	11
7	Marijan Novina	"V mojih dlaneh"	0	720	0	547	0	0	13
8	Atomik Harmonik	"Polkaholik"	0	9,736	10	9,688	10	20	3
9	Maja Slatinšek	"Vihar"	5	1,473	1	1,551	2	8	10
10	Ylenia	"Hokus pokus"	10	1,526	2	1,084	0	12	7
11	Anžej Dežan	"Plan B"	12	6,377	7	4,474	7	26	1
12	Katrinas	"Najdi me"	4	2,509	4	1,947	4	12	7
13	Monika Pučelj	"Ostani z mano"	6	3,849	5	2,807	5	16	5
14	Alenka Godec	"Hočem stran"	3	2,004	3	1,525	1	7	11

=== Controversy ===
The results of EMA 2006 caused controversy as Saša Lendero who won both televoting groups ultimately placed second due to the jury awarding her zero points, marking the sixth time in last seven editions of EMA that the jury expelled the televoting winner from their votes. "Plan B" was also accused of plagiarising the song "Santa Maria" by Austrian singer Simone, however the European Broadcasting Union (EBU) allowed the song to compete in the Eurovision Song Contest as they did not see it as a plagiarism. A new version of "Plan B" was later created with the song being translated to English for the contest titled "Mr Nobody".

=== Promotion ===
Anžej Dežan made several appearances across Europe to specifically promote "Mr Nobody" as the Slovenian Eurovision entry. On 4 February, Dežan performed "Mr Nobody" during the Maltese Eurovision national final Malta Song for Europe 2006. Dežan also performed the song during the third elimination show of the Ukrainian Eurovision national final Ty – Zirka! on 25 February, and during the Serbian-Montenegrin Eurovision national final Evropesma-Europjesma 2006 on 11 March. On 8 April, Dežan appeared in Croatia during the HTV1 show Studio 10. Dežan also completed promotional activities in Macedonia in late April, including a performance during the Sitel TV programme Zvezdena Planeta.

== At Eurovision ==
According to Eurovision rules, all nations with the exceptions of the host country, the "Big Four" (France, Germany, Spain and the United Kingdom) and the ten highest placed finishers in the 2005 contest are required to qualify from the semi-final on 18 May 2006 in order to compete for the final on 20 May 2006; the top ten countries from the semi-final progress to the final. On 21 March 2006, an allocation draw was held which determined the running order for the semi-final and Slovenia was set to perform in position 3, following the entry from Bulgaria and before the entry from Andorra. At the end of the semi-final, Slovenia was not announced among the top 10 entries and therefore failed to qualify to compete in the final. It was later revealed that Slovenia placed sixteenth in the semi-final, receiving a total of 49 points.

In Slovenia, the semi-final was televised on TV SLO2 and the final was televised on TV SLO1. Both shows featured commentary by Mojca Mavec. RTVSLO appointed Peter Poles as its spokesperson to announce the Slovenian votes during the final.

=== Voting ===
Below is a breakdown of points awarded to Slovenia and awarded by Slovenia in the semi-final and grand final of the contest. The nation awarded its 12 points to Bosnia and Herzegovina in the semi-final and the final of the contest.

==== Points awarded to Slovenia ====
Points awarded to Slovenia (Semi-final)
Score	Country
12 points	
10 points	
8 points	
7 points	Albania; Bosnia and Herzegovina; Serbia and Montenegro
6 points	Croatia
5 points	Malta
4 points	Israel
3 points	Macedonia; Monaco
2 points	Armenia; Belarus; Ukraine
1 point	Finland

==== Points awarded by Slovenia ====
Points awarded by Slovenia (Semi-final)
Score	Country
12 points	Bosnia and Herzegovina
10 points	Finland
8 points	Macedonia
7 points	Sweden
6 points	Lithuania
5 points	Belgium
4 points	Russia
3 points	Ireland
2 points	Ukraine
1 point	Albania

Points awarded by Slovenia (Final)
Score	Country
12 points	Bosnia and Herzegovina
10 points	Croatia
8 points	Finland
7 points	Sweden
6 points	Macedonia
5 points	Romania
4 points	Russia
3 points	Lithuania
2 points	Ukraine
1 point	Ireland
