= Cyprus in the Eurovision Song Contest 2006 =

- Eurovision Song Contest 2006
- Participating broadcaster: Cyprus Broadcasting Corporation (CyBC)
- Country: Cyprus
- Selection process: A Song for Europe
- Selection date: 22 February 2006

Competing entry
- Song: "Why Angels Cry"
- Artist: Annet Artani
- Songwriters: Peter Yiannakis

Placement
- Semi-final result: Failed to qualify (15th)

Participation chronology

Cyprus was represented at the Eurovision Song Contest 2006 with the song "Why Angels Cry", written by Peter Yiannakis, and performed by Annet Artani. The Cypriot participating broadcaster, the Cyprus Broadcasting Corporation (CyBC), organised the national final A Song for Europe to select its entry for the contest. The selection event saw 20 candidate entries compete over two semi-finals, leading to a 10-participant final round on 22 February 2006. Despite the event experiencing controversy due to a perceived lack of transparency, the results were upheld.

Prior to the contest, Artani toured several European countries to promote the entry. The song competed in the semi-final of the Eurovision Song Contest on 18 May 2006 in position 9; however, "Why Angels Cry" was not announced among the top 10 entries and therefore did not qualify to compete in the final. It was later revealed that the entry placed 15th out of the 23 participating countries in the semi-final, with 57 points.

== Background ==
Prior to the 2006 contest, the Cyprus Broadcasting Corporation (CyBC) had participated in the Eurovision Song Contest representing Cyprus 23 times since its debut in the 1981 contest. Its best placing was fifth, which it achieved three times: in 1982 with the song "Mono i agapi" performed by Anna Vissi, in 1997 with "Mana mou" performed by Hara and Andreas Constantinou, and in 2004 with "Stronger Every Minute" performed by Lisa Andreas. Its least successful result was in 1986 when it placed last with the song "Tora zo" by Elpida, receiving only four points in total. Its worst finish in terms of points received, however, was in 1999 when it placed second to last with "Tha'nai erotas" by Marlain Angelidou, receiving only two points. In 2005, "Ela Ela (Come Baby)" performed by Constantinos Christoforou placed 18th in the final.

As part of its duties as participating broadcaster, CyBC organises the selection of its entry in the Eurovision Song Contest and broadcasts the event in the country. CyBC confirmed their intentions to participate in the 2006 contest on 24 September 2005. The broadcaster had previously used various methods to select its entry, such as internal selections and televised national finals to choose the performer, song or both; for example, in 2005, the broadcaster internally selected the artist and organised a national final to select the song. For this year, CyBC opted to organise a national final to select both the artist and song for the contest.

== Before Eurovision ==
=== A Song for Europe ===
A Song for Europe (Greek: Ένα τραγούδι για την Ευρώπη, Ena tragoudi gia tin Evropi) was the national final format developed by CyBC to select its entry for the Eurovision Song Contest 2006. The event took place at the CyBC Studio 3 in Nicosia and was hosted by Alex Michael and Christina Marouchou. It was broadcast in Cyprus on RIK 1 and RIK Sat, in Greece on ERT Sat, and online via CyBC's website cybc.cy. A Song for Europe consisted of 20 entries competing over three shows: two semi-finals on 11 and 12 February 2006, and the final on 22 February 2006. Each semi-final included ten entries, of which the top five progressed to the final. In the final, the winner was selected from the remaining ten entries. The results of each of the three shows were determined exclusively by televoting. In the final, the voting results of each of the five regions in Cyprus were converted to points from 1–8, 10, and 12 and assigned to the ten entries, while a sixth set of votes was based on the overall voting result.

==== Competing entries ====
Artists and composers were able to submit their entries to the broadcaster between 24 September and 30 December 2005. At the conclusion of the deadline, 114 entries were received by CyBC and the 20 selected entries were announced on 4 January 2006. Among the competing artists was Marios Tofi (who represented Cyprus in the Junior Eurovision Song Contest 2004). Selected songwriters included Peter Yiannakis (who co-composed the 1986 Cypriot Eurovision entry), and Mike Connaris (who composed the 2004 Cypriot Eurovision entry). Nine of the announced entries were later disqualified from the competition and replaced by an additional nine entries. The disqualified entries had either been submitted to other broadcasters participating in the 2006 contest or had been released before the broadcast of their respective semi-finals.

Competing entries
| Artist | Song | Songwriter(s) |
|---|---|---|
| Andreas Konstatinidis | "Love on the Weekend" | Michalis Rousos, John Vickers |
| Annet Artani | "Why Angels Cry" | Peter Yiannakis |
| Antonis Poorkou and Elena Georgiou | "To s'agapo" (Το σ'αγαπώ) | Antonis Poorkou, Elena Georgiou |
| Constantinos Andronikou | "Everytime I Close My Eyes" | Konstantinos Andronikou, Giorgos Ktorides |
| Eleftheria feat. Maria Zorli | "Play That Melody to Me" | Eric Babak |
| Eleni Andreou | "Just Your Smile" | Valeria Partali |
| Eleni Skarpari | "Don't Crack Now" | Mike Connaris, Paul Brown |
| Evagoras Evagorou and Chrisi Andreou | "Land of Yesterday" | Petros Moschovakis, Joyce Kokkinou, Michalis Hadjimichail |
| Giorgos Gavriel | "If You Asked Me to Lie" | Matheson Bayley |
| Heleni and the Jetz | "Invincible" | Mike Connaris, Tarn-Marie Taylor |
| Irini Athanassiou | "Just a Dance" | Marios Anastasiou, Christina Georgiou |
| Lefki Stylianou | "Lost in Love" | Lefki Stylianou, Antreas Paraskeva |
| Liana | "I Need You to Need Me" | Michael Neofitou, Sotira Hadjipanayi |
| Lizzi Marcroft | "When I See You Dreamin'" | Dimitris Laskaridis, Lizzi Marcroft |
| Marina Solonos | "I'm a Fighter" | John Themis, Rachel Charles, Marina Solonos |
| Marios Tofi | "Congratulations" | Christodoulos Siganos, Valentino |
| Nick Nikolaou and Viky Anastasiou | "Funky" | Christos Kiriakidis |
| Patrick Babak | "We All Are Heroes" | Eric Babak, Patrick Babak |
| Theodoti Alexandrou | "Night's Shadows" | Fotis Mousoulidis, Kiriakos Pastides |
| Valando Tryfonos | "After You" | Giannis Charalampous, Natasa Tyrimou, Valando Tryfonos |

==== Semi-finals ====
The two semi-finals took place on 11 and 12 February 2006. In each semi-final, ten entries competed and a public televote selected five to progress to the final. In addition to the performances of the competing entries, the first semi-final featured guest performances by Azúcar Moreno (who represented Spain in 1990) and Chiara (who represented Malta in 1998 and in 2005), while the second semi-final featured guest performances by Maro Litra and Nicki French (who represented the United Kingdom in 2000).

Semi-final 1 – 11 February 2006
| R/O | Artist | Song | Result |
|---|---|---|---|
| 1 | Andreas Konstatinidis | "Love on the Weekend" | Qualified |
| 2 | Marina Solonos | "I'm a Fighter" | Qualified |
| 3 | Heleni and the Jetz | "Invincible" | —N/a |
| 4 | Eleni Andreou | "Just Your Smile" | Qualified |
| 5 | Irini Athanassiou | "Just a Dance" | —N/a |
| 6 | Giorgos Gavriel | "If You Asked Me to Lie" | —N/a |
| 7 | Liana | "I Need You to Need Me" | —N/a |
| 8 | Lizzi Marcroft | "When I See You Dreamin'" | —N/a |
| 9 | Nick Nikolaou and Vicky Anastassiou | "Funky" | Qualified |
| 10 | Annet Artani | "Why Angels Cry" | Qualified |

Semi-final 2 – 12 February 2006
| R/O | Artist | Song | Result |
|---|---|---|---|
| 1 | Eleftheria feat. Maria Zorli | "Play That Melody to Me" | Qualified |
| 2 | Lefki Stylianou | "Lost in Love" | —N/a |
| 3 | Evagoras Evagorou and Chrisi Andreou | "Land of Yesterday" | Qualified |
| 4 | Theodoti Alexandrou | "Night's Shadows" | —N/a |
| 5 | Marios Tofi | "Congratulations" | Qualified |
| 6 | Constantinos Andronikou | "Everytime I Close My Eyes" | Qualified |
| 7 | Patrick Babak | "We All Are Heroes" | —N/a |
| 8 | Antonis Poorkou and Elena Georgiou | "To s'agapo" | —N/a |
| 9 | Valando Tryfonos | "After You" | Qualified |
| 10 | Eleni Skarpari | "Don't Crack Now" | —N/a |

==== Final ====
The final took place on 22 February 2006. The ten remaining entries competed and the winner, "Why Angels Cry" performed by Annet Artani, was selected by a regional televote. Artani was born in New York, had taken part in the Greek reality singing show Fame Story, and had performed as a backing vocalist for Britney Spears in the past. She also wrote Spears' song "Everytime" (2004). "Why Angels Cry" is a ballad; in an interview, Artani said it was about "finding peace around the world, ending war, ending sadness, ending pain". The song was written by Peter Yiannakis, who co-wrote Cyprus's 1986 entry "Tora zo". In addition to the performances of the competing entries, the show featured guest performances by singer Stavros Konstantinou, Linda Martin (who represented Ireland in 1984 and in 1992), and Fabrizio Faniello (who represented Malta in 2001 and would represent Malta in 2006).

Final – 22 February 2006
| R/O | Artist | Song | Points | Place |
|---|---|---|---|---|
| 1 | Eleftheria feat. Maria Zorli | "Play That Melody to Me" | 32 | 7 |
| 2 | Marina Solonos | "I'm a Fighter" | 23 | 9 |
| 3 | Annet Artani | "Why Angels Cry" | 51 | 1 |
| 4 | Evagoras Evagorou and Chrisi Andreou | "Land of Yesterday" | 44 | 3 |
| 5 | Andreas Konstantinidis | "Love on the Weekend" | 35 | 5 |
| 6 | Marios Tofi | "Congratulations" | 46 | 2 |
| 7 | Constantinos Andronikou | "Everytime I Close My Eyes" | 25 | 8 |
| 8 | Eleni Andreou | "Just Your Smile" | 17 | 10 |
| 9 | Nick Nikolaou and Viky Anastasiou | "Funky" | 34 | 6 |
| 10 | Valando Tryfonos | "After You" | 41 | 4 |

=== Controversy ===
Following the Cypriot national final, seven of the 10 finalists filed a formal complaint to CyBC requesting clarifications on the voting process as they had not been notified of the exact way the votes would be calculated prior to the competition; the regulations published by the broadcaster did not mention that the televoting results for the final would be calculated based on regions and the details of the final results were never revealed. Claims that the victory was rigged for Artani due to her popularity were also made by some of the finalists.

After an investigation by the Cypriot government, the Commissioner for Administration, Eliana Nikolaou, deemed the complaints valid in January 2007, as a regional televoting system was not possible for the nation due to lack of coverage from the telephone company. It was noted that only votes submitted via landline were counted for Paralimni and Paphos, while votes submitted via mobile phones were counted for Larnaca and Limassol. The controversy led to CyBC selecting both the artist and song via an internal selection for the 2007 contest.

=== Promotion ===
Artani made several appearances across Europe specifically to promote "Why Angels Cry" as the Cypriot Eurovision entry. On 15 March, she performed the song during the Greek Eurovision national final Feel the Party. She also took part in promotional activities across several European countries, including in Malta, where she was interviewed by the local press and was the main guest of the show Eurovision Fever on 29 March, and in Bosnia and Herzegovina on 28 April, where she appeared at the Eurovision Special Feminnem Show. Prior to the contest, "Why Angels Cry" was included on Artani's album Mia foni, which was released in early April 2006. CyBC hosted a farewell party to send off Artani on 6 May. The event, which took place in Nicosia, included entrants from several other participating countries and was hosted by prior Cypriot entrant Christoforou. Once in Athens for the contest, a Cypriot welcome party was held on 14 May and was attended by entrants from Albania, Belgium, and Turkey.

== At Eurovision ==
The Eurovision Song Contest 2006 took place at the O.A.C.A. Olympic Indoor Hall in Athens, Greece and consisted of a semi-final on 18 May, and the final on 20 May 2006. Both the semi-final and the final were broadcast on television in Cyprus on RIK 1 and RIK SAT, with commentary by Evi Papamichael.

All participating nations, with the exceptions of the host country, the "Big Four" (France, Germany, Spain and the United Kingdom) and the ten highest placed finishers in the 2005 contest were required to qualify from the 18 May semi-final to compete for the 20 May final; the top ten countries from the semi-final then progressed to the final. Cyprus' 18th-place finish in 2005 meant it would need to participate in the semi-final this year. The running order for the semi-final was determined through an allocation draw held on 21 March 2006, wherein it was determined that Cyprus would perform in position 9, following the entry from Ireland and preceding the entry from Monaco.

Artani took part in technical rehearsals on 11 and 13 May, followed by dress rehearsals on 17 and 18 May. She was joined on stage by five backing vocalists as gospel singers: Konstantinos Andronikou, Keanna Johnson, Anna Iliadou, Riana Athanasiou, and Giorgos Georgiou. For her performance, she stood with one backing vocalist immediately behind her while the other four stood on a platform up higher behind her. Following the semi-final performance, Cyprus was not announced among the top 10 entries and therefore failed to qualify to compete in the final. It was later revealed that Cyprus placed 15th in the semi-final, receiving a total of 57 points.

=== Voting ===
Below is a breakdown of points awarded to Cyprus and awarded by Cyprus in the semi-final and final of the contest. The nation awarded its 12 points to Armenia in the semi-final and to Greece in the final of the contest. CyBC appointed Constantinos Christoforou (who represented Cyprus in 1996, in 2002, and in 2005) as its spokesperson to announce the Cypriot votes during the final.

==== Points awarded to Cyprus ====
Points awarded to Cyprus (Semi-final)
| Score | Country |
|---|---|
| 12 points | Greece |
| 10 points | Monaco |
| 8 points | |
| 7 points | Armenia; United Kingdom |
| 6 points | |
| 5 points | |
| 4 points | Albania; Malta; Romania |
| 3 points | Ukraine |
| 2 points | Bulgaria; Germany |
| 1 point | Belarus; Switzerland |

==== Points awarded by Cyprus ====
Points awarded by Cyprus (Semi-final)
| Score | Country |
|---|---|
| 12 points | Armenia |
| 10 points | Russia |
| 8 points | Bulgaria |
| 7 points | Finland |
| 6 points | Ukraine |
| 5 points | Bosnia and Herzegovina |
| 4 points | Lithuania |
| 3 points | Netherlands |
| 2 points | Sweden |
| 1 point | Belgium |

Points awarded by Cyprus (Final)
| Score | Country |
|---|---|
| 12 points | Greece |
| 10 points | Romania |
| 8 points | Russia |
| 7 points | Armenia |
| 6 points | Ukraine |
| 5 points | Finland |
| 4 points | Lithuania |
| 3 points | Switzerland |
| 2 points | Bosnia and Herzegovina |
| 1 point | United Kingdom |

== Bibliography ==
- O'Connor, John Kennedy (2010). The Eurovision Song Contest: The Official History (2nd ed.). London: Carlton Books. ISBN 978-1-84732-521-1.
