= Turkey in the Eurovision Song Contest 2006 =

- Eurovision Song Contest 2006
- Participating broadcaster: Türkiye Radyo ve Televizyon Kurumu (TRT)
- Country: Turkey
- Selection process: Internal selection
- Announcement date: Artist: 5 January 2006; Song: 4 March 2006

Competing entry
- Song: "Superstar"
- Artist: Sibel Tüzün
- Songwriters: Sibel Tüzün

Placement
- Semi-final result: Qualified (8th, 91 points)
- Final result: 11th, 91 points

Participation chronology

Turkey was represented at the Eurovision Song Contest 2006 with the song "Superstar" written and performed by Sibel Tüzün. The Turkish participating broadcaster, Türkiye Radyo ve Televizyon Kurumu (TRT), internally selected its entry for the contest. The announcement of Sibel Tüzün occurred on 5 January 2006, while her song, "Superstar", was presented to the public on 4 March 2006.

Turkey competed in the semi-final of the Eurovision Song Contest which took place on 18 May 2006. Performing during the show in position 14, "Superstar" was announced among the top 10 entries of the semi-final and therefore qualified to compete in the final on 20 May. It was later revealed that Turkey placed eighth out of the 23 participating countries in the semi-final with 91 points. In the final, Turkey performed in position 23 and placed eleventh out of the 24 participating countries, scoring 91 points.

== Background ==
Prior to the 2006 contest, Türkiye Radyo ve Televizyon Kurumu (TRT) had participated in the Eurovision Song Contest representing Turkey 27 times since its first entry in 1975. It missed the 1979 contest because Arab countries pressured the Turkish government to withdraw from the contest because of the dispute over the Status of Jerusalem, and the 1994 contest due to a poor average score from the preceding contests, which ultimately led to relegation. It had won the contest once: in 2003 with the song "Everyway That I Can" performed by Sertab Erener. Its least successful result was in 1987 when the song "Şarkım Sevgi Üstüne" by Seyyal Taner and Lokomotif, placed 22nd (last) receiving 0 points in total. In 2005 the song "Rimi Rimi Ley" performed by Gülseren placed 13th.

As part of its duties as participating broadcaster, TRT organises the selection of its entry in the Eurovision Song Contest and broadcasts the event in the country. The broadcaster has used various methods to select its entry in the past, such as internal selections and televised national finals. In 2005, TRT organised a national final to select its entry. However, in 2006, the broadcaster opted to internally select both the artist and song.

== Before Eurovision ==
=== Internal selection ===
On 5 January 2006, TRT announced that it had internally selected Sibel Tüzün as its representative in the Eurovision Song Contest 2006. Following the artist announcement, Tüzün submitted three songs, all written by herself in Turkish, to TRT for consideration and a 11-member selection committee selected her contest entry on 4 February 2006. The committee consisted of Muhsin Mete (TRT Deputy General Manager), Süleyman Erguner (TRT Head of Music), Muharrem Sevil (TRT Head of Television), Muhsin Yıldırım (Ankara Television director), Deniz Çakmakoğlu (TRT Deputy Head of Music), Asım Tokel (TRT Deputy Head of Music), Ümran Sönmezer (TRT polyphonic music director), Hasan Taş (Ankara Television Head of Music), Neşet Ruacan (conductor of the TRT Istanbul Light Music and Jazz Orchestra), Kamil Özler (member of the TRT Istanbul Light Music and Jazz Orchestra) and Sibel Tüzün.

The song Sibel Tüzün would perform at the contest, "Superstar", was presented to the public on 4 March 2006 during a press conference that took place at the TRT Tepebaşı Studios in Istanbul and was broadcast on TRT 1 as well as TRT Int. The music video for the song, directed by Engin Güven and involved Tüzün wearing a red hat with the Turkish flag on it, was also presented during the show. "Superstar" is a disco themed song with oriental elements, which Tüzün described as "slightly ostentatious, energetic and supple".

== At Eurovision ==
The Eurovision Song Contest 2006 took place at the Olympic Indoor Arena in Athens, Greece.

According to Eurovision rules, all nations with the exceptions of the host country, the "Big Four" (France, Germany, Spain and the United Kingdom) and the ten highest placed finishers in the 2005 contest are required to qualify from the semi-final on 18 May 2006 in order to compete for the final on 20 May 2006; the top ten countries from the semi-final progress to the final. On 21 March 2006, an allocation draw was held which determined the running order for the semi-final and Turkey was set to perform in position 14, following the entry from Russia and before the entry from Ukraine. At the end of the semi-final, Turkey was announced as having finished in the top 10 and subsequently qualifying for the grand final. It was later revealed that Turkey placed eighth in the semi-final, receiving a total of 91 points. The draw for the running order for the final was done by the presenters during the announcement of the 10 qualifying countries during the semi-final and Turkey was drawn to perform in position 23, following the entry from Sweden and before the entry from Armenia. Turkey placed eleventh in the final, scoring 91 points.

Both the semi-final and the final was broadcast in Turkey on TRT 1 and TRT Int with commentary by Bülend Özveren. TRT appointed Meltem Ersan Yazgan as its spokesperson to announce the results of the Turkish televote during the final.

=== Voting ===
Below is a breakdown of points awarded to Turkey and awarded by Turkey in the semi-final and grand final of the contest. The nation awarded its 12 points to Bosnia and Herzegovina in the semi-final and the final of the contest.

==== Points awarded to Turkey ====
Points awarded to Turkey (Semi-final)
Score	Country
12 points	Bosnia and Herzegovina
10 points	France; Netherlands; Romania
8 points	Belgium; Germany; Macedonia; Switzerland
7 points	
6 points	Albania; Denmark
5 points	
4 points	
3 points	Israel
2 points	
1 point	Bulgaria; Norway

Points awarded to Turkey (Final)
Score	Country
12 points	France; Germany; Netherlands
10 points	Bosnia and Herzegovina; Switzerland
8 points	
7 points	Albania; Belgium
6 points	Romania
5 points	
4 points	Bulgaria; Macedonia
3 points	Greece; United Kingdom
2 points	
1 point	Israel

==== Points awarded by Turkey ====
Points awarded by Turkey (Semi-final)
Score	Country
12 points	Bosnia and Herzegovina
10 points	Armenia
8 points	Macedonia
7 points	Ukraine
6 points	Finland
5 points	Netherlands
4 points	Russia
3 points	Albania
2 points	Lithuania
1 point	Bulgaria

Points awarded by Turkey (Final)
Score	Country
12 points	Bosnia and Herzegovina
10 points	Armenia
8 points	Ukraine
7 points	Finland
6 points	Macedonia
5 points	Russia
4 points	Greece
3 points	Romania
2 points	Croatia
1 point	Moldova
