= Bosnia and Herzegovina in the Eurovision Song Contest 2006 =

- Eurovision Song Contest 2006
- Participating broadcaster: Radio and Television of Bosnia and Herzegovina (BHRT)
- Country: Bosnia and Herzegovina
- Selection process: Internal selection
- Announcement date: Artist: 9 February 2006; Song: 5 March 2006

Competing entry
- Song: "Lejla"
- Artist: Hari Mata Hari
- Songwriters: Željko Joksimović; Fahrudin Pecikoza; Dejan Ivanović

Placement
- Semi-final result: Qualified (2nd, 267 points)
- Final result: 3rd, 229 points

Participation chronology

Bosnia and Herzegovina was represented at the Eurovision Song Contest 2006 with the song "Lejla", composed by Željko Joksimović, with lyrics by Fahrudin Pecikoza and Dejan Ivanović, and performed by the band Hari Mata Hari. The Bosnian-Herzegovinian participating broadcaster, Radio and Television of Bosnia and Herzegovina (BHRT), internally selected its entry for the contest. The broadcaster announced Hari Mata Hari as its representative on 9 February 2006, and the song "Lejla", was presented to the public on 5 March 2006 during a show entitled BH Eurosong 2006. Songwriter Joksimović had represented Serbia and Montenegro in 2004.

Bosnia and Herzegovina competed in the semi-final of the Eurovision Song Contest which took place on 18 May 2006. Performing during the show in position 22, "Lejla" was announced among the top 10 entries of the semi-final and therefore qualified to compete in the final on 20 May. It was later revealed that Bosnia and Herzegovina placed second out of the 23 participating countries in the semi-final with 267 points. In the final, Bosnia and Herzegovina performed in position 13 and placed third out of the 24 participating countries, scoring 229 points. This marked Bosnia and Herzegovina's best placing in the history of the contest.

== Background ==
Prior to the 2006 contest, Radio and Television of Bosnia and Herzegovina (BHRT) and its predecessor national broadcasters, had participated in the Eurovision Song Contest representing Bosnia and Herzegovina eleven times since RTVBiH's first entry in 1993. Their best placing in the contest was seventh, achieved in 1999 with the song "Putnici" performed by Dino and Béatrice. Following the introduction of semi-finals for the 2004 contest, they have, up to this year, managed to qualify on each occasion they have participated and compete in the final. Their least successful result has been 22nd place, which they have achieved in 1996.

As part of its duties as participating broadcaster, BHRT organises the selection of its entry in the Eurovision Song Contest and broadcasts the event in the country. The broadcaster confirmed its intentions to participate at the 2006 contest on 5 January 2006. In 2005, BHRT had set up a national final to choose both the artist and song, while the entry was selected through an internal selection process in 2006. This marked the first time that both the artist and song was internally selected; previously the broadcaster had used a national final to choose the artist, song, or both to compete at the contest.

== Before Eurovision ==
=== Internal selection ===
BHRT directly invited composers to submit songs in one of the official languages of Bosnia and Herzegovina up until 23 January 2006. On 9 February 2006, the broadcaster announced that they had internally selected the band Hari Mata Hari to represent Bosnia and Herzegovina. The announcement occurred during a press conference which was held at the UNITIC center of the University of Sarajevo. Hari Mata Hari were due to represent Bosnia and Herzegovina in 1999 with the song "Starac i more" before its disqualification as the song was previously released in Finland in 1997. The twelve-member selection committee that determined Hari Mata Hari and the song to be performed at the contest, which was written by Željko Joksimović, Fahrudin Pecikoza and Dejan Ivanović, consisted of members of the Bosnian-Herzegovinian Delegation for the Eurovision Song Contest: Dejan Kukrić, Ninoslav Verber, Vesna Andree-Zaimović, Ivan Stojanović, Nermin Durmo, Elvir Leme, Slavi Ma, Milkica Grubor, Sabina Bačvić-Zečević, Ines Mrenica, Srđan Petković and Dženita Jusufbegović. Joksimović previously represented Serbia and Montenegro in 2004, placing second with the song "Lane moje".

The song, under three working titles "Lejla", "Sakrivena" and "Zar bi mogla ti drugog voljeti", was presented during a television special entitled BH Eurosong 2006 on 5 March 2006, which was held at the Sarajevo National Theatre and hosted by Mario Drmać and Dejan Kukrić. The show was broadcast on BHT 1 as well as streamed online via the broadcaster's website pbsbih.ba. In addition to the presentation of the song, the show featured guest performances by Željko Joksimović, Sabahudin Kurt (who represented Yugoslavia in 1964), Ambasadori (who represented Yugoslavia in 1976), Mija Martina (who represented Bosnia and Herzegovina in 2003), Deen (who represented Bosnia and Herzegovina in 2004), and Feminnem (who represented Bosnia and Herzegovina in 2005). Following the show, the public was able to vote for their favourite song title on pbsbih.ba and "Lejla" was selected with 3,501 votes; "Zar bi mogla ti drugog voljeti" received 660 votes and "Sakrivena" received 462 votes.

== At Eurovision ==
According to Eurovision rules, all nations with the exceptions of the host country, the "Big Four" (France, Germany, Spain and the United Kingdom) and the ten highest placed finishers in the 2005 contest are required to qualify from the semi-final on 18 May 2006 in order to compete for the final on 20 May 2006; the top ten countries from the semi-final progress to the final. On 21 March 2006, an allocation draw was held which determined the running order for the semi-final and Bosnia and Herzegovina was set to perform in position 22, following the entry from Estonia and before the entry from Iceland.

During Hari Mata Hari's performance at the contest, the band members were joined on stage by backing vocalists Ksenija Milošević and Ivana Čabraja. At the end of the semi-final, Bosnia and Herzegovina was announced as having finished in the top 10 and subsequently qualifying for the grand final. It was later revealed that Bosnia and Herzegovina placed second in the semi-final, receiving a total of 267 points. The draw for the running order for the final was done by the presenters during the announcement of the ten qualifying countries during the semi-final and Bosnia and Herzegovina was drawn to perform in position 13, following the entry from Romania and before the entry from Lithuania. Bosnia and Herzegovina placed third in the final, scoring 229 points. This gave Bosnia and Herzegovina their best ever placing in the contest.

The semi-final and the final were broadcast in Bosnia and Herzegovina on BHT 1 with commentary by Dejan Kukrić. BHRT appointed Vesna Andree-Zaimović as its spokesperson to announce the Bosnian-Herzegovinian votes during the final.

=== Voting ===
Below is a breakdown of points awarded to Bosnia and Herzegovina and awarded by Bosnia and Herzegovina in the semi-final and grand final of the contest. The nation awarded its 12 points to Turkey in the semi-final and to Croatia in the final of the contest.

==== Points awarded to Bosnia and Herzegovina ====
Points awarded to Bosnia and Herzegovina (Semi-final)
Score	Country
12 points	Croatia; Finland; Monaco; Norway; Romania; Serbia and Montenegro; Slovenia; Switzerland; Turkey
10 points	Albania; Bulgaria; Germany; Macedonia; Sweden
8 points	Denmark; Moldova; Netherlands; Ukraine
7 points	Iceland; Russia
6 points	Belgium; France; Greece; Ireland; Portugal
5 points	Armenia; Cyprus; Poland
4 points	United Kingdom
3 points	Belarus; Lithuania
2 points	Latvia; Malta
1 point	Andorra; Estonia; Israel; Spain

Points awarded to Bosnia and Herzegovina (Final)
Score	Country
12 points	Albania; Croatia; Macedonia; Monaco; Serbia and Montenegro; Slovenia; Switzerland; Turkey
10 points	Finland; Sweden; Ukraine
8 points	Denmark; Netherlands; Norway
7 points	Bulgaria; Germany; Romania
6 points	Belgium; France; Greece; Russia
5 points	Armenia; Moldova
4 points	Belarus; Lithuania; Poland
3 points	Iceland
2 points	Cyprus; Ireland; Israel; Portugal
1 point	Spain

==== Points awarded by Bosnia and Herzegovina ====
Points awarded by Bosnia and Herzegovina (Semi-final)
Score	Country
12 points	Turkey
10 points	Macedonia
8 points	Finland
7 points	Slovenia
6 points	Sweden
5 points	Albania
4 points	Russia
3 points	Ukraine
2 points	Lithuania
1 point	Iceland

Points awarded by Bosnia and Herzegovina (Final)
Score	Country
12 points	Croatia
10 points	Turkey
8 points	Macedonia
7 points	Finland
6 points	Russia
5 points	Ukraine
4 points	Switzerland
3 points	Sweden
2 points	Romania
1 point	Greece
