= Greece in the Eurovision Song Contest 2006 =

- Eurovision Song Contest 2006
- Participating broadcaster: Hellenic Broadcasting Corporation (ERT)
- Country: Greece
- Selection process: Artist: Internal selection Song: Feel the Party
- Selection date: Artist: 24 January 2006; Song: 14 March 2006

Competing entry
- Song: "Everything"
- Artist: Anna Vissi
- Songwriters: Nikos Karvelas; Anna Vissi

Placement
- Final result: 9th, 128 points

Participation chronology

Greece was represented at the Eurovision Song Contest 2006 with the song "Everything", composed by Nikos Karvelas, with lyrics by Anna Vissi, and performed by Vissi herself. The Greek participating broadcaster, the Hellenic Broadcasting Corporation (ERT), selected its entry through a four-song national final titled Feel the Party on 14 March 2006, after having previously selected the performer internally. In addition, ERT was also the host broadcaster and staged the event at the Olympic Indoor Hall in Athens after winning the previous edition with the song "My Number One" by Helena Paparizou.

To promote the entry, Vissi made appearances across Europe in countries that take part in the contest, including events in Belgium, Greece, Russia, Malta, Cyprus, Albania, Serbia and Montenegro, Bosnia and Herzegovina, Romania, and Sweden. In addition, her most recent album at the time, Nylon, was re-released as a "Euro Edition", including her entry as well as the other three songs from the national final. As the host nation, Greece was prequalified for the 20 May Eurovision final. Performing 16th on the night, the nation placed ninth out if the 24 entries, receiving 128 points.

== Background ==
Prior to the 2006 contest, Greece had participated in the Eurovision Song Contest 27 times since its first entry in 1974. It won for the first time in 2005 with the song "My Number One" performed by Helena Paparizou, and had placed third on two occasions by this point: in 2001 with the song "Die for You" performed by the duo Antique and in 2004 with "Shake It" performed by Sakis Rouvas. Following the introduction of semi-finals for the 2004 contest, Greece had a top ten placing each year. Its least successful result was in 1998 when it placed 20th with the song "Mia krifi evaisthisia" by Thalassa, receiving only twelve points in total, all from Cyprus.

As part of its duties as participating broadcaster, the Hellenic Broadcasting Corporation (ERT) organises the selection of its entry in the Eurovision Song Contest and broadcasts the event in the country. From 2001 to 2003, ERT held a national final with several artists, but for 2004 and 2005, it selected high-profile artists internally and set up national finals to choose their song. ERT continued the internal selection of the artist for 2006 and subsequently held a national final to select the song.

== Before Eurovision ==
=== Artist selection ===
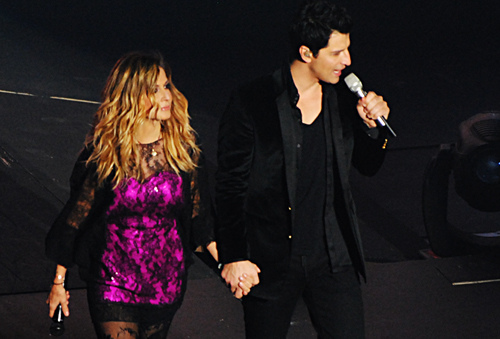
Anna Vissi and Sakis Rouvas (seen performing in 2011) took part in ERT's artist selection process.

ERT announced that it would be selecting their artist for the Eurovision Song Contest 2006 internally. Sakis Rouvas was again approached by ERT in August or September 2005, however, he declined as there was no reason for him to go especially when Greece was the reigning champion (making chances of winning little to none), despite having considered it briefly. Nevertheless, Rouvas accepted to co-host the 2006 contest after ERT still wanted him involved in some way. On 27 November 2004, MAD TV reported that Despina Vandi, who had previously been asked in 2005, was seriously considering representing Greece in the 2006 contest after having possibly been approached by ERT.

On 12 December 2005, Star Channel reported that Anna Vissi, who previously stated that she "never [excludes] a Eurovision Song Contest participation as long as everything is organized well", would soon be approached by ERT. On 24 January 2006, ERT confirmed Anna Vissi as the Greek representative for the 2006 contest. Vissi had previously represented Greece in 1980 and Cyprus in 1982, placing thirteenth and fifth respectively. She had also attempted to take part in the contest in previous years, either failing to win against other artists or having deals not materializing. In a press interview, she said the final decision took so long to be announced because she was still debating entering, having to use opinion polls along with talking to her usual collaborators.

=== Feel the Party ===
Following the announcement of Anna Vissi as the Eurovision 2006 representative, ERT revealed that Vissi would perform four or five songs during a national final, titled Feel the Party. Four songs, three upbeat songs and a ballad, were ultimately selected and announced on 10 March 2006.

The final took place on 14 March 2006 at the Votanikos Music Hall in Athens, hosted by Giorgos Kapoutzidis and Zeta Makripoulia. Anna Vissi performed all four songs and the winning song, "Everything", was selected by a combination of public voting (60%) and jury voting (40%). The jury consisted of Mimis Plessas, Antonis Andrikakis, Dimitris Starovas, Themos Anastasiadis, Christina Politi, Evangelia Piskera, Antonis Karatzikos, Rena Kapitsala, and a ninth aggregate press jury vote consisting of Sietse Bakker (ESCToday) and Fotis Konstantopoulos (Oikotimes). Public voting was conducted through telephone or SMS and over 200,000 viewers voted. After the announcement of "Everything" as the winning song, Vissi pledged to sing the song "from the heart and give all her best for Greece". She also stated that she liked all four songs.

In addition to the performances of the competing entries, the interval acts featured guest performances by Annet Artani (who would represent Cyprus in 2006), Fabrizio Faniello (who would represent Malta in 2006), Christine Guldbrandsen (who would represent Norway in 2006), Mihai Trăistariu (who would represent Romania in 2006), and Sibel Tüzün (who would represent Turkey in 2006). A compilation of former Greek Eurovision entries such as "Mathima solfege", "Stop", "I Anixi", and "(I Would) Die for You" were shown on a large screen along with a video message by 2006 Eurovision host Maria Menounos as well as personal messages from former Greek Eurovision representatives Sakis Rouvas, Helena Paparizou, and Nana Mouskouri.

Results of Feel the Party – 14 March 2006
R/O	Song	Songwriter(s)	Jury (40%)	Televote (60%)	Average	Place
1	"Beautiful Night"	Pegasos (Antonis and Dimitris Papavomvolakis)	9.39%	16.32%	12.16%	4
2	"Who Cares About Love"	Nikos Karvelas	24.43%	7.25%	13.72%	3
3	"Welcome to the Party"	Dimitris Kontopoulos, Dimitris S.	24.27%	27.69%	26.32%	2
4	"Everything"	Nikos Karvelas, Anna Vissi	35.98%	55.66%	47.79%	1

=== Promotion ===
Before her appearance at the contest, Vissi went on a promotional tour, singing her song in several Eurovision countries. The first stop was Moscow on 25 March 2006, Greek Independence Day, and she attended a reception at the Greek embassy. She stayed for three days, gave seven television appearances and three newspaper interviews, and posed for several magazines. Following Russia, Vissi traveled to Malta and then Cyprus where she performed at a large club in Nicosia. Cyprus was followed by Albania, where she appeared at the "Albania Awards Kult", an awards show, and also gave a few interviews. The next stop was Serbia and Montenegro, followed by Romania. By the end of April, Vissi had visited Sweden where she gave several more interviews to the local press. Bosnia and Herzegovina was next at the beginning of May, followed by Belgium on the fourth. She met with Greek Orthodox Metropolitan Panteleimon of Belgium to whom she offered an autographed copy of the CD single for "Everything" after having spoken to the media. Vissi then attended a reception at the Greek embassy before meeting up with Belgium's Eurovision entrant Kate Ryan, with whom she visited a chocolate museum. After Belgium, Vissi returned to Greece for a break before leaving for Israel, the last stop on the tour, where she remained for ten days. Coinciding with the international promotional tour, on 25 April 2006 Vissi re-released her most recent album at the time, Nylon, as Nylon: Euro Edition, to include the four tracks from the national final.

== At Eurovision ==
The Eurovision Song Contest 2006 took place at the O.A.C.A. Olympic Indoor Hall in Athens, Greece, and consisted of a semi-final on 18 May and the final on 20 May 2006. According to the Eurovision rules at the time, all participating countries, except the host nation and the "Big Four", consisting of France, Germany, Spain and the United Kingdom, were required to qualify from the semi-final to compete for the final, although the top 10 countries from the semi-final progress to the final. As the winning country of the 2005 edition, Greece was automatically qualified for the final of the 2006 contest, and was drawn to present its song 16th on the night of the final, after the United Kingdom and before Finland. The semi-final and final were broadcast live in Greece, with commentary during the shows provided by Giorgos Kapoutzidis and Zeta Makripoulia on television and Maria Kozakou on radio.

At a press conference on 16 May, Anna Vissi thanked her fans and God for everything that had been given to her. She also explained how important the competition was to her, saying that she "really, really [wants] to win". She received several gifts from journalists and fans. "Everything" was considered a favorite at the contest, placing in the top three in a majority of fan polls and first in online betting houses. A British commentator for the semi-final stated that "she's massive in Greece, she's even bigger than the country itself". Vissi took part in technical rehearsals on 15 and 16 May, followed by dress rehearsals on 19 and 20 May. "None of the rehearsals were attended by so many people as Anna Vissi's", noted Sietse Bakker, one of the jury members from the national final. "Not only a large amount of fans and journalists took seat in the arena [...] but the president of Greek broadcaster ERT also entered the arena to see how 'his' artist was doing".

At the final, held on 20 May 2006, Anna Vissi appeared on stage surrounded by a fog effect created by dry ice. She was alone on the large stage and wore an exclusive Jean Paul Gaultier black and white outfit with black leggings. By the end of the song, she was down on her knees singing. Her choreography for the final was arranged by Mia Michaels. Although considered a favorite, she finished in ninth position, making Greece only one of two automatic finalists that managed a top 10 position. The entry received 128 points, including the maximum 12 points from Bulgaria and Cyprus. The ninth-place finish guaranteed Greece a place in the final of the Eurovision Song Contest 2007, held the next year.

=== Voting ===
Below is a breakdown of points awarded to Greece in the final, as well as by the country in the semi-final and final of the contest.

==== Points awarded to Greece ====
Points awarded to Greece (Final)
Score	Country
12 points	Bulgaria; Cyprus
10 points	Belgium; Romania
8 points	Albania; Armenia; Germany; Malta
7 points	Macedonia; United Kingdom
6 points	Serbia and Montenegro
5 points	France; Netherlands; Switzerland
4 points	Sweden; Turkey
3 points	Lithuania
2 points	Belarus
1 point	Andorra; Bosnia and Herzegovina; Finland; Moldova

==== Points awarded by Greece ====
Points awarded by Greece (Semi-final)
Score	Country
12 points	Cyprus
10 points	Armenia
8 points	Finland
7 points	Albania
6 points	Bosnia and Herzegovina
5 points	Russia
4 points	Ukraine
3 points	Bulgaria
2 points	Poland
1 point	Lithuania

Points awarded by Greece (Final)
Score	Country
12 points	Finland
10 points	Armenia
8 points	Russia
7 points	Romania
6 points	Bosnia and Herzegovina
5 points	Ukraine
4 points	Lithuania
3 points	Turkey
2 points	Norway
1 point	Moldova
