= Spain in the Eurovision Song Contest 2006 =

- Eurovision Song Contest 2006
- Participating broadcaster: Televisión Española (TVE)
- Country: Spain
- Selection process: Internal selection
- Announcement date: 27 February 2006

Competing entry
- Song: "Un Blodymary"
- Artist: Las Ketchup
- Songwriters: Manuel Ruiz Gómez "Queco"

Placement
- Final result: 21st, 18 points

Participation chronology

Spain was represented at the Eurovision Song Contest 2006 with the song "Un Blodymary", written by Manuel Ruiz Gómez "Queco", and performed by the group Las Ketchup. The Spanish participating broadcaster, Televisión Española (TVE), internally selected both the song and the performers as it entry for the contest. "Un Blodymary" by Las Ketchup was presented to the public as the Spanish entry on 27 February 2006 during the evening magazine programme España Directo.

As a member of the "Big Four", Spain automatically qualified to compete in the final of the Eurovision Song Contest. Performing in position 6, Spain placed twenty-first out of the 24 participating countries with 18 points.

== Background ==
Prior to the 2006 contest, Televisión Española (TVE) had participated in the Eurovision Song Contest representing Spain forty-five times since its first entry in 1961. It has won the contest on two occasions: in 1968 with the song "La, la, la" performed by Massiel and in 1969 with the song "Vivo cantando" performed by Salomé, the latter having won in a four-way tie with France, the Netherlands, and the United Kingdom. It has also finished second four times, with "En un mundo nuevo" by Karina in 1971, "Eres tú" by Mocedades in 1973, "Su canción" by Betty Missiego in 1979, and "Vuelve conmigo" by Anabel Conde in 1995. In 2005, it placed twenty-first with the song "Brujería" performed by Son de Sol.

As part of its duties as participating broadcaster, TVE organises the selection of its entry in the Eurovision Song Contest and broadcasts the event in the country. TVE confirmed its intentions to participate at the 2006 contest on 16 December 2005. From 2000 to 2005, TVE had set up national finals with several artists to choose both the song and performer to compete at Eurovision for Spain, including the reality television music competition Operación Triunfo. For their 2006 entry, the broadcaster opted to select both the artist and song via an internal selection.

== Before Eurovision ==
=== Internal selection ===
A submission period was open from 16 December 2005 until 31 January 2006. Lyrics of the songs were required to be mainly in one of the official languages of Spain. At the conclusion of the submission period, 245 entries were received. Professionals at TVE evaluated the entries received and shortlisted four entries from 40 initially longlisted. The four acts were announced on 25 February 2006 during the La 1 evening magazine programme España Directo: Chenoa, Las Ketchup and former Eurovision contestants Azúcar Moreno which represented Spain in 1990 and David Civera who represented Spain in 2001.

On 27 February 2006, TVE announced during España Directo that they had internally selected the group Las Ketchup to represent Spain in Athens. The group consists of sisters Lucía, Lola and Pilar Muñoz, having been joined by fourth sister Rocío in 2006. During the programme, it was also revealed that Las Ketchup would sing the song "Un Blodymary", written by Manuel Ruiz Gómez "Queco" who had previously produced the Spanish entry in 2005.

=== Controversy ===
"Un Blodymary" was poorly received by Spanish Eurovision fans which believed that the song would not stand a chance at the contest. TVE was also accused of misleading the public throughout the selection process, including the publishment of a list of shortlisted artists that was denied by Chenoa and David Civera's record label Vale Music in a press release; the broadcaster would subsequently issue an apology to Vale Music for the "mistake not attributable to those in charge of the contest". There were also claims from the Spanish press before the official artist announcement that Las Ketchup had already been selected as the Spanish entrant. TVE initially denied such reports as speculation but was followed up with the announcement of the fake shortlist, thus leading to suspicions of fraud.

== At Eurovision ==
According to Eurovision rules, all nations with the exceptions of the host country, the "Big Four" (France, Germany, Spain and the United Kingdom) and the ten highest placed finishers in the 2005 contest are required to qualify from the semi-final in order to compete for the final; the top ten countries from the semi-final progress to the final. As a member of the "Big 4", Spain automatically qualified to compete in the final on 20 May 2006. In addition to their participation in the final, Spain is also required to broadcast and vote in the semi-final on 18 May 2006. During the running order draw for the semi-final and final on 21 March 2006, Spain was placed to perform in position 6 in the final, following the entry from Norway and before the entry from Malta. Spain placed twenty-first in the final, scoring 18 points.

In Spain, both the semi-final and the final were broadcast on La 1 with commentary by Beatriz Pécker. TVE appointed Sonia Ferrer as its spokesperson to announce the Spanish votes during the final. The broadcast of the final was watched by 4.892 million viewers in Spain with a market share of 38.9%. This represented an increase of 3.4% from the previous year with 720,000 more viewers.

=== Voting ===
Below is a breakdown of points awarded to Spain and awarded by Spain in the semi-final and grand final of the contest. The nation awarded its 12 points to Armenia in the semi-final and to Romania in the final of the contest.

==== Points awarded to Spain ====
Points awarded to Spain (Final)
Score	Country
12 points	Andorra
10 points	
8 points	
7 points	
6 points	Albania
5 points	
4 points	
3 points	
2 points	
1 point	

==== Points awarded by Spain ====
Points awarded by Spain (Semi-final)
Score	Country
12 points	Armenia
10 points	Finland
8 points	Andorra
7 points	Sweden
6 points	Iceland
5 points	Bulgaria
4 points	Poland
3 points	Ukraine
2 points	Belgium
1 point	Bosnia and Herzegovina

Points awarded by Spain (Final)
Score	Country
12 points	Romania
10 points	Finland
8 points	Armenia
7 points	Russia
6 points	Sweden
5 points	Germany
4 points	Lithuania
3 points	Ukraine
2 points	Moldova
1 point	Bosnia and Herzegovina
