= Macedonia in the Eurovision Song Contest 2006 =

- Eurovision Song Contest 2006
- Participating broadcaster: Macedonian Radio Television (MRT)
- Country: Macedonia
- Selection process: Nacionalen izbor na Pesna na Eurovizija 2006
- Selection date: 4 March 2006

Competing entry
- Song: "Ninanajna"
- Artist: Elena Risteska
- Songwriters: Darko Dimitrov; Rade Vrčakovski

Placement
- Semi-final result: Qualified (10th, 76 points)
- Final result: 12th, 56 points

Participation chronology

Macedonia (Note: Officially under the provisional appellation "former Yugoslav Republic of Macedonia", abbreviated "FYR Macedonia".) was represented at the Eurovision Song Contest 2006 with the song "Ninanajna" (Нинанајна), composed by Darko Dimitrov, with lyrics by Rade Vrčakovski, and performed by Elena Risteska. The Macedonian participating broadcaster, Macedonian Radio Television (MRT), organised the national final Specialen Evroviziski Den in order to select its entry for the contest. Twenty entries competed in the competition on 4 March 2006 where "Ninanajna" performed by Elena Risteska was selected exclusively by a public televote, receiving 6,999 votes.

Macedonia competed in the semi-final of the Eurovision Song Contest which took place on 18 May 2006. Performing during the show in position 11, "Ninanajna" was announced among the top 10 entries of the semi-final and therefore qualified to compete in the final on 20 May. It was later revealed that Macedonia placed tenth out of the 23 participating countries in the semi-final with 76 points. In the final, Macedonia performed in position 11 and placed twelfth out of the 24 participating countries, scoring 56 points. This remains the best result until 2019.

== Background ==
Prior to the 2006 contest, Macedonian Radio Television (MRT) had participated in the Eurovision Song Contest representing Macedonia five times since its first entry in 1998. Its best result in the contest to this point was fourteenth, achieved in 2004 with the song "Life" performed by Toše Proeski. Following the introduction of semi-finals for the 2004, it had featured in every final.

As part of its duties as participating broadcaster, MRT organises the selection of its entry in the Eurovision Song Contest and broadcasts the event in the country. The broadcaster had previously selected their entry for the contest through both national finals and internal selections. MRT confirmed its intentions to participate at the 2006 contest on 20 December 2005. Since 1996, the broadcaster selected its entries using a national final, a procedure that continued for its 2006 entry.

== Before Eurovision ==
=== Nacionalen izbor na Pesna na Eurovizija 2006 ===
Nacionalen izbor na Pesna na Eurovizija 2006 was the national final organised by MRT to select its entry for the Eurovision Song Contest 2006. Twenty entries participated in the competition which took place on 4 March 2006 at Studios 2 and 3 of MRT in Skopje, hosted by Biljana Dragičević and Zoran Ljutkov and was broadcast on MTV 1 and MTV Sat.

==== Competing entries ====
A submission period was opened for interested artists and composers to submit their songs between 20 December 2005 and 15 January 2006. MRT received 51 submissions at the closing of the deadline and twenty entries were selected by a four-member committee consisting of Ilija Pejovski (composer and conductor), Trajče Organdžiev (MRT), Avni Veliu (MRT) and Susana Pavlovska (MRT). The twenty competing artists and songs were announced on 23 January 2006 during a press conference.

Artist	Song	Songwriter(s)
Adnan	"Kje prespijam na kauč" (Ќе преспијам на кауч)	Aleksandar Ristovski-Princ
Adrijan and Esma	"Ljubov e..." (Љубов е...)	Jovan Jovanov, Elvir Mekić, Borče Nečovski
Arči	"Skokotaj me" (Скокоткај ме)	Alexandr Stefanovski-Jablan
Bagaž	"Mala odmazda" (Мала одмазда)	Trajko Karov, Aleksandar Stefanovski
Bojana Atanasovska	"Posle nas" (После нас)	Grigor Koprov, Ognen Nedelkovski
Bojana Atanasovska	"Svetlina" (Светлина)	Branka Kostić
Bojana Atanasovska	"Vo mojot son" (Во мојот сон)	Hari Kotlarovski, Kristijan Gabroski
Džoksi	"Zlatni žici" (Златни жици)	Džina Papas Džoksi, Ognen Nedelkovski
Elena Risteska	"Ninanajna" (Нинанајна)	Darko Dimitrov, Rade Vrčakovski
Enedin Biševac and Daria Ilievska	"Podaj raka" (Подај рака)	Enedin Biševac
Eva Nedinkovska	"Taan i med" (Таан и мед)	Garo Tavitjan, Kaliopi
Filip Jordanovski	"Bidi diva" (Биди дива)	Blaže Temelkov
Ibrahim Islamoski	"Zemi se" (Земи се)	Ibrahim Islamovski, Robert Milevski
Kaliopi	"Silna" (Силна)	Kaliopi
Lambe Alabakovski	"More od solzi" (Море од солзи)	Darko Dimitrov, Elena Risteska
Maja Odžaklievska	"Koj pat da izberam" (Кој пат да изберам)	Grigor Koprov, Ognen Nedelkovski
Nataša Gulevska	"Kje blesne zrak za nas" (Ќе блесне зрак за нас)	Nataša Gulevska, Ognen Nedelkovski
Nataša Mijatović	"Cvet vo postela" (Цвет во постела)	Nataša Mijatović
Panta Rei	"Mori mome" (Мори моме)	Koce Dinev, Aco Stoyanov
Petar Mehandžiski	"Moja najmila" (Моја најмила)	Jovan Vasilevski

==== Final ====
The final took place on 4 March 2006. The running order was determined through a draw held on 27 January 2006 during the MRT programme Urban Šik. Twenty entries competed and public televoting exclusively selected "Ninanajna" performed by Elena Risteska as the winner. In addition to the performances of the competing entries, the competition featured a guest performance by the Rebis Ballet Studio.

Final – 4 March 2006
R/O	Artist	Song	Televote	Place
1	Bojana Atanasovska	"Svetlina"	435	14
2	Eva Nedinkovska	"Taan i med"	631	10
3	Bagaž	"Mala odmazda"	189	19
4	Ibrahim Islamoski	"Zemi se"	1,976	5
5	Bojana Atanasovska	"Posle nas"	204	17
6	Kaliopi	"Silna"	1,700	6
7	Enedin Biševac and Daria Ilievska	"Podaj raka"	456	13
8	Nataša Mijatović	"Cvet vo postela"	1,052	8
9	Nataša Gulevska	"Kje blesne zrak za nas"	164	20
10	Bojana Atanasovska	"Vo mojot son"	473	12
11	Adrijan and Esma	"Ljubov e..."	6,866	2
12	Adnan	"Kje prespijam na kauč"	316	16
13	Filip Jordanovski	"Bidi diva"	202	18
14	Lambe Alabakovski	"More od solzi"	5,282	3
15	Petar Mehandžiski	"Moja najmila"	616	11
16	Džoksi	"Zlatni žici"	2,348	4
17	Elena Risteska	"Ninanajna"	6,999	1
18	Maja Odžaklievska	"Koj pat da izberam"	982	9
19	Arči	"Skokotaj me"	528	15
20	Panta Rei	"Mori mome"	1,105	7

=== Promotion ===
Elena Risteska specifically promoted "Ninanajna" as the Macedonian Eurovision entry on 11 March 2006 by performing the song during the Serbian-Montenegrin Eurovision national final Evropesma-Europjesma 2006.

== At Eurovision ==
According to Eurovision rules, all nations with the exceptions of the host country, the "Big Four" (France, Germany, Spain and the United Kingdom) and the ten highest placed finishers in the 2005 contest are required to qualify from the semi-final on 18 May 2006 in order to compete for the final on 20 May 2006; the top ten countries from the semi-final progress to the final. On 21 March 2006, a special allocation draw was held which determined the running order for the semi-final and Macedonia was set to perform in position 11, following the entry from Monaco and before the entry from Poland. At the end of the show, Macedonia was announced as having finished in the top 10 and subsequently qualifying for the grand final. It was later revealed that Macedonia placed tenth in the semi-final, receiving a total of 76 points. The draw for the running order for the final was done by the presenters during the announcement of the ten qualifying countries during the semi-final and Macedonia was drawn to perform in position 11, following the entry from Russia and before the entry from Romania. Macedonia placed twelfth in the final, scoring 56 points.

The semi-final and final were broadcast in Macedonia on MTV 1 and MTV Sat with commentary by Karolina Petkovska. MRT appointed Martin Vučić (who represented Macedonia in 2005) as its spokesperson to announce the Macedonian votes during the final.

=== Voting ===
Below is a breakdown of points awarded to Macedonia and awarded by Macedonia in the semi-final and grand final of the contest. The nation awarded its 12 points to Albania in the semi-final and to Bosnia and Herzegovina in the final of the contest.

==== Points awarded to Macedonia ====
Points awarded to Macedonia (Semi-final)
Score	Country
12 points	Albania
10 points	Bosnia and Herzegovina; Serbia and Montenegro
8 points	Armenia; Croatia; Slovenia; Turkey
7 points	
6 points	Switzerland
5 points	Bulgaria
4 points	
3 points	
2 points	
1 point	Romania

Points awarded to Macedonia (Final)
Score	Country
12 points	
10 points	
8 points	Bosnia and Herzegovina; Croatia; Serbia and Montenegro
7 points	Armenia
6 points	Bulgaria; Slovenia; Turkey
5 points	
4 points	Switzerland
3 points	Albania
2 points	
1 point	

==== Points awarded by Macedonia ====
Points awarded by Macedonia (Semi-final)
Score	Country
12 points	Albania
10 points	Bosnia and Herzegovina
8 points	Turkey
7 points	Finland
6 points	Bulgaria
5 points	Russia
4 points	Lithuania
3 points	Slovenia
2 points	Ukraine
1 point	Sweden

Points awarded by Macedonia (Final)
Score	Country
12 points	Bosnia and Herzegovina
10 points	Croatia
8 points	Russia
7 points	Greece
6 points	Finland
5 points	Ukraine
4 points	Turkey
3 points	Lithuania
2 points	Romania
1 point	Sweden
