= Treble (musical group) =

Dutch girl group

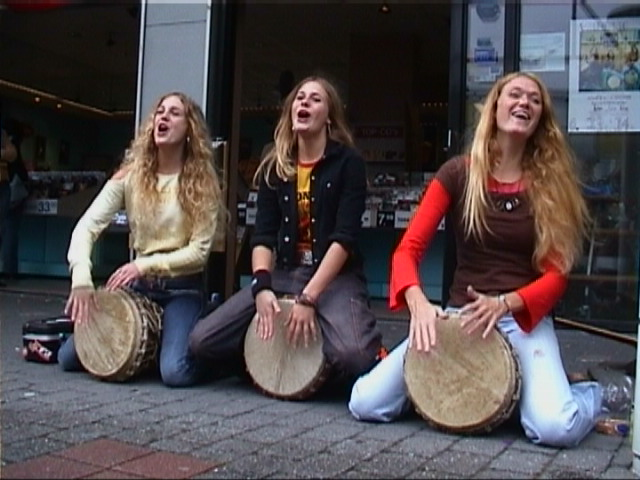
- Treble (2005)

Background information
- Origin: Netherlands
- Genres: Pop
- Years active: 2002–2010
- Label: CNR Entertainment
- Members: Caroline Hoffman; Niña van Dijk; Djem van Dijk

Treble was a girl group from the Netherlands.

== Career ==
The group started in 1995 when Caroline Hoffman (born 7 March 1975) and sisters Niña (born 26 May 1985) and Djem van Dijk (born 2 July 1987) met during a party, where Caroline was performing with a friend. The parents of the van Dijk sisters asked Caroline to become the music teacher of the two girls. A close-knit group was born, starting with street concerts where they accompanied themselves with acoustic guitar and djembe. Their harmonised and contagious African rhythm soon attracted a lot of attention. Treble is unique for its use of a fictitious language, called "Treble. As they put it, "In order to be able to get emotions across, music does not always require understandable language." The van Dijk sisters were in their early teens when the collaboration with Caroline started, and were therefore better able to pick up foreign languages. Although the girls have been singing in English and occasionally in French, the Treble language still is an integral and important part of their songwriting and performances.

After performing in the Netherlands and traveling abroad, the girls recorded their debut single "Ramaganana" at the end of 2003, which turned out to be the major breakthrough for the trio, reaching the number one slot on the Dutch singles Hit List. To promote the single, Treble hit the streets again. Performing with a placard requesting the listeners purchase their single and bring it to first place, they succeeded. In June 2004, their first album, No Trouble, made its debut. The girls, by then, had a record deal with CNR Music. Backed up by a group of session musicians they show the many different styles Treble has mastered, ranging from ballads to uptempo rock songs. The album is supported by a full theatre tour and several festival appearances. On stage the three girls are accompanied by a three-man live band: Olaf Fase (drums), Emanuel Platino (bass) and Willem Philips (guitar).

Their second album Free came out in April 2006. By then, the group has teamed up with World Sound Management from the US. The American management firm became interested in Treble when the group performed in France during Midem. In true Treble style, the girls weren't invited. They went to France and just hit the streets of Cannes without any planned gigs. The album is recorded in Hawaii and Los Angeles, under the guidance of Keith Olsen. His involvement lead to a much more coherent sound and the inclusion of the Fleetwood Mac song Crystal, which also was produced by Keith Olson in its original form. The band returns to familiar water when they went on a theatre tour (Omne trivium perfectum) and a full festival agenda. Treble will compete in the National Song Festival, which is the national final for the Eurovision Song Contest.

== Eurovision Song Contest 2006 ==
On 12 March 2006, an overwhelming victory at the National Song Festival in Amsterdam made Treble the Dutch representatives in the Eurovision Song Contest 2006 in Athens. During a live television show on the Dutch channel NOS, their song "Amambanda" was chosen as the best by 72% of the viewers. After this, Treble went on tour, planning to visit every country that was to send a contestant to Athens. They succeeded in doing so, but were unable to qualify for the final, finishing in 20th place in the semi-final.

== After Eurovision ==
The schedule for Treble after the Eurovision Song Contest was relatively unfruitful. A single "Fly" off the Free album was scheduled as a CD-single, but was later rescheduled to appear only as a download. yet another single "Leave Me Alone" was scheduled for 2006 but later postponed to early 2007.

Djem and Niña van Dijk have both enrolled in the Amsterdam Conservatorium to sharpen their musical skills reducing their participation in Treble. The band eventually split up in March 2010. Each of the girls have decided to make their own solo career in music.

== After break-up ==
Niña van Dijk took part in season 3 of the Voice of Holland in 2012 and was part of Team Marco Borsato but was eliminated after the first live show round (Top 32)

Awards and achievements
Preceded by Glennis Grace with "My Impossible Dream"	Netherlands in the Eurovision Song Contest; 2006	Succeeded by Edsilia Rombley with "On Top of the World"
