= Switzerland in the Eurovision Song Contest 2006 =

- Eurovision Song Contest 2006
- Participating broadcaster: Swiss Broadcasting Corporation (SRG SSR)
- Country: Switzerland
- Selection process: Internal selection
- Announcement date: Artist: 1 December 2005; Song: 18 March 2006

Competing entry
- Song: "If We All Give a Little"
- Artist: Six4one
- Songwriters: Ralph Siegel; Bernd Meinunger

Placement
- Final result: 16th, 30 points

Participation chronology

Switzerland was represented at the Eurovision Song Contest 2006 with the song "If We All Give a Little", composed by Ralph Siegel, with lyrics by Bernd Meinunger, and performed by the group Six4one (stylized as six4one). The Swiss participating broadcaster, the Swiss Broadcasting Corporation (SRG SSR), internally selected its entry for the contest in November 2005. "If We All Give a Little" was presented to the public on 18 March 2006.

As one of the ten highest placed finishers in 2005, Switzerland automatically qualified to compete in the final of the Eurovision Song Contest. Performing as the opening entry for the show in position 1, Switzerland placed sixteenth out of the 24 participating countries with 30 points.

== Background ==
Prior to the 2006 contest, the Swiss Broadcasting Corporation (SRG SSR) had participated in the Eurovision Song Contest representing Switzerland forty-six times since its first entry in 1956. It won that first edition of the contest with the song "Refrain" performed by Lys Assia. Its second victory was achieved in 1988 with the song "Ne partez pas sans moi" performed by Canadian singer Céline Dion. Following the introduction of semi-finals for the 2004, it had managed to participate in the final one time up to this point. In 2005, "Cool Vibes" performed by Vanilla Ninja qualified to the final where it placed 8th.

As part of its duties as participating broadcaster, SRG SSR organises the selection of its entry in the Eurovision Song Contest and broadcasts the event in the country. The broadcaster confirmed its intentions to participate at the 2006 contest on 22 July 2005. Along with its participation confirmation, it also announced that it would internally select its entry. SRG SSR has selected its entry for the Eurovision Song Contest through both national finals and internal selections in the past. Since 2005, it had internally selected its entry for the competition.

== Before Eurovision ==
=== Internal selection ===
On 22 July 2005, SRG SSR opened a submission period for interested composers to submit their songs until 14 October 2005. On 14 December 2005, the broadcaster announced that Ralph Siegel and Bernd Meinunger had written the song that would represent Switzerland. Siegel had previously composed 17 Eurovision entries for various countries, 14 of them which were written by Meinunger. Meinunger had also written the Swiss entry in 2005 (under the pseudonym John O'Flynn). The song was selected by a jury panel consisting of representatives of the three SRG SSR broadcasters: Swiss-German/Romansh broadcaster Schweizer Fernsehen der deutschen und rätoromanischen Schweiz (SF DRS), Swiss-French broadcaster Télévision Suisse Romande (TSR), and Swiss-Italian broadcaster Televisione svizzera di lingua italiana (TSI).

Performer auditions took place between 25 and 27 November 2005 at the Olympia Studios in Munich where Siegel together with an expert panel consisting of representatives of SF DRS, TSR and RSI selected six artists from six different countries to form the group Six4one for the Eurovision Song Contest. Eligible artists were those that have had television and stage experience (live performances), have made at least one video and have released at least one CD which placed among the top 50 in an official chart. Six4one consisted of Andreas Lundstedt (Sweden), Claudia D'Addio (Switzerland), Keith Camilleri (Malta), Liel Kolet (Israel), Marco Matias (Portugal) and Tinka Milinović (Bosnia and Herzegovina); several of the members have previously attempted to represent their respective countries at the Eurovision Song Contest: Lundstedt as a solo artist in 1996 and 1997 as well as in 2003 and 2005 as part of the group Alcazar, Camilleri in 2004 and 2005, Matias in 2005, and Milinović between 2002 and 2005. "If We All Give a Little" was presented to the public as the song on 18 March 2006 during the SF1 show Benissimo.

== At Eurovision ==
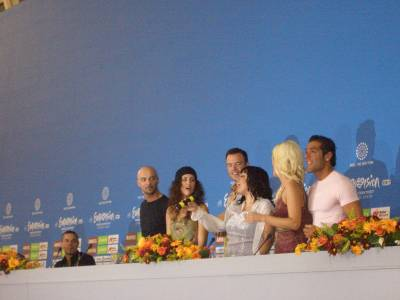
six4one during a press meet and greet

According to Eurovision rules, all nations with the exceptions of the host country, the "Big Four" (France, Germany, Spain and the United Kingdom) and the ten highest placed finishers in the 2005 contest are required to qualify from the semi-final in order to compete for the final; the top ten countries from the semi-final progress to the final. As one of the ten highest placed finishers in the 2005 contest, Switzerland automatically qualified to compete in the final on 20 May 2006. On 21 March 2006, a special allocation draw was held which determined the running order and Switzerland was set to open the final and perform in position 1, before the entry from Moldova. Switzerland placed sixteenth in the final, scoring 30 points.

In Switzerland, three broadcasters that form SRG SSR aired the contest. Sandra Studer (who represented Switzerland in 1991) provided German commentary both shows airing on SF zwei. Jean-Marc Richard and Alain Morisod provided French commentary on TSR 2 for the semi-final and on TSR 1 for the final. Sandy Altermatt and Claudio Lazzarino provided Italian commentary for the semi-final on TSI 2 and the final on TSI 1. SRG SSR appointed Jubaira Bachmann as its spokesperson to announce the Swiss votes during the final.

=== Voting ===
Below is a breakdown of points awarded to Switzerland and awarded by Switzerland in the semi-final and grand final of the contest. Notably, four of the six members of six4one came from countries that awarded points to Switzerland in the final (Malta, Bosnia and Herzegovina, Israel, and Portugal). These four countries together accounted for 21 of the 30 points received by Switzerland. The nation awarded its 12 points to Bosnia and Herzegovina in the semi-final and the final of the contest.

==== Points awarded to Switzerland ====
Points awarded to Switzerland (Final)
Score	Country
12 points	Malta
10 points	
8 points	
7 points	
6 points	Monaco
5 points	
4 points	Bosnia and Herzegovina; Israel
3 points	Cyprus
2 points	
1 point	Portugal

==== Points awarded by Switzerland ====
Points awarded by Switzerland (Semi-final)
Score	Country
12 points	Bosnia and Herzegovina
10 points	Albania
8 points	Turkey
7 points	Portugal
6 points	Macedonia
5 points	Finland
4 points	Sweden
3 points	Armenia
2 points	Ireland
1 point	Cyprus

Points awarded by Switzerland (Final)
Score	Country
12 points	Bosnia and Herzegovina
10 points	Turkey
8 points	Finland
7 points	Germany
6 points	Croatia
5 points	Greece
4 points	Macedonia
3 points	Ireland
2 points	Sweden
1 point	Romania
