= Poland in the Eurovision Song Contest 2006 =

- Eurovision Song Contest 2006
- Participating broadcaster: Telewizja Polska (TVP)
- Country: Poland
- Selection process: Piosenka dla Europy 2006
- Selection date: 28 January 2006

Competing entry
- Song: "Follow My Heart"
- Artist: Ich Troje
- Songwriters: André Franke; Michał Wiśniewski; O-Jay; William Lennox

Placement
- Semi-final result: Failed to qualify (11th)

Participation chronology

Poland was represented at the Eurovision Song Contest 2006 with the song "Follow My Heart", written by André Franke, Michał Wiśniewski, Jacek Łągwa, and Real McCoy, and performed by the band Ich Troje. The Polish participating broadcaster, Telewizja Polska (TVP), organised the national final Piosenka dla Europy 2006 in order to select its entry for the contest. The national final took place on 28 February 2006 and featured fifteen entries. "Follow My Heart" performed by Ich Troje was selected as the winner after gaining the most points following the combination of votes from a six-member jury panel and a public vote.

Poland competed in the semi-final of the Eurovision Song Contest which took place on 18 May 2006. Performing in position 12, "Follow My Heart" was not announced among the top 10 entries of the semi-final and therefore did not qualify to compete in the final. It was later revealed that Poland placed eleventh out of the 23 participating countries in the semi-final with 70 points.

== Background ==
Prior to the 2006 contest, Telewizja Polska (TVP) had participated in the Eurovision Song Contest representing Poland ten times since its first entry in 1994. Its highest placement in the contest, to this point, has been second place, achieved with its debut entry in 1994 with the song "To nie ja!" performed by Edyta Górniak. It has only, thus far, reached the top ten on one other occasion, when "Keine Grenzen – Żadnych granic" performed by Ich Troje finished seventh in 2003. In 2005, "Czarna dziewczyna" performed by Ivan and Delfin failed to qualify from the semi-final.

As part of its duties as participating broadcaster, TVP organises the selection of its entry in the Eurovision Song Contest and broadcasts the event in the country. The broadcaster confirmed its participation in the 2006 contest on 11 November 2005. In 2003 and 2004, TVP organised televised national finals that featured a competition among several artists and songs in order to select its entry. The broadcaster opted to internally select its 2005 entry, however, along with their participation confirmation, TVP announced that it would select its 2006 entry via a national final.

== Before Eurovision ==
=== Piosenka dla Europy 2006 ===
Piosenka dla Europy 2006 was the national final organised by TVP in order to select its entry for the Eurovision Song Contest 2006. The show took place on 28 January 2006 at the Studio 5 of TVP in Warsaw, hosted by Artur Orzech and Agnieszka Szulim. A combination of public televoting and jury voting selected the winner. The show was broadcast on TVP1 and TVP Polonia as well as streamed online at the broadcaster's website tvp.pl. The national final was watched by over 5 million viewers in Poland with a market share of 36%.

==== Competing entries ====
TVP opened a submission period for interested artists and songwriters to submit their entries between 11 November 2005 and 10 December 2005. The broadcaster received 112 submissions at the closing of the deadline. An eleven-member selection committee selected fifteen entries from the received submissions to compete in the national final. The selection committee consisted of Piotr Klatt (journalist and musician, managing editor at TVP1), Janusz Kosiński (editor at TVP and music journalist for Trójka and AntyRadio 94), Tomasz Deszczyński (President of OGAE Poland), Kamil Górecki (member of OGAE Poland), Bartek Jastrzębowski (television director), Zygmunt Kukla (conductor, music director of the Opole Festival and Sopot Festival), Paweł Rurak Sokal (musician and composer, represented Poland in 2004 as a member of Blue Café), Robert Sankowski (music journalist and reviewer for Gazeta Wyborcza), Maria Szabłowska (journalist at Polish Radio), Bogdan Olewicz (composer) and Andrzej Witkowski (editor for the Opole Festival and Sopot Festival at TVP). The selected entries were announced on 20 December 2005. Among the competing artists was the band Ich Troje (which represented Poland in 2003).

Artist	Song	Songwriter(s)
Agata Torzewska	"Goodbye"	Agata Torzewska, Gregorz Kopala
Brathanki	"W nas ciepło wiosen"	Zbigniew Książek
Danzel	"Undercover"	Johan Waem
Dezire	"Good Girl"	Ana Rusowicz, Bartek Gasiul, Filip Siejka, Maja Studzińska
Ha-Dwa-O	"Popatrz na mnie"	Sonia Neumann, Tomasz Konfederak, Bartosz Wielgosz
Ich Troje	"Follow My Heart"	André Franke, Michał Wiśniewski, Jacek Łągwa, Real McCoy
Katarzyna Cerekwicka	"Na kolana"	Katarzyna Cerekwicka, Piotr Siejka
Katarzyna Moś	"I Wanna Know"	Katarzyna Moś, Jacek Balon, Robert Janson
Kto To	"Zero do stracenia"	Slawomir Szudrowicz, Jerzy Delwo
Leonie Kuizenga	"Love Is What We All Need"	Jeremy Ebell, Leonie Kuizenga, Romeo Samuel, Sietse Bakker
Maciej Silski	"Za karę"	Maciej Silski, Michał Grymuza
Mosqitoo	"Jeżeli jesteś – wołam Cię"	Ania Dąbrowska, Monika Głębowicz, Rafał Malicki
Queens	"I Fell In Love"	Marcin Nierubiec
Sławomir Uniatowski	"Kocham Cię"	Janusz Onufrowicz, Piotr Kellaer
The Jet Set	"How Many People"	Kamil Varen, Tray, Mateusz Krezan

==== Final ====
The televised final took place on 28 January 2006. Fifteen entries competed and the winner, "Follow My Heart" performed by Ich Troje, was determined by a 50/50 combination of votes from a six-member professional jury and a public vote. The jury consisted of Maryla Rodowicz (singer), Maria Szabłowska (journalist at Polish Radio), Elżbieta Skrętkowska (creator of Szansa na sukces), Beata Drążkowska (member of OGAE Poland), Zygmunt Kukla (conductor, music director of the Opole Festival and Sopot Festival) and Robert Leszczyński (music journalist). Ich Troje and Katarzyna Cerekwicka were both tied for the first place with 17 points, however the results of the public vote took precedence and led to the victory of Ich Troje. In addition to the performances of the competing entries, the band Bajm and Blue Café (who represented Poland in 2004) performed as the interval acts.

Final – 28 January 2006
R/O	Artist	Song	Jury	Televote	Total	Place
1	Agata Torzewska	"Goodbye"	2	0	2	12
2	Danzel	"Undercover"	1	4	5	9
3	Katarzyna Moś	"I Wanna Know"	4	0	4	11
4	Maciej Silski	"Za karę"	3	1	4	10
5	Leonie Kuizenga	"Love Is What We All Need"	0	0	0	13
6	Ich Troje	"Follow My Heart"	5	12	17	1
7	Dezire	"Good Girl"	12	2	14	4
8	Ha-Dwa-O	"Popatrz na mnie"	0	0	0	13
9	Katarzyna Cerekwicka	"Na kolana"	10	7	17	2
10	Sławomir Uniatowski	"Kocham Cię"	7	6	13	5
11	Mosqitoo	"Jeżeli jesteś – wołam Cię"	0	0	0	13
12	Brathanki	"W nas ciepło wiosen"	0	5	5	8
13	The Jet Set	"How Many People"	8	8	16	3
14	Kto To	"Zero do stracenia"	6	3	9	7
15	Queens	"I Fell In Love"	0	10	10	6

== At Eurovision ==
According to Eurovision rules, all nations with the exceptions of the host country, the "Big Four" (France, Germany, Spain and the United Kingdom) and the ten highest placed finishers in the 2005 contest are required to qualify from the semi-final on 18 May 2006 in order to compete for the final on 20 May 2006; the top ten countries from the semi-final progress to the final. On 21 March 2006, an allocation draw was held which determined the running order for the semi-final and Poland was set to perform in position 12, following the entry from Macedonia and before the entry from Russia.

The semi-final and the final were broadcast in Poland on TVP1 and TVP Polonia with commentary by Artur Orzech. TVP appointed Maciej Orłoś as its spokesperson to announce the Polish votes during the final.

=== Semi-final ===
Ich Troje and Real McCoy took part in technical rehearsals on 11 and 13 May, followed by dress rehearsals on 17 and 18 May. The Polish performance featured the members of Ich Troje performing in white, gold and beige ornate costumes and joined by two backing vocalists, while Real McCoy performed off stage amongst the audience. Male vocalist of Ich Troje, Michał Wiśniewski, had green and white hair rather than his usual red due to his promotional contract with a mobile network operator. Wiśniewski concluded the performance by tearing off the dress of pregnant vocalist and his then-fiancée Anna Świątczak and displayed affection towards their unborn baby. The stage was predominately in blue and red colours with gold stars displaying on the background. The performance also featured pyrotechnic effects.

At the end of the show, Poland was not announced among the top 10 entries in the semi-final and therefore failed to qualify to compete in the final. It was later revealed that Poland placed eleventh in the semi-final, receiving a total of 70 points.

=== Voting ===
Below is a breakdown of points awarded to Poland and awarded by Poland in the semi-final and grand final of the contest. The nation awarded its 12 points to Finland in the semi-final and the final of the contest.

==== Points awarded to Poland ====
Points awarded to Poland (Semi-final)
Score	Country
12 points	
10 points	Ukraine
8 points	Lithuania
7 points	Ireland
6 points	Germany
5 points	Russia
4 points	Belarus; Moldova; Spain
3 points	Armenia; Iceland; Latvia
2 points	France; Greece; Israel; Netherlands; Norway
1 point	Belgium; Malta; United Kingdom

==== Points awarded by Poland ====
Points awarded by Poland (Semi-final)
Score	Country
12 points	Finland
10 points	Lithuania
8 points	Russia
7 points	Sweden
6 points	Ukraine
5 points	Bosnia and Herzegovina
4 points	Belgium
3 points	Armenia
2 points	Ireland
1 point	Monaco

Points awarded by Poland (Final)
Score	Country
12 points	Finland
10 points	Russia
8 points	Lithuania
7 points	Sweden
6 points	Ukraine
5 points	Armenia
4 points	Bosnia and Herzegovina
3 points	Romania
2 points	Ireland
1 point	United Kingdom
