= Netherlands in the Eurovision Song Contest 2006 =

- Eurovision Song Contest 2006
- Participating broadcaster: Nederlandse Omroep Stichting (NOS)
- Country: Netherlands
- Selection process: Nationaal Songfestival 2006
- Selection date: 12 March 2006

Competing entry
- Song: "Amambanda"
- Artist: Treble
- Songwriters: Caroline Hoffman; Niña van Dijk; Djem van Dijk

Placement
- Semi-final result: Failed to qualify (20th)

Participation chronology

The Netherlands was represented at the Eurovision Song Contest 2006 with the song "Amambanda", written by Caroline Hoffman, Niña van Dijk, and Djem van Dijk. This was performed by themselves under their stage name Treble. The Dutch participating broadcaster, Nederlandse Omroep Stichting (NOS), organised the national final Nationaal Songfestival 2006 in order to select its entry for the contest. Three artists competed in the national final on 12 March 2006, where the winner was selected over two rounds of voting. In the first round, each of the artists performed three songs, and a nine-member jury panel selected one song per act to qualify for the second round. In the second round, "Amambanda" performed by Treble was chosen as the winner exclusively through a public vote.

The Netherlands competed in the semi-final of the Eurovision Song Contest, which took place on 18 May 2006. Performing during the show in position 17, "Amambanda" was not announced among the top 10 entries of the semi-final and therefore did not qualify to compete in the final. It was later revealed that the Netherlands placed twentieth out of the 23 participating countries in the semi-final with 22 points.

== Background ==
Before the 2006 contest, Nederlandse Televisie Stichting (NTS) until 1969, and Nederlandse Omroep Stichting (NOS) since 1970, had participated in the Eurovision Song Contest representing the Netherlands forty-six times since NTS début in 1956. They have won the contest four times: in 1957 with the song "Net als toen" performed by Corry Brokken; in 1959 with the song "'n Beetje" performed by Teddy Scholten; in 1969 as one of four countries to tie for first place with "De troubadour" performed by Lenny Kuhr; and finally in 1975 with "Ding-a-dong" performed by the group Teach-In. Following the introduction of semi-finals for the 2004 contest, they had featured in only one final. Their least successful result has been last place, achieved on four occasions, most recently in 1968. They have also received nul points on two occasions; in 1962 and in 1963.

As part of its duties as a participating broadcaster, NOS organises the selection of its entry in the Eurovision Song Contest and broadcasts the event in the country. The Dutch broadcasters have used various methods to select their entry in the past, such as the Nationaal Songfestival, a live televised national final to choose the performer, song or both to compete at Eurovision. However, internal selections have also been held on occasion. Since 2003, NOS, in collaboration with Televisie Radio Omroep Stichting (TROS), has organised Nationaal Songfestival in order to select its entry for the contest, a method that was continued for its 2006 entry but without the collaboration with TROS.

== Before Eurovision ==
=== Nationaal Songfestival 2006 ===
Nationaal Songfestival 2006 was the national final developed by NOS that selected its entry for the Eurovision Song Contest 2006. Nine entries competed in the competition that consisted of a final on 12 March 2006 which took place at the Heineken Music Hall in Amsterdam, hosted by Paul de Leeuw. The show was broadcast on Nederland 2 as well as streamed online via the broadcaster's website nos.nl. The national final was watched by 1.26 million viewers in the Netherlands with a market share of 16.2%.

==== Format ====
Three artists invited by NOS competed in the national final where the winner was selected over two rounds of voting. In the first round, each artist performed three candidate Eurovision songs and a nine-member jury selected one song for each act to proceed to the superfinal. In the superfinal, the winner was selected exclusively by public televoting. Each juror awarded a point for their favourite song of each artist in the first round, while viewers were able to vote via telephone and SMS in the superfinal.

The jury panel consisted of:

- Glennis Grace – singer, represented the Netherlands in 2005
- Lange Frans – singer
- Floortje Dessing – presenter
- Ron Stoeltie – Radio 2 music director
- Fiona Heering – fashion journalist
- Henk Temming – composer
- Tasha's World – singer
- Jan Keizer – singer
- Giel Beelen – radio DJ

==== Competing entries ====
On 22 November 2005, the three selected competing artists were announced during a press conference that took place in Amsterdam. A submission period was opened on the same day where composers from or with a link to the Netherlands were able to submit their songs for the artists until 16 January 2006. 174 songs were received by the broadcaster at the closing of the deadline: 82 for Maud, 47 for Behave and 45 for Treble. Each of the artists selected three songs for the competition, two of them being self-provided and one of them from the open submissions in consultation with NOS and their record companies. The nine songs were announced on 15 February 2006.

Artist	Song	Songwriter(s)	Selection
Behave	"Heaven Knows"	Dick Kok	Open submission
Behave	"L.A. Baby"	Michiel Cremers, Gerjan Schreuder	Self-provided
Behave	"Maybe Tomorrow"	Michiel Cremers, Gerjan Schreuder	Self-provided
Maud	"I'm Alive"	Ronald Seerden, Ingrid Mank	Self-provided
Maud	"One More Try"	Joachim Vermeulen-Windsant, Maarten ten Hove	Open submission
Maud	"Without Your Love"	Tony Cornelissen, Allan Eshuys	Self-provided
Treble	"Amambanda"	Caroline Hoffman, Niña van Dijk, Djem van Dijk	Self-provided
Treble	"Lama Gaia"	Caroline Hoffman, Niña van Dijk, Djem van Dijk	Self-provided
Treble	"Make Your Choice"	Jerry van der Wolf	Open submission

==== Final ====
The final took place on 12 March 2006. In the first round, each of the three acts performed their three candidate Eurovision songs and the votes of a nine-member expert jury selected one song per artist to proceed to the superfinal. In the superfinal, the winner, "Amambanda" performed by Treble, was selected exclusively by a public televote. Approximately 126,000 votes were cast by the public in the superfinal. In addition to the performances of the competing entries, the show featured a guest performance by the Greek dance group Evropi.

Final – 12 March 2006
Artist	R/O	Song	Jury Votes									Total	Result
Artist	R/O	Song	G. Grace	L. Frans	R. Stoeltie	F. Dessing	T. World	H. Temming	F. Heering	J. Keizer	G. Beelen	Total	Result
Treble	1	"Amambanda"	X		X	X	X	X		X	X	7	Advanced
Treble	2	"Make Your Choice"										0	—N/a
Treble	3	"Lama Gaia"		X					X			2	—N/a
Behave	4	"L.A. Baby"			X							1	—N/a
Behave	5	"Maybe Tomorrow"	X						X			2	—N/a
Behave	6	"Heaven Knows"		X		X	X	X		X	X	6	Advanced
Maud	7	"One More Try"				X					(Note: Giel Beelen did not vote for any of Maud's songs as he didn't think they were good enough for Eurovision.)	1	—N/a
Maud	8	"Without Your Love"		X				X		X	(Note: Giel Beelen did not vote for any of Maud's songs as he didn't think they were good enough for Eurovision.)	3	—N/a
Maud	9	"I'm Alive"	X		X		X		X		(Note: Giel Beelen did not vote for any of Maud's songs as he didn't think they were good enough for Eurovision.)	4	Advanced

Superfinal – 12 March 2006
R/O	Artist	Song	Televote	Place
1	Treble	"Amambanda"	72%	1
2	Behave	"Heaven Knows"	15%	2
3	Maud	"I'm Alive"	13%	3

=== Promotion ===
Treble specifically promoted "Amambanda" as the Dutch Eurovision entry by taking part in a six-week promotional tour where they performed at live events, radio shows and talk shows across Europe between March and May.

== At Eurovision ==
According to Eurovision rules, all nations with the exceptions of the host country, the "Big Four" (France, Germany, Spain and the United Kingdom) and the ten highest placed finishers in the 2005 contest are required to qualify from the semi-final on 18 May 2006 in order to compete for the final on 20 May 2006; the top ten countries from the semi-final progress to the final. On 21 March 2006, a special allocation draw was held which determined the running order for the semi-final and the Netherlands was set to perform in position 17, following the entry from Finland and before the entry from Lithuania.

The semi-final and the final were broadcast in the Netherlands on Nederland 2 with commentary by Cornald Maas and Paul de Leeuw as well as via radio on Radio 2 with commentary by Ron Stoeltie. NOS appointed Paul de Leeuw as its spokesperson to announce the Dutch votes during the final.

=== Voting ===
Below is a breakdown of points awarded to the Netherlands and awarded by the Netherlands in the semi-final and grand final of the contest. The nation awarded its 12 points to Armenia in the semi-final and to Turkey in the final of the contest.

==== Points awarded to the Netherlands ====
Points awarded to the Netherlands (Semi-final)
Score	Country
12 points	
10 points	
8 points	
7 points	
6 points	
5 points	Turkey
4 points	Armenia; Belgium
3 points	Cyprus
2 points	Albania; Andorra
1 point	Iceland; Lithuania

==== Points awarded by the Netherlands ====
Points awarded by the Netherlands (Semi-final)
Score	Country
12 points	Armenia
10 points	Turkey
8 points	Bosnia and Herzegovina
7 points	Belgium
6 points	Finland
5 points	Lithuania
4 points	Sweden
3 points	Ireland
2 points	Poland
1 point	Russia

Points awarded by the Netherlands (Final)
Score	Country
12 points	Turkey
10 points	Armenia
8 points	Bosnia and Herzegovina
7 points	Finland
6 points	Lithuania
5 points	Greece
4 points	Ireland
3 points	Germany
2 points	Russia
1 point	Ukraine
