= Israel in the Eurovision Song Contest 2007 =

- Eurovision Song Contest 2007
- Participating broadcaster: Israel Broadcasting Authority (IBA)
- Country: Israel
- Selection process: Artist: Internal selection Song: Kdam Eurovision 2007
- Selection date: Artist: 7 January 2007; Song: 27 February 2007

Competing entry
- Song: "Push the Button"
- Artist: Teapacks
- Songwriters: Kobi Oz

Placement
- Semi-final result: Failed to qualify (24th)

Participation chronology

Israel was represented at the Eurovision Song Contest 2007 with the song "Push the Button", written by Kobi Oz, and performed by the band Teapacks. The Israeli participating broadcaster, the Israel Broadcasting Authority (IBA), selected its entry through the national final Kdam Eurovision 2007, after having previously selected the performers internally in January 2007. The national final took place on 27 February 2007 and featured four songs. "Push the Button" emerged as the winning song after achieving the highest score following the combination of votes from an eleven-member jury panel, an online vote and a public vote.

Israel competed in the semi-final of the Eurovision Song Contest which took place on 10 May 2007. Performing during the show in position 2, "Push the Button" was not announced among the top 10 entries of the semi-final and therefore did not qualify to compete in the final. It was later revealed that Israel placed twenty-fourth out of the 28 participating countries in the semi-final with 17 points.

== Background ==
Prior to the 2007 Contest, the Israel Broadcasting Authority (IBA) had participated in the Eurovision Song Contest representing Israel twenty-nine times since its first entry in 1973. It has won the contest on three occasions: in 1978 with the song "A-Ba-Ni-Bi" by Izhar Cohen and the Alphabeta, in 1979 with the song "Hallelujah" by Milk and Honey, and in 1998 with the song "Diva" by Dana International. Since the introduction of semi-finals to the format of the Eurovision Song Contest in 2004, Israel has, to this point, managed to qualify to the final two times, including a top ten result in 2005 with "HaSheket SheNish'ar" by Shiri Maimon placing fourth. It had qualified to the final for two consecutive years in 2005 and 2006, which included their 2006 entry "Together We Are One" performed by Eddie Butler.

As part of its duties as participating broadcaster, IBA organises the selection of its entry in the Eurovision Song Contest and broadcasts the event in the country. IBA confirmed its participation in the 2007 contest on 10 October 2006. To select its entry for 2007, it conducted an internal selection to select the artist that would represent Israel and a national final to select the song for the artist.

== Before Eurovision ==
=== Artist selection ===
On 7 January 2007, IBA announced that the band Teapacks was selected as the Israeli representatives for the Eurovision Song Contest 2007. A special committee consisting of music industry professionals and members from IBA considered several artists, of which Liel (who represented Switzerland in 2006 as part of six4one), and Michel Guriashvili were highly considered before Teapacks was ultimately selected. The members of the committee were Yoav Ginai (entertainment director of IBA), Yaakov Naveh (IBA artists representative), Dalia Cohen (musician and composer), Amnon Shiloni (director of Reshet Gimmel), Noam Gil-Or (editor and presenter at Reshet Gimmel), Bracha Rosenfeld (producer), Kobi Oshrat (composer), Yardena Arazi (who represented Israel in 1976, as part of Shokolad, Menta, Mastik, and in 1988), Haïm Ulliel (singer), Anastassia Michaeli (television presenter), Dafna Dekel (who represented Israel in 1992) and Itzik Yehoshua (music editor at 88FM). It was also announced that a national final titled Kdam Eurovision 2007 featuring four songs would take place to select their song.

=== Kdam Eurovision 2007 ===
Four songs, all written by band member Kobi Oz, were provided by Teapacks for the competition. Prior to the final, the songs were presented on 22 February 2007 during a special presentation programme broadcast via radio on Reshet Gimmel, Reshet Bet and 88FM.

==== Final ====
The final took place on 27 February 2007 at the Auditorium in Dorot, hosted by Natali Atiya and Noa Barak and broadcast on Channel 1 as well as online via IBA's official Eurovision Song Contest website Eurovil. All four competing songs were performed by Teapacks and the winning song, "Push the Button", was selected by a combination of the votes from four voting groups: an expert jury of IBA representatives (40%), online voting conducted through Eurovil (20%), public voting conducted through telephone (20%) and public voting conducted through SMS (20%). In addition to the performances of the competing songs, Haïm Ulliel, the band Knesiyat Hasekhel and The Aluminum Show performed as the interval acts.

Final – 27 February 2007
R/O	Song	Jury		Internet		Televote		SMS		Total	Place
R/O	Song	Votes	Points	Percentage	Points	Percentage	Points	Percentage	Points	Total	Place
1	"Push the Button"	10	40	57%	20	57%	20	64%	20	100	1
2	"Salam Salami" (סלאם סלאמי)	0	0	15%	0	13%	0	16%	0	0	2
3	"Twelve Points"	0	0	16%	0	10%	0	7%	0	0	2
4	"Voulez-vous"	1	0	12%	0	20%	0	13%	0	0	2

== At Eurovision ==
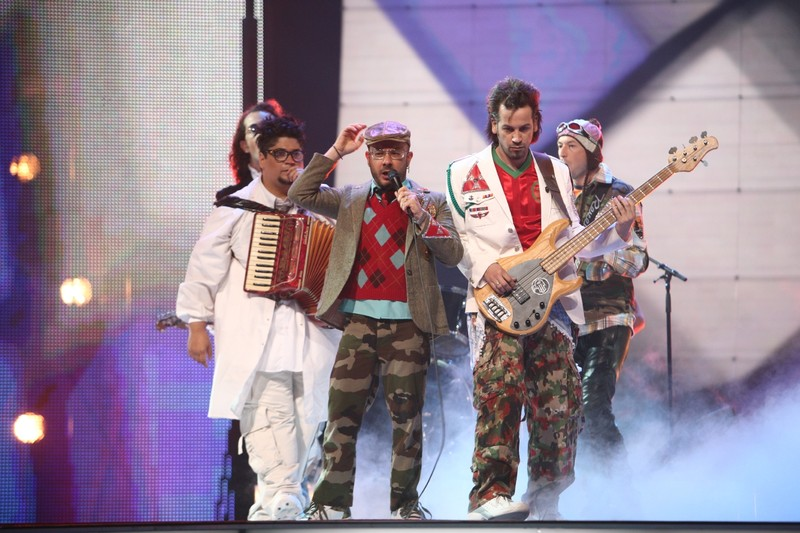
Teapacks during a rehearsal before the semi-final

According to Eurovision rules, all nations with the exceptions of the host country, the "Big Four" (France, Germany, Spain and the United Kingdom) and the ten highest placed finishers in the 2006 contest are required to qualify from the semi-final in order to compete for the final; the top ten countries from each semi-final progress to the final. On 12 March 2007, a special allocation draw was held which determined the running order for the semi-final. During the allocation draw, it was determined that Israel would perform in position 2, following the entry from Bulgaria and before the entry from Cyprus. At the end of the semi-final, Israel was not announced among the top 10 entries in the semi-final and therefore failed to qualify to compete in the final. It was later revealed that Israel placed twenty-fourth in the semi-final, receiving a total of 17 points.

=== Voting ===
Below is a breakdown of points awarded to Israel and awarded by Israel in the semi-final and grand final of the contest. The nation awarded its 12 points to Belarus in the semi-final and the final of the contest.

==== Points awarded to Israel ====
Points awarded to Israel (Semi-final)
Score	Country
12 points	
10 points	
8 points	
7 points	
6 points	France
5 points	
4 points	Lithuania
3 points	Estonia
2 points	Czech Republic
1 point	Iceland; Russia

==== Points awarded by Israel ====
Points awarded by Israel (Semi-final)
Score	Country
12 points	Belarus
10 points	Latvia
8 points	Georgia
7 points	Serbia
6 points	Bulgaria
5 points	Denmark
4 points	Cyprus
3 points	Moldova
2 points	Andorra
1 point	Netherlands

Points awarded by Israel (Final)
Score	Country
12 points	Belarus
10 points	Ukraine
8 points	Russia
7 points	Romania
6 points	Georgia
5 points	Armenia
4 points	Moldova
3 points	Serbia
2 points	Spain
1 point	Greece
