= List of stage names: O =

This list of stage names lists names used by those in the entertainment industry, alphabetically by their stage name's surname (or the best approximation) followed by the given name (or the best approximation) where the surname begins with "O". One-word stage names are presented in List of one-word stage names.

Stage name	Birth name	Life	Notability	Notes
Jimmy O	Jean Jimmy Alexandre	1974–2010	Haitian musician and singer-songwriter	
Karen O	Karen Orzolek	1978–	South Korean-American singer, musician and songwriter (Yeah Yeah Yeahs)	
Hugh O'Brian	Hugh Krampe	1925–2016	American actor	
Jim O'Brien	James Oldham	1939–1983	American newscaster	
Richard O'Callaghan	Richard Brooke	1940–	English character actor	
Una O'Connor	Agnes Teresa McGlade	1880–1959	Irish-American actress	
Anita O'Day	Anita Belle Colton	1919–2006	American jazz singer	
Molly O'Day	Suzanne Noonan	1909–1998	American actress	
Molly O'Day	Lois LaVerne Williamson	1923–1987	American country singer	Also known as Dixie Lee and Mountain Fern
Kenny O'Dell	Kenneth Guy Gist Jr.	1944–2018	American country singer and songwriter	
Tony O'Dell	Anthony Dell'Aquila	1960–	American actor	
Cathy O'Donnell	Ann Steely	1923–1970	American actress	
Lani O'Grady	Lanita Rose Agrati	1954–2001	American actress	
George O'Hara	George Bolger	1899–1966	American actor and screenwriter	
Maureen O'Hara	Maureen FitzSimons	1920–2015	Irish-American actress and singer	
Quinn O'Hara	Alice Jones	1941–2017	Scottish-American actress	
Nana Okada	Hiroko Yai	1959–	Japanese singer and actress	
Dennis O'Keefe	Edward Vance Flanagan	1908–1968	American actor and screenwriter	
Michael O'Keefe	Raymond Peter O'Keefe Jr.	1955–	American actor	
Tim O'Kelly	Timothy Patrick Wright	1941–1990	American actor	
Kate O'Mara	Frances Meredith Carroll	1939–2014	English actress	
Colette O'Neil	Mary Irene Colette McCrossan	1935–2021	Scottish actress	
Nance O'Neil	Gertrude Lamson	1874–1965	American actress	
Paddie O'Neil	Adalena Nail	1926–2010	English actress and singer	
Sally O'Neil	Virginia Noonan	1908–1968	American actress	
Maire O'Neill	Mary Agnes Allgood	1886–1952	Irish actress	
Tara Lynne O'Neill	Lynne James	1975–	Irish actress	
Terry O'Quinn	Terrance Quinn	1952–	American actor	
Jack Oakie	Lewis Delaney Offield	1903–1978	American actor	
Dagmar Oakland	Edna Martine Dagmar Andersen	1897–1989	American actress	
Vivien Oakland	Vivian Ruth Andersen	1895–1958	American actress	
Annie Oakley	Phoebe Ann Mosey	1869–1926	American sharpshooter	
Merle Oberon	Estelle Merle O'Brien Thompson	1911–1979	British actress	
Ric Ocasek	Richard Theodore Otcasek	1944–2019	American musician, singer, songwriter and record producer	
Billy Ocean	Leslie Sebastian Charles	1950–	Trinidadian-British musician	
Danny Ocean	Daniel Alejandro Morales Reyes	1992–	Venezuelan singer, songwriter and record producer	
Frank Ocean	Christopher Edwin Breaux	1987–	American singer, songwriter and rapper	
Nivek Ogre	Kevin Graham Ogilvie	1962–	Canadian musician (Skinny Puppy)	
Isabel Oli	Maria Olivia Daytia	1981–	Filipino actress and model	
Edna May Oliver	Edna May Nutter	1883–1942	American actress	
Don Omar	William Omar Landrón Rivera	1978–	Puerto Rican rapper, singer, songwriter, record producer and actor	
Nelly Omar	Nilda Elvira Vattuone Pesoa	1911–2013	Argentine actress and singer	
Anny Ondra	Anna Ondráková	1903–1987	Czech actress	
Moka Only	Daniel Jones Denton	1973–	Canadian musician, rapper and producer	
Cazzi Opeia	Moa Anna Maria Carlebecker	1988–	Swedish DJ, singer and songwriter	
Max Ophüls	Maximillian Oppenheimer	1902–1957	German-French film director	
Risto Orko	Risto Nylund	1899–2001	Finnish film producer and director	
Eugene Ormandy	Jenő Blau	1899–1985	Hungarian-American conductor and musician	
Benjamin Orr	Benjamin Orzechowski	1947–2000	American musician (The Cars)	
Vivienne Osborne	Vera Vivienne Spragg	1896–1961	American actress	
Henry Oscar	Henry Wale	1891–1969	English actor	
Charles Osgood	Charles Osgood Wood III	1933–2024	American radio and television commentator	
Lee Oskar	Lee Oskar Levitin	1948–	Danish musician (War)	
Johnny Otis	Ioannis Alexandres Veliotes	1921–2012	American singer, musician, composer, bandleader and record producer	
Shuggie Otis	Johnny Veliotes Jr.	1953–	American singer-songwriter and musician	
Natalino Otto	Natale Codognotto	1912–1969	Italian singer	
DJ Ötzi	Gerhard Friedle	1971–	Austrian music producer and singer	
Beverley Owen	Beverley Ogg	1937–2019	American actress	
Bill Owen	William John Owen Rowbotham	1914–1999	English actor and songwriter	
Gary Owens	Gary Bernard Altman	1934–2015	American disc jockey, voice actor and radio personality	
Monty Oxymoron	Laurence Burrow	1961–	English musician (The Damned)	
Frank Oz	Frank Oznowicz	1944–	English-American actor, puppeteer and director	
Kobi Oz	Yaakov Uzan	1969–	Israeli singer (Teapacks)	
