= Push the Button (Teapacks song) =

2007 single by Teapacks

Single by Teapacks
- Language: English; French; Hebrew
- Released: 27 February 2007
- Genre: Pop
- Length: 2:58
- Songwriter: Kobi Oz

Teapacks singles chronology
"Ha'etzev Avar Lagur Kan (Sadness Came to Live Here)" (1998)	"Push the Button" (2007)

Music video
- "Push the Button" on YouTube

Lyric video
- "Push the Button" on YouTube

Eurovision Song Contest 2007 entry
- Country: Israel
- Artists: Kobi Oz; Meir Amar; Motti Yoseff; Rami Yosifov; Gal Peremen; Dani Aberjel
- As: Teapacks
- Composer: Kobi Oz
- Lyricist: Kobi Oz

Finals performance
- Semi-final result: 24th
- Semi-final points: 17

Entry chronology
- ◄ "Together We Are One" (2006)
- "The Fire in Your Eyes" (2008) ►

Official performance video
- "Push the Button" (Semi-Final) on YouTube

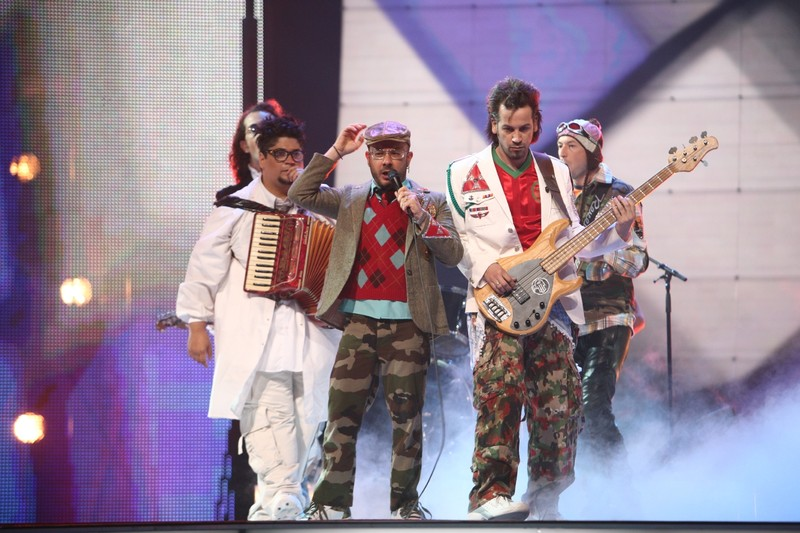
Teapacks performing at the Eurovision Song Contest

"Push the Button", known in Hebrew as "Kaftor Adom" (כפתור אדום, "Red Button"), was the Israeli entry in the Eurovision Song Contest 2007, performed in English, French and Hebrew by Teapacks. This song was the first Israeli entry to feature lyrics in French, as well as the first to feature lyrics in any language aside from Hebrew or English. The entry gained the right to represent the country by an absolute majority, winning 20% of the televote, 20% of the SMS vote, 20% of the pre-vote and 40% of the jury vote. Teapacks had been selected as the Israeli representative by the Israel Broadcasting Authority and invited to perform four songs at the national final to determine which one would be performed in Helsinki.The song came in 24th place in the semi-final out of 28 participants and did not qualify for the grand final.

== Style and lyrics ==
The song is an up-tempo number, featuring many changes in tempo and style. Lead singer Kobi Oz begins by singing in English over a steady accordion beat, explaining that "the world is full of terror" and singing about the risk posed by "some crazy rulers" who are bent on destruction. At this point, the song moves to the chorus, featuring a guitar riff and the repeated phrase "they're gonna push the button".

The second verse begins in a similar style to the first, with the exception that the lyrics are delivered in French. Oz sings that there is "too much violence" due to the fanatics he described earlier. The accordion beat is then replaced once again as Oz switches back to English to sing that he does not want to die and "I wanna see the flowers bloom / don't wanna go kaput kaboom" in a more dramatic manner. The chorus (complete with guitar riff) is then repeated (with "he's gonna..." instead of "they're gonna...").

Following the chorus, the song changes tempo entirely, as Oz begins to rap in Hebrew. He expands on his earlier description of the risk of fanaticism, describing a nightmarish situation in which nobody else seems aware of, or concerned about, what is happening. The tempo then switches back to the steady beat of the earlier verses, but with Oz still singing in Hebrew describing the people in his situation as "pawns". He switches further to his dramatic vocals, wondering if perhaps the song is altogether "too sharp", and suggesting that "We should sing palm tree songs, desert songs with no flags", referring to an older, romantic (and apolitical) style of Israeli song. The next line – "ani od khay, khay, khay" ("I'm still alive, alive, alive") – is a direct quote of the hook from Israel's upbeat (and apolitical) second-place-winning 1983 Eurovision entry, "Khay". But this quote, exuberant and triumphant in "Khay", here is (perhaps slyly) repurposed as just part of the nervous narrator's thought – "I'm still alive, alive, alive" it begins, then concludes (no longer apolitical), "and if the situation remains as frightening as it has been, only then I will say / I'm gonna push the button" (i.e. "I'm gonna push the button" in the final chorus, a response to "they're gonna push the button" in the first chorus and "he's gonna push the button" in the second chorus).

The politically charged lyrical content caused some controversy. While the message of the song is unclear, some suggest that the song is a reflection of the anxiety of some Israelis about the threat of nuclear war with Iran. This interpretation assumes that the lyrics "He's gonna push the button" refer to the Iranian president Mahmoud Ahmadinejad. Despite earlier statements that it had an inappropriate message and might be banned from the 2007 contest, Eurovision Song Contest organizers approved the Israeli entry. The song (and the controversy) was reported in BBC News due to its content.

As Israel had not finished the previous contest in the top 10, the song had to compete in the semi-final. Here, it was performed second, following Bulgaria's Elitsa Todorova and Stoyan Yankoulov with "Water" and preceding Cyprus' Evridiki with "Comme ci, comme ça". At the close of voting, it had received 17 points, placing 24th in a field of 28 and thus missing out on qualification for the final and requiring Israel to qualify through the semi-final at the next Contest.

== Commercial releases ==
There are three commercial releases of the song in Israel with various B-sides. The first is a promotional CD called Kdam Erovizyon 2007 with the B-sides "Salaam Salami", "12 Points", "Voulez Vous" and "Yoshvim bebeit kafe" (the title track from their 2001 album), distributed to Eurovision selectors. The second was also a promotional release, with the B-sides "Money Trees Forever" (an English version of the track "Hora nadlanim" from the group's then-recent album Radio/Musika/Ivrit) and "Croque Madame Croque Monsieur", the latter of which would resurface nearly two decades later on the band's 2024 album Shawarma Beach. The third was a commercial CD single with the instrumental and vocal tracks as separate B-sides.

During Kobi Oz' solo career and after Teapacks' reunion, the song's arrangement was changed: it was played in C instead of A and the Hebrew-language rap was instead read out as a spoken word piece before the beginning of the song.
