= Israel in the Eurovision Song Contest =

- Eurovision Song Contest
- Participating broadcaster: Israeli Public Broadcasting Corporation (IPBC/Kan; 2018–) Formerly: Israel Broadcasting Authority (IBA; 1973–2017)

Participation summary
- Appearances: 48 (41 finals)
- First appearance: 1973
- Highest placement: 1st: 1978, 1979, 1998, 2018
- Host: 1979, 1999, 2019
- Participation history: 1973; 1974; 1975; 1976; 1977; 1978; 1979; 1980; 1981; 1982; 1983; 1984; 1985; 1986; 1987; 1988; 1989; 1990; 1991; 1992; 1993; 1994; 1995; ~~1996~~; 1997; 1998; 1999; 2000; 2001; 2002; 2003; 2004; 2005; 2006; 2007; 2008; 2009; 2010; 2011; 2012; 2013; 2014; 2015; 2016; 2017; 2018; 2019; ~~2020~~; 2021; 2022; 2023; 2024; 2025; 2026

Related articles
- Israel Song Festival; HaKokhav HaBa; The X Factor Israel
- Israel's page at Eurovision.com
- For the most recent participation see Israel in the Eurovision Song Contest 2026

Israel has been represented at the Eurovision Song Contest 48 times since its debut in 1973. The current Israeli participating broadcaster in the contest is the Israeli Public Broadcasting Corporation (IPBC/Kan). Israel has won the contest four times, and has hosted it in Jerusalem in 1979 and 1999, and in Tel Aviv in 2019.

Israel's first appearance in the contest in 1973 was successful, with "Ey Sham" performed by Ilanit finishing fourth. Israel then achieved victories in 1978 and 1979, with "A-Ba-Ni-Bi" by Izhar Cohen and the Alphabeta, and "Hallelujah" by Milk and Honey. In 1980, the Israeli broadcaster declined to host the contest for a second consecutive year due to financial reasons. Because the contest date in the Hague conflicted with Yom HaZikaron, Israel did not participate. This remains the only instance of a winning country not competing the following year. The country's best results in the 1980s were second-place finishes for "Hora" by Avi Toledano in 1982 and "Chai" by Ofra Haza in 1983. Israel achieved its third victory in 1998, with "Diva" by Dana International. To date, Israel holds the record for the most participations and the most wins in the contest without finishing last, but it has placed second-to-last in the final thrice—1986, 1993, and 2006—and received no points from the juries in 2019.

Since the introduction of the semi-finals in 2004, Israel has failed to reach the final seven times. In 2005, "HaSheket SheNish'ar" by Shiri Maimon gave the country its tenth top-five result, finishing fourth. After failing to qualify for the final for four consecutive years (2011–14), Israel reached the final in 2015 with "Golden Boy" by Nadav Guedj finishing ninth, and the country has participated in the final every year since with the exception of 2022, while also recording a fourth win in 2018 with "Toy" by Netta.

Israel's participation in the contest has been subject to numerous controversies, mostly due to the Israeli–Palestinian conflict and the wider Arab–Israeli conflict. Tensions around the country's presence have significantly escalated since the Gaza war which began in October 2023.

== History ==
The Israel Broadcasting Authority (IBA) was a member of the European Broadcasting Union (EBU), making it eligible to participate in the Eurovision Song Contest. It had participated in the contest, representing Israel, since the 18th edition in 1973. In 2017, the IBA was succeeded by the Israeli Public Broadcasting Corporation (IPBC/Kan), which has been responsible for Israel's participation in the contest since the following year.

To date, there have been four Israeli victories in the contest. Izhar Cohen and the Alphabeta won in Paris in 1978 with "A-Ba-Ni-Bi". On home ground in Jerusalem the following year, Israel won again, this time with "Hallelujah" performed by Milk and Honey. Unusually, Israel did not defend the title in 1980 (see below). The third victory came almost 20 years later in Birmingham in 1998, when Dana International took top honours with the song "Diva". It took a 20-year wait for Israel to record its fourth victory at the 2018 contest in Lisbon, with the song "Toy" by Netta, earning Israel its highest-ever score of 529 points.

Israel's earliest selections were picked by the IBA. The first singer to represent the country was Ilanit, who finished 4th in 1973. In 1972, while Ilanit was in Germany recording as part of the duo Ilan and Ilanit with her partner Shlomo Tzach, the duo received an offer to represent Germany in that year's contest. Since Israel was eligible to participate, they approached the IBA with a proposal that Ilanit would represent Israel. However, the registration period was over by then and Ilanit was told she could represent Israel in 1973. After she was sent again four years later, it was decided that henceforth the winner of the Hebrew Song Festival would represent Israel. The 1978 and 1979 Israeli Eurovision winners were selected by this method. From 1981, the selection process took place via the Kdam Eurovision with the exception of 1990, 1998, 1999, 2000 and 2002, when the IBA selected its representatives internally.

After winning the contest in 1978 and 1979, the IBA was financially and logistically unable to organise the event for a second consecutive year. The Netherlands agreed to host the 1980 contest in Israel's place. The date chosen for that year's contest coincided with Yom HaZikaron, Israeli Memorial Day, so Israel could not compete. This made Israel the only country to date unable to defend its title. The 1980 winning song "Pizmon Chozer" by The Brothers & the Sisters never had an opportunity to compete.

In 1984, Israel again refrained from participating due to the same date conflict. It was rumoured that Ilanit and the song "Balalaika" would have been its representative that year, but this was denied by Shlomo Zach, the producer of the song.

Israel's entries have had a mixed reception. Avi Toledano (1982) and Ofra Haza (1983) scored well with big revivalist numbers, but the all-singing, all-dancing style became less popular later in the decade and Israel's 1986 entry, "Yavo Yom" by Moti Giladi and Sarai Tzuriel, came in 19th.

In 1987, Israel finished 8th with "Shir Habatlanim" by the satiric duo Lazy Bums. Then-Israeli Minister of Culture, Yitzhak Navon, said he would resign if the song went on to represent Israel at the contest; this ultimately did not occur.

In 1990, Rita's "Shara Barkhovot" was not well received, but in 1991, Orna and Moshe Datz finished third, Israel's best result since 1983. Israel also had a 5th-place finish by Eden when it hosted the 1999 contest. Ping-Pong's disco effort in 2000 failed, though the group was noted for their optimistic lyrics and message of reconciliation and peace. They waved Syrian flags at the end of their performance, angering some Israelis.

In 2004, David D'Or came 11th in the semi-final with "Leha'amin", leaving Israel out of the final for the first time since 1997. Shiri Maimon with "HaSheket SheNish'ar" in 2005 brought Israel back to the top five, and ensured Israel a place in the 2006 final, where it was represented by singer Eddie Butler, who had finished 5th as part of Eden in 1999; however, his performance of the song "Together We Are One" finished 23rd, with only four points.

IBA's Eurovision committee chose Teapacks to represent Israel in 2007. Their humorous entry "Push the Button" finished 24th out of 28 in the semi-final and did not advance to the final. As a result, Israel had to compete in the 2008 semi-final, from which it advanzed to the final, where Boaz and "The Fire in Your Eyes" finished ninth. In 2009, for the first time, an Arab citizen of Israel represented the country: Mira Awad performed "There Must Be Another Way" alongside Jewish-Israeli singer Noa in Moscow. Israel was represented in 2010 by Harel Skaat, who came 14th in the final with "Milim".

Israel's participations from 2011 to 2014 were less successful, as former Eurovision winner Dana International in Düsseldorf, the band Izabo in Baku, Moran Mazor in Malmö, and Mei Finegold in Copenhagen all failed to qualify for the final. The 2014 non-qualification led to Kdam Eurovision being discontinued, and the IBA later partnered with Keshet to use the existing reality singing competition HaKokhav HaBa to select the Israeli artist—a method that has mostly continued since—though the song selection has gone through various formats. In 2015, Nadav Guedj brought Israel back to the final with "Golden Boy", the first Israeli entry without a Hebrew lyric. Before Netta's win, Israel also managed to qualify in 2016 with Hovi Star and "Made of Stars", which finished 14th, and in 2017 with Imri Ziv and "I Feel Alive", which finished 23rd. In 2019, as hosts with Kobi Marimi and his song "Home", Israel was pre-qualified for the final and finished 23rd, making it the fourth time since 2015 that the host country ranked in the bottom five.

In 2020, Eden Alene was chosen to represent the country with "Feker Libi". After the 2020 contest was cancelled, she was retained as the Israeli representative for 2021, this time with "Set Me Free", which finished 17th in the final. The song features a B6 whistle note, the highest note in the contest's history. Michael Ben David, selected through The X Factor Israel, represented Israel in 2022 with "I.M," but failed to qualify for the final. Internally-selected Noa Kirel finished third in 2023 with "Unicorn", Eden Golan placed fifth in 2024 with "Hurricane", and Yuval Raphael and Noam Bettan both finished second with "New Day Will Rise" in 2025 and "Michelle" in 2026, respectively.

== Participation overview ==
Table key
1	First place
2	Second place
3	Third place
◇	Entry selected but did not compete
†	Upcoming event

Year	Artist	Song	Language	Final	Points	Semi	Points
1973	Ilanit	"Ey Sham" (אי שם)	Hebrew	4	97	No semi-finals	
1974	Poogy	"Natati La Khaiai" (נתתי לה חיי)	Hebrew	7	11	No semi-finals	
1975	Shlomo Artzi	"At Ve'Ani" (את ואני)	Hebrew	11	40	No semi-finals	
1976	Chocolate, Menta, Mastik	"Emor Shalom" (אמור שלום)	Hebrew	6	77	No semi-finals	
1977	Ilanit	"Ahava Hi Shir Lishnayim" (אהבה היא שיר לשניים)	Hebrew	11	49	No semi-finals	
1978	Izhar Cohen and the Alphabeta	"A-Ba-Ni-Bi" (א-ב-ני-בי)	Hebrew	1	157	No semi-finals	
1979	Milk and Honey	"Hallelujah" (הללויה)	Hebrew	1	125	No semi-finals	
1981	Habibi	"Halayla" (הלילה)	Hebrew	7	56	No semi-finals	
1982	Avi Toledano	"Hora" (הורה)	Hebrew	2	100	No semi-finals	
1983	Ofra Haza	"Chai" (חי)	Hebrew	2	136	No semi-finals	
1985	Izhar Cohen	"Olé, Olé" (עולה, עולה)	Hebrew	5	93	No semi-finals	
1986	Moti Giladi and Sarai Tzuriel	"Yavo Yom" (יבוא יום)	Hebrew	19	7	No semi-finals	
1987	Datner and Kushnir	"Shir Habatlanim" (שיר הבטלנים)	Hebrew	8	73	No semi-finals	
1988	Yardena Arazi	"Ben Adam" (בן אדם)	Hebrew	7	85	No semi-finals	
1989	Gili and Galit	"Derekh Hamelekh" (דרך המלך)	Hebrew	12	50	No semi-finals	
1990	Rita	"Shara Barkhovot" (שרה ברחובות)	Hebrew	18	16	No semi-finals	
1991	Duo Datz	"Kan" (כאן)	Hebrew	3	139	No semi-finals	
1992	Dafna	"Ze Rak Sport" (זה רק ספורט)	Hebrew	6	85	No semi-finals	
1993	Lehakat Shiru	"Shiru" (שירו)	Hebrew, English	24	4	Kvalifikacija za Millstreet	
1995	Liora	"Amen" (אמן)	Hebrew	8	81	No semi-finals	
1996	Galit Bell ◇	"Shalom Olam" (שלום עולם) ◇	Hebrew ◇	Failed to qualify (Note: In order to reduce the number of participating countries at the 1996 event a qualifying round was held among all countries except the hosts. Israel failed to progress from this round; entries which failed to progress have subsequently been discounted by the EBU and do not feature as part of the countries' list of appearances.)		28	12
1998	Dana International	"Diva" (דיווה)	Hebrew	1	172	No semi-finals	
1999	Eden	"Happy Birthday"	Hebrew, English	5	93	No semi-finals	
2000	PingPong	"Sameach" (שמח)	Hebrew	22	7	No semi-finals	
2001	Tal Sondak	"Ein Davar" (אין דבר)	Hebrew	16	25	No semi-finals	
2002	Sarit Hadad	"Light a Candle"	Hebrew, English	12	37	No semi-finals	
2003	Lior Narkis	"Words for Love"	Hebrew	19	17	No semi-finals	
2004	David D'Or	"Leha'amin" (להאמין)	Hebrew, English	Failed to qualify		11	57
2005	Shiri Maimon	"HaSheket SheNish'ar" (השקט שנשאר)	English, Hebrew	4	154	7	158
2006	Eddie Butler	"Together We Are One"	English, Hebrew	23	4	Top 11 in 2005 final (Note: According to the then-Eurovision rules, the top ten non-Big Four countries from the previous year along with the Big Four automatically qualified for the Grand Final without having to compete in semi-finals. For example, if Germany and France placed inside the top ten, the 11th and 12th spots were advanced to next year's Grand Final along with all countries ranked in the top ten.)	
2007	Teapacks	"Push the Button"	English, French, Hebrew	Failed to qualify		24	17
2008	Boaz	"The Fire in Your Eyes"	Hebrew, English	9	124	5	104
2009	Noa and Mira Awad	"There Must Be Another Way"	English, Hebrew, Arabic	16	53	7	75
2010	Harel Skaat	"Milim" (מילים)	Hebrew	14	71	8	71
2011	Dana International	"Ding Dong"	Hebrew, English	Failed to qualify		15	38
2012	Izabo	"Time"	English, Hebrew	Failed to qualify		13	33
2013	Moran Mazor	"Rak Bishvilo" (רק בשבילו)	Hebrew	Failed to qualify		14	40
2014	Mei Finegold	"Same Heart"	English, Hebrew	Failed to qualify		14	19
2015	Nadav Guedj	"Golden Boy"	English	9	97	3	151
2016	Hovi Star	"Made of Stars"	English	14	135	7	147
2017	Imri	"I Feel Alive"	English	23	39	3	207
2018	Netta	"Toy"	English, Hebrew	1	529	1	283
2019	Kobi Marimi	"Home"	English	23	35	Host country	
2020	Eden Alene ◇	"Feker Libi" (ፍቅር ልቤ) ◇	English, Hebrew, Arabic, Amharic ◇	Contest cancelled (Note: The 2020 contest was cancelled due to the COVID-19 pandemic.)			
2021	Eden Alene	"Set Me Free"	English, Hebrew	17	93	5	192
2022	Michael Ben David	"I.M"	English	Failed to qualify		13	61
2023	Noa Kirel	"Unicorn"	English, Hebrew	3	362	3	127
2024	Eden Golan	"Hurricane"	English, Hebrew	5	375	1	194
2025	Yuval Raphael	"New Day Will Rise"	English, French, Hebrew	2	357	1	203
2026	Noam Bettan	"Michelle"	French, Hebrew, English	2	343	1	269
2027	Confirmed intention to participate †						

=== Congratulations: 50 Years of the Eurovision Song Contest ===
Artist	Song	Language	At Congratulations				At Eurovision		
Artist	Song	Language	Final	Points	Semi	Points	Year	Place	Points
Dana International	"Diva" (דיווה)	Hebrew	Failed to qualify		13	39	1998	1	172

== Songs by language ==
1. Hebrew (64.4%)
2. English (32.6%)
3. French (1.83%)
4. Arabic (0.72%)
5. Amharic (0.33%)

Songs	Language	Years
45	Hebrew	1973, 1974, 1975, 1976, 1977, 1978, 1979, 1981, 1982, 1983, 1985, 1986, 1987, 1988, 1989, 1990, 1991, 1992, 1993, 1995, ~~1996~~, 1998, 1999, 2000, 2001, 2002, 2003, 2004, 2005, 2006, 2007, 2008, 2009, 2010, 2011, 2012, 2013, 2014, 2018, ~~2020~~, 2021, 2023, 2024, 2025, 2026
25	English	1993, 1999, 2002, 2003, 2004, 2005, 2006, 2007, 2008, 2009, 2011, 2012, 2014, 2015, 2016, 2017, 2018, 2019, ~~2020~~, 2021, 2022, 2023, 2024, 2025, 2026
3	French	2007, 2025, 2026
2	Arabic	2009, ~~2020~~
1	Amharic	~~2020~~

== Hosting ==
Year	Location	Venue	Presenters	Photo
1979	Jerusalem	International Convention Center	Yardena Arazi and Daniel Pe'er	
1999	Jerusalem	International Convention Center	Dafna Dekel, Sigal Shachmon and Yigal Ravid	
2019	Tel Aviv	Expo Tel Aviv	Erez Tal, Bar Refaeli, Assi Azar and Lucy Ayoub	

== Awards ==
=== Marcel Bezençon Awards ===
Year	Category	Song	Composer(s) lyrics (l) / Music (m)	Performer	Final	Points	Host city	Ref.
2010	Press Award	"Milim" (מילים)	Tomer Hadadi (m) and Noam Horev (l)	Harel Skaat	14	71	(Norway) Oslo	
2010	Artistic Award (Note: Voted by commentators.)	"Milim" (מילים)	Tomer Hadadi (m) and Noam Horev (l)	Harel Skaat	14	71	(Norway) Oslo	
2010	Composer Award	"Milim" (מילים)	Tomer Hadadi (m) and Noam Horev (l)	Harel Skaat	14	71	(Norway) Oslo	

=== Winner by OGAE members ===
Year	Song	Performer	Final result	Points	Host city	Ref.
2018	"Toy"	Netta	1	529	(Portugal) Lisbon	

== Related involvement ==
=== Conductors ===
Year	Conductor (Note: All conductors are of Israeli nationality unless otherwise noted.)	Musical director	Notes	Ref.
1973	Nurit Hirsh	N/A		
1974	Yoni Rechter	N/A		
1975	Eldad Shrim	N/A		
1976	Matti Caspi	N/A		
1977	Eldad Shrim	N/A		
1978	Nurit Hirsh	Izhak Graziani	(Note: Conducted by Izhak Graziani at the national final.)	
1979	Kobi Oshrat	Izhak Graziani	(Note: Graziani also conducted the interval music.)	
1981	Eldad Shrim	N/A		
1982	Nansi Silviu Brandes	N/A	(Note: Went by "Silviu Nansi Brandes" at the contest.)	
1983	Nansi Silviu Brandes	N/A	(Note: Went by "Silviu Nansi Brandes" at the contest.)	
1985	Kobi Oshrat	N/A		
1986	Yoram Zadok	N/A		
1987	Kobi Oshrat	N/A		
1988	Eldad Shrim	N/A		
1989	Shaike Paikov	N/A		
1990	Rami Levin	N/A		
1991	Kobi Oshrat	N/A		
1992	Kobi Oshrat	N/A		
1993	Amir Frohlich	N/A		
1995	Gadi Goldman	N/A		
1998	No conductor	N/A		

=== Heads of delegation ===
Year	Head of delegation	Ref.
2002–2006	Izchak Sonnenschein	
2007–2016	Yoav Ginai	
2018	Tal Barnea	
2019–2020	Tali Katz	
2021–2023	Yuval Fischer	
2024–2025	Yoav Tzafir	
2026	Sharon Drix	

=== Commentators and spokespersons ===
Until 2018, Israel only had a television commentator once, in 1979. In most cases, the IBA opted instead to simply broadcast the transmission without commentary and with Hebrew subtitles. Between 2013 and 2017, it also aired the contest with Arabic subtitles on Channel 33. In both 1984 and 1997, which Israel also had to miss due to the holiday, the IBA aired the show on delay, and there was no radio broadcast. It also typically provided radio commentary beginning in the early 1980s, unless the country was not participating that year (with the exception of 2000). The IBA did not provide commentary until 2013, when it resumed radio broadcasting. In 2018, the IBA's successor, Kan, employed television commentators for the contest, which was a first for the country since 1979. Kan provided Arabic commentary for the final in 2026, the first such instance in Israel's participation history. The Israeli transmission was also shown internationally via the Israeli Network in 2003 and 2004.

Year	Television commentator	Radio commentator	Spokesperson	Ref.
1970	No commentator	Unknown	Did not participate	
1971	No broadcast	Unknown	Did not participate	
1972	No commentator	Unknown	Did not participate	
1973	No commentator	No radio broadcast	No spokesperson	
1974	No commentator	No radio broadcast	Yitzhak Shim'oni	
1975	No commentator	No radio broadcast	Yitzhak Shim'oni	
1976	No commentator	No radio broadcast	Yitzhak Shim'oni	
1977	No commentator	No radio broadcast	Yitzhak Shim'oni	
1978	No commentator	No radio broadcast	Yitzhak Shim'oni	
1979	Yoram Arbel	Yitzhak Shim'oni	Dan Kaner	
1980	No commentator	Unknown	Did not participate	
1981	No commentator	Daniel Pe'er	Dan Kaner	
1982	No commentator	Daniel Pe'er	Yitzhak Shim'oni	
1983	No commentator	Daniel Pe'er	Yitzhak Shim'oni	
1984	Delayed, no commentator	No radio broadcast	Did not participate	
1985	No commentator	Daniel Pe'er	Yitzhak Shim'oni	
1986	No commentator	Daniel Pe'er	Yitzhak Shim'oni	
1987	No commentator	Yigal Ravid	Yitzhak Shim'oni	
1988	No commentator	Yigal Ravid	Yitzhak Shim'oni	
1989	No commentator	Yigal Ravid	Yitzhak Shim'oni	
1990	No commentator	Yigal Ravid	Yitzhak Shim'oni	
1991	No commentator	Yigal Ravid	Yitzhak Shim'oni	
1992	No commentator	Yitzhak Shim'oni	Daniel Pe'er	
1993	No commentator	Daniel Pe'er	Danny Rup	
1994	No commentator	No radio broadcast	Did not participate	
1995	No commentator	Danny Roup	Daniel Pe'er	
1996	No commentator	No radio broadcast	Did not participate	
1997	No commentator	No radio broadcast	Did not participate	
1998	No commentator	Daniel Pe'er	Yigal Ravid	
1999	No commentator	Daniel Pe'er	Yoav Ginai	
2000	No commentator	No radio broadcast	Yoav Ginai	
2001	No commentator	Daniel Pe'er	Yoav Ginai	
2002	No commentator	Daniel Pe'er	Michal Zoharetz	
2003	No commentator	Daniel Pe'er	Michal Zoharetz	
2004	No commentator	No radio broadcast	Merav Miller	
2005	No commentator	No radio broadcast	Dana Herman	
2006	No commentator	No radio broadcast	Dana Herman	
2007	No commentator	No radio broadcast	Jason Danino-Holt	
2008	No commentator	No radio broadcast	Noa Barak-Weshler	
2009	No commentator	No radio broadcast	Ofer Nachshon	
2010	No commentator	No radio broadcast	Ofer Nachshon	
2011	No commentator	No radio broadcast	Ofer Nachshon	
2012	No commentator	No radio broadcast	Ofer Nachshon	
2013	No commentator	Kobi Menora (all shows); Ofer Nachshon (semi-final 1); Amit Kotler, Yuval Caspin (semi-final 2); Ron Levinthal, Kobi Oshrat, Yhaloma Bat Porat (final)	Ofer Nachshon	
2014	No commentator	Kobi Menora, Yuval Caspin (all shows)	Ofer Nachshon	
2015	No commentator	Kobi Menora (all shows); Yuval Caspin (semi-final 1); Tal Argaman (semi-final 2)	Ofer Nachshon	
2016	No commentator	Kobi Menora, Or Vaxman, Nansi Brandes (semi-final 2 and final)	Ofer Nachshon	
2017	No commentator	Kobi Menora, Dori Ben Ze'ev, Alon Amir (all shows)	Ofer Nachshon	
2018	Asaf Liberman, Shir Reuven (semi-final 1); Itai Herman, Goel Pinto (semi-final 2); Erez Tal, Idit Hershkowitz (final)		Lucy Ayoub	
2019	Sharon Taicher, Eran Zarachowicz		Izhar Cohen	
~~2020~~	~~Geula Even-Sa'ar, Asaf Liberman~~		Not announced before cancellation	
2021	Asaf Liberman, Akiva Novick		Lucy Ayoub	
2022	Asaf Liberman, Akiva Novick		Daniel Styopin	
2023	Asaf Liberman, Akiva Novick (all shows); Doron Medalie (final)	Asaf Liberman, Akiva Novick (semi-finals); Kobi Menora, Sharon Kantor (final)	Ilanit	
2024	Asaf Liberman, Akiva Novick (all shows); Yoav Tzafir (final)	Unknown	Maya Alkulumbre	
2025	Asaf Liberman, Akiva Novick (all shows); Keren Peles (final)	Unknown	Eden Golan	
2026	Asaf Liberman, Akiva Novick	Unknown	Lior Suchard	

== Costume designers ==
Year	Costume designers	Ref.
1973	Rozi Ben-Yosef	
1976	Gideon Oberson	
1978	Dorin Frankfurt	
1979	Dorin Frankfurt	
1982	Dorin Frankfurt	
1983	Dorin Frankfurt	
1985	Nissim Mizrachi	
1988	Perach Reuven	
1990	Gideon Oberson	
1991	Yaron Minkowsky	
1995	Yaron Minkowsky	
1998	Galit Levi	
2002	Pnina Tournet	
2005	Riva Oshida	
2009	Riva Oshida	
2011	Jean Paul Gaultier	
2013	Efrat Kalig	
2014	Dana Barak	
2017	David Sassoon	
2018	Maor Zabar	
2021	Alon Livne	
2024	Alon Livne	
2025	Victor Bellaish	

== Photo gallery ==
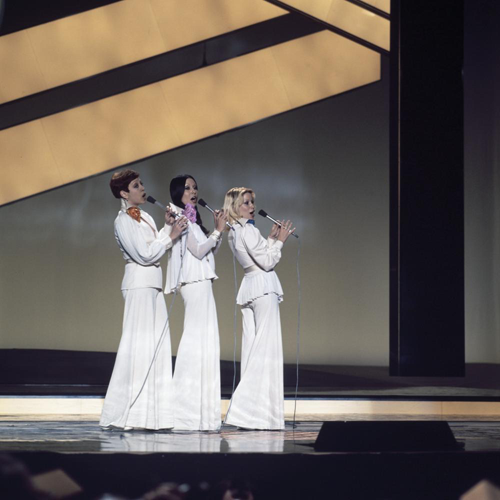
Chocolate, Menta, Mastik in The Hague (1976)

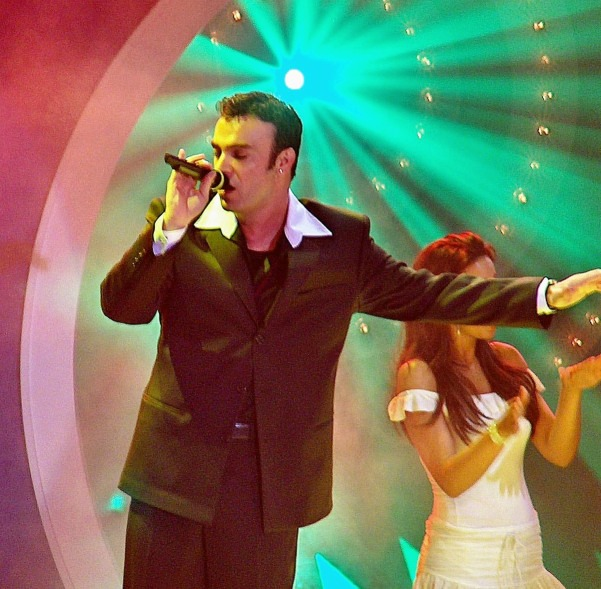
David D'Or in Istanbul (2004)

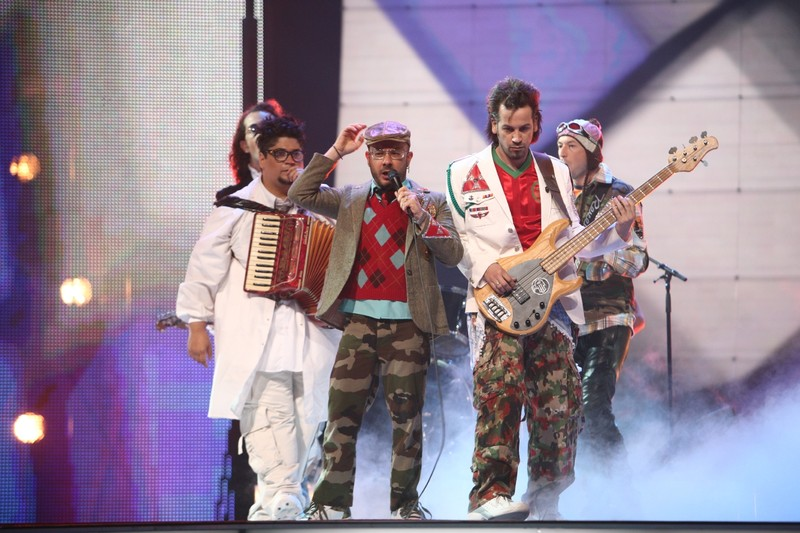
Teapacks in Helsinki (2007)

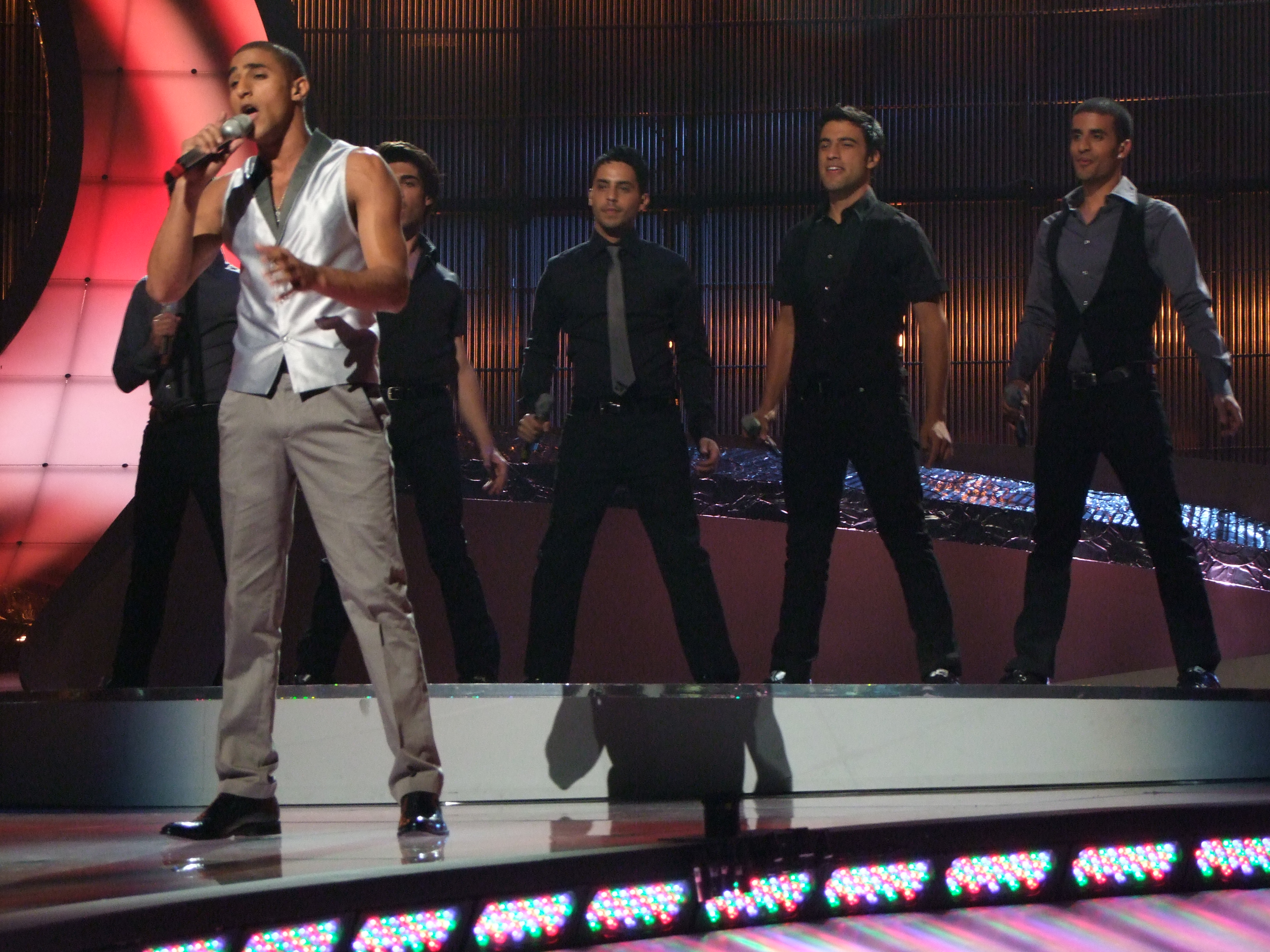
Boaz in Belgrade (2008)

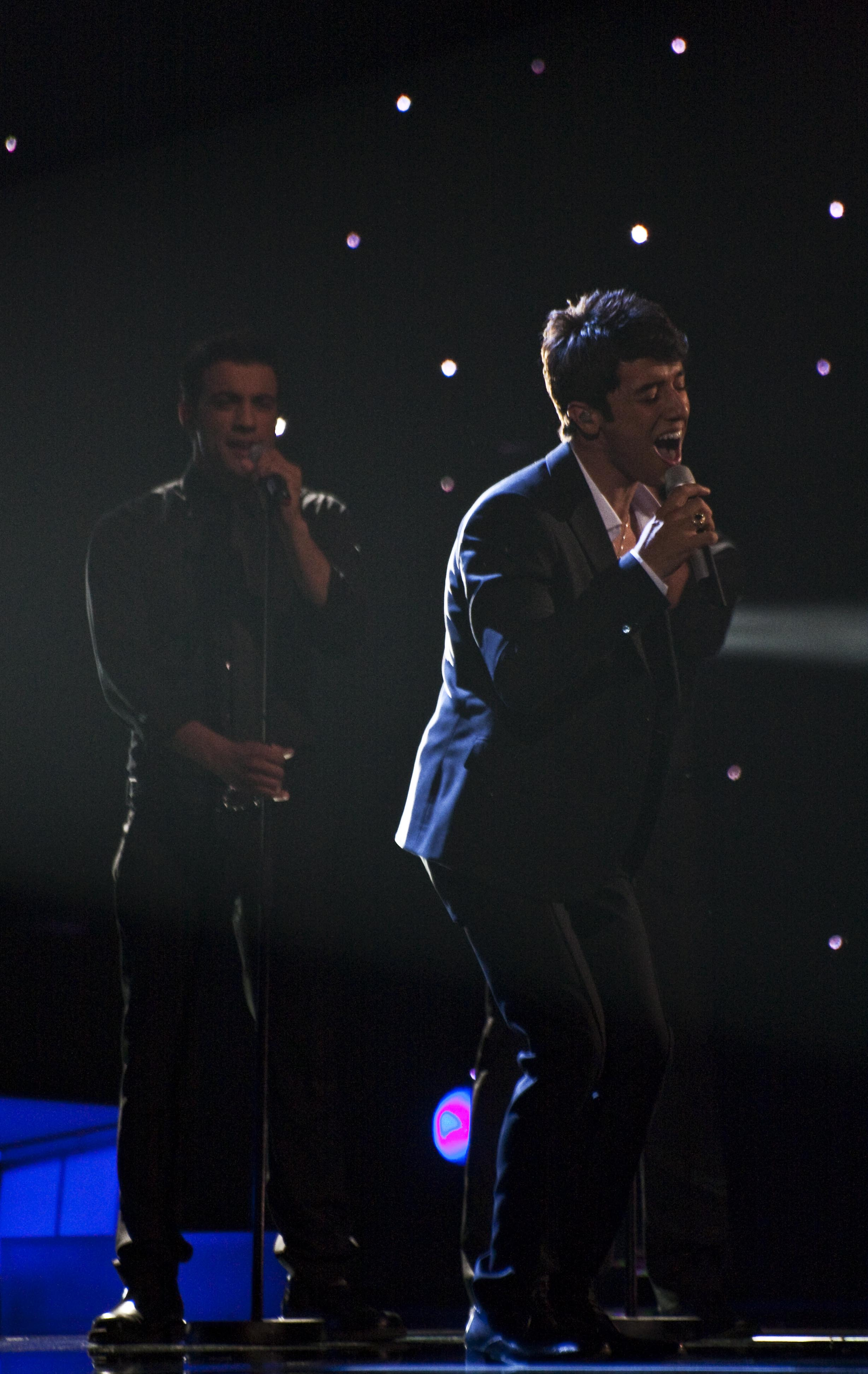
Harel Skaat in Oslo (2010)

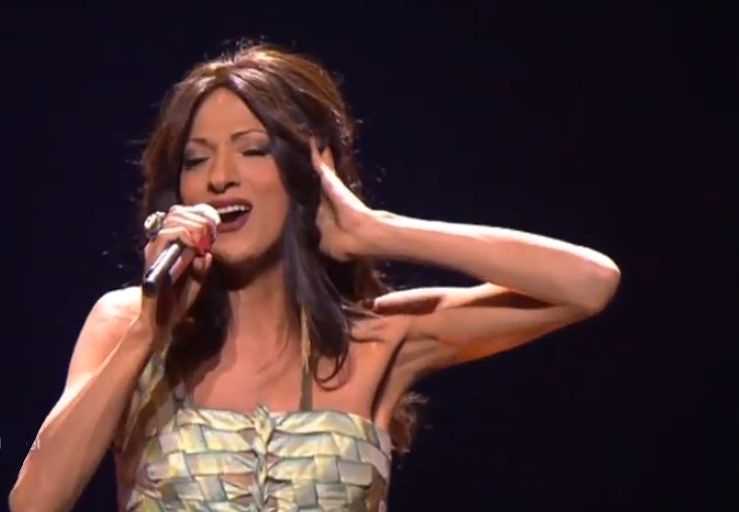
Dana International in Düsseldorf (2011)

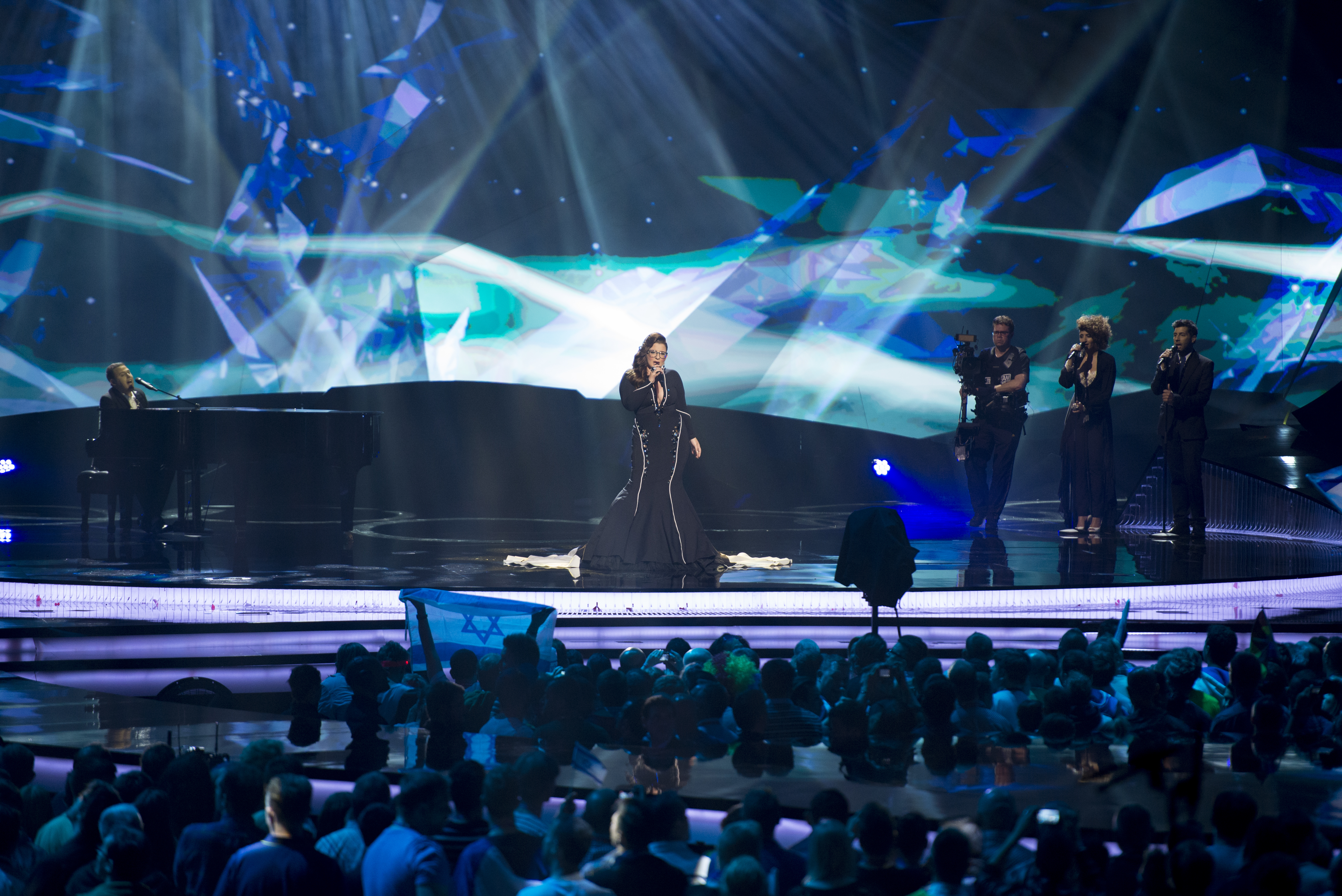
Moran Mazor in Malmö (2013)

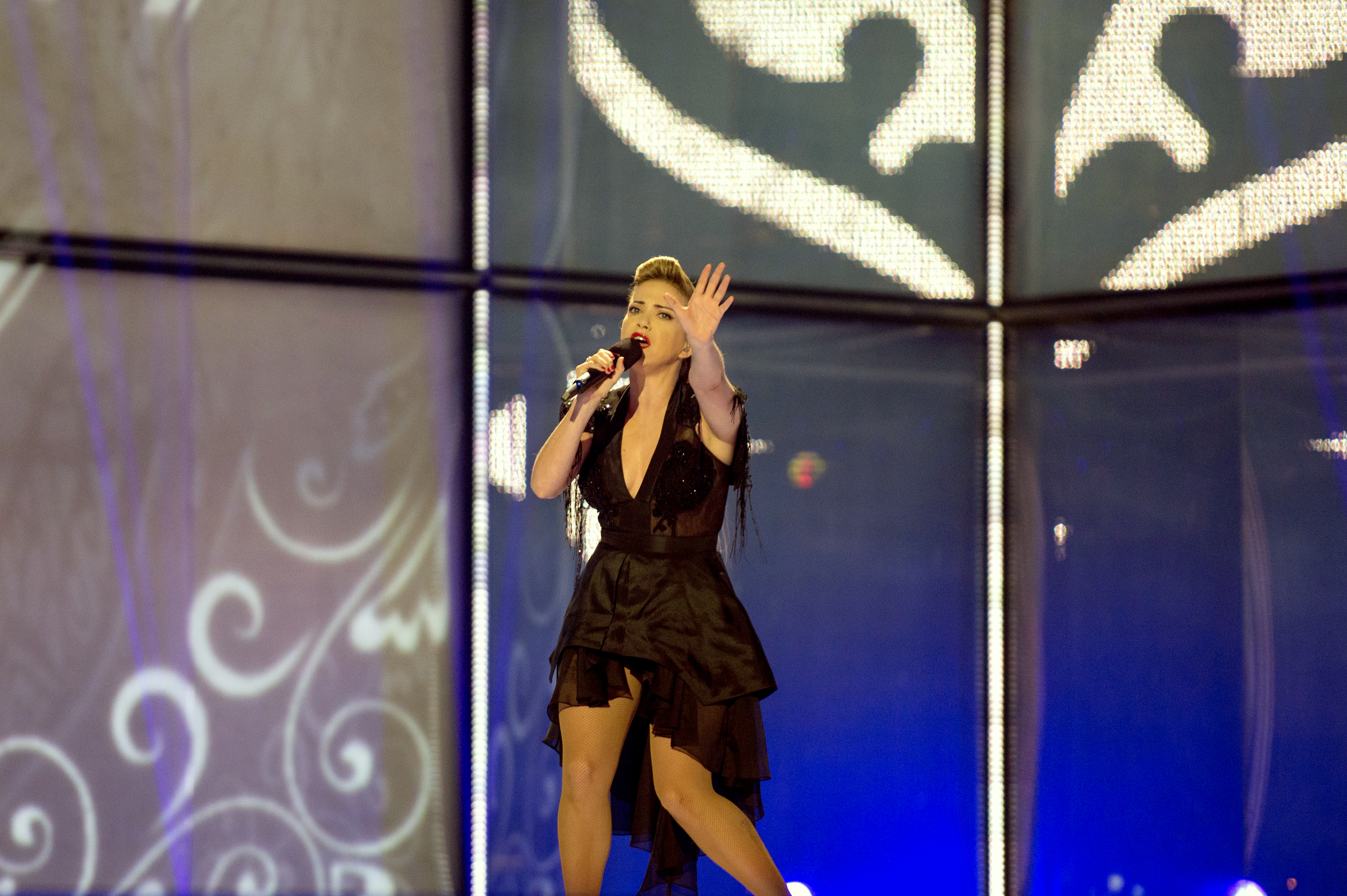
Mei Finegold in Copenhagen (2014)

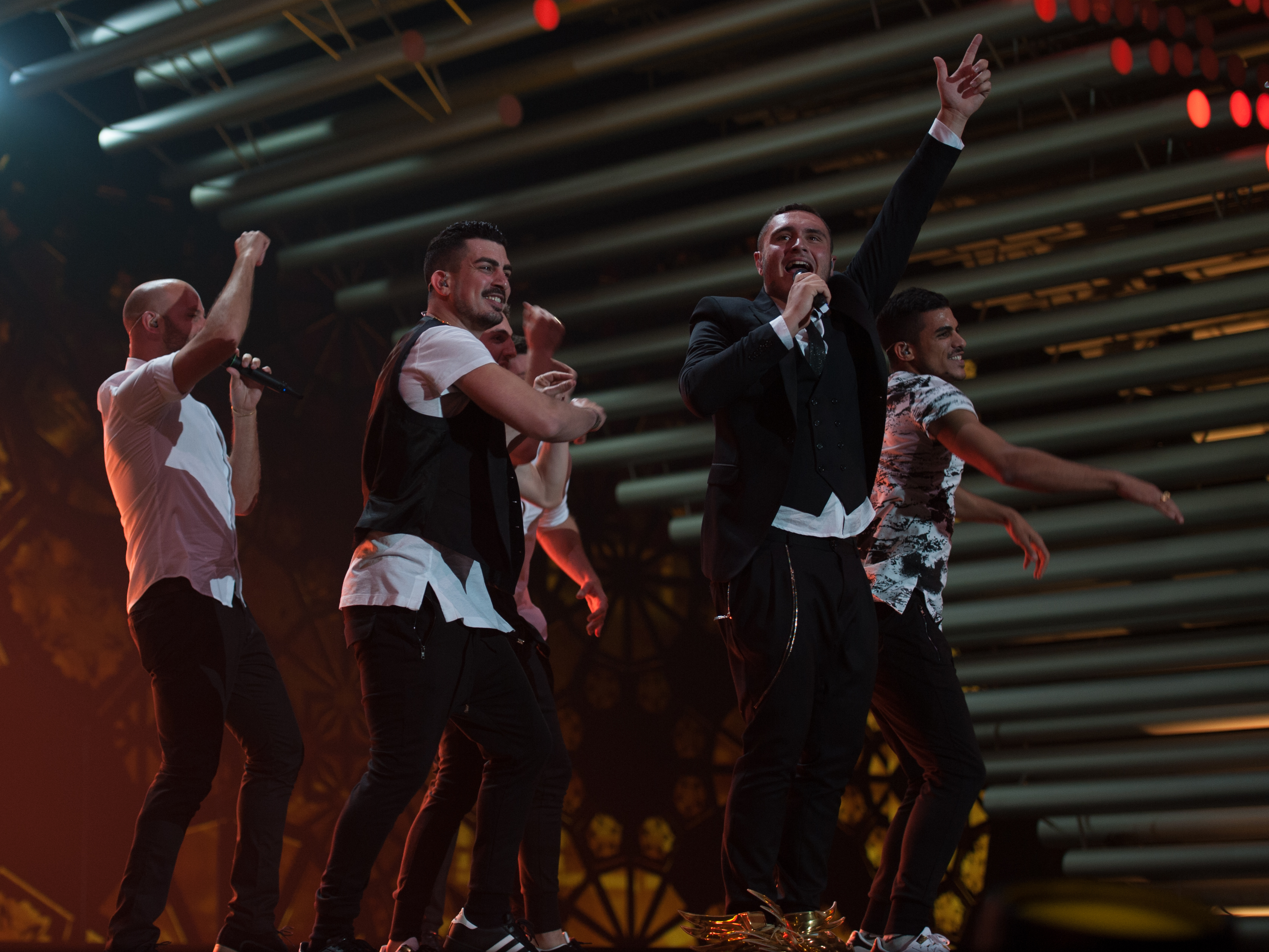
Nadav Guedj in Vienna (2015)

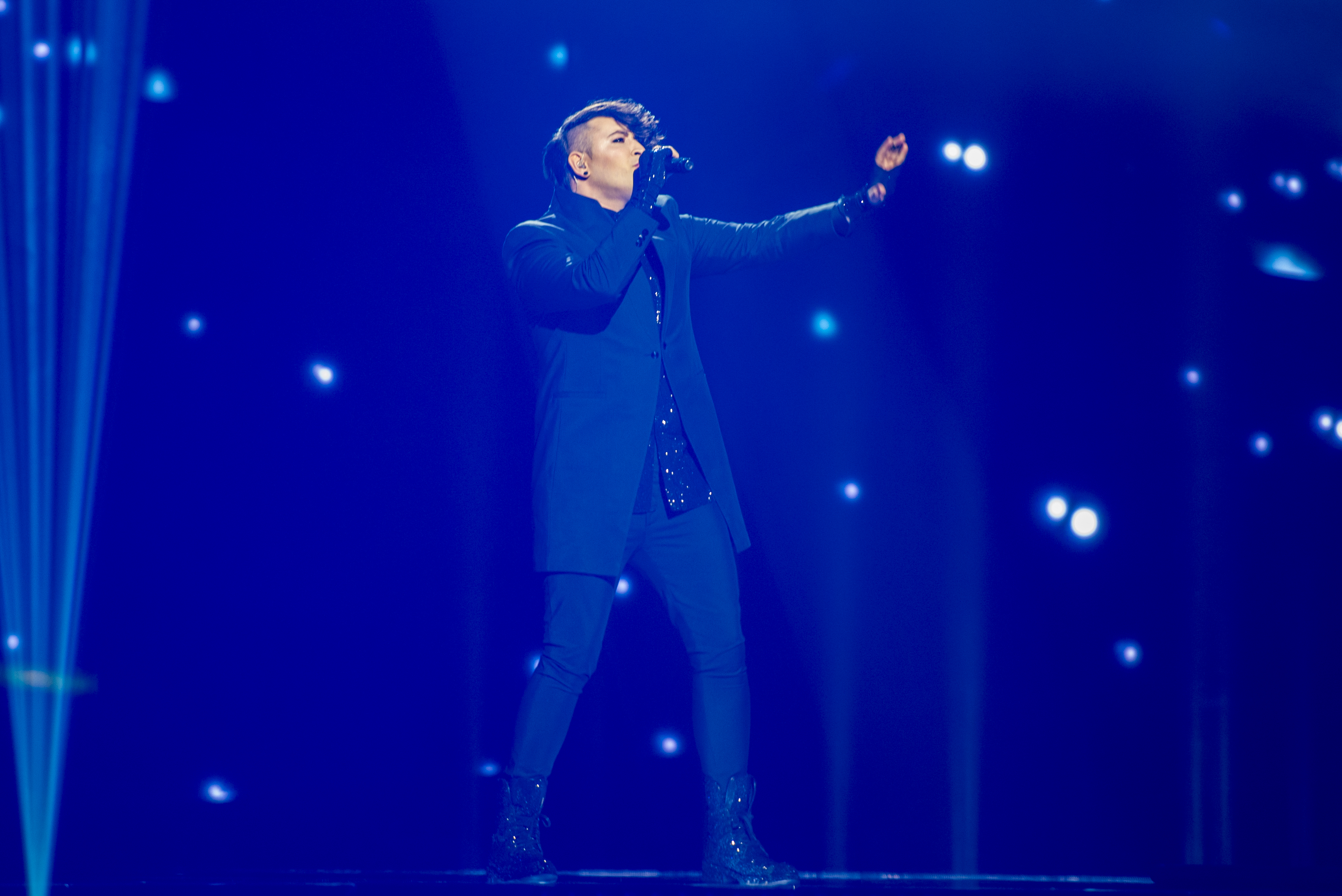
Hovi Star in Stockholm (2016)

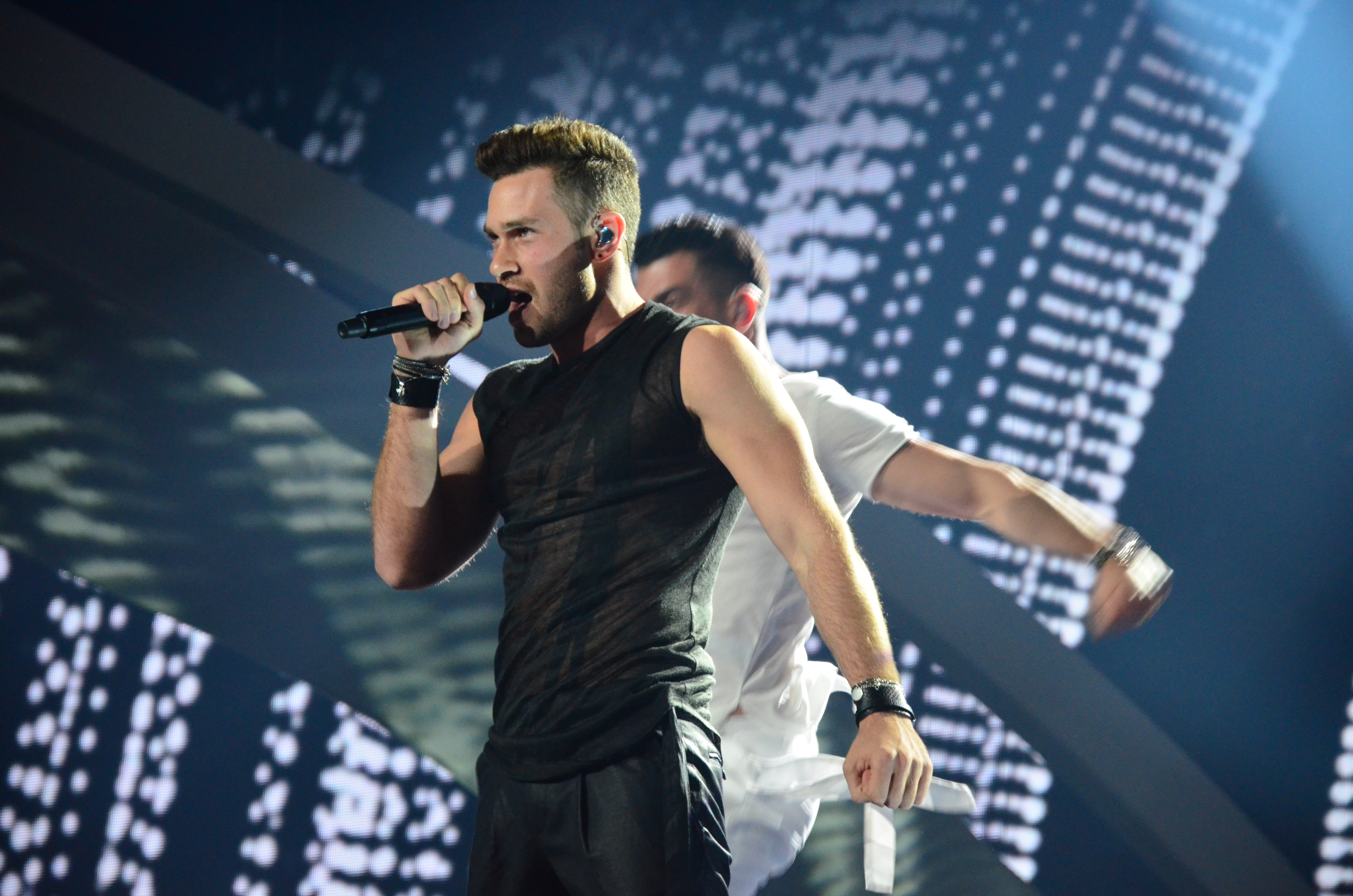
Imri in Kyiv (2017)

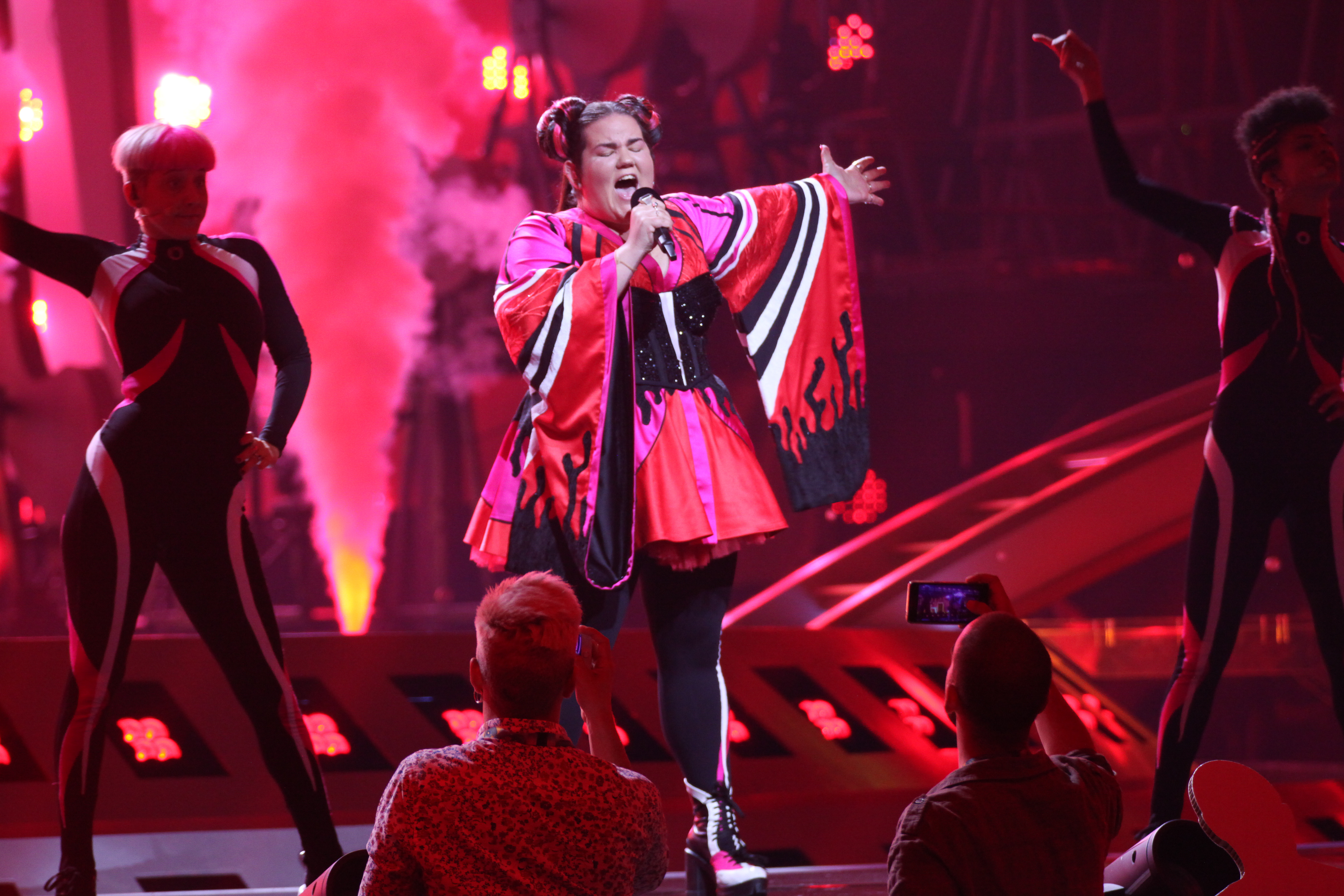
Netta in Lisbon (2018)

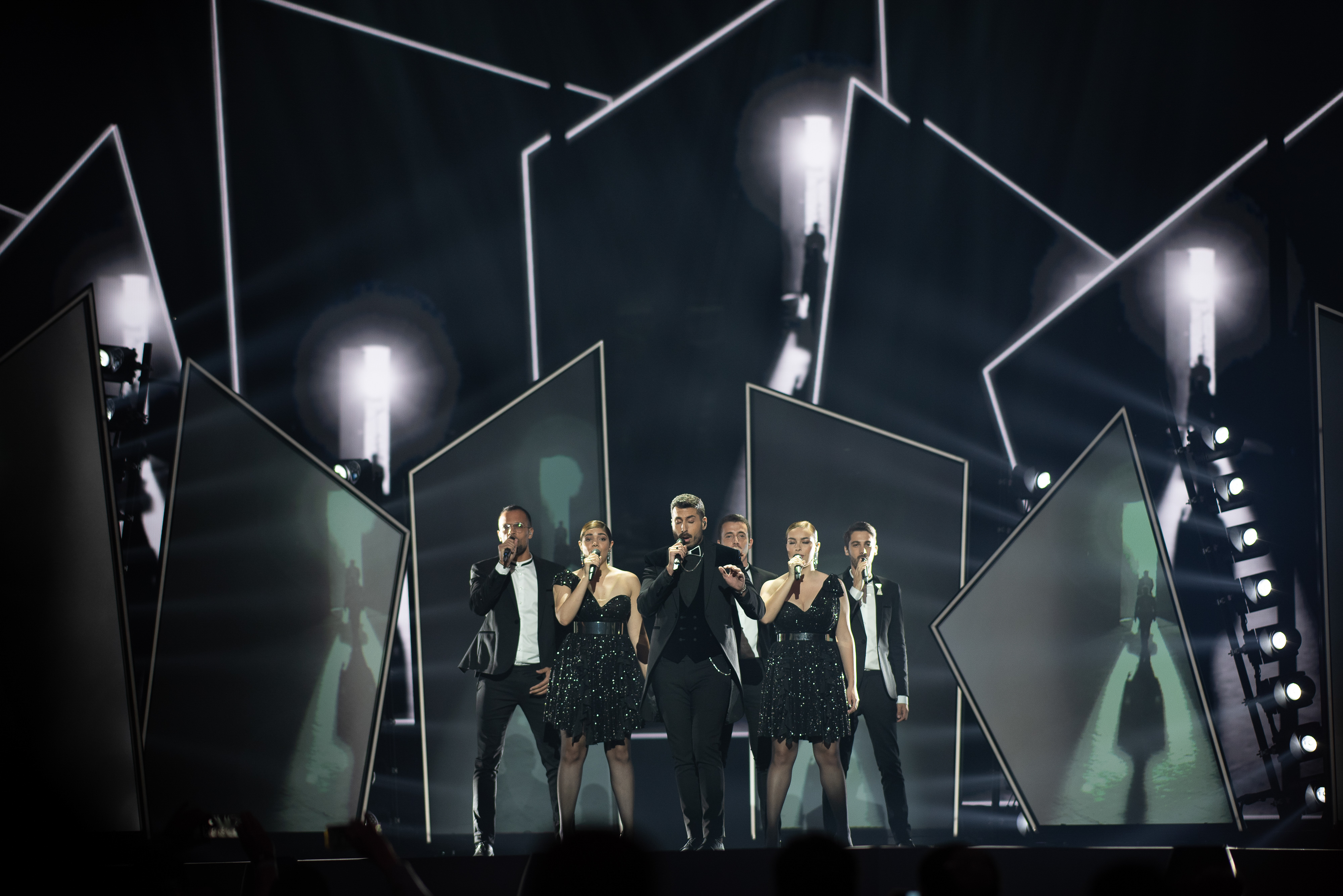
Kobi Marimi in Tel Aviv (2019)

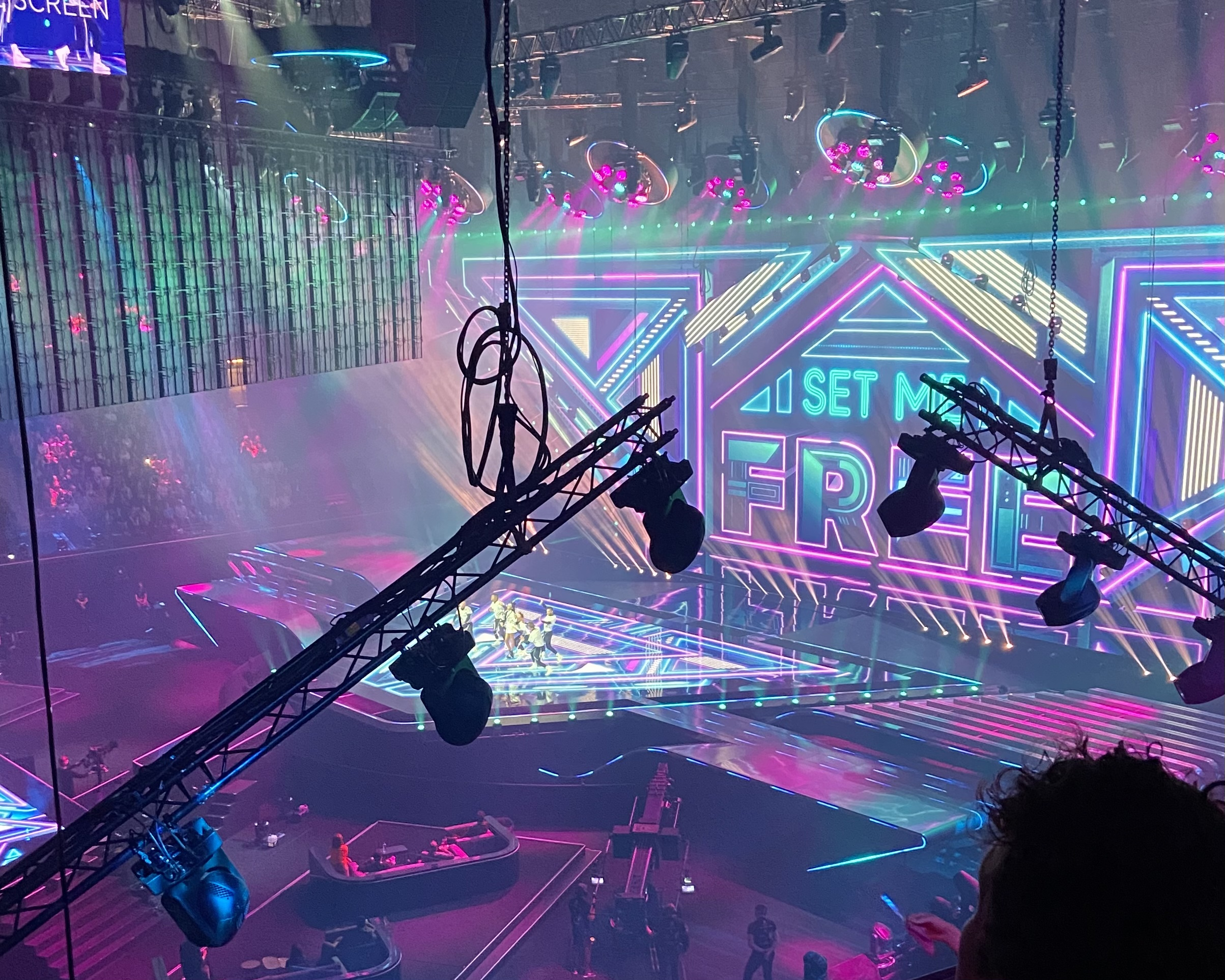
Eden Alene in Rotterdam (2021)

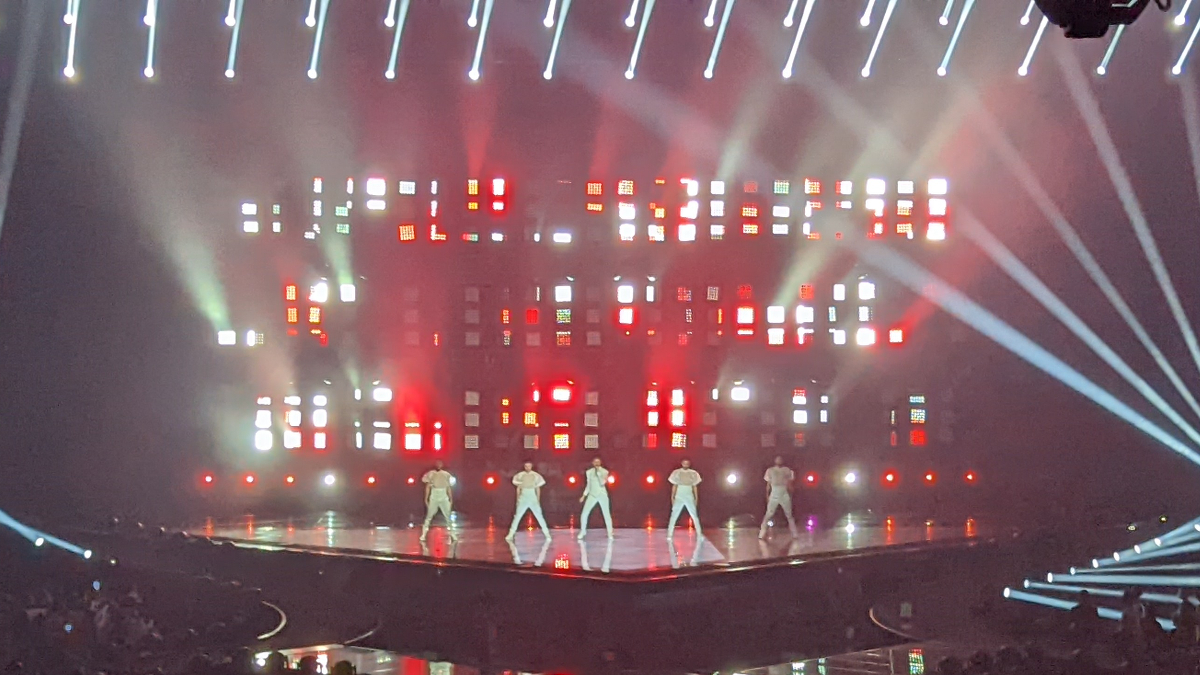
Michael Ben David in Turin (2022)

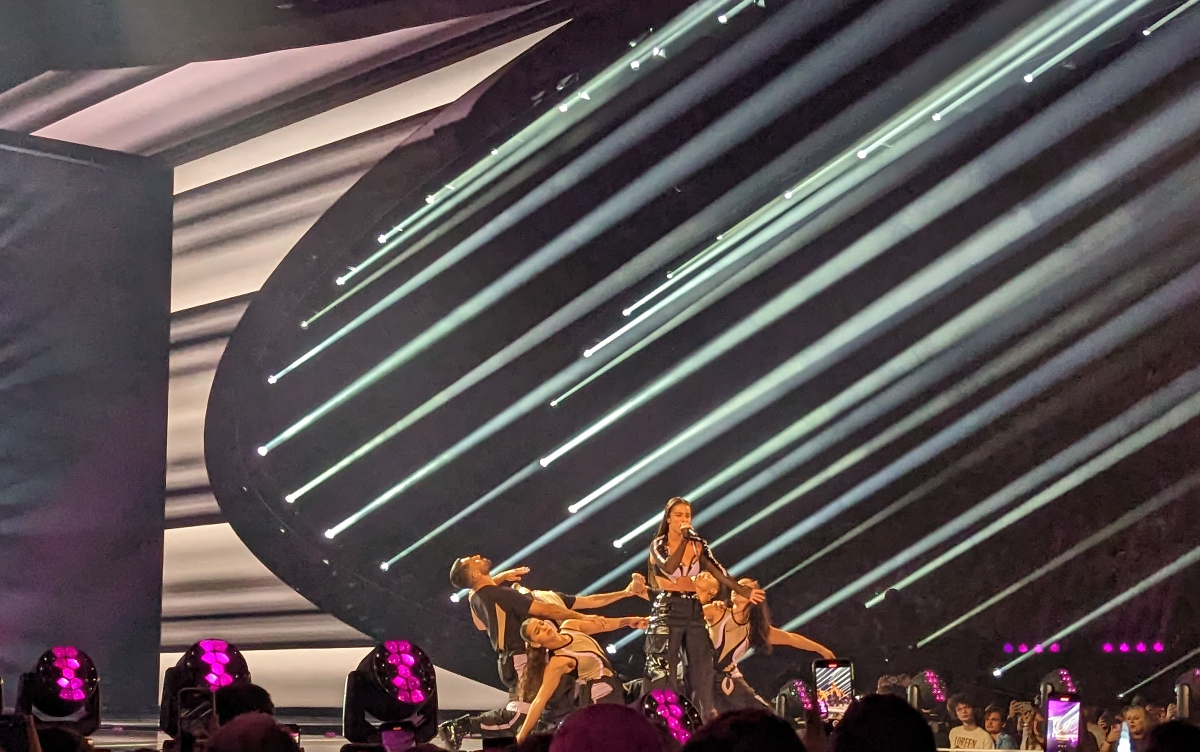
Noa Kirel in Liverpool (2023)

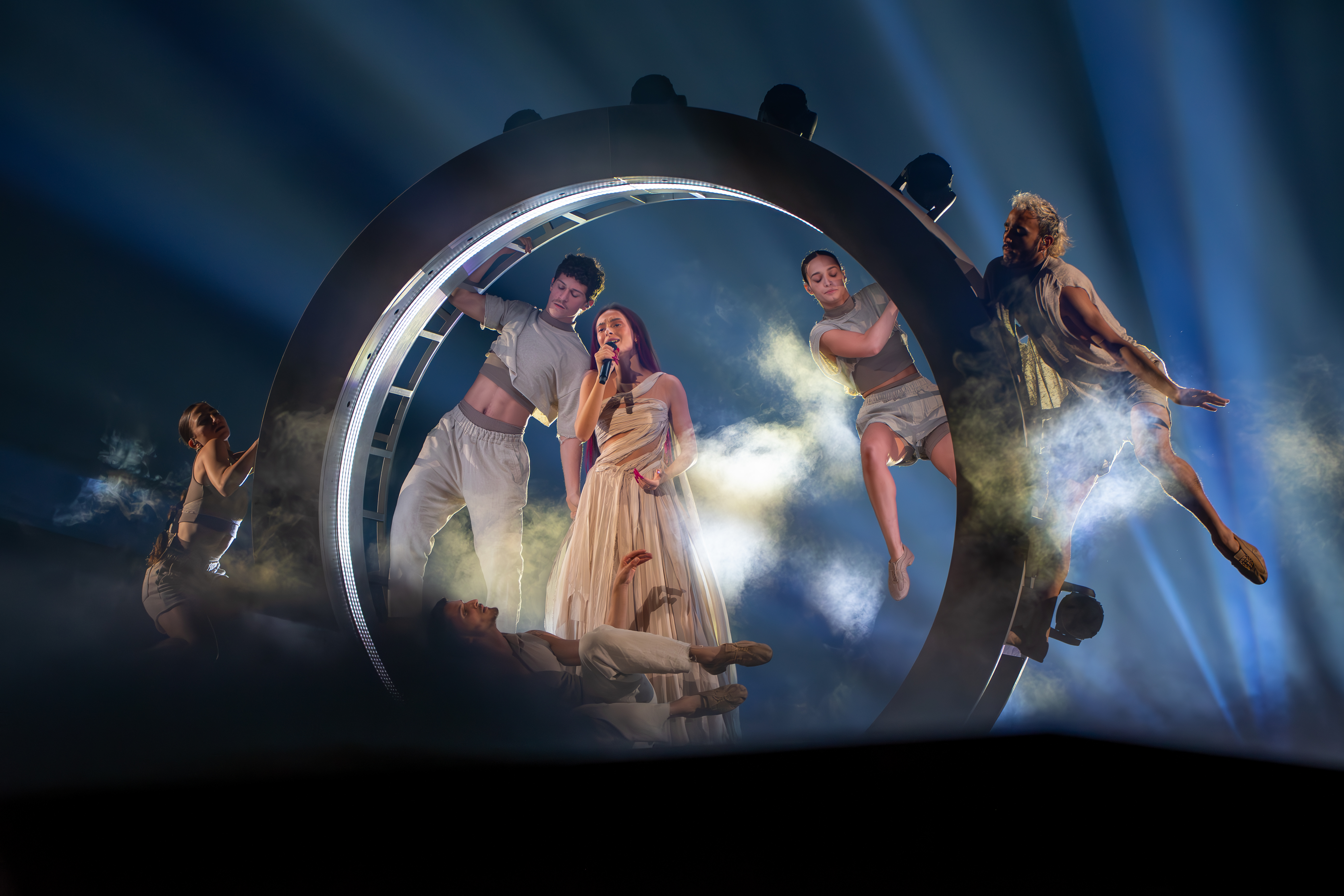
Eden Golan in Malmö (2024)

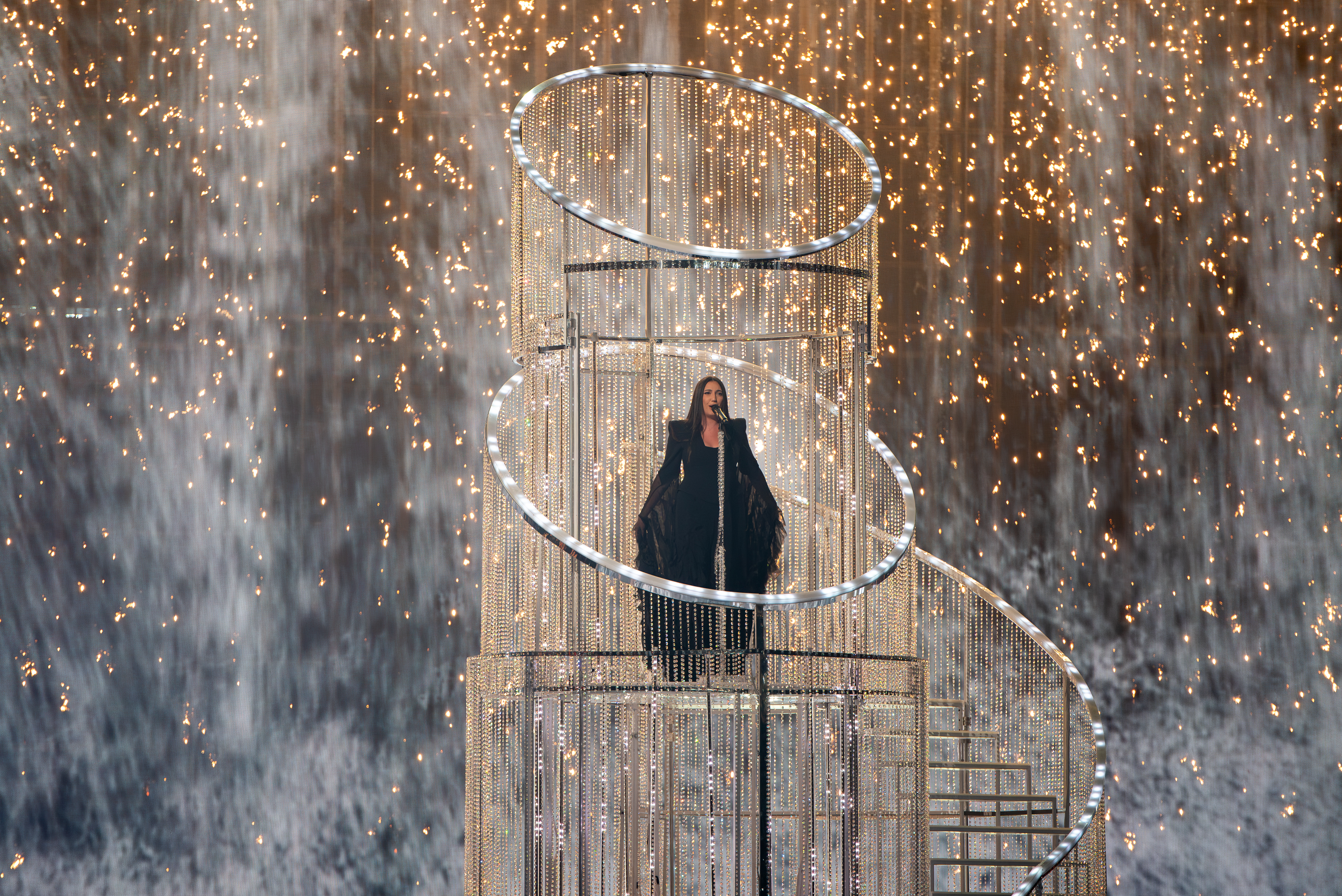
Yuval Raphael in Basel (2025)

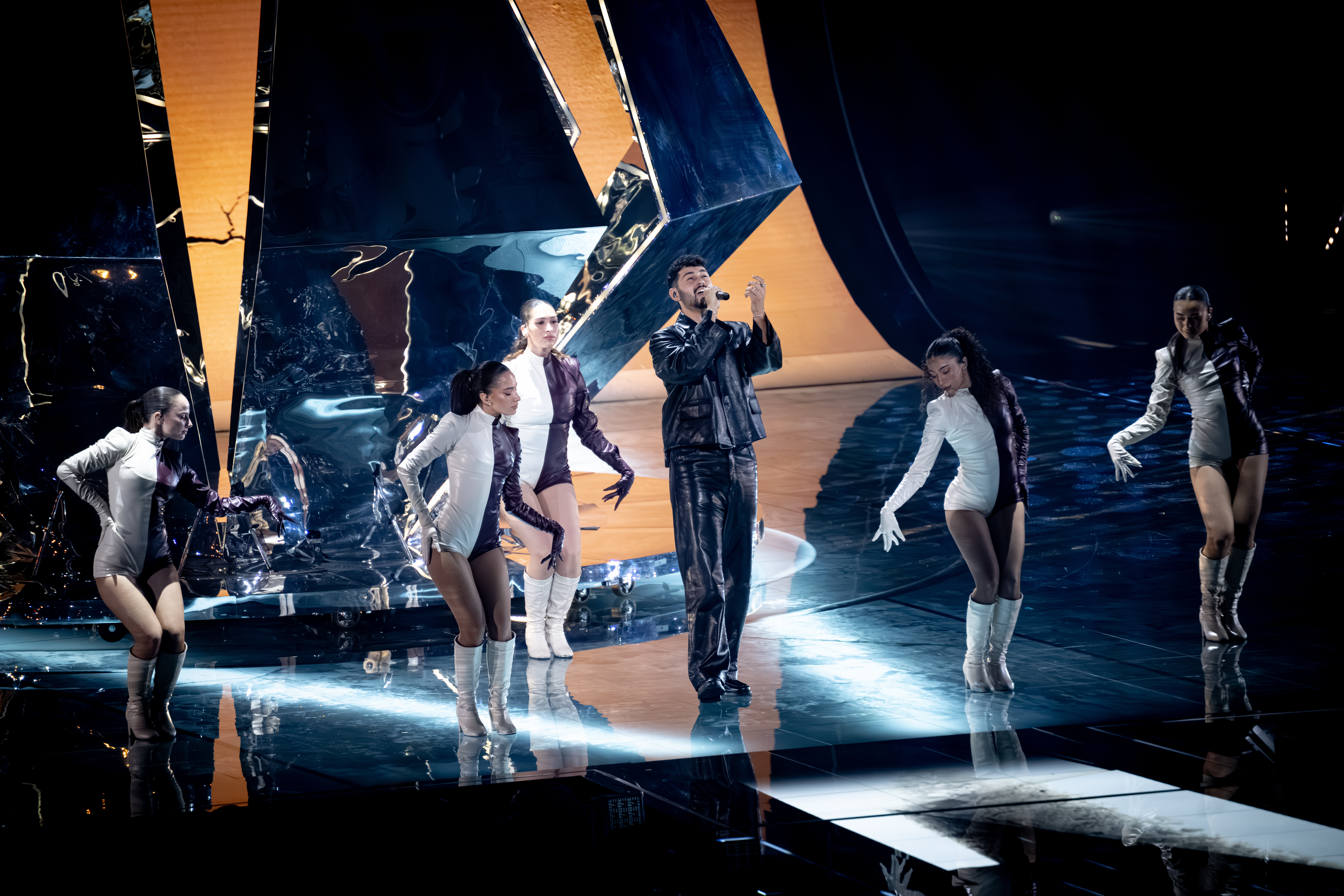
Noam Bettan in Vienna (2026)

== Controversies ==
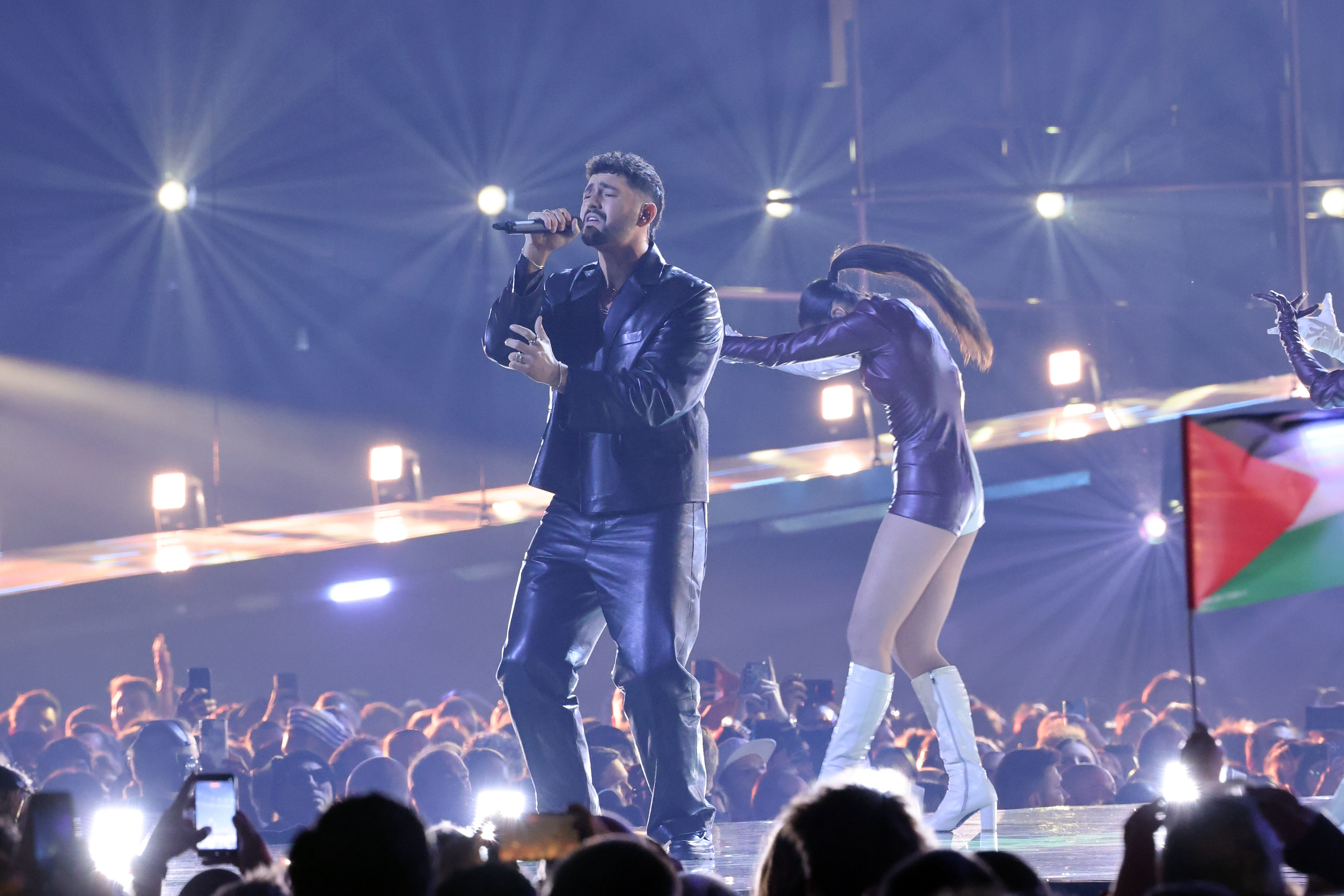
An audience member waved a Palestinian flag as Noam Bettan, the Israeli entrant in 2026, performed on stage

Israel's participation in the contest has resulted in several controversial moments in the past, with the country's first appearance in 1973, less than a year after the Munich massacre, resulting in an increased security presence at the venue in Luxembourg City. Its first win in 1978 proved controversial for Arab states broadcasting the contest which would typically cut to advertisements when Israel performed due to a lack of recognition of the country, and when it became apparent Israel would win, many of these broadcasters cut the feed before the end of the voting. Broadcasters from Arab states which are eligible to compete have largely not participated, with Morocco the only Arab state to have entered Eurovision, competing only once, in 1980 when Israel was absent.

Israel's participation has been criticised by those who oppose current government policies in the state as well as on the Israeli–Palestinian conflict, with calls raised by various political groups for a boycott ahead of the 2019 contest in Tel Aviv, including proponents of the Boycott, Divestment and Sanctions movement in response to the country's policies towards Palestinians in the West Bank and Gaza, as well as groups who take issue with perceived pinkwashing in Israel. Others campaigned against a boycott, asserting that any cultural boycott would be antithetical to advancing peace in the region.

Following the outbreak of the Gaza war and subsequent genocide in October 2023, the Israeli–Palestinian conflict once again impacted the contest, with renewed calls for Israel's exclusion ahead of the 2024 event. "Hurricane", Israel's entry for that year's contest, was accepted by the EBU, although it was required to undergo rewrites as the EBU objected to the political nature of the original lyrics, which made reference to the 7 October attacks. Israel's second-place finish and win in the public vote in 2025 was contested by several participating countries, with Israel having conducted a large advertising campaign to encourage voting for its entry. (Note: Attributed to multiple references:) Broadcasters from Iceland, Ireland, the Netherlands, Slovenia, and Spain boycotted the 2026 edition after Israel was permitted to compete, with 2024 winner Nemo and 1994 winner Charlie McGettigan additionally returning their trophies in protest. Some media outlets described the situation as "the biggest crisis in the contest's history". (Note: By the following sources:)

== See also ==
- Music of Israel
- Controversies of the Eurovision Song Contest

== Sources ==
- O'Connor, John Kennedy (2010). The Eurovision Song Contest: The Official History (2nd ed.). London: Carlton Books. ISBN 978-1-84732-521-1.
- West, Chris (2020). Eurovision! A History of Modern Europe Through the World's Greatest Song Contest (2nd ed.). London: Melville House UK. ISBN 978-1-911545-55-2.
