= Yardena Arazi =

Israeli singer and entertainer

Yardena Arazi ירדנה ארזי
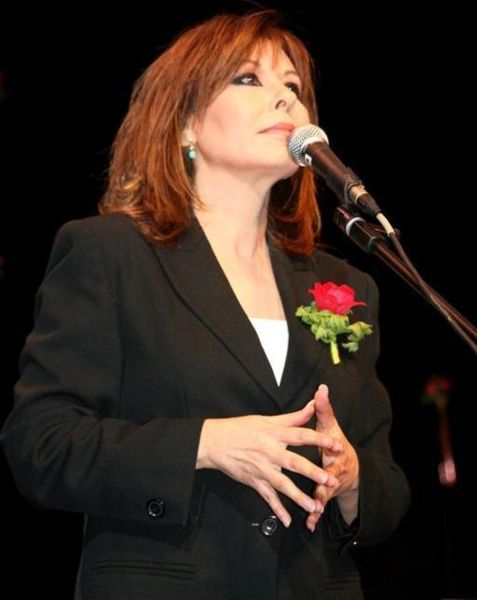

Background information
- Born: Yardena Finebaum; September 25, 1951 (age 74); Kabri, Israel
- Genres: Pop; folk; Zemer ivri
- Occupations: Singer, presenter
- Years active: 1965–present
- Labels: Hed Arzi; NTE
- Formerly of: Chocolate, Menta, Mastik

Yardena Shulamit Arazi (Hebrew: ירדנה שולמית ארזי; born Yardena Finebaum; September 25, 1951) is an Israeli singer and entertainer. In 2008 Arazi was named the most popular Israeli singer of all time at the 60th Independence Day celebration.

== Early life ==
Yardena Finebaum was born in kibbutz Kabri, Israel. Her father was an immigrant from Germany who was an Irgun veteran and one of the founders of kibbutz Beit HaArava. Her mother was an immigrant from France with origins in Poland and Ukraine, and was a cousin of Marcel Marceau. At the age of two, her family moved to Haifa, Israel, where she grew up. The family also lived briefly in France. She joined the Beit Rothschild group at age 16 and became its lead vocalist. She did her military service in the Nahal entertainment troupe.

== Career ==
=== 1970s ===
In the 1970s, Yardena Arazi was a member of the female vocal trio Chocolate, Menta, Mastik along with Leah Lupatin and Ruthie Holzman. The group represented Israel in the Eurovision Song Contest 1976 with the song Emor Shalom ("Say Hello"), placing sixth. After the Eurovision competition, they began an international tour that included Brazil, Sweden, Germany, the Netherlands and Belgium; releasing several singles in English, French and German and appeared in many TV shows all over Europe. Arazi left the band in 1978.

In 1979, the Israel Broadcasting Authority (IBA) asked Arazi to co-host the Eurovision Song Contest in Jerusalem with news anchor Daniel Pe'er. Arazi, who is fluent in Hebrew and French presented in those languages while Pe'er presented in Hebrew and English. Her hosting received positive reviews across Europe and she participated in TV shows in the Netherlands with Milk and Honey and in Belgium with Mike Burstyn. Arazi was signed to a recording contract with record label Ariola Records and released a mini-album with songs written by Bernd Meinunger. During this period she met Natan Tomer and decided to return to Israel.

=== 1980s ===
During the 1980s Arazi was one of the most successful singers in Israel, being named as the top female singer of the year five times and as the top female singer of the decade; releasing 10 gold and platinum albums. She kept performing internationally including in Poland with Israel Philharmonic Orchestra and Zubin Mehta, in Australia, Turkey, the United States and Egypt.

Arazi took part at the domestic Israeli Eurovision competition (Kdam) as a singer in 1982, 1983, and 1985 and as a co-host in 1987. In 1988, she was selected internally by IBA to sing the Israeli entry for Eurovision and during a special TV show, in which she presented four new songs, the entry was chosen. Eventually, she went to Dublin with the song Ben Adam ("Human Being"), which came in seventh. Arazi has always been highly superstitious and consults an astrologer on all matters in her life. The astrologer told her the song performed 9th would win the competition in Dublin, Ireland. Israel had drawn 9th in the running order, so Arazi agreed to represent Israel. However, when Cyprus withdrew from the contest, Israel's position shifted to 8th. The 9th song did win the competition; with the Swiss, represented by Celine Dion, triumphing from that position.

In 1989 Arazi recorded the album Desert Fantasy than included 10 Hebrew versions of Arabic songs originally written and sung by Farid al-Atrash, Fairuz, Abdul Halim, Samira Said and others. The album was also released in the US and Japan and was hugely successful around the Middle East.

=== 21st century ===
Since 1997, Arazi has focused on her career as a TV host. For 9 years she co-hosted the channel 2 morning magazine Cafe Telad.

Later on, she hosted on Channel 1 (Shir Hashishim), Channel 2 (Malkot Hashabat), and GLZ radio station.

== Personal life ==
Arazi is married to engineer Nathan Tomer, with whom she has one daughter, Alona. On her 70th birthday, the municipality of Haifa announced the naming of Yardena Arazi Street in the Givat Zemer neighborhood in her honour.

Awards and achievements
| Preceded by Shlomo Artzi with At Va'Ani | Israel in the Eurovision Song Contest (as part of Chocolate, Menta, Mastik); 1976 | Succeeded by Ilanit with Ahava Hi Shir Lishnayim |
| Preceded by (France) Denise Fabre and Léon Zitrone | Eurovision Song Contest presenter (with Daniel Pe'er); 1979 | Succeeded by (Netherlands) Marlous Fluitsma |
| Preceded by Lazy Bums with Shir Habatlanim | Israel in the Eurovision Song Contest; 1988 | Succeeded by Gili & Galit with Derekh Hamelekh |
