= Shokolad, Menta, Mastik =

Israeli female musical trio

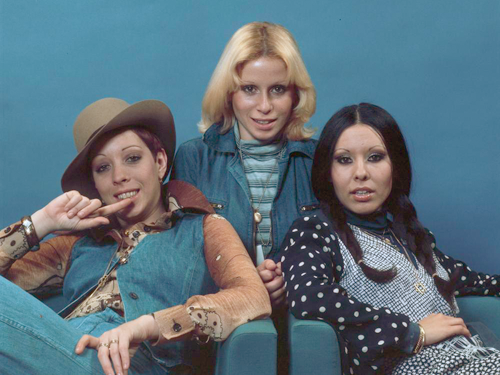
- Shokolad, Menta, Mastik in 1976; From left to right: Ruthie Holzman, Leah Lupatin and Yardena Arazi

Background information
- Genres: Israeli music
- Years active: 1972–1978
- Labels: Hed Arzi Music
- Members: Yardena Arazi; Ruthie Holzman; Leah Lupatin
- Past members: Tami Azaria

Shokolad, Menta, Mastik (Hebrew: שוקולד מנטה מסטיק, English translation: Chocolate, mint, gum) was an Israeli musical trio active from 1972 to 1978. It initially consisted of Yardena Arazi, Ruthie Holzman and Tami Azaria. Azaria was replaced by Leah Lupatin in 1973.

All the performers served in the Israel Defense Forces as part of Lehakat HaNahal. The trio performed both in Israel and internationally, especially after being Israel's 1976 entry to the Eurovision Song Contest with "Emor Shalom".

Leah Lupatin later worked with 1979 Eurovision winners Milk and Honey, replacing Gali Atari to perform their winning Eurovision entry "Hallelujah" in live concerts, including the 1981 Songs of Europe programme.

Awards and achievements
Preceded by Shlomo Artzi with At Va'Ani	Israel in the Eurovision Song Contest; 1976	Succeeded by Ilanit with Ahava Hi Shir Lishnayim
