= Eddie Butler (singer) =

American singer

Eddie Butler (Hebrew: אדי בטלר; born October 2, 1971) is an Israeli singer. He was born in Dimona to a family of Black Hebrew Israelites from Chicago. Butler started performing at the age of eight. In the 1990s he sang with wedding bands, and in 1992 worked as a backing singer for Zehava Ben.

In 1999 Butler represented Israel at the Eurovision Song Contest in Jerusalem as part of the Eden group which consisted of Eddie, Eddie's older brother Gabriel Butler, Rafael Dahan and Doron Oren. Their song "Happy Birthday" finished 5th with 93 points.

Eden broke up in 2001, and after the group's breakup, Butler launched a solo career. He has performed throughout Europe, Russia and the United States. In 2002 he got the Special Audience Prize of the international music competition New Wave in Jūrmala, Latvia. He represented his home country as a soloist at the Eurovision Song Contest 2006 in Athens with the song "Together We Are One" but finished in second-last place.

Eddie proposed to his wife Orly Burg at the Dudu Topaz show on Channel 2. He performed for her his new song At HaHalom (You Are the Dream) written for her during his long performance tours. He has officially converted to Judaism in order to be able to have an Orthodox wedding with Orly.

Awards and achievements
Preceded by Dana International with Diva	Israel in the Eurovision Song Contest) (As part of Eden); 1999	Succeeded by Ping Pong with Sameyakh
Preceded by Shiri Maimon with Hasheket Shenish'ar	Israel in the Eurovision Song Contest; 2006	Succeeded by Teapacks with Push the Button
