= Teapacks =

Israeli band

Teapacks טיפקס
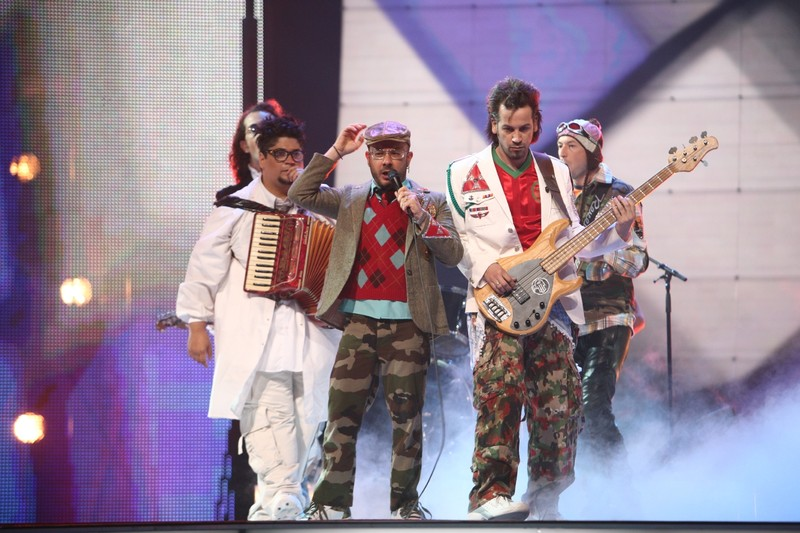
- Teapacks in Eurovision 2007

Background information
- Also known as: HaHotzaa LePoel (1988–1989); Tipex (1989–1995)
- Origin: Sderot, Israel
- Genres: Rock, Pop, Mizrahi
- Years active: 1988–2009; 2013–present
- Labels: Hed-Arzi, Helicon, Anana
- Members: Kobi Oz; Ram Yosifov; Gal Peremen; Tamir Yemini; Shahar Yampolsky; Noam Chen; Adam Mader; Sefi Asfuri-Hirsch; Danielle Krief
- Past members: Einav Cohen; Yoav Nagar; Vered Messika-Rieger; Avinoam Marton; Ronit Shefi; Avi Albocher; Uri Miles; Nuriel Amar; Sharon Ben Zadok; Dani Aberjel; Moti Yosef; Noam Yankelevich; Meir Amar
- Website: Official website

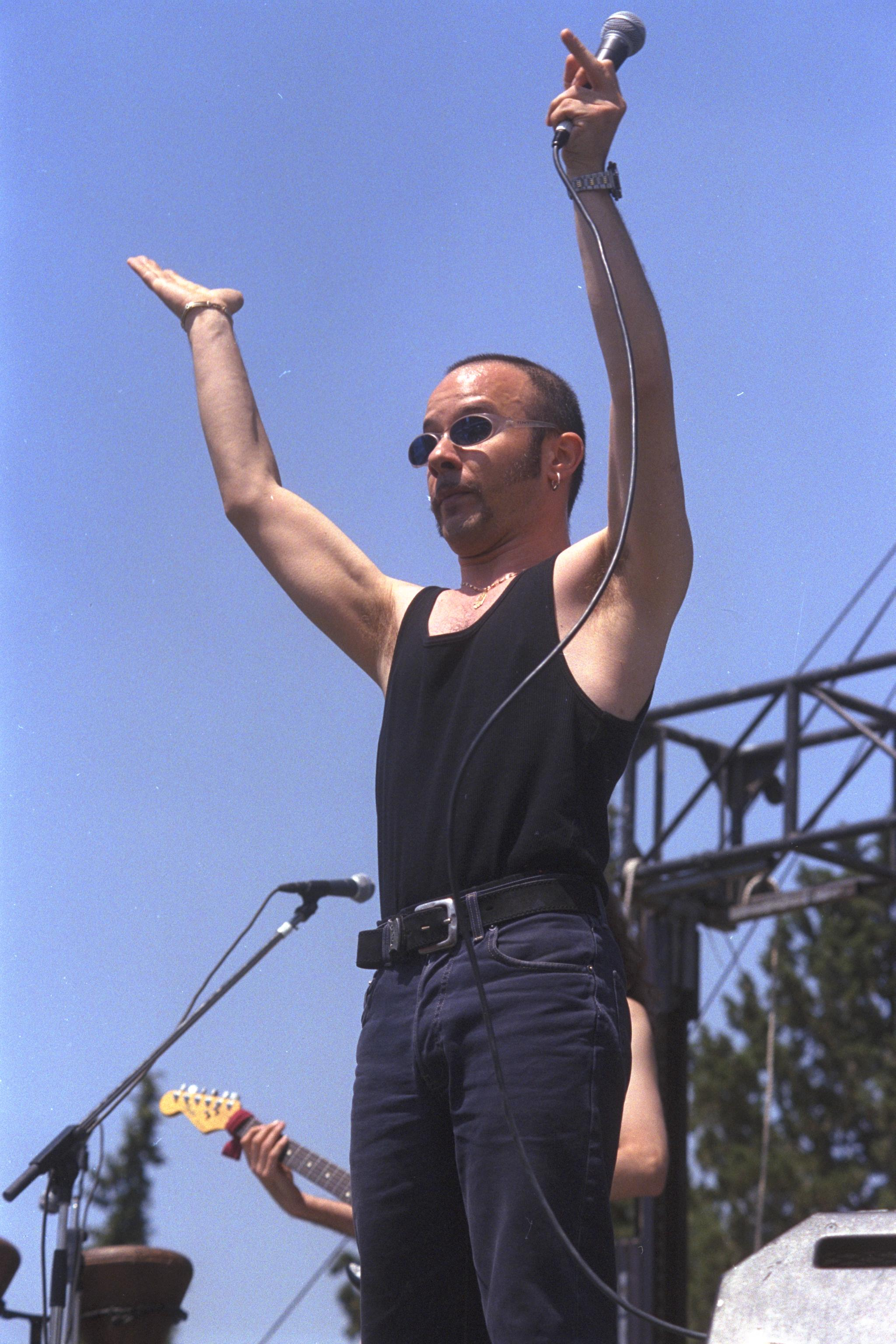
Vocalist Kobi Oz and guitarist Rami Yosifov (hidden behind Oz) performing on Students Day at the Hebrew University of Jerusalem, 21 May 1997

Teapacks (also known as Tipex) (Hebrew: טיפקס) is an Israeli band that formed in 1988 as HaHotzaa La'Poal (Hebrew: ההוצאה לפועל, The Execution) in the southern Israeli city of Sderot. Originally the band was named after the correction fluid Tipp-Ex, but in 1995 the transliteration was changed so as not to infringe on the well-known brand, while keeping the pronunciation and spelling in Hebrew the same.

Each member of the band has a diverse background, and as a whole the band has Tunisian, Moroccan, Bulgarian, Romanian, Syrian, Polish, Russian, and Yemenite heritage. Teapacks gained popularity by bringing forward traditional Israeli-oriental music combined with light humorous hints. The band leader, Kobi Oz, is well known within Israel for his eccentric looks and style. The band has released eight albums plus a greatest hits collection, which collectively have sold over 300,000 copies. Teapacks has been chosen “Band of the Year” numerous times by Israeli radio stations.

== History ==
=== Early years: 1988-1994 ===
HaHotzaa LaPoal began on 6 November 1988 when vocalist/keyboardist Kobi Oz and bassist Gal Peremen met at a kibbutz in southern Israel. They began playing songs written by Oz and were soon joined by guitarist Einav Cohen and drummer Tamir Yemini. The group held their first concert at Kibbutz Dorot in December 1988. They released two singles, "Silonim" (Jets) and "Lispor kvasim" (Counting Sheep), in 1988 and 1989 respectively, under Oz' name. In 1989, Yemini and Cohen left HaHotzaa LaPoal and were replaced by Yoav Nagar and Ram Yosifov. Later that year, the group changed their name to Tipex and released a five-song demo tape. According to Oz, the name symbolized "wip[ing] out differences between people". They performed the songs "Lispor kvasim" and "Im yipol gorale" (If Fate Were to Befall Us) at a festival in February 1990.

In September that year, the band, comprising Oz, Peremen, Cohen and Nagar, recorded two songs, "Haavel" (The Injustice) and "Boi Elai" (Come To Me). At the end of that year, Yosifov returned to Tipex, replacing Cohen. To this day, Oz, Peremen and Yosifov remain the sole constant members of the band since 1991 and are often identified with the band. In 1991, Nagar left the group and was replaced by Avinoam Marton. This lineup released their debut album Shvil klipot hagarinim in September 1992, featuring the hit single "Harabi Joe Capara" (Rabbi Joe Capara). They were midway through recording the followup, Haacharon baasiron hatachton (The Last of the Lower Class), when Yemini returned to the band, replacing Marton. The album was released in November 1993 featuring the hits "Betoch niyar eiton" (Rolled Up in a Newspaper), "Zmanim ktanim" (Small Times) and "Anana" (Cloud).

=== First success and departure of Yemini: 1995-1998 ===
In 1995, the group renamed themselves initially to Tea Packs (the space was later dropped), due to Oz finding out that people were using Tipp-Ex fluid as a recreational drug, and released their third album, Hachaim shelcha belafa (Your Life in a Lapha). It featured the singles "Ma asit?" (What Have You Done?), "Yesh li chavera" (I Have a Girlfriend), "Vehapam shir ahava" (Yet Another Love Song) and "Hatachana hayeshana" (The Old Station). The following year, the group recorded the soundtrack to the hit comedy film Dogs are Colour Blind. Oz also shaved his head.

Neshika ladod, the group's fifth album, was released in 1997, featuring the singles "Lama halacht mimenu" (Why Did You Leave Me?, a duet with the then-unknown Sarit Hadad), "Stam" (Simply) and "Eize olam" (What a World). Yemini left the group after the tour to support the album. He was replaced with Motti Yosef. The group also took on Dani Aberjel as second guitarist, Noam Yankelevich as keyboardist and Meir "Big M" Amar as DJ, sampler and sound engineer. This is the lineup of Teapacks most recognised outside Israel, since they performed at Eurovision 2007.

=== Later years: 1999-2007 ===
The first release with this lineup was "Disko menayak" (Disco Maniac - "Maniac" being a derogatory term for the police), with the hits "Sami veSomo" (Sami and Somo), "Shalosh balayla" (3 in the night) and "Kshani eitcha ani kemo dag" (When I'm With You I'm Like a Fish). In 2001, they released Yoshvim bebeit kafe (Sitting in a Cafe), from which the title track and "Kemo lifnei 20 shana" (Like It Was 20 Years Ago) were released as singles.

In 2002, the band released the non-album single "Avaryan tzatzua" (Wannabe Criminal), a tie-in song to Oz' book of the same name, which was released concurrently with the song. The following year, they released the non-album singles "Hayamim haacherim" (The Other Days) and "Kol yom ani kimaat" (Every Day I Feel...).

In June 2003, Teapacks released the single "Rikudei amba" (Amba Dancing - a parody of the rikudei am dances popular in Israel) and their greatest hits album Kol halehitim, featuring a bonus disc Haosef Haalternateapacks containing "Avaryan tzatzua", "Kol yom ani kimaat", five more songs from their albums and five remixes. Kol halehitim also featured a cover of the Israeli national anthem Hatikva, performed with Sarit Hadad. A Russian version of "Rikudei amba", "Tantsuyem amba", was also recorded, being released for free from the Teapacks website at that time and as a B-side to a promotional single.

In 2005, the group released the non-album single "Sof hashavua masiba" (Weekend Party). The following year, they released the album Radio/Musika/Ivrit (either "Radio/Music/Hebrew" or "Radio Hebrew Music"), featuring the singles "Kluv shel zahav" (Cage of Gold) and "Perach ha-shchunot" (Flower of the Community). The song "Hora nadlanim' (Real Estate Agent's Hora) was also translated into English and released as "Money Trees Forever".

=== Eurovision and breakup: 2007-2009 ===
On 7 January 2007, Teapacks were internally selected by IBA's Eurovision Committee to represent Israel in the Eurovision Song Contest held in Helsinki, Finland. On 27 February 2007, Teapacks performed four songs, "Push the Button", "Salam Salami", "12 Points" and "Voulez Vous", in a TV special. "Push the Button" was chosen as the Israeli entry for the 2007 Eurovision Contest by popular vote.

The band performed "Push the Button" at the Eurovision Semi Finals on 10 May 2007, but it failed to qualify for the finals. The song was controversial because of references to Iran and nuclear war.

Teapacks officially disbanded on 1 January 2009. In an interview with Mako on 10 November 2008, Oz stated that the three constant members (himself, Yosifov and Peremen) had become tired of working together. During their breakup, Oz released two solo albums, Mizmorei nevochim (Psalms for the Perplexed) and Mizmorim nosafim (More Psalms), while Yosifov concentrated on teaching guitar and collaborated with Moran Cohen-Talmor on several albums.

=== Reunion: 2014-present ===
In 2014, Teapacks reformed and began to tour. Their latest album, Avodat kapayim (Manual Labour), was released in September 2016, preceded by the singles "Mi haprovintsial" (What's With the Provincial), "Tsemed ayalot" (Two Deer), "Layla layla tov (Good Night, Good Night), "Avodat kapayim" and "Lo haya lano klum" (We Had Nothing). Yemini also returned to Teapacks, but during his time away from them, he had become an Orthodox Jew. Due to this, when the video to "Mi haprovintzial" was filmed in February 2016, he was replaced with Motti Yosef. Oz explained in an interview with Israel Hayom the rabbinical hoops the band had to jump through to keep performing with Yemini. The live show since 2014 features a PowerPoint presentation with the lyrics running behind the band, synced with the songs. This is a habit Oz brought to the group from his solo work - new band members Adam Mader (mandolin), Sefi Hirsch (violin), Shachar Yampolsky (keyboards, acoustic guitar), Danielle Krief (backing vocals) and Noam Chen (percussion) all played in Oz' solo band and joined Teapacks in 2014.

A website called ooooiiii.com, featuring the chorus of "Harabi Joe Capara" on a loop, was created in 2006 and became popular in 2011 after being featured on Vsauce.

In 2019, the band announced that they would release only singles instead of working on albums, and released the song "BBBBBB" on 19 August that year. A song called "Dachlilim" was also released on 9 June 2020, which dates back to the band's reunion in 2013 but had not been recorded.

The band had been working on an album prior to 7 October 2023, at which point they embarked on a tour playing for refugees and soldiers around Israel. On 22 August 2024, the album was announced as Shawarma Beach. The band had also previously released Shachachnu eich lachlom, a compilation of non-album singles released between 2018 and 2024, on 21 July. Shawarma Beach was released on 20 September, and featured 11 new songs, plus "Croque Madame Croque Monsieur", a song from the band's 2007 Eurovision promo CD.

== Discography ==
=== Studio albums ===
- Shvil Klipot Hagarinim (The Path of Sunflower Seeds) - 1992
- Ha'acharon Ba'asiron Hatachton (The Last of the Lower Class) - 1993
- Hachaim Shelcha Be'laffa (Your Life in a Laffa) - 1995
- Klavim Lo Novchim Beyarok (Dogs Don't Bark In Green) - 1996 (Motion Picture Soundtrack)
- Neshika Ladod (A Kiss to the Uncle) - 1997
- Disco Menayak (Disco Jerk; this word is also a derogatory slang for a Police officer) - 1999
- Yoshvim Beveit Caffe (Sitting in a Coffee Shop) - 2001
- Radio Musica Ivrit (Radio Hebrew Music) - 2006
- Avodat Kapayim (Manual Labour) - 2016
- Shawarma Beach - 2024

=== Compilations ===
- Kol Halehitim (Hit Collection) - 2003
- Haosef Haromanti (Romantic Collection) - 2010
- Shirim Nosafim (More Songs) - 2016
- Shachachnu Eich Lachlom (We Forgot How to Dream) - 2024

=== Singles ===
- Silonim - 1988
- Lispor kvasim - 1989
- Harabi Joe Capara - 1992
- Ani ohev otech - 1992
- Rikud ha-Pasadoble - 1992
- Im yipol gorale - 1993
- Hadoar ba hayom - 1993
- Em ve achot - 1993
- Shir ha-PAZAM - 1993
- Betoch niyar iton - 1994
- Zmanim ktanim - 1994
- Ma asit? - 1995
- Yesh li chavera - 1995
- Vehapam shir ahava - 1995
- Gever romanti - 1996
- Eize olam - 1997
- Lama halacht mimenu feat. Sarit Hadad - 1997
- Stam - 1997
- Sami ve Somo - 1999
- Shalosh balayla - 1999
- Kshani eitcha ani kemo dag - 2000
- Yoshvim bebeit kafe - 2001
- Kmo lifnei esrim shana - 2001
- Avaryan tzatzua - 2002
- Rikudei amba - 2003
- Hayamim haacharim - 2003
- Kol yom ani kimaat - 2003
- Sof hashavua mesiba - 2005
- Ten li chatima - 2006
- Kluv shel zahav - 2006
- Hora nadlanim - 2006
- Push the Button - 2007
- Mi haprovintzial - 2016
- Tsemed aylot - 2016
- Layla layla tov - 2016
- Ma iti? - 2016
- Avodat kapayim - 2016
- Lo haya lano klum - 2016

=== Music videos ===
- Ani rotze leshachpel otach (Svika Pick cover)
- Harabi Joe Capara (early demo from 1991)
- Harabi Joe Capara
- Yaron Zehavi beshvil klipot hagarinim
- Hadoar ba hayom
- Shir belachatz
- Betoch niyar iton
- Anana
- Shir ha-PAZAM
- Ma asit?
- Yesh li chavera
- Vehapam shir ahava
- Hachaim shelcha belafa
- Eize olam
- Od shabat
- Lama halacht mimenu
- Stam
- Sami ve Somo
- Shifchat hazorem
- Yoshvim bebeit kafe
- Kmo lifnei esrim shana
- Veat veat veat
- Ilu hayit
- Rikudei amba
- Kol yom ani kimaat
- Kluv shel zahav
- Hora nadlanim
- Ten li chatima
- Push the Button
- Mi haprovintsial
- Layla layla tov (lyric video)
- Ma iti?
- Avodat kapayim
- #BBBBBB (with BEMET)

== Band members ==
=== Current lineup ===
- Kobi Oz - lead vocals (1988–present), keyboards (1988-1990)
- Ram Yosifov - guitar, mandolin, backing vocals (1989-1990, 1991–present)
- Gal Peremen - bass, backing vocals (1988–present)
- Moti Joseph - drums (1998-2000, 2002-2009, 2021-present)
- Shahar Yampolsky - keyboards, accordion, acoustic guitar (2014–present)
- Shani Izhari - female lead vocals, backing vocals (2023–present)
- Adam Mader - whistle, trumpet, mandolin, violin, backing vocals (2014–present)

=== Former members ===
- Einav Cohen - guitar (1988-1989, 1990)
- Yoav Nagar - drums (1989-1991)
- Avinoam Marton - drums (1991-1993)
- Ronit Shefi - accordion, keyboards, backing vocals (1993-1994)
- Sharon Ben Zadok - backing vocals, tambourine, dancing (1994-1996)
- Danielle Krief - female lead vocals, backing vocals (2014–2022)
- Uri Miles - accordion (1995-1998)
- Nuriel Amar - violin (1995-1998)
- Dani Aberjel - guitar (1998-2009)
- Tamir Yemini - drums, backing vocals (1988-1989, 1993-1997, 2001–2002, 2014–2020)
- Noam Yankelevich - keyboards (1998-2009)
- Meir Amar - DJ, sound effects, samples, backing vocals (1998-2009)
- Sefi Asfuri Hirsch - violin, accordion (2014–2020)
- Noam Chen - drums (2014–2020)

Awards and achievements
Preceded by Eddie Butler with Together We Are One	Israel in the Eurovision Song Contest; 2007	Succeeded by Boaz with The Fire in Your Eyes
