= Israel in the Eurovision Song Contest 2006 =

- Eurovision Song Contest 2006
- Participating broadcaster: Israel Broadcasting Authority (IBA)
- Country: Israel
- Selection process: Kdam Eurovision 2006
- Selection date: 15 March 2006

Competing entry
- Song: "Together We Are One"
- Artist: Eddie Butler
- Songwriters: Orly Burg; Osnat Zabag; Eddie Butler

Placement
- Final result: 23rd, 4 points

Participation chronology

Israel was represented at the Eurovision Song Contest 2006 with the song "Together We Are One", composed by Eddie Butler, with lyrics by Orly Burg and Osnat Zabag, and performed by Butler himself. The Israeli participating broadcaster, the Israel Broadcasting Authority (IBA), selected its entry through the national final Kdam Eurovision 2006. The competition took place on 15 March 2006 and featured eleven entries. "Ze Hazman" (זה הזמן) performed by Eddie Butler emerged as the winner after achieving the highest score following the combination of votes from four regional juries and a public vote. The song title was later translated from Hebrew to English for Eurovision and was titled "Together We Are One". Butler had represented Israel in 1999 as part of the band Eden.

As one of the ten highest placed finishers in the 2005 contest, Israel automatically qualified to compete in the final of the Eurovision Song Contest. Performing in position 3, Israel placed twenty-third out of the 24 participating countries with 4 points.

== Background ==
Prior to the 2006 Contest, the Israel Broadcasting Authority (IBA) had participated in the Eurovision Song Contest representing Israel twenty-eight times since its first entry in 1973. It has won the contest on three occasions: in 1978 with the song "A-Ba-Ni-Bi" by Izhar Cohen and the Alphabeta, in 1979 with the song "Hallelujah" by Milk and Honey, in 1998 with the song "Diva" by Dana International. Since the introduction of semi-finals to the format of the Eurovision Song Contest in 2004, Israel has, to this point, managed to qualify to the final one time, including a top ten result in 2005 with "HaSheket SheNish'ar" performed by Shiri Maimon placing fourth.

As part of its duties as participating broadcaster, IBA organises the selection of its entry in the Eurovision Song Contest and broadcasts the event in the country. The broadcaster confirmed its participation in the 2006 contest on 5 December 2005. IBA selected its 2005 entry through a national final with several entries, a selection procedure that continued to select its entry for 2006.

== Before Eurovision ==
=== Kdam Eurovision 2006 ===
Kdam Eurovision 2006 was the national final format organised by IBA to select its entry for the Eurovision Song Contest 2006. The competition took place on 15 March 2006 at the Nakdi TV Studios in Jerusalem, hosted by Yael Bar Zohar and Eden Harel and was broadcast on Channel 1, via radio on Reshet Gimmel as well as online via IBA's official Eurovision Song Contest website Eurovil. The national final was watched by 246,000 viewers in Israel with a market share of 14.2%.

==== Competing entries ====
Thirteen artists were nominated by a professional committee with members from IBA and Network C to participate in the competition. The members of the committee were Yossi Meshulam, Izchak Sonnenschein, Amnon Shiloni, Menachem Granit, Nava Achiron, Noam Gil-Or and Yigal Ben David. The competing acts were announced on 15 December 2005 and among the artists was Eddie Butler who previously represented Israel in 1999 as part of the group Eden. Avi Greinik, Gabi Shushan, Maya Bouskilla, Rama Messinger, and Uzi Fux with Cheri were later withdrawn from the competition and replaced with Avi Peretz, Svika Pick, and Tzipi Mash'hid. The competing songs were presented prior to the competition during the Reshet Gimmel radio programme Aharon Ferera on 5 March 2006.

Artist	Song	Songwriter(s)
Avi Peretz	"Bo'u Nirkod" (בואו ונרקוד)	Avi Peretz, Adi Leon
Aviva and Maya Avidan	"Yalda Sheli" (ילדה שלי)	Maya Avidan
Diamondz	"Ata Hakochav" (אתה הכוכב)	Liat Ravner, Eytan Elbaz
Eddie Butler	"Ze Hazman" (זה הזמן)	Orly Burg, Osnat Zabag, Eddie Butler
GameBoys	"Kama Ahava" (כמה אהבה)	Maayan Catz
Guy Harari	"Tnu La'ahava" (תנו לאהבה)	Guy Harari, Henry Bratter
Michael Kirkilan	"Nishbar Im Haru'ach" (נשבר עם הרוח)	Gil Skope
Shlomo Gronich, Lubna Salame and Michal Adler	"Ima Adama" (אמא אדמה)	Oshrat Ley-Papir, Shlomo Gronich
Svika Pick	"Lifney She'nifradim" (לפני שנפרדים)	Mirit Shem-Or, Svika Pick
Stalos and Oren Chen	"Chalom Orientali" (חלום אוריינטלי)	Yossi Gispan, Simon Buskilla
Tzipi Mash'hid	"Tzipor Ha'stav" (ציפור הסתיו)	Roy Aloni

==== Final ====
The final took place on 15 March 2006. The winner, "Ze Hazman" performed by Eddie Butler, was selected by a combination of the votes from four regional juries and a public vote conducted through regional televoting, SMS voting and the studio audience. In addition to the performances of the competing entries, the interval acts featured Shiri Maimon (who represented Israel in 2005) performed her newest song "Le'an Shelo Telhi", and all competing artists performing a medley of former Israeli Eurovision or Kdam Eurovision songs written by Ehud Manor who died in 2005.

Final – 15 March 2006
R/O	Artist	Song	Jury	Public	Total	Place
1	Shlomo Gronich, Lubna Salame and Michal Adler	"Ima Adama"	5	35	40	6
2	Aviva and Maya Avidan	"Yalda Sheli"	21	9	30	8
3	Avi Peretz	"Bo'u Nirkod"	4	15	19	11
4	GameBoys	"Kama Ahava"	33	45	78	3
5	Stalos and Oren Chen	"Chalom Orientali"	5	24	29	9
6	Guy Harari	"Tnu La'ahava"	10	18	28	10
7	Eddie Butler	"Ze Hazman"	43	56	99	1
8	Tzipi Mash'hid	"Tzipor Ha'stav"	24	14	38	7
9	Svika Pick	"Lifney She'nifradim"	29	42	71	4
10	Michael Kirkilan	"Nishbar Im Haru'ach"	33	35	68	5
11	Diamondz	"Ata Hakochav"	25	55	80	2

Detailed Regional Jury Votes
R/O	Song	Jerusalem	Haifa	Beersheba	Tel Aviv	Total
1	"Ima Adama"			3	2	5
2	"Yalda Sheli"	5	4	4	8	21
3	"Bo'u Nirkod"	3	1			4
4	"Kama Ahava"	12	6	8	7	33
5	"Chalom Orientali"	1	2	1	1	5
6	"Tnu La'ahava"	2	3	2	3	10
7	"Ze Hazman"	7	12	12	12	43
8	"Tzipor Ha'stav"	6	8	6	4	24
9	"Lifney She'nifradim"	4	10	5	10	29
10	"Nishbar Im Haru'ach"	10	7	10	6	33
11	"Ata Hakochav"	8	5	7	5	25
Regional Jury Spokespersons
Jerusalem – Sharon Vexler; Haifa – Yifat Amiel; Beersheba – Asaf Raz; Tel Aviv – Amit Dekel

Detailed Public Voting Results
R/O	Song	Televoting Regions				SMS	Audience	Total
R/O	Song	Central	Jerusalem	South	North	SMS	Audience	Total
1	"Ima Adama"	5	4	10	4	5	7	35
2	"Yalda Sheli"		3		2	2	2	9
3	"Bo'u Nirkod"	2	6	1	1		5	15
4	"Kama Ahava"	7		12	10	12	4	45
5	"Chalom Orientali"	6	5	4		1	8	24
6	"Tnu La'ahava"	4	2	3	6	3		18
7	"Ze Hazman"	10	12	8	8	8	10	56
8	"Tzipor Ha'stav"	1	1	2	5	4	1	14
9	"Lifney She'nifradim"	12	7	7	7	6	3	42
10	"Nishbar Im Haru'ach"	3	10	6	3	7	6	35
11	"Ata Hakochav"	8	8	5	12	10	12	55

== At Eurovision ==
According to Eurovision rules, all nations with the exceptions of the host country, the "Big Four" (France, Germany, Spain and the United Kingdom) and the ten highest placed finishers in the 2005 contest are required to qualify from the semi-final in order to compete for the final; the top ten countries from the semi-final progress to the final. As one of the ten highest placed finishers in the 2005 contest, Israel automatically qualified to compete in the final on 20 May 2006. In addition to their participation in the final, Israel is also required to broadcast and vote in the semi-final on 18 May 2006. On 21 March 2006, an allocation draw was held which determined the running order and Israel was set to perform in position 3 during the final, following the entry from Moldova and before the entry from Latvia. Israel placed twenty-third in the final, scoring 4 points.

In Israel, both the semi-final and the final were televised live on Channel 1. IBA appointed Dana Herman as its spokesperson to announce the Israeli votes during the final.

=== Voting ===
Below is a breakdown of points awarded to Israel and awarded by Israel in the semi-final and grand final of the contest. The nation awarded its 12 points to Russia in the semi-final and the final of the contest.

==== Points awarded to Israel ====
Points awarded to Israel (Final)
Score	Country
12 points	
10 points	
8 points	
7 points	
6 points	
5 points	
4 points	France
3 points	
2 points	
1 point	

==== Points awarded by Israel ====
Points awarded by Israel (Semi-final)
Score	Country
12 points	Russia
10 points	Armenia
8 points	Ukraine
7 points	Finland
6 points	Sweden
5 points	Ireland
4 points	Slovenia
3 points	Turkey
2 points	Poland
1 point	Bosnia and Herzegovina

Points awarded by Israel (Final)
Score	Country
12 points	Russia
10 points	Romania
8 points	Armenia
7 points	Finland
6 points	Ukraine
5 points	Sweden
4 points	Switzerland
3 points	Lithuania
2 points	Bosnia and Herzegovina
1 point	Turkey
