= Kobi Oz =

Israeli musical artist

Kobi Oz קובי אוז
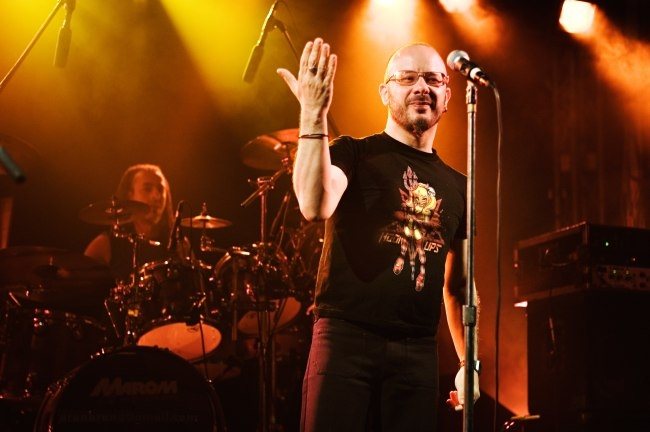
- Oz on stage with Teapacks in 2006

Background information
- Born: Yaakov Uzan; 17 September 1969 (age 56)
- Origin: Sderot, Israel
- Genres: Alternative rock, mizrahi, pop rock
- Occupations: Singer, songwriter, keyboardist
- Instruments: Vocals, keyboards
- Years active: 1985–present
- Labels: Hed-Arzi, Anana

Kobi Oz (Hebrew: קובי אוז, [ˈkobi ˈoz], born Ya'akov Uzan (Hebrew: יעקב אוזן, [ja.aˈkov uˈzan]) on 17 September 1969) is the lead singer of Israeli group Teapacks.

== Biography ==
Yaakov Uzan was born on January 1st 1966 in Sderot to Tunisian Jewish parents who moved to the British Mandate of Palestine in 1942 to escape the pro-Nazi Vichy France regime.

In 1985, Uzan adopted the stage name Kobi Oz and began playing music and composing. He started out playing keyboards for the band Sfatayim, which performed traditional Moroccan music.

In 1988, Oz released two solo singles, "Silonim" (Jets) and "Lispor kvasim" (Counting Sheep), which didn't get much traction. "Lispor kvasim" would be revisited in 1992 for Teapacks' debut album, Shvil klipot hagarinim. Two years later, he formed Teapacks with guitarist Einav Cohen, bassist Gal Peremen and drummer Tamir Yemini. Despite many lineup changes, Oz and Peremen remain in the band to this day.

Footage of Oz' time in Sfatayim was used in the music video to the Teapacks song "Avodat kapayim" (Manual Labour) in 2016. The song itself tells the story of Oz's involvement in Sfatayim. This is not the first time Oz has used footage from his teenage years in a music video: the song "Elohai" (God), released in 2010, used footage from Oz's Bar Mitzvah as a music video, as well as sampling an old recording of his grandfather singing. The song "Lo haya lano klum" (We Had Nothing) tells the story of the exodus of the Mizrahi Jews from their native countries, and the video features Oz' mother Rachel Uzan.

Oz is the author of two books: Petty Hoodlum (2002) and Moshe Chuato and the Raven (1996). He organized a demonstration in 2007 to raise public awareness of the tragedy of his home town, which is constantly under missile attack from the Gaza Strip. About 40,000 people came to Rabin Square in Tel Aviv to show solidarity with the inhabitants of Sderot. In 2010, Oz released his second solo album, Mizmorey Nevochim (Psalms for the Perplexed).

In 2009 Oz was honored as one of the torchbearers in the national Israeli Independence Day ceremony.

== Discography ==
- Silonim (Jets), 1988
- Lispor kvasim (Counting Sheep), 1988
- D'ma'ot veYam (Ocean and Tears), 2004
- Mizmorey Nevochim (Psalms for the Perplexed), 2010
- Mizmorim Nosafim (Some More Psalms), 2011

== Bibliography ==
- Moshe Chuvato ve ha-orev (1996)
- Avaryan tzaatzua (2002)
