= Lithuania in the Eurovision Song Contest 2006 =

- Eurovision Song Contest 2006
- Participating broadcaster: Lietuvos radijas ir televizija (LRT)
- Country: Lithuania
- Selection process: "Eurovizijos" dainų konkurso nacionalinė atranka
- Selection date: 4 March 2006

Competing entry
- Song: "We Are the Winners"
- Artist: LT United
- Songwriters: Andrius Mamontovas; Saulius Urbonavičius; Viktoras Diawara

Placement
- Semi-final result: Qualified (5th, 163 points)
- Final result: 6th, 162 points

Participation chronology

Lithuania was represented at the Eurovision Song Contest 2006 with the song "We Are the Winners", written by Andrius Mamontovas, Saulius Urbonavičius, and Viktoras Diawara, and performed by the group LT United. The Lithuanian participating broadcaster, Lietuvos radijas ir televizija (LRT), organised the national final "Eurovizijos" dainų konkurso nacionalinė atranka in order to select its entry for the contest. The national final took place over eight weeks and involved 49 artists competing in two different competitive streams: newcomers and established artists. In the final, 16 entries remained and a public vote entirely selected "We Are the Winners" performed by LT United as the winner with 32,669 votes. Songwriter and group member Viktoras Diawara represented Lithuania in 2001 as part of the group SKAMP.

Lithuania competed in the semi-final of the Eurovision Song Contest which took place on 18 May 2006. Performing during the show in position 18, "We Are the Winners" was announced among the top 10 entries of the semi-final and therefore qualified to compete in the final on 20 May. This marked the first qualification to the final for Lithuania since the introduction of semi-finals in 2004. It was later revealed that Lithuania placed fifth out of the 23 participating countries in the semi-final with 163 points. In the final, Lithuania performed in position 14 and placed sixth out of the 24 participating countries, scoring 162 points.

== Background ==
Prior to the 2006 contest, Lietuvos radijas ir televizija (LRT) had participated in the Eurovision Song Contest representing Lithuania six times since its first entry in 1994. Its best placing in the contest was thirteenth, achieved in 2001 with the song "You Got Style" performed by Skamp. Following the introduction of semi-finals for the 2004, Lithuania, to this point, had never managed to qualify to the final. In 2005, "Little by Little" performed by Laura and the Lovers failed to qualify to the final.

As part of its duties as participating broadcaster, LRT organises the selection of its entry in the Eurovision Song Contest and broadcasts the event in the country. Other than the internal selection of its debut entry in 1994, the broadcaster has selected its entry consistently through a national final procedure. LRT confirmed its intentions to participate at the 2006 contest on 5 October 2005 and announced the organization of "Eurovizijos" dainų konkurso nacionalinė atranka, which would be the national final to select its entry for the contest.

== Before Eurovision ==
=== "Eurovizijos" dainų konkurso nacionalinė atranka ===
"Eurovizijos" dainų konkurso nacionalinė atranka (Eurovision Song Contest national selection) was the national final format developed by LRT in order to select its entry for the Eurovision Song Contest 2006. The competition involved an eight-week-long process that commenced on 14 January 2006 and concluded with a winning song and artist on 4 March 2006. The eight shows took place were hosted by Jurga Šeduikytė and Rolandas Vilkončius and were broadcast on LTV and LTV2 as well as online via the broadcaster's website lrt.lt.

==== Format ====
The Lithuanian broadcaster overhauled the format of the national final from that of previous years. For the 2006 competition, entries initially competed in two different subgroups: newcomers, and established artists with more than one year of active stage experience or that had participated in the Lithuanian national final for at least two years. Entries from newcomers were higher in number (28) and therefore three heats consisting of eight or 10 entries each were held during the programme Lietuvos dainų dešimtukas, resulting in the top four from each show advancing in the competition. The remaining 12 entries participated in the fourth show on 4 February, where half of the entries were eliminated, leaving six entries remaining in the group. The fifth to seventh shows were the competition's semi-finals, where the established artists and the remaining six newcomers participated together for the first time. Nine entries participated in each of the first two semi-finals and the top five proceeded to the final, while seven entries participated in the third semi-final and the top four proceeded to the final. LRT also selected two wildcard acts for the final out of the remaining non-qualifying acts from the semi-finals. In the final, the winner was selected from the remaining 16 entries.

The results of the newcomers selection were determined by the 50/50 combination of votes from a jury panel consisting of three to five members and public televoting. The ranking developed by both streams of voting was converted to points from 1-8, 10 and 12 and assigned based on the number of competing songs in the respective show. In the semi-finals and the final, the results were determined solely by public televoting. The public could vote through telephone and SMS voting.

==== Competing entries ====
LRT opened a submission period on 5 October 2005 for artists and songwriters to submit their entries with the deadline on 11 December 2005. On 13 January 2006, LRT announced the 52 entries selected for the competition from 72 submissions received. Among the artists was previous Lithuanian Eurovision contestant Viktoras Diawara (member of LT United), who represented Lithuania in 2001 as part of Skamp. The final changes to the list of 52 competing acts were later made with the withdrawal of five songs: "Daydreaming" performed by Eleonora Sobrova, and "Remember" performed by Helada from the newcomers group, as well as "Day or Night" performed by Amberlife, "Escape We Tonight" performed by Mantas, and "Už lango šventė" performed by Egidijus Sipavičius from the established artists group.

Artist	Song	Songwriter(s)
4Fun	"Kitą dieną"	Julija Ritčik
Aistė Pilvelytė	"Just for Fun"	Rafael Artesero
Alanas Chošnau	"The Heat"	Eric L., Slavic L. Gravity, Alanas Chošnau
Aliukai	"Madona"	Nejolė Laukavičienė, Evaldas Melnikas
Antanas Nedzinskas	"Pop žvaigždė"	Aleksandras Makejevas
Artas	"Wonder Who Loves You"	Artūras Pitkauskas
Ashtrey	"Window to the World"	Ashtrey, Rita Naujokaitytė
Augustė	"Make Me Wanna Lose You"	Augustė Vedrickaitė
B'Avarija	"If My Dream Came True"	Deivydas Zvonkus, Juozas Liesis
Banglai	"I'm So Happy"	Unknown
Bugs Band	"Pajūrio samba"	Ričardas Runča
C–Stones and Favour	"Flirtin' on the Dance Floor"	Mads BB Krog
Colder	"Halo"	Vaidotas Valančius
Dove	"4 Ever"	Paulius Jasiūnas, U. Vaitiekus
Dovilė	"The Way to You"	Alvidas Kavaliauskas, Rūta Lukoševičiūtė
Edmundas Kučinskas	"Tavo ir mano dalia"	Edmundas Kučinskas, Paulius Stalionis
Eduardo Gimenez	"Geografias"	Eduardo Gimenez
Eglė Juodytė	"Not Good to Be Mad"	Eglė Juodytė
Eleonora Sobrova	"Daydreaming"	Unknown
Evelina Jocytė	"Take Me"	Unknown
Evelina Škėmaitė	"Let Me Be Your Star"	Unknown
Fate	"Baby You Are"	Tadas Čipsas, Ludvikas Čipsas
Flaer	"Iš lempos"	Adomas Stančikas
Giulija	"Grafiti"	Aras Žvirblis, Olegas Zotovas
Gravel	"Round and Round"	Tomas Sinickis, Miroslav Sinickis
Helada	"Remember"	Unknown
Highway	"It's a Longest Way"	Seržas Fino, Romanas Njejelovas
Hola	"All I Need"	Unknown
InCulto	"Welcome to Lithuania"	InCulto
Intro's	"Girl You Know"	Unknown
Jonas Čepulis	"I Don't Think"	Jonas Čepulis, Aurelijus Sirgedas
LT United	"We Are the Winners"	Andrius Mamontovas, Saulius Urbonavičius, Viktoras Diawara
Margarita Arta	"Thoughts"	Margarita Arta
Milana	"Eternal Love"	Unknown
N.E.O.	"Alright"	Raigardas Tautkus
Nacija and Rasa Juzukonytė	"Pavasario lietus"	Aurelijus Globys
Natas	"Jūros liga"	Aurelijus Sirgedas
Nerri	"Again"	Neringa Žiliūtė
Onsa	"Time to Change"	Tautrimas Rupulevičius
Robertas Kupstas	"Falling in Love"	Stefano Ganopoulos
Rugiagėlių Berniukai	"Turn Around"	Haroldas Šlikas
Rūta Lukoševičiūtė	"Lithuanian Boy"	Stefano Ganopoulos
Saulės kliošas	"Back to the Future"	Saulės kliošas
Sėkmė	"Funny"	Unknown
Sinir Yok	"Give Me Your Heart"	Monika Miniotaitė, Oskars Vorobjovas-Pinta
Stringaj	"Cockroach Love"	Vilius Tamošaitis, Tadas Majeris
Super Kolegos	"Song About Love"	Mindaugas Dirda
The Road Band	"I Feel So Free"	Alexander Belkin, Julija Ritčik
Tribute	"Lifestyle"	Unknown

==== Jury members (Newcomers selection) ====
Jury members by newcomers selection show
Jury member	Semi-finals			Final	Occupation(s)
Jury member	1	2	3	Final	Occupation(s)
Algirdas Kaušpėdas	No	No	No	Yes	lead singer of the group Antis
Arina Borunova	No	No	Yes	No	singer
Arminas Višinskis	No	No	Yes	No	journalist
Artūras Orlauskas	No	Yes	No	Yes	television presenter
Edmundas Žalpys	No	No	Yes	No	music event organiser
Janina Miščiukaitė	No	Yes	No	No	singer
Jonas Jučas	No	No	No	Yes	organiser of the Kaunas Jazz festival
Jurijus Smoriginas	No	Yes	No	No	choreographer
Povilas Meškėla	Yes	No	No	No	lead singer of the group Rojaus tūzai
Rima Dirsytė-Zeip	Yes	No	No	No	singer
Stepas Januška	No	No	No	Yes	singer
Vilhelmas Čepinskis	No	No	No	Yes	musician
Viktoras Malinauskas	No	No	Yes	No	singer
Vytautas Juozapavičius	Yes	No	No	No	producer

==== Newcomers selection ====
The newcomers selection of the competition aired from the LRT studios in Vilnius between 14 January and 4 February 2006. The three semi-finals featured the 28 entries from the newcomers and the top four advanced to the newcomers final from each semi-final; the bottom entries were eliminated.

Two acts that were scheduled to perform in the first semi-final didn't appear; Eleonora Sobrova with "Daydreamer" was disqualified for not showing up, whilst Robertas Kupstas with "Falling In Love" was sick, so his performance was moved to the newcomers semi-final 2. In the second heat, Helada with "Remember" was involved in a car accident, forcing her to withdraw from the competition.

Key

Qualified Rescheduled Disqualified/Withdrew

Newcomers semi-final 1 – 14 January 2006
R/O	Artist	Song	Jury	Televote		Total	Place
R/O	Artist	Song	Jury	Votes	Points	Total	Place
1	Eglė Juodytė	"Not Good to Be Mad"	10	142	4	14	3
2	Eleonora Sobrova	"Daydreaming"	—	—	—	—	—
3	Augustė	"Make Me Wanna Lose You"	12	984	12	24	1
4	Robertas Kupstas	"Falling In Love"	—	—	—	—	—
5	Antanas Nedzinskas	"Pop žvaigždė"	4	442	10	14	3
6	Margarita Arta	"Thoughts"	3	15	3	6	8
7	Jonas Čepulis	"I Don't Think"	8	225	8	16	2
8	Hola	"All I Need"	5	183	7	12	6
9	Fate	"Baby You Are"	6	159	5	11	7
10	Evelina Jocytė	"Take Me"	7	166	6	13	5
11	Non-existent act		—	47	—	—	—

Newcomers semi-final 2 – 21 January 2006
R/O	Artist	Song	Jury	Televote		Total	Place
R/O	Artist	Song	Jury	Votes	Points	Total	Place
1	Colder	"Halo"	10	125	2	12	4
2	Robertas Kupstas	"Falling in Love"	8	895	12	20	1
3	Milana	"Eternal Love"	7	259	4	11	5
4	Dove	"4 Ever"	12	533	8	20	1
5	Gravel	"Round and Round"	5	619	10	15	3
6	Sėkmė	"Funny"	6	98	1	7	8
7	Super Kolegos	"Song About Love"	4	339	7	11	5
8	Flaer	"Iš lempos"	2	272	5	7	8
9	Sinir Yok	"Give Me Your Heart"	1	183	3	4	10
10	Evelina Škėmaitė	"Let Me Be Your Star"	3	287	6	9	7
—	Helada	"Remember"	—	—	—	—	—

Newcomers semi-final 3 – 28 January 2006
R/O	Artist	Song	Jury	Televote		Total	Place
R/O	Artist	Song	Jury	Votes	Points	Total	Place
1	Intro's	"Girl You Know"	6	654	10	16	3
2	Stringaj	"Cockroach Love"	4	237	5	9	7
3	Ashtrey	"Window to the World"	10	313	7	17	2
4	Rugiagėlių Berniukai	"Turn Around"	2	108	2	4	8
5	Tribute	"Lifestyle"	3	92	1	4	8
6	Onsa	"Time to Change"	8	346	8	16	3
7	Nerri	"Again"	7	133	4	11	5
8	Banglai	"I'm So Happy"	1	133	3	4	8
9	Natas	"Jūros liga"	5	271	6	11	5
10	Dovilė	"The Way to You"	12	1,949	12	24	1

Newcomers final – 4 February 2006
R/O	Artist	Song	Jury	Televote		Total	Place
R/O	Artist	Song	Jury	Votes	Points	Total	Place
1	Dovilė	"The Way to You"	10	1,111	8	18	2
2	Ashtrey	"Window to the World"	7	317	2	9	6
3	Colder	"Halo"	5	121	0	5	10
4	Intro's	"Girl You Know"	2	715	6	8	8
5	Antanas Nedzinskas	"Pop žvaigždė"	0	562	3	3	11
6	Dove	"4 Ever"	12	571	4	16	3
7	Jonas Čepulis	"I Don't Think"	1	230	0	1	12
8	Robertas Kupstas	"Falling in Love"	3	897	7	10	4
9	Eglė Juodytė	"Not Good to Be Mad"	6	261	1	7	9
10	Onsa	"Time to Change"	4	700	5	9	6
11	Augustė	"Make Me Wanna Lose You"	8	2,392	12	20	1
12	Gravel	"Round and Round"	0	1,408	10	10	4

==== Semi-finals ====
The three semi-finals of the competition aired from the LRT studios in Vilnius on 11, 18, and 25 February 2006 and featured both the established artists and entries that qualified from the newcomers selection. In each of the first two semi-finals, the top five advanced to the final, while the top four entries of the third semi-final advanced to the final; the bottom entries were eliminated. On 27 February 2006, LRT announced the two entries that had received a wildcard to also proceed to the final.

Key

Qualifier Wildcard qualifier

Semi-final 1 – 11 February 2006
R/O	Artist	Song	Televote	Place
1	Alanas Chošnau	"The Heat"	1,905	2
2	Dove	"4 Ever"	1,195	6
3	Gravel	"Round and Round"	2,246	1
4	Artas	"Wonder Who Loves You"	1,886	4
5	4Fun	"Kitą dieną"	83	9
6	Giulija	"Grafiti"	340	8
7	B'Avarija	"If My Dream Came True"	758	7
8	Saulės kliošas	"Back to the Future"	1,421	5
9	Edmundas Kučinskas	"Tavo ir mano dalia"	1,903	3

Semi-final 2 – 18 February 2006
R/O	Artist	Song	Televote	Place
1	Augustė	"Make Me Wanna Lose You"	1,367	3
2	The Road Band	"I Feel So Free"	137	8
3	Aliukai	"Madona"	386	6
4	C–Stones and Favour	"Flirtin' on the Dance Floor"	1,228	4
5	InCulto	"Welcome to Lithuania"	2,638	1
6	Robertas Kupstas	"Falling in Love"	1,682	2
7	Rūta Lukoševičiūtė	"Lithuanian Boy"	244	7
8	Nacija and Rasa Juzukonytė	"Pavasario lietus"	1,135	5
9	Highway	"It's a Longest Way"	108	9

Semi-final 3 – 25 February 2006
R/O	Artist	Song	Televote	Place
1	N.E.O.	"Alright"	898	3
2	Bugs Band	"Pajūrio samba"	117	7
3	Dovilė	"The Way to You"	605	5
4	Eduardo Gimenez	"Geografias"	174	6
5	Aistė Pilvelytė	"Just for Fun"	834	4
6	LT United	"We Are the Winners"	8,061	1
7	Onsa	"Time to Change"	1,143	2

==== Final ====
The final of the competition took place on 4 March 2006 at the Siemens Arena in Vilnius and featured the remaining 16 entries that qualified from the semi-finals. The final was the only show in the competition to be broadcast live; all other preceding shows were pre-recorded earlier in the week before their airdates. "We Are the Winners" performed by LT United was selected as the winner after gaining the most votes from the public. In addition to the performances of the competing entries, No Money, Žuvėdra, and Zdob și Zdub (who represented Moldova in 2005) performed as the interval acts.

Final – 4 March 2006
R/O	Artist	Song	Televote	Place
1	C–Stones and Favour	"Flirtin' on the Dance Floor"	1,689	11
2	Artas	"Wonder Who Loves You"	1,625	12
3	Robertas Kupstas	"Falling in Love"	2,681	8
4	Augustė	"Make Me Wanna Lose You"	1,959	10
5	B'Avarija	"If My Dream Came True"	765	15
6	InCulto	"Welcome to Lithuania"	16,451	2
7	Dove	"4 Ever"	1,361	13
8	Onsa	"Time to Change"	699	16
9	N.E.O.	"Alright"	2,735	7
10	Saulės kliošas	"Back to the Future"	1,084	14
11	Aistė Pilvelytė	"Just for Fun"	4,307	6
12	Nacija and Rasa Juzukonytė	"Pavasario lietus"	2,017	9
13	LT United	"We Are the Winners"	32,669	1
14	Alanas Chošnau	"The Heat"	9,249	3
15	Gravel	"Round and Round"	6,462	4
16	Edmundas Kučinskas	"Tavo ir mano dalia"	4,912	5

== At Eurovision ==
The Eurovision Song Contest 2006 took place at the Olympic Indoor Arena in Athens, Greece.

According to Eurovision rules, all nations with the exceptions of the host country, the "Big Four" (France, Germany, Spain and the United Kingdom) and the 10 highest placed finishers in the 2005 contest are required to qualify from the semi-final on 18 May 2006 in order to compete for the final on 20 May 2006; the top 10 countries from the semi-final progress to the final. On 21 March 2006, an allocation draw was held which determined the running order for the semi-final and Lithuania was set to perform in position 18, following the entry from the Netherlands and before the entry from Portugal.

At the end of the semi-final, Lithuania was announced as having finished in the top 10 and subsequently qualifying for the grand final. This marked the first qualification to the final for Lithuania since the introduction of semi-finals in 2004. It was later revealed that Lithuania placed fifth in the semi-final, receiving a total of 163 points. The draw for the running order for the final was done by the presenters during the announcement of the 10 qualifying countries during the semi-final and Lithuania was drawn to perform in position 14, following the entry from Bosnia and Herzegovina and before the entry from the United Kingdom. Lithuania placed sixth in the final, scoring 162 points. Despite achieving the nation's best result to date, the entry received mixed reactions and was one of the few Eurovision songs to get booed at the contest.

The semi-final and final were broadcast in Lithuania on LTV with commentary by Darius Užkuraitis. LRT appointed Lavija Šurnaitė as its spokesperson to announce the results of the Lithuanian televote during the final; 53,000 televotes were cast in Lithuania during the final.

=== Voting ===
Below is a breakdown of points awarded to Lithuania and awarded by Lithuania in the semi-final and grand final of the contest. The nation awarded its 12 points to Russia in the semi-final and the final of the contest.

==== Points awarded to Lithuania ====
Points awarded to Lithuania (Semi-final)
Score	Country
12 points	Ireland
10 points	Latvia; Poland; United Kingdom
8 points	Estonia; Finland; Iceland
7 points	Belgium
6 points	Belarus; Bulgaria; Moldova; Slovenia
5 points	Andorra; Croatia; Netherlands; Norway; Portugal; Ukraine
4 points	Cyprus; Denmark; Macedonia; Monaco; Russia; Sweden
3 points	Romania; Serbia and Montenegro
2 points	Bosnia and Herzegovina; Turkey
1 point	Germany; Greece

Points awarded to Lithuania (Final)
Score	Country
12 points	Ireland
10 points	Iceland; Latvia; United Kingdom
8 points	Estonia; Finland; Poland
7 points	Andorra; Denmark; Monaco
6 points	Belarus; Croatia; Netherlands
5 points	Norway; Russia; Ukraine
4 points	Belgium; Cyprus; Greece; Moldova; Portugal; Spain
3 points	Israel; Macedonia; Serbia and Montenegro; Slovenia; Sweden
2 points	
1 point	Bulgaria; Germany; Malta

==== Points awarded by Lithuania ====
Points awarded by Lithuania (Semi-final)
Score	Country
12 points	Russia
10 points	Finland
8 points	Poland
7 points	Iceland
6 points	Ukraine
5 points	Sweden
4 points	Ireland
3 points	Bosnia and Herzegovina
2 points	Belgium
1 point	Netherlands

Points awarded by Lithuania (Final)
Score	Country
12 points	Russia
10 points	Finland
8 points	Latvia
7 points	Ukraine
6 points	Ireland
5 points	Sweden
4 points	Bosnia and Herzegovina
3 points	Greece
2 points	Armenia
1 point	Romania
