= We Are the Winners =

2006 song by LT United

Single by LT United
- Released: 2006
- Length: 2:38
- Composers: Andrius Mamontovas; Saulius "Samas" Urbonavičius
- Lyricists: Andrius Mamontovas; Victor "Vee" Diawara

Eurovision Song Contest 2006 entry
- Country: Lithuania
- Languages: English, French

Finals performance
- Semi-final result: 5th
- Semi-final points: 163
- Final result: 6th
- Final points: 162

Entry chronology
- ◄ "Little by Little" (2005)
- "Love or Leave" (2007) ►

"We Are the Winners" is a song by Lithuanian all-star group LT United, consisting of Andrius Mamontovas, Marijonas Mikutavičius, Viktoras Diawara, Saulius Urbonavičius, Arnoldas Lukošius and Eimantas Belickas. It was the Lithuanian entry into the Eurovision Song Contest 2006.

== Composition ==
The song, thematically reminiscent of Queen's "We Are the Champions", is a cheery tongue-in-cheek celebration of their supposedly inevitable victory at the Eurovision Song Contest in the form of a football chant, with the chorus repeating "We are the winners of Eurovision / We are, we are! [...] So, you gotta vote, vote, vote for the winners!".

== Eurovision Song Contest ==
=== National final ===
Lithuania's entry for the 2006 contest was chosen in a national final held by Lithuanian broadcaster LRT. Before the final, four newcomer qualifying heats and three semi-finals were held to select the 16 finalists.

"We Are the Winners" skipped the newcomer qualifying heats and moved directly to the semi-finals. The song competed in the third semi-final on 25 February 2006. It was one of four qualifiers, earning first place in the semi-final by a wide margin.

The final was held on 4 March 2006, with the winner being decided by the way of televoting. The song won with 32,669 votes, over 16,000 more than second place. As a result, the song went on to represent Lithuania in the Eurovision Song Contest 2006.

=== At Eurovision ===
"We Are the Winners" was one of the few Eurovision songs to get booed. As Lithuania had not qualified for the final at the 2005 contest, the song was first performed in the semi-final. In the semi-final, it was performed 18th, following the Netherlands' Treble with "Amambanda" and preceding Portugal's Nonstop with "Coisas de nada". At the close of voting, it had received 163 points, placing 5th in the 23-strong field and qualifying Lithuania for the final.

In the final, the song was performed 14th, following Bosnia and Herzegovina's Hari Mata Hari with "Lejla" and preceding the United Kingdom's Daz Sampson with "Teenage Life". At the close of voting, it had received 162 points, placing 6th in a field of 24 and giving Lithuania an automatic final berth at the next contest. Its best points haul was from both the United Kingdom and from Ireland. At the after show press conference, winners Lordi sang the chorus of "We Are the Winners" as they entered. To date, the entry's final position of 6th is the highest-ranking entry for Lithuania in the Eurovision Song Contest.

== World Cup cover ==
Perhaps fittingly for a football chant-style song, LT United also recorded a version for the 2006 FIFA World Cup with slightly altered lyrics ("we are the winners / are you with us", for example). This recording appeared to be intended for any team to adopt, since Lithuania did not qualify for the finals of World Cup 2006. The refrain of the song was performed live by Robbie Williams during his show in King Baudouin Stadium, Brussels on June 13, 2006.

== Charts and reception ==
In Lithuania, "We Are the Winners" was released as a CD single on 7 June 2006 through the M.P.3 record label and became the fastest selling CD single in years. On 21 June, it was certified gold (passing 3000 units of CD sales) and on 1 August it was certified platinum (reaching 5000 units of CD sales). It became the first platinum single in Lithuania in four years.

Chart (2006)	Peak position
Finnish Singles Chart	14
