= Belgium in the Eurovision Song Contest 2006 =

- Eurovision Song Contest 2006
- Participating broadcaster: Vlaamse Radio- en Televisieomroeporganisatie (VRT)
- Country: Belgium
- Selection process: Eurosong '06
- Selection date: 19 February 2006

Competing entry
- Song: "Je t'adore"
- Artist: Kate Ryan
- Songwriters: Kate Ryan; Niklas Bergwall; Niclas Kings; Lisa Greene

Placement
- Semi-final result: Failed to qualify (12th)

Participation chronology

Belgium was represented at the Eurovision Song Contest 2006 with the song "Je t'adore", written by Kate Ryan, Niklas Bergwall, Niclas Kings, and Lisa Greene, and performed by Kate Ryan herself. The Belgian participating broadcaster, Flemish Vlaamse Radio- en Televisieomroeporganisatie (VRT), selected its entry for the contest through the national final Eurosong '06. The competition featured twenty-eight competing entries and consisted of seven shows. In the final on 19 February 2006, "Je t'adore" performed by Kate Ryan was selected as the winner via the votes of seven jury groups and a public televote.

Belgium competed in the semi-final of the Eurovision Song Contest which took place on 18 May 2006. Performing during the show in position 7, "Je t'adore" was not announced among the top 10 entries of the semi-final and therefore did not qualify to compete in the final. It was later revealed that Belgium placed twelfth out of the 23 participating countries in the semi-final with 69 points.

== Background ==
Prior to the 2006 contest, Belgium had participated in the Eurovision Song Contest forty-seven times since its debut as one of seven countries to take part in 1956. Since then, they have won the contest on one occasion in 1986 with the song "J'aime la vie", performed by Sandra Kim. Following the introduction of semi-finals for 2004, Belgium had been featured in only one final. In 2005, "Le grand soir" performed by Nuno Resende placed twenty-second in the semi-final and failing to advance to the final.

The Belgian participation in the contest alternates between two broadcasters: Flemish Vlaamse Radio- en Televisieomroeporganisatie (VRT) and Walloon Radio-télévision belge de la Communauté française (RTBF) at the time, with both broadcasters sharing the broadcasting rights. Both broadcasters –and their predecessors– had selected the Belgian entry using national finals and internal selections in the past. VRT in 2004 and RTBF in 2005 both organised a national final in order to select their entries. On 19 June 2005, VRT –who had the turn– confirmed its participation in the 2006 contest and announced that the Eurosong '06 national final would be held to select its entry.

== Before Eurovision ==
=== Eurosong '06 ===
The logo of Eurosong '06

Eurosong '06 was the national final organised by VRT to select its entry in the Eurovision Song Contest 2006. The competition consisted of seven shows that commenced on 8 January 2006 and concluded with a final on 19 February 2006 where the winning song and artist were selected. All shows took place at the Studio 100 in Schelle, hosted by Bart Peeters and were broadcast on Eén.

==== Format ====
Twenty-eight entries were selected to compete in Eurosong. Four heats took place on 8, 15, 22 and 29 January 2006 with each show featuring seven entries. The top three as determined by an expert jury, a press jury, two radio jury groups from the stations Radio 2 and Radio Donna and public televoting qualified to the semi-finals. The expert jury also selected two wildcards out of the non-qualifying acts in the heats to advance. The qualifying artists were then coached and groomed by a team of experts in further preparation for the national final. This team consisted of stylists Lien Degol and Jani Kazaltzis, choreographer Marvin Smith and advertiser Peter Ampe.

Two semi-finals took place on 5 and 12 February 2006 with each show featuring seven entries. The top three as determined by the four jury groups and public televoting qualified to the final, while the expert jury also selected a wildcard out of the non-qualifying acts in the semi-finals to advance. The final took place on 19 February 2006 where the winner was chosen by an expert jury, a press jury, two radio jury groups from the stations Radio 2 and Radio Donna, three international jury groups and public televoting. Each jury group had an equal stake in the result during all shows, while the public televote had a weighting equal to the votes of two jury groups in the heats and the semi-finals and three jury groups in the final. Each show was broadcast in two parts: in the first part, the songs were performed and the results of the expert jury were announced; after the first part an episode of Flikken and then an episode of Witse was aired while the rest of the results were being collected; and in the second part, the results of the public televoting and three other jury groups were announced.

During each of the seven shows, the expert jury provided commentary and feedback to the artists as well as selected entries to advance in the competition. The experts were:

- Yasmine – singer and television presenter
- Marcel Vanthilt – singer and television presenter
- André Vermeulen – Belgian commentator at the Eurovision Song Contest
- Johnny Logan – Irish singer-songwriter, who won Eurovision for Ireland in 1980 and in 1987

==== Competing entries ====
A submission period was opened on 19 June 2005 for artists and songwriters to submit their entries until 28 September 2005. The twenty-eight acts selected by VRT for the competition from 321 entries received during the submission period were announced on 6 December 2005. Among the competing artists were former Eurovision Song Contest participants Barbara Dex, who represented Belgium in 1993, and Vanessa Chinitor, who represented Belgium in 1999.

Artist	Song	Composer(s)
Afi	"Not That Beautiful"	Alain Vande Putte, Miguel Wiels
Ali vs. Laura	"I Belong to You Belong to Me"	Jamy Mahyar Bagheri
Axel Devries	"Alleen jij"	Ronald Vanhuffel, Tracy Atkins, Jurgen Coppieters
Barbara Dex	"Crazy"	Andre Remkes, Alidus Hidding
Beatoxic	"Feel Like"	Geert D'Haene
Belle Perez	"El mundo bailando"	Maribel Pérez, Juan Guerrero, Fernando De Meersman, Patrick Renier
Brahim	"P.O.W.E.R."	Fred Braikin, Brahim Attaeb, Jeremy Style
Casa Creola	"Easy esta noche"	Marc Paelinck, Jamie Winchester
Els de Schepper	"Als ik je morgen ergens tegenkom"	Rick Denys, David Poltrock
Eve Kempbell	"Not Right"	Paul Drew, Greig Watts, Peter Barringer, Phillipa Alexanda, Ellie Wyatt
Fantoom	"Hier sta ik"	Servaas Binge, Hillert Binge
Jeason	"Dame amor, dame vida"	Jeason Herfs
Kaden	"In Your Heaven"	Marc Van Hie, Rudolf Hecke
Kate Ryan	"Je t'adore"	Katrien Verbeeck, Niklas Bergwall, Niclas Kings, Lisa Greene
Katerine	"Watch Me Move"	Mark Frisch, Anthony Galatis, Yannik Fonderie
Kaye Styles	"Profile"	Youssef Chelak
La Sakhra	"Wonderland"	Vincent Pierins, Patrick Hamilton
Laura D	"History Turning Round"	Daniel Boquist, Marcus Englöf, Johan Bejerholm, Nick Woodbridge
Peter Evrard	"Coward"	Stefaan Fernande, Luca Chiaravelli
Pim	"I'm Your Man"	Alain Vande Putte, Serge Hertoge
Roxane	"Push It"	Mon S'Jegers
Sonny O'Brien	"I'll Be There for You"	Ben "Jammin" Robbins, Lenna Bauerly Shelly
Tommy	"The Best Time of My Life"	Tommy Vlaeminck
Triskèl	"I'll Be There for You"	Kurt Burgelman, Alain Van Zeveren
Valérie Mouton	"I Can't Go On Like This"	Sofie Verbruggen, Herve Martens
Vanessa Chinitor	"Beyond You"	Gerard James Borg, Philip Vella
WOEST	"Gek"	Tom Van Landuyt
Zenna	"Someone Is Calling"	Inge Moortgat, Violetta Zimbardi, Sammy Merayah

==== Heats ====
The four heats took place on 8, 15, 22 and 29 January 2006. In each show seven entries competed and the combination of results from an expert jury, a press jury, two radio jury groups and a public televote determined the top three that qualified to the semi-finals. An additional two entries were awarded wildcards by the expert jury from the remaining non-qualifying acts in the heats to proceed to the semi-finals.

Heat 1 – 8 January 2006
R/O	Artist	Song	Jury	Televote	Total	Place	Result
1	Brahim	"P.O.W.E.R."	30	14	44	2	Qualified
2	Jeason	"Dame amor, dame vida"	14	10	24	3	Qualified
3	Sonny O'Brien	"I'll Be There for You"	19	4	23	4	Wildcard
4	Fantoom	"Hier sta ik"	7	8	15	6	—N/a
5	Vanessa Chinitor	"Beyond You"	8	2	10	7	—N/a
6	Zenna	"Someone Is Calling"	12	6	18	5	—N/a
7	Katerine	"Watch Me Move"	34	18	52	1	Qualified

Detailed Jury Votes
R/O	Song	Expert Jury	Press Jury	Radio Juries		Total
R/O	Song	Expert Jury	Press Jury	Radio 2	Donna	Total
1	"P.O.W.E.R."	7	7	7	9	30
2	"Dame amor, dame vida"	5	2	3	4	14
3	"I'll Be There for You"	4	5	5	5	19
4	"Hier sta ik"	1	1	2	3	7
5	"Beyond You"	3	3	1	1	8
6	"Someone Is Calling"	2	4	4	2	12
7	"Watch Me Move"	9	9	9	7	34

Heat 2 – 15 January 2006
R/O	Artist	Song	Jury	Televote	Total	Place	Result
1	Casa Creola	"Easy esta noche"	13	4	14	6	—N/a
2	Afi	"Not That Beautiful"	30	6	36	3	Qualified
3	Tommy	"The Best Time of My Life"	11	8	19	5	—N/a
4	Barbara Dex	"Crazy"	26	18	44	1	Qualified
5	Beatoxic	"Feel Like"	4	2	6	7	—N/a
6	Els de Schepper	"Als ik je morgen ergens tegenkom"	15	10	25	4	Wildcard
7	Roxane	"Push It"	25	14	39	2	Qualified

Detailed Jury Votes
R/O	Song	Expert Jury	Press Jury	Radio Juries		Total
R/O	Song	Expert Jury	Press Jury	Radio 2	Donna	Total
1	"Easy esta noche"	2	4	2	5	13
2	"Not That Beautiful"	7	9	5	9	30
3	"The Best Time of My Life"	3	2	3	3	11
4	"Crazy"	5	5	9	7	26
5	"Feel Like"	1	1	1	1	4
6	"Als ik je morgen ergens tegenkom"	4	3	4	4	15
7	"Push It"	9	7	7	2	25

Heat 3 – 22 January 2006
R/O	Artist	Song	Jury	Televote	Total	Place	Result
1	Valérie Mouton	"I Can't Go On Like This"	10	4	14	6	—N/a
2	Kate Ryan	"Je t'adore"	34	10	44	1	Qualified
3	Kaye Styles	"Profile"	23	14	37	3	Qualified
4	Axel Devries	"Alleen jij"	8	2	10	7	—N/a
5	Laura D	"History Turning Round"	18	6	24	4	—N/a
6	Peter Evrard	"Coward"	24	18	42	2	Qualified
7	Pim	"I'm Your Man"	7	8	15	5	—N/a

Detailed Jury Votes
R/O	Song	Expert Jury	Press Jury	Radio Juries		Total
R/O	Song	Expert Jury	Press Jury	Radio 2	Donna	Total
1	"I Can't Go On Like This"	4	3	2	1	10
2	"Je t'adore"	7	9	9	9	34
3	"Profile"	9	4	5	5	23
4	"Alleen jij"	1	1	3	3	8
5	"History Turning Round"	5	5	4	4	18
6	"Coward"	3	7	7	7	24
7	"I'm Your Man"	2	2	1	2	7

Heat 4 – 29 January 2006
R/O	Artist	Song	Jury	Televote	Total	Place	Result
1	Kaden	"In Your Heaven"	10	2	12	6	—N/a
2	WOEST	"Gek"	14	8	22	4	—N/a
3	Ali vs. Laura	"I Belong to You Belong to Me"	8	4	12	6	—N/a
4	La Sakhra	"Wonderland"	28	10	38	2	Qualified
5	Triskèl	"I'll Be There for You"	8	6	14	5	—N/a
6	Belle Perez	"El mundo bailando"	34	18	52	1	Qualified
7	Eve Kempbell	"Not Right"	22	14	36	3	Qualified

Detailed Jury Votes
R/O	Song	Expert Jury	Press Jury	Radio Juries		Total
R/O	Song	Expert Jury	Press Jury	Radio 2	Donna	Total
1	"In Your Heaven"	2	3	4	1	10
2	"Gek"	4	4	2	4	14
3	"I Belong to You Belong to Me"	1	2	3	2	8
4	"Wonderland"	5	9	7	7	28
5	"I'll Be There for You"	3	1	1	3	8
6	"El mundo bailando"	9	7	9	9	34
7	"Not Right"	7	5	5	5	22

==== Semi-finals ====
The two semi-finals took place on 5 and 12 February 2006. In each show seven entries competed and the combination of results from an expert jury, a press jury, two radio jury groups and a public televote determined the top three that qualified to the final. "P.O.W.E.R." performed by Brahim was awarded a wildcard by the expert jury from the non-qualifying acts in the semi-finals to proceed to the final.

Semi-final 1 – 5 February 2006
R/O	Artist	Song	Jury	Televote	Total	Place	Result
1	Jeason	"Dame amor, dame vida"	5	4	9	7	—N/a
2	Eve Kempbell	"Not Right"	13	8	21	4	—N/a
3	Els de Schepper	"Als ik je morgen ergens tegenkom"	17	10	27	3	Qualified
4	Afi	"Not That Beautiful"	16	2	18	5	—N/a
5	Katerine	"Watch Me Move"	9	6	15	6	—N/a
6	Kaye Styles	"Profile"	30	14	44	2	Qualified
7	Kate Ryan	"Je t'adore"	34	18	52	1	Qualified

Detailed Jury Votes
R/O	Song	Expert Jury	Press Jury	Radio Juries		Total
R/O	Song	Expert Jury	Press Jury	Radio 2	Donna	Total
1	"Dame amor, dame vida"	1	1	2	1	5
2	"Not Right"	5	2	3	3	13
3	"Als ik je morgen ergens tegenkom"	4	4	5	4	17
4	"Not That Beautiful"	2	5	4	5	16
5	"Watch Me Move"	3	3	1	2	9
6	"Profile"	9	7	7	7	30
7	"Je t'adore"	7	9	9	9	34

Semi-final 2 – 12 February 2006
R/O	Artist	Song	Jury	Televote	Total	Place	Result
1	La Sakhra	"Wonderland"	36	8	44	1	Qualified
2	Roxane	"Push It"	5	2	7	7	—N/a
3	Sonny O'Brien	"I'll Be There for You"	7	4	11	6	—N/a
4	Brahim	"P.O.W.E.R."	22	10	32	4	Wildcard
5	Belle Perez	"El mundo bailando"	20	14	34	3	Qualified
6	Peter Evrard	"Coward"	15	6	21	5	—N/a
7	Barbara Dex	"Crazy"	19	18	37	2	Qualified

Detailed Jury Votes
R/O	Song	Expert Jury	Press Jury	Radio Juries		Total
R/O	Song	Expert Jury	Press Jury	Radio 2	Donna	Total
1	"Wonderland"	9	9	9	9	36
2	"Push It"	1	2	1	1	5
3	"I'll Be There for You"	2	1	2	2	7
4	"P.O.W.E.R."	7	7	4	4	22
5	"El mundo bailando"	5	3	7	5	20
6	"Coward"	3	4	5	3	15
7	"Crazy"	4	5	3	7	19

==== Final ====
The final took place on 19 February 2006 where the seven entries that qualified from the preceding two semi-finals competed. The winner, "Je t'adore" performed by Kate Ryan, was selected by the combination of results from an expert jury, a press jury, two radio jury groups, three international jury groups and a public televote. The international jury groups were selected following a study conducted by two independent professors in statistics on the three best forecasters of the Eurovision Song Contest in recent years.

Final – 19 February 2006
R/O	Artist	Song	Jury	Televote	Total	Place
1	Barbara Dex	"Crazy"	24	9	33	5
2	Brahim	"P.O.W.E.R"	23	15	38	4
3	Belle Perez	"El mundo bailando"	45	12	57	3
4	Els de Schepper	"Als ik je morgen ergens tegenkom"	17	3	20	7
5	La Sakhra	"Wonderland"	41	21	62	2
6	Kaye Styles	"Profile"	18	6	24	6
7	Kate Ryan	"Je t'adore"	49	27	76	1

Detailed Jury Votes
R/O	Song	Expert Jury	Press Jury	Radio Juries		International Juries			Total
R/O	Song	Expert Jury	Press Jury	Radio 2	Donna	Germany	Israel	Poland	Total
1	"Crazy"	3	1	5	2	5	3	5	24
2	"P.O.W.E.R"	9	3	1	4	3	2	1	23
3	"El mundo bailando"	2	5	9	9	4	7	9	45
4	"Als ik je morgen ergens tegenkom"	1	4	2	1	2	4	3	17
5	"Wonderland"	7	9	4	7	7	5	2	41
6	"Profile"	4	2	3	3	1	1	4	18
7	"Je t'adore"	5	7	7	5	9	9	7	49

==== Ratings ====
Viewing figures by show
Show	Date	Viewing figures		Ref.
Show	Date	Nominal	Share	Ref.
Heat 1	8 January 2006	1,182,000	42.90%	
Heat 2	15 January 2006	1,196,230	45.97%	
Heat 3	22 January 2006	1,261,000	45.66%	
Heat 4	29 January 2006	1,364,341	49.57%	
Semi-final 1	5 February 2006	1,326,952	46.70%	
Semi-final 2	12 February 2006	1,392,770	51.77%	
Final	9 March 2006	1,772,000	60.30%	

=== Promotion ===
Kate Ryan made several appearances across Europe to specifically promote "Je t'adore" as the Belgian Eurovision entry. Ryan took part in promotional activities in Macedonia on 7 April and performed during the HRT 1 programme Studio 10 in Croatia on 8 April. On 9 April, Ryan appeared in and performed during the TV SLO1 programme Spet doma in Slovenia. Ryan also took part in promotional activities in Greece on 13 and 14 April which included performances during the ANT1 show Proinos Kafes, and in Malta between 15 and 17 April where she appeared during the special Eurovision shows Lejn il-Eurovision on NET TV and Eurovision Fever on Super One TV. On 22 April, Ryan performed in Turkey during the Star TV show Popstar Türkiye. On 4 May, Ryan completed promotional activities in the Netherlands where she appeared during the talk shows RTL Boulevard on RTL 4 and Jensen! on RTL 5. The promotional tour also featured television and radio appearances in Cyprus, Germany, Latvia, Sweden and Switzerland, and was financially supported by Flemish Minister of Culture Bert Anciaux and Kate Ryan's record company EMI with each of them allocating a subsidy of €60,000.

== At Eurovision ==
According to Eurovision rules, all nations with the exceptions of the host country, the "Big Four" (France, Germany, Spain, and the United Kingdom) and the ten highest placed finishers in the 2005 contest are required to qualify from the semi-final on 18 May 2006 in order to compete for the final on 20 May 2006; the top ten countries from the semi-final progress to the final. On 21 March 2006, a special allocation draw was held which determined the running order for the semi-final and Belgium was set to perform in position 7, following the entry from Albania and before the entry from Ireland. At the end of the semi-final, Belgium was not announced among the top 10 entries and therefore failed to qualify to compete in the final. It was later revealed that Belgium placed twelfth in the semi-final, receiving a total of 69 points.

The semi-final and the final were broadcast in Belgium by both the Flemish and Walloon broadcasters. VRT broadcast the shows on één with commentary in Dutch by Bart Peeters and André Vermeulen. RTBF televised the shows on La Une with commentary in French by Jean-Pierre Hautier. All shows were also broadcast by VRT on Radio 2 with commentary in Dutch by Michel Follet and Sven Pichal, and by RTBF on La Première with commentary in French by Patrick Duhamel and Thomas Gunzig. VRT appointed Yasmine (who held up a placard with the words "We Love Kate Ryan" during the voting) as its spokesperson to announce the Belgian votes during the final.

=== Voting ===
Below is a breakdown of points awarded to Belgium and awarded by Belgium in the semi-final and grand final of the contest. The nation awarded its 12 points to Armenia in the semi-final and the final of the contest.

==== Points awarded to Belgium ====
Points awarded to Belgium (Semi-final)
Score	Country
12 points	
10 points	
8 points	
7 points	Andorra; Malta; Netherlands
6 points	Monaco
5 points	Ireland; Slovenia; Sweden
4 points	Iceland; Poland
3 points	Denmark; Estonia; Finland; France
2 points	Lithuania; Portugal; Spain
1 point	Cyprus

==== Points awarded by Belgium ====
Points awarded by Belgium (Semi-final)
Score	Country
12 points	Armenia
10 points	Finland
8 points	Turkey
7 points	Lithuania
6 points	Bosnia and Herzegovina
5 points	Sweden
4 points	Netherlands
3 points	Ireland
2 points	Russia
1 point	Poland

Points awarded by Belgium (Final)
Score	Country
12 points	Armenia
10 points	Greece
8 points	Finland
7 points	Turkey
6 points	Bosnia and Herzegovina
5 points	Sweden
4 points	Lithuania
3 points	Russia
2 points	Romania
1 point	Germany
