= Every Song Is a Cry for Love =

2006 song by Brian Kennedy

Single by Brian Kennedy
- Language: English
- Released: 21 April 2006
- Length: 2:58
- Label: Curb Records

Eurovision Song Contest 2006 entry
- Country: Ireland
- Artist: Brian Kennedy
- Language: English
- Composer: Brian Kennedy
- Lyricist: Brian Kennedy

Finals performance
- Semi-final result: 9th
- Semi-final points: 79
- Final result: 10th
- Final points: 93

Entry chronology
- ◄ "Love?" (2005)
- "They Can't Stop the Spring" (2007) ►

"Every Song is a Cry for Love" was the Irish entry in the Eurovision Song Contest 2006, written and performed by Brian Kennedy in English. Notably, with its semi-final performance, it was the 1000th song to be performed on the Eurovision stage.

== Release ==
The song was released on April 21, 2006, and eventually peaked at Number 4 on the Irish Singles Chart.

== Eurovision Song Contest ==
=== Eurosong 2006 ===
Kennedy was selected to represent Ireland at the discretion of national broadcaster RTÉ, which then allowed the general public to choose the song during an edition of The Late Late Show in February, involving Kennedy singing two other songs which were not submitted by him. "Every Song Is a Cry for Love" was selected with a 47% of the total vote. A fourth song had earlier been disqualified by RTÉ, whose panel of judges Brendan Graham, Paul Brady and Shay Healy had shortlisted for the final. It was marred by controversy, as his own song was included after the judging panel had called for additional songs, leading to claims that he had gained an unfair advantage.

=== At Eurovision ===
It was performed eighth in the semi-final, following Belgium's Kate Ryan with "Je t'adore" and preceding Cyprus' Annette Artani with "Why Angels Cry", the 1000th Eurovision song ever according to the European Broadcasting Union, after Ireland was forced to qualify due to its failure to make the final the previous year, and came 9th with 79 points, thus becoming one of ten songs to qualify from the semi-final. BBC commentary during the semi-final set Kennedy's task up as "saving Ireland's Eurovision soul" (a reference to his country's dominant performance in the 1990s, later falling away). Indeed, after Ireland was announced as a qualifier, television footage clearly showed Kennedy mouthing "thank God" in the green room backstage.

The song was performed 21st in the final, following Croatia's Severina with "Moja štikla" and preceding Sweden's Carola with "Invincible". At the close of voting, it had received 93 points, placing 10th in a field of 24, thus giving Ireland an automatic berth in the final at the next edition of the contest.

The performance in the semi-final marked the 1000th Eurovision song of all time. He wore a black suit and was backed by Calum MacColl on an acoustic guitar and singing and three specialist singers: Una Healy, Fran King and Paula Gilmer, who wore maroon dresses and black shirts and suits. The gentle ballad did not involve any dancing.

The song was succeeded as Irish representative by Dervish with "They Can't Stop the Spring".

== Charts ==
Chart (2006)	Peak position
Ireland (IRMA)	4
