= Finland in the Eurovision Song Contest 2006 =

- Eurovision Song Contest 2006
- Participating broadcaster: Yleisradio (Yle)
- Country: Finland
- Selection process: Euroviisut 2006
- Selection date: 10 March 2006

Competing entry
- Song: "Hard Rock Hallelujah"
- Artist: Lordi
- Songwriters: Tomi Putaansuu

Placement
- Semi-final result: Qualified (1st, 292 points)
- Final result: 1st, 292 points

Participation chronology

Finland was represented at the Eurovision Song Contest 2006 with the song "Hard Rock Hallelujah", written by Tomi Putaansuu, and performed by the band Lordi. The Finnish participating broadcaster, Yleisradio (Yle), organised the national final Euroviisut 2006 to select its entry for the contest. 12 artists with two songs each were selected to compete in the national final, which consisted of four semi-finals and a final, taking place in February and March 2006. Twelve entries ultimately competed in the final on 10 March where votes from the public selected "Hard Rock Hallelujah" performed by Lordi as the winner.

Finland competed in the semi-final of the Eurovision Song Contest which took place on 18 May 2006. Performing during the show in position 16, "Hard Rock Hallelujah" was announced among the top 10 entries of the semi-final and therefore qualified to compete in the final on 20 May. This marked the first qualification to the final for Finland since the introduction of semi-finals in 2004. It was later revealed that Finland placed first out of the 23 participating countries in the semi-final with 292 points. In the final, Finland performed in position 17 and placed first out of the 24 participating countries, winning the contest with 292 points. This was Finland's first win in the Eurovision Song Contest since it began participating in 1961.

== Background ==
Prior to the 2006 contest, Yleisradio (Yle) had participated in the Eurovision Song Contest representing Finland thirty-nine times since its first entry in 1961. Its best result in the contest achieved in 1973 where the song "Tom Tom Tom" performed by Marion Rung placed sixth.

As part of its duties as participating broadcaster, Yle organises the selection of its entry in the Eurovision Song Contest and broadcasts the event in the country. The broadcaster confirmed its intentions to participate at the 2006 contest on 12 August 2005. Yle has selected its entries through national final competitions that have varied in format over the years. Since 1961, a selection show that was often titled Euroviisukarsinta highlighted that the purpose of the program was to select a song for Eurovision. Along with its participation confirmation, the broadcaster announced that it would select its entry for the 2006 contest through the Euroviisut selection show.

== Before Eurovision ==
=== Euroviisut 2006 ===
Euroviisut 2006 was the national final organised by Yle to select its entry for the Eurovision Song Contest 2006. The competition consisted of five shows that commenced with the first of four semi-finals on 13 January 2006 and concluded with a final on 10 March 2006. All shows were broadcast on Yle TV2 and via radio with commentary in Swedish by Hans Johansson on Yle Radio Vega. The final was also broadcast via radio on Yle Radio Suomi.

==== Format ====
The format of the competition consisted of five shows: four semi-finals and a final. Three artists each competed with two songs in each semi-final and the winning song per act qualified to complete the twelve-song lineup in the final. The results for the semi-finals and the final were determined exclusively by a public vote. Public voting included the options of telephone and SMS voting. Prior to each of the four semi-finals, the public was able to vote in advance earlier the day each show was held.

==== Competing entries ====
Twelve artists were directly invited by Yle to compete in the national final following consultation with record companies and individual artists and presented on 7 November 2005. The entries competing in each semi-final were presented the day of the shows in weekly preview programmes on Yle Radio Suomi between 13 January 2006 and 3 February 2006. Before the final, Katariina Hänninen opted to translate her selected song "Pala taivasta" from Finnish to English.

Artist	Song	Songwriter(s)
Annika Eklund	"Shanghain valot"	Kerkko Koskinen, Kyösti Salokorpi
Annika Eklund	"Sinussa on jotain"	Esa Nieminen, Sinikka Svärd
Jane	"Sivuoireita"	Niclas Bergwall, Niclas Kings, Curtis A. Richardson, Pekka Eronen
Jane	"V.I.P."	Kyösti Salokorpi, Lee Jyrkkä
Jennie	"Look At Your Love"	Janne Hyöty, Jens Smedman, Sofie Björkgren-Näse
Jennie	"Take Me Higher"	Janne Hyöty, Thomas Karlsson, Jimmy Westerlund
Johanna Pakonen	"Kerta viimeinen"	Pertti Haverinen, Ilkka Vainio
Johanna Pakonen	"Liian monta yötä"	Pertti Haverinen, Ilkka Vainio
Katariina Hänninen	"Liian aikaisin"	Antti Vuorenmaa, Ilkka Vainio
Katariina Hänninen	"Pala taivasta"	Risto Asikainen, Ilkka Vainio
Katariina Hänninen	"Devil on My Shoulder"	Risto Asikainen, Ilkka Vainio
Kilpi	"Katharsis"	Pete Kilpi, Taage Laiho
Kilpi	"Toinen minä"	Pete Kilpi, Taage Laiho
Lordi	"Bringing Back the Balls to Rock"	Tomi Putaansuu
Lordi	"Hard Rock Hallelujah"	Tomi Putaansuu
Marita Taavitsainen	"Antaudun"	Antero Laakso
Marita Taavitsainen	"Enkeli itkee"	Ile Kallio, Kaija Kärkinen
Nina and Hanna-Riikka	"This Is What We Came For"	Niklas Rosström, Geir Rönning
Nina and Hanna-Riikka	"Who I Am"	Miqael Persson, Eric Mårtensson
Safe Six	"I Can't Wait"	Gary Revel Jr., Jukka Heikkilä
Safe Six	"Livin' It Up"	Gary Revel Jr., Jukka Heikkilä
Tomi Metsäketo	"Eternamente Maria"	Kisu Jernström, Petri Kaivanto
Tomi Metsäketo	"Un posto fra le nuvole"	Francesco Morettini, Luca Angelosanti, Tomi Metsäketo
Ville Pusa	"Over You"	Ville Pusa, Patric Sarin
Ville Pusa and Christa Renwall	"Eternally"	Ville Pusa, Patric Sarin

==== Semi-finals ====
The four semi-final shows took place on 13 January, 20 January, 27 January and 3 February 2006 at the Tohloppi Studios in Tampere, hosted by Finnish presenters Jaana Pelkonen and Heikki Paasonen. One song per competing artist qualified to the final based on the results from the public vote. In addition to the competing entries, former Finnish Eurovision entrants performed as the interval acts in the semi-finals: Katri Helena (1979 and 1993) and Kirka (1984) in the first semi-final, Marion Rung (1962 and 1973) as well as Markku Aro and Koivisto Sisters (1971) in the second semi-final, Vicky Rosti (1987) and CatCat (1994) in the third semi-final, and Jarkko and Laura (1969) as well as Riki Sorsa (1981) in the fourth semi-final.

Semi-final 1 – 13 January 2006
R/O	Artist	Song	Televote	Result
1	Tomi Metsäketo	"Eternamente Maria"	60%	Qualified
2	Jennie	"Look At Your Love"	23%	—N/a
3	Lordi	"Hard Rock Hallelujah"	58%	Qualified
4	Tomi Metsäketo	"Un posto fra le nuvole"	40%	—N/a
5	Jennie	"Take Me Higher"	77%	Qualified
6	Lordi	"Bringing Back the Balls to Rock"	42%	—N/a

Semi-final 2 – 20 January 2006
R/O	Artist	Song	Televote	Result
1	Johanna Pakonen	"Liian monta yötä"	35%	—N/a
2	Ville Pusa	"Over You"	16%	—N/a
3	Nina and Hanna-Riikka	"This Is What We Came For"	33%	—N/a
4	Johanna Pakonen	"Kerta viimeinen"	65%	Qualified
5	Ville Pusa and Christa Renwall	"Eternally"	84%	Qualified
6	Nina and Hanna-Riikka	"Who I Am"	67%	Qualified

Semi-final 3 – 27 January 2006
R/O	Artist	Song	Televote	Result
1	Annika Eklund	"Shanghain valot"	87%	Qualified
2	Jane	"V.I.P."	71%	Qualified
3	Kilpi	"Toinen minä"	38%	—N/a
4	Annika Eklund	"Sinussa on jotain"	13%	—N/a
5	Jane	"Sivuoireita"	29%	—N/a
6	Kilpi	"Katharsis"	62%	Qualified

Semi-final 4 – 3 February 2006
R/O	Artist	Song	Televote	Result
1	Marita Taavitsainen	"Enkeli itkee"	54%	Qualified
2	Katariina Hänninen	"Pala taivasta"	55%	Qualified
3	Safe Six	"Livin' It Up"	45%	—N/a
4	Marita Taavitsainen	"Antaudun"	46%	—N/a
5	Katariina Hänninen	"Liian aikaisin"	45%	—N/a
6	Safe Six	"I Can't Wait"	55%	Qualified

==== Final ====
The final took place on 10 March 2006 at Hall 994 of the Holiday Club Caribia in Turku, hosted by Finnish presenters Jaana Pelkonen, Heikki Paasonen, and Antero Mertaranta. The twelve entries that qualified from the preceding four semi-finals competed and the winner was selected over two rounds of public televoting. In the first round, the top six from the twelve competing entries qualified to the second round, the superfinal. In the superfinal, "Hard Rock Hallelujah" performed by Lordi was selected as the winner. A total of 213,050 votes were cast during the show: 54,554 in the final and 158,496 in the superfinal. In addition to the performances of the competing entries, the interval act featured Fredi (who represented Finland in 1976) and Friends as well as Geir Rönning (who represented Finland in 2005).

Final – 10 March 2006
R/O	Artist	Song	Televote	Place
1	Annika Eklund	"Shanghain valot"	4,145	4
2	Nina and Hanna-Riikka	"Who I Am"	1,793	7
3	Safe Six	"I Can't Wait"	1,480	8
4	Kilpi	"Katharsis"	1,816	6
5	Jane	"V.I.P."	2,774	5
6	Marita Taavitsainen	"Enkeli itkee"	516	12
7	Katariina Hänninen	"Devil on My Shoulder"	970	11
8	Johanna Pakonen	"Kerta viimeinen"	1,456	9
9	Ville Pusa and Christa Renwall	"Eternally"	1,308	10
10	Lordi	"Hard Rock Hallelujah"	29,150	1
11	Jennie	"Take Me Higher"	4,311	3
12	Tomi Metsäketo	"Eternamente Maria"	4,835	2

Superfinal – 10 March 2006
R/O	Artist	Song	Televote	Place
1	Annika Eklund	"Shanghain valot"	19,565	3
2	Kilpi	"Katharsis"	4,685	6
3	Jane	"V.I.P."	6,308	5
4	Lordi	"Hard Rock Hallelujah"	67,369	1
5	Jennie	"Take Me Higher"	15,138	4
6	Tomi Metsäketo	"Eternamente Maria"	45,431	2

== At Eurovision ==
According to Eurovision rules, all nations with the exceptions of the host country, the "Big Four" (France, Germany, Spain and the United Kingdom) and the ten highest placed finishers in the 2005 contest are required to qualify from the semi-final on 18 May 2006 in order to compete for the final on 20 May 2006; the top ten countries from the semi-final progress to the final. On 21 March 2006, a special allocation draw was held which determined the running order for the semi-final and Finland was set to perform in position 16, following the entry from Ukraine and before the entry from the Netherlands.

At the end of the semi-final, Finland was announced as having finished in the top 10 and subsequently qualifying for the grand final. This marked the first qualification to the final for Finland since the introduction of semi-finals in 2004. It was later revealed that Finland placed first in the semi-final, receiving a total of 292 points. The draw for the running order for the final was done by the presenters during the announcement of the ten qualifying countries during the semi-final and Finland was drawn to perform in position 17, following the entry from Greece and before the entry from Ukraine. Finland won the contest placing first with a score of 292 points. This was Finland's first victory in the Eurovision Song Contest since their first participation in 1961.

The semi-final and the final were televised in Finland on Yle TV2 with commentary in Finnish by Jaana Pelkonen, Heikki Paasonen, and Asko Murtomäki. The three shows were also broadcast on Yle FST5 with commentary in Swedish by Thomas Lundin as well as via radio with Finnish commentary by Sanna Pirkkalainen and Jorma Hietamäki on Yle Radio Suomi. Yle appointed Nina Tapio as its spokesperson to announce the Finnish votes during the final.

=== Voting ===
Below is a breakdown of points awarded to Finland and awarded by Finland in the semi-final and grand final of the contest. The nation awarded its 12 points to Bosnia and Herzegovina in the semi-final and to Russia in the final of the contest.

==== Points awarded to Finland ====
Points awarded to Finland (Semi-final)
Score	Country
12 points	Estonia; Germany; Iceland; Poland; Sweden; United Kingdom
10 points	Andorra; Belgium; Croatia; Denmark; Ireland; Lithuania; Malta; Slovenia; Spain
8 points	Belarus; Bosnia and Herzegovina; Greece; Latvia; Norway; Portugal; Russia; Serbia and Montenegro
7 points	Bulgaria; Cyprus; Israel; Macedonia
6 points	Netherlands; Turkey; Ukraine
5 points	France; Moldova; Romania; Switzerland
4 points	
3 points	
2 points	
1 point	

Points awarded to Finland (Final)
Score	Country
12 points	Denmark; Estonia; Greece; Iceland; Norway; Poland; Sweden; United Kingdom
10 points	Andorra; Croatia; Germany; Ireland; Lithuania; Spain
8 points	Belgium; France; Latvia; Russia; Slovenia; Switzerland
7 points	Belarus; Bosnia and Herzegovina; Israel; Malta; Netherlands; Serbia and Montenegro; Turkey; Ukraine
6 points	Macedonia; Moldova; Portugal
5 points	Bulgaria; Cyprus
4 points	Romania
3 points	
2 points	
1 point	

==== Points awarded by Finland ====
Points awarded by Finland (Semi-final)
Score	Country
12 points	Bosnia and Herzegovina
10 points	Sweden
8 points	Lithuania
7 points	Iceland
6 points	Russia
5 points	Estonia
4 points	Ireland
3 points	Belgium
2 points	Ukraine
1 point	Slovenia

Points awarded by Finland (Final)
Score	Country
12 points	Russia
10 points	Bosnia and Herzegovina
8 points	Lithuania
7 points	Sweden
6 points	Romania
5 points	Norway
4 points	Ireland
3 points	Denmark
2 points	Ukraine
1 point	Greece
