= Andorra in the Eurovision Song Contest 2006 =

- Eurovision Song Contest 2006
- Participating broadcaster: Ràdio i Televisió d'Andorra (RTVA)
- Country: Andorra
- Selection process: Internal selection
- Announcement date: 8 March 2006

Competing entry
- Song: "Sense tu"
- Artist: Jenny
- Songwriters: Rafael Artesero; Joan Antoni Rechi

Placement
- Semi-final result: Failed to qualify (23rd)

Participation chronology

Andorra was represented at the Eurovision Song Contest 2006 with the song "Sense tu", composed by Rafael Artesero, with lyrics by Joan Antoni Rechi, and performed by Jenny. The Andorran participating broadcaster, Ràdio i Televisió d'Andorra (RTVA), internally selected its entry for the contest. "Sense tu" was first presented to the public on 8 March 2006 during a special gala show entitled Alguna cosa batega.

Andorra competed in the semi-final of the Eurovision Song Contest which took place on 18 May 2006. Performing during the show in position 4, "Sense tu" was not announced among the top 10 entries of the semi-final and therefore did not qualify to compete in the final. It was later revealed that Andorra placed twenty-third (last (Note: The official Eurovision site lists Serbia and Montenegro as being placed last (24th) in the semi-final of Eurovision Song Contest 2006 since Serbia and Montenegro withdrew from the competition but still voted, although originally automatically qualified for the grand final without having to compete in semi-finals based on last year's top 10 result. However, Andorra was the last placed in the semi-final among countries that did send a song to the competition.)) out of the 23 participating countries in the semi-final with 8 points.

== Background ==
Prior to the 2006 contest, Ràdio i Televisió d'Andorra (RTVA) had participated in the Eurovision Song Contest representing Andorra two times since its first entry in 2004. To this point, the country has yet to feature in a final, which included 2004 with the song "Jugarem a estimar-nos" performed by Marta Roure which placed eighteenth out of the 22 participating entries in the semi-final, and 2005 with the song "La mirada interior" performed by Marian van de Wal which placed twenty-third out of the 25 participating entries in the semi-final.

As part of its duties as participating broadcaster, RTVA organises the selection of its entry in the Eurovision Song Contest and broadcasts the event in the country. The broadcaster confirmed its intentions to participate at the 2006 contest on 13 September 2005. In 2004 and 2005, RTVA had set up a national final in order to select its entry for the contest. However, the broadcaster opted for an internal selection for the first time to select the 2006 entry.

== Before Eurovision ==
=== Internal selection ===
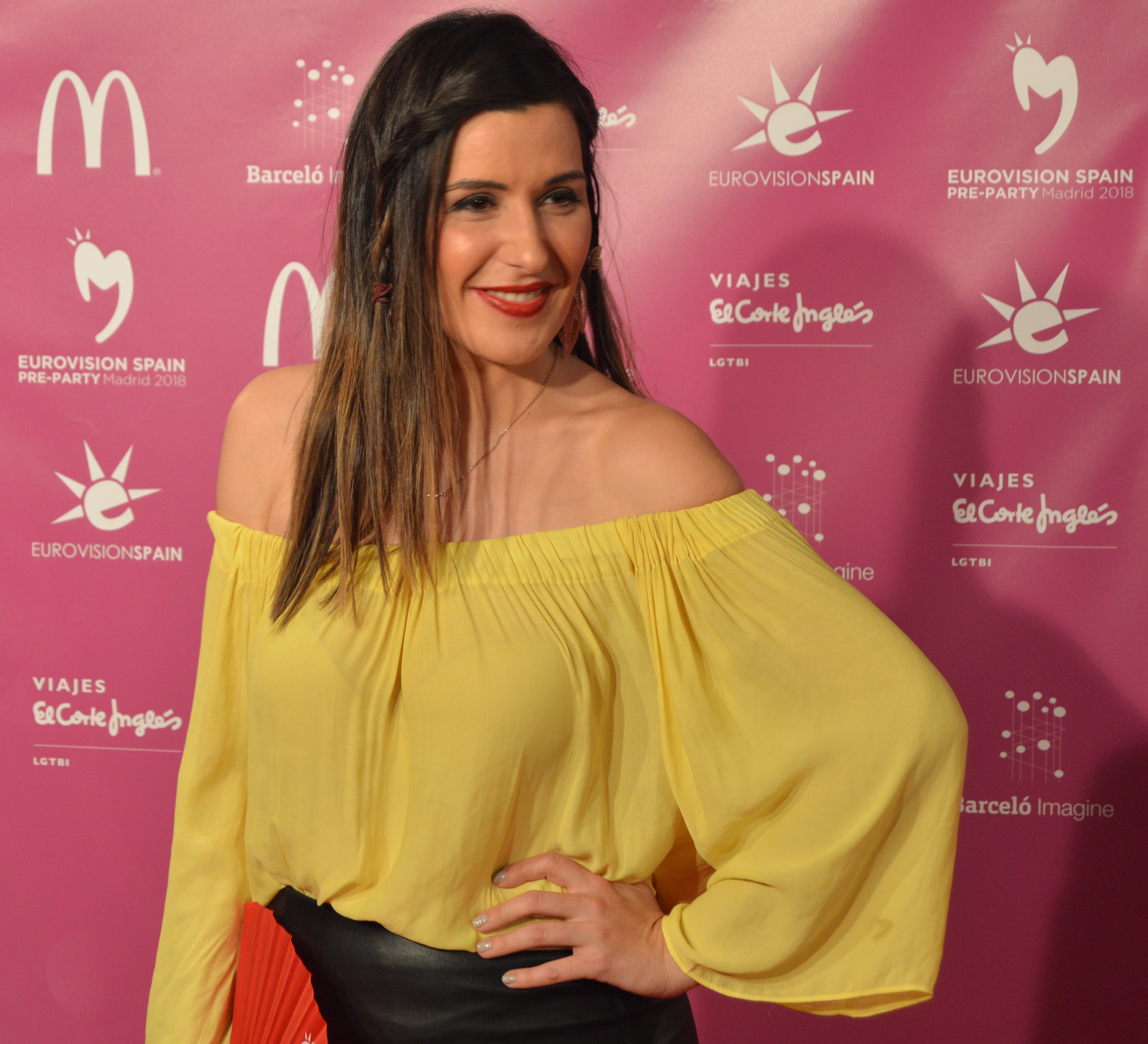
Jenny was internally selected to represent Andorra in the Eurovision Song Contest 2006

RTVA selected its entry for the Eurovision Song Contest 2006 through an internal selection. A submission period was open for artists and composers to submit their entries between 15 October 2005 and 31 December 2005. Both artists and songwriters could be of any nationality, but artists with Andorran citizenship were given priority. Songwriters were able to submit up to three songs. A total of 87 submissions were received at the conclusion of the submission period. 49 artists applied without a song, 37 songs were submitted without an artist attached and one artist applied with a song. 26 of the artists that applied without a song were foreign: 21 from Spain, one from France and four from other countries. On 15 February 2006, RTVA revealed that four artists, three from Andorra and one from Spain, and three songs, two of them being written by Andorran songwriters, had been shortlisted.

In late February 2006, Andorran newspaper Diari d' Andorra reported that Spanish singer Jenny had been selected by RTVA to represent Andorra in Athens. Jenny with the song "Sense tu", written by Rafael Artesero and Joan Antoni Rechi, was confirmed as the Andorran entry on 8 March 2006 during a special gala show entitled Alguna cosa batega, which took place at the Auditori Claror del Centre Cultural i de Congressos Lauredià in Sant Julià de Lòria, hosted by Meri Picart and Josep Lluís Trabal and broadcast on ATV as well as online via the broadcaster's website atv.ad. In addition to the presentation of the song, the gala show featured guest performances by the band Gossos and Whiskyn's, singer Marc Parrot, Marta Roure (who represented Andorra in 2004) and Marian van de Wal (who represented Andorra in 2005).

=== Promotion ===
Jenny specifically promoted "Sense tu" as the Andorran Eurovision entry by taking part in promotional activities in Malta and the Netherlands. Such promotional activities included an appearance during the NET TV show Lejn il-Eurovision in Malta on 30 April.

== At Eurovision ==
According to Eurovision rules, all nations with the exceptions of the host country, the "Big Four" (France, Germany, Spain and the United Kingdom) and the ten highest placed finishers in the 2005 contest are required to qualify from the semi-final on 18 May 2006 in order to compete for the final on 20 May 2006; the top ten countries from the semi-final progress to the final. On 21 March 2006, a special allocation draw was held which determined the running order for the semi-final and Andorra was set to perform in position 4, following the entry from Slovenia and before the entry from Belarus. At the end of the show, Andorra was not announced among the top 10 entries in the semi-final and therefore failed to qualify to compete in the final. It was later revealed that Andorra placed twenty-third in the semi-final, receiving a total of 8 points.

The semi-final and the final were broadcast in Andorra on ATV with commentary by Meri Picart and Josep Lluís Trabal. RTVA appointed Xavi Palma as its spokesperson to announce the Andorran votes during the final.

=== Voting ===
Below is a breakdown of points awarded to Andorra and awarded by Andorra in the semi-final and grand final of the contest. The nation awarded its 12 points to Portugal in the semi-final and to Spain in the final of the contest.

==== Points awarded to Andorra ====
Points awarded to Andorra (Semi-final)
| Score | Country |
|---|---|
| 12 points | |
| 10 points | |
| 8 points | Spain |
| 7 points | |
| 6 points | |
| 5 points | |
| 4 points | |
| 3 points | |
| 2 points | |
| 1 point | |

==== Points awarded by Andorra ====
Points awarded by Andorra (Semi-final)
| Score | Country |
|---|---|
| 12 points | Portugal |
| 10 points | Finland |
| 8 points | Sweden |
| 7 points | Belgium |
| 6 points | Ukraine |
| 5 points | Lithuania |
| 4 points | Russia |
| 3 points | Monaco |
| 2 points | Netherlands |
| 1 point | Bosnia and Herzegovina |

Points awarded by Andorra (Final)
| Score | Country |
|---|---|
| 12 points | Spain |
| 10 points | Finland |
| 8 points | Sweden |
| 7 points | Lithuania |
| 6 points | Russia |
| 5 points | Ukraine |
| 4 points | Ireland |
| 3 points | Romania |
| 2 points | United Kingdom |
| 1 point | Greece |
