= Antanas Nedzinskas =

Lithuanian politician (born 1981)

Member of the Seimas
- Incumbent
- Assumed office 14 November 2024
- Constituency: Multi-member
- In office 17 November 2008 – 16 November 2012
- Preceded by: Kęstutis Čilinskas
- Succeeded by: Raimundas Markauskas
- Constituency: Dzūkija

Personal details
- Born: 15 March 1981 (age 45)
- Party: Social Democratic Party

Antanas Nedzinskas (born 15 March 1981) is a Lithuanian singer and politician of the Social Democratic Party. He was elected member of the Seimas in the 2024 parliamentary election, having previously served from 2008 to 2012. He competed in the national selection for the Eurovision Song Contest 2006.
