= Atlanta (singer) =

Lithuanian singer

Elena Puidokaitė (better known by her stage name Atlanta; born 5 April 1981) is a Lithuanian pop singer. She made her debut in 1998, when the music manager Martynas Tyla offered her to join the new band "Cushions". Their most successful hit "Winter" was recorded with Atlanta.

Atlanta's first two solo's, "Never" and new version of Lemon Joy song "White City" were recorded in “Zymozek Sonic” studio with Algis Drėma's help. Also that group singer Igoris Kofas created the first hit "And Girls want to love" music.

Atlanta debuted with album “Girls want to love” in August 2001. She created a new version of old song "Swallows, swallows" with Andrius Mamontovas, when the second album "The wind told me" has just appeared.

== Musical activity ==
=== Albums ===
- 2001: Mergaitės nori mylėt "Girls want to love"
- 2003: Vėjas man pasakė "The wind told me"
- 2005: Širdis "Heart"
- 2007: Jaunystė

=== Radio singles ===
- 2001: Draugai "Friends"
- 2001: Mergaitės nori mylėt "Girls want to love"
- 2001: Man patinka taip gyvent "I like to live like that"
- 2002: Gero vėjo (with Stano)
- 2002: Nieko geriau nėra
- 2002: Dviese
- 2002: Viskas, ką turiu
- 2002: Vėjas man pasakė
- 2003: Kregždutės, Kregždutės (with Andrius Mamontovas)
- 2004: Me And My Girls
- 2005: Pas(si)lik
- 2005: Man Tavęs
- 2005: Tu mano klaida
- 2005: Žalios Mėtos
- 2006: Sakyk man taip
- 2006: Tegul sako

== Awards ==
Radiocentras musical awards for the best song.
