= Monaco in the Eurovision Song Contest 2006 =

- Eurovision Song Contest 2006
- Participating broadcaster: Télé Monte-Carlo (TMC)
- Country: Monaco
- Selection process: Internal selection
- Announcement date: Artist: 2 March 2006; Song: 14 March 2006

Competing entry
- Song: "La Coco-Dance"
- Artist: Séverine Ferrer
- Songwriters: J. Woodfeel; Iren Bo

Placement
- Semi-final result: Failed to qualify (21st)

Participation chronology

Monaco was represented at the Eurovision Song Contest 2006 with the song "La Coco-Dance", written by J. Woodfeel and Iren Bo, and performed by Séverine Ferrer. The Monégasque participating broadcaster, Télé Monte-Carlo (TMC), internally selected its entry for the contest. The song and the performer were announced on 2 March 2006, while the song was presented on 14 March 2006 during the SR Sverige radio programme Diggil-ej.

Monaco competed in the semi-final of the Eurovision Song Contest which took place on 18 May 2006. Performing during the show in position 10, "La Coco-Dance" was not announced among the top 10 entries of the semi-final and therefore did not qualify to compete in the final. It was later revealed that Monaco placed twenty-first out of the 23 participating countries in the semi-final with 14 points. As of 2025, this was the last entry from Monaco in the contest, before TMC withdrew the following year. The absence has continued in every edition since.

== Background ==
Prior to the 2006 contest, Télé Monte-Carlo (TMC) has participated in the Eurovision Song Contest representing Monaco twenty-three times since its first entry in 1959. It has won the contest once (in 1971 with the song "Un banc, un arbre, une rue" performed by Séverine), making it the only entry from a microstate to have won the contest to date. It has also placed last on two occasions: in 1959 and in 1966 which also received nul points. Between 1980 and 2003, Monaco did not participate in the contest with TMC citing financial reasons and lack of interest, while it returned in 2004 with the song "Notre planète" performed by Maryon but failed to qualify to the final from the semi-final. In 2005, "Tout de moi" performed by Lise Darly, once again failed to qualify to the final.

As part of its duties as participating broadcaster, TMC organises the selection of its entry in the Eurovision Song Contest and broadcasts the event in the country. The broadcaster had selected all its entries through an internal selection, a method that was continued for its 2006 participation.

== Before Eurovision ==
=== Internal selection ===
TMC internally selected its entry for the Eurovision Song Contest 2006. On 2 March 2006, it announced that Séverine Ferrer would represent Monaco with the song "La Coco-Dance". Ferrer, who was previously one of the twelve performers shortlisted to represent Monaco in 2005, was selected following audition rounds held in Monaco and Paris in January 2006 where the French Eurovision Head of Delegation Bruno Berberes was also involved in. TMC also announced that Ferrer's stage performance in Athens would be choreographed by Bruno Vandelli.

"La Coco-Dance" was written by Philippe Bosco and Irka Bochenko under the respective pseudonyms J. Woodfeel and Iren Bo, and was selected in early December 2005 from several proposals received by record companies. Bosco had also previously written the Monégasque entries in 2004 and 2005. "La Coco-Dance" features lyrics in French and Tahitian, marking the first song in the contest to feature lyrics in Tahitian. The song was presented to the public on 14 March 2006 during the SR Sverige radio programme Diggil-ej, hosted by Kris Boswell.

== At Eurovision ==
According to Eurovision rules, all nations with the exceptions of the host country, the "Big Four" (France, Germany, Spain, and the United Kingdom) and the ten highest placed finishers in the 2005 contest are required to qualify from the semi-final on 18 May 2006 in order to compete for the final on 20 May 2006; the top ten countries from the semi-final progress to the final. On 21 March 2006, an allocation draw was held which determined the running order for the semi-final and Monaco was set to perform in position 10, following the entry from Cyprus and before the entry from Macedonia. At the end of the show, Monaco was not announced among the top 10 entries in the semi-final and therefore failed to qualify to compete in the final. It was later revealed that Monaco placed twenty-first in the semi-final, receiving a total of 14 points.

Both the semi-final and the final were broadcast in Monaco on TMC with commentary by Bernard Montiel and Églantine Éméyé. TCM also appointed Éméyé as its spokesperson to announced the results of the Monégasque jury during the final.

=== Voting ===
Between 1998 and 2008, the voting was calculated by 100% televoting from viewers across Europe. However, in 2005 the EBU introduced an undisclosed threshold number of televotes that would have to be registered in each voting country in order to make that country's votes valid. If that number was not reached, the country's backup jury would vote instead. In both the semi-final and final of the contest, this affected several countries including Monaco. Therefore, the country had to use a backup jury panel to calculate its results. This jury judged each entry based on: vocal capacity; the stage performance; the song's composition and originality; and the overall impression of the act. In addition, no member of a national jury was permitted to be related in any way to any of the competing acts in such a way that they cannot vote impartially and independently.

Below is a breakdown of points awarded to Monaco and awarded by Monaco in the semi-final and grand final of the contest. The nation awarded its 12 points to Bosnia and Herzegovina in the semi-final and the final of the contest.

==== Points awarded to Monaco ====
Points awarded to Monaco (Semi-final)
Score	Country
12 points	
10 points	
8 points	France
7 points	
6 points	
5 points	
4 points	
3 points	Andorra
2 points	Estonia
1 point	Poland

==== Points awarded by Monaco ====
Points awarded by Monaco (Semi-final)
Score	Country
12 points	Bosnia and Herzegovina
10 points	Cyprus
8 points	Sweden
7 points	Ireland
6 points	Belgium
5 points	Estonia
4 points	Lithuania
3 points	Slovenia
2 points	Ukraine
1 point	Iceland

Points awarded by Monaco (Final)
Score	Country
12 points	Bosnia and Herzegovina
10 points	Ireland
8 points	Latvia
7 points	Lithuania
6 points	Switzerland
5 points	Sweden
4 points	Croatia
3 points	France
2 points	Ukraine
1 point	Norway
