= Gravel (Lithuanian band) =

Lithuanian musical group

- Origin: Vilnius, Lithuania
- Genres: Indie rock, pop, alternative rock
- Years active: 2003—2008
- Labels: Prior Records
- Past members: Tomaš Sinicki; Miroslav Sinicki; Vladislav Gaiževski; Erik Ševčuvianec

Gravel was a Lithuanian rock band. In 2006, the band performed at Lithuanian Eurovision preliminaries and took fourth place.

== Biography ==
The band was officially created in 2003 and consisted of Tomaš Sinicki, his brother Miroslav Sinicki, Vladislav Gaiževski and Erik Ševčuvianec, childhood friends.

In 2006 the band released their first album Pockets Full of Fun.

In 2007 Gravel was awarded as the "Best rock band" by A.lt, a Lithuanian alternative music awards show. They also claimed an award of the "Year's best debut" in both Pravda and Bravo awards. Gravel also filmed their first music video "Easter song" that was broadcast by MTV.

Their second album Dirty Beauty was released on April 1, 2008, April Fools Day, on the web and was available to download for free. Even before this album release, the band leader Tomas announced that Gravel is to be disbanded.

It was the first Lithuanian album distributed in this way.

== Discography ==
- Pockets Full of Fun (2006)
- Dirty Beauty (2008)
