= InCulto =

Lithuanian music group

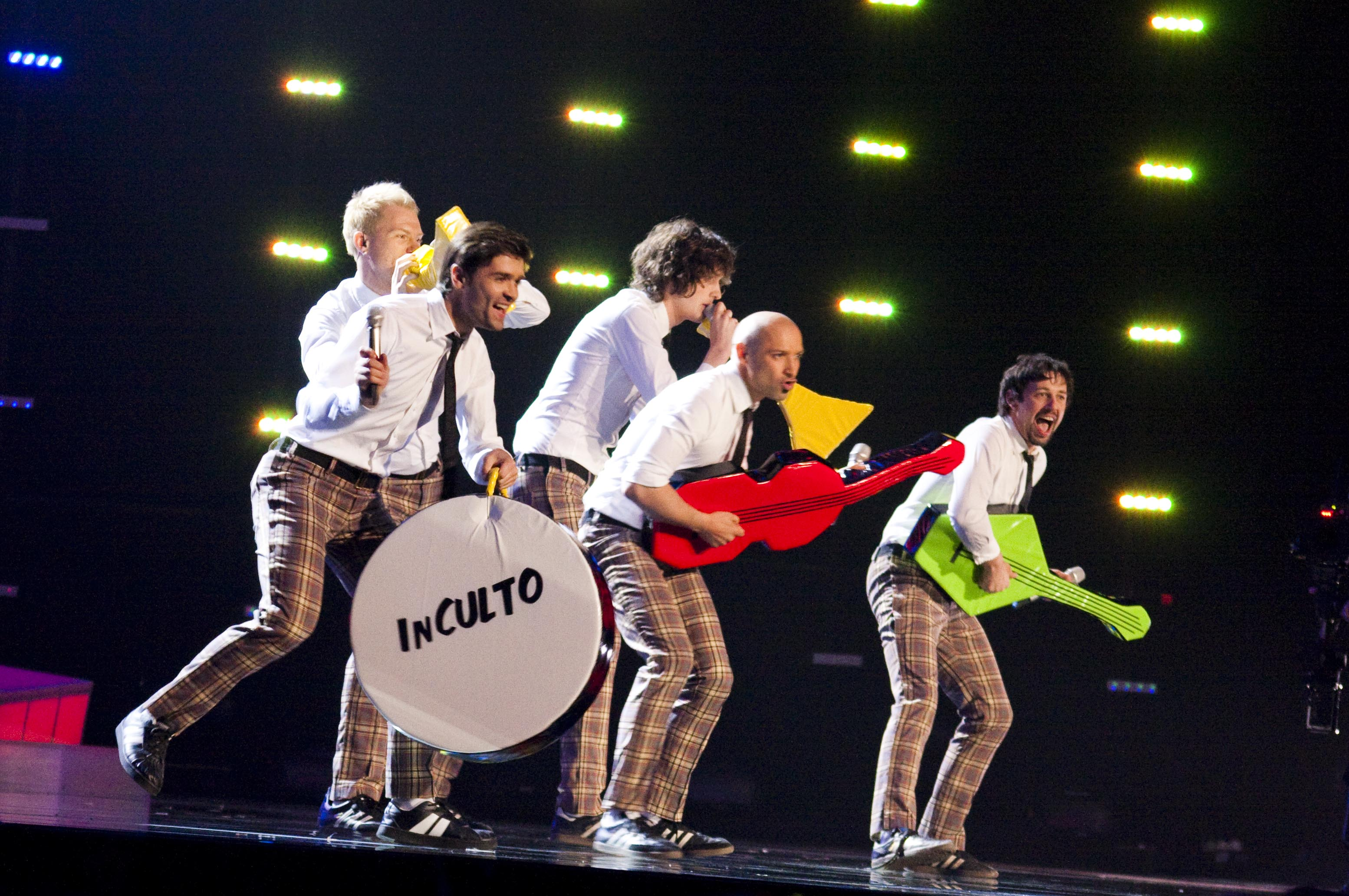
- InCulto performing at the Eurovision Song Contest 2010.

Background information
- Origin: Lithuania
- Genres: Ska, funk
- Years active: 2003–2011
- Members: Jurgis Didžiulis; Aurelijus Morlencas; Sergej Makidon; Jievaras Jasinskis; Laurynas Lapė

InCulto was a Lithuanian music group. It has the following members: Colombian-born Lithuanian Jurgis Didžiulis (lead vocal), Aurelijus Morlencas, Sergej Makidon, Jievaras Jasinskis, and Laurynas Lapė.

== Eurovision 2010 ==
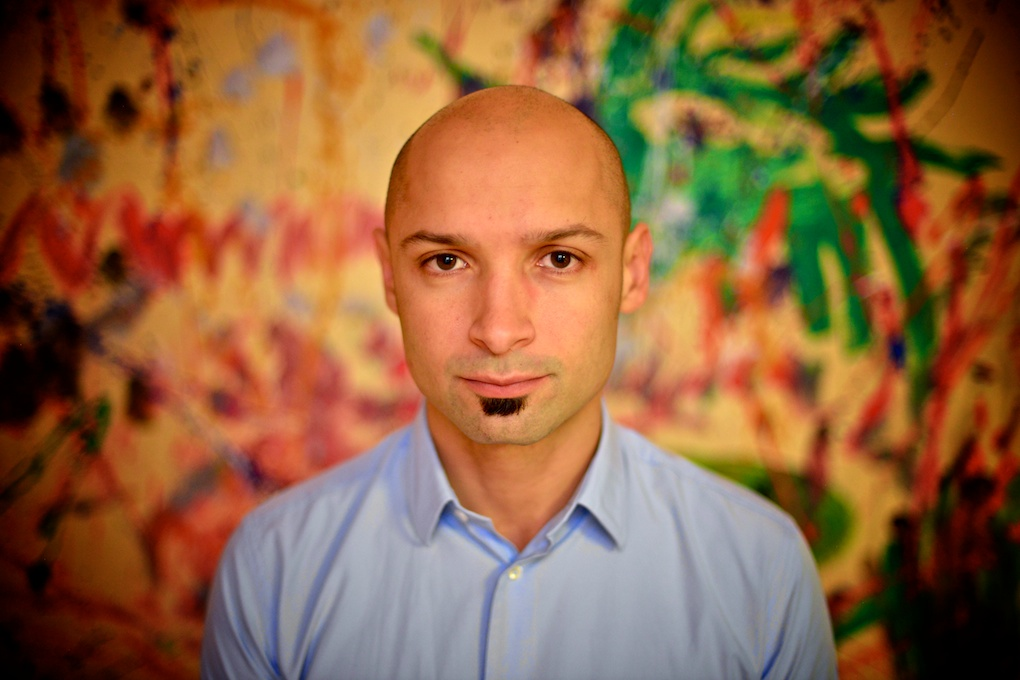
Lead singer Jurgis Didžiulis

In their first Eurovision attempt, the band came second after LT United in the Lithuanian national final of 2006 with their song Welcome To Lithuania. On 4 March 2010, Inculto won the Lithuanian national final to represent Lithuania in the Eurovision Song Contest 2010. They performed Eastern European Funk in the second semi-final held on 27 May 2010 in Oslo, Norway. The band did not receive enough points to get into the final. However, they did receive top points (12) from one country, Ireland.

== Splitting up ==
The band announced in a Facebook post that they would split up at the end of January 2011. They also decided to finish up by releasing their last album for free. In the post, they say that they are very happy with 2010 and would like to stop at a high point for the band.

== Discography ==
=== Albums ===
- PostSovPop (2004)
- Marijos Žemės Superhitai (2007)
- Closer Than You Think (2010)

=== Singles ===
- "Jei labai nori" (with Linas Karalius) (2004)
- "Suk, suk ratelį" (2004)
- "Boogaloo" (2005)
- "Welcome To Lithuania" (2006)
- "Reikia bandyt" (feat. Erica Jennings) (2007)
- "Pasiilgau namų" (feat. Andrius Rimiškis) (2007)
- "Eastern European Funk" (2010)

== Awards and nominations ==
Year	Nominee / work	Award	Result
2004	InCulto	Best New Act in Bravo Music Awards	Won
2005	InCulto	Best Band in Bravo Music Awards	Won
2005	InCulto	Best Alternative Act in Radiocentras Music Awards	Won
2006	InCulto	MTV Europe Music Award for Best Baltic Act	Nominated

Awards and achievements
Preceded by Sasha Son with "Love"	Lithuania in the Eurovision Song Contest; 2010	Succeeded by Evelina Sašenko with "C‘est ma vie"
