= Andrius Mamontovas =

Lithuanian rock musician

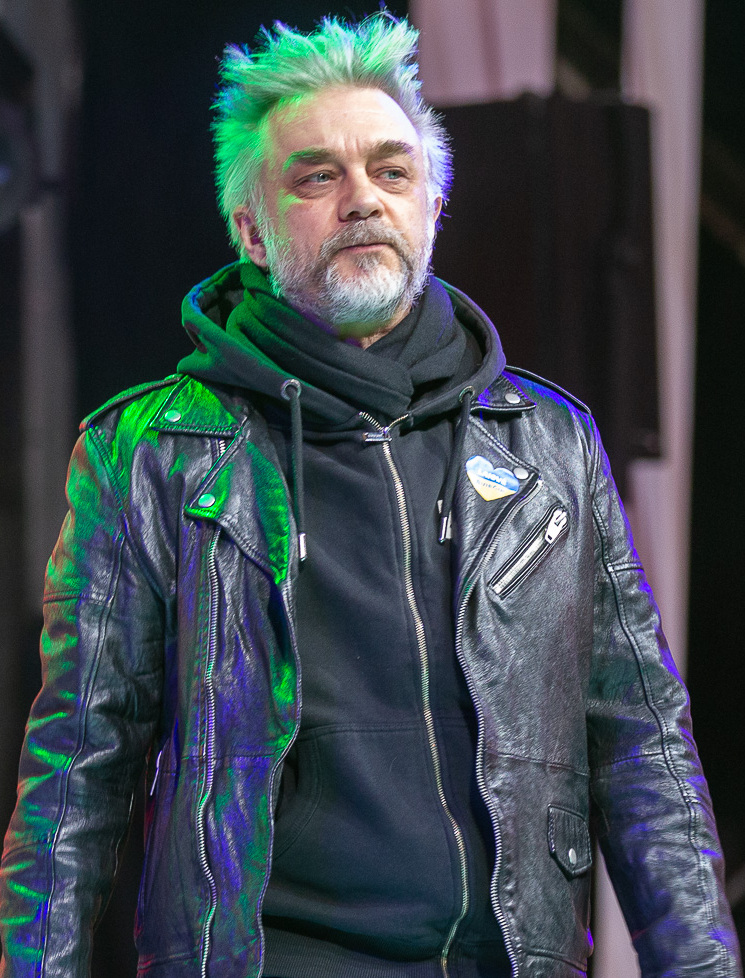
- Andrius Mamontovas in March 2022

Background information
- Born: Andrius Mamontovas; 23 August 1967 (age 58); Vilnius, Lithuania
- Genres: rock, alternative, pop rock
- Occupations: Musician, Guitarist, Songwriter, record producer, actor
- Instruments: vocals, Guitar, drums, Keyboard
- Years active: 1983–present
- Label: Mono Stereo Įrašai

Andrius Mamontovas (born 23 August 1967) is a Lithuanian rock musician. He is also a songwriter, actor, performer and record producer. He was one of the co-founders of the Lithuanian rock band Foje and the initiator of the LT United project.

== Personal life ==
He was born in Vilnius in 1967. Andrius Mamontovas and his brother Justas are the sons of Dr. Viktoras Mamontovas (Russian: Виктор Мамонтов; 1942–2005), a Doctor of Medical Sciences and professor originally from Arkhangelsk, who worked in Lithuania from 1966 as a radiologist and later headed the Radiology Department at Vilnius Santariškės Hospital. Their father was of mixed Russian and Komi descent, while their mother, Margarita Mamontova (née Čiplytė), Lithuanian — a medical professional and lecturer at the Vilnius Medical School. Since 1993, he has been a vegetarian.

== Career ==
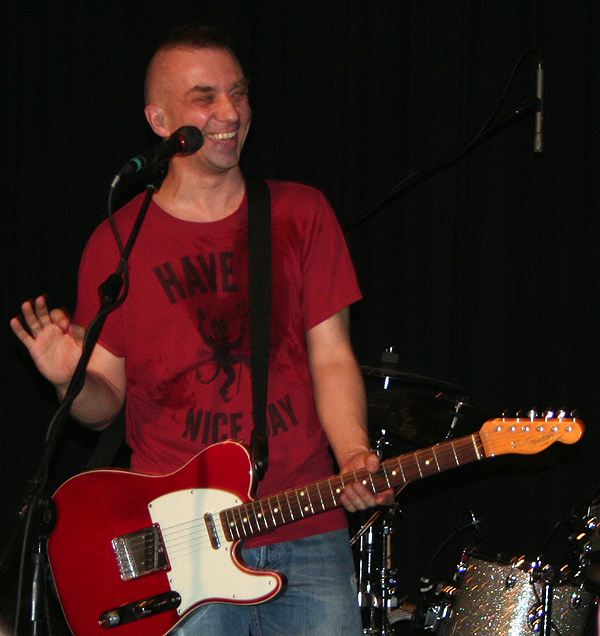

In 1983, Andrius Mamontovas began his musical quest by forming Foje, one of the most popular bands in Lithuania. From 1983 until 1997 the band released 14 successful albums and won every possible music award along with the national acclaim. Among their many accomplishments, Foje toured European and American clubs, and at the last show held in Vilnius, with an audience of 60,000. This farewell performance still holds the all-time record in Lithuania.

After Foje was disbanded, Mamontovas began his solo career and has since been nominated and awarded best solo act in the national music awards. He currently holds 15 Bravo Awards (the Lithuanian equivalent to the Grammy Award) in total, awarded for the best song, best album, best show, and best act of the year. Mamontovas has also written soundtracks for several short films, and music for the theater play Ivanov by Anton Chekhov (directed by Nekrošius) at Teatro Argentina in Rome.

Mamontovas' music had a profound influence in Lithuania. Having acted in videos and small scale movies, Andrius was invited to act a main role in Hamlet, directed by Eimuntas Nekrošius. The play is still on world tour (since 1997) and has been performed over 180 times as of 2006.

Mamontovas' performance was the main act at the festival by the Brandenburg Gate in Berlin on 1 May 2004, celebrating Lithuania's accession to the European Union. He has also appeared in the concerts of Sting, Bryan Adams, and The Sugarcubes. Mamontovas has served as producer and songwriter for fellow artists as well.

Mamontovas initiated a LT United project, intended to represent Lithuania at the Eurovision Song Contest 2006. Their song "We Are The Winners" has achieved much recognition from both members of the recording industry and fellow artists. The band has gone on to record and release other tracks, and have performed in venues of Ireland, Germany, Iceland and Croatia among others.

In 2008, Andrius Mamontovas won the Jin-Jue award at the Shanghai International Film Festival for the best music for film ("Nereikalingi žmonės", 2008).

== Discography ==
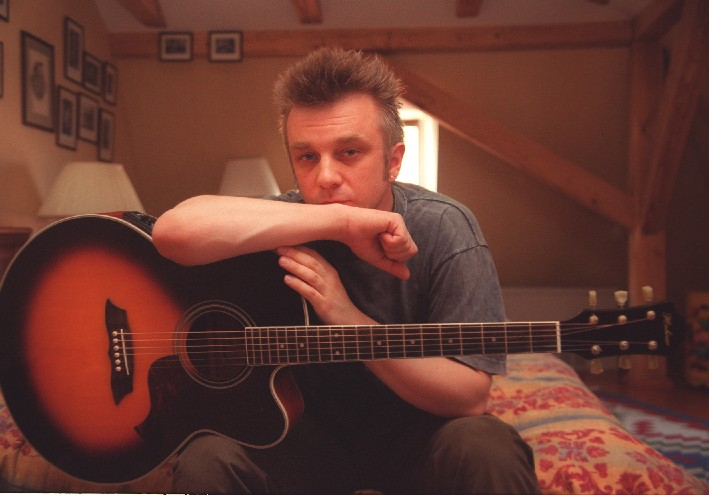
Andrius Mamontovas in 2002

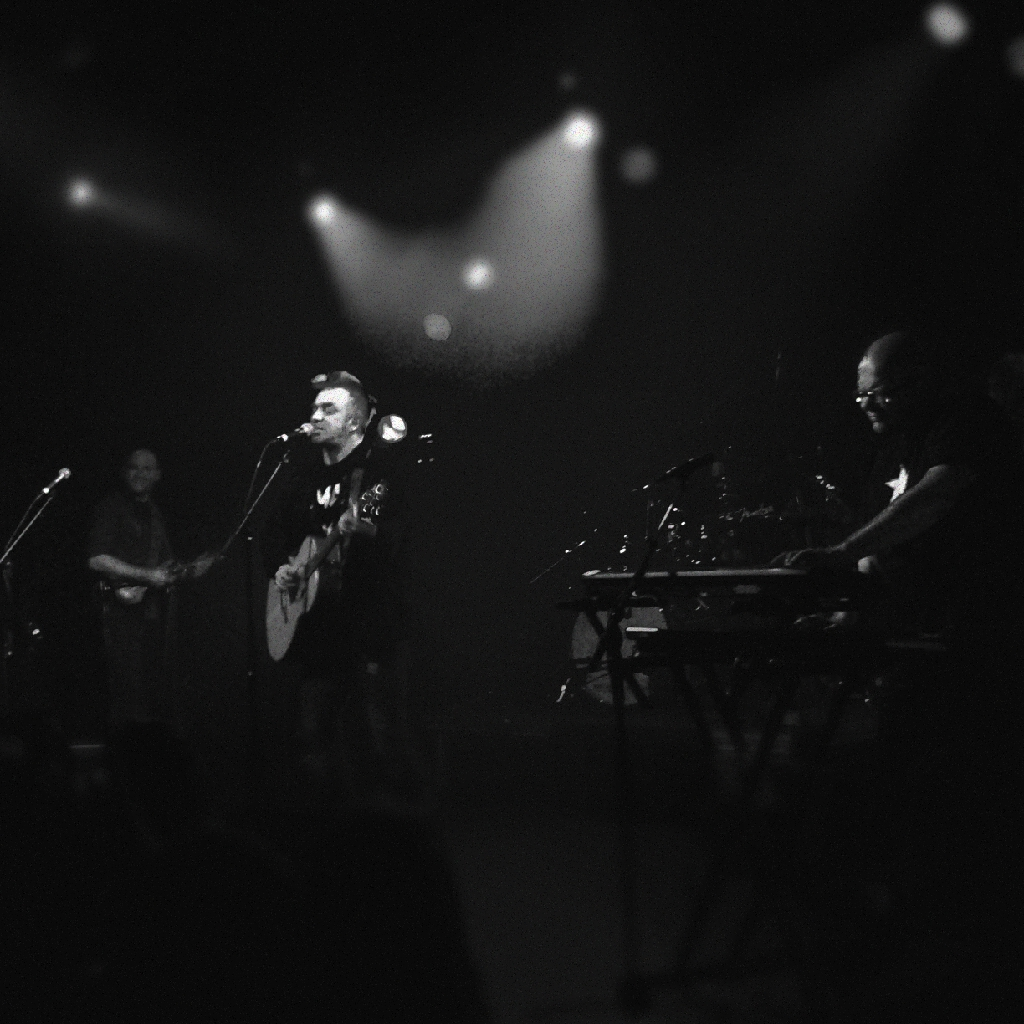
Andrius Mamontovas (left) in 2016

=== Solo albums ===
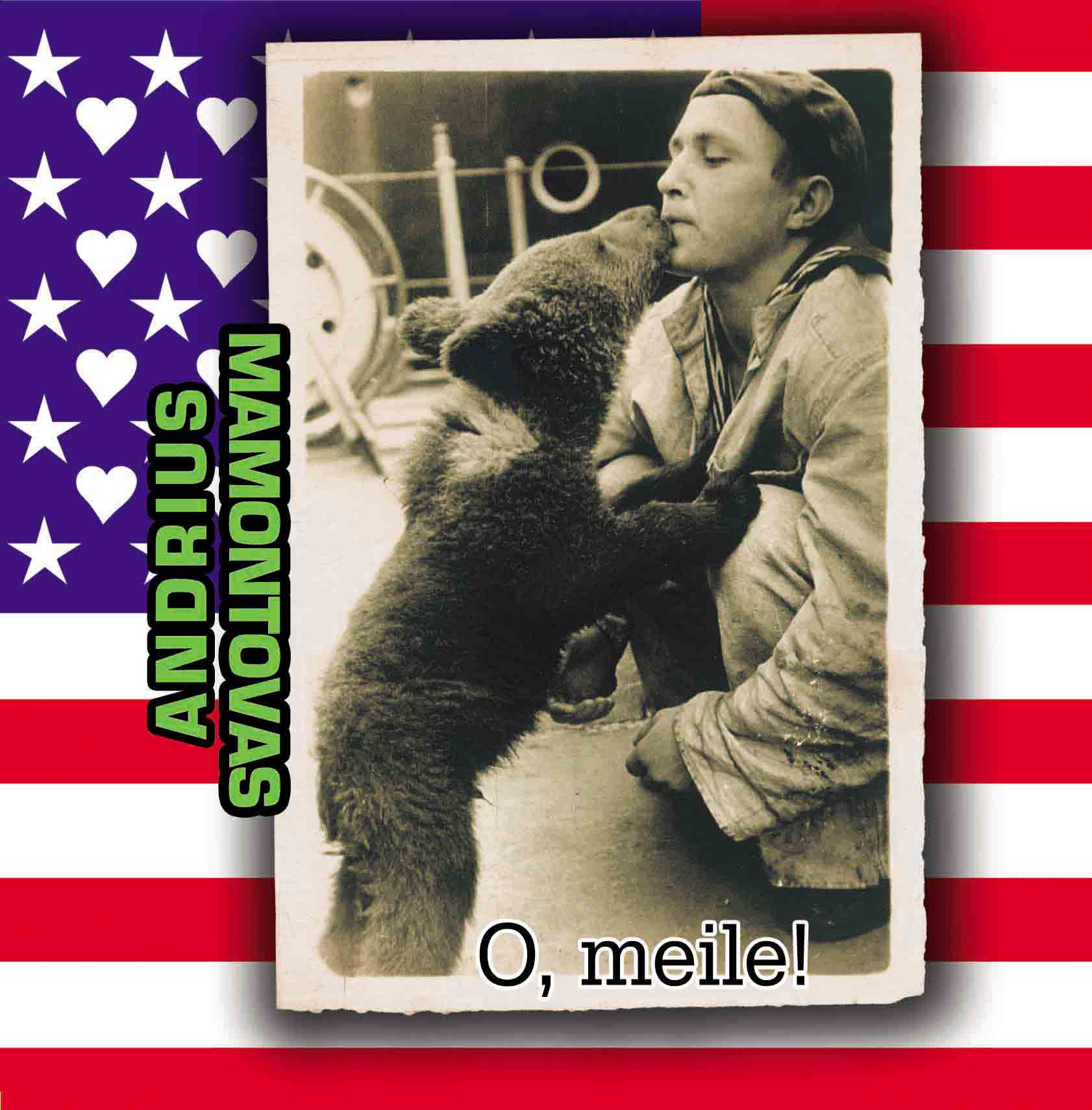
Cover of the 2002 album O, meile!

- Pabėgimas (1995)
- Tranzas (1997)
- Šiaurės naktis. Pusė penkių (1998)
- Mono Arba Stereo (1999)
- Šiaurės Naktis. Pusė Penkių (2000)
- Anapilis (2000)
- Cloudmaker (2000)
- Visi langai žiūri į dangų (2000)
- Cloudmaker. No Reason Why (2001)
- Clubmix.lt (2001)
- O, meile! (2002)
- Beribiam danguje (2003)
- Tadas Blinda (2004)
- Saldi.Juoda.Naktis. (2006)
- Tyla (2006)
- Geltona. Žalia. Raudona (2008)
- Elektroninis dievas (2011)
- Degančios Akys (2015)
- Memories of Something That Never Happened (2017)
- Kibernetiniai Žaislai (2017)
- The Hong Kong Tapes (2018)
- Perlai ir sakuros (2020)

=== Singles ===
- Pabėgimas (1995)
- TV Daina (1998)
- Kregždutės, kregždutės (2003) with Atlanta
- Pavasariniai žiedai (2004)
- We Are The Winners (2006) with LT United
- Kitoks Pasaulis (2017)
