= Els de Schepper =

Belgian actor and comedian

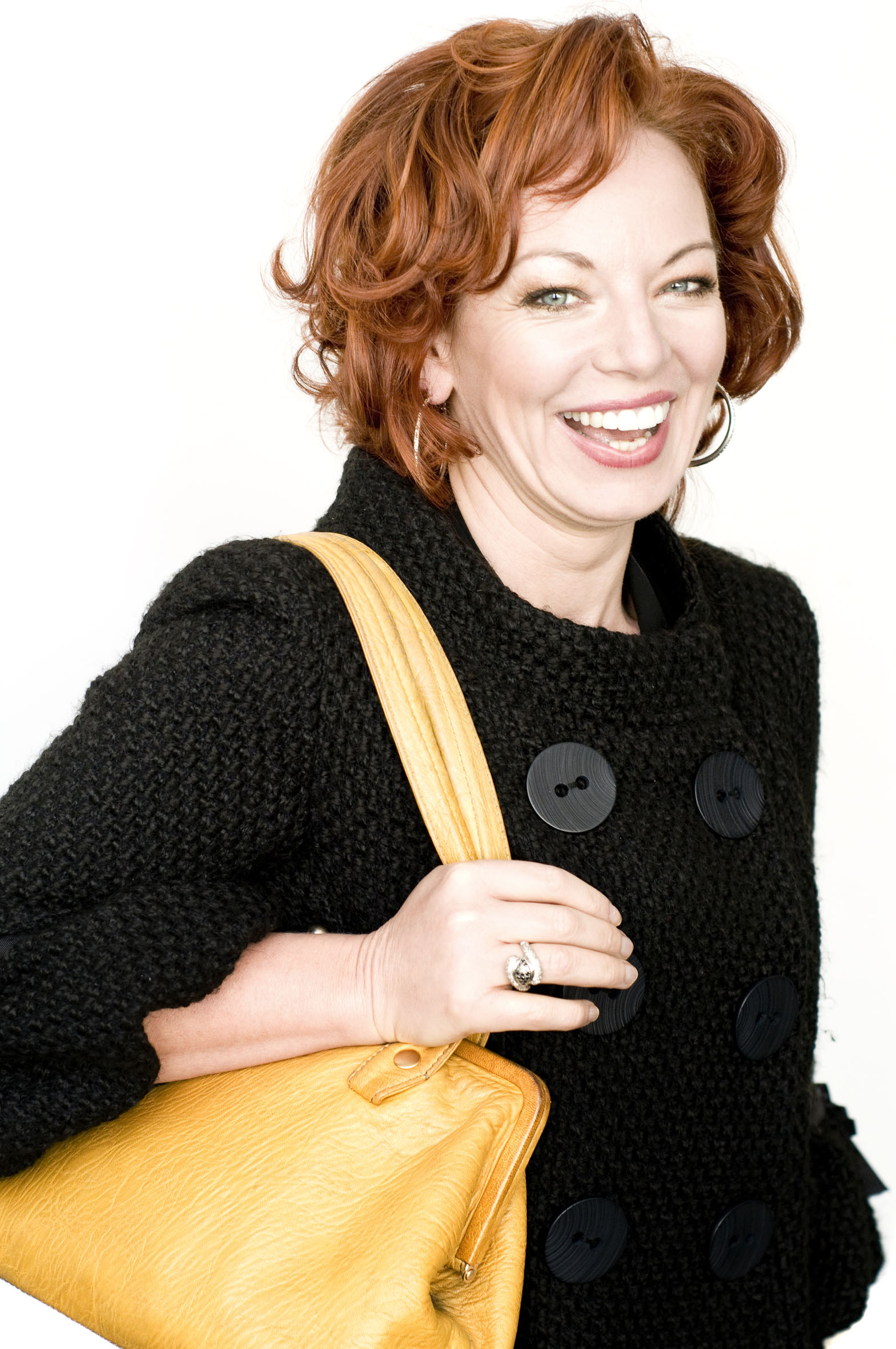
- Born: Els Baziel Germain de Schepper; 5 October 1965 (age 61); Sint-Niklaas, Belgium
- Occupations: Actress; comedian; writer

Els Baziel Germain de Schepper (born 5 October 1965 in Sint-Niklaas) is a Flemish actress, comedian and writer.

== Biography ==
Els de Schepper studied cabaret at the Studio Herman Teirlinck.
She became known to general public through several appearances on vtm: in 1991 her television career started as a panel member of the consumer program "Raar maar waar" and of the popular "Kriebels", and as an actress in the soap opera "Wittekerke" on VTM. She also hosted the game show "Kinderpraat" and after 1995 took charge of the television quiz show "RIR". Since 2001 she was also leading lady of the "De plaatgast".

On 19 May 2023 Els' single 'Unsaid' was released, written by Eurovision legend Serhat and Belgian songwriter Jens Geerts. The single is a tribute to Els' great love Adel, who died unexpectedly in 2018. The message of 'Unsaid' is therefore: 'Don't wait to talk things out.'

== Shows ==
- Konijnen, schoenen en de Schepper (1993)
- Vlaamse Zeep (1995)
- Aaibaarheidsfactor nr. 7 (1997)
- De Witte Negerin (1999)
- Lustobject (2001)
- Puur (2003)
- Intiem (2004)
- Terug Normaal! (2005)
- Supervrouw (2007)
- Els de Schepper Roddelt (2009)
- Niet geschikt als Moeder (2011)
- Feest! (najaar 2013)

== Books ==
- Het heeft zin (2002)
- De ziel die haar naam zelf koos (2004)
- Niet geschikt als moeder (2011)

In autumn 2008, these titles were published as audiobooks too.

== Albums ==
- Vlaamse Zeep
- De witte negerin
- Beauty of it all
- Terug Normaal!
- Supervrouw!
- Ongezouten (2009)
- Unsaid (2023)

== Positions in the Ultratop 50 ==
Single(s) with position in the Flemish Ultratop 50	Date appeared	Date entry	Highest position	Number weeks	Comments
Als Ik Je Morgen Ergens Tegenkom	2006	-	12	11	-
Expeditie Naar Mijn Hart	2006	-	-	-	-
Unsaid	2023	-	-	-	-
