= Portugal in the Eurovision Song Contest 2006 =

- Eurovision Song Contest 2006
- Participating broadcaster: Rádio e Televisão de Portugal (RTP)
- Country: Portugal
- Selection process: Festival da Canção 2006
- Selection date: 11 March 2006

Competing entry
- Song: "Coisas de nada"
- Artist: Nonstop
- Songwriters: José Manuel Afonso; Elvis Veiguinha

Placement
- Semi-final result: Failed to qualify (19th)

Participation chronology

Portugal was represented at the Eurovision Song Contest 2006 with the song "Coisas de nada" written by José Manuel Afonso and Elvis Veiguinha, and performed by the group Nonstop. The Portuguese participating broadcaster, Rádio e Televisão de Portugal (RTP), organised the national final Festival da Canção 2006 in order to select its entry for the contest. The competition took place on 11 March 2006 where "Coisas de nada" performed by Nonstop emerged as the winner after tying for first place following the combination of votes from five-member jury panel and a public televote—the tie was decided in Nonstop's favour after their song scored the highest with the jury.

Portugal competed in the semi-final of the Eurovision Song Contest which took place on 18 May 2006. Performing during the show in position 19, "Coisas de nada" was not announced among the top 10 entries of the semi-final and therefore did not qualify to compete in the final. It was later revealed that Portugal placed nineteenth out of the 22 participating countries in the semi-final with 26 points.

== Background ==
Prior to the 2006 contest, Radiotelevisão Portuguesa (RTP) until 2003, and Rádio e Televisão de Portugal (RTP) since 2004, had participated in the Eurovision Song Contest representing Portugal thirty-nine times since their first entry in 1964. Their highest placing in the contest was sixth, achieved in 1996 with the song "O meu coração não tem cor" performed by Lúcia Moniz. Following the introduction of semi-finals for the 2004 contest, they had, to this point, yet to feature in a final. Their least successful result has been last place, which they have achieved on three occasions, most recently in 1997 with the song "Antes do adeus" performed by Célia Lawson. The Portuguese entry has also received nul points on two occasions; in 1964 and 1997. In 2005, "Amar" performed by 2B failed to qualify to the final.

As part of its duties as participating broadcaster, RTP organises the selection of its entry in the Eurovision Song Contest and broadcasts the event in the country. The broadcaster confirmed its participation in the 2006 contest on 21 December 2005. The broadcaster has traditionally selected its entry for the contest via the music competition Festival da Canção, with exceptions in 1988 and 2005 when the entries were internally selected. On 10 January 2006, the broadcaster revealed details regarding its selection procedure and announced the organization of Festival da Canção 2006 in order to select the 2006 entry.

== Before Eurovision ==
=== Festival da Canção 2006 ===
The logo of Festival da Canção 2006

Festival da Canção 2006 was the 42nd edition of Festival da Canção organised by RTP to select its entry for the Eurovision Song Contest 2006. Ten entries competed in the competition which took place on 11 March 2006 at the Congress Centre in Lisbon. The show was hosted by Helena Coelho, Daniel Oliveira, Isabel Angelino, Jorge Gabriel, Helena Ramos and Eládio Clímaco and broadcast on RTP1 and RTP Internacional.

==== Competing entries ====
Five producers were invited by RTP for the competition: Elvis Veiguinha, José Marinho, Luís Oliveira, Ramón Galarza and Renato Júnior. Each producer worked in coordination with two composers and performers on their songs which were required to be created and submitted in Portuguese (with exceptions for a small part of the song which could be in any other language). The competing artists were revealed on 16 February 2006.

Artist	Song	Songwriter(s)	Producer
Beto	"O amor é uma fonte"	José Marinho, Jose Jorge Letria	José Marinho
Bruno Nicolau	"Um dia direi"	Gustavo Teixeira	Renato Júnior
Cuca	"As minhas guitarras"	Ramón Galarza, Paulo Abel Lima	Ramón Galarza
Lara Afonso	"Alma nova"	Luís Oliveira, António Avelar Pinho	Luís Oliveira
Madison Lucia	"Na noite és tu e eu"	Douglas Temmo, José Manuel Afonso, Elvis Veiguinha, Slu Fernandes	Elvis Veiguinha
Mariafolia	"Bem mais além"	José Marinho, António Avelar Pinho	José Marinho
Natalie Insoandé	"Durmo com pedras na cama"	Luís Oliveira, António Avelar Pinho	Luís Oliveira
Nonstop	"Coisas de nada"	José Manuel Afonso, Elvis Veiguinha	Elvis Veiguinha
Ricardo Moraes	"Nunca mais te digo adeus"	Ricardo Landum	Ramón Galarza
Vânia de Oliveira	"Sei quem sou (Portugal)"	Carlos Coincas, José Liaça	Renato Júnior

==== Final ====
The final took place on 11 March 2006. Ten entries competed and the winner, "Coisas de nada" performed by Nonstop, was selected based on the 50/50 combination of votes of a jury panel and a public televote. The jury that voted consisted of Filipe La Féria, Simone de Oliveira, Tozé Brito, Fátima Lopes and João Gobern. In addition to the performances of the competing entries, Alexandra Valentim, Filipe Santos, Pedro Mimoso, Rui Drumond (who represented Portugal in 2005 as a member of 2B), and Teresa Radamanto performed as the interval acts. Vânia de Oliveira and Nonstop were both tied at 22 points each but since Nonstop received the most points from the jury they were declared the winners.

Final – 11 March 2006
R/O	Artist	Song	Jury	Televote	Total	Place
1	Bruno Nicolau	"Um dia direi"	5	3	8	6
2	Lara Afonso	"Alma nova"	6	2	8	5
3	Madison Lucia	"Na noite és tu e eu"	4	1	5	10
4	Mariafolia	"Bem mais além"	1	7	8	9
5	Ricardo Moraes	"Nunca mais te digo adeus"	3	5	8	7
6	Vânia de Oliveira	"Sei quem sou (Portugal)"	10	12	22	2
7	Natalie Insoandé	"Durmo com pedras na cama"	8	4	12	4
8	Nonstop	"Coisas de nada"	12	10	22	1
9	Beto	"O amor é uma fonte"	2	6	8	8
10	Cuca	"As minhas guitarras"	7	8	15	3

Detailed Jury Votes
R/O	Song	F. La Féria	S. de Oliveira	T. Brito	F. Lopes	J. Gobern	Total	Points
1	"Um dia direi"	5	4	4	3	4	20	5
2	"Alma nova"	6	5	6	6	5	28	6
3	"Na noite és tu e eu"	4	2	3	2	6	17	4
4	"Bem mais além"	1	1	7	1	1	11	1
5	"Nunca mais te digo adeus"	2	6	1	4	3	16	3
6	"Sei quem sou (Portugal)"	8	12	12	8	10	50	10
7	"Durmo com pedras na cama"	10	8	10	10	8	46	8
8	"Coisas de nada"	12	10	8	12	12	54	12
9	"O amor é uma fonte"	3	3	2	5	2	15	2
10	"As minhas guitarras"	7	7	5	7	7	33	7

=== Controversy ===
The victory of Nonstop at Festival da Canção 2006 was contested by the public which preferred runner-up Vânia de Oliveira. Several online petitions were launched in favour of de Oliveira as the Portuguese entrant, while composer Carlos Coincas criticised RTP's failed efforts to revive the competition solely due to the controversial voting system and the broadcaster's selection of the jury members.

== At Eurovision ==
According to Eurovision rules, all nations with the exceptions of the host country, the "Big Four" (France, Germany, Spain and the United Kingdom), and the ten highest placed finishers in the 2005 contest are required to qualify from the semi-final on 18 May 2006 in order to compete for the final on 20 May 2006; the top ten countries from the semi-final progress to the final. On 21 March 2006, a special allocation draw was held which determined the running order for the semi-final and Portugal was set to perform in position 19, following the entry from Lithuania and before the entry from Sweden. At the end of the show, Portugal was not announced among the top 10 entries in the semi-final and therefore failed to qualify to compete in the final. It was later revealed that Portugal placed nineteen in the semi-final, receiving a total of 26 points.

In Portugal, the two shows were broadcast on RTP1 and RTP Internacional with commentary by Eládio Clímaco. RTO appointed Cristina Alves as its spokesperson to announce the Portuguese votes during the final.

=== Voting ===
Below is a breakdown of points awarded to Portugal and awarded by Portugal in the semi-final and grand final of the contest. The nation awarded its 12 points to Sweden in the semi-final and to Ukraine in the final of the contest.

==== Points awarded to Portugal ====
Points awarded to Portugal (Semi-final)
Score	Country
12 points	Andorra
10 points	
8 points	
7 points	France; Switzerland
6 points	
5 points	
4 points	
3 points	
2 points	
1 point	

==== Points awarded by Portugal ====
Points awarded by Portugal (Semi-final)
Score	Country
12 points	Sweden
10 points	Ukraine
8 points	Finland
7 points	Russia
6 points	Bosnia and Herzegovina
5 points	Lithuania
4 points	Ireland
3 points	Iceland
2 points	Belgium
1 point	Bulgaria

Points awarded by Portugal (Final)
Score	Country
12 points	Ukraine
10 points	Romania
8 points	Sweden
7 points	Russia
6 points	Finland
5 points	Ireland
4 points	Lithuania
3 points	Moldova
2 points	Bosnia and Herzegovina
1 point	Switzerland
