= Ireland in the Eurovision Song Contest 2006 =

- Eurovision Song Contest 2006
- Participating broadcaster: Radio Telefís Éireann (RTÉ)
- Country: Ireland
- Selection process: Artist: Internal selection Song: Eurosong 2006
- Selection date: Artist: 14 November 2005; Song: 17 February 2006

Competing entry
- Song: "Every Song Is a Cry for Love"
- Artist: Brian Kennedy
- Songwriters: Brian Kennedy

Placement
- Semi-final result: Qualified (9th, 79 points)
- Final result: 10th, 93 points

Participation chronology

Ireland was represented at the Eurovision Song Contest 2006 with the song "Every Song Is a Cry for Love" written and performed by Brian Kennedy. The Irish participating broadcaster, Radio Telefís Éireann (RTÉ), selected its entry through the national final Eurosong 2006, after having previously selected the performer internally. Three songs faced a public televote, ultimately resulting in the selection of "Every Song Is a Cry for Love" as the Irish entry.

Ireland competed in the semi-final of the Eurovision Song Contest which took place on 18 May 2006. Performing during the show in position 8, "Every Song Is a Cry for Love" was announced among the top 10 entries of the semi-final and therefore qualified to compete in the final on 20 May. It was later revealed that Ireland placed ninth out of the 23 participating countries in the semi-final with 79 points. In the final, Ireland performed in position 21 and placed tenth out of the 24 participating countries, scoring 93 points.

== Background ==
Prior to the 2006 Contest, Radio Éireann (RÉ) until 1966, and Radio Telefís Éireann (RTÉ) since 1967, had participated in the Eurovision Song Contest representing Ireland thirty-nine times since RÉ's first entry in 1965. They have won the contest a record seven times in total. Their first win came in 1970, with "All Kinds of Everything" performed by Dana. Ireland holds the record for being the only country to win the contest three times in a row (in 1992, 1993, and 1994), as well as having the only three-time winner (Johnny Logan, who won in 1980 as a singer, 1987 as a singer-songwriter, and again in 1992 as a songwriter). In 2005, "Love?" performed by Donna and Joe, failed to qualify to the final and achieved Ireland's lowest position in the contest.

As part of its duties as participating broadcaster, RTÉ organises the selection of its entry in the Eurovision Song Contest and broadcasts the event in the country. The broadcaster confirmed its intentions to participate at the 2006 contest on 17 July 2005. From 2003 to 2005, RTÉ had set up the talent contest You're a Star to choose both the song and performer to compete at Eurovision. For the 2006 contest, the broadcaster announced alongside its confirmation that You're a Star would not be used to choose its entry, with executive producer of You're a Star Larry Bass stating that the contest "hasn't delivered in terms of what the Eurovision Song Contest has wanted". RTÉ ultimately opted to internally select the artist with the song being chosen in a televised competition.

== Before Eurovision ==
=== Artist selection ===
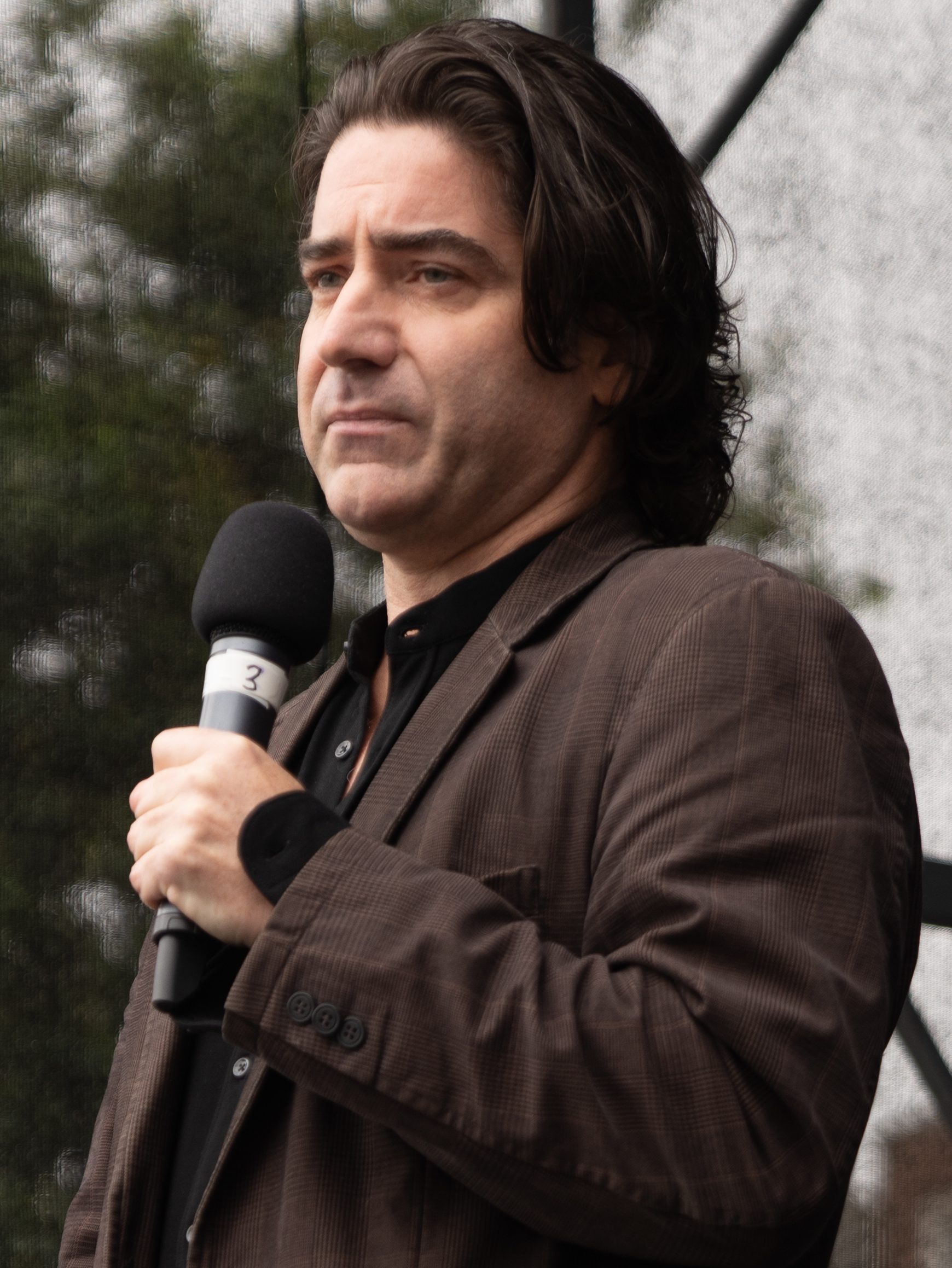
Brian Kennedy was internally selected to represent Ireland in 2006

On 14 November 2005, RTÉ announced that they had internally selected Brian Kennedy as its representative in the Eurovision Song Contest 2006. Along with this announcement, the broadcaster also announced that it would held a national final to select the song with he would compete.

=== Eurosong 2006 ===
On 14 November 2005, RTÉ opened a submission period where composers were able to submit their songs for the competition until the deadline on 17 December 2005, which was later extended to 27 January 2006. At the closing of the deadline, over 1,000 songs were received. The competing songs were selected through two phases involving two separate three-member jury panels appointed by RTÉ; the first phase involved the first jury reviewing all of the submissions and shortlisting over 40 songs, while the second phase involved the second jury selecting the four finalist songs. The members of the first jury consisted of RTÉ representatives including Assistant Commissioning Entertainment Editor Julian Vignoles, while the members of the second jury consisted of writers Brendan Graham and Shay Healy as well as singer-songwriter Paul Brady. The finalist songs were announced on 11 February 2006, one of them, "Strong Enough" written by Barry Walsh, which was later disqualified on 13 February as it had been previously published as a B-side, making it ineligible for the Eurovision Song Contest.

RTÉ held the national final, Eurosong 2006, on 17 February 2006 at its Studio 4 in Dublin, hosted by Pat Kenny and broadcast on RTÉ One as well as online via the broadcaster's official website rte.ie during a special edition of The Late Late Show. The show also featured guest performances from former contestant Dickie Rock as well as former contest winners Linda Martin, Niamh Kavanagh, Paul Harrington, and Charlie McGettigan, and commentary from a panel that consisted of Martin, commentator Marty Whelan and music manager Louis Walsh. All three competing songs were performed by Brian Kennedy and following a public televote, "Every Song Is a Cry for Love" was selected as the winning song. An audience vote was also held during the show, which "Every Song Is a Cry for Love" won with 47% of the votes. The national final was watched by 781,000 viewers in Ireland, and over 200,000 televotes were cast. "Every Song Is a Cry for Love" was later released on 21 April 2006, and eventually peaked at Number 4 on the Irish Singles Chart.

Final – 17 February 2006
| R/O | Song | Songwriter | Place |
|---|---|---|---|
| 1 | "The Greatest Song of All" | Jimmy MacCarthy | —N/a |
| 2 | "All Over the World" | Don Mescall | —N/a |
| 3 | "Every Song Is a Cry for Love" | Brian Kennedy | 1 |

=== Controversy ===
The selection of "Every Song Is a Cry for Love", written by Brian Kennedy himself, as the Irish entry provoked controversy from Irish songwriters. John Waters, who submitted three songs to RTÉ which were all rejected, alleged that extension of the deadline was made to accommodate Kennedy's submission. Criticism was also made by IMRO publisher Johnny Lappin, who claimed that RTÉ did not have sufficient time to make fair judgements on all the submitted songs, failed to clarify in advance the role of the selection panel and overrode their own rules by approaching music publishers to submit songs. Before the public were allowed to vote, the panellists unanimously tipped "Every Song Is a Cry for Love" to win, while a prize of a car was offered to the winner of a draw that was only open to those who voted for the winning song. This led to allegations from Lappin that the broadcaster was biased in favour of Kennedy's song, as it "might prejudice the viewers into voting for the song most likely to win".

In a press conference following the national final, RTÉ Commissioning Entertainment Editor Kevin Linehan stated that the deadline extension was made due to "a lack of good entries", while RTÉ Senior Press and Publicity Officer Sharon Brady responded to Lappin that "every single song was listened to" since before late December, and that the televoting was monitored and approved by an independent observer. Brady also stated that "nobody was approached [by the broadcaster]" and that they would be "looking at how [they] can improve this process of getting the best representation for Ireland in the Eurovision."

== At Eurovision ==
According to Eurovision rules, all nations with the exceptions of the host country, the "Big Four" (France, Germany, Spain and the United Kingdom) and the ten highest placed finishers in the 2005 contest are required to qualify from the semi-final in order to compete for the final; the top ten countries from the semi-final progress to the final. On 21 March 2006, a special allocation draw was held which determined the running order for the semi-final, to be held on 18 May 2006, and the final, to be held on 20 May 2006. Ireland was drawn to perform in position 8, following the entry from Belgium and before the entry from Cyprus.

In Ireland, the semi-final and the final were broadcast on RTÉ One with commentary by Marty Whelan. The two shows were also broadcast via radio on RTÉ Radio 1 with commentary by Larry Gogan. RTÉ appointed Eimear Quinn (who won Eurovision for Ireland in 1996) as its spokesperson to announce the Irish votes during the final.

=== Semi-final ===
Brian Kennedy took part in technical rehearsals on 11 and 13 May, followed by dress rehearsals on 17 and 18 May. The Irish performance, which was also the 1000th song performed in Eurovision history, featured Brian Kennedy dressed in a black suit and joined on stage by four backing vocalists, three of them located at the right side of the stage with the remaining one located at the left side of the stage and also played the guitar: Calum McColl, Fran King, Paula Gilbert and Una Healy.

At the end of the show, Ireland was announced as having finished in the top 10 and consequently qualifying for the grand final. It was later revealed that Ireland placed ninth in the semi-final, receiving a total of 79 points.

=== Final ===
Shortly after the semi-final, a winners' press conference was held for the ten qualifying countries. As part of this press conference, the qualifying artists took part in a draw to determine the running order for the final and Ireland was drawn to perform in position 21, following the entry from Croatia and before the entry from Sweden.

Brian Kennedy once again took part in dress rehearsals on 19 and 20 May before the final. Brian Kennedy performed a repeat of his semi-final performance during the final on 20 May. Ireland placed tenth in the final, scoring 93 points.

=== Voting ===
Below is a breakdown of points awarded to Ireland and awarded by Ireland in the semi-final and grand final of the contest. The nation awarded its 12 points to Lithuania in the semi-final and the final of the contest.

==== Points awarded to Ireland ====
Points awarded to Ireland (Semi-final)
| Score | Country |
|---|---|
| 12 points | |
| 10 points | |
| 8 points | United Kingdom |
| 7 points | Monaco |
| 6 points | Estonia; Malta; Norway |
| 5 points | Denmark; Israel |
| 4 points | Finland; Latvia; Lithuania; Portugal |
| 3 points | Belgium; Netherlands; Slovenia |
| 2 points | Iceland; Poland; Switzerland |
| 1 point | Albania; Moldova; Russia; Serbia and Montenegro; Sweden |

Points awarded to Ireland (Final)
| Score | Country |
|---|---|
| 12 points | |
| 10 points | Monaco |
| 8 points | United Kingdom |
| 7 points | Norway |
| 6 points | Estonia; Lithuania |
| 5 points | Denmark; Portugal; Sweden |
| 4 points | Andorra; Finland; Germany; Latvia; Malta; Netherlands |
| 3 points | Armenia; Switzerland |
| 2 points | Croatia; Poland; Romania; Ukraine |
| 1 point | France; Iceland; Slovenia |

==== Points awarded by Ireland ====
Points awarded by Ireland (Semi-final)
| Score | Country |
|---|---|
| 12 points | Lithuania |
| 10 points | Finland |
| 8 points | Sweden |
| 7 points | Poland |
| 6 points | Bosnia and Herzegovina |
| 5 points | Belgium |
| 4 points | Russia |
| 3 points | Ukraine |
| 2 points | Iceland |
| 1 point | Estonia |

Points awarded by Ireland (Final)
| Score | Country |
|---|---|
| 12 points | Lithuania |
| 10 points | Finland |
| 8 points | United Kingdom |
| 7 points | Sweden |
| 6 points | Romania |
| 5 points | Russia |
| 4 points | Latvia |
| 3 points | Germany |
| 2 points | Bosnia and Herzegovina |
| 1 point | Ukraine |
