= LT United =

Lithuanian music group

LT United were a Lithuanian music group created in 2006 for the sole purpose of representing Lithuania in the Eurovision Song Contest 2006. The group entered the Lithuanian pre-selection event with the song "We Are the Winners", winning with almost twice as many votes as the runners-up, and finished 6th in the Eurovision Song Contest final with 162 points.

== History ==
LT United were created in early 2006 after the well-known Lithuanian rock musician Andrius Mamontovas decided it would be a good idea to enter the Eurovision Song Contest. The group consisted of six individuals who were already well known in Lithuania, with all six having some form of musical or television background. Along with Mamontovas, the other members were Marijonas Mikutavičius, Viktoras Diawara, Saulius Urbonavičius, Arnoldas Lukošius, and Eimantas Belickas. Before joining LT United, Diawara had already represented Lithuania in the contest, finishing 13th in 2001 (see Eurovision Song Contest 2001) as part of Skamp. The group were described by Mamontovas on LT United's official website as "the musical equivalent of [a] national basketball team".

The group entered the Lithuanian pre-selection contest, dominating the scoring and receiving 32,669 points - almost double that of the second-placed Inculto. After performing the song, the Lithuanian President Valdas Adamkus invited the group to perform at Lithuania's Independence Day. The group also became the Lithuanian ambassadors for the United Nations' "Time to Help the Others" world development programme.

The music video for the song was released for public viewing on 23 March 2006 and was directed by Donatas Ulvydas. The video consisted of clips from their pre-selection performance, along with archive footage of the six members. The press release that accompanied the video stated that the use of archive material was to "prove the experience of each LT United member". The video received a large amount of airplay in Lithuania from March until the time of the contest in late May.

Prior to the Eurovision Song Contest semi-finals, LT United refused to perform the song, deciding to wait until the semi-final itself (although a rehearsal performance was released on their official website just before it). The group also contacted radio stations across Europe to request the song be removed from playlists until 22 May (the day after the final). Despite this, the song became well known among those following the contest, with some annoyed at the lyrics (the statement "We are the winners, of Eurovision" appears 15 times). Some felt the song was egotistical, although most considered the song tongue-in-cheek. When they appeared in the semi-final, there was some booing before and after their performance.

Despite that, their stage act (including Arnoldas Lukošius' manic dancing and Saulius Urbonavičius singing into a megaphone) helped the song to score 163 points, which proved to be enough to finish 5th in the semi-final. When their qualification was announced, loud boos were heard from the crowd.

Their final performance did not differ much from that in the semi-final, and despite (less prominent) booing from the crowd present in Athens, LT United managed to finish 6th with 162 points (with big points from the English-speaking countries of Ireland and the United Kingdom, along with their Baltic neighbours of Latvia and Estonia, as well as from Iceland). This is Lithuania's best contest finish to date (beating their aforementioned 2001 entrants Skamp by seven places). During the final, BBC commentator Terry Wogan likened Lukošius to the British comedian Harry Hill. Contest winners Lordi jokingly quoted the song's title in the post-final press conference.

After the contest, LT United released "We Are the Winners" as a single (on the M.P.3 label), with a World Cup 2006 version of the song also included on the release despite Lithuania having never qualified for the World Cup. In two weeks, the single sold around 3,000 copies in Lithuania and thus went gold. Eventually, the single became platinum after selling 5,000 copies in Lithuania. It reached No. 14 on the Finnish singles chart, where it was released by Magnum Music.

Robbie Williams performed the song at a concert in the Belgian capital Brussels, after he made jokes about the contest and their song in particular.

On 11 March 2022, the group reunited on an annual awards ceremony Lietuvos Garbė, where they performed a remix of "We Are the Winners", titled "You Are the Winners, Ukraina", in support of Ukraine during the 2022 Russian invasion of Ukraine.

Awards and achievements
Preceded by Laura and the Lovers with "Little by Little"	Lithuania in the Eurovision Song Contest; 2006	Succeeded by 4Fun with "Love or Leave"
