= Yasmine (singer) =

Belgian singer and presenter

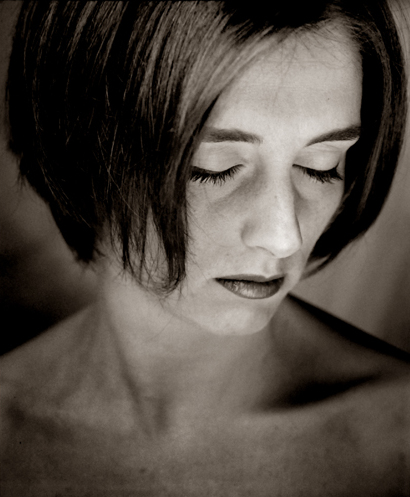

Background information
- Born: Hilde Rens; 3 March 1972; Antwerp, Belgium
- Died: 25 June 2009 (aged 37) Kontich, Belgium
- Genres: Pop; folk
- Occupations: Singer; television presenter
- Years active: 1990–2009
- Label: EMI

Hilde Rens (3 March 1972 – 25 June 2009), better known by her stage name Yasmine, was a Belgian singer, presenter and television personality.

== Career ==
=== Music ===
Rens became known as a singer during the 1980s. At the age of 17, Yasmine made her television debut in 1989 as a contestant on a Flemish television talent show, performing a rendition of "Don't Cry for Me Argentina" as Julie Covington.

Two years later, she earned a record deal, releasing her first single, "Wie Denk Jij Wel Dat Je Bent" and her first album, Mooi zo in the same year. She went on to record another five mainstream pop albums before releasing Vandaag (Het morgen van gisteren) in 2004, a critically lauded CD of Leonard Cohen songs translated into Dutch.

Her last album, Licht Ontvlambaar, was released in 2006.

=== Broadcasting ===
Up until her death, Yasmine was a regular on the VRT's main television station, één, where she was an in-vision continuity announcer and a presenter for various entertainment shows including De Rode Loper, Memento and Zo is er maar één.

Prior to joining the VRT, she presented music programmes and was part of the promotion team for commercial station VTM during the 1990s and was one of the launch VJs for TMF Flanders. She was also a presenter for two VRT radio stations - Studio Brussel and the now-defunct pop station Donna.

== Personal life and death ==
Rens came out as a lesbian in 1996, becoming an established LGBT icon for Flemish and Dutch youth.

Yasmine further positioned herself as a leading LGBT icon by marrying television personality Marianne Dupon (winner of the reality TV show De Mol) in 2003, following a 2-year relationship. On 9 March 2007, Dupon gave birth to a daughter named Ella-Louise.

The couple divorced in April 2009. On 25 June 2009, Yasmine's body was found near her sister's home in Kontich where she had hanged herself from a tree - her suicide reportedly followed a severe depression allegedly inflicted by her split with Dupon.

== Discography ==
=== Albums ===
- 1991: Mooi Zo
- 1993: Als Jij Dat Wil
- 1995: Portfolio
- 1997: Prêt-a-Porter
- 1999: Blauw
- 2001: Yasmine
- 2004: Vandaag, Het Morgen Van Gisteren
- 2006: Licht Ontvlambaar
