= United Kingdom in the Eurovision Song Contest 2006 =

- Eurovision Song Contest 2006
- Participating broadcaster: British Broadcasting Corporation (BBC)
- Country: United Kingdom
- Selection process: Eurovision: Making Your Mind Up 2006
- Selection date: 4 March 2006

Competing entry
- Song: "Teenage Life"
- Artist: Daz Sampson
- Songwriters: Daz Sampson; John Matthews

Placement
- Final result: 19th, 25 points

Participation chronology

The United Kingdom was represented at the Eurovision Song Contest 2006 with the song "Teenage Life", written by Daz Sampson and John Matthews, and performed by Sampson himself. The British participating broadcaster, the British Broadcasting Corporation (BBC), organised a public selection process to determine its entry for the contest, Eurovision: Making Your Mind Up 2006. Six acts competed in the national final and the winner was selected entirely through a public vote.

As a member of the "Big Four", the United Kingdom automatically qualified to compete in the final of the Eurovision Song Contest. Performing in position 15, the United Kingdom placed 19th out of the 24 participating countries with 25 points.

== Background ==
Prior to the 2006 contest, the British Broadcasting Corporation (BBC) had participated in the Eurovision Song Contest representing the United Kingdom forty-eight times. Thus far, it has won the contest five times: in 1967 with the song "Puppet on a String" performed by Sandie Shaw, in 1969 with the song "Boom Bang-a-Bang" performed by Lulu, in 1976 with "Save Your Kisses for Me" performed by Brotherhood of Man, in 1981 with the song "Making Your Mind Up" performed by Bucks Fizz, and in 1997 with the song "Love Shine a Light" performed by Katrina and the Waves. To this point, the nation is noted for having finished as the runner-up in a record fifteen contests. Up to and including 1998, it had only twice finished outside the top 10, in 1978 and in 1987. Since 1999, the year in which the rule was abandoned that songs must be performed in one of the official languages of the country participating, it has had less success, thus far only finishing within the top ten once: in 2002 with the song "Come Back" performed by Jessica Garlick. In 2005, the song "Touch My Fire" performed by Javine finished in twenty-second place out of twenty-four competing entries.

As part of its duties as participating broadcaster, the BBC organises the selection of its entry in the Eurovision Song Contest and broadcasts the event in the country. The broadcaster announced that it would participate in the 2006 contest on 29 November 2005. The BBC has traditionally organised a national final featuring a competition among several artists and songs to choose its entry for Eurovision. For its 2006 entry, the broadcaster announced that a national final involving a public vote would be held to select its entry.

== Before Eurovision ==
=== Eurovision: Making Your Mind Up 2006 ===
Eurovision: Making Your Mind Up 2006 was the national final developed by the BBC in order to select its entry for the Eurovision Song Contest 2006. Six acts competed in a televised show on 4 March 2006 held at the BBC Television Centre in London and hosted by Terry Wogan and Natasha Kaplinsky. The winner was selected entirely through a public vote. The show was broadcast on BBC One. The first part of the national final was watched by 2.8 million viewers in the United Kingdom, while the second part was watched by 6.1 million viewers in the United Kingdom.

==== Competing entries ====
The BBC collaborated with Magic Radio programme director and Fame Academy judge, Richard Park, to select six finalists to compete in the national final. Entries were provided to Park and the BBC by music industry experts including writers and producers, while an additional song, "I Wanna Man" written by Toby Jarvis, was provided by BBC Radio 2 which ran the songwriting competition Search for a Song. The six competing songs for the national final were announced during a press conference on 16 February 2006.

Artist	Song	Songwriter(s)
Antony Costa	"It's a Beautiful Thing"	John McLaughlin; Michael Daley; Stanley Andrew; Alison Pearce
City Chix	"All About You"	Wayne Hector; Deni Lew; Pete Glenister
Daz Sampson	"Teenage Life"	Daz Sampson; John Matthews
Four Story	"Hand on My Heart"	Roachie; Andy Wright
Goran Kay	"Play Your Game"	Goran Kay; Hugo de Chaire
Kym Marsh	"Whisper to Me"	Danny Orton; Melissa Pierce

==== Final ====
Six acts competed in the televised final on 4 March 2006. In addition to their performances, the guest performer was previous Eurovision Song Contest winner Helena Paparizou, who won Eurovision for Greece in 2005 with the song "My Number One".

A panel of experts provided feedback regarding the songs during the show. The panel consisted of Kelly Osbourne (singer, actress, model and television personality), Jonathan Ross (television and radio presenter, actor, comedian and producer), Fearne Cotton (television and radio presenter) and Bruno Tonioli (choreographer, dancer and television personality). A public vote consisting of televoting and online voting selected the winner. A public vote consisting of televoting via phone and SMS as well as online voting selected the winner. Televotes cast via landline phones were divided into seven regions in the United Kingdom with each region alongside the results of the online vote awarding points as follows: 2, 4, 6, 8 and 12 points. Televotes cast via mobile phones and SMS were also converted to points and awarded based on the percentage each song achieved. For example, if a song gained 10% of the mobile and SMS votes, then that entry would be awarded 10 points. The spokespersons for the online and mobile/SMS votes were Javine Hylton and Helena Paparizou, respectively. After all points were combined, "Teenage Life" performed by Daz Sampson was the winner.

R/O	Artist	Song	Televote		Online vote	Total	Place
R/O	Artist	Song	Landline	Mobile	Online vote	Total	Place
1	Goran Kay	"Play Your Game"	6	6	2	14	6
2	Kym Marsh	"Whisper to Me"	40	9	4	53	4
3	Daz Sampson	"Teenage Life"	72	37	12	121	1
4	City Chix	"All About You"	32	17	6	55	3
5	Four Story	"Hand on My Heart"	12	5	0	17	5
6	Antony Costa	"It's a Beautiful Thing"	62	26	8	96	2

Detailed Regional Televoting Results
R/O	Song	Northern Ireland	Northern England	Scotland	Midlands	South West England	Wales	South East England	Total
1	"Play Your Game"			2	2		2		6
2	"Whisper to Me"	6	6	4	6	6	6	6	40
3	"Teenage Life"	12	8	8	12	8	12	12	72
4	"All About You	4	4	12	4	4		4	32
5	"Hand on My Heart"	2	2			2	4	2	12
6	"It's a Beautiful Thing"	8	12	6	8	12	8	8	62
Spokespersons
Northern Ireland – Roy Walker; Northern England – Kelli Young; Scotland – Michelle McManus; Wales – Maggot; South West England – Simon Grant; Midlands – Rustie Lee; South East England – Alistair Appleton

===== 12 points =====
N.	Song	Regions giving 12 points
4	"Teenage Life"	Northern England, Midlands, South West England, Wales
2	"It's a Beautiful Thing"	Northern Ireland, South East England
1	"All About You"	Scotland

=== Controversy ===
Prior to the national final, Eurovision news website Oikotimes claimed that the songs "Teenage Life" and "It's a Beautiful Thing" (both of which eventually placed in the top two) would be disqualified from the competition as they had been commercially released before 1 October 2005. The BBC later responded by stating that both songs comply with the European Broadcasting Union (EBU) rules as the original version of "Teenage Life" was released under Daz Sampson's stage name Spacekats only as a white label record, while "It's a Beautiful Thing" was never commercially released as it wasn't available legally on the Internet.

== At Eurovision ==
According to Eurovision rules, all nations with the exceptions of the host country, the "Big Four" (France, Germany, Spain and the United Kingdom) and the ten highest placed finishers in the 2005 contest are required to qualify from the semi-final in order to compete for the final; the top ten countries from the semi-final progress to the final. As a member of the "Big Four", the United Kingdom automatically qualified to compete in the final on 20 May 2006. In addition to their participation in the final, the United Kingdom is also required to broadcast and vote in the semi-final on 18 May 2006.

In the United Kingdom, the semi-final was broadcast on BBC Three with commentary by Paddy O'Connell, while the final was televised on BBC One with commentary by Terry Wogan and broadcast on BBC Radio 2 with commentary by Ken Bruce. The BBC appointed Fearne Cotton as its spokesperson to announce the British votes during the final.

=== Final ===
Daz Sampson took part in technical rehearsals on 7 and 8 May, followed by dress rehearsals on 11 and 12 May. During the running order draw for the semi-final and final on 21 March 2006, the United Kingdom was placed to perform in position 15 in the final, following the entry from Lithuania and before the entry from Greece.

The British performance featured Daz Sampson, joined by five dancers/backing vocalists dressed in school uniform, performing on a multicoloured stage which featured props, including desks which papers were thrown out from, and a blackboard with Sampson's name written on, with the background displaying the words "class", "school", "history", and "book". The performance during the national final featured dancers miming the voices of a choir of young girls, however for Eurovision the voices were sung live by the dancers in order to avoid the violation of EBU rules. The supporting performers that joined Daz Sampson for the performance were Ashlee, Emily Reed, Gabriella, Holly and Leeanne Simister. The United Kingdom placed nineteenth in the final, scoring 25 points.

=== Voting ===
Below is a breakdown of points awarded to the United Kingdom and awarded by the United Kingdom in the semi-final and grand final of the contest. The nation awarded its 12 points to Finland in the semi-final and the final of the contest.

==== Points awarded to the United Kingdom ====
Points awarded to the United Kingdom (Final)
Score	Country
12 points	
10 points	
8 points	Ireland
7 points	
6 points	
5 points	
4 points	Denmark
3 points	Malta
2 points	Andorra; Estonia; Norway
1 point	Croatia; Cyprus; Latvia; Poland

==== Points awarded by the United Kingdom ====
Points awarded by the United Kingdom (Semi-final)
Score	Country
12 points	Finland
10 points	Lithuania
8 points	Ireland
7 points	Cyprus
6 points	Sweden
5 points	Iceland
4 points	Bosnia and Herzegovina
3 points	Armenia
2 points	Albania
1 point	Poland

Points awarded by the United Kingdom (Final)
Score	Country
12 points	Finland
10 points	Lithuania
8 points	Ireland
7 points	Greece
6 points	Romania
5 points	Germany
4 points	Sweden
3 points	Turkey
2 points	Latvia
1 point	Russia
