= Lithuania in the Eurovision Song Contest 2014 =

- Eurovision Song Contest 2014
- Country: Lithuania
- Selection process: "Eurovizijos" dainų konkurso nacionalinė atranka
- Selection date: 1 March 2014

Competing entry
- Song: "Attention"
- Artist: Vilija
- Songwriters: Vilija Matačiūnaitė; Viktoras Vaupšas

Placement
- Semi-final result: Failed to qualify (11th)

Participation chronology

Lithuania was represented at the Eurovision Song Contest 2014 with the song "Attention", written by Vilija Matačiūnaitė and Viktoras Vaupšas, and performed by Matačiūnaitė herself. The Lithuanian participating broadcaster, Lithuanian National Radio and Television (LRT), organised the national final "Eurovizijos" dainų konkurso nacionalinė atranka (Eurovision Song Contest national selection) in order to select its entry for the contest. The national final took place over 12 weeks and involved 20 artists and 16 songs competing in two different competitive streams. The results of each show were determined by the combination of votes from a jury panel and a public vote, and "Attention" performed by Vilija eventually emerged as the winner following the final.

Lithuania was drawn to compete in the second semi-final of the Eurovision Song Contest which took place on 8 May 2014. Performing during the show in position 7, "Attention" was not announced among the top 10 entries of the second semi-final and therefore did not qualify to compete in the final. It was later revealed that Lithuania placed 11th out of the 15 participating countries in the semi-final with 36 points.

== Background ==
Prior to the 2014 contest, Lithuania had participated in the Eurovision Song Contest 14 times since its first entry in 1994. The nation’s best placing in the contest was sixth, which it achieved in 2006 with the song "We Are the Winners", performed by LT United. Following the introduction of semi-finals in 2004, Lithuania, to this point, had managed to qualify to the final six times. In the 2013 contest, "Something" performed by Andrius Pojavis qualified to the final, where the song scored 17 points and placed 22nd.

For the 2014 contest, the Lithuanian national broadcaster, Lithuanian National Radio and Television (LRT), broadcast the event within Lithuania and organised the selection process for the nation's entry. Other than the internal selection of their debut entry in 1994, Lithuania has selected their entry consistently through a national final procedure. LRT confirmed their intentions to participate at the 2014 Eurovision Song Contest on 3 October 2013 and announced the organization of "Eurovizijos" dainų konkurso nacionalinė atranka, which would be the national final to select Lithuania's entry for Copenhagen.

== Before Eurovision ==
=== "Eurovizijos" dainų konkurso nacionalinė atranka ===
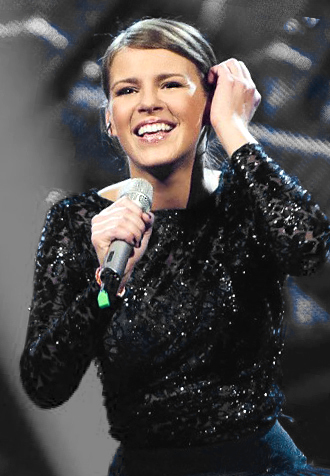
Vilija Matačiūnaitė performing at the Lithuanian national final

"Eurovizijos" dainų konkurso nacionalinė atranka (Eurovision Song Contest national selection) was the national final format developed by LRT in order to select Lithuania's entry for the Eurovision Song Contest 2014. The competition involved a 12-week-long process that commenced on 21 December 2013 and concluded with a winning song on 23 February 2014 and a winning artist on 1 March 2014. The 12 shows took place at the LRT studios in Vilnius and were hosted by Simona Nainė and Arūnas Valinskas. The shows were broadcast on LRT televizija, LRT Lituanica, and LRT Radijas, as well as online via the broadcaster's website lrt.lt. The final was also streamed online on the official Eurovision Song Contest website eurovision.tv.

==== Format ====
The Lithuanian broadcaster overhauled the format of the national final from that of previous years. The 2014 competition consisted of 12 shows and involved artists competing independently from songs, potentially being paired with any of the songs that were selected for the competition. The rules stated that composers were required to agree to the condition that their song may be offered to an artist they did not originally write the song for. The first show was a jubilee concert, where 15 of the 20 competing artists participated in a celebration of past Lithuanian Eurovision songs, and no elimination took place. From the second to tenth shows, the artists performed covers that related to the theme of that particular show and the potential Eurovision songs. The second and third show consisted of ten artists each and five were eliminated. During each of the fourth to tenth shows, one artist was eliminated, and the remaining three artists advanced in the competition. Starting from the fifth show, the 16 potential Eurovision songs competed on a weekly basis and a total of 13 songs were eliminated following the tenth show, leaving three songs remaining. The eleventh show was the competition's semi-final, where only the winning song was selected from the remaining three songs, while the twelfth show was the final, where the winning artist-song combination was selected from the remaining three artists. The format of the competition was originally set to take place over a ten-week period, where four artists would participate in the final; however, an additional two elimination shows were held after LRT experienced success in the ratings with the elimination shows.

The results of each of the 12 shows were determined by the 50/50 combination of votes from a jury panel and public televoting. The jury votes in all shows consisted of a combination of a Lithuanian jury panel and an international jury panel. From the second show to the semi-final, the members of the Lithuanian panel were required to come to a consensus in order to assign one set of points, which were added to the international panel results. During each show, each member of the international panel assigned points in a descending order with the highest score for their favourite and the lowest score for their least favourite, while the Lithuanian panel assigned a score from 1 to 10 to each artist from the second to the fifth shows and points based on ranking starting from the sixth show. In the final, the Lithuanian and international panels voted together, with each member awarding one set of points based on ranking. The public could vote through telephone and SMS voting, and the ranking developed by both streams of voting was converted to points from 1-8, 10 and 12 and assigned based on the number of competing artists in the respective show. Ties in the elimination shows and the semi-final were decided in favour of the entry that received the most votes from the public, while in the final, a tie would be decided in favour of the entry that was awarded the most points by the jury.

==== Competing artists and songs ====
On 2 October 2013, LRT opened two separate submission forms: one for artists and another for songwriters to submit their songs. The submission deadline for both applications concluded on 15 November 2013. On 28 December 2013, LRT announced the 20 artists selected for the competition. Among the artists was previous Lithuanian Eurovision contestant Sasha Song, who represented Lithuania in 2009. The 16 potential Eurovision songs selected from 106 submissions received were announced for listening and voting on 12 January 2014.

==== Artist and song progress in the shows ====
===== Artists =====
Artist	Show 2	Show 3	Show 4	Show 5	Show 6	Show 7	Show 8	Show 9	Show 10	Show 11 (Semi-final)	Show 12 (Final)
Vilija Matačiūnaitė	1st	—N/a	6th	5th	1st	5th	5th	1st	3rd	No elimination	1st
Mia	—N/a	1st	2nd	4th	2nd	6th	2nd	2nd	1st	No elimination	2nd
Vaidas Baumila	2nd	—N/a	1st	7th	4th	4th	4th	4th	2nd	No elimination	3rd
Monika Linkytė	—N/a	3rd	3rd	2nd	5th	2nd	1st	3rd	4th	Eliminated (Show 10)	
Martynas Kavaliauskas	—N/a	2nd	5th	1st	7th	3rd	3rd	5th	Eliminated (Show 9)		
Ieva Zasimauskaitė	—N/a	4th	4th	3rd	3rd	1st	6th	Eliminated (Show 8)			
VIG Roses	4th	—N/a	7th	6th	6th	7th	Eliminated (Show 7)				
Justinas Lapatinskas	5th	—N/a	9th	8th	8th	Eliminated (Show 6)					
Kristina Radžiukynaitė	—N/a	5th	8th	9th	Eliminated (Show 5)						
Aistė Pilvelytė	3rd	—N/a	10th	Eliminated (Show 4)							
Pop Ladies	—N/a	6th	Eliminated (Show 3)								
Gintė Sičiūnaitė	—N/a	7th	Eliminated (Show 3)								
Soliaris	—N/a	8th	Eliminated (Show 3)								
Neringa Šiaudikytė	—N/a	9th	Eliminated (Show 3)								
Tadas Vilčinskas	—N/a	10th	Eliminated (Show 3)								
Julija Jegorova	6th	Eliminated (Show 2)									
Jurijus Veklenko	7th	Eliminated (Show 2)									
Sasha Song	8th	Eliminated (Show 2)									
Aleksandra Metalnikova	9th	Eliminated (Show 2)									
Juozas Butnorius	10th	Eliminated (Show 2)									

===== Songs =====
Song	Songwriter(s)	Show 7	Show 8	Show 9	Show 10	Show 11 (Semi-final)
"Attention"	Vilija Matačiūnaitė, Viktoras Vaupšas	1st	2nd	1st	1st	1st
"Take a Look at Me Now"	Aidan O'Connor, Christian Schneider, Sara Biglert	8th	7th	5th	2nd	2nd
"It's All About a Boy"	Alison Ellul, Aidan O'Connor, Elton Zarb	9th	9th	7th	3rd	3rd
"Worlds Apart"	Georgios Kalpakidis, Yaron Malachi	4th	6th	3rd	4th	Eliminated (Show 10)
"Blowing Out Cobwebs"	Rafael Artesero	1st	1st	2nd	5th	Eliminated (Show 10)
"Dying"	Edgaras Lubys	3rd	3rd	3rd	5th	Eliminated (Show 10)
"It's Not Too Late"	Aidan O'Connor, Christian Schneider, Sara Biglert	11th	10th	7th	5th	Eliminated (Show 10)
"Let's Share That Love Tonight"	Phillippe Germain	7th	3rd	6th	8th	Eliminated (Show 10)
"You Found Me"	Aidan O'Connor, Christian Schneider, Sara Biglert, Camilla Moller, Karin Wannback	6th	8th	9th	Eliminated (Show 9)	
"Is This the Way (You Want Me)"	Aidan O'Connor, Christian Schneider, Sara Biglert, Kenny Leckremo	4th	3rd	10th	Eliminated (Show 9)	
"Breakaway"	Ylva Persson, Linda Persson	12th	11th	Eliminated (Show 8)		
"Last Date"	Dmitri Šavrov	9th	12th	Eliminated (Show 8)		
"Silent Tears"	Jonas Gladnikoff, Natasha Turner, Ylva Persson, Linda Persson	13th	Eliminated (Show 7)			
"In the Rain"	Aidan O'Connor, Christian Schneider, Sara Biglert, Madeleine Jangklev	14th	Eliminated (Show 7)			
"One"	Aidan O'Connor, Christian Schneider, Sara Biglert, Erik Grönwall	15th	Eliminated (Show 7)			
"New Beginning"	Aidan O'Connor, Christian Schneider, Sara Biglert, Madeline Jangklev	16th	Eliminated (Show 7)			

==== Jury members ====
The Lithuanian jury panel consisted of four members in the elimination shows and the semi-final, and two members in the final. The international jury panel in all shows consisted of three members: Brandon Stone (German music producer and composer), Valerij Prosvirov (Russian producer and record label director) and Liselott Björk (Swedish singer and vocal coach).

Lithuanian jury members by show
Jury member	Elimination shows										Semi-final	Final	Occupation(s)
Jury member	1	2	3	4	5	6	7	8	9	10	Semi-final	Final	Occupation(s)
Adrija Čepaitė	—N/a	No	Yes	No	No	No	Yes	No	No	No	No	No	actress
Darius Užkuraitis	—N/a	No	No	No	Yes	Yes	No	No	Yes	Yes	No	No	musicologist, LRT Opus director
Deivydas Zvonkus	—N/a	No	No	No	No	No	No	No	No	No	Yes	No	composer
Edmundas Seilius	—N/a	Yes	Yes	Yes	Yes	Yes	Yes	Yes	Yes	No	Yes	No	opera singer
Ieva Prudnikovaitė-Pitrėnė	—N/a	No	No	Yes	Yes	No	No	No	No	No	No	No	opera singer
Jurga Šeduikytė	—N/a	Yes	No	No	No	No	No	No	No	No	No	No	singer-songwriter
Lauras Lučiūnas	—N/a	No	No	No	No	No	No	No	No	No	No	Yes	producer
Ramūnas Zilnys	—N/a	Yes	Yes	Yes	Yes	Yes	Yes	Yes	Yes	Yes	Yes	No	music reviewer
Sigutė Stonytė	—N/a	No	No	No	No	No	No	Yes	No	Yes	No	Yes	opera singer
Vytenis Pauliukaitis	—N/a	Yes	Yes	Yes	No	Yes	Yes	Yes	Yes	Yes	Yes	No	director

==== Shows ====
===== Elimination shows =====
The ten elimination shows of the competition aired between 14 December 2013 and 15 February 2014 and featured the twenty competing artists. In the first four shows, the artists performed covers that related to the theme of that particular show: past Lithuanian Eurovision songs in the jubilee concert, past Eurovision songs in the second show, Lithuanian hit songs in the third show, and worldwide hit songs in the fourth show. No elimination took place during the jubilee concert, while the second and third show each featured ten artists and the bottom five were eliminated. One artist was eliminated in each of the fourth and fifth shows and the remaining eight artists in the competition performed the potential Eurovision songs starting from the sixth show. The artists each performed one song in the sixth and seventh shows and two songs between the eighth to tenth shows, and one artist was eliminated per show.

For the ninth elimination show, LRT opted to delay the announcement of the results until 10 February 2014 after conducting an investigation in regards to voting fraud. On 10 February, LRT announced that the televote score for Martynas Kavaliauskas had been reduced from 1,332 to 655 as it was discovered that a mobile operator was inflating Kavaliauskas' votes. This ultimately led to the elimination of Kavaliauskas from the competition as he ranked last by both the jury vote and the public vote.

Jubilee Concert – 14 December 2013
R/O	Artist	Song (Original artists)
1	Justinas Lapatinskas	"Lopšinė mylimai" (Ovidijus Vyšniauskas)
2	Vilija Matačiūnaitė	"Strazdas" (Aistė)
3	VIG Roses	"You Got Style" (Skamp)
4	Martynas Kavaliauskas	"Happy You" (Aivaras)
5	Jurijus Veklenko and Monika Linkytė	"What's Happened to Your Love?" (Linas and Simona)
6	Soliaris	"Little by Little" (Laura and the Lovers)
7	Pop Ladies	"We Are the Winners" (LT United)
8	Aleksandra Metalnikova	"Love or Leave" (4Fun)
9	Julija Jegorova	"Nomads in the Night" (Jeronimas Milius)
10	Aistė Pilvelytė	"Pasiklydęs žmogus" (Sasha Son)
11	Juozas Butnorius and Tadas Vilčinskas	"Eastern European Funk" (InCulto)
12	Neringa Šiaudikytė	"C'est ma vie" (Evelina Sašenko)
13	Mia	"Something" (Andrius Pojavis)

Show 2 – 21 December 2013
R/O	Artist	Song (Original artists)	Jury		Televote		Place	Result
R/O	Artist	Song (Original artists)	Votes	Rank	Votes	Rank	Place	Result
1	Aistė Pilvelytė	"Euphoria" (Loreen)	23	5	541	3	3	Advanced
2	Aleksandra Metalnikova	"Wild Dances" (Ruslana)	21	7	110	8	9	Eliminated
3	Vaidas Baumila	"L'essenziale" (Marco Mengoni)	37	1	436	4	2	Advanced
4	Julija Jegorova	"Shady Lady" (Ani Lorak)	27	4	120	7	6	Eliminated
5	Vilija Matačiūnaitė	"Hasheket Shenish'ar" (Shiri Maimon)	29	2	747	1	1	Advanced
6	Jurijus Veklenko	"Standing Still" (Roman Lob)	29	2	99	9	7	Eliminated
7	Justinas Lapatinskas	"New Tomorrow" (A Friend in London)	23	5	294	5	5	Advanced
8	Sasha Song	"Ne partez pas sans moi" (Celine Dion)	21	7	231	6	8	Eliminated
9	Juozas Butnorius	"Fly on the Wings of Love" (Olsen Brothers)	19	9	94	10	10	Eliminated
10	VIG Roses	"Cool Vibes" (Vanilla Ninja)	19	9	577	2	4	Advanced

Detailed Jury Votes
R/O	Artist	Lithuanian Jury	B. Stone	V. Prosvirov	L. Björk	Total
1	Aistė Pilvelytė	9	2	10	2	23
2	Aleksandra Metalnikova	6	4	3	8	21
3	Vaidas Baumila	10	10	8	9	37
4	Julija Jegorova	9	7	1	10	27
5	Vilija Matačiūnaitė	10	6	9	4	29
6	Jurijus Veklenko	8	8	6	7	29
7	Justinas Lapatinskas	10	1	7	5	23
8	Sasha Song	5	9	4	3	21
9	Juozas Butnorius	8	5	5	1	19
10	VIG Roses	8	3	2	6	19

Show 3 – 28 December 2013
R/O	Artist	Song (Original artists)	Jury		Televote		Place	Result
R/O	Artist	Song (Original artists)	Votes	Rank	Votes	Rank	Place	Result
1	Pop Ladies	"Molitva" (Marija Šerifović)	27	4	450	5	6	Eliminated
2	Monika Linkytė	"Gravity" (Zlata Ognevich)	34	1	234	8	3	Advanced
3	Soliaris	"It's My Time" (Jade Ewen)	26	7	312	6	8	Eliminated
4	Neringa Šiaudikytė	"Believe" (Dima Bilan)	24	8	64	10	9	Eliminated
5	Ieva Zasimauskaitė	"Satellite" (Lena)	27	4	501	4	4	Advanced
6	Martynas Kavaliauskas	"All Night Long" (Simon Mathew)	29	2	520	3	2	Advanced
7	Gintė Sičiūnaitė	"Is It True?" (Yohanna)	28	3	281	7	7	Eliminated
8	Tadas Vilčinskas	"Never Let You Go" (Dima Bilan)	10	10	117	9	10	Eliminated
9	Mia	"Only Teardrops" (Emmelie de Forest)	27	4	1,153	1	1	Advanced
10	Kristina Radžiukynaitė	"Everything" (Anna Vissi)	19	9	580	2	5	Advanced

Detailed Jury Votes
R/O	Artist	Lithuanian Jury	B. Stone	V. Prosvirov	L. Björk	Total
1	Pop Ladies	10	7	8	2	27
2	Monika Linkytė	9	10	5	10	34
3	Soliaris	7	9	3	7	26
4	Neringa Šiaudikytė	8	8	4	4	24
5	Ieva Zasimauskaitė	9	3	6	9	27
6	Martynas Kavaliauskas	10	6	10	3	29
7	Gintė Sičiūnaitė	9	4	9	6	28
8	Tadas Vilčinskas	6	1	2	1	10
9	Mia	10	2	7	8	27
10	Kristina Radžiukynaitė	8	5	1	5	19

Show 4 – 4 January 2014
R/O	Artist	Song (Original artists)	Jury		Televote		Place	Result
R/O	Artist	Song (Original artists)	Votes	Rank	Votes	Rank	Place	Result
1	Vilija Matačiūnaitė	"Lyja" (Electronic I and Sel)	22	7	634	4	6	Advanced
2	Justinas Lapatinskas	"Ar mylit ją jūs?" (Marijonas Mikutavičius)	23	6	259	10	9	Advanced
3	Monika Linkytė	"Pavakarys" (Alvydas Lukoševičius)	29	3	675	3	3	Advanced
4	Kristina Radžiukynaitė	"Aš žiūriu į tave, pasauli" (Sel)	21	8	489	7	8	Advanced
5	Aistė Pilvelytė	"Užgimimas" (Povilas Meškėla and Rojaus tūzai)	18	9	475	8	10	Eliminated
6	Martynas Kavaliauskas	"Gyvenam kartą" (Mantas Jankavičius)	16	10	1,477	1	5	Advanced
7	Ieva Zasimauskaitė	"Jurgos klejonės" (from Velnio nuotaka)	32	2	513	6	4	Advanced
8	Vaidas Baumila	"Meilę skolingas tau" (Stasys Povilaitis)	37	1	620	5	1	Advanced
9	Mia	"Saulė" (Pikaso)	24	5	1,009	2	2	Advanced
10	VIG Roses	"Nakty" (Kastytis Kerbedis)	28	4	464	9	7	Advanced

Detailed Jury Votes
R/O	Artist	Lithuanian Jury	B. Stone	V. Prosvirov	L. Björk	Total
1	Vilija Matačiūnaitė	9	5	4	4	22
2	Justinas Lapatinskas	8	4	6	5	23
3	Monika Linkytė	10	10	2	7	29
4	Kristina Radžiukynaitė	8	3	1	9	21
5	Aistė Pilvelytė	9	2	5	2	18
6	Martynas Kavaliauskas	6	1	8	1	16
7	Ieva Zasimauskaitė	7	8	7	10	32
8	Vaidas Baumila	10	9	10	8	37
9	Mia	8	7	3	6	24
10	VIG Roses	10	6	9	3	28

Show 5 – 11 January 2014
R/O	Artist	Song (Original artists)	Jury		Televote		Place	Result
R/O	Artist	Song (Original artists)	Votes	Rank	Votes	Rank	Place	Result
1	Vaidas Baumila	"Saturday Night's Alright for Fighting" (Elton John)	23	6	697	5	7	Advanced
2	Mia	"Broken-Hearted Girl" (Beyoncé)	19	8	817	2	4	Advanced
3	VIG Roses	"Free Your Mind" (En Vogue)	25	3	614	6	6	Advanced
4	Martynas Kavaliauskas	"Let Her Go" (Passenger)	25	3	902	1	1	Advanced
5	Vilija Matačiūnaitė	"Spectrum (Say My Name)" (Florence and the Machine)	20	7	788	3	5	Advanced
6	Justinas Lapatinskas	"We Found Love" (Rihanna feat. Calvin Harris)	24	5	491	9	8	Advanced
7	Ieva Zasimauskaitė	"Dear Mr. President" (Pink feat. Indigo Girls)	32	1	607	7	3	Advanced
8	Monika Linkytė	"Radioactive" (Imagine Dragons)	29	2	756	4	2	Advanced
9	Kristina Radžiukynaitė	"Wings" (Little Mix)	19	8	604	8	9	Eliminated

Detailed Jury Votes
R/O	Artist	Lithuanian Jury	B. Stone	V. Prosvirov	L. Björk	Total
1	Vaidas Baumila	9	2	3	9	23
2	Mia	9	6	1	3	19
3	VIG Roses	8	7	4	6	25
4	Martynas Kavaliauskas	10	4	7	4	25
5	Vilija Matačiūnaitė	10	3	6	1	20
6	Justinas Lapatinskas	9	5	8	2	24
7	Ieva Zasimauskaitė	8	8	9	7	32
8	Monika Linkytė	10	9	5	5	29
9	Kristina Radžiukynaitė	8	1	2	8	19

Show 6 – 18 January 2014
R/O	Artist	Song	Jury		Televote		Place	Result
R/O	Artist	Song	Votes	Rank	Votes	Rank	Place	Result
1	Mia	"Take a Look at Me Now"	13	6	854	2	2	Advanced
2	Vilija Matačiūnaitė	"Attention"	25	1	1,114	1	1	Advanced
3	Martynas Kavaliauskas	"It's Not Too Late"	14	5	708	6	7	Advanced
4	Ieva Zasimauskaitė	"One"	25	1	658	7	3	Advanced
5	Vaidas Baumila	"Dying"	24	3	788	4	4	Advanced
6	Monika Linkytė	"Breakaway"	24	3	729	5	5	Advanced
7	Justinas Lapatinskas	"Last Date"	8	8	221	8	8	Eliminated
8	VIG Roses	"In the Rain"	11	7	837	3	6	Advanced

Detailed Jury Votes
R/O	Artist	Lithuanian Jury	B. Stone	V. Prosvirov	L. Björk	Total
1	Mia	4	4	1	4	13
2	Vilija Matačiūnaitė	8	8	4	5	25
3	Martynas Kavaliauskas	2	2	7	3	14
4	Ieva Zasimauskaitė	6	5	8	6	25
5	Vaidas Baumila	5	6	6	7	24
6	Monika Linkytė	7	7	2	8	24
7	Justinas Lapatinskas	3	1	3	1	8
8	VIG Roses	1	3	5	2	11

Show 7 – 25 January 2014
R/O	Artist	Song	Jury		Televote		Place	Result
R/O	Artist	Song	Votes	Rank	Votes	Rank	Place	Result
1	Vaidas Baumila	"Worlds Apart"	23	2	994	6	4	Advanced
2	Monika Linkytė	"It's All About a Boy"	26	1	1,017	5	2	Advanced
3	Vilija Matačiūnaitė	"You Found Me"	13	5	1,085	3	5	Advanced
4	Martynas Kavaliauskas	"New Beginning"	8	7	1,211	1	3	Advanced
5	VIG Roses	"Silent Tears"	9	6	987	7	7	Eliminated
6	Mia	"Let's Share That Love Tonight"	14	4	1,051	4	6	Advanced
7	Ieva Zasimauskaitė	"Blowing Out Cobwebs"	19	3	1,090	2	1	Advanced

Detailed Jury Votes
R/O	Artist	Lithuanian Jury	B. Stone	V. Prosvirov	L. Björk	Total
1	Vaidas Baumila	6	5	7	5	23
2	Monika Linkytė	7	7	5	7	26
3	Vilija Matačiūnaitė	3	6	3	1	13
4	Martynas Kavaliauskas	1	1	4	2	8
5	VIG Roses	2	3	1	3	9
6	Mia	4	4	2	4	14
7	Ieva Zasimauskaitė	5	2	6	6	19

Show 8 – 1 February 2014
R/O	Artist	Song	Jury		Televote		Place	Result
R/O	Artist	Song	Votes	Rank	Votes	Rank	Place	Result
1	Ieva Zasimauskaitė	"You Found Me"	23	6	968	6	6	Eliminated
1	Ieva Zasimauskaitė	"It's All About a Boy"	23	6	968	6	6	Eliminated
2	Mia	"Blowing Out Cobwebs"	26	4	1,234	1	2	Advanced
2	Mia	"Attention"	26	4	1,234	1	2	Advanced
3	Vaidas Baumila	"It's Not Too Late"	30	3	1,090	4	4	Advanced
3	Vaidas Baumila	"Last Date"	30	3	1,090	4	4	Advanced
4	Monika Linkytė	"Worlds Apart"	32	2	1,194	2	1	Advanced
4	Monika Linkytė	"Take a Look at Me Now"	32	2	1,194	2	1	Advanced
5	Martynas Kavaliauskas	"Breakaway"	33	1	1,064	5	3	Advanced
5	Martynas Kavaliauskas	"Dying"	33	1	1,064	5	3	Advanced
6	Vilija Matačiūnaitė	"Is This the Way (You Want Me)"	24	5	1,177	3	5	Advanced
6	Vilija Matačiūnaitė	"Let's Share That Love Tonight"	24	5	1,177	3	5	Advanced

Detailed Jury Votes
R/O	Artist	Song	Lithuanian Jury	B. Stone	V. Prosvirov	L. Björk	Total
1	Ieva Zasimauskaitė	"You Found Me"	1	1	4	1	23
1	Ieva Zasimauskaitė	"It's All About a Boy"	1	3	6	6	23
2	Mia	"Blowing Out Cobwebs"	3	2	1	2	26
2	Mia	"Attention"	6	6	2	4	26
3	Vaidas Baumila	"It's Not Too Late"	6	4	5	4	30
3	Vaidas Baumila	"Last Date"	5	1	3	2	30
4	Monika Linkytė	"Worlds Apart"	4	6	2	5	32
4	Monika Linkytė	"Take a Look at Me Now"	4	5	1	5	32
5	Martynas Kavaliauskas	"Breakaway"	5	5	3	6	33
5	Martynas Kavaliauskas	"Dying"	3	4	4	3	33
6	Vilija Matačiūnaitė	"Is This the Way (You Want Me)"	2	3	6	3	24
6	Vilija Matačiūnaitė	"Let's Share That Love Tonight"	2	2	5	1	24

Show 9 – 8 February 2014
R/O	Artist	Song	Jury		Televote		Place	Result
R/O	Artist	Song	Votes	Rank	Votes	Rank	Place	Result
1	Mia	"It's Not Too Late"	21	4	1,355	1	2	Advanced
1	Mia	"It's All About a Boy"	21	4	1,355	1	2	Advanced
2	Martynas Kavaliauskas	"Worlds Apart"	15	5	655	5	5	Eliminated
2	Martynas Kavaliauskas	"Take a Look at Me Now"	15	5	655	5	5	Eliminated
3	Vilija Matačiūnaitė	"Blowing Out Cobwebs"	26	2	1,302	2	1	Advanced
3	Vilija Matačiūnaitė	"Dying"	26	2	1,302	2	1	Advanced
4	Vaidas Baumila	"Attention"	25	3	1,113	3	4	Advanced
4	Vaidas Baumila	"Is This the Way (You Want Me)"	25	3	1,113	3	4	Advanced
5	Monika Linkytė	"You Found Me"	33	1	1,079	4	3	Advanced
5	Monika Linkytė	"Let's Share That Love Tonight"	33	1	1,079	4	3	Advanced

Detailed Jury Votes
R/O	Artist	Song	Lithuanian Jury	B. Stone	V. Prosvirov	L. Björk	Total
1	Mia	"It's Not Too Late"	4	2	2	2	21
1	Mia	"It's All About a Boy"	2	4	1	4	21
2	Martynas Kavaliauskas	"Worlds Apart"	2	3	1	3	15
2	Martynas Kavaliauskas	"Take a Look at Me Now"	1	2	2	1	15
3	Vilija Matačiūnaitė	"Blowing Out Cobwebs"	5	1	3	1	26
3	Vilija Matačiūnaitė	"Dying"	4	5	5	2	26
4	Vaidas Baumila	"Attention"	1	4	5	4	25
4	Vaidas Baumila	"Is This the Way (You Want Me)"	3	1	4	3	25
5	Monika Linkytė	"You Found Me"	3	5	4	5	33
5	Monika Linkytė	"Let's Share That Love Tonight"	5	3	3	5	33

Show 10 – 15 February 2014
R/O	Artist	Song	Jury		Televote		Place	Result
R/O	Artist	Song	Votes	Rank	Votes	Rank	Place	Result
1	Vilija Matačiūnaitė	"Worlds Apart"	14	4	2,137	2	3	Advanced
1	Vilija Matačiūnaitė	"It's All About a Boy"	14	4	2,137	2	3	Advanced
2	Vaidas Baumila	"Dying"	24	1	1,446	4	2	Advanced
2	Vaidas Baumila	"It's Not Too Late"	24	1	1,446	4	2	Advanced
3	Monika Linkytė	"Attention"	19	3	1,790	3	4	Eliminated
3	Monika Linkytė	"Blowing Out Cobwebs"	19	3	1,790	3	4	Eliminated
4	Mia	"Let's Share That Love Tonight"	23	2	2,583	1	1	Advanced
4	Mia	"Take a Look at Me Now"	23	2	2,583	1	1	Advanced

Detailed Jury Votes
R/O	Artist	Song	Lithuanian Jury	B. Stone	V. Prosvirov	L. Björk	Total
1	Vilija Matačiūnaitė	"Worlds Apart"	1	1	2	1	14
1	Vilija Matačiūnaitė	"It's All About a Boy"	3	2	3	1	14
2	Vaidas Baumila	"Dying"	3	3	4	4	24
2	Vaidas Baumila	"It's Not Too Late"	1	3	4	2	24
3	Monika Linkytė	"Attention"	2	4	3	3	19
3	Monika Linkytė	"Blowing Out Cobwebs"	2	1	1	3	19
4	Mia	"Let's Share That Love Tonight"	4	2	1	2	23
4	Mia	"Take a Look at Me Now"	4	4	2	4	23

==== Song selection ====
The 16 potential Eurovision songs were evaluated by the public through an internet vote on LRT's voting platform over four rounds. Voting in the first round was to take place between 11 and 18 January 2014, however, it was extended by a week until 25 January 2014 due to a change in the format of the competition. The first round resulted in the elimination of four songs, while the second and third round resulted in the elimination of two songs each. The bottom five songs were eliminated following the fourth round and the top three advanced to the semi-final. The results of all rounds were determined by the 50/50 combination of votes from a jury panel and public voting on LRT's internet platform.

First Round – 11–25 January 2014
Song	Jury	Internet Vote		Total	Place	Result
Song	Jury	Votes	Points	Total	Place	Result
"Attention"	15	3,665	16	31	1	Advanced
"Blowing Out Cobwebs"	16	3,194	15	31	1	Advanced
"Breakaway"	6	323	4	10	12	Advanced
"Dying"	14	848	11	25	3	Advanced
"In the Rain"	3	255	3	6	14	Eliminated
"Is This the Way (You Want Me)"	10	1,631	12	22	4	Advanced
"It's All About a Boy"	7	725	10	17	9	Advanced
"It's Not Too Late"	9	430	7	16	11	Advanced
"Last Date"	12	336	5	17	9	Advanced
"Let's Share That Love Tonight"	13	405	6	19	7	Advanced
"New Beginning"	2	200	2	4	16	Eliminated
"One"	4	174	1	5	15	Eliminated
"Silent Tears"	1	503	8	9	13	Eliminated
"Take a Look at Me Now"	5	1,875	13	18	8	Advanced
"Worlds Apart"	8	2,579	14	22	4	Advanced
"You Found Me"	11	721	9	20	6	Advanced

Second Round – 26 January–2 February 2014
Song	Jury	Internet Vote		Total	Place	Result
Song	Jury	Votes	Points	Total	Place	Result
"Attention"	12	2,892	10	22	2	Advanced
"Blowing Out Cobwebs"	11	4,561	12	23	1	Advanced
"Breakaway"	2	420	4	6	11	Eliminated
"Dying"	8	501	8	16	5	Advanced
"Is This the Way (You Want Me)"	10	496	6	16	3	Advanced
"It's All About a Boy"	3	460	5	8	9	Advanced
"It's Not Too Late"	6	162	1	7	10	Advanced
"Last Date"	1	401	3	4	12	Eliminated
"Let's Share That Love Tonight"	9	497	7	16	4	Advanced
"Take a Look at Me Now"	5	548	9	14	7	Advanced
"Worlds Apart"	4	3,136	11	15	6	Advanced
"You Found Me"	7	175	2	9	8	Advanced

Third Round – 3–10 February 2014
Song	Jury	Internet Vote		Total	Place	Result
Song	Jury	Votes	Points	Total	Place	Result
"Attention"	10	1,961	10	20	1	Advanced
"Blowing Out Cobwebs"	9	1,412	8	17	2	Advanced
"Dying"	8	448	6	14	3	Advanced
"Is This the Way (You Want Me)"	1	406	4	5	10	Eliminated
"It's All About a Boy"	2	418	5	7	8	Advanced
"It's Not Too Late"	6	326	1	7	7	Advanced
"Let's Share That Love Tonight"	7	401	2	9	6	Advanced
"Take a Look at Me Now"	4	506	7	11	5	Advanced
"Worlds Apart"	5	1,904	9	14	3	Advanced
"You Found Me"	3	404	3	6	9	Eliminated

Fourth Round – 12–17 February 2014
Song	Jury	Internet Vote		Total	Place	Result
Song	Jury	Votes	Points	Total	Place	Result
"Attention"	6	1,312	8	14	1	Advanced
"Blowing Out Cobwebs"	3	628	5	8	7	Eliminated
"Dying"	4	492	4	8	6	Eliminated
"It's All About a Boy"	8	290	2	10	3	Advanced
"It's Not Too Late"	5	413	3	8	5	Eliminated
"Let's Share That Love Tonight"	1	274	1	2	8	Eliminated
"Take a Look at Me Now"	7	1,117	6	13	2	Advanced
"Worlds Apart"	2	1,238	7	9	4	Eliminated

===== Semi-final =====
The semi-final of the competition aired on 23 February 2014 and featured each of the remaining three artists that qualified from the tenth elimination show performing the remaining three potential Eurovision songs. The show was originally scheduled to air on 22 February 2014; however, it was postponed due to LRT broadcasting live coverage of Euromaidan in Ukraine. The members of the Lithuanian jury consisted of Vytenis Pauliukaitis (director), Deivydas Zvonkus (lead singer of the group B'Avarija), Ramūnas Zilnys (music reviewer), and Edmundas Seilius (opera singer). International jury members included Brandon Stone (German music producer and composer), Valerij Prosvirov (Russian producer and record label director), and Liselott Björk (Swedish singer and vocal coach). The combination of the jury vote and the public vote resulted in a tie between two songs with 22 points each: "Attention" and "Take a Look at Me Now". "Attention" was declared the winning song as it received the most votes from the public.

Semi-final – 23 February 2014
R/O	Song	Jury		Televote		Total	Place
R/O	Song	Votes	Points	Votes	Points	Total	Place
1	"Attention"	8	10	2,732	12	22	1
2	"Take a Look at Me Now"	11	12	2,484	10	22	2
3	"It's All About a Boy"	5	8	205	8	16	3

Detailed Jury Votes
R/O	Song	Lithuanian Jury	B. Stone	V. Prosvirov	L. Björk	Total
1	"Attention"	2	2	3	1	8
2	"Take a Look at Me Now"	3	3	2	3	11
3	"It's All About a Boy"	1	1	1	2	5

===== Final =====
The final of the competition took place on 1 March 2014 and featured the remaining three artists that qualified from the 10th elimination show each performing two songs: a cover of their choice and the winning song selected from the semi-final, "Attention". The final was the only show in the competition to be broadcast live; all other preceding shows were pre-recorded earlier in the week before their airdates. Vilija Matačiūnaitė was selected as the winner after gaining the most points from both the jury vote and the public vote. In addition to the performances of the competing artists, Monika Linkytė performed as the interval act.

Final – 1 March 2014
R/O	Artist	Song (Original artists)	Jury		Televote		Total	Place
R/O	Artist	Song (Original artists)	Votes	Points	Votes	Points	Total	Place
1	Mia	"Take a Look at Me Now"	12	10	7,506	10	20	2
1	Mia	"Attention"	12	10	7,506	10	20	2
2	Vaidas Baumila	"Ordinary People" (John Legend)	5	8	962	8	16	3
2	Vaidas Baumila	"Attention"	5	8	962	8	16	3
3	Vilija Matačiūnaitė	"I Was Here" (Beyoncé)	13	12	9,596	12	24	1
3	Vilija Matačiūnaitė	"Attention"	13	12	9,596	12	24	1

Detailed Jury Votes
R/O	Artist	S. Stonytė	L. Lučiūnas	B. Stone	V. Prosvirov	L. Björk	Total
1	Mia	2	2	3	3	2	12
2	Vaidas Baumila	1	1	1	1	1	5
3	Vilija Matačiūnaitė	3	3	2	2	3	13

=== Preparation ===
Following Vilija Matačiūnaitė's win during the Lithuanian national final, the singer recorded the final version of "Attention" at Studio 301 in Sydney with technical production by Sameer Sengupta. The final version was released on 28 March. Earlier on 15 March, LRT broadcast the support concert Būkime kartu, where Lithuanian viewers could call to donate funds to support the Lithuanian Eurovision participation. The concert featured guests Jurga Šeduikytė, Ramūnas Rudokas, Marius Jampolskis, Pop Ladies, and Sasha Song, and raised 48,000 LTL from the public donations.

=== Promotion ===
Vilija specifically promoted "Attention" as the Lithuanian Eurovision entry on 5 April 2014 by performing during the Eurovision in Concert event, which was held at the Melkweg venue in Amsterdam, Netherlands and hosted by Cornald Maas and Sandra Reemer.

== At Eurovision ==
Vilija presenting herself and "Attention" at the Eurovision Song Contest 2014

According to Eurovision rules, all nations with the exceptions of the host country and the "Big Five" (France, Germany, Italy, Spain and the United Kingdom) are required to qualify from one of two semi-finals in order to compete for the final; the top ten countries from each semi-final progress to the final. The European Broadcasting Union (EBU) split up the competing countries into six different pots based on voting patterns from previous contests, with countries with favourable voting histories put into the same pot. On 20 January 2014, an allocation draw was held which placed each country into one of the two semi-finals, as well as which half of the show they would perform in. Lithuania was placed into the second semi-final, to be held on 8 May 2014, and was scheduled to perform in the first half of the show.

Once all the competing songs for the 2014 contest had been released, the running order for the semi-finals was decided by the shows' producers rather than through another draw, so that similar songs were not placed next to each other. Lithuania was set to perform in position 7, following the entry from Austria and before the entry from Finland.

The two semi-finals and final were broadcast in Lithuania on LRT televizija and LRT Radijas with commentary by Darius Užkuraitis. The Lithuanian spokesperson who announced the Lithuanian votes during the final was Ignas Krupavičius.

=== Controversy ===
Just before the announcement that Lithuania's ten points had been awarded to Austria, Krupavičius said, referring to Conchita Wurst's beard, "Now it is time to shave", then pulled out a razor and pretended to shave his own face, before giggling at the joke. Host Nikolaj Koppel replied to that by saying, "Time to shave? I think not." BBC commentator Graham Norton also expressed his frustration at the joke and supported Koppel's reply.

=== Semi-final ===
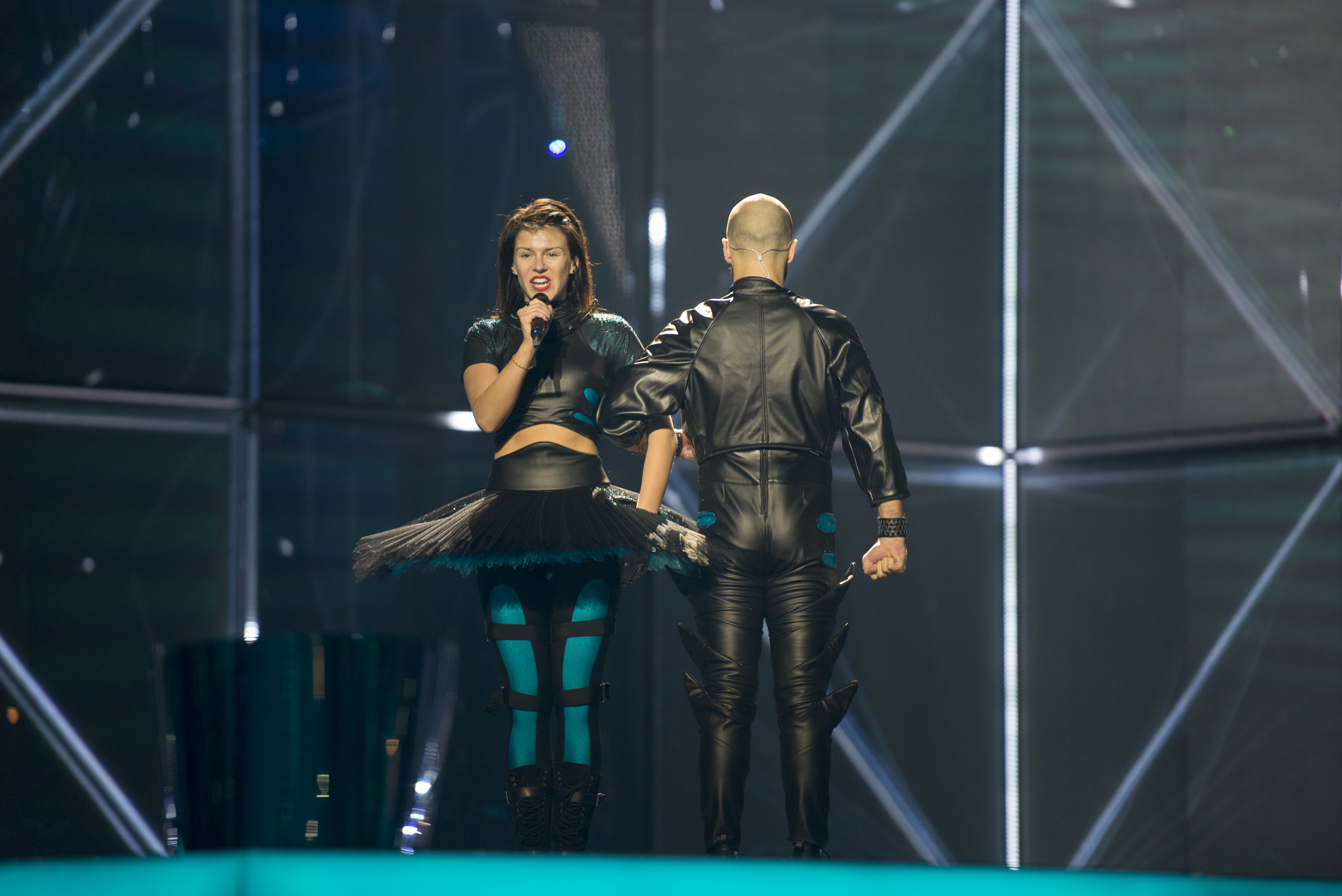
Vilija during a rehearsal before the second semi-final

Vilija took part in technical rehearsals on 30 April and 3 May, followed by dress rehearsals on 7 and 8 May. This included the jury show on 7 May, where the professional juries of each country watched and voted on the competing entries.

The Lithuanian performance featured Vilija performing expressive choreography on stage with a dancer. The stage floor displayed turquoise colours and the LED screens displayed predominantly grey, black, and white colours with flashing lights and pieces of broken glass. The performance also featured smoke effects. The dancer joining Vilija was Šarūnas Kirdeikis, while three backing vocalists were also on stage: Eglė Gadeikytė, Algė Matekūnaitė, and Lina Žilinskaitė. Kirdeikis previously represented Lithuania in 2010 as part of InCulto.

At the end of the show, Lithuania was not announced among the top 10 entries in the second semi-final and therefore failed to qualify to compete in the final. It was later revealed that Lithuania placed 11th in the semi-final, receiving a total of 36 points.

=== Voting ===
Voting during the three shows consisted of 50 percent public televoting and 50 percent from a jury deliberation. The jury consisted of five music industry professionals who were citizens of the country they represent, with their names published before the contest to ensure transparency. This jury was asked to judge each contestant based on: vocal capacity; the stage performance; the song's composition and originality; and the overall impression by the act. In addition, no member of a national jury could be related in any way to any of the competing acts in such a way that they cannot vote impartially and independently. The individual rankings of each jury member were released shortly after the final.

Following the release of the full split voting by the EBU after the conclusion of the competition, it was revealed that Lithuania had placed 11th with both the public televote and the jury vote in the second semi-final. In the public vote, Lithuania scored 41 points, while with the jury vote, Lithuania scored 44 points.

Below is a breakdown of points awarded to Lithuania and awarded by Lithuania in the second semi-final and final of the contest, and the breakdown of the jury voting and televoting conducted during the two shows:

==== Points awarded to Lithuania ====
Points awarded to Lithuania (Semi-final 2)
Score	Country
12 points	
10 points	United Kingdom
8 points	
7 points	Georgia
6 points	Belarus
5 points	Ireland; Norway
4 points	
3 points	
2 points	Poland
1 point	Italy

==== Points awarded by Lithuania ====
Points awarded by Lithuania (Semi-final 2)
Score	Country
12 points	Belarus
10 points	Austria
8 points	Norway
7 points	Switzerland
6 points	Georgia
5 points	Finland
4 points	Poland
3 points	Slovenia
2 points	Romania
1 point	Malta

Points awarded by Lithuania (Final)
Score	Country
12 points	Netherlands
10 points	Austria
8 points	Norway
7 points	Sweden
6 points	Russia
5 points	Ukraine
4 points	Spain
3 points	Belarus
2 points	Switzerland
1 point	Denmark

==== Detailed voting results ====
The following members comprised the Lithuanian jury:

- Deivydas Zvonkus (jury chairperson) – composer
- Rūta Lukoševičiūtė – journalist, lyricist
- Povilas Varvuolis – radio DJ, television multicamera director
- Kristina Zmailaitė – opera singer
- Kristina Žaldokaitė – choir conductor, singer

Detailed voting results from Lithuania (Semi-final 2)
R/O	Country	D. Zvonkus	R. Lukoševičiūtė	P. Varvuolis	K. Zmailaitė	K. Žaldokaitė	Jury Rank	Televote Rank	Combined Rank	Points
01	Malta	5	7	4	7	6	5	13	10	1
02	Israel	7	13	6	8	7	8	11	12	
03	Norway	6	6	1	4	3	3	5	3	8
04	Georgia	12	12	7	14	2	10	3	5	6
05	Poland	13	14	14	13	9	14	2	7	4
06	Austria	1	1	3	1	5	1	6	2	10
07	Lithuania									
08	Finland	8	8	9	12	1	7	7	6	5
09	Ireland	14	11	13	11	14	13	10	13	
10	Belarus	3	3	2	2	4	2	1	1	12
11	Macedonia	10	10	10	9	12	12	14	14	
12	Switzerland	2	4	5	10	8	6	4	4	7
13	Greece	11	9	12	6	11	11	8	11	
14	Slovenia	4	2	8	3	10	4	12	8	3
15	Romania	9	5	11	5	13	9	9	9	2

Detailed voting results from Lithuania (Final)
R/O	Country	D. Zvonkus	R. Lukoševičiūtė	P. Varvuolis	K. Zmailaitė	K. Žaldokaitė	Jury Rank	Televote Rank	Combined Rank	Points
01	Ukraine	21	16	11	9	12	15	2	6	5
02	Belarus	12	18	22	5	22	17	3	8	3
03	Azerbaijan	23	9	9	8	8	9	17	12	
04	Iceland	5	10	4	11	6	5	19	11	
05	Norway	11	2	2	2	1	3	7	3	8
06	Romania	24	22	26	18	25	25	21	25	
07	Armenia	14	14	19	26	18	20	8	16	
08	Montenegro	20	20	14	12	24	19	26	24	
09	Poland	25	26	23	21	20	24	4	15	
10	Greece	22	25	25	22	23	26	14	21	
11	Austria	1	1	3	3	7	1	5	2	10
12	Germany	19	19	10	19	10	16	12	17	
13	Sweden	4	4	12	10	5	4	9	4	7
14	France	26	24	8	24	26	23	23	26	
15	Russia	7	5	20	13	13	10	6	5	6
16	Italy	17	23	21	14	21	21	24	23	
17	Slovenia	13	6	18	7	15	11	22	19	
18	Finland	6	11	5	16	4	7	20	14	
19	Spain	16	3	15	1	11	8	11	7	4
20	Switzerland	10	12	6	15	17	12	10	9	2
21	Hungary	3	13	13	25	14	14	13	13	
22	Malta	15	17	17	17	16	18	25	22	
23	Denmark	8	7	16	6	3	6	18	10	1
24	Netherlands	2	8	1	4	2	2	1	1	12
25	San Marino	18	15	24	23	19	22	15	20	
26	United Kingdom	9	21	7	20	9	13	16	18	
