= Lithuania in the Eurovision Song Contest 2008 =

- Eurovision Song Contest 2008
- Participating broadcaster: Lietuvos radijas ir televizija (LRT)
- Country: Lithuania
- Selection process: "Eurovizijos" dainų konkurso nacionalinė atranka
- Selection date: 2 February 2008

Competing entry
- Song: "Nomads in the Night"
- Artist: Jeronimas Milius
- Songwriters: Vytautas Diškevičius; Jeronimas Milius

Placement
- Semi-final result: Failed to qualify (16th)

Participation chronology

Lithuania was represented at the Eurovision Song Contest 2008 with the song "Nomads in the Night", composed by Vytautas Diškevičius, with lyrics by Jeronimas Milius, and performed by Milius himself. The Lithuanian participating broadcaster, Lietuvos radijas ir televizija (LRT), organised the national final "Eurovizijos" dainų konkurso nacionalinė atranka in order to select its entry for the contest. The national final took place over four weeks and involved 34 competing entries. Entries that advanced in the competition were determined by the combination of votes from a jury panel and a public vote. In the final, fourteen entries remained and a public vote entirely selected "Nomads in the Night" performed by Jeronimas Milius as the winner with 11,674 votes.

Lithuania was drawn to compete in the second semi-final of the Eurovision Song Contest which took place on 22 May 2008. Performing during the show in position 5, "Nomads in the Night" was not announced among the 10 qualifying entries of the second semi-final and therefore did not qualify to compete in the final. It was later revealed that Lithuania placed sixteenth out of the 19 participating countries in the semi-final with 30 points.

== Background ==
Prior to the 2008 contest, Lietuvos radijas ir televizija (LRT) had participated in the Eurovision Song Contest representing Lithuania eight times since its first entry in 1994. Its best placing in the contest was sixth, achieved in 2006 with the song "We Are the Winners" performed by LT United. Following the introduction of semi-finals in 2004, Lithuania, to this point, had managed to qualify to the final two times. In 2007, "Love or Leave" performed by 4Fun automatically qualified to the final where the song scored 28 points and placed 21st.

As part of its duties as participating broadcaster, LRT organises the selection of its entry in the Eurovision Song Contest and broadcasts the event in the country. Other than the internal selection of its debut entry in 1994, the broadcaster has selected its entry consistently through a national final procedure. LRT confirmed its intentions to participate at the 2008 contest on 29 October 2007 and announced the organization of "Eurovizijos" dainų konkurso nacionalinė atranka, which would be the national final to select its entry for the contest.

== Before Eurovision ==
=== "Eurovizijos" dainų konkurso nacionalinė atranka ===
"Eurovizijos" dainų konkurso nacionalinė atranka (Eurovision Song Contest national selection) was the national final format developed by LRT in order to select its entry for the Eurovision Song Contest 2008. The competition involved a four-week-long process that commenced on 12 January 2008 and concluded with a winning song and artist on 2 February 2008. The four shows took place at the LRT studios in Vilnius and were broadcast on LTV, LTV World, and Lietuvos Radijas, as well as online via the broadcaster's website lrt.lt.

==== Format ====
LRT downsized the format of the national final from that of previous years. The 2008 competition involved 34 entries and consisted of four shows. 32 of the entries participated in the first three shows, which were the semi-finals. Each semi-final consisted of ten or twelve entries each and the top four proceeded to the final. The results of the semi-finals were determined by the 50/50 combination of votes from a three-member jury panel and public televoting. Each jury member had an equal stake in the final result and the public televote had a weighting equal to the votes of three jury members. Ties were decided in favour of the entry that received the most votes from the public. An additional two artists that entered the competition were established with prior Eurovision experience, having participated in the Lithuanian national final in previous years, and therefore their entries competed directly in the final. In the final, the winner was selected from the remaining fourteen entries solely by public televoting. The public could vote through telephone and SMS voting.

==== Competing entries ====
LRT opened a submission period on 29 October 2007 for artists and songwriters to submit their entries with the deadline on 10 December 2007. On 4 January 2008, LRT announced the 36 entries selected for the competition from 73 submissions received. Two of the selected entries were entered by established artists and automatically advanced to the final: "Troy on Fire" performed by Aistė Pilvelytė and "To My Soul" performed by Julija and Girma. Julija represented Lithuania in 2007 as part of 4Fun. The final changes to the list of 36 competing acts were later made with withdrawal of the song "Let's Sing It" performed by Vudis and Grūdas on 16 January 2008 and the disqualification of the song "Final Shot" performed by Suicide DJ's on 23 February 2008, due to it being publicly performed before 1 October 2007.

Artist	Song	Songwriter(s)
Aistė Pilvelytė	"Troy on Fire"	Rafael Artesero
Angelas	"Little Sunshine"	Ramūnas Grybauskas
Asta	"Man vis tiek"	Asta Kairytė
Augustė	"Do Somethin'"	Augustė Vedrickaitė
Buzzer's	"Tell Me"	Ričardas Mikalajūnas
Cisco Kid	"1 Million Euros"	Lex de Groot, Johan De Maeyer, Francis van Mechelen
Eglė Lokytė	"Message in the Sky"	Linas Adomaitis
Face Time	"Celebrate"	Jurgis Brūzga, Eduardas Armonas
Flaer	"New Love Story"	Adomas Stančikas
Flaxon	"Lietuva man kaip Paryžius"	Simonas Patkevičius
Funny Beat	"Evertown"	Linas Adomaitis, Camden-MS
GYVAI	"Paukštis"	Milda Krikščiūnaitė
Ingrida Paukštytė	"I Will Fight"	Ingrida Paukštytė, Vladas Grankinas
Ingrida Žiliūtė	"You & I"	Marijus Adomaitis
Jeronimas Milius	"Nomads in the Night"	Jeronimas Milius
Julija and Girma	"To My Soul"	Julija Ritčik
Justina Adeikytė	"Calling Your Name"	Justina Adeikytė, Laura Remeikienė
Justinas Lapatinskas	"Muziką garsiau!"	Oleg Jerochin, Eimantas Gardauskas
Kaštonai	"The Farmer's Daughter"	Aušrys Kriščiūnas, Povilas Sabaliauskas, Oleg Semionov
Kristina Botyriūtė	"Life Is Joyful"	Kristina Botyriūtė
Laiptai	"Aš rasiu"	Rūta Lukoševičiūtė, Audrius Grinevičius
Mini-Me	"Yes"	Eglė Junevičiūtė, Lukas Pačkauskas
MyMagic	"Lady"	Stefan Engel, Gorgi
Nerri	"Step Into This World"	Neringa Žiliūtė, Andrius Bernatonis
Onsa	"What's Wrong"	Tautrimas Rupulevičius
Pokeris	"Stone"	Kamilė Kielaitė, Laimonas Vaižvila
Raimonda Masiulytė	"Birdie's Tweet"	Raimonda Masiulytė, Oleg Jerochin
Sasha Son	"Miss Kiss"	Egidijus Dragūnas
Skyders	"Neo(e)litas"	Justas Jarutis, Tomas Šileika
Slapjack	"Light"	Dalius Pletnovias
Sweetness Theory	"Sun In Her Eyes"	Artūros Bulota, Šarūnas Kramilius
Trylika	"I Deceive You"	Darius Juška
Vilma Voroblevaitė	"Vakaras"	Vilma Voroblevaitė
Wake Up	"Don't Stop Me"	Aušra Sutkauskaitė

==== Semi-finals ====
The three semi-finals of the competition aired on 12, 19, and 26 January 2008 and featured the 32 competing entries. The semi-finals were hosted by Rolandas Vilkončius. The members of the jury consisted of Darius Užkuraitis (musicologist, Opus 3 director), Neda Malunavičiūtė (singer), and Robertas Aleksaitis (actor) in the first semi-final, Vytautas Juozapaitis (opera singer), Aras Vėberis (producer), and Jurijus Smoriginas (choreographer) in the second semi-final, and Alanas Chošnau (singer-songwriter), Rosita Čivilytė (singer), and Zita Kelmickaitė (musicologist) in the third semi-final. The top four entries advanced to the final from each semi-final, while the bottom entries were eliminated.

Semi-final 1 – 12 January 2008
R/O	Artist	Song	Jury	Televote		Total	Place
R/O	Artist	Song	Jury	Votes	Points	Total	Place
1	Justinas Lapatinskas	"Muziką garsiau!"	30	236	9	39	3
2	Kaštonai	"The Farmer's Daughter"	2	137	3	5	11
3	Cisco Kid	"1 Million Euros"	17	172	6	23	8
4	Onsa	"What's Wrong"	14	115	0	14	10
5	Laiptai	"Aš rasiu"	7	890	30	37	4
6	Eglė Lokytė	"Message in the Sky"	15	283	12	27	7
7	GYVAI	"Paukštis"	13	678	24	37	5
8	Buzzer's	"Tell Me"	0	119	0	0	12
9	Vilma Voroblevaitė	"Vakaras"	24	463	18	42	2
10	Asta	"Man vis tiek"	1	473	21	22	9
11	Wake Up	"Don't Stop Me"	15	297	15	30	6
12	Jeronimas Milius	"Nomads in the Night"	36	2,394	36	72	1

Semi-final 2 – 19 January 2008
R/O	Artist	Song	Jury	Televote		Total	Place
R/O	Artist	Song	Jury	Votes	Points	Total	Place
1	Kristina Botyriūtė	"Life Is Joyful"	8	280	12	20	8
2	Face Time	"Celebrate"	20	306	15	25	6
3	Angelas	"Little Sunshine"	3	85	3	6	10
4	Funny Beat	"Evertown"	22	889	24	46	3
5	Sasha Son	"Miss Kiss"	36	1,738	36	72	1
6	Flaer	"New Love Story"	12	227	9	21	7
7	Ingrida Žiliūtė	"You & I"	20	348	18	38	4
8	Raimonda Masiulytė	"Birdie's Tweet"	30	1,150	30	60	2
9	Flaxon	"Lietuva man kaip Paryžius"	7	122	6	13	9
10	Justina Adeikytė	"Calling Your Name"	16	698	21	37	5

Semi-final 3 – 26 January 2008
R/O	Artist	Song	Jury	Televote		Total	Place
R/O	Artist	Song	Jury	Votes	Points	Total	Place
1	Slapjack	"Light"	16	280	12	28	7
2	MyMagic	"Lady"	17	285	15	32	5
3	Skyders	"Neo(e)litas"	16	132	6	22	8
4	Ingrida Paukštytė	"I Will Fight"	4	152	9	13	9
5	Sweetness Theory	"Sun In Her Eyes"	11	374	18	29	6
6	Nerri	"Step Into This World"	17	550	24	41	3
7	Trylika	"I Deceive You"	9	123	3	12	10
8	Augustė	"Do Somethin'"	36	969	30	66	1
9	Pokeris	"Stone"	20	412	21	41	4
10	Mini-Me	"Yes"	28	2,164	36	64	2

==== Final ====
The final of the competition took place on 2 February 2008 and was hosted by Giedrius Masalskis and Gabrielė Bartkutė. The show featured the remaining twelve entries that qualified from the three semi-finals alongside the two automatic qualifiers, and "Nomads in the Night" performed by Jeronimas Milius was selected as the winner after gaining the most votes from the public. In addition to the performances of the competing entries, Ruslan Alekhno performed the 2008 Belarusian Eurovision entry "Hasta la vista" as the interval act.

Final – 2 February 2008
R/O	Artist	Song	Televote	Place
1	Ingrida Žiliūtė	"You and I"	638	9
2	Vilma Voroblevaitė	"Vakaras"	247	14
3	Julija and Girma	"To My Soul"	466	12
4	Laiptai	"Aš rasiu"	1,216	8
5	Funny Beat	"Evertown"	1,677	7
6	Augustė	"Do Somethin'"	5,145	6
7	Mini Me	"Yes"	5,936	5
8	Pokeris	"Stone"	633	10
9	Justinas Lapatinskas	"Muziką garsiau!"	299	13
10	Jeronimas Milius	"Nomads in the Night"	11,674	1
11	Aistė Pilvelytė	"Troy on Fire"	11,242	2
12	Sasha Son	"Miss Kiss"	8,306	3
13	Raimonda Masiulytė	"Birdie's Tweet"	7,391	4
14	Nerri	"Step Into This World"	610	11

=== Promotion ===
Jeronimas Milius specifically promoted "Nomads in the Night" as the Lithuanian Eurovision entry by performing the song during the final of the Latvian Eurovision national final Eirodziesma 2008 on 1 March 2008.

== At Eurovision ==
It was announced in September 2007 that the competition's format would be expanded to two semi-finals in 2008. According to Eurovision rules, all nations with the exceptions of the host country and the "Big Four" (France, Germany, Spain, and the United Kingdom) are required to qualify from one of two semi-finals in order to compete for the final; the top nine songs from each semi-final as determined by televoting progress to the final, and a tenth was determined by back-up juries. The European Broadcasting Union (EBU) split up the competing countries into six different pots based on voting patterns from previous contests, with countries with favourable voting histories put into the same pot. On 28 January 2008, a special allocation draw was held which placed each country into one of the two semi-finals. Lithuania was placed into the second semi-final, to be held on 22 May 2008. The running order for the semi-finals was decided through another draw on 17 March 2008 and Lithuania was set to perform in position 5, following the entry from Ukraine and before the entry from Albania.

The two semi-finals and final were broadcast in Lithuania on LTV and LTV World with commentary by Darius Užkuraitis. LRT appointed Rolandas Vilkončius as its spokesperson to announce the Lithuanian votes during the final.

=== Semi-final ===
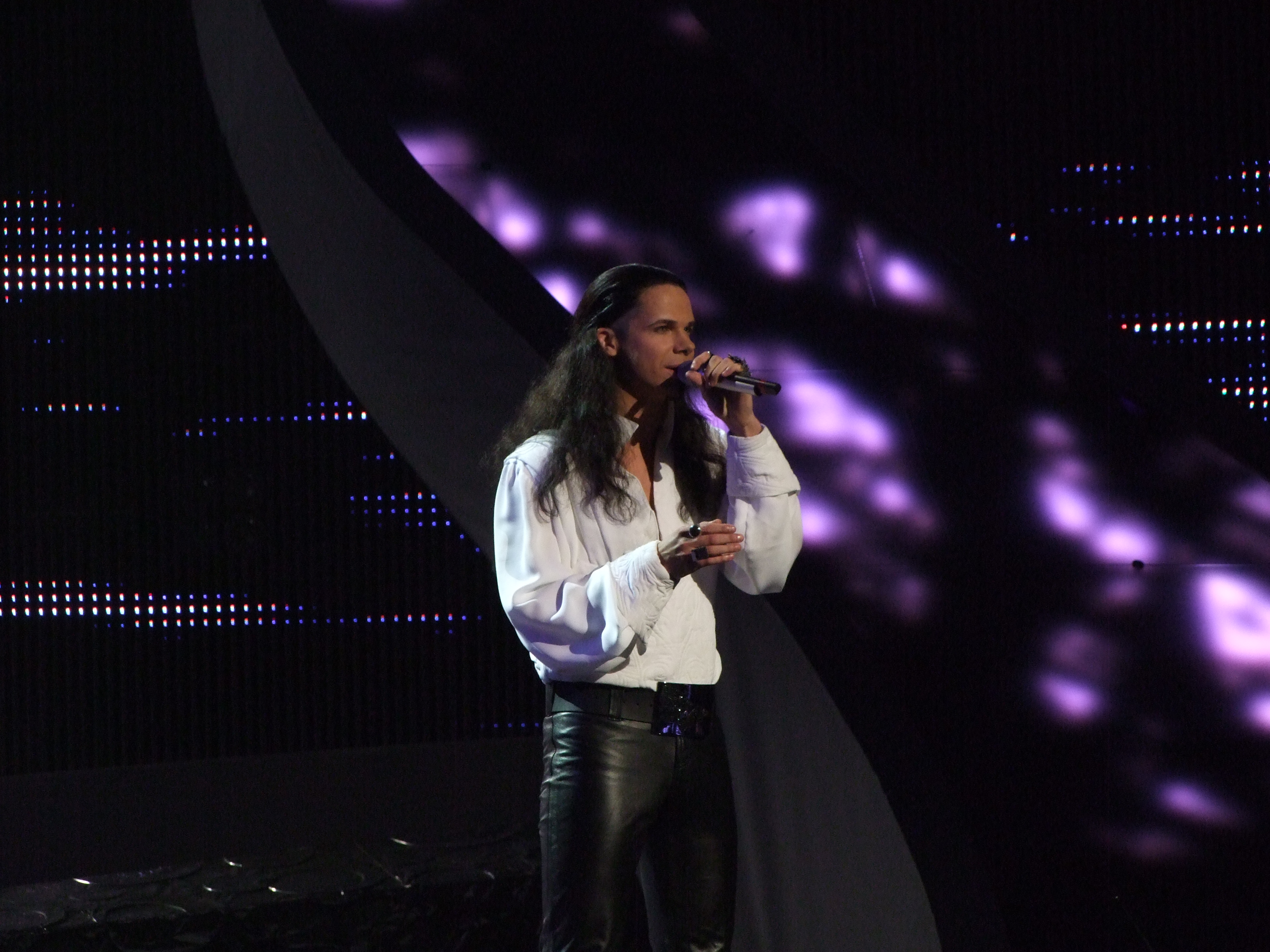
Jeronimas Milius during a rehearsal before the second semi-final

Jeronimas Milius took part in technical rehearsals on 14 and 18 May, followed by dress rehearsals on 21 and 22 May. The Lithuanian performance featured Jeronimas Milius performing on stage alone with dark blue stage colours and the LED screens displaying a shining moon. The performance also featured smoke effects. At the end of the show, Lithuania was not announced among the top 10 entries in the second semi-final and therefore failed to qualify to compete in the final. It was later revealed that Lithuania placed sixteenth in the semi-final, receiving a total of 30 points.

=== Voting ===
Below is a breakdown of points awarded to Lithuania and awarded by Lithuania in the semi-final and grand final of the contest. The nation awarded its 12 points to Latvia in the semi-final and to Russia in the final of the contest.

==== Points awarded to Lithuania ====
Points awarded to Lithuania (Semi-final 2)
Score	Country
12 points	Latvia
10 points	Georgia
8 points	United Kingdom
7 points	
6 points	
5 points	
4 points	
3 points	
2 points	
1 point	

==== Points awarded by Lithuania ====
Points awarded by Lithuania (Semi-final 2)
Score	Country
12 points	Latvia
10 points	Georgia
8 points	Denmark
7 points	Ukraine
6 points	Belarus
5 points	Croatia
4 points	Portugal
3 points	Sweden
2 points	Iceland
1 point	Bulgaria

Points awarded by Lithuania (Final)
Score	Country
12 points	Russia
10 points	Latvia
8 points	France
7 points	Azerbaijan
6 points	Ukraine
5 points	Georgia
4 points	Norway
3 points	Israel
2 points	Denmark
1 point	Sweden
