= Lithuania in the Eurovision Song Contest 2010 =

- Eurovision Song Contest 2010
- Participating broadcaster: Lietuvos radijas ir televizija (LRT)
- Country: Lithuania
- Selection process: "Eurovizijos" dainų konkurso nacionalinė atranka
- Selection date: 4 March 2010

Competing entry
- Song: "Eastern European Funk"
- Artist: InCulto
- Songwriters: InCulto

Placement
- Semi-final result: Failed to qualify (12th)

Participation chronology

Lithuania was represented at the Eurovision Song Contest 2010 with the song "Eastern European Funk", written and performed by the group InCulto. The Lithuanian participating broadcaster, Lietuvos radijas ir televizija (LRT), organised the national final "Eurovizijos" dainų konkurso nacionalinė atranka (Eurovision Song Contest national selection) in order to select its entry for the contest. The national final took place over four weeks and involved 34 competing entries. The results of each show were determined by the combination of votes from a jury panel and a public vote. In the final, twelve artists and songs remained and "Eastern European Funk", performed by InCulto, was selected as the winner.

Lithuania was drawn to compete in the second semi-final of the Eurovision Song Contest, which took place on 27 May 2010. Performing as the opening entry for the show in position 1, "Eastern European Funk" was not announced among the top 10 entries of the second semi-final and therefore did not qualify to compete in the final. It was later revealed that Lithuania placed twelfth out of the 17 participating countries in the semi-final with 44 points.

== Background ==
Prior to the 2010 contest, Lietuvos radijas ir televizija (LRT) had participated in the Eurovision Song Contest representing Lithuania ten times since its first entry in 1994. Its best placing in the contest was sixth, achieved in 2006 with the song "We Are the Winners" performed by LT United. Following the introduction of semi-finals in 2004, Lithuania, to this point, had managed to qualify for the final three times. In 2009, "Love" performed by Sasha Son qualified to the final, where the song scored 23 points and placed 23rd.

As part of its duties as participating broadcaster, LRT organises the selection of its entry in the Eurovision Song Contest and broadcasts the event in the country. Other than the internal selection of their debut entry in 1994, the broadcaster has selected its entry consistently through a national final procedure. On 15 December 2009, LRT announced that it would not participate in the 2010 contest due to financial problems. However, the broadcaster confirmed its participation on 6 January 2010 and announced the organization of "Eurovizijos" dainų konkurso nacionalinė atranka, which would be the national final to select its entry, after receiving funding from the company Teo LT. Nerijus Ivanauskas, deputy director of Teo LT, stated: "It was decided to support LRT for two reasons: the international image of Lithuania and Teo LT digital development".

== Before Eurovision ==
=== "Eurovizijos" dainų konkurso nacionalinė atranka ===
"Eurovizijos" dainų konkurso nacionalinė atranka (Eurovision Song Contest national selection) was the national final format developed by LRT in order to select its entry for the Eurovision Song Contest 2010. The competition involved a four-week-long process that commenced on 13 February 2010 and concluded with a winning song and artist on 27 February 2010. The four shows took place at the LRT studios in Vilnius and were hosted by Giedrius Masalskis. The shows were broadcast on LTV, LTV World, and Lietuvos Radijas, as well as online via the broadcaster's website lrt.lt. The final was also streamed online on the official Eurovision Song Contest website eurovision.tv.

==== Format ====
The 2010 competition involved 34 entries and consisted of four shows. The first three shows were the semi-finals, consisting of eleven or twelve entries each. The top three entries proceeded to the final from each semi-final, while LRT also selected three wildcard acts for the final out of the remaining non-qualifying acts from the semi-finals. In the final, the winner was selected from the remaining twelve entries. Monetary prizes were also awarded to the top three artists by the Lithuanian Copyright Protection Association (LATGA). The winner received 15,000 LTL, while the second place received 7,000 LTL and the third place received 3,000 LTL.

The results of each of the four shows were determined by the 50/50 combination of votes from a jury panel and public televoting. The ranking developed by both streams of voting was converted to points from 1-8, 10 and 12 and assigned based on the number of competing songs in the respective show. The public could vote through telephone and SMS voting. Ties in all shows were decided in favour of the entry that received the most votes from the public.

==== Competing entries ====
LRT opened a submission period on 6 January 2010 for artists and songwriters to submit their entries with the deadline on 24 January 2010. On 1 February 2010, LRT announced the 36 entries selected for the competition from 81 submissions received. Among the artists were previous Lithuanian Eurovision contestants 4Fun, which represented Lithuania in 2007, and Sasha Song, who represented Lithuania in 2009. On 27 February 2010, the final changes to the list of 36 competing acts were made with the withdrawal of the songs "Nupirkta pasaka", performed by Donata Virbilaitė, and "Faces", performed by Vanilla Soud.

Competing entries
Artist	Song	Songwriter(s)
4Fun	"Don't You Know"	Julija Ritčik
Agama	"Field of Kings"	Violeta Jurkonienė, Vyasadeva
Aistė Pilvelytė	"Melancolia"	Rafael Artesero
Amberlife	"Material World"	Edgaras Lubys
Audrius Zavadskis	"Right Now"	Georgios Kalpakidis
Avenue Acoustic	"Aklomis myliu tavo vardą"	Karolis Jančenkovas
The Cavaliers	"We Are About to Love"	Laura Tarulytė, Svajūnas Mackevičius
Daina Bilevičiūtė	"Myliu gyventi"	Virginija Paulauskienė, Ąžuolas Paulauskas
Donatas Montvydas	"Running Fast"	Donatas Montvydas
Eden	"Nirvana"	Marina Sorohan, Andrej Viazinin
Eva	"Nes tu pamiršai"	Eimantas Gardauskas, Oleg Jerochin
Evelina Sašenko	"For This I'll Pray"	Andrius Kairys, Florian Scharnofske
Gabrielė	"Girl"	Raigardas Tautkus, Raimundas Jankauskas
Gaudentas Janušas	"Man nieko nereikia"	Gaudentas Janušas
Imantas	"Won't U Come Back"	Ąžuolas Paulauskas
InCulto	"Eastern European Funk"	InCulto
Jūratė Miliauskaitė	"Let It Rain"	Leif Goldkuhl, Kjell Jennstig
Kafka, Rūta and Kivi	"Tonight"	Niall Mooney, Jonas Gladnikoff, Christina Schilling, Brendan McCarthy
Mariaana Seppern	"My Home is Europe"	Mariaana Seppern, Arthur Seppern
Marta Lukošiūtė	"Meilės ruduo"	Dalia Teišerskytė, Jaroslavas Cechanovičius
Merūnas	"Rosa"	Raigardus Tautkus, Raimundas Jankauskas
Mindaugas Mickevičius-Mino	"Angela"	Mindaugaus Mickevičius
Mini Me	"Amžinai"	Egidijus Remeikis, Vutis Smolskas, Lukas Pačkauskas
Monika Linkytė	"Give Away"	Monika Liubinaitė, Mario Basanov
Mundis and Electric Ladies	"Sielos muzika"	Stanislavas Stavickis, Mundis
Onsa	"Will You Be My Wife"	Tautrimas Rupulevičius, Marius Leskauskas
Raimonda Masiulytė	"Ledinė širdis"	Aurelijus Sirgedas, Raimonda Masiulytė
Ramūnas Difartas	"Blues of Life"	Ramūnas Difartas, Austra Sutkauskaitė
Ruslanas Kirilkinas	"I Love a Boy Who's in Love With a Fairytale"	Stanislav Stavickis
Sasha Song and Nora	"Say Yes to Life"	Dmitrij Šavrov
Saulės kliošas	"Tu atėjai"	Monika Žiauberytė, Saulės kliošas
Širdelės	"Aš ir tu"	Žilvinas Liulys
Soliaris	"So High"	Algimantas Minalga, Justina Chachlauskas
Urtė Šilagalytė	"Angelai"	Urtė Šilagalytė

==== Jury members ====
The jury panel in the semi-finals and the final consisted of five members.

Jury members by show
Jury member	Semi-finals			Final	Occupation(s)
Jury member	1	2	3	Final	Occupation(s)
Aistė Smilgevičiūtė	No	No	Yes	No	singer
Artūras Novikas	No	No	No	Yes	musician
Darius Užkuraitis	Yes	Yes	Yes	Yes	musicologist, Opus 3 director
Jonas Vilimas	Yes	Yes	Yes	Yes	producer
Kazimieras Šiaulys	No	Yes	No	No	presenter
Linas Rimša	Yes	No	No	No	composer, jazz singer
Mindaugas Urbaitis	Yes	Yes	Yes	Yes	composer
Neda Malunavičiūtė	Yes	No	No	No	singer
Povilas Meškėla	No	No	Yes	No	musician
Rosita Čivilytė	No	No	No	Yes	singer
Saulius Urbonavičius	No	Yes	No	No	producer

==== Semi-finals ====
The three semi-finals of the competition aired on 13, 20, and 27 February 2010 and featured the 34 competing entries. The top three entries advanced to the final from each semi-final, while the bottom entries were eliminated. On 22 February 2010, LRT announced the three entries that had received a wildcard to also proceed to the final.

On 22 February 2010, "Running Fast" performed by Donatas Montvydas, which advanced from the second semi-final, was disqualified as the song had been publicly performed before 1 October 2009. The song "Material World" performed by Amberlife, which placed fourth in the second semi-final, replaced the song and advanced to the final.

Key

Qualifier Wildcard qualifier Entry disqualified

Semi-final 1 – 13 February 2010
R/O	Artist	Song	Jury		Televote		Total	Place
R/O	Artist	Song	Votes	Points	Votes	Points	Total	Place
1	Kafka, Rūta and Kivi	"Tonight"	30	6	410	6	12	4
2	Mindaugas Mickevičius-Mino	"Angela"	19	4	384	5	9	6
3	Monika Linkytė	"Give Away"	36	8	719	7	15	3
4	Gabrielė	"Girl"	12	2	933	8	10	5
5	Avenue Acoustic	"Aklomis myliu tavo vardą"	36	8	91	1	9	6
6	Imantas	"Won't U Come Back"	16	3	126	3	6	9
7	Onsa	"Will You Be My Wife"	12	2	111	2	4	10
8	Daina Bilevičiūtė	"Myliu gyventi"	0	0	62	0	0	11
9	Sasha Song and Nora	"Say Yes to Life"	54	12	955	10	22	2
10	Urtė Šilagalytė	"Angelai"	26	5	366	4	9	6
11	Aistė Pilvelytė	"Melancolia"	50	10	3,645	12	22	1

Semi-final 2 – 20 February 2010
R/O	Artist	Song	Jury		Televote		Total	Place
R/O	Artist	Song	Votes	Points	Votes	Points	Total	Place
1	Mariaana Seppern	"My Home is Europe"	0	0	388	4	4	9
2	Mundis and Electric Ladies	"Sielos muzika"	19	3	1,504	10	13	5
3	Raimonda Masiulytė	"Ledinė širdis"	10	1	97	0	1	11
4	Agama	"Field of Kings"	48	10	1,224	8	18	2
5	Audrius Zavadskis	"Right Now"	21	4	333	3	7	8
6	Ruslanas Kirilkinas	"I Love a Boy Who's in Love With a Fairytale"	31	7	988	7	14	3
7	Marta Lukošiūtė	"Meilės ruduo"	19	3	193	1	5	9
8	Amberlife	"Material World"	46	8	487	6	14	4
9	Saulės kliošas	"Tu atėjai"	22	6	443	5	11	6
10	Mini Me	"Amžinai"	22	6	308	2	8	7
11	~~Donatas Montvydas~~	~~"Running Fast"~~	~~52~~	~~12~~	~~1,705~~	~~12~~	~~24~~	~~1~~

Semi-final 3 – 27 February 2010
R/O	Artist	Song	Jury		Televote		Total	Place
R/O	Artist	Song	Votes	Points	Votes	Points	Total	Place
1	Ramūnas Difartas	"Blues of Life"	50	12	309	2	14	4
2	Soliaris	"So High"	7	2	1,506	10	12	5
3	The Cavaliers	"We Are About to Love"	22	3	358	3	6	9
4	Eden	"Nirvana"	28	5	601	5	10	7
5	Eva	"Nes tu pamiršai"	5	0	231	1	1	11
6	Merūnas	"Rosa"	35	8	1,438	7	15	3
7	Širdelės	"Aš ir tu"	0	0	92	0	0	12
8	Gaudentas Janušas	"Man nieko nereikia"	6	1	786	6	7	8
9	4Fun	"Don't You Know"	25	4	171	0	4	10
10	InCulto	"Eastern European Funk"	31	6	1,825	12	18	1
11	Evelina Sašenko	"For This I'll Pray"	49	10	1,475	8	18	2
12	Jūratė Miliauskaitė	"Let It Rain"	34	7	521	4	11	6

==== Final ====
The final of the competition took place on 4 March 2010 and featured the remaining twelve entries that qualified from the semi-finals. The final was the only show in the competition to be broadcast live; all other preceding shows were pre-recorded earlier in the week before their airdates. "Eastern European Funk" performed by InCulto was selected as the winner after gaining the most points from both the jury vote and the public vote.

Final – 4 March 2010
R/O	Artist	Song	Jury		Televote		Total	Place
R/O	Artist	Song	Votes	Points	Votes	Points	Total	Place
1	Agama	"Field of Kings"	41	8	2,778	5	13	4
2	Aistė Pilvelytė	"Melancolia"	42	10	17,447	10	20	2
3	Ruslanas Kirilkinas	"I Love a Boy Who's in Love With a Fairytale"	15	3	1,301	4	7	7
4	Merūnas	"Rosa"	23	5	4,135	7	12	6
5	Ramūnas Difartas	"Blues of Life"	29	6	345	0	6	8
6	Monika Linkytė	"Give Away"	5	0	1,256	3	3	10
7	InCulto	"Eastern European Funk"	47	12	23,767	12	24	1
8	Evelina Sašenko	"For This I'll Pray"	41	8	3,257	6	14	3
9	Sasha Song and Nora	"Say Yes to Life"	22	4	4,418	8	12	5
10	Jūratė Miliauskaitė	"Let It Rain"	8	1	388	0	1	12
11	Eden	"Nirvana"	10	2	785	2	4	9
12	Amberlife	"Material World"	7	0	476	1	1	11

=== Promotion ===
Sponsored by the company ACME Baltija, InCulto conducted a promotional tour across Europe to specifically promote "Eastern European Funk" as the Lithuanian Eurovision entry. On 6 April, InCulto began their tour in Oslo, Norway, where they performed at the Hard Rock Cafe and the Queens Pub. InCulto then took part in promotional activities in Armenia on 14 April, where they performed at the Yerevan Republic Square, as well as in Tbilisi, Georgia between 15 and 16 April. Between 21 and 22 April, InCulto took part in promotional activities in Ukraine by giving interviews to local media, making television and radio appearances, and performing in Kyiv at the Bochka Khmelnaya club, on the Khreshchatyk central street, and at the Embassy of Lithuania. On 24 April, InCulto performed during the Eurovision in Concert event, which was held at the Lexion venue in Zaanstad, Netherlands, and hosted by Cornald Maas and Marga Bult. On 1 May, InCulto performed at the Cuba Cafe in Riga, Latvia and appeared on Radio SWH. As part of the promotional tour, InCulto also held promotional activities in Bulgaria, Croatia, Estonia, Romania, Serbia, and Slovenia between 3 and 12 May. In Croatia, the group held a concert at the Ban Jelačić Square in Zagreb and took part in the "Women in High Heels Race" event.

In addition to their international appearances, three farewell concerts were held in Kaunas, Klaipėda, and Vilnius between 13 and 15 May before InCulto travelled to Oslo for the contest.

== At Eurovision ==
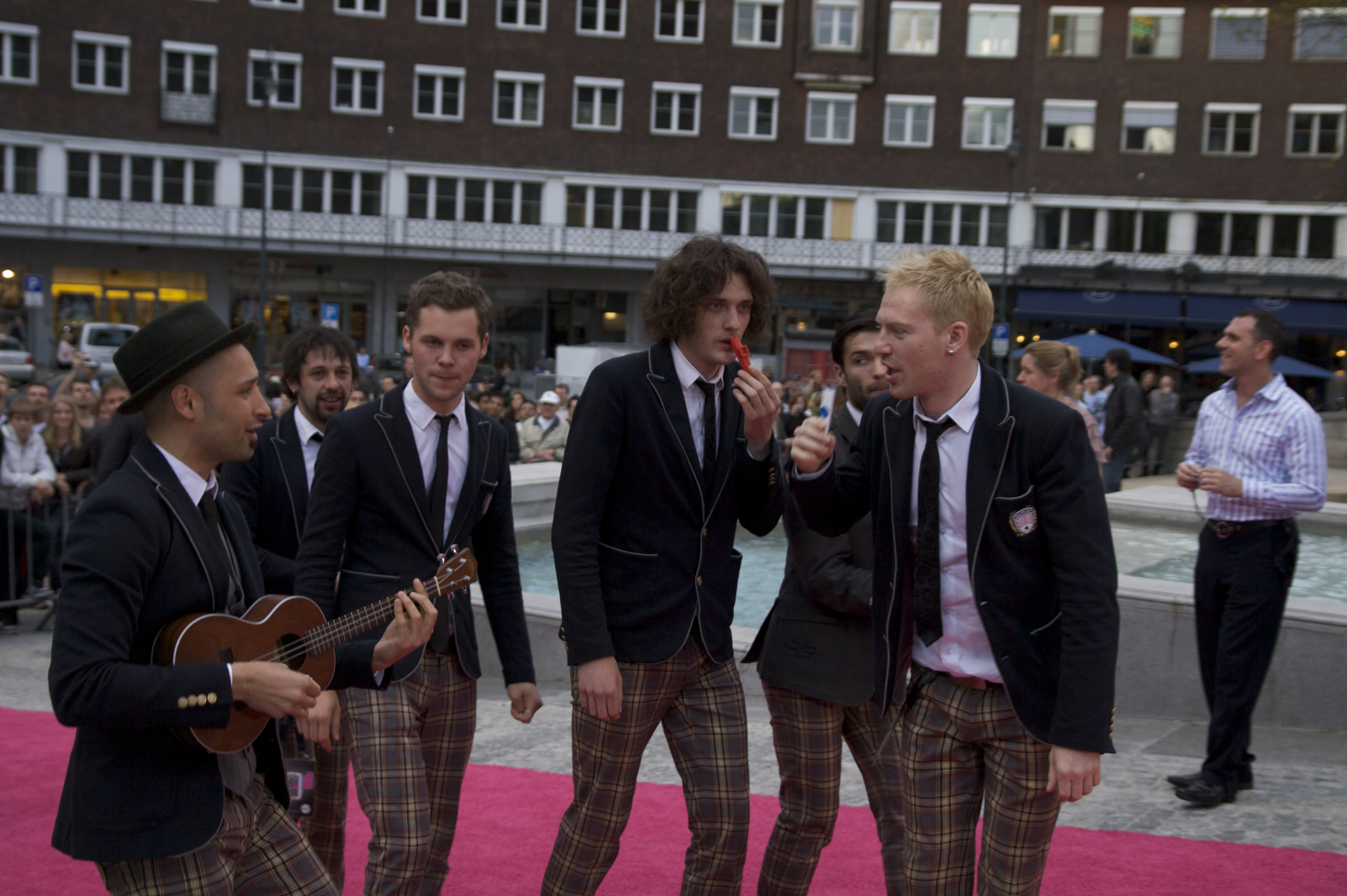
InCulto at the Eurovision Opening Party in Oslo

According to Eurovision rules, all nations with the exceptions of the host country and the "Big Four" (France, Germany, Spain and the United Kingdom) were required to qualify from one of two semi-finals in order to compete for the final; the top ten countries from each semi-final progress to the final. The European Broadcasting Union (EBU) split up the competing countries into six different pots based on voting patterns from previous contests, with countries with favourable voting histories put into the same pot. On 7 February 2010, an allocation draw was held which placed each country into one of the two semi-finals, as well as which half of the show they would perform in. Lithuania was placed into the second semi-final, to be held on 27 May 2010, and was scheduled to perform in the first half of the show. The running order for the semi-finals was decided through another draw on 23 March 2010 and Lithuania was set to open the show and perform in position 1, before the entry from Armenia.

The two semi-finals and final were broadcast in Lithuania on LTV and LTV World with commentary by Darius Užkuraitis. The Lithuanian spokesperson who announced the Lithuanian votes during the final was Giedrius Masalskis.

=== Semi-final ===
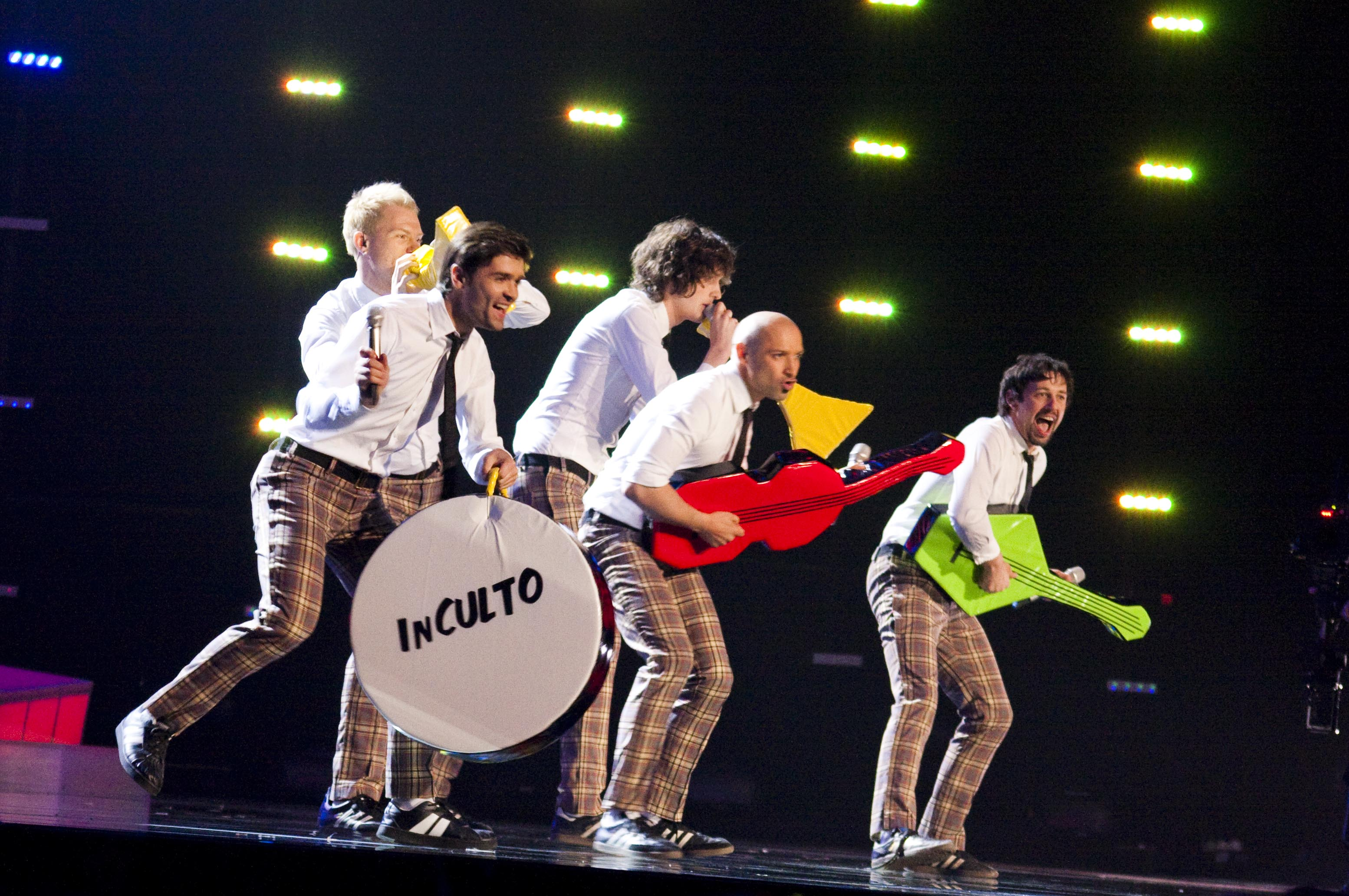
InCulto during a rehearsal before the second semi-final

InCulto took part in technical rehearsals on 18 and 21 May, followed by dress rehearsals on 26 and 27 May. This included the jury show on 26 May where the professional juries of each country watched and voted on the competing entries.

The Lithuanian performance featured the members of InCulto performing synchronised dance moves on stage dressed in white shirts with black ties and brown tartan patterned trousers. The performance also featured the members of InCulto mimic playing inflatable musical instruments in different colours and throwing off their trousers prior to the last refrain to reveal glittery silver boxer shorts. The stage colours transitioned from blue, red, white, and yellow to pink and white.

At the end of the show, Lithuania was not announced among the top 10 entries in the second semi-final and therefore failed to qualify to compete in the final. It was later revealed that Lithuania placed twelfth in the semi-final, receiving a total of 44 points.

=== Voting ===
Voting during the three shows consisted of 50 percent public televoting and 50 percent from a jury deliberation. The jury consisted of five music industry professionals who were citizens of the country they represent. This jury was asked to judge each contestant based on: vocal capacity; the stage performance; the song's composition and originality; and the overall impression by the act. In addition, no member of a national jury could be related in any way to any of the competing acts in such a way that they cannot vote impartially and independently.

Following the release of the full split voting by the EBU after the conclusion of the competition, it was revealed that the Lithuania had placed eighth with the public televote and thirteenth with the jury vote in the second semi-final. In the public vote, Lithuania scored 65 points, while with the jury vote, Lithuania scored 27 points.

Below is a breakdown of points awarded to Lithuania and awarded by Lithuania in the second semi-final and grand final of the contest. The nation awarded its 12 points to Georgia in the semi-final and the final of the contest.

==== Points awarded to Lithuania ====
Points awarded to Lithuania (Semi-final 2)
Score	Country
12 points	Ireland
10 points	
8 points	Georgia
7 points	United Kingdom
6 points	
5 points	Norway
4 points	Sweden
3 points	
2 points	Armenia; Cyprus; Ukraine
1 point	Croatia; Denmark

==== Points awarded by Lithuania ====
Points awarded by Lithuania (Semi-final 2)
Score	Country
12 points	Georgia
10 points	Ukraine
8 points	Turkey
7 points	Ireland
6 points	Romania
5 points	Denmark
4 points	Cyprus
3 points	Sweden
2 points	Azerbaijan
1 point	Armenia

Points awarded by Lithuania (Final)
Score	Country
12 points	Georgia
10 points	Germany
8 points	Spain
7 points	Belgium
6 points	Ukraine
5 points	Russia
4 points	Turkey
3 points	Denmark
2 points	Romania
1 point	Cyprus
