= Jeronimas Milius =

Lithuanian singer

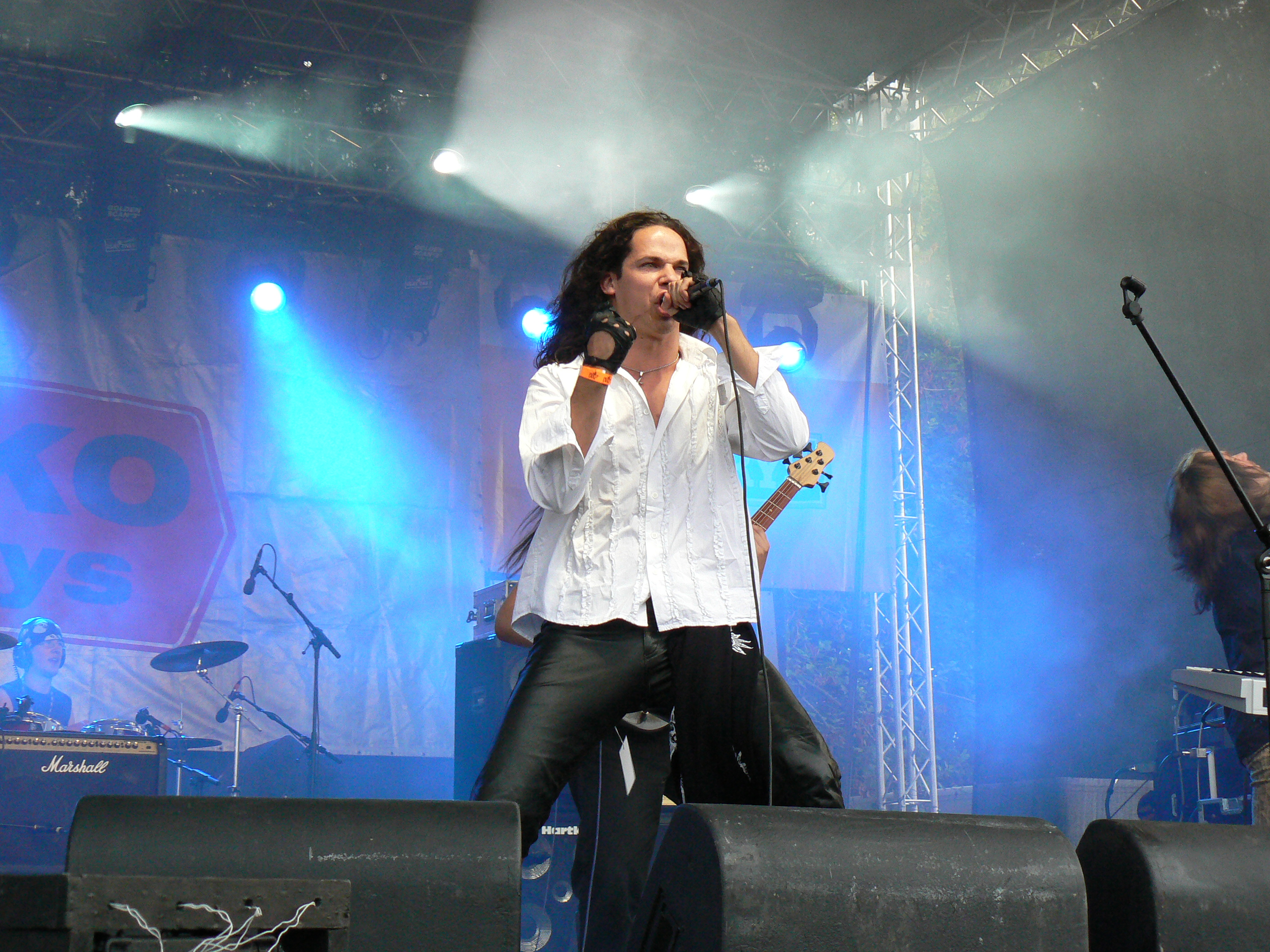
- Jeronimas in concert

Background information
- Born: Jeronimas Milius; 11 October 1984 (age 41); Vilnius, Lithuania
- Genres: Heavy metal, Power metal
- Occupations: Singer, songwriter
- Instrument: Vocals
- Years active: 2003–present

Jeronimas Milius (born 11 October 1984 in Vilnius, Lithuania) is a Lithuanian singer. Since 2003, he has been the leader of the heavy/power metal band Soul Stealer (formerly Soul Brothers).

== Career ==
Milius was elected to represent his country in the Eurovision Song Contest 2008 on 2 February 2008, collecting 11674 votes, leaving Aistė Pilvelytė with Troy on Fire close behind, whose backing vocalist he was in the national final for Eurovision Song Contest 2006. With his opera-like rock ballad "Nomads in the Night", he didn't make it to the final, ending his performance in the semi-final.

He appeared on the UK talent show 'Superstar', a search by Andrew Lloyd Webber to find the next 'Jesus' in his new arena production of Jesus Christ Superstar.

== See also ==
- Lithuania in the Eurovision Song Contest 2008

Awards and achievements
Preceded by 4Fun with "Love or Leave"	Lithuania in the Eurovision Song Contest; 2008	Succeeded by Sasha Son with "Love"
