= 4Fun =

Lithuanian music band

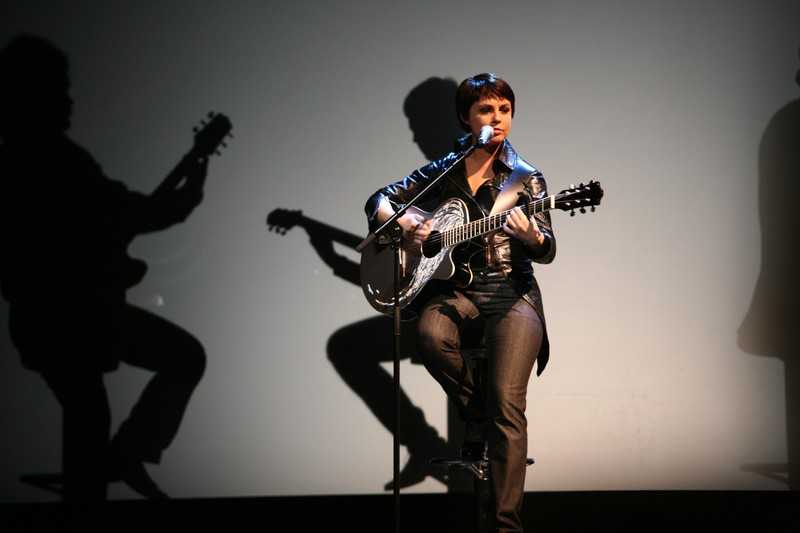
- 4Fun performing the song Love or Leave in 2007 Eurovision

Background information
- Genres: rock, pop rock, country
- Years active: 2001–present
- Members: Julija Ritčik (leader, vocals, acoustic guitar); Justas Jasenka (vocals, electric guitar); Rimantas Jasenka (bass guitar); Laimonas Staniulionis (percussion)
- Past members: Tomas Valeika (bass guitar 2001–2006); Alexandr Litz (lead guitar 2001–2002); Artur Zaikovski (lead guitar 2002–2003); Andžej Zujevič (lead guitar 2003–2008)
- Website: http://www.4fun.lt/

4Fun (sometimes also Julia & 4Fun) is a Lithuanian music band. They play a wide range of music styles, including rock, pop rock, and country. The band was created in 2001 and participated in several national and international festivals, including Visaginas Country and the Eurovision Song Contest.

== Biography ==
4Fun had participated in the national selection for the Eurovision three times. After unsuccessful attempts in 2005 and 2006, 4Fun won the national selection with their lyrical ballad Love or Leave and performance involving shadow play in 2007. They outstripped two other superfinalists: Aistė Pilvelytė and Rūta Ščiogolevaitė. 4Fun represented Lithuania in the Eurovision Song Contest 2007 in Helsinki and finished 21st with 28 points, with major votes from Ireland (12 points) and Latvia (10 points). Lead singer Julija Ritčik received a wild card entry directly to the finals of the national selection for Eurovision 2008, but placed only 12th out of 14 contestants.

In 2008, 4Fun together with Latvian Valters & Kaža recorded song With U, which became a hit in Latvia.

== Discography ==
- Gyvas (Alive) – 2004
- Dėlionė/A Puzzle – 2009 (a double CD: one in Lithuanian, another in English)

Awards and achievements
Preceded by LT United with "We Are the Winners"	Lithuania in the Eurovision Song Contest; 2007	Succeeded by Jeronimas Milius with "Nomads in the Night"
