= Rūta Ščiogolevaitė =

Lithuanian singer (born 1981)

- Also known as: Rūta
- Born: Rūta Ščiogolevaitė; 25 June 1981 (age 45); Šiauliai, Lithuania
- Genres: Pop, Jazz, R&B, Pop-Rock, Adult Contemporary
- Occupation: Singer
- Years active: 1996–present

Rūta Ščiogolevaitė (born 25 June 1981) is a Lithuanian singer. She decided late in her career that she wanted to be known as just Rūta.

== Life and career ==
=== Early life ===
Ščiogolevaitė was born on 25 June 1981 and raised in Šiauliai, Lithuania. She attended a local music school in her birth city, Šiauliai. Afterwards, she developed her interest in music, including piano classes, at the age of 14 in one of the most professional conservatoires of the country in the capital of Lithuania, Vilnius. After graduation in 2001, Ščiogolevaitė was still engaging on music despite her regular studies in university.

=== Music career ===
On repeated occasions, she appeared in various prestigious concerts and TV shows as well as projects of joint musicians. In 1998, was released her first solo album called "Rūta. Kelionė tolyn" ("Ruta. Journey away"). Simultaneously, Ščiogolevaitė recorded a few other songs which are still broadcast on most of the radio stations in Lithuania as well as the ones from the solo album. She was singing the restaurant in the capital of Tanzania, Dar es Salaam, along with the elite musicians. Moreover, she belonged to a music group "Funkadelix" as the lead singer and joint author of songs. In addition to this, in the years of 2002–2004 she was also a member of the music collective "Studija" ("Studio") which succeeded in the awards of "The Broadway" as the best pop group in 2003.

As being a master of the subject, in 2003 Ščiogolevaitė was awarded with the special prize of sympathy by the duma of Jūrmala in the internationally prestigious contest New Wave in Jūrmala. Furthermore, in the same time she started singing in "The Theatre of Broadway" with a programme of vaudeville which brought her a nomination for the best vocal. Also, the talented singer took a 2nd in the Lithuanian National Eurovision Song Contest in 2004 and 2007 and 3rd in 2011. Over and above, she was sent as a representative of Lithuania in the contest of the Europe and the region of the Mediterranean called "Eurodance 2007" with her famous song "Paskutinis šokis" ("Last Dance").

Although Ščiogolevaitė is renowned for such achievements as the title of "Ryškiausia žvaigždė ("The Brightest Star") in Lithuania in 2007 as well as the acknowledgment of the best radio song in the same year, 2nd places in "LATGA-A Song Contest", in one of the most popular Lithuanian music shows "Žvaigždžių duetai" ("Duets of Stars") on the major TV channel LNK in 2009 and in the contest of "Nauja daina 2010" ("New Song 2010") in 2011, she is also recognized abroad. In the end of the 2010 and the beginning of 2011 she was invited to perform in the Basilica of Rome where she was highly praised by numbers of Italian composers and such famous people as the legend of the big screen Enzo Peri. Subsequently, she won the 2nd place from the 1500 contestants in the annual international song festival "Slavianskij Bazar" in Vitebsk, Belarus in 2011.

== Lithuania in the Eurovision Song Contest ==
Year	National Final	Song	Results	
Year	National Final	Song	Lithuanian National Final	Eurovision Song Contest
1999	National Final	"Vasaros buvo per daug"	-	-
2004	National Final	"Over"	No. 2	-
2007	National Final	"If I Ever Make You Cry"	No. 2	-
2009	"Dainų daina"	"Redemption"	No. 4	-
2011	National Final	"Break Free"	No. 3	-
2016	National Final	"United"	No. 3	–

== Discography ==
- 1998 – "Rūta. Kelionė tolyn" ("Rūta. Travel along")
- 2005 – "Mano dainos" ("My songs")
- 2007 – "Paskutinis šokis" ("Last dance")
- 2012 – "Tai – gyvenimas. Just life"
