= Amberlife =

Lithuanian musician and songwriter

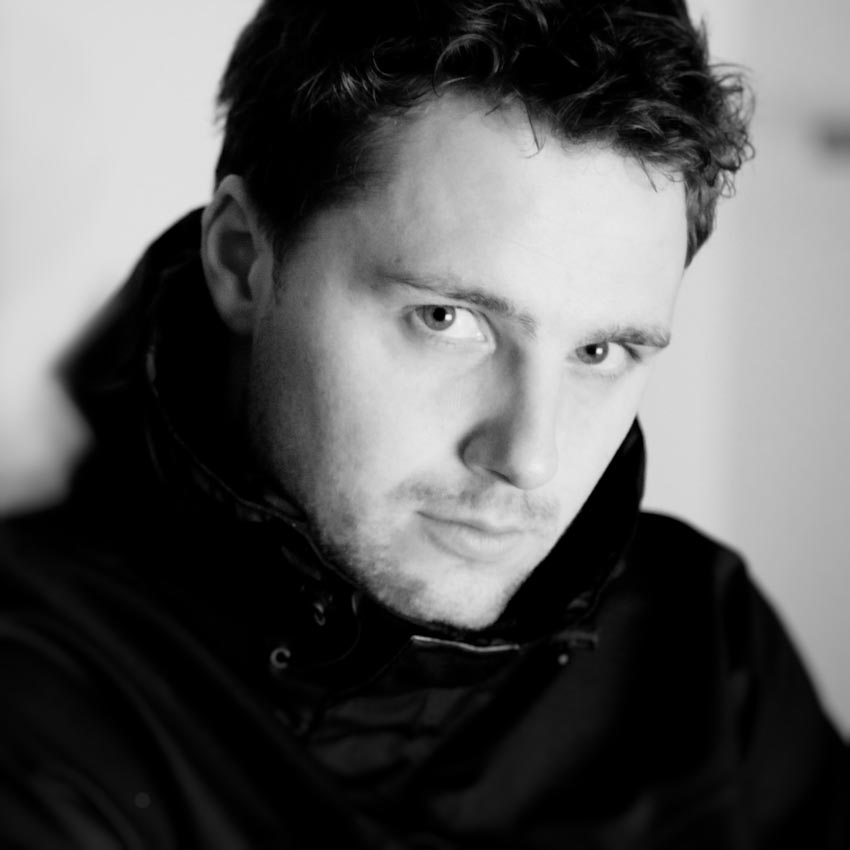
Amberlife in 2009

Amberlife (born Edgaras Lubys on 17 August 1983 in Klaipėda) is a popular Lithuanian musician and songwriter.

He collaborated with the well-known Lithuanian production company Cactus which led to an international career. He released three albums and was known in Latvia, Russia and Scandinavia.

A limited edition CD (3,000 copies), In Your Eyes, was released in January 2004 with all of the songs from Amberlife's first album plus four versions of "In Your Eyes". A video for "In Your Eyes" was filmed in Stockholm where he was photographed by Bingo Rimer, who has worked with Steven Tyler from Aerosmith, Backstreet Boys and others. Amberlife participated in the 2004 national selection for the Eurovision song contest. "In Your Eyes" was placed fourth in the final.

In 2005, he won the Song of the Year award from Radiocentras Awards for "My Lover's Gone" with the Latvian singer Ladybird.

Amberlife's song "Material World" was 12th in the 2010 national selection for Eurovision. He also competed in the 2015 national selection and finished fourth. When he competed in the 2017 national selection, he did not proceed from heat 7 to the semi-final.

== Studio albums ==
- In Your Eyes (2004)
- My Lover's Gone (2005)
- The Music Won't Stop (2007)
- Live at home (2010)
- Missing.lt (2011)
