= Lithuania in the Eurovision Song Contest 2007 =

- Eurovision Song Contest 2007
- Participating broadcaster: Lietuvos radijas ir televizija (LRT)
- Country: Lithuania
- Selection process: "Eurovizijos" dainų konkurso nacionalinė atranka
- Selection date: 3 March 2007

Competing entry
- Song: "Love or Leave"
- Artist: 4Fun
- Songwriters: Julija Ritčik

Placement
- Final result: 21st, 28 points

Participation chronology

Lithuania was represented at the Eurovision Song Contest 2007 with the song "Love or Leave", written by Julija Ritčik, and performed by the band 4Fun. The Lithuanian participating broadcaster, Lietuvos radijas ir televizija (LRT), organised the national final "Eurovizijos" dainų konkurso nacionalinė atranka in order to select its entry for the contest. The national final took place over six weeks and involved three different competitive streams: entries performed by newcomers, semi-established artists, and established artists. In the final, eleven artists and songs remained, and the winner was selected over two rounds of public voting. In the first round, the top three were selected to qualify to the superfinal. In the superfinal, "Love or Leave" performed by 4Fun was selected as the winner with 23,888 votes.

As one of the ten highest placed finishers in 2006, Lithuania automatically qualified to compete in the final of the Eurovision Song Contest. Performing during the show in position 9, Lithuania placed twenty-first out of the 24 participating countries with 28 points.

== Background ==
Prior to the 2007 contest, Lietuvos radijas ir televizija (LRT) had participated in the Eurovision Song Contest representing Lithuania seven times since its first entry in 1994. Its best placing in the contest was sixth, achieved in 2006 with the song "We Are the Winners" performed by LT United. This was also the only time Lithuania has managed to qualify to the final following the introduction of semi-finals in 2004.

As part of its duties as participating broadcaster, LRT organises the selection of its entry in the Eurovision Song Contest and broadcasts the event in the country. Other than the internal selection of its debut entry in 1994, the broadcaster has selected its entry consistently through a national final procedure. LRT confirmed its intentions to participate at the 2007 contest on 23 October 2006 and announced the organization of "Eurovizijos" dainų konkurso nacionalinė atranka, which would be the national final to select its entry for the contest.

== Before Eurovision ==
=== "Eurovizijos" dainų konkurso nacionalinė atranka ===
"Eurovizijos" dainų konkurso nacionalinė atranka (Eurovision Song Contest national selection) was the national final format developed by LRT in order to select its entry for the Eurovision Song Contest 2007. The competition involved a six-week-long process that commenced on 27 January 2007 and concluded with a winning song and artist on 3 March 2007. The six shows took place at the LRT studios in Vilnius and were hosted by Rolandas Vilkončius and Gabrielė Bartkutė. The shows were broadcast on LTV and LTV2 as well as online via the broadcaster's website lrt.lt.

==== Format ====
For the 2007 competition, entries competed in three different subgroups with different numbers participating in each group: newcomers (12), semi-established artists (13), and established artists (10). A separate heat was held for each group, resulting in four entries from newcomers, seven entries from semi-established artists, and eight entries from established artists advancing in the competition. LRT was to select a wildcard act out of the remaining non-qualifying acts from the heats, however, four wildcards were ultimately awarded due to problems with the presentation of the voting results in the first two heats. The fourth and fifth shows were the competition's semi-finals, where the remaining twenty-three entries participated and the top five from each semi-final proceeded to the final. LRT also selected a wildcard act for the final out of the remaining non-qualifying acts from the semi-finals. In the final, the winner was selected from the remaining eleven entries over two rounds of voting: the first round results selected the top three entries, while the second round determined the winner.

The results of the heats and the semi-finals were determined by the combination of votes from a three-member jury panel and public televoting. Each jury member had an equal stake in the final result and the public televote had a weighting equal to the votes of four jury members. Ties were decided in favour of the entry that received the most votes from the public. In the final, the results were determined solely by public televoting. The public could vote through telephone and SMS voting.

==== Competing entries ====
LRT opened a submission period on 23 October 2006 for artists and songwriters to submit their entries with the deadline on 15 December 2006. A live audition featuring the 65 submissions received took place on 5 and 6 January 2007 in front of a jury panel that consisted of LT United (music group), Zita Kelmickaitė (musicologist), Jonas Vilimas (LTV music producer) and Vilma Kuzmienė (psychologist). On 17 January 2007, LRT announced the 37 artists selected for the competition. The final changes to the list of 37 competing acts were later made with the withdrawal of singers Artas and Vilija Matačiūnaitė. LRT broadcast two introductory shows on 13 and 20 January 2007 that covered the live auditions and introduced the competing artists.

==== Jury members ====
Jury members by show
| Jury member | Heats | | | Semi-finals | | Final | Occupation(s) |
| Jury member | 1 | 2 | 3 | 1 | 2 | Final | Occupation(s) |
|---|---|---|---|---|---|---|---|
| Aidas Puklevičius | No | No | No | Yes | No | —N/a | screenwriter |
| Andrius Mamontovas | Yes | Yes | Yes | Yes | No | —N/a | musician |
| Arnoldas Lukošius | No | No | No | Yes | Yes | —N/a | keyboardist |
| Darius Užkuraitis | No | No | Yes | No | No | —N/a | musicologist, Opus 3 director |
| Donalda Meiželytė | Yes | No | No | No | No | —N/a | presenter |
| Edita Mildažytė | No | No | No | No | Yes | —N/a | journalist |
| Ilona Balsytė | No | No | Yes | No | No | —N/a | actress |
| Linas Adomaitis | Yes | No | No | No | No | —N/a | musician |
| Rūta Vanagaitė | No | Yes | No | No | No | —N/a | journalist |
| Vytenis Pauliukaitis | No | Yes | No | No | No | —N/a | director |
| Žeraldas Povilaitis | No | No | No | No | Yes | —N/a | composer, producer |

==== Shows ====
===== Heats =====
The three heats of the competition aired on 27 January, 3 February, and 10 February 2007. The first heat featured the newcomers, while the second heat featured the semi-established artists, and the third heat featured the established artists. In the first heat, the top four entries advanced to the semi-finals, while the top seven entries in the second heat advanced, and the top eight entries in the third heat advanced. Due to technical issues with the voting presentation in the first two heats, four of the entries originally announced to have been eliminated received a wildcard and also proceeded to the semi-finals.

Qualifier Wildcard qualifier

Heat 1 – 27 January 2007
| R/O | Artist | Song | Jury | Televote | | Total | Place |
| R/O | Artist | Song | Jury | Votes | Points | Total | Place |
|---|---|---|---|---|---|---|---|
| 1 | Pokeris | "Man reikia meilės" | 21 | 262 | 8 | 29 | 7 |
| 2 | Kupido | "Hero of Today" | 2 | 429 | 28 | 30 | 6 |
| 3 | Mini-Me | "Like You" | 27 | 448 | 32 | 59 | 3 |
| 4 | Marta | "Stay Away" | 22 | 173 | 4 | 26 | 9 |
| 5 | Alien Run Amuck | "A Cool Guy With Long Hair" | 16 | 290 | 16 | 32 | 5 |
| 6 | Dykaja Zemlia | "It's Time to Say Goodbye" | 2 | 400 | 24 | 26 | 8 |
| 7 | Slapjack | "Lust and Sexy Shadows" | 30 | 761 | 40 | 70 | 1 |
| 8 | Edgaras Kapočius | "I Will Survive Without You" | 5 | 264 | 12 | 17 | 10 |
| 9 | Jolita | "Air" | 6 | 67 | 0 | 6 | 12 |
| 10 | Barbė-Q | "Feel Your Lips" | 12 | 393 | 20 | 32 | 4 |
| 11 | Sweetness Theory | "Save Me" | 21 | 1,164 | 48 | 69 | 2 |
| 12 | Angelina | "Tavo pirktos gėlės" | 10 | 168 | 0 | 10 | 11 |

Detailed Jury Votes
| R/O | Song | D. Meiželytė | L. Adomaitis | A. Mamontovas | Total |
|---|---|---|---|---|---|
| 1 | "Man reikia meilės" | 10 | 1 | 10 | 21 |
| 2 | "Hero of Today" | 1 | | 1 | 2 |
| 3 | "Like You" | 8 | 7 | 12 | 27 |
| 4 | "Stay Away" | 7 | 10 | 5 | 22 |
| 5 | "A Cool Guy With Long Hair" | 3 | 5 | 8 | 16 |
| 6 | "It's Time to Say Goodbye" | | 2 | | 2 |
| 7 | "Lust and Sexy Shadows" | 12 | 12 | 6 | 30 |
| 8 | "I Will Survive Without You" | 2 | 3 | | 5 |
| 9 | "Air" | 4 | | 2 | 6 |
| 10 | "Feel Your Lips" | 5 | 4 | 3 | 12 |
| 11 | "Save Me" | 6 | 8 | 7 | 21 |
| 12 | "Tavo pirktos gėlės" | | 6 | 4 | 10 |

Heat 2 – 3 February 2007
| R/O | Artist | Song | Jury | Televote | | Total | Place |
| R/O | Artist | Song | Jury | Votes | Points | Total | Place |
|---|---|---|---|---|---|---|---|
| 1 | Edita | "Wherever I Go" | 18 | 72 | 0 | 18 | 10 |
| 2 | Ashtrey | "The Green Sun" | 24 | 377 | 24 | 48 | 3 |
| 3 | Ingrida Paukštytė | "Let's Pray" | 0 | 227 | 12 | 12 | 11 |
| 4 | Mėsa | "Bad Salad Ballad" | 16 | 450 | 32 | 48 | 3 |
| 5 | Žydrė | "It Was Good to Be With You" | 12 | 363 | 20 | 32 | 7 |
| 6 | Nerri | "Breaking Free" | 22 | 242 | 16 | 38 | 6 |
| 7 | Natas | "The Fall" | 23 | 207 | 8 | 31 | 8 |
| 8 | Stringaj | "Just Leave" | 12 | 422 | 28 | 40 | 5 |
| 9 | Igors | "There's No Matter" | 1 | 129 | 0 | 1 | 13 |
| 10 | Super Kolegos | "PiaR" | 5 | 199 | 4 | 9 | 12 |
| 11 | U-Soul | "At Your Door" | 13 | 454 | 40 | 53 | 2 |
| 12 | Helada | "Būk arti" | 21 | 162 | 0 | 21 | 9 |
| 13 | Edita and Erika | "Something About Love" | 7 | 564 | 48 | 55 | 1 |

Detailed Jury Votes
| R/O | Song | R. Vanagaitė | V. Pauliukaitis | A. Mamontovas | Total |
|---|---|---|---|---|---|
| 1 | "Wherever I Go" | 6 | 2 | 10 | 18 |
| 2 | "The Green Sun" | 4 | 8 | 12 | 24 |
| 3 | "Let's Pray" | | | | 0 |
| 4 | "Bad Salad Ballad" | 10 | 1 | 5 | 16 |
| 5 | "It Was Good to Be With You" | | 10 | 2 | 12 |
| 6 | "Breaking Free" | 12 | 6 | 4 | 22 |
| 7 | "The Fall" | 3 | 12 | 8 | 23 |
| 8 | "Just Leave" | | 5 | 7 | 12 |
| 9 | "There's No Matter" | 1 | | | 1 |
| 10 | "PiaR" | 5 | | | 5 |
| 11 | "At Your Door" | 7 | 3 | 3 | 13 |
| 12 | "Būk arti" | 8 | 7 | 6 | 21 |
| 13 | "Something About Love" | 2 | 4 | 1 | 7 |

Heat 3 – 10 February 2007
| R/O | Artist | Song | Jury | Televote | | Total | Place |
| R/O | Artist | Song | Jury | Votes | Points | Total | Place |
|---|---|---|---|---|---|---|---|
| 1 | Rūta Ščiogolevaitė | "If I Ever Make You Cry" | 24 | 909 | 32 | 56 | 3 |
| 2 | Aistė Pilvelytė | "Emotional Crisis" | 13 | 403 | 20 | 33 | 6 |
| 3 | Rasa Kaušiutė | "Stranger" | 4 | 184 | 8 | 12 | 10 |
| 4 | Nacija | "Fly Up Together" | 12 | 81 | 4 | 16 | 9 |
| 5 | Dove and Gerda | "Each Day of My Life" | 20 | 265 | 16 | 36 | 5 |
| 6 | Augustė | "Fate" | 26 | 938 | 40 | 66 | 2 |
| 7 | 4Fun | "Love or Leave" | 36 | 3,351 | 48 | 84 | 1 |
| 8 | The Road Band | "Auksinis ruduo" | 10 | 205 | 12 | 22 | 8 |
| 9 | Saulės kliošas | "Tell Me Why" | 23 | 689 | 28 | 51 | 4 |
| 10 | Onsa | "Stay Here" | 6 | 420 | 24 | 30 | 7 |

Detailed Jury Votes
| R/O | Song | I. Balsytė | D. Užkuraitis | A. Mamontovas | Total |
|---|---|---|---|---|---|
| 1 | "If I Ever Make You Cry" | 8 | 8 | 8 | 24 |
| 2 | "Emotional Crisis" | 5 | 4 | 4 | 13 |
| 3 | "Stranger" | 1 | 2 | 1 | 4 |
| 4 | "Fly Up Together" | 4 | 3 | 5 | 12 |
| 5 | "Each Day of My Life" | 7 | 6 | 7 | 20 |
| 6 | "Fate" | 10 | 10 | 6 | 26 |
| 7 | "Love or Leave" | 12 | 12 | 12 | 36 |
| 8 | "Auksinis ruduo" | 3 | 5 | 2 | 10 |
| 9 | "Tell Me Why" | 6 | 7 | 10 | 23 |
| 10 | "Stay Here" | 2 | 1 | 3 | 6 |

===== Semi-finals =====
The two semi-finals of the competition aired on 17 and 24 February 2007 and featured all remaining entries in the competition. The top five entries advanced to the final from each semi-final, while the bottom entries were eliminated. On 25 February 2007, LRT announced that "The Fall" performed by Natas had received the wildcard and also proceeded to the final.

Qualifier Wildcard qualifier

Semi-final 1 – 17 February 2007
| R/O | Artist | Song | Jury | Televote | | Total | Place |
| R/O | Artist | Song | Jury | Votes | Points | Total | Place |
|---|---|---|---|---|---|---|---|
| 1 | 4Fun | "Love or Leave" | 32 | 1,954 | 48 | 80 | 1 |
| 2 | Edita and Erika | "Something About Love" | 0 | 326 | 4 | 4 | 12 |
| 3 | U-Soul | "At Your Door" | 6 | 458 | 20 | 26 | 7 |
| 4 | Barbė-Q | "Feel Your Lips" | 6 | 340 | 0 | 6 | 10 |
| 5 | Aistė Pilvelytė | "Emotional Crisis" | 16 | 1,289 | 40 | 56 | 2 |
| 6 | Slapjack | "Lust and Sexy Shadows" | 23 | 531 | 24 | 47 | 4 |
| 7 | Onsa | "Stay Here" | 10 | 328 | 8 | 18 | 9 |
| 8 | Sweetness Theory | "Save Me" | 15 | 762 | 32 | 47 | 4 |
| 9 | Stringaj | "Just Leave" | 7 | 366 | 12 | 19 | 8 |
| 10 | Natas | "The Fall" | 30 | 374 | 16 | 46 | 6 |
| 11 | Ashtrey | "The Green Sun" | 24 | 659 | 28 | 52 | 3 |
| 12 | The Road Band | "Auksinis ruduo" | 5 | 277 | 0 | 5 | 11 |

Detailed Jury Votes
| R/O | Song | A. Lukošius | A. Puklevičius | A. Mamontovas | Total |
|---|---|---|---|---|---|
| 1 | "Love or Leave" | 12 | 12 | 8 | 32 |
| 2 | "Something About Love" | | | | 0 |
| 3 | "At Your Door" | 2 | 2 | 2 | 6 |
| 4 | "Feel Your Lips" | 5 | 1 | | 6 |
| 5 | "Emotional Crisis" | 7 | 6 | 3 | 16 |
| 6 | "Lust and Sexy Shadows" | 10 | 7 | 6 | 23 |
| 7 | "Stay Here" | 1 | 4 | 5 | 10 |
| 8 | "Save Me" | 3 | 5 | 7 | 15 |
| 9 | "Just Leave" | | 3 | 4 | 7 |
| 10 | "The Fall" | 8 | 10 | 12 | 30 |
| 11 | "The Green Sun" | 6 | 8 | 10 | 24 |
| 12 | "Auksinis ruduo" | 4 | | 1 | 5 |

Semi-final 2 – 24 February 2007
| R/O | Artist | Song | Jury | Televote | | Total | Place |
| R/O | Artist | Song | Jury | Votes | Points | Total | Place |
|---|---|---|---|---|---|---|---|
| 1 | Rūta Ščiogolevaitė | "If I Ever Make You Cry" | 34 | 1,399 | 48 | 82 | 1 |
| 2 | Augustė | "Fate" | 24 | 593 | 20 | 44 | 5 |
| 3 | Mini-Me | "Like You" | 16 | 991 | 32 | 48 | 3 |
| 4 | Alien Run Amuck | "A Cool Guy With Long Hair" | 16 | 299 | 8 | 24 | 7 |
| 5 | Edita | "Wherever I Go" | 6 | 71 | 0 | 6 | 10 |
| 6 | Žydrė | "It Was Good to Be With You" | 6 | 358 | 16 | 22 | 8 |
| 7 | Ingrida Paukštytė | "Let's Pray" | 2 | 211 | 4 | 6 | 10 |
| 8 | Dove and Gerda | "Each Day of My Life" | 21 | 617 | 24 | 45 | 4 |
| 9 | Mėsa | "Bad Salad Ballad" | 10 | 935 | 28 | 38 | 6 |
| 10 | Saulės kliošas | "Tell Me Why" | 32 | 1,134 | 40 | 72 | 2 |
| 11 | Nerri | "Breaking Free" | 7 | 350 | 12 | 19 | 9 |

Detailed Jury Votes
| R/O | Song | A. Lukošius | E. Mildažytė | Ž. Povilaitis | Total |
|---|---|---|---|---|---|
| 1 | "If I Ever Make You Cry" | 10 | 12 | 12 | 34 |
| 2 | "Fate" | 8 | 8 | 8 | 24 |
| 3 | "Like You" | 6 | 5 | 5 | 16 |
| 4 | "A Cool Guy With Long Hair" | 4 | 6 | 6 | 16 |
| 5 | "Wherever I Go" | | 2 | 4 | 6 |
| 6 | "It Was Good to Be With You" | 3 | 1 | 2 | 6 |
| 7 | "Let's Pray" | 2 | | | 2 |
| 8 | "Each Day of My Life" | 7 | 7 | 7 | 21 |
| 9 | "Bad Salad Ballad" | 5 | 4 | 1 | 10 |
| 10 | "Tell Me Why" | 12 | 10 | 10 | 32 |
| 11 | "Breaking Free" | 1 | 3 | 3 | 7 |

===== Final =====
The final of the competition took place on 3 March 2007 and featured the remaining eleven entries that qualified from the two semi-finals. The final was the only show in the competition to be broadcast live; all other preceding shows were pre-recorded earlier in the week before their airdates. The winner was selected over two rounds of public televoting. In the first round, the top three entries advanced to the superfinal. In the superfinal, "Love or Leave" performed by 4Fun was selected as the winner. In addition to the performances of the competing entries, interval acts included several entries that would participate in the Eurovision Song Contest 2007: Dmitry Koldun performing "Work Your Magic" (Belarus), Bonaparti.lv performing "Questa notte" (Latvia), Olivia Lewis performing "Vertigo" (Malta), Guri Schanke performing "Ven a bailar conmigo" (Norway), and The Jet Set performing "Time to Party" (Poland).

Final – 3 March 2007
| R/O | Artist | Song | Televote | Place |
|---|---|---|---|---|
| 1 | Saulės kliošas | "Tell Me Why" | 3,586 | 5 |
| 2 | 4Fun | "Love or Leave" | 6,833 | 3 |
| 3 | Sweetness Theory | "Save Me" | 1,428 | 10 |
| 4 | Aistė Pilvelytė | "Emotional Crisis" | 7,944 | 2 |
| 5 | Slapjack | "Lust and Sexy Shadows" | 1,559 | 8 |
| 6 | Dove and Gerda | "Each Day of My Life" | 508 | 11 |
| 7 | Rūta Ščiogolevaitė | "If I Ever Make You Cry" | 10,179 | 1 |
| 8 | Mini-Me | "Like You" | 1,166 | 7 |
| 9 | Natas | "The Fall" | 1,446 | 9 |
| 10 | Ashtrey | "The Green Sun" | 1,939 | 6 |
| 11 | Augustė | "Fate" | 4,488 | 4 |

Superfinal – 3 March 2007
| R/O | Artist | Song | Televote | Place |
|---|---|---|---|---|
| 1 | 4Fun | "Love or Leave" | 23,888 | 1 |
| 2 | Aistė Pilvelytė | "Emotional Crisis" | 10,155 | 3 |
| 3 | Rūta Ščiogolevaitė | "If I Ever Make You Cry" | 20,133 | 2 |

=== Promotion ===
4Fun made several appearances across Europe to specifically promote "Love or Leave" as the Lithuanian Eurovision entry. Between 19 and 20 April, 4Fun took part in promotional activities in Minsk, Belarus, where they made television and radio appearances, gave interviews to the press, and took part in a press conference organised by the Belarusian Television and Radio Company (BTRC). On 21 April, 4Fun performed at a concert for the Lithuanian community in Puńsk, Poland. The band also took part in promotional activities in Estonia, Latvia, and Ukraine with their promotional tour being supported by the Government of Lithuania, which approved a budget of 100,000 litas for the occasion.

== At Eurovision ==
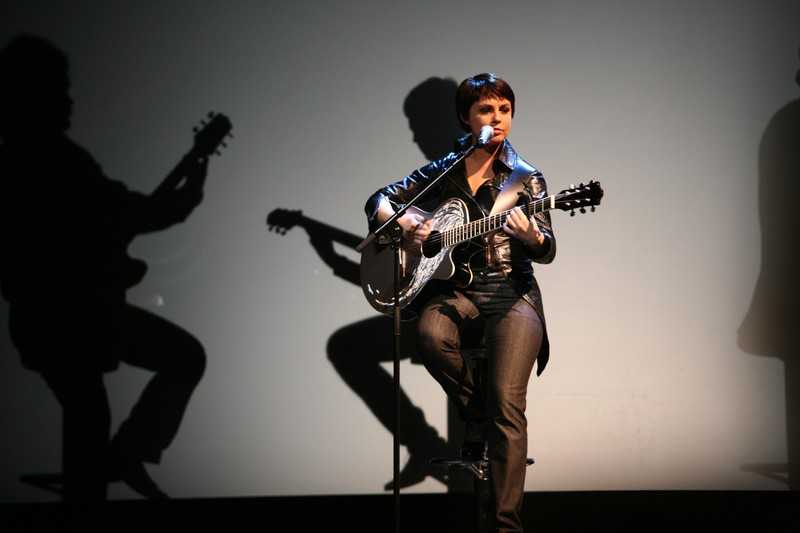
4Fun during a rehearsal before the final

According to Eurovision rules, all nations except the "Big Four" (France, Germany, Spain and the United Kingdom), the host country, and the ten highest placed finishers in the 2006 contest are required to qualify from the semi-final in order to compete for the final; the top ten countries from the semi-final progress to the final. As one of the ten highest placed finishers in the 2006 contest, Lithuania automatically qualified to compete in the final on 12 May 2007. In addition to their participation in the final, Lithuania is also required to broadcast and vote in the semi-final on 10 May 2007. On 12 March 2007, a special allocation draw was held which determined the running order and Lithuania was set to perform in position 9 during the final, following the entry from Hungary and before the entry from Greece.

4Fun took part in technical rehearsals on 7 and 8 May, followed by dress rehearsals on 11 and 12 May. The Lithuanian performance featured the members of 4Fun performing on stage in black and white outfits, with lead singer Julija Ritčik sitting on a stool at the stage centre with a guitar and the other members appearing as silhouettes behind a white screen with blue coloured shades. 4Fun's outfits were designed by Aleksandras Pogrebnojus and Vida Simanavičiūtė. Lithuania placed twenty-first in the final, scoring 28 points.

The semi-final and final were broadcast in Lithuania on LTV with commentary by Darius Užkuraitis. LRT appointed Lavija Šurnaitė as its spokesperson to announce the Lithuanian votes during the final.

=== Voting ===
Below is a breakdown of points awarded to Lithuania and awarded by Lithuania in the semi-final and grand final of the contest. The nation awarded its 12 points to Latvia in the semi-final and to Georgia in the final of the contest.

==== Points awarded to Lithuania ====
Points awarded to Lithuania (Final)
| Score | Country |
|---|---|
| 12 points | Ireland |
| 10 points | Latvia |
| 8 points | |
| 7 points | |
| 6 points | |
| 5 points | |
| 4 points | |
| 3 points | United Kingdom |
| 2 points | Belarus |
| 1 point | Andorra |

==== Points awarded by Lithuania ====
Points awarded by Lithuania (Semi-final)
| Score | Country |
|---|---|
| 12 points | Latvia |
| 10 points | Belarus |
| 8 points | Georgia |
| 7 points | Hungary |
| 6 points | Estonia |
| 5 points | Iceland |
| 4 points | Israel |
| 3 points | Poland |
| 2 points | Andorra |
| 1 point | Serbia |

Points awarded by Lithuania (Final)
| Score | Country |
|---|---|
| 12 points | Georgia |
| 10 points | Latvia |
| 8 points | Ukraine |
| 7 points | Belarus |
| 6 points | Russia |
| 5 points | Finland |
| 4 points | Hungary |
| 3 points | France |
| 2 points | Moldova |
| 1 point | Slovenia |
