= Evelina Sašenko =

Lithuanian singer

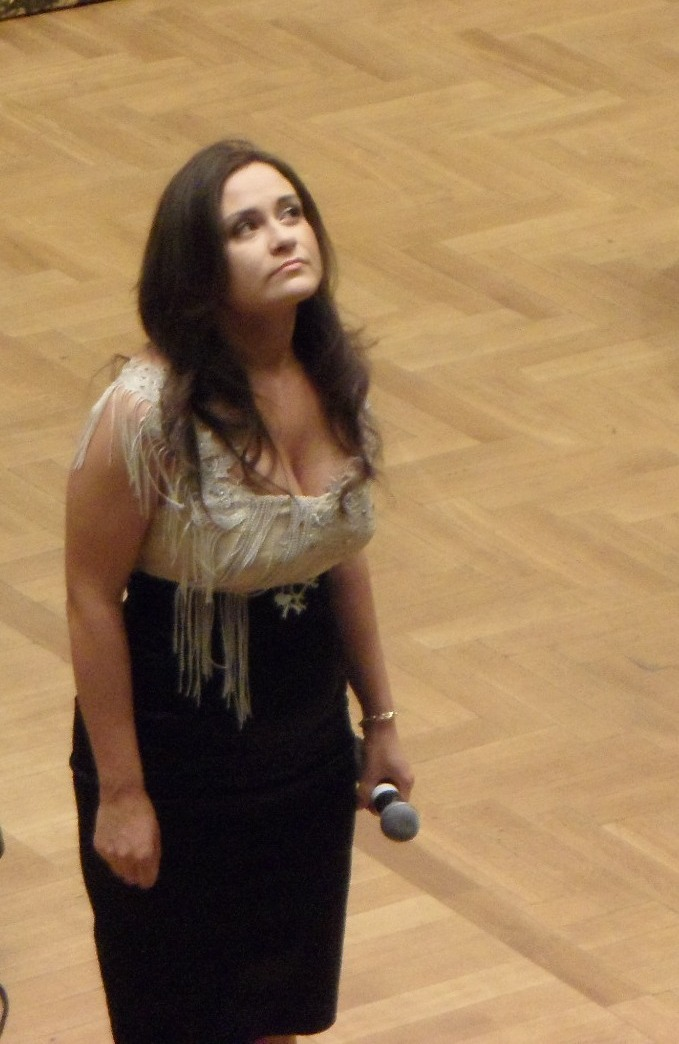
- Sašenko in 2011

Background information
- Also known as: Ewelina Saszenko
- Born: 26 July 1987 (age 39); Rūdiškės, Lithuania
- Genres: Jazz, classical crossover, adult contemporary, operatic pop
- Occupation: Singer
- Instrument: Vocals
- Years active: 1993–present

Evelina Sašenko-Statulevičienė (Polish: Ewelina Saszenko; Ukrainian: Евеліна Сашенко; born 26 July 1987) is a Lithuanian jazz singer of Polish-Ukrainian descent who was born and lives in Lithuania.

== Biography ==
Sašenko was born in Rūdiškės into a Polish-Ukrainian family from the Vilnius Region. She studied at the Lithuanian Academy of Music and Theatre. Sašenko started her music career as a child. She is a prize winner of Dainų dainelė, the national Lithuanian children music festival. In 2009, she participated in the LTV opera contest Triumfo arka, gaining fame and recognition. She is also known for participating in various television projects.

== Eurovision ==
In the 2010 Lithuanian Eurovision national final, Sašenko reached 3rd place. A year later, she won the national final. She represented Lithuania at the Eurovision Song Contest 2011 with the song "C'est ma vie". During her participation in the 2011 Eurovision, she wanted to participate under her Polish name, Ewelina Saszenko. She finished in 19th place in the final in Düsseldorf, Germany. She planned to participate in the 2021 Lithuanian Eurovision national final but later withdrew.

== Personal life ==
In 2018, Sašenko married Giedrius Statulevičius. She currently lives in Trakai, Lithuania.

Awards and achievements
Preceded by InCulto with "Eastern European Funk"	Lithuania in the Eurovision Song Contest; 2011	Succeeded by Donny Montell with "Love Is Blind"
