= Sasha Song =

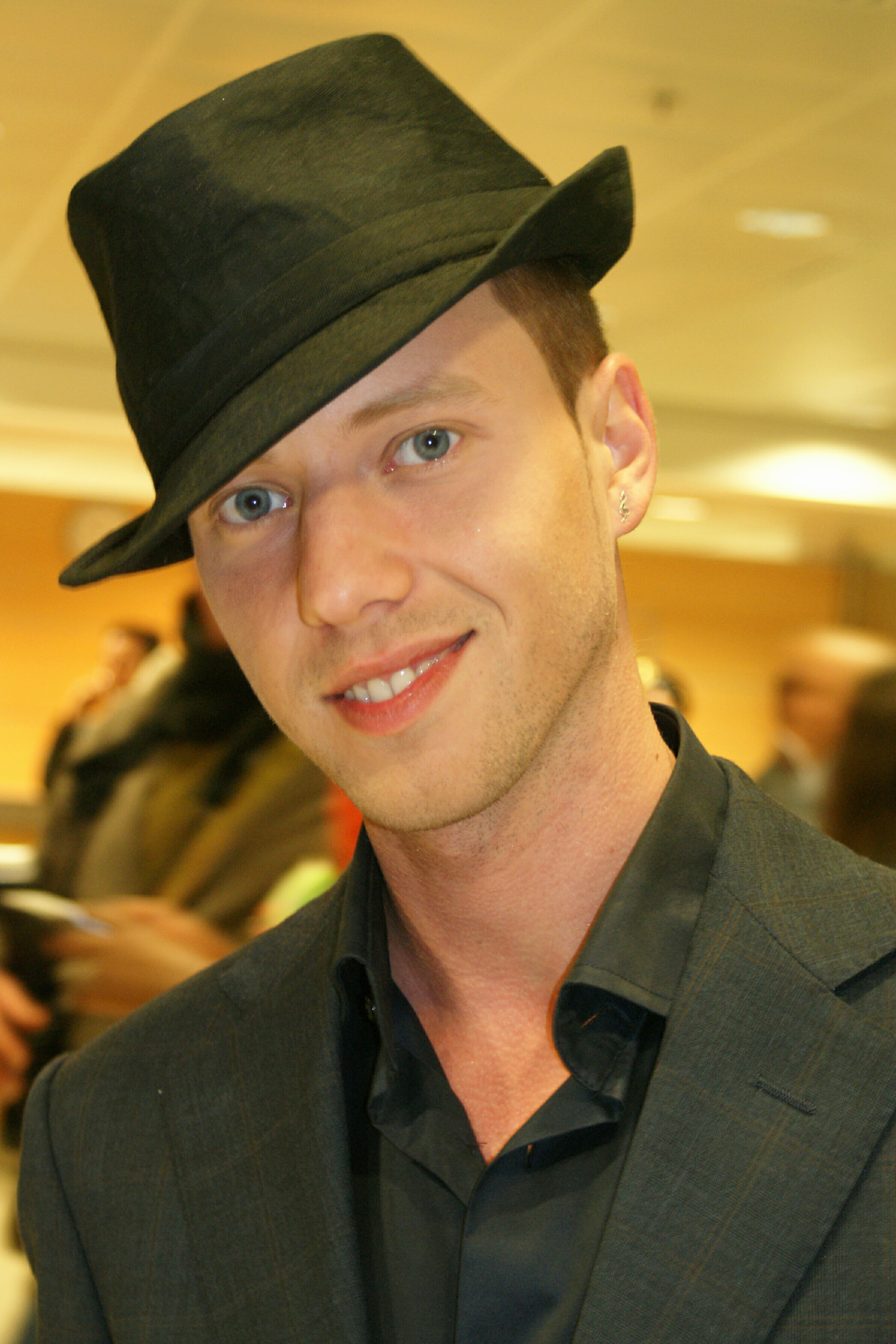
- Shavrov in Moscow in 2009.

Background information
- Also known as: Sasha Son; Dmitrijus Šavrovas; Dima Šavrovas
- Born: Dmitrij Šavrov; 18 September 1983 (age 42); Vilnius, Lithuania
- Genres: Pop,
- Occupations: Singer; songwriter
- Years active: 1993–present

Dmitry Shavrov (Russian: Дмитрий Шавров, Lithuanian: Dmitrijus Šavrovas; born 18 September 1983), better known by his stage names Sasha Song or Sasha Son, is a Lithuanian singer and songwriter. He represented Lithuania in the Eurovision Song Contest 2009. His stage name Sasha Son means "Sasha Dream" in Russian, with Sasha being a Russian diminutive form of the name Alexander.

== Biography ==
=== Early life ===
At 12 years old, Šavrovas debuted in the music scene of Lithuania. He is a Russian-Lithuanian. His biggest hit to date is Mama. He is currently the youngest person to have won the "Bravo" music award for the Song of the year with his song Mama. At the age of 15, he moved to the United Kingdom; he completed secondary education there, and acquired musical education.

=== Professional life ===
He represented Lithuania at the Eurovision Song Contest 2009 in the second Semi-Final and advanced to the Final, where he finished in 23rd place. Dmitry had previously worked with Eurovision Song Contest 2008 winner Dima Bilan. At the Eurovision pre-selection final, he received full points from all the juries. He participated again in Lithuania's national selection for Eurovision 2010, along with Nora, with the song "Say Yes to Life."

== See also ==
- Lithuania in the Eurovision Song Contest 2009

Awards and achievements
Preceded by Jeronimas Milius with "Nomads in the Night"	Lithuania in the Eurovision Song Contest; 2009	Succeeded by InCulto with "Eastern European Funk"
