= Aistė Pilvelytė =

Lithuanian singer (born 1979)

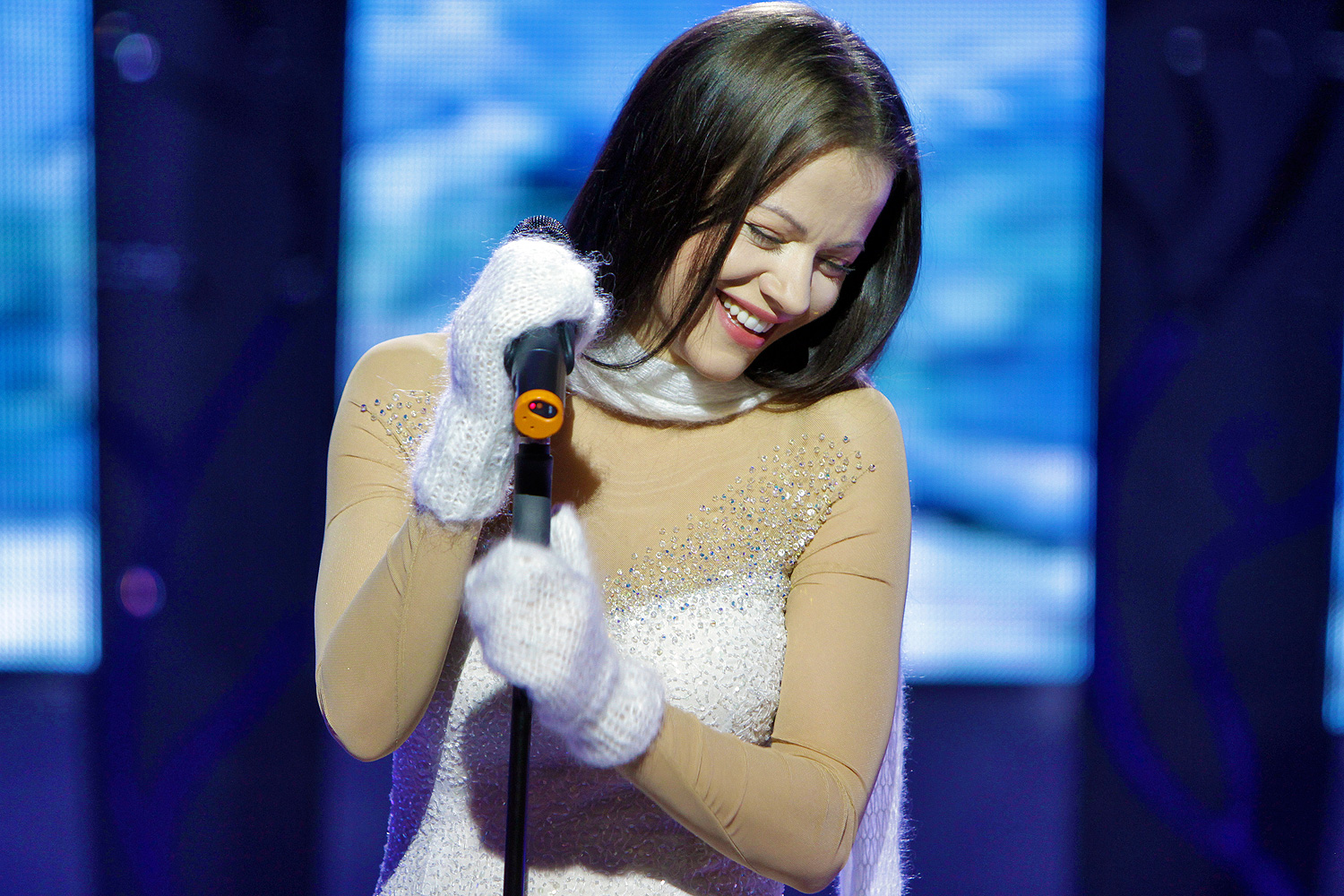

Background information
- Born: 27 July 1979 (age 47); Kaunas, Lithuania
- Genres: Pop
- Occupation: Singer
- Instrument: Vocals
- Years active: 1990 — present

Aistė Pilvelytė (born 27 July 1979) is a Lithuanian singer.

== Biography ==
Pilvelytė was born to Stasė Pilvelienė and Algirdas Pilvelis. In 1986, she learned choral conducting and pop music at the Balys Dvarionas Music School in the Lithuanian capital, Vilnius. By 1990, she appeared in various singing shows for children. She also sang in the groups Pagalvėlės and Exem. In 1995, she continued her singing lessons with Nijolė Maceikaitė. In the following years she took part in various music competitions in Ireland, Malta, Kazakhstan and Turkey.

In 2006, Pilvelytė won the television show Lietuvos dainų dešimtukas. In 2008, together with Romas Bubnelis, she won the show Žvaigždžių duetai 2. She continued to take part in the shows Duo kartos and Delfinai ir žvaigždės.

She has competed repeatedly in Lithuanian national selections for the Eurovision Song Contest. After twelve failed attempts, in an interview with Delfi, she stated: "No matter how old I will be, 50, 60, or 93 – I will go to Eurovision". Her first participation came in 1999, when she placed 11th in the final with the song "Nubudusi širdis". She was also set to compete in 2002, but was disqualified for admitted plagiarism. She then returned in 2004, placing 12th with the song "Amor (te quiero aqui)", also participating in 2005 and 2006. Her first superfinal qualification came in 2007, when she placed second in the first round of the final and third in the superfinal. After this, she would place second three times, i.e. in 2008 (with the song "Troy on Fire"), 2010 (with the song "Melancolia") and 2017 (with the song "I'm Like a Wolf"). She also took part in 2014, though that edition was held under a talent show format with covers, and was eliminated. She also participated in 2016 and 2020 placing fifth both times, and in 2023 where she didn't progress past the heats. In 2026, she placed sixth in the first semi-final of Eurovizija.LT with the song "Tarp žvaigždžių tylos".

== Personal life ==
Pilvelytė was married to Vladas Motieka from 2005 to 2012. From this marriage, she has a daughter.

At the end of December 2014, the Klaipėda District Court granted Pilvelytė's application to open bankruptcy proceedings. At the beginning of the same year, several of her properties were sold in order to reduce the debt burden that had arisen during the 2008 financial crisis. In June 2019, the Klaipėda District Court announced the conclusion of the case.

== Discography ==
- Aistė (2000)
- Meilė Dar Gyva (2007)
