= 2015 M.A.M.A. awards =

5th Music association's awards of the year
- Date: January 29, 2016
- Location: Žalgiris Arena, Kaunas, Lithuania
- Hosted by: Justinas Jankevičius & Jazzu

Highlights
- Most awards: Monika Linkytė (3) & Leon Somov & Jazzu (3)
- Most nominations: Leon Somov & Jazzu (4)

Television/radio coverage
- Network: TV3 Lithuania

The 5th Annual M.A.M.A. Awards was held on January 29, 2016, at Žalgiris Arena in Kaunas, Lithuania.

== Nominees and winners ==
Note: Winners are listed in bold.

=== Best Female Act ===
- Alina Orlova
- Girmantė
- Jurga Šeduikytė
- **Monika Linkytė**
- Monika Liu

=== Best Male Act ===
- Edgaras Lubys
- Jurgis Didžiulis
- Markas Palubenka
- Tomas Sinickis
- **Vaidas Baumila**

=== Breakthrough of the Year ===
- **Antikvariniai Kašpirovskio Dantys**
- Deeper Upper
- Garbanotas Bosistas
- Monika Liu
- Z On A

=== Best Pop Act ===
- Jurga Šeduikytė
- **Leon Somov & Jazzu**
- Monika Linkytė
- SEL
- Vaidas Baumila

=== Best Rock Act ===
- **BIX**
- Rebelheart
- Siela
- Tomas Sinickis
- Freaks On Floor

=== Best Alternative Act ===
- Aistė Smilgevičiūtė & SKYLĖ
- Alina Orlova
- ba.
- **Garbanotas Bosistas**
- Vidas Bareikis

=== Best Electronic Act ===
- **Beissoul & Einius**
- Deep Shoq
- GeraiGerai
- Jazzyvile
- Proper Heat

=== Best Hip Hop Act ===
- Dee & Kamy
- G&G Sindikatas
- **Lilas & Innomine**
- MC Mesijus & Münpauzn
- Omerta

=== Best Band ===
- Aistė Smilgevičiūtė & SKYLĖ
- BIX
- Garbanotas Bosistas
- **Leon Somov & Jazzu**
- SEL

=== Best Live Act ===
- Antis
- Džordana Butkutė
- Gytis Paškevičius
- **Marijonas Mikutavičius**
- SEL

=== Best Album ===
- Tomas Sinickis – Mylimas Vyras Ir Sūnus
- MC Mesijus & Münpauzn – #UZGROTU
- Garbanotas Bosistas – Above Us
- Leon Somov & Jazzu – Istorijos
- Freaks On Floor – Life
- Markas Palubenka – Puzzleman
- BIX – RAY
- G&G Sindikatas – Revoliucijos Garso Takelis
- Aistė Smilgevičiūtė & SKYLĖ – Vilko Vartai
- **Monika Linkytė – Walk With Me**

=== Best Song ===
- Lilas & Innomine – „Karina“
- **Monika Linkytė – „Po dangum“**
- Leon Somov & Jazzu – „Po mano oda“
- Monika Linkytė & Vaidas Baumila – „This Time“
- Marijonas Mikutavičius – „Tu čia, tu čia“

=== Best Music Video ===
- Markas Palubenka – „A Woman Of Stone“
- Vaidas Baumila – „Ant Mašinos Stogo“
- **Antikvariniai Kašpirovskio Dantys – „Į Venesuelą“**
- The Roop – „Not Too Late“
- Deeper Upper – „Unity“

=== AGATA Most-Played Act ===
- **Aistė Smilgevičiūtė & SKYLĖ**

=== LATGA Most Popular Composer ===
- **Leon Somov**

=== Award of Merit ===
- **Nerija**
