= Lithuania in the Eurovision Song Contest 2022 =

- Eurovision Song Contest 2022
- Country: Lithuania
- Selection process: Pabandom iš naujo! 2022
- Selection date: 12 February 2022

Competing entry
- Song: "Sentimentai"
- Artist: Monika Liu
- Songwriters: Monika Liubinaitė

Placement
- Semi-final result: Qualified (7th, 159 points)
- Final result: 14th, 128 points

Participation chronology

Lithuania was represented at the Eurovision Song Contest 2022 with the song "Sentimentai", written and performed by Monika Liubinaitė under her stage name Monika Liu. The Lithuanian broadcaster Lithuanian National Radio and Television (LRT) organised the national final Pabandom iš naujo! 2022 (Let's try again! 2022) in order to select the Lithuanian entry for the 2022 contest. The national final took place over six weeks and involved 34 competing entries. The results of each show were determined by the combination of votes from a jury panel and a public vote. In the final, eight artists and songs remained and "Sentimentai" performed by Monika Liu was selected as the winner.

Lithuania was drawn to compete in the first semi-final of the Eurovision Song Contest which took place on 10 May 2022. Performing during the show in position 3, "Sentimentai" was announced among the top 10 entries of the first semi-final and therefore qualified to compete in the final on 14 May. It was later revealed that Lithuania placed seventh out of the 17 participating countries in the semi-final with 159 points. In the final, Lithuania performed in position 14 and placed 14th out of the 25 participating countries, scoring 128 points.

== Background ==
Prior to the 2022 contest, Lithuania had participated in the Eurovision Song Contest 21 times since its first entry in 1994. The nation's best placing in the contest was sixth, which it achieved in 2006 with the song "We Are the Winners" performed by LT United. Following the introduction of semi-finals for the 2004, Lithuania, to this point, has managed to qualify to the final 10 times. In the 2021 contest, "Discoteque" performed by the Roop qualified to the final where the song scored 220 points and placed 8th.

For the 2022 contest, the Lithuanian national broadcaster, Lithuanian National Radio and Television (LRT), broadcast the event within Lithuania and organised the selection process for the nation's entry. Other than the internal selection of their debut entry in 1994, LRT has selected all of its entries through a national final procedure: "Eurovizijos" dainų konkurso nacionalinė atranka between 1999 and 2019, and Pabandom iš naujo! since 2020. LRT confirmed their intentions to participate at the 2022 Eurovision Song Contest on 16 August 2021. On 1 October 2021, the broadcaster announced the organization of Pabandom iš naujo!, which would be the national final to select its entry for Turin.

== Before Eurovision ==
=== Pabandom iš naujo! 2022 ===
Pabandom iš naujo! 2022 (Let's try again! 2022) was the national final format developed by LRT in order to select Lithuania's entry for the Eurovision Song Contest 2022. The competition involved a six-week-long process that commenced on 8 January 2022 and concluded with a winning song and artist on 12 February 2022. The six shows took place at the LRT studios in Vilnius and were hosted by Ieva Stasiulevičiūtė, Giedrius Masalskis and Richardas Jonaitis. The shows were broadcast on LRT televizija, LRT Lituanica and LRT Radijas as well as online via the broadcaster's website lrt.lt.

==== Format ====
The 2022 competition involved 34 entries and consisted of six shows. The first three shows were the heats consisting of 11 or 12 entries each. The top five entries advanced in the competition from each heat, while the remaining 18 entries participated in the fifth and sixth shows which were the competition's semi-finals where nine entries participated in each show and the top four proceeded to the final. In the final, the winner was selected from the remaining eight entries. The broadcaster allocated a budget of around €54,000 to be divided among the competing artists in order to support their preparations for the national final. A monetary prize of €5,000 was also awarded to the winning songwriters by the Lithuanian Copyright Protection Association (LATGA) in order to encourage further development of the song in an aim to achieve international success.

The results of each of the six shows were determined by the 50/50 combination of votes from a jury panel and public televoting. The ranking developed by both streams of voting was converted to points from 1–8, 10 and 12 and assigned based on the number of competing songs in the respective show. The public could vote through telephone and SMS voting. Ties in all shows were decided in favour of the entry that received the most points from the jury.

==== Competing entries ====
LRT opened a submission period on 1 October 2021 for artists and songwriters to submit their entries with the deadline on 25 November 2021. On 3 January 2020, LRT announced the 36 artists selected for the competition from more than 50 submissions received. Among the artists were previous Lithuanian Eurovision contestants Erica Jennings, who represented Lithuania in 2001 as part of Skamp, Vilija Matačiūnaitė, who represented the nation in 2014, Monika Linkytė, who represented the nation in 2015, and Ieva Zasimauskaitė, who represented the nation in 2018. The nine-member jury panel that selected the competing entries consisted of Gytis Oganauskas (LRT deputy director general), Audrius Giržadas (LRT televizija chief producer), Ramūnas Zilnys (LRT pop music editor-in-chief), Darius Užkuraitis (LRT Opus senior music editor), Lina Patskočimaitė (Head of LRT's digital assets department), Rūta Putnikienė (Head of LRT's communication and marketing department), Miglė Savickaitė (LRT public relations representative), Povilas Varvuolis (television director) and Vytautas Bikus (composer).

On 11 January 2022, the final changes to the list of 36 competing acts were made with the withdrawal of the songs "Out of Mind" performed by Alekas for personal reasons and "See You Again" performed by Monika Linkytė due to illness of the singer.

Artist	Song	Songwriter(s)
Aldegunda	"Holiday"	Gailė Asačiovaitė-Main
~~Alekas~~	~~"Out of Mind"~~	~~Aaron Sibley~~
Augustė Vedrickaitė	"Before You're 6ft Under"	Augustė Vedrickaitė, Paulius Vaicekauskas, Robertas Semeniukas
Basas Pegasas	"Ponai"	Rokas Smilingis, Marius Repšys
Clockwork Creep	"Grow"	Paulius Mscichauskas
Cosmic Bride	"The Devil Lives in Spain"	Natalia Kharetskaya, Bruno Vogel
Elonas Pokanevič	"Someday"	Elonas Pokanevič, Edvardas Mikulis, Rokas Arciševskij
Emilija Valiukevičiūtė	"Overload"	Aurimas Galvelis, Justas Kulikauskas, Emilija Valiukevičiūtė
Emilijana	"Illuminate"	Emilija Katauskaitė, Stoyan Stoyanov, Paul Bester
Erica Jennings	"Back to Myself"	Erica Jennings, Stephen Sims, Deividas Jaroška, Rick Blaskey, Victor Diawara
Gabrea	"Make It Real"	Aurimas Galvelis, Justas Kulikauskas
Gabrielė Goštautaitė	"Over"	Gabrielė Goštautaitė, Robertas Semeniukas
Gebrasy	"Into Your Arms"	Audrius Petrauskas, Faustas Venckus
Geleibra	"Aš jaučiu tave"	Evaldas Mikalauskas, Gabrielė Urbonaitė, Justinas Chachlauskas
Gintarė Korsakaitė	"Fantasy Eyes"	Faustas Venckus, Gintarė Korsakaitė, Elena Jurgaitytė, Audrius Petrauskas
Ieva Zasimauskaitė	"I'll Be There"	Ieva Zasimauskaitė, Martin Hausner
Joseph June	"Deadly"	Vytautas Gumbelevičius
Justė Kraujelytė	"How to Get My Life Back"	Justė Kraujelytė, Kasparas Meginis, Edgaras Žaltauskas
Justin 3 feat. Nanaart	"Something That Is Natural"	Justinas Stanislovaitis, Liucija Nanartavičiūtė
Lolita Zero	"Not Your Mother"	Gytis Ivanauskas, Vitas Vaičiulis
Mary Mo	"Get Up"	Marija Monika Dičiūnė, Tomas Dičiūnas, Paulius Vaicekauskas
Mėnulio Fazė	"Give Me a Sign"	Vladas Chockevičius
~~Monika Linkytė~~	~~"See You Again"~~	~~Monika Linkytė, Vitalij Puzyriov~~
Monika Liu	"Sentimentai"	Monika Liubinaitė
Moosu X	"Love That Hurts"	Justas Kulikauskas, Aurimas Galvelis
Queens of Roses	"Washing Machine"	Michael James Down, Will Taylor, Primož Poglajen, Natalie Palmer
Rūta Loop	"Call Me from the Cold"	Edgaras Žaltauskas, Kasparas Meginis, Rūta Žibaitytė
Sun Francisco	"Dream Again"	Giedrė Ivanova, Maksim Ivanov, Snorre Bergerud
Titas and Benas	"Getting Through This"	Audrius Petrauskas, Faustas Venckus
Urtė Šilagalytė	"Running Chords"	Urtė Šilagalytė, Justas Kulikauskas, Aurimas Galvelis
Vasha	"Nepaleidi"	Viktoras Olechnovičius, Gabrielė Rutkauskienė, Ieva Lapinskaitė
Viktorija Faith	"Walk Through the Water"	Charlie Akin, Viktorija Faith
Viktorija Kajokaitė	"Piece of Universe"	Viktorija Kajokaitė
Vilija	"101"	Vilija Matačiūnaitė
Voldemars Petersons and the Break Hearters	"Up"	Voldemars Petersons
Živilė Gedvilaitė	"Lioness"	Ylva Persson, Linda Persson, Charlie Mason, John Matthews, Paulius Jasiūnas

==== Jury members ====
The jury panel consisted of five members in the heats and the semi-finals, and seven members in the final.

Jury members by show
Jury member	Heats			Semi-finals		Final	Occupation(s)
Jury member	1	2	3	1	2	Final	Occupation(s)
Aistė Smilgevičiūtė	No	No	No	No	No	Yes	singer
Darius Užkuraitis	No	No	Yes	No	No	No	musicologist, LRT Opus senior music editor
Gerūta Griniūtė	Yes	No	Yes	Yes	Yes	Yes	pianist, journalist, television and radio presenter
Giedrė Kilčiauskienė	No	Yes	No	Yes	No	No	singer
Ieva Narkutė	Yes	Yes	Yes	Yes	Yes	Yes	singer
Leonas Somovas	No	Yes	No	No	No	No	composer, producer
Ramūnas Zilnys	Yes	Yes	Yes	Yes	Yes	Yes	music reviewer, presenter, LRT pop music editor-in-chief
Stanislavas Stavickis-Stano	No	No	No	No	Yes	Yes	singer, composer, producer
Vaidotas Valiukevičius	Yes	No	No	Yes	No	Yes	vocalist for the band The Roop
Vytautas Bikus	Yes	Yes	Yes	No	Yes	Yes	composer, producer

==== Shows ====
===== Heats =====
The three heats of the competition aired on 8, 15 and 22 January 2022 and featured the 34 competing entries. The top five advanced to the semi-finals from each heat, while the bottom entries were eliminated.

Heat 1 – 8 January 2022
R/O	Artist	Song	Jury		Televote		Total	Place
R/O	Artist	Song	Votes	Points	Votes	Points	Total	Place
1	Augustė Vedrickaitė	"Before You're 6ft Under"	52	12	317	4	16	2
2	Gabrielė Goštautaitė	"Over"	12	2	138	1	3	11
3	Voldemars Petersons and the Break Hearters	"Up"	11	1	328	5	6	8
4	Joseph June	"Deadly"	39	8	363	7	15	4
5	Aldegunda	"Holiday"	14	3	231	2	5	10
6	Viktorija Faith	"Walk Through the Water"	18	5	92	0	5	9
7	Elonas Pokanevič	"Someday"	11	1	477	10	11	6
8	Sun Francisco	"Dream Again"	31	6	257	3	9	7
9	Urtė Šilagalytė	"Running Chords"	15	4	824	12	16	3
10	Mary Mo	"Get Up"	35	7	400	8	15	5
11	Erica Jennings	"Back to Myself"	52	12	338	6	18	1

Heat 2 – 15 January 2022
R/O	Artist	Song	Jury		Televote		Total	Place
R/O	Artist	Song	Votes	Points	Votes	Points	Total	Place
1	Clockwork Creep	"Grow"	16	4	359	5	9	7
2	Justė Kraujelytė	"How to Get My Life Back"	43	8	691	10	18	2
3	Gabrea	"Make It Real"	16	4	283	2	6	9
4	Titas and Benas	"Getting Through This"	47	10	291	3	13	3
5	Cosmic Bride	"The Devil Lives in Spain"	12	2	93	0	2	11
6	Viktorija Kajokaitė	"Piece of Universe"	1	0	332	4	4	10
7	Emilijana	"Illuminate"	7	1	748	12	13	6
8	Justin 3 feat. Nanaart	"Something That Is Natural"	30	6	258	1	7	8
9	Ieva Zasimauskaitė	"I'll Be There"	56	12	554	8	20	1
10	Moosu X	"Love that Hurts"	30	6	433	7	13	5
11	Queens of Roses	"Washing Machine"	32	7	423	6	13	4

Heat 3 – 22 January 2022
R/O	Artist	Song	Jury		Televote		Total	Place
R/O	Artist	Song	Votes	Points	Votes	Points	Total	Place
1	Basas Pegasas	"Ponai"	19	4	217	2	6	7
2	Rūta Loop	"Call Me from the Cold"	43	8	586	8	16	2
3	Vasha	"Nepaleidi"	15	3	222	3	6	8
4	Geleibra	"Aš jaučiu tave"	10	2	216	1	3	11
5	Vilija	"101"	44	10	183	0	10	6
6	Emilija Valiukevičiūtė	"Overload"	1	0	70	0	0	12
7	Gintarė Korsakaitė	"Fantasy Eyes"	23	5	497	6	11	5
8	Živilė Gedvilaitė	"Lioness"	4	0	253	4	4	10
9	Monika Liu	"Sentimentai"	58	12	2,124	12	24	1
10	Gebrasy	"Into Your Arms"	40	7	576	7	14	4
11	Mėnulio Fazė	"Give Me a Sign"	6	1	349	5	6	9
12	Lolita Zero	"Not Your Mother"	27	6	1,074	10	16	3

===== Semi-finals =====
The two semi-finals of the competition aired on 29 January and 5 February 2022 and featured nine competing entries each. The top four entries advanced to the final from each semi-final, while the bottom entries were eliminated.

Semi-final 1 – 29 January 2022
R/O	Artist	Song	Jury		Televote		Total	Place
R/O	Artist	Song	Votes	Points	Votes	Points	Total	Place
1	Queens of Roses	"Washing Machine"	22	4	648	7	11	4
2	Elonas Pokanevič	"Someday"	14	3	377	2	5	9
3	Emilijana	"Illuminate"	14	3	573	6	9	8
4	Joseph June	"Deadly"	37	7	378	3	10	5
5	Erica Jennings	"Back to Myself"	32	6	474	4	10	6
6	Justė Kraujelytė	"How to Get My Life Back"	54	12	799	10	22	1
7	Gebrasy	"Into Your Arms"	46	10	751	8	18	3
8	Gintarė Korsakaitė	"Fantasy Eyes"	24	5	511	5	10	7
9	Lolita Zero	"Not Your Mother"	42	8	2,281	12	20	2

Semi-final 2 – 5 February 2022
R/O	Artist	Song	Jury		Televote		Total	Place
R/O	Artist	Song	Votes	Points	Votes	Points	Total	Place
1	Mary Mo	"Get Up"	20	4	301	2	6	9
2	Vilija	"101"	30	6	303	3	9	6
3	Urtė Šilagalytė	"Running Chords"	12	2	1,165	10	12	5
4	Ieva Zasimauskaitė	"I'll Be There"	37	8	481	5	13	4
5	Augustė Vedrickaitė	"Before You're 6ft Under"	49	10	934	8	18	2
6	Rūta Loop	"Call Me from the Cold"	37	8	878	7	15	3
7	Titas and Benas	"Getting Through This"	26	5	310	4	9	7
8	Monika Liu	"Sentimentai"	58	12	3,965	12	24	1
9	Moosu X	"Love That Hurts"	16	3	637	6	9	8

===== Final =====
The final of the competition took place on 12 February 2022 and featured the remaining eight entries that qualified from the semi-finals. The final was the only show in the competition to be broadcast live; all other preceding shows were pre-recorded earlier in the week before their airdates. "Sentimentai" performed by Monika Liu was selected as the winner after gaining the most points from both the jury vote and the public vote.

Final – 12 February 2022
R/O	Artist	Song	Jury		Televote		Total	Place
R/O	Artist	Song	Votes	Points	Votes	Points	Total	Place
1	Lolita Zero	"Not Your Mother"	57	8	20,929	10	18	3
2	Ieva Zasimauskaitė	"I'll Be There"	33	4	729	3	7	7
3	Rūta Loop	"Call Me from the Cold"	51	7	1,830	7	14	4
4	Gebrasy	"Into Your Arms"	42	6	1,404	6	12	5
5	Justė Kraujelytė	"How to Get My Life Back"	37	5	1,164	5	10	6
6	Queens of Roses	"Washing Machine"	21	3	1,108	4	7	8
7	Monika Liu	"Sentimentai"	84	12	23,604	12	24	1
8	Augustė Vedrickaitė	"Before You're 6ft Under"	60	10	4,147	8	18	2

==== Ratings ====
Viewing figures by show
Show	Date	Viewing figures	
Show	Date	Nominal	Share
Heat 1	8 January 2022	164,400	16.4%
Heat 2	15 January 2022	152,500	15.2%
Heat 3	22 January 2022	194,000	18.1%
Semi-final 1	29 January 2022	172,400	16.8%
Semi-final 2	5 February 2022	168,400	15.6%
Final	12 February 2022	244,200	25%

=== Promotion ===
Monika Liu made several appearances across Europe to specifically promote "Sentimentai" as the Lithuanian Eurovision entry. On 26 March, Monika Liu performed during the Barcelona Eurovision Party, which was held at the Sala Apolo venue in Barcelona, Spain and hosted by Sharonne and Giuseppe Di Bella. On 3 April, Liu performed during the London Eurovision Party, which was held at the Hard Rock Hotel in London, United Kingdom and hosted by Paddy O'Connell and SuRie. On 7 April, Citi Zēni performed during the Israel Calling event held at the Menora Mivtachim Arena in Tel Aviv, Israel. On 9 April, Liu performed during the Eurovision in Concert event which was held at the AFAS Live venue in Amsterdam, Netherlands and hosted by Cornald Maas and Edsilia Rombley. On 16 April, Liu performed during the PrePartyES 2022 event which was held at the Sala La Riviera venue in Madrid, Spain and hosted by Ruth Lorenzo.

== At Eurovision ==
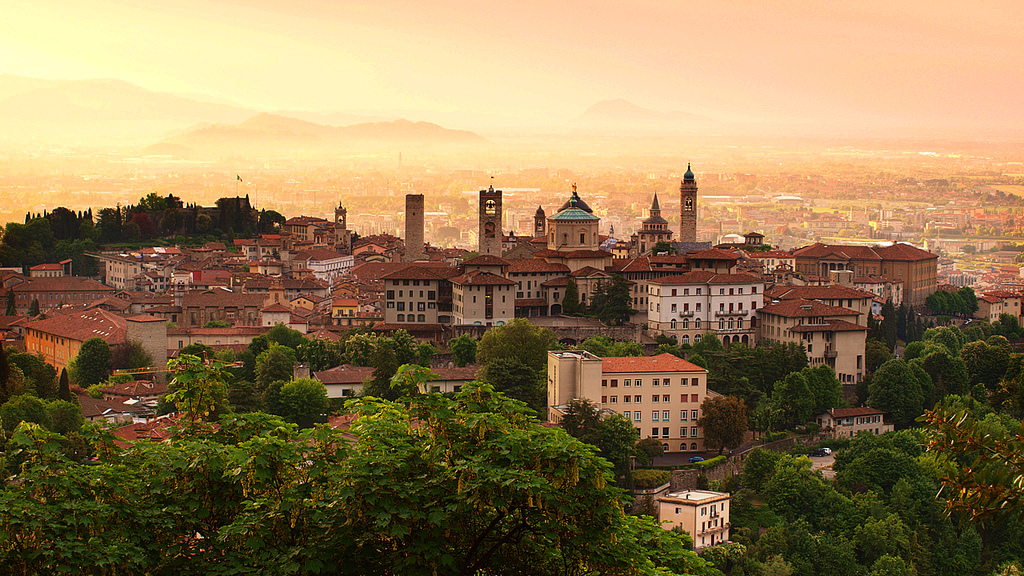
A video postcard introduced Monika Liu's performance in the first semi-final and final of the Eurovision Song Contest 2022. The postcard was filmed in the Italian city of Bergamo and featured virtual projections of Monika across the location.

According to Eurovision rules, all nations with the exceptions of the host country and the "Big Five" (France, Germany, Italy, Spain and the United Kingdom) are required to qualify from one of two semi-finals in order to compete for the final; the top 10 countries from each semi-final progress to the final. The European Broadcasting Union (EBU) split up the competing countries into six different pots based on voting patterns from previous contests, with countries with favourable voting histories put into the same pot. On 25 January 2022, an allocation draw was held which placed each country into one of the two semi-finals, and determined which half of the show they would perform in. Lithuania was placed into the first semi-final, to be held on 10 May 2022, and was scheduled to perform in the first half of the show.

Once all the competing songs for the 2022 contest had been released, the running order for the semi-finals was decided by the shows' producers rather than through another draw, so that similar songs were not placed next to each other. Lithuania was set to perform in position 3, following the entry from Latvia and before the entry from Switzerland. Immediately after the close of the first semi-final, a press conference was held in which each of the artists drew the half of the final of which they would perform in. Lithuania was drawn into the second half of the final and was later selected by the EBU to perform in the show in position number 14, following the entry from Germany and before the entry from Azerbaijan.

The two semi-finals and final were broadcast in Lithuania on LRT televizija and LRT Radijas with commentary by Ramūnas Zilnys. The Lithuanian spokesperson, who announced the top 12-point score awarded by the Lithuanian jury during the final, was Vaidotas Valiukevičius who previously represented Lithuania in 2021 as part of the Roop.

=== Semi-final ===
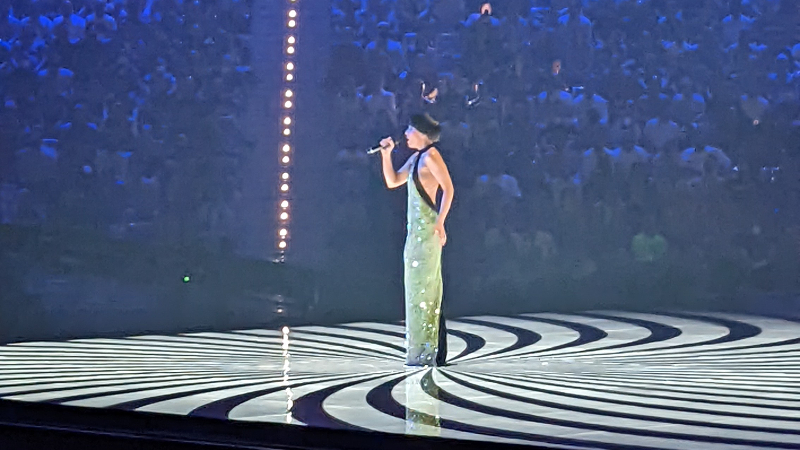
Monika Liu performing during the first semi-final

Monika Liu took part in technical rehearsals on 30 April and 4 May, followed by dress rehearsals on 9 and 10 May. This included the jury show on 9 May where the professional juries of each country watched and voted on the competing entries.

The Lithuanian performance featured Monika Liu in a sparkly dress with diamonds and performing on stage alone with white lights on the kinetic sun and the LED floor displaying black and white geometric lines. The performance also featured a mirror camera effect during the chorus to show a duplicated Liu. The stage director for the Lithuanian performance was Povilas Varvuolis. It was revealed before the first semi-final that the Lithuanian delegation could not achieve what they wanted to on stage due to technical issues during the rehearsals.

At the end of the show, Lithuania was announced as having finished in the top 10 and subsequently qualifying for the final. It was later revealed that Lithuania placed seventh in the semi-final, receiving a total of 159 points: 103 points from the televoting and 56 points from the juries.

=== Final ===
Shortly after the first semi-final, a winners' press conference was held for the 10 qualifying countries. As part of this press conference, the qualifying artists took part in a draw to determine which half of the final they would subsequently participate in. This draw was done in the order the countries appeared in the semi-final running order. Lithuania was drawn to compete in the second half. Following this draw, the shows' producers decided upon the running order of the final, as they had done for the semi-finals. Lithuania was subsequently placed to perform in position 14, following the entry from Germany and before the entry from Azerbaijan.

Monika Liu once again took part in dress rehearsals on 13 and 14 May before the final, including the jury final where the professional juries cast their final votes before the live show. Monika Liu performed a repeat of her semi-final performance during the final on 14 May. Lithuania placed 14th in the final, scoring 128 points: 93 points from the televoting and 35 points from the juries.

=== Voting ===
Below is a breakdown of points awarded to Lithuania during the first semi-final and final. Voting during the three shows involved each country awarding two sets of points from 1–8, 10 and 12: one from their professional jury and the other from televoting. The exact composition of the professional jury, and the results of each country's jury and televoting were released after the final; the individual results from each jury member were also released in an anonymised form. The Lithuanian jury consisted of Aistė Lasytė, Darius Užkuraitis, Ieva Narkutė, Jurga, and Vaidas Baumila. In the first semi-final, Lithuania finished in seventh place out of seventeen entries, marking Lithuania's second consecutive qualification to the final. The first semi-final saw Lithuania receive twelve points from Slovenia in the jury vote and from Ukraine public vote. Over the course of the contest, Lithuania awarded its 12 points to Ukraine in both the jury and televote in the first semi-final and the final.

==== Points awarded to Lithuania ====
Points awarded to Lithuania (Semi-final 1)
Score	Televote	Jury
12 points	Ukraine	Slovenia
10 points	Latvia	Croatia
8 points	Denmark; Norway	Iceland
7 points	Armenia	
6 points	Croatia; France; Moldova; Portugal	Portugal
5 points	Bulgaria; Greece; Iceland; Netherlands; Slovenia	Denmark; Norway
4 points	Austria	
3 points	Switzerland	Switzerland
2 points		France; Italy; Netherlands
1 point	Albania; Italy	Latvia

Points awarded to Lithuania (Final)
Score	Televote	Jury
12 points		
10 points	Latvia; Norway; Ukraine	Slovenia
8 points	Ireland	
7 points	Denmark; Estonia; United Kingdom	Croatia
6 points		
5 points	Georgia	Portugal
4 points	Moldova	
3 points	Croatia; Serbia; Sweden	Denmark
2 points	Armenia; Australia; Cyprus; Finland; Iceland; Poland; Slovenia	Estonia; Montenegro; Norway; Serbia
1 point	North Macedonia; Portugal	Iceland; Latvia

==== Points awarded by Lithuania ====
Points awarded by Lithuania (Semi-final 1)
Score	Televote	Jury
12 points	Ukraine	Ukraine
10 points	Latvia	Switzerland
8 points	Portugal	Netherlands
7 points	Moldova	Portugal
6 points	Netherlands	Greece
5 points	Norway	Denmark
4 points	Armenia	Iceland
3 points	Switzerland	Norway
2 points	Iceland	Latvia
1 point	Denmark	Moldova

Points awarded by Lithuania (Final)
Score	Televote	Jury
12 points	Ukraine	Ukraine
10 points	Sweden	United Kingdom
8 points	Estonia	Portugal
7 points	Portugal	Switzerland
6 points	Spain	Netherlands
5 points	Moldova	Spain
4 points	United Kingdom	Italy
3 points	Italy	Sweden
2 points	Norway	Iceland
1 point	Netherlands	Serbia

==== Detailed voting results ====
The following members comprised the Lithuanian jury:

- Aistė Lasytė – Singer
- Darius Užkuraitis – Musicologist, founder and director of LRT Opus
- Ieva Narkutė – Singer-songwriter
- Jurga Šeduikytė – Singer-songwriter
- Vaidas Baumila – singer, represented Lithuania in the Eurovision Song Contest 2015

Detailed voting results from Lithuania (Semi-final 1)
R/O	Country	Jury							Televote	
R/O	Country	Juror 1	Juror 2	Juror 3	Juror 4	Juror 5	Rank	Points	Rank	Points
01	Albania	13	11	16	16	14	14		16	
02	Latvia	7	8	12	5	10	9	2	2	10
03	Lithuania									
04	Switzerland	3	3	2	1	1	2	10	8	3
05	Slovenia	15	12	13	15	15	15		14	
06	Ukraine	1	2	1	2	3	1	12	1	12
07	Bulgaria	11	9	14	10	11	12		15	
08	Netherlands	2	5	5	3	6	3	8	5	6
09	Moldova	8	10	10	11	12	10	1	4	7
10	Portugal	4	4	3	6	4	4	7	3	8
11	Croatia	14	16	11	13	13	13		13	
12	Denmark	9	13	6	8	2	6	5	10	1
13	Austria	16	15	15	14	16	16		12	
14	Iceland	10	7	9	4	7	7	4	9	2
15	Greece	6	1	4	7	5	5	6	11	
16	Norway	5	6	8	9	8	8	3	6	5
17	Armenia	12	14	7	12	9	11		7	4

Detailed voting results from Lithuania (Final)
R/O	Country	Jury							Televote	
R/O	Country	Juror 1	Juror 2	Juror 3	Juror 4	Juror 5	Rank	Points	Rank	Points
01	Czech Republic	16	16	16	23	24	20		22	
02	Romania	24	23	24	24	23	24		15	
03	Portugal	3	5	3	2	5	3	8	4	7
04	Finland	23	24	19	20	21	23		13	
05	Switzerland	4	2	8	8	4	4	7	18	
06	France	19	19	20	22	22	22		16	
07	Norway	9	20	13	12	14	15		9	2
08	Armenia	21	17	21	9	13	18		19	
09	Italy	7	14	5	4	7	7	4	8	3
10	Spain	6	9	11	6	3	6	5	5	6
11	Netherlands	5	3	4	10	9	5	6	10	1
12	Ukraine	1	1	1	1	1	1	12	1	12
13	Germany	8	18	18	11	19	16		14	
14	Lithuania									
15	Azerbaijan	10	13	10	15	15	13		24	
16	Belgium	11	15	15	19	12	17		17	
17	Greece	14	21	22	7	8	11		23	
18	Iceland	15	4	23	14	10	9	2	20	
19	Moldova	18	22	17	21	20	21		6	5
20	Sweden	12	11	6	5	6	8	3	2	10
21	Australia	17	10	9	13	11	12		21	
22	United Kingdom	2	7	2	3	2	2	10	7	4
23	Poland	20	12	12	18	16	19		11	
24	Serbia	13	8	7	16	18	10	1	12	
25	Estonia	22	6	14	17	17	14		3	8
