= M.A.M.A. awards =

Lithuanian music awards

- Presented by: TV3 Lithuania
- First award: 2012
- Website: muzikosapdovanojimai.lt

The M.A.M.A. awards (Lithuanian: Muzikos Asociacijos Metų Apdovanojimai; English: Music Association of the Year Awards) is an annual music awards ceremony in Lithuania.

== Host cities ==
Edition	Date	City	Venue	Nominations
1st	8 January 2012	Kaunas	Žalgiris Arena	11
2nd	11 January 2013	Kaunas	Žalgiris Arena	13
3rd	10 January 2014	Kaunas	Žalgiris Arena	11
4th	30 January 2015	Kaunas	Žalgiris Arena	16
5th	29 January 2016	Kaunas	Žalgiris Arena	16
6th	27 January 2017	Kaunas	Žalgiris Arena	16
7th	26 January 2018	Kaunas	Žalgiris Arena	15
8th	25 January 2019	Kaunas	Žalgiris Arena	15
9th	31 January 2020	Kaunas	Žalgiris Arena	16
10th	27 March 2021	Kaunas	Žalgiris Arena	17
11th	28 January 2022	Kaunas	Žalgiris Arena	18
12th	27 January 2023	Kaunas	Žalgiris Arena	16
13th	26 January 2024	Kaunas	Žalgiris Arena	15
14th	25 January 2025	Kaunas	Žalgiris Arena	15

== Nominations ==
Current nominations

Nomination	Winner (2024 awards)	Most wins
M.A.M.A. Top 40 most listened	Silvester Belt - "Luktelk"	No repeated winners
Breakthrough	Silvester Belt	No repeated winners
Best Electronic Act	DJ Jovani	Beissoul ir Einius (3)
Best Pop Act	Jessica Shy	SEL (3)
Best Alternative Act	Shower	Alina Orlova (2), Solo Ansamblis (2)
Best Hip Hop Group/Performer of the Year	Despotin Fam	G&G Sindikatas (4)
Traditional Pop Group/Performer of the Year	Žemaitukai	Inga Jankauskaitė (3)
Progressive Pop Group/Performer of the Year	Free Finga	Evgenya Redko (3)
Rock Group/Performer of the Year	Abudu	ba. (5)
Group of the Year	Kamanių Šilelis	Leon Somov & Jazzu (6)
Concert Group/Performer of the Year	Jessica Shy	SEL (3)
Album of the Year	Free Finga – Plastika	No repeated winners
Performer of the Year	Jessica Shy	Vidas Bareikis (2)
Song of the Year	Rokas Yan, Monika Liu, Vaidas Baumila – "Gegužis"	No repeated winners
Video Clip of the Year	Despotin Fam – "Greičio"	No repeated winners
