= 2016 M.A.M.A. awards =

6th Music association's awards of the year
- Date: January 27, 2017
- Location: Žalgiris Arena, Kaunas, Lithuania
- Hosted by: Jogaila Morkūnas & Indrė Morkūnienė

Highlights
- Most awards: Donny Montell (3)
- Most nominations: Donny Montell (5)

Television/radio coverage
- Network: TV3 Lithuania

The 6th Annual M.A.M.A. Awards were held on January 27, 2017. The TV3 Lithuania network broadcast the show live from Žalgiris Arena in Kaunas. The nominations were announced on December 14, 2016.

== Nominees ==
Note: Winners are listed in bold.

=== Best Female Act ===
- **Erica Jennings**
- Ieva Narkutė
- Monika Linkytė
- Ingrida Valinskienė
- GJan

=== Best Male Act ===
- Saulius Prūsaitis
- Merūnas
- **Donny Montell**
- Daddy Was A Milkman
- Ironvytas

=== Breakthrough of the Year ===
- **Daddy Was A Milkman**
- Solo ansamblis
- Wolfsome
- Sisters Of Wire
- Liepa Maknavičiūtė

=== Best Pop Act ===
- Erica Jennings
- **Donny Montell**
- Saulius Prūsaitis
- Lemon Joy
- Merūnas

=== Best Rock Act ===
- **Freaks On Floor**
- Colors Of Bubbles
- Wolfsome
- Sisters On Wire
- Movo

=== Best Alternative Act ===
- **Solo ansamblis**
- Deeper Upper
- Without Letters
- Sheep Got Waxed
- Ministry Of Echology

=== Best Electronic Act ===
- **Daddy Was A Milkman**
- Black Water
- Keymono
- Radistai DJs
- Deep Shoq

=== Best Hip Hop Act ===
- Ironvytas
- Mad Money
- Despotin Fam
- Yga
- **Mesijus & Munpauz**

=== Best Band ===
- Freaks On Floor
- Colors Of Bubbles
- Lemon Joy
- Lilas & Innomine
- **Leon Somov & Jazzu**

=== Best Live Act ===
- Marijonas Mikutavičius
- **Leon Somov & Jazzu**
- Donny Montell
- Merūnas
- Lilas & Innomine

=== Best Album ===
- Waves – Freaks On Floor
- Muzika – Lietuvai – Merūnas
- **#BLCK – Donny Montell**
- Roboxai – Solo ansamblis
- Vaikas iš didelės raidės – Saulius Prūsaitis

=== Best Song ===
- "Norim šokti" – Saulius Prūsaitis
- "I've Been Waiting For This Night" – Donny Montell
- "Tu privalai skambėt" – Lilas & Innomine
- **"Lietuvos istorijos repas" – Šventinis Bankuchenas**
- "Gaila" – Leon Somov & Jazzu
