= Lithuania in the Eurovision Song Contest 2015 =

- Eurovision Song Contest 2015
- Country: Lithuania
- Selection process: "Eurovizijos" dainų konkurso nacionalinė atranka
- Selection date: 21 February 2015

Competing entry
- Song: "This Time"
- Artist: Monika Linkytė and Vaidas Baumila
- Songwriters: Vytautas Bikus; Monika Linkytė; Monika Liubinaitė

Placement
- Semi-final result: Qualified (7th, 67 points)
- Final result: 18th, 30 points

Participation chronology

Lithuania was represented at the Eurovision Song Contest 2015 with the song "This Time", written by Vytautas Bikus, Monika Liubinaitė, and Monika Linkytė. The song was performed by Monika Linkytė and Vaidas Baumila. The Lithuanian broadcaster Lithuanian National Radio and Television (LRT) organised the national final "Eurovizijos" dainų konkurso nacionalinė atranka (Eurovision Song Contest national selection) in order to select the Lithuanian entry for the 2015 contest in Vienna, Austria. The national final took place over eight weeks and involved 12 artists and 12 songs competing in two different competitive streams. The results of each show were determined by the combination of votes from a jury panel and a public vote, and "This Time" performed by Monika Linkytė and Vaidas Baumila eventually emerged as the winner following the final.

Lithuania was drawn to compete in the second semi-final of the Eurovision Song Contest which took place on 21 May 2015. Performing as the opening entry for the show in position 1, "This Time" was announced among the top 10 entries of the second semi-final and therefore qualified to compete in the final on 23 May. It was later revealed that Lithuania placed seventh out of the 17 participating countries in the semi-final with 67 points. In the final, Lithuania performed in position 7 and placed 18th out of the 27 participating countries, scoring 30 points.

== Background ==
Prior to the 2015 contest, Lithuania had participated in the Eurovision Song Contest 15 times since its first entry in 1994. The nation’s best placing in the contest was sixth, which it achieved in 2006 with the song "We Are the Winners", performed by LT United. Following the introduction of semi-finals in 2004, Lithuania, to this point, had managed to qualify for the final six times. In the 2014 contest, "Attention" performed by Vilija failed to qualify to the final.

For the 2015 contest, the Lithuanian national broadcaster, Lithuanian National Radio and Television (LRT), broadcast the event within Lithuania and organised the selection process for the nation's entry. Other than the internal selection of their debut entry in 1994, Lithuania has selected their entry consistently through a national final procedure. LRT confirmed their intentions to participate at the 2015 Eurovision Song Contest on 4 June 2014 and announced the organization of "Eurovizijos" dainų konkurso nacionalinė atranka, which would be the national final to select Lithuania's entry for Vienna.

== Before Eurovision ==
=== "Eurovizijos" dainų konkurso nacionalinė atranka ===
"Eurovizijos" dainų konkurso nacionalinė atranka (Eurovision Song Contest national selection) was the national final format developed by LRT in order to select Lithuania's entry for the Eurovision Song Contest 2015. The competition involved an eight-week-long process that commenced on 3 January 2015 and concluded with a winning song on 14 February 2015 and a winning artist on 21 February 2015. The eight shows took place at the LRT studios in Vilnius and were hosted by Simona Nainė and Arūnas Valinskas. Audrius Giržadas replaced Valinskas as a host during the fourth show. The shows were broadcast on LRT televizija, LRT Lituanica, and LRT Radijas, as well as online via the broadcaster's website lrt.lt.

==== Format ====
The 2015 competition consisted of eight shows and involved artists competing independently from songs, potentially being paired with any of the selected songs. Rule changes included the ability for artists to indicate a preference to perform a particular song on their application. Should the artist and their song reach the final, the artist and the composers were to agree to allow the other finalists to perform the song. In the first six shows, the 12 competing artists performed covers that related to the theme of that particular show and the potential Eurovision songs. The voting results from the first show were combined with those of the second show and the first artist was eliminated. During each of the third to sixth shows, one artist was eliminated and the remaining three artists advanced in the competition. Starting from the third show, the 12 potential Eurovision songs competed online on a weekly basis and a total of nine songs were eliminated following the sixth show, leaving three songs remaining. The seventh show was the competition's semi-final, where only the winning song was selected from the remaining three songs, while the eighth show was the final, where the winning artist-song combination was selected from the remaining three artists. Monetary prizes were also awarded to both the winning artist and songwriters. The Lithuanian Copyright Protection Association (LATGA) sponsored 15,000 LTL, awarded to the songwriters in order to encourage further development of the song in an aim to achieve international success, while the Music Association Annual Awards (MAMA) sponsored 5,000 LTL, awarded to the artist in order to assist in their preparation for the Eurovision Song Contest.

The results of each of the eight shows were determined by the 50/50 combination of votes from a jury panel and public televoting. The jury votes in all shows consisted of a combination of a Lithuanian jury panel and an international jury panel. During the first seven shows, the members of the Lithuanian panel were required to come to a consensus in order to assign one set of points, which were added to the points awarded by each member of the international panel. In the final, the Lithuanian and international panels voted together. The public could vote through telephone and SMS voting, and the ranking developed by both streams of voting was converted to points from 1-8, 10 and 12 and assigned based on the number of competing artists in the respective show. Ties in the elimination shows and the semi-final were decided in favour of the entry that received the most votes from the public, while in the final, a tie would be decided in favour of the entry that was awarded the most points by the jury.

==== Competing artists and songs ====
On 31 October 2014, LRT opened two separate submission forms: one for artists and another for songwriters to submit their songs. The submission deadline for both applications concluded on 15 December 2014. On 18 December 2014, LRT announced the 12 artists selected for the competition. The 12 potential Eurovision songs selected from 168 submissions received were announced for listening and voting on 13 January 2015. The song "Skęstu" was originally entered in Lithuanian, however, the song was also translated and performed in English during the fourth elimination show.

==== Artist and song progress in the shows ====
===== Artists =====
Artist	Shows 1 + 2	Show 3	Show 4	Show 5	Show 6	Show 7	Show 8 (Final)
Monika Linkytė	5th	1st	5th	3rd	1st	No elimination	1st
Vaidas Baumila	1st	5th	6th	2nd	3rd	No elimination	1st
Mia	4th	7th	1st	1st	2nd	No elimination	2nd
Edgaras Lubys	3rd	2nd	3rd	4th	4th	Eliminated (Show 6)	
Jurgis Brūzga	9th	9th	4th	5th	5th	Eliminated (Show 6)	
Liepa Mondeikaitė	7th	3rd	2nd	6th	Eliminated (Show 5)		
Neringa Šiaudikytė	11th	8th	7th	7th	Eliminated (Show 5)		
Tadas Juodsnukis	2nd	4th	8th	Eliminated (Show 4)			
Milita Daikerytė	8th	6th	Withdrew (Show 4)				
Reda Striškaitė	6th	10th	Eliminated (Show 3)				
Wilma La	10th	11th	Eliminated (Show 3)				
Rollikai	12th	Eliminated (Show 2)					

===== Songs =====
Song	Songwriter(s)	Place	Result
"This Time"	Vytautas Bikus, Monika Liubinaitė	1st	Winner (Show 7)
"The Right Way"	Tina Almqvist Hilli, Daniel Persson	2nd	Eliminated (Show 7)
"Dangerous (S.O.S.)"	Camilla Gottschalck, Christina Schilling, Henrik Szabo, Daniel Nilsson, Amir Aly	3rd	Eliminated (Show 7)
"Not Perfect"	Edgaras Lubys	4th	Eliminated (Show 6)
"Feel My Love"	José Juan Santana Rodríguez	5th–9th	Eliminated (Show 6)
"No More Tears"	Patrik Öhlund, Madelene Hamberg	5th–9th	Eliminated (Show 6)
"Flying"	Leon Somov, Linas Strockis, Monika Linkytė	5th–9th	Eliminated (Show 6)
"Skęstu"	Leon Somov, Linas Strockis, Monika Linkytė	5th–9th	Eliminated (Show 6)
"Sound of Colours"	Daði Georgsson, Íris Hólm, Jonas Gladnikoff, Camilla Gottschalck, Christina Schilling	5th–9th	Eliminated (Show 6)
"Take My Love"	Brandon Stone	5th–9th	Eliminated (Show 6)
"Es tut mir nicht leid"	Natalja Chareckaja	10th–11th	Eliminated (Show 4)
"Factory Hearts"	Darragh Reck, Barry Grace, Paul Murphy	10th–11th	Eliminated (Show 4)
"Say You Love Me"	Edgaras Lubys	12th	Eliminated (Show 3)

==== Jury members ====
The Lithuanian jury panel consisted of four members in the elimination shows and the semi-final, and two members in the final. The international jury panel consisted of two members in the first elimination show, and three members in the remaining shows.

Lithuanian jury members by show
Jury member	Elimination shows						Semi-final	Final	Occupation(s)
Jury member	1	2	3	4	5	6	Semi-final	Final	Occupation(s)
Audrius Giržadas	No	Yes	No	No	No	No	No	No	LRT televizija chief producer
Darius Užkuraitis	No	No	No	Yes	Yes	Yes	No	No	musicologist, LRT Opus director
Edmundas Seilius	Yes	Yes	No	No	No	No	No	No	opera singer
Gediminas Zujus	No	No	No	Yes	No	No	Yes	No	producer
Gintaras Rinkevičius	No	No	No	No	Yes	Yes	No	No	conductor
Ieva Norkūnienė	No	No	No	Yes	No	No	No	No	choreographer
Juozas Liesis	Yes	No	No	No	No	No	No	No	journalist
Justė Arlauskaitė	No	No	Yes	No	No	No	No	No	singer
Linas Adomaitis	Yes	Yes	No	No	No	No	No	No	musician
Ramūnas Zilnys	Yes	Yes	Yes	Yes	Yes	Yes	Yes	Yes	music reviewer
Rosita Čivilytė	No	No	No	No	Yes	Yes	Yes	Yes	singer
Sigutė Stonytė	No	No	Yes	No	No	No	No	No	opera singer
Vytautas Lukočius	No	No	Yes	No	No	No	Yes	No	conductor

International jury members by show
Jury member	Country	Elimination shows						Semi-final	Final	Occupation
Jury member	Country	1	2	3	4	5	6	Semi-final	Final	Occupation
Eric Lehmann	Luxembourg	No	No	No	No	No	No	No	Yes	President of OGAE Luxembourg
Lela Tsurtsumia	Georgia	Yes	Yes	Yes	Yes	Yes	Yes	Yes	No	singer
Peter Jenner	United Kingdom	No	Yes	No	No	No	No	No	No	music manager
Ralfs Eilands	Latvia	No	No	Yes	Yes	Yes	Yes	Yes	Yes	singer
René Romkes	Netherlands	Yes	Yes	Yes	Yes	Yes	Yes	Yes	Yes	organiser of the Eurovision in Concert event

==== Elimination shows ====
The six elimination shows of the competition aired between 3 January and 7 February 2015. In the first two shows, the artists performed covers that related to the theme of that particular show: Lithuanian hit songs in the first show and worldwide hit songs in the second show. The results of the two shows were combined and one artist was eliminated. The remaining 11 artists in the competition performed the potential Eurovision songs starting from the third show. The artists each performed one song between the third and fifth shows and two songs in the sixth show, and one artist was eliminated per show.

The group Rollikai, which was eliminated following the second show, recorded a performance for the song "Sound of Colours" for the third show, however, the performance was not part of the show as they were previously eliminated. Following the third show, Milita Daikerytė withdrew from the competition due to illness.

Key

Eliminated

Show 1 – 3 January 2015
R/O	Artist	Song (original artists)	Jury		Televote		Total	Place
R/O	Artist	Song (original artists)	Votes	Points	Votes	Points	Total	Place
1	Mia	"Man patinka" (Džordana Butkutė)	12	3	278	6	9	5
2	Reda Striškaitė	"Kai sirpsta vyšnios Suvalkijoj" (Vytautas Kernagis)	6	2	226	5	7	8
3	Edgaras Lubys	"Širdis ant balto sniego" (Natalija Bunkė)	23	10	308	8	18	3
4	Monika Linkytė	"Besieliai"	21	7	130	0	7	9
5	Tadas Juodsnukis	"Nakty" (Kastytis Kerbedis)	23	10	366	12	22	1
6	Wilma La	"Laužo šviesa" (Foje)	0	0	142	1	1	12
7	Rollikai	"Violeta" (Kastytis Kerbedis)	6	2	39	0	2	11
8	Liepa Mondeikaitė	"Aš mylėjau tave tau nežinant" (Aktorių trio)	14	4	206	4	8	6
9	Vaidas Baumila	"Aš tik žmogus"	29	12	307	7	19	2
10	Milita Daikerytė	"Tarp tavęs ir manęs"	21	7	329	10	17	4
11	Jurgis Brūzga	"1000 dienų"	15	5	170	3	8	7
12	Neringa Šiaudikytė	"Meilę skolingas tau" (Stasys Povilaitis)	4	0	164	2	2	10

Detailed Jury Votes
R/O	Artist	Lithuanian Jury	L. Tsurtsumia	R. Romkes	Total
1	Mia	3	7	2	12
2	Reda Striškaitė	1	1	4	6
3	Edgaras Lubys	12	10	1	23
4	Monika Linkytė	8	8	5	21
5	Tadas Juodsnukis	10	6	7	23
6	Wilma La				0
7	Rollikai		3	3	6
8	Liepa Mondeikaitė	6		8	14
9	Vaidas Baumila	7	12	10	29
10	Milita Daikerytė	4	5	12	21
11	Jurgis Brūzga	5	4	6	15
12	Neringa Šiaudikytė	2	2		4

Show 2 – 10 January 2015
R/O	Artist	Song (original artists)	Jury		Televote		Total	Place
R/O	Artist	Song (original artists)	Votes	Points	Votes	Points	Total	Place
1	Edgaras Lubys	"Get Lucky" (Daft Punk feat. Pharrell Williams)	27	8	294	6	14	3
2	Mia	"Chandelier" (Sia)	27	8	250	4	12	4
3	Tadas Juodsnukis	"Here I Go Again" (Whitesnake)	18	3	277	5	8	8
4	Neringa Šiaudikytė	"Euphoria" (Loreen)	9	2	153	0	2	11
5	Vaidas Baumila	"Hallelujah" (Leonard Cohen)	38	12	341	10	22	2
6	Reda Striškaitė	"If I Were a Boy" (Beyoncé)	7	1	304	8	9	7
7	Liepa Mondeikaitė	"What a Wonderful World" (Louis Armstrong)	21	5	202	1	6	9
8	Rollikai	"Let's Get Loud" (Jennifer Lopez)	7	1	143	0	1	12
9	Wilma La	"Set Fire to the Rain" (Adele)	2	0	228	2	2	10
10	Monika Linkytė	"Queen of the Night" (Whitney Houston)	35	10	492	12	22	1
11	Jurgis Brūzga	"Locked Out of Heaven" (Bruno Mars)	22	6	250	4	10	6
12	Milita Daikerytė	"Only Love Can Hurt Like This" (Paloma Faith)	19	4	295	7	11	5

Detailed Jury Votes
R/O	Artist	Lithuanian Jury	P. Jenner	L. Tsurtsumia	R. Romkes	Total
1	Edgaras Lubys	7	5	7	8	27
2	Mia	5	2	10	10	27
3	Tadas Juodsnukis	8	4	6		18
4	Neringa Šiaudikytė	4	3	2		9
5	Vaidas Baumila	10	10	12	6	38
6	Reda Striškaitė		1	5	1	7
7	Liepa Mondeikaitė	2	7		12	21
8	Rollikai	1		1	5	7
9	Wilma La				2	2
10	Monika Linkytė	12	8	8	7	35
11	Jurgis Brūzga	3	12	3	4	22
12	Milita Daikerytė	6	6	4	3	19

Show 3 – 17 January 2015
R/O	Artist	Song	Jury		Televote		Total	Place
R/O	Artist	Song	Votes	Points	Votes	Points	Total	Place
1	Vaidas Baumila	"This Time"	34	10	343	2	12	5
2	Mia	"Say You Love Me"	18	4	511	6	10	7
3	Reda Striškaitė	"Es tut mir nicht leid"	13	2	206	0	2	10
4	Edgaras Lubys	"Not Perfect"	30	8	685	10	18	2
5	Neringa Šiaudikytė	"Skęstu"	17	3	466	5	8	8
6	Liepa Mondeikaitė	"Feel My Love"	8	1	703	12	13	3
7	Tadas Juodsnukis	"No More Tears"	25	6	566	7	13	4
8	Milita Daikerytė	"Dangerous (S.O.S.)"	27	7	382	4	11	6
9	Monika Linkytė	"The Right Way"	41	12	616	8	20	1
10	Jurgis Brūzga	"Take My Love"	19	5	375	3	8	9
11	Wilma La	"Factory Hearts"	0	0	263	1	1	11

Detailed Jury Votes
R/O	Artist	Lithuanian Jury	R. Eilands	L. Tsurtsumia	R. Romkes	Total
1	Vaidas Baumila	12	10	8	4	34
2	Mia	6	2	5	5	18
3	Reda Striškaitė	1	3	2	7	13
4	Edgaras Lubys	10	4	10	6	30
5	Neringa Šiaudikytė	2	8	4	3	17
6	Liepa Mondeikaitė	4	1	1	2	8
7	Tadas Juodsnukis	8	6	3	8	25
8	Milita Daikerytė	3	7	7	10	27
9	Monika Linkytė	5	12	12	12	41
10	Jurgis Brūzga	7	5	6	1	19
11	Wilma La					0

Show 4 – 24 January 2015
R/O	Artist	Song	Jury		Televote		Total	Place
R/O	Artist	Song	Votes	Points	Votes	Points	Total	Place
1	Edgaras Lubys	"This Time"	35	10	680	6	16	3
2	Liepa Mondeikaitė	"Take My Love"	21	5	775	12	17	2
3	Tadas Juodsnukis	"Factory Hearts"	17	3	549	3	6	8
4	Mia	"The Right Way"	36	12	741	10	22	1
5	Vaidas Baumila	"Not Perfect"	33	8	619	5	13	6
6	Monika Linkytė	"Flying"	30	7	699	7	14	5
7	Jurgis Brūzga	"No More Tears"	29	6	732	8	14	4
8	Neringa Šiaudikytė	"Feel My Love"	19	4	586	4	8	7

Detailed Jury Votes
R/O	Artist	Lithuanian Jury	R. Eilands	L. Tsurtsumia	R. Romkes	Total
1	Edgaras Lubys	10	10	10	5	35
2	Liepa Mondeikaitė	7	3	3	8	21
3	Tadas Juodsnukis	5	4	4	4	17
4	Mia	12	5	7	12	36
5	Vaidas Baumila	6	8	12	7	33
6	Monika Linkytė	4	12	8	6	30
7	Jurgis Brūzga	8	6	5	10	29
8	Neringa Šiaudikytė	3	7	6	3	19

Show 5 – 31 January 2015
R/O	Artist	Song	Jury		Televote		Total	Place
R/O	Artist	Song	Votes	Points	Votes	Points	Total	Place
1	Jurgis Brūzga	"This Time"	27	7	686	5	12	5
2	Liepa Mondeikaitė	"Skęstu"	26	5	795	6	11	6
3	Mia	"Take My Love" (Note: Performed as a duet between Mia and Edgaras Lubys.)	29	8	1,116	12	20	1
4	Edgaras Lubys	"Take My Love"	27	7	1,040	8	15	4
5	Neringa Šiaudikytė	"Dangerous (S.O.S.)"	20	4	103	4	8	7
6	Vaidas Baumila	"The Right Way"	38	10	1,042	10	20	2
7	Monika Linkytė	"No More Tears"	41	12	994	7	19	3

Detailed Jury Votes
R/O	Artist	Lithuanian Jury	R. Eilands	L. Tsurtsumia	R. Romkes	Total
1	Jurgis Brūzga	5	8	8	6	27
2	Liepa Mondeikaitė	6	6	4	10	26
3	Mia	12	4	6	7	29
4	Edgaras Lubys	10	5	7	5	27
5	Neringa Šiaudikytė	4	7	5	4	20
6	Vaidas Baumila	8	12	10	8	38
7	Monika Linkytė	7	10	12	12	41

Show 6 – 7 February 2015
R/O	Artist	Song	Jury		Televote		Total	Place
R/O	Artist	Song	Votes	Points	Votes	Points	Total	Place
1	Mia	"Feel My Love"	60	7	2,712	12	19	2
1	Mia	"Flying"	60	7	2,712	12	19	2
2	Monika Linkytė	"This Time" (Note: Performed as a duet with Vaidas Baumila.)	80	10	2,554	10	20	1
2	Monika Linkytė	"Dangerous (S.O.S.)"	80	10	2,554	10	20	1
3	Vaidas Baumila	"This Time" (Note: Performed as a duet with Monika Linkytė.)	86	12	2,334	7	19	3
3	Vaidas Baumila	"Take My Love"	86	12	2,334	7	19	3
4	Edgaras Lubys	"Not Perfect"	61	8	2,451	8	16	4
4	Edgaras Lubys	"No More Tears"	61	8	2,451	8	16	4
5	Jurgis Brūzga	"The Right Way"	57	6	917	6	12	5
5	Jurgis Brūzga	"Sound of Colours"	57	6	917	6	12	5

Detailed Jury Votes
R/O	Artist	Song	Lithuanian Jury	R. Eilands	L. Tsurtsumia	R. Romkes	Total
1	Mia	"Feel My Love"	8	6	6	7	60
1	Mia	"Flying" (Skęstu)"	12	6	7	8	60
2	Monika Linkytė	"This Time"	10	12	8	10	80
2	Monika Linkytė	"Dangerous (S.O.S.)"	10	10	8	12	80
3	Vaidas Baumila	"This Time"	12	10	10	12	86
3	Vaidas Baumila	"Take My Love"	8	12	12	10	86
4	Edgaras Lubys	"Not Perfect"	6	7	12	6	61
4	Edgaras Lubys	"No More Tears"	7	7	10	6	61
5	Jurgis Brūzga	"The Right Way"	7	8	7	8	57
5	Jurgis Brūzga	"Sound of Colours"	6	8	6	7	57

==== Song selection ====
The 12 potential Eurovision songs were evaluated by the public through an internet vote on LRT's voting platform over three rounds. The first round resulted in the elimination of one song, while the second round resulted in the elimination of two songs. The results of first two rounds were determined solely by public voting on LRT's internet platform. In the third round, the top three songs, as determined by the 50/50 combination of votes from a jury panel and the internet vote, advanced to the semi-final, while the bottom eight were eliminated. An additional round was to take place following the second round resulting in the elimination of two songs, however, it was cancelled as voting was extended by a week until 25 January 2014.

Key

Qualifier Eliminated

First Round – 13–17 January 2015
Song	Votes	Place
"Dangerous (S.O.S.)"	—	—
"Es tut mir nicht leid"	—	—
"Factory Hearts"	—	—
"Feel My Love"	—	—
"No More Tears"	—	—
"Not Perfect"	—	—
"Say You Love Me"	144	12
"Skęstu"	—	—
"Sound of Colours"	—	—
"Take My Love"	—	—
"The Right Way"	—	—
"This Time"	—	—

Second Round – 19–25 January 2015
Song	Place
"Dangerous (S.O.S.)"	—
"Es tut mir nicht leid"	10-11
"Factory Hearts"	10-11
"Feel My Love"	8-9
"No More Tears"	—
"Not Perfect"	—
"Skęstu"	—
"Sound of Colours"	—
"Take My Love"	8-9
"The Right Way"	—
"This Time"	—

Third Round – 3–10 February 2014
Song	Jury	Internet Vote		Total	Place
Song	Jury	Votes	Points	Total	Place
"Dangerous (S.O.S.)"	4	8,411	12	16	3
"Es tut mir nicht leid"	—	—	—	—	—
"Factory Hearts"	—	—	—	—	—
"Feel My Love"	—	—	—	—	—
"No More Tears"	—	—	—	—	—
"Not Perfect"	—	—	—	—	4
"Skęstu"	—	—	—	—	—
"Sound of Colours"	—	—	—	—	—
"Take My Love"	—	—	—	—	—
"The Right Way"	10	8,025	10	20	1
"This Time"	12	4,619	6	18	2

===== Semi-final =====
The semi-final of the competition aired on 14 February 2015 and featured each of the remaining three artists that qualified from the sixth elimination show each performing the remaining three potential Eurovision songs. "This Time" was selected as the winning song after gaining the most points from both the jury vote and the public vote.

Semi-final – 14 February 2015
R/O	Song	Jury		Televote		Total	Place
R/O	Song	Votes	Points	Votes	Points	Total	Place
1	"The Right Way"	8	10	319	8	18	3
2	"This Time"	11	12	1,429	12	24	1
3	"Dangerous (S.O.S.)"	5	8	898	10	18	2

Detailed Jury Votes
R/O	Song	Lithuanian Jury	R. Eilands	L. Tsurtsumia	R. Romkes	Total
1	"The Right Way"	2	3	2	1	8
2	"This Time"	3	2	3	3	11
3	"Dangerous (S.O.S.)"	1	1	1	2	5

===== Final =====
The final of the competition took place on 21 February 2015 and featured the remaining three artists that qualified from the sixth elimination show each performing three songs: two covers of their choice and the winning song selected from the semi-final, "This Time". The final was the only show in the competition to be broadcast live; all other preceding shows were pre-recorded earlier in the week before their airdates. Vaidas Baumila and Monika Linkytė performed together as a duet at the request of Vytautas Bikus, one of the songwriters of "This Time", and were selected as the winners after gaining the most points from both the jury vote and the public vote. In addition to the performances of the competing artists, interval acts included the 2013 Latvian entrant PeR, performing the song "Smile", and Mélanie René, performing the 2015 Swiss entry "Time to Shine".

Final – 21 February 2015
R/O	Artist	Song (Original artists)	Jury		Televote		Total	Place
R/O	Artist	Song (Original artists)	Votes	Points	Votes	Points	Total	Place
1	Mia	"Take a Look at Me Now"	5	10	12,746	10	20	2
1	Mia	"Dangerous (S.O.S.)"	5	10	12,746	10	20	2
1	Mia	"This Time"	5	10	12,746	10	20	2
2	Monika Linkytė and Vaidas Baumila	"Saulės pėdomis" (Linas and Simona)	10	12	13,902	12	24	1
2	Monika Linkytė and Vaidas Baumila	"Tiktai tu" (Vaidas Baumila)	10	12	13,902	12	24	1
2	Monika Linkytė and Vaidas Baumila	"This Time"	10	12	13,902	12	24	1

Detailed Jury Votes
R/O	Artist	R. Zilnys	R. Čivilytė	R. Eilands	E. Lehmann	R. Romkes	Total
1	Mia	1	1	1	1	1	5
2	Monika Linkytė and Vaidas Baumila	2	2	2	2	2	10

=== Preparation ===
On 7 March, LRT broadcast the support concert Būkime kartu, where Lithuanian viewers could call to donate funds to support the Lithuanian Eurovision participation. The concert featured guests Leon Somov and Justė Arlauskaitė, Rosita Čivilytė, and Jurgis Brūzga, and raised €20,843 from the public donations. In late March, Monika Linkytė and Vaidas Baumila filmed the official music video for "This Time" at the Qpolo bar in Vilnius. The video, directed by Algina Navickaitė, was released on 13 April. Lithuanian and French language versions of "This Time" were released on 22 April. The Lithuanian version had lyrics written by Vytautas Bikus, while lyrics for the French version were written by Dominique Dufaut.

=== Promotion ===
Monika Linkytė and Vaidas Baumila made several appearances across Europe to specifically promote "This Time" as the Lithuanian Eurovision entry. On 17 April, Linkytė and Baumila performed during the Eurovision PreParty Riga, which was organised by OGAE Latvia and held at the Palladium Concert Hall in Riga, Latvia. On 18 April, the duet performed during the Eurovision in Concert event, which was held at the Melkweg venue in Amsterdam, Netherlands and hosted by Cornald Maas and Edsilia Rombley.

== At Eurovision ==
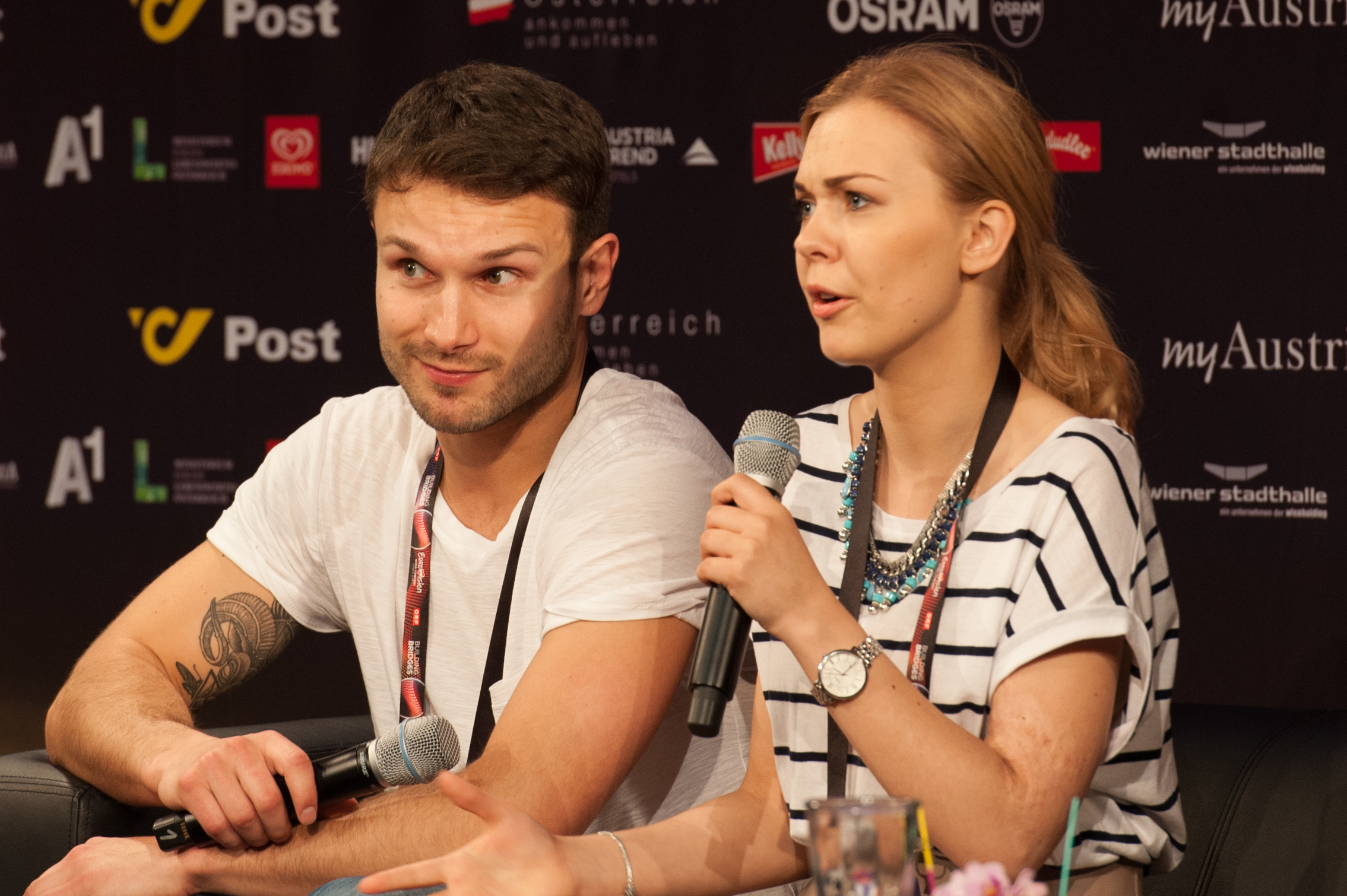
Vaidas Baumila and Monika Linkytė during a press meet and greet

According to Eurovision rules, all nations with the exceptions of the host country and the "Big Five" (France, Germany, Italy, Spain and the United Kingdom) are required to qualify from one of two semi-finals in order to compete for the final; the top 10 countries from each semi-final progress to the final. In the 2015 contest, Australia also competed directly in the final as an invited guest nation. The European Broadcasting Union (EBU) split up the competing countries into five different pots based on voting patterns from previous contests, with countries with favourable voting histories put into the same pot. On 26 January 2015, an allocation draw was held which placed each country into one of the two semi-finals, as well as which half of the show they would perform in. Lithuania was placed into the second semi-final, to be held on 21 May 2015, and was scheduled to perform in the first half of the show.

Once all the competing songs for the 2015 contest had been released, the running order for the semi-finals was decided by the shows' producers rather than through another draw, so that similar songs were not placed next to each other. Lithuania was set to open the show performing in position 1, before the entry from Ireland.

The two semi-finals and final were broadcast in Lithuania on LRT televizija and LRT Radijas with commentary by Darius Užkuraitis. The Lithuanian spokesperson who announced the Lithuanian votes during the final was Ugnė Galadauskaitė.

=== Semi-final ===
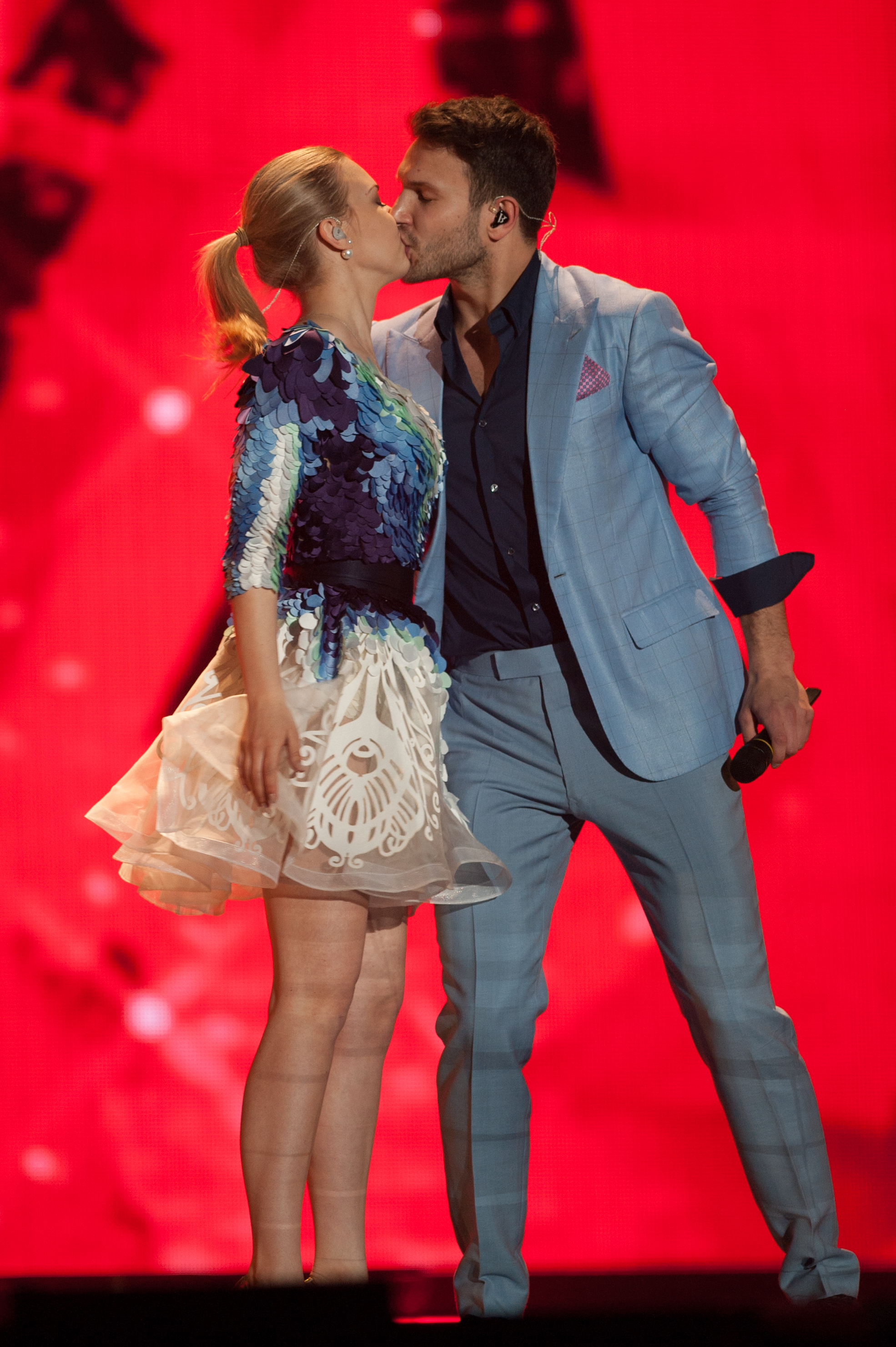
Monika Linkytė and Vaidas Baumila during a rehearsal before the second semi-final

Monika Linkytė and Vaidas Baumila took part in technical rehearsals on 13 and 16 May, followed by dress rehearsals on 20 and 21 May. This included the jury final, where professional juries of each country, responsible for 50 percent of each country's vote, watched and voted on the competing entries.

The Lithuanian performance featured Monika Linkytė and Vaidas Baumila performing choreography on stage with two female and two male backing vocalists. The LED screens displayed bright colourful rays in shades of red, blue, yellow and orange. The performance also featured a kiss shared between Linkytė and Baumila, with the two female backing vocalists and two male backing vocalists kissing as well. Vaidas Baumila's bluish-grey costume was designed by Andrius Sergejenko, while Monika Linkytė's blue, pink, and white dress was designed by Kristina Kalinauskaitė along with citizens of Lithuania, who were able to cut-out petals featured on the dress in the colour of their choice at special booths set up in Klaipėda, Panevėžys and Vilnius in April 2015. The two female backing vocalists that joined Linkytė and Baumila were Rūta Žibaitytė and Justė Kraujalytė, while the two male backing vocalists were Dainotas Varnas and Jurijus Veklenko. Veklenko would go on to represent Lithuania in the Eurovision Song Contest 2019.

At the end of the show, Lithuania was announced as having finished in the top 10 and subsequently qualifying for the grand final. It was later revealed that the Lithuania placed seventh in the semi-final, receiving a total of 67 points.

=== Final ===
Shortly after the second semi-final, a winner's press conference was held for the 10 qualifying countries. As part of this press conference, the qualifying artists took part in a draw to determine which half of the grand final they would subsequently participate in. This draw was done in the order the countries were announced during the semi-final. Lithuania was drawn to compete in the first half. Following this draw, the shows' producers decided upon the running order of the final, as they had done for the semi-finals. Lithuania was subsequently placed to perform in position 7, following the entry from Armenia and before the entry from Serbia.

Monika Linkytė and Vaidas Baumila once again took part in dress rehearsals on 22 and 23 May before the final, including the jury final, where the professional juries cast their final votes before the live show. The duet performed a repeat of their semi-final performance during the final on 23 May. At the conclusion of the voting, Lithuania placed 18th with 30 points.

=== Voting ===
Voting during the three shows consisted of 50 percent public televoting and 50 percent from a jury deliberation. The jury consisted of five music industry professionals who were citizens of the country they represent, with their names published before the contest to ensure transparency. This jury was asked to judge each contestant based on: vocal capacity; the stage performance; the song's composition and originality; and the overall impression by the act. In addition, no member of a national jury could be related in any way to any of the competing acts in such a way that they cannot vote impartially and independently. The individual rankings of each jury member were released shortly after the grand final.

Following the release of the full split voting by the EBU after the conclusion of the competition, it was revealed that Lithuania had placed 16th with both the public televote and the jury vote in the final. In the public vote, Lithuania scored 44 points, while with the jury vote, Lithuania scored 31 points. In the second semi-final, Lithuania placed sixth with the public televote, with 98 points, and 10th with the jury vote, scoring 52 points.

Below is a breakdown of points awarded to Lithuania and awarded by Lithuania in the second semi-final and grand final of the contest, and the breakdown of the jury voting and televoting conducted during the two shows:

==== Points awarded to Lithuania ====
Points awarded to Lithuania (Semi-final 2)
Score	Country
12 points	
10 points	Latvia; Norway
8 points	
7 points	Azerbaijan; Cyprus; Ireland
6 points	
5 points	
4 points	Australia; Iceland; Israel; Malta
3 points	San Marino; Switzerland; United Kingdom
2 points	
1 point	Czech Republic

Points awarded to Lithuania (Final)
Score	Country
12 points	
10 points	
8 points	
7 points	Ireland; Latvia
6 points	Norway
5 points	
4 points	United Kingdom
3 points	Georgia
2 points	Estonia
1 point	Denmark

==== Points awarded by Lithuania ====
Points awarded by Lithuania (Semi-final 2)
Score	Country
12 points	Latvia
10 points	Sweden
8 points	Norway
7 points	Slovenia
6 points	Azerbaijan
5 points	Poland
4 points	Israel
3 points	Cyprus
2 points	Ireland
1 point	Iceland

Points awarded by Lithuania (Final)
Score	Country
12 points	Latvia
10 points	Sweden
8 points	Estonia
7 points	Belgium
6 points	Georgia
5 points	Norway
4 points	Slovenia
3 points	Australia
2 points	Azerbaijan
1 point	Italy

==== Detailed voting results ====
The following members comprised the Lithuania jury:

- Lauras Lučiūnas (jury chairperson) – music producer
- Jolita Vaitkevičienė – choir conductor
- Jurga Čekatauskaitė – journalist, author of song lyrics
- Jurgis Brūzga – singer
- Rosita Čivilytė – singer

Detailed voting results from Lithuania (Semi-final 2)
R/O	Country	L. Lučiūnas	J. Vaitkevičienė	J. Čekatauskaitė	J. Brūzga	R. Čivilytė	Jury Rank	Televote Rank	Combined Rank	Points
01	Lithuania									
02	Ireland	5	13	5	6	13	7	12	9	2
03	San Marino	14	16	16	16	16	16	10	14	
04	Montenegro	15	11	15	13	10	14	14	15	
05	Malta	13	5	12	7	4	6	16	12	
06	Norway	4	3	2	3	1	3	5	3	8
07	Portugal	12	6	10	15	14	13	15	16	
08	Czech Republic	16	12	14	12	11	15	7	11	
09	Israel	10	10	13	8	7	9	6	7	4
10	Latvia	1	2	3	2	3	2	1	1	12
11	Azerbaijan	2	4	6	4	8	4	9	5	6
12	Iceland	7	15	8	10	9	10	11	10	1
13	Sweden	3	1	1	1	2	1	2	2	10
14	Switzerland	9	9	9	14	15	12	13	13	
15	Cyprus	11	7	7	11	6	8	8	8	3
16	Slovenia	6	8	4	5	5	5	4	4	7
17	Poland	8	14	11	9	12	11	3	6	5

Detailed voting results from Lithuania (Final)
R/O	Country	L. Lučiūnas	J. Vaitkevičienė	J. Čekatauskaitė	J. Brūzga	R. Čivilytė	Jury Rank	Televote Rank	Combined Rank	Points
01	Slovenia	9	14	4	14	11	9	7	7	4
02	France	17	24	19	15	17	19	23	21	
03	Israel	8	10	17	17	9	11	12	12	
04	Estonia	3	8	5	5	12	7	2	3	8
05	United Kingdom	15	9	15	9	25	13	17	17	
06	Armenia	24	12	22	24	20	22	22	24	
07	Lithuania									
08	Serbia	18	22	21	20	19	21	24	25	
09	Norway	7	3	1	7	3	3	10	6	5
10	Sweden	5	1	2	1	2	2	4	2	10
11	Cyprus	13	17	12	13	21	14	14	14	
12	Australia	14	6	13	2	4	8	9	8	3
13	Belgium	6	4	7	6	5	5	5	4	7
14	Austria	20	11	14	8	8	10	18	16	
15	Greece	19	23	10	18	16	17	25	22	
16	Montenegro	12	18	23	22	14	18	21	18	
17	Germany	11	19	9	11	13	12	16	15	
18	Poland	10	15	16	23	15	16	11	13	
19	Latvia	2	2	3	3	1	1	1	1	12
20	Romania	23	16	24	21	26	25	15	19	
21	Spain	22	25	20	16	22	23	19	20	
22	Hungary	21	20	18	25	24	24	20	23	
23	Georgia	1	7	8	4	6	4	8	5	6
24	Azerbaijan	4	5	6	10	7	6	13	9	2
25	Russia	26	13	26	19	10	20	3	11	
26	Albania	25	26	25	26	23	26	26	26	
27	Italy	16	21	11	12	18	15	6	10	1
