= Garbanotas =

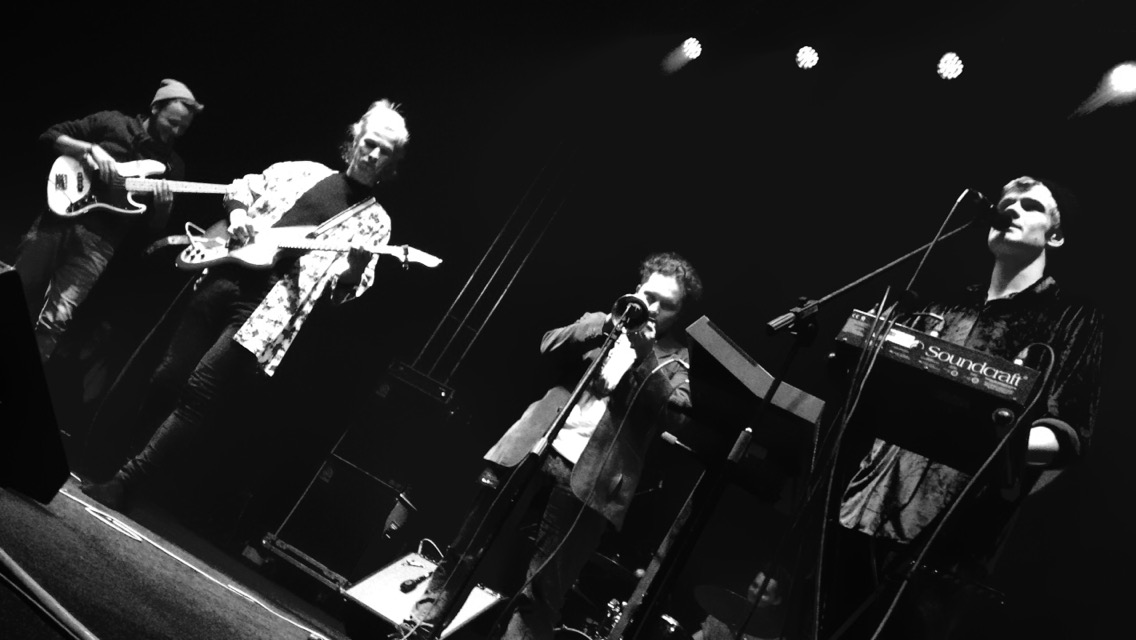
- Garbanotas Bosistas live in Lithuania

Background information
- Also known as: Garbanotas Bosistas (former name)
- Origin: Vilnius, Lithuania
- Genres: Indie rock, neo-psychedelia, indie folk
- Years active: 2008-present
- Label: Pappa Goose Records
- Members: Šarūnas Joneikis; Mantas Joneikis; Ignas Kasikauskas; Paulius vaškas
- Past members: Augustinas Čobotas; Narimantas Besakirskas; Jonas Narbutas; Mantas Augustaitis; Kipras Pagačiukas

Garbanotas ("The Curly One"), formerly Garbanotas Bosistas is a Lithuanian neo-psychedelia rock and indie folk rock band, which started playing in 2008. The band consists of four members, vocalist Šarūnas Joneikis, guitarist Mantas Joneikis, bassist Paulius Vaškas and drummer Ignas Kasikauskas. In 2016, the band was voted the best act by the audience at Tallinn music week festival (Estonia) and won the Best Alternative Act in the Lithuanian M.A.M.A. awards. Garbanotas mainly perform in their homeland Lithuania but also tour around the Baltic states and Europe. Garbanotas became the first Lithuanian band to perform at The great escape festival in the UK, and played successful shows at the Europavox (France), MENT (slovenia), Liverpool Sound city ( UK) and Reeperbahn, Germany. In 2018, Garbanotas changed their name overnight on all social media platforms from "Garbanotas Bosistas" to "Garbanotas".

== History ==
Šarūnas Joneikis and Mantas Joneikis are brothers and were both born in Vilnius. Both studied at Vilnius University. They started playing the guitar at a young age, and ultimately started creating songs in their 20s. The inspiration came mostly from Queen, The Beatles, Led Zeppelin, Arklio Galia and Senas Kuinas. The band name came from an idea of a bassist with curly hair not because of his looks, but more about the personality and attitude towards music, also because the Joneikis brothers were jealous of people with curly hair when they were younger. Later Augustinas Čobotas and Narimantas Besakirskas joined the band and soon they decided to use their own material which resulted in the release of their first EP Venera in 2012.

After two years of live performances and also appearing in such music projects as "Kaunas acoustics", LRT Opus live, "Vilnius temperature", and also in Latvia's biggest music festival Positivus, Garbanotas bosistas started recording their new album called Above Us and before that, Kipras Pugačiukas and Jonas Narbutas joined the band replacing the previous bassist and drummer. The band's sound also changed from indie folk to psychedelic rock. Their first Lithuanian song "Gėlėta Suknia" came from the new album in the spring of 2015, and finally the album was released on 4 May 2015. The following year the band toured around Europe and the Baltics presenting their new album and played at The Great Escape Festival, Liverpool Sound City festival, Sofar Sounds London and Oxford, England. In 2 April 2016, Garbanotas Bosistas became the first Lithuanian - indie psychedelic rock band to play at the Tallinn music week festival. A year after in 2017 Garbanotas Bosistas released their second studio album "Room for you" recorded, mixed and produced By Snorre Bergerud at Ymir studio in Vilnius, Lithuania and mastered by Jaime Gomez Arrellano. The English-language album is heavily inspired by 1960s Psychedelic rock and Californian hippie aesthetics. Ramūnas Zilnys praised "Room for you" rating it a 9 out of 10 and calling one of the best-sounding Lithuanian rock albums of the 2010s. Following the release of "Room for you" Garbanotas Bosistas continued to play gigs like their Album presentation concert that took place at the "Menų fabrikas Loftas", on december 21st, 2017.

== Members ==
- Šarūnas Joneikis – vocals, guitar, synths
- Mantas Joneikis – guitar, backing vocals, synths
- Paulius Vaškas – Bass
- Ignas kasikauskas - drums

Additional live members

- Gabrielė Tamutytė – vocals
- Motiejus Bazaras - Piano
- Sauja - Choir, vocals
- Kazimieras Jusinskas - saxophone

== Discography ==
- Venera EP (2012)
- Above Us (2015), Pappa Goose Records
- Room for You (2017), with two singles "Last Summer’s Day" and "Long Ago Far Away"
- Paskutinė Saulė (2018)
- Remixes EP (2019)
- Two singles : "Hey Love" (2021) and "Sailing" (2022)
- Heart in a Plastic Bag (2022)
- Three singles: "Upė", "Tave visą" (2022) and "Iš džiaugsmo" (2023)
- Kūnas Dangaus (2023)
- Oro princai (2025)
- Two singles: "Burės Burtas" (2025 ft. Jautì) "Iš naujo" (2025)
- Vieta ir Laikas Nesvarbu ir Užsimerkę Susitiksim (2026), with two singles "Ilgesys" and "Perlas" (2026)

== Awards and nominations ==
=== M.A.M.A. awards ===
Year	Nominee / work	Award	Result
2016	"Garbanotas Bosistas"	Alternative act of the year	Won
