= Monika Liu =

Lithuanian singer and songwriter (born 1988)

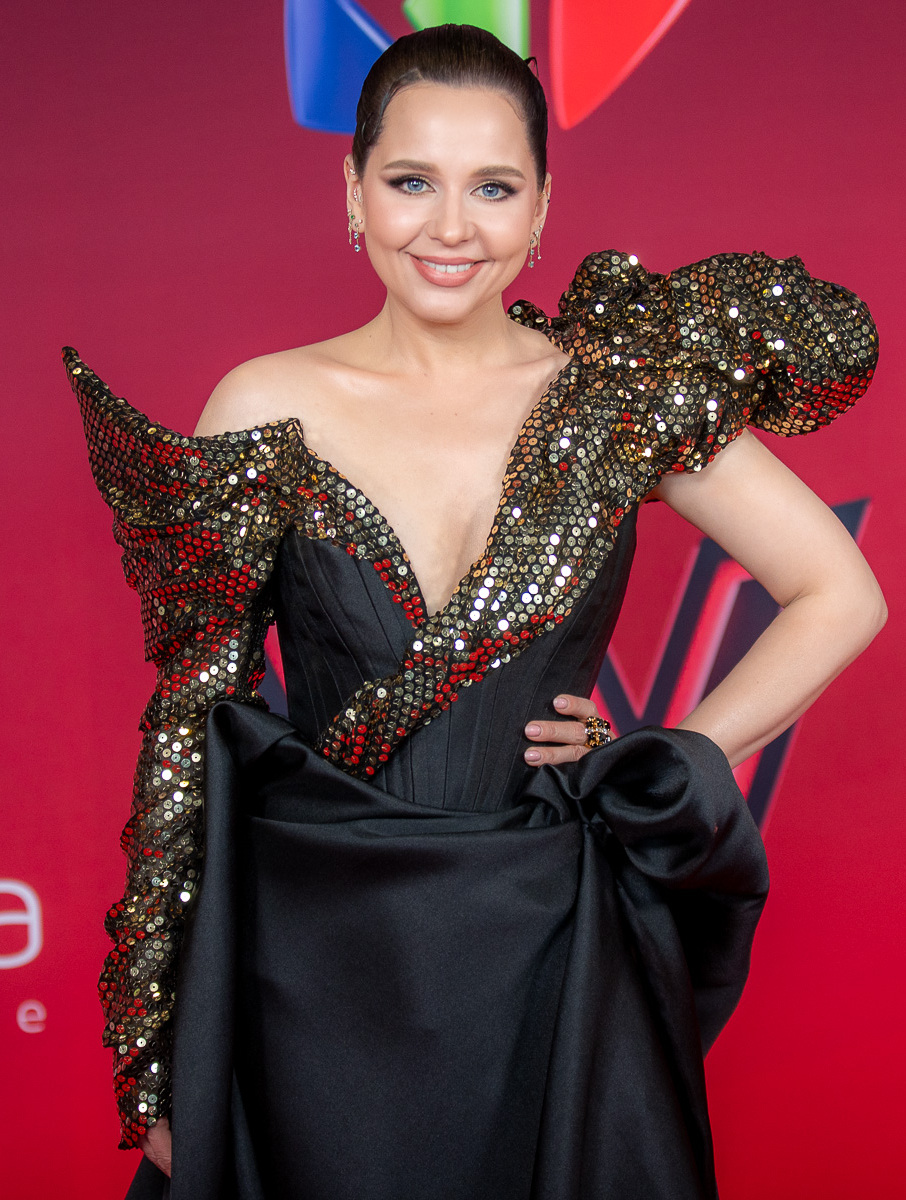
- Liubinaitė in 2023

Background information
- Born: Monika Liubinaitė; 9 February 1988 (age 38); Klaipėda, Lithuania
- Genres: Alternative Pop, Jazz Pop, Soul, Retro Pop, Electropop
- Occupations: Singer; songwriter
- Instruments: Vocals; piano
- Years active: 2003-present

Monika Liubinaitė (Lithuanian: [ˈmɔnʲɪkɐ lʲʊbʲɪˈnaɪ̯tʲeː]; born 9 February 1988), known professionally as Monika Liu, is a Lithuanian singer-songwriter. She represented Lithuania in the Eurovision Song Contest 2022 in Turin, Italy with the song "Sentimentai". Liu was announced as one of the qualifiers and took 14th place at the Grand Final.

== Early life ==
Liu was born in Klaipėda, in the family of a music teacher and a musician. She studied at Klaipėda Ąžuolynas Gymnasium, and attended ballet lessons when she was little.

== Career ==
Liu began her musical career at the age of five when she started to play the violin. She discovered singing ten years later, and won the Dainų dainelė (lit. 'Song of Songs') competition in 2004. Upon graduation from high school, Liu studied jazz music and vocal studies at the Faculty of Music of Klaipėda University, and later went to the United States, where she studied at Berklee College of Music in Boston. After leaving the college, Liu moved to London, where continued to compose songs. She has worked with the famous producer Mario Basanov, collaborated with the electronic music family Silence, recorded the song "Ne Vakar" (lit. 'Not Yesterday') with the band Sel, and appeared on the LRT television project Auksinis balsas (lit. 'Golden Voice').

Liu's early work has been described as a "strongly electro-pop (and less bizarre) version of Björk". On 23 May 2019, she was announced as a judge of The Voice Lithuania. Liu has also served as a jury member of The Masked Singer Lithuania during its 2021 season. On 20 April 2020, she released her second album and first vinyl record Melodija. The record was recorded in the United Kingdom in collaboration with producer Miles James, sound director Christoph Skirl and musician Marius Aleksa.

=== 2022: Eurovision Song Contest ===
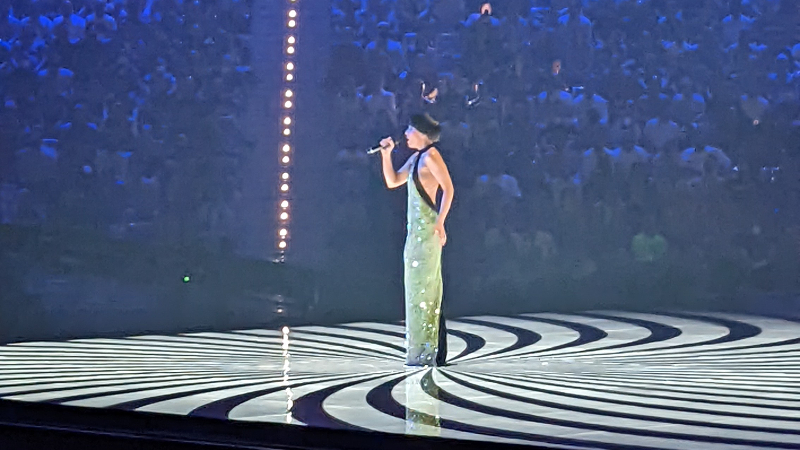
Liubinaitė performing at the first semi-final of the Eurovision Song Contest 2022 in May 2022.

On 7 December 2021, Liu was announced as a participant of Pabandom iš naujo! 2022, the Lithuanian national selection for the Eurovision Song Contest 2022, with the song "Sentimentai". The song was publicly released on 18 January 2022, and reached the top of Lithuanian singles chart shortly afterwards. Liu performed in the third heat and advanced to the semi-finals and final, eventually winning the competition, thus winning the right to represent Lithuania in the Eurovision Song Contest 2022 in Turin, Italy.

== Filmography ==
- Aš matau tavo balsą (2022) — Celebrity panelist

== Discography ==
=== Studio albums ===
Title	Details	Peak chart positions
Title	Details	LTU
I Am	Released: 18 June 2015; Label: Self-released; Formats: Physical, digital download, streaming	—
Lünatik	Released: 24 October 2019; Label: Self-released; Formats: Digital download, streaming	—
Kodėl Tu Čia?	Released: 6 May 2023; Label: Self-released; Formats: Physical, digital download, streaming	10
Šešėliai Lange (with Los Secretos de Pablo)	Released: 12 August 2026; Label: Self-released; Formats: Digital download, streaming	35
"—" denotes an album that did not chart or was not released.

=== Extended plays ===
Title	Details
Melodija	Released: 17 April 2020; Label: Self-released; Formats: Physical, digital download, streaming

=== Singles ===
==== As lead artist ====
Title	Year	Peak chart positions		Album or EP
Title	Year	LTU	SWE Heat.	Album or EP
"Journey to the Moon"	2015	*	—	I Am
"On My Own"	2016	*	—	I Am
"Hello"	2017	*	—	Non-album single
"Komm zu mir"	2019	—	—	Lünatik
"Resist No More"	2019	—	—	Lünatik
"Falafel"	2019	—	—	Lünatik
"No Matter What"	2019	—	—	Lünatik
"Sometimes I Loved You Sometimes You Loved Me"	2019	—	—	Lünatik
"Detective"	2019	—	—	Lünatik
"I Wanna Be a Man"	2019	—	—	Lünatik
"I Got You"	2019	—	—	Lünatik
"Vaikinai trumpais šortais"	2019	31	—	Melodija
"Troškimas"	2020	—	—	Melodija
"Sentimentai"	2022	1	14	Kodėl Tu Čia?
"Bossa"	2022	23	—	Kodėl Tu Čia?
"Dai Boh" (with Alyona Alyona and Jerry Heil)	2022	—	—	Dai Boh
"Šampanas (bul bul bul)"	2022	42	—	Kodėl Tu Čia?
"Kodėl tu čia?"	2023	89	—	Kodėl Tu Čia?
"Į tave"	2023	—	—	Kodėl Tu Čia?
"Nemylėjau tavęs" (with Gintariniai Laikai)	2023	62	—	Non-album singles
"Gegužis" (with Rokas Yan and Vaidas Baumila)	2024	2	—	Non-album singles
"Atostogų duetas" (with Teleduetas)	2024	—	—	Non-album singles
"—" denotes a single that did not chart or was not released in that territory. " * " denotes that the chart did not exist at that time.

==== As featured artist ====
Title	Year	Peak chart positions	Album
Title	Year	LTU	Album
"In So" (XOA featuring Monika Liu)	2016	—	One011
"Laisvė" (SKAMP featuring Monique, Bjelle, Monika Liu, Kazimieras Likša & Future Cello)	2018	—	Non-album single
"Ne vakar" (SEL featuring Monika Liu)	2019	—	Aš Kaip Žąsis
"Sea" (Domas Strupinskas featuring Monika Liu)	2019	—	Live From Big Jelly Studios
"Ten, kur tu" (Jautì featuring Monika Liu)	2022	92	Meilė
"Gal ne rytoj" (with various artists)	2022	97	Non-album single
"Beržas" (Free Finga featuring Monika Liu)	2024	2	Plastika
"—" denotes a single that did not chart or was not released.

== Awards and nominations ==
Award	Year	Category	Nominee(s)	Result	Ref.
M.A.M.A. Awards	2015	Best Female Act	Herself	Nominated	
M.A.M.A. Awards	2015	Breakthrough of the Year	Herself	Nominated	
M.A.M.A. Awards	2020	Best Female Act	Herself	Nominated	
M.A.M.A. Awards	2020	Song of the Year	"Vaikinai trumpais šortais"	Nominated	
Eurovision Awards	2022	Best Look	Herself	Nominated	
Eurovision Awards	2022	Best Hair	Herself	Won	
M.A.M.A. Awards	2023	Pop Artist or Group of the Year	Herself	Nominated	
M.A.M.A. Awards	2023	Artist of the Year	Herself	Nominated	
M.A.M.A. Awards	2023	Song of the Year	"Sentimentai"	Won	
M.A.M.A. Awards	2024	Artist of the Year	Herself	Nominated	
M.A.M.A. Awards	2024	Pop Artist or Group of the Year	Herself	Nominated	
M.A.M.A. Awards	2025	Concert Group or Performer of the Year	Herself	Nominated	
M.A.M.A. Awards	2025	M.A.M.A. Top 40	"Gegužis" (with Rokas Yan and Vaidas Baumila)	Nominated	
M.A.M.A. Awards	2025	Song of the Year	"Gegužis" (with Rokas Yan and Vaidas Baumila)	Won	
M.A.M.A. Awards	2025	Song of the Year	"Beržas" (with Free Finga)	Nominated	

Awards and achievements
Preceded by The Roop with "Discoteque"	Lithuania in the Eurovision Song Contest; 2022	Succeeded by Monika Linkytė with "Stay"
