= Sentimentai =

2022 song by Monika Liu

Single by Monika Liu

from the album Kodėl Tu Čia?
- Released: 18 January 2022
- Genre: Disco; jazz; lounge
- Length: 8:04 (album version); 3:00 (Eurovision version)
- Songwriter: Monika Liubinaitė
- Producer: Miles James

Monika Liu singles chronology
"Troškimas" (2020)	"Sentimentai" (2022)	"Bossa" (2022)

Music video
- "Sentimentai" on YouTube

Eurovision Song Contest 2022 entry
- Country: Lithuania
- Artist: Monika Liu
- Language: Lithuanian
- Composer: Monika Liubinaitė
- Lyricist: Monika Liubinaitė

Finals performance
- Semi-final result: 7th
- Semi-final points: 159
- Final result: 14th
- Final points: 128

Entry chronology
- ◄ "Discoteque" (2021)
- "Stay" (2023) ►

"Sentimentai" (Lithuanian: [sʲɛnʲtʲɪˈmʲæ̌ːntˠɐɪ]; lit. 'Sentiments') is a song by Lithuanian singer and songwriter Monika Liu. It represented Lithuania at the Eurovision Song Contest 2022 in Turin, Italy, after winning the competition Pabandom iš Naujo! 2022. It marks the first time since 1994 that Lithuania has sent a song fully performed in Lithuanian and the first since 1999 in a domestic language. The single reached number one in Lithuania.

"Sentimentai" was placed into the first semi-final of Eurovision 2022 on 10 May 2022 and qualified for the grand final, which took place on 14 May 2022. At the grand final, Lithuania took 14th place with a total of 128 points.

== Charts ==
Chart performance for "Sentimentai"
Chart (2022)	Peak position
Lithuania (AGATA)	1
Sweden Heatseeker (Sverigetopplistan)	14
UK Singles Downloads (Official Charts)	92
