= Neringa Šiaudikytė =

Lithuanian singer and songwriter

- Born: 12 October; Kaunas, Lithuania
- Citizenship: Lithuania
- Occupations: Singer, songwriter

Neringa Šiaudikytė (born 12 October) is a Lithuanian singer and songwriter. She is best known for appearances in The Voice and her songs Echo, Su Tavim and Thank You.

== Early life and education ==
Šiaudikytė was born in Kaunas in Lithuania. Her mother used to be a professional piano player. When Šiaudikytė was 6 years old she joined a musical school and eventually began learning to play the piano. She started singing in a private band in her city and gained much popularity leading to her participating in international singing competitions around Europe. Later, when she was 14 years, Šiaudikytė enrolled in the Kauno Aleksandro Kačanausko musical school in Kaunas. She also acquired a bachelor's degree in history from VDU.

== Career ==
Šiaudikytė started her career in 2012 when she signed with The Voice of Lithuania. She joined the Violeta-Terasoviene team and went to the finals. In the same year, Šiaudikytė joined the Eurovision song contest of Lithuania and performed the song "Used to be" written by Raigardas Tautkus.

In 2013, Šiaudikytė was selected for the Balso Deives project and he did a special performance night in Theatre Arena.

In 2014, Šiaudikytė participated in the TV show and competition Žvaigždžių duetai with famous actor Aistis Mickevičius which was broadcast on the LNK TV channel.

In 2015, Šiaudikytė participated in the "UNIVERSONG" international vocal competition in Tenerif, Spain, and later in the Kaunas Talent international vocal competition where she acquired a runners up position. Šiaudikytė performance at the GALA concert of "Kaunas Talent" in "Zalgirio Arena" in Kaunas.

In 2018, Šiaudikytė again participated in the "Carpathia festival" International vocal competition. First time in this competition's history, a Lithuanian singer won the GRAND PRIX award.

== Discography ==
=== Singles ===
- Echo
- Thank you
- All over
- Isejai
- Never Knew Love
- Run Away
- Viena
- Used to be
- Su Tavim
- Alone
- Man Gera
- One More Night
- Nepalik Manes
