= Happyendless =

- Origin: Vilnius, Lithuania
- Genres: New wave, rock, electronic
- Years active: 1998–present
- Members: Andrius Kauklys; Marius Narbutis
- Past members: Saulius Prūsaitis (2005–2015); Darius Vaičiulis (1999–2006)

Happyendless is a Lithuanian new wave, rock and electronic band formed in Vilnius in 1998. In 2007, the band released their "Power Forever" single and became one of the most popular bands in Lithuania at the time. Their first studio album Room For Mistakes was released in 2008, followed by Cinema in 2011. After the departure of their lead singer, Saulius Prūsaitis, who left to pursue a solo career in 2012, the band entered a hiatus until 2018, when the remaining members reunited and recorded the band's third album Kinetika (Kinetics).

== Band members ==
- Andrius Kauklys (1998–present)
- Marius Narbutis (1998–present)
- Saulius Prūsaitis (2005–2012)
- Darius Vaičiulis (1999–2006)

== Discography ==
=== Studio albums ===
- 2008 – Room For Mistakes
- 2011 – Cinema
- 2018 – Kinetika
- 2020 – Utopia

=== Singles ===
- 2007 – "Power Forever"
- 2008 – "Hello Come On"
- 2008 – "No Tomorrow"
- 2009 – "Sweet Sweet Super Sweet"
- 2010 – "Golden Olympic"
- 2016 – "Gravitacija"

=== Compilation albums ===
- 2002 – Akvariumas

== Awards and nominations ==
| Year | Title | Award | Nominated work | Result |
|---|---|---|---|---|
| 2000 | BRAVO Music Awards | Best Producers | Happyendless | Nominated |
| 2001 | RADIOCENTRAS Music Awards | Best Lithuanian Dance Act | Happyendless | Nominated |
| 2007 | "Pravda Naujokų" Awards | Best Song | "Power Forever" | Won |
| 2007 | A.LT Awards | Best Video | "Power Forever" | Won |
| 2007 | Pravda 1 Minutės kino festivalis | Most Downloaded Song | "Power Forever" | Won |
| 2008 | MTV Europe Music Awards | Best Baltic Act | Happyendless | Won |
| 2008 | MTV Europe Music Awards | Europe's Favourite Act | Happyendless | Nominated |
| 2010 | Sidabrinė gervė | Best Movie Composer | Zero 2 soundtrack | Won |
