= G&G Sindikatas =

Lithuanian music group

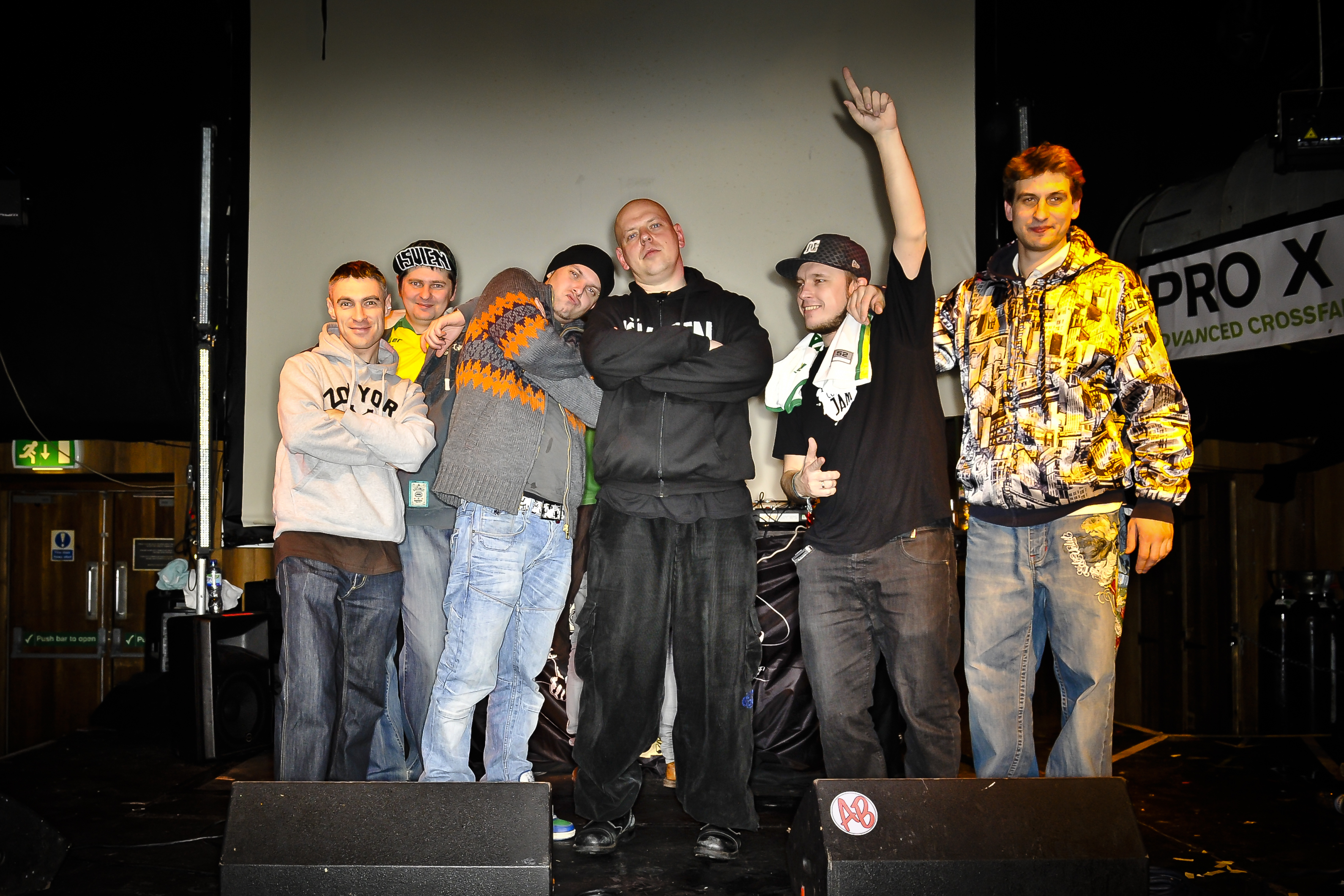
- G&G Sindikatas in London, 2011

Background information
- Origin: Vilnius, Lithuania
- Genres: hip hop, rap
- Years active: 1996-present
- Labels: G&G Sindikatas
- Members: Svaras; Kastetas; Donciavas; DJ Mamania
- Past members: Giga, Pushaz
- Website: Official webpage

G&G Sindikatas is a Lithuanian hip hop/rap band, formed in 1996 by two members – Gabrielius Liaudanskas known as Svaras and Giga. By the year 1998 the duo disbanded leaving one member Svaras in search of beats and studio for recording new tracks. After finding an alternative music compilation released by studio Porno Sound, Svaras contacted Kastytis Sarnickas (Kastetas) and Donatas Juršėnas (Donciavas), two studio owners who helped him record a debut album "Tavo sielos vagiz". Record sessions were joined by DJ Mamania. After the release of the first album Svaras invited Kastetas, Donciavas and DJ Mamania officially join the band. All four are known as the core members of the band to this day.

== Discography ==
=== Studio albums ===
Year	Album
1999	Tavo sielos vagiz
2001	Gatvės lyga
2002	Betono sakmės
2004	Alchemija
2008	Išvien
2014	Revoliucijos garso takelis
2017	Unplugged
2018	99
2022	Duona Kasdieninė / Skeletai Spintoje

=== Singles ===
- Betono džiunglėse (2002)
- Muzika, kuri saugo (2004)
- Degantis sniegas (2006)
- Tiems, kas rašo (2007)
- Žaibo rykštė (2011)
- Tiems kurie nieko nebijo (2017)
- Didžiojo piršto teorija (2025)
- Repo pajėgos (2026)
