= Vaidas Baumila =

Lithuanian singer and actor

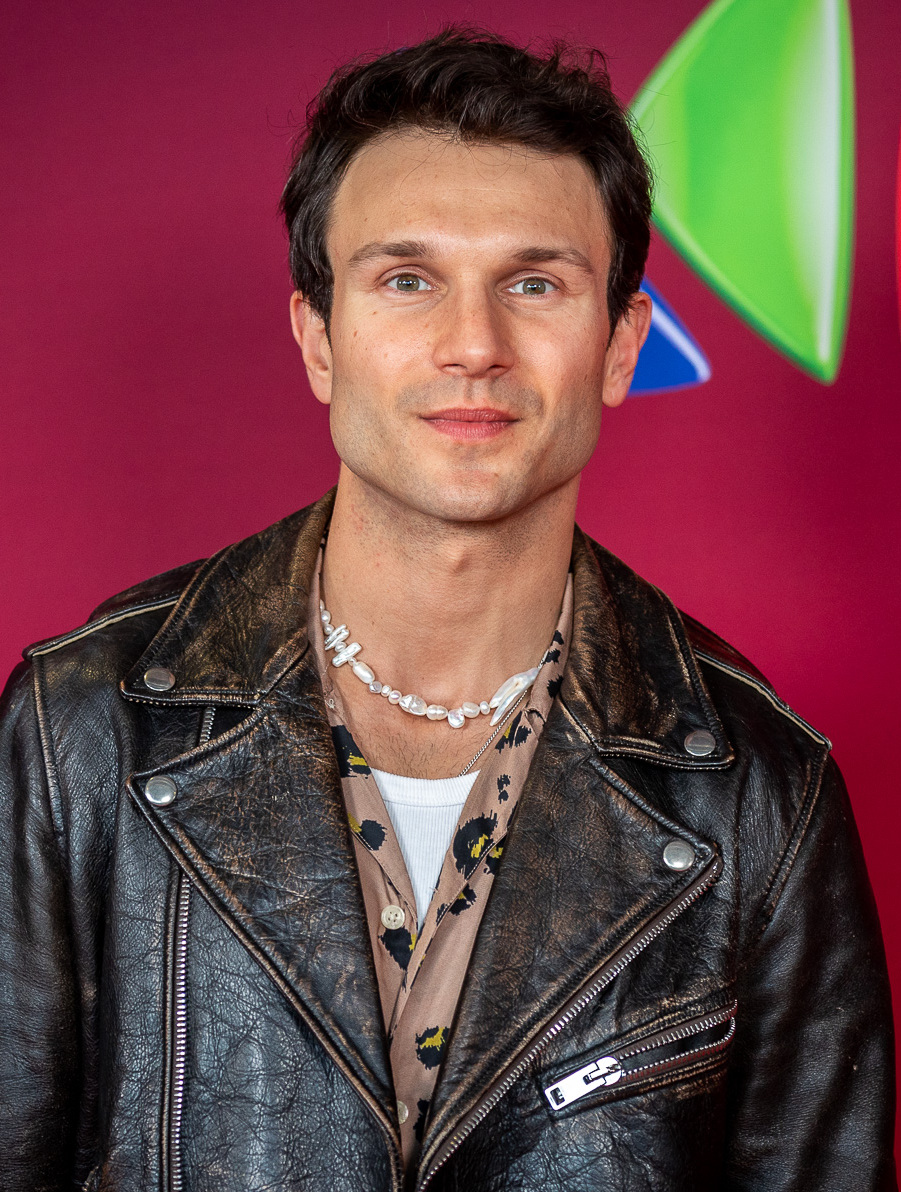
- Baumila in 2023

Background information
- Origin: Vilnius, Lithuania
- Genres: Pop, Pop Rock, R&B, Dance-Pop
- Occupation: Singer
- Instrument: Vocals

Vaidotas Baumila, known professionally as Vaidas Baumila, is a Lithuanian singer and actor. He represented Lithuania in the Eurovision Song Contest 2015 along with Monika Linkytė with the song "This Time".

He became known after finishing third in the TV3 music reality show Dangus. In 2014 he reached the final of Lithuanian Eurovision selection where he finished in third place.

== Discography ==
=== Studio albums ===
Title	Details	Peak chart positions
Title	Details	LTU
Ką tu mėgsti?	Released: 2006; Format: Digital download, CD	—
Išklausyk	Released: 2007; Format: Digital download, CD	—
Iš naujo	Released: 2015; Format: Digital download, CD	—
Milijonai	Released: April 16, 2020; Format: Digital download, CD	38
Apžavai	Released: November 30, 2022; Format: Digital download, CD	3
Vienodai žydi sodai	Released: May 8, 2025; Format: Digital download, CD	5

=== Mini Album (EP) ===
- Live Session (2014)

=== Singles ===
Title	Year	Peak chart positions		Album
Title	Year	LIT	AUT	Album
"Myliu"	2005	54	—	Non-album single
"This Time" (with Monika Linkytė)	2015	—	59	Iš naujo
"Ant Mašinos Stogo"	2015	—	—	Milijonai
"Panama"	2016	—	—	Milijonai
"Dviese" (with Moniqué)	2016	—	—	Milijonai
"Tai Buvai Tu"	2017	—	—	Milijonai
"Suknelė"	2018	—	—	Milijonai
"Šalta"	2018	—	—	Milijonai
"Būk Kantri"	2019	—	—	Milijonai
"Milijonai" (with JUSTÉ)	2019	13	—	Milijonai
"Galingi" (with Sofija)	2020	—	—	Milijonai
"Meilės sezonas"	2020	—	—	Non-album singles
"Mergaitė" (featuring Mark Les)	2020	—	—	Non-album singles
"Laikas Keistis"	2021	—	—	Non-album singles
"Kunigunda"	2021	1	—	Apžavai
"Demonai" (with Omerta)	2021	—	—	Non-album single
"Tavo veidas"	2022	68	—	Apžavai
"Apžavai"	2022	3	—	Apžavai
"Įsimylėjau" (with Paulina Paukštaitytė)	2022	—	—	Non-album single
"Apžavai"	2022	—	—	Apžavai
"Žaižaruoja"	2022	—	—	Apžavai
"Besarmatė"	2024	55	—	Non-album single
"Gegužis" (with Rokas Yan and Monika Liu)	2024	2	—	Širdis
"Gėlė"	2024	30	—	Vienodai žydi sodai
"Gniaužiu" (with Rūta Loop)	2024	—	—	Non-album single
"Marozika"	2025	4	—	Vienodai žydi sodai
"Vienodai žydi sodai"	2025	— (Note: "Vienodai žydi sodai" did not enter the AGATA Singlų Top 100, but peaked at No. 72 on the TopHit Lithuanian Airplay chart.)	—	Vienodai žydi sodai

=== Music Videos ===
Year	Title	Director
2007	"Music is my soul"	
2014	"Dying" (Acoustic)	Andrey Motorichev
2014	"Free Love"	
2014	"Neverta"	Algina Navickaitė
2014	"Tik žmogus"	
2014	"Kol meile tikėsim" (with Girmantė Vaitkutė)	
2015	"This Time" (with Monika Linkytė)	
2015	"Ką sugebame geriausiai"	
2015	"Nauja diena"	Vytautas Rumšas
2015	"Ant mašinos stogo"	
2016	"Panama"	Vytautas Rumšas
2016	"Dviese" (with Moniqué)	Vytautas Rumšas
2016	"Dviese" (Acoustic) (with Moniqué)	Vytautas Rumšas
2017	"Tai buvai Tu"	Normantas Ulevičius
2018	"Suknelė"	Normantas Ulevičius
2018	"Suknelė (acoustic)"	
2018	"Šalta"	Normantas Ulevičius
2019	"Būk Kantri"	Normantas Ulevičius
2019	"Milijonai" (with JUSTÉ)	Normantas Ulevičius
2019	"Galingi" (with Sofija)	
2020	"Meilės sezonas"	Normantas Ulevičius

== Filmography ==
Year	Film	Role	Notes
2014	Valentinas už 2rų	Himself	

== Awards and nominations ==
Year	Award	Category	Work	Result
2015	M.A.M.A Awards	Best Male Act	—	Won
2015	M.A.M.A Awards	Best Pop Act	—	Nominated
2015	M.A.M.A Awards	Best Song	"This Time" (with Monika Linkytė)	Nominated
2015	M.A.M.A Awards	Best Music Video	"Ant mašinos stogo"	Nominated
2019	M.A.M.A Awards	Music Video Of The Year	"Milijonai" (with JUSTÉ)	Nominated

== Notes ==
Awards and achievements
Preceded by Vilija with "Attention"	Lithuania in the Eurovision Song Contest; 2015 (with Monika Linkytė)	Succeeded by Donny Montell with "I've Been Waiting for This Night"
