= Sel (group) =

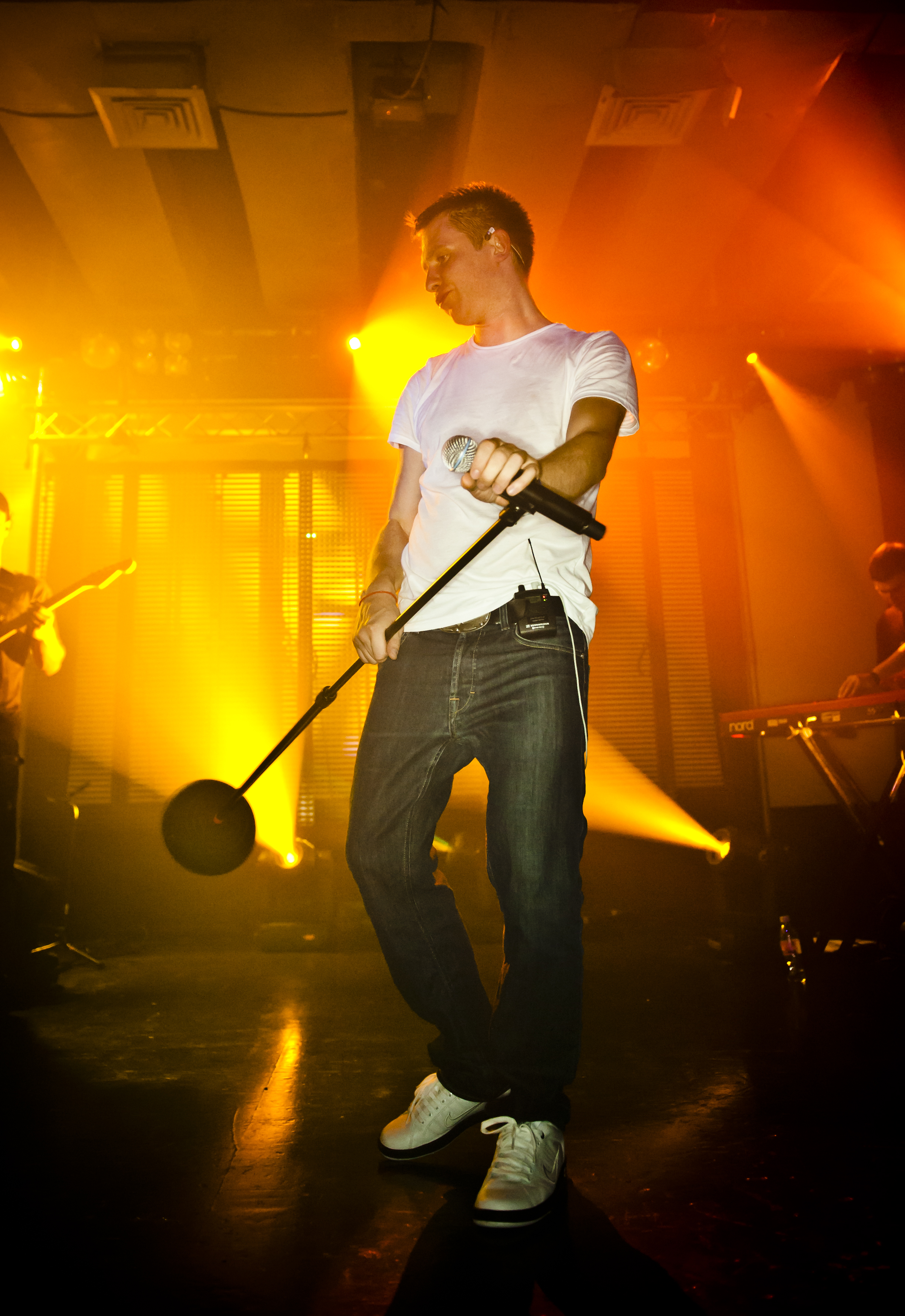
Egidijus Dragūnas in London in 2011

Sel is a Lithuanian dance music group.

The history of the group began on November 10, 1992, when its founder and leader Egidijus Dragūnas decided to call Andrius Mamontovas, who was hosting a show on the radio station M-1 at the time, and asked him to help create a rap group.

E. Dragūnas did not go unnoticed, and Andrius' brother Justas Mamontovas, who at that time produced the popular hip-hop group Pompa, soon began working with him and several of his friends. The name of the group is made up of the first letters of its members' names (Sieras, Egis, Laimis). The only permanent member in the group is its leader Egidijus Dragūnas. Starting with the first album "Kaip ir tu", E. Dragūnas worked with new people who influenced Sel's music in one way or another.

During its existence, SEL has released 10 albums, 6 singles, 2 best-of collections and 1 documentary DVD. The album "Aš kaip žasis" was certified platinum in Lithuania.

On December 5, 2015, SEL held its most expensive concert, costing 400 thousand euros, and a new attendance record was set at the Kaunas "Žalgiris" arena - the performance was watched by 20,517 spectators

In 2022, after E. Dragūnas' controversial statements about the Russian invasion of Ukraine, all musicians left the group (Kasparas Meginis, Julius Valancauskas, Jonas Butvydas, Viktoras Woop, Mindaugas Balčiūnas, Romas Rainys, Silvija Pankūnaitė-Micutė)

In August 2023, the band SEL became the first band to perform at the renovated Darius and Girėnas Stadium. The concert was watched by 35,600 spectators.

The name of the band is an acronym for three of its former and present members: Sieras, Egis, and Laimis.

== Links ==
- Official SEL fans page in Facebook.com
