= Ieva Narkutė =

Lithuanian singer-songwriter

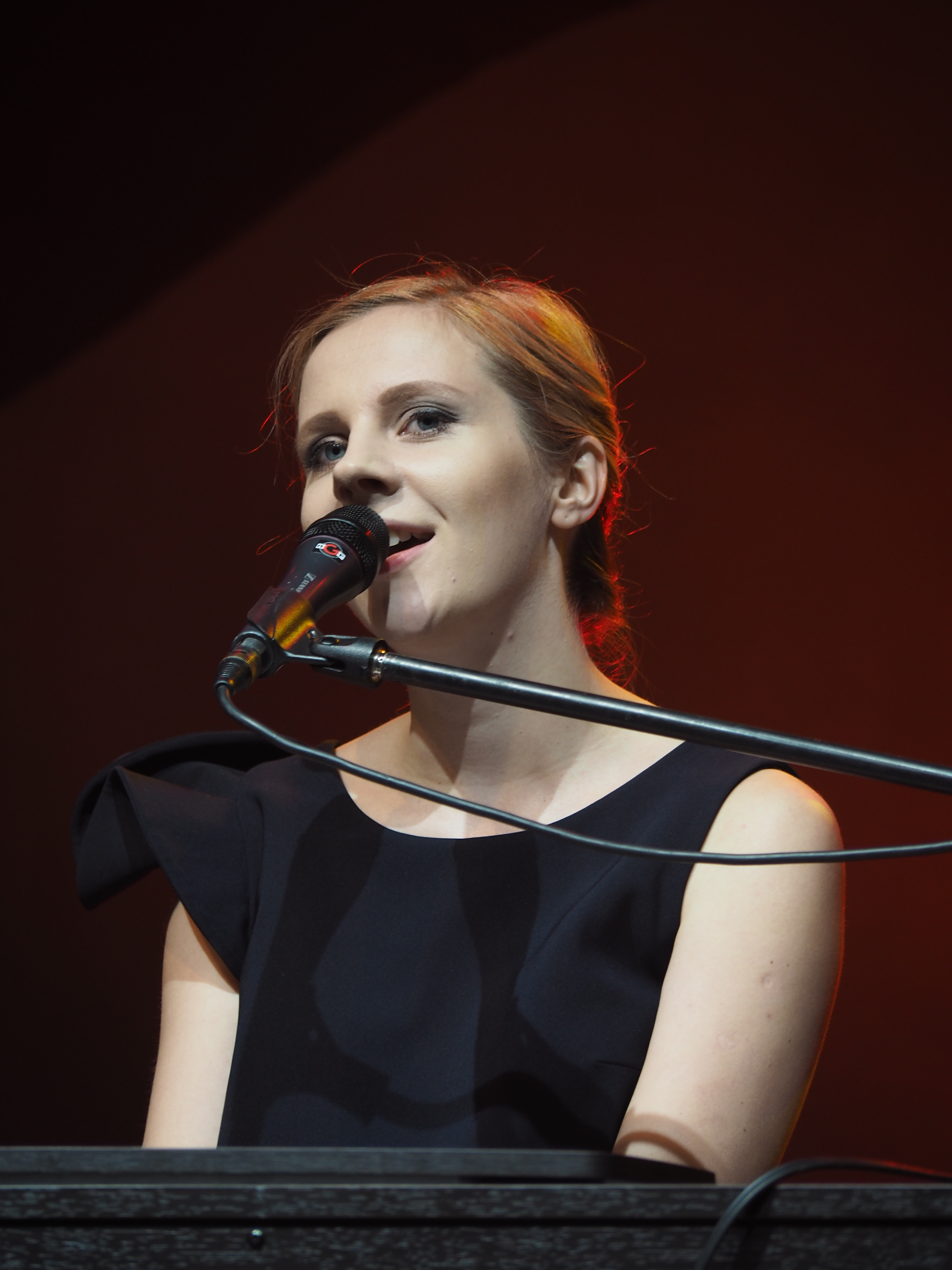
Narkutė in 2016

Ieva Narkutė–Šeduikienė (born 1987 in Kaunas), also known as Jieva, is a Lithuanian singer-songwriter.

She grew up in Šiauliai and her parents are musicians. She studied psychology and her song "Raudoni vakarai" was an important hit. In 2015, she married Mindaugas Šeduikis, a military man, at the Church of the Saviour in Vilnius. After the wedding, she chose a double surname - Ieva Narkute-Šeduikiene.

== Prizes ==
- 2007 – Award Saulius Mykolaitis;
- 2011 – Musical Awards T.Ė.T.Ė., best singer

== Discography ==
- Vienas (2013)
- Švelnesnis žvėris (2014)
- Ieva Narkutė sutinka Lietuvos valstybinį simfoninį orkestrą (2016)
- Kai muzika baigias (2018)

== See also ==
- Sung poetry
