= Leon Somov & Jazzu =

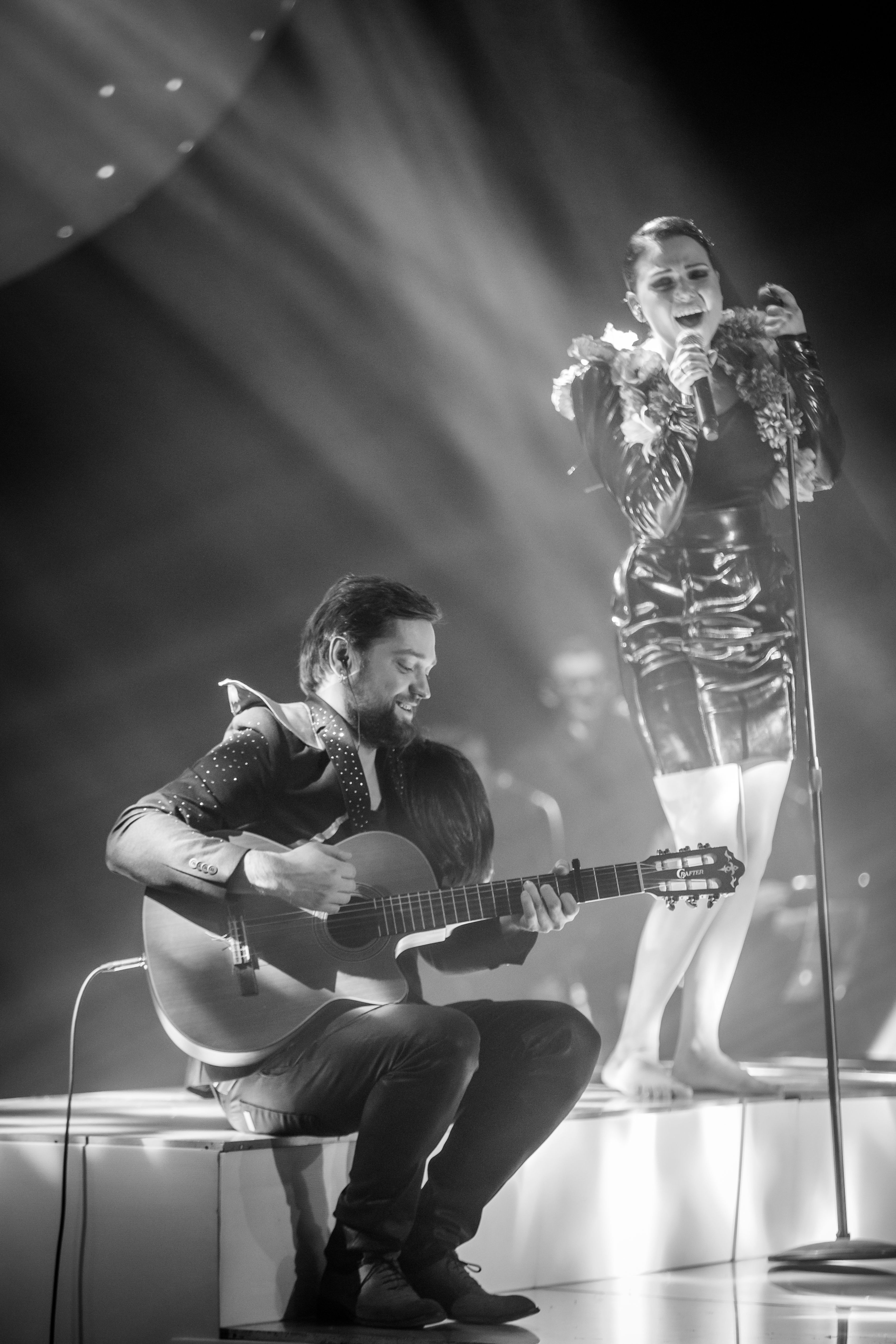
- Leon Somov and Jazzu performing in Vilnius, 2013

Background information
- Origin: Lithuania
- Genres: Electronic; experimental
- Years active: 2005–2018
- Members: Leonas Somovas; Justė Arlauskaitė

Leon Somov & Jazzu was a Lithuanian electronic music group, composed of Leonas Somovas, also known as Leon Somov, and Justė Arlauskaitė, also known as Jazzu.

== Band ==
In 2008 Leon Somov & Jazzu started to perform with a live band consisting of 5 musicians: drums, bass guitar, acoustic guitar, keyboard, laptop and fX, vocals. The group toured in Lithuania, the UK, Germany, Belgium, Denmark, the Netherlands, and Ireland. Their biggest hits are ‘Score’, ‘Phantoms of the Lake’, ‘Song about love, ‘You don’t know my name’ and new tracks – ‘Pretender’, ‘You and me’, ‘Lower than the Ground’.

From their debut in 2005, vocalist Jazzu and producer Leon Somov perform in full-band live shows consisting of sophisticated IDM clicks, elegant synthetic melodies and more experimental sounds, gently waving atmosphere, meaningful lyrics all spiced up by warm and lighter-than-air Jazzu voice.

On 2 December 2017, the duet reported that they would split in 2018.

== Biography ==
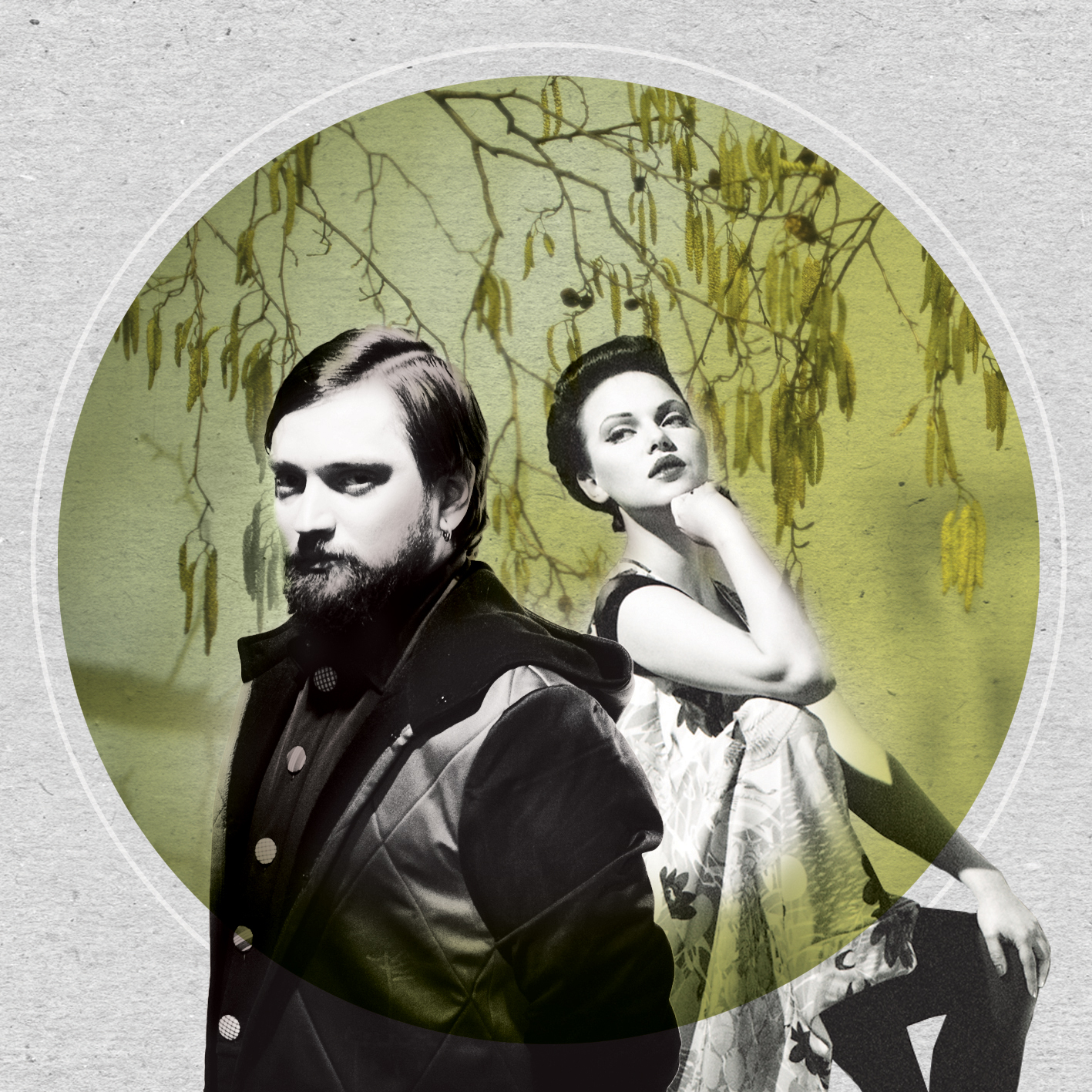
Leon Somov & Jazzu

Leon Somov (Leonas Somovas) has been creating music for more than 10 years. He is an acknowledged sound engineer, producer and electronic music composer. Leon's musical career began in a metal band. Later he became a producer of such Lithuanian artists like Jurga Šeduikytė, Petras Geniušas, and Jazzu. He also works with contemporary art projects and creates music for theatre plays. Leonas Somovas has collaborated with the renowned theatre director Eimuntas Nekrošius.

Jazzu (Justė Arlauskaitė) started singing jazz at the age of 13. As a soloist, she performed with big-bands and in various jazz projects in Lithuania and abroad. At 15 she became a singer of the Lithuanian electronic band Pieno Lazeriai (aka 'Milky Lasers'). After graduating from music school and Juozas Tallat Kelpša Conservatory, she moved to London to study vocal singing at Thames Valley University. In 2005 Jazzu met producer Leon Somov and got involved into electronic music. Now Jazzu is working on her solo album with the Swedish Music Agency Mr. Radar.

== Discography ==
Album	Year
Offline	2007
Offline Remixed	2008
Updated	2009
Score	2010
Lees and Seas	2013
Istorijos	2015
Moments	2016

== Awards and nomination ==
In 2009, Leon Somov & Jazzu were granted Best Baltic Act award at 2009 MTV Europe Music Awards. 2011 they won 'Best Electronic Music Band' award at Lithuanian music association awards M.A.M.A. In 2011 and 2012 Jazzu won ‘Best Female Singer of the Year’ and in 2012 Leon Somov became ‘Producer of the Year’. In 2013 ‘Leon Somov & Jazzu’ won 3 awards – ‘Best Electronic Music Band’, ‘Album of the Year’ and ‘Band of the Year’ at Lithuanian music association awards (M.A.M.A.)

Year	Award	Category	Nominee/work	Result
2009	EMA	Best Baltic Act	Leon Somov & Jazzu	Won
2011	M.A.M.A.	Best Electronic Music Band	Leon Somov & Jazzu	Won
2011	M.A.M.A.	Best Female Act	Jazzu	Won
2012	M.A.M.A.	Best Female Act	Jazzu	Won
2012	M.A.M.A.	Best Producer	Leon Somov	Won
2013	M.A.M.A.	Best Live Act	Leon Somov & Jazzu	Won
2013	M.A.M.A.	Best Electronic Act	Leon Somov & Jazzu	Won
2013	M.A.M.A.	Best Band	Leon Somov & Jazzu	Won
2013	M.A.M.A.	Best Album	"Lees and seas"	Won
2014	M.A.M.A.	Best Band	Leon Somov & Jazzu	Won
2015	M.A.M.A.	Best Pop Act	Leon Somov & Jazzu	Won
2015	M.A.M.A.	Best Band	Leon Somov & Jazzu	Won
2015	M.A.M.A.	Best Album	"Istorijos"	Nominated
2015	M.A.M.A.	Best Song	"Po mano oda"	Nominated
2015	M.A.M.A.	LATGA Most Popular Composer	Leon Somov	Won
2016	M.A.M.A.	Best Band	Leon Somov & Jazzu	Won
2016	M.A.M.A.	Best Live Act	Leon Somov & Jazzu	Won
2016	M.A.M.A.	Best Song	"Gaila"	Nominated
