= Jurga Šeduikytė =

Jurga
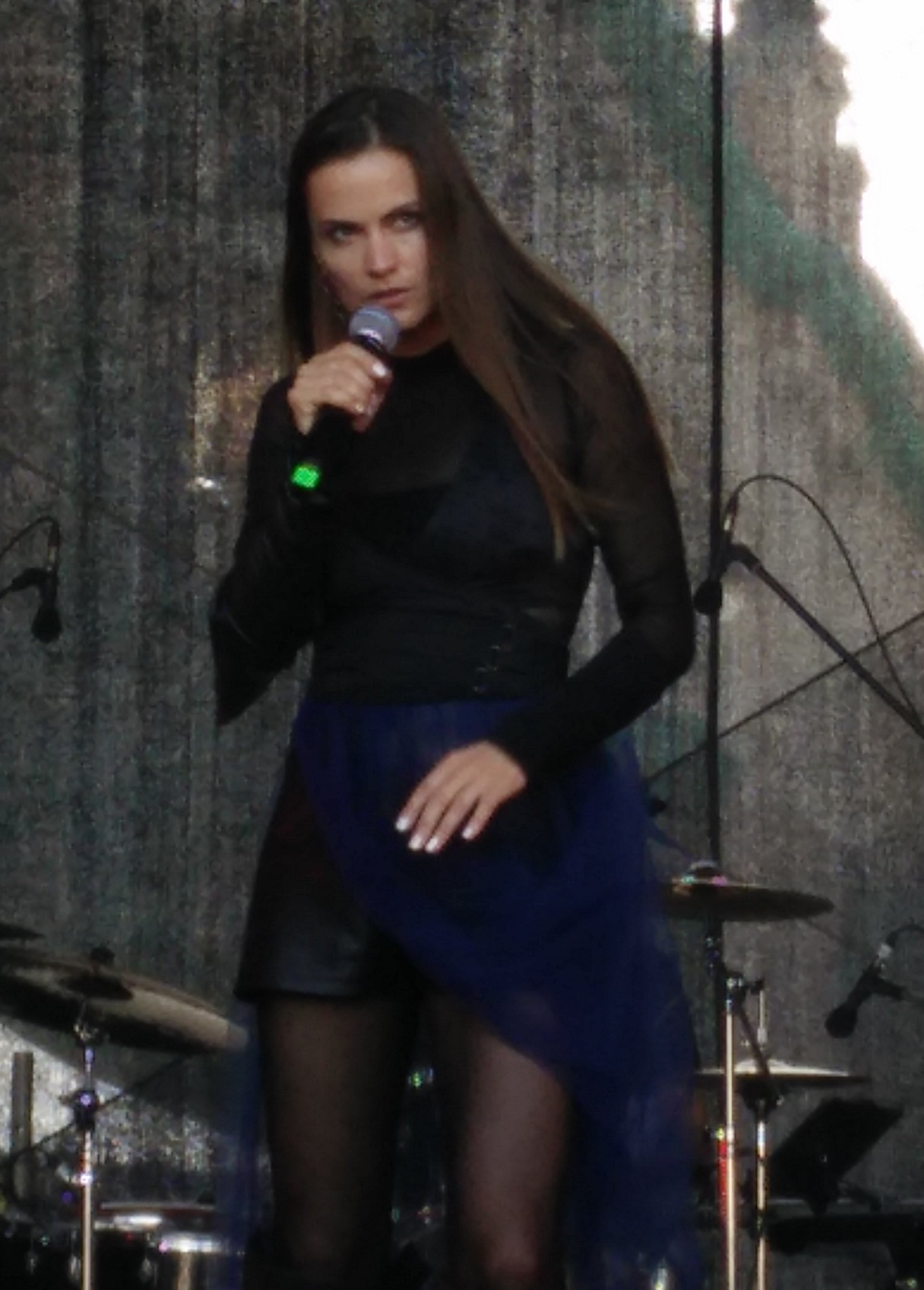
- Jurga in August 2019

Background information
- Born: Jurga Šeduikytė; February 10, 1980 (age 46); Klaipėda, Lithuania
- Genres: Pop, art rock
- Years active: 2005 – present
- Label: M.P.3

Jurga Šeduikytė (born February 11, 1980, Klaipėda, Lithuania), known by her stage names Jurga and formerly Dingau, is a Lithuanian singer and songwriter.

== Biography ==
Jurga was born into a family of musicians in Telšiai, where she spent her first childhood years. In her second school year she moved to Palanga, where she took piano lessons at the local music school and graduated from high school. She studied journalism at Vilnius University.

In 2002, she participated in the TV singer contest Fizz Superstar. The same year she began to perform under the pseudonym Dingau with girl-rock band Muscat. In 2004 she played in the musicals Fire Hunt with Beaters (Ugnies medžioklė su varovais) and Tadas Blinda.

In 2005, she began her solo career under the stage name Jurga. Her debut album, Aukso Pieva (Meadow of Gold), produced by Andrius Mamontovas, was released on September 16, 2005. The first single, Nebijok (Don't Be Afraid) charted at number one for eight weeks and became the biggest hit single in Lithuania of 2005.

The debut album includes twelve songs in Lithuanian and English, almost all of them written by Jurga herself. Shortly after this, Jurga received many Lithuanian awards.

Jurga's second album, Instrukcija (Instruction) was released on April 19, 2007. It includes thirteen tracks written by Jurga in Lithuania and New Zealand. The album release was accompanied by a tour across Lithuania and a visit to Anaberg Castle, Friesdorf district of Bonn, Germany.

In July 2007, her song, "5th Season", won the Grand Prix of the Baltic Song Festival in Karlshamn, Sweden. A few months later, on November 1, Jurga won the MTV European Music Award for Best Baltic Act. Jurga was the first Lithuanian to win an MTV award.

On August 28, 2008, Jurga's son Adas was born. On August 26, 2009, she married her boyfriend and father of her son, Vidas Bareikis, Lithuanian musician. The couple separated in 2019, after 10 years of marriage.

== Discography ==
=== Albums ===
- Aukso pieva (2005)
1. "Aukso pieva"
2. "Aš esu tiktai jei tu esi" - l. Andrius Mamontovas
3. "Nebijok"
4. "Trouble"
5. "Pilnatis" - l. Andrius Mamontovas
6. "Laisvė" - m. Eurika Masytė, l. Justinas Marcinkevičius
7. "Kai pamirši tu mane" - m., l. Andrius Mamontovas
8. "The Longest Day"
9. "Gėlių takai"
10. "Galbūt"
11. "Saulė vandeny"
12. "Vakar lijo čia"
- Instrukcija (2007)
1. "Instrukcija"
2. "Koralų pasaka"
3. "Angelai"
4. "Smėlio žmonės"
5. "Spiderwoman: Rising"
6. "Juodos gulbės"
7. "5th Season"
8. "Benamio daina"
9. "Renkuosi Žemę"
10. "Ryte"
11. "Per silpna"
12. "Šerlokas Holmsas"
13. "Prie žalio vandens"
- '''+37° (Goal of Science)''' (2009)
1. "+37°"
2. "Rykliai ir vilkolakiai"
3. "Kišeniniai namai"
4. "Tyliai"
5. "Running"
6. "Miego vagys"
7. "Living Like You Said"
8. "Goal Of Science"
9. "Melsvai žalia"
10. "Drugys"
11. "The Night Is Waiting"
12. "Soft Explosion"
- Prie Žalio Vandens (2011)
- Metronomes (2011)
1. "100 Clowns"
2. "Мне Уже Не Важно"
3. Žvėriukai
4. Hey, Sisters
5. Tūla
6. Nuskrido
7. Kosmosas
8. Ne Poetas
9. Ilgu
10. No One Can Move
11. Я Слежу За Тобой
12. Final
- Breaking The Line (2013)
1. Jūra Vandenynas
2. Walking On The Pillows
3. Hey, Joe
4. Laiko Nėra
5. Sky Is Closer Than You
6. Om (Interlude)
7. Om
8. Dangau
9. So Blue
10. Breaking The Line
11. The End
- Giliai Vandeny (2015)
1. Tavo Krante
2. Juoduoju Baltuoju
3. Giliai Vandeny
4. Meilė, Muzika Ir Laikas
5. Sapnas
6. Ten, Kur Tu
7. Pauštelis
8. Kvepia Tavim Dangus
9. Sapnų Mergina
10. Liūlia Liūlia
11. Ašara
12. If
13. Master And Tatyana
- Not Perfect (2017)
1. Not Perfect
2. Bro
3. King Of My Time
4. Life Is A Dance For One
5. If
6. No Pain No Gain
7. Dreaming
8. Reikalingi
9. Would You Take Care Of Me
10. Upių Slėniuose

== Awards ==
- RadioCentras Awards: Female Artist of The Year 2008
- MTV Europe Music Awards: Best Baltic Act, 2007
- Baltic Song festival Grand Prix (Karlshamn, Sweden): Jurga 5th season, 2007
- Radiocentras Award 2007: Female Artist of The Year
- Alfa Award: Album of The Year - Instrukcija, 2007
- Sugihara Foundation Diplomats For Life Award: Tolerance Award of The Year 2007
- Moteris Award: Woman of The Year 2007
- Pravda 2007 Special Award: Special Award for Representing The Truth
- Lithuanian www championship: Best personal site - www.jurgamusic.com
- Baltic Optical Disc award: For platinum album Aukso pieva, 2006
- Bravo 2005 Awards: Debut of The Year, Album of The Year - Aukso Pieva 2005, Female Artist of The Year
- Radiocentras Awards 2005: Female Artist of The Year, Song of The Year - Nebijok, 2005, Album of The Year - Aukso Pieva, 2005
- JP Music Awards 2005: Female Artist of The Year, Song of The Year - Nebijok, 2005, Voice of Nation Award
- Ore Awards 2005: Song of The Year - Nebijok, 2005, Debut of The Year
- Pravda Newcomer Awards 2005: Lithuanian Song of The Year - Nebijok, 2005, Newcomer of The Year
- Lithuanian Radio Award: The Most Popular Song of The Year - Nebijok, 2005
