= Fusedmarc =

Lithuanian band

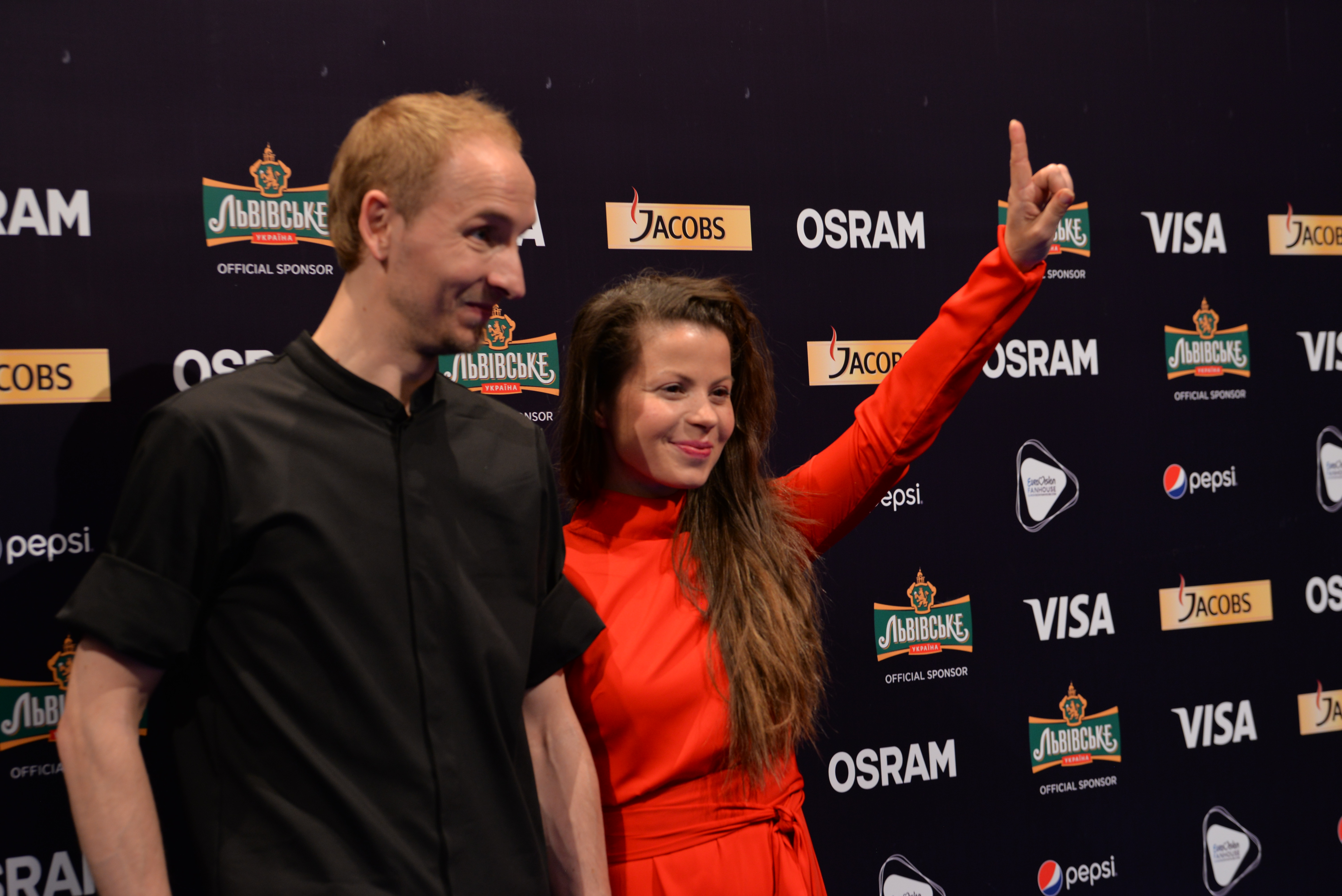
- Fusedmarc in Kyiv

Background information
- Origin: Vilnius, Lithuania
- Genres: Electronic
- Years active: 2004–present
- Labels: Sutemos, Universal Music
- Members: Viktorija Ivanovskaja; Denis Zujev; Stasys Žak

Fusedmarc is a Lithuanian electronic band from Vilnius. The band consists of lead vocalist Viktorija Ivanovskaja, multi-instrumentalist Denis Zujev, and visual designer Stasys Žak. They represented Lithuania in the Eurovision Song Contest 2017 with the song "Rain of Revolution", but failed to qualify to the final. They were placed 17th, which was second to last, in the second semifinal, giving Lithuania its second-worst result in the competition.

== Members ==
- Viktorija Ivanovskaja (CIILIIA) – lead vocals, melodist, composer, programming
- Denisas Zujevas (DJ VAKX) – guitar, bass, drums, composer, programming, songwriting

== Discography ==
=== EPs ===
Title	Year
Contraction	2005

=== Singles ===
Title	Year	Album
"Rain of Revolution"	2017	Non-album single

Awards and achievements
Preceded by Donny Montell with "I've Been Waiting for This Night"	Lithuania in the Eurovision Song Contest; 2017	Succeeded by Ieva Zasimauskaitė with "When We're Old"
