= Vilija Matačiūnaitė =

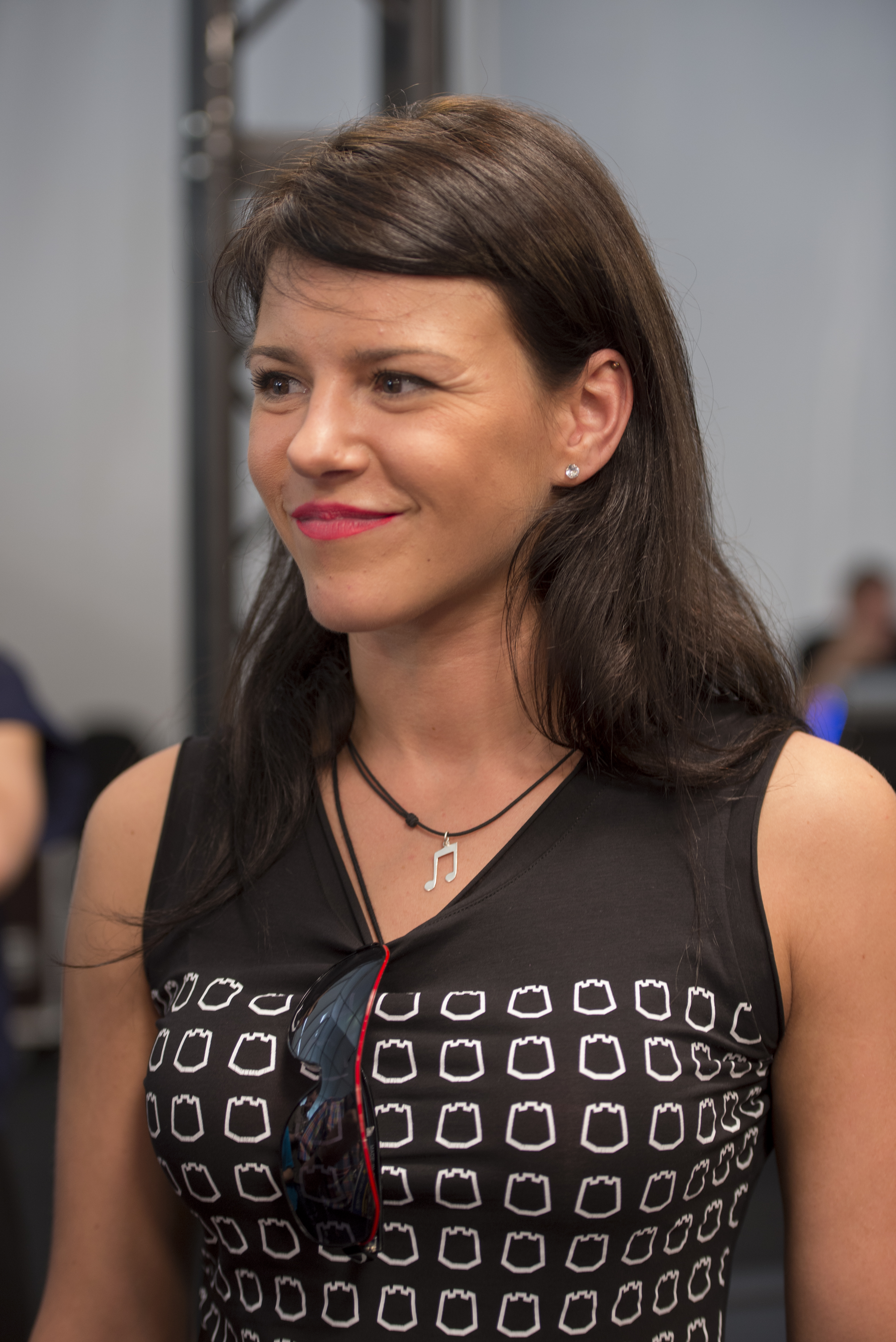
- Vilija Matačiūnaitė in 2014

Background information
- Born: 24 June 1986 (age 40); Vilnius, Lithuania
- Genres: Pop punk (early); pop; pop-rock; electropop
- Occupations: Singer-songwriter; actress
- Instrument: Vocals
- Years active: 2002–present
- Website: vilija.lt

Vilija Matačiūnaitė (born 24 June 1986) is a Lithuanian singer, actress, and songwriter. She represented Lithuania in the 59th annual Eurovision Song Contest 2014 in Copenhagen, Denmark, with her song "Attention".

== Career ==
Matačiūnaitė began her professional career in 2005, when she reached the finals of the Lithuanian National Eurovision preselection and finished 7th. In 2005, she achieved wide recognition by participating in the first season of a successful local LNK television music competition franchise Kelias į žvaigždes, where she became the runner-up. In 2010, she finished 2nd on a dance show Kviečiu Šokti, and she was third in the international singing competition Sea songs in Ukraine. In 2011, she was the runner-up in the international singing competition Golden voices in Moldova. She was crowned the winner of the UK music competition Melange Factor in 2012. In 2013, she won the local LRT television music competition for professional voices Auksinis balsas. She also hosted music TV show Romeo ir Džiuljeta. In 2014, she won the Lithuanian Eurovision national selection with her winning song "Attention".

=== Eurovision 2014 ===
Matačiūnaitė represented Lithuania in the Eurovision Song Contest 2014, singing the song "Attention", which she wrote herself. She failed to make it past the second semi final, achieving 11th place.

She received the Barbara Dex Award for the worst dressed artist in the 2014.

=== Eurovision 2017 ===
In 2017, Matačiūnaitė participated in the national final for the Eurovision Song Contest with the song "I See the Lights" but did not go through the first stage of the selection.

=== Eurovision 2021 and 2022 ===
Under the artist name Sunday Afternoon, Matačiūnaitė entered Pabandom iš naujo! 2021 in an attempt to represent Lithuania in the Eurovision Song Contest 2021 with the song "Open". She failed to qualify from the semi-finals. She returned to Pabandom iš naujo! in 2022 to try for a fourth time to represent Lithuania in the Eurovision Song Contest 2022 with the song "101", where she finished in sixth place in the second semi-final of the competition.

=== Eurovision 2024 ===
On 19 December 2023, Matačiūnaitė was announced among the competing artists of Eurovizija.LT, the Lithuanian national final for the Eurovision Song Contest 2024, with the song "Save Me".

== Discography ==
=== Albums ===
Title	Details
Mylėk	Released: 27 October 2006; Label: Hitas; Formats: digital download, CD
Attention!	Released: 2014; Label: Hitas; Formats: digital download, CD

=== Singles ===
Title	Year	Album
"Spjaudau Sau Ir Gaudau"	2005	Mylėk
"Kvailys"	2005	Mylėk
"Mylėk"	2005	Mylėk
"Alkana Širdis"	2006	Mylėk
"Žiogai"	2006	Mylėk

== Filmography ==
Year	Film	Role	Notes
2010	Mano mylimas prieše (TV series)	Miglė	Main role. Also a performer of the theme song

Awards and achievements
Preceded by Andrius Pojavis with "Something"	Lithuania in the Eurovision Song Contest; 2014	Succeeded by Monika Linkytė & Vaidas Baumila with "This Time"
Preceded by (Serbia) Moje 3	Barbara Dex Award Winner; 2014	Succeeded by (Netherlands) Trijntje Oosterhuis
