= Mylek =

Mylek or similar terms may refer to:

- Mylėk, 2006 album by Lithuanian singer Vilija Matačiūnaitė
- MyLek (film), 2024 Marathi-language drama film
