= Donny Montell =

Lithuanian singer-songwriter (born 1987)

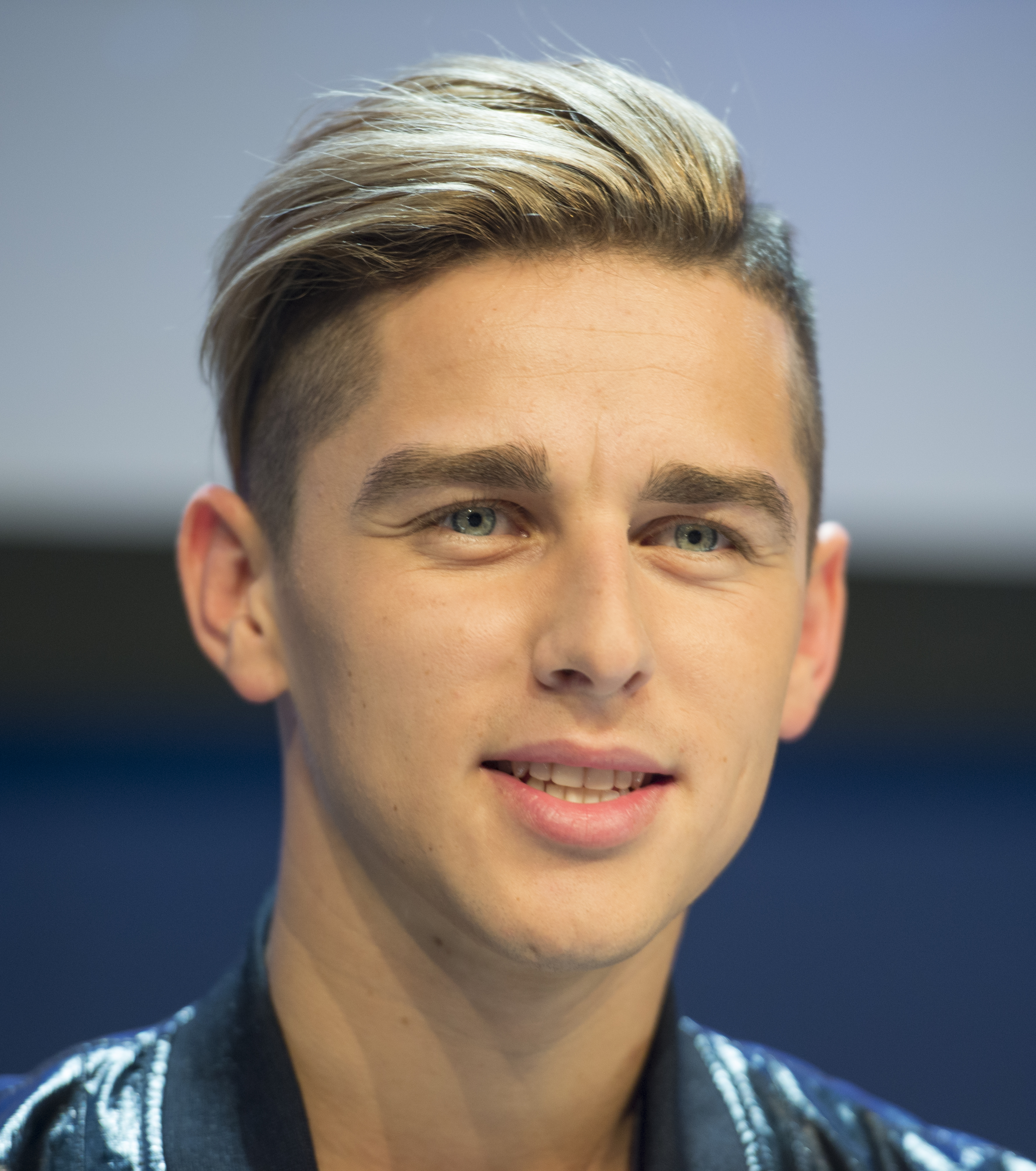

Background information
- Also known as: Donny Montell
- Born: Donatas Montvydas; 22 October 1987 (age 38); Vilnius, then part of Lithuanian SSR, Soviet Union
- Origin: Lithuania
- Genres: Pop, R&B, Soul, Funk, Dance-Pop
- Occupation: Singer-songwriter
- Instruments: Vocals, piano
- Years active: 2008–present

Donatas Montvydas (born 22 October 1987), also known by his stage name Donny Montell, is a Lithuanian singer-songwriter who represented Lithuania at the Eurovision Song Contest 2012, held in Baku, Azerbaijan. He represented Lithuania for a second time in 2016, when he represented his country in Stockholm, Sweden.

== Early life ==
Donatas Montvydas was born on 22 October 1987 in Vilnius. His mother was a gymnast and his father, Algirdas Montvydas, was a drummer of the hard rock group Plackartas. Montvydas' older sister is a professional dancer. His interest in music began at a young age. He started performing publicly at age six when his vocal teacher let him participate in the contest for young singers Dainų dainelė ("The song of the Songs"), singing "Aš kiškelis mažas" and he became a laureate. In 2008, he won his first big prize when becoming the Grand Prix winner of the International Festival of Arts Slavianski Bazaar in Vitebsk, Belarus.

== Musical influences ==
As a child, Montvydas was highly influenced by artists such as Michael Jackson and rock band Queen, and would often impersonate these artists from a young age. He also admires Freddie Mercury for his personality. Montvydas also stated that his father is by far his biggest inspiration.

== Personal life ==
He was married to dancer Veronika Brasaitė, with whom he has a daughter Adelė (born in 2013) and a son Kajus (born in 2017). They divorced in 2024. When confirming their divorce in an Instagram post, Montvydas said that he supports the LGBT community, but has always been sure of his own sexuality, having only been attracted to women.

== Eurovision Song Contest ==
Year	National Final	Song	Results	
Year	National Final	Song	Lithuanian National Final	Eurovision Song Contest
2009	Lietuvos Dainų Daina	"From The Distance" "Dainų daina" (with Rosita Čivilytė)	2nd 11–20th	Did not participate
2010	Eurovizija 2010	"Running Fast"	DSQ	Did not participate
2011	Eurovizija 2011	"Let Me" "Best Friends" (with Sasha Son)	5th 10th	Did not participate
2012	Eurovizija atranka Lietuvoje	"Love Is Blind"	Won	14th
2016	"Eurovizijos" dainų konkurso nacionalinė atranka	"I've Been Waiting for This Night"	Won	9th

== Filmography ==
=== Television ===
Year	Title	Role	Notes
2010	Šok su manimi	Himself	Contestant; 1st place
2012	Eurovision Song Contest 2012	Himself	Contestant; 14th place
2013–21	Lietuvos balsas	Judge	Seasons 2–8
2016	Eurovision Song Contest 2016	Himself	Contestant; 9th place
2019–21	Lietuvos balsas. Vaikai	Judge	Season 1–3

== Discography ==
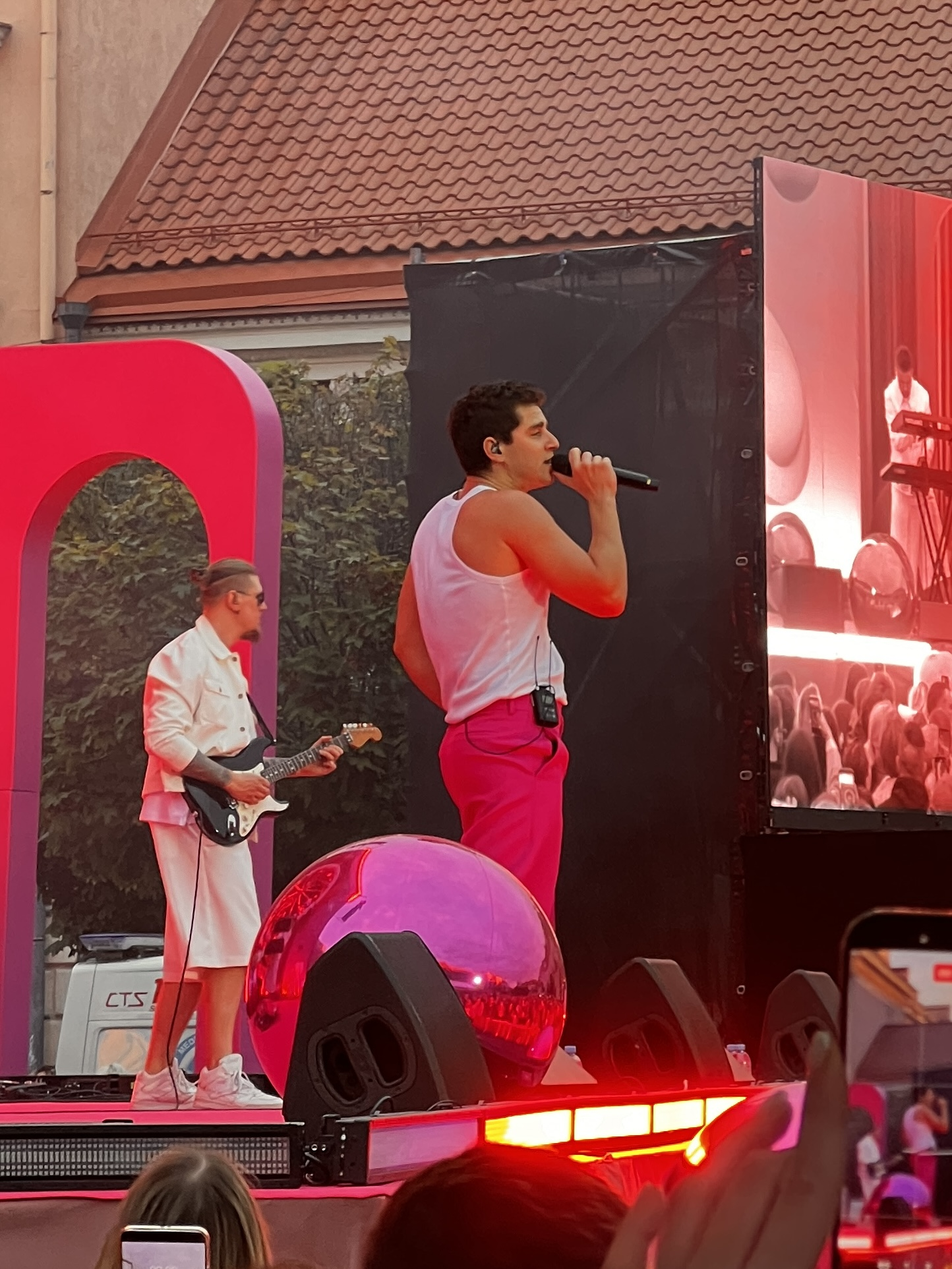
Donatas Montvydas in concert during the Vilnius Pink Soup Fest 2026.

Donny Montell in concert during Vilnius Days September 2026

=== Studio albums ===
Title	Details	Peak chart positions
Title	Details	LTU
Norim Dar	Released: 23 December 2013; Formats: Digital download, CD	—
#BLCK	Released: 26 March 2016; Formats: Digital download, CD	—
1987	Released: 4 September 2021; Formats: Digital download, CD, LP	16

=== EPs ===
Title	Details
Tik Tau Vienai	Released: 2012; Format: Digital download

=== Singles ===
Title	Year	LTU	SWE Heat.	Album
"Running Fast"	2010	—	—	Donny Montell
"Leisk Mylėt"	2010	—	—	Donny Montell
"Let Me"	2010	—	—	Donny Montell
"Mano Vasara"	2011	—	—	Donny Montell
"Yes or No"	2011	—	—	Donny Montell
"Love Is Blind"	2012	—	—	Donny Montell
"Norim Dar"	2012	—	—	Tik Tau Vienai and Norim Dar
"#BLCK" (featuring Echoes)	2015	25	—	#BLCK
"Viskas Bus Gerai"	2015	3	—	#BLCK
"Kas būsim rytoj"	2015	13	—	#BLCK
"Tai Mūsų Laikas"	2016	13	—	#BLCK
"Iš Proto Einu"	2016	36	—	#BLCK
"Don't Touch Me"	2016	7	—	#BLCK
"I've Been Waiting for This Night"	2016	1	4	#BLCK
"Fly"	2016	4	—	#BLCK
"Screw Me Up"	2017	2	—	Non-album singles
"Move Your Body"	2017	15	—	Non-album singles
"Nieko verta" (with SEL)	2017	3	—	Non-album singles
"Žiūrėk ką padarei"	2018	2	—	Non-album singles
"Ryto Saulė"	2019	7	—	Non-album singles
"Man Patinka"	2019	16	—	Non-album singles
"Another Lover" (with Jey Balmain)	2019	18	—	Non-album singles
"No Strings"	2020	—	—	Non-album singles
"Kol Vakaras Ilgas"	2020	39	—	1987
"Kai Nieko Kito Nelieka Man"	2020	91	—	1987
"17" (featuring Džordana Butkutė)	2020	21	—	1987
"Štai ir vėl"	2020	—	—	1987
"Atiduočiau Už Naktį Bet Ką"	2021	—	—	1987
"Baubas"	2021	—	—	1987
"Lūpos kaip medus"	2022	—	—	Non-album singles
"Jausmai"	2023	18	—	Non-album singles
"Ikaras"	2024	— (Note: "Ikaras" did not enter the AGATA Singlų Top 100, but peaked at No. 20 on the TopHit Lithuanian Airplay chart.)	—	Non-album singles
"Sudužusi širdis"	2024	— (Note: "Sudužusi širdis" did not enter the AGATA Singlų Top 100, but peaked at No. 2 on the TopHit Lithuanian Airplay chart.)	—	Non-album singles

== Notes ==
Awards and achievements
Preceded by Evelina Sašenko with "C'est ma vie"	Lithuania in the Eurovision Song Contest; 2012	Succeeded by Andrius Pojavis with "Something"
Preceded by Monika Linkytė & Vaidas Baumila with "This Time"	Lithuania in the Eurovision Song Contest; 2016	Succeeded by Fusedmarc with "Rain of Revolution"
