= Lithuania in the Eurovision Song Contest =

- Eurovision Song Contest
- Participating broadcaster: Lietuvos nacionalinis radijas ir televizija (LRT)

Participation summary
- Appearances: 26 (19 finals)
- First appearance: 1994
- Highest placement: 6th: 2006
- Participation history: 1994; 1995; 1996; 1997; 1998; 1999; 2000; 2001; 2002; 2003; 2004; 2005; 2006; 2007; 2008; 2009; 2010; 2011; 2012; 2013; 2014; 2015; 2016; 2017; 2018; 2019; ~~2020~~; 2021; 2022; 2023; 2024; 2025; 2026

External links
- LRT page
- Lithuania's page at Eurovision.com
- For the most recent participation see Lithuania in the Eurovision Song Contest 2026

Lithuania has been represented at the Eurovision Song Contest 26 times since its debut in 1994. The Lithuanian participating broadcaster in the contest is Lietuvos nacionalinis radijas ir televizija (LRT), which has been a member of the European Broadcasting Union since 1993.

The country achieved its best result in 2006, when "We Are the Winners" by LT United finished sixth. Its other top-ten results are a ninth-place finish with "I've Been Waiting for This Night" by Donny Montell in 2016 and an eighth-place finish with "Discoteque" by The Roop in 2021.

As of 2026, Lithuania is the only Baltic country that has not won the contest, following wins for Estonia in 2001 and Latvia in 2002. Since the introduction of semi-finals in 2004, Lithuania has qualified for the final 15 times.

== Participation ==
Lietuvos nacionalinis radijas ir televizija (LRT) has been a full member of the European Broadcasting Union (EBU) since 1 January 1993, making them eligible to participate in the Eurovision Song Contest since then. It has participated in the contest representing Lithuania since the 39th contest in 1994. LRT had previously considered to debut in the contest in 1993, however the planned entry failed to materialize.

== History ==
=== 1990s ===
Lithuania debuted in the contest in 1994, however, its entry, "Lopšinė mylimai" performed by Ovidijus Vyšniauskas, finished last and received no points. LRT withdrew after its debut and did not return until 1999. Following a poor result in 1999, Lithuania was relegated from participating in the 2000 contest.

=== 2000s ===
Lithuania returned in 2001 with "You Got Style" by Skamp, the first Lithuanian song to include English. They received 35 points, placing 13th. However, the following year, Aivaras could only manage to come second-to-last with 12 points.

Since the semi-finals were introduced, Lithuania again came last with Laura and the Lovers and "Little by Little". The following year, the Lithuanian broadcaster Lietuvos nacionalinis radijas ir televizija (LRT) sent LT United to the 2006 contest with the football chant-like song "We Are the Winners". They took Lithuania to the final for the first time since 2002, coming sixth in the final with 162 points, Lithuania's best placing as of 2026.

The following year, Lithuania automatically qualified for the final; however, 4Fun could not replicate LT United's success, coming 21st with only 28 points, 12 of which came from Ireland. In 2008, Jeronimas Milius failed to reach the final, coming 16th out of 19 competing nations in the second semi-final.

Lithuania initially threatened to boycott the 2009 contest "if Russia continues to showcase power and ignores international law." The statement was made in reaction to Russia's actions in the Russian invasion of Georgia in 2008. Culture Minister Jonas Jučas stated that it was too early to discuss the boycott since "spontaneous decisions might aggravate the efforts of diplomats" and thus make the situation worse. They did eventually participate in the 2009 contest, where they qualified from the semi-finals and received 23 points in the final, placing them 23rd.

=== 2010s ===
LRT announced in December 2009 that, due to a lack of necessary funds, Lithuania would formally withdraw from the 2010 Contest. However, in the event that the necessary funds of 300,000 litas (€90,000) were found, the broadcaster announced that they would attempt to continue the country's participation. Ultimately, private company TEO LT provided the necessary funding and Lithuania participated in Oslo.

In 2011, Lithuania was represented by Evelina Sašenko with the song "C'est ma vie". The song qualified from the first semi-final, placing 5th with 81 points. In the grand final, Lithuania finished in 19th place with 63 points.

In 2012, Lithuania qualified for the final with Donny Montell and his song "Love Is Blind", placing 3rd with 104 points. They eventually finished 14th in the Grand Final.

In 2013, Lithuania qualified for the final with "Something" by Andrius Pojavis, placing 9th in the first semi-final with 53 points. In the final, he finished in 22nd place with 17 points.

In 2014, Vilija didn't qualify for the final, finishing 11th out of 15 entrants in the second semi-final, scoring 36 points.

In 2015, Monika Linkytė and Vaidas Baumila represented Lithuania with the song "This Time". The duo qualified from the second semi-final, finishing 7th, and ultimately placed 18th in the grand final with 30 points.

In 2016, Donny Montell returned to the contest and achieved Lithuania's best result of the decade, finishing ninth with "I've Been Waiting for This Night".

In 2017, Lithuania was represented by Fusedmarc with the song "Rain of Revolution". The song failed to qualify for the grand final, finishing 17th in the second semi-final with 42 points.

In 2018, Ieva Zasimauskaitė achieved Lithuania's fifth top 15 result, finishing 12th with "When We're Old".

In 2019, Jurij Veklenko represented Lithuania with the song "Run with the Lions". He competed in the second semi-final, placing 11th with 93 points, which was not sufficient to advance to the grand final.

=== 2020s ===
Lithuania selected The Roop to represent the country at the Eurovision Song Contest 2020 with "On Fire", but the contest was cancelled because of the COVID-19 pandemic. The group returned in 2021 with "Discoteque", qualifying in fourth from the first semi-final and finishing eighth in the final with 220 points. The result was Lithuania's second-best placing in the contest.

In 2022, Monika Liu represented Lithuania with "Sentimentai". The song was performed in Lithuanian, marking the first Lithuanian-language entry for the country since its 1994 debut. It qualified for the final after placing seventh in the first semifinal and finished 14th overall with 128 points. Monika Linkytė returned to the contest in 2023 with "Stay", placing 11th in the final with 127 points.

Lithuania was represented in 2024 by Silvester Belt with "Luktelk", which was selected through Eurovizija.LT. The song qualified from the first semi-final in fourth place and finished 14th in the final. In 2025, the alternative rock band Katarsis represented Lithuania with "Tavo akys". The entry qualified from the second semi-final and finished 16th in the final with 96 points.

In 2026, Lion Ceccah represented Lithuania with "Sólo quiero más". He was selected through Eurovizija.LT, after a national selection that included five weeks of semi-finals and 40 competing songs. The entry qualified from the first semi-final, becoming Lithuania's 6th consecutive qualifier, the longest qualification streak the country has had, and finished 22nd in the final with 22 points.

== Participation overview ==
Table key
3	Third place
◁	Last place
◇	Entry selected but did not compete
†	Upcoming event

Year	Artist	Song	Language	Final	Points	Semi	Points
1994	Ovidijus Vyšniauskas	"Lopšinė mylimai"	Lithuanian	25 ◁	0	No semi-finals	
1999	Aistė	"Strazdas"	Samogitian	20	13	No semi-finals	
2001	Skamp	"You Got Style"	English, Lithuanian	13	35	No semi-finals	
2002	Aivaras	"Happy You"	English	23	12	No semi-finals	
2004	Linas and Simona	"What's Happened to Your Love"	English	Failed to qualify		16	26
2005	Laura and the Lovers	"Little by Little"	English	Failed to qualify		25 ◁	17
2006	LT United	"We Are the Winners"	English	6	162	5	163
2007	4Fun	"Love or Leave"	English	21	28	Top 10 in 2006 final (Note: According to the then-Eurovision rules, the top ten non-Big Four countries from the previous year along with the Big Four automatically qualified for the Grand Final without having to compete in semi-finals. For example, if Germany and France placed inside the top ten, the 11th and 12th spots were advanced to next year's Grand Final along with all countries ranked in the top ten.)	
2008	Jeronimas Milius	"Nomads in the Night"	English	Failed to qualify		16	30
2009	Sasha Son	"Love"	English, Russian	23	23	9	66
2010	InCulto	"Eastern European Funk"	English	Failed to qualify		12	44
2011	Evelina Sašenko	"C'est ma vie"	English	19	63	5	81
2012	Donny Montell	"Love Is Blind"	English	14	70	3	104
2013	Andrius Pojavis	"Something"	English	22	17	9	53
2014	Vilija	"Attention"	English	Failed to qualify		11	36
2015	Monika Linkytė and Vaidas Baumila	"This Time"	English	18	30	7	67
2016	Donny Montell	"I've Been Waiting for This Night"	English	9	200	4	222
2017	Fusedmarc	"Rain of Revolution"	English	Failed to qualify		17	42
2018	Ieva Zasimauskaitė	"When We're Old"	English, Lithuanian	12	181	9	119
2019	Jurij Veklenko	"Run with the Lions"	English	Failed to qualify		11	93
2020	The Roop ◇	"On Fire" ◇	English ◇	Contest cancelled (Note: The 2020 contest was cancelled due to the COVID-19 pandemic.)			
2021	The Roop	"Discoteque"	English	8	220	4	203
2022	Monika Liu	"Sentimentai"	Lithuanian	14	128	7	159
2023	Monika Linkytė	"Stay"	English	11	127	4	110
2024	Silvester Belt	"Luktelk"	Lithuanian	14	90	4	119
2025	Katarsis	"Tavo akys"	Lithuanian	16	96	6	103
2026	Lion Ceccah	"Sólo quiero más"	Lithuanian, English	22	22	8	101
2027	TBD 20 February 2027 †			Upcoming †			

== Statistics ==
=== Songs by language ===
1. English (75.8%)
2. Lithuanian (17.2%)
3. Samogitian (3.70%)
4. French (1.30%)
5. Russian (1.23%)
6. Spanish (0.74%)

Songs	Language	Years
22	English	2001, 2002, 2004, 2005, 2006, 2007, 2008, 2009, 2010, 2011, 2012, 2013, 2014, 2015, 2016, 2017, 2018, 2019, ~~2020~~, 2021, 2023, 2026
7	Lithuanian	1994, 2001, 2018, 2022, 2024, 2025, 2026
3	French	2006, 2011, 2026
1	Samogitian	1999
1	Russian	2009
1	Spanish	2026

=== Selection process ===
Year	Selection process
1994	Internal selection
1999	National final with 12 participants
2001	National final with 15 participants
2002	National final with 15 participants
2004	National final with 52 participants (18 in the final)
2005	National final with 49 participants (20 in the final)
2006	National final with 47 participants (16 in the final)
2007	National final with 35 participants (11 in the final)
2008	National final with 32 participants (14 in the final)
2009	Lietuvos Dainų Daina with 36 participants (10 in the final)
2010	National final with 34 participants (12 in the final)
2011	National final with 40 participants (13 in the final)
2012	National final with 36 participants (14 in the final)
2013	National final with 39 participants (7 in the final)

Year	Selection process
2014	National final with 20 participants (3 in the final)
2015	National final with 12 participants (2 in the final)
2016	National final with 28 participants (6 in the final)
2017	National final with 49 participants (7 in the final)
2018	National final with 50 participants (6 in the final)
2019	National final with 49 participants (8 in the final)
~~2020~~	Pabandom iš naujo! with 36 participants (8 in the final)
2021	Pabandom iš naujo! with 21 participants (6 in the final)
2022	Pabandom iš naujo! with 34 participants (8 in the final)
2023	Pabandom iš naujo! with 30 participants (10 in the final)
2024	Eurovizija.LT with 40 participants (10 in the final)
2025	Eurovizija.LT with 45 participants (12 in the final)
2026	Eurovizija.LT with 40 participants (11 in the final)
2027	Eurovizija.LT with TBD participants (10 in the final)

== Awards ==
=== Winner by OGAE members ===
Year	Song	Performer	Final	Points	Host city	Ref.
2020	"On Fire"	The Roop	Contest cancelled		(Netherlands) Rotterdam	

=== Barbara Dex Award ===
Year	Performer	Host city	Ref.
2014	Vilija Matačiūnaitė	(Denmark) Copenhagen	

== Related involvement ==
=== Heads of delegation ===
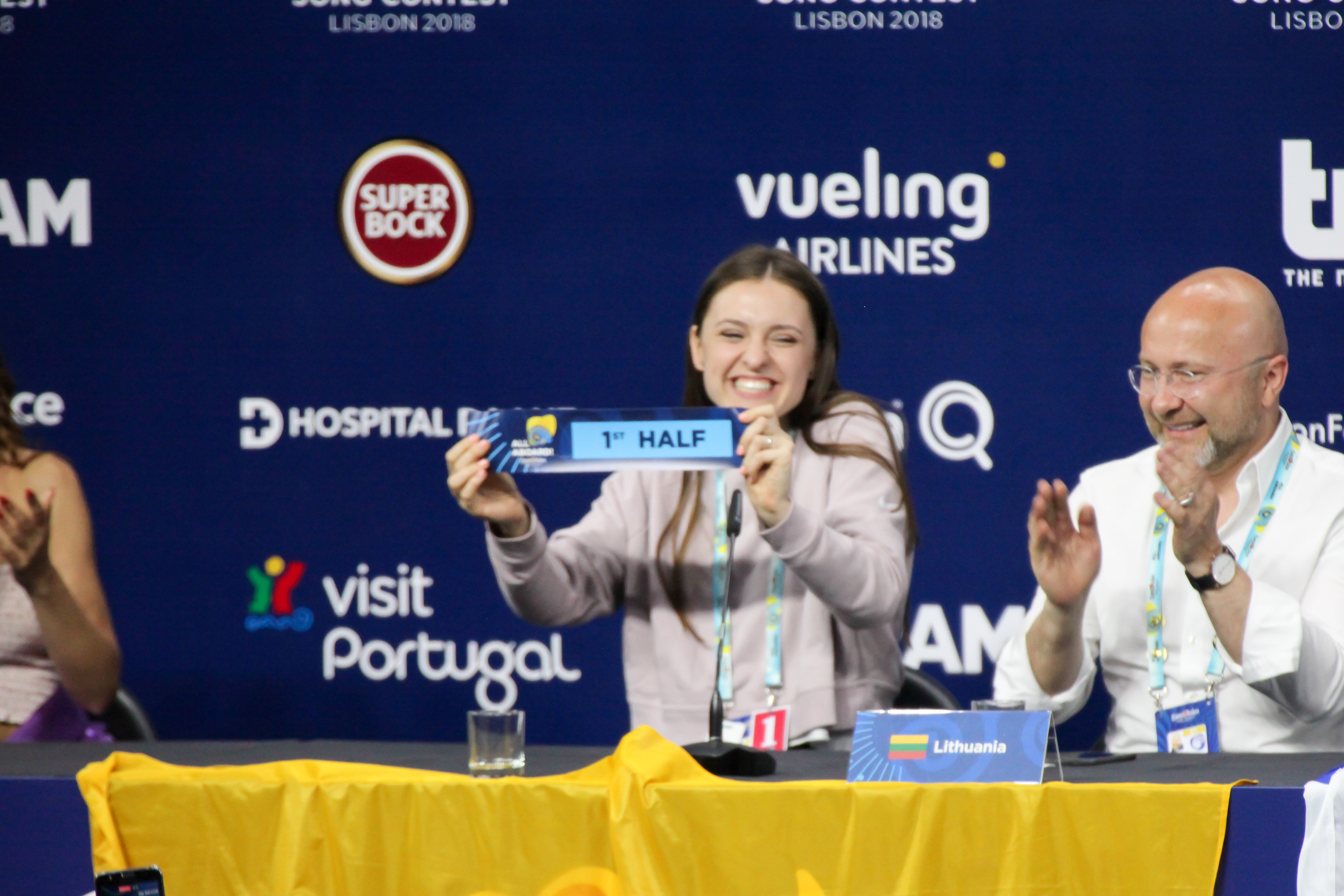
Audrius Giržadas (right) has served as the Head of Delegation for Lithuania since 2010.

Each participating broadcaster in the Eurovision Song Contest assigns a head of delegation as the EBU's contact person and the leader of their delegation at the event. The delegation, whose size can greatly vary, includes a head of press, the contestants, songwriters, composers, and backing vocalists, among others.

Year	Head of delegation	Ref.
1994	Irena Didžiulienė	
1999–2001	Nerijus Maliukevičius	
2002–2009	Jonas Vilimas	
2010–present	Audrius Giržadas	

=== Jury members ===
Each participating broadcaster assembles a five-member jury panel consisting of music industry professionals for the semi-finals and Grand Final of the Eurovision Song Contest, ranking all entries except for their own. The juries' votes constitute 50% of the overall result alongside televoting. The modern incarnation of jury voting was introduced beginning with the 2009 contest.

Year	Jury members							Ref.
2009	Linas Rimša	Linas Adomaitis	Egmontas Bžeskas	Edita Vilčiauskienė	Rūta Lukoševičiūtė	—N/a		
2014	Deivydas Zvonkus	Rūta Lukoševičiūtė	Povilas Varvuolis	Kristina Zmailaitė	Kristina Žaldokaitė	—N/a		
2015	Lauras Lučiūnas	Jolita Vaitkevičienė	Jurga Čekatauskaitė	Jurgis Brūzga	Rosita Čivilytė	—N/a		
2016	Nomeda Kazlaus	Vidas Bareikis	Justas Čekuolis	Vytautas Lukočius	Eglė Nepaitė-Abaravičienė	—N/a		
2017	Vytenis Pauliukaitis	Giedrė Kilčiauskienė	Viktorija Navickaitė	Rafailas Karpis	Vaidas Stackevičius	—N/a		
2018	Lauras Lučiūnas	Jurga Šeduikytė	Dovilė Filmanavičiūtė	Mindaugas Urbaitis	Leon Somov	—N/a		
2019	Vytautas Bikus	Andrius Mamontovas	Jurgis Brūzga	Girmantė Vaitkutė	Gerūta Griniūtė	—N/a		
2021	Jievaras Jasinskis	Rafailas Karpis	Giedrė Kilčiauskienė	Bjelle	Darius Užkuraitis	—N/a		
2022	Aistė Lasytė	Darius Užkuraitis	Ieva Narkutė	Jurga Šeduikytė	Vaidas Baumila	—N/a		
2023	Jonas Nainys	Julijus Grickevičius	Vaidotas Valiukevičius	Eglė Juozapaitienė	Nombeko Augustė	—N/a		
2024	Jievaras Jasinskis	Kristupas Naraškevičius	Povilas Meškėla	Agneta Gabalytė	Monika Marija	—N/a		
2025	Bjelle	Rosita Čivilytė	Pijus Opera	Vaidas Stackevičius	Eglė Kernagytė	—N/a		
2026	Benas Kukenys	Darius Dapkus	Marijanas Staniulėnas	Rokas Jančiauskas	Justė Komskytė Vaiciekiūtė	Kamilė Tumelytė	Paulina Skrabytė	

=== Commentators and spokespersons ===
LRT usually broadcasts all shows in Lithuania on LRT televizija and on LRT radijas as well as online via the broadcaster's website lrt.lt. For the show's broadcast on LRT several commentators have provided comment on the contest in the local language. Darius Užkuraitis was Eurovision commentator in Lithuania as many as 19 times. He was replaced by Ramūnas Zilnys in 2021. At the Eurovision Song Contest after all points are calculated, the presenters of the show call upon each voting country to invite each respective spokesperson to announce the results of their vote on-screen.

Year	Commentator	Spokesperson	Ref.
1994	Unknown	Gitana Lapinskaitė	
1995	No broadcast	Did not participate	
1996	Unknown	Did not participate	
1997	No broadcast	Did not participate	
1998	Unknown	Did not participate	
1999	Unknown	Andrius Tapinas	
2000	Ramūnas Česonis and Vilija Grigonytė	Did not participate	
2001	Darius Užkuraitis	Loreta Tarozaitė	
2002	Darius Užkuraitis	Loreta Tarozaitė	
2003	Darius Užkuraitis	Did not participate	
2004	Darius Užkuraitis	Rolandas Vilkončius	
2005	Darius Užkuraitis	Rolandas Vilkončius	
2006	Darius Užkuraitis	Lavija Šurnaitė	
2007	Darius Užkuraitis	Lavija Šurnaitė	
2008	Darius Užkuraitis	Rolandas Vilkončius	
2009	Darius Užkuraitis	Ignas Krupavičius	
2010	Darius Užkuraitis	Giedrius Masalskis	
2011	Darius Užkuraitis	Giedrius Masalskis	
2012	Darius Užkuraitis	Ignas Krupavičius	
2013	Darius Užkuraitis	Ignas Krupavičius	
2014	Darius Užkuraitis	Ignas Krupavičius	
2015	Darius Užkuraitis	Ugnė Galadauskaitė	
2016	Darius Užkuraitis	Ugnė Galadauskaitė	
2017	Darius Užkuraitis and Gerūta Griniūtė	Eglė Daugėlaitė	
2018	Darius Užkuraitis and Gerūta Griniūtė	Eglė Daugėlaitė	
2019	Darius Užkuraitis and Gerūta Griniūtė	Giedrius Masalskis (Note: Andrius Mamontovas was initially appointed to be the spokesperson of Lithuania in 2019, but was not able to perform the role because he was a member of the jury that year. Mamontovas later announced Lithuania's points in 2021 contest.)	
2021	Ramūnas Zilnys	Andrius Mamontovas	
2022	Ramūnas Zilnys	Vaidotas Valiukevičius	
2023	Ramūnas Zilnys	Monika Liu	
2024	Ramūnas Zilnys	Monika Linkytė	
2025	Ramūnas Zilnys	Silvester Belt	
2026	Ramūnas Zilnys	Lukas Radzevičius	

==== Other shows ====
Show	Commentator	Ref.
Congratulations: 50 Years of the Eurovision Song Contest	Rolandas Vilkončius	
Eurovision: Europe Shine a Light	Ramūnas Zilnys	

=== Stage directors ===
The appointed stage directors are responsible for directing the country's live performance, for camerawork and for the visuals used.

Year	Stage directors	Ref.
1999	Irena Morkevičienė	
2006	Donatas Ulvydas	
2008	Dalius Abaris and Vytautas Dambrauskas	
2016	Sacha Jean-Baptiste	
2017	Povilas Varvuolis	
2018	Povilas Varvuolis and Rasa Micachienė	
2019	Povilas Varvuolis	
2021	Povilas Varvuolis	
2022	Povilas Varvuolis	
2023	Povilas Varvuolis	
2024	Povilas Varvuolis and Norvydas Genys	
2025	Povilas Varvuolis, Paulius Varonenka and Ignas Blažys	
2026	Povilas Varvuolis and Mantas Frolenko	

=== Costume designers ===
Year	Costume designers	Ref.
1999	Juozas Statkevičius	
2001	Daiva Urbonavičiūtė	
2007	Aleksandras Pogrebnojus and Vida Simanavičiūtė	
2012	Egidijus Sidaras	
2014	Olga Filatova-Kontrimienė	
2015	Kristina Kalinauskaitė and Andrius Sergejenko	
2016	Marius Stanevičius	
2017	Sandra Yushka	
2018	Vida Strasevičiūtė and Thomas Bara	
2021	Glorija Gžimailaitė	
2022	Monika Kazakevičiūtė-Kriščiūnienė	
2023	Omar Bayoumi	
2024	Vainotas Jakštas	
2025	Karina Panina	
2026	Marija Petraitytė	

=== Conductors ===
Tomas Leiburas was the only Lithuanian conductor in Eurovision as he conducted their 1994 entry.

== Photo gallery ==
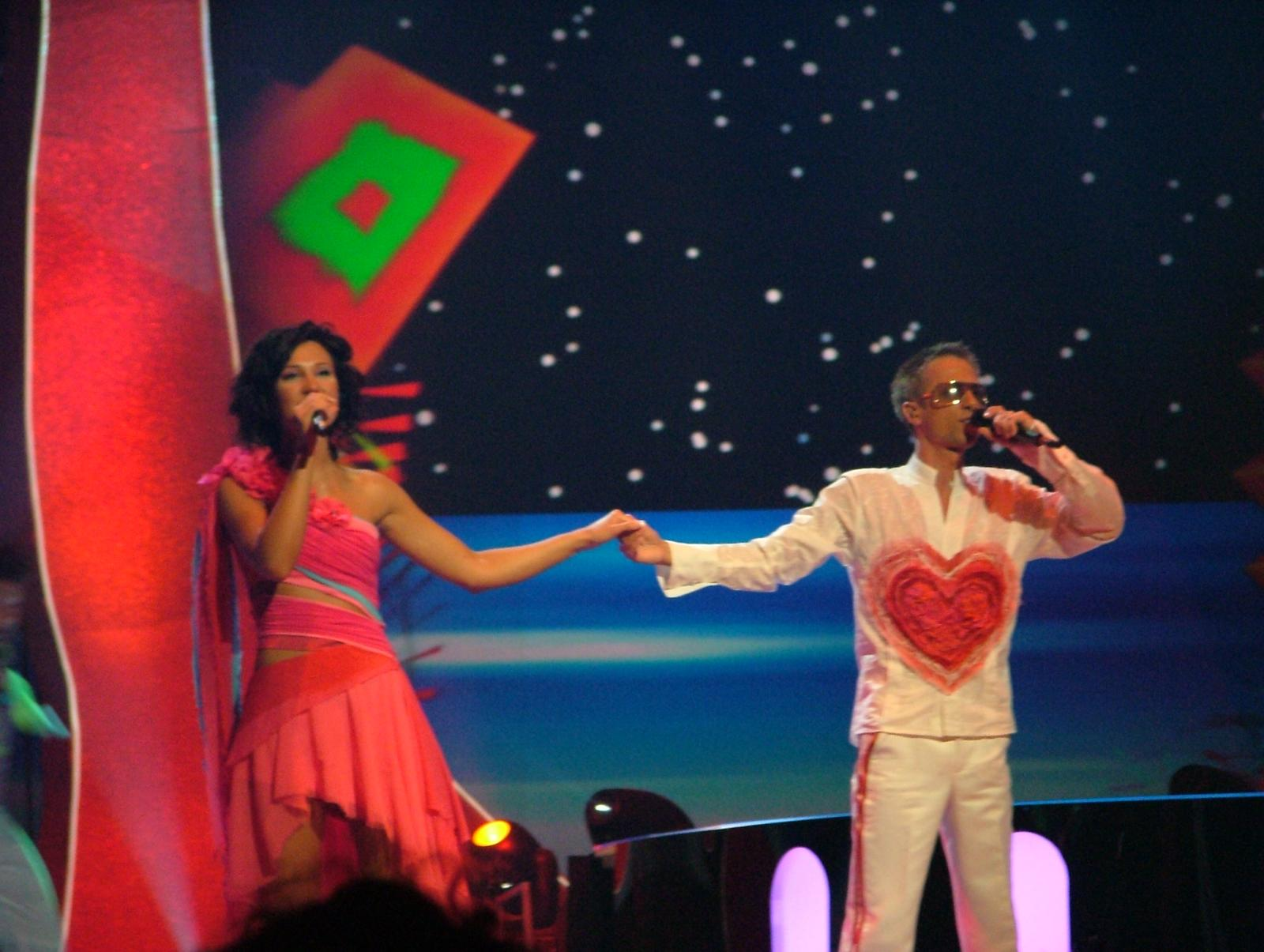
Linas and Simona in Istanbul (2004)

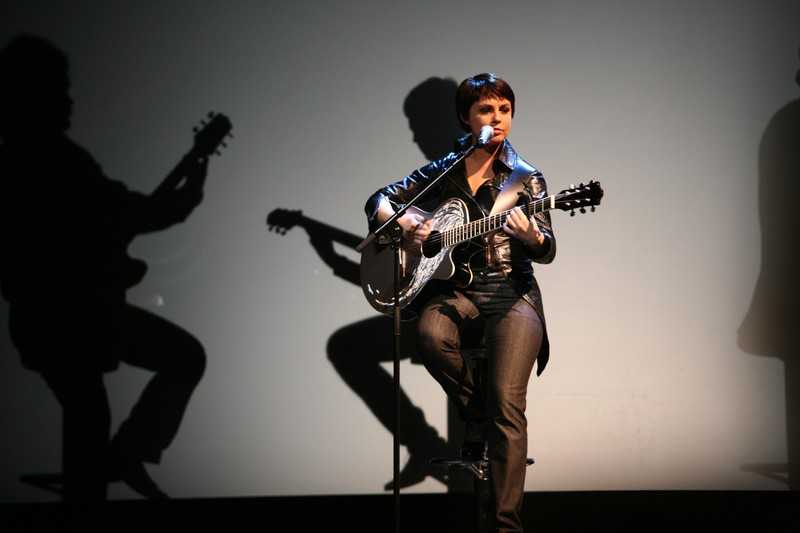
4Fun in Helsinki (2007)

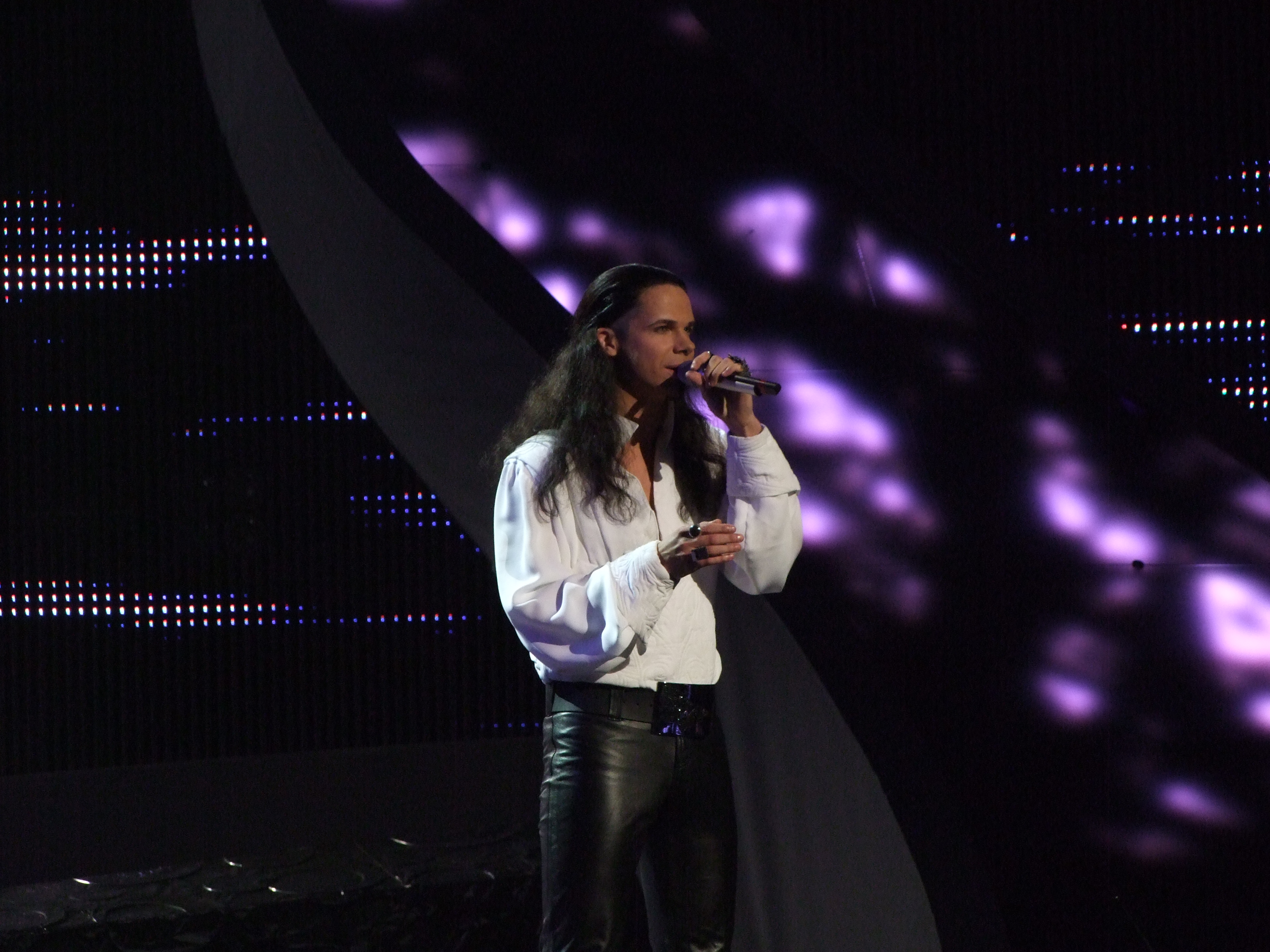
Jeronimas Milius in Belgrade (2008)

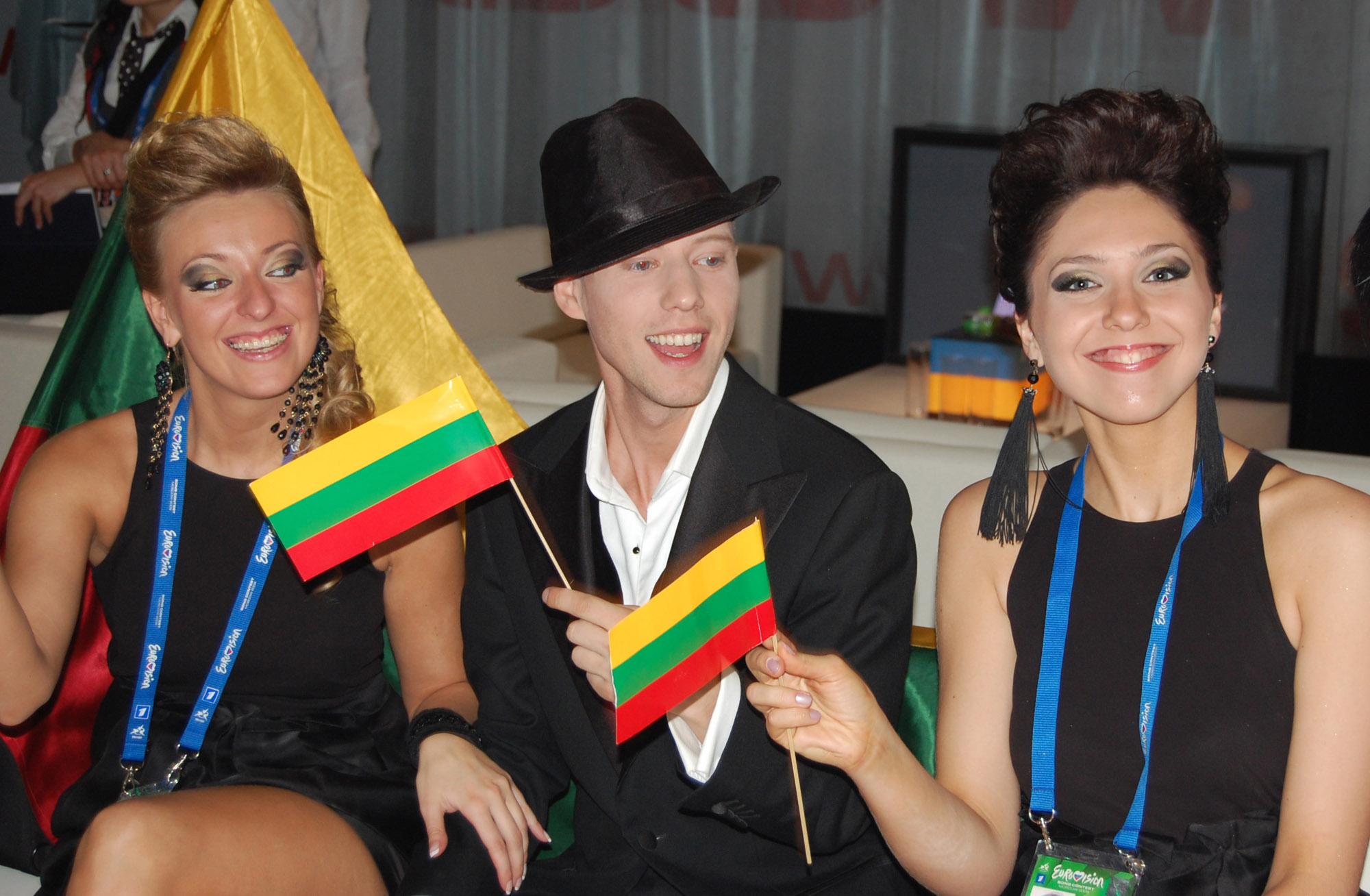
Sasha Son in Moscow (2009)

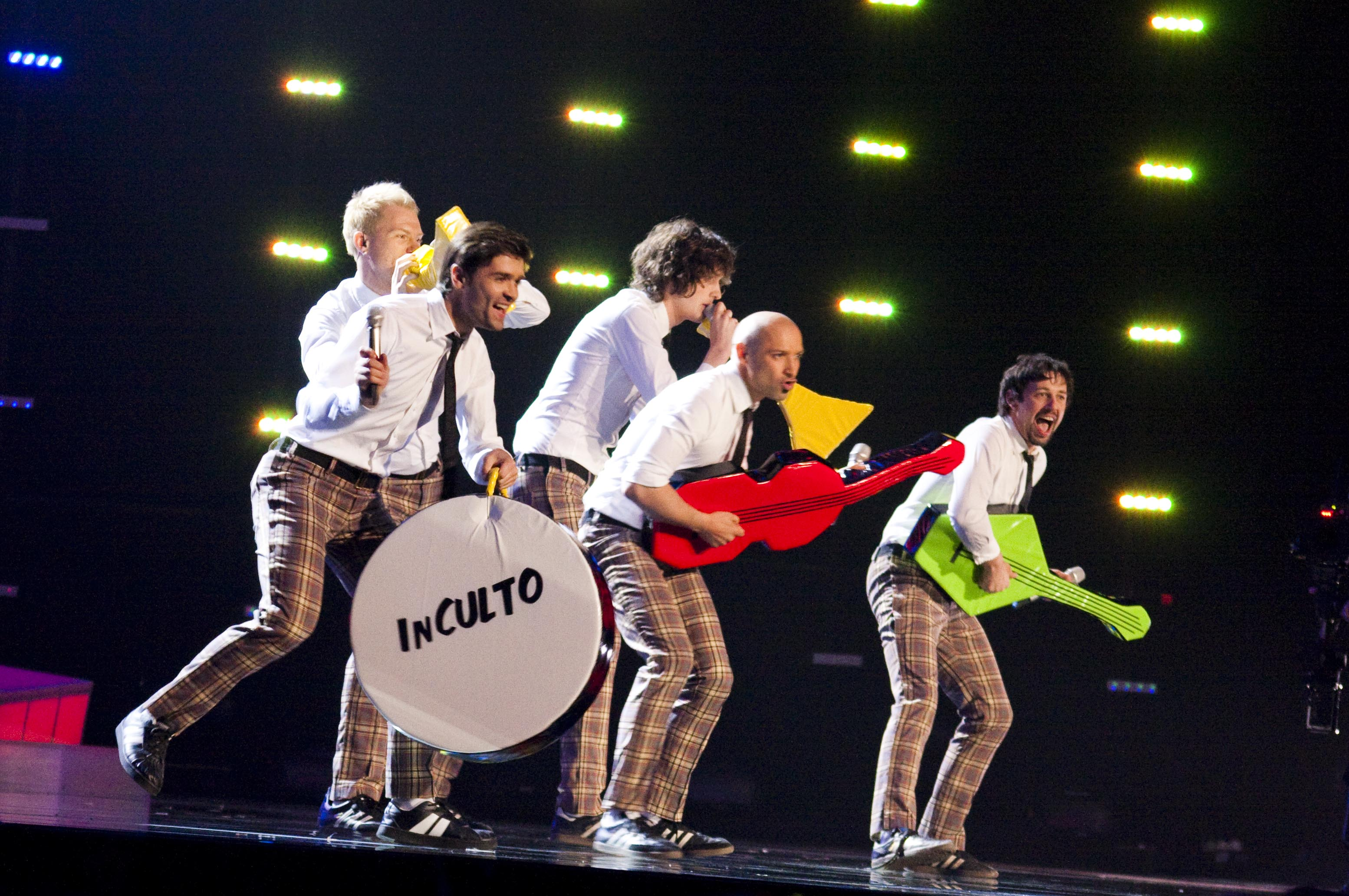
InCulto in Oslo (2010)

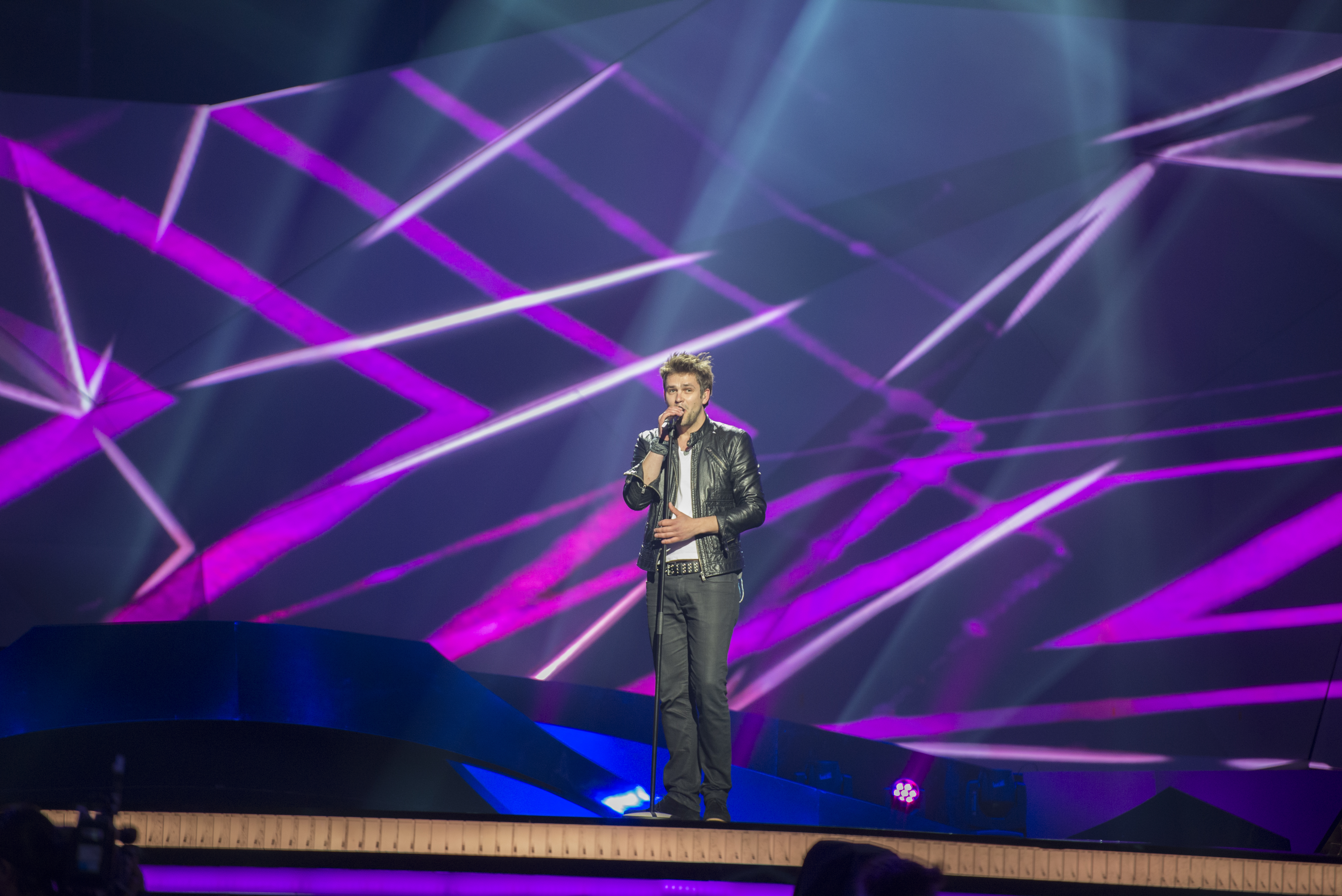
Andrius Pojavis in Malmö (2013)

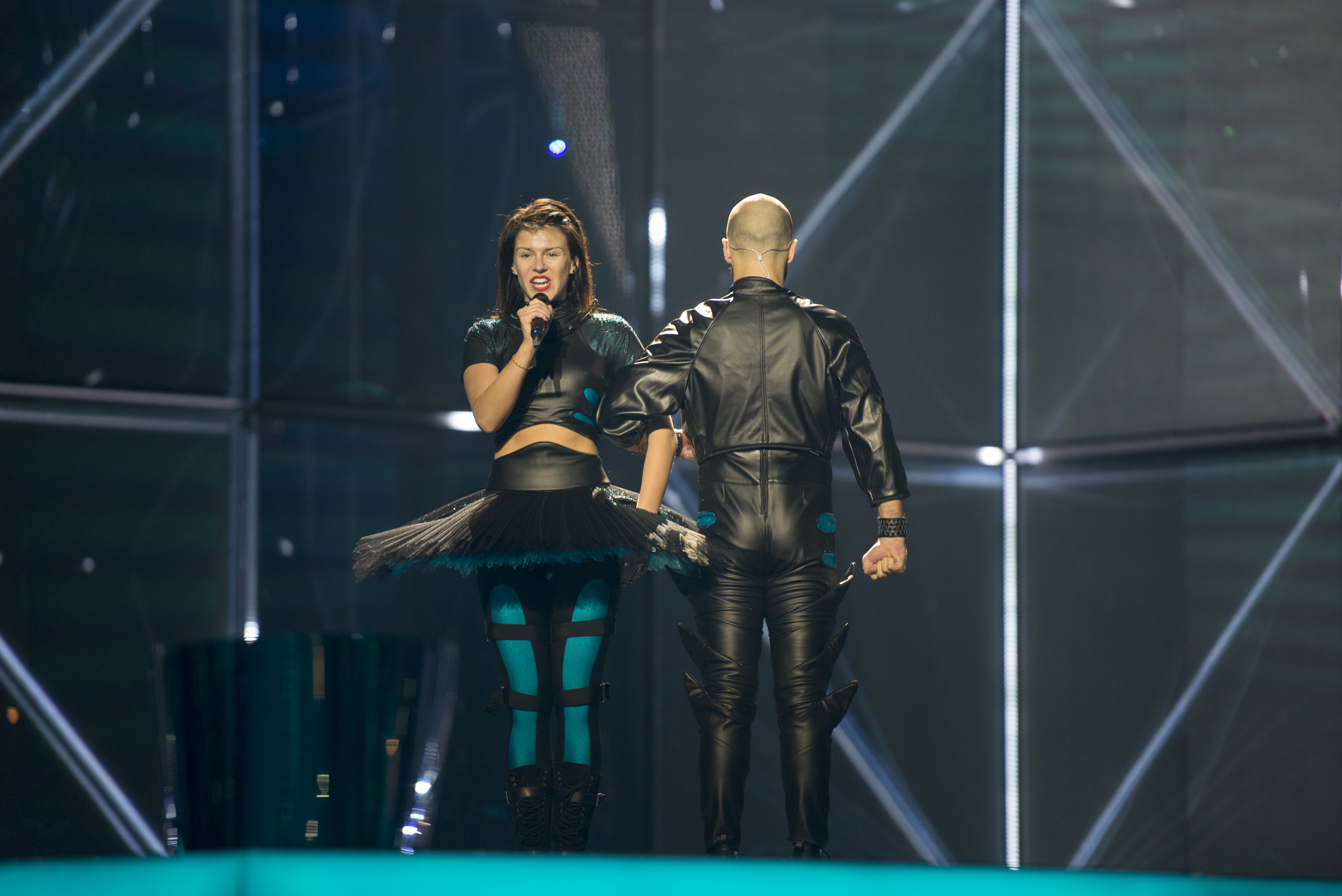
Vilija in Copenhagen (2014)

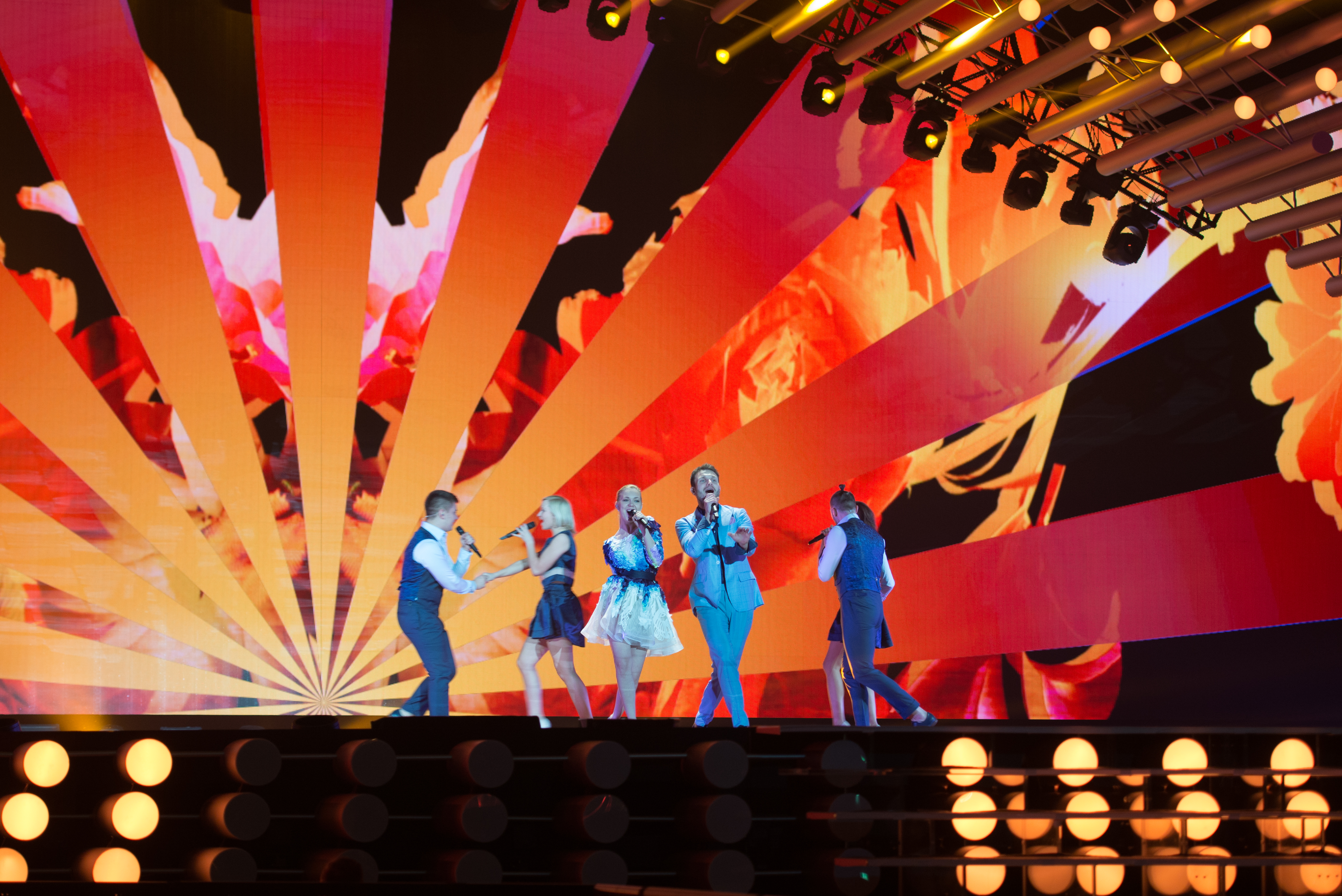
Monika Linkytė and Vaidas Baumila in Vienna (2015)

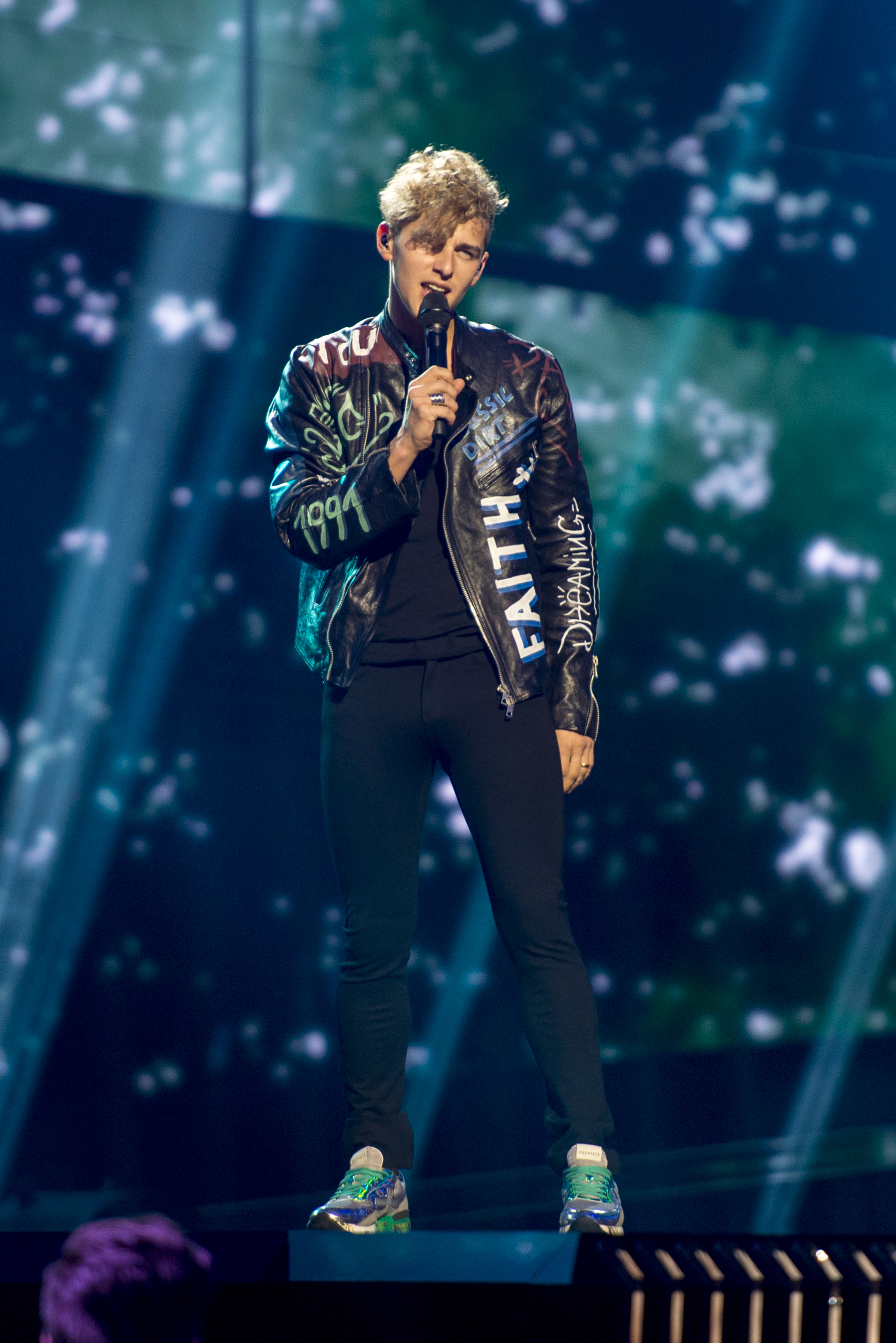
Donny Montell in Stockholm (2016)

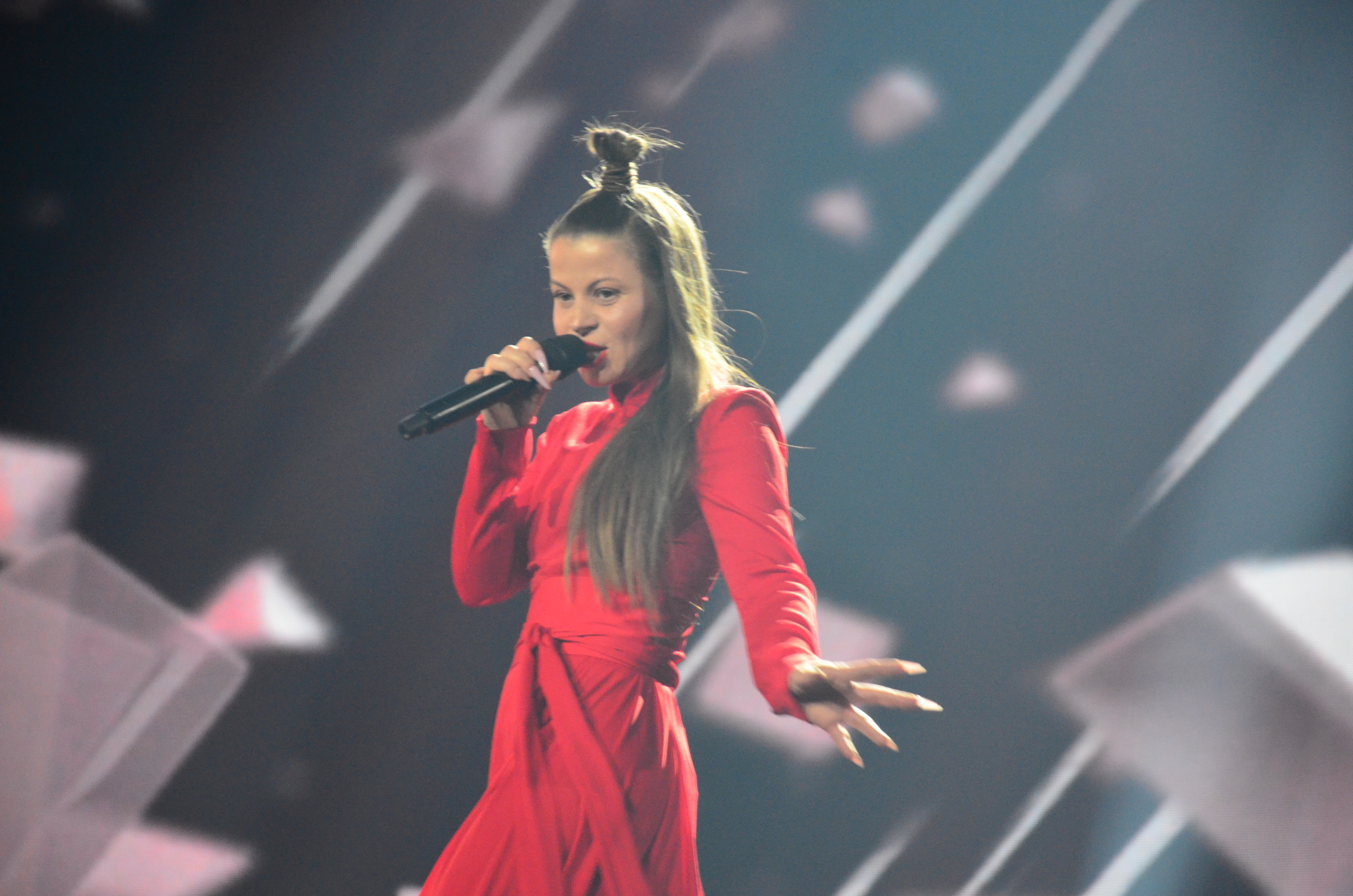
Fusedmarc in Kyiv (2017)

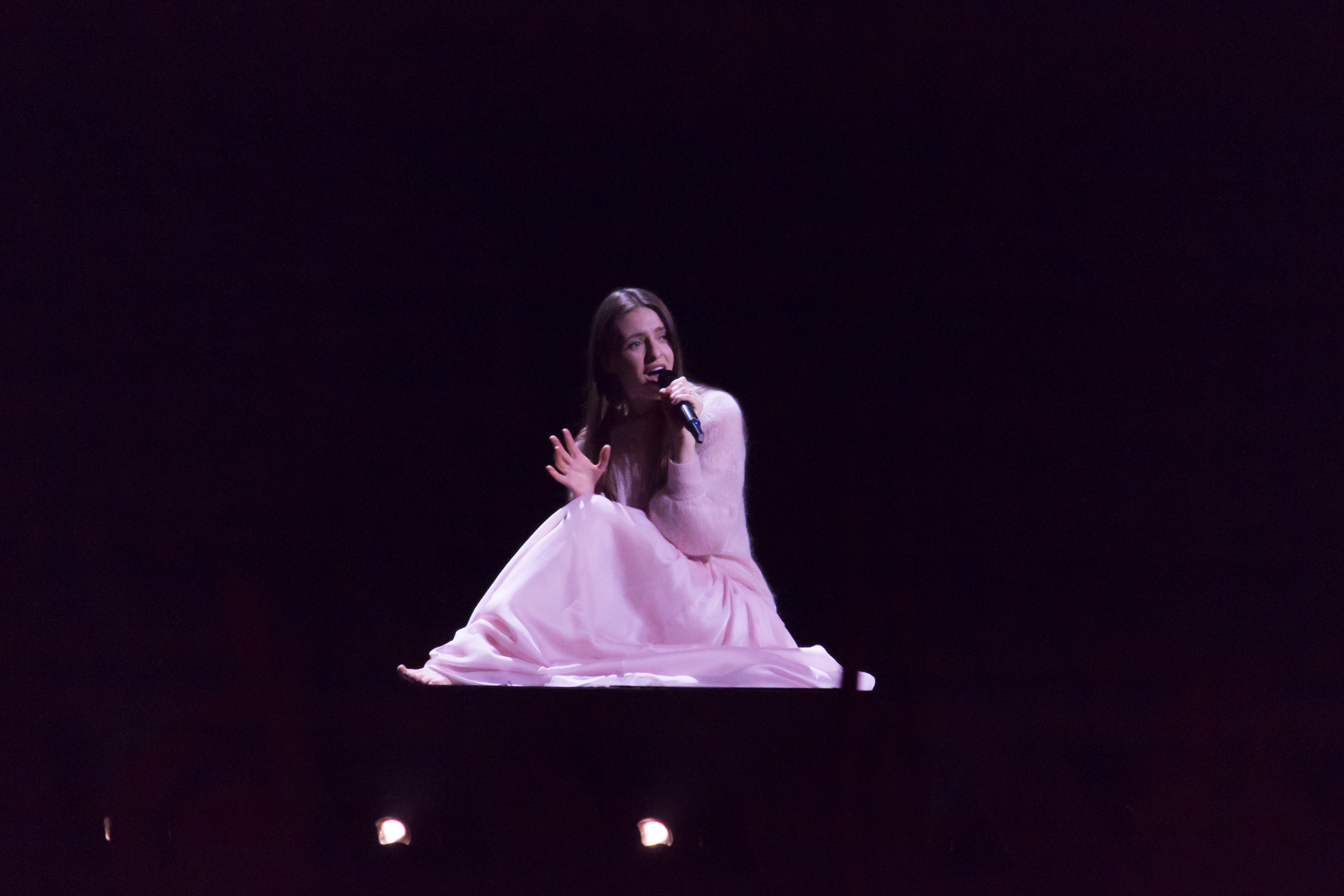
Ieva Zasimauskaitė in Lisbon (2018)

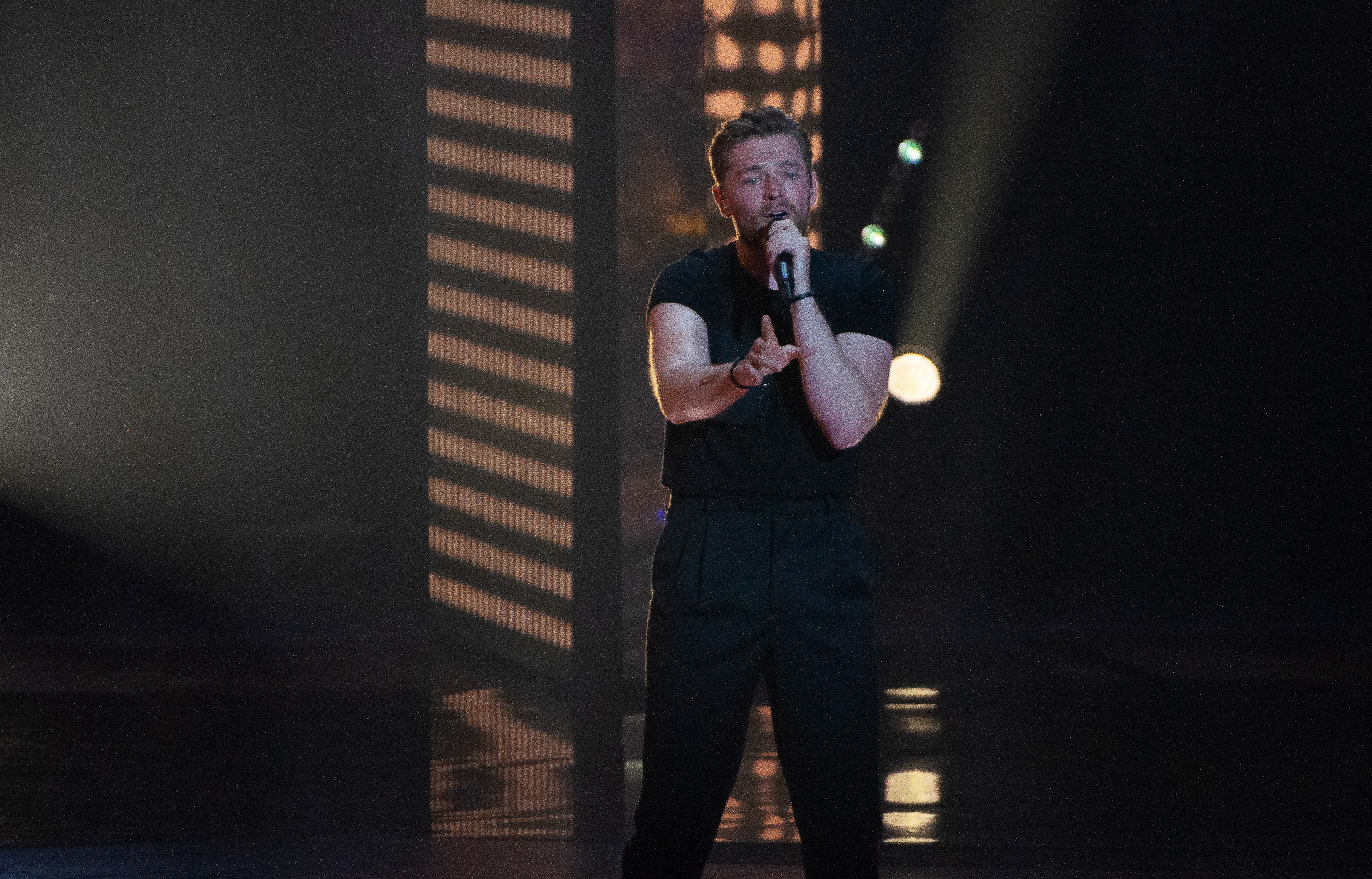
Jurij Veklenko in Tel Aviv (2019)

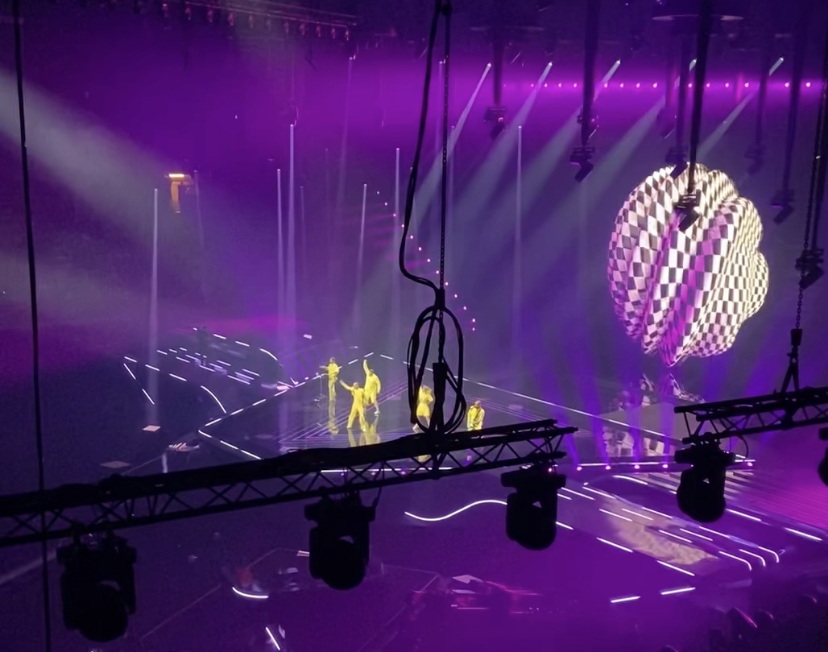
The Roop in Rotterdam (2021)

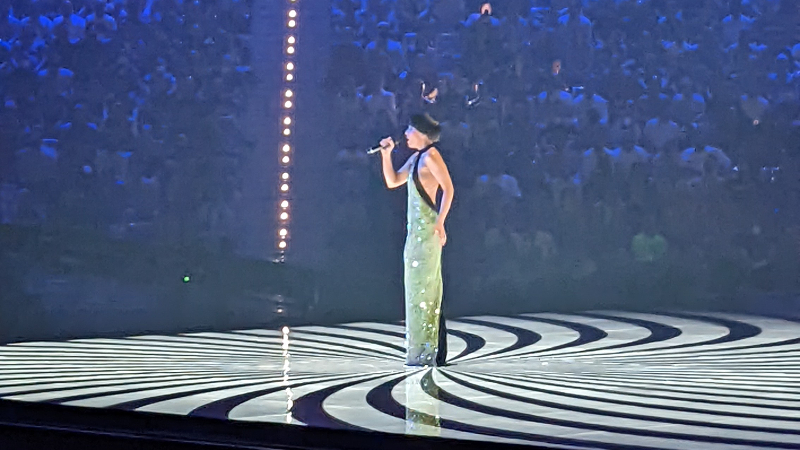
Monika Liu in Turin (2022)

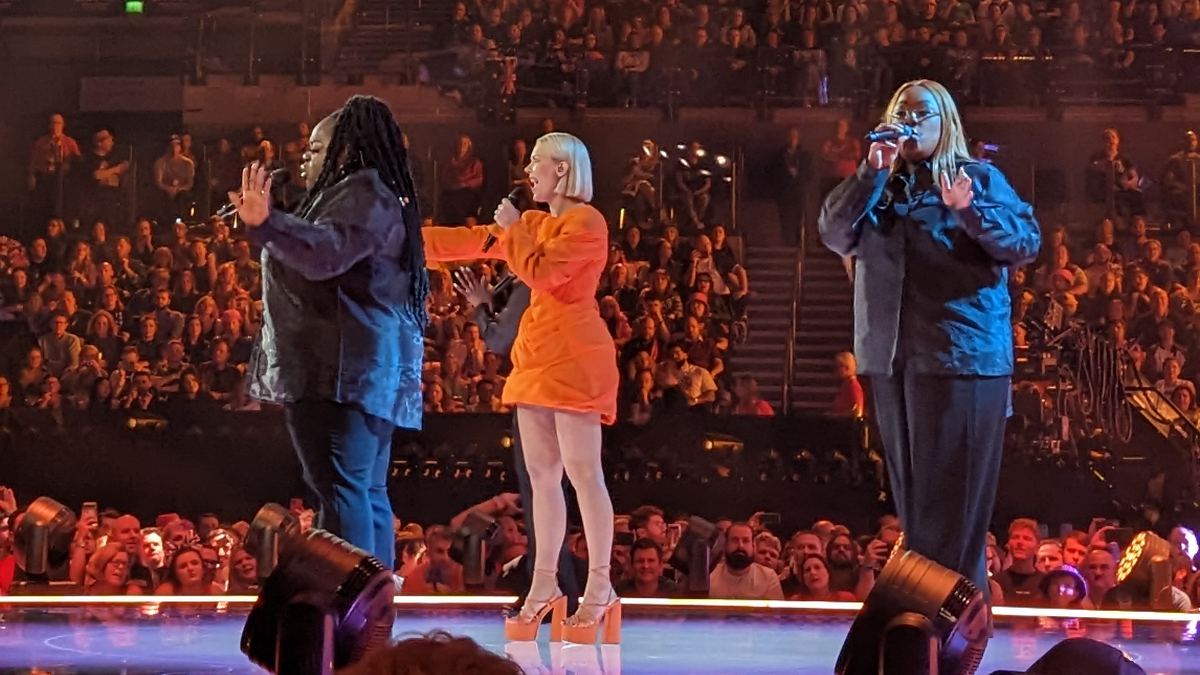
Monika Linkytė in Liverpool (2023)

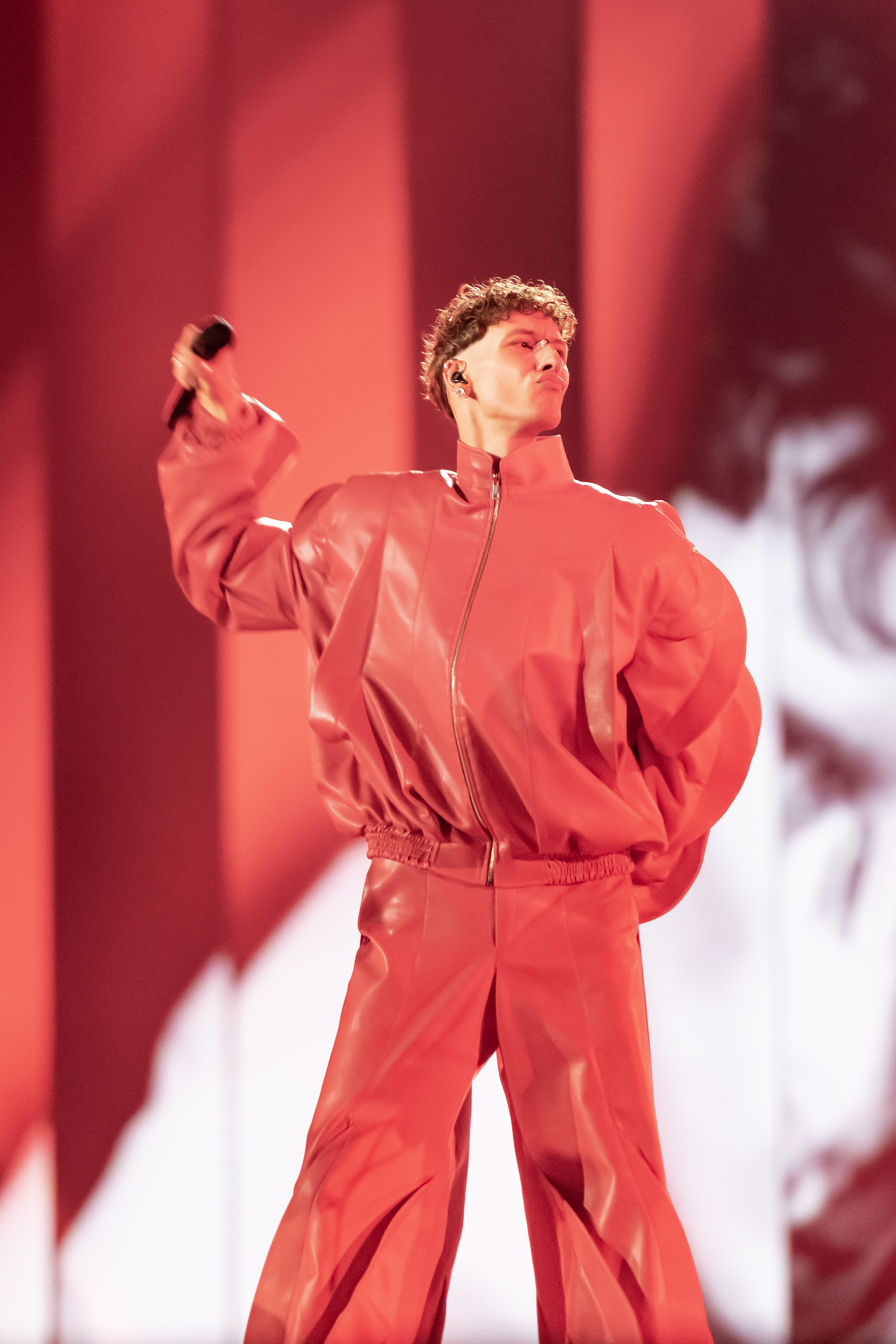
Silvester Belt in Malmö (2024)

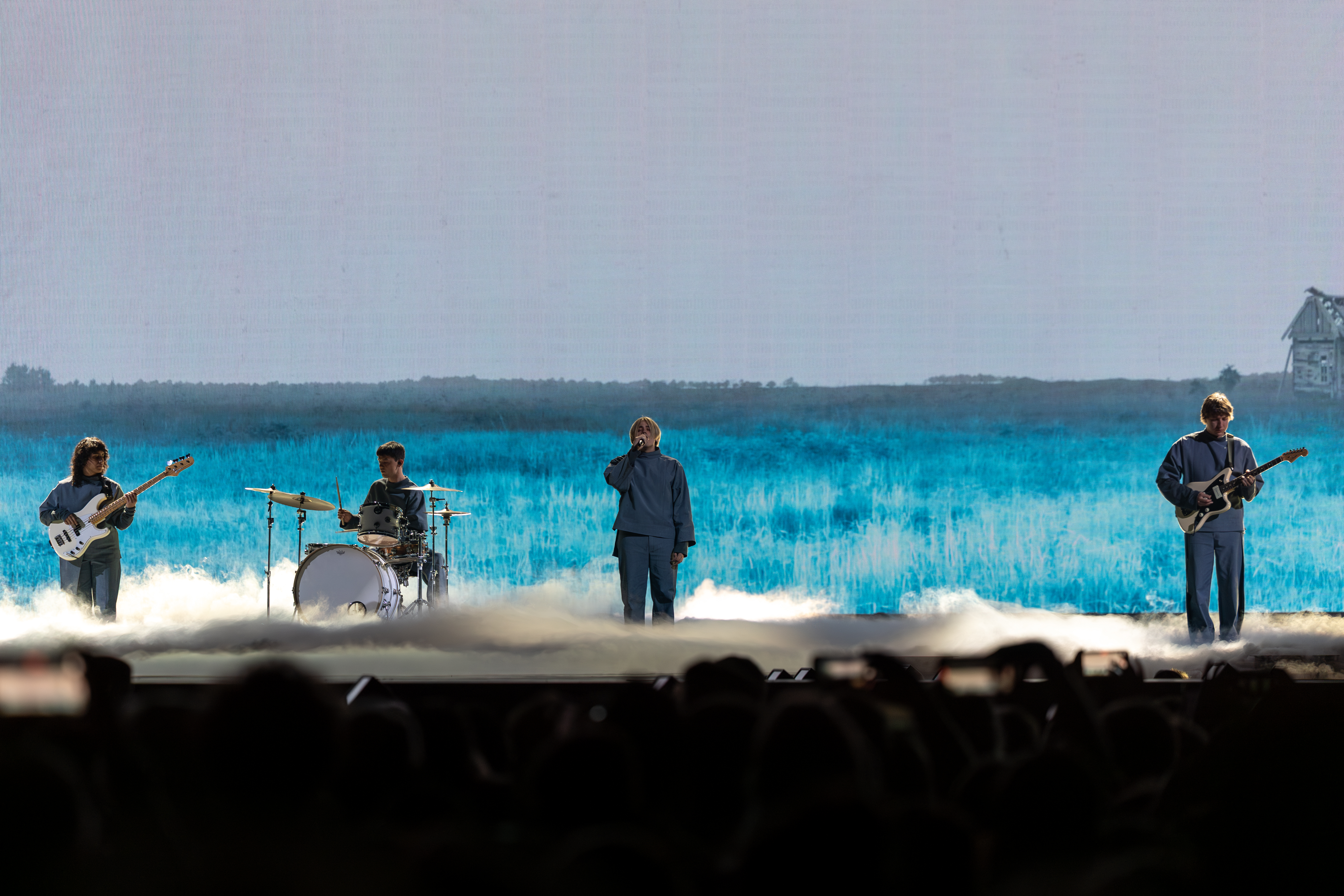
Katarsis in Basel (2025)

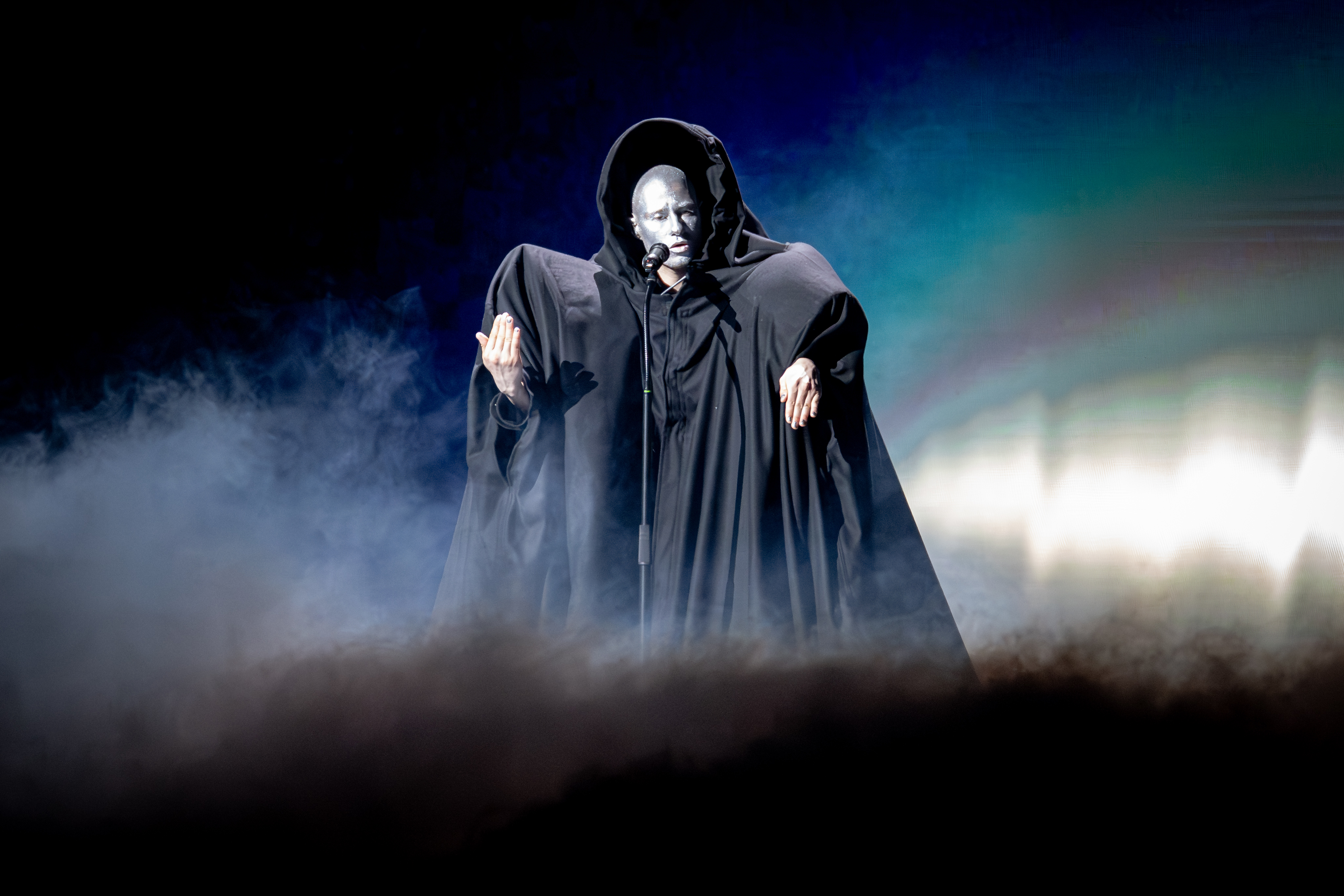
Lion Ceccah in Vienna (2026)

== See also ==
- Lithuania in the Junior Eurovision Song Contest – Junior version of the Eurovision Song Contest.
