= Andrius Pojavis =

Lithuanian singer-songwriter

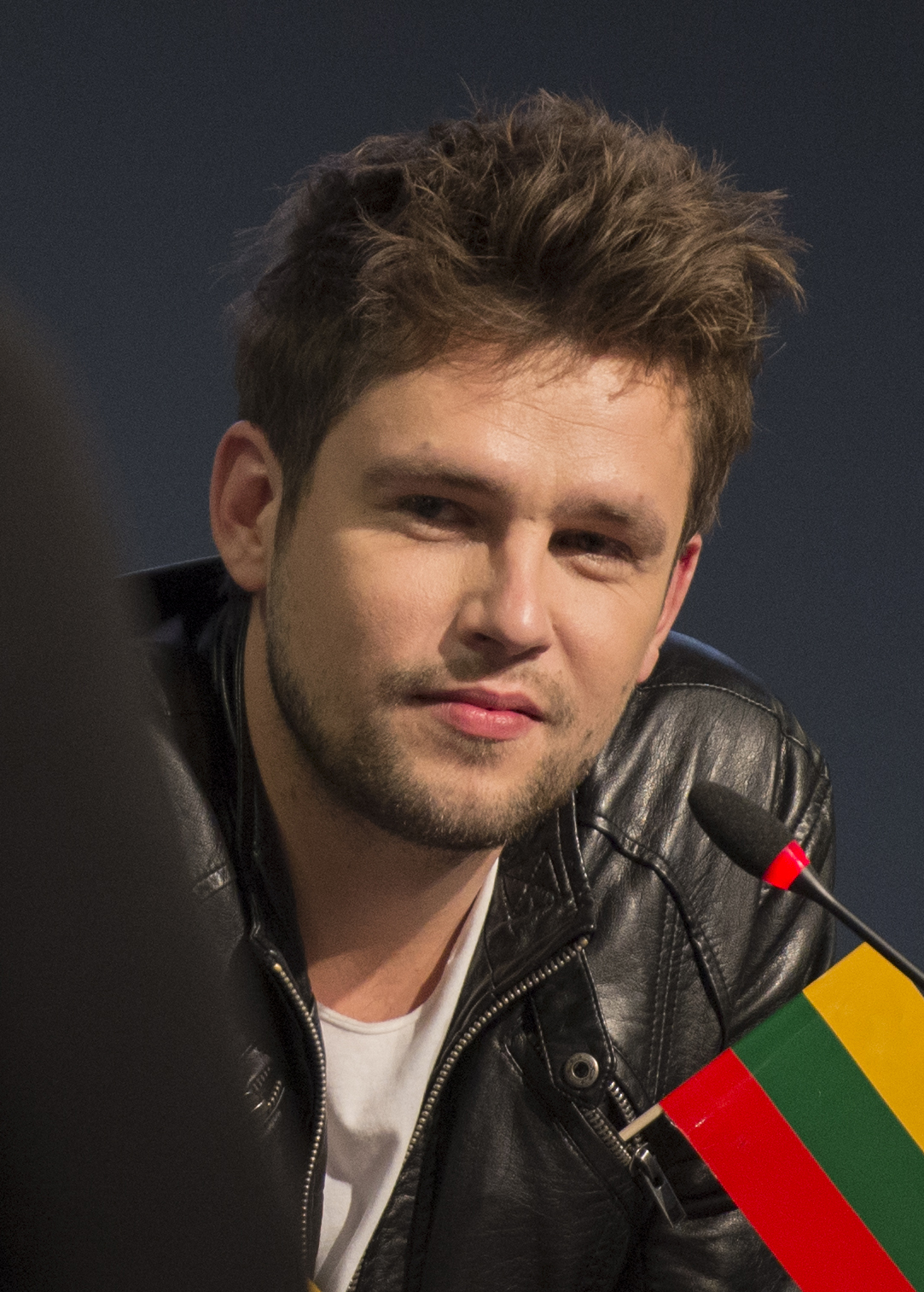
- Andrius Pojavis at a press conference four days before the Eurovision Song Contest 2013.

Background information
- Born: 25 November 1983 (age 42); Jurbarkas, then part of Lithuanian SSR, Soviet Union
- Genres: Pop
- Instruments: Vocals, bass guitar
- Years active: 2012–present

Andrius Pojavis (born 25 November 1983) is a Lithuanian singer-songwriter. On 20 December 2012, he was selected to represent Lithuania at the Eurovision Song Contest 2013, which was held in Malmö, Sweden on 18 May 2013.

== Early career ==
Pojavis began singing at a young age, and during high school, he played in a band called "No Hero". After graduating from high school, Pojavis moved to Vilnius, where he graduated with a degree in History studies from the Lithuanian University of Educational Sciences and played in a number of bands, including "Hetero", who won the "EuroRock" competition in 2006. He later moved to Ireland, where he lived for one year, and began to write solo material. In 2012, Pojavis began to record his debut album at Massive Arts studio in Milan, Italy. The first single "Traukiniai" was later that year, ranking within the top twenty of the Lithuanian Singles Chart, and its music video was aired on national television. Following this success, Pojavis released his debut album "Aštuoni" to both commercial and critical acclaim in Lithuania.

== Eurovision ==
Andrius represented Lithuania at the Eurovision Song Contest 2013 with the song "Something." He collected 53 points in the first semi final, held on 14 May, and placed ninth. In the final, he came twenty-second with 17 points. During a press conference held following the first semi final, Pojavis stated he would like to place eighth, a reference to his album, titled Aštuoni.

On 19 December 2023, he was announced among the competing artists of Eurovizija.LT, the Lithuanian national final for the Eurovision Song Contest 2024, with the song "Sing Me a Hug". He came last in the second semi-final on 20 January 2024, not qualifying for the final.

== Personal life ==
Pojavis is currently living in Valencia, Spain with his wife and two daughters.

Awards and achievements
Preceded by Donny Montell with "Love Is Blind"	Lithuania in the Eurovision Song Contest; 2013	Succeeded by Vilija with "Attention"
