= Lithuania in the Eurovision Song Contest 2013 =

- Eurovision Song Contest 2013
- Country: Lithuania
- Selection process: "Eurovizijos" dainų konkurso nacionalinė atranka
- Selection date: 20 December 2012

Competing entry
- Song: "Something"
- Artist: Andrius Pojavis
- Songwriters: Andrius Pojavis

Placement
- Semi-final result: Qualified (9th, 53 points)
- Final result: 22nd, 17 points

Participation chronology

Lithuania was represented at the Eurovision Song Contest 2013 with the song "Something", written and performed by Andrius Pojavis. The Lithuanian broadcaster Lithuanian National Radio and Television (LRT) organised the national final "Eurovizijos" dainų konkurso nacionalinė atranka (Eurovision Song Contest national selection) in order to select the Lithuanian entry for the 2013 contest in Malmö, Sweden. The national final took place over ten weeks and involved 39 competing entries. In the final, seven entries remained, and the winner was selected over two rounds of voting. In the first round, the combination of votes from a jury panel and a public vote selected the top three to qualify for the superfinal. In the superfinal, a jury vote entirely selected "Something", performed by Andrius Pojavis, as the winner.

Lithuania was drawn to compete in the first semi-final of the Eurovision Song Contest which took place on 14 May 2013. Performing during the show in position 10, "Something" was announced among the top 10 entries of the first semi-final and therefore qualified to compete in the final on 18 May. It was later revealed that Lithuania placed ninth out of the 16 participating countries in the semifinal with 53 points. In the final, Lithuania performed in position 2 and placed twenty-second out of the 26 participating countries with 17 points.

== Background ==
Prior to the 2013 contest, Lithuania had participated in the Eurovision Song Contest thirteen times since its first entry in 1994. The nation's best placing in the contest was sixth, which it achieved in 2006 with the song "We Are the Winners", performed by LT United. Following the introduction of semi-finals in 2004, Lithuania, to this point, had managed to qualify for the final five times. In the 2012 contest, "Love Is Blind" performed by Donny Montell qualified to the final, where the song scored 70 points and placed 14th.

For the 2013 contest, the Lithuanian national broadcaster, Lithuanian National Radio and Television (LRT), broadcast the event within Lithuania and organised the selection process for the nation's entry. Other than the internal selection of their debut entry in 1994, Lithuania has selected their entry consistently through a national final procedure. LRT confirmed their intentions to participate at the 2013 Eurovision Song Contest on 12 September 2012 and announced the organization of "Eurovizijos" dainų konkurso nacionalinė atranka, which would be the national final to select Lithuania's entry for Malmö.

== Before Eurovision ==
=== "Eurovizijos" dainų konkurso nacionalinė atranka ===
"Eurovizijos" dainų konkurso nacionalinė atranka (Eurovision Song Contest national selection) was the national final format developed by LRT in order to select Lithuania's entry for the Eurovision Song Contest 2013. The competition involved an eight-week-long process that commenced on 3 November 2012 and concluded with a winning song and artist on 20 December 2012. The ten shows took place at the LRT studios in Vilnius and were hosted by Andrius Rožickas. The shows were broadcast on LRT televizija, LRT Lituanica, and LRT Radijas, as well as online via the broadcaster's website lrt.lt. The final was also streamed online on the official Eurovision Song Contest website eurovision.tv.

==== Format ====
The 2013 competition involved 39 entries and consisted of ten shows. The first two shows were the introductory shows, where the competing artists covered Lithuanian and foreign hit songs. The third to seventh shows were the heats, consisting of seven or eight entries each. The top three entries from each heat proceeded in the competition, while LRT also selected three wildcard acts out of the remaining non-qualifying acts from the heats. The eighth and ninth shows were the competition's semi-finals, where nine entries participated in each show, and the top four from each proceeded to the final. In the final, the winner was selected from the remaining eight entries over two rounds of voting. The first round results selected the top three entries, while the second round determined the winner.

The results of each of the five heats were determined by a jury panel and public televoting. The qualifiers during the semi-finals and the first round of the final were determined by the 50/50 combination of votes from the jury and public. The ranking developed by both streams of voting was converted to points from 1–8, 10 and 12 and assigned based on the number of competing songs in the respective show. The public could vote through telephone and SMS voting. Ties were decided in favour of the entry that received the most points from the jury. In the second round of the final, only the jury voted.

==== Competing entries ====
LRT opened a submission period on 12 September 2012 for artists and songwriters to submit their entries with the deadline on 1 October 2012. Both artists and songwriters could also apply separately. The 39 entries selected for the competition were announced during the introductory shows on 20 and 27 October 2012. Among the artists was previous Lithuanian Eurovision contestant Linas Adomaitis, who represented Lithuania in 2004.

Artist	Song	Songwriter(s)
Al Bagdo	"Backdoor Superman"	Vytautas Diškevičius
Alive Way	"Revolution"	Justinas Stanislovaitis
Andrius Pojavis	"Something"	Andrius Pojavis
Baiba Skurstene	"I'm on Fire"	Vytautas Bikus
Beissoul and Gabrielė Griciūtė	"Beautiful Life"	Raigardas Tautkus, Raimondas J. Nabus, Beissoul, Gabrielė Griciūtė
Berta Timinskaitė	"Missing You, Missing Me"	Eric Palmqwist, Erik Nyholm, Johan Gunnarsson
Božolė	"Happy and Free"	Andrius Borisevičius
Chill Out, Have No Doubt	"Time"	Vytautas Karpauskas, Daniel Okeoghene Williams
DAR	"Jump!"	Arvydas Martinėnas, Gorgi
D'Oro	"Will You Recognize Me?"	Gediminas Rimkus Rimkevičius, Jurgita Čekatauskaitė
Eden	"War Without End"	Andrej Viazinin, Jan Suchodolski, Oksana Treščenko
Eglė Jakštytė	"Give Me the Music"	Justinas Chachlauskas, Algis Gintautas
El Fuego	"Ledo gabalėlis"	Laura Remeikienė
Elvina Milkauskaitė	"Closer"	Raigardas Tautkus, Žaneta Daubarytė
Feliksas Merlin	"Silent Scream"	Feliksas Kutka, Rodion Kolomin
Freezing Kiss	"Nothing to Lose"	Paulius Jasiūnas, Sergėjus Kosiuga
Gabrielius Vagelis	"Sacrifice"	Erik Nyholm, Niklas Hast, Sam McCarthy
Gerai Gerai and Miss Sheep	"War in the Wardrobe"	Vilius Tamošaitis
Giedrė Smolskaitė	"Stay Awake Tonight"	Raigardas Tautkus, Gabrielė Griciūtė
Gintarė Korsakaitė	"Dreaming"	Raigardas Tautkus, Jokūbas Daubaris, Gabrielė Griciūtė, Raimondas J. Nabus
Girmantė Vaitkutė	"Time to Shine"	Vytautas Bikus
Glaam	"Love Is Freedom"	Jonny Rose
Ieva and Gabrielius	"I Fall in Love"	Raigardas Tautkus, Raimondas J. Nabus
Julija Jegorova	"I'll Carry You"	TJ Oosterhuis, Raphaella Mazaheri Asadi, Hiten Bharadia
Kvinta Loudside	"Toks gyvenimas"	Stanislavas Stavickis
Linas Adomaitis	"I W Tonight"	Linas Adomaitis, Bjorn Hansen
Monika Linkytė	"Baby Boy"	Dmitrij Šavrov
Multiks	"Crazy"	Paulius Burba
Mundis and Elvina	"Aš ilgiuosi tavęs"	Emanuel Gonzales
Neringa Šiaudikytė	"Used to Be"	Raigardas Tautkus
Nėrius Pečiūra	"Kas gali pakeisti gyvenimą"	Nėrius Pečiūra
Saulės Broliai	"Loreen"	Vytautas Bikus, Donatas Petreikis
Sepa and Asorti	"Money"	Edgaras Piščikas
Sophie	"Make It Happen"	Sophie, Einius Jarutis
Timohi	"Time for Life"	Timohi
Ugnė Smile	"Call to Your Mum"	Ugnė Kudlaitė, Giedrius Balčiūnas
Valery	"Taip noriu vėl"	Vytautas Karpauskas, Valerija Iljinaitė
Vincentas Linkevičius	"Dance the Night"	Mindaugas Lapinskas, Eglė Petrošiūtė
Vudis and Samanta Tīna	"Hey Chiki-Mama"	Arvydas Martinėnas, Gorgi

==== Jury members ====
The jury panel in all shows consisted of 20 members. Four of the members commented on the performances in the heats and the semi-finals, while seven of the members commented on the performances in the final.

Featured jury members by show
Jury member	Heats					Semi-finals		Final	Occupation(s)
Jury member	1	2	3	4	5	1	2	Final	Occupation(s)
Andrius Mamontovas	No	No	No	No	No	No	No	Yes	musician
Darius Užkuraitis	Yes	Yes	Yes	Yes	Yes	Yes	Yes	Yes	musicologist, Opus 3 director
Deivydas Zvonkus	Yes	No	No	Yes	Yes	No	No	No	composer
Donatas Montvydas	No	Yes	No	No	No	No	No	No	singer-songwriter
Povilas Meškėla	No	No	No	No	No	No	No	Yes	lead singer of the group Rojaus tūzai
Ramūnas Zilnys	Yes	Yes	Yes	No	Yes	Yes	Yes	Yes	journalist
Sasha Song	No	No	Yes	No	No	No	No	No	singer-songwriter
Saulius Urbonavičius	No	No	No	No	No	No	No	Yes	television and music producer
Vaidas Stackevičius	No	No	No	No	No	Yes	Yes	Yes	producer
Vytautas Miškinis	No	No	No	Yes	No	No	No	No	director of the "Ąžuoliukas" choir
Zita Kelmickaitė	Yes	Yes	Yes	Yes	Yes	Yes	Yes	Yes	musicologist

==== Heats ====
The five heats of the competition aired between 3 November and 1 December 2012 and featured the 39 competing entries. The top three entries from each heat advanced to the semi-finals, while the bottom entries were eliminated.

Following the first heat, "I'll Carry You" performed by Julija Jegorova was disqualified as the song had been publicly performed by German singer Onita Boone before 1 September 2012. On 6 December 2012, LRT announced the three entries that had received a wildcard to also proceed to the semi-finals.

Key

Qualifier Wildcard qualifier Entry disqualified

Heat 1 – 3 November 2012
R/O	Artist	Song	Jury	Televote		Total	Place
R/O	Artist	Song	Jury	Votes	Points	Total	Place
1	Vudis and Samanta Tīna	"Hey Chiki-Mama"	10	222	6	16	4
2	Vincentas Linkevičius	"Dance the Night"	6	285	8	14	5
3	Gabrielius Vagelis	"Sacrifice"	12	276	7	19	2
4	Ugnė Smile	"Call to Your Mum"	5	147	4	9	6
5	Saulės Broliai	"Loreen"	8	1,006	12	20	1
6	Valery	"Taip noriu vėl"	4	215	5	9	7
7	Andrius Pojavis	"Something"	7	411	10	17	3
8	~~Julija Jegorova~~	~~"I'll Carry You"~~	—	~~122~~	~~3~~	—	—

Heat 2 – 10 November 2012
R/O	Artist	Song	Jury	Televote		Total	Place
R/O	Artist	Song	Jury	Votes	Points	Total	Place
1	Alive Way	"Revolution"	7	314	6	13	5
2	Mundis and Elvina	"Aš ilgiuosi tavęs"	5	549	7	12	6
3	Giedrė Smolskaitė	"Stay Awake Tonight"	8	300	5	13	4
4	Nėrius Pečiūra	"Kas gali pakeisti gyvenimą"	3	121	4	7	8
5	Feliksas Merlin	"Silent Scream"	4	29	3	7	7
6	Ieva and Gabrielius	"I Fall in Love"	10	638	10	20	2
7	Timohi	"Time for Life"	6	966	12	18	3
8	Beissoul and Gabrielė Griciūtė	"Beautiful Life"	12	624	8	20	1

Heat 3 – 17 November 2012
R/O	Artist	Song	Jury	Televote		Total	Place
R/O	Artist	Song	Jury	Votes	Points	Total	Place
1	Multiks	"Crazy"	4	228	4	8	8
2	Eglė Jakštytė	"Give Me the Music"	7	298	5	12	6
3	Eden	"War Without End"	3	1,367	12	15	4
4	Elvina Milkauskaitė	"Closer"	5	931	10	15	3
5	Sophie	"Make It Happen"	8	654	6	14	5
6	Neringa Šiaudikytė	"Used to Be"	10	811	8	18	2
7	Berta Timinskaitė	"Missing You, Missing Me"	6	206	3	9	7
8	Božolė	"Happy and Free"	12	662	7	19	1

Heat 4 – 24 November 2012
R/O	Artist	Song	Jury	Televote		Total	Place
R/O	Artist	Song	Jury	Votes	Points	Total	Place
1	Freezing Kiss	"Nothing to Lose"	4	163	4	8	7
2	D'Oro	"Will You Recognize Me?"	5	231	5	10	6
3	Gintarė Korsakaitė	"Dreaming"	10	1,258	10	20	2
4	Linas Adomaitis	"I W Tonight"	12	1,320	12	24	1
5	Glaam	"Love Is Freedom"	6	414	6	12	5
6	Girmantė Vaitkutė	"Time to Shine"	8	912	7	15	3
7	Chill Out, Have No Doubt	"Time"	3	74	3	6	8
8	Gerai Gerai and Miss Sheep	"War in the Wardrobe"	7	1,195	8	15	4

Heat 5 – 1 December 2012
R/O	Artist	Song	Jury	Televote		Total	Place
R/O	Artist	Song	Jury	Votes	Points	Total	Place
1	Kvinta Loudside	"Toks gyvenimas"	5	110	5	10	6
2	Sepa and Asorti	"Money"	4	84	4	8	7
3	Al Bagdo	"Backdoor Superman"	6	304	7	13	5
4	Baiba Skurstene	"I'm on Fire"	7	262	6	13	4
5	El Fuego	"Ledo gabalėlis"	8	452	8	16	3
6	DAR	"Jump!"	10	1,743	12	22	2
7	Monika Linkytė	"Baby Boy"	12	1,133	10	22	1

==== Semi-finals ====
The two semi-finals of the competition aired on 8 and 15 December 2012 and featured nine entries each. The top four entries from each semi-final advanced to the final, while the bottom five were eliminated. Monika Linkytė, who advanced from the second semi-final, later withdrew from the competition due to a laryngitis infection.

Key

Qualifier Entry withdrawn

Semi-final 1 – 8 December 2012
R/O	Artist	Song	Jury	Televote		Total	Place
R/O	Artist	Song	Jury	Votes	Points	Total	Place
1	Gerai Gerai and Miss Sheep	"War in the Wardrobe"	12	1,712	12	24	1
2	Neringa Šiaudikytė	"Used to Be"	5	1,236	8	13	5
3	Gabrielius Vagelis	"Sacrifice"	6	270	3	9	7
4	Saulės Broliai	"Loreen"	4	239	2	6	9
5	Elvina Milkauskaitė	"Closer"	3	1,434	10	13	6
6	Andrius Pojavis	"Something"	7	1,129	6	13	4
7	Timohi	"Time for Life"	2	951	5	7	8
8	Ieva and Gabrielius	"I Fall in Love"	8	1,149	7	15	2
9	Božolė	"Happy and Free"	10	332	4	14	3

Semi-final 2 – 15 December 2012
R/O	Artist	Song	Jury	Televote		Total	Place
R/O	Artist	Song	Jury	Votes	Points	Total	Place
1	Beissoul and Gabrielė Griciūtė	"Beautiful Life"	8	1,535	6	14	5
2	~~Monika Linkytė~~	~~"Baby Boy"~~	~~7~~	~~1,965~~	~~8~~	~~15~~	~~4~~
3	Sophie	"Make It Happen"	4	333	4	8	7
4	Linas Adomaitis	"I W Tonight"	10	2,280	10	20	1
5	Girmantė Vaitkutė	"Time to Shine"	12	1,554	7	19	2
6	Gintarė Korsakaitė	"Dreaming"	3	1,016	5	8	8
7	El Fuego	"Ledo gabalėlis"	2	206	2	4	9
8	Giedrė Smolskaitė	"Stay Awake Tonight"	5	219	3	8	6
9	DAR	"Jump!"	6	2,686	12	18	3

==== Final ====
The final of the competition took place on 20 December 2012 and featured the remaining seven entries that qualified from the semi-finals. The final was the only show in the competition to be broadcast live; all other preceding shows were pre-recorded earlier in the week before their air dates. The winner was selected over two rounds of voting. In the first round, the three entries that gained the most points from the jury vote and the public vote advanced to the superfinal, while the bottom four were eliminated. In the superfinal, "Something" performed by Andrius Pojavis was selected as the winner after gaining the most points from the jurors. In addition to the performances of the competing entries, Pop Ladies and Šarka performed as the interval acts.

Final – 20 December 2012
R/O	Artist	Song	Jury	Televote		Total	Place
R/O	Artist	Song	Jury	Votes	Points	Total	Place
1	Božolė	"Happy and Free"	7	156	4	11	6
2	Ieva and Gabrielius	"I Fall in Love"	5	698	7	12	5
3	Gerai Gerai and Miss Sheep	"War in the Wardrobe"	8	971	12	20	2
4	Linas Adomaitis	"I W Tonight"	6	507	5	11	7
5	DAR	"Jump!"	4	877	10	14	4
6	Girmantė Vaitkutė	"Time to Shine"	10	563	6	16	3
7	Andrius Pojavis	"Something"	12	862	8	20	1

Superfinal – 20 December 2012
R/O	Artist	Song	Place
1	Gerai Gerai and Miss Sheep	"War in the Wardrobe"	3
2	Andrius Pojavis	"Something"	1
3	Girmantė Vaitkutė	"Time to Shine"	2

=== Preparation ===
On 10 February, LRT broadcast the support concert Būkime kartu, where Lithuanian viewers could call to donate funds to support the Lithuanian Eurovision participation. The concert featured guests Saulės Broliai, Monika Linkytė, Gerai Gerai and Miss Sheep, Donny Montell, Sasha Song, Pikaso, 4Fun, and Veronika Povilionienė, and raised over 30,000 LTL from the public donations.

=== Promotion ===
Andrius Pojavis specifically promoted "Something" as the Lithuanian Eurovision entry on 13 April 2013 by performing during the Eurovision in Concert event, which was held at the Melkweg venue in Amsterdam, Netherlands, and hosted by Marlayne and Linda Wagenmakers. In addition to his international appearance, on 31 March, Pojavis performed during the TV3 show Chorų karai.

== At Eurovision ==
According to Eurovision rules, all nations with the exceptions of the host country and the "Big Five" (France, Germany, Italy, Spain and the United Kingdom) are required to qualify from one of two semi-finals in order to compete for the final; the top ten countries from each semi-final progress to the final. The European Broadcasting Union (EBU) split up the competing countries into six different pots based on voting patterns from previous contests, with countries with favourable voting histories put into the same pot. On 17 January 2013, an allocation draw was held which placed each country into one of the two semi-finals, as well as which half of the show they would perform in. Lithuania was placed into the first semi-final, to be held on 14 May 2013, and was scheduled to perform in the second half of the show.

Once all the competing songs for the 2013 contest had been released, the running order for the semi-finals was decided by the shows' producers rather than through another draw, so that similar songs were not placed next to each other. Lithuania was set to perform in position 10, following the entry from Montenegro and before the entry from Belarus.

The two semi-finals and final were broadcast in Lithuania on LRT televizija and LRT Radijas with commentary by Darius Užkuraitis. The Lithuanian spokesperson who announced the Lithuanian votes during the final was Ignas Krupavičius.

=== Semi-final ===
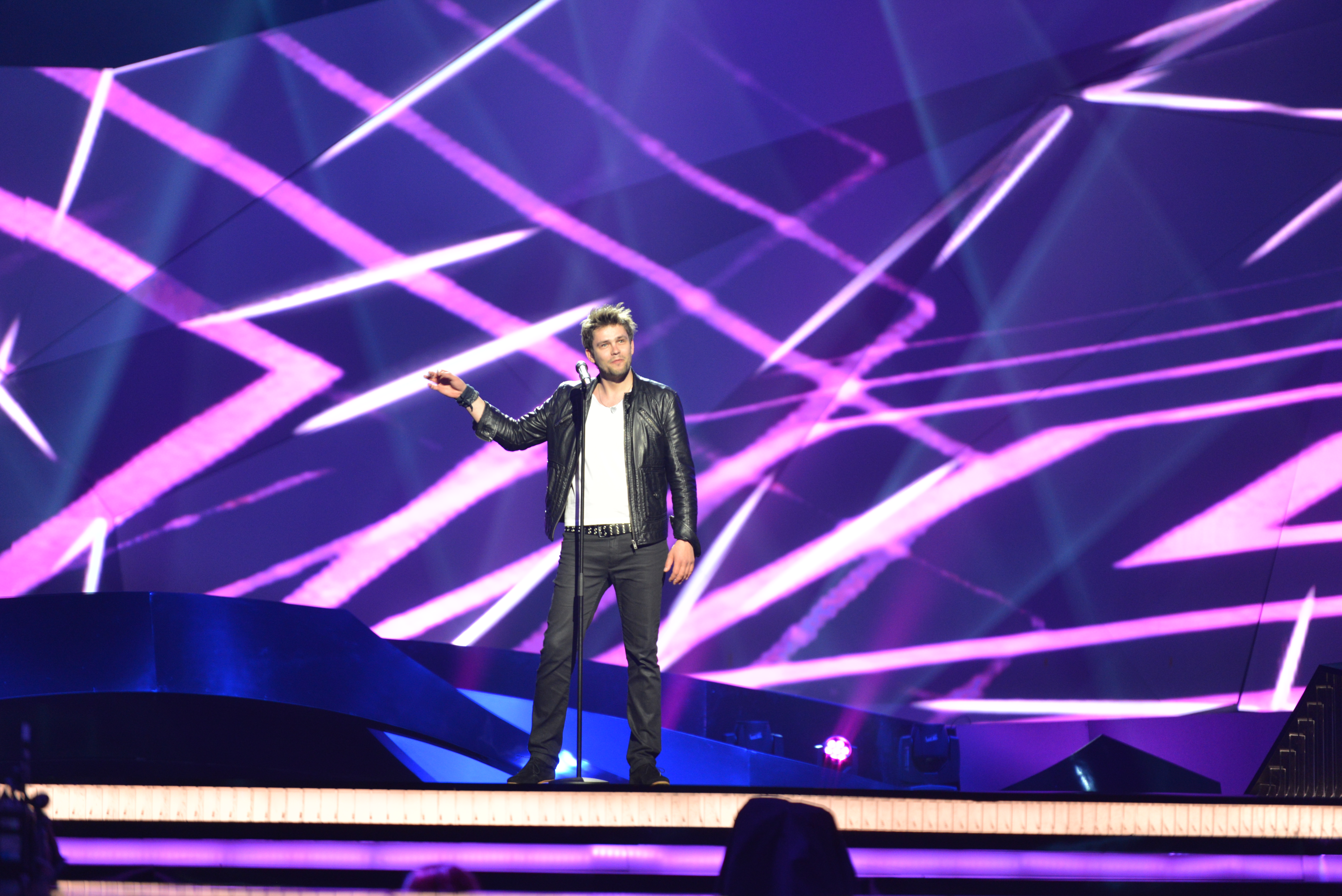
Andrius Pojavis during a rehearsal before the first semi-final

Andrius Pojavis took part in technical rehearsals on 7 and 10 May, followed by dress rehearsals on 13 and 14 May. This included the jury show on 13 May, where the professional juries of each country watched and voted on the competing entries.

The Lithuanian performance featured Andrius Pojavis performing on stage with purple stage colours and lighting. The performance focused on Pojavis gazing into the camera to convey the song's love message. Andrius Pojavis was joined by four backing vocalists: Anatolijus Oleinikas, Jurijus Veklenko, Martynas Puchovičius, and Monica Cikanovačiktė. Veklenko would go on to represent Lithuania in the Eurovision Song Contest 2019.

At the end of the show, Lithuania was announced as having finished in the top 10 and subsequently qualifying for the grand final. It was later revealed that Lithuania placed ninth in the semi-final, receiving a total of 53 points.

=== Final ===
Shortly after the first semi-final, a winners' press conference was held for the ten qualifying countries. As part of this press conference, the qualifying artists took part in a draw to determine which half of the grand final they would subsequently participate in. This draw was done in the order the countries appeared in the semi-final running order. Lithuania was drawn to compete in the first half. Following this draw, the shows' producers decided upon the running order of the final, as they had done for the semi-finals. Lithuania was subsequently placed to perform in position 2, following the entry from France and before the entry from Moldova.

Andrius Pojavis once again took part in dress rehearsals on 17 and 18 May before the final, including the jury final, where the professional juries cast their final votes before the live show. Andrius Pojavis performed a repeat of his semi-final performance during the final on 18 May. At the conclusion of the voting, Lithuania finished in twenty-second place with 17 points.

=== Voting ===
Voting during the three shows consisted of 50 percent public televoting and 50 percent from a jury deliberation. The jury consisted of five music industry professionals who were citizens of the country they represent. This jury was asked to judge each contestant based on: vocal capacity; the stage performance; the song's composition and originality; and the overall impression by the act. In addition, no member of a national jury could be related in any way to any of the competing acts in such a way that they cannot vote impartially and independently.

Following the release of the full split voting by the EBU after the conclusion of the competition, it was revealed that Lithuania had placed twenty-first with the public televote and twenty-fifth with the jury vote in the final. In the public vote, Lithuania received an average rank of 16.73, while with the jury vote, Lithuania received an average rank of 17.95. In the first semi-final, Lithuania placed fifth with the public televote, with an average rank of 7.44, and eleventh with the jury vote, with an average rank of 9.37.

Below is a breakdown of points awarded to Lithuania and awarded by Lithuania in the first semi-final and grand final of the contest. The nation awarded its 12 points to Ukraine in the semi-final and to Azerbaijan in the final of the contest.

==== Points awarded to Lithuania ====
Points awarded to Lithuania (Semi-final 1)
Score	Country
12 points	
10 points	Italy
8 points	
7 points	Belarus; United Kingdom
6 points	Belgium; Ireland
5 points	Ukraine
4 points	Estonia
3 points	Cyprus
2 points	Denmark; Moldova
1 point	Russia

Points awarded to Lithuania (Final)
Score	Country
12 points	
10 points	
8 points	
7 points	
6 points	Italy
5 points	Belarus
4 points	
3 points	Azerbaijan
2 points	
1 point	Georgia; Ireland; Ukraine

==== Points awarded by Lithuania ====
Points awarded by Lithuania (Semi-final 1)
Score	Country
12 points	Ukraine
10 points	Russia
8 points	Belarus
7 points	Netherlands
6 points	Denmark
5 points	Ireland
4 points	Estonia
3 points	Moldova
2 points	Belgium
1 point	Croatia

Points awarded by Lithuania (Final)
Score	Country
12 points	Azerbaijan
10 points	Ukraine
8 points	Georgia
7 points	Russia
6 points	Norway
5 points	Hungary
4 points	Netherlands
3 points	Estonia
2 points	Denmark
1 point	Belarus
