= I've Been Waiting for This Night =

2016 single by Donny Montell

Single by Donny Montell

from the album BLCK
- Released: 8 March 2016
- Genre: Pop
- Length: 3:05
- Label: UAB "Gyva Muzika"
- Songwriters: Jonas Thander; Beatrice Robertsson

Donny Montell singles chronology
"Don't Touch Me" (2016)	"I've Been Waiting for This Night" (2016)	"Screw Me Up" (2017)

Music video
- "I've Been Waiting for This Night" on YouTube

Eurovision Song Contest 2016 entry
- Country: Lithuania
- Artist: Donny Montell
- Language: English
- Composers: Jonas Thander, Beatrice Robertsson
- Lyricists: Jonas Thander, Beatrice Robertsson

Finals performance
- Semi-final result: 4th
- Semi-final points: 222
- Final result: 9th
- Final points: 200

Entry chronology
- ◄ "This Time" (2015)
- "Rain of Revolution" (2017) ►

Official performance video
- "I've Been Waiting for This Night" (Second Semi-Final) on YouTube "I've Been Waiting for This Night" (Grand Final) on YouTube

"I've Been Waiting for This Night" is a song performed by Lithuanian singer Donny Montell. The song, written by Jonas Thander and Beatrice Robertsson, represented Lithuania in the Eurovision Song Contest 2016 after winning "Eurovizijos" dainų konkurso nacionalinė atranka, Lithuania's national final for that year's Eurovision Song Contest.

== Eurovision Song Contest ==
=== "Eurovizijos" dainų konkurso nacionalinė atranka ===
"I've Been Waiting for This Night" performed by Donny Montell was selected as the Lithuanian entry for the Eurovision Song Contest 2016 through the national final "Eurovizijos" dainų konkurso nacionalinė atranka (English: "Eurovision" Song Contest national selection), organised by the Lithuanian public broadcaster Lithuanian National Radio and Television (LRT). The national final took place over ten weeks and involved 28 artists initially competing in two different competitive streams: artists that applied with a song and artists that were matched with a song from the song submissions LRT received because they did not have a song. Donny Montell applied to compete with "I've Been Waiting For This Night" and therefore competed with other artists who also applied with songs. The results of each show were determined by the combination of votes from a jury panel and a public vote. In the final on 12 March 2016, six artists and songs remained and "I've Been Waiting For This Night" was selected as the winner after achieving the highest score from both the jury panel and the public vote.

=== At Eurovision ===
According to Eurovision rules, all nations with the exceptions of the host country and the "Big Five" (France, Germany, Italy, Spain and the United Kingdom) are required to qualify from one of two semi-finals in order to compete for the final; the top ten countries from each semi-final progress to the final. The European Broadcasting Union (EBU) split up the competing countries into six different pots based on voting patterns from previous contests, with countries with favourable voting histories put into the same pot. On 25 January 2016, a special allocation draw was held which placed each country into one of the two semi-finals, as well as which half of the show they would perform in. Lithuania was placed into the second semi-final, to be held on 12 May 2016, and was scheduled to perform in the first half of the show.

The Lithuanian performance featured Donny Montell performing on stage alone with blue and green stage colours and the LED screens displaying stars. The performance also featured pyrotechnic effects and Montell using a trampoline prop to perform a jump. The stage director and choreographer for the Lithuanian performance was Sacha Jean-Baptiste. Donny Montell was joined by four off-stage backing vocalists: Justina Budaitė, Kotryna Juodzevičiūtė, Rasa Doniela and Karolina Rasten.

Montell performed the song during the second semi-final of the 2016 contest on 12 May, and ended up qualifying to the final on 14 May, held at the Ericsson Globe in Stockholm, Sweden. Montell qualified to the final on 14 May, and came 9th with a total of 200 points.

== Track listing ==
Digital download
No.	Title	Length
1.	"I've Been Waiting for This Night"	3:02
2.	"I've Been Waiting for This Night" (Trap Remix)	3:18
3.	"I've Been Waiting for This Night" (Club Remix)	3:39

== Charts ==
Chart (2016)	Peak position
Sweden Heatseekers (Sverigetopplistan)	4

== Release history ==
Region	Date	Format	Label
Worldwide	8 March 2016	Digital download	UAB "Gyva Muzika"
