= Mylėk =

Studio album by Vilija Matačiūnaitė
- Released: 27 October 2006
- Recorded: 2005–2006
- Genre: Pop; rock
- Length: 40 min
- Label: Hitas
- Producer: Modestas Karnaševičius

Vilija Matačiūnaitė chronology
Mylėk (2006)	Attention! (2014)

Singles from Mylėk
- 1. "Spjaudau Sau Ir Gaudau" Released: 2005; 2. "Kvailys" Released: 2005; 3. "Mylėk" Released: 2005; 4. "Alkana Širdis" Released: 2006; 5. "Žiogai" Released: 2006

Mylėk (eng. "love") is the debut studio album by Lithuanian singer Vilija Matačiūnaitė. The album was released on 27 October 2006 through the label Hitas.

In 2005, she achieved wide recognition by participating in the Eurovision Song Contest-preselection and in the first season of a successful local LNK television music competition franchise Kelias į žvaigždes, where she became the runner-up. In 2006 she also hosted in a national radio station "Lietus" and eventually promoted her debut album.

== Commercial performance ==
The album reached "platinum" status in Lithuania.

== Track listing ==
The album includes studio versions of seven songs, that were already performed in Kelias į žvaigždes. Five songs were new compositions.

No.	Title	Writer(s)	Length
1.	"Spjaudau ir gaudau (featuring Maxsas)"	Gintaro Zdepskio	3:43
2.	"Mylėk"	Zdepskio	3:16
3.	"Alkana Širdis"	Zdepskio	3:29
4.	"Žiogai"	Zdepskio	3:00
5.	"Kvailys"	Zdepskio	3:27
6.	"Vilko pilko nebijau"	Zdepskio	3:15
7.	"Dabar Geriausi Mūsų Vakarai (featuring Marijonas Mikutavičiu)"	Mikutavičiaus	3:21
8.	"Ei Na Na (featuring Donata, Mino, Vudis)"	Zdepskio	3:15
9.	"Prisimink Mane"	Vilija Matačiūnaitė, Zdepskio	3:23
10.	"Duok durniui kelią"	Zdepskio	3:12
11.	"Svyla padai"	Zdepsio	3:15
12.	"Ten"	Matačiūnaitė	3:15
