= Lithuania in the Eurovision Song Contest 2019 =

- Eurovision Song Contest 2019
- Country: Lithuania
- Selection process: "Eurovizijos" dainų konkurso nacionalinė atranka
- Selection date: 23 February 2019

Competing entry
- Song: "Run with the Lions"
- Artist: Jurij Veklenko
- Songwriters: Ashley Hicklin; Eric Lumiere; Pele Loriano

Placement
- Semi-final result: Failed to qualify (11th)

Participation chronology

Lithuania was represented at the Eurovision Song Contest 2019 with the song "Run with the Lions", written by Ashley Hicklin, Eric Lumiere, and Pele Loriano. The song was performed by Jurij Veklenko. The Lithuanian broadcaster Lithuanian National Radio and Television (LRT) organised the national final "Eurovizijos" dainų konkurso nacionalinė atranka (Eurovision Song Contest national selection) in order to select the Lithuanian entry for the 2019 contest in Tel Aviv, Israel. The national final took place over seven weeks and involved 49 competing entries. The results of each show were determined by the combination of votes from a jury panel and a public vote. In the final, eight artists and songs remained and "Run with the Lions", performed by Jurijus, was selected as the winner.

Lithuania was drawn to compete in the second semi-final of the Eurovision Song Contest which took place on 16 May 2019. Performing during the show in position 12, "Run with the Lions" was not announced among the top 10 entries of the second semi-final and therefore did not qualify to compete in the final. It was later revealed that Lithuania placed eleventh out of the 18 participating countries in the semi-final with 93 points.

== Background ==
Prior to the 2019 contest, Lithuania had participated in the Eurovision Song Contest nineteen times since its first entry in 1994. The nation's best placing in the contest was sixth, which it achieved in 2006 with the song "We Are the Winners", performed by LT United. Following the introduction of semi-finals for the 2004, Lithuania, to this point, had managed to qualify to the final nine times. In the 2018 contest, "When We're Old" performed by Ieva Zasimauskaitė qualified to the final, where the song scored 181 points and placed 12th.

For the 2019 contest, the Lithuanian national broadcaster, Lithuanian National Radio and Television (LRT), broadcast the event within Lithuania and organised the selection process for the nation's entry. Other than the internal selection of their debut entry in 1994, Lithuania has selected their entry consistently through a national final procedure. LRT confirmed their intentions to participate at the 2019 Eurovision Song Contest on 8 August 2018. On 10 October 2018, LRT announced the organization of "Eurovizijos" dainų konkurso nacionalinė atranka, which would be the national final to select Lithuania's entry for Tel Aviv.

== Before Eurovision ==
=== "Eurovizijos" dainų konkurso nacionalinė atranka ===
"Eurovizijos" dainų konkurso nacionalinė atranka (Eurovision Song Contest national selection) was the national final format developed by LRT in order to select Lithuania's entry for the Eurovision Song Contest 2019. The competition involved a seven-week-long process that commenced on 5 January 2019 and concluded with a winning song and artist on 23 February 2019. The seven shows were hosted by Gabrielė Martirosianaitė and Giedrius Masalskis and were broadcast on LRT televizija, LRT Lituanica, and LRT Radijas, as well as online via the broadcaster's website lrt.lt.

==== Format ====
The 2019 competition involved 49 entries and consisted of seven shows. The first to fourth shows were the heats, consisting of 11 to 13 entries each. The top six entries from each heat proceeded in the competition, with the remaining 24 entries participating in the fifth and sixth shows, which were the competition's semi-finals. Here, 12 entries participated in each show and the top four proceeded to the final. In the final, the winner was selected from the remaining eight entries. A monetary prize of €5,000 was also awarded to the winning songwriters by the Lithuanian Copyright Protection Association (LATGA) in order to encourage further development of the song in an aim to achieve international success.

The results of each of the seven shows were determined by the 50/50 combination of votes from a jury panel and public televoting. The ranking developed by both streams of voting was converted to points from 1-8, 10 and 12 and assigned based on the number of competing songs in the respective show. The public could vote through telephone and SMS voting. Ties in all shows were decided in favour of the entry that received the most points from the jury.

==== Competing entries ====
On 10 October 2018, LRT opened two separate submission forms: one for artists and another for songwriters to submit their songs. Artists that applied to compete with a song were required to indicate which song they wanted to compete with on their application. The submission deadline for both applications concluded on 10 December 2018. On 14 December 2018, LRT announced the 49 artists selected for the competition. Among the artists were previous Lithuanian Eurovision contestant Erica Jennings, who represented Lithuania in 2001 as part of SKAMP, Sasha Song, who represented the nation in 2009, and Jurgis Did, who represented the nation in 2010 as part of InCulto. The final changes to the list of 49 competing acts were later made with the addition of the group 120 to the list of performers, the addition of the song "Light On" for Monika Marija, and the withdrawal of singers Algirdas Daumantas Ciūnys, Emilija Valiukevičiūtė, Linas Jakštys, and Sasha Song and Dovilė.

Artist	Song	Songwriter(s)
120	"Nėra abejonių"	Deivydas Zvonkus, Dovydas Laukys, Šarūnas Januškevičius
Aldegunda	"I Want Your Love"	Gailė Asačiovaitė
Alen Chicco	"Your Cure"	Faustas Venckus, Tomas Alenčikas
Antikvariniai Kašpirovskio Dantys	"Mažulė"	Martynas Enčius
Banzzzai	"I Don't Care"	Martynas Puchovičius, Paulius Šinkūnas
Cheri	"Again"	Viktorija Vyšniauskaitė, Vitalij Puzyriov
Dagna Kondrotaitė	"The Rush"	Liutauras Janušaitis, Lionel Lombard
Donata and Bing Bang	"Doing the Loop"	Lise Cabble, Christopher Wortley, DWB
Edgaras Lubys	"To the Sky"	Edgaras Lubys
Elizabeth Olshey	"Never Enough (Of Your Love)"	Konstantin Beyrer, Elizabeth Olshey, Šarūnas Vaidachovičius
Emilija Gogolytė	"Riddle"	Sara Sangfelt, Ian Curnow, Ina Reni Alexandrow
Filtered Tools	"Survival"	Donatas Sabaliauskas, Eglė Tamulionienė
Gabriela Ždanovičiūtė	"Home Is in Your Heart"	Agnete Johnsen, Thomas Reil, Jeppe Reil, Christopher Wortley
Gabrielė Rybko	"Lay It Down"	Laurell Barker, Georgie Dennis, Cameron Warren
Gebrasy	"Acceptance"	Audrius Petrauskas, Alex Lipnevic, Jevgenij Podskokov
Giedrius Nakas	"Klaidos"	Giedrius Nakas
Glossarium	"Anyone"	Tadas Kaminskas, Lukas Gubanovas, Saulius Šivickas
Gražvydas Sidiniauskas	"Another Movie"	Andreas Sjo Engen, Janieck Devy, Radboud Miedema, Fabrizio Levita
Henry and Tommy Modric	"Neverpart"	Tomas Sinickis
Indrė Juodeikienė	"Bad Option"	Nácha, Rajan Muse, Koos Kamerling
Junà	"Strength of a Woman"	Donatas Montvydas, Gytis Valickas-Echoes, Glenda "Gizzle" Proby
Jurgis Brūzga	"Ctrl Alt Delete"	Kasparas Meginis, Edgaras Žaltauskas, Jurgis Brūzga, Andrius Kairys
Jurgis Did and Erica Jennings	"Sing!"	Jurgis Didžiulis, Erica Jennings
Jurijus	"Run with the Lions"	Ashley Hicklin, Eric Lumiere, Pele Loriano
Justina Žukauskaitė	"Hit Me Harder"	Vytautas Karpauskas, Justina Žukauskaitė
Kali	"Don't B3long"	Karolis Talutis, Arvydas Kriščikas
La forza	"Leisk tave paguosti"	Stanislovas Stavickis
Laimingu Būti Lengva	"Pasaulio vidury"	Audrius Pakšys
Lukas Bartaška	"River of Hope"	Lukas Bartaška, Giedrius Misiūnas
Mannazz	"Blind Bird"	Kamilė Kielaitė-Sienkievič, Dominykas Zalieckas
Matas Ligeika	"You Came Here to Fly"	Matas Ligeika, Gintarė Liseckaitė
Migloko	"Rožės"	Artūras Bieliauskas, Miglė Vilčiauskaitė
Monika Marija	"Criminal"	Benny Jansson, Monika Marija Paulauskaitė, Thomas Karlsson, Mahan Moin
Monika Marija	"Light On"	Rachel Suter, Monika Marija Paulauskaitė, Martin Wiik, Glen Eriksson
Original Copy	"Power of Sounds"	Ieva Ščerbinskaitė
Paola Hart	"I'll Be Alright"	Vitalij Rodevič, Paulina Paulauskaitė
Queens of Roses	"Runaway"	Edgaras Koldaras, Artiomas Penkevičius
Rūta	"Paradox"	Rūta Statkevičiūtė, Forest Blakk
Saulės kliošas	"Laiko mašina"	Alvydas Mačiulskas, Laurynas Šarkinas, Justė Starinskaitė
Simona	"This Day Begins with Love"	Kęstutis Jablonskis, Raimundas Margalikas
Sofija Eitutytė	"My 7th Life"	Florian Buba, Charlie Mason, Rike Boomgaarden, Marcus Brosch
Soliaris and Foreign Souls	"Song of My Life"	Viktoras Alechnovicius, Artūras Daunys, Algimantas Minalga, Arminas Bagdzevičius
Šarūnas Mačiulis	"Traukinys"	Šarūnas Mačiulis
Tiramisu	"The Smell of Your Eyes"	Martyna Rudelytė, Egidijus Lisovoj
Twosome	"1000"	Paulius Šinkūnas, Justinas Stanislovaitis
Valdas Lacko	"Dare"	Niklas Bergqvist, Simon Johansson, Malin Bergqvist
Valerija Iljinaitė	"Scars Are Beautiful"	Ylva Persson, Linda Persson, Charlie Mason, John Matthews, Kaspars Ansons
Voldemars Petersons	"Dancing with the Stars"	Ashley Hicklin, Becky Jerams, Christopher Wortley
Živilė Gedvilaitė	"Learn from Your Love"	Anna Timgren, Alex Mullarkey

==== Jury members ====
The jury panel consisted of three members in the heats and the first semi-final, four members in the second semi-final, and seven members in the final.

Jury members by show
Jury member	Heats				Semi-finals		Final	Occupation(s)
Jury member	1	2	3	4	1	2	Final	Occupation(s)
Arnoldas Lukošius	No	No	No	No	Yes	No	No	musician
Darius Užkuraitis	No	No	No	No	No	No	Yes	LRT Opus director
Deivydas Zvonkus	No	No	No	No	No	Yes	No	composer
Giedrė Kilčiauskienė	No	Yes	No	No	No	No	No	singer, vocalist for the band Pieno lazeriai
Ieva Narkutė	No	No	No	No	No	Yes	No	singer
Jonas Nainys	Yes	No	No	No	No	No	Yes	DJ, radio host, producer
Julija Ritčik	No	No	No	No	Yes	No	No	singer, representative of LATGA
Jurga Šeduikytė	No	No	No	Yes	No	No	No	singer
Leonas Somovas	No	No	Yes	No	No	No	Yes	producer
Mykolas Katkus	No	No	No	No	No	No	Yes	public relations specialist, lead singer of the band Tha Station
Ramūnas Zilnys	Yes	Yes	Yes	Yes	Yes	Yes	Yes	music reviewer
Rasa Bubulytė	No	Yes	No	No	No	No	No	singer
Sigutė Stonytė	No	No	No	No	No	Yes	No	opera singer, vocal teacher
Simona Albavičiūtė-Bandita	No	No	No	No	No	No	Yes	radio and television presenter
Vilius Alesius	No	No	No	Yes	No	No	No	member of the band Skamp, representative of LATGA
Vytautas Bikus	Yes	No	No	No	No	No	Yes	composer, council member of AGATA
Vytautas Rumšas Jr.	No	No	Yes	No	No	No	No	actor, director

==== Shows ====
===== Heats =====
The four heats of the competition aired between 5 January and 2 February 2019, and featured the 49 competing entries. The top six entries advanced to the semi-finals from each heat, while the bottom entries were eliminated.

Before the broadcast of the fourth heat, Gabrielė Rybko was disqualified due to breaking the twenty-eighth selection rule of the competition in regards to the fairness of the televote. However, her recorded performance was still part of the show.

Heat 1 – 5 January 2019
R/O	Artist	Song	Jury	Televote		Total	Place
R/O	Artist	Song	Jury	Votes	Points	Total	Place
1	Matas Ligeika	"You Came Here to Fly"	5	473	4	9	8
2	Simona	"This Day Begins with Love"	0	157	0	0	12
3	Filtered Tools	"Survival"	4	267	2	6	9
4	Rūta	"Paradox"	0	341	3	3	10
5	Šarūnas Mačiūlis	"Traukinys"	3	686	8	11	6
6	Aldegunda	"I Want Your Love"	3	828	12	15	3
7	Gabriela Ždanovičiūtė	"Home Is in Your Heart"	1	223	0	1	11
8	Migloko	"Rožės"	12	639	7	19	2
9	Twosome	"1000"	7	633	6	13	4
10	Mannazz	"Blind Bird"	10	792	10	20	1
11	Gebrasy	"Acceptance"	8	257	1	9	7
12	Glossarium	"Anyone"	6	603	5	11	5

Heat 2 – 19 January 2019
R/O	Artist	Song	Jury	Televote		Total	Place
R/O	Artist	Song	Jury	Votes	Points	Total	Place
1	Tiramisu	"The Smell of Your Eyes"	0	824	8	8	7
2	Giedrius Nakas	"Klaidos"	4	198	0	4	11
3	Justina Žukauskaitė	"Hit Me Harder"	2	474	4	6	9
4	Lukas Bartaška	"River of Hope"	8	592	6	14	4
5	Paola Hart	"I'll Be Alright"	8	224	0	8	6
6	Valdas Lacko	"Dare"	0	295	3	3	12
7	Emilija Gogolytė	"Riddle"	6	880	10	16	2
8	Edgaras Lubys	"To the Sky"	10	1,007	12	22	1
9	Donata and Bing Bang	"Doing the Loop"	1	517	5	6	10
10	Gražvydas Sidiniauskas	"Another Movie"	5	260	1	6	8
11	Junà	"Strength of a Woman"	12	407	2	14	3
12	Banzzzai	"I Don't Care"	0	250	0	0	13
13	Original Copy	"Power of Sounds"	3	603	7	10	5

Heat 3 – 26 January 2019
R/O	Artist	Song	Jury	Televote		Total	Place
R/O	Artist	Song	Jury	Votes	Points	Total	Place
1	Laimingu Būti Lengva	"Pasaulio vidury"	0	149	0	0	12
2	Voldemars Petersons	"Dancing with the Stars"	2	227	0	2	11
3	La forza	"Leisk tave paguosti"	0	146	0	0	13
4	Sofija Eitutytė	"My 7th Life"	3	302	1	4	8
5	Antikvariniai Kašpirovskio Dantys	"Mažulė"	6	906	7	13	4
6	Dagna	"The Rush"	4	739	6	10	7
7	Jurgis Brūzga	"Ctrl Alt Delete"	5	663	5	10	6
8	Kali	"Don't B3long"	2	308	2	4	9
9	Cheri	"Again"	8	409	3	11	5
10	120	"Nėra abejonių"	0	548	4	4	10
11	Monika Marija	"Criminal"	10	978	8	18	2
12	Jurijus	"Run with the Lions"	12	1,533	12	24	1
13	Jurgis Did and Erica Jennings	"Sing!"	8	1,077	10	18	3

Heat 4 – 2 February 2019
R/O	Artist	Song	Jury	Televote		Total	Place
R/O	Artist	Song	Jury	Votes	Points	Total	Place
1	Valerija Iljinaitė	"Scars Are Beautiful"	2	242	1	3	10
2	Indrė Juodeikienė	"Bad Option"	1	375	2	3	11
3	Alen Chicco	"Your Cure"	4	745	8	12	6
4	Queens of Roses	"Runaway"	7	580	4	11	7
5	Živilė Gedvilaitė	"Learn from Your Love"	7	643	5	12	5
6	Elizabeth Olshey	"Never Enough (Of Your Love)"	0	669	6	6	8
7	Gabrielė Rybko	"Lay It Down"	3	0	0	3	9
8	Saulės kliošas	"Laiko mašina"	10	527	3	13	4
9	Soliaris and Foreign Souls	"Song of My Life"	7	694	7	14	3
10	Monika Marija	"Light On"	12	1,416	12	24	1
11	Henry and Tommy Modric	"Neverpart"	8	838	10	18	2

===== Semi-finals =====
The two semi-finals of the competition took place on 9 and 16 February 2019 and featured twelve competing entries each. The top four entries from each semi-final advanced to the final, while the bottom eight were eliminated.

On 21 February 2019, Monika Marija withdrew one of her two songs "Criminal", which placed third in the second semi-final, after clarifying that she only wanted to compete with her other song "Light On" in the final. The song "Your Cure", performed by Alen Chicco, which placed fifth in the second semi-final, replaced the withdrawn song and advanced to the final.

Key

Qualifier Entry withdrawn

Semi-final 1 – 9 February 2019
R/O	Artist	Song	Jury	Televote		Total	Place
R/O	Artist	Song	Jury	Votes	Points	Total	Place
1	Emilija Gogolytė	"Riddle"	1	1,694	10	11	5
2	Henry and Tommy Modric	"Neverpart"	7	1,171	7	14	4
3	Saulės kliošas	"Laiko mašina"	5	535	2	7	9
4	Edgaras Lubys	"To the Sky"	4	994	6	10	7
5	Glossarium	"Anyone"	0	506	1	1	11
6	Migloko	"Rožės"	7	665	3	10	6
7	Twosome	"1000"	0	286	0	0	12
8	Lukas Bartaška	"River of Hope"	2	1,410	8	10	8
9	Junà	"Strength of a Woman"	10	786	4	14	3
10	Monika Marija	"Light On"	12	3,192	12	24	1
11	Jurgis Brūzga	"Ctrl Alt Delete"	10	815	5	15	2
12	Cheri	"Again"	4	442	0	4	10

Semi-final 2 – 16 February 2019
R/O	Artist	Song	Jury	Televote		Total	Place
R/O	Artist	Song	Jury	Votes	Points	Total	Place
1	Original Copy	"Power of Sounds"	3	335	1	4	10
2	Živilė Gedvilaitė	"Learn from Your Love"	0	231	0	0	12
3	Šarūnas Mačiūlis	"Traukinys"	0	1,209	5	5	9
4	Paola Hart	"I'll Be Alright"	2	224	0	2	11
5	Alen Chicco	"Your Cure"	6	1,415	6	12	5
6	Aldegunda	"I Want Your Love"	1	1,191	4	5	8
7	Soliaris and Foreign Souls	"Song of My Life"	4	413	2	6	7
8	~~Monika Marija~~	~~"Criminal"~~	~~10~~	~~1,519~~	~~7~~	~~17~~	~~3~~
9	Antikvariniai Kašpirovskio Dantys	"Mažulė"	10	1,979	8	18	2
10	Jurijus	"Run with the Lions"	12	4,097	12	24	1
11	Mannazz	"Blind Bird"	5	628	3	8	6
12	Jurgis Did and Erica Jennings	"Sing!"	7	2,020	10	17	4

===== Final =====
The final of the competition took place on 23 February 2019 and featured the remaining eight entries that qualified from the semi-finals. "Run with the Lions", performed by Jurijus, was selected as the winner after gaining the most points from both the jury vote and the public vote. In addition to the performances of the competing entries, interval acts included Moniqué and Mantas performing the song "Ateities žmogus", Ieva Zasimauskaitė performing the 2018 Lithuanian Eurovision entry "When We're Old", and Carousel performing the 2019 Latvian Eurovision entry "That Night".

Final – 23 February 2019
R/O	Artist	Song	Jury	Televote		Total	Place
R/O	Artist	Song	Jury	Votes	Points	Total	Place
1	Alen Chicco	"Your Cure"	6	2,980	6	12	5
2	Junà	"Strength of a Woman"	3	691	3	6	8
3	Henry and Tommy Modric	"Neverpart"	5	1,186	5	10	6
4	Jurgis Brūzga	"Ctrl Alt Delete"	4	936	4	8	7
5	Jurgis Did and Erica Jennings	"Sing!"	7	14,912	7	14	4
6	Monika Marija	"Light On"	10	20,977	10	20	2
7	Antikvariniai Kašpirovskio Dantys	"Mažulė"	8	15,699	8	16	3
8	Jurijus	"Run with the Lions"	12	24,694	12	24	1

=== Preparation ===
Jurij Veklenko traveled to Switzerland to work on a revamped version of "Run with the Lions" with composers Eric Lumiere and Pele Loriano following his win during the Lithuanian national final. The revamped version was released on 3 April 2019.

=== Promotion ===
Jurij Veklenko made several appearances across Europe to specifically promote "Run with the Lions" as the Lithuanian Eurovision entry. On 6 April, Veklenko performed during the Eurovision in Concert event, which was held at the AFAS Live venue in Amsterdam, Netherlands, and hosted by Edsilia Rombley and Marlayne. On 14 April, Veklenko performed during the London Eurovision Party, which was held at the Café de Paris venue in London, United Kingdom, and hosted by Nicki French and Paddy O'Connell. On 21 April, Veklenko performed during the Eurovision Pre-Party Madrid event, which was held at the Sala La Riviera venue in Madrid, Spain, and hosted by Tony Aguilar and Julia Varela.

== At Eurovision ==
According to Eurovision rules, all nations with the exceptions of the host country and the "Big Five" (France, Germany, Italy, Spain and the United Kingdom) are required to qualify from one of two semi-finals in order to compete for the final; the top ten countries from each semi-final progress to the final. The European Broadcasting Union (EBU) split up the competing countries into six different pots based on voting patterns from previous contests, with countries with favourable voting histories put into the same pot. On 28 January 2019, an allocation draw was held which placed each country into one of the two semi-finals, as well as which half of the show they would perform in. Lithuania was placed into the second semi-final, to be held on 16 May 2019, and was scheduled to perform in the second half of the show.

Once all the competing songs for the 2019 contest had been released, the running order for the semi-finals was decided by the shows' producers rather than through another draw, so that similar songs were not placed next to each other. Lithuania was set to perform in position 12, following the entry from Malta and before the entry from Russia.

The two semi-finals and final were broadcast in Lithuania on LRT and LRT Radijas, with commentary by Darius Užkuraitis and Gerūta Griniūtė. The Lithuanian spokesperson who announced the top 12-point score awarded by the Lithuanian jury during the final was Giedrius Masalskis; Andrius Mamontovas was initially appointed to be the spokesperson of Lithuania, but was not able to perform the role because he was a member of the jury.

=== Semi-final ===
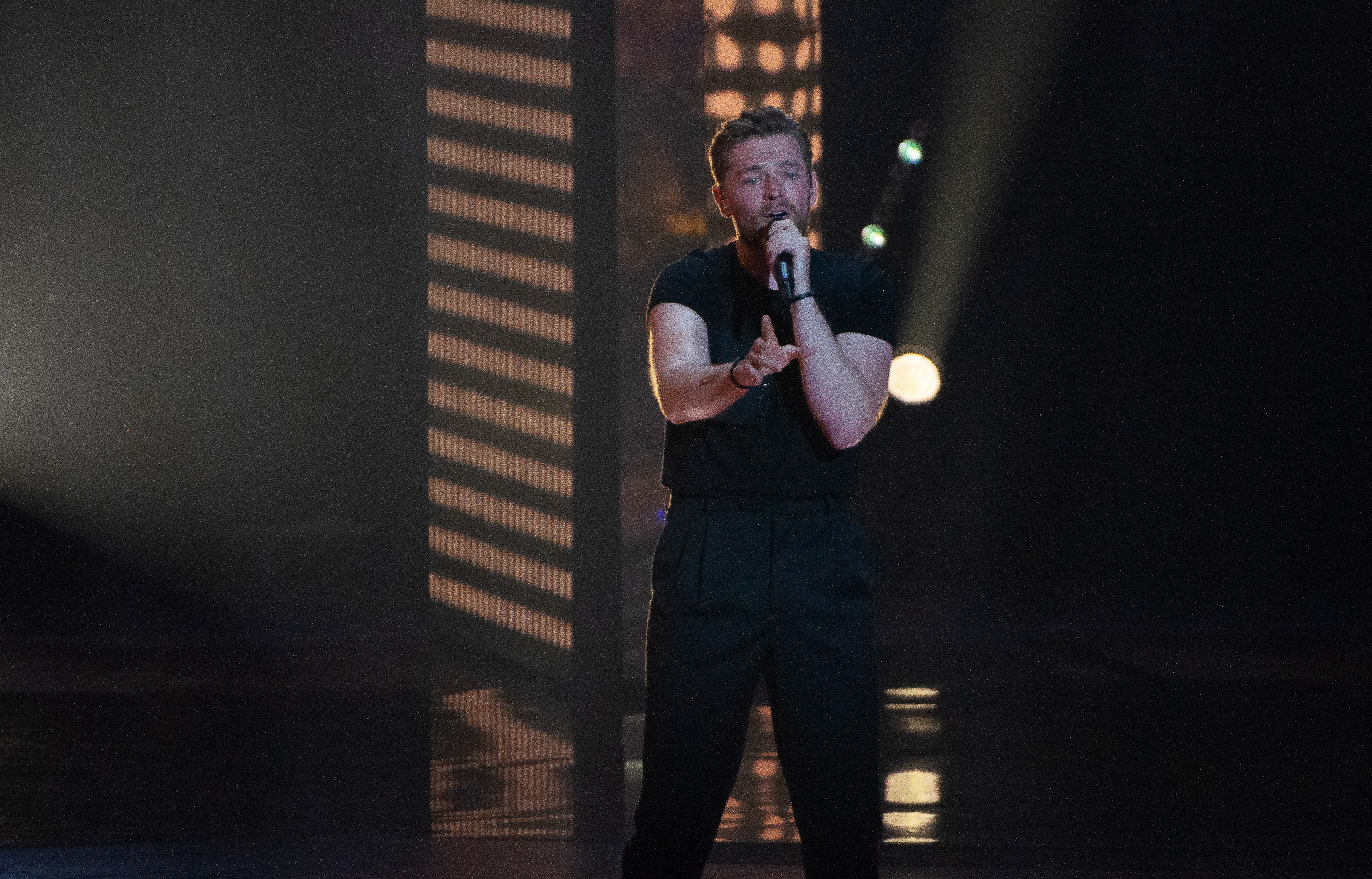
Jurij Veklenko during a rehearsal before the second semi-final

Jurij Veklenko took part in technical rehearsals on 7 and 11 May, followed by dress rehearsals on 15 and 16 May. This included the jury show on 15 May, where the professional juries of each country watched and voted on the competing entries.

The Lithuanian performance featured Jurij Veklenko in a black outfit and performing on stage alone with the LED screens displaying gold and red spots as well as imagery of people running. The stage director for the Lithuanian performance was Povilas Varvuolis. Jurij Veklenko was also joined by five off-stage backing vocalists: Algė Matekūnaitė, Berta Timinskaitė, Eglė Gadeikytė, Justina Budaitė, and Silvija Pankėnaitė.

At the end of the show, Lithuania was not announced among the top 10 entries in the second semi-final and therefore failed to qualify to compete in the final. It was later revealed that Lithuania placed eleventh in the semi-final, receiving a total of 93 points: 77 points from the televoting and 16 points from the juries.

=== Voting ===
Voting during the three shows involved each country awarding two sets of points from 1–8, 10 and 12: one from their professional jury and the other from televoting. Each nation's jury consisted of five music industry professionals who are citizens of the country they represent, with their names published before the contest to ensure transparency. This jury judged each entry based on: vocal capacity; the stage performance; the song's composition and originality; and the overall impression by the act. In addition, no member of a national jury was permitted to be related in any way to any of the competing acts in such a way that they cannot vote impartially and independently. The individual rankings of each jury member as well as the nation's televoting results will be released shortly after the grand final.

Below is a breakdown of points awarded to Lithuania and awarded by Lithuania in the second semi-final and grand final of the contest, and the breakdown of the jury voting and televoting conducted during the two shows:

==== Points awarded to Lithuania ====
Points awarded to Lithuania (Semi-final 2)
Score	Televote	Jury
12 points	Ireland; Norway; United Kingdom	
10 points	Latvia	
8 points		
7 points	Sweden	
6 points		Latvia
5 points	Albania; Moldova	
4 points	Denmark	
3 points	Malta	Malta; Sweden; Switzerland
2 points	Azerbaijan; Netherlands	
1 point	Germany; Russia; Switzerland	Azerbaijan

==== Points awarded by Lithuania ====
Points awarded by Lithuania (Semi-final 2)
Score	Televote	Jury
12 points	Latvia	Netherlands
10 points	Russia	Sweden
8 points	Norway	Azerbaijan
7 points	Azerbaijan	Latvia
6 points	Netherlands	Austria
5 points	Sweden	Switzerland
4 points	Switzerland	Russia
3 points	Denmark	Malta
2 points	North Macedonia	North Macedonia
1 point	Malta	Norway

Points awarded by Lithuania (Final)
Score	Televote	Jury
12 points	Russia	Netherlands
10 points	Italy	Azerbaijan
8 points	Norway	Sweden
7 points	Netherlands	Czech Republic
6 points	Iceland	Iceland
5 points	Azerbaijan	Germany
4 points	Estonia	Slovenia
3 points	Sweden	Italy
2 points	Switzerland	Australia
1 point	Australia	Russia

==== Detailed voting results ====
The following members comprised the Lithuanian jury:

- Vytautas Bikus (jury chairperson) – composer
- Andrius Mamontovas – singer, composer, lyricist, represented Lithuania in the 2006 contest as part of LT United
- Jurgis Brūzga – singer
- Girmantė Vaitkutė – singer, songwriter
- Gerūta Griniūtė – TV & radio host

Detailed voting results from Lithuania (Semi-final 2)
R/O	Country	Jury							Televote	
R/O	Country	V. Bikus	A. Mamontovas	J. Brūzga	G. Vaitkutė	G. Griniūtė	Rank	Points	Rank	Points
01	Armenia	11	9	14	11	10	13		14	
02	Ireland	13	17	15	14	17	17		13	
03	Moldova	12	16	17	12	11	15		15	
04	Switzerland	7	12	7	4	6	6	5	7	4
05	Latvia	4	4	6	3	4	4	7	1	12
06	Romania	8	15	8	9	9	11		11	
07	Denmark	14	10	16	13	13	14		8	3
08	Sweden	3	2	2	2	1	2	10	6	5
09	Austria	6	11	4	7	7	5	6	16	
10	Croatia	15	13	12	16	15	16		12	
11	Malta	9	14	10	8	5	8	3	10	1
12	Lithuania									
13	Russia	5	7	5	10	16	7	4	2	10
14	Albania	17	5	13	17	8	12		17	
15	Norway	16	3	11	15	12	10	1	3	8
16	Netherlands	1	1	1	1	3	1	12	5	6
17	North Macedonia	10	8	9	5	14	9	2	9	2
18	Azerbaijan	2	6	3	6	2	3	8	4	7

Detailed voting results from Lithuania (Final)
R/O	Country	Jury							Televote	
R/O	Country	V. Bikus	A. Mamontovas	J. Brūzga	G. Vaitkutė	G. Griniūtė	Rank	Points	Rank	Points
01	Malta	14	17	15	17	14	19		19	
02	Albania	22	12	23	24	16	21		25	
03	Czech Republic	1	11	4	8	6	4	7	15	
04	Germany	5	10	8	6	8	6	5	22	
05	Russia	8	18	9	5	18	10	1	1	12
06	Denmark	15	9	21	18	19	17		13	
07	San Marino	11	13	26	26	26	20		12	
08	North Macedonia	20	19	11	11	9	15		21	
09	Sweden	4	5	3	2	1	3	8	8	3
10	Slovenia	9	4	14	13	4	7	4	11	
11	Cyprus	21	26	13	22	23	22		18	
12	Netherlands	2	1	1	1	2	1	12	4	7
13	Greece	19	16	25	21	25	23		23	
14	Israel	26	24	22	25	17	25		20	
15	Norway	17	3	20	20	20	11		3	8
16	United Kingdom	18	15	7	14	22	16		26	
17	Iceland	7	7	5	9	5	5	6	5	6
18	Estonia	10	14	17	16	7	13		7	4
19	Belarus	23	21	24	23	21	26		14	
20	Azerbaijan	3	2	2	3	3	2	10	6	5
21	France	24	25	12	15	12	18		16	
22	Italy	13	8	6	7	10	8	3	2	10
23	Serbia	16	23	19	4	15	12		24	
24	Switzerland	12	20	10	12	11	14		9	2
25	Australia	6	6	16	10	13	9	2	10	1
26	Spain	25	22	18	19	24	24		17	
