= Jurijus Veklenko =

Jurijus
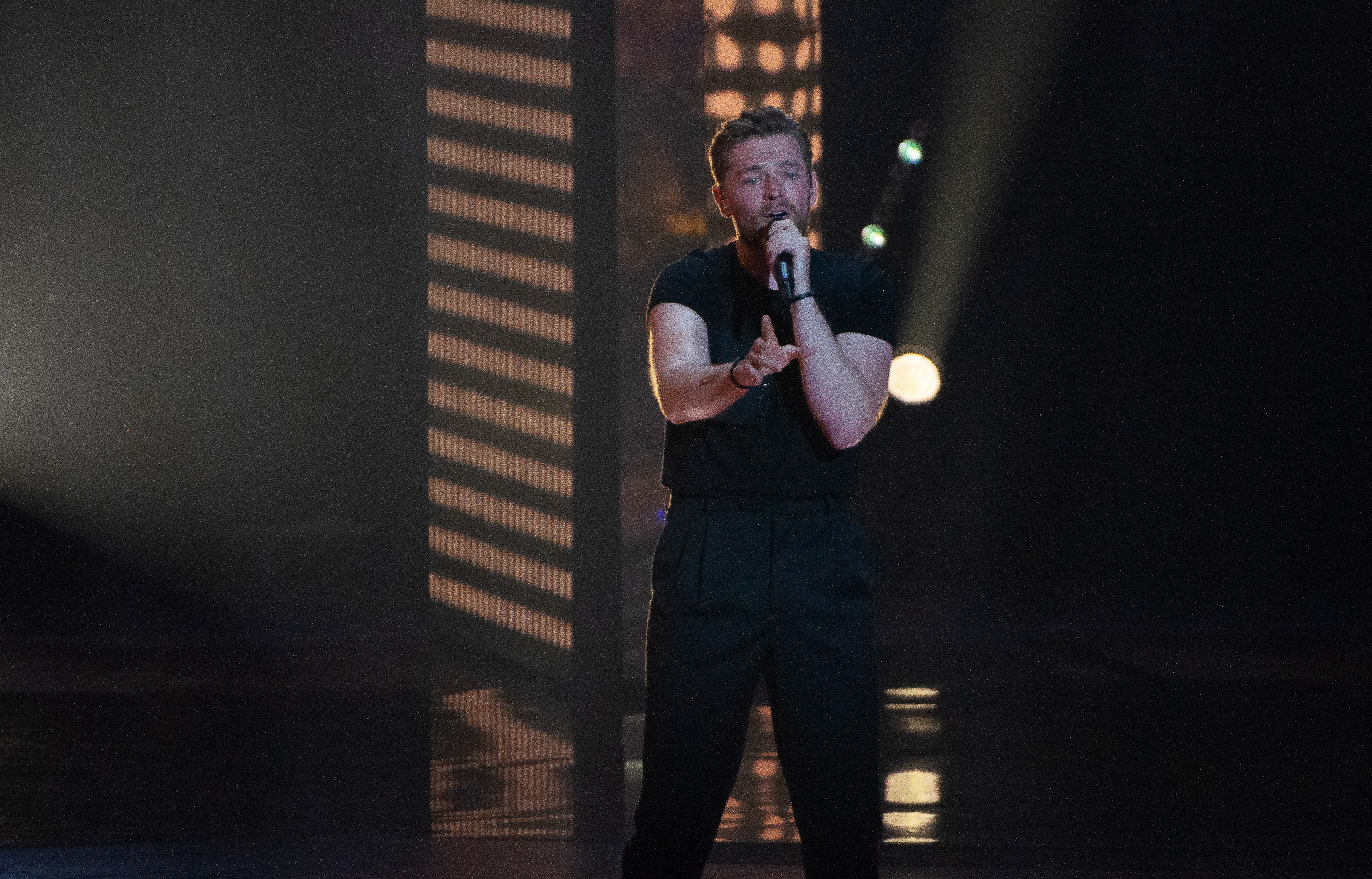
- Jurijus performing at the Eurovision Song Contest 2019 in Tel Aviv.

Background information
- Born: 6 July 1990 (age 35)
- Origin: Klaipėda, Lithuania
- Occupations: Musician, singer-songwriter
- Instrument: Vocals
- Years active: 2014–present

Jurijus Veklenko (born 6 July 1990 in Klaipėda), also known as Jurij Veklenko or simply Jurijus, is a Lithuanian singer.

== Eurovision Song Contest ==
Veklenko previously performed at the Eurovision Song Contest 2015 as one of the backing singers for Monika Linkytė and Vaidas Baumila in their performance of "This Time"; along with the three other backing singers, Jurijus took part in a same-sex kiss as part of the final performance.

In 2017, Veklenko performed the main vocal for lip-sync drag-act Lolita Zero, in her Lithuanian national final entry "Get Frighten".

Veklenko won the 2019 Lithuanian national final with the song "Run with the Lions", and represented his country at the Eurovision Song Contest 2019 in Tel Aviv.

== Personal life ==
Veklenko works for a major engineering firm mainly with IT and has said he enjoys the contrast with his musical career. He is of Ukrainian descent.

== Discography ==
=== Studio albums ===
Title	Details	Peak chart positions
Title	Details	LTU
Mano Sapnuose	Released: May 13, 2019; Format: Digital download, CD	11

=== Singles ===
Year	Title	Peak chart positions	Album
Year	Title	LTU	Album
2018	"Kartais"	—	Mano Sapnuose
2019	"Run with the Lions"	29	Mano Sapnuose
2019	"Skirtingi Pasauliai" (with Inga Jankauskaitė)	—	Mano Sapnuose

Awards and achievements
Preceded by Ieva Zasimauskaitė with "When We're Old"	Lithuania in the Eurovision Song Contest; 2019	Succeeded by The Roop with "On Fire"
