= Lithuania in the Eurovision Song Contest 2018 =

- Eurovision Song Contest 2018
- Country: Lithuania
- Selection process: "Eurovizijos" dainų konkurso nacionalinė atranka
- Selection date: 11 March 2018

Competing entry
- Song: "When We're Old"
- Artist: Ieva Zasimauskaitė
- Songwriters: Vytautas Bikus

Placement
- Semi-final result: Qualified (9th, 119 points)
- Final result: 12th, 181 points

Participation chronology

Lithuania was represented at the Eurovision Song Contest 2018 with the song "When We're Old", written by Vytautas Bikus. The song was performed by Ieva Zasimauskaitė. The Lithuanian broadcaster Lithuanian National Radio and Television (LRT) organised the national final "Eurovizijos" dainų konkurso nacionalinė atranka (Eurovision Song Contest national selection) in order to select the Lithuanian entry for the 2018 contest in Lisbon, Portugal. The national final took place over nine weeks and involved 50 competing entries. The results of each show were determined by the combination of votes from a jury panel and a public vote. In the final, six artists and songs remained and "When We're Old", performed by Ieva Zasimauskaitė, was selected as the winner.

Lithuania was drawn to compete in the first semi-final of the Eurovision Song Contest which took place on 8 May 2018. Performing during the show in position 6, "When We're Old" was announced among the top 10 entries of the first semi-final and therefore qualified to compete in the final on 12 May. It was later revealed that Lithuania placed ninth out of the 19 participating countries in the semi-final with 119 points. In the final, Lithuania performed in position 4 and placed 12th out of the 26 participating countries, scoring 181 points.

== Background ==
Prior to the 2018 contest, Lithuania had participated in the Eurovision Song Contest 18 times since its first entry in 1994. The nation's best placing in the contest was sixth, which it achieved in 2006 with the song "We Are the Winners", performed by LT United. Following the introduction of semi-finals for the 2004, Lithuania, to this point, had managed to qualify to the final eight times. In the 2017 contest, "Rain of Revolution", performed by Fusedmarc, failed to qualify for the final.

For the 2018 contest, the Lithuanian national broadcaster, Lithuanian National Radio and Television (LRT), broadcast the event within Lithuania and organised the selection process for the nation's entry. Other than the internal selection of their debut entry in 1994, Lithuania has selected their entry consistently through a national final procedure. LRT confirmed their intentions to participate at the 2018 Eurovision Song Contest on 14 August 2017. On 17 October 2017, LRT announced the organization of "Eurovizijos" dainų konkurso nacionalinė atranka, which would be the national final to select Lithuania's entry for Lisbon.

== Before Eurovision ==
=== "Eurovizijos" dainų konkurso nacionalinė atranka ===
"Eurovizijos" dainų konkurso nacionalinė atranka (Eurovision Song Contest national selection) was the national final format developed by LRT in order to select Lithuania's entry for the Eurovision Song Contest 2018. The competition involved a nine-week-long process that commenced on 6 January 2018 and concluded with a winning song and artist on 11 March 2018. The nine shows were hosted by Mantas Stonkus and Ugnė Skonsmanaitė and were broadcast on LRT televizija, LRT Lituanica, and LRT Radijas, as well as online via the broadcaster's website lrt.lt.

==== Format ====
The 2018 competition involved 50 entries and consisted of nine shows. The first four shows consisted of 12 or 13 entries each, and resulted in the elimination of 26 entries all together. The remaining 24 entries participated in the fifth and sixth shows, consisting of 12 entries each. Six entries advanced from each show, while a public online repechage vote selected an additional two entries to advance among the 12 eliminated acts. The seventh and eighth show were the competition's semi-final, where seven entries participated in each show and the top three proceeded to the final. In the final, the winner was selected from the remaining six entries.

The results of each of the nine shows were determined by the 50/50 combination of votes from a jury panel and public televoting. The ranking developed by both streams of voting was converted to points from 1-8, 10 and 12 and assigned based on the number of competing songs in the respective show. The public could vote through telephone and SMS voting. Ties in all shows but the final were decided in favour of the entry that received the most points from the jury. In the final, a tie would be decided in favour of the entry that received the most votes from the public.

==== Competing entries ====
On 17 October 2017, LRT opened two separate submission forms: one for artists and another for songwriters to submit their songs. Artists that applied to compete with a song were required to indicate which song they wanted to compete with on their application. The submission deadline for both applications concluded on 1 December 2017. On 15 January 2018, LRT announced the 50 artists selected for the competition. Among the artists was previous Lithuanian Eurovision contestant Erica Jennings, who represented Lithuania in 2001 as part of Skamp. The final changes to the list of 50 competing acts were made with the addition of Silvija Pankūnaitė to the list of performers and the replacement of Monika Marija for the withdrawal of Erica Jennings.

Artist	Song	Songwriter(s)
Agnė Michalenkovaitė	"Going On"	Paulius Jasiūnas, Justina Adeikytė
Audrius Petrauskas	"In My Bones"	Ashley Hicklin, Michael Schulte
Aušra Difartė	"Someday"	Aušra Difartė, Ramūnas Difartas
Benas Malakauskas	"My Memories"	Benas Malakauskas
Dainotas Varnas	"Merrygoround"	Kasparas Meginis, Edgaras Žaltauskas, Dainotas Varnas
Dangė	"Netikra laimė"	Dangė Šamonskienė
Donata	"Powerful"	Michael James Down, Will Taylor
E.G.O.	"Shake the World"	Karolis Šliažas, Vaida Kalkauskaitė
ELEY	"This Is My Life"	Eglė Jakštytė, Justinas Štaras, M. Muzaitė
El Fuego	"I Do Believe"	Paulius Bagdanavičius, Andrius Kairys
Elizabeth Olshey	"Bejausmis"	Elžbieta Oleškevič, Edvinas Pechovskis
Elvina Milkauskaitė	"So Long My Love, My Lover"	Aminata Savadogo, Christopher Wortley, Vallo Kikas
Emilija Valiukevičiūtė	"Bye Bye"	Emilija Valiukevičiūtė, Jerome Thomas
Evaldas Vaikasas	"Blind"	Paulius Jasiūnas, Justina Adeikytė
Gabrielius Vagelis	"The Distant"	Gabrielius Vagelis
GeraiGerai and Silvija Pankūnaitė	"More Than You Know"	Vilius Tamošaitis, Silvija Pankūnaitė
Germantė Kinderytė	"Turn It Up"	Sveinn Rúnar Sigurðsson, Oskar Nyman, Joel Isaksson, Renee Pozzi
Godo	"Fire Fountain"	Goda Sasnauskaitė, Jokūbas Tulaba
Greta Zazza	"Broken Shadows"	Jonas Thander, Charlie Mason
Ieva Zasimauskaitė	"When We're Old"	Vytautas Bikus
Joyce	"Breath"	Evelina Jocytė, Stepan Bitus
Juozas Martin	"Don't Give Up"	Juozas Martinkėnas
Jurgis Brūzga	"4Love"	Jurgis Brūzga, Tomas Dičiūnas, Kasparas Meginis, Edgaras Žaltauskas, Andrius Kairys
Justin 3	"Born to Be Wild One"	Justinas Stanislovaitis, Mario Kernn
Justina Žukauskaitė	"Love Doesn't Lie"	Vytautas Karpauskas, Delphi Freeman
Kotryna Juodzevičiūtė	"That Girl"	Ashley Hicklin, Marcel Závodi, Sofia Martha Maria Anessiadis, Glen Faria, Alan Roy Scott
LJ	"Over Now"	Vytautas Diškevičius
Lukas Norkūnas	"Tegu"	Lukas Norkūnas
Marija	"This Love"	Tim Larsson, Tobias Lundgren, Christian Fast, Hayley Aitken
Marius Petrauskas	"Kol meilė gyva"	Paulius Jasiūnas, Povilas Scerbavičius
Meda Meškauskaitė	"Blood Roses"	M. Franck, Jon Are Kulsveen, Aidan O'Connor
Mia	"Arrows"	Laurell Barker, Rickard Bonde Truumeel, Greig Watts
Milda Martinkėnaitė	"Hurricane"	Georgios Kalpakidis, Thomas Reil, Jeppe Reil, Maria Broberg
Milda Rasilavičiūtė	"Thinking About You"	Jonas Talandis, Milda Rasilavičiūtė
Monee	"Standing Here"	Deivydas Zvonkus, Elena Jurgaitytė, Viktorija Lakštutė
Monika Marija	"The Truth"	Erica Jennings, Vytautas Bikus
Natalja Chareckaja	"Serious"	Natalija Chareckaja
Ofelija	"Butterfly"	Liepa Maknavičiūtė, Filip Koscak
Paula	"1 2 3"	Gytis Valickas, Paula Valentaitė, Donatas Montvydas, Oskar Nyman, Joel Isaksson, Sveinn Rúnar Sigurðsson, Renee Pozzi
Rasa Kaušiūtė	"The Silence"	Samuel Bugia Garrido, Matthew Vassallo
Rugilė Daujotaitė	"Love Is the Flower of Life"	Rugilė Daujotaitė, Edwin Oranje, Sjoerd Limberger, Randy Meinderts-Hendriks
Rūta Kotryna	"Ghost"	Mia Milan, Christopher Wortley, Marcus Lindberg
Rūta Loop	"Positive Thoughts"	Rūta Žibaitytė, Paulius Vaicekauskas
Saulės kliošas	"Įkvėpk ir nepaleisk (Man gaila)"	Alvydas Mačiulskas, Paulius Volkovas, Laurynas Šarkinas, Justė Starinskaitė
Silvija Pankūnaitė	"Real"	Andreas Björkman, Adriana Pupavac, Aidan O’Connor
The Roop	"Yes, I Do"	Vaidotas Valiukevičius, Robertas Baranauskas, Vainius Šimukėnas, Mantas Banišauskas
Twosome	"Hello"	Justinas Stanislovaitis, Paulius Šinkūnas
Valdas Lacko	"Dying Inside"	Niklas Bergqvist, Simon Johansson, Nikos Sofis
Vidas Bareikis	"Pusvalanduko"	Vidas Bareikis
Živilė Gedvilaitė	"Melody"	Rūta Ščiogolevaitė-Damijonaitienė

==== Jury members ====
The jury panel consisted of four members in the elimination shows and the semi-finals, and seven members in the final.

Jury members by show
Jury member	Elimination shows						Semi-finals		Final	Occupation(s)
Jury member	1	2	3	4	5	6	1	2	Final	Occupation(s)
Aistė Pilvelytė	Yes	No	No	No	No	No	No	No	No	singer
Aleksandras Pogrebnojus	No	Yes	No	No	No	No	No	No	No	costume artist and designer
Arnoldas Lukošius	No	No	No	Yes	No	No	No	Yes	No	musician
Beata Nicholson	No	No	Yes	No	No	No	No	No	No	presenter
Dalia Ibelhauptaitė	No	No	No	No	No	No	Yes	Yes	Yes	director, playwright
Darius Užkuraitis	Yes	No	No	No	Yes	No	No	Yes	No	LRT Opus director
Dovilė Filmanavičiūtė	Yes	No	No	No	Yes	No	No	No	Yes	singer-songwriter
Gerūta Griniūtė	No	Yes	No	No	No	No	No	No	No	television and radio presenter
Giedrė Kilčiauskienė	No	No	Yes	No	No	No	Yes	No	No	singer
Leonas Somovas	No	No	No	Yes	No	No	No	No	Yes	producer
Milda Adomaitienė	No	No	No	No	No	No	No	No	Yes	music teacher
Monika Linkytė	No	No	No	No	No	Yes	No	No	No	singer-songwriter
Ramūnas Zilnys	Yes	Yes	Yes	Yes	Yes	Yes	Yes	Yes	Yes	music reviewer
Sasha Song	No	No	No	No	No	No	No	No	Yes	singer-songwriter
Tomas Sinickis	No	No	No	No	Yes	No	Yes	No	No	musician
Vaidas Baumila	No	Yes	No	No	No	Yes	No	No	No	singer
Vaidas Stackevičius	No	No	No	No	No	Yes	No	No	No	producer, head of the "M.P.3" music agency
Viktoras Diawara	No	No	Yes	No	No	No	No	No	No	singer, producer
Vytautas Rumšas Jr.	No	No	No	Yes	No	No	No	No	Yes	actor

==== Shows ====
===== Elimination shows =====
The six elimination shows of the competition aired from the LRT studios in Vilnius between 6 January and 17 February 2018. The first four shows featured the 50 competing entries, while the fifth and sixth show each featured 12 of the 24 remaining entries in the competition. The top six entries advanced from each show, while the bottom entries were eliminated.

Show 1 – 6 January 2018
R/O	Artist	Song	Jury	Televote		Total	Place
R/O	Artist	Song	Jury	Votes	Points	Total	Place
1	Justin 3	"Born to Be Wild One"	4	197	2	6	10
2	Monee	"Standing Here"	1	184	1	2	11
3	Germantė Kinderytė	"Turn It Up"	0	748	10	10	5
4	Godo	"Fire Fountain"	10	732	8	18	2
5	Lukas Norkūnas	"Tegu"	8	282	4	12	4
6	Meda Meškauskaitė	"Blood Roses"	0	91	0	0	13
7	Benas Malakauskas	"My Memories"	3	512	6	9	6
8	Milda Rasilavičiūtė	"Thinking About You"	6	561	7	13	3
9	Dangė	"Netikra laimė"	0	110	0	0	12
10	Natalja Chareckaja	"Serious"	7	172	0	7	8
11	Aušra Difartė	"Someday"	5	242	3	8	7
12	Evaldas Vaikasas	"Blind"	2	369	5	7	9
13	Ieva Zasimauskaitė	"When We're Old"	12	1,086	12	24	1

Show 2 – 20 January 2018
R/O	Artist	Song	Jury	Televote		Total	Place
R/O	Artist	Song	Jury	Votes	Points	Total	Place
1	Juozas Martin	"Don't Give Up"	8	202	4	12	5
2	Justina Žukauskaitė	"Love Doesn't Lie"	0	61	0	0	11
3	Elvina Milkauskaitė	"So Long My Love, My Lover"	2	143	3	5	9
4	LJ	"Over Now"	1	74	1	2	10
5	Rūta Kotryna	"Ghost"	5	126	2	7	8
6	Saulės kliošas	"Įkvėpk ir nepaleisk (Man gaila)"	12	435	6	18	1
7	Twosome	"Hello"	10	643	8	18	2
8	Paula	"1 2 3"	6	678	12	18	3
9	Audrius Petrauskas	"In My Bones"	7	244	5	12	6
10	Elizabeth Olshey	"Bejausmis"	3	643	10	13	4
11	Mia	"Arrows"	4	541	7	11	7
12	Emilija Valiukevičiūtė	"Bye Bye"	0	49	0	0	12

Show 3 – 27 January 2018
R/O	Artist	Song	Jury	Televote		Total	Place
R/O	Artist	Song	Jury	Votes	Points	Total	Place
1	Vidas Bareikis	"Pusvalanduko"	7	444	5	12	6
2	Donata	"Powerful"	0	54	0	0	12
3	Agnė Michalenkovaitė	"Going On"	7	526	10	17	2
4	GeraiGerai and Silvija Pankūnaitė	"More Than You Know"	8	496	7	15	4
5	Eley	"This Is My Life"	3	73	1	4	9
6	E.G.O.	"Shake the World"	0	67	0	0	11
7	Živilė Gedvilaitė	"Melody"	2	621	12	14	5
8	Joyce	"Breath"	4	175	2	6	8
9	Valdas Lacko	"Dying Inside"	1	399	3	4	10
10	Milda Martinkėnaitė	"Hurricane"	5	405	4	9	7
11	Gabrielius Vagelis	"The Distant"	10	476	6	16	3
12	Greta Zazza	"Broken Shadows"	12	502	8	20	1

Show 4 – 3 February 2018
R/O	Artist	Song	Jury	Televote		Total	Place
R/O	Artist	Song	Jury	Votes	Points	Total	Place
1	Rūta Loop	"Positive Thoughts"	4	794	5	9	6
2	Jurgis Brūzga	"4Love"	12	771	4	16	2
3	Ofelija	"Butterfly"	0	607	2	2	11
4	Dainotas Varnas	"Merrygoround"	5	737	3	8	7
5	Rugilė Daujotaitė	"Love Is the Flower of Life"	0	313	0	0	13
6	Kotryna Juodzevičiūtė	"That Girl"	8	833	6	14	5
7	Marius Petrauskas	"Kol meilė gyva"	2	554	1	3	10
8	Silvija Pankūnaitė	"Real"	1	368	0	1	12
9	El Fuego	"I Do Believe"	0	939	7	7	8
10	Marija	"This Love"	8	1,325	8	16	3
11	Rasa Kaušiūtė	"The Silence"	3	417	0	3	9
12	The Roop	"Yes, I Do"	6	1,347	10	16	4
13	Monika Marija	"The Truth"	10	1,354	12	22	1

Show 5 – 10 February 2018
R/O	Artist	Song	Jury	Televote		Total	Place
R/O	Artist	Song	Jury	Votes	Points	Total	Place
1	Twosome	"Hello"	7	660	4	11	5
2	Milda Rasilavičiūtė	"Thinking About You"	1	383	2	3	9
3	GeraiGerai and Silvija Pankūnaitė	"More Than You Know"	3	789	8	11	6
4	Lukas Norkūnas	"Tegu"	5	447	3	8	8
5	Paula	"1 2 3"	6	693	6	12	4
6	Benas Malakauskas	"My Memories"	0	321	1	1	11
7	Godo	"Fire Fountain"	10	721	7	17	3
8	Germantė Kinderytė	"Turn It Up"	0	186	0	0	12
9	Vidas Bareikis	"Pusvalanduko"	5	687	5	10	7
10	Juozas Martin	"Don't Give Up"	2	197	0	2	10
11	Kotryna Juodzevičiūtė	"That Girl"	12	837	10	22	1
12	Jurgis Brūzga	"4Love"	10	1,244	12	22	2

Show 6 – 17 February 2018
R/O	Artist	Song	Jury	Televote		Total	Place
R/O	Artist	Song	Jury	Votes	Points	Total	Place
1	Živilė Gedvilaitė	"Melody"	1	344	1	2	12
2	Audrius Petrauskas	"In My Bones"	7	231	0	7	8
3	Agnė Michalenkovaitė	"Going On"	1	510	3	4	10
4	Saulės kliošas	"Įkvėpk ir nepaleisk (Man gaila)"	10	740	6	16	3
5	Greta Zazza	"Broken Shadows"	4	589	4	8	7
6	Rūta Loop	"Positive Thoughts"	3	287	0	3	11
7	Marija	"This Love"	0	2,722	12	12	5
8	The Roop	"Yes, I Do"	6	2,496	10	16	4
9	Elizabeth Olshey	"Bejausmis"	2	472	2	4	9
10	Monika Marija	"The Truth"	10	1,399	7	17	2
11	Gabrielius Vagelis	"The Distant"	5	688	5	10	6
12	Ieva Zasimauskaitė	"When We're Old"	12	2,029	8	20	1

===== Online repechage =====
The bottom six entries of the fifth and sixth elimination shows were voted upon by the public through LRT's internet voting platform between 19 and 21 February 2018. The top two entries with the most votes advanced to the semi-finals.

Online repechage – 19–21 February 2018
Artist	Song	Votes	Place
Agnė Michalenkovaitė	"Going On"	—	—
Audrius Petrauskas	"In My Bones"	—	—
Benas Malakauskas	"My Memories"	—	—
Elizabeth Olshey	"Bejausmis"	—	—
Germantė Kinderytė	"Turn It Up"	—	—
Greta Zazza	"Broken Shadows"	4,484	1
Juozas Martin	"Don't Give Up"	—	—
Lukas Norkūnas	"Tegu"	—	—
Milda Rasilavičiūtė	"Thinking About You"	—	—
Rūta Loop	"Positive Thoughts"	3,928	2
Vidas Bareikis	"Pusvalanduko"	3,730	3
Živilė Gedvilaitė	"Melody"	—	—

===== Semi-finals =====
The two semi-finals of the competition took place at the LRT studios in Vilnius on 24 February and 3 March 2018 and featured seven competing entries each. The semi-finals were broadcast live; all other preceding shows were pre-recorded earlier in the week before their airdates. The top three entries advanced to the final from each semi-final, while the bottom four were eliminated.

Semi-final 1 – 24 February 2018
R/O	Artist	Song	Jury	Televote		Total	Place
R/O	Artist	Song	Jury	Votes	Points	Total	Place
1	Gabrielius Vagelis	"The Distant"	4	486	4	8	7
2	GeraiGerai and Silvija Pankūnaitė	"More Than You Know"	6	1,120	7	13	6
3	Kotryna Juodzevičiūtė	"That Girl"	10	912	6	16	3
4	The Roop	"Yes, I Do"	7	2,664	12	19	2
5	Godo	"Fire Fountain"	8	746	5	13	5
6	Greta Zazza	"Broken Shadows"	6	1,220	8	14	4
7	Jurgis Brūzga	"4Love"	12	1,648	10	22	1

Semi-final 2 – 3 March 2018
R/O	Artist	Song	Jury	Televote		Total	Place
R/O	Artist	Song	Jury	Votes	Points	Total	Place
1	Marija	"This Love"	5	2,463	8	13	5
2	Twosome	"Hello"	8	1,526	7	15	4
3	Ieva Zasimauskaitė	"When We're Old"	12	2,705	12	24	1
4	Paula	"1 2 3"	10	1,456	6	16	3
5	Saulės Kliošas	"Įkvėpk ir Nepaleisk (Man gaila)"	6	1,344	5	11	6
6	Rūta Loop	"Positive Thoughts"	4	297	4	8	7
7	Monika Marija	"The Truth"	7	2,518	10	17	2

===== Final =====
The final of the competition took place on 11 March 2018 at the Žalgirio Arena in Kaunas and featured the remaining six entries that qualified from the semi-finals. "When We're Old", performed by Ieva Zasimauskaitė, was selected as the winner after gaining the most points following the combination of the jury vote and the public vote. In addition to the performances of the competing entries, the show was opened with 2001 Lithuanian Eurovision entrant Skamp performing the song "Laisvė", Raminta Naujalytė-Bjelle performing the song "Baltas paukštis", Fusedmarc performing the 2017 Lithuanian Eurovision entry "Rain of Revolution", and Ari Ólafsson performing the 2018 Icelandic Eurovision entry "Our Choice", while the interval acts included Original Copy, Thundertale, juror Sasha Song, Moniqué performing the song "Nenoriu grįžt namo", and Saara Aalto performing a modified version of the 2018 Finnish Eurovision entry "Monsters", which contained one verse in Lithuanian.

Final – 11 March 2018
R/O	Artist	Song	Jury		Televote		Total	Place
R/O	Artist	Song	Votes	Points	Votes	Points	Total	Place
1	Monika Marija	"The Truth"	62	8	13,755	8	16	4
2	Kotryna Juodzevičiūtė	"That Girl"	46	6	1,390	6	12	5
3	The Roop	"Yes, I Do"	50	7	16,491	10	17	3
4	Paula	"1 2 3"	38	5	1,160	5	10	6
5	Jurgis Brūzga	"4Love"	71	12	5,382	7	19	2
6	Ieva Zasimauskaitė	"When We're Old"	70	10	20,335	12	22	1

=== Promotion ===
Ieva Zasimauskaitė made several appearances across Europe to specifically promote "When We're Old" as the Lithuanian Eurovision entry. On 24 March, Zasimauskaitė performed during the Eurovision PreParty Riga, which was organised by OGAE Latvia and held at the Crystal Club Concert Hall in Riga, Latvia. Between 8 and 11 April, Zasimauskaitė took part in promotional activities in Tel Aviv, Israel, and performed during the Israel Calling event held at the Rabin Square. On 17 April, Zasimauskaitė performed during the London Eurovision Party, which was held at the Café de Paris venue in London, United Kingdom and hosted by Nicki French and Paddy O'Connell.

== At Eurovision ==
According to Eurovision rules, all nations with the exceptions of the host country and the "Big Five" (France, Germany, Italy, Spain and the United Kingdom) are required to qualify from one of two semi-finals in order to compete for the final; the top 10 countries from each semi-final progress to the final. The European Broadcasting Union (EBU) split up the competing countries into six different pots based on voting patterns from previous contests, with countries with favourable voting histories put into the same pot. On 29 January 2018, an allocation draw was held which placed each country into one of the two semi-finals, as well as which half of the show they would perform in. Lithuania was placed into the first semi-final, to be held on 8 May 2018, and was scheduled to perform in the first half of the show.

Once all the competing songs for the 2018 contest had been released, the running order for the semi-finals was decided by the shows' producers rather than through another draw, so that similar songs were not placed next to each other. Lithuania was set to perform in position 6, following the entry from the Czech Republic and before the entry from Israel.

The two semi-finals and final were broadcast in Lithuania on LRT and LRT Radijas with commentary by Darius Užkuraitis and Gerūta Griniūtė. The Lithuanian spokesperson who announced the top 12-point score awarded by the Lithuanian jury during the final was Eglė Daugėlaitė.

=== Semi-final ===
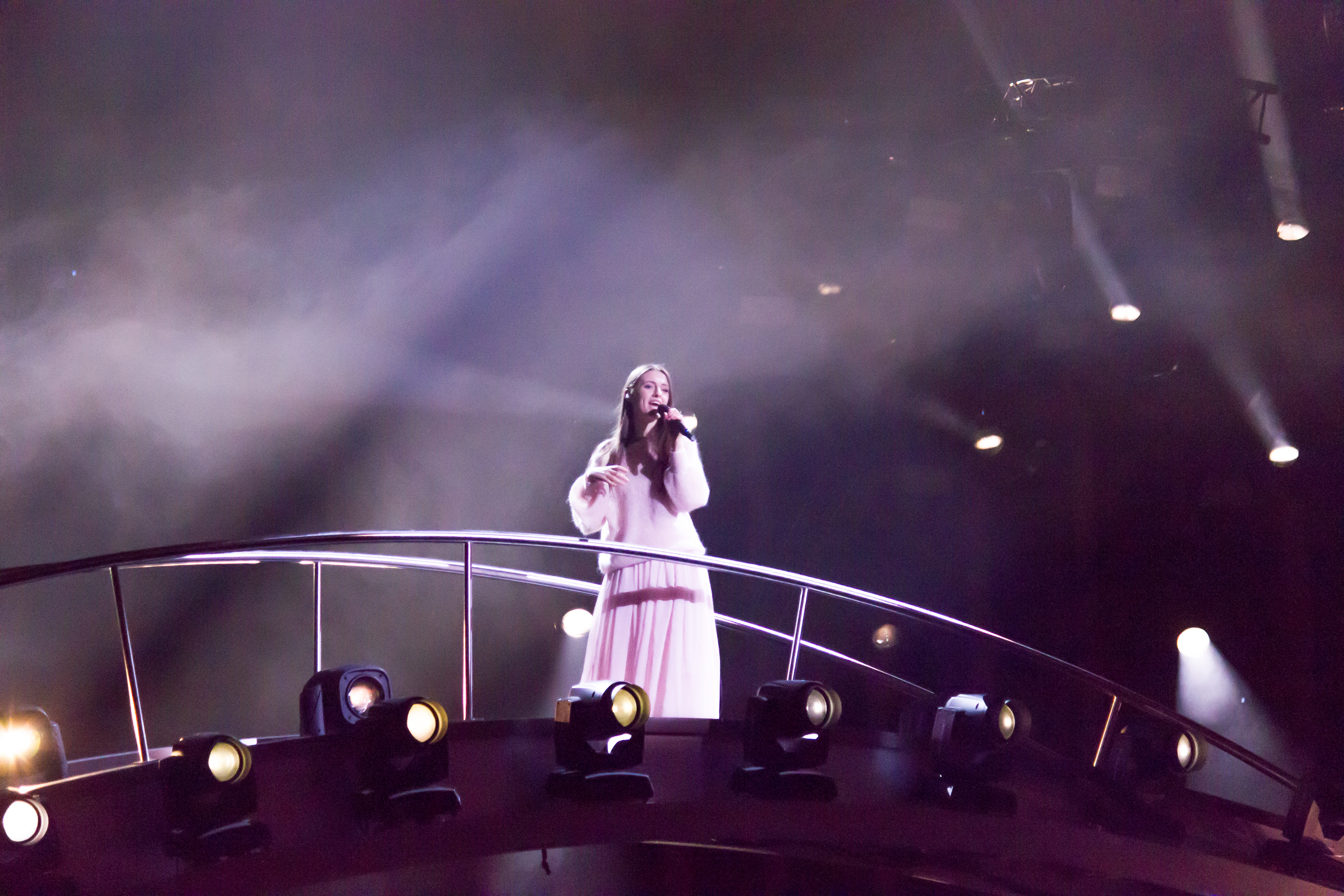
Ieva Zasimauskaitė during a rehearsal before the first semi-final

Ieva Zasimauskaitė took part in technical rehearsals on 29 April and 3 May, followed by dress rehearsals on 7 and 8 May. This included the jury show on 7 May, where the professional juries of each country watched and voted on the competing entries.

The Lithuanian performance featured Ieva Zasimauskaitė performing on stage in a pastel pink costume. The performance began with Zasimauskaitė sitting at the centre of the stage with a spotlight being displayed, and featured yellow lighting at the first chorus. The performance also featured black-and-white holograms of people walking, dancing, and showing love for each other. For the final chorus, Zasimauskaitė moved onto the stage bridge and was met at the end by her husband Marius Kiltinavičius. The stage director for the Lithuanian performance was Povilas Varvuolis. Ieva Zasimauskaitė was also joined by an off-stage backing vocalist: Akmėja Bru.

At the end of the show, Lithuania was announced as having finished in the top 10 and subsequently qualifying for the final. It was later revealed that Lithuania placed ninth in the semi-final, receiving a total of 119 points: 62 points from the televoting and 57 points from the juries.

=== Final ===
Shortly after the first semi-final, a winners' press conference was held for the 10 qualifying countries. As part of this press conference, the qualifying artists took part in a draw to determine which half of the final they would subsequently participate in. This draw was done in the order the countries were announced during the semi-final. Lithuania was drawn to compete in the first half. Following this draw, the shows' producers decided upon the running order of the final, as they had done for the semi-finals. Lithuania was subsequently placed to perform in position 4, following the entry from Slovenia and before the entry from Austria.

Ieva Zasimauskaitė once again took part in dress rehearsals on 11 and 12 May before the final, including the jury final, where the professional juries cast their final votes before the live show. Lithuania placed 12th in the final, scoring 181 points: 91 points from the televoting and 90 points from the juries.

=== Voting ===
Voting during the three shows involved each country awarding two sets of points from 1–8, 10 and 12: one from their professional jury and the other from televoting. Each nation's jury consisted of five music industry professionals who are citizens of the country they represent, with their names published before the contest to ensure transparency. This jury judged each entry based on: vocal capacity; the stage performance; the song's composition and originality; and the overall impression by the act. In addition, no member of a national jury was permitted to be related in any way to any of the competing acts in such a way that they cannot vote impartially and independently. The individual rankings of each jury member as well as the nation's televoting results were released shortly after the final.

Below is a breakdown of points awarded to Lithuania and awarded by Lithuania in the first semi-final and grand final of the contest, and the breakdown of the jury voting and televoting conducted during the two shows:

==== Points awarded to Lithuania ====
Points awarded to Lithuania (Semi-final 1)
Score	Televote	Jury
12 points	Ireland; United Kingdom	Portugal
10 points	Estonia	Bulgaria; Estonia
8 points		Croatia
7 points		Switzerland
6 points	Belarus; Portugal	
5 points		
4 points	Belgium	
3 points	Cyprus; Iceland; Spain	Czech Republic
2 points	Finland	Austria; Finland; Israel
1 point	Azerbaijan	Albania

Points awarded to Lithuania (Final)
Score	Televote	Jury
12 points	Estonia; Ireland; Latvia; Norway; United Kingdom	Croatia
10 points		Bulgaria; Estonia
8 points		Switzerland
7 points	Georgia; Sweden	Netherlands
6 points	Cyprus	Portugal; Romania
5 points	Malta	Belarus; Hungary
4 points	Germany	Germany; Latvia
3 points		Australia; Norway; Russia
2 points	Ukraine	Georgia
1 point		Czech Republic; Poland

==== Points awarded by Lithuania ====
Points awarded by Lithuania (Semi-final 1)
Score	Televote	Jury
12 points	Estonia	Ireland
10 points	Austria	Austria
8 points	Belgium	Belgium
7 points	Czech Republic	Israel
6 points	Belarus	Switzerland
5 points	Cyprus	Czech Republic
4 points	Ireland	Estonia
3 points	Finland	Bulgaria
2 points	Bulgaria	Finland
1 point	Israel	Albania

Points awarded by Lithuania (Final)
Score	Televote	Jury
12 points	Estonia	Austria
10 points	Denmark	France
8 points	Czech Republic	Sweden
7 points	Italy	Portugal
6 points	Cyprus	Israel
5 points	France	Germany
4 points	Sweden	Ireland
3 points	Austria	Netherlands
2 points	Germany	Hungary
1 point	Israel	Cyprus

==== Detailed voting results ====
The following members comprised the Lithuanian jury:

- Lauras Lučiūnas (jury chairperson) – music producer
- Jurga Šeduikytė Bareikienė (Jurga) – singer, actress, journalist
- Dovilė Filmanavičiūtė (Miss Sheep) – singer, journalist
- Mindaugas Urbaitis – composer, professor
- Leonas Somovas (Leon Somov) – composer, singer, music producer

Detailed voting results from Lithuania (Semi-final 1)
R/O	Country	Jury							Televote	
R/O	Country	Jurga	Miss Sheep	M. Urbaitis	L. Somov	L. Lučiūnas	Rank	Points	Rank	Points
01	Azerbaijan	17	18	17	18	13	18		11	
02	Iceland	7	14	12	16	12	13		15	
03	Albania	6	13	5	14	18	10	1	14	
04	Belgium	4	6	8	4	1	3	8	3	8
05	Czech Republic	8	7	3	7	10	6	5	4	7
06	Lithuania									
07	Israel	11	2	4	3	5	4	7	10	1
08	Belarus	18	12	16	17	11	17		5	6
09	Estonia	3	8	9	11	6	7	4	1	12
10	Bulgaria	10	4	7	8	9	8	3	9	2
11	Macedonia	15	11	15	15	15	16		18	
12	Croatia	12	10	10	9	14	11		16	
13	Austria	1	1	2	1	7	2	10	2	10
14	Greece	9	15	14	13	8	12		17	
15	Finland	14	9	11	12	3	9	2	8	3
16	Armenia	16	16	13	10	17	15		13	
17	Switzerland	5	5	6	5	4	5	6	12	
18	Ireland	2	3	1	2	2	1	12	7	4
19	Cyprus	13	17	18	6	16	14		6	5

Detailed voting results from Lithuania (Final)
R/O	Country	Jury							Televote	
R/O	Country	Jurga	Miss Sheep	M. Urbaitis	L. Somov	L. Lučiūnas	Rank	Points	Rank	Points
01	Ukraine	19	24	18	16	19	22		12	
02	Spain	8	11	8	14	20	13		24	
03	Slovenia	9	10	16	15	8	12		22	
04	Lithuania									
05	Austria	2	3	3	2	4	1	12	8	3
06	Estonia	13	18	14	13	16	18		1	12
07	Norway	7	16	9	19	18	16		18	
08	Portugal	1	6	1	10	10	4	7	21	
09	United Kingdom	10	15	11	11	11	15		20	
10	Serbia	23	20	21	23	23	24		25	
11	Germany	4	7	2	6	13	6	5	9	2
12	Albania	11	12	5	21	24	14		23	
13	France	5	2	19	1	1	2	10	6	5
14	Czech Republic	24	14	13	17	15	20		3	8
15	Denmark	21	21	23	24	17	23		2	10
16	Australia	18	13	22	9	12	17		11	
17	Finland	22	17	24	20	9	19		19	
18	Bulgaria	14	9	17	12	6	11		17	
19	Moldova	25	25	25	25	25	25		16	
20	Sweden	17	1	6	3	2	3	8	7	4
21	Hungary	20	19	4	22	7	9	2	14	
22	Israel	3	4	10	4	3	5	6	10	1
23	Netherlands	15	5	12	5	22	8	3	13	
24	Ireland	6	8	7	7	14	7	4	15	
25	Cyprus	12	23	20	8	5	10	1	5	6
26	Italy	16	22	15	18	21	21		4	7
