= Gytis Ivanauskas =

Lithuanian actor, dancer and choreographer

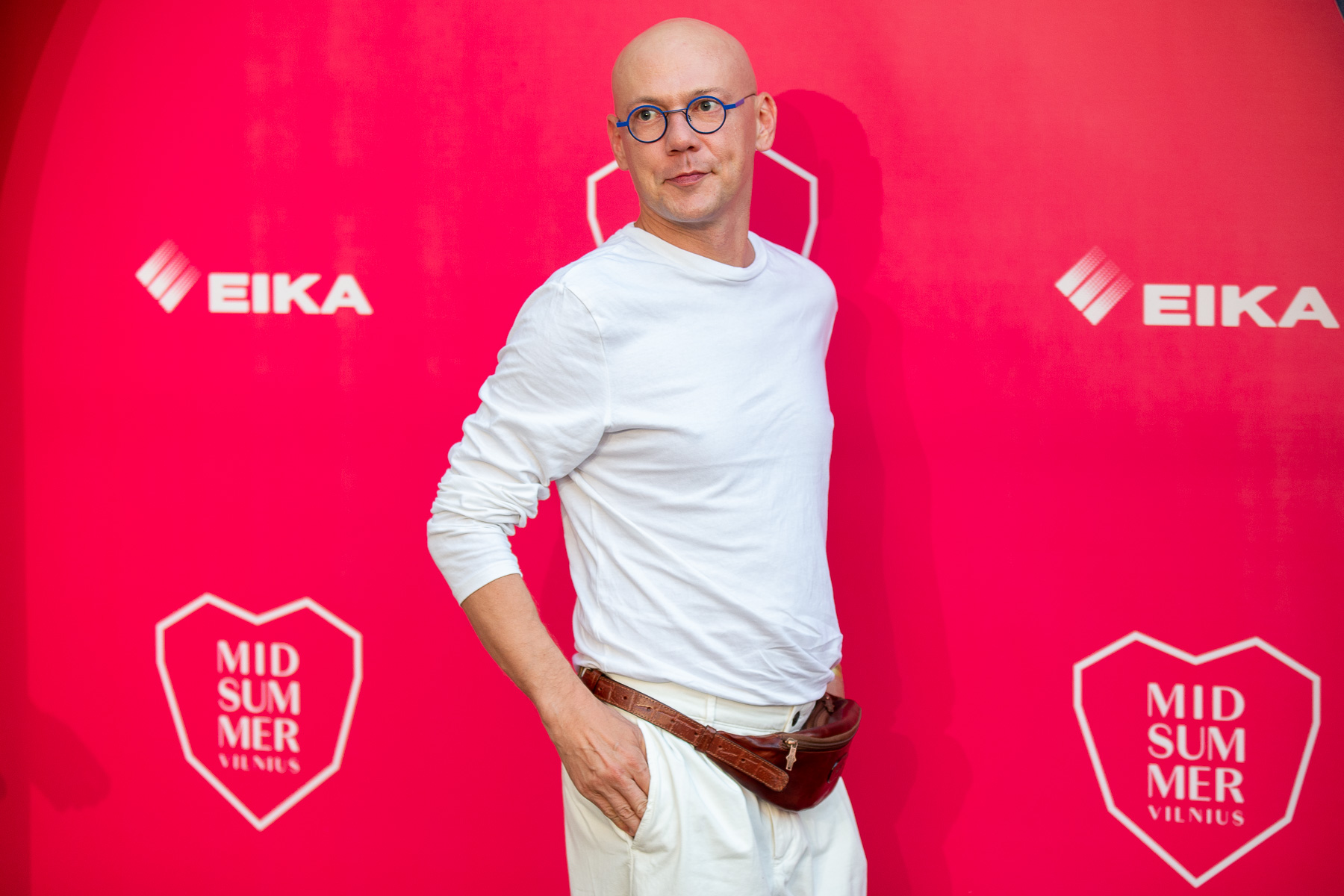

Gytis Ivanauskas (born 1 June 1980) is a Lithuanian actor, dancer and choreographer. In 2005, he established his own theatre, called Gytis Ivanauskas Theatre (GI Theatre).

== Biography ==
Ivanauskas was born in Ukmergė. Between 1996 and 1998, he studied arts at the National M. K. Čiurlionis School of Art and in 1999 was admitted to the faculty of Theatre and Cinema at the Lithuanian Music Academy. In 2004 he obtained master's degree (dancing actor).

Ivanauskas entered the professional stage in 2000 when he played the teenager Kurt in M. Von Mayenburg play "Fireface" which was directed by Oskaras Koršunovas. Biggest roles that made him famous are Romeo in "Romeo and Juliet" by William Shakespeare (director Oskaras Koršunovas) and Raskolnikov in "Crime and Punishment" by Fyodor Dostoyevsky (director Gintaras Varnas).

Ivanauskas also takes part in various dance projects, created scenography for his one-man show "Lighthouse" (director Gintaras Varnas). In 2005 he established his own Gytis Ivanauskas Theatre (GIT) where he has directed shows like "Hallmark", "Men in White Skirts", "Red Shoes", "The Birds" and others.

In 2005 he received the Lithuanian Theatre Union's prize "Fortune" for Raskolnikov in the "Crime and punishment" and was nominated for the Lithuanian Ministry of Culture prize "The golden stage cross" for Raskolnikov in "Crime and punishment" and "Boy in Lighthouse". In 2006 he became a laureate of National Debut Premium for young artists awarded by Lithuanian Ministry of Culture. On 6 April 2007, Ivanauskas was awarded a national status of art creator.

== Lolita Zero ==
In 2017, Ivanauskas played a role of Lolita Zero, a drag queen, in film Zero 3 directed by Emilis Vėlyvis. With this character, Ivanauskas participated in the national selection for the Eurovision Song Contest 2017. Ivanauskas lip-synched to the main vocal of Jurijus Veklenko and the act placed 4th. Lolita Zero returned to the national selection in 2022 with "Not Your Mother". This time the character was more a hermaphrodite singing about releasing inner demons and letting it go on the dance floor. The act placed 3rd.

== Links ==
- Official Gytis Ivanauskas Theatre page
- Kaunas State Drama Theatre page
