= Ieva Zasimauskaitė =

Lithuanian singer (born 1993)

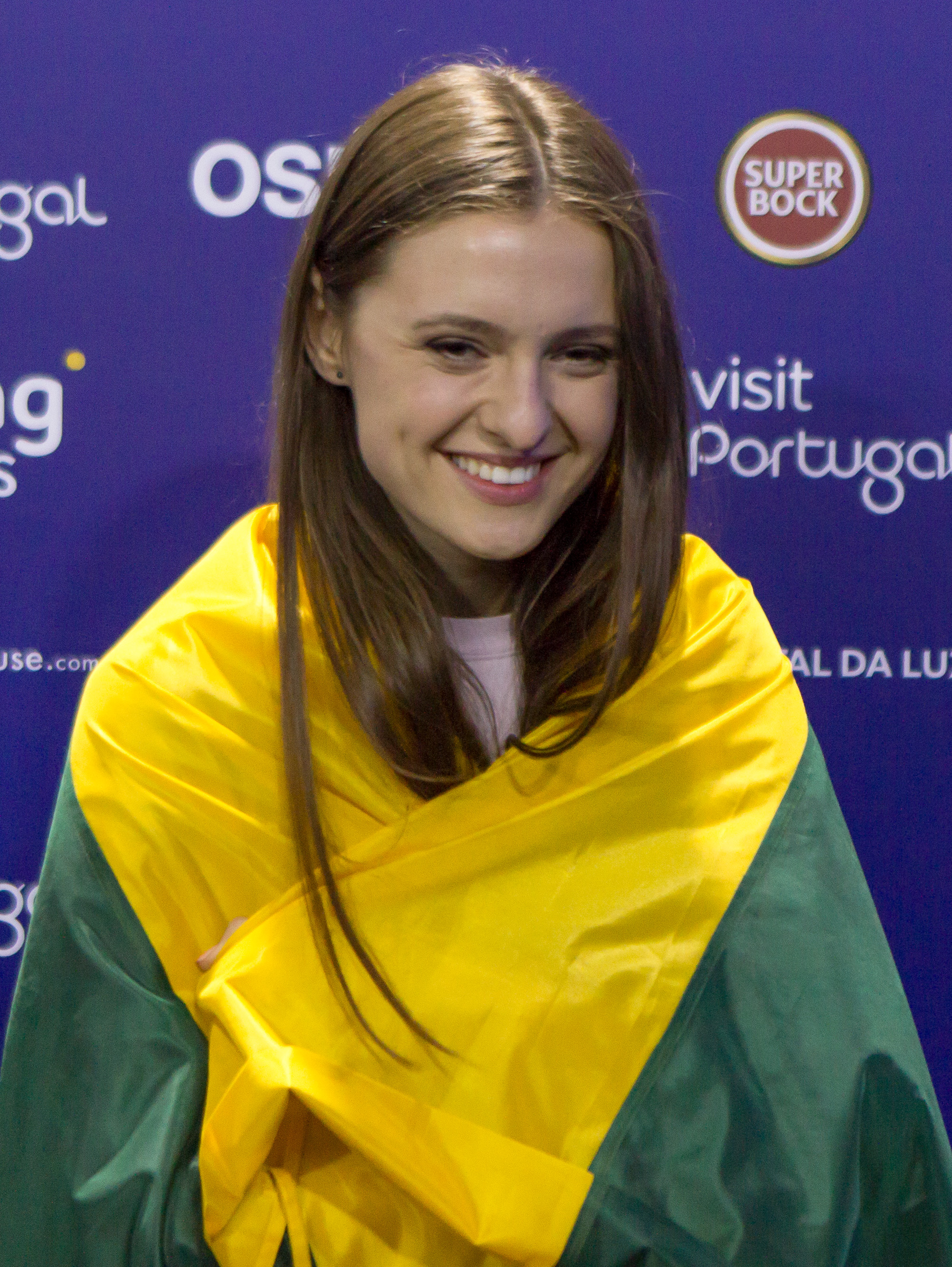
- Ieva Zasimauskaitė at the Eurovision Song Contest 2018 in Lisbon.

Background information
- Born: Ieva Zasimauskaitė; 2 July 1993 (age 33); Kaunas, Lithuania
- Genres: Pop
- Occupation: Singer
- Years active: 2012–present

Ieva Zasimauskaitė (pronounced [ˈjɛvɐ zɐsʲɪmɒʊ̯ˈskaɪ̯tʲeː]; born 2 July 1993) is a Lithuanian singer who represented Lithuania in the Eurovision Song Contest 2018 with her song "When We're Old". She had previously participated in the Lithuanian national selection for the Eurovision in 2013, 2014, 2016, and 2017, and participated again in 2022 and 2025.

== Biography ==
Ieva Zasimauskaitė was born and raised in Kaunas, the second largest city of Lithuania. In 2012, she graduated from Kaunas Vytautas Magnus University Rasos Gymnasium in Kalniečiai. In 2015, she received a Bachelor's degree in Hotel Management from the International School of Law and Business (TTVAM) in the Lithuanian capital Vilnius. In 2014, Zasimauskaitė spent a semester following the Erasmus Programme in Barcelona, Spain. In the spring of 2015, she completed an internship in a hotel in her hometown Kaunas, and for some time worked in a gift shop.

At the age of seven, Zasimauskaitė was sent to the vocal class of the Kaunas Music School, where she studied for eight years. At the music school, Zasimauskaitė sang in the Children's vocal band "Linksmasis do" and played the piano. During this time, she also participated in various competitions and festivals. In 2007, she went to the Junior Eurovision Song Contest 2007 as a backing vocalist for Lina Jurevičiūtė. When she was 16 years old, she became a member of the Kaunas Choir on the TV3 project "Chorų karai" (Clash of the Choirs). After the choir won the TV project, Zasimauskaitė performed for three years together with the choir throughout Lithuania (giving up to 16 concerts per month). Afterwards, she began to work personally with the composer and music producer Tautkus, leader of the Boy band N.E.O. At that time, she met her future husband, who was a member of the band.

In 2012, Zasimauskaitė participated in the project Lietuvos balsas ("The Voice of Lithuania"). She managed to reach the superfinal and sang with Dima Bilan, performing his hit song "Never Let You Go". Shortly thereafter, she began her solo career and composed her first song "Pasiilgau" ('I miss'). She then had many concerts with her band. Mostly, she sang at corporate events and weddings, performing songs by Adele, Rihanna, and Alicia Keys.

Zasimauskaitė learned vocals from rock singer Česlovas Gabalis, opera singer Kristina Zmailaitė, Rosita Čivilytė, and Gendrius Jokūbėnas.

Zasimauskaitė is also a songwriter and sings self-composed songs.

== Personal life ==
Zasimauskaitė's parents are medical employees. Her father plays guitar. Zasimauskaitė has an older brother Ugnius (born 1989).

Zasimauskaitė was married to Marius Kiltinavičius (born 1982) in June 2015, after a relationship of five years, in a Catholic Archangel Michael Church of Kaunas. Kiltinavičius is a former coach of the Lithuanian National Basketball Team (U-20), former coach of BC Sūduva-Mantinga, and also a former singer of the boy band N.E.O. In 2014, they both became vegetarians. They are interested in Ayurveda and practice meditation. They have travelled together as pilgrims to India several times. Zasimauskaitė is a follower of the Hare Krishna movement, a Hindu religious organisation. The couple divorced in 2020.

Zasimauskaitė married her second husband, Vaishnava monk Simas Grabauskas, on June 21, 2021. The couple welcomed their first child, a daughter, on June 14, 2023.

== Discography ==
=== Singles ===
Title	Year	Peak chart positions			Album
Title	Year	SCO	SWE Heat.	UK Down.	Album
"Life (Not That Beautiful)"	2016	—	—	—	Non-album single
"You Saved Me"	2017	—	—	—	Non-album single
"When We're Old"	2018	88	10	94	Non-album single
"Paslėpk mane"	2018	—	—	—	Non-album single
"Absorbed"	2018	—	—	—	Non-album single
"Apkabink"	2018	—	—	—	Non-album single
"Aš galiu skrist"	2019	—	—	—	Non-album single
"What Do You Want From Me"	2019	—	—	—	Non-album single
"Visą save"	2019	—	—	—	Non-album single
"Praėjo"	2020	—	—	—	Non-album single
"Labas Tau Tariu"	2020	—	—	—	Non-album single
"Mano Lietuva (with Džimba)"	2020	—	—	—	Non-album single
"Jau Nieko Neliko"	2020	—	—	—	Non-album single
"I'll Be There"	2022	—	—	—	Non-album single
"Apie Mus"	2023	—	—	—	Non-album single
"Laišką tau rašau"	2023	—	—	—	Non-album single

Awards and achievements
Preceded by Fusedmarc with "Rain of Revolution"	Lithuania in the Eurovision Song Contest; 2018	Succeeded by Jurij Veklenko with "Run with the Lions"
