= Alanas Chošnau =

- Born: Alanas Ibrahimas Chošnau; July 11, 1974 (age 52); Vilnius, Lithuania
- Origin: Lithuanian
- Genres: Pop
- Occupations: Singer, songwriter
- Instrument: Vocals
- Years active: 1992–present
- Labels: Monaco Production, Melodija
- Formerly of: Naktinės personos
- Website: http://www.alanaschosnau.com/

Alanas Chošnau (born July 11, 1974) is a Lithuanian singer and songwriter. From 1992–2001 and 2014–2018, he was the frontman of the band Naktinės Personos. From 2001 and 2009 and since 2019, Chošnau successfully developed a solo career. He won the 'Best Performer of the Year', 'Best Song', 'Best Video', 'Golden Disc' in the Lithuanian National Radio Awards. Chošnau is continuously named as one of the most played and most performing artists of Lithuania.

== Biography ==
Chošnau was born to a Lithuanian mother and Kurdish father from Iraq in Vilnius, Lithuania. The family—Chošnau with his parents and sister Greta—lived in Baghdad, Iraq until Chošnau's mother died in 1983. The 8-year-old Chošnau returned to Lithuania and was raised by his grandparents. However, his then teenaged sister was left in Baghdad with their father. Thus Chošnau grew up speaking the Arabic language and only later learned the Lithuanian language. Tragic family split was not enough for the destiny. The long lasting Iraq–Iran war separated Chošnau from his father and sister for a long time.

Despite all of the difficult times and severe emotions, Chošnau established the pop music group Naktinės Personos along with Aras Vėberis in 1992. Chošnau performed as the frontman singer of Naktinės Personos over 10 years until the group split in 2001. During the Naktinės Personos national tour in 1997, Chošnau together with Aras and their manager got into road accident crashing his car and severely injuring the neck, which temporally paralysed both legs. Fortunately, after a long treatment and rehabilitation Chošnau fully recovered and returned back to the music. In 1992 – 2001 Naktinės Personos released 10 albums and 2 singles with multiple national awards the 'Band of the Year' and 'Album of the Year'. It was a truly successful band attracting up to 30,000 fans at their live concerts (Vingis Park, 1998).

Since 2001 Chošnau continues releasing new style music and performing live as a solo artist proving another level of success. Chošnau released 7 solo albums until 2009 and then he made a break travelling to his fatherland Baghdad (Iraq) and Amman (Jordan) for creative and personal recharge.

During his solo period, in 2003, Chošnau released his debut solo album Pusiau atmerktos akys, which was sold in a more than 10,000 copies in 3 months and was announced 'Golden',. In the same year, it was immediately followed by another solo album Mintimis su tavimi, which became 'Golden' again. In 2003 Chošnau was nominated by the national "Bravo Awards" as the "Male Singer of the Year".

In 2004 Chošnau participated in a reality show Džiunglės a survival competition in Malaysian jungles organised by TV3 television channel TV3. In 2007 Chošnau took part in another TV projects such as Šok su žvaigžde!(Lithuanian installment of Dancing with the Stars) and Žvaigždžių duetai on LNK (singing competition of celebrity duos) in 2008. Chošnau song Kur gimsta lašai, released within the third solo album, became the theme song of the project Džiunglės. In 2008, Chošnau played the artist's role in a Lithuanian movie 5 dienų avantiūra ('Five Days Affair').

== Naktinės Personos discography ==
=== Albums ===
- 1993 / Muzika ir daugiau (Music and More)
- 1994 / Ramiai (Peacefully)
- 1995 / Tiems, kurie mūsų negirdi (For Those Who Don't Hear Us)
- 1996 / Pažvelk kitaip (Take a Different Look)
- 1996 / Tikras garsas (Live)
- 1997 / Sexta (Sexta)
- 1998 / Atvirai (Honestly)
- 1999 / 9 dainos (Nine Songs)
- 2000 / Diena. Naktis (The Day. The Night)
- 2001 / Šilko kelias (Silky Way)

=== Singles ===
- 1997 / Kelyje (On the Road)
- 1998 / Ša la la (Sha-la-la)

=== Main Achievements ===
- 1997 / The Best Band of the Year (Radiocentras Music Awards)
- 1997 / The Best Song of the Year "Sukasi ratu" (Radiocentras Music Awards)
- 1998 / The Best Band of the Year (Bravo Music Awards)
- 1998 / The Concert of Naktinės Personos attracts 30 000 fans
- 1999 / The Best Band of the Year (Radiocentras Music Awards)
- 1999 / The Best Band of the Year (Bravo Music Awards)

== Solo discography ==
=== Albums ===
- 2003 / Pusiau atmerktos akys (Half-Open Eyes)
- 2003 / Mintimis su tavimi (With You in My Mind)
- 2005 / Iš dangaus (Out of the Sky)
- 2005 / Akustinis koncertas tamsoje (Acoustic Concert in the Dark)
- 2007 / Aš kaip ir tu (Me Like You)
- 2008 / Geriausios dainos (The Greatest Hits)
- 2009 / Geri laikai (Good times)

=== Main Achievements ===
- 2003 / The Golden Disc Award for the album Pusiau atmerktos akys (Half-Open Eyes)
- 2003 / The Best Song of the Year for the song ‘Laiškas ant sniego’ (Letter on the Snow) (Lithuanian National Radio Awards)
- 2004 / The Best Performer of the Year (Radiocentras Music Awards)
- 2004 / The Golden Disc Award for the album ‘Mintimis su tavimi’ (With You in My Mind)
- 2004 / The Best Male Video ‘Meilė tau’ (My Love for You) (Tango TV Music Awards)
- 2005 / President of the children and youth music festival ‘We are the World’
- 2006/ The Best Performer of the Year (Radiocentras Music Awards)
- 2006 / The Best Performer of the Year (Lithuanian JP Music Awards)
- 2008 / Silver Microphone Award in "Celebrity Duos Show" (LNK TV)
