= When We're Old =

2018 song performed by Ieva Zasimauskaitė

Single by Ieva Zasimauskaitė
- Released: 13 February 2018
- Genre: Pop
- Length: 2:59
- Songwriter: Vytautas Bikus

Ieva Zasimauskaitė singles chronology
"You Saved Me" (2017)	"When We're Old" (2018)	"Paslėpk Mane" (2018)

Music video
- "When We're Old" on YouTube

Eurovision Song Contest 2018 entry
- Country: Lithuania
- Artist: Ieva Zasimauskaitė
- Language: English
- Composer: Vytautas Bikus
- Lyricist: Vytautas Bikus

Finals performance
- Semi-final result: 9th
- Semi-final points: 119
- Final result: 12th
- Final points: 181

Entry chronology
- ◄ "Rain of Revolution" (2017)
- "Run with the Lions" (2019) ►

"When We're Old" is a song performed by Lithuanian singer Ieva Zasimauskaitė and written by Vytautas Bikus. The song was released as a digital download on 13 February 2018.

== Eurovision Song Contest ==
It represented Lithuania in the Eurovision Song Contest 2018 after winning "Eurovizijos" dainų konkurso nacionalinė atranka. The song competed in the first semi-final, held on 8 May 2018 in Lisbon, Portugal and was one of the ten qualifiers of the night. The song finished 12th with 181 points at the grand final, including 91 points from televote (10th place) and 90 points from the juries (11th place).

== Track listing ==
Digital download
No.	Title	Length
1.	"When We're Old"	2:59
2.	"Kol Myliu"	2:59

== Charts ==
Chart (2018)	Peak position
Scottish Singles Sales (Official Charts)	88
Sweden Heatseeker (Sverigetopplistan)	10
UK Singles Downloads (Official Charts)	94

== Release history ==
Region	Date	Format	Label
Worldwide	13 February 2018	Digital download	Self-released
