= Lithuania in the Eurovision Song Contest 2017 =

- Eurovision Song Contest 2017
- Country: Lithuania
- Selection process: "Eurovizijos" dainų konkurso nacionalinė atranka
- Selection date: 11 March 2017

Competing entry
- Song: "Rain of Revolution"
- Artist: Fusedmarc
- Songwriters: Viktorija Ivanovskaja; Denis Zujev; Michail Levin

Placement
- Semi-final result: Failed to qualify (17th)

Participation chronology

Lithuania was represented at the Eurovision Song Contest 2017 with the song "Rain of Revolution" written by Viktorija Ivanovskaja, Denis Zujev and Michail Levin. The song was performed by the band Fusedmarc. The Lithuanian broadcaster Lithuanian National Radio and Television (LRT) organised the national final "Eurovizijos" dainų konkurso nacionalinė atranka (Eurovision Song Contest national selection) in order to select the Lithuanian entry for the 2017 contest in Kyiv, Ukraine. The national final took place over 10 weeks and involved 49 competing entries. The results of each show were determined by the combination of votes from a jury panel and a public vote. In the final, seven artists and songs remained and "Rain of Revolution" performed by Fusedmarc was selected as the winner.

Lithuania was drawn to compete in the second semi-final of the Eurovision Song Contest which took place on 11 May 2017. Performing during the show in position 16, "Rain of Revolution" was not announced among the top 10 entries of the second semi-final and therefore did not qualify to compete in the final. It was later revealed that Lithuania placed seventeenth out of the 18 participating countries in the semi-final with 42 points.

== Background ==
Prior to the 2017 contest, Lithuania had participated in the Eurovision Song Contest seventeen times since its first entry in 1994. The nation's best placing in the contest was sixth, which it achieved in 2006 with the song "We Are the Winners" performed by LT United. Following the introduction of semi-finals for the 2004, Lithuania, to this point, has managed to qualify to the final eight times. In the 2016 contest, "I've Been Waiting for This Night" performed by Donny Montell qualified to the final where the song scored 200 points and placed 9th.

For the 2017 Contest, Lithuanian national broadcaster LRT broadcast the event within the nation and organised the selection process for its entry. Other than the internal selection of their debut entry in 1994, Lithuania has selected their entry consistently through a national final procedure. LRT confirmed their intentions to participate at the 2017 Eurovision Song Contest on 11 August 2016 and announced the organization of "Eurovizijos" dainų konkurso nacionalinė atranka, which would be the national final to select Lithuania's entry for Kyiv.

== Before Eurovision ==
=== "Eurovizijos" dainų konkurso nacionalinė atranka ===
"Eurovizijos" dainų konkurso nacionalinė atranka (Eurovision Song Contest national selection) was the national final format developed by LRT in order to select Lithuania's entry for the Eurovision Song Contest 2017. The competition involved a ten-week-long process that commenced on 7 January 2017 and concluded with a winning song and artist on 11 March 2017. The 10 shows were hosted by Ieva Stasiulevičiūtė and Gabrielė Martirosianaitė and were broadcast on LRT televizija, LRT Lituanica and LRT Radijas as well as online via the broadcaster's website lrt.lt.

==== Format ====
The 2017 competition involved 49 entries and consisted of 10 shows. The first four shows consisted of 11 to 13 entries each and resulted in the elimination of 25 entries all together. The remaining 24 entries participated in the fifth and sixth shows where each show consisted of 12 entries and the bottom four were eliminated. The remaining 16 entries participated in the seventh and eighth show where each show consisted of eight entries and the top four advanced to the competition's semi-final. In the semi-final, two entries were eliminated and the top six proceeded to the final, while a public online repechage vote selected an additional entry for the final among six of the previously eliminated acts. In the final, the winner was selected from the remaining seven entries.

The results of each of the 10 shows were determined by the 50/50 combination of votes from a jury panel and public televoting. The ranking developed by both streams of voting was converted to points from 1-8, 10 and 12 and assigned based on the number of competing songs in the respective show. During the first six shows, the jury votes were determined by a Lithuanian jury panel only. Starting from the seventh show, the jury votes consisted of a combination of a Lithuanian panel and an international panel. The public could vote through telephone and SMS voting. Ties in all shows but the final were decided in favour of the entry that received the most votes from the public. In the final, a tie was decided in favour of the entry that was awarded the most points by the jury.

==== Competing entries ====
On 12 October 2016, LRT opened two separate submission forms: one for artists and another for songwriters to submit their songs. Artists that applied to compete with a song were required to indicate which song they wanted to compete with on their application. The submission deadline for both applications concluded on 1 December 2016. On 28 December 2016, LRT announced the 51 artists selected for the competition during a press conference. Among the artists were previous Lithuanian Eurovision contestants Sasha Song, who represented Lithuania in 2009, and Vilija Matačiūnaitė, who represented the nation in 2014. On 26 January 2017, the final changes to the list of 51 competing acts were made with the withdrawal of singers Soliaris and Ruslanas Kirilkinas.

Artist	Song	Songwriter(s)
Aistė Pilvelytė	"I'm Like a Wolf"	Aminata Savadogo, Kaspars Ansons
Alanas Chošnau	"7 Days"	Alanas Chošnau, Marco Lo Russo aka Rouge
Audrius Janonis	"Run"	Georgios Kalpakidis, Mickey Huskic, Nikos Sofis
Audrius Petrauskas	"Shine Like Gold"	David Sneddon, Simon Gitsels, Ashley Hicklin
Augustė Vedrickaitė	"It's Not Over (Not to Me)"	Augustė Vedrickaitė, Edgaras Žaltauskas, Kasparas Meginis
Benas Malakauskas	"Rolling"	Jonas Talandis, Kristupas Bubnelis
Dagna Kondratavičiūtė	"Feel It"	Kasparas Meginis, Edgaras Žaltauskas, Dagna Kondratavičiūtė, Alina Gadeikytė
Deividas Žygas	"Only You"	Deividas Žygas
Dovydas Petrošius	"Love Is Free"	Leonid Gutkin, Ashley Hicklin
Edgaras Lubys	"Could It Be?"	Edgaras Lubys
E.G.O.	"My Story"	Karolis Šliažas, Vaida Kalkauskaitė
Elvina Milkauskaitė	"Try"	Becky Jerams, Malin Johansson, Vallo Kikas
Erika Astrauskaitė	"No More"	Justinas Stanislovaitis
Evaldas Vaikasas	"Fire Kisses"	Ashley Hicklin, Kim Nowak-Zorde, Soren Pagh
Fusedmarc	"Rain of Revolution"	Viktorija Ivanovskaja, Denis Zujev, Michail Levin
Gabrielė Vilkickytė	"Jūra"	Gabrielė Vilkickytė, Kristupas Jasiulionis
Gabrielius Vagelis	"Feel Myself Free"	Gabrielius Vagelis
Golden Monkeys	"Septyni dievai"	Vilius Krivickas, Edvinas Gurevičius
Gražvydas	"Paint the Sky Blue"	Peter Karlsson
Greta Zazza	"Like I Love You"	Jonas Thander
Gytis Ivanauskas	"Get Frighten"	Marius Narbutis, Andrius Kauklys
Hit	"I Wanna Love You Tonight"	Karolis Šliažas, Vaida Kalkauskaitė
Ieva Zasimauskaitė	"You Saved Me"	Ąžuolas Paulauskas
Julija Jegorova	"Higher"	Fabian Ruben, Lars E. Carlsson
Justin3	"Streets of Vilnius"	Justinas Stanislovaitis
Kotryna Juodzevičiūtė	"Love Shadow"	Kaspars Ansons, Ashley Hicklin, Nicolas Moulin
Lawreigna	"Freedom"	Philip Bloom
Marius Petrauskas	"She's My Universe"	Roel van Velzen, Robin P. Francesco, Ashley Hicklin
Mia	"Sacrifice"	Michael James Down, Will Taylor
Milda Martinkėnaitė and Saulenė Chlevickaitė	"Paperheart"	Alan Roy Scott, Dillon Dixon, Jonas Brogger Filtenborg
Monee	"Nnn"	Elena Jurgaitytė, Viktorija Šatkutė
Neringa Šiaudikytė	"Running Out of Time"	Vytautas Bikus
Otreya	"Last Two Weeks"	Ugnė Kudlaitė
Paula	"Let U Go"	Gytis Valickas
Queens of Roses	"Fisherman"	Christopher Wortley, Mahan Moin, Kaspars Ansons
Rasa Kaušiūtė	"Fly"	Rasa Kaušiūtė
Rugilė Daujotaitė	"Perkūne ugniaveidi"	Tomas Zdanavičius, Rugilė Daujotaitė
Rūta Andruškevičiūtė	"The Way to Your Heaven"	José Juan Santana Rodríguez, Samuel Bugia Garrido
Sasha Song	"Never Felt Like This Before"	Dmitrij Šavrov, Caleb Sutton, Justin Marcellina
Shiny Raia	"All You"	Rasa Vaštakaitė
Strėlės	"Bastard"	Anna Polukord, Jekaterina Pranevič
Tadas Rimgaila and Samanta Tīna	"Tavo oda"	Stanislavas Stavickis
Valdas Lacko	"It's So Unfair"	Paulius Jasiūnas, Monika Rotomskytė
Valerija Iljinaitė	"You Made Me Glow"	Hans Olov Furberg, Karolina Furberg
Varjetė	"My Story"	Ylva Persson, Linda Persson
Vidas Bareikis and Ieva Zasimauskaitė	"I Love My Phone"	Vidas Bareikis
Vilija Matačiūnaitė	"I See the Lights"	Vilija Matačiūnaitė, Viktoras Vaupšas
Virgis Valuntonis	"Victorious"	Georgios Kalpakidis, Jonas Gladnikoff, Sara Ljunggren
Vlad Max	"I'll Never Let You Down"	Alexander Blackford Silver Darter

==== Jury members ====
The Lithuanian jury panel consisted of four members in the elimination shows and the semi-final, and six members in the final. The international jury panel in all shows consisted of three members. 11 jury members participated in the final, but only the votes of seven members were ultimately used.

Lithuanian jury members by show
Jury member	Elimination shows								Semi-final	Final	Occupation(s)
Jury member	1	2	3	4	5	6	7	8	Semi-final	Final	Occupation(s)
Dalia Ibelhauptaitė	No	No	No	No	No	No	No	Yes	Yes	Yes	director
Darius Užkuraitis	Yes	Yes	Yes	Yes	Yes	Yes	Yes	Yes	Yes	No	LRT Opus director
Donatas Montvydas	No	No	No	No	No	No	No	No	No	Yes	singer-songwriter
Gediminas Zujus	No	No	No	No	No	No	Yes	No	No	No	producer
Gintaras Rinkevičius	No	No	No	Yes	Yes	No	No	No	No	No	conductor
Justė Arlauskaitė	No	Yes	Yes	No	No	No	No	No	No	No	singer
Kazimieras Šiaulys	No	Yes	No	No	No	No	No	No	No	Yes	music critic
Neda Malūnavičiūtė	Yes	No	No	No	No	No	No	No	No	No	singer
Nomeda Kazlaus	No	No	No	No	Yes	No	Yes	Yes	No	Yes	opera singer
Povilas Meškėla	No	No	No	Yes	No	Yes	No	No	Yes	No	singer
Ramūnas Zilnys	Yes	Yes	Yes	Yes	Yes	Yes	Yes	Yes	Yes	No	music reviewer
Sigutė Stonytė	Yes	No	Yes	No	No	No	No	No	No	No	opera singer
Vytautas Lukočius	No	No	No	No	No	Yes	No	No	No	No	conductor of the Vilnius Sinfonietta orchestra

International jury members by show
Jury member	Country	Elimination shows								Semi-final	Final	Occupation(s)
Jury member	Country	1	2	3	4	5	6	7	8	Semi-final	Final	Occupation(s)
Denis Ingoldsby	United Kingdom	—N/a						Yes	Yes	Yes	Yes	producer
Lauris Reiniks	Latvia	—N/a						No	No	No	Yes	singer
Peter Freudenthaler	Germany	—N/a						No	No	No	Yes	lead singer of the group Fools Garden
Sasha Jean Baptiste	Sweden	—N/a						No	Yes	Yes	No	staging director
Sean-Poul de Fré Gress	Denmark	—N/a						Yes	No	No	No	rapper
Will Wells	United States	—N/a						Yes	Yes	Yes	No	producer, musician, touring member of Imagine Dragons

==== Shows ====
===== Elimination shows =====
The eight elimination shows of the competition aired from the LRT studios in Vilnius between 7 January and 25 February 2017. The first four shows featured the 49 competing entries, while the fifth and sixth show each featured 12 of the 24 remaining entries in the competition, and the seventh to eighth show each featured eight of the 16 remaining entries in the competition. The top six entries advanced in the first four shows, while the top eight entries advanced in the fifth and sixth show, and the top four entries advanced in the seventh and eighth show. The bottom entries were eliminated in each show.

Show 1 – 7 January 2017
R/O	Artist	Song	Jury	Televote		Total	Place
R/O	Artist	Song	Jury	Votes	Points	Total	Place
1	Justin3	"Streets of Vilnius"	1	244	2	3	11
2	Rūta Andruškevičiūtė	"The Way to Your Heaven"	0	98	0	0	12
3	Paula	"Let U Go"	5	821	12	17	3
4	Golden Monkeys	"Septyni dievai"	7	423	7	14	4
5	Augustė Vedrickaitė	"It's Not Over (Not to Me)"	3	257	3	6	8
6	Sasha Song	"Never Felt Like This Before"	10	438	8	18	2
7	Dagna Kondratavičiūtė	"Feel It"	4	172	0	4	10
8	Audrius Petrauskas	"Shine Like Gold"	5	228	1	6	9
9	Benas Malakauskas	"Rolling"	8	284	4	12	6
10	Tadas Rimgaila and Samanta Tīna	"Tavo oda"	2	290	5	7	7
11	Otreya	"Last Two Weeks"	6	390	6	12	5
12	Edgaras Lubys	"Could It Be?"	12	505	10	22	1

Show 2 – 14 January 2017
R/O	Artist	Song	Jury	Televote		Total	Place
R/O	Artist	Song	Jury	Votes	Points	Total	Place
1	E.G.O.	"My Story"	5	377	6	11	6
2	Monee	"Nnn"	3	376	5	8	7
3	Varjetė	"My Story"	0	306	0	0	12
4	Gabrielius Vagelis	"Feel Myself Free"	8	384	7	15	3
5	Ieva Zasimauskaitė	"You Saved Me"	10	361	3	13	5
6	Rugilė Daujotaitė	"Perkūne ugniaveidi"	2	362	4	6	9
7	Mia	"Sacrifice"	12	500	10	22	1
8	Deividas Žygas	"Only You"	0	42	0	0	13
9	Rasa Kaušiūtė	"Fly"	5	339	2	7	8
10	Gabrielė Vilkickytė	"Jūra"	4	313	1	5	10
11	Lawreigna	"Freedom"	1	85	0	1	11
12	Kotryna Juodzevičiūtė	"Love Shadow"	7	525	12	19	2
13	Valdas Lacko	"It's So Unfair"	6	451	8	14	4

Show 3 – 21 January 2017
R/O	Artist	Song	Jury	Televote		Total	Place
R/O	Artist	Song	Jury	Votes	Points	Total	Place
1	Gražvydas	"Paint the Sky Blue"	6	518	7	13	5
2	Fusedmarc	"Rain of Revolution"	10	401	5	15	4
3	Marius Petrauskas	"She's My Universe"	3	320	3	6	8
4	Dovydas Petrošius	"Love Is Free"	0	111	0	0	13
5	Strėlės	"Bastard"	6	361	4	10	7
6	Virgis Valuntonis	"Victorious"	0	134	0	0	12
7	Vilija Matačiūnaitė	"I See the Lights"	4	307	1	5	9
8	Milda Martinkėnaitė and Saulenė Chlevickaitė	"Paperheart"	5	485	6	11	6
9	Gytis Ivanauskas	"Get Frighten"	8	699	12	20	2
10	Hit	"I Wanna Love You Tonight"	3	233	0	3	11
11	Vidas Bareikis and Ieva Zasimauskaitė	"I Love My Phone"	7	619	8	15	3
12	Erika Astrauskaitė	"No More"	3	314	2	5	10
13	Greta Zazza	"Like I Love You"	12	648	10	22	1

Show 4 – 28 January 2017
R/O	Artist	Song	Jury	Televote		Total	Place
R/O	Artist	Song	Jury	Votes	Points	Total	Place
1	Elvina Milkauskaitė	"Try"	1	83	1	2	10
2	Julija Jegorova	"Higher"	4	142	3	7	9
3	Evaldas Vaikasas	"Fire Kisses"	3	413	7	10	6
4	Neringa Šiaudikytė	"Running Out Of Time"	8	169	4	12	5
5	Vlad Max	"I'll Never Let You Down"	0	56	0	0	11
6	Shiny Raia	"All You"	6	123	2	8	7
7	Alanas Chošnau	"7 Days"	10	495	8	18	2
8	Valerija Iljinaitė	"You Made Me Glow"	7	353	6	13	4
9	Queens of Roses	"Fisherman"	5	567	10	15	3
10	Audrius Janonis	"Run"	2	217	5	7	8
11	Aistė Pilvelytė	"I'm Like a Wolf"	12	1,016	12	24	1

Show 5 – 4 February 2017
R/O	Artist	Song	Jury	Televote		Total	Place
R/O	Artist	Song	Jury	Votes	Points	Total	Place
1	E.G.O.	"My Story"	2	442	3	5	8
2	Benas Malakauskas	"Rolling"	4	141	0	4	9
3	Otreya	"Last Two Weeks"	3	295	0	3	12
4	Edgaras Lubys	"Could It Be?"	8	472	4	12	6
5	Milda Martinkėnaitė and Saulenė Chlevickaitė	"Paperheart"	1	438	2	3	10
6	Ieva Zasimauskaitė	"You Saved Me"	12	510	6	18	2
7	Gytis Ivanauskas	"Get Frighten"	7	1,032	12	19	1
8	Valdas Lacko	"It's So Unfair"	2	302	1	3	11
9	Paula	"Let U Go"	7	980	10	17	4
10	Gražvydas	"Paint the Sky Blue"	5	689	8	13	5
11	Fusedmarc	"Rain of Revolution"	10	592	7	17	3
12	Gabrielius Vagelis	"Feel Myself Free"	6	506	5	11	7

Show 6 – 11 February 2017
R/O	Artist	Song	Jury	Televote		Total	Place
R/O	Artist	Song	Jury	Votes	Points	Total	Place
1	Sasha Song	"Never Felt Like This Before"	10	350	2	12	5
2	Valerija Iljinaitė	"You Made Me Glow"	6	440	5	11	7
3	Alanas Chošnau	"7 Days"	8	257	1	9	8
4	Greta Zazza	"Like I Love You"	10	757	8	18	2
5	Aistė Pilvelytė	"I'm Like a Wolf"	12	1,158	12	24	1
6	Evaldas Vaikasas	"Fire Kisses"	1	223	0	1	12
7	Neringa Šiaudikytė	"Running Out Of Time"	5	111	0	5	10
8	Queens of Roses	"Fisherman"	3	924	10	13	4
9	Vidas Bareikis and Ieva Zasimauskaitė	"I Love My Phone"	4	417	4	8	9
10	Kotryna Juodzevičiūtė	"Love Shadow"	7	451	7	14	3
11	Golden Monkeys	"Septyni dievai"	2	352	3	5	11
12	Mia	"Sacrifice"	6	448	6	12	6

Show 7 – 18 February 2017
R/O	Artist	Song	Jury				Televote		Total	Place
R/O	Artist	Song	Lithuanian	Intl.	Total	Points	Votes	Points	Total	Place
1	Ieva Zasimauskaitė	"You Saved Me"	8	5	13	7	1,002	7	14	4
2	E.G.O.	"My Story"	5	7	12	6	462	4	10	7
3	Greta Zazza	"Like I Love You"	10	8	18	10	1,132	8	18	3
4	Gražvydas	"Paint the Sky Blue"	4	4	8	5	420	3	8	8
5	Gytis Ivanauskas	"Get Frighten"	3	4	7	4	1,539	10	14	5
6	Aistė Pilvelytė	"I'm Like a Wolf"	12	6	18	10	1,711	12	22	1
7	Edgaras Lubys	"Could It Be?"	6	10	16	8	503	5	13	6
8	Sasha Song	"Never Felt Like This Before"	7	12	19	12	989	6	18	2

Detailed Lithuanian Jury Votes
R/O	Song	R. Zilnys	D. Užkuraitis	N. Kazlaus	G. Zujus	Total	Points
1	"You Saved Me"	7	7	8	10	32	8
2	"My Story"	4	5	3	8	20	5
3	"Like I Love You"	10	10	10	7	37	10
4	"Paint the Sky Blue"	5	4	5	5	19	4
5	"Get Frighten"	3	3	4	3	13	3
6	"I'm Like a Wolf"	12	12	12	12	48	12
7	"Could It Be?"	6	6	7	4	23	6
8	"Never Felt Like This Before"	8	8	6	6	28	7

Detailed International Jury Votes
R/O	Song	W. Wells	D. Ingoldsby	S. de Fré Gress	Total	Points
1	"You Saved Me"	3	5	7	15	5
2	"My Story"	8	6	6	20	7
3	"Like I Love You"	6	8	10	24	8
4	"Paint the Sky Blue"	7	3	4	14	4
5	"Get Frighten"	5	4	5	14	4
6	"I'm Like a Wolf"	4	10	3	17	6
7	"Could It Be?"	10	12	8	30	10
8	"Never Felt Like This Before"	12	7	12	31	12

Show 8 – 25 February 2017
R/O	Artist	Song	Jury				Televote		Total	Place
R/O	Artist	Song	Lithuanian	Intl.	Total	Points	Votes	Points	Total	Place
1	Alanas Chošnau	"7 Days"	7	3	10	5	850	5	10	7
2	Paula	"Let U Go"	6	10	16	8	1,365	10	18	3
3	Gabrielius Vagelis	"Feel Myself Free"	10	12	22	12	1,082	8	20	2
4	Queens of Roses	"Fisherman"	4	6	10	5	1,009	6	11	6
5	Kotryna Juodzevičiūtė	"Love Shadow"	8	8	16	8	1,072	7	15	4
6	Mia	"Sacrifice"	5	7	12	7	502	4	11	5
7	Fusedmarc	"Rain of Revolution"	12	5	17	10	1,777	12	22	1
8	Valerija Iljinaitė	"You Made Me Glow"	7	4	11	6	477	3	9	8

Detailed Lithuanian Jury Votes
R/O	Song	R. Zilnys	N. Kazlaus	D. Užkuraitis	D. Ibelhauptaitė	Total	Points
1	"7 Days"	8	8	6	4	26	7
2	"Let U Go"	4	5	8	6	23	6
3	"Feel Myself Free"	7	12	10	8	37	10
4	"Fisherman"	3	3	3	3	12	4
5	"Love Shadow"	10	6	7	10	33	8
6	"Sacrifice"	6	4	5	5	20	5
7	"Rain of Revolution"	12	7	12	12	43	12
8	"You Made Me Glow"	5	10	4	7	26	7

Detailed International Jury Votes
R/O	Song	W. Wells	D. Ingoldsby	S. J. Baptiste	Total	Points
1	"7 Days"	3	3	7	13	3
2	"Let U Go"	10	4	10	24	10
3	"Feel Myself Free"	12	12	12	36	12
4	"Fisherman"	6	6	6	18	6
5	"Love Shadow"	8	7	8	23	8
6	"Sacrifice"	5	10	5	20	7
7	"Rain of Revolution"	7	5	4	16	5
8	"You Made Me Glow"	4	8	3	15	4

===== Semi-final =====
The semi-final of the competition aired from the LRT studios in Vilnius on 4 March 2017 and featured the remaining eight entries that qualified from the eighth show. The show was filmed on 28 February 2017. The top six entries advanced to the final, while the bottom two were eliminated.

Semi-final – 4 March 2017
R/O	Artist	Song	Jury				Televote		Total	Place
R/O	Artist	Song	Lithuanian	Intl.	Total	Points	Votes	Points	Total	Place
1	Sasha Song	"Never Felt Like This Before"	6	6	12	5	1,118	3	8	7
2	Ieva Zasimauskaitė	"You Saved Me"	3	5	8	4	1,121	4	8	8
3	Paula	"Let U Go"	4	10	14	6	2,048	8	14	5
4	Aistė Pilvelytė	"I'm Like a Wolf"	10	4	14	6	2,257	10	16	2
5	Kotryna Juodzevičiūtė	"Love Shadow"	8	8	16	8	1,593	7	15	4
6	Fusedmarc	"Rain of Revolution"	12	7	19	12	2,379	12	24	1
7	Gabrielius Vagelis	"Feel Myself Free"	5	12	17	10	1,464	5	15	3
8	Greta Zazza	"Like I Love You"	7	8	15	7	1,509	6	13	6

Detailed Lithuanian Jury Votes
R/O	Song	R. Zilnys	D. Ibelhauptaitė	P. Meškėla	D. Užkuraitis	Total	Points
1	"Never Felt Like This Before"	7	3	6	7	23	6
2	"You Saved Me"	4	4	5	3	16	3
3	"Let U Go"	3	7	4	6	20	4
4	"I'm Like a Wolf"	8	5	12	10	35	10
5	"Love Shadow"	10	8	7	8	33	8
6	"Rain of Revolution"	12	12	10	12	46	12
7	"Feel Myself Free"	5	10	3	4	22	5
8	"Like I Love You"	6	6	8	5	25	7

Detailed International Jury Votes
R/O	Song	W. Wells	D. Ingoldsby	S. J. Baptiste	Total	Points
1	"Never Felt Like This Before"	12	3	4	19	6
2	"You Saved Me"	6	4	6	16	5
3	"Let U Go"	10	5	10	25	10
4	"I'm Like a Wolf"	3	7	3	13	4
5	"Love Shadow"	8	6	8	22	8
6	"Rain of Revolution"	4	12	5	21	7
7	"Feel Myself Free"	7	8	12	27	12
8	"Like I Love You"	5	10	7	22	8

===== Online repechage =====
The entries placed fifth and sixth in the seventh and eighth elimination shows as well as the bottom two entries of the semi-final were voted upon by the public through LRT's internet voting platform on 6 March 2017. "Get Frighten" performed by Gytis Ivanauskas advanced to the final after receiving the most votes.

Online repechage – 6 March 2017
R/O	Artist	Song	Votes	Place
1	Sasha Song	"Never Felt Like This Before"	5,755	2
2	Edgaras Lubys	"Could It Be?"	1,735	4
3	Gytis Ivanauskas	"Get Frighten"	7,495	1
4	Mia	"Sacrifice"	800	5
5	Ieva Zasimauskaitė	"You Saved Me"	2,014	3
6	Queens of Roses	"Fisherman"	598	6

===== Final =====
The final of the competition took place on 11 March 2017 at the Švyturys Arena in Klaipėda and featured the remaining seven entries that qualified from the semi-final and the online repechage. The final was the only show in the competition to be broadcast live; all other preceding shows were pre-recorded earlier in the week before their airdates. "Rain of Revolution" performed by Fusedmarc was selected as the winner after gaining the most points from both the jury vote and the public vote. In addition to the performances of the competing entries, Donatas Montvydas opened the show with the song "Screw Me Up" and the 2016 Lithuanian entry "I've Been Waiting for This Night", and SunStroke Project performed the 2017 Moldovan entry "Hey, Mamma!" as the interval act.

Final – 11 March 2017
R/O	Artist	Song	Jury		Televote		Total	Place
R/O	Artist	Song	Votes	Points	Votes	Points	Total	Place
1	Paula	"Let U Go"	44	5	4,240	6	11	7
2	Gabrielius Vagelis	"Feel Myself Free"	49	7	2,223	4	11	5
3	Greta Zazza	"Like I Love You"	48	6	3,225	5	11	6
4	Fusedmarc	"Rain of Revolution"	72	12	15,324	12	24	1
5	Aistė Pilvelytė	"I'm Like a Wolf"	52	8	14,438	10	18	2
6	Gytis Ivanauskas	"Get Frighten"	30	4	5,356	8	12	4
7	Kotryna Juodzevičiūtė	"Love Shadow"	69	10	4,309	7	17	3

Detailed Jury Votes
R/O	Song	K. Šiaulys	D. Ibelhauptaitė	L. Reiniks	P. Freudenthaler	N. Kazlaus	D. Montvydas	D. Ingoldsby	Total
1	"Let U Go"	6	7	7	6	5	7	6	44
2	"Feel Myself Free"	4	8	6	7	10	6	8	49
3	"Like I Love You"	7	4	5	5	7	10	10	48
4	"Rain of Revolution"	8	12	10	12	6	12	12	72
5	"I'm Like a Wolf"	12	6	8	8	8	5	5	52
6	"Get Frighten"	5	5	4	4	4	4	4	30
7	"Love Shadow"	10	10	12	10	12	8	7	69

=== Promotion ===
Fusedmarc made several appearances across Europe to specifically promote "Rain of Revolution" as the Lithuanian Eurovision entry. Between 3 and 6 April, Fusedmarc took part in promotional activities in Tel Aviv, Israel where she performed during the Israel Calling event held at the Ha'teatron venue. On 8 April, Fusedmarc performed during the Eurovision in Concert event which was held at the Melkweg venue in Amsterdam, Netherlands and hosted by Cornald Maas and Selma Björnsdóttir. On 15 April, Fusedmarc performed during the Eurovision Spain Pre-Party, which was held at the Sala La Riviera venue in Madrid, Spain.

== At Eurovision ==
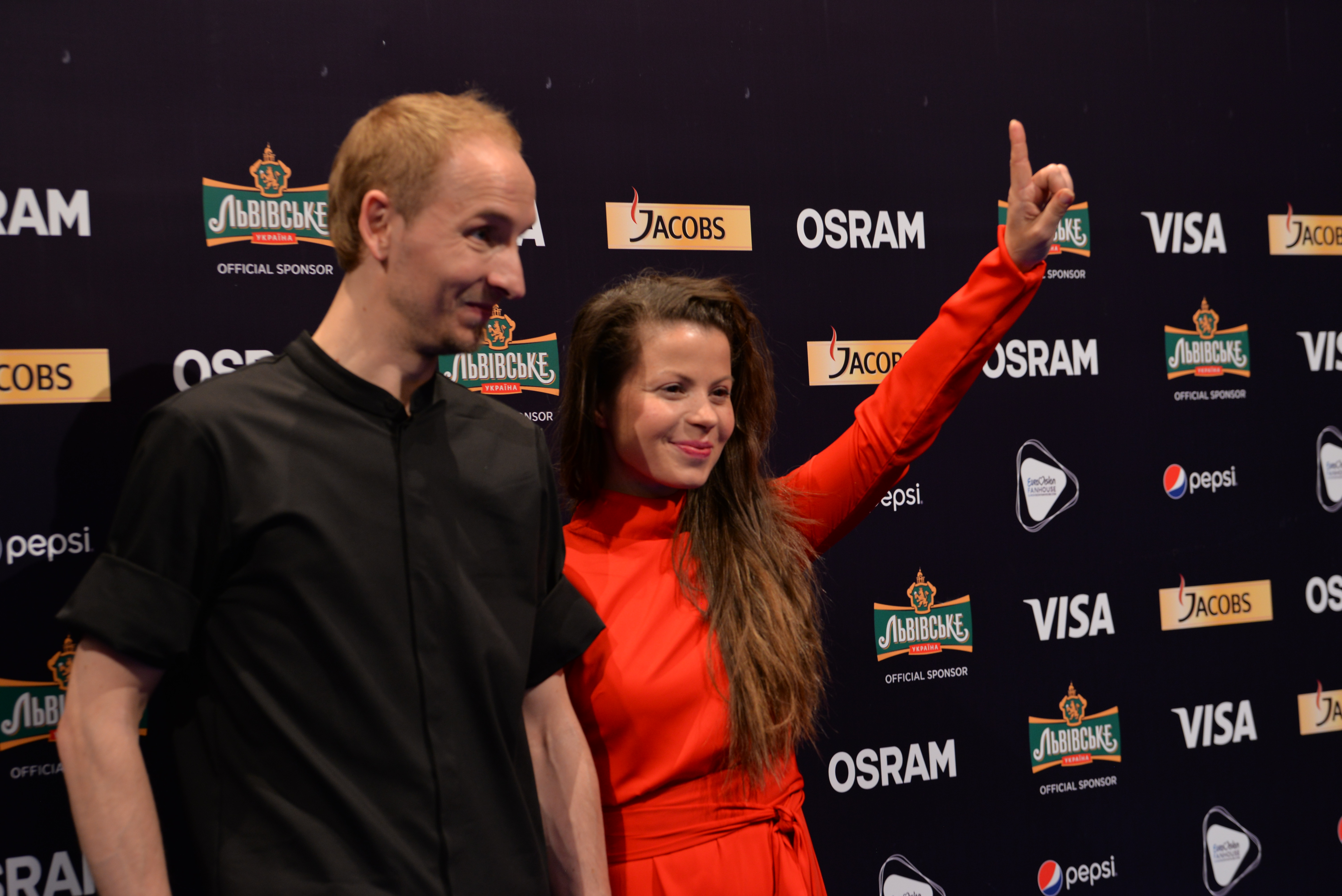
Fusedmarc during a press meet and greet

According to Eurovision rules, all nations with the exceptions of the host country and the "Big Five" (France, Germany, Italy, Spain and the United Kingdom) are required to qualify from one of two semi-finals in order to compete for the final; the top ten countries from each semi-final progress to the final. The European Broadcasting Union (EBU) split up the competing countries into six different pots based on voting patterns from previous contests, with countries with favourable voting histories put into the same pot. On 31 January 2017, an allocation draw was held which placed each country into one of the two semi-finals, as well as which half of the show they would perform in. Lithuania was placed into the second semi-final, held on 11 May 2017, and was scheduled to perform in the second half of the show.

Once all the competing songs for the 2017 contest had been released, the running order for the semi-finals was decided by the shows' producers rather than through another draw, so that similar songs were not placed next to each other. Lithuania was set to perform in position 16, following the entry from Bulgaria and before the entry from Estonia.

The two semi-finals and final were broadcast in Lithuania on LRT, LRT HD and LRT Radijas with commentary by Darius Užkuraitis and Gerūta Griniūtė. The Lithuanian spokesperson, who announced the top 12-point score awarded by the Lithuanian jury during the final, was Eglė Daugėlaitė.

=== Semi-final ===
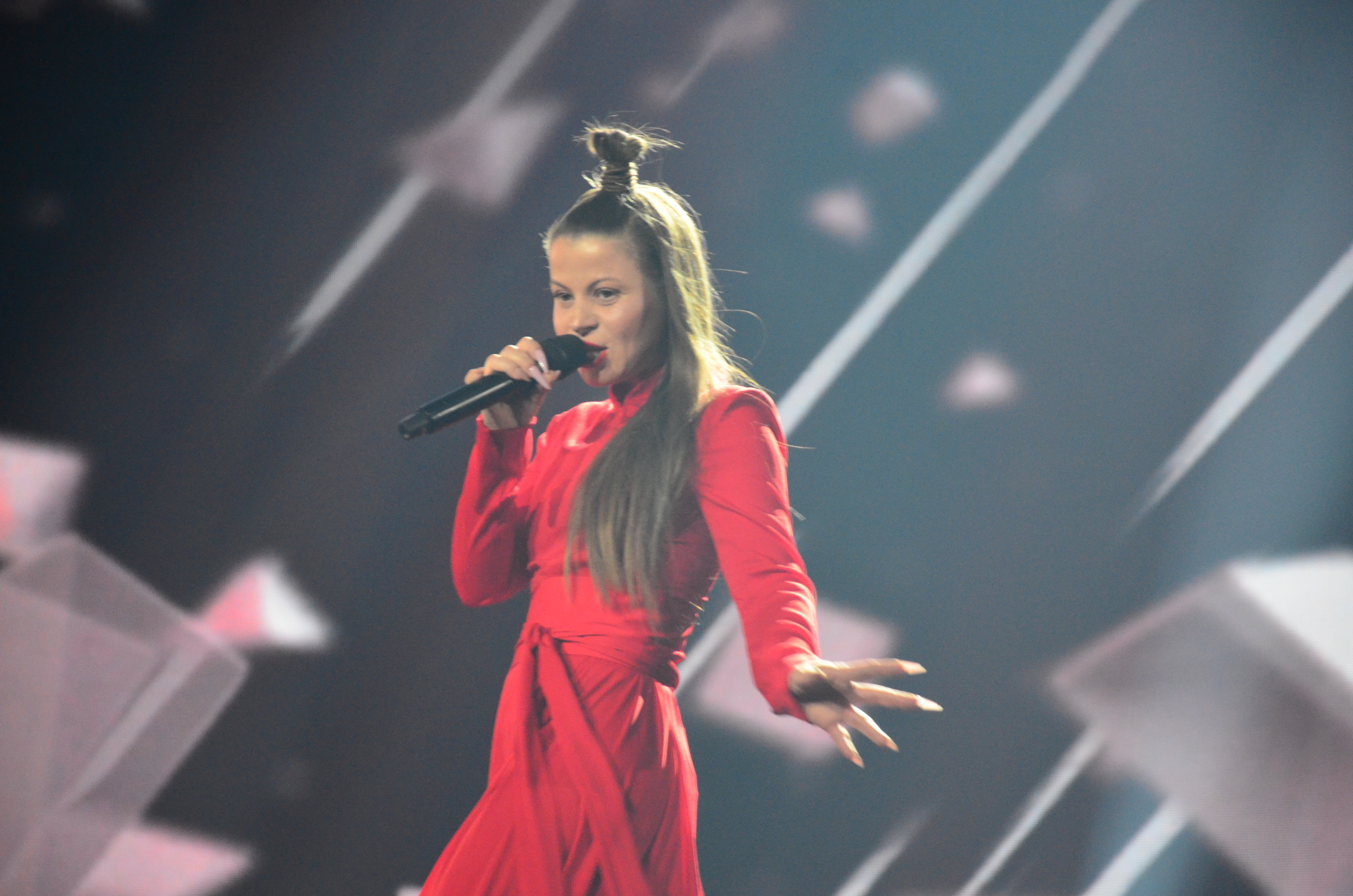
Fusedmarc during a rehearsal before the second semi-final

Fusedmarc took part in technical rehearsals on 2 and 5 May, followed by dress rehearsals on 10 and 11 May. This included the jury show on 10 May where the professional juries of each country watched and voted on the competing entries.

The Lithuanian performance featured the members of Fusedmarc performing on stage with red stage colours and the LED screens and floor displaying a heartbeat during the first chorus and a ring of fire towards the end. Lead singer Viktorija Ivanovskaja wore a red dress while Denis Zujev was dressed in black. The performance also featured a camera shot from above the stage to display the ring of fire on the LED screens and floor. Fusedmarc was joined by four backing vocalists on stage: Jekaterina Fiodorova, Kristina Žaldokaitė, Laura Rakauskaitė and Vaiva Adomaitytė.

At the end of the show, Lithuania was not announced among the top 10 entries in the second semi-final and therefore failed to qualify to compete in the final. It was later revealed that Lithuania placed seventeenth in the semi-final, receiving a total of 42 points: 25 points from the televoting and 17 points from the juries.

=== Voting ===
Voting during the three shows involved each country awarding two sets of points from 1-8, 10 and 12: one from their professional jury and the other from televoting. Each nation's jury consisted of five music industry professionals who are citizens of the country they represent, with their names published before the contest to ensure transparency. This jury judged each entry based on: vocal capacity; the stage performance; the song's composition and originality; and the overall impression by the act. In addition, no member of a national jury was permitted to be related in any way to any of the competing acts in such a way that they cannot vote impartially and independently. The individual rankings of each jury member as well as the nation's televoting results were released shortly after the grand final.

Below is a breakdown of points awarded to Lithuania and awarded by Lithuania in the second semi-final and grand final of the contest, and the breakdown of the jury voting and televoting conducted during the two shows:

==== Points awarded to Lithuania ====
Points awarded to Lithuania (Semi-final 2)
Score	Televote	Jury
12 points	Ireland	
10 points	Norway	
8 points		
7 points		Belarus
6 points		San Marino
5 points		
4 points		Macedonia
3 points		
2 points		
1 point	Belarus; Estonia; Ukraine	

==== Points awarded by Lithuania ====
Points awarded by Lithuania (Semi-final 2)
Score	Televote	Jury
12 points	Estonia	Norway
10 points	Bulgaria	Bulgaria
8 points	Belarus	Ireland
7 points	Norway	Switzerland
6 points	Romania	Denmark
5 points	Hungary	Netherlands
4 points	Ireland	Austria
3 points	Israel	Belarus
2 points	Croatia	Hungary
1 point	Switzerland	Malta

Points awarded by Lithuania (Final)
Score	Televote	Jury
12 points	Portugal	Portugal
10 points	Belgium	Norway
8 points	Moldova	Italy
7 points	Bulgaria	Bulgaria
6 points	Norway	Sweden
5 points	Italy	Austria
4 points	Romania	Belgium
3 points	Sweden	Armenia
2 points	Hungary	Netherlands
1 point	Belarus	Australia

==== Detailed voting results ====
The following members comprised the Lithuanian jury:

- Vytenis Pauliukaitis (jury chairperson) – television and entertainment director
- Giedrė Kilčiauskienė – singer
- Viktorija Navickaitė – journalist
- Rafailas Karpis – singer
- Vaidas Stackevičius – music producer

Detailed voting results from Lithuania (Semi-final 2)
R/O	Country	Jury							Televote	
R/O	Country	V. Pauliukaitis	G. Kilčiauskienė	V. Navickaitė	R. Karpis	V. Stackevičius	Rank	Points	Rank	Points
01	Serbia	15	10	12	15	14	15		17	
02	Austria	13	6	3	9	2	7	4	12	
03	Macedonia	17	11	13	14	15	16		14	
04	Malta	14	8	11	6	12	10	1	15	
05	Romania	3	16	17	17	9	14		5	6
06	Netherlands	11	3	9	2	5	6	5	11	
07	Hungary	16	9	5	10	10	9	2	6	5
08	Denmark	2	7	7	4	8	5	6	13	
09	Ireland	4	4	4	1	11	3	8	7	4
10	San Marino	12	15	16	16	17	17		16	
11	Croatia	10	17	10	13	7	12		9	2
12	Norway	1	1	1	3	1	1	12	4	7
13	Switzerland	5	5	6	5	4	4	7	10	1
14	Belarus	6	14	15	8	6	8	3	3	8
15	Bulgaria	8	2	2	7	3	2	10	2	10
16	Lithuania									
17	Estonia	9	13	14	12	13	13		1	12
18	Israel	7	12	8	11	16	11		8	3

Detailed voting results from Lithuania (Final)
R/O	Country	Jury							Televote	
R/O	Country	V. Pauliukaitis	G. Kilčiauskienė	V. Navickaitė	R. Karpis	V. Stackevičius	Rank	Points	Rank	Points
01	Israel	9	15	19	12	25	16		15	
02	Poland	14	13	14	11	20	13		11	
03	Belarus	7	21	24	13	14	15		10	1
04	Austria	8	7	8	7	12	6	5	21	
05	Armenia	5	9	12	14	10	8	3	19	
06	Netherlands	12	8	16	6	13	9	2	20	
07	Moldova	21	23	6	10	16	14		3	8
08	Hungary	26	24	11	18	9	17		9	2
09	Italy	4	3	3	5	5	3	8	6	5
10	Denmark	11	12	13	8	17	11		23	
11	Portugal	1	1	1	1	1	1	12	1	12
12	Azerbaijan	15	17	10	17	7	12		17	
13	Croatia	22	25	20	22	6	22		14	
14	Australia	17	10	9	9	15	10	1	13	
15	Greece	16	22	25	21	26	25		26	
16	Spain	20	16	15	24	22	23		25	
17	Norway	3	2	2	2	2	2	10	5	6
18	United Kingdom	19	14	17	20	24	20		22	
19	Cyprus	10	20	22	19	19	18		18	
20	Romania	23	26	23	25	11	24		7	4
21	Germany	24	11	18	15	23	19		24	
22	Ukraine	18	19	21	16	21	21		16	
23	Belgium	6	6	5	23	3	7	4	2	10
24	Sweden	13	5	4	3	4	5	6	8	3
25	Bulgaria	2	4	7	4	8	4	7	4	7
26	France	25	18	26	26	18	26		12	
