= Run with the Lions =

2019 song by Jurij Veklenko

Single by Jurij Veklenko

from the album Mano Sapnuose
- Released: 1 April 2019
- Length: 3:00
- Label: UAB Gyva Muzika
- Songwriters: Ashley Hicklin; Eric Lumiere; Pele Loriano

Jurij Veklenko singles chronology
"Kartais" (2018)	"Run with the Lions" (2019)	"Skirtingi Pasauliai" (2019)

Eurovision Song Contest 2019 entry
- Country: Lithuania
- Artist: Jurij Veklenko
- Language: English
- Composers: Ashley Hicklin; Eric Lumiere; Pele Loriano
- Lyricists: Ashley Hicklin; Eric Lumiere; Pele Loriano

Finals performance
- Semi-final result: 11th
- Semi-final points: 93
- Final result: Did not qualify

Entry chronology
- ◄ "When We're Old" (2018)
- "On Fire" (2020) ►

"Run with the Lions" is a song by Lithuanian singer Jurij Veklenko (previously known as Jurijus). It represented Lithuania in the Eurovision Song Contest 2019. A revamped version of the song was released on 3 April 2019. It was performed during the second semi-final on 16 May 2019, and missed qualifying for the final by 1 point.

== Eurovision Song Contest ==
The song represented Lithuania in the Eurovision Song Contest 2019, after Jurij Veklenko was selected through "Eurovizijos" dainų konkurso nacionalinė atranka, the Lithuanian national selection which selected Lithuania's entry for the Eurovision Song Contest. On 28 January 2019, a special allocation draw was held which placed each country into one of the two semi-finals, as well as which half of the show they would perform in. Lithuania was placed into the second semi-final, to be held on 16 May 2019, and was scheduled to perform in the second half of the show. Once all the competing songs for the 2019 contest had been released, the running order for the semi-finals was decided by the show's producers rather than through another draw, so that similar songs were not placed next to each other. Lithuania performed in position 12, obtaining 93 points from the public and jury, but missed qualifying for the final by a mere 1 point difference, ranking the 11th.

== Music video ==
The music video for "Run with the Lions" was released through the official Eurovision YouTube channel on 24 February 2019.

== Charts ==
Chart (2019)	Peak position
Lithuania (AGATA)	29
