= Ashley Hicklin =

English singer, songwriter, and record producer

- Born: Ashley Hicklin; 1985 (age 40–41)
- Origin: Scarborough, North Yorkshire, England
- Genres: Pop
- Occupations: Singer-songwriter, record producer
- Instruments: Vocals, guitar, piano
- Years active: 1999–present
- Labels: EMI (2008–present); Warner Music (2010–present)
- Website: unified-songs.com

Ashley Hicklin (born 1985) is an English singer, songwriter, and record producer. He co-owns Unified-Songs, a UK based music publishing/management company and has written songs for artists such as Tiësto, Oliver Heldens, R3hab, Hardwell, Timmy Trumpet, Lost Kings, Feder, Duncan Laurence, Mylène Farmer and Waylon, including more than ten No.1 chart releases and over twenty Top-10 chart releases.

== Biography ==
=== Early life ===
Ashley Hicklin was raised in his parents' pub on the North-East coast of England in Scarborough, North Yorkshire. He first began as a singer-songwriter performing at open mic nights in the pub, at the age of 13.

=== As a writer ===
In 2008, the European CEO of EMI Publishing (Peter Ende) saw a live video of Hicklin performing for BBC Introducing. Hicklin signed a deal with EMI Publishing and in less than six months had co-written several chart hits for other artists across Europe, including Johan Palm's single Emma-Lee which reached No. 1 in Sweden.

Hicklin went on to collaborate with the teams behind Lana Del Rey, Felix Jaehn, Tiësto, Natasha Bedingfield, James Morrison, Hurts, Amy Winehouse, Sugababes and various other international acts. Hicklin has maintained an active presence in the dance music scene as a writer and vocalist under the moniker Bright Sparks. Notable releases include the Tiësto song On My Way, the Hardwell song Summer Air, the Feder song Keep Us Apart, the Oliver Heldens song Somebody, the Klingande song Messiah, the Timmy Trumpet song Friday and Lost Kings release Feather.

==== Eurovision Song Contest entries ====
Hicklin has written the following Eurovision Song Contest entries:

Year	Country	Song	Artist	Co-written with	Final	Points	Semi	Points
2010	Belgium	"Me and My Guitar"	Tom Dice	Tom Eeckhout, Jeroen Swinnen	6	143	1	167
2014	Belgium	"Mother"	Axel Hirsoux	Rafael Artesero	Failed to qualify		14	28
2019	Lithuania	"Run with the Lions"	Jurij Veklenko	Eric Lumiere, Pele Loriano	Failed to qualify		11	93
2020	Spain	"Universo"	Blas Cantó	Blas Cantó, Dan Hammond, Dangelo Ortega, Mikołaj Trybulec	Contest cancelled			
2021	Austria	"Amen"	Vincent Bueno	Tobias Carshey, Jonas Thander	Failed to qualify		12	66
2022	Poland	"River"	Ochman	Krystian Ochman, Adam Wiśniewski, Mikołaj Trybulec	12	151	6	198
2023	Switzerland	"Watergun"	Remo Forrer	Argyle Singh, Mikołaj Trybulec	20	92	7	97

In 2018, Hicklin co-wrote two songs for the British national selection Eurovision: You Decide. "You", performed by Jaz Ellington and "Astronaut", performed by Liam Tamne. In 2024, he co-wrote "Tears like Rain", performed by Bodine Monet, for the German national final.

=== As a publisher ===
In 2015, Hicklin co-founded Unified Songs, an independent music publisher and management company based in Edinburgh. They have residential recordings studios where they regularly host songwriting camps.
