= Lithuania in the Eurovision Song Contest 2004 =

- Eurovision Song Contest 2004
- Participating broadcaster: Lietuvos radijas ir televizija (LRT)
- Country: Lithuania
- Selection process: "Eurovizijos" dainų konkurso nacionalinė atranka
- Selection date: 14 February 2004

Competing entry
- Song: "What's Happened to Your Love?"
- Artist: Linas and Simona
- Songwriters: Michalis Antoniou; Linas Adomaitis; Camden-MS

Placement
- Semi-final result: Failed to qualify (16th)

Participation chronology

Lithuania was represented at the Eurovision Song Contest 2004 with the song "What's Happened to Your Love?", composed by Michalis Antoniou and Linas Adomaitis, with lyrics by Camden-MS, and performed by Linas and Simona. The Lithuanian participating broadcaster, Lietuvos radijas ir televizija (LRT), organised the national final "Eurovizijos" dainų konkurso nacionalinė atranka in order to select its entry for the contest. The broadcaster returned to the contest after a one-year absence following its relegation from 2003 as one of the bottom five entrants in 2002. The national final took place over seven weeks and involved 52 competing entries. In the final, eighteen entries remained and "What's Happened to Your Love?" performed by Linas and Simona was selected as the winner by the combination of votes from a jury panel and a public vote.

Lithuania competed in the semi-final of the Eurovision Song Contest which took place on 12 May 2004. Performing during the show in position 12, "What's Happened to Your Love?" was not announced among the top 10 entries of the semi-final and therefore did not qualify to compete in the final. It was later revealed that Lithuania placed sixteenth out of the 22 participating countries in the semi-final with 26 points.

== Background ==
Prior to the 2004 contest, Lietuvos radijas ir televizija (LRT) had participated in the Eurovision Song Contest representing Lithuania four times since its first entry in 1994. Its best placing in the contest was thirteenth, achieved in 2001 with the song "You Got Style" performed by Skamp. In 2002, "Happy You" performed by Aivaras scored 12 points and placed 23rd.

As part of its duties as participating broadcaster, LRT organises the selection of its entry in the Eurovision Song Contest and broadcasts the event in the country. Other than the internal selection of its debut entry in 1994, the broadcaster has selected its entry consistently through a national final procedure. LRT confirmed its intentions to participate at the 2004 contest on 1 October 2003 and announced the organization of "Eurovizijos" dainų konkurso nacionalinė atranka, which would be the national final to select its entry.

== Before Eurovision ==
=== "Eurovizijos" dainų konkurso nacionalinė atranka ===
"Eurovizijos" dainų konkurso nacionalinė atranka (Eurovision Song Contest national selection) was the national final format developed by LRT in order to select its entry for the Eurovision Song Contest 2004. The competition involved a seven-week-long process that commenced on 3 January 2004 and concluded with a winning song and artist on 14 February 2004. The seven shows were broadcast on LTV and LTV2, as well as online via the broadcaster's website lrt.lt.

==== Format ====
The 2004 competition involved 52 entries and consisted of seven shows. The first six shows were the semi-finals, consisting of seven or nine entries each. Nine entries participated in each of the first five semi-finals, resulting in the top three of each show proceeding to the final, while seven entries participated in the sixth semi-final, resulting in the top two proceeding to the final. The highest scoring non-qualifying act in the semi-finals also advanced to the final. The results of the semi-finals were determined solely by public televoting. In the final, the winner was selected from the remaining eighteen entries by the 50/50 combination of votes from a jury panel and public televoting. Ties were decided in favour of the entry that received the most votes from the public, however, a tie for the first place would be decided by the jury. The public could vote through telephone and SMS voting in all shows, with the addition of online and postcard voting during the semi-finals.

==== Competing entries ====
LRT opened a submission period on 1 October 2003 for artists and songwriters to submit their entries with the deadline on 1 December 2003. On 29 December 2003, LRT announced the 54 entries selected for the competition from over 70 submissions received. The final changes to the list of 54 competing acts were later made with the withdrawal of the songs "Skrydis" performed by Humanoidai and H. Grigorian, and "Vel" performed by Toys.

==== Semi-finals ====
The seven semi-finals of the competition aired from the LRT studios in Vilnius between 3 January and 7 February 2004, hosted by Aurimas Dautartas and Darius Užkuraitis, and featured the 52 competing entries. In each of the first five semi-finals, the top three advanced to the final, while the top two entries of the sixth semi-final advanced to the final. "I Do, I Do" performed by Geltona also proceeded to the final as the highest scoring non-qualifying act in the semi-finals.

Semi-final 1 – 3 January 2004
R/O	Artist	Song	Televote	Place
1	InCulto	"You Don't Know"	141	5
2	Aira and Bugs Band	"Come to the World"	50	8
3	Kes	"Just Be My Star"	290	3
4	No One	"Why Are You the One"	41	9
5	Dinamika	"Day and Night"	88	6
6	Relanium	"Just Be"	304	2
7	Dvyniai	"4 You"	201	4
8	Mushkitakta	"Heart Invader"	103	6
9	Rūta Ščiogolevaitė	"Over"	1,602	1

Semi-final 2 – 10 January 2004
R/O	Artist	Song	Televote	Place
1	Artis and Bugs Band	"Brave Step"	191	5
2	Lawry	"No More"	333	3
3	Graffiti	"New Day"	45	8
4	Audronė Girkontaitė	"Ei, praeivi"	22	9
5	Colder	"Follow"	290	4
6	The Road Band	"That's What I Want"	147	7
7	Taja and Merlin	"How About You?"	386	2
8	Ieva Breivytė	"On the Last Night"	174	6
9	Mantas	"Morning"	784	1

Semi-final 3 – 17 January 2004
R/O	Artist	Song	Televote	Place
1	Sati	"Love Is…"	151	7
2	Weekends	"If You Can Fly"	84	8
3	Saulės kliošas	"Stobidubap"	561	2
4	Mad Man Moon	"Sleeping"	244	6
5	Net Profit	"Waiting"	55	9
6	N.E.O	"Wider Space"	503	3
7	V.I.P.	"Look Into My Eyes"	392	4
8	Fate	"Say Goodbye"	369	5
9	Linas and Simona	"What's Happened to Your Love?"	1,182	1

Semi-final 4 – 24 January 2004
R/O	Artist	Song	Televote	Place
1	Geltona	"I Do, I Do"	732	4
2	Ričardas Vitkus	"The Girl from Million"	84	6
3	Aistė Pilvelytė	"Amor (te quiero aqui)"	878	3
4	Torres	"Mes skrendam"	25	9
5	Swajus	"Like Falling Rain"	84	6
6	Edmundas Kučinskas	"Hey, Hey Golden Ray"	2,618	1
7	Lyga	"Freedom Is Near"	197	5
8	Soft Rain	"Aš tavyje"	28	8
9	Eva	"Be My Baby"	900	2

Semi-final 5 – 31 January 2004
R/O	Artist	Song	Televote	Place
1	Dreams	"Taste of Love"	420	6
2	Indraya	"Deep In My Heart"	1,080	3
3	Rasa Kaušiūtė	"He Forgot That I'm His Baby"	1,564	2
4	Artas	"Keep Your Faith"	579	4
5	Cappella A	"Music's World"	201	9
6	Rūta Lukoševičiūtė	"Flying People"	572	5
7	Tequila for You	"Together"	304	8
8	Amberlife	"In Your Eyes"	10,219	1
9	Agnieška	"Vėjas"	345	7

Semi-final 6 – 7 February 2004
R/O	Artist	Song	Televote	Place
1	Donalda	"I Can"	254	4
2	Bracelet	"You Like"	72	6
3	Violeta Riaubiškyte	"Song About You and Me"	842	2
4	Sugarfree	"Stay Away"	227	5
5	Atika	"Back in Europe"	304	3
6	B'Avarija	"I Know"	1,341	1
7	M.T.	"Būk arti"	35	7

==== Final ====
The final of the competition took place on 14 February 2004 at the Kaunas Sports Hall in Kaunas and was hosted by Aurimas Dautarta and Greta Sapkaitė. The members of the jury consisted of Jonas Jučas (member of Seimas, organiser of the Kaunas Jazz festival), Rosita Čivilytė (singer), Vytautas Juozapaitis (opera singer), Daiva Rinkevičiūtė (Lietuvos rytas journalist), Ramūnas Zilnys (Lietuvos rytas journalist), Darius Užkuraitis (Lietuvos Radijas music producer), Edita Vilčiauskienė (Lietuvos Radijas music editor), and Jonas Vilimas (LRT music producer). The show featured the remaining eighteen entries that qualified from the semi-finals and the combined points from the jury vote and the public vote resulted in a tie between Edmundas Kucinskas, Linas and Simona, and Rūta Ščiogolevaitė. The tie was resolved after each jury member cast one vote for one of the three songs, and "What's Happened to Your Love?" performed by Linas and Simona was selected as the winner after receiving the most votes. Four of the jury members voted for Linas and Simona, while three voted for Rūta Ščiogolevaitė and one voted for Edmundas Kučinskas.

Final – 14 February 2004
R/O	Artist	Song	Songwriter(s)	Jury	Televote		Total	Place
R/O	Artist	Song	Songwriter(s)	Jury	Votes	Points	Total	Place
1	Geltona	"I Do, I Do"	Laimonas Žiulpa	0	167	0	0	13
2	Rasa Kaušiūtė	"He Forgot That I'm His Baby"	Rasa Kaušiūtė, Jonas Krivickas	3	63	0	3	9
3	Lawry	"No More"	Raigardas Tautkus, Lawry	0	38	0	0	13
4	N.E.O	"Wider Space"	Raigardas Tautkus, Tom Chadar	0	185	1	1	11
5	Aistė Pilvelytė	"Amor (te quiero aqui)"	Carlos Coelho, Nelson Silva, Marjorie	1	63	0	1	11
6	Relanium	"Just Be"	Laura Čepukaitė	0	103	0	0	13
7	Linas and Simona	"What's Happened to Your Love?"	Michalis Antoniou, Linas Adomaitis, Camden-MS	10	1,893	8	18	1
8	B'Avarija	"I Know"	Deivydas Zvonkus	7	997	7	14	4
9	Kes	"Just Be My Star"	Kęstutis Navickas	0	47	0	0	13
10	Rūta Ščiogolevaitė	"Over"	Timo Vendt, Reno Hekkonens, Lauri Laubre	12	636	6	18	1
11	Indraya	"Deep In My Heart"	Indrė Zaleskytė	0	62	0	0	13
12	Taja and Merlin	"How About You?"	Rod K.	0	132	0	0	13
13	Eva	"Be My Baby"	Georgios Kalpakidis	0	278	2	2	10
14	Amberlife	"In Your Eyes"	Bobby Ljunggren, Marcos Ubeda, William "Billy" Butt	2	5,683	12	14	4
15	Edmundas Kučinskas	"Hey, Hey Golden Ray"	Edmundas Kučinskas, Tautvyda Marcinkevičiūtė	8	3,425	10	18	1
16	Violeta Riaubiškyte	"Song About You and Me"	Aurelijus Ščiuka, Violeta Riaubiškytė	5	372	5	10	6
17	Saulės kliošas	"Stobidubap"	Saulės kliošas	6	348	4	10	6
18	Mantas	"Morning"	Vaiko Eplik	4	281	3	7	8

Tie-breaking round – 14 February 2004
Artist	Song	Votes	Place
Linas and Simona	"What's Happened to Your Love?"	4	1
Rūta Ščiogolevaitė	"Over"	3	2
Edmundas Kučinskas	"Hey, Hey Golden Ray"	1	3

== At Eurovision ==
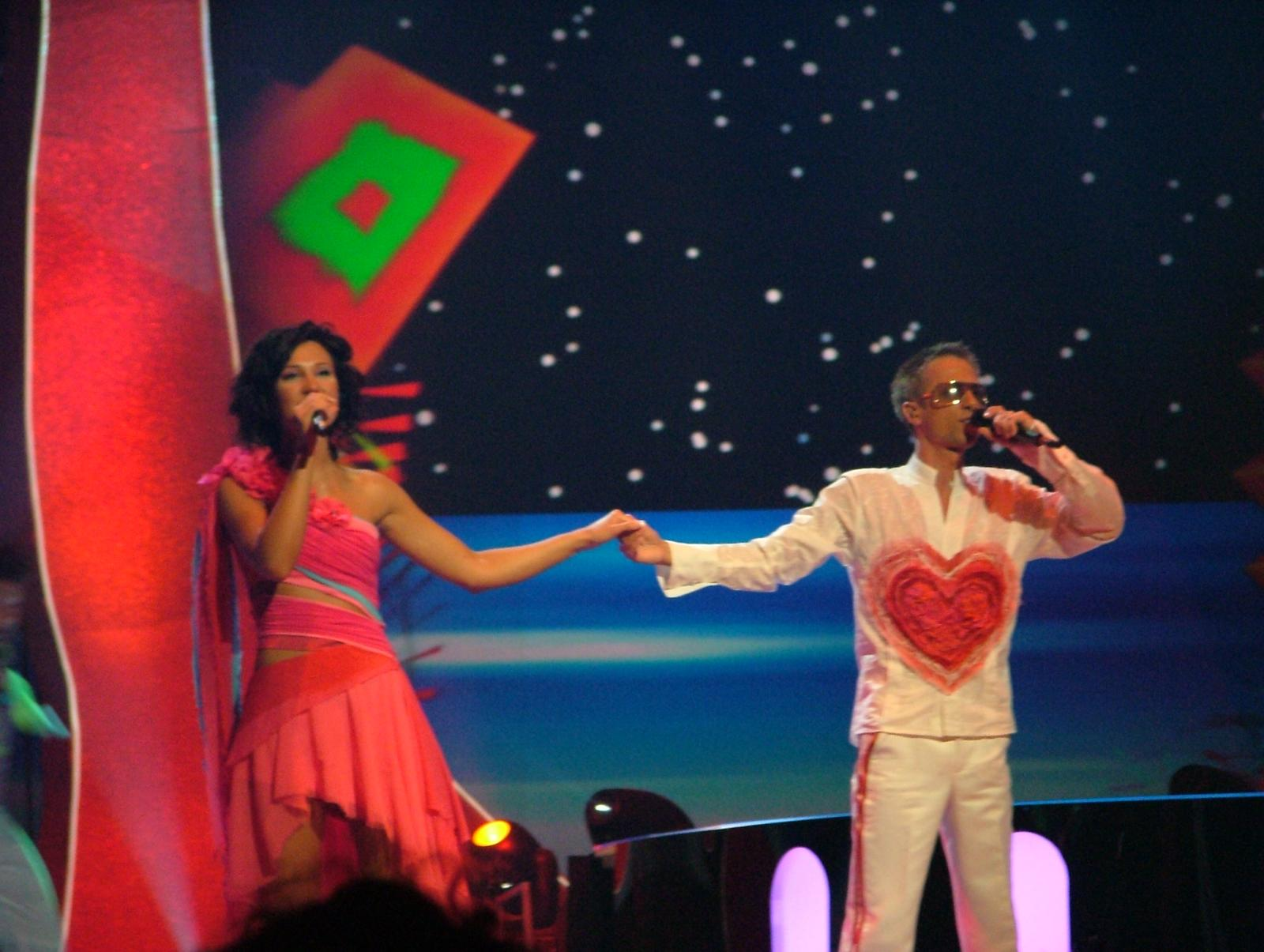
Linas and Simona during a rehearsal before the semi-final

It was announced that the competition's format would be expanded to include a semi-final in 2004. According to the rules, all nations with the exceptions of the host country, the "Big Four" (France, Germany, Spain and the United Kingdom), and the ten highest placed finishers in the 2003 contest are required to qualify from the semi-final on 12 May 2004 in order to compete in the final on 15 May 2004; the top ten countries from the semi-final progress to the final. On 23 March 2004, a special allocation draw was held which determined the running order for the semi-final and Lithuania was set to perform in position 12, following the entry from Ukraine and before the entry from Albania. At the end of the semi-final, Lithuania was not announced among the top 10 entries and therefore failed to qualify to compete in the final. It was later revealed that Lithuania placed sixteenth in the semi-final, receiving a total of 26 points.

The semi-final and final were broadcast in Lithuania on LTV with commentary by Darius Užkuraitis. LTV appointed Rolandas Vilkončius as its spokesperson to announce the Lithuanian votes during the final.

=== Voting ===
Below is a breakdown of points awarded to Lithuania and awarded by Lithuania in the semi-final and grand final of the contest. The nation awarded its 12 points to Ukraine in the semi-final and the final of the contest.

Following the release of the televoting figures by the EBU after the conclusion of the competition, it was revealed that a total of 31,472 televotes were cast in Lithuania during the two shows: 11,845 votes during the semi-final and 19,627 votes during the final.

==== Points awarded to Lithuania ====
Points awarded to Lithuania (Semi-final)
Score	Country
12 points	
10 points	
8 points	Latvia
7 points	Cyprus
6 points	
5 points	
4 points	
3 points	Ireland; Malta
2 points	Belarus; Greece
1 point	Israel

==== Points awarded by Lithuania ====
Points awarded by Lithuania (Semi-final)
Score	Country
12 points	Ukraine
10 points	Estonia
8 points	Greece
7 points	Malta
6 points	Latvia
5 points	Netherlands
4 points	Cyprus
3 points	Croatia
2 points	Belarus
1 point	Serbia and Montenegro

Points awarded by Lithuania (Final)
Score	Country
12 points	Ukraine
10 points	Greece
8 points	Russia
7 points	Poland
6 points	Sweden
5 points	Cyprus
4 points	Malta
3 points	Turkey
2 points	Serbia and Montenegro
1 point	Germany
