= Lithuania in the Eurovision Song Contest 2009 =

- Eurovision Song Contest 2009
- Participating broadcaster: Lietuvos radijas ir televizija (LRT)
- Country: Lithuania
- Selection process: Lietuvos Dainų Daina
- Selection date: 14 February 2009

Competing entry
- Song: "Love"
- Artist: Sasha Son
- Songwriters: Dmitrij Šavrov

Placement
- Semi-final result: Qualified (9th, 66 points)
- Final result: 23rd, 23 points

Participation chronology

Lithuania was represented at the Eurovision Song Contest 2009 with the song "Love", written and performed by Dmitrij Šavrov under his stage name Sasha Son. The Lithuanian participating broadcaster, Lietuvos radijas ir televizija (LRT), organised the song contest Lietuvos Dainų Daina (Lithuanian Song of Songs) in order to select its entry for the contest. The competition took place over six weeks and involved 36 competing entries. The results of each show were determined by regional televoting. In the final, fourteen entries remained and "Pasiklydęs žmogus" performed by Sasha Son was selected as the winner. The song was later translated from Lithuanian to English for the Eurovision Song Contest and was titled "Love".

Lithuania was drawn to compete in the second semi-final of the Eurovision Song Contest which took place on 14 May 2009. Performing during the show in position 14, "Love" was announced among the 10 qualifying entries of the second semi-final and therefore qualified to compete in the final on 16 May. It was later revealed that Lithuania placed ninth out of the 19 participating countries in the semi-final with 66 points. In the final, Lithuania performed in position 1 and placed twenty-third out of the 25 participating countries, scoring 23 points.

== Background ==
Prior to the 2009 contest, Lietuvos radijas ir televizija (LRT) had participated in the Eurovision Song Contest representing Lithuania nine times since its first entry in 1994. Its best placing in the contest was sixth, achieved in 2006 with the song "We Are the Winners" performed by LT United. Following the introduction of semi-finals in 2004, Lithuania, to this point, had managed to qualify to the final two times. In 2008, "Nomads in the Night" performed by Jeronimas Milius failed to qualify to the final.

As part of its duties as participating broadcaster, LRT organises the selection of its entry in the Eurovision Song Contest and broadcasts the event in the country. Other than the internal selection of their debut entry in 1994, the broadcaster has selected its entry consistently through a national final procedure. Despite financial problems and a possible boycott to be held between the three Baltic states due to the Russian participation in the 2008 South Ossetia war in Georgia as announced by Estonian Minister of Culture Laine Jänes, LRT confirmed its intentions to participate at the 2009 contest on 15 January 2009 and announced that the winner of the Lietuvos Dainų Daina song contest would represent Lithuania.

== Before Eurovision ==
=== Lietuvos Dainų Daina ===
The logo of Lietuvos Dainų Daina

Lietuvos Dainų Daina (Lithuanian Song of Songs) was a song contest developed by LRT that served as the national final to select its entry for the Eurovision Song Contest 2009. The competition involved a six-week-long process that commenced on 10 January 2009 and concluded with a winning song and artist on 14 February 2009. The six shows took place at the LRT studios in Vilnius and were hosted by Audrius Giržadas and Livija Gradauskienė. The shows were broadcast on LTV, LTV World, and Lietuvos Radijas, as well as online via the broadcaster's website lrt.lt.

==== Format ====
Lietuvos Dainų Daina involved 36 entries and consisted of six shows. The first three shows were the quarter-finals, consisting of twelve entries each. The top five entries advanced in the competition from each quarter-final, while LRT also selected two wildcard acts for the semi-finals out of the remaining non-qualifying acts from the quarter-finals. The fourth and fifth shows were the competition's semi-finals, where ten entries participated in each show and the top five proceeded to the final. In the final, the winner was selected from the remaining ten entries. The results of each of the ten shows were determined solely by public televoting through telephone and SMS voting. The votes of each of the ten counties of Lithuania were converted to points from 1-8, 10 and 12 and assigned based on the number of competing songs in the respective show. Monetary prizes were also awarded to the top three artists. The winner received 15,000 LTL, while the second place received 7,000 LTL, and the third place received 3,000 LTL.

==== Competing entries ====
On 31 October 2008, LRT opened two separate submission forms: one for artists and another for songwriters to submit their songs. Songs were required to be written by Lithuanian songwriters, while applications from established artists and songs in the Lithuanian language were preferred. The submission deadline for both applications concluded on 5 December 2008. On 17 December 2008, LRT announced the 36 artists selected for the competition. Among the artists was previous Eurovision contestant Linas Adomaitis, who represented Lithuania in 2004. The four-member jury panel that selected the competing entries consisted of Jonas Vilimas (Lietuvos Dainų Daina executive producer), Darius Užkuraitis (musicologist), Linas Rimša (composer) and Donatas Ulvydas (director). On 5 January 2009, the final changes to the list of 36 competing acts were made with the addition of Vita Rusaitytė to the list of performers and the withdrawal of singer Ruslanas Kirilkinas.

Artist	Song	Songwriter(s)
69 Danguje	"Meilės simfonija"	Stanislavas Stavickis
Alanas	"Geras jausmas"	Alanas Chošnau, Rūta Mėlynė
Asta Pilypaitė and Onsa	"Labas"	Tautrimas Rupulevičius
Augustė	"Not the Best Time"	Augustė Vedrickaitė
Aurelija Slavinskaitė	"Part of Me"	Artūras Bilaišis, Dan Donovan
Biplan	"Ar lauksi manęs?"	Maksas Melmanas
BIX	"Gyvenimo valsas"	Saulius Urbanovičius, Gintautas Gascevičius, Aurimas Povilaitis
Darius Pranckevičius and Violeta Valskytė	"Nelytėta viltis"	Darius Pranckevičius
Deivis	"Lietuva"	Dovydas Norvilas
Donatas Montvydas	"I Remember Last Time"	Donatas Montvydas
Egidijus Sipavičius	"Per mažai"	Stanislavas Stavickis, Aras Žvirblys, Neilas Sainius Babonas
Fuego	"Žvaigždžių milijonai"	Virginija Paulauskienė, Ažuolas Paulaskas, Arvydas Martinėnas
Indraya	"Svetima"	Indrė Zaleskytė, Marijus Basanovas, Alanas Chošnau
Jonas Čepulis and Skirmantė	"Uosilėli žaliasai"	Jonas Čepulis, Henrikas Rudauskas
Kamilė	"No Way to Run"	Kamilė Kielaitė, Marius Matulevičius
Kastaneda	"Aš tik šoumenas"	Lukas Pačkauskas, Donatas Baumila
Linas Adomaitis	"Tavo spalvos"	Linas Adomaitis, Tomas Ivanauskas
Milana	"Ar tu mane matei"	Milana Rozenkovič, Justinas Chachlauskas
Milanno and Karina Krysko	"Kelias pas tave"	Vaidotas Valiukevičius, Aras Vėberis, Arvydas Skirutis
Natalija and Deivydas Zvonkus	"Mes gyvenam gerai"	Deivydas Zvonkus
Rosita Čivilytė and Donatas Montvydas	"Dainų daina"	Rūta Lukoševičiūtė, Rosita Čivilytė, Donatas Montvydas
Rūta Lukoševičiūtė	"Trapus žmogus"	Rūta Lukoševičiūtė, Marius Matulevičius
Rūta Ščiogolevaitė	"Redemption"	Rytis Zemkauskas, Paulius Zdanavičius, Rūta Ščiogolevaitė
Sasha Son	"Pasiklydęs žmogus"	Dmitrij Šavrov, Viktorija Matulevicienė, Dina Grigonytė
Saulės kliošas	"Saulė"	Saulės kliošas
Siela	"Euforija"	Aurelijus Sirgedas
Širdelės	"Visko per mažai"	Žilvinas Liulys
ŠokoLedas	"Plastmasinė širdis"	Kristina Karalytė
Soliaris, Greta and Sel	"Noriu žinot"	Marijus Adomaitis, Mindaugas Lapinskis, Egidijus Dragūnas
Stano	"Viskas pasakyta"	Stanislavas Stavickis
Taja	"Vėjai keturi"	Erika Klimenko
Urtė Šilagalytė	"The Elegant Blues"	Dalius Pletniovas
Vilius Tarasovas	"Aš tik tavim tikiu"	Mindaugas Lapinskis
Violeta Tarasovienė	"Aš būsiu šalia"	Mindaugas Lapinskis
Vita Rusaitytė	"Dar pabūkim drauge"	Vita Rusaitytė
YVA	"Į dangų"	Deivydas Zvonkus

==== Heats ====
The three heats of the competition took place on 10, 17, and 24 January 2009 and featured twelve entries each. The top six entries advanced to the semi-finals from each heat, while the bottom six were eliminated. On 18 January 2009, LRT announced that "The Elegant Blues" performed by Urtė Šilagalytė had received a wildcard and also proceeded to the semi-finals. "Noriu žinot" performed by Soliaris, Greta and Sel was announced to have received the second wildcard to proceed to the semi-finals on 5 February 2009.

On 31 January 2009, two of the entries that advanced from the heats were disqualified due to plagiarism: "Lietuva" performed by Deivis plagiarised the song "There She Goes" by The La's, while "Trapus žmogus" performed by Rūta Lukoševičiūtė plagiarised the song "Written in the Skies" by Elton John. "Uosilėli žaliasai" performed by Jonas Čepulis and Skirmantė, and "Saulė" performed by Saulės kliošas replaced the disqualified entries and advanced to the semi-finals.

Key

Qualifier Wildcard qualifier Entry disqualified Replacement qualifier

Heat 1 – 10 January 2009
R/O	Artist	Song	Points	Place
1	Jonas Čepulis and Skirmantė	"Uosilėli žaliasai"	49	7
2	Alanas	"Geras jausmas"	35	9
3	Violeta Tarasovienė	"Aš būsiu šalia"	74	3
4	Milana	"Ar tu mane matei"	30	12
5	Vilius Tarasovas	"Aš tik tavim tikiu"	62	4
6	Augustė	"Not the Best Time"	41	8
7	Darius Pranckevičius and Violeta Valskytė	"Nelytėta viltis"	78	2
8	Kamilė	"No Way to Run"	33	10
9	Sasha Son	"Pasiklydęs žmogus"	92	1
10	Vita Rusaitytė	"Dar pabūkim drauge"	33	11
11	69 Danguje	"Meilės simfonija"	62	5
12	Egidijus Sipavičius	"Per mažai"	56	6

Detailed Regional Televoting Results
R/O	Song	Telšiai	Tauragė	Klaipėda	Šiauliai	Utena	Panevėžys	Alytus	Marijampolė	Kaunas	Vilnius	Total
1	"Uosilėli žaliasai"	6	5	4	5	6	6	3	4	3	7	49
2	"Geras jausmas"	3	4	2	4	7	5	5	2	1	3	35
3	"Aš būsiu šalia"	12	10	8	6	8	7	8	5	5	5	74
4	"Ar tu mane matei"	7	4	1	1	10	3				4	30
5	"Aš tik tavim tikiu"	8	8	5	5	12	6	2	12	4		62
6	"Not the Best Time"	10	7	7	2	6	4	1	1	2	1	41
7	"Nelytėta viltis"	3	12	10	7	5	12	10	3	6	10	78
8	"No Way to Run"	3	4	1	12	4	8	1				33
9	"Pasiklydęs žmogus"	5	6	12	10	5	10	12	10	10	12	92
10	"Dar pabūkim drauge"	6	5	3	4	4	4		2	3	2	33
11	"Meilės simfonija"	4	7	5	8	5	5	5	8	7	8	62
12	"Per mažai"	4	4	3	3	4	12	7	7	6	6	56

Heat 2 – 17 January 2009
R/O	Artist	Song	Points	Place
1	Biplan	"Ar lauksi manęs?"	44	9
2	Rūta Ščiogolevaitė	"Redemption"	81	3
3	Linas Adomaitis	"Tavo spalvos"	71	4
4	Soliaris, Greta and Sel	"Noriu žinot"	53	8
5	YVA	"Į dangų"	54	6
6	BIX	"Gyvenimo valsas"	56	5
7	Kastaneda	"Aš tik šoumenas"	35	12
8	~~Deivis~~	~~"Lietuva"~~	~~120~~	~~1~~
9	Urtė Šilagalytė	"The Elegant Blues"	54	7
10	Taja	"Vėjai keturi"	44	10
11	Siela	"Euforija"	38	11
12	Rosita Čivilytė and Donatas Montvydas	"Dainų daina"	95	2

Detailed Regional Televoting Results
R/O	Song	Telšiai	Tauragė	Klaipėda	Šiauliai	Utena	Panevėžys	Alytus	Marijampolė	Kaunas	Vilnius	Total
1	"Ar lauksi manęs?"	4	6	4	5	4	7	3	7	2	2	44
2	"Redemption"	7	8	8	10	8	8	7	12	7	6	81
3	"Tavo spalvos"	5	6	6	8	5	5	8	10	10	8	71
4	"Noriu žinot"	4	5	7	6	4	4	4	7	5	7	53
5	"Į dangų"	5	7	7	6	4	4	6	6	6	3	54
6	"Gyvenimo valsas"	8	5	5	12	5	5	2	6	4	4	56
7	"Aš tik šoumenas"	4	5	3	6	4	6		6		1	35
8	~~"Lietuva"~~	~~12~~	~~12~~	~~12~~	~~12~~	~~12~~	~~12~~	~~12~~	~~12~~	~~12~~	~~12~~	~~120~~
9	"The Elegant Blues"	6	8	5	7	4	5	5	6	3	5	54
10	"Vėjai keturi"	4	6	7	5	6	4	1	8	1	2	44
11	"Euforija"	4	5	3	5	10	3	1	6	1		38
12	"Dainų daina"	10	10	10	8	7	10	10	12	8	10	95

Heat 3 – 24 January 2009
R/O	Artist	Song	Points	Place
1	Saulės kliošas	"Saulė"	46	7
2	Donatas Montvydas	"I Remember Last Time"	106	1
3	Širdelės	"Visko per mažai"	43	8
4	Indraya	"Svetima"	20	12
5	Natalija and Deivydas Zvonkus	"Mes gyvenam gerai"	40	9
6	Milanno and Karina Krysko	"Kelias pas tave"	55	6
7	El Fuego	"Žvaigždžių milijonai"	90	2
8	Stano	"Viskas pasakyta"	35	10
9	Asta Pilypaitė and Onsa	"Labas"	75	4
10	Aurelija Slavinskaitė	"Part of Me"	59	5
11	ŠokoLedas	"Plastmasinė širdis"	29	11
12	~~Rūta Lukoševičiūtė~~	~~"Trapus žmogus"~~	~~77~~	~~3~~

Detailed Regional Televoting Results
R/O	Song	Telšiai	Tauragė	Klaipėda	Šiauliai	Utena	Panevėžys	Alytus	Marijampolė	Kaunas	Vilnius	Total
1	"Saulė"	5	8	5	4	6	3	3	4		8	46
2	"I Remember Last Time"	10	10	10	12	12	10	12	10	8	12	106
3	"Visko per mažai"	3	5	8	8	5	4	5	4	1		43
4	"Svetima"	1	3	2	3	2	5	1	3			20
5	"Mes gyvenam gerai"	2	3	4	1	4	2	5	12	4	3	40
6	"Kelias pas tave"	6	6	6	5	7	6	7	5	6	1	55
7	"Žvaigždžių milijonai"	12	12	7	4	10	8	10	7	10	10	90
8	"Viskas pasakyta"	4	4	3	6	3	3	4	2	2	4	35
9	"Labas"	8	7	12	7	7	7	8	8	5	6	75
10	"Part of Me"	7	6	3	5	7	4	7	6	12	2	59
11	"Plastmasinė širdis"	1	4	1	2	3	4	2	4	3	5	29
12	~~"Trapus žmogus"~~	~~6~~	~~8~~	~~5~~	~~10~~	~~8~~	~~12~~	~~6~~	~~8~~	~~7~~	~~7~~	~~77~~

==== Semi-finals ====
The two semi-finals of the competition took place on 31 January and 7 February 2009 and featured ten entries each. The top five entries advanced to the final from each semi-final, while the bottom five were eliminated.

Semi-final 1 – 31 January 2009
R/O	Artist	Song	Points	Place
1	Rosita Čivilytė and Donatas Montvydas	"Dainų daina"	53	7
2	Vilius Tarasovas	"Aš tik tavim tikiu"	20	10
3	Darius Pranckevičius and Violeta Valskytė	"Nelytėta viltis"	100	2
4	Egidijus Sipavičius	"Per mažai"	32	9
5	Linas Adomaitis	"Tavo spalvos"	82	3
6	Milanno and Karina Krysko	"Kelias pas tave"	58	5
7	Sasha Son	"Pasiklydęs žmogus"	109	1
8	Violeta Tarasovienė	"Aš būsiu šalia"	39	8
9	BIX	"Gyvenimo valsas"	57	6
10	Aurelija Slavinskaitė	"Part of Me"	59	4

Detailed Regional Televoting Results
R/O	Song	Telšiai	Tauragė	Klaipėda	Šiauliai	Utena	Panevėžys	Alytus	Marijampolė	Kaunas	Vilnius	Total
1	"Dainų daina"	6	6	3	6	8	6	4	5	4	5	53
2	"Aš tik tavim tikiu"	5	2	4	2	1	3	1	2	2	1	20
3	"Nelytėta viltis"	10	12	10	8	10	12	10	8	10	10	100
4	"Per mažai"	3	3	3	3	2	4	3	3	6	2	32
5	"Tavo spalvos"	7	7	8	10	6	8	8	12	8	8	82
6	"Kelias pas tave"	5	5	6	4	5	7	6	7	6	7	58
7	"Pasiklydęs žmogus"	12	10	12	12	12	10	12	10	7	12	109
8	"Aš būsiu šalia"	5	3	7	3	3	5	2	5	3	3	39
9	"Gyvenimo valsas"	8	4	2	7	7	7	5	6	5	6	57
10	"Part of Me"	4	8	5	5	4	6	7	4	12	4	59

Semi-final 2 – 7 February 2009
R/O	Artist	Song	Points	Place
1	Soliaris, Greta and Sel	"Noriu žinot"	30	9
2	YVA	"Į dangų"	16	10
3	Asta Pilypaitė and Onsa	"Labas"	40	8
4	Rūta Ščiogolevaitė	"Redemption"	88	3
5	Donatas Montvydas	"I Remember Last Time"	95	2
6	69 danguje	"Meilės simfonija"	110	1
7	Urtė Šilagalytė	"The Elegant Blues"	42	7
8	El Fuego	"Žvaigždžiu milijonai"	53	6
9	Jonas Čepulis and Skirmantė	"Uosilėli žaliasai"	68	5
10	Saulės kliošas	"Saulė"	75	4

Detailed Regional Televoting Results
R/O	Song	Telšiai	Tauragė	Klaipėda	Šiauliai	Utena	Panevėžys	Alytus	Marijampolė	Kaunas	Vilnius	Total
1	"Noriu žinot"	3	2	3	3	4	2	5	2	3	3	30
2	"Į dangų"	2	1	2	2	2	1	2	1	2	1	16
3	"Labas"	6	4	4	4	4	3	4	4	5	2	40
4	"Redemption"	7	7	10	10	6	8	10	10	10	10	88
5	"I Remember Last Time"	12	10	8	10	10	12	8	5	8	12	95
6	"Meilės simfonija"	8	12	12	12	12	10	12	12	12	8	110
7	"The Elegant Blues"	4	3	5	5	3	5	3	6	4	4	42
8	"Žvaigždžiu milijonai"	5	6	7	6	5	4	6	3	6	5	53
9	"Uosilėli žaliasai"	7	5	6	7	8	7	7	7	7	7	68
10	"Saulė"	10	8	8	8	7	6	7	8	7	6	75

==== Final ====
The final of the competition took place on 14 February 2009 and featured the remaining ten entries that qualified from the semi-finals. "Pasiklydęs žmogus" performed by Sasha Son was selected as the winner after gaining maximum points from all ten voting counties.

Final – 14 February 2009
R/O	Artist	Song	Points	Place
1	Saulės kliošas	"Saulė"	19	9
2	69 Danguje	"Meilės simfonija"	76	3
3	Rūta Ščiogolevaitė	"Redemption"	72	4
4	Donatas Montvydas	"I Remember Last Time"	100	2
5	Jonas Čepulis and Skirmantė	"Uosilėli žaliasai"	31	8
6	Darius Pranckevičius and Violeta Valskytė	"Nelytėta viltis"	39	7
7	Milanno and Karina Krysko	"Kelias pas tave"	48	6
8	Sasha Son	"Pasiklydęs žmogus"	120	1
9	Linas Adomaitis	"Tavo spalvos"	62	5
10	Aurelija Slavinskaitė	"Part of Me"	13	10

Detailed Regional Televoting Results
R/O	Song	Telšiai	Tauragė	Klaipėda	Šiauliai	Utena	Panevėžys	Alytus	Marijampolė	Kaunas	Vilnius	Total
1	"Saulė"	2	2	2	2	2	2	2	1	2	2	19
2	"Meilės simfonija"	8	8	8	8	7	7	7	8	8	7	76
3	"Redemption"	6	6	7	7	8	8	8	7	7	8	72
4	"I Remember Last Time"	10	10	10	10	10	10	10	10	10	10	100
5	"Uosilėli žaliasai"	3	3	3	3	3	3	3	2	3	5	31
6	"Nelytėta viltis"	4	4	5	4	4	4	4	3	4	3	39
7	"Kelias pas tave"	5	5	4	5	5	5	5	5	5	4	48
8	"Pasiklydęs žmogus"	12	12	12	12	12	12	12	12	12	12	120
9	"Tavo spalvos"	7	7	6	6	6	6	6	6	6	6	62
10	"Part of Me"	1	1	1	1	1	1	1	4	1	1	13

=== Controversy ===
Following the first heat of Lietuvos Dainų Daina, the regional televoting system was criticised by some of the non-qualifying artists. Alanas stated that he found the voting "very bizarre" and that he would like to know how many people voted for him, while Augustė called it "nonsense" due to the difference in the number of votes cast by different Lithuanian counties: "I don't understand how can we compare points of Vilnius and of some small city in Lithuania. In Vilnius, we need thousands of votes to get 12 points. Meanwhile in a small city, a hundred votes can be enough."

Jonas Vilimas, executive producer of the competition, stated: "Vilnius is not all of Lithuania. Every city has a right to express their opinion. This is a contest for all of Lithuania, it's even called Lithuanian song of songs. This way of voting is more objective. That's why we will keep on deciding the winner using this model."

=== Preparation ===
The Eurovision version of "Pasiklydęs žmogus", performed in English under the title "Love", was released on 15 March. The official music video was presented to the public on 20 March. On 13 April, LRT broadcast a support concert where Lithuanian viewers could call to donate funds to support the Lithuanian Eurovision participation. The concert featured guests Daiva Starinskaitė, Vaidas Baumila, Baiba Skurstene, Skamp, and Linas Adomaitis, and raised 73,700 LTL from the public donations.

=== Promotion ===
Sasha Son made several appearances across Europe to specifically promote "Love" as the Lithuanian Eurovision entry. Son performed "Love" during the final of the Latvian Eurovision national final Eirodziesma 2009 on 28 February, and during the final of the Ukrainian Eurovision national final on 8 March. On 18 April, Son performed during the Eurovision Promo Concert event which was held at the Amsterdam Marcanti venue in Amsterdam, Netherlands and hosted by Marga Bult and Maggie MacNeal. Son also took part in promotional activities in Ireland between 25 and 27 April, and in Malta on 28 and 29 April. In addition to his international appearances, a farewell concert was also held for Son on 2 May before he travelled to Moscow for the contest.

== At Eurovision ==
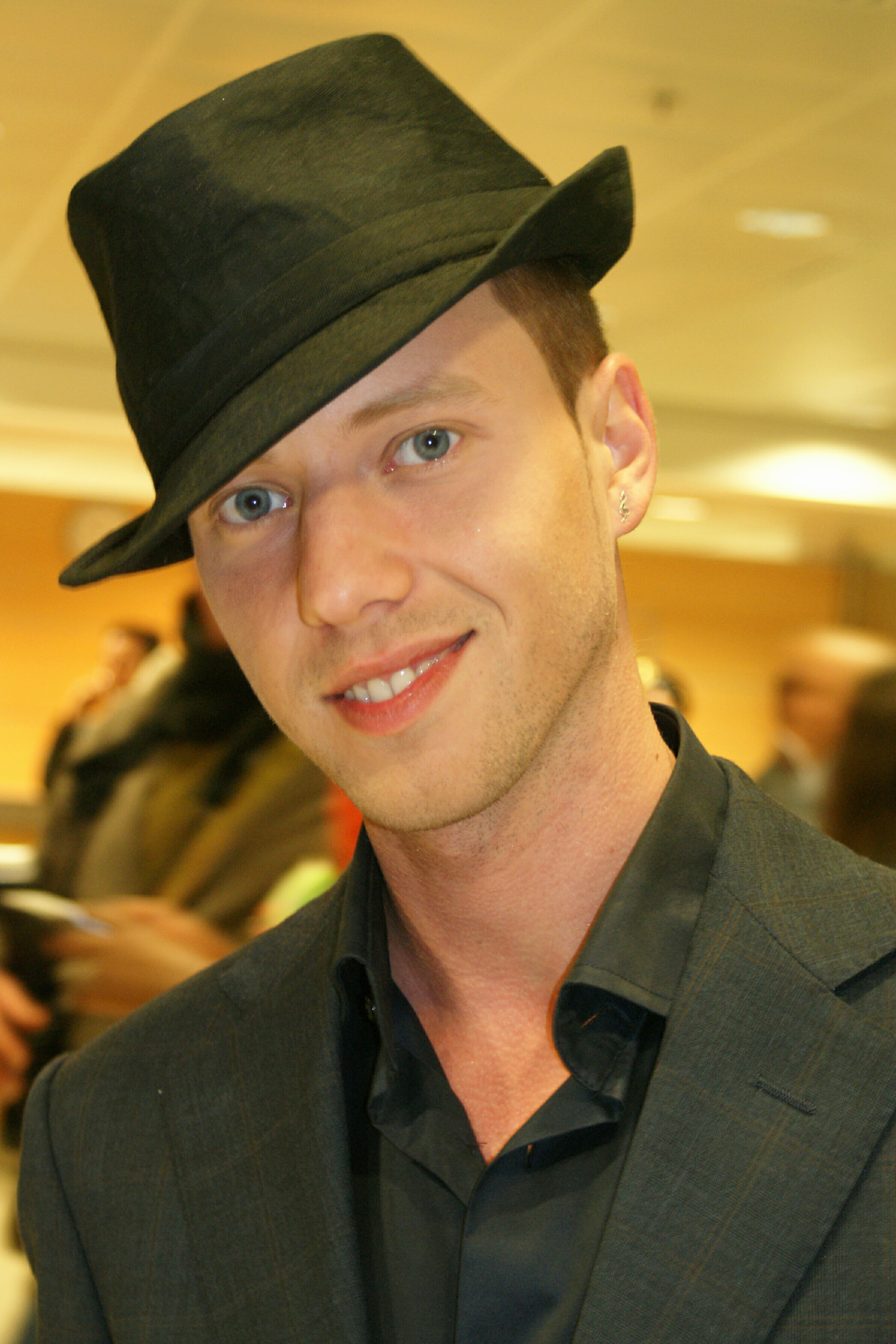
Sasha Son at the Eurovision Song Contest 2009

According to Eurovision rules, all nations with the exceptions of the host country and the "Big Four" (France, Germany, Spain and the United Kingdom) are required to qualify from one of two semi-finals in order to compete for the final; the top nine songs from each semi-final as determined by televoting progress to the final, and a tenth was determined by back-up juries. The European Broadcasting Union (EBU) split up the competing countries into six different pots based on voting patterns from previous contests, with countries with favourable voting histories put into the same pot. On 30 January 2009, a special allocation draw was held which placed each country into one of the two semi-finals. Lithuania was placed into the second semi-final, to be held on 14 May 2009. The running order for the semi-finals was decided through another draw on 16 March 2009 and Lithuania was set to perform in position 14, following the entry from Greece and before the entry from Moldova.

The two semi-finals and final were broadcast in Lithuania on LTV and LTV World with commentary by Darius Užkuraitis. The Lithuanian spokesperson, who announced the Lithuanian votes during the final, was Ignas Krupavičius.

=== Semi-final ===
Sasha Son took part in technical rehearsals on 6 and 10 May, followed by dress rehearsals on 13 and 14 May. The Lithuanian performance featured Sasha Son performing on stage with the LED screens displaying coloured blocks, piano keys, and the word "hope" at the end of the song. The performance began with Son sitting down at a piano before leaving midway. At the conclusion of the performance, Son held a lit flame in the palm of his hand to the camera. Sasha Son was joined by three backing vocalists: Baiba Skurstene, Nora Strolytė, and Sam Hywel James.

At the end of the show, Lithuania was announced as having finished in the top 10 and subsequently qualifying for the grand final. It was later revealed that Lithuania placed ninth in the semi-final, receiving a total of 66 points.

=== Final ===
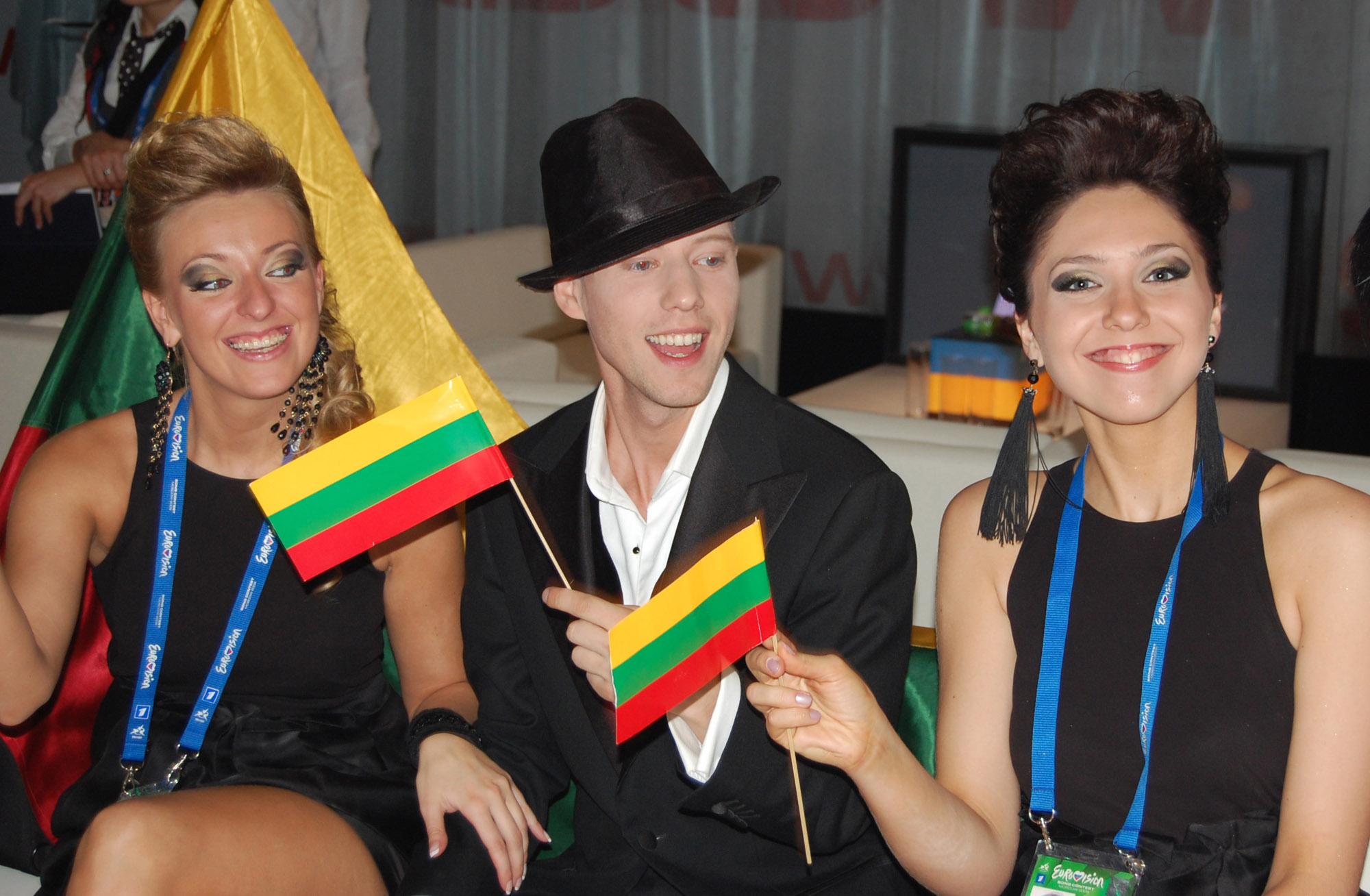
Sasha Son during the final

Shortly after the second semi-final, a winners' press conference was held for the ten qualifying countries. As part of this press conference, the qualifying artists took part in a draw to determine the running order for the final. This draw was done in the order the countries appeared in the semi-final running order. Lithuania was drawn to perform in position 1, before the entry from Israel.

Sasha Son once again took part in dress rehearsals on 15 and 16 May before the final, including the jury final where the professional juries cast their final votes before the live show. Sasha Son performed a repeat of his semi-final performance during the final on 16 May. At the conclusion of the voting, Lithuania finished in twenty-third place with 23 points.

=== Voting ===
The voting system for 2009 involved each country awarding points from 1-8, 10 and 12, with the points in the final being decided by a combination of 50% national jury and 50% televoting. Each nation's jury consisted of five music industry professionals who are citizens of the country they represent. This jury judged each entry based on: vocal capacity; the stage performance; the song's composition and originality; and the overall impression by the act. In addition, no member of a national jury was permitted to be related in any way to any of the competing acts in such a way that they cannot vote impartially and independently.

Following the release of the full split voting by the EBU after the conclusion of the competition, it was revealed that Lithuania had placed twentieth with both the public televote and the jury vote in the final. In the public vote, Lithuania scored 38 points, while with the jury vote, Lithuania scored 31 points.

Below is a breakdown of points awarded to Lithuania and awarded by Lithuania in the second semi-final and grand final of the contest, and the breakdown of the jury voting and televoting conducted during the two shows:

==== Points awarded to Lithuania ====
Points awarded to Lithuania (Semi-final 2)
Score	Country
12 points	Ireland
10 points	
8 points	
7 points	Estonia; Latvia; Norway
6 points	Azerbaijan
5 points	Denmark; Russia; Ukraine
4 points	Moldova; Poland
3 points	
2 points	France
1 point	Cyprus; Spain

Points awarded to Lithuania (Final)
Score	Country
12 points	
10 points	
8 points	
7 points	Ireland; Latvia
6 points	
5 points	
4 points	United Kingdom
3 points	
2 points	Estonia
1 point	Azerbaijan; Bulgaria; Denmark

==== Points awarded by Lithuania ====
Points awarded by Lithuania (Semi-final 2)
Score	Country
12 points	Norway
10 points	Azerbaijan
8 points	Estonia
7 points	Ireland
6 points	Latvia
5 points	Denmark
4 points	Greece
3 points	Poland
2 points	Ukraine
1 point	Cyprus

Points awarded by Lithuania (Final)
Score	Country
12 points	Norway
10 points	Estonia
8 points	Iceland
7 points	Russia
6 points	France
5 points	Azerbaijan
4 points	Ukraine
3 points	United Kingdom
2 points	Denmark
1 point	Malta

==== Detailed voting results ====
The following members comprised the Lithuanian jury:

- Linas Rimša – composer
- Linas Adomaitis – musician and songwriter, represented Lithuania in the 2004 contest
- Egmontas Bžeskas – producer
- Edita Vilčiauskienė – music editor
- Rūta Lukoševičiūtė – musician and songwriter

Detailed voting results from Lithuania (Final)
R/O	Country	Results			Points
R/O	Country	Jury	Televoting	Combined	Points
01	Lithuania				
02	Israel				
03	France	5	5	10	6
04	Sweden		1	1	
05	Croatia				
06	Portugal				
07	Iceland	8	6	14	8
08	Greece		3	3	
09	Armenia				
10	Russia	6	7	13	7
11	Azerbaijan		8	8	5
12	Bosnia and Herzegovina				
13	Moldova	1		1	
14	Malta	4		4	1
15	Estonia	10	10	20	10
16	Denmark	3	2	5	2
17	Germany				
18	Turkey				
19	Albania				
20	Norway	12	12	24	12
21	Ukraine	7		7	4
22	Romania				
23	United Kingdom	2	4	6	3
24	Finland				
25	Spain				
