= Lithuania in the Eurovision Song Contest 2005 =

- Eurovision Song Contest 2005
- Participating broadcaster: Lietuvos radijas ir televizija (LRT)
- Country: Lithuania
- Selection process: "Eurovizijos" dainų konkurso nacionalinė atranka
- Selection date: 26 February 2005

Competing entry
- Song: "Little by Little"
- Artist: Laura and the Lovers
- Songwriters: Bobby Ljunggren; William "Billy" Butt

Placement
- Semi-final result: Failed to qualify (25th)

Participation chronology

Lithuania was represented at the Eurovision Song Contest 2005 with the song "Little by Little", composed by Bobby Ljunggren, with lyrics by William "Billy" Butt, and performed by Laura and the Lovers. The Lithuanian participating broadcaster, Lietuvos radijas ir televizija (LRT), organised the national final "Eurovizijos" dainų konkurso nacionalinė atranka in order to select its entry for the contest. The national final took place over eight weeks and involved 49 competing entries. The results of each show were determined entirely by a public vote. In the final, twenty entries remained and "Little by Little" performed by Laura and the Lovers was selected as the winner with 5,465 votes.

Lithuania competed in the semi-final of the Eurovision Song Contest which took place on 19 May 2005. Performing during the show in position 2, "Little by Little" was not announced among the top 10 entries of the semi-final and therefore did not qualify to compete in the final. It was later revealed that Lithuania placed twenty-fifth (last) out of the 25 participating countries in the semi-final with 17 points.

== Background ==
Prior to the 2005 contest, Lietuvos radijas ir televizija (LRT) had participated in the Eurovision Song Contest representing Lithuania five times since its first entry in 1994. Its best placing in the contest was thirteenth, achieved in 2001 with the song "You Got Style" performed by Skamp. In 2004, "What's Happened to Your Love?" performed by Linas and Simona failed to qualify to the final.

As part of its duties as participating broadcaster, LRT organises the selection of its entry in the Eurovision Song Contest and broadcasts the event in the country. Other than the internal selection of its debut entry in 1994, the broadcaster has selected its entry consistently through a national final procedure. LRT confirmed its intentions to participate at the 2005 contest on 4 November 2004 and announced the organization of "Eurovizijos" dainų konkurso nacionalinė atranka, which would be the national final to select its entry.

== Before Eurovision ==
=== "Eurovizijos" dainų konkurso nacionalinė atranka ===
"Eurovizijos" dainų konkurso nacionalinė atranka (Eurovision Song Contest national selection) was the national final format developed by LRT in order to select its entry for the Eurovision Song Contest 2005. The competition involved an eight-week-long process that commenced on 8 January 2005 and concluded with a winning song and artist on 26 February 2005. The eight shows were hosted by Jurga Šeduikytė and Rolandas Vilkončius and were broadcast on LTV and LTV2 as well as online via the broadcaster's website lrt.lt.

==== Format ====
The 2005 competition involved 49 entries and consisted of eight shows. The first seven shows were the semi-finals held during the programme Lietuvos dainų dešimtukas. Six to eight entries participated in each semi-final, resulting in the top two or three from each show proceeding to the final. Three entries advanced if the semi-final had more than six entries, while two entries advanced if the semi-final had six or less entries. LRT also selected a wildcard act for the final out of the remaining non-qualifying acts from the semi-finals. In the final, the winner was selected from the remaining twenty entries. The results of each of the eight shows were determined solely by public televoting through telephone and SMS voting.

==== Competing entries ====
LRT opened a submission period on 4 November 2004 for artists and songwriters to submit their entries with the deadline on 10 December 2004. On 13 January 2005, LRT announced the 54 entries selected for the competition from 60 submissions received. The final changes to the list of 54 competing acts were later made with the withdrawal of the songs "Who You Are" performed by Diana, "Veins" performed by No Hero, "When the Night Comes" performed by Smoggaz, and "Gloria" performed by Ubalda, as well as the disqualification of "You" performed by Justė Kriauzaitė due to the song being a remake of "Ben" by Michael Jackson.

Artist	Song	Songwriter(s)
4Fun	"Your Vision"	Julija Ritčik, Justas Jasenka
Agnette	"Erškėtrožės"	Aurelijus Sirgedas
Agnieszka	"I'm Finally Free"	Agnieszka Dobrovolska, Gytis Balčiūnas
Aistė Pilvelytė	"I'll Let You Fly"	Michalis Antoniou, Linas Adomaitis, Hokšila Andradė, Aistė Pilvelytė
Alanas Chošnau	"Light Up The World"	Alanas Chošnau, Rūta Mėlynė
Andre	"Grande"	Andrea Zappa, Alex
Artas	"All I Know"	Artūras Pitkauskas, A. Giedraičius, Raigardus Tautkus
Atika	"Apie potvynius"	Darius Žvirblis
Audronė Augaitytė	"Dvasia"	Audronė Augaitytė, Andrius Paulavičius
Audronė Girkontaitė	"Šok, berniuk"	Audronė Girkontaitė
B'Avarija	"Oceans of Love"	Deivydas Zvonkus
Bracelet and Austeja	"Simple Girl"	Žilvinas Žusinas
Bugs Band	"Be With Me"	Edmunds Auglis, Rasa Kasperavičiūtė
Caramel Members	"Sleep Well"	Jurgis Baltrušaitis, Mantvydas Levickis, Žilvinas Lileikis, Julius Valančiauskus
Dvyniai	"Tikiu tavim"	Ferdinandas Raudoniaus
El Mar	"La reina of the World"	Raimonda Jagminaitė, Mindaugas Baranauskas
Ergo Fine	"Buona siera"	Aivaras Stepukonis, Povilas Meškėla
Eva and Česlovas Gabalis	"I'll Be There"	Georgios Kalpakidis, Marius Matulevičiaus
Fate	"Can Play That Game"	Fate
Gravel	"Girlfriend"	Tomaš Sinickis
Helada	"Find Me"	Olegas Zotovas, S. Varnauskas
Indraya	"Love Is in the Air"	Indrė Zaleskytė
Jūnė	"Kelionė"	Jūnė, O. Čepauskaitė
Kes	"Sly Hades"	Mantas Kiselaitis, Kęstutis Navickas
Lana Švilpe	"The Love Is Over"	Lana Švilpe, Birutė Petrikytė, O. Ševčenka
Land and Hey!	"Existence"	Rod K.
Laura and the Lovers	"Little by Little"	Bobby Ljunggren, William "Billy" Butt
Lawry	"Be My Lover"	Linas Adomaitis, Camden-MS
MG International	"Amazing Sun"	Mindaugas Piliponis, Olegas Zotovas, Elena Lumbienė
Nasa	"Meilė tau"	Saulius Pukinskas
N.E.O.	"You Are in Hollywood"	U. Westrum, Raigardas Tautkus, Raimondas Jankauskas
Pusbroliai Aliukai and Sesutė	"My Pretty"	Ologas Zotovas, Evaldas Melnikas
Rasa Kaušiūtė	"Back in the Game"	Carlos Coelho, J. Azevedo, N. Costa
Reda Striškaitė	"Now You Know"	Reda Striškaitė, Aurelijus Ščiuka
Robertas Kupstas	"You're the One"	Gina Jacobi, Micke Wennborn
Saulės kliošas	"Discoholic"	Rytis Tankevičius, Alvydas Mačiulskas, Aleksandras Raičenoks, Daiva Starinskaitė, Laurynas Šarkinas
Sea Stars	"Let the Music Play"	Silvija Pankūnaitė, Angelė Joknytė
Soft Rain	"Laiko upė"	Marius Matulevičiaus, S. Virginavičiūtė
Sugarfree	"Raining On"	E. Ožemedžionaitė, Romanas Lykovas
Taja	"You're in My Heart"	Rūta Lukoševičiūtė, Erika Klimenko
Tele Bim-Bam Neringa and Draugai	"Pupa, pupa"	Neringa Čereškevičienė, Alfredo Čereškevičiaus
The Road Band	"One-Man-Band"	Alexander Belkin, Dmitri Ritus-Ritčik
Viktoras Vaupšas	"You"	Viktoras Vaupšas
Vilija Matačiūnaitė	"Oh My God"	Vilija Matačiūnaitė
Vilma Voroblevaitė	"Teka upės"	Vilma Voroblevaitė
Violeta Riaubiškytė	"With You"	Violeta Riaubiškytė, Laimonas Vaišvila
Voodoo	"Space Between Us"	Laimonas Jurgaitis
Yva	"Barbie"	Deivydas Zvonkus
Žydrė	"My Heart's Praying"	Aivaras Stepukonis, Povilas Meškėla

==== Semi-finals ====
The seven semi-finals of the competition took place at the LRT studios in Vilnius between 8 January and 19 February 2005 and featured the 49 competing entries. In each of the first to fourth and sixth semi-finals, the top three advanced to the final, while the top two entries of the fifth and seventh semi-finals advanced to the final. On 22 February 2005, LRT announced that "Now You Know" performed by Reda Striškaitė had received the wildcard and also proceeded to the final.

Key

Qualifier Wildcard qualifier

Semi-final 1 – 8 January 2005
R/O	Artist	Song	Televote	Place
1	Bugs Band	"Be With Me"	198	3
2	Nasa	"Meilė tau"	70	7
3	Atika	"Apie potvynius"	128	5
4	Soft Rain	"Laiko upė"	66	8
5	Aistė Pilvelytė	"I'll Let You Fly"	544	1
6	Dvyniai	"Tikiu tavim"	139	4
7	Kes	"Sly Hades"	71	6
8	The Road Band	"One-Man-Band"	274	2

Semi-final 2 – 15 January 2005
R/O	Artist	Song	Televote	Place
1	Taja	"You're in My Heart"	220	6
2	Gravel	"Girlfriend"	243	5
3	Agnette	"Erškėtrožės"	74	8
4	El Mar	"La reina of the World"	565	2
5	Agnieszka	"I'm Finally Free"	186	7
6	Caramel Members	"Sleep Well"	268	4
7	Sea Stars	"Let the Music Play"	289	3
8	Laura and the Lovers	"Little by Little"	1,743	1

Semi-final 3 – 22 January 2005
R/O	Artist	Song	Televote	Place
1	Sugarfree	"Raining On"	265	4
2	Indraya	"Love Is in the Air"	81	7
3	Fate	"Can Play That Game"	139	5
4	Eva and Česlovas Gabalis	"I'll Be There"	831	2
5	Saulės Kliošas	"Discoholic"	1,074	1
6	Bracelet and Austeja	"Simple Girl"	157	6
7	Robertas Kupstas	"You're the One"	573	3

Semi-final 4 – 29 January 2005
R/O	Artist	Song	Televote	Place
1	Viktoras Vaupšas	"You"	181	5
2	MG International	"Amazing Sun"	137	6
3	Artas	"All I Know"	1,377	1
4	Audronė Girkontaitė	"Šok, berniuk"	67	7
5	Pusbroliai Aliukai and Sesutė	"My Pretty"	272	3
6	Andre	"Grande"	218	4
7	Violeta Riaubiškytė	"With You"	864	2

Semi-final 5 – 5 February 2005
R/O	Artist	Song	Televote	Place
1	Alanas Chošnau	"Light Up The World"	1,166	2
2	Helada	"Find Me"	439	6
3	4Fun	"Your Vision"	663	5
4	Vilma Voroblevaitė	"Teka upės"	971	3
5	Vilija Matačiūnaitė	"Oh My God"	1,585	1
6	Yva	"Barbie"	769	4

Semi-final 6 – 12 February 2005
R/O	Artist	Song	Televote	Place
1	Voodoo	"Space Between Us"	505	5
2	June	"Kelionė"	116	7
3	Tele Bim-Bam Neringa and Draugai	"Pupa, pupa"	1,631	1
4	Audronė Augaitytė	"Dvasia"	155	6
5	Rasa Kaušiūtė	"Back in the Game"	1,112	2
6	Žydrė	"My Heart's Praying"	984	4
7	B'Avarija	"Oceans of Love"	1,088	3

Semi-final 7 – 19 February 2005
R/O	Artist	Song	Televote	Place
1	Ergo Fine	"Buona siera"	3,547	1
2	Lana Švilpe	"The Love Is Over"	605	4
3	Land and Hey!	"Existence"	219	6
4	N.E.O.	"You Are in Hollywood"	2,175	2
5	Reda Striškaitė	"Now You Know"	508	5
6	Lawry	"Be My Lover"	1,467	3

==== Final ====
The final of the competition took place on 26 February 2005 at the Kaunas Sports Hall in Kaunas and featured the remaining twenty entries that qualified from the semi-final. "Little by Little" performed by Laura and the Lovers was selected as the winner after gaining the most votes from the public. In addition to the performances of the competing entries, Skamp (who represented Lithuania in 2001) and Marie N (who won Eurovision for Latvia in 2002) performed as the interval acts.

Final – 26 February 2005
R/O	Artist	Song	Televote	Place
1	Aistė Pilvelytė	"I'll Let You Fly"	651	9
2	Eva and Česlovas Gabalis	"I'll Be There"	713	8
3	Reda Striškaitė	"Now You Know"	155	16
4	The Road Band	"One-Man-Band"	51	18
5	B'Avarija	"Oceans of Love"	507	10
6	N.E.O.	"You Are in Hollywood"	464	11
7	Robertas Kupstas	"You're the One"	269	14
8	El Mar	"La reina of the World"	40	20
9	Vilija Matačiūnaitė	"Oh My God"	733	7
10	Artas	"All I Know"	872	6
11	Saulės kliošas	"Discoholic"	1,060	5
12	Rasa Kaušiūtė	"Back in the Game"	286	13
13	Sea Stars	"Let the Music Play"	42	19
14	Bugs Band	"Be With Me"	78	17
15	Violeta Riaubiškytė	"With You"	456	12
16	Laura and the Lovers	"Little by Little"	5,465	1
17	Ergo Fine	"Buona siera"	1,533	3
18	Tele Bim-Bam Neringa and Draugai	"Pupa, pupa"	1,462	4
19	Pusbroliai Aliukai and Sesutė	"My Pretty"	268	15
20	Alanas Chošnau	"Light Up the World"	5,292	2

== At Eurovision ==
According to Eurovision rules, all nations with the exceptions of the host country, the "Big Four" (France, Germany, Spain and the United Kingdom), and the ten highest placed finishers in the 2004 contest are required to qualify from the semi-final on 19 May 2005 in order to compete for the final on 21 May 2005; the top ten countries from the semi-final progress to the final. On 22 March 2005, a special allocation draw was held which determined the running order for the semi-final and Lithuania was set to perform in position 2, following the entry from Austria and before the entry from Portugal. At the end of the semi-final, Lithuania was not announced among the top 10 entries and therefore failed to qualify to compete in the final. It was later revealed that Lithuania placed twenty-fifth (last) in the semi-final, receiving a total of 17 points.

The semi-final and final were broadcast in Lithuania on LTV with commentary by Darius Užkuraitis. LTV appointed Rolandas Vilkončius as its spokesperson to announce the Lithuanian votes during the final.

=== Voting ===
Below is a breakdown of points awarded to Lithuania and awarded by Lithuania in the semi-final and grand final of the contest. The nation awarded its 12 points to Latvia in the semi-final and the final of the contest.

==== Points awarded to Lithuania ====
Points awarded to Lithuania (Semi-final)
Score	Country
12 points	
10 points	
8 points	Latvia
7 points	
6 points	
5 points	Ireland
4 points	United Kingdom
3 points	
2 points	
1 point	

==== Points awarded by Lithuania ====
Points awarded by Lithuania (Semi-final)
Score	Country
12 points	Latvia
10 points	Moldova
8 points	Switzerland
7 points	Denmark
6 points	Norway
5 points	Estonia
4 points	Croatia
3 points	Belarus
2 points	Israel
1 point	Poland

Points awarded by Lithuania (Final)
Score	Country
12 points	Latvia
10 points	Moldova
8 points	Switzerland
7 points	Russia
6 points	Croatia
5 points	Norway
4 points	Denmark
3 points	Israel
2 points	Malta
1 point	Greece
