= Bimbam =

Bimbam may refer to:

- Chandra Bimbam, a 1980 Indian Malayalam film
- Paulinka Bimbam, a character from Charlotte Salomon (opera)
- R&B band "Bimbam" formed by Tony Bellamy and Butch Rillera

== See also ==
- Bim Bam
- Bim-Bam
- Bim and Bam
