= Martinkėnas =

- Lithuanian surname
- m.: Martinkėnas
- f.: (unmarried): Martinkėnaitė
- f.: (married): Martinkėnienė

Martinkėnas is a Lithuanian-language surname.

- Valdemaras Martinkėnas, Lithuanian footballer
- Ingrida Martinkėnaitė, Lithuanian singer from the vocal pop music girl group 69 Danguje
