= Krysko =

Krysko is a surname. Notable people with the surname include:

- Karina Krysko (born 1981), Lithuanian singer
- Kenney Krysko (fl. 2007), American herpetologist
- Maksim Krysko (born 1994), Belarusian sprint canoeist
