= Alvidas Tautkus =

Lithuanian music producer, composer and singer (born 1953)

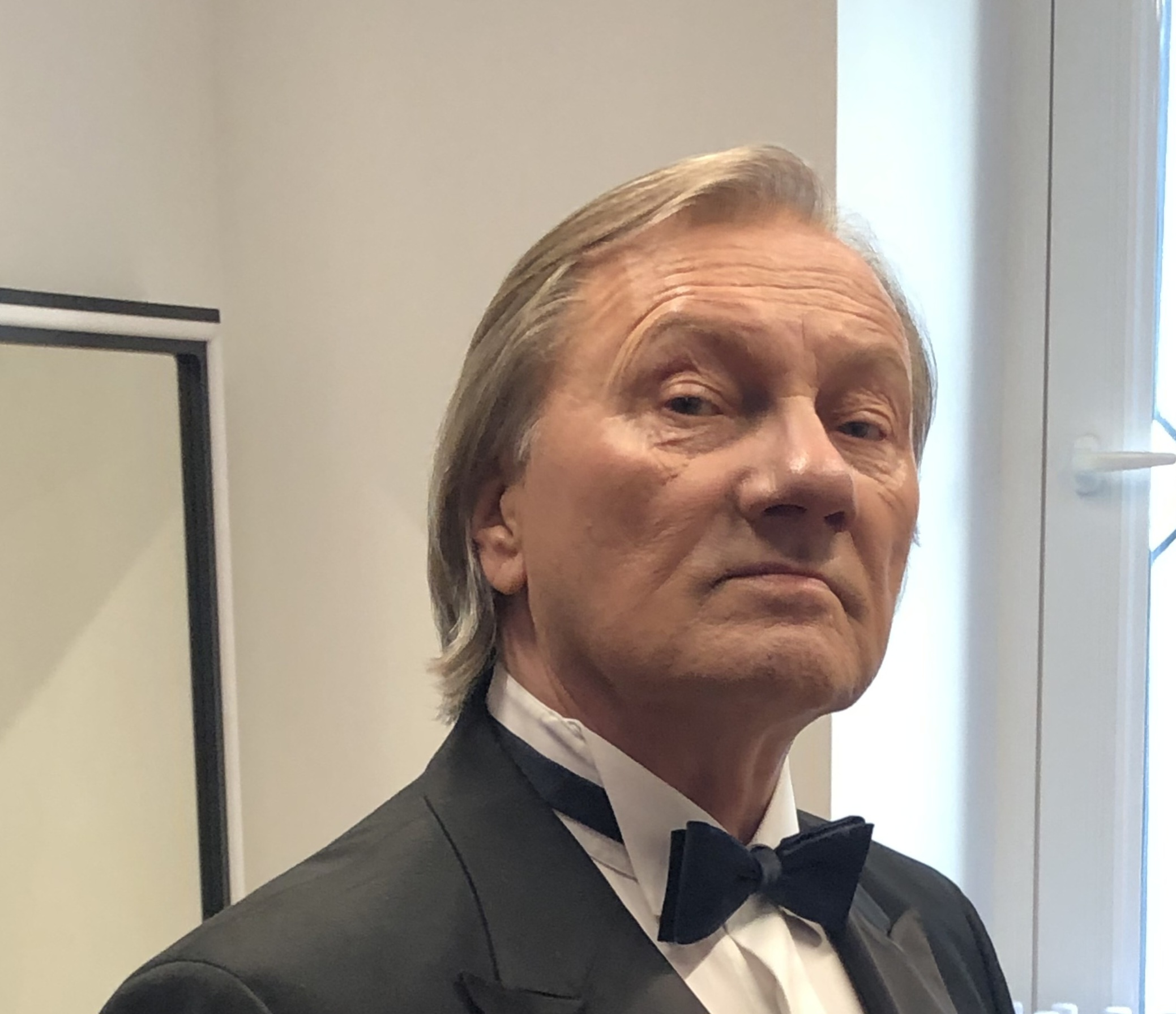
- Alvidas Tautkus in 2026

Background information
- Born: 24 December 1953; Šiluva, Lithuania
- Origin: Lithuania
- Genres: Rock; country rock; soft rock
- Occupations: Music producer; Singer
- Years active: 1976–present
- Labels: Pop Centras; ATM

Alvidas Tautkus (born 24 December 1953) is a Lithuanian music producer, composer and singer who founded the soft rock music group Rondo.

== Career ==
=== Early years ===
A high school student in Šiluva, Alvidas, the leader and vocalist founded a school band. Young Eimuntas Nekrošius played bass guitar. Eimuntas' father, a handyman carpenter, carved the bass guitar out of wood.

Alvidas graduated from the high school and moved to capital Vilnius to pursue studies at Vilnius University.

== "Rondo" ==
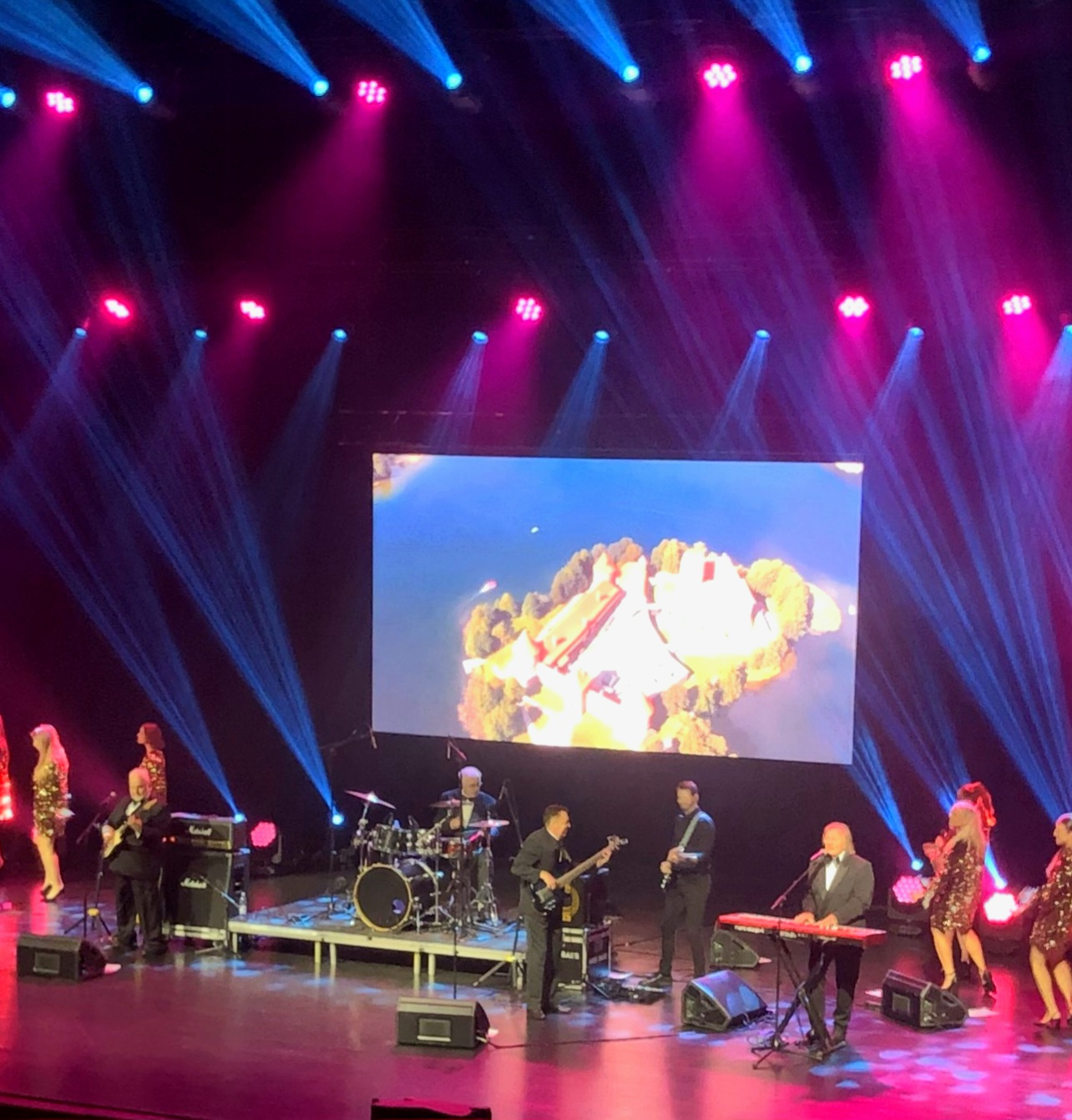
Alvidas Tautkus (keyboards); group Rondo in concert in Palanga, 2026

Tautkus graduated in German studies from Vilnius University and moved to Raseiniai in Western Lithuania to teach German language at a community college. Alvidas Tautkus founded the soft rock group Rondo in 1976; his brother Gintautas was a guitarist.

"During the dreary days of Soviet era the rock group attracted crowds of visitors from small towns to cities to large concert halls", Laima Zemuliene of Stilius wrote in 2021

Rondo remains "one of the leading bands in Lithuania", Musikmarkt wrote in 1993.

The band held a 50th anniversary tour in 2026.

=== Naming the band "Rondo" ===
Musicologist Liudas Saltenis suggested to officially name the group Rondo. Per rules of Soviet culture, the musical group names could not be chosen at will. The name Rondo' had to be approved by the then-Soviet Ministry of Culture.

=== Founding band members (1976) ===
- Alvidas Tautkus – vocal, keyboards, song writer
- Gintautas Tautkus – vocal, guitar, song writer
- Arunas Armonas – vocal, guitar, saxophone, song writer
- Antanas Morkevicius – vocals, bass guitar
- Romas Uzusienis – drums, percussion

=== Notable "Rondo" songs ===
- Geguzi
- Prisiglausk
- Vakare
- Musu zalias Kaune
- Laukų gėle
- Pelenė
- Lietuva
- Margarita
- Egle, mano sese
- Tevyne (Trecias Atsidusimas)

== "Pop Centras" ==
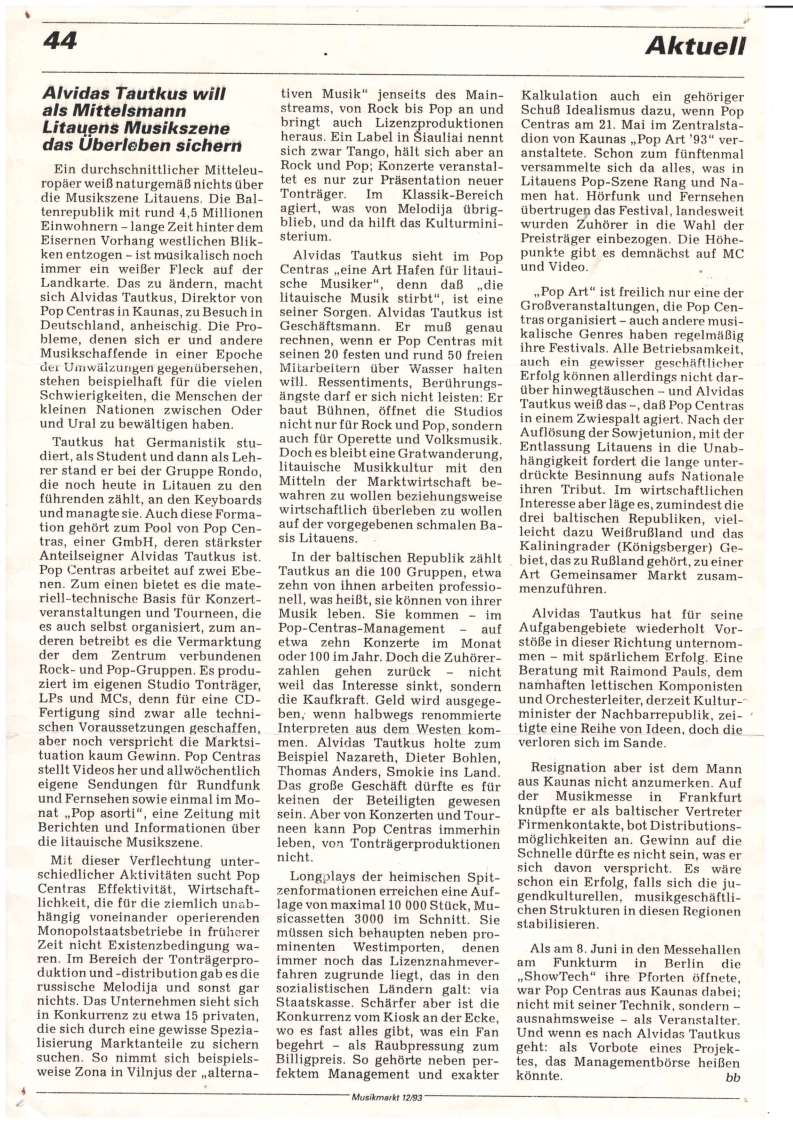
Print article about Alvidas Tautkus in German "MusikMarkt" publication, 1993 vol 22, page 44

After the restoration of Lithuanian independence in 1990 along with the country's democratic and economic liberties Tautkus founded a music production company Pop Centras.

"Alvidas Tautkus wants to secure the survival of Lithuania's music scene as a dealmaker", German Musikmarkt wrote in 1993.

With the Iron curtain just behind, the "Pop Centras" by Alvidas produced the first shows of Dieter Bohlen and Thomas Anders of Modern Talking, Smokie, Nazareth, Boney M., Chris Norman, Slade, Samantha Fox and Kim Wilde in Lithuania.

=== Groups produced by Alvidas Tautkus and Pop Centras ===
Tautkus' Pop Centras co-launched and produced several musical groups.

- N.E.O..
- Mink Taka
- Aitra
- Kvint‘M
- Stiprus Smūgis
- 16 Hz
- Pilnatis
- Amplua

== "ATM Kompanija" productions ==
Alvidas Tautkus launched creative music production company ATM Kompanija in 2008. "ATM Kompanija" produced concerts Baltischer Wind at the Berliner Philharmonie in 2018 to commemorate anniversary of contemporary Lithuanian state. The concert featured Kaunas State Philharmonic and vocalist Merunas Vitulskis.

== Awards and honors ==
2022: "Lifetime commitment and devotion to Lithuanian show business and popular culture", AGATA
