= Lithuania in the Eurovision Song Contest 2002 =

- Eurovision Song Contest 2002
- Participating broadcaster: Lithuanian National Radio and Television (LRT)
- Country: Lithuania
- Selection process: Internal selection among "Eurovizijos" dainų konkurso nacionalinė atranka entries
- Announcement date: 27 March 2002

Competing entry
- Song: "Happy You"
- Artist: Aivaras
- Songwriter: Aivaras Stepukonis

Placement
- Final result: 23rd, 12 points

Participation chronology

Lithuania was represented at the Eurovision Song Contest 2002 with the song "Happy You", written and performed by Aivaras. The Lithuanian participating broadcaster, Lithuanian National Radio and Television (LRT), organised the national final "Eurovizijos" dainų konkurso nacionalinė atranka in order to select its entry for the contest. The national final involved 15 competing entries and "We All" performed by B'Avarija was selected as the winner following the combination of votes from a jury panel, votes from the venue audience, and a public vote. However, the entry was later disqualified due to a Lithuanian version of the song being released on CD at the end of 2001, and replaced by runner-up "Happy You", performed by Aivaras.

Lithuania competed in the Eurovision Song Contest which took place on 25 May 2002. Performing as the closing entry during the show in position 24, Lithuania placed twenty-third out of the 24 participating countries, scoring 12 points.

== Background ==
Prior to the 2002 contest, Lithuanian National Radio and Television (LRT) had participated in the Eurovision Song Contest representing Lithuania three times since its first entry in 1994. Its best placing in the contest was thirteenth, achieved in 2001 with the song "You Got Style" performed by Skamp.

As part of its duties as participating broadcaster, LRT organises the selection of its entry in the Eurovision Song Contest and broadcasts the event in the country. The broadcaster had selected its debut entry in 1994 through an internal selection, while it held a national final procedure to select its entries since then. LRT confirmed its intentions to participate at the 2002 contest on 24 October 2001, and announced the organization of "Eurovizijos" dainų konkurso nacionalinė atranka, which would be the national final to select its entry.

== Before Eurovision ==
=== "Eurovizijos" dainų konkurso nacionalinė atranka ===
"Eurovizijos" dainų konkurso nacionalinė atranka (Eurovision Song Contest national selection) was the national final format developed by LRT in order to select its entry for the Eurovision Song Contest 2002. The competition took place on 14 February 2002 at the Palace of Sports and Culture in Vilnius, hosted by Gabija Vitkevičiūtė and Neringa Skrudupaitė, and was broadcast on LTV and LTV2.

==== Competing entries ====
LRT opened a submission period on 24 October 2001 for artists and songwriters to submit their entries with the deadline on 31 December 2001. On 8 January 2002, LRT announced the 15 entries selected for the competition from 45 submissions received. The 13-member jury panel that selected the competing entries consisted of Jonas Vilimas (LRT music producer), Nerijus Maliukevičius (Head of LRT's foreign department), Gytis Daugėla (President of the Music Culture Support Fund), Darius Užkuraitis (Lietuvos radijas music producer), Andrius Kairaitis (Lietuvos radijas music editor), Daiva Rinkevičiūtė (TV Antena journalist), Simona Jansonaitė (Respublika journalist), Asta Gujytė (M-1 program director), Gintaras Zdebskis (Lietus general director), Donatas Bučelis (Radiocentras program director), Algirdas Klova (composer), Gediminas Zujus (composer), and Eugenijus Butvydas (President of the Association of Lithuanian Concert Managers). On 30 January 2002, the final changes to the list of 15 competing acts were made with the disqualification of the song "Grace" performed by Aistė Pilvelytė, due to it being a modification of the song "Love by Grace" by Dave Loggins and Wayne Tester. The entry was replaced with the song "Don't Ever Stop" performed by Kosmo.

Artist	Song	Songwriter(s)
Adoms	"Q-Ba-Ba"	Linas Adomaitis
Agnė	"Feelings"	Artūras Gaidelias
Aivaras	"Happy You"	Aivaras Stepukonis
B'Avarija	"We All"	Deivydas Zvonkus, Juozas Liesis
IF	"If You Can"	Vytautas Miškinis, IF
Iris	"Find Your Song"	Kersti Kuus, Imre Sooäär
Jolanta Tubinytė and King Lion	"I Wanna Hold You"	Host & Snor, King Lion
La Vita	"Never"	Vytautas Lebednykas, Andrius Katkus, Domas Bajorūnas, Mantas Jankavičius
Kosmo	"Don't Ever Stop"	Vaidotas Valiukevičius, Vilius Lukauskas
Markas	"You're the Biggest Star of My Life"	Mariaus Salynas
Naktinės Personos	"I'm So in Love"	Audrius Balsevičius, Alanas Chošnau
Ramūnas Difartas and Dreams	"You'll Be Waiting"	Ramūnas Difartas, Aras Žvirblys
Rūta Lukoševičiūtė	"Hello"	Dalius Pletniovas, Rūta Lukoševičiūtė
Saulės kliošas	"Singing in the Night"	Saulės kliošas, Jonas Jurkūnas
Simona	"Fantasy"	Salim Lundquist

==== Final ====
The final of the competition took place on 14 February 2002 and featured the 15 competing entries. "We All" performed by B'Avarija was selected as the winner following the combination of votes from a jury panel (50%), the audience in the venue (25%), and public televoting (25%). The members of the jury consisted of Nijolė Ruzgienė (Head of Advertising and Information at the Vilnius Palace of Sports and Culture), Donatas Bučelis (Radiocentras program director), Linas Rimša (composer and producer), Daiva Rinkevičiūtė (Lietuvos rytas journalist), Žilvinas Žvagulis (singer), Neringa Čereškevičienė (composer), Gintaras Sodeika (Chairman of the Lithuanian Composers' Union), Jonas Vilimas (LRT music producer), Giedrius Puskunigis (composer), Gintaras Zdebskis (Lietus program director), and Darius Užkuraitis (Lietuvos radijas music producer).

Winner

Final – 14 February 2002
R/O	Artist	Song	Jury	Public		Total	Place
R/O	Artist	Song	Jury	Audience	Televote	Total	Place
1	Simona	"Fantasy"	—	—	—	—	15
2	Markas	"You're the Biggest Star of My Life"	—	—	—	—	14
3	Kosmo	"Don't Ever Stop"	—	—	—	—	13
4	Iris	"Find Your Song"	—	—	—	—	8
5	B'Avarija	"We All"	16	12	12	40	1
6	Saulės kliošas	"Singing in the Night"	24	5	4	33	3
7	Jolanta Tubinytė and King Lion	"I Wanna Hold You"	—	—	—	13	7
8	Naktinės Personos	"I'm So in Love"	—	—	—	—	4
9	IF	"If You Can"	—	—	—	—	12
10	Adoms	"Q-Ba-Ba"	—	—	—	9	9
11	Aivaras	"Happy You"	20	8	10	38	2
12	Rūta Lukoševičiūtė	"Hello"	—	—	—	—	5
13	Ramūnas Difartas and Dreams	"You'll Be Waiting"	—	—	—	21	6
14	La Vita	"Never"	—	—	—	6	10
15	Agnė	"Feelings"	—	—	—	—	11

=== Disqualification and replacement ===
Following B'Avarija's win during the Lithuanian national final, it was reported that "We All" had broken the Eurovision Song Contest rules as the Lithuanian version of the song, "Mes čia", was released on CD at the end of 2001. On 22 March, the European Broadcasting Union (EBU) confirmed the disqualification of the song. After an unsuccessful appeal made by LRT, runner-up of the national final, "Happy You" performed by Aivaras, was announced as the new Lithuanian Eurovision entry on 27 March.

== At Eurovision ==
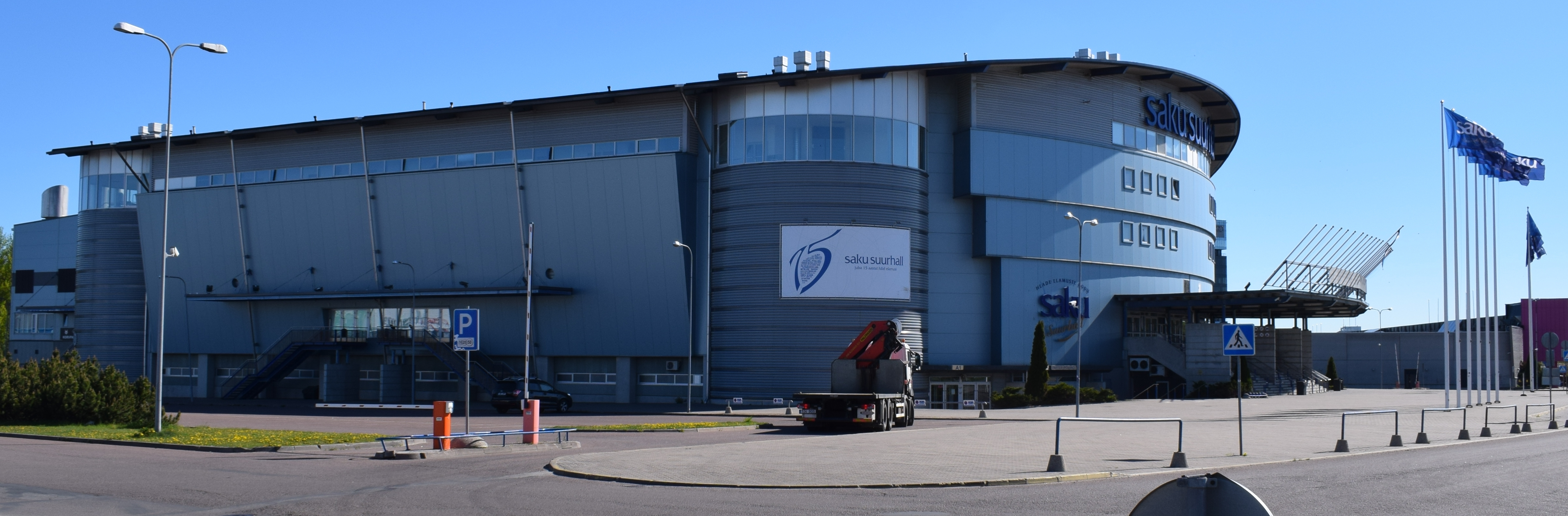
The Eurovision Song Contest 2002 took place at Saku Suurhall in Tallinn, Estonia.

The Eurovision Song Contest 2002 took place at Saku Suurhall in Tallinn, Estonia, on 25 May 2002. The participants list included the previous year's winning country, the "Big Four" countries, consisting of France, Germany, Spain, and the United Kingdom, any eligible countries which did not compete in the 2001 contest, and countries which had obtained the highest average points total at the previous year's contest, up to 24 total participants. According to Eurovision rules, all nations with the exceptions of the bottom six countries in the 2001 contest competed in the final. On 9 November 2001, an allocation draw was held which determined the running order and Lithuania was set to close the show and perform in position 24, following the entry from Latvia.

The show was broadcast in Lithuania on LTV with commentary by Darius Užkuraitis. At the end of the event, "Happy You" finished in 23rd place with 12 points, receiving points from three of the 24 participating countries.

=== Voting ===
Voting during the show involved each country awarding points from 1-8, 10 and 12 as determined by either 100% televoting or a combination of 50% televoting and 50% national jury. In cases where televoting was not possible, only the votes of the eight-member national juries were tabulated. The nation awarded its top 12 points to Latvia, while the highest point award it received was six points from Latvia. LRT appointed Loreta Tarozaitė as its spokesperson to announce the Lithuanian votes during the show. Below is a breakdown of points awarded to Lithuania and awarded by Lithuania in the contest.

Points awarded to Lithuania
Score	Country
12 points	
10 points	
8 points	
7 points	
6 points	Latvia
5 points	
4 points	Russia
3 points	
2 points	Estonia
1 point	

Points awarded by Lithuania
Score	Country
12 points	Latvia
10 points	Sweden
8 points	United Kingdom
7 points	Estonia
6 points	Russia
5 points	France
4 points	Cyprus
3 points	Malta
2 points	Belgium
1 point	Denmark
