= Tele Bim-Bam =

Tele Bim-Bam was a Lithuanian musical TV show for children and now children's singing group. The founder and long-time leader is Neringa Čereškevičienė.

The musical group was founded in 1990. The first telecasts of the TV show are dated by January 1, 1990. Initially, it was a monthly show for talented children, then it became a biweekly one, accumulating 313 hours of air time to its 20th anniversary.

Currently, Neringa operates a kindergarten and aesthetic education center with the same name, Tele Bim-Bam in Vilnius.

During over 20 years of the existence of the group over 70 children participated in it and the repertoire includes over 80 songs. Nearly all songs are for solo performance.

In January 2023 Tele Bim-Bam was awarded the "For services to Lithuanian music" award by the Music Association of the Year Awards at the ceremony fo year 2022.

== Notable songs ==
Most popular songs of the group, popular both among children and grown-ups, include „Mane barė“, „Voras“, „Televizorius“, „Baltoji varnelė“, „Naktelės žiedai“, „Musė“, „Pupa“, „Laivelis“, „Mamos suknelė“ „Jolantėlė“ „Kelionė pas pabaisą“, „Dantukas“, „Mes kitokie“, „Kiški piški“, „Motociklas“, etc.

In 2005 the song Pupa performed by Tele Bim-Bam took 4th place in the Lithuanian national finals for Eurovision song contest.

Rūta Pentiokinaitė and Merūnas Vitulskis earned the 2nd place in the 16th installation (season 5) of Žvaigždžių duetai (Lithuanian version of Celebrity Duets) with the song "Dvi draugės" ("Two Girl Friends") of Tele Bim-Bam. The couple had eventually won the 5th season of the show performing this song in the second round of the finals.

== People ==
Actress, singer, songwriter and performer Gabriele Malinauskaitė was born on 21 August 1986 in Vilnius, Lithuania. Gabriele was singing in Tele Bim-Bam group, hosted the Tele Bim-Bam show segment for girls „Girls', acted in various episodes of the show, and performed the role of Butterfly in the rock opera Voro vestuvės (The Spider’s Wedding, by the classic Lithuanian poem of Justinas Marcinkevičius with the same name, released for the 18th anniversary of the group) of Tele Bim-Bam.

Not all participants of Tele Bim-Bam continued to pursue musical careers, but some did.

== Discography ==
- Tele Bim- Bam Telebimbadienis, CD ASIN: B00D8EH97W
  Released to the 10th anniversary of the group
  1. peliuku mokykla 2. kiski-piski 3. busimdraugais 4. karakumu asilelis 5. supkit mane 6. kaledos 7. tilili, tilili 8. pupa 9. sirdele spaudzia 10. telebimbadienis
- Tele Bim-Bam – Voro vestuvės, BOD Group – SL-CD-001
- TELE BIM-BAM DIDŽIOJI KOLEKCIJA 1 dalis (4CD), ASIN: B017NXM5R
  Covering years 1990-2000
  CD1 1995 - TELE BIM-BAM, CD2 1996 - "Ne tik Vaikam", CD3 1997 - "Namelis ant Tele Bim-Bam Kojelės", CD4 2000 - "Telebimbadienis"
- TELE BIM-BAM DIDŽIOJI KOLEKCIJA 2 dalis (4CD), ASIN: B017NXKGAK
  Covering years 2000-2010
  CD5 2000 - Neringa iš TELE BIM-BAM "Bet Ne Vaikam", CD6 2004 - TELE BIM-BAM "Gatvė", CD7 2008 - Roko Opera "Voro Vestuvės", CD8 2010 - "Šok į Debesį"
- DVD TELE BIM-BAM "Visų laikų geriausi Tele Bim-Bam Videoklipai II dalis", EAN: 4771243131757
  19 selected video clips from 1991-2008

== Books ==
- 2000: Tele Bim-Bam Dainų Knyga (Tele Bim-Bam song book), ISBN 9986-87-937-X).
- 2015: Tele Bim-Bam Pasakos. O kas gi liko? (Tele Bim-Bam Fairy Tales: And What was Left?) ISBN 9786099577609
