= Rasa Kaušiūtė =

- Born: Rasa Kaušiūtė; March 29, 1977 (age 49); Panevėžys, Lithuanian SSR, Soviet Union
- Origin: Lithuania
- Genres: Pop, Jazz, Blues
- Occupations: Singer, songwriter, vocal coach
- Instrument: Vocals
- Years active: 2000–present
- Website: rasos.puslapiai.lt rasakausiute.frype.lt

Rasa Kaušiūtė (born 29 March 1977) is a Lithuanian singer, composer, and vocal teacher (works at Lithuanian Youth Center and prepares children for various song contests).

In 2000 she released her first album "Apie ką tu galvoji" ("What are you thinking of") with an experimental dance band "Enter-TOP".

Rasa became famous in 2004, when she successfully appeared in the national selection to the Eurovision Song Contest 2004 with her song He forgot that I'm his baby.

Rasa Kaušiūtė participated in many Lithuanian TV shows. She performed in LTV show called "Lietuvos Dainų Dešimtukas" ("Lithuanian TOP 10") (in 2006 she won the 2nd place in the final performing a song "Mano Meile" ("My Love") together with Robertas Kupstas). She also participated in the show "Iššūkis žvaigždėms" ("A challenge for the stars") several times.

In 2006 Rasa appeared in a popular TV show "Klasė" ("Class") on LTV.

She participated in various international song contests – "Astana" in 2005 (Kazakhstan), "Canzoni Del Mondo" (Italy).

Now Rasa is performing with duet "Ladies" and together with her band.

== Albums and awards ==
- 2000 the album "Apie ka tu galvoji" ("What are you thinking of") released
- 2001 the 1st prize in the contest "Durys – 2001" ("Doors of 2001") of the best composed song“
- 2010 the first solo album "Tu taip arti..." ("You are so close") released

== See also ==
- Lithuania in the Eurovision Song Contest 2005
