= 69 Danguje =

Lithuanian girl group

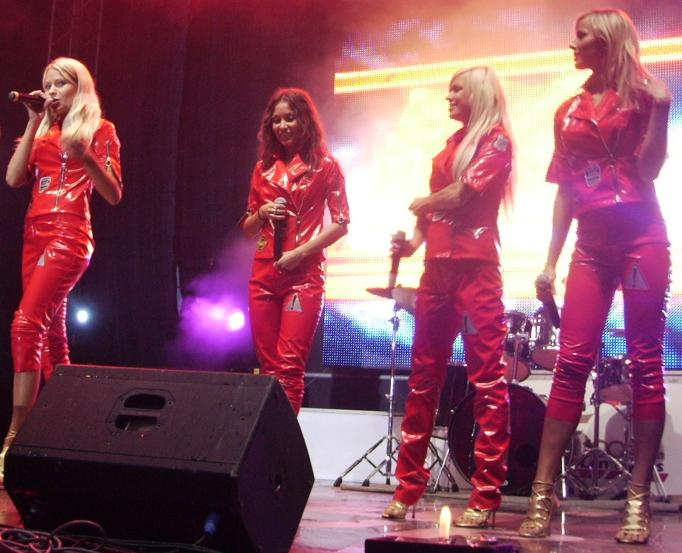
69 Danguje, 2006

69 Danguje (literally: In the 69th heaven) is a Lithuanian vocal pop music girl group founded in 2005. The founder of the group was producer Egmontas Bžeskas. In May 2024 three members separated and established a new group, Šeškės ("ferrets"). As of November 2025, legally, only N.Pareigytė-Rukaitienė and E. Bžeskas are the members of "69 Danguje".

== History ==
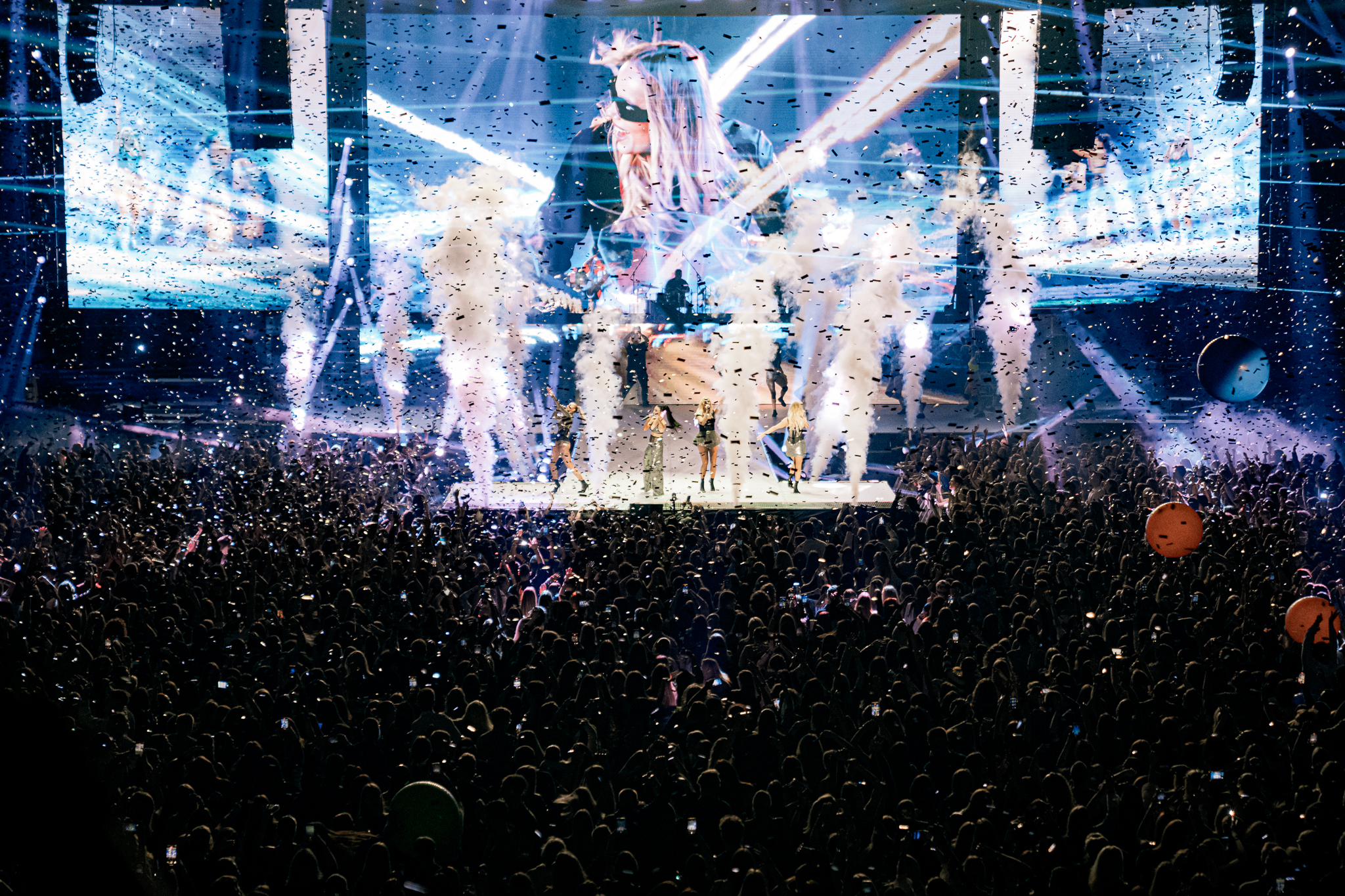
The Žalgiris Arena concert, 2024

In 2024, 69 danguje unveiled a new song and video "Aš prašau". In the same year, the band held a concert "Velniškas greitis 20 metų" to celebrate their 20th year of activity at Kaunas Žalgiris Arena.

=== Šeškės ===
In May 2024 the group announced that Nijolė is leaving the group and the group will be called Šeškės ("ferrets"), because Bžeskas owns the trademark 69 Danguje and the group had not been cooperating with Bžeskas for ten years, and his lawyers notified the group that they can no longer use their old name. In TV interviews later that year it was revealed that the departure of Nijolė was due to a conflict between her and the rest of the group.

Šeškės claimed that for about 10 years Bžeskas did not work with the group and they filed a request to the State Patent Office for cancellation of the registration of the trademark 69 DANGUJE due to non-use. The trademark was registered in June 2007 and was to be valid until August 2026. In July 2025 the Patent Office granted the cancellation request. However Bžeskas intended to appeal the decision.

In August 2024 a 85 min. documentary 69 išpažintis ("69 Confession") about the group was premiered.

On August 13, 2024, after a long break in releases of new songs, Šeškės presented a new song, "Paleidom" ("Let It Go"). In preparation for their concert tour, in November 2024 they presented the second new song, "Nebesugrįšiu" ("I Won't Come Back") In August 2025 they presented their new song and videoclip "Kol dar vasara" ["While it is still summer"]. The music video is made with a Japanese flavor, and the song is "about love, relationships and their fragility and value".

== Names ==
Bžeskas recalls that in their first small studio there was an inscription on the wall "9 danguje" ("in the 9th heaven") (Note: "9 danguje" ("in the 9th heaven") in Lithuanian has the same meaning as English "in the seventh heaven") and I thought that if we would add "6" in front, then we would be even higher.

The group took the name Šeškės ("ferrets"), because it was their nickname already.

== Members ==
- Goda Alijeva (Goda Sabutytė-Alijeva) (Note: Goda Alijeva was born on June 4, 1986, she was also a member of the group "Lukas ir Goda" (with Lukas Pačkauskas) In mid-2010s she tried herself in the business of fashion, and in 2025 she decided to return to this activity by opeining an onlne store with her brand "byGA" or sports and leisure clothing, decorated with bright colors and patterns.)
- Karina Krysko
- Ingrida Martinkėnaitė (Note: Ingrida Martinkėnaitė was born on September 15, 1978. She was married to lawyer Mindaugas Urbonas for nearly 8 years, divorced in 2024. They have daughter Eva. Ingrida also has daughter Marija from the previous relationship with Andrejus Velijevas, divorced in May 2015)
- Nijolė Pareigytė (Nijolė Pareigytė Rukaitienė) (Note: Nijolė Pareigytė-Rukaitienė was born on November 27, 1984 in Klaipėda She is married to Rimvydas Rukaitis and they have daughter Paticija)

The initial setup was Karina, Nijolė and Ingrida. Later Goda joined, a former member of another girl group, YVA. Since May 2024, Goda, Karina, and Ingrida are members of the group Šeškės.

== Albums ==
- 2006: 9 Danguj
- 2007: 69 Danguje
- 2008: Veidrodėlis ("Mirror")
- 2012: Geriausios Mūsų Dainos ("Our Best Songs", compilation album)

== Awards ==
- 2007:
  - Radiocentras Music Awards: Group of the Year
  - Children's Voice awards: Group of the Year; also, theirs was Song of the Year, "Gyvenu"
- 2006: Radiocentras Music Awards: Best Debut of the previous year
- 2024: Golden Drop 2023 by Lietus.fm ("Rain") radio station: Group of the Year
