= Linas and Simona =

Lithuanian music duo

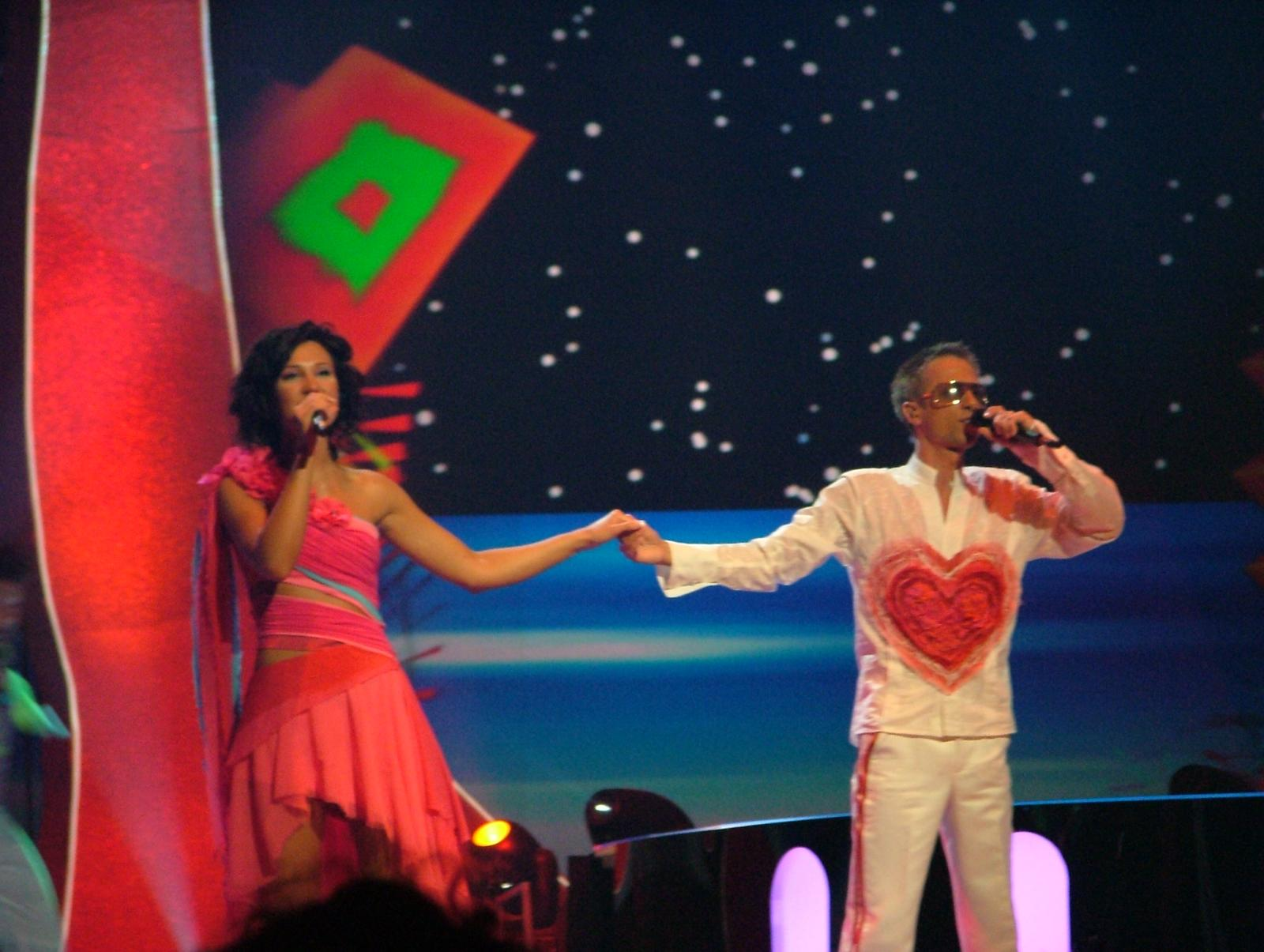
Linas and Simona performing at ESC 2004.

Linas and Simona was a music duo that represented Lithuania in the Eurovision Song Contest 2004. With 26 points, they placed 16th in the semifinal and could not participate in the final. However, they befriended Ruslana, the winner of Eurovision 2004, and together recorded Fight for Love and Freedom.

The song was released in their album, I Love U, on 22 July 2005. In 2005, they were representatives of an anti-AIDS campaign in Lithuania. The couple separated in late 2007, ending the duo. Their last work, live album Linas and Simona presents UAB MUSIC Live featuring Stasys Povilaitis and Violeta Riaubiškytė, was released in February 2008.

== Members ==
- Linas Adomaitis (born 10 April 1976) came from the family of a professional violinist. He attended music school in his youth and holds a master's degree from the Lithuanian Academy of Music and Theatre. Adomaitis started his music career in 1995 with the quartet called L+. The band played in an R&B style. They released four albums before breaking up in 2000. Linas then started his solo career.
- Simona Jakubėnaitė (born 1984) participated in about 15 large international music festivals before taking part in the Fizz Superstar contest in 2002. The show was very similar to American Idol and took place in the three Baltic states. Jakubėnaitė did not win the contest, but met Adomaitis, and they started working together. Initially, she was his backing singer. After the end of the duo, she went to study at the Berklee College of Music.

Awards and achievements
Preceded by Aivaras with "Happy You"	Lithuania in the Eurovision Song Contest; 2004	Succeeded by Laura and the Lovers with "Little by Little"
