= Laura and the Lovers =

Lithuanian band

- Origin: Lithuania
- Genres: Pop, pop-rock
- Years active: 2005-2008 or 2009
- Past members: Laura Čepukaitė; Donatas Paulauskas; Martynas Lukoševičius; Audrius Piragis

Laura and the Lovers was a Lithuanian pop band. It is most known for representing Lithuania at Eurovision Song Contest 2005.

At Eurovision 2005, Laura and the Lovers performed a song called "Little by Little". The song was performed 2nd in the running order, after Austria and before Portugal. The song was not announced as one of the top 10 qualifiers and was later confirmed to have finished last (25th) in the semifinal with 17 points.. In 2008 or 2009, they stopped musical group's career due to financial difficulties and the crisis.

== Discography ==
=== Albums ===
- Tarp krintančių lapų (2006)

=== Singles ===
- "Little by Little" (2005)

Awards and achievements
Preceded by Linas and Simona with "What's Happened to Your Love?"	Lithuania in the Eurovision Song Contest; 2005	Succeeded by LT United with "We Are the Winners"
