= N.E.O. (band) =

Lithuanian band

- Origin: Kaunas, Lithuania
- Genres: Pop, Electropop
- Years active: 2000–present
- Labels: Zuzi Records
- Members: Raigardas Tautkus; Evaldas Kondrackis; Marius Kiltinavičius; Martynas Beinaris (since 2009)
- Past members: Tadas Lukoševičius (2000–2009)

N.E.O. (acronym for New Electronic Opus) is a Lithuanian electropop and pop music band of four guys formed in Kaunas in 2000. At first the band's activities were irregular as its members were preoccupied with school. In summer 2004, the band released its first radio single Aš tikiu (I Believe).

In the national selection for Eurovision Song Contest 2005 the band performed song You are in Hollywood, reached the final and was noticed. It further released radio singles and at the end of 2005 compiled them into the debut album Tavo delne (In Your Palm), featuring eight radio singles and six other songs. In February 2006, a televised concert at Forum Palace, which included appearances from Mango, Žas, and Mokinukės, presented the album to the public. In 2006 national selection for Eurovision, N.E.O. performed Alright, which received jury's vote but placed only 7th after televote. At the end of 2006, the band released its second album Akimirka (Moment). As a promotion, all four members signed all 10,000 copies of the initial run. N.E.O. was nominated for 2007 Radiocentras Awards in categories Best Band and Best Song for Akimirka. After 2006, N.E.O. became less active as its leader Tautkus was involved in Kelias į žvaigždes (music show on LNK) and other projects, Kiltinavičius became part of a public love triangle, and Lukoševičius lost his father.

In December 2009, it was announced that long time member Tadas Lukoševičius was replaced by Martynas Beinaris, participant in Žvaigždžių vartai, a talent show on TV3.

== Studio albums ==
- Tavo delne (2005)
- Akimirka (2006)
