= Radiocentras (Lithuanian radio station) =

Coordinates: 54.7014°N 25.2214°E

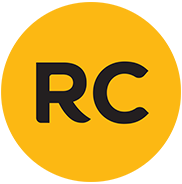
- Lithuania
- Broadcast area: Lithuania
- Frequencies: Vilnius 101,5 MHz FM; Kaunas 107,1 MHz FM; Klaipėda 101,5 MHz FM; Šiauliai 92,2 MHz FM; Panevėžys 101,4 MHz FM; Alytus 101,1 MHz FM; Biržai 105,5 MHz FM; Druskininkai 101,6 MHz FM; Ignalina 102,7 MHz FM; Jonava 101,3 MHz FM; Marijampolė 101,8 MHz FM; Plungė 97,7 MHz FM; Raseiniai 99,9 MHz FM; Tauragė 102,7 MHz FM; Telšiai 91,2 MHz FM; Ukmergė 99,5 MHz FM; Utena 101,0 MHz FM; Kėdainiai 95,2 MHz FM; Rokiškis 100,0 MHz FM

Ownership
- Owner: UAB „Radiocentras“

Links
- Website: http://rc.lt/

Radiocentras is a commercial radio station in Lithuania, broadcasting from the capital city of Vilnius. Radiocentras was established in 1991.
