= Violeta Riaubiškytė-Tarasovienė =

- Violeta Riaubiskyte – Tarasoviene, at her "Su Meile" (With Love) Album concert, in Vilnius, Lithuania

Background information
- Born: Violeta Riaubiškytė; 25 August 1974 (age 51); Vilnius, Lithuania
- Genres: Pop, R&B, Dance-Pop, Adult Contemporary
- Occupations: Singer, songwriter, television presenter
- Labels: Muzikine Partija, MONACO
- Website: www.violeta-vilius.lt

Violeta Riaubiškytė-Tarasovienė (born 25 August 1974) is a Lithuanian singer and show host. She used to be the co-host of a Lithuanian music show "Penktadienio muzikos šou" (Friday Music Show) alongside Edmundas Kučinskas and also, and the co-host of a music show "Padainuokim!" (Let's Sing!) alongside her husband Vilius Tarasovas.

She was married to Robertas Merzvinskas and had a daughter, Elinga with him, however she divorced him at the age of 25. On 31 August 2007, she married B'Avarija star Vilius Tarasovas, and on 5 March 2008 her second daughter Gabrielė was born. Violeta Tarasovienė lives in a seaport Klaipėda. She has released three studio albums and three DVDs which made her one of the most famous and best paid Lithuanian performers. In particular, her hit "Kas Butu, (Jeigu Butu)" (What would it be like (if it happened)) was one of the TOP Lithuanian hits and stayed the top for well over nine weeks.

== Early life and career ==
Violeta started her career being a dancer, at the age of 17 she began to sing in restaurants and was part of a small Lithuanian band "Belmondo". She studied for 6 years and graduated at the Balys Dvarionas Music School. At 18, when she graduated from secondary school, she received an offer to work in the United Arab Emirates. She accepted, because at that time, a singer in Lithuania was very far from being amongst highly paid jobs, whereas in the UAE the hotels/restaurants offered good money and also took full care of their employees. After a couple of years, when she returned to Lithuania, she was offered to sing with the group "Žvaigždių Kvartetai" and did so until she started her solo career through which she gained extreme popularity. She was later accepted to be the co-host of the comedy show "Orbita" alongside Algis Ramanauskas - Greitai, which gave her career a huge boost, transforming her into one of the most popular and wanted Lithuanian artists.

When the comedy show finished, Violeta received another two outstanding offers. Firstly, hosting a morning show on the radio station "M-1" and secondly being the co-host of the TV show "Penktadienio muzikos šou" (Friday Music Show) alongside Edmundas Kučinskas. By 2004, she released her first album "Ramunę baltąją" (Daisy the White, selling well over 40,000 copies which is double platinum in Lithuania) due to her enormous hit, after which the album was named. Similarly, by 2006, she released her second album "Su meile" (With Love, which had a somewhat more adult oriented pop sound), and finally in 2008, her third album "Aš būsiu šalia" "I Will Be Close", was released, which is said to be her best and most popular album containing music with an extreme sense of feeling and emotion. She has released 2 DVDs alongside her first two albums, and another one with her third, on which both she and her husband performed their songs. Violeta has also released many singles including: The Song About You And Me, With You and many others.

== Awards ==
- "Bravo" (Female Artist of The Year)
- "Kids' Voice Awards"

(Both as Best Singer)

== Albums ==
=== "Ramunę Baltają" (2004) ===
1. Ramunę baltąją (White Daisy)
2. Man reikia tavęs (I need you)
3. Tegul Spindi Tavo Šypsena (with Edmundas Kučinskas) (Keep your smile everlasting)
4. O, Prašau, Nepalik Tik Manęs Tu (O, please, don't leave me)
5. Vaikinai Yra Vaikinai (A guy is a guy)
6. Visai Neseniai (Not so long ago)
7. Nebegrįšiu Laukų Takeliu (With Sadūnai) (I won't take the same path)
8. Kai Snaigės Nusileis Is Debesų (When snowflakes drop from the sky)
9. Kelias Pas Tave (with Povilas Meškėla) (The path to you)
10. Oi palauk, palauk (with her daughter Elinga on DVD) (Lithuanian Que Sera, Sera)
11. Paskutinį Sekmadienį (Last Sunday)
12. Su Tavim Gera (with Steponas Januška) (It's good to be with you)
13. Aš Būsiu Tokia (I'll be me)
14. Tu Visko Pradžia (Your everything's beginning)
15. Laiškas (with Žvaigždių Kvartetai) (Note)
16. Naktelė (The Night)
17. Meilės Istorija (Love's history)
18. Traviata. Užstalės daina (with Virgilijus Noreika) (La Traviata)

=== "Su Meile" (2006) ===
1. Pas Tave Einu (I'm coming to you) (Lithuanian: I will love again)
2. Vel Kvepia Žiedai (The petals are alive)
3. Sugrįžk (Come back)
4. Tiktai Tu (Only you)
5. Kai Myliu Tave (When I love you)
6. Lėkė Sakalėlis (Run bird, run)
7. Aš Tavo (With B'avarija) (I'm yours)
8. How Much Love?..
9. Aš Dar Tave Myliu (I still love you)
10. Lėlė (Doll)
11. Paleisk (Let Go!)
12. Tavo Glėbyje (In your arms)

=== "Aš Būsiu Šalia" (2008) ===
1. Kas Būtų, Jeigu Būtų (What would be, if it happened...)
2. Dek (Burn!)
3. Viskas Baigta (Everything's finished)
4. Aš Būsiu Šalia (I will be close)
5. Kol Tu Ne Čia (While you're not here)
6. Nenoriu (I don't want it)
7. Nieko Nera Geriau (There's nothing better)
8. Leiski Mylėt Tave (Let me love you)
9. Noriu Pranykti Tavyje (I want to disappear in you)
10. Vėl ir Vėl (Again and Again)
11. Laikas Pasakyti Myliu (It's to tell you: I love you)
12. Ar Žinai (Do you know?)
13. Tu Numegzk Man, Mama, Kelia (Mum, show me the way)

== See also ==
- Lithuania in the Eurovision Song Contest 1999
- Lithuania in the Eurovision Song Contest 2005
- Lithuania in the Eurovision Song Contest 2009
