= Karina Krysko =

Lithuanian singer (born 1981)

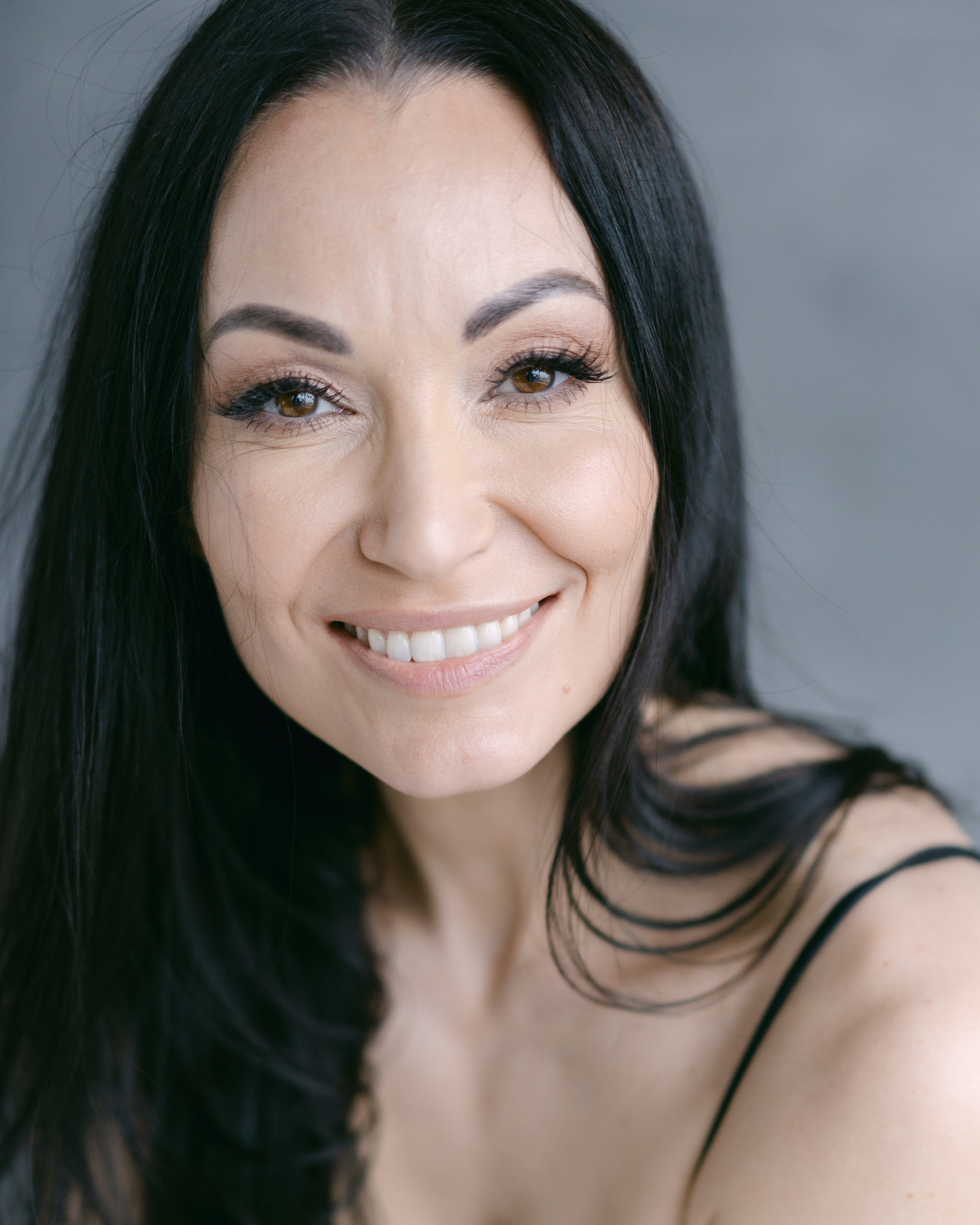
Karina Krysko, 2021

Karina Krysko (born May 14, 1981) is a Lithuanian singer and TV presenter, a member of the girl group 69 Danguje, with which she started her musical career. She is one of three girls who disengaged from 9 Danguje to create a group Šeškės.

In 2007-2009, she was the presenter of three TV shows, and a participant in various dance and music TV projects.

In 2008 she with Saulius Skambinas represented Lithuania in the Eurovision Dance Contest and won the 4th place.

== Personal life ==
In 2019 she divorced dancer Saulius Skambinas and the next year she announced her engagement with the singer Jeronimas Milius. (Note: Due to marriages, she is also known under legal names Karina Krysko‐Skambinė and Karina Milė.)
