= Aivaras Stepukonis =

Lithuanian musician and philosopher

Aivaras Stepukonis (born 28 September 1972) is a Lithuanian musician and philosopher.

== Biography ==
From 1983 to 1986, he studied at the Kaunas music school Nr. 1, and from 1987 to 1991, he studied at Kauno konservatorija (the clarinet class). From 1992 to 1994, Stepukonis earned a baccalaureate in theology and philosophy from the Franciscan University of Steubenville (Ohio, United States) in 1995, and a master's degree from the International Academy of Philosophy in Schaan (Liechtenstein) in 1997. From 2001 to 2005, he received his doctorate in philosophy at the Lithuanian Culture, Philosophy, and Art Research Institute in Vilnius. In 2005, he defended his PhD thesis at the institute. In the same year, he published a monograph on Max Scheler and the sociology of knowledge (Pavergto mąstymo problema: Maxas Scheleris ir žinojimo sociologijos ištakos; ISBN 9986-638-65-8). In 2007, he received a research fellowship from UNESCO and Keizō Obuchi to study at the University of Hawaiʻi. Since 2005, he has been a Senior Fellow at the Institute for Science Lithuanian Cultural Studies. Since 2007, he is also a director of UAB "Kranto studijos".

He was the vocalist for a band called Pėdsakai (Footprints) from 1998 until 2001, when he decided to start a solo career. He was nominated as the Artist of the year for the 2001 Bravo awards. In the national selections for the Eurovision Song Contest 2002, he placed second. Nevertheless, he was allowed to represent Lithuania with the song Happy You at the international final in Tallinn because the winners B'Avarija were disqualified. Aivaras was not very successful, reaching only 23rd place. Since then, Stepukonis has released three solo albums: eponymous Aivaras, Myliu arba tyliu, and Sage & Fool. After the second album, he retired from the stage, working as a composer and sound director with other artists.

== Discography ==
- Aivaras (2002)
- Myliu arba tyliu (2005)
- Sage & Fool (2010)

Awards and achievements
Preceded by Skamp with "You Got Style"	Lithuania in the Eurovision Song Contest; 2002	Succeeded by Linas and Simona with "What's Happened to Your Love?"
