= Skamp =

Lithuanian band

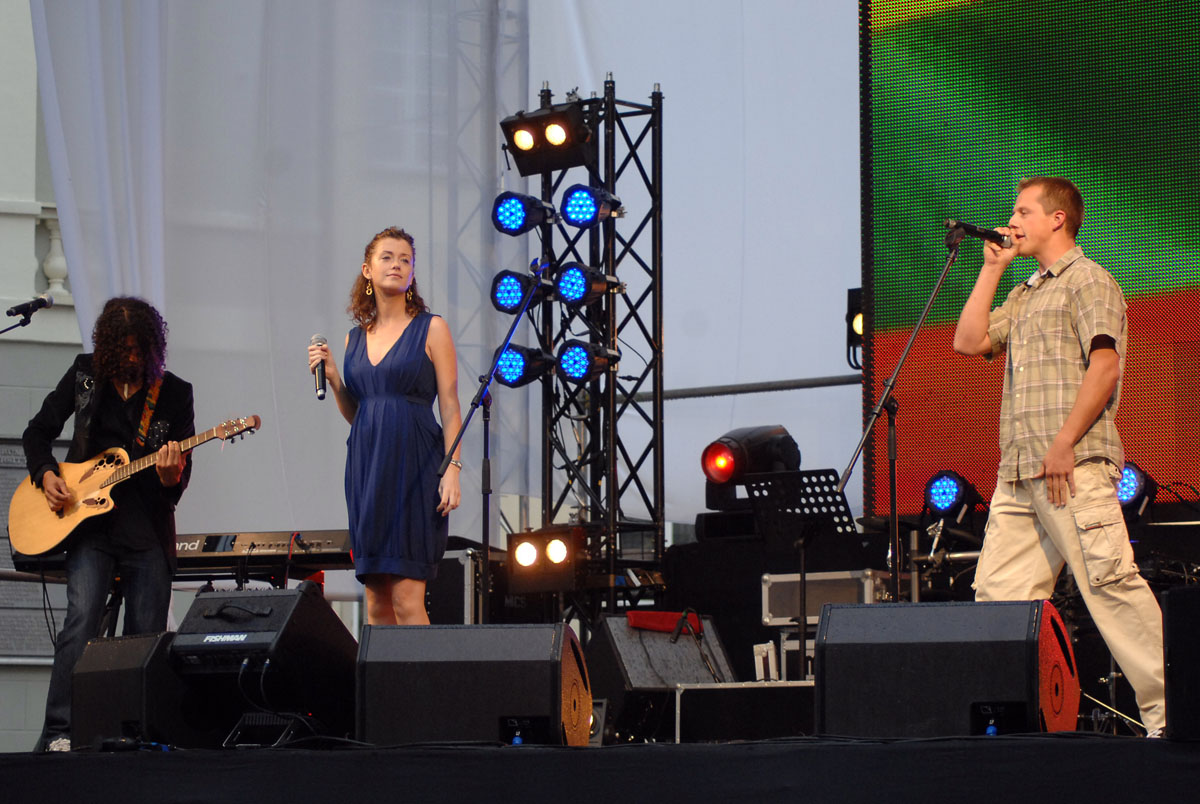

Background information
- Origin: Vilnius, Lithuania
- Genres: Pop-rock, Ska, Rap/Hip-hop
- Years active: 1998–present
- Labels: Tabami Records; Melodija Records; Koja Records Group
- Members: Erica Jennings; Viktoras "Vee" Diawara; Vilius Alesius
- Website: www.skamp.lt

Skamp (stylised in all caps) is a Lithuanian pop band.

== About ==
Skamp blends pop, rock, Hip Hop, and reggae genres. Skamp rose to fame in Lithuania in May 1998, with a cover of George Gershwin's Summertime. The song was a success in Lithuania, and the band went on to release six studio albums. The members have also pursued several independent projects. Skamp have supported several world-famous artists and groups, such as The Black Eyed Peas, Wheatus, and Bomfunk MCs. Over the years, the trio have garnered many awards including Best Debut (1999), Best Band (2000, 2001, 2004 & 2005), and Best Album (2000, 2001 & 2004). Erica has won "Best Female Artist" twice (2001 & 2002) and Vee received "Best Producer" in 2000. In 2007, the video for their song "Reach" was premiered on the very first MTV BALTICS "Making The Video". MTV BALTICS first "MTV LIVE" show aired "SKAMP - Live&Deadly" (DVD), and it was the first time an entire week was dedicated to one band. In 2008, they released their 6th studio album, Kazka, which spawned hits such as "Always Too Much", "Ten Kur Tu", and "Sportas". Nominated for "BEST BALTIC ACT" at the MTV European Music Awards for both 2007 and 2008.

=== Eurovision ===
Skamp appeared in the Eurovision Song Contest 2001 held in Copenhagen, Denmark with their song "You Got Style". They finished in 13th place with 35 points which, at the time, was Lithuania's highest position in the contest until the Eurovision Song Contest 2006, when LT United finished in 6th. Victor Diawara was also a member of LT United.

== Members ==
- Erica Jennings – lyrics, vocals. She is of Irish nationality and speaks Lithuanian.
- Viktoras "Vee" Diawara – producer, lyrics, vocals, guitar. He was born in Vilnius to a Malian father and a Lithuanian mother. He speaks fluent French and Lithuanian.
- Vilius Alesius – lyrics, vocals

== Discography ==
=== Studio albums ===
- Angata (1999, Koja Records Group) released in MC and CD
- Green (2000, Koja Records Group) released in MC and CD
- Le Boom-Chick (2000, Koja Records Group) released in MC and CD
- Skempinligė (2001, Koja Records Group) released in MC and CD
- Project: Tolerance (2001, Koja Records Group) released in MC and CD
- Reach (2004, Melodija Records / Tabami Records) released in CD
- Deadly (2005, Melodija Records / Tabami Records) released in CD
- Le Boom-Chick Vol.2 (2007, Melodija Records / Tabami Records) released in CD
- Kažką?! (2008, Tabami Records) released in CD

=== Live albums ===
- Live & Deadly (2007, Melodija Records / Tabami Records) released in CD

=== Singles ===
- Summertime (1998, Koja Records Group) released in MC
- You Got Style (2001, Koja Records Group) released in MC and CD
- Musų Dienos Kaip Šventė (2002, Tabami Records) released in MC and CD
- Split The Atom (Na Na Na) (2004, Melodija Records) released in CD
- A Ka Guelen'2006 (2006, Melodija Records) released in CD

=== Video albums ===
- Live & Deadly (2007, Melodija Records / Tabami Records) released in DVD

=== Solo albums ===
- Erica Jennings Coming Home For Christmas (2002, Tabami Records) released in CD
- Willux Kelias, kuriuo aš einu (2003, Koja Records Group) released in MC and CD

=== Notable singles ===
- Summertime (1998) released on MC single
- Nieko Panašaus featuring A.Mamontovas (1998)
- What We Gonna Leave (2000) from album Green (2000)
- Fishy featuring Psichas (2000) from album Lee Boom Chick(2000)
- You Got Style (2001) released on CD&MC singles
- Superstar (2001) from album Skempinligė (2001)
- Mūsų Dienos Kaip Šventė featuring V.Kernagis (2002) released on CD single
- Split The Atom (Na Na Na) (2004) released on CD single
- Calling After Me (2004) from album Reach (2004)
- A Ka Guelen'2006 (2006) released on CD single
- Reach featuring Pushas (2007)
- Revolution featuring Kick Punch Gang (2012)

=== Videos ===
- Summertime (1998)
- Nieko Panašaus featuring A.Mamontovas (1998)
- You Got Style (2001)
- Mūsų Dienos Kaip Šventė featuring V.Kernagis (2002)
- Calling After Me (2004)
- L'attente (2005)
- Reach featuring Pushas (2007)
- Always Too Much (2008)
- Revolution featuring Kick Punch Gang (2012)

Awards and achievements
Preceded by Aistė with "Strazdas"	Lithuania in the Eurovision Song Contest; 2001	Succeeded by Aivaras with "Happy You"
