= Kaukės =

- Genre: Reality television Game show
- Based on: King of Mask Singer by Munhwa Broadcasting Corporation
- Presented by: Giedrius Savickas
- Starring: Aleksandras Pogrebnojus (1 s.); Darjuš Lavrinovič (1–2 s.); Kšyštof Lavrinovič (1–2 s.); Indrė Kavaliauskaitė-Morkūnienė (1–2 s.); Livija Gradauskienė (1–2 s.); Vaidotas Valiukevičius (1–2 s.); Monika Liu (2-4 s.); Paul de Miko (3 s.); Rūta Ščiogolevaitė (3 s.); Vidas Bareikis (3 s.); Robertas Kalinkinas (3-4 s.); Simona Nainė (4 s.); Toma Vaškevičiūtė (4 s.); Stano (4 s.); Dainius Kazlauskas (5 s.); Laurynas Suodaitis (5 s.); Liepa Mondeikaitė (5 s.); Remis Retro (5 s.); Ugnė Siparė (5 s.)
- Opening theme: "Give Me Your Love" by Sigala ft. John Newman & Nile Rodgers (1 – 2 s.) "24K Magic" by Bruno Mars (3 s.)
- Country of origin: Lithuania
- Original language: Lithuanian
- No. of seasons: 5
- No. of episodes: 64

Original release
- Network: LNK
- Release: 13 September 2020 – 15 February 2025

Related
- Masked Singer franchise King of Mask Singer; Balss Maskā

Kaukės (Masks) is a Lithuanian reality singing competition television series based on the Masked Singer franchise which originated from the South Korean version of the show King of Mask Singer. Production was announced in November 2019. The first season premiered on LNK on 13 September 2020.

== Production ==
A group of celebrities compete anonymously on stage, singing in full costumes over a series of episodes. The competing celebrities have to sign strict confidentiality agreement and they cannot tell anybody (their friends and families) that they are competing in project Kaukės. During interviews their voices are distorted by special programs and they only sing as best as they can without any special effects. Each episode, a portion of the competitors are paired off into face-off competitions, in which each will perform a song of his or her choice. From each face-off, the panelists vote: the winners safe for the week, while the loser is put up for elimination. At the end of the episode, the losers of the face-offs are then subjected to new votes of the panelists to determine who will not continue; the eliminated singer then enters the stage where they turn their back to the camera, takes off their mask, then turn around to reveal his/her identity.

In addition to the singing competition, hints to each masked singer's identity are offered during the show. Pre-taped interviews are given as hints and feature the celebrities' distorted voices. The panelists are given time to speculate the identity of the singer after the performance and ask them a single question, or the contestant provides a clue about themselves or they bring their things as clues and panelists try to determine their identity. In the first season the winner was picked by panelists, in the second, panelists had only one option to pick the third-place winner and for the last two contestants only the audience voted and picked the winner. And in the third season only the audience voted for all three contestants.

The process of contestants getting to the arena is that they are getting messages from the director as to where they need to drive to the agreed place. Later they are picked up from that place by guards in a car with tinted windows. Contestants have to put on a black hoodie and black face shield. The arena is cleared so that no people can enter there and the contestant is lead to his or her room by guards. They spend whole day in that room and they cannot leave that room alone. They have contacts to people that they can only talk to. Only five people know who competes in the project. Then the time comes for the contestant to perform, and they put on their costumes (there are helped by stylists to put on costumes) and they go to stage to perform.

=== Costumes ===
The costumes are partly replicates that were used in other international versions as well as national motifs such as Šakotis.

== Panelists and host ==
Season 1 panelists and host
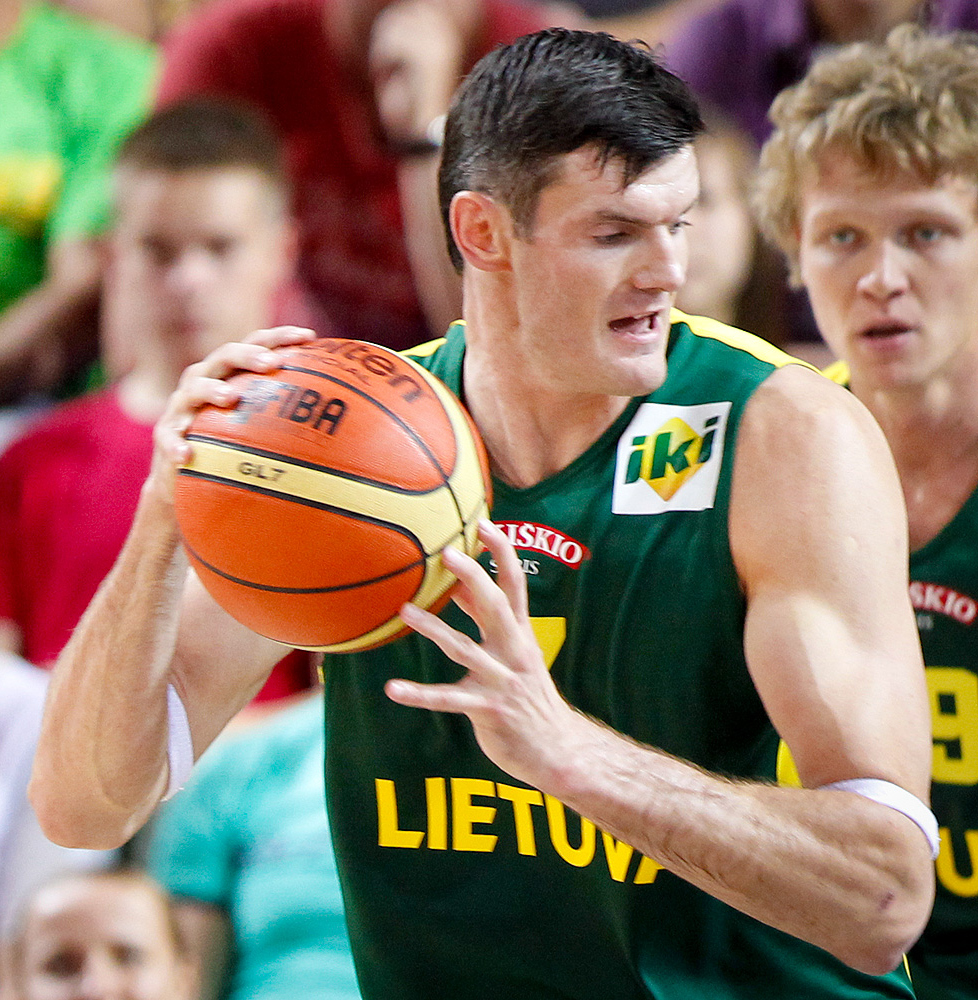
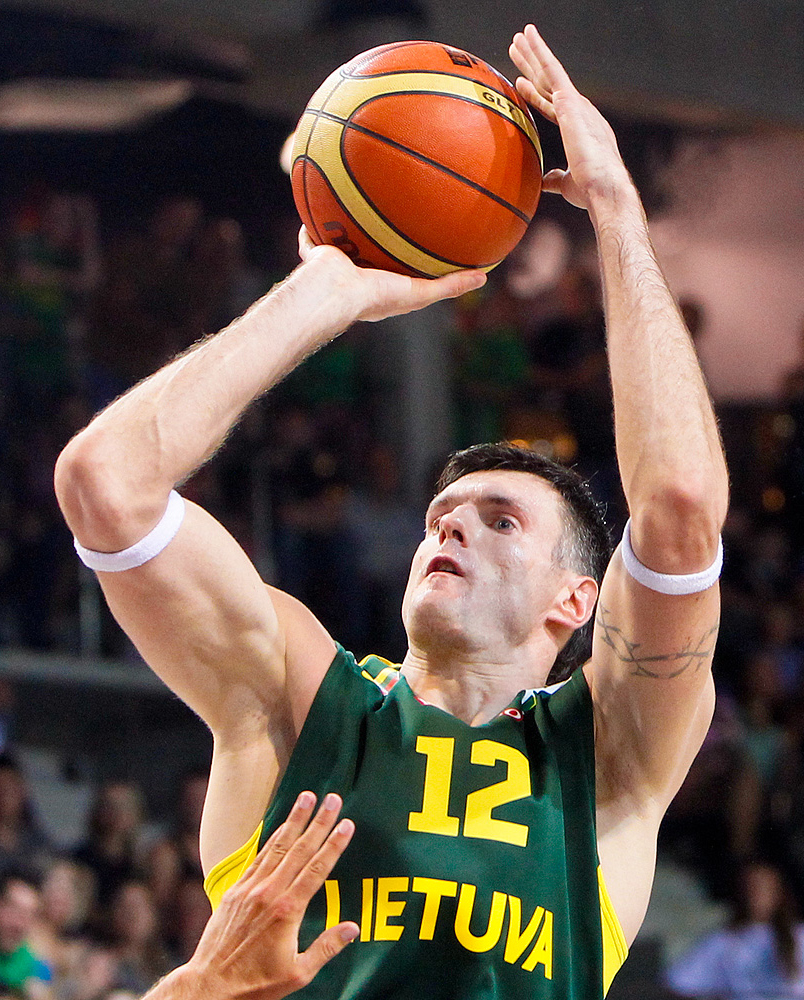
The Lavrinovič Brothers

Popular actor and comedian Giedrius Savickas presents the show. The panel includes Vaidotas Valiukevičius, lead-singer of The Roop, radio host Livija Gradauskiene, TV host Indre Kavaliauskaite, fashion designer Aleksandras Pogrebnojus and the basketball players Darju and Krzysztof Lavrinovic. Later on season 2 Aleksandras Pogrebnojus wasn't on the panel anymore. His place took singer Monika Liu. On the 3rd season there was a new panel. Monika Liu continued as panelist and there have been 4 new panelists: singer Vidas Bareikis, singer and winner of Kaukės season 1 Rūta Ščiogolevaitė, influencer Paul de Miko and designer Robertas Kalinkinas.

On the 4th season Monika Liu and Robertas Kalinkinas continued to be panelists and there were 3 new panelists: Toma Vaškevičiūtė (she previously participated in the first season as "Pelėda"), Simona Nainė (she previously participated as guest mask in the third season as "Ančiukas") and Stano (he previously participated and won the third season as "Burokėlis")

== Guest masks & panelists ==
On later episodes guest masks made an appearance by performing a song out of competition at the beginning of the show. The panel then gave their guesses before an instant reveal. The guests then occasionally joined the panel for the ongoing episode.

| Episode | Name | Notability | Ref. |
|---|---|---|---|
| 8 | Justė Žičkutė ("Šienas") | TV Host | |
| 9 | Leonardas Pobedonoscevas ("Elnias") | Actor | |
| 9 | Tatjana Lavrinovič ("Gėlė") | Former Mrs Globe winner | |
| 11 | Edgaras Lubys ("Elnias") | Musician | |
| 11 | Ironvytas ("Šienas") | Rapper | |
| 11 | Samanta Tīna ("Gėlė") | Singer | |
| 8 | Nerijus Juška ("Kiaušinis") | Ballet Dancer | |
| 9 | Danas Rapšys ("Pingvinas") | Swimmer | |
| 9 | Karolina Meschino ("Ledai") | Influencer | |
| 11 | Rokas Bernatonis ("Kūgis") | Magician | |
| 12 | Simona Nainė ("Ančiukas") | Businesswoman | |
| 12 | Indrė Stonkuvienė ("Fejerverkas") | Influencer | |

== Season synopsis ==
Series overview
| Series | Contestants | Episodes | Originally released | | Winner | Runner-up | Third place |
| Series | Contestants | Episodes | First released | Last released | Winner | Runner-up | Third place |
|---|---|---|---|---|---|---|---|
| 1 | 13 | 11 | 13 September 2020 | 6 December 2020 | Rūta Ščiogolevaitė as "Unicorn" | Ilona Balsytė as "Ladybug" | Simonas Storpirštis as "Hen" |
| 2 | 13 | 11 | 12 September 2021 | 21 November 2021 | Martynas Kavaliauskas as "Ram" | Deivydas Zvonkus as "Superhero" | Ieva Zasimauskaitė as "Moon" |
| 3 | 16 | 14 | 11 September 2022 | 11 December 2022 | Stano as "Beetroot" | Augustė Vedrickaitė as "Doll" | Naglis Bierancas as "Hydra" |
| 4 | 16 | 14 | 10 September 2023 | 10 December 2023 | Dainius Kazlauskas as "Raven" | Ugnė Siparė as "Alien" | Anyanya Udongwo as "Hedgehog" |
| 5 | 16 | 14 | 16 November 2024 | 15 February 2025 | Arnas Ašmonas as "Zebra" | Linas Vaitkevičius as "Tiger" | Marius Repšys as "Walrus" |

== Season 1 (2020) ==
| Stage name | Celebrity | Notability | Episodes | | | | | | | | | | |
| Stage name | Celebrity | Notability | 1 | 2 | 3 | 4 | 5 | 6 | 7 | 8 | 9 | 10 | 11 |
|---|---|---|---|---|---|---|---|---|---|---|---|---|---|
| Vienaragis ("Unicorn") | Rūta Ščiogolevaitė | Singer | | WIN | SAFE | SAFE | SAFE | SAFE | SAFE | SAFE | RISK | RISK | WINNER |
| Boružėlė ("Ladybug") | Ilona Balsytė | Actress | | WIN | SAFE | SAFE | SAFE | RISK | SAFE | SAFE | SAFE | WIN | RUNNER-UP |
| Višta ("Hen") (WC) | Simonas Storpirštis | Actor | | | | | | | SAFE | SAFE | SAFE | WIN | THIRD |
| Lapė ("Fox") | Inga Stumbrienė | Businesswoman | WIN | | SAFE | RISK | SAFE | SAFE | SAFE | SAFE | SAFE | OUT | |
| Pelėda ("Owl") | Toma Vaškevičiūtė | Actress | | WIN | RISK | SAFE | RISK | SAFE | SAFE | RISK | OUT | | |
| Liūtas ("Lion") | Egidijus Sipavičius | Singer | WIN | | SAFE | SAFE | SAFE | SAFE | RISK | OUT | | | |
| Šakotis ("Spit Cake") | Andrius Bialobzeskis | Actor | RISK | | SAFE | RISK | SAFE | SAFE | OUT | | | | |
| Panda | Josif Baliukevičius | Actor | | RISK | SAFE | SAFE | SAFE | OUT | | | | | |
| Voras ("Spider") | Karina Krysko | Singer | WIN | | SAFE | SAFE | OUT | | | | | | |
| Monstras ("Monster") | Žydrūnas Savickas | Strongman | RISK | | SAFE | OUT | | | | | | | |
| Debesėlis ("Cloud") | Zilvinas Grigaitis | Businessman | | RISK | OUT | | | | | | | | |
| Robotas ("Robot") | Rolandas Mackevičius | TV Host | | OUT | | | | | | | | | |
| Bananas ("Banana") | Simas Jasaitis | Basketball Player | OUT | | | | | | | | | | |

The masked singer won their face-off and remained in the competition.
The masked singer lost their face-off and was in the bottom three/two, but was not eliminated.
The masked singer was safe from elimination.
The masked singer was eliminated from the competition and unmasked upon their elimination.
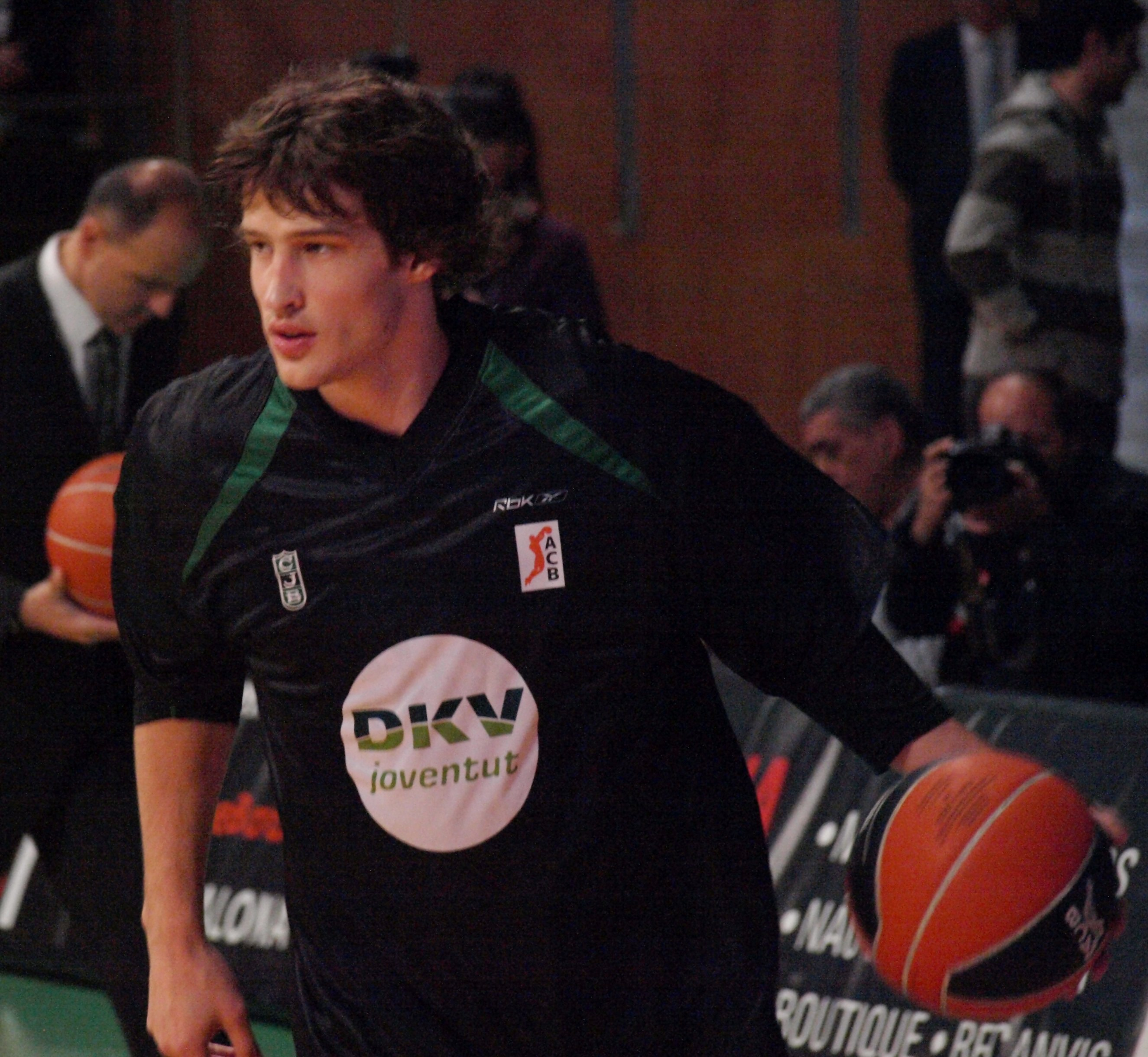
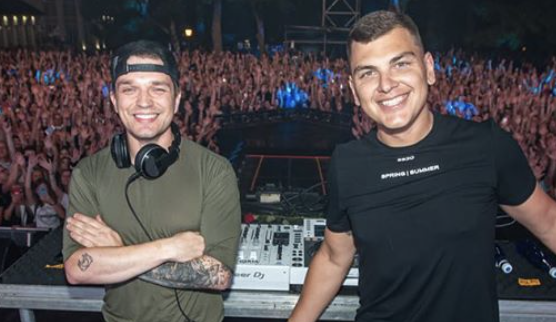
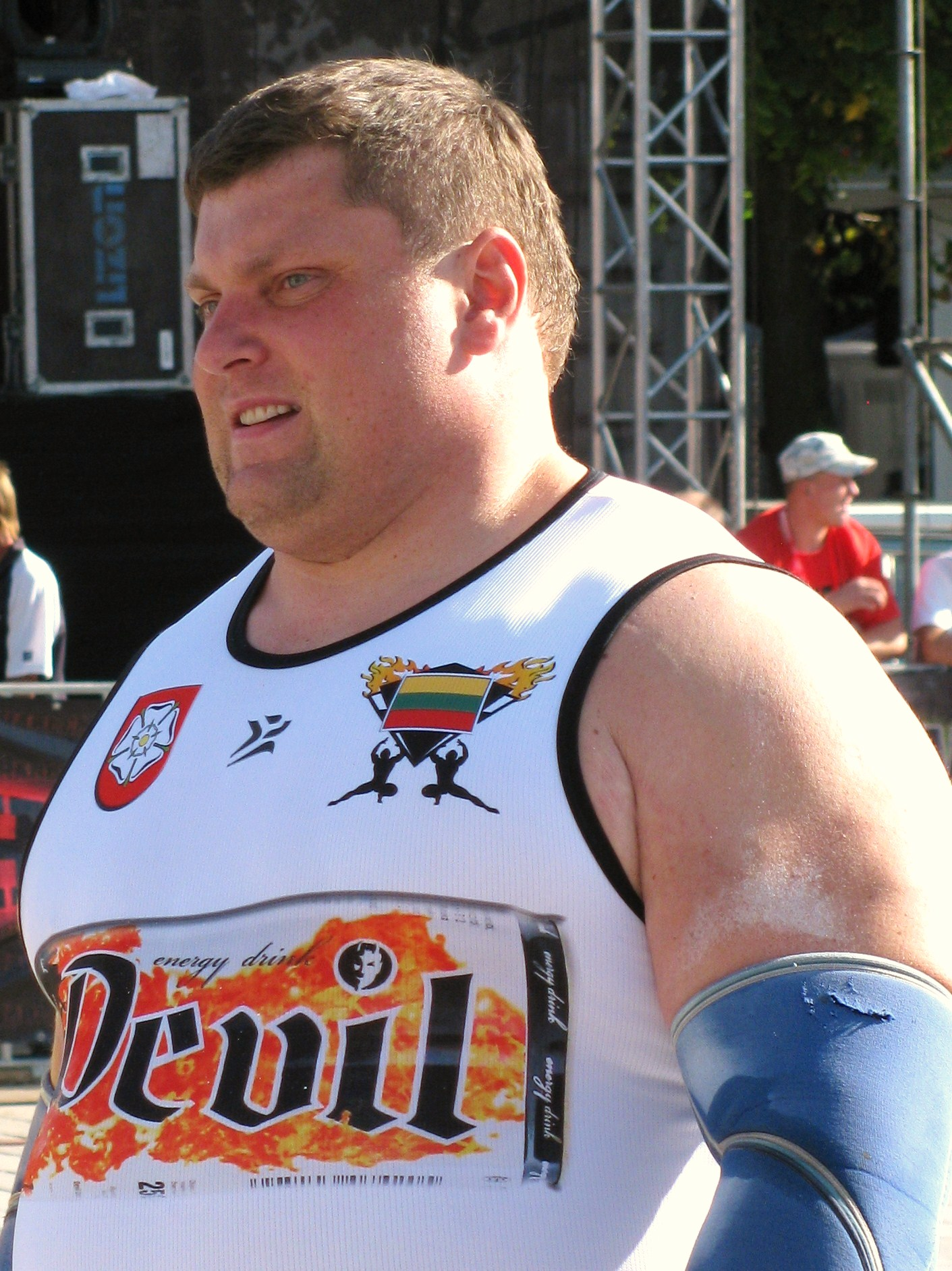
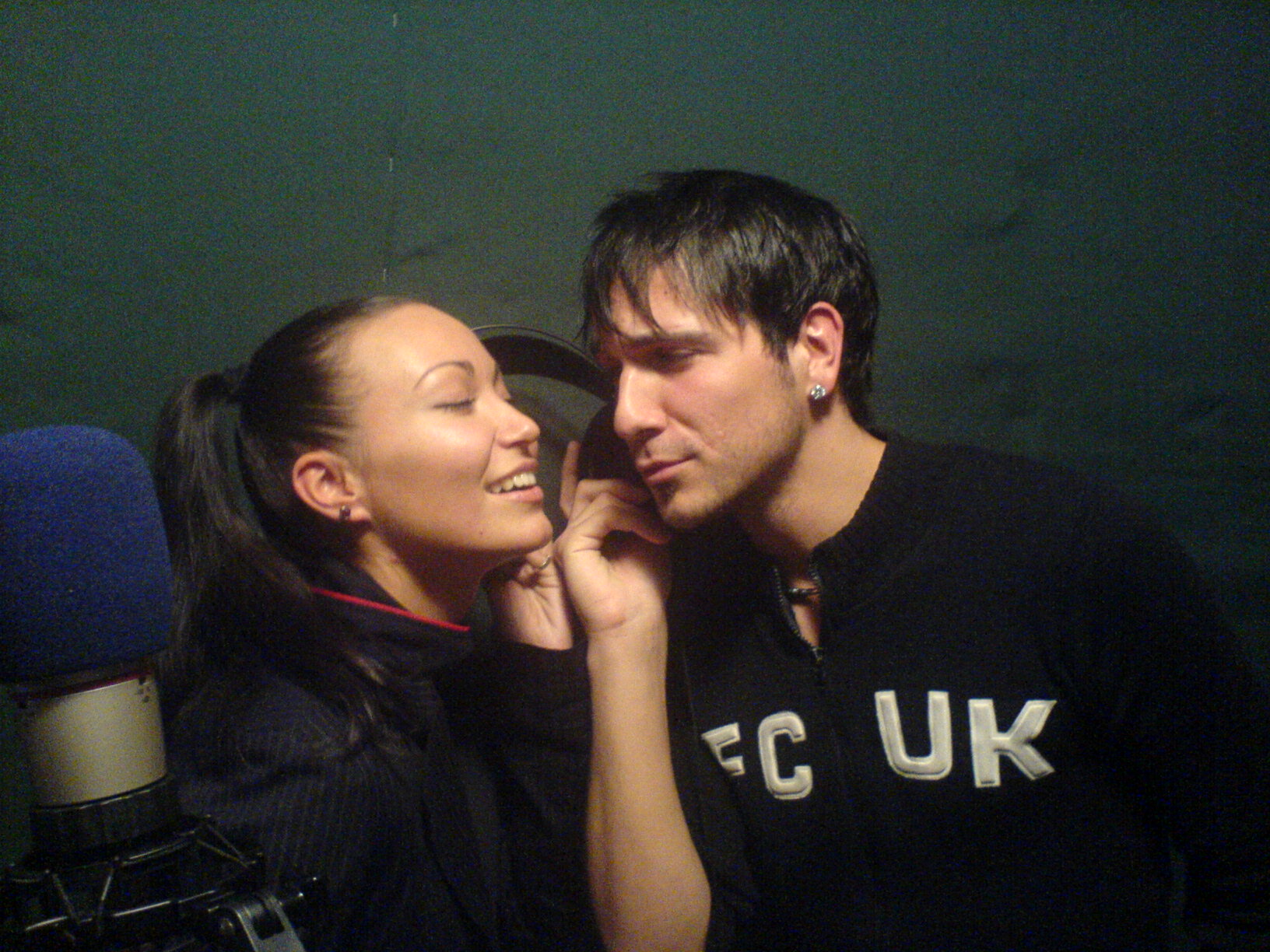
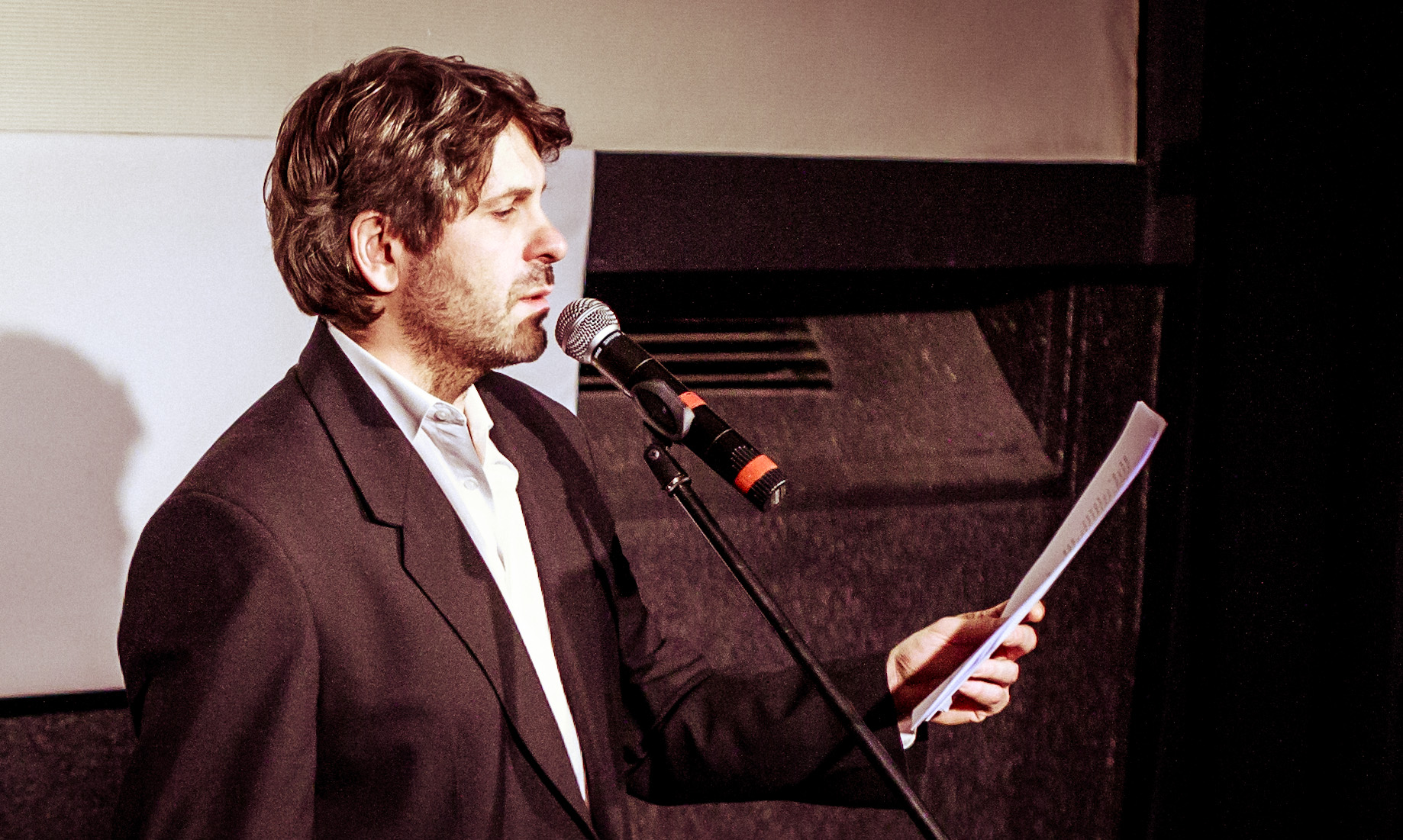
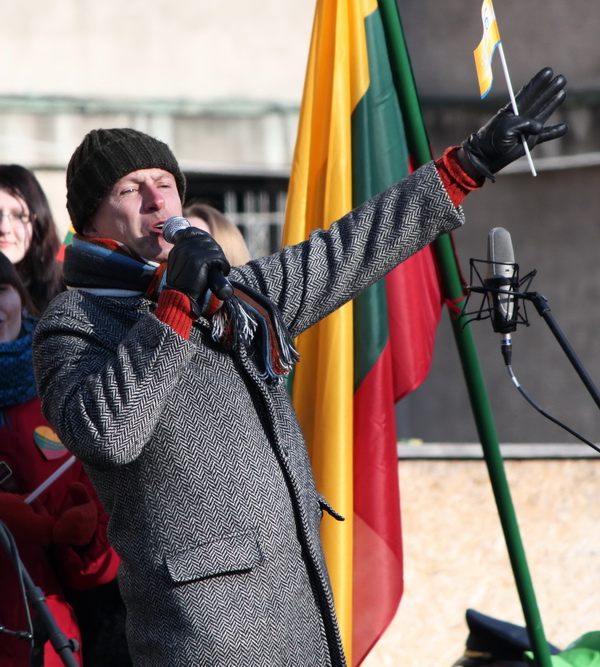
The celebrities who competed in the first season of Kaukės, pictured in order of elimination (l-r):
Simas Jasaitis ("Banana"), Rolandas Mackevičius ("Robot", right), Žydrūnas Savickas ("Monster"), Karina Krysko ("Spider", left), Andrius Bialobzeskis ("Šakotis"), Egidijus Sipavičius ("Lion"),

=== Episodes ===
==== Episode 1 (13 September) ====
Performances on the first episode
| # | Stage name | Song | Identity | Result |
|---|---|---|---|---|
| 1 | Spider | "Don't Stop Me Now" by Queen | undisclosed | WIN |
| 2 | Banana | "39" by Saulius Prūsaitis | Simas Jasaitis | OUT |
| 3 | Lion | "I Feel Love" by Donna Summer | undisclosed | WIN |
| 4 | Spit Cake | "Medžiai Be Lapų" by Poliarizuoti Stiklai | undisclosed | RISK |
| 5 | Monster | "Sirdele Mano" by Vytautas Kernagis | undisclosed | RISK |
| 6 | Fox | "Dance Monkey" by Tones and I | undisclosed | WIN |

==== Episode 2 (19 September) ====
Performances on the second episode
| # | Stage name | Song | Identity | Result |
|---|---|---|---|---|
| 1 | Panda | "Human" by Rag'n'Bone Man | undisclosed | RISK |
| 2 | Ladybug | "Angelas baltas" by Taja | undisclosed | WIN |
| 3 | Cloud | "Flames of Love" by Fancy | undisclosed | RISK |
| 4 | Unicorn | "Po dangum" by Monika Linkytė | undisclosed | WIN |
| 5 | Owl | "I'm Like a Bird" by Nelly Furtado | undisclosed | WIN |
| 6 | Robot | "Pažiūrėk į mane, Mama" by Vidas Bareikis | Rolandas Mackevičius | OUT |

==== Episode 3 (27 September) ====
Performances on the third episode
| # | Stage name | Song | Identity | Result |
|---|---|---|---|---|
| 1 | Lion | "Thunder" by Imagine Dragons | undisclosed | SAFE |
| 2 | Ladybug | "Planai" by Moniqué | undisclosed | SAFE |
| 3 | Spit Cake | "Let's Twist Again" by Chubby Checker | undisclosed | SAFE |
| 4 | Owl | "2mbla" by Pompo | undisclosed | RISK |
| 5 | Panda | "Despacito" by Luis Fonsi feat. Daddy Yankee | undisclosed | SAFE |
| 6 | Cloud | "Labai norėčiau" by Naktinės personos | Zilvinas Grigaitis | OUT |
| 7 | Spider | "Don't Start Now" by Dua Lipa | undisclosed | SAFE |
| 8 | Monster | "Karalių Paslaptys" by Karališka Erdvė | undisclosed | SAFE |
| 9 | Fox | "Let It Go" by Idina Menzel | undisclosed | SAFE |
| 10 | Unicorn | "On Fire" by The Roop | undisclosed | SAFE |

==== Episode 4 (11 October) ====
Performances on the fourth episode
| # | Stage name | Song | Identity | Result |
|---|---|---|---|---|
| 1 | Unicorn | "Blinding Lights" by The Weeknd | undisclosed | SAFE |
| 2 | Owl | "Lūpytės" by Baltasis Kiras | undisclosed | SAFE |
| 3 | Spit Cake | "This Love" by Maroon 5 | undisclosed | RISK |
| 4 | Monster | "Ežero Dugne" by Vidas Bareikis | Žydrūnas Savickas | OUT |
| 5 | Lion | "Every Breath You Take" by The Police | undisclosed | SAFE |
| 6 | Ladybug | "Kelias Pas Tave" by Rebelheart | undisclosed | SAFE |
| 7 | Fox | "Poker Face" by Lady Gaga | undisclosed | RISK |
| 8 | Panda | "Dalis Manęs" by Gabrielius Vagelis | undisclosed | SAFE |
| 9 | Spider | "Just Like Fire" by Pink | undisclosed | SAFE |

==== Episode 5 (18 October) ====
Performances on the fifth episode
| # | Stage name | Song | Identity | Result |
|---|---|---|---|---|
| 1 | Spider | "Pusvalanduko" By Vidas Bareikis | Karina Krysko | OUT |
| 2 | Lion | "Piece of Your Heart" by Meduza feat. Goodboys | undisclosed | SAFE |
| 3 | Ladybug | "Ruduo" by GJan | undisclosed | SAFE |
| 4 | Panda | "Bella ciao" by Goran Bregović | undisclosed | SAFE |
| 5 | Unicorn | "Stayin' Alive" by Bee Gees | undisclosed | SAFE |
| 6 | Fox | "Mažulė" by Antikvariniai Kašpirovskio Dantys | undisclosed | SAFE |
| 7 | Spit Cake | "Liūdna Švente" by Džordana Butkutė | undisclosed | SAFE |
| 8 | Owl | "Me Too" by Meghan Trainor | undisclosed | RISK |

==== Episode 6 (25 October) ====
Performances on the sixth episode
| # | Stage name | Song | Identity | Result |
|---|---|---|---|---|
| 1 | Spit Cake | "Šiandien Tu Man Graži" by Mantas Jankavičius | undisclosed | SAFE |
| 2 | Lion | "Shotgun" by George Ezra | undisclosed | SAFE |
| 3 | Owl | "Laikas" by Gintariniai Laikai | undisclosed | SAFE |
| 4 | Ladybug | "Lovefool" by The Cardigans | undisclosed | SAFE |
| 5 | Fox | "Trys milijonai" by Marijonas Mikutavičius | undisclosed | SAFE |
| 6 | Panda | "Feeling Good" by Michael Bublé | Josif Baliukevičius | OUT |
| 7 | Unicorn | "Chandelier" by Sia | undisclosed | SAFE |

==== Episode 7 (1 November) ====
Performances on the seventh episode
| # | Stage name | Song | Identity | Result |
|---|---|---|---|---|
| 1 | Lion | "Uptown Funk" by Mark Ronson feat. Bruno Mars | undisclosed | RISK |
| 2 | Ladybug | "Mėlyna Mėlyna" by Sisters On Wire | undisclosed | SAFE |
| 3 | Owl | "Po Mano Oda" by Leon Somov & Jazzu | undisclosed | SAFE |
| Wildcard | Hen | "Everybody (Backstreet's Back)" by Backstreet Boys | undisclosed | SAFE |
| 5 | Spit Cake | "I'd Do Anything for Love (But I Won't Do That)" by Meat Loaf feat. Lorraine Crosby | Andrius Bialobzeskis | OUT |
| 6 | Unicorn | "Dviese" by Vaidas Baumila & Monika Pundziūtė-Moniqué | undisclosed | SAFE |
| 7 | Fox | "Diamonds Are a Girl's Best Friend" by Marilyn Monroe | undisclosed | SAFE |

==== Episode 8 (8 November) ====
Performances on the eighth episode
| # | Stage name | Song | Identity | Result |
|---|---|---|---|---|
| 1 | Hay | "Superstar" by Beatrich | Justė Žičkutė | GUEST |
| 2 | Ladybug | "Viskas Bus Gerai" by Donny Montell | undisclosed | SAFE |
| 3 | Unicorn | "Bad Guy" by Billie Eilish | undisclosed | SAFE |
| 4 | Owl | "Laimei" by Hiperbolė | undisclosed | RISK |
| 5 | Fox | "7 Rings" by Ariana Grande | undisclosed | SAFE |
| 6 | Hen | "Taip Jau Gavosi" by Sisters on Wire | undisclosed | SAFE |
| 7 | Lion | "Circle of Life" by Elton John | Egidijus Sipavičius | OUT |

==== Episode 9 (22 November) ====
Performances on the ninth episode
| # | Stage name | Song | Identity | Result |
|---|---|---|---|---|
| 1 | Deer | "Miškų dukra" by Egidijus Sipavičius | Leonardas Pobedonoscevas | GUEST |
| 2 | Owl | "Love Runs Out" by OneRepublic | Toma Vaškevičiūtė | OUT |
| 3 | Fox | "Love Me like You Do" by Ellie Goulding | undisclosed | SAFE |
| 4 | Hen | "Giant" by Calvin Harris and Rag'n'Bone Man | undisclosed | SAFE |
| 5 | Flower | "Nenoriu Grįžt Namo" by Moniqué | Tatjana Lavrinovič | GUEST |
| 6 | Ladybug | "Kažkas atsitiko" by Antis | undisclosed | SAFE |
| 7 | Unicorn | "Believer" by Imagine Dragons | undisclosed | RISK |

==== Episode 10 – Semi-final (29 November) ====
- Group performance: "A Little Party Never Killed Nobody (All We Got)" by Fergie, Q-Tip, and GoonRock

Performances on the tenth episode
| # | Stage name | Song | Identity | Result |
|---|---|---|---|---|
| 1 | Hen | "Sportas" by SKAMP | WIN | |
| 2 | Fox | "Shake It Off" by Taylor Swift | RISK | |
| 3 | Ladybug | "Kol myliu" by Ieva Zasimauskaitė | WIN | |
| 4 | Unicorn | "Più bella cosa" by Eros Ramazzotti | RISK | |
| Face-off details | | | Identity | Result |
| 5 | Fox | "Single Ladies (Put a Ring on It)" by Beyoncé | Inga Stumbrienė | OUT |
| 6 | Unicorn | "Uzrakinta Surakinta" by Mokinukės | undisclosed | SAFE |

==== Episode 11 – Finale (6 December) ====
Performances on the eleventh episode
| # | Stage name | Song | Identity | Result |
|---|---|---|---|---|
| 1 | Deer, Hay and Flower | "I Gotta Feeling" by Black Eyed Peas | Edgaras Lubys, Ironvytas, & Samanta Tīna | GUESTS |
| 2 | Ladybug | "Kalėdų Eglutė" by Kardiofonas | undisclosed | SAFE |
| 3 | Hen | "Ghostbusters" by Ray Parker Jr. | Simonas Storpirštis | THIRD |
| 4 | Unicorn | "Billie Jean" by Michael Jackson | undisclosed | SAFE |
| Face-off details | | | Identity | Result |
| 5 | Ladybug | "Soldi" by Mahmood | Ilona Balsytė | RUNNER-UP |
| 6 | Unicorn | "Girls Just Want to Have Fun" by Cyndi Lauper | Rūta Ščiogolevaitė | WINNER |

== Season 2 (2021) ==
| Stage name | Celebrity | Notability | Episodes | | | | | | | | | | |
| Stage name | Celebrity | Notability | 1 | 2 | 3 | 4 | 5 | 6 | 7 | 8 | 9 | 10 | 11 |
|---|---|---|---|---|---|---|---|---|---|---|---|---|---|
| Avinas ("Ram") | Martynas Kavaliauskas | Singer | | WIN | SAFE | SAFE | SAFE | SAFE | SAFE | SAFE | RISK | WIN | WINNER |
| Superherojus ("Superhero") | Deivydas Zvonkus | Songwriter | | RISK | SAFE | SAFE | RISK | SAFE | SAFE | SAFE | SAFE | RISK | RUNNER-UP |
| Mėnulis ("Moon") (WC) | Ieva Zasimauskaitė | Singer | | | | | | | SAFE | SAFE | SAFE | WIN | THIRD |
| Ąžuolas ("Oak") | Edmundas Kučinskas | Singer | WIN | | SAFE | SAFE | SAFE | SAFE | SAFE | RISK | SAFE | OUT | |
| Drugelis ("Butterfly") | Daina Bosas | Businesswoman | RISK | | SAFE | SAFE | SAFE | RISK | SAFE | SAFE | OUT | | |
| Varlė ("Frog") | Deividas Meškauskas | Dancer | | WIN | SAFE | SAFE | SAFE | SAFE | RISK | OUT | | | |
| Šuo ("Dog") | Tadas Gryn | Actor | WIN | | SAFE | SAFE | SAFE | SAFE | OUT | | | | |
| Zuikutė ("Bunny") | Katažina Zvonkuvienė | Singer | RISK | | RISK | RISK | SAFE | OUT | | | | | |
| Raudonviršis ("Red Mushroom") | Virginijus Šeškus | Basketball Coach | WIN | | SAFE | RISK | OUT | | | | | | |
| Baubukė ("Miss Monster") | Inga Norkute | Actress | | RISK | SAFE | OUT | | | | | | | |
| Lūpos ("Lips") | Oksana Pikul-Jasaitiene | Makeup guru | | WIN | OUT | | | | | | | | |
| Ananasas ("Pineapple") | Jonas Sakalauskas | Director | | OUT | | | | | | | | | |
| Pantera ("Panther") | Rūta Mikelkevičiūtė | TV Presenter | OUT | | | | | | | | | | |

The masked singer won their face-off and remained in the competition.
The masked singer lost their face-off and was in the bottom three/two, but was not eliminated.
The masked singer was safe from elimination.
The masked singer was eliminated from the competition and unmasked upon their elimination.

=== Episodes ===
==== Episode 1 (12 September) ====
Performances on the first episode
| # | Stage name | Song | Identity | Result |
|---|---|---|---|---|
| 1 | Dog | "I Wanna Be Your Slave" by Måneskin | undisclosed | WIN |
| 2 | Panther | "Vėjas man pasakė" by Danutė Neimontaitė | undisclosed | RISK |
| 3 | Oak | "Night Fever" by Bee Gees | undisclosed | WIN |
| 4 | Butterfly | "Mylėt Tave Taip Beprotiška Ir Keista" by Lemon Joy | undisclosed | RISK |
| 5 | Bunny | "Agadoo" by Black Lace | undisclosed | RISK |
| 6 | Red Mushroom | "Vasara 3016" by Saulius Prusaitis | undisclosed | WIN |
| Sing-off details | | | Identity | Result |
| 1 | Panther | "Žemyn" by Delfinai | Rūta Mikelkevičiūtė | OUT |
| 2 | Bunny | "Vamos a la Playa" by Righeira | undisclosed | SAFE |

==== Episode 2 (19 September) ====
Performances on the second episode
| # | Stage name | Song | Identity | Result |
|---|---|---|---|---|
| 1 | Lips | "Nes Aš Tik Vėjas" by SEL | undisclosed | WIN |
| 2 | Superhero | "Hero" by Enrique Iglesias | undisclosed | RISK |
| 3 | Ram | "Shum" by Go_A | undisclosed | WIN |
| 4 | Miss Monster | "Lietaus Lašai" by FUNKY | undisclosed | RISK |
| 5 | Frog | "Friday" by Riton, Nightcrawlers feat. Mufasa, Hypeman | undisclosed | WIN |
| 6 | Pineapple | "Kitoks Pasaulis" by Andrius Mamontovas | undisclosed | RISK |
| Sing-off details | | | Identity | Result |
| 1 | Pineapple | "Enjoy the Silence" by Depeche Mode | Jonas Sakalauskas | OUT |
| 2 | Superhero | "Rudeninis Paukštis" by Romas Dambrauskas | undisclosed | SAFE |

==== Episode 3 (26 September) ====
Performances on the third episode
| # | Stage name | Song | Identity | Result |
|---|---|---|---|---|
| 1 | Ram | "You're Beautiful" by James Blunt | undisclosed | SAFE |
| 2 | Oak | "Rasputin" by Boney M. | undisclosed | SAFE |
| 3 | Bunny | "Miško pasaka" by Išjunk šviesą | undisclosed | RISK |
| 4 | Dog | "The Business" by Tiësto | undisclosed | SAFE |
| 5 | Superhero | "It's a Sin" by Pet Shop Boys | undisclosed | SAFE |
| 7 | Butterfly | "Laukų Gėlė" by Rondo | undisclosed | SAFE |
| 6 | Lips | "Who's Laughing Now" by Ava Max | Oksana Pikul-Jasaitiene | OUT |
| 8 | Miss Monster | "Ég veleg" by Heni Dér | undisclosed | SAFE |
| 9 | Red Mushroom | "Man Gerai" by ŽAS | undisclosed | SAFE |
| 10 | Frog | "Alyvos" by ANTIS | undisclosed | SAFE |

==== Episode 4 (3 October) ====
Performances on the fourth episode
| # | Stage name | Song | Identity | Result |
|---|---|---|---|---|
| 1 | Bunny | "Mamma Maria" by Ricchi e Poveri | undisclosed | RISK |
| 2 | Butterfly | "O Mažyti" by Džordana Butkutė | undisclosed | SAFE |
| 3 | Frog | "Personal Jesus" by Depeche Mode | undisclosed | SAFE |
| 4 | Miss Monster | "Vaikinai Trumpais Šortais" by Monika Liu | Inga Norkute | OUT |
| 5 | Dog | "Kunigunda" by Vaidas Baumila | undisclosed | SAFE |
| 6 | Oak | "Savage Love" by Jason Derulo and Jawsh 685 | undisclosed | SAFE |
| 7 | Red Mushroom | "Eins Zwei Polizei" by Mo-Do | undisclosed | RISK |
| 8 | Superhero | "L'Été indien" by Joe Dassin | undisclosed | SAFE |
| 9 | Ram | "Let It Be" by The Beatles | undisclosed | SAFE |

==== Episode 5 (10 October) ====
Performances on the fifth episode
| # | Stage name | Song | Identity | Result |
|---|---|---|---|---|
| 1 | Dog | "Save Your Tears" by The Weeknd & Ariana Grande | undisclosed | SAFE |
| 2 | Ram | "Meilės Netylėk" by Aistė Pilvelytė & Vaida Genytė | undisclosed | SAFE |
| 3 | Frog | "Vakar Vakare" by Kastaneda | undisclosed | SAFE |
| 4 | Red Mushroom | "Aš Nupirksiu Tau Namą" by Requiem | Virginijus Šeškus | OUT |
| 5 | Bunny | "Heart Of Glass" by Blondie | undisclosed | SAFE |
| 6 | Oak | "Physical" by Dua Lipa | undisclosed | SAFE |
| 7 | Superhero | "Ave Maria" by Franz Schubert | undisclosed | RISK |
| 8 | Butterfly | "Ant Slenksčio" by VAIRAS | undisclosed | SAFE |

==== Episode 6 (17 October) ====
Performances on the sixth episode
| # | Stage name | Song | Identity | Result |
|---|---|---|---|---|
| 1 | Bunny | "Aš Nepamesiu Savo Dainos" by Vidas Bareikis | Katažina Zvonkuvienė | OUT |
| 2 | Dog | "Lonely" by Justin Bieber & Benny Blanco | undisclosed | SAFE |
| 3 | Ram | "Sex Bomb" by Tom Jones & Mousse T. | undisclosed | SAFE |
| 4 | Oak | "Funiculì Funiculà" by Luciano Pavarotti | undisclosed | SAFE |
| 5 | Frog | "Ūdra" by Sportas | undisclosed | SAFE |
| 6 | Butterfly | "Dėl Tavęs Galiu" by Kastytis Kerbedis | undisclosed | RISK |
| 7 | Superhero | "Light My Fire" by The Doors | undisclosed | SAFE |

==== Episode 7 (24 October) ====
Performances on the seventh episode
| # | Stage name | Song | Identity | Result |
|---|---|---|---|---|
| Wildcard | Moon | "Hallelujah" by Jeff Buckley | undisclosed | SAFE |
| 2 | Superhero | "Optimistas" by Vaidotas Valiukevičius | undisclosed | SAFE |
| 3 | Dog | "Ieškau" by 8 Kambarys, feat. Niko Barisas | Tadas Gryn | OUT |
| 4 | Butterfly | "Flying" by Nice Little Penguins | undisclosed | SAFE |
| 5 | Oak | "Black or White" by Michael Jackson | undisclosed | SAFE |
| 6 | Frog | "The World Is Mine" by David Guetta | undisclosed | RISK |
| 7 | Ram | "Išdalinau" by Ovidijus Vyšniauskas | undisclosed | SAFE |

==== Episode 8 (31 October) ====
Performances on the eighth episode
| # | Stage name | Song | Identity | Result |
|---|---|---|---|---|
| 1 | Egg | "Sąnariai" by Tomas Augulis | Nerijus Juška | GUEST |
| 2 | Superhero | "With Or Without You" by U2 | undisclosed | SAFE |
| 3 | Butterfly | "Mėlyna Mėlyna" by Sisters On Wire | undisclosed | SAFE |
| 4 | Oak | "Baltaragio arija" by Vyacheslav Ganelin | undisclosed | RISK |
| 5 | Ram | "Baila Me" by Gipsy Kings | undisclosed | SAFE |
| 6 | Moon | "I Have Nothing" by Whitney Houston | undisclosed | SAFE |
| 7 | Frog | "Rampampam" by Minelli | Deividas Meškauskas | OUT |

==== Episode 9 (7 November) ====
Performances on the ninth episode
| # | Stage name | Song | Identity | Result |
|---|---|---|---|---|
| 1 | Penguin | "Myliu" by Vaidas Baumila | Danas Rapšys | GUEST |
| 2 | Moon | "Discoteque" by The Roop | undisclosed | SAFE |
| 3 | Butterfly | "Aš Žiūriu Į Tave, Pasauli" by SEL | Daina Bosas | OUT |
| 4 | Ice Cream | "Nebenoriu laukt ilgai" by Džordana Butkutė | Karolina Meschino | GUEST |
| 5 | Superhero | "Take On Me" by A-ha | undisclosed | SAFE |
| 6 | Ram | "No Time to Die" by Billie Eilish | undisclosed | RISK |
| 7 | Oak | "'O surdato 'nnammurato" by Enrico Cannio | undisclosed | SAFE |

==== Episode 10 Semi-Final (14 November) ====
- Group performance: "High Hopes" by Panic! at the Disco

Performances on the tenth episode
| # | Stage name | Song | Result | |
|---|---|---|---|---|
| 1 | Ram | "Kol Vakaras Ilgas" by Donatas Montvydas | WIN | |
| 2 | Oak | "Zitti e buoni" by Måneskin | RISK | |
| 3 | Superhero | "Old Town Road" by Lil Nas X & Billy Ray Cyrus | RISK | |
| 4 | Moon | "Valerie" by Amy Winehouse | WIN | |
| Sing-off details | | | Identity | Result |
| 1 | Oak | "Dynamite" by BTS | Edmundas Kučinskas | OUT |
| 2 | Superhero | "Malda" by Georges Bizet | undisclosed | SAFE |

==== Episode 11 – Finale (21 November) ====
Performances on the eleventh episode
| # | Stage name | Song | Identity | Result |
|---|---|---|---|---|
| 1 | Superhero | "Heroes" by Måns Zelmerlöw | undisclosed | SAFE |
| 2 | Ram | "Non, Je Ne Regrette Rien" by Edith Piaf | undisclosed | SAFE |
| 3 | Moon | "Išgalvotas Gyvenimas" by Hiperbolė | Ieva Zasimauskaitė | THIRD |
| Face-off details | | | Identity | Result |
| 4 | Superhero | "I'm Too Sexy" by Right Said Fred | Deivydas Zvonkus | RUNNER-UP |
| 5 | Ram | "Skin" by Rag n Bone Man | Martynas Kavaliauskas | WINNER |

== Season 3 (2022) ==
| Stage name | Celebrity | Notability | Episodes | | | | | | | | | | | | | |
| Stage name | Celebrity | Notability | 1 | 2 | 3 | 4 | 5 | 6 | 7 | 8 | 9 | 10 | 11 | 12 | 13 | 14 |
|---|---|---|---|---|---|---|---|---|---|---|---|---|---|---|---|---|
| Burokėlis ("Beetroot") | Stano | Singer | | RISK | RISK | SAFE | SAFE | SAFE | SAFE | RISK | RISK | SAFE | SAFE | RISK | RISK | WINNER |
| Lėlė ("Doll") | Augustė Vedrickaitė | Singer | | WIN | SAFE | SAFE | SAFE | SAFE | SAFE | SAFE | SAFE | SAFE | SAFE | SAFE | WIN | RUNNER-UP |
| Slibinas ("Hydra") | Naglis Bierancas | Influencer | WIN | | SAFE | RISK | RISK | SAFE | SAFE | SAFE | SAFE | SAFE | SAFE | SAFE | WIN | THIRD |
| Žiurkėnas ("Hamster") (WC) | Dominykas Vaitiekūnas | Actor | | | | | | | | | SAFE | SAFE | SAFE | SAFE | OUT | |
| Žuvis ("Fish") | Jeronimas Milius | Singer | WIN | | SAFE | SAFE | SAFE | RISK | RISK | SAFE | SAFE | RISK | RISK | OUT | | |
| TV Bokštas ("TV Tower") (WC) | Juozas Petkevičius | Basketball coach | | | | | | | | | | SAFE | OUT | | | |
| Saulė ("Sun") (WC) | Ruslana | Singer | | | | | | | | SAFE | SAFE | OUT | | | | |
| Kaktusas ("Cactus") | Livija Gradauskienė | Radio host | RISK | | SAFE | SAFE | SAFE | SAFE | SAFE | SAFE | OUT | | | | | |
| Kunigaikštis ("Duke") | Vytautas Lukočius | Conductor | | WIN | | SAFE | SAFE | SAFE | SAFE | OUT | | | | | | |
| Papūga ("Parrot") (WC) | Vaidas Čeponis | Journalist | | | | | | SAFE | OUT | | | | | | | |
| Kirmėlė ("Caterpillar") | Natalija Bunkė | Singer | WIN | | | SAFE | SAFE | OUT | | | | | | | | |
| Kamanė ("Bumblebee") | Kristina Kaikarienė | Businesswoman | | WIN | SAFE | SAFE | OUT | | | | | | | | | |
| Pipiras ("Pepper") | Lina Rastokaitė | Actress | RISK | | SAFE | OUT | | | | | | | | | | |
| Sietynas ("Chandelier") | Katerina Voropaj | Dancer | | RISK | OUT | | | | | | | | | | | |
| Begemotas ("Hippo") | Vytenis Pauliukaitis | TV host | | OUT | | | | | | | | | | | | |
| Bulvės ("Fries") | Ramūnas Vyšniauskas | Weightlifter | OUT | | | | | | | | | | | | | |

The masked singer won their face-off and remained in the competition.
The masked singer lost their face-off and was in the bottom three/two, but was not eliminated.
The masked singer was safe from elimination.
The masked singer was eliminated from the competition and unmasked upon their elimination.

=== Episodes ===
==== Episode 1 (11 September) ====
Performances on the first episode
| # | Stage name | Song | Result | |
|---|---|---|---|---|
| 1 | Hydra | "Toxic" by Britney Spears | WIN | |
| 2 | Cactus | "T.N.T." by AC/DC | RISK | |
| 3 | Fish | "Sentimentai" by Monika Liu | WIN | |
| 4 | Pepper | "So What" by P!nk | RISK | |
| 5 | Fries | "Bla Bla Bla" by Gigi D'Agostino | RISK | |
| 6 | Caterpillar | "Kevinas Durantas" by OG Version | WIN | |
| Sing-off details | | | Identity | Result |
| 1 | Pepper | "Nessun dorma" by Giacomo Puccini | undisclosed | SAFE |
| 2 | Fries | "Kolorado vabalai" by Vytautas Kernagis | Ramūnas Vyšniauskas | OUT |

==== Episode 2 (18 September) ====
Performances on the second episode
| # | Stage name | Song | Result | |
|---|---|---|---|---|
| 1 | Duke | "Ar mylit ją jūs" by Marijonas Mikutavičius | WIN | |
| 2 | Hippo | "Prie ežerėlio" by Saulis Prusaitis | RISK | |
| 3 | Doll | "Boss Bitch" by Doja Cat | WIN | |
| 4 | Chandelier | "Šviesos greičiu" by ZYGGA | RISK | |
| 5 | Bumblebee | "Quando, Quando, Quando" by Engelbert Humperdinck | WIN | |
| 6 | Beetroot | "Hard Rock Hallelujah" by Lordi | RISK | |
| Sing-off details | | | Identity | Result |
| 1 | Hippo | "Gloria" by Umberto Tozzi | Vytenis Pauliukaitis | OUT |
| 2 | Beetroot | "Lyriškas gangsteris" by Kipišas | undisclosed | SAFE |

==== Episode 3 (25 September) ====
Performances on the third episode
| # | Stage name | Song | Identity | Result |
|---|---|---|---|---|
| 1 | Pepper | "SUPERMODEL" by Måneskin | undisclosed | SAFE |
| 2 | Fish | "How Much Is the Fish?" by Scooter | undisclosed | SAFE |
| 3 | Doll | "Paskambink man (jei tau liūdna)" by Saulės Kliošas | undisclosed | SAFE |
| 4 | Chandelier | "Womanizer" by Britney Spears | Katerina Voropaj | OUT |
| 5 | Beetroot | "Santechnikas iš Ukmergės" by Žas | undisclosed | RISK |
| 6 | Cactus | "City Lights" by Blanche | undisclosed | SAFE |
| 7 | Bumblebee | "Išvažiuosiu prie jūros" by Džordana Butkutė | undisclosed | SAFE |
| 8 | Hydra | "Green Green Grass" by George Ezra | undisclosed | SAFE |

==== Episode 4 (2 October) ====
Performances on the fourth episode
| # | Stage name | Song | Identity | Result |
|---|---|---|---|---|
| 1 | Beetroot | "Ой у лузі червона калина" by Stepan Charnetskyi | undisclosed | SAFE |
| 2 | Duke | "I Was Made for Lovin' You" by Kiss | undisclosed | SAFE |
| 3 | Doll | "Everything I Wanted" by Billie Eilish | undisclosed | SAFE |
| 4 | Fish | "Ryt iš ryto" by Radži | undisclosed | SAFE |
| 5 | Pepper | "Panelė iš Kauno rajono" by Natalija Bunkė | Lina Rastokaitė | OUT |
| 6 | Cactus | "I Will Survive" by Gloria Gaynor | undisclosed | SAFE |
| 7 | Hydra | "Vandens ženklai" by Hiperbolė | undisclosed | RISK |
| 8 | Bumblebee | "Mambo Italiano" by Bette Midler | undisclosed | SAFE |
| 9 | Caterpillar | "Ačiū, kad šalia esi" by Merūnas Vitulskis and Asmik Gregorian | undisclosed | SAFE |

==== Episode 5 (9 October) ====
Performances on the fifth episode
| # | Stage name | Song | Identity | Result |
|---|---|---|---|---|
| 1 | Doll | "Bailando" by Paradisio | undisclosed | SAFE |
| 2 | Hydra | "Tainted Love" by Soft Cell | undisclosed | RISK |
| 3 | Beetroot | "Vivo per lei" by Mino | undisclosed | SAFE |
| 4 | Duke | "On Fire" by The Roop | undisclosed | SAFE |
| 5 | Caterpillar | "Policija" by Sportas | undisclosed | SAFE |
| 6 | Fish | "Jožin z bažin" by Ivan Mládek | undisclosed | SAFE |
| 7 | Bumblebee | "Šokių Aikštelėje" by Leon Somov & Saulės Kliošas | Kristina Kaikarienė | OUT |
| 8 | Cactus | "Medžiai melagiai" by Velvet | undisclosed | SAFE |

==== Episode 6 (16 October) ====
Performances on the sixth episode
| # | Stage name | Song | Identity | Result |
|---|---|---|---|---|
| 1 | Fish | "Rugpjūtis" by Justinas Jarutis & Jessica Shy | undisclosed | RISK |
| 2 | Cactus | "Love of My Life" by Queen | undisclosed | SAFE |
| 3 | Doll | "Gera" by EMPTY | undisclosed | SAFE |
| Wildcard | Parrot | "Vagis" by BIX | undisclosed | SAFE |
| 4 | Beetroot | "Scatman (Ski-Ba-Bop-Ba-Dop-Bop)" by Scatman John | undisclosed | SAFE |
| 5 | Caterpillar | "Į klubą" by Raketa | Natalija Bunkė | OUT |
| 6 | Duke | "Zombiai" by ANTIS | undisclosed | SAFE |
| 7 | Hydra | "Senieji Vilniaus stogai" by Egidijus Sipavičius | undisclosed | SAFE |

==== Episode 7 (23 October) ====
Performances on the seventh episode
| # | Stage name | Song | Identity | Result |
|---|---|---|---|---|
| 1 | Beetroot | "Pažiūrėk į mane, Mama" by Vidas Bareikis | undisclosed | SAFE |
| 2 | Doll | "My Heart Goes (La Di Da)" by Becky Hill & Topic | undisclosed | SAFE |
| 3 | Parrot | "Norėjau skristi" by ŽAS | Vaidas Čeponis | OUT |
| 4 | Hydra | "Montero (Call Me by Your Name)" by Lil Nas X | undisclosed | SAFE |
| 5 | Cactus | "Troškimas" by Monika Liu | undisclosed | SAFE |
| 6 | Duke | "Where Are You Now" by Lost Frequencies & Calum Scott | undisclosed | SAFE |
| 7 | Fish | "Ūdrio daina" by Vytautas Klova | undisclosed | RISK |

==== Episode 8 (30 October) ====
Performances on the eighth episode
| # | Stage name | Song | Identity | Result |
|---|---|---|---|---|
| 1 | Duke | "Clap Your Hands" by Kungs | Vytautas Lukočius | OUT |
| 2 | Doll | "Natural" by Imagine Dragons | undisclosed | SAFE |
| 3 | Fish | "Noriu lėkt" by B'Avarija | undisclosed | SAFE |
| Wildcard | Sun | "Earth Song" by Michael Jackson | undisclosed | SAFE |
| 4 | Hydra | "Beggin'" by Måneskin | undisclosed | SAFE |
| 5 | Cactus | "Twist in My Sobriety" by Tanita Tikaram | undisclosed | SAFE |
| 6 | Beetroot | "Jūreivio daina" by Andrius Mamontovas | undisclosed | RISK |

==== Episode 9 (6 November) ====
Performances on the ninth episode
| # | Stage name | Song | Identity | Result |
|---|---|---|---|---|
| 1 | Hydra | "Mangai" by Antikvariniai Kašpirovskio Dantys | undisclosed | SAFE |
| 2 | Beetroot | "Return to Innocence" by Enigma | undisclosed | RISK |
| 3 | Fish | "Lūpytės" by Baltasis Kiras | undisclosed | SAFE |
| Wildcard | Hamster | "Bad Romance" by Lady Gaga | undisclosed | SAFE |
| 4 | Cactus | "Video Games" by Lana Del Rey | Livija Gradauskienė | OUT |
| 5 | Doll | "Šokam Lėtai" by Jessica Shy | undisclosed | SAFE |
| 6 | Sun | "In The Army Now" by Status Quo | undisclosed | SAFE |

==== Episode 10 (13 November) ====
Performances on the tenth episode
| # | Stage name | Song | Identity | Result |
|---|---|---|---|---|
| 1 | Sun | "Teka, teka šviesi saulė" | Ruslana | OUT |
| 2 | Hydra | "Sway" by Michael Bublé | undisclosed | SAFE |
| 3 | Hamster | "Space Man" by Sam Ryder | undisclosed | SAFE |
| Wildcard | TV Tower | "Pokštas" by ANTIS | undisclosed | SAFE |
| 4 | Fish | "Baby, I Love Your Way" by Peter Frampton | undisclosed | RISK |
| 5 | Doll | "Shape of You" by Ed Sheeran | undisclosed | SAFE |
| 6 | Beetroot | "Walking in My Shoes" by Depeche Mode | undisclosed | SAFE |

==== Episode 11 (20 November) ====
Performances on the eleventh episode
| # | Stage name | Song | Identity | Result |
|---|---|---|---|---|
| 1 | Cone | "Dragostea Din Tei" by O-Zone and W&W | Rokas Bernatonis | GUEST |
| 2 | Doll | "Ain't Nobody" by Rufus & Chaka Khan | undisclosed | SAFE |
| 3 | Fish | "Mano didžiausia žuvis" by Marijonas Mikutavičius | undisclosed | RISK |
| 4 | Hamster | "Easy on Me" by Adele | undisclosed | SAFE |
| 5 | TV Tower | "Tu Palauk Sustok" by Rondo & Božolė Choras | Juozas Petkevičius | OUT |
| 6 | Beetroot | "As It Was" By Harry Styles | undisclosed | SAFE |
| 7 | Hydra | "Can't Help Falling in Love" by Elvis Presley | undisclosed | SAFE |

==== Episode 12 (27 November) ====
Performances on the twelfth episode
| # | Stage name | Song | Identity | Result |
|---|---|---|---|---|
| 1 | Duck | "The Motto" by Tiësto & Ava Max | Simona Nainė | GUEST |
| 2 | Hamster | "It's Oh So Quiet" by Betty Hutton | undisclosed | SAFE |
| 3 | Hydra | "Crazy" by Gnarls Barkley | undisclosed | SAFE |
| 4 | Fish | "Gyvenu" by 69 Danguje | Jeronimas Milius | OUT |
| 5 | Fireworks | "Mona Liza" by Vidas Bareikis | Indrė Stonkuvienė | GUEST |
| 6 | Doll | "Leidžiu sau viską" by GJan | undisclosed | SAFE |
| 7 | Beetroot | "Shut Up (and Sleep with Me)" by Sin With Sebastian | undisclosed | RISK |

==== Episode 13 – Semi-final (4 December) ====
- Group performance: "Dschinghis Khan m" by Vee Sing Zone

Performances on the thirteenth episode
| # | Stage name | Song | Identity | Result |
|---|---|---|---|---|
| 1 | Doll | "Say So" by Doja Cat | WIN | |
| 2 | Beetroot | "Barbie Girl" by Aqua | RISK | |
| 3 | Hydra | "Kupranugaris" by Vidas Bareikis | WIN | |
| 4 | Hamster | "In da Getto" by J Balvin & Skrillex | RISK | |
| Face-off details | | | Identity | Result |
| 1 | Beetroot | "Rudens naktis sustojo" by JAZZU | undisclosed | SAFE |
| 2 | Hamster | "Lietuvaitė" by Danielius Dolskis | Dominykas Vaitiekūnas | OUT |

==== Episode 14 – Finale (11 December) ====
Performances on the fourteenth episode
| # | Stage name | Song | Identity | Result |
|---|---|---|---|---|
| 1 | Hydra | "Umbrella" by Rihanna | Naglis Bierancas | THIRD |
| 1 | Hydra | "Wellerman" by Nathan Evans | Naglis Bierancas | THIRD |
| 2 | Doll | "Higher Power" by Coldplay | Augustė Vedrickaitė | RUNNER-UP |
| 2 | Doll | "Lucky" by Britney Spears | Augustė Vedrickaitė | RUNNER-UP |
| 3 | Beetroot | "Svajonės" by Stano | Stano | WINNER |
| 3 | Beetroot | "Zombie" by The Cranberries | Stano | WINNER |

== Season 4 (2023) ==
| Stage name | Celebrity | Notability | Episodes | | | | | | | | | | | | | |
| Stage name | Celebrity | Notability | 1 | 2 | 3 | 4 | 5 | 6 | 7 | 8 | 9 | 10 | 11 | 12 | 13 | 14 |
|---|---|---|---|---|---|---|---|---|---|---|---|---|---|---|---|---|
| Juodvarnis ("Raven") | Dainius Kazlauskas | Actor | | WIN | IMM (Note: Raven and Bull gained immunity for the third episode due to the contestants being the best of their first episode.) | SAFE | SAFE | SAFE | SAFE | SAFE | SAFE | SAFE | RISK | SAFE | WIN | WINNER |
| Ateivė ("Alien") | Ugnė Siparė | Presenter | WIN | | SAFE | RISK | SAFE | SAFE | SAFE | SAFE | RISK | SAFE | SAFE | SAFE | WIN | RUNNER-UP |
| Ežiukas ("Hedgehog") (WC) | Anyanya Udongwo | Singer | | | | | | SAFE | SAFE | SAFE | SAFE | SAFE | SAFE | RISK | RISK | THIRD |
| Eglutė ("Christmas Tree") (WC) | Sandra Žutautienė | Journalist | | | | | | | | | | SAFE | SAFE | SAFE | OUT | |
| Brokolis ("Broccoli") (WC) | Jonas Nainys | DJ | | | | | | | | | SAFE | SAFE | SAFE | OUT | | |
| Jautis ("Bull") | Laurynas Suodatis (Siegel vyras) | Businessman | WIN | | IMM (Note: Raven and Bull gained immunity for the third episode due to the contestants being the best of their first episode.) | SAFE | SAFE | SAFE | RISK | SAFE | SAFE | RISK | OUT | | | |
| Lemūras ("Lemur") (WC) | Andrius Butkus | Dancer | | | | | | | | SAFE | SAFE | OUT | | | | |
| Keksiukas ("Cupcake") | Gytis Ivanauskas | Actor | | RISK | SAFE | SAFE | SAFE | SAFE | SAFE | RISK | OUT | | | | | |
| Euras ("Euro") | Džiugas Siaurusaitis | Actor | RISK | | SAFE | SAFE | RISK | RISK | SAFE | OUT | | | | | | |
| Širdis ("Heart") | Indre Kavaliauskaite | TV Host | | WIN | RISK | SAFE | SAFE | SAFE | OUT | | | | | | | |
| Pieštukas ("Pencil") | Arnas Mazėtis | Journalist | WIN | | SAFE | RISK | SAFE | OUT | | | | | | | | |
| Gulbė ("Swan") | Aistė Pilvelytė | Singer | RISK | | SAFE | SAFE | OUT | | | | | | | | | |
| Mezginys ("Knitting") | Larisa Kalpokaitė | Actress | | RISK | SAFE | OUT | | | | | | | | | | |
| Medūza ("Medusa") | Jolanta Leonavičiūtė | Model | | WIN | OUT | | | | | | | | | | | |
| Gedimino Pilis ("Gediminas' Tower") | Edgaras Lubys | Musician | | OUT | | | | | | | | | | | | |
| Kukurūzas ("Corn") | Ignas Krupavičius | Journalist | OUT | | | | | | | | | | | | | |

=== Episodes ===
==== Episode 1 (10 September) ====
Performances on the first episode
| # | Stage name | Song | Result | |
|---|---|---|---|---|
| 1 | Bull | "Daina, Raginanti Tautą" by Liūdni Slibinai | WIN | |
| 2 | Euro | "Panelė Verta Milijono" by YVA | RISK | |
| 3 | Swan | "SUPERMODEL" by Måneskin | RISK | |
| 4 | Alien | "Out of Space" by The Prodigy | WIN | |
| 5 | Pencil | "Geltonas Miestas" by Delfinai | WIN | |
| 6 | Corn | "Ten, Kur Noriu" by Justinas Jarutis | RISK | |
| Sing-off details | | | Identity | Result |
| 1 | Swan | "Lift Me Up" by Rihanna | undisclosed | SAFE |
| 2 | Corn | "Palangos Jūroj" by Danielius Dolskis | Ignas Krupavičius | OUT |

==== Episode 2 (17 September) ====
Performances on the second episode
| # | Stage name | Song | Result | |
|---|---|---|---|---|
| 1 | Cupcake | "Single Ladies (Put a Ring on It)" by Beyoncé | RISK | |
| 2 | Heart | "Sarà perché ti amo" by Ricchi e Poveri | WIN | |
| 3 | Raven | "Žvirbliai" by Benjaminas Gorbulskis | WIN | |
| 4 | Gediminas' Tower | "Jei Leisi" by 69 danguje & Gabrielius Vagelis | RISK | |
| 5 | Knitting | "Šampanas (Bul Bul Bul)" by Monika Liu | RISK | |
| 6 | Medusa | "Dark Horse" by Katy Perry | WIN | |
| Sing-off details | | | Identity | Result |
| 1 | Gediminas' Tower | "Nemylėjau Tavęs" by Džordana Butkutė | Edgaras Lubys | OUT |
| 2 | Knitting | "Tik Pasilik" by Leon Somov & Jazzu | undisclosed | SAFE |

==== Episode 3 (24 September) ====
Performances on the third episode
| # | Stage name | Song | Identity | Result |
|---|---|---|---|---|
| 1 | Swan | "Flowers" by Miley Cyrus | undisclosed | SAFE |
| 2 | Pencil | "Lauksiu Tavęs Ateinant" by Nijolė Ščiukaitė | undisclosed | SAFE |
| 3 | Medusa | "Apkabink" by Jessica Shy | Jolanta Leonavičiūtė | OUT |
| 4 | Euro | "Gangsta's Paradise" by Coolio | undisclosed | SAFE |
| 5 | Cupcake | "Su Gimtadieniu" by Vytautas Šiškauskas | undisclosed | SAFE |
| 6 | Alien | "Makeba" by Jain | undisclosed | SAFE |
| 7 | Knitting | "Rytas Perone" by RONDO | undisclosed | SAFE |
| 8 | Heart | "Bloody Mary" by Lady Gaga | undisclosed | RISK |

==== Episode 4 (1 October) ====
Performances on the fourth episode
| # | Stage name | Song | Identity | Result |
|---|---|---|---|---|
| 1 | Alien | "Labas Rytas" by Biplan | undisclosed | RISK |
| 2 | Raven | "Žemyn" by Delfinai | undisclosed | SAFE |
| 3 | Euro | "Moneytalks" by AC/DC | undisclosed | SAFE |
| 4 | Cupcake | "American Pie" by Don McLean | undisclosed | SAFE |
| 5 | Pencil | "Žalia Žalia" by Aktorių trio | undisclosed | RISK |
| 6 | Heart | "Cha Cha Cha" by Käärijä | undisclosed | SAFE |
| 7 | Knitting | "Juodas Garvežys" by Danutė Neimontaitė | Larisa Kalpokaitė | OUT |
| 8 | Bull | "Burtai" by Giedrius Nakas | undisclosed | SAFE |
| 9 | Swan | "Zombie" by The Cranberries | undisclosed | SAFE |

==== Episode 5 (8 October) ====
Performances on the fifth episode
| # | Stage name | Song | Identity | Result |
|---|---|---|---|---|
| 1 | Heart | "Girls Like You" by Maroon 5 | undisclosed | SAFE |
| 2 | Euro | "Money" from Cabaret | undisclosed | RISK |
| 3 | Bull | "Story" by Karolina Meschino | undisclosed | SAFE |
| 4 | Raven | "Kaltas Ruduo" by Naktinės Personos | undisclosed | SAFE |
| 5 | Pencil | "Blue (Da Ba Dee)" by Eiffel 65 | undisclosed | SAFE |
| 6 | Swan | "Proud Mary" by Tina Turner | Aistė Pilvelytė | OUT |
| 7 | Alien | "Žemaitiškas Pavasaris" by Žilvinas Žvagulis | undisclosed | SAFE |
| 8 | Cupcake | "Nothing Compares 2 U" by Sinéad O'Connor | undisclosed | SAFE |

==== Episode 6 (15 October) ====
Performances on the sixth episode
| # | Stage name | Song | Identity | Result |
|---|---|---|---|---|
| 1 | Euro | "Money, Money, Money" by ABBA | undisclosed | RISK |
| 2 | Cupcake | "Tu Ateik į Pasimatymą" by Irūna ir Marius | undisclosed | SAFE |
| 3 | Heart | "Ten O'Clock Postman" by Secret Service | undisclosed | SAFE |
| Wildcard | Hedgehog | "My Way" by Frank Sinatra | undisclosed | SAFE |
| 4 | Raven | "Iš Lėto Leidžiasi Saulė" by Jovani & Karališka Erdvė | undisclosed | SAFE |
| 5 | Pencil | "D.I.S.C.O" by Ottawan | Arnas Mazėtis | OUT |
| 6 | Alien | "Skrisim" by 69 Danguje | undisclosed | SAFE |
| 7 | Bull | "What Is Love" by Haddaway | undisclosed | SAFE |

==== Episode 7 (22 October) ====
Performances on the seventh episode
| # | Stage name | Song | Identity | Result |
|---|---|---|---|---|
| 1 | Raven | "Žemutinių pilių šventės" by Vytautas Kernagis | undisclosed | SAFE |
| 2 | Hedgehog | "Hero" by Micheal Castaldo | undisclosed | SAFE |
| 3 | Heart | "Širdis Ant Balto Sniego" by Natalija Bunkė | Indre Kavaliauskaite | OUT |
| 4 | Alien | "Pamela" by Saulius Prūsaitis | undisclosed | SAFE |
| 5 | Euro | "Canción del Mariachi" by Antonio Banderas & Los Lobos | undisclosed | SAFE |
| 6 | Cupcake | "Mažyte" by Ovidijus Vyšniauskas | undisclosed | SAFE |
| 7 | Bull | "No Woman, No Cry" by Bob Marley and the Wailers | undisclosed | RISK |

==== Episode 8 (29 October) ====
Performances on the eighth episode
| # | Stage name | Song | Identity | Result |
|---|---|---|---|---|
| 1 | Alien | "ITALODISCO" by The Kolors | undisclosed | SAFE |
| 2 | Raven | "Matrica" by Saulius Mykolaitis | undisclosed | SAFE |
| 3 | Euro | "Koja spaudžia gazą" by Vytautas Kernagis | Džiugas Siaurusaitis | OUT |
| Wildcard | Lemur | "I Like to Move It" by Reel 2 Real | undisclosed | SAFE |
| 4 | Hedgehog | "Knockin' on Heaven's Door" by Guns N' Roses | undisclosed | SAFE |
| 5 | Cupcake | "Sugar" by Maroon 5 | undisclosed | RISK |
| 6 | Bull | "Pamiršk mane" by Hiperbolė | undisclosed | SAFE |

==== Episode 9 (5 November) ====
Performances on the fifth episode
| # | Stage name | Song | Identity | Result |
|---|---|---|---|---|
| 1 | Cupcake | "Baby Love" by The Supremes | Gytis Ivanauskas | OUT |
| 2 | Bull | "Aš Mylėjau Tave Tau Nežinant" by Aktorių trio | undisclosed | SAFE |
| 3 | Hedgehog | "Cant Feel My Face" by The Weeknd | undisclosed | SAFE |
| Wildcard | Broccoli | "Bombastic" by Shaggy | undisclosed | SAFE |
| 4 | Raven | "Sentimentai" by Monika Liu | undisclosed | SAFE |
| 5 | Alien | "Super Freaky Girl" by Nicki Minaj | undisclosed | SAFE |
| 6 | Lemur | "Saulė Šviečia" by Baltasis Kiras | undisclosed | RISK |

==== Episode 10 (12 November) ====
Performances on the tenth episode
| # | Stage name | Song | Identity | Result |
|---|---|---|---|---|
| 1 | Broccoli | "Bad Guy" by Billie Eilish | undisclosed | SAFE |
| 2 | Raven | "39" by Saulius Prūsaitis | undisclosed | SAFE |
| 3 | Lemur | "Sweet Dreams (Are Made of This)" by Marilyn Manson | Andrius Butkus | OUT |
| Wildcard | Christmas Tree | "Laukiu Kalėdų" by YVA | undisclosed | SAFE |
| 4 | Alien | "Mėnulis" by Alina Orlova | undisclosed | SAFE |
| 5 | Hedgehog | "Обійми" by Okean Elzy | undisclosed | SAFE |
| 6 | Bull | "Discoteka" by Egidijus Sipavičius | undisclosed | RISK |
| 7 | Apple | "Tamsus langas" by Asta Pilypaitė | Rafailas Karpis | GUEST |

==== Episode 11 (19 November) ====
Performances on the eleventh episode
| # | Stage name | Song | Identity | Result |
|---|---|---|---|---|
| 1 | Toast | "Tėvelis" by Aleksandras Makejevas | Sergej "Kuvalda" Maslobojev | GUEST |
| 2 | Christmas Tree | "Mokyklinis Valsas" by Mokinukės | undisclosed | SAFE |
| 3 | Raven | "What a Life" by Scarlet Pleasure | undisclosed | RISK |
| 4 | Hedgehog | "I Believe I Can Fly" by R. Kelly | undisclosed | SAFE |
| 5 | Bull | "Lietuva (Mūsų kaimas)" by Vytautas Šiškauskas | Laurynas Suodaitis | OUT |
| 6 | Broccoli | "The Rockafeller Skank" by Fatboy Slim | undisclosed | SAFE |
| 7 | Alien | "Unholy" by Sam Smith & Kim Petras | undisclosed | SAFE |

==== Episode 12 (26 November) ====
Performances on the twelfth episode
| # | Stage name | Song | Identity | Result |
|---|---|---|---|---|
| 1 | Snowman | "Я о́чень рад, ведь я, наконе́ц, возвраща́юсь домо́й" by Eduard Khil | Marius Jampolskis | GUEST |
| 2 | Alien | "Barbie World" by Nicki Minaj & Ice Spice ft. Aqua | undisclosed | SAFE |
| 3 | Broccoli | "Tyliai Pakuždėk" by Jessica Shy & Nombeko Augustė | Jonas Nainys | OUT |
| 4 | Raven | "Paukščiai" by Aktorių trio | undisclosed | SAFE |
| 5 | Lipstick | "Lūpytės" by Baltasis Kiras | Dovilė Kundrotaitė | GUEST |
| 6 | Hedgehog | "Dance Monkey" by Tones and I | undisclosed | RISK |
| 7 | Christmas Tree | "Palauksiu kol užmigsi" by Monique | undisclosed | SAFE |

==== Episode 13 (3 December) ====
- Group performance: "Celebration" by Kool & the Gang

Performances on the thirteenth episode
| # | Stage name | Song | Identity | Result |
|---|---|---|---|---|
| 1 | Alien | "Fly Me to the Moon" by Frank Sinatra | WIN | |
| 2 | Christmas Tree | "Dūšia" by Leon Somov & Monika Linkytė | RISK | |
| 3 | Raven | "Kunigunda" by Vaidas Baumila | WIN | |
| 4 | Hedgehog | "Tattoo" by Loreen | RISK | |
| Face-off details | | | Identity | Result |
| 1 | Christmas Tree | "Dviese (Egle, Mano Sese)" by RONDO | Sandra Žutautienė | OUT |
| 2 | Hedgehog | "Savęs" by Justinas Jarutis | undisclosed | SAFE |

==== Episode 14 – Finale (10 December) ====
Performances on the fourteenth episode
| # | Stage name | Song | Identity | Result |
|---|---|---|---|---|
| 1 | Hedgehog | "Vaikystės Stogas" by FOJE | Anyanya Udongwo | THIRD |
| 1 | Hedgehog | "Giant" by Calvin Harris & Rag'n'Bone Man | Anyanya Udongwo | THIRD |
| 2 | Alien | "Cosmic Girl" by Jamiroquai | Ugnė Siparė | RUNNER-UP |
| 2 | Alien | "Born This Way" by Lady Gaga | Ugnė Siparė | RUNNER-UP |
| 3 | Raven | "Love of My Life" by Queen | Dainius Kazlauskas | WINNER |
| 3 | Raven | "Vėl švieski" by Stasys Povilaitis | Dainius Kazlauskas | WINNER |

== Season 5 (2024) ==
| Stage name | Celebrity | Notability | Episodes | | | | | | | | | | | | | |
| Stage name | Celebrity | Notability | 1 | 2 | 3 | 4 | 5 | 6 | 7 | 8 | 9 | 10 | 11 | 12 | 13 | 14 |
|---|---|---|---|---|---|---|---|---|---|---|---|---|---|---|---|---|
| Zebras ("Zebra") | Arnas Ašmonas | Actor | RISK | | SAFE | SAFE | SAFE | RISK | SAFE | SAFE | RISK | SAFE | SAFE | RISK | RISK | WINNER |
| Tigras ("Tiger") | Linas Vaitkevičius | Singer | | WIN | SAFE | RISK | SAFE | SAFE | SAFE | SAFE | SAFE | RISK | RISK | RISK | WIN | RUNNER-UP |
| Jūrų Vėplys ("Walrus") (WC) | Marius Repšys | Actor | | | | | | | | | SAFE | SAFE | SAFE | SAFE | WIN | THIRD |
| Agurkas ("Cucumber") (WC) | Erika Vitulskienė | Businesswoman | | | | | | | | | SAFE | SAFE | SAFE | SAFE | OUT | |
| Džokeris ("Joker") (WC) | Arūnas Valinskas | TV Show Host | | | | | | | | | | | RISK | OUT | | |
| Musė ("Fly") | Edvinas Šeškus | Basketballer | WIN | | RISK | SAFE | SAFE | SAFE | SAFE | SAFE | SAFE | SAFE | OUT | | | |
| Auksinė Žuvelė ("Goldfish") (WC) | Goda Alijeva | Singer | | | | | | | SAFE | SAFE | SAFE | OUT | | | | |
| Karvė ("Cow") | Justina Partikė | Influencer | | RISK | SAFE | SAFE | SAFE | SAFE | SAFE | RISK | OUT | | | | | |
| Voverė ("Squirrel") | Dalia Belickaitė | TV Show Host | WIN | | SAFE | SAFE | RISK | SAFE | RISK | OUT | | | | | | |
| Erelis ("Eagle") | Adomas Grinius | TV Host | WIN | | IMM (Note: Eagle and Paint gained immunity for the third and fourth episodes due to the contestants being the best of their first episode.) | | SAFE | SAFE | OUT | | | | | | | |
| Dažai ("Paint") | Vaidotas Žala | Rally Driver | | WIN | IMM (Note: Eagle and Paint gained immunity for the third and fourth episodes due to the contestants being the best of their first episode.) | | SAFE | OUT | | | | | | | | |
| Lašiniai ("Bacon") | Šarūnas Mačiulis | Musician | | WIN | SAFE | SAFE | OUT | | | | | | | | | |
| Saldainis ("Candy") | Vygintas Kaikaris | Plastic Surgeon | | RISK | SAFE | OUT | | | | | | | | | | |
| Kometa ("Comet") | Keitė Arai | TV Show Host | RISK | | OUT | | | | | | | | | | | |
| Nykštukas ("Dwarf") | Eugenijus Skerstonas | Author | | OUT | | | | | | | | | | | | |
| Moliūgas ("Pumpkin") | Orijus Gasanovas | Traveler | OUT | | | | | | | | | | | | | |

=== Episodes ===
==== Episode 1 (16 November) ====
Performances on the first episode
| # | Stage name | Song | Result | |
|---|---|---|---|---|
| 1 | Pumpkin | "Oi Oi Oi (Dar Kartą)" by Saulius Prūsaitis | RISK | |
| 2 | Fly | "Ačiū" by Remis Retro | WIN | |
| 3 | Zebra | "I'm Sexy and I Know It" by LMFAO | RISK | |
| 4 | Eagle | "You're My Mate" by Right Said Fred | WIN | |
| 5 | Squirrel | "Paint the Town Red" by Doja Cat | WIN | |
| 6 | Comet | "The Code" by Nemo | RISK | |
| Sing-off details | | | Identity | Result |
| 1 | Pumpkin | "Around the World" by Daft Punk | Orijus Gasanovas | OUT |
| 2 | Comet | "Tyliai Pakuždėk" by Jessica Shy | undisclosed | SAFE |

==== Episode 2 (23 November) ====
Performances on the second episode
| # | Stage name | Song | Result | |
|---|---|---|---|---|
| 1 | Cow | "Pedro" by Agatino Romero & Raffaella Carrà | RISK | |
| 2 | Bacon | "Luktelk" by Silvester Belt | WIN | |
| 3 | Paint | "Autośtradoje Vilnius - Kaunas" by 16 Hz | WIN | |
| 4 | Dwarf | "Sahara" by Mireille Mathieu | RISK | |
| 5 | Candy | "Du Hast" by Rammstein | RISK | |
| 6 | Tiger | "Eye of the Tiger" by Survivor | WIN | |
| Sing-off details | | | Identity | Result |
| 1 | Cow | "Kontrolinis Šūvis" by SEL | undisclosed | SAFE |
| 2 | Dwarf | "Apprends-Moi" by Mireille Mathieu | Eugenijus Skerstonas | OUT |

==== Episode 3 (30 November) ====
Performances on the third episode
| # | Stage name | Song | Identity | Result |
|---|---|---|---|---|
| 1 | Squirrel | "Boys (Summertime Love)" by Sabrina | undisclosed | SAFE |
| 2 | Tiger | "The Lion Sleeps Tonight" by The Tokens | undisclosed | SAFE |
| 3 | Bacon | "Ko tu stovi?" by Antis | undisclosed | SAFE |
| 4 | Comet | "I Like the Way You Kiss Me" by Artemas | Keitė Arai | OUT |
| 5 | Fly | "Aš Myliu Kiną" by ŽAS | undisclosed | RISK |
| 6 | Cow | "Milkshake" by Kelis | undisclosed | SAFE |
| 7 | Candy | "Oi Kur Reiks Tas Mergas Dėt?" by Sadūnai | undisclosed | SAFE |
| 8 | Zebra | "Apžavai" by Vaidas Baumila | undisclosed | SAFE |

==== Episode 4 (7 December) ====
Performances on the fourth episode
| # | Stage name | Song | Identity | Result |
|---|---|---|---|---|
| 1 | Tiger | "Žemaičių Robinhudas" by Vytautas Babravičius | undisclosed | RISK |
| 2 | Squirrel | "Kaip gražu miške" by Vytautas Kernagis | undisclosed | SAFE |
| 3 | Fly | "Nesibaigianti vasara" by 8 Kambarys | undisclosed | SAFE |
| 4 | Zebra | "Seven Nation Army" by The White Stripes | undisclosed | SAFE |
| 5 | Cow | "Take Me Home, Country Roads" by John Denver | undisclosed | SAFE |
| 6 | Bacon | "Stumblin' In" by Chris Norman and Suzi Quatro | undisclosed | SAFE |
| 7 | Candy | "Iš Lėto Leidžiasi Saulė" by Jovani & Karališka Erdvė | Vygintas Kaikaris | OUT |

==== Episode 5 (14 December) ====
Performances on the fifth episode
| # | Stage name | Song | Identity | Result |
|---|---|---|---|---|
| 1 | Fly | "Amerikonas Grįžo Sūnus" by Žilvinas Žvagulis | undisclosed | SAFE |
| 2 | Bacon | "Man Trūksta Dienų" by Gabrielius Vagelis | Šarūnas Mačiulis | OUT |
| 3 | Zebra | "Moon River" by Henry Mancini | undisclosed | SAFE |
| 4 | Paint | "Summer Of 69" by Bryan Adams | undisclosed | SAFE |
| 5 | Cow | "Dūšia" by Leon Somov & Monika Linkytė | undisclosed | SAFE |
| 6 | Eagle | "Fly On The Wings Of Love" by Olsen Brothers | undisclosed | SAFE |
| 7 | Tiger | "Rami" by Justinas Jarutis | undisclosed | SAFE |
| 8 | Squirrel | "Super Mergaitės" by 69 Danguje | undisclosed | RISK |

==== Episode 6 (21 December) ====
Performances on the sixth episode
| # | Stage name | Song | Identity | Result |
|---|---|---|---|---|
| 1 | Cow | "Me Too" by Meghan Trainor | undisclosed | SAFE |
| 2 | Eagle | "Tamsoje" by Justinas Jarutis | undisclosed | SAFE |
| 3 | Paint | "Love Sees No Colour" by U96 | Vaidotas Žala | OUT |
| 4 | Zebra | "Gyvenimo Arklys" by Poliarizuoti Stiklai | undisclosed | RISK |
| 5 | Fly | "Senelė" by Stasys Povilaitis | undisclosed | SAFE |
| 6 | Tiger | "Roar" by Katy Perry | undisclosed | SAFE |
| 7 | Squirrel | "Norim Dar" by Donatas Montvydas | undisclosed | SAFE |

==== Episode 7 (28 December) ====
Performances on the seventh episode
| # | Stage name | Song | Identity | Result |
|---|---|---|---|---|
| 1 | Zebra | "I Want It That Way" by Backstreet Boys | undisclosed | SAFE |
| 2 | Fly | "Vasara Mano" by Egidijus Sipavičius | undisclosed | SAFE |
| 3 | Squirrel | "Cha Cha Cha" by Käärijä | undisclosed | RISK |
| Wildcard | Goldfish | "Jūra" by Yva | undisclosed | SAFE |
| 4 | Tiger | "Bones" by Imagine Dragons | undisclosed | SAFE |
| 5 | Cow | "Pamela" by Saulius Prūsaitis | undisclosed | SAFE |
| 6 | Eagle | "Sparnai Tavo Sielai" by Petras Daunys | Adomas Grinius | OUT |

==== Episode 8 (4 January) ====
Performances on the seventh episode
| # | Stage name | Song | Identity | Result |
|---|---|---|---|---|
| 1 | Squirrel | "Wannabe" by Spice Girls | RISK | |
| 2 | Tiger | "Katyčių Dainelė" by YVA | SAFE | |
| 3 | Fly | "We Will Rock You" by Queen | SAFE | |
| 4 | Cow | "Raudonoj Šviesoj" by Adrina | RISK | |
| 5 | Goldfish | "Jūra" by Jovani & Taja | SAFE | |
| 6 | Zebra | "SexyBack" by Justin Timberlake | SAFE | |
| Sing-off details | | | Identity | Result |
| 1 | Squirrel | "Let's Get Loud" by Jennifer Lopez | Dalia Belickaitė | OUT |
| 2 | Cow | "Old McDonald Had a Farm" | undisclosed | SAFE |

==== Episode 9 (11 January) ====
Performances on the ninth episode
| # | Stage name | Song | Identity | Result |
|---|---|---|---|---|
| Wildcard | Cucumber | "Vakar Vakare" by Rokas | undisclosed | SAFE |
| 1 | Zebra | "Jailhouse Rock" by Elvis Presley | undisclosed | RISK |
| 2 | Tiger | "Fiesta" by Radži | undisclosed | SAFE |
| 3 | Goldfish | "Kunigunda" by Vaidas Baumila | undisclosed | SAFE |
| Wildcard | Walrus | "2mbla" by Pompo | undisclosed | SAFE |
| 4 | Cow | "Aš bėgu" by Lauris Reiniks | Justina Partikė | OUT |
| 5 | Fly | "I'm Still Standing" by Elton John | undisclosed | SAFE |

==== Episode 10 (18 January) ====
Performances on the tenth episode
| # | Stage name | Song | Identity | Result |
|---|---|---|---|---|
| 1 | Clock | "Ar Mylit Ją Jūs" by Marijonas Mikutavičius | Rimvydas Širvinskas | GUEST |
| 2 | Walrus | "Yellow Submarine" by The Beatles | undisclosed | SAFE |
| 3 | Goldfish | "Išvažiuosiu Prie Jūros" by Džordana Butkutė | Goda Alijeva | OUT |
| 4 | Fly | "24K Magic" by Bruno Mars | undisclosed | SAFE |
| 5 | Cucumber | "Kai pravirksta angelai" by 69 Danguje | undisclosed | SAFE |
| 6 | Zebra | "Vėlumoj" by Martynas Kavaliauskas | undisclosed | SAFE |
| 7 | Tiger | "Can You Feel The Love Tonight" by Elton John | undisclosed | RISK |

==== Episode 11 (25 January) ====
Performances on the eleventh episode
| # | Stage name | Song | Identity | Result |
|---|---|---|---|---|
| 1 | Zebra | "I Ain't Worried" by OneRepublic | SAFE | |
| 2 | Fly | "Suknelė" by Vaidas Baumila | RISK | |
| 3 | Cucumber | "Mylėt Tave Taip Beprotiška Ir Keista" by Lemon Joy | SAFE | |
| 4 | Walrus | "Song 2" by Blur | SAFE | |
| 5 | Tiger | "Ridig Do" by Ventukai | RISK | |
| Sing-off details | | | Identity | Result |
Round 1
| 1 | Fly | "Where Is The Love?" by Black Eyed Peas | RISK | |
| 2 | Tiger | "Akimirkai Trumpai" by Liepa Mondeikaite | SAFE | |
Round 2
| 3 | Fly | N/A | Edvinas Šeškus | OUT |
| 3 | Joker | "Dingo" by Inga Valinskienė | undisclosed | SAFE |

==== Episode 12 (1 February) ====
Performances on the twelfth episode
| # | Stage name | Song | Identity | Result |
|---|---|---|---|---|
| 1 | Cucumber | "Tingiu" by Gintarė Karaliūnaitė | SAFE | |
| 2 | Tiger | "I Don't Wanna Wait" by David Guetta & OneRepublic | RISK | |
| 3 | Zebra | "Nakty" by Kastytis Kerbedis | RISK | |
| 4 | Walrus | "Kažkas Atsitiko (Ne Tau Martynai)" by Antis | SAFE | |
| 5 | Joker | "Neliesk" by Bande Role | RISK | |
| Sing-off details | | | Identity | Result |
| 1 | Tiger | "Rudens naktis sustojo" by Leon Somov & Jazzu | undisclosed | SAFE |
| 2 | Zebra | "Creep" by Radiohead | undisclosed | SAFE |
| 3 | Joker | "Viskas bus gerai" by Donny Montell | Arūnas Valinskas | OUT |

==== Episode 13 (8 February) ====
Performances on the thirteenth episode
| # | Stage name | Song | Identity | Result |
|---|---|---|---|---|
| 1 | Tiger | "It's My Life" by Bon Jovi | WIN | |
| 2 | Cucumber | "Verdame Bulvytę" by Eugenijus Ostapenko & Pravalturas | RISK | |
| 3 | Zebra | "Šiandien Tu Man Graži" by Mantas Jankavičius | RISK | |
| 4 | Walrus | "Shotgun" by George Ezra | WIN | |
| Sing-off details | | | Identity | Result |
| 1 | Zebra | "Lopšinė" by Pelenai | undisclosed | SAFE |
| 2 | Cucumber | "Meilės Laivas" by Rytis Cicinas | Erika Vitulskienė | OUT |

==== Episode 14 – Finale (15 February) ====
Performances on the fourteenth episode
| # | Stage name | Song | Identity | Result |
|---|---|---|---|---|
| 1 | Tiger | "Baltas paukštis" by Vytautas Kernagis | Linas Vaitkevičius | RUNNER-UP |
| 1 | Tiger | "I Want to Break Free" by Queen | Linas Vaitkevičius | RUNNER-UP |
| 2 | Walrus | "Fantazijos" by Remis Retro | Marius Repšys | THIRD |
| 2 | Walrus | "Kaboom!" by VB Gang | Marius Repšys | THIRD |
| 3 | Zebra | "Bum Ajajai" by Vaidas Baumila | Arnas Ašmonas | WINNER |
| 3 | Zebra | "Rim Tim Tagi Dim" by Baby Lasagna | Arnas Ašmonas | WINNER |
