= List of Lithuanian singers =

This is a list of Lithuanian singers in alphabetical order.

== 4 ==
- 4Fun

== A ==
- Nijolė Ambrazaitytė (1939–2016)
- Atlanta (1981)

== B ==
- Silvester Belt (1997)
- Vytautas Babravičius (1952)
- Vaidas Baumila (1987)
- Beatrich (1998)

== C ==
- Alanas Chošnau (1974)

== D ==
- Danielius Dolskis (1891–1931)

== F ==
- Fusedmarc

== G ==
- Vaida Genytė (1974)
- GiedRé (1985)
- GJan (1995)
- Asmik Grigorian (1981)
- Justina Gringytė (1986)

== I ==
- InCulto

== J ==
- Inga Jankauskaitė (1981)
- Mantas Jankavičius (1980)
- Severija Janušauskaitė (1981)
- Justinas Jarutis (1988)
- Jarosekas Quartet
- Gintarė Jautakaitė (1958)
- Vytautas Juozapaitis (1963)
- Eglė Jurgaitytė (1998)

== K ==
- Katarsis
- Rasa Kaušiūtė (1977)
- Nomeda Kazlaus (1974)
- Vytautas Kernagis (1951–2008)

== L ==
- Laura and the Lovers
- Judita Leitaitė (1959)
- Nechama Lifshitz (1927–2017)
- Linas and Simona
- Monika Linkytė (1992)
- Monika Liu (1988)
- Arnoldas Lukošius (1967)

== M ==
- Andrius Mamontovas (1967)
- Mango
- Vilija Matačiūnaitė (1986)
- Mia (1983)
- Marijonas Mikutavičius (1971)
- Jeronimas Milius (1984)
- Donny Montell (1987)
- Saulius Mykolaitis (1966–2006)
- Vilija Matačiūnaitė (1984)

== N ==
- Ieva Narkutė (1987)
- Virgilijus Noreika (1935–2018)

== O ==
- Alina Orlova (1988)

== P ==
- Kipras Petrauskas (1885–1968)
- Aistė Pilvelytė (1979)
- Andrius Pojavis (1983)
- Stasys Povilaitis (1947–2015)

== R ==
- Radži (1987)
- Violeta Riaubiškytė-Tarasovienė (1974)
- Mindaugas Rojus (1981)
- The Roop
- Audrius Rubežius (1966)

== S ==
- Evelina Sašenko (1987)
- Sati (1976)
- Rūta Ščiogolevaitė (1981)
- Jurga Šeduikytė (1980)
- Neringa Siaudikyte (1990)
- Simonna (1995)
- SKAMP
- Jomantė Šležaitė (1989)
- Aistė Smilgevičiūtė (1977)
- Sasha Son (1983)
- Stano (1981)
- Aivaras Stepukonis (1972)
- Sigutė Stonytė (1955)
- Silvestras Beltė

== U ==
- Violeta Urmana (1961)

== V ==
- Lena Valaitis (1943)
- Jurijus Veklenko (1990)
- Ovidijus Vyšniauskas (1957)

== Z ==
- Žalvarinis
- Ieva Zasimauskaitė (1993)

== See also ==
- Music of Lithuania
