= Marius Berenis =

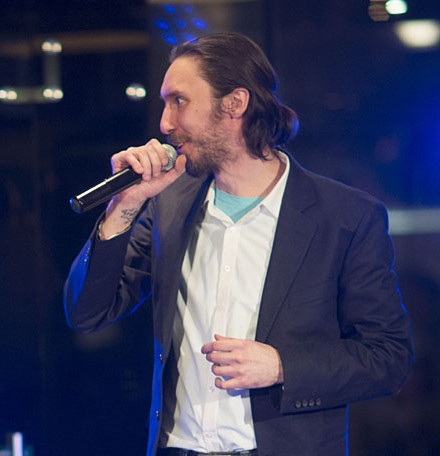
- Marijus Berenis

Background information
- Born: Marijus; 4 March 1973 (age 53); Vilnius, Lithuania
- Genres: Rap metal Alternative rock Death Metal; Pop music
- Occupations: Radio personality, bandleader, actor, musician, TV personality

Marius Berenis, also known by his stage name Tru (born March 4, 1973, in Vilnius, Lithuania) is a Lithuanian radio and television personality, musician and actor. He is the founder and a former member of the Lithuanian pop-rock group Žas.

Berenis began his career in the early 1990s with the death metal band Regredior, one of the first metal bands from Lithuania to release an album under a foreign record label. He later co-founded the pop-rock group Žas, which became well known for its humorous and satirical songs. Over the years, Berenis has participated in a variety of TV projects and shows.

In addition to his musical career, Marius Berenis has also worked as a radio and television host. He has been a prominent figure on the radio station M-1 (Lithuanian radio station) and has presented several television shows. Currently, he is a staff member, show creator, and host at the Lithuanian radio station Lietus, where he has also been working as a music editor since 2019.

Personal Life:

Marius Berenis has been married twice. He first married at the age of 24, but the marriage ended after five years. In 2017, he married his second wife, Sigita.
