= Po dangum =

Single by Monika Linkytė

from the album Walk With Me
- Released: June 2015
- Genre: Pop
- Length: 3:50
- Label: Gyva Muzika
- Songwriter(s): Leon Somov & Jazzu
- Producer(s): Leon Somov & Jazzu

Monika Linkytė singles chronology
| ""This Time"" (2015) | "Po dangum" (2015) | "Žodžių nereikia" (2015) |

"Po dangum" is a song recorded by Lithuanian recording artist Monika Linkytė. It was written and produced by Leon Somov and Jazzu for her debut studio album Walk With Me (2015). It is most-watched song in the Lithuanian language on YouTube platform, as of March 2025 it has more than 27 million views.

== Awards and nominations ==
| Year | Award | Category | Result |
|---|---|---|---|
| 2015 | M.A.M.A Awards | Best Song | Won |
