= Walk with Me (Monika Linkytė album) =

Studio album by Monika Linkytė
- Released: September 17, 2015
- Genre: Pop
- Length: 37:34
- Label: Gyva Muzika
- Producer: Jazzu; Leon Somov

Singles from Walk with Me
- 1. "Skęstu" Released: 30 November 2014; 2. "This Time" Released: February 2015; 3. "Po dangum" Released: June 2015; 4. "Žodžių nereikia" Released: October 2015; 5. "Krentu žemyn" Released: February 2016

Walk with Me is the debut studio album by Monika Linkytė, released on 17 September 2015 on the independent record label Gyva Muzika. Its third single "Po dangum" is the most-viewed YouTube video in the Lithuanian language.

== Track listing ==
No.	Title	Length
1.	"Po Dangum"	3:51
2.	"Wrong"	3:32
3.	"Krentu Žemyn"	3:18
4.	"Flying"	3:30
5.	"Aitvarai"	3:18
6.	"Did I Tell You"	3:21
7.	"Walk With Me"	4:39
8.	"Žodžių Nereikia"	3:15
9.	"You"	2:40
10.	"Skęstu"	3:24
11.	"This Time"	3:02
Total length:		37:34

== Awards and nominations ==
Year	Award	Category	Result
2015	M.A.M.A Awards	Best Album	Won
