= Hiperbolė =

Lithuanian rock music band

- Origin: Vilnius, Lithuania
- Genres: Rock
- Years active: 1974–1984, 1991, 1996–1998, 2024–
- Members: Michailas Garberis; Viktoras Prapras; Igoris Berinas; Ričardas Bartusevičius; Arvydas Šnaras

Hiperbolė (Hyperbole in english) were a Lithuanian rock band formed in 1974 in Vilnius by Viktoras Prapras and Ričardas Bartusevičius. The most successful incarnation of the group included Michailas Garberis (vocals, guitar), Viktoras Prapras (vocals, keyboard), Igoris Berinas (vocals, guitar), Ričardas Bartuševičius (supporting vocals, bass guitar), Arvydas Šnaras (additional vocals, drums). "Hiperbolė" literally means "hyperbola".

== History ==
=== Formation and early history (1974–1977) ===
In 1974, two students from Vilnius Institute of Civil Engineering, Viktoras Prapras and Ričardas Bartusevičius formed a musical group. At first, they played music created by the Beatles, Creedence Clearwater Revival, Deep Purple and few songs of their own. However, on September 1 of the same year, they had a more serious performance at a student party. In July 1975, Viktoras Prapras became the band's official leader. In the same year, Ričardas Bartusevičius gave the band the name Hiperbolė, but it wasn't known by this name until later.

Later on, the quality of the performance of the band improved and eventually it was noticed by the Culture Department of the Center Committee of the Lithuanian Communist Party. In 1975, drummer Arvydas Šnaras and second vocalist Michailas Garberis joined the band. Michailas Garberis became the leader of the band in the same year.

=== Rise to fame (1977–1979) ===
In 1977 the band was criticized for having temperamental performances and shocking arrangements. In the same year, Igoris Berinas replaced Arvydas Sriubys.

In 1978, the members of the band started to create their own songs. Soon the band faced strong Soviet censorship, which became much stronger after the self-immolation of Romas Kalanta in 1972. As a consequence, Hiperbolė started creating songs according to Lithuanian poems and arranging songs of other soviet music. Personal music could only be heard in non-official events and only with the forgiveness of the Soviet government. Hiperbolė also played the songs of Nazareth, Bad Company, ABBA and Uriah Heep.

=== The regular lineup of the band and temporary dissolution (1977–1984) ===
In 1979, Hiperbolė had a steady lineup that will be known as the most successful incarnation of the group. In 1980, Hiperbolė were given an official honorary title by the Soviet government. From 1980 to 1984, Hiperbolė was heading for commercial success. During this short period, the popularity of the band was growing. They began selling their music and having regular concerts. In 1980, the band had 64 concerts, in 1982 – 104, and in 1983 – 156. In 1984, they became the Philharmonic ensemble. Unfortunately, in 1984, the Soviet government dissolved the band because they saw it as a threat to the communist system.

=== The return and temporary collapse (1984–1991) ===
After the dissolution of the USSR in 1991, Hiperbolė returned. They were met with the slogan Hiperbolė per amžius! (Hiperbolė For Eternity!). They had 40 concerts but due to financial problems, the band collapsed in the same year.

=== The second return (1996–1998) ===
In 1998, Hiperbolė returned once again. During the four years, the band has released four studio albums.

=== Musical style ===
The group’s sound was influenced by contemporary psychedelic, folk and progressive rock bands such The Beatles, CCR, The Doors and Led Zeppelin; clean, mid-tempo guitar melodies were often accompanied by mellow, unadorned drumbeats. Some of the songs’ lyrics came at odds with the socialist realist genre propagated in Soviet art at the time as they were rooted in natural symbolism and romanticism. The songs contemplated imagination, love, longing and the natural world.
