= Juozas Petkevičius =

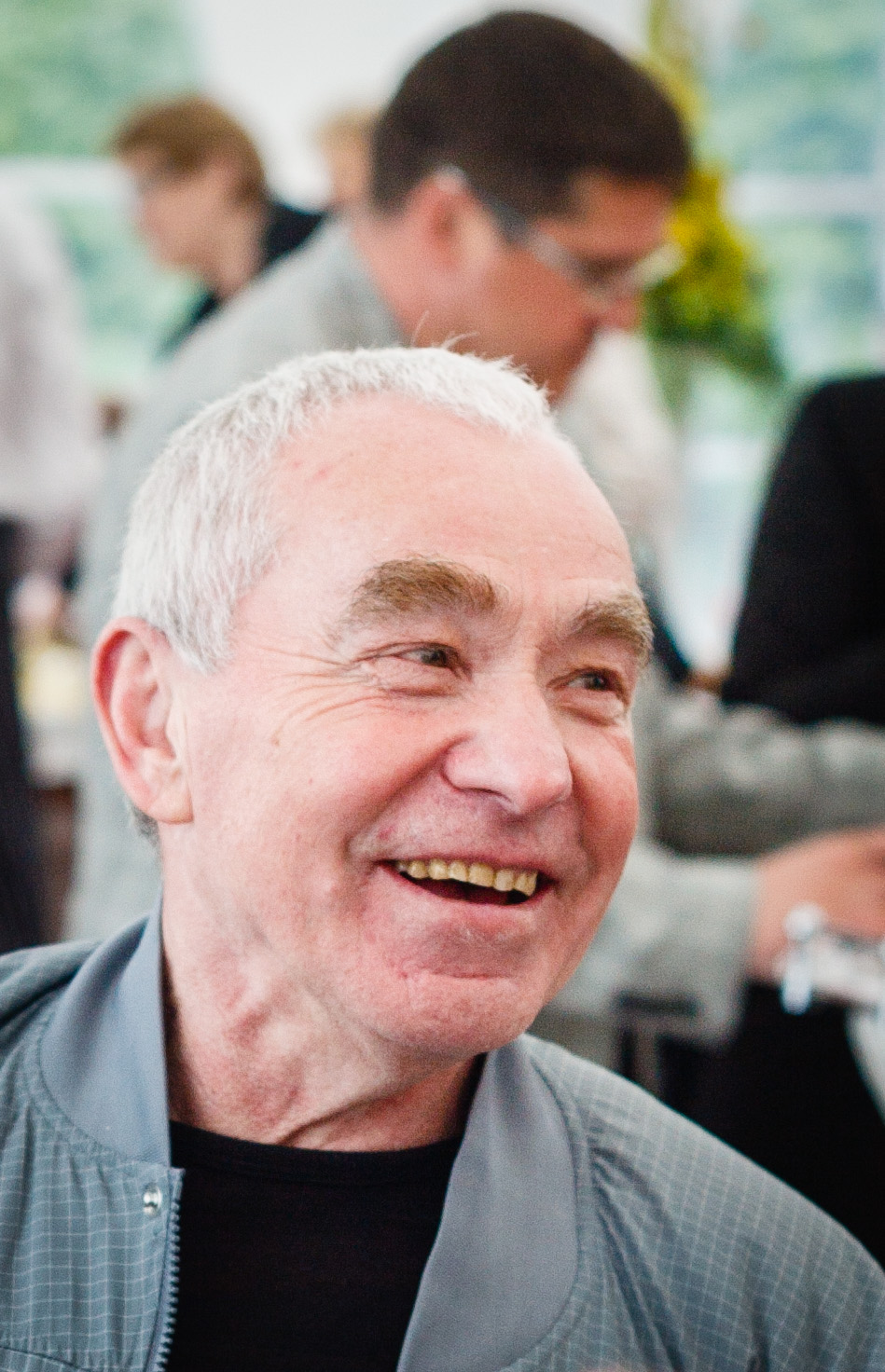
Juozas Petkevičius during basketball jubilee celebration

Juozas "Juozukas" Petkevičius (born 8 April 1946 in Molėtai, Lithuanian SSR, Soviet Union) is a Lithuanian basketball coach, masseur, and former rugby player. He is often regarded as mascot of Lithuania men's national basketball team.

According to Petkevičius, his dream was to play basketball, however basketball coaches, including Vladas Garastas who in Petkevičius childhood worked in Biržai, rejected him due to his small height. Nevertheless, he retained his aspirations to somehow become a part of basketball environment. Petkevičius graduated from the State Institute of Physical Education and eventually specialized in massaging, later while working in the Neurology Department of the Kaunas Clinics he was invited to work as a masseur to the Žalgiris Kaunas where in 1984–1993 he worked with Lithuanian basketball legends like Arvydas Sabonis, Rimas Kurtinaitis and the team was coached by Vladas Garastas. Subsequently he worked as masseur in other Lithuanian basketball clubs BC Atletas Kaunas (1995–1999), BC Alytus (1999–2000), Lietuvos rytas Vilnius (2000–2009, returned in 2017), Perlas Vilnius (joined in 2009), Wolves Vilnius (2022–2023). Moreover, since 1991 he worked as masseur in the Lithuania men's national basketball team that competed in six Olympic Games (1992, 1996, 2000, 2004, 2008, 2012, 2016) and other FIBA competitions (e.g. EuroBasket 2003, where Lithuania won gold). Even being over 80 years old he continued working in the Lithuania men's national basketball team.

In 2014, Petkevičius was one of the contestants in Lithuanian version of reality show Celebrity Splash! called Šuolis!.

== Career ==
- 1992–present Lithuania men's national basketball team: masseur
- 1994–1999 Atletas Kaunas: coach, masseur (LKL)
- 1999–2000 Alita Alytus: masseur (LKL)
- 2000–2008 Lietuvos rytas Vilnius: masseur (LKL)
- Perlas Vilnius
- 2017–2022 Lietuvos rytas Vilnius: physiotherapist, masseur (LKL)
- 2022–2023 Wolves Vilnius: physiotherapist, masseur (LKL)

== Personal life ==
Wife Vilija, son Vaidas and daughter Miglė.
