= Jarosekas Quartet =

Lithuanian music group

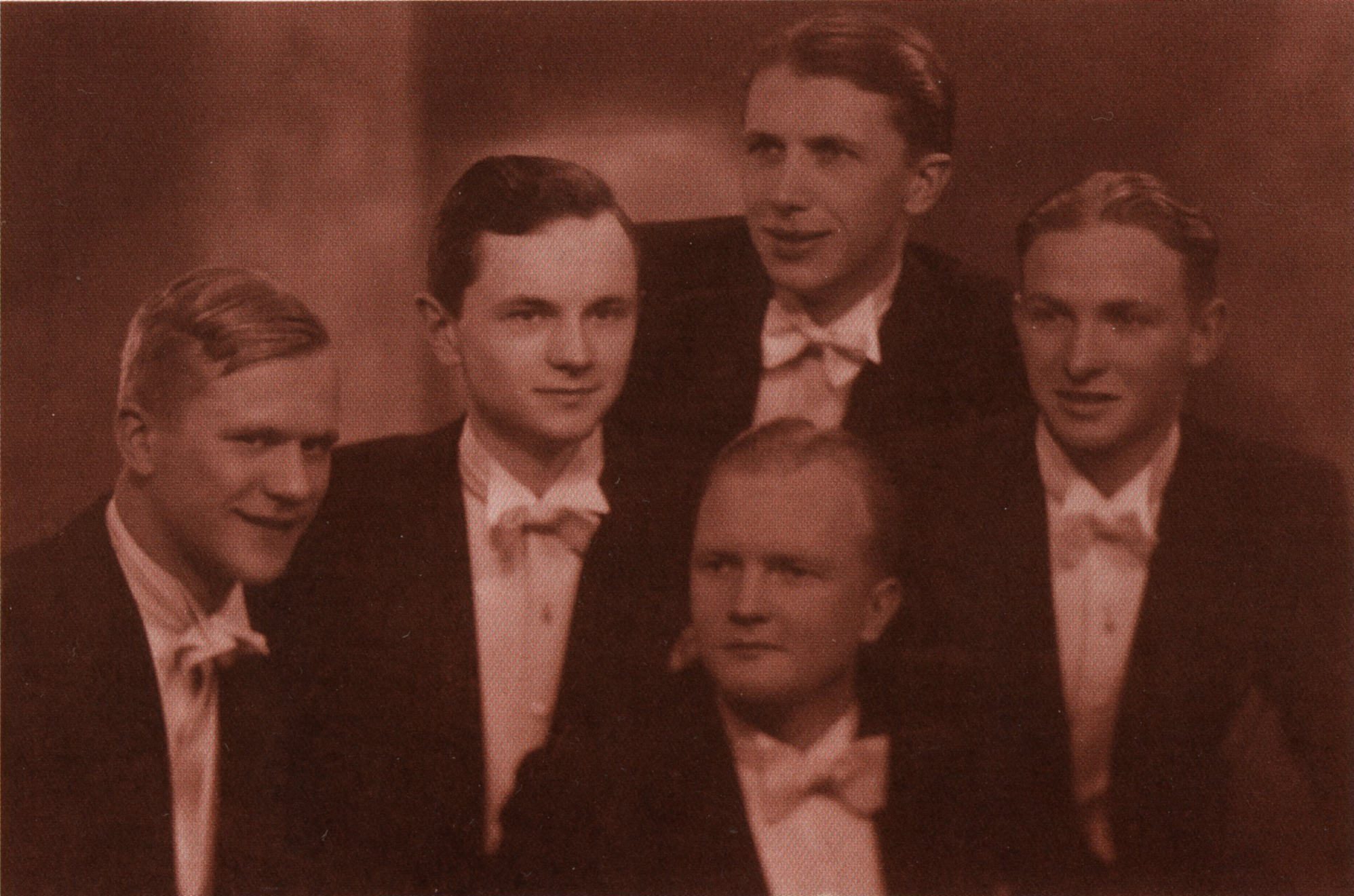
Seated: Liudas Jarošekas; Standing from left: Jurgis Dauknys, Algirdas Matukonis, Aleksas Paulionis and Vytautas Žmuidzinas

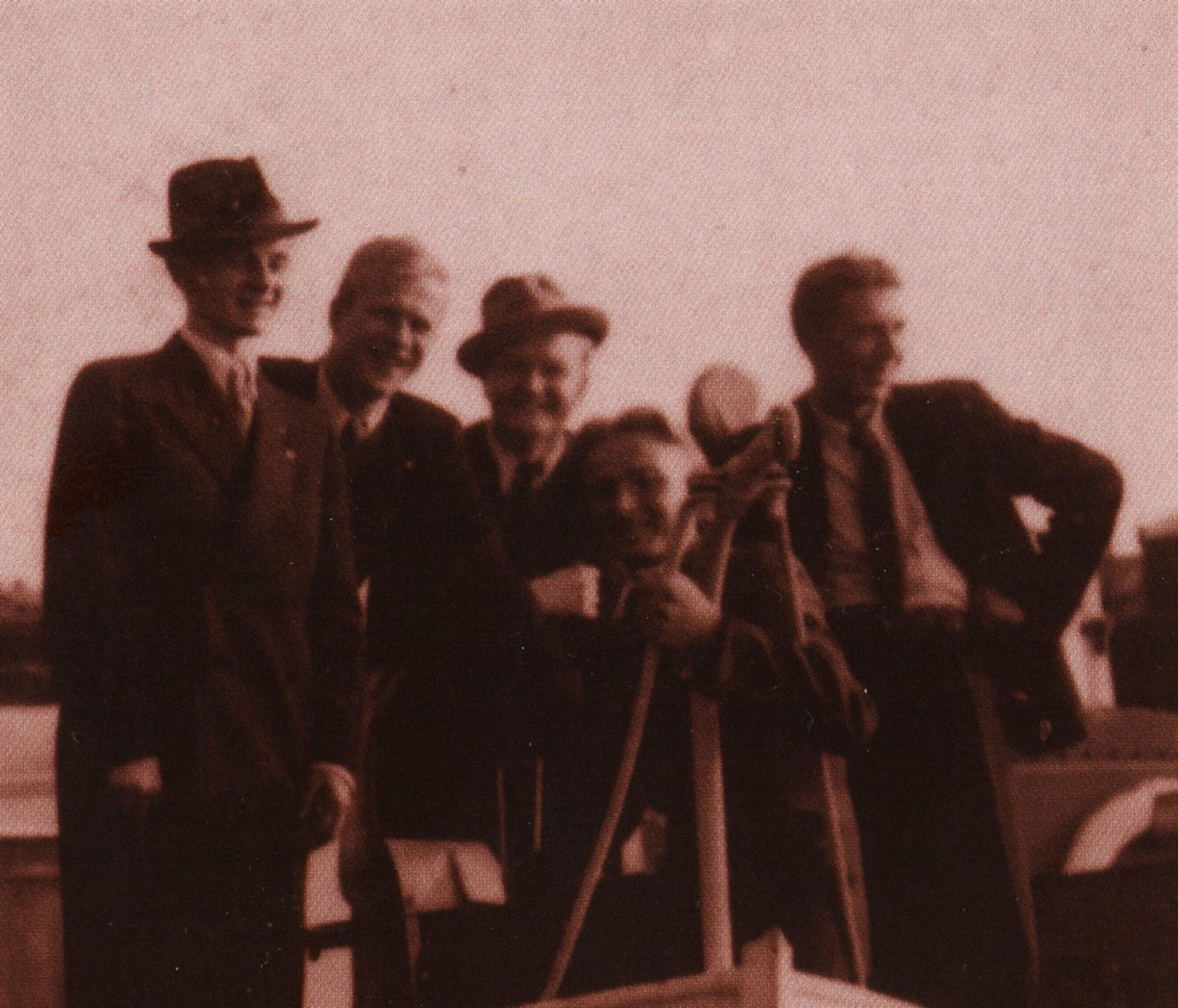
Standing from left: Algirdas Matukonis, Jurgis Dauknys, Liudas Jarošekas, Vytautas Žmuidzinas and Aleksas Paulionis

The Jarosekas Quartet was the most popular Lithuanian music group of the 1940s.

The Jarosekas Quartet was initially formed in May 1940 as an offshoot of the Kaunas University men's choir. The 2 initiating members were Liudas Jarošekas and V. Baranauskas. Also part of the initial group were J. P. Nasvytis, J. Deltuva and A. Matukonis. Shortly thereafter V. Baranauskas left the group, most likely due to conflicts between the two leaders. This was soon followed by a rapid change of the group's composition until Liudas Jarošekas, Vytautas Žmuidzinas, Algirdas Matukonis, Aleksas Paulionis and Jurgis Dauknys stabilized the group's foundation.

The first public performance took place in September 1940 in a Kaunas high school. Until August 1941 the group mainly gave concerts together with the men's choir of Kaunas University. From September 1941 up through the Soviet invasion of Lithuania in May 1944 the group gave nearly weekly live radio concerts through the main Lithuanian radio station, based in the then capital of Lithuania, Kaunas.

The group was most often accompanied by their koncertmeister Jurgis Dauknys, and they were also accompanied by the Radiofonas radio orchestra, directed by J. Lechavičius. Sometimes they had guest performers at their concerts from the Lithuanian National Theater, which included soloists - A. Kučingis, J. Mažeika, V. Jonuškaitė-Zaunienė. At times they were joined by the very popular crooner Antanas Šabaniauskas and akordeonist Četkauskas. In concerts, which took place in large halls, they were sometimes joined by the popular humorist, actor and director Stasys Čaikauskas to give the audience a pause between songs.

The group was extremely popular from their start and continued their success in Lithuania until the Soviet invasion of Lithuania towards the end of World War II. With the pending arrival of the Soviet army, Liudas Jarošekas and most of the group fled to Germany where they quickly regrouped and continued their great success until 1949. While in Germany they not only gave concerts to the Lithiuanian expat communities in Western Europe, but also concerts for general audiences in such places as the Dresden State Theater. With part of the group again reforming in the early 1950s in Chicago, they continued to give limited concerts in the United States and Canada well into the 1960s.

In the early part of their career, the songs performed were mainly in the style of popular western music of the times. As time passed, half the program was Lithuanian folk songs and patriotic songs. In their final days in Lithuania prior to the end of World War II, in their larger concerts, more complex and highly arranged songs and a few arias from operas, were included. In their period in Lithuania from 1940 - 1944 their repertoire included over 40 different songs.

== Main members of the group ==
Liudas Jarošekas - Founder and second tenor

Vytautas Žmuidzinas - Lead tenor

Algirdas Matukonis - Baritone

Aleksas Paulionis - Bass

Jurgis Dauknys - Accompanist
