= Žas =

Lithuanian musical group

Ž.A.S.
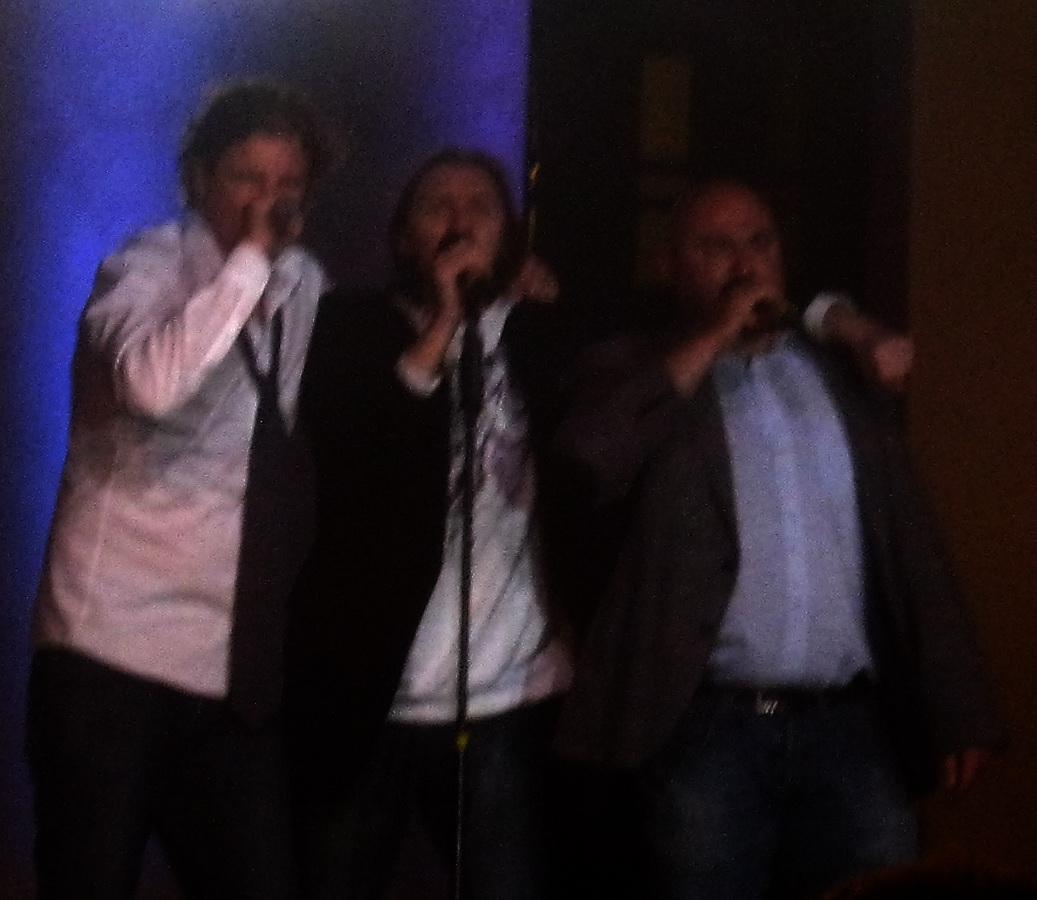
- The band's performance, circa 2012

Background information
- Origin: Vilnius, Lithuania
- Genres: Rap metal (early), Hip-hop, Gangsta rap, (early) Pop-rap, Reggae fusion, comedy hip hop, Techno, Rapcore, Funk metal (early), Sludge metal (early), Trip-hop (early), Europop (early), Funk (early)
- Works: ŽAS discography
- Years active: 1993-2008, 2012-present
- Labels: Koja, LNK, Muzikinė Partija, Intervid
- Spinoff of: Ossuary, Ghostorm, Ghoteanum, Outside, Regredior
- Members: Linas Zareckas-"Choras", Gidonas Šapiro-"Bilas", Linas Karalius-"Ezopas"
- Past members: Marius Berenis-"Tru Sabaka"; Tomas Rimkus-"Miaso"; Marius Petrukaitis; Aleksandras Kudaba; Laurynas Sadauskas
- Website: www.zas.lt

Ž.A.S. (Žiertva ant smūgio) is a Lithuanian musical group that mostly performs pop music and hip hop. The band formed out of the members of the death metal band "Regredior" and other as well, it was established in 1993 as a gangsta rap band, later they made rock and heavy metal. They currently make pop material.

The band was on a hiatus and only semi-active for 4 years, but it returned in 2012 and released a new single "Ne kažką".

Its name read as one word produces also a word similar to that of Russian užasj “terror, horror”.

== Discography ==
=== Studio albums ===
- "Ū-Žas" (released in 1996), (Koja)
- "Dozė" (released in 1997), (Koja)
- "Man dar geriau" (released in 1998), (LNK)
- "Leninas" (released in 2000)
- "Man ramu" (released in 2001)
- "Europa" (released in 2002)
- "Fortūna" (released in 2003) (promotional album for 'Eurobasket 2003')
- "Mandarinai" (released in 2004)
- "Made in China" (released in 2007)

=== Compilation albums ===
- "Geriausi" (released in 2005)

=== Singles ===
- "Ne pieną gėres ne nuo pieno ir mirsi" (released in 1996), (Koja)
- "Sudrumskime ramybę" (1997), (Koja)

=== Video clips ===
- "Ne pieną gėręs ne nuo pieno ir mirsi" (released in 1996)
- "Sudrumskime ramybę" (released in 1997)
- "Man gerai" (released in 1997)
- "Man gerai '98" (remixed version) (released in 1998)
- "Norėjau skristi" (released in 1998)
- "Tamsos vaikai" (released in 1998)
- "Eurolyga" (released in 1999) ('Euroleague 1998-1999' promotional single)
- "Po stikliuką" (released in 2000)
- "Palanga, močiučių" (released in 2002)
- "Myliu kiną" (released in 2003)
- "Fortūna" (released in 2003)
- "Tingiu" (released in 2003)
- "Mandarinai" (released in 2004)
- "Man be tavęs liūdna" (released in 2005)
- "Ne kažką" (released in 2013)
- "Ir vel tyla" (2013)
- "Silikonas" (released in 2013)
- "Tėčiai" (released in 2024)

== Videograpahy ==
- "Visa tiesa apie Ž.A.S." (released in 2005)
