= Stasys Povilaitis =

Lithuanian artist

- Born: 15 January 1947; Kaunas
- Died: 6 October 2015 (aged 68); Palanga
- Occupation: Singer/Maestro

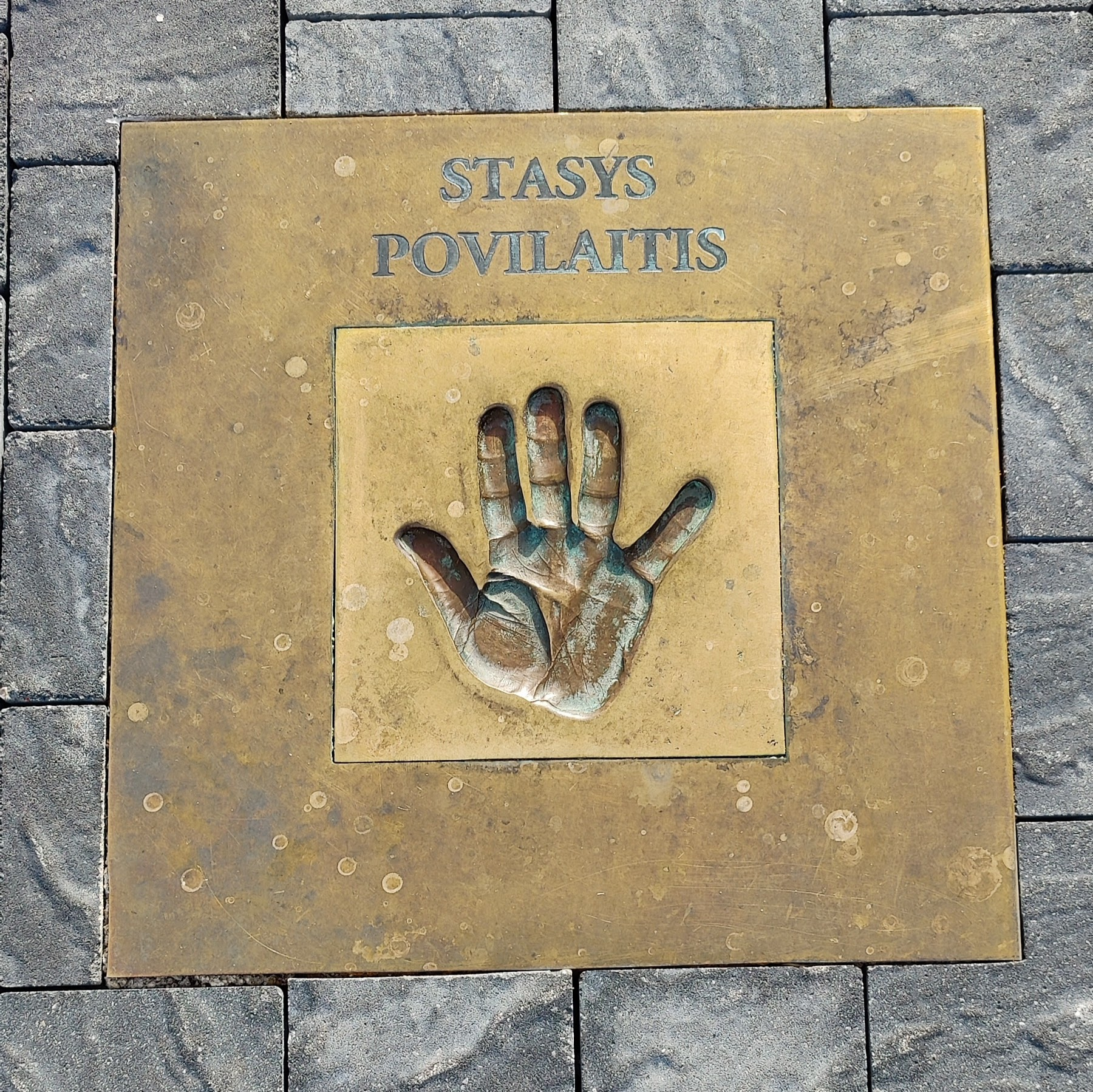
Walk of Fame in Nida: Stasys Povilaitis

Stasys Povilaitis (15 January 1947 – 6 October 2015) was a Lithuanian pop singer/maestro. He was born in Kaunas and died in Palanga.

In 2010 he started his ''TV'' career on channel ''TV3'' which was called ''Šeimų dainos'' and he was chairman of the commission.

== See also ==
- List of Lithuanian singers
