= Danielius Dolskis =

"Danielius Dolskis – Kauną linksminęs Lietuvos estrados pradininkas". lrt.lt (in Lithuanian). 2020. Danielius Dolskis (April 13, 1891 – December 3, 1931) was a popular Lithuanian singer noted in pre-revolutionary Russia and in inter-war Lithuania.

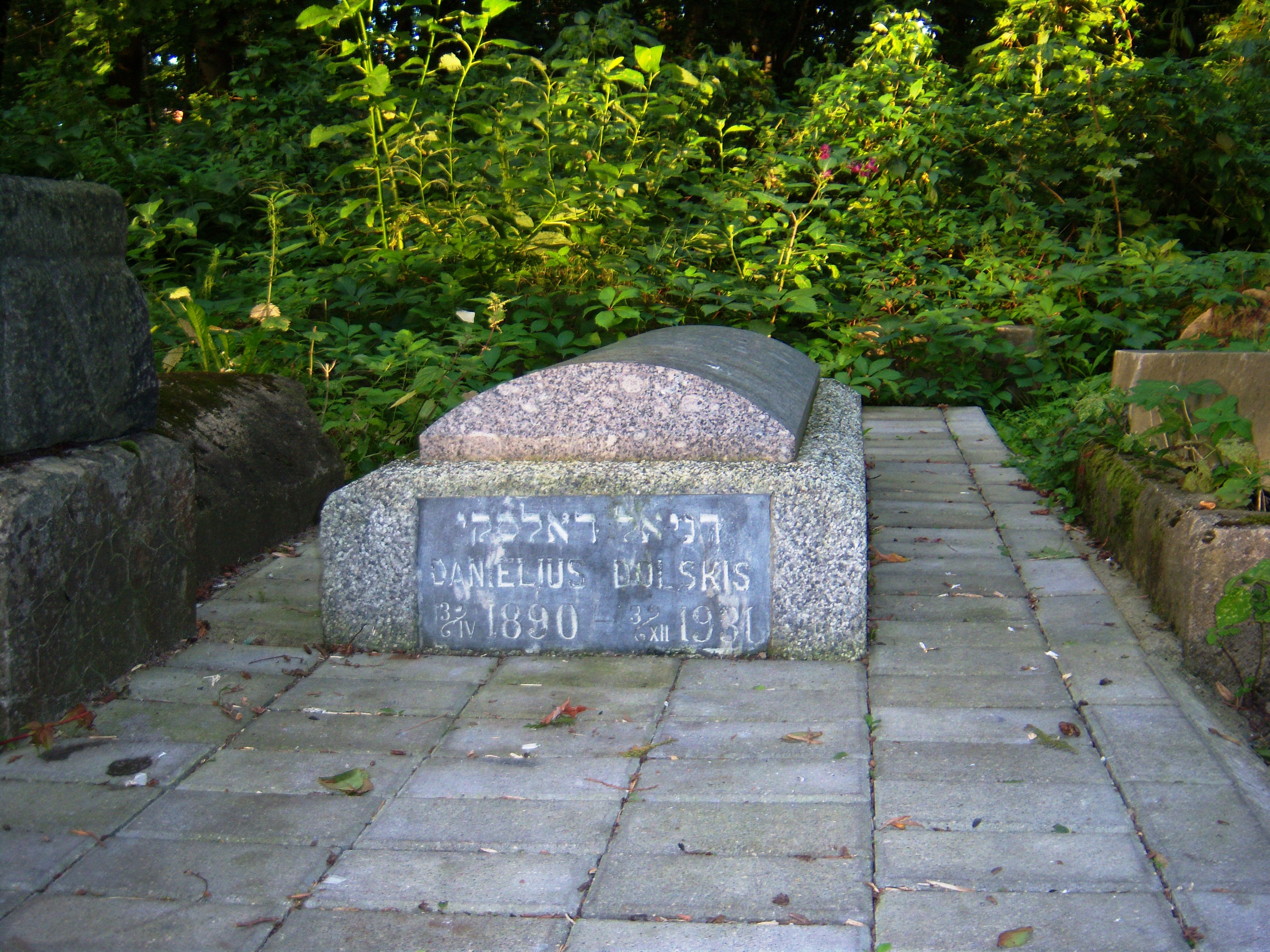

Dolskis sang in Saint Petersburg until 1917. He also performed in Moscow, Odessa, and Kiev. After the October Revolution, he moved to Riga, Latvia. In 1929, Dolskis relocated to Kaunas, Lithuania, where he continued to perform in restaurants.

In 1931, after a performance, Dolskis drank some cold beer and subsequently contracted pneumonia. He died several days later.
