= Monika Linkytė =

Lithuanian singer-songwriter (born 1992)

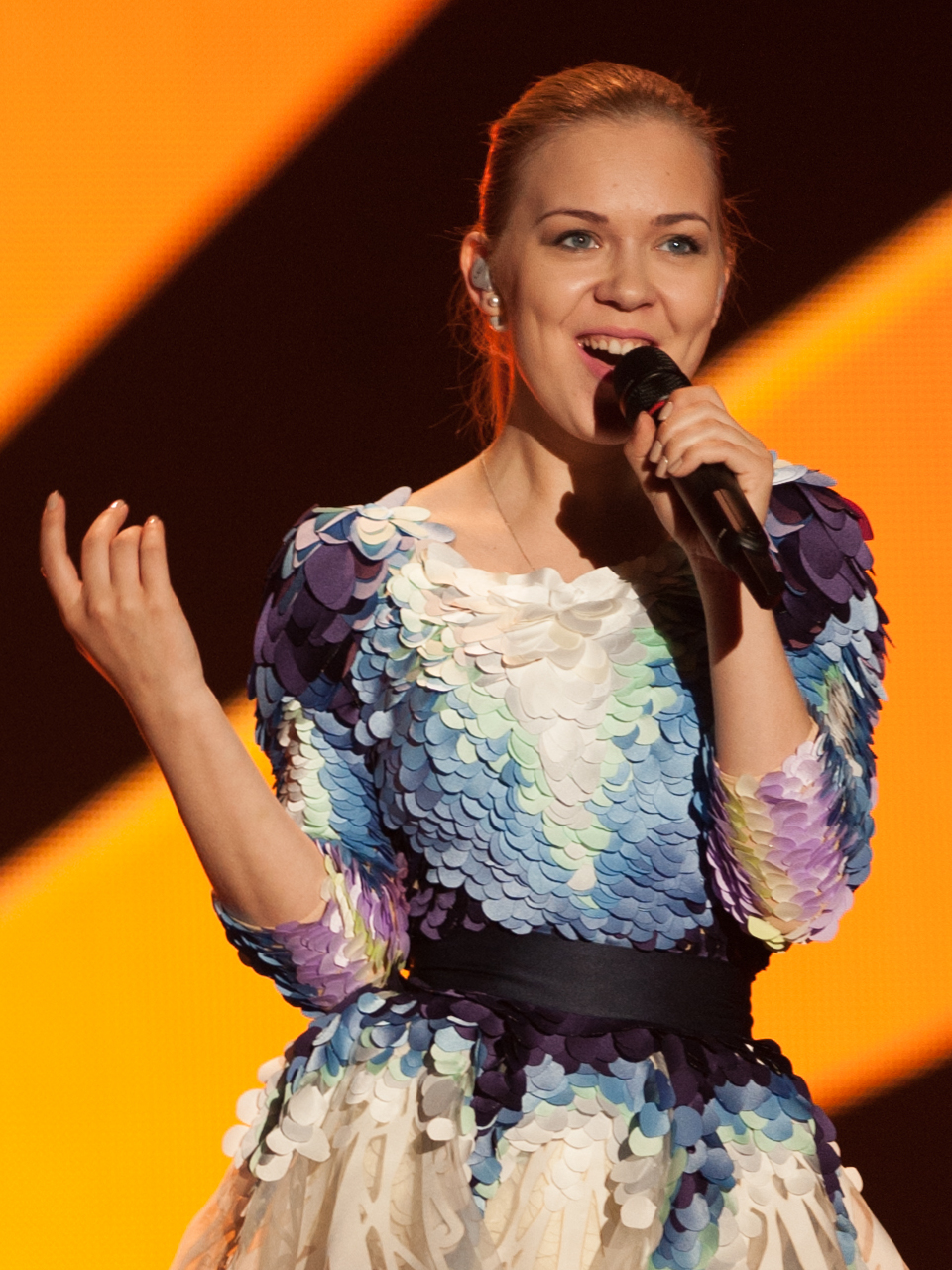
- Linkytė in 2015

Background information
- Born: 3 June 1992 (age 34); Šilutė, Lithuania
- Genres: Electropop; indie pop; electronic
- Occupations: Singer; songwriter
- Instrument: Vocals
- Years active: 2005–present

Monika Linkytė (Lithuanian: [ˈmɔnʲɪkɐ lʲɪŋˈkʲiːtʲeː]; born 3 June 1992) is a Lithuanian singer and songwriter. She represented Lithuania in the Eurovision Song Contest 2015 along with Vaidas Baumila with the song "This Time", placing 18th. She also represented Lithuania at the New Wave 2014 competition, receiving a prize from Alla Pugacheva and was a finalist in the second season of Lietuvos Balsas. She represented Lithuania again in the Eurovision Song Contest 2023 with the song "Stay", placing 11th.

Linkytė has also previously attempted to represent Lithuania in the Eurovision Song Contest in 2010, 2011, 2012, 2013, 2014, 2022, and in the Junior Eurovision Song Contest in 2007.

== Early life and education ==
Linkytė was born on 3 June 1992 in Šilutė. After completing gymnasium in Gargždai, she moved to Vilnius to attend Vilnius University, studying public health, but left after three semesters. In 2014, she began studying law at Vilnius University, but in 2016 left to study music education at BIMM University in London.

== Career ==
In 2007, Linkytė competed in the Lithuanian national selection for the Junior Eurovision Song Contest 2007 when she was 15 years old. She later returned to Eurovision in 2010 when she competed in Eurovizija 2010 with the song "Give Away". She qualified from the first semi-final and placed tenth in the final. Subsequently, she competed in Eurovizija 2011 and 2012, placing fourth and third in the finals with the songs "Days Go By" and "Happy", respectively. She went on to place second on the second season of Lietuvos Balsas, the Lithuanian version of The Voice.

After the Eurovizija national final was scrapped in favor of Eurovizijos Atranka 2013, Linkytė continued to take part, competing with the song "Baby Boy", written by Sasha Son. She was forced to withdraw from the competition following the second semi-final due to contracting laryngitis. The next year, she competed in Eurovizijos Atranka 2014 and placed fourth. After that, she represented Lithuania at the New Wave 2014 competition, taking fourth place and receiving a prize from Alla Pugacheva. The following year, she competed in Eurovizijos Atranka 2015 and also submitted the self-penned song "Skęstu" to the competition. While the song was eliminated during the sixth show, she went on to win the competition performing the song "This Time" with Vaidas Baumila. Linkytė and Baumila went on to represent Lithuania in the Eurovision Song Contest 2015 in Vienna, where they qualified from the second semi-final in seventh place, and went on to place 18th in the final with 30 points.

After Eurovision, Linkytė released the single "Po dangum", which went on to be certified platinum in Lithuania. Her debut studio album Walk with Me was released on 17 September 2015, and was also certified platinum. She went on to win Best Album for Walk with Me, Best Song for "Po dangum", and Best Female Act at the 2015 M.A.M.A. Awards, the largest music awards ceremony in Lithuania. She was nominated for Best Female Act once again at the 2016 awards.

On 18 February 2023, Linkytė won Pabandom iš naujo! 2023, Lithuania's national final, with her song "Stay", making her the country's official entrant at the Eurovision Song Contest 2023. She performed at the second semi-final on 11 May 2023, where she placed fourth and qualified for the final. Linkytė ultimately placed 11th overall, with a score of 127 points overall: 46 from the public and 81 from the juries.

== Discography ==
=== Studio albums ===
Title	Details	Certification
Walk with Me	Released: 17 September 2015; Label: Gyva Muzika; Format: Digital download, CD	LIT: Platinum

==== Extended plays ====
- Old Love (2018)
- Healing (2023)

=== Singles ===
Title	Year	Peak chart positions			Certification	Album
Title	Year	LIT	AUT	UK Down.	Certification	Album
"Give Away"	2010	—	—	—		Non-album singles
"Days Go By"	2011	—	—	—		Non-album singles
"Happy"	2012	—	—	—		Non-album singles
"Baby Boy"	2013	—	—	—		Non-album singles
"Skęstu"	2014	—	—	—		Walk with Me
"This Time" (with Vaidas Baumila)	2015	—	59	—		Walk with Me
"Po dangum"	2015	—	—	—	LIT: Platinum	Walk with Me
"Žodžių nereikia"	2015	—	—	—		Walk with Me
"Krentu žemyn"	2016	—	—	—		Walk with Me
"Padovanojau"	2016	—	—	—	LIT: Gold	Non-album singles
"Šviesõs"	2016	—	—	—		Non-album singles
"Prisimink mane"	2016	—	—	—		Non-album singles
"Leisk man pasiklyst"	2017	—	—	—		Non-album singles
"Gal tai meilė?"	2017	—	—	—		Non-album singles
"O tu?"	2018	—	—	—		Non-album singles
"Šilkas"	2020	—	—	—		Non-album singles
"Visada šalia"	2020	—	—	—		Non-album singles
"Degtukas"	2022	—	—	—		Non-album singles
"Stay"	2023	5	—	45		Healing

== Awards and nominations ==
Year	Award	Category	Work	Result	Ref
2015	M.A.M.A Awards	Best Pop Act	—	Nominated	
2015	M.A.M.A Awards	Best Album	Walk with Me	Won	
2015	M.A.M.A Awards	Best Song	Po dangum	Won	
2015	M.A.M.A Awards	Best Female Act	—	Won	
2016	M.A.M.A Awards	Best Female Act	—	Nominated	

Awards and achievements
Preceded by Vilija with "Attention"	Lithuania in the Eurovision Song Contest; 2015 (with Vaidas Baumila)	Succeeded by Donny Montell with "I've Been Waiting for This Night"
Preceded by Monika Liu with "Sentimentai"	Lithuania in the Eurovision Song Contest; 2023	Succeeded by Silvester Belt with "Luktelk"
