= Music of Lithuania =

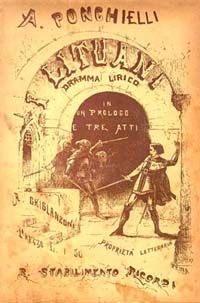
Opera I Lituani (The Lithuanians) - poster from the opera's 19th century production

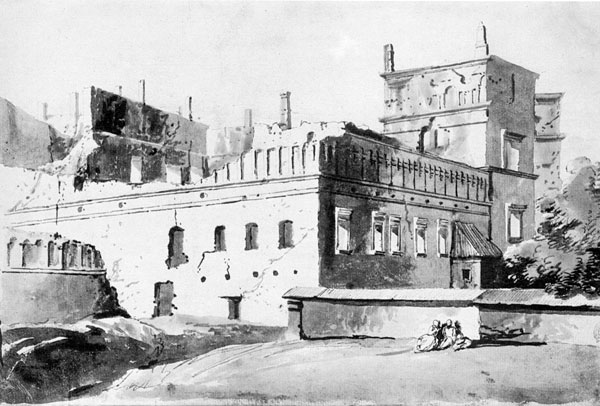
Drawing of the Palace of the Grand Dukes of Lithuania in XVIII c.

Music of Lithuania refers to all forms of music associated with Lithuania, which has a long history of the folk, popular and classical musical development. Music was an important part of polytheistic, pre-Christian Lithuania – rituals were accompanied by music instruments and singing, deeds of the heroes and those who didn't return from the war were celebrated in songs.

== History ==
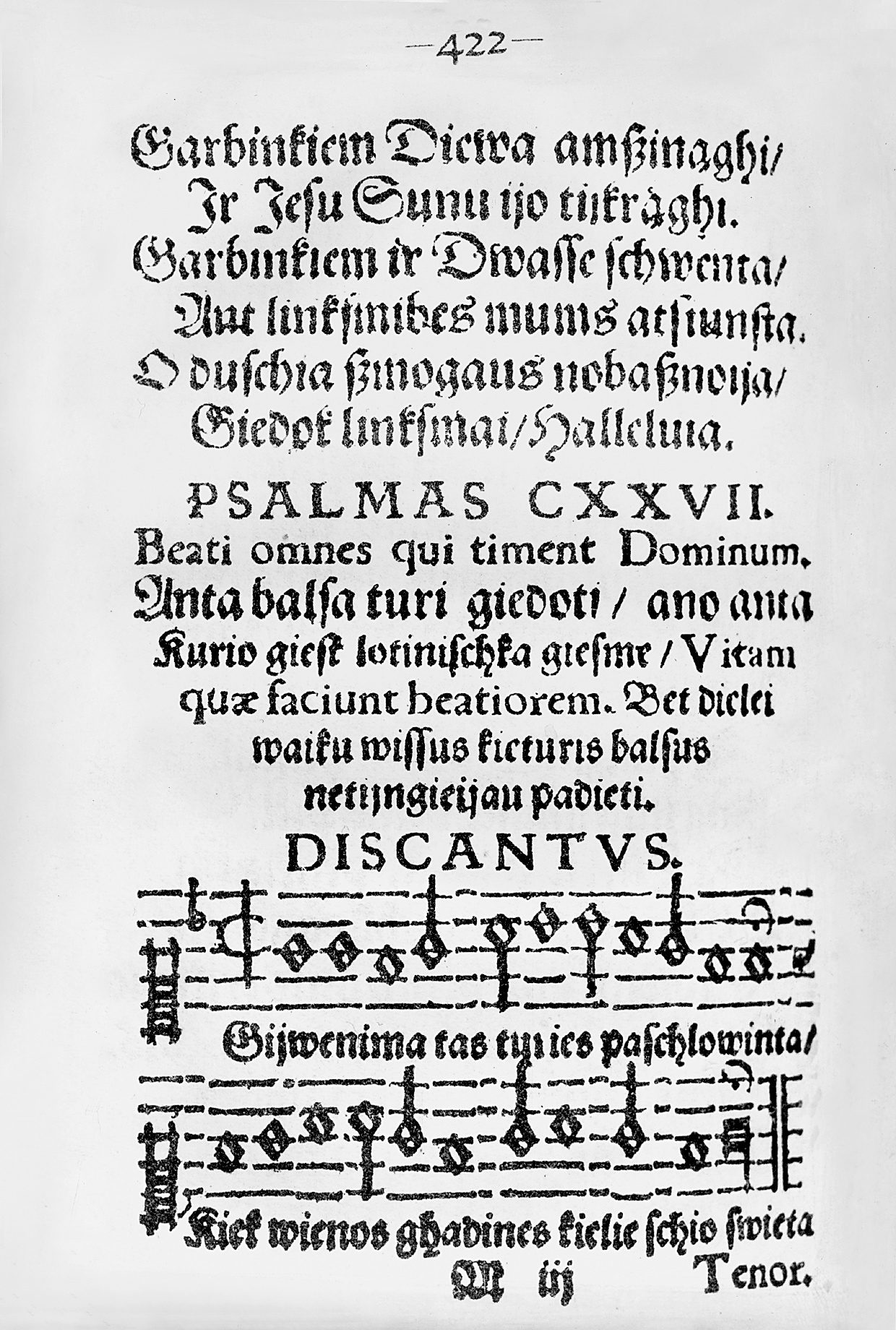
A fragment of Lithuanian psalm Gyvenimą tas turės by Martynas Mažvydas, 1570

Music was very important part of ancient Lithuanian polytheistic belief. It is known that, at the start of the 2nd millennium, Baltic tribes had special funeral traditions in which the deeds of the dead were narrated using recitation, and ritual songs about war campaigns, heroes and rulers also existed.

First professional music was introduced to Lithuania with travelling monks in the 11th century. After the christianization of Lithuania in 1387, religious music started to spread, Gregorian chant was introduced. Travelling musicians arranged concerts in the manors and castles of the Lithuanian nobleman, local cappellas were founded.

It is known, that Anna, Grand Duchess of Lithuania, wife of Vytautas the Great which had diplomatic relationships with the Teutonic Knights, who sent her expensive gifts, including clavichord and portative organ in 1408. Daughter of Grand Duke of Lithuania Gediminas, Aldona, when married to Casimir III of Poland, 1325 took her palace orchestra to Cracow. It had musicians which played lute, zither and lyre.

The first opera (Dramma per musica) in Lithuania was staged in the Palace of the Grand Dukes of Lithuania in 1636. Marco Scacchi and Virgilio Puccitelli were the opera's impresarios. The appearance of the opera in Lithuania is quite early, especially considering the fact that Italian opera phenomena was formed at about 1600 and first opera staged in Paris was just before 1650.

In the 17th century in Palace of the Grand Dukes of Lithuania, three Italian operas were staged – all by palace composer Marco Scacchi, to librettos by Virgilio Puccitelli - Il ratto d’Elena (The Elena Kidnapping) (1636), L'Andromeda (Andromeda) (1644), Circe Delusa (Disillusioned Circe) (1648). The scenography and stage machinery was made by Italian architects and engineers Agostino Locci, Bartolomeo Bolzoni and Giovanni Battista Gisleni. The cultural life of the Palace of the Grand Dukes of Lithuania was especially intense during the reign of Sigismund II Augustus. The Vilnius residence was a place to host many chamber concerts, music and dance festivities and carnivals, and music has become an integral part of the public life of the Palace. Musicians from other countries, especially from Italy, were invited to Vilnius. Among the most notable was Hungarian composer and lutenist Bálint Bakfark, who came to Vilnius from Rome, Italian composer Diomedes Cato. Composer and lutenist Michelagnolo Galilei, brother of Galileo Galilei was playing in the court of Radvila in Vilnius in the 17th century. Approximately 100 musicians worked in Vilnius at the court of Mikalojus Radvila Juodasis, the Protestant Grand Chancellor of the Grand Duchy of Lithuania and the Palatine of Vilnius (1515–1565).

First printed Lithuanian book Catechismusa Prasty Szadei (The Simple Words of Catechism) in 1547 contained 11 religious hymns in Lithuanian with sheet music. Lithuanian jesuit Žygimantas Liauksminas (Sigismundus Lauxminus) published the first music handbook in Lithuania - Ars et praxis musica in 1667. It was a first book of the trilogy, devoted to Gregorian chant - other books include Graduale pro exercitatione studentium and Antifonale ad psalmos, iuxta ritum S. Romanae Ecclesiae, decantandos, necessarium. The books were published at the University of Vilnius - S.R.M. Academicis Societatis Jesu.

Recent findings - The Sapieha Album (Sapiegos albumas) and the Kražiai Organbook (Kražių vargoninko sąsiuvinis) demonstrated that the big part of the Lithuanian church music of the 17th century was directly influenced by the most prominent composers of Italy of that time - Girolamo Frescobaldi; Italian organ tablature notation prevailed, basso continuo was studied.

Lithuania and its turbulent history was a subject of operas long before the appearance of the national opera in Lithuania. Everardo II, re di Lituania (Everardo II, King of Lithuania), music by João de Sousa Carvalho, libretto by Gaetano Martinelli was written in 1782 to celebrate the birth of Pedro III, King of Portugal. I Lituani (The Lithuanians) - is an opera consisting by Amilcare Ponchielli to an Italian libretto by Antonio Ghislanzoni, based on the historical poem Konrad Wallenrod written by Adam Mickiewicz. It premiered at La Scala in Milan on 7 March 1874.

One of the first professional Lithuanian musicians was Juozas Kalvaitis (1842-1900). He composed a four-voiced Mass in the Lithuanian language in Tilžė. In 1877, an oratorio The Creation by Joseph Haydn was translated to Lithuanian and performed in Vilnius. The first national opera Birutė by composer Mikas Petrauskas (1873-1937), libretto - Gabrielius Landsbergis-Žemkalnis (1852-1916) was staged in 1906.

Mikalojus Konstantinas Čiurlionis (1875-1911) is considered the greatest Lithuanian composer of his generation, and probably of all time.

== Folk music ==
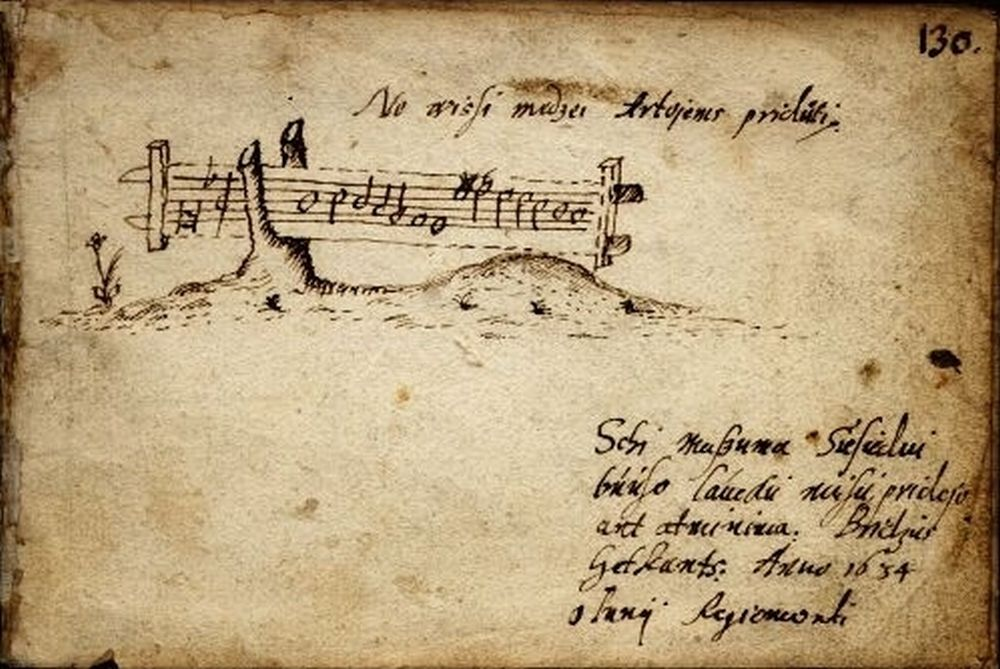
First Lithuanian folk song written down along with melody by Lithuanian engineer Fryderyk Getkant (Fridrichas - Bridžius Gedkantas) in 1634.

Lithuanian folk music belongs to Baltic music branch which is connected with Neolithic corded ware culture. In Lithuanian territory meets two musical cultures: stringed (kanklių) and wind instrument cultures. These instrumental cultures probably formed vocal traditions. Lithuanian folk music is archaic, mostly used for ritual purposes, containing elements of paganism faith.

=== Vocal music ===
There are three ancient styles of singing in Lithuania connected with ethnographical regions: monophony, multi-voiced homophony, heterophony and polyphony. Monophony mostly occurs in southern (Dzūkija), southwest (Suvalkija) and eastern (Aukštaitija) parts of Lithuania. Multi-voiced homophony, widespread in entire Lithuania, is the most archaic in Samogitia. Traditional vocal music is held in high esteem on a world scale: Lithuanian song fests and sutartinės multipart songs are on the UNESCO's representative list of the Masterpieces of the Oral and Intangible Heritage of Humanity.

==== Sutartinės (multipart songs) ====
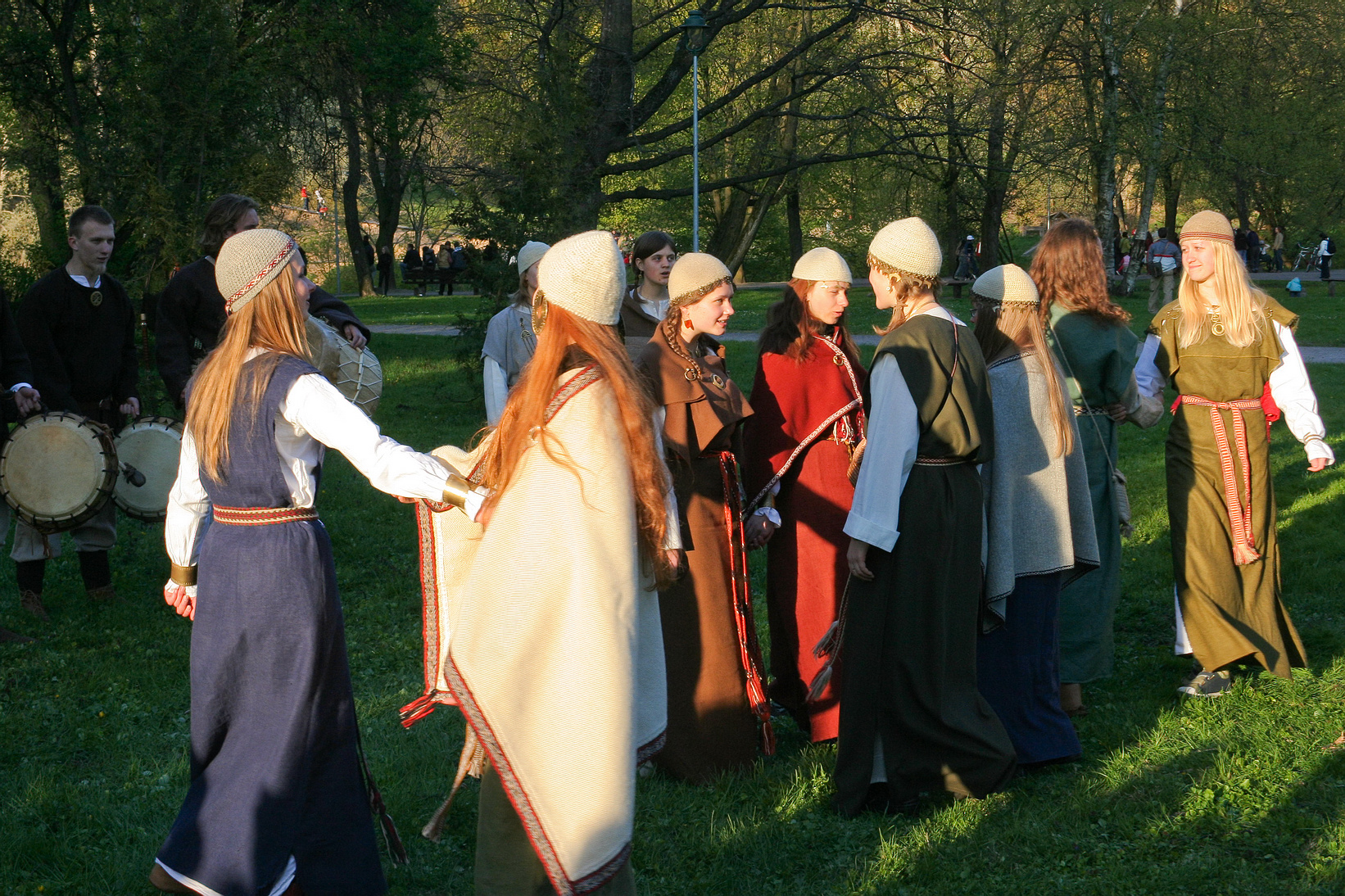
A Lithuanian folklore band Kūlgrinda dancing to a folk song in Vilnius

Sutartinės (from the word sutarti—to be in concordance, in agreement, singular sutartinė) are highly unique examples of folk music. They are an ancient form of two and three voiced polyphony, based on the oldest principles of multivoiced vocal music: heterophony, parallelism, canon and free imitation. Most of the sutartinės' repertoire was recorded in the 19th and 20th centuries, but sources from the 16th century on show that they were significant along with monophonic songs. At present the sutartinės have almost become extinct as a genre among the population, but they are fostered by many Lithuanian folklore ensembles.

The topics and functions of sutartinės encompass all major Lithuanian folk song genres. Melodies of sutartinės are not complex, containing two to five pitches. The melodies are symmetrical, consisting of two equal-length parts; rhythms are typically syncopated, and the distinctly articulated refrains give them a driving quality.

Sutartinės can be classed into three groups according to performance practices and function:

- Dvejinės (“twosomes”) are sung by two singers or two groups of singers.
- Trejinės (“threesomes”) are performed by three singers in strict canon.
- Keturinės (“foursomes") are sung by two pairs of singers.

Sutartinės are a localized phenomenon, found in the northeastern part of Lithuania. They were sung by women, but men performed instrumental versions on the kanklės (psaltery), on horns, and on the skudučiai (pan-pipes). The rich and thematically varied poetry of the sutartinės attests to their importance in the social fabric. Sutartinės were sung at festivals, gatherings, weddings, and while performing various chores. The poetic language while not being complex is very visual, expressive and sonorous. The rhythms are clear and accented. Dance sutartinės are humorous and spirited, despite the fact that the movements of the dance are quite reserved and slow. One of the most important characteristics of the sutartinės is the wide variety of vocables used in the refrains (sodauto, lylio, ratilio, tonarilio, dauno, kadujo, čiūto, etc.).

==== Wedding songs ====
Different vocal and instrumental forms developed, such as lyrical, satirical, drinking and banqueting songs, musical dialogues, wedding laments, games, dances and marches.

==== War-historical time songs ====
Chronicles and historical documents of the 13th through 16th centuries contain the first sources about songs relating the heroics of those fallen in battle against the Teutonic Knights. Later songs mention the Swedes, there are frequent references to Riga and Battle of Kircholm; songs collected in the early 19th century mention battles with the Tatars. Songs from uprisings and revolutions, as well as songs of Lithuanian anti-Soviet guerrilla resistance in 1945-1952 and songs of the deportees are also classified as wartime historical songs.

==== Calendar cycle and ritual songs ====
They were sung at prescribed times of the year while performing the appropriate rituals. There are songs of Shrovetide and Lent, Easter swinging songs, and Easter songs called lalavimai. The Advent songs reflect the mood of staidness and reflection. Christmas songs contain vocables such as kalėda, lėliu kalėda; oi kalėda kalėdzieka, while Advent songs contain vocables such as leliumoj, aleliuma, aleliuma rūta, aleliuma loda and others. There are several typical melodic characteristics associated with Christmas ritual songs, such as a narrow range, three-measure phrases, dance rhythms, a controlled slow tempo, and a tonal structure based on phrygian, mixolydian or aeolian tetrachords. Polyphonic St. John's Feast songs are commonly called kupolinės, which include refrains and vocables such as kupolėle kupolio, kupolio kupolėlio, or kupole rože.

==== Work songs ====
Work songs vary greatly in function and age. There are some very old examples, which have retained their direct relation with the rhythm and process of the work to be done. Later work songs sing more of a person's feelings, experiences and aspirations. The older work songs more accurately relate the various stages of the work to be done. They are categorized according to their purpose on the farm, in the home, and so on.

- Herding songs. Shepherd songs are sung by children, while nightherding songs are sung by adults. The shepherding songs reflect the actual tending of animals, the social situation of children, as well as references to ancient beliefs. The raliavimai or warbles are also recitative type melodies, distinguished by the vocable ralio, which is meant to calm the animals. The raliavimai have no set poetic or musical form being free recitatives, unified by the refrains. Some warbles end in a prolonged ululation, based on a major or minor third.
- Haymaking songs. Refrains are common in haymaking songs. The most common vocable used is valio, hence — valiavimas, the term for the singing of haymaking songs. The vocable is sung slowly and broadly, evoking the spacious fields and the mood of the haymaking season. The melodies of earlier origin are similar to other early work songs while more modern haymaking songs have a wider modal range and are structurally more complex. Most are in major and are homophonic.
- Rye harvesting songs. The harvesting of rye is the central stage in the agricultural cycle. The mood is doleful and sad, love and marriage are the prevailing topics in them. Family relationships between parents and children are often discussed, with special emphasis on the hard lot of the daughter-in law in a patriarchal family. Rye harvesting songs have rhythmic and tonal structures in common, which attests to their antiquity. Their unique melodic style is determined by close connection to ritual and the function of the work. The modal-tonal structure of some of these songs revolves around a minor third, while others are built on a major tetrachord.
- Oat harvesting, flax and buckwheat pulling and hemp gathering songs. Oat harvesting songs sing of the lad and the maid, of love and marriage as well as the work process: sowing, harrowing, cultivating, reaping, binding, stacking, transporting, threshing, milling, and even eating. In addition to the monophonic oat harvesting songs of Dzūkija, there are quite a few sutartinės from northern Aukštaitija, which are directly related to the job of growing oats.
- Milling songs. The genre can be identified by characteristic refrains and vocables, such as zizui malui, or malu malu. They suggest the hum of the millstones as well as the rhythm of the milling. Milling was done by women, and the lyrics are about women's life and family relationships, as well as the work itself. Milling songs are slow tempo, composed, the melodic rhythm varies little.
- Spinning and weaving songs. In spinning songs the main topic is the spinning itself, the spinner, and the spinning wheel while weaving songs mention the weaving process, the weaver, the loom, and the delicate linens. Some spinning songs are cheerful and humorous, while others resemble the milling songs which bemoan the woman's hard lot and longing for her home and parents. The texts describe the work process, while the refrains mimic the whirring of the spinning wheel. There are also highly unique spinning sutartinės, typified by clear and strict rhythms.
- Laundering songs. Sometimes the refrain imitates the sounds of the beetle and mangle — the laundering tools. The songs often hyperbolyze images of the mother-in-law's outlandish demands, such as using the sea instead of a beetle, and the sky in place of a mangle, and the treetops for drying.
- Fishing and hunting songs. Fishing songs are about the sea, the bay, the fisherman, his boat, the net, and they often mention seaside place names, such as Klaipėda or Rusnė. The emotions of young people in love are often portrayed in ways that are unique only to fishing songs. The monophonic melodies are typical of singing traditions of the seaside regions of Lithuania. Hunting motifs are very clearly expressed in hunting songs.
- Berry picking and mushroom gathering songs. These are singular songs. Berry picking songs describe young girls picking berries, meeting boys and their conversations. Mushroom gathering songs can be humorous, making light of the process of gathering and cooking the mushrooms, describing the "war" of the mushrooms or their "weddings."

=== Instrumental music ===
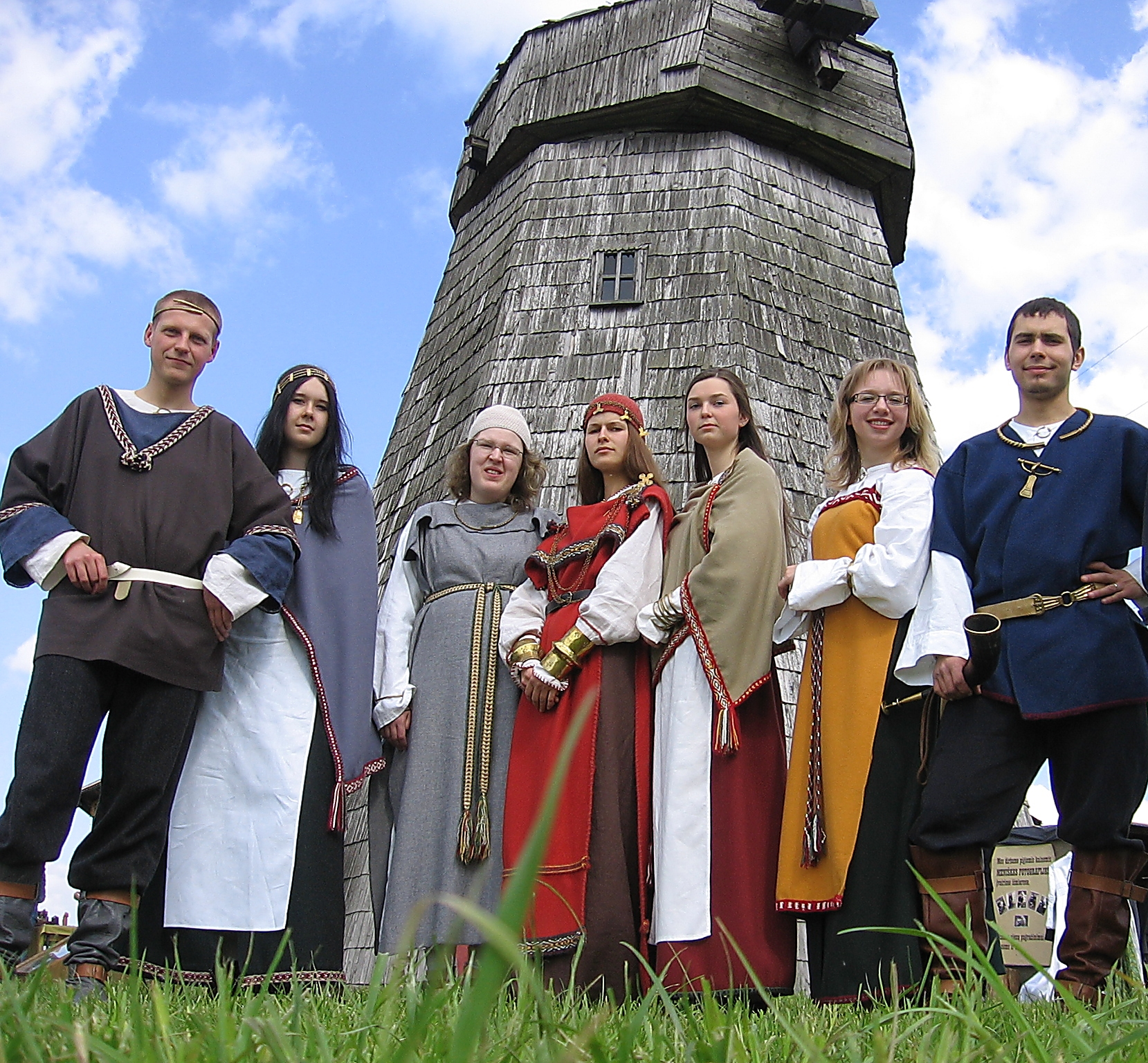
Vaiguva, a Lithuanian folklore band

The rateliai (round dances) have long been a very important part of Lithuanian folk culture, traditionally performed without instrumental accompaniment. Since the 19th century, however, fiddle, basetle, lamzdeliai and kanklės came to accompany the dances, while modern groups also incorporate bandoneon, accordion, concertina, mandolin, clarinet, cornet, guitar and harmonica. During the Soviet occupation, dance ensembles used box kanklės and a modified clarinet called the birbynės; although the ensembles were ostensibly folk-based, they were modernized and sanitized and used harmonized and denatured forms of traditional styles.

The most important Lithuanian popular folk music ensembles included Skriaudžių kanklės, formed in 1906, and Lietuva. Such ensembles were based on traditional music, but were modernized to be palatable to the masses; the early 20th century also saw the spread of traditional musical plays like The Kupiškėnai Wedding.

Some of the most prominent modern village ensembles: Marcinkonys (Varėna dst.), Žiūrai (Varėna dst.), Kalviai-Lieponys (Trakai dst.), Luokė (Telšiai dst.), Linkava (Linkuva, Pakruojis dst.), Šeduviai (Šeduva, Radviliškis dst.), Užušiliai (Biržai dst.), Lazdiniai-Adutiškis (Švenčionys dst.). Some of the most prominent town folklore groups: Ratilio, Ūla, Jievaras, Poringė (Vilnius), Kupolė (Kaunas), Verpeta (Kaišiadorys), Mėguva (Palanga), Insula (Telšiai), Gastauta (Rokiškis), Kupkiemis (Kupiškis), Levindra (Utena), Sūduviai (Vilkaviškis). Children folk groups: Čiučiuruks (Telšiai), Kukutis (Molėtai), Čirulis (Rokiškis), Antazavė (Zarasai dst.).

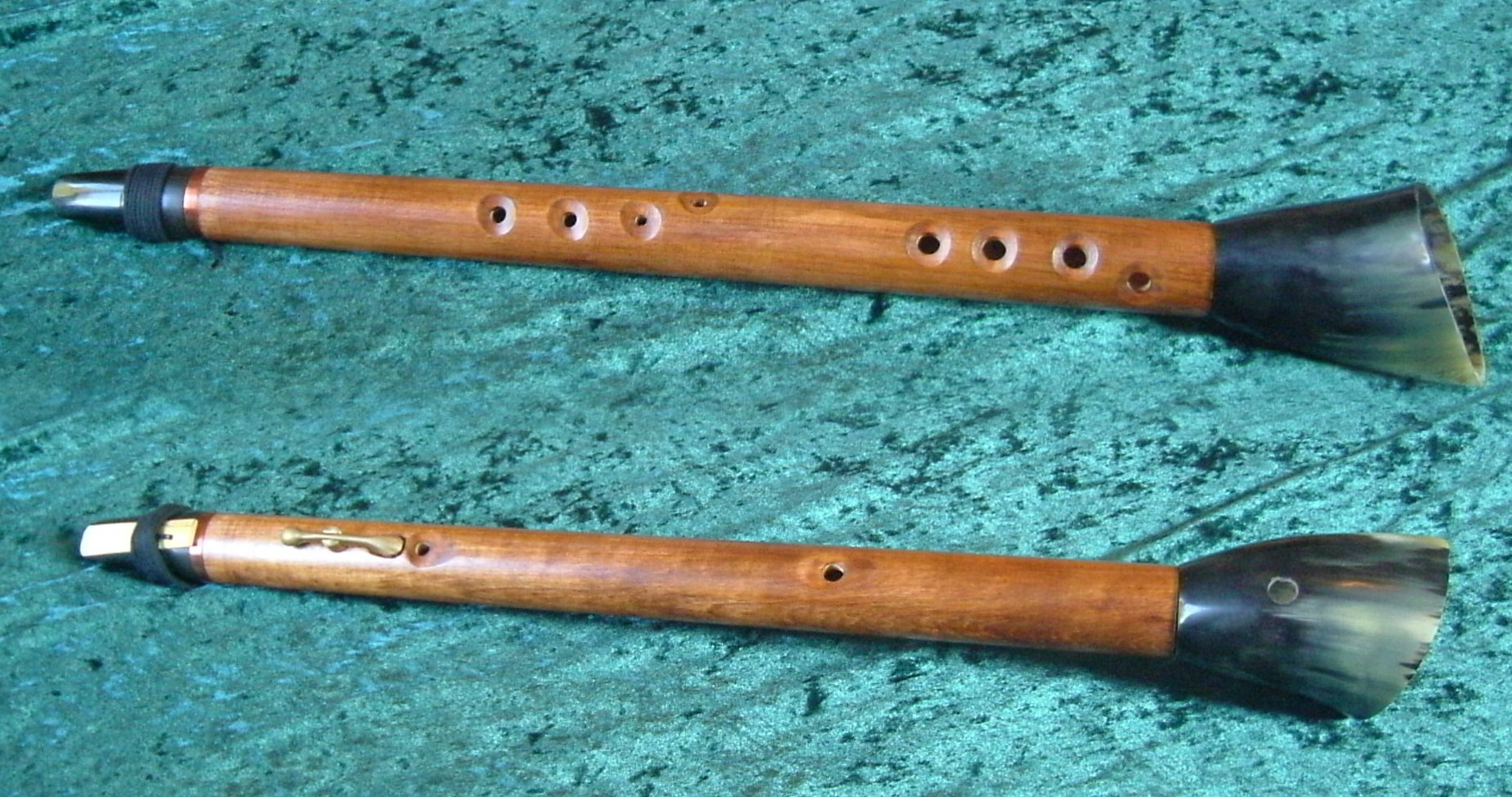
Birbynė

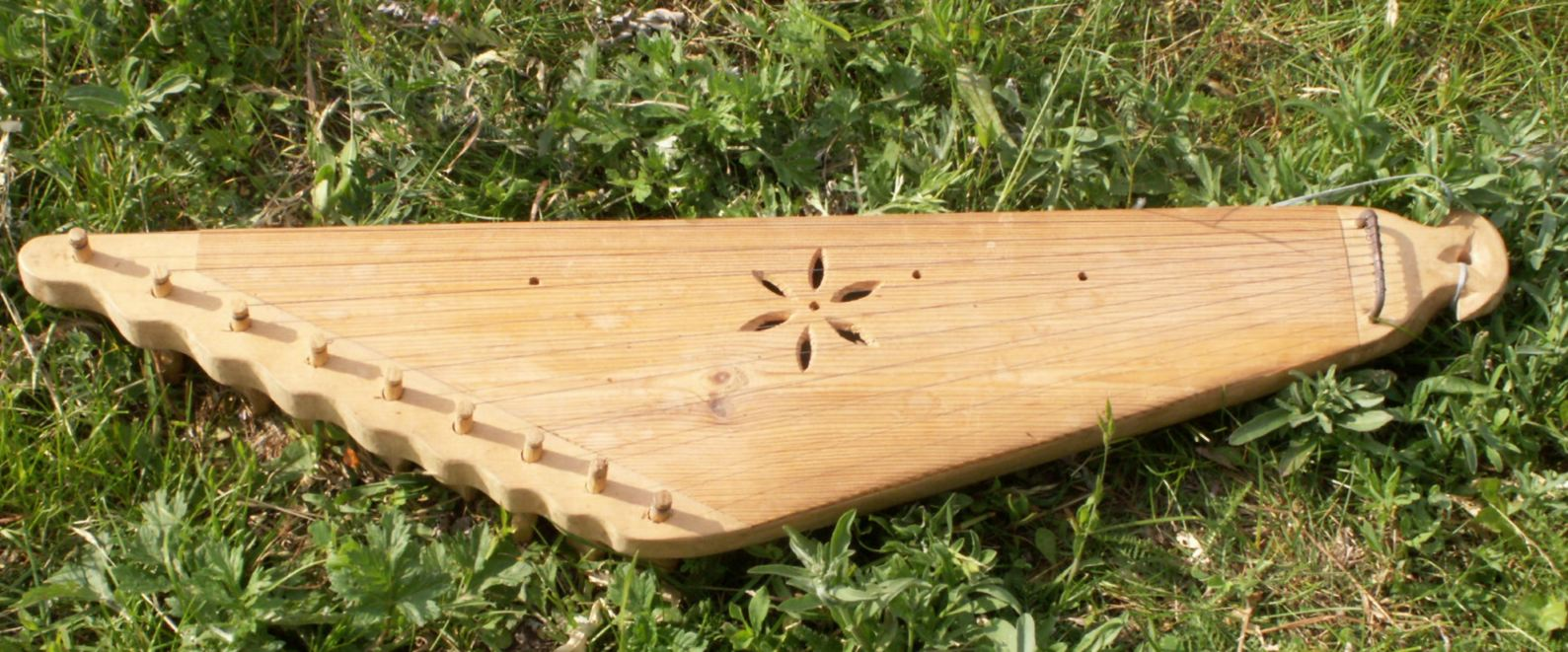
Kanklės

Skrabalai

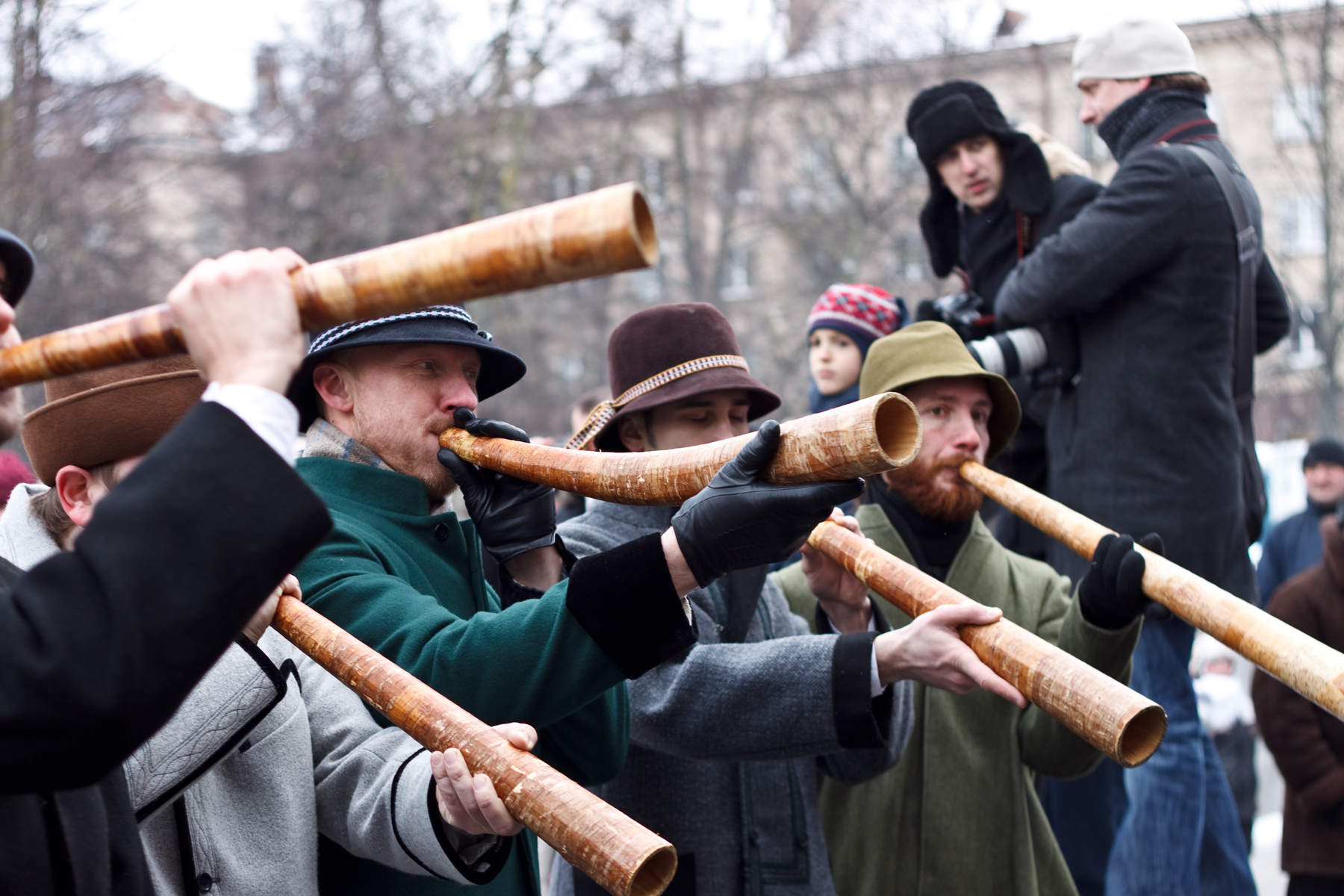
Dūda

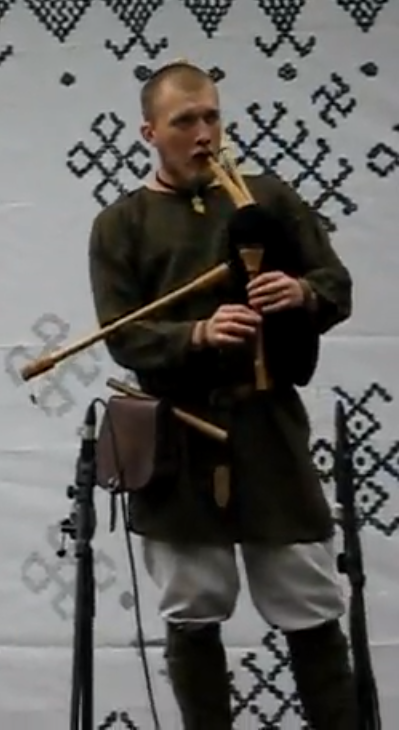
Dūdmaišis (Lithuanian bagpipe)

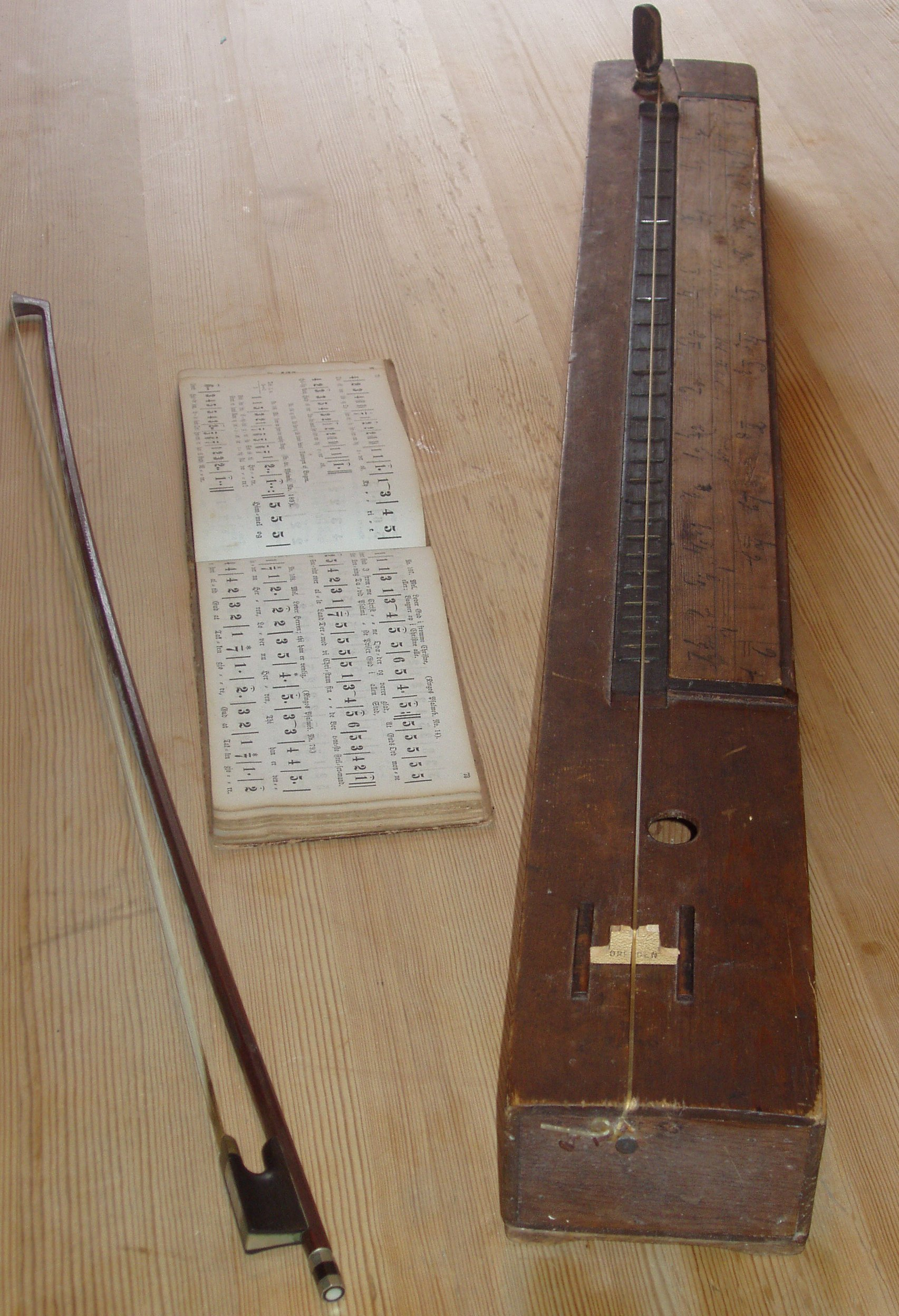
Psalmodikon

Zurna

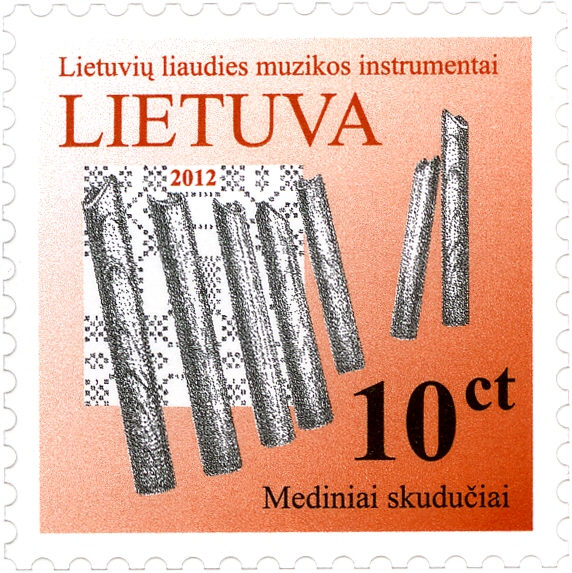
Skudučiai on a Lithuanian stamp
Lithuanian national instruments

== Classical music ==
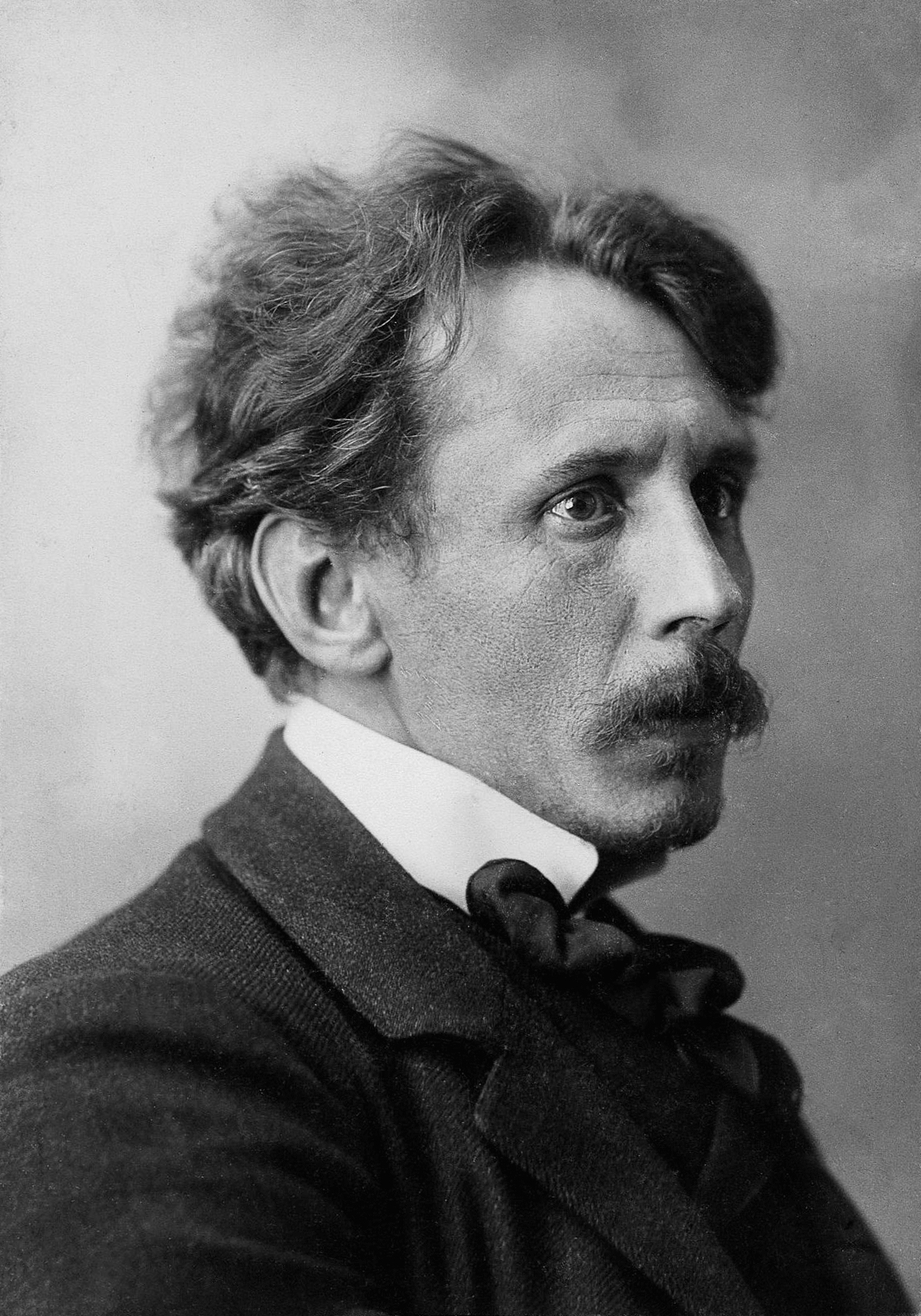
Mikalojus Konstantinas Čiurlionis

Mikalojus Konstantinas Čiurlionis (22 September [O.S. 10 September] 1875 in Varėna—10 April [O.S. 28 March] 1911 in Pustelnik near Warsaw) was a Lithuanian painter and composer. During his short life he created about 200 pieces of music. His works have had profound influence on modern Lithuanian culture.

Čiurlionis studied piano and composition at the Warsaw Conservatory (1894–1899). Later he attended composition lectures at the Leipzig Conservatory (1901–1902). His symphonic poems In the Forest (Miške) and The Sea (Jūra) were performed only posthumously.

The Čiurlionis String Quartet performs in Lithuania and abroad. Every several years junior performers from Lithuania and neighbouring countries take part in The Čiurlionis Competition.

Modern classical composers emerged in seventies - Bronius Kutavičius, Feliksas Bajoras, Osvaldas Balakauskas, Onutė Narbutaitė, Vidmantas Bartulis and others. Most of those composers explored archaic Lithuanian music and its harmonic combination with modern minimalism and neoromanticism.

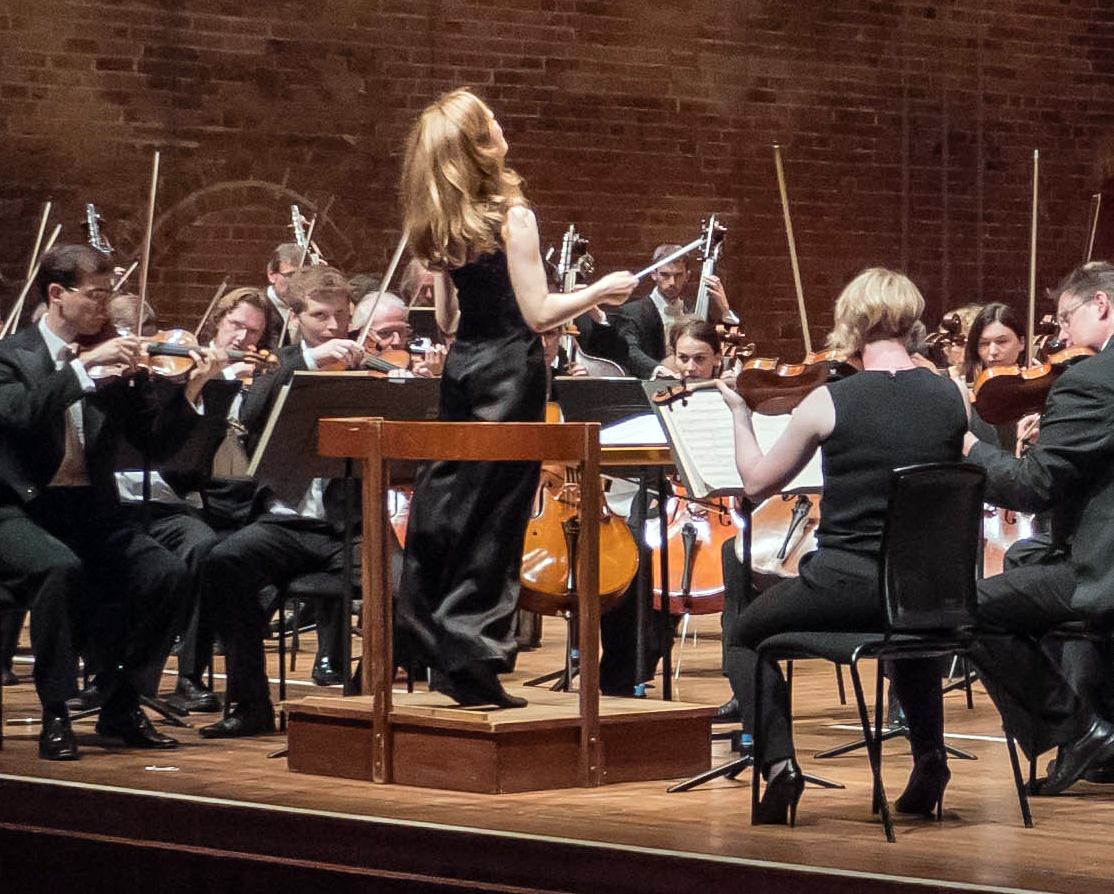
Mirga Gražinytė-Tyla conducting the City of Birmingham Symphony Orchestra at the Aldeburgh Festival in 2017

Osvaldas Balakauskas (born 1937, Miliūnai) Graduated from the Vilnius Pedagogical Institute in 1961, attended Boris Lyatoshinsky's composition class at Kiev Conservatory in 1969. From 1992 to 1994 Balakauskas was ambassador of Lithuania and in 1996 he was awarded with the Lithuanian National Award, the highest artistic and cultural distinction in Lithuania. He is currently head of the Composition Department of the Lithuanian Academy of Music and Theatre. His output consists of symphonies, concertos, chamber and instrumental music.

Mirga Gražinytė-Tyla is the conductor and music director of City of Birmingham Symphony Orchestra.

The New Ideas Chamber Orchestra NICO and Synaesthesis playing new academic music.

In 1996 Music Information Centre Lithuania (MICL) was founded. It collects, promotes and shares information on Lithuanian musical culture.

- Bronius Kutavičius
- Juozas Gruodis
- Vidmantas Bartulis
- Vytautas Barkauskas
- Jeronimas Kačinskas
- Giedrius Kuprevičius
- Vytautas Bacevičius
- Šarūnas Nakas
- lt:Justė Janulytė
- Ričardas Kabelis
- Rytis Mažulis
- Faustas Latėnas
- Onutė Narbutaitė

== Opera ==
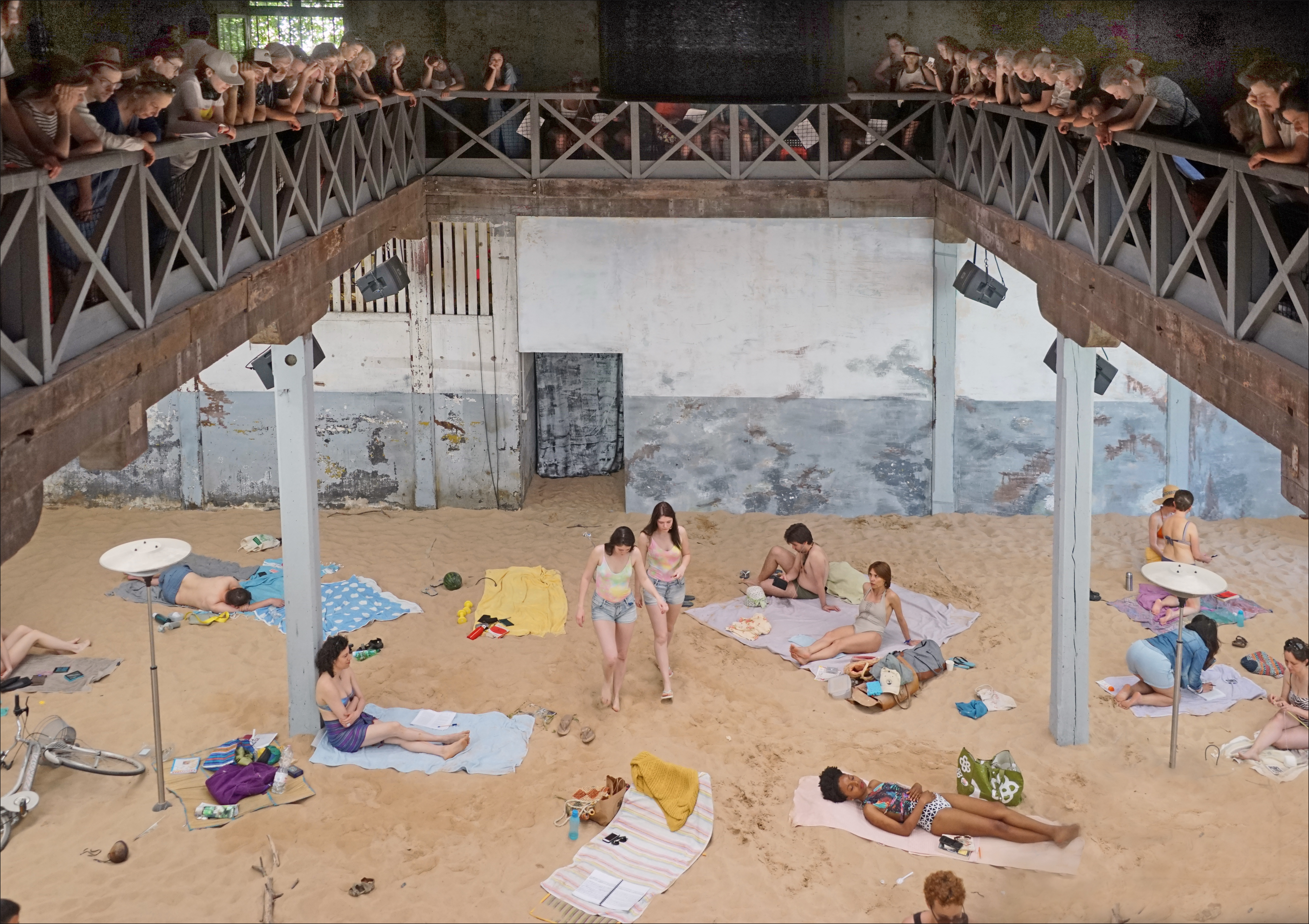
Opera performance Sun & Sea (Marina) at 2019 Venice Biennale

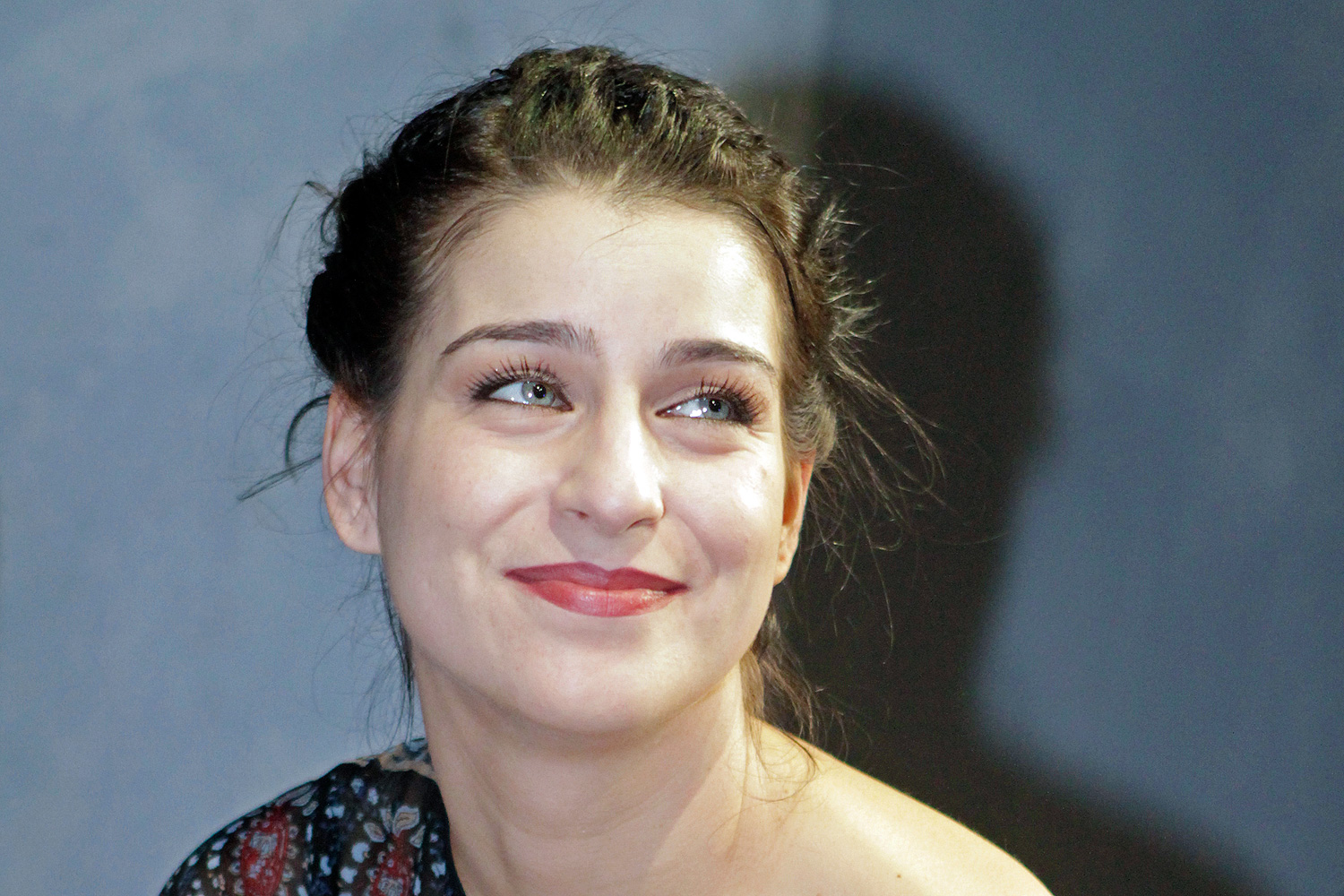
Asmik Grigorian - Lithuanian operatic soprano. Winner of International Opera Award as the best female singer of 2019

Although the first opera in Lithuania was staged just 30 years later after it appeared in Italy, the musical and cultural development was constantly interrupted with historical turmoils. The Russian invasion in 1655 was especially grueling - many manors were destroyed, Vilnius was looted and demolished. The war with Sweden was started as well. The period was called Tvanas (The Deluge). Eventually it led to a partition of Polish–Lithuanian Commonwealth.

In 1785 in Vilnius was the first city theatre created, which hosted operas as well. Musical life continued in the saloons of the aristocrats and nobleman. The house of singer Kristina Gerhardi-Frank and physician Joseph Frank and Müller's house, where Stanisław Moniuszko was making his musical performances, were especially well known in Vilnius.

Development of national Lithuanian opera is related with national revival in the 20th century. Themes of the operas were taken from the national history or mythology. Lithuanian language was considered as language of singing. First Lithuanian national opera Birutė by composer Mikas Petrauskas was staged in 1906 in Vilnius City Concert Hall. After regaining the Independence of Lithuania in 1918 opera Gražina (1933) by composer Jurgis Karnavičius (1884 - 1941) was the first staged in a new Kaunas State Musical Theatre. It was followed in 1937 by the next opera of J.Karnavičius Radvila Perkūnas.

In Boston in 1924 Lithuanian emigrants music lovers staged opera by M.Petrauskas Eglė žalčių karalienė (Eglė the Queen of Serpents). Vytautas Klova (1926 - 2006) created mostly national operas - (Pilėnai 1955, Vaiva 1957, Duktė (The Daughter) 1960, Du kalavijai (Two Swords) 1965, Amerikietiškoji tragedija (An American Tragedy), 1968, Ave vita, 1974). Operas based on historical thematic were created by Julius Juzeliūnas (1916 - 2001) (Sukilėliai (The Rebels) 1957, banned by soviet censorship, staged only in 1977), B. Dvarionas (Dalia, 1958).

Bronius Kutavičius wrote operas Kaulo senis ant geležinio kalno (The Old Man of Bone on the Iron Hill, 1976), Strazdas – žalias paukštis (Thrush, the Green Bird, 1981), Lokys (The Bear, 2000), Ignes et fides (Fire and Faith, 2003), combining opera, ballet and oratorio.

Most notable Lithuanian opera singers: Kipras Petrauskas (1885 - 1968), Virgilijus Noreika (1935 - 2018), Vaclovas Daunoras (b. 1937), Irena Milkevičiūtė (b. 1947), Violeta Urmana (b. 1961). Other singers performing on international scenes are: Aušrinė Stundytė, Asmik Grigorian, Vaidas Vyšniauskas (Kristian Benedikt), Edgaras Montvidas, Justina Gringytė, Indre Viskontas. Liudas Truikys (1904 - 1987) was a renowned scenic designer. Prominent theatre director Eimuntas Nekrošius has staged several operas in Lithuania (Otello) and Italy (Macbeth). Fashion designer Juozas Statkevičius (b. 1968) created costumes for numerous operas.

The diversity of the modern national opera is represented by: Lokys (The Bear, 2000), Geros dienos (Have a Godd Day!, 2011), Cornet (2014), Post Futurum (2018), Prūsai (The Prussians, 2018). Modern opera Sun & Sea (Marina) (2019) was presented at Venice Biennale, Lithuanian pavilion and was awarded The Golden Lion for best national participation.

Currently operas are staged in Lithuanian National Opera and Ballet Theatre, Vilnius City Opera, Kaunas State Musical Theatre, Klaipėda State Musical Theatre and by company Operomanija and by Lithuanian Opera Company of Chicago. Opera is a highly popular genre in Lithuania, collecting full halls. The annual NOA (New Opera Action) - contemporary alternative opera and multidisciplinary art festival is being organized in Vilnius.

== Musicals ==
In 1971, despite being behind the Iron Curtain in Soviet occupied Lithuania Kęstutis Antanėlis has staged the rock opera Jesus Christ Superstar - just one year after its album release. In 1973 director Arūnas Žebriūnas, composer Vyacheslav Ganelin, and poet Sigitas Geda created Velnio nuotaka (Devil's bride), the first Lithuanian musical film. In 1974 the first Lithianian theatre musical Ugnies medžioklė su varovais (Fire Hunt with Beaters) (composer - Giedrius Kuprevičius, libretto - Saulius Šaltenis, Liudas Jacinevičius) was staged.

== Choral music ==
In Lithuania choral music is very important. Only in Vilnius city there are three choirs laureates at the European Grand Prix for Choral Singing. Vytautas Miškinis (born 1954) is a composer and choir director who is very popular in Lithuania and abroad. He has written over 400 secular and about 150 religious works.

== Rock music ==
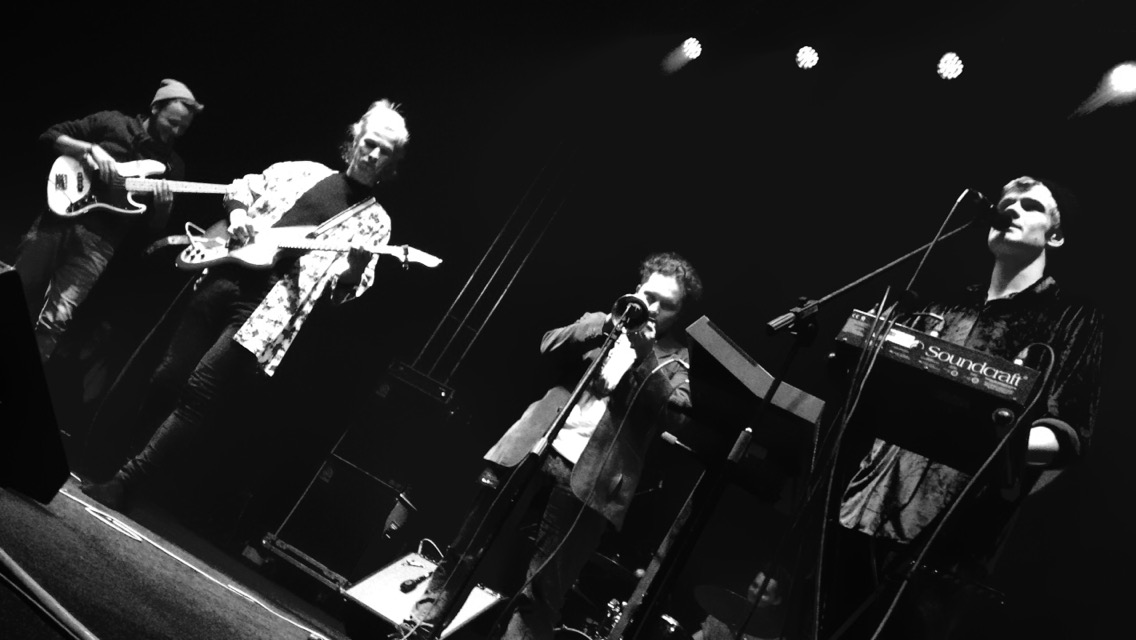
Garbanotas Bosistas (The Curly Bassist)

The Communist government of the Lithuanian SSR criticized rock music, which was considered a decadent and corrupting cultural invasion from the West. The first local rock bands started to emerge around 1965 and included Kertukai, Aitvarai and Nuogi ant slenksčio (Naked On A Threshold) in Kaunas, and Kęstutis Antanėlis, Vienuoliai (The Monks), and Gėlių Vaikai (Flower Childs) in Vilnius, among others.

Radio Luxembourg was the most important source of information about the music on other side of the Iron Curtain. It was very common for Lithuanian hippies or band players to listen to this radio. Radio Luxemburg bears strong associations in Lithuania with the Romas Kalanta generation (Kalantos karta). Another means was to smuggle LPs of popular Western bands into Lithuania and copy them onto magnetic tape. The records then spread further by making recordings to the friends, classmates.

Unable to express their opinions directly, the Lithuanian artists began organizing patriotic Roko Maršai and were using metaphors in their songs' lyrics, which were easily identified for their true meanings by the locals. Postmodernist rock band Antis and its vocalist Algirdas Kaušpėdas were one of the most active performers who mocked the Soviet regime by using metaphors. For example, in the song Zombiai (Zombies), the band indirectly sang about the Red Army soldiers who occupied the state and its military base in Ukmergė. Vytautas Kernagis' song Kolorado vabalai (Colorado beetles) was also a favorite due to its lyrics in which true meaning of the Colorado beetles was intended to be the Soviets decorated with the Ribbons of Saint George.

In the early independence years, rock band Foje was particularly popular and gathered tens of thousands of spectators to the concerts. After disbanding in 1997, Foje vocalist Andrius Mamontovas remained one of the most prominent Lithuanian performers and an active participant in various charity events. Marijonas Mikutavičius is famous for creating unofficial Lithuania sport anthem Trys milijonai (Three million) and official anthem of the EuroBasket 2011 Nebetyli sirgaliai (English version was named Celebrate Basketball).

In the 1980s, rock bands Foje, Antis, and Bix made a big impact in Lithuania. Short-lived alternative rock group Šiaurės kryptis (The Northern Direction, 1986 - 1995) issued only one album Netiekto, but still considered one of the best groups of that time.

In 1987, 1988 and 1989 Lithuania saw several big rock festivals, such as Roko Maršas (Rock March). Roko Maršas was connected to the ideology of Sąjūdis and independence movement of Lithuania.

- Žalvarinis
- Antis
- Garbanotas Bosistas
- Bix
- Skylė
- Atalyja
- Ba.
- Hiperbolė

=== Punk rock ===
1986–1987 marked the appearance of the punk scene in Lithuania. Bands like Už Tėvynę (For the Fatherland), Genocidas Raudonajam Interventui (A Genocide for The Red Intervents), SKAT, and Erkė maiše were leaning towards the classic punk rock of the 1970s, while others like 33% kiaulių pakeliui į Vatikaną and Turboreanimacija were more inclined towards hardcore punk (HC) stylistics. Turboreanimacija can be regarded as the most influential hardcore punk band of Lithuania, which in its time was well received by fanzines such as Maximumrocknroll in the United States. Their first up-tempo albums reminded listeners of early records from Scottish hardcore punk legends The Exploited, while later Turboreanimacija embarked on the power-punk road. Turboreanimacija disbanded in 1997 after granting a cult status among the Lithuanian underground. Post-punk group Kardiofonas (1986-1989) was highly popular with its hit Kalėdinė eglutė (Christmas tree).

More recent acts of this genre are ska-punk band Dr.Green (who are famous for their numerous DIY activities and intensive touring through the punk scenes of Europe), street-punkers Toro Bravo and hardcorists Bora and Mountainside.

== Pop music ==
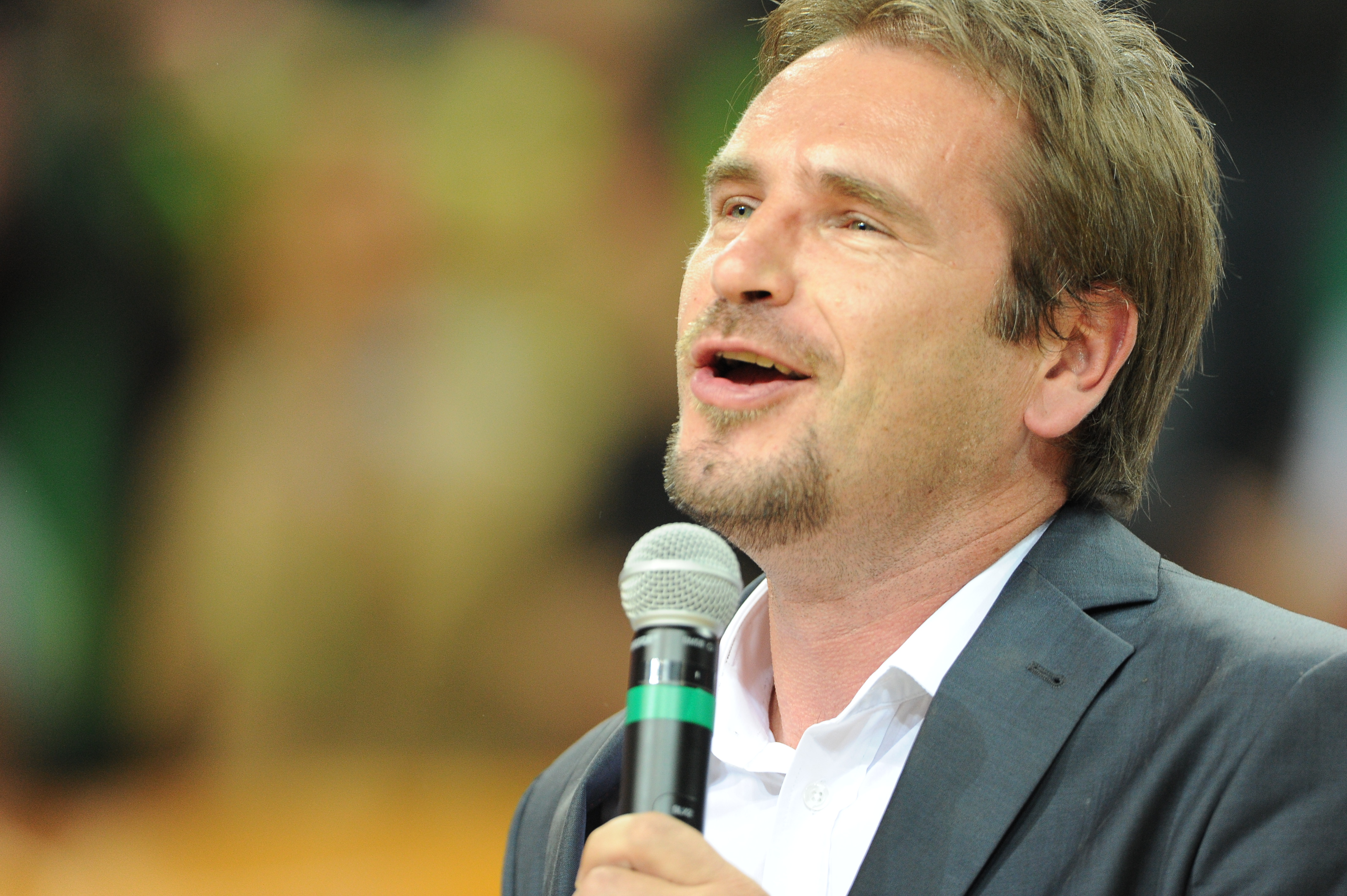
Marijonas Mikutavičius in EuroBasket 2011

Origins of Lithuanian pop music are in music of the cafes and restaurants of temporary capital of Lithuania - Kaunas in the 1930s. It was called estradinė muzika (estrade-music), lengvoji muzika (light music) and the phenomena sometimes named as mažoji scena (the little stage). Pop music bands Kopų balsai (Sounds of the dunes) (in the beginning influenced by Juozas Tiškus orchestra), created in 1957 and band Nerija, which started activity in 1970 became very popular in Lithuania.

From the 2000s on, one of the most popular band in Lithuania is SKAMP. Although some pop groups sing in English, pop music in Lithuanian language is very popular.

- Vytautas Kernagis
- Sel
- GJan
- Happyendless
- Marijonas Mikutavičius
- Žas
- Monika Linkytė
- Donny Montell
- LT United
- The Roop
- Ten Walls
- Jurga Šeduikytė
- Leon Somov & Jazzu
- Radži
- dj nevykele

== Heavy metal ==
- Katedra
- Obtest
- lt:Dissimulation
- lt:Thundertale

== Hip hop ==
- G&G Sindikatas
- Yabujin
- Shampanas
- Erkė

== Electronic ==
The group Saulės laikrodis created in 1976, and Argo - in 1979 are considered the pioneers of electronic music in Lithuania. Sound director of Argo, Orūnas Urbonas constructed sound synthesizers (quasi-moog) for the group needs.

== Jazz music ==
Jazz was quite often mentioned in the press of Lithuania before the WWII. Back in Lithuania's first period of independence (1918-1940), the country was part of swinging Europe. Nearly every Lithuanian town had its own jazz band, and traditional jazz repertoire was performed by prestigious orchestras under the leadership of Mykolas Hofmekleris (violinist), Abraomas Stupelis (violinist), Danielius Pomerancas (violinist). Jazz was played in the modern cafés and restaurants of interbellum Kaunas - Konradas, Monika, Aldona, Versalis, Metropolis. In 1935 in the cinema Metropolitain, first concert of jazz orchestra took place. The jazz orchestra was assembled from leading musicians of Kaunas, most likely the basis was a band which played in the Konradas café in the Laisvės Alley. In 1940 in Kaunas Radio (Kauno radiofonas) was the first official jazz orchestra launched and led by Abraomas Stupelis. He is considered the pioneer of the Lithuanian big band. Mykolas Hofmekleris in 1932 was decorated with the Order of the Lithuanian Grand Duke Gediminas for his activity in the field of music.

Soviet occupation destroyed much of the vibrant cultural life, cafes were closed, jazz was considered as an ideologically and politically charged music of the West. Jazz scene was active even during the years of Soviet occupation. First sign of revival was an orchestra of Kaunas Polytechnic Institute led by Juozas Tiškus. Juozas Tiškus formed a professional swing orchestra of 28 members. Juozas Tiškus is also considered one of the instigators of popular Lithuanian music. The real breakthrough would occur in 1970–71 with the coming together of the Ganelin/Tarasov/Chekasin trio, the alleged instigators of the Vilnius Jazz School. The trio, known also as Ganelin Trio or GTCh combined free jazz with elements of Lithuanian folk and classic music. Café Neringa in Vilnius and café Tulpė (former Konradas) in Kaunas became places for jazz lovers and players.

Almost anything can be found on the jazz scene in Lithuania today, from Dixieland and a cappella groups, to all kinds of jazz fusion, nu-jazz and jazzcore.

There are quite a few international jazz festivals in Lithuania:

- Vilnius Jazz Festival
- Vilnius Mama Jazz
- Birštonas Jazz
- Kaunas Jazz
- Klaipėda Castle Jazz Festival
- Nida Jazz

Jazz bands and performers:

- Petras Vyšniauskas
- lt:Saulės kliošas
- lt:Liudas Mockūnas
- Lithuanian Radio and Television Big Band

== Music festivals and events ==
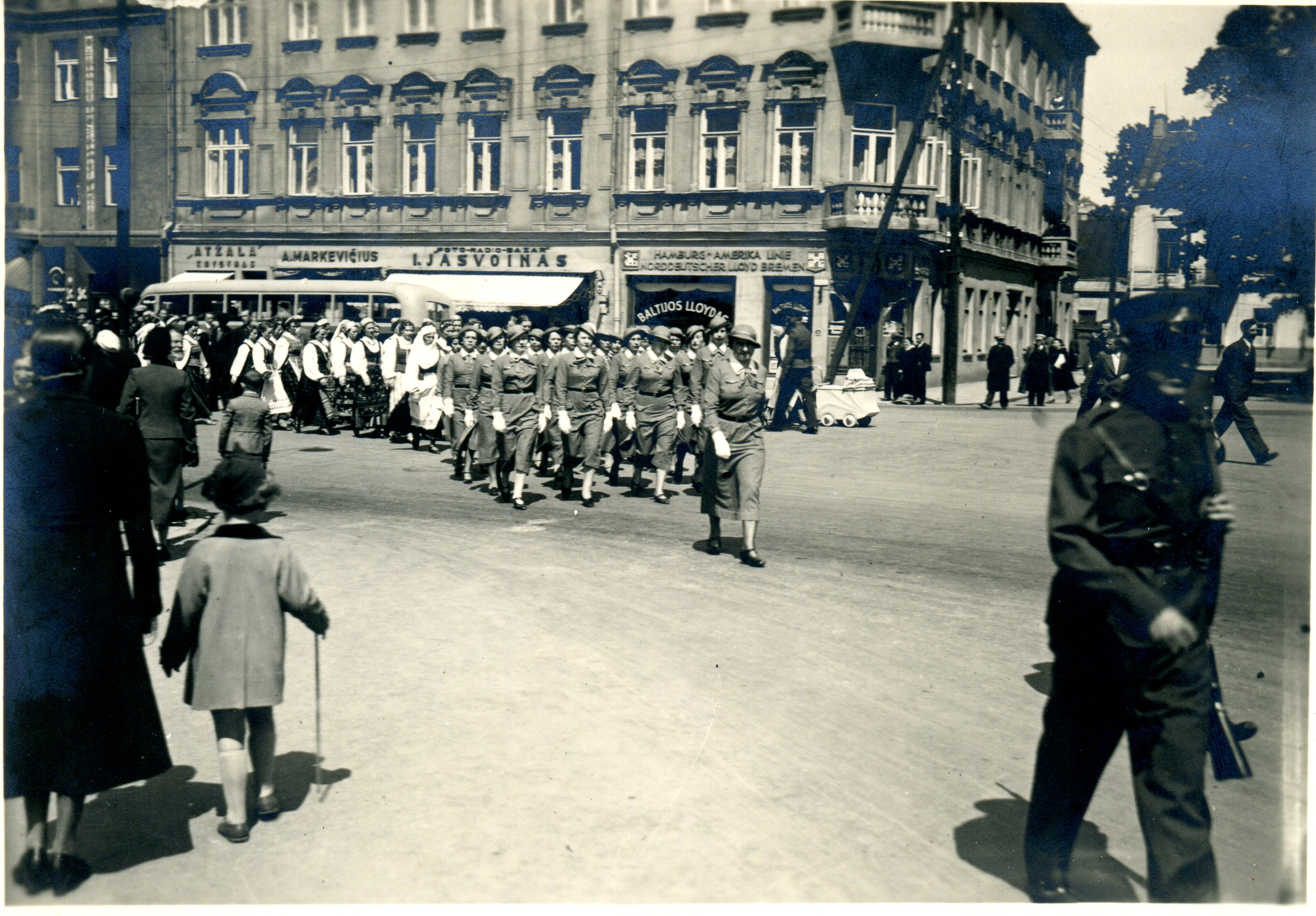
Dainų šventė (Lithuanian Song Festival) procession in 1937, Kaunas

1924 saw the first Dainų šventė (The Lithuanian Song Festival), song festivals which were state-supported and helped to keep folk traditions alive; these were held every five years (every four since 1990). Similar festivals take place in Estonia and Latvia since the 1870s. The 1960s saw people rebelling against Soviet-controlled traditions, and led a roots revival that soon led to celebrations of Lithuanian identity in festivals and celebrations.

Lithuania is home to many folk music festivals. The Dainų šventė song festival is perhaps the most famous; it was first held in 1924, and has continued every five years since. Other major folk festivals include the Skamba skamba kankliai and the Atataria trimitai, both held annually; of historical importance is the Ant marių krantelio, which was held in the 1980s and was the first major festival of its kind. The Baltica International Folklore Festival is held in one of the Baltic states every year.

The GAIDA Festival, organised in Vilnius since 1991 is the largest and the most prominent festival of modern music in Lithuania and in all Baltic countries.
