= List of Lithuanian composers =

The following is a partial list of Lithuanian composers.

== A ==
- Kęstutis Antanėlis

== B ==
- Vytautas Bacevičius
- Osvaldas Balakauskas
- Vytautas Barkauskas
- Vidmantas Bartulis

== C ==
- Mikalojus Konstantinas Čiurlionis

== D ==
- Balys Dvarionas

== G ==
- Nailia Galiamova
- Gediminas Gelgotas
- Juozas Gruodis

== K ==
- Bronius Kutavičius

== See also ==
- List of Lithuanians
