= Fire Hunt with Beaters =

Fire Hunt with Beaters (Lithuanian: Ugnies medžioklė su varovais, Hunt with Beaters for Fire) was the first Lithuanian theatre musical. Formally, its plot is a traditional love triangle, however with unexpected twists, evolving in the environment of Soviet Lithuania. The music is by Giedrius Kuprevičius, the libretto is by Saulius Šaltenis (songs) and Leonidas Jacinevičius (prose).

Lithuanian theatre critic Audronė Girdzijauskaitė explained the title as follows: "Fire is living human feelings, aspirations, desires. The chorus commenting on the actions and events are the beaters who help in the fire hunt".

== Plot ==
Monika and Rolandas study together in Vilnius and have a romance. After the studies Monika was assigned to teach in a small town, while Rolandas stayed in the city. (Note: In the Soviet Union, the graduates of higher education were usually subject to a "distribution" (распределение) to work for several years in prescribed locations.) At the train station during the farewell they get into a quarrel, a discharged soldier Julius intervenes and Rolandas injures his arm. Monika takes care of him and lets him live in her home. Monika expects a child from Rolandas, but agrees to marry Jonas, and after some time she starts having feelings towards him, forgetting the past. Here comes Rolandas full of jealousy and demands Monika to make a decision about her feelings return. Tormented, Monika dies at the childbirth without revealing whom she actually loved. Rolandas demands the child, but Julius refuses.

== History ==
Answering at the question how he came up with the idea of a musical, Kuprevičius said that at the time he was writing music for theatre. The play Fire Hunting seemed "too declarative, with too much pathos" to him, and he decided to soften up it with music. But gradually he got enthusiastic, and over 30 musical numbers were created. To put up a musical was unusual in the Soviet times, but Jesus Christ Superstar had already become very popular in the West, and it was encouraging.

The musical was premiered in 1974, at the drama theatre in the small Latvian town of Valmiera. In 1975 the Soviet state record label Melodiya produced an LP, where the musical was titled Ugnies medžioklė / Загонщики огня ("Fire Beaters"). The first production in Lithuania was staged by Dalia Tamulevičiūtė in the Lithuanian State Youth Theatre, Vilnius. It was translated into five languages: Estonian, Moldovan, Ukrainian, Russian, and Latvian.

The first trio of actors who played the main characters were Vytautas Kernagis (Rolandas), Gintarė Jautakaitė (Monika), and Arvydas Navalinskas (Julijus).

After the premiere it was played for about six years. In 2004 it was rebooted, premiering at the Vilnius Cinema Theatre Pergalė on November 30, the first time with live music, with several new songs from the composer. The instrumental parts were performed by the symphony orchestra and known Lithuanian rock musicians. The choir part will be performed by the youth chamber choir "Aidija" with the Vilnius Youth Orchestra.

In 2014 it was staged at the Alytus City Theatre, and Klaipėda "Taškas" theatre in 2019.

The song "Kregždutės, kregždutės" ("Swallows, Swallows") from the musical gained popularity, and its cover by Andrius Mamontovas and Atlanta was voted best in 2003 at the Bravo music awards.

Kernagis was including the song "Kaip mažas paukštukas" in his solo concerts.
