= Vytautas Klova =

Lithuanian composer and educator

Vytautas Klova (January 31, 1926 in Tirkšliai, Mažeikiai district – December 10, 2009 in Vilnius) was a Lithuanian composer and educator. His best-known work is opera Pilėnai, based on the historical events in Pilėnai. It is by far the most popular Lithuanian opera.

== Biography ==
From 1946 to 1948 Klova studied in the composition class of professor Juozas Gruodis at the Kaunas Conservatory. In 1951 he finished professor Antanas Račiūnas' composition class at the Lithuanian Academy of Music and Theatre (then known as the Lithuanian Conservatory). From 1954 to 1994 Klova lectured on music theory at the same academy. In 1982 he received his professor's degree.

Klova is the author of the first Lithuanian textbook of polyphony. He received the Lithuanian SSR State Prize for his works in 1957, 1960 and 1970.

== Works ==
Klova wrote 6 operas:

- Pilėnai (opera) (1955) – most popular of his works and was named as classics of the Lithuanian opera
- Vaiva (1957)
- Duktė ("Daughter") (1960)
- Žalgiris (Du kalavijai) ("Grunvald (Two Swords)") (1965)
- Amerikoniškoji tragedija ("American Tragedy") (1968)
- Ave, vita (1974)

He also harmonized more than 100 Lithuanian folk songs.
