= Žibuoklė Martinaitytė =

Lithuanian composer (born 1973)

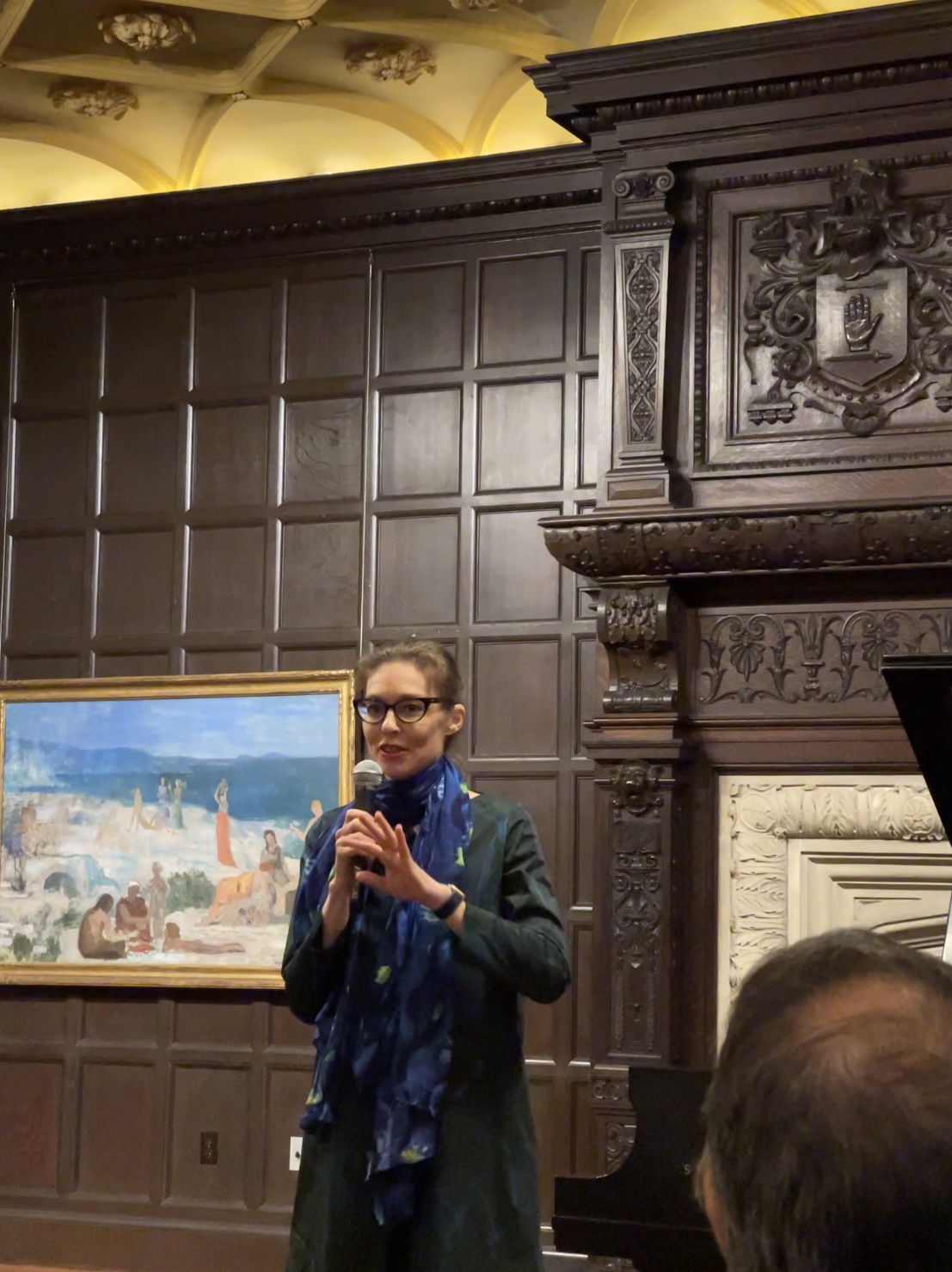
- Žibuoklė Martinaitytė presenting her piece "Polyphonies of Being" at the Philips Collection in Washington D.C, 2022
- Born: 4 May 1973 (age 52); Leningrad, Russian SFSR, USSR
- Education: Lithuanian Academy of Music and Theatre in Vilnius
- Occupation: Composer
- Spouse: True Rosaschi
- Website: https://www.zibuokle.com/

Žibuoklė Martinaitytė // (born 4 May 1973) is a Lithuanian composer based in New York City. In 2022 she was awarded the Lithuanian National Prize for Culture and Arts. In 2020 Martinaitytė received a Guggenheim Fellowship and the Lithuanian Government Prize for Culture and Arts for her creative achievements. Her work In Search of Lost Beauty.... received two gold medals at the Global Music Awards for "Best Composer" and Best Album.

== Life ==
Žibuoklė Martinaitytė studied music from 1979 to 1991 at the Kaunas J. Naujalis Art school. From 1991 to 1997 she studied composition at the Lithuanian Academy of Music and Theatre in Vilnius under Professor Bronius Kutavičius and Julius Juzeliūnas. After graduating in 1997, she attended various summer courses for composers: Darmstädter Ferienkurse, the 6th International Academy for New Composition and Audio Art in Schwaz/Tirol, Austria with Bogusław Schaeffer and Marek Chołoniewski, Fondation Royaumont in France with Brian Ferneyhough, José Evangelista and Jean-Luc Herve, IRCAM/Centre Acanthes in France with Jonathan Harvey and Michael Jarrell and the Stavanger orchestral music course in Norway with Ole Lützow-Holm.

When Vilnius became the European Capital of Culture in 2009, Lithuanian National Radio and Television commissioned A Thousand Doors To The World for performance by a symphony orchestra.

In 2022 Martinaitytė was awarded the Lithuanian National Prize for Culture and Arts. In 2020 she received a Guggenheim Fellowship and the Lithuanian Government Award for her creative work.

Ms. Martinaitytė is married to sound designer True Rosaschi.

== Selected works ==
=== Orchestral ===
- A Thousand Doors To The World (2009)
- Horizons (2013)
- Millefleur (2018)
- Saudade (2019)
- Catharsis (2021)

=== Chamber orchestra or large ensemble ===
- Completely Embraced By The Beauty Of Emptiness (2006) for 13 instruments
- Sort Sol (2019) for string orchestra
- Ex Tenebris Lux (2021) for string orchestra

=== Wind band ===
- 4 Forces (2022) for symphonic wind band orchestra

=== Soloist and orchestra ===
- Chiaroscuro Trilogy (2017) for piano and string orchestra
- Sielunmaisema (2019) for cello and string orchestra
- Nunc fluens. Nunc stans (2020) for percussion and string orchestra

=== Small ensemble ===
- Attention! High Tension! (2001) for tuba and piano
- Ode to Joy (2004) for flute, viola and harpsichord (piano)
- Driving Force (2004) for trombone, tenor saxophone and accordion
- Inhabited Silences (2010) for piano trio
- American Hodgepodge (2011) for flute, bass clarinet, violin, violoncello and electronics
- Gridlock (2012–2013) for clarinet, violoncello and piano
- Louder-Quieter (2014) for 2 trombones and tuba
- Incessant Confluences (2014) for flute and piano
- OSMOSIS (2015) for brass sextet
- In Search Of Lost Beauty...(2016) for violin, cello, piano, electronics and video
- Unique Forms of Continuity in Space (2017) for 2 pianos and percussion
- Solastalgia (2020) for clarinet, violin, viola, cello and piano
- ... and under every deep a lower deep opens (2020) for cello and piano
- Hadal Zone (2020–2021) for bass clarinet, tuba, violoncello, contrabass, piano and electronics

=== Solo instrument ===
- Impulses (2007–2008) for piano
- Forgotten Melodies (2007) for bassoon
- Heights and Depths of Love (2007–2008) for piano
- Serenity Diptychs (2015) for violin, electronics and video
- Aires De Ugnis (2015) for guitar
- Flashes of Illuminations (2016) for piano
- Gradations of Light (2018) for piano
- Braiding (2018) for viola
- Ephemeral (2016–2019) for cello and electronics
- KALBA (2019–2020) for viola and electronics
- Abyssal Zone (2020) for contrabass
- On The Threshold (2020) for violin
- close the eyes of memory (2022) for organ
- Lumen in Umbra (2018–2022) for piano
- Polyphonies of Being (2022) for piano

=== Vocal ===
- The Blue of Distance (2010) for a cappella choir
- Chant des Voyelles (2018) for a cappella choir
- Aletheia (2022) for a cappella choir
- Densité de présence (2022) for 8 female voices and 5 cellos

== Discography ==
=== Solo CDs ===
- Horizons (Music Information Centre Lithuania, 2017)
- In Search of Lost Beauty... (Starkland, 2019)
- Saudade (Ondine, 2021)
- Ex Tenebris Lux (Ondine, 2022)
- Hadal Zone (Cantaloupe Music, 2023)

=== Group CDs ===
- Zoom in 6: new music from Lithuania (Music Information Centre Lithuania, 2007)
- Zoom in 10: new music from Lithuania (Music Information Centre Lithuania, 2014)
- Anthology of Lithuanian Art Music in the 21st Century (Music Information Centre Lithuania, 2017)
- Zoom in 12: New Art Music from Lithuania (Music Information Centre Lithuania, 2018)
- Zoom in 13: New Art Music from Lithuania (Music Information Centre Lithuania, 2019)
- The Color of There Seen From Here (Innova Recordings, 2019)
- Monochrome (Melos New Music Vocal Collective and Cello Club, 2023)
