= Audronė Girdzijauskaitė =

Audronė Girdzijauskaitė (born March 18, 1938) is a Lithuanian writer, theater scholar, and art critic and historian, doctor of humanities.

Audronė Girdzijauskaitė was born in Kaunas, Lithuanian SSR. In 1963, she graduated from the State Institute for Theatre Arts (GITIS), Moscow.

== Books ==
She was an editor of a number of monographs in art and theatre history. Her own books include:

- Kazimiera Kymantaitė – Vilnius: Mintis, 1983. – About Kazimiera Kymantaitė, the first female Lithuanian stage director
- Atminties salos (Islands of Memory); book of memoirs. – Vilnius: Lietuvos rašytojų sąjungos leidykla, 2008.
- Laiškai žiūrovams – Vilnius: Lietuvos rašytojų sąjungos leidykla, 2009.
- Nutolę balsai: portretų metmenys (Distant Voices: Portrait Outlines). – Vilnius: Lietuvos rašytojų sąjungos leidykla, 2011.
- Ibsenas Lietuvos teatro veidrodyje (1918-1998) monograph. – Vilnius: Lietuvos rašytojų sąjungos leidykla, 2013.
- Vitalijaus Mazūro aukso amžius, about a painter, puppeteer, scenographer, director Vitalijus Mazūras and his work. – Vilnius: Kultūros barai, 2015.
- Atminties šuliniai (Wells of Memory) (2020), biographical novel

== Awards and decorations ==
- 2011: The book Nutolę balsai entered the list of twelve most creative books of the year.
- 2018: Culture and Art Prize from the Government of the Republic of Lithuania
- 2024: Knight's Cross of the Order for Merits to Lithuania
- 2024: Golden Stage Cross
