= Antanas Račiūnas =

20th-century Lithuanian composer (1905–1984)

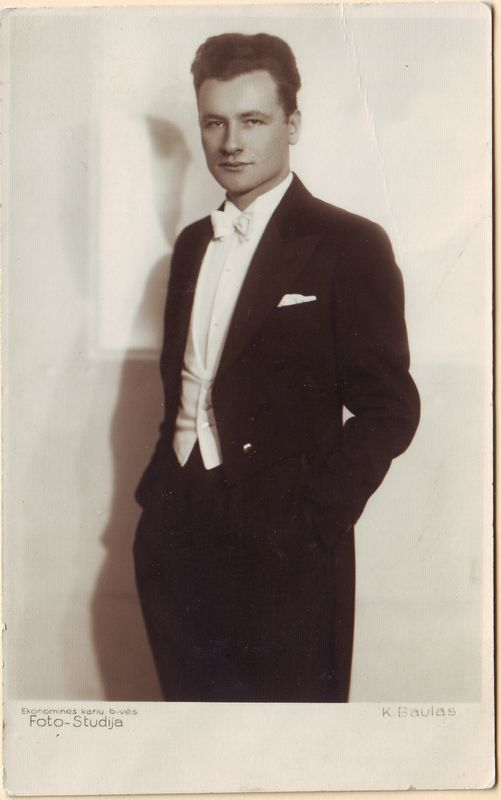

Background information
- Born: 4 September 1905; Užliaušiai, Russian Empire
- Died: 3 April 1984 (aged 78) Vilnius, Lithuanian SSR, Soviet Union
- Occupations: Composer, pedagogue

Antanas Račiūnas (4 September 1905, Užliaušiai – 3 April 1984, Vilnius) was a Lithuanian and Soviet composer and pedagogue. He was awarded People's Artist of the Lithuanian SSR in 1965.

== Biography ==
He graduated from the Kaunas People's Conservatory in 1933, where he was a student of Juozas Gruodis. In 1936, he published his opera Trys Talismanai. It was one of only two works by Lithuanian composers in the original repertory of the Kaunas State Musical Theatre. Between 1936 and 1939, he studied in Paris at the École Normale de Musique de Paris with Nadia Boulanger, Igor Stravinsky, and Charles Koechlin. He was a professor at both the Kaunas Conservatory and at the Vilnius Conservatory. His students included the composers Bronius Kutavičius, Vytautas Barkauskas, Vytautas Klova, Petras Vytautas Paltanavičius, and Eduardas Balsys.

Račiūnas' music, including 10 symphonies, was noted for incorporating folk music and adhering to principles of the romanticism movement.

== Works ==
=== Operas ===
- Trys talismanai (‘Three Talismans’, 1936)
- Gintaro krantas (‘The Amber Shore’, 1940)
- Marytė (1953)
- Saulės miestas (‘City of the Sun’, 1965)
