= Virgilijus Noreika =

Lithuanian opera tenor

- Born: 22 September 1935; Šiauliai, Lithuania
- Died: 3 March 2018 (aged 82); Vilnius, Lithuania
- Education: Lithuanian State Conservatory
- Occupation: Opera singer (tenor)
- Years active: 1957–2018
- Spouses: Žaneta Noreikienė (div.); Loreta Bartusevičiūtė-Noreikienė (1982–2018)
- Children: 2

Virgilijus Kęstutis Noreika (Lithuanian pronunciation: [vɪˈrɡɪlʲɪjʊs nɔrɛɪˈkaː]; 22 September 1935 – 3 March 2018) was a Lithuanian tenor.

== Early life and education ==
Noreika was born in Šiauliai and graduated with honors from the Lithuanian State Conservatory in 1958. A year earlier, while still a student, he was engaged as a performer at the Lithuanian National Opera and Ballet Theatre.

== Career ==
In 1959, Noreika sang the part of Alfredo Germont in Verdi's La traviata, one of Noreika's favorite and most frequently performed roles. Later in 1965, he continued his career at the La Scala in Milan. There he mastered six new roles, and also sang the part of Pinkerton from Puccini's Madama Butterfly.

Noreika's creative biography comprises more than 40 operatic roles: Cavaradossi from Tosca by Puccini, Faust from Faust by Gounod, Rudolfo from La bohème by Puccini, Otello from Otello by Verdi, to name a few. Noreika has performed in Moscow at the Bolshoi Theatre, in Buenos Aires at the Teatro Colón, in Paris at the Opéra National de Paris, and many other famous opera houses.

Noreika has sung in more than 30 foreign theaters, participated in more than 1000 performances, given approximately 600 solo concerts, recorded 20 phonographic records and CDs.

== Recognition and legacy ==
In 1997, he celebrated his 40th anniversary as an operatic tenor, and received the Kipras Award from the Opera Fellow Society. Noreika, semi-retired, was a professor at the Lithuanian Academy of Music and Theatre and the Estonian Academy of Music and Theatre.

In 2011, Noreika was awarded the Lithuanian National Prize for Culture and Arts for "the highest vocal excellence and unfading talent". In 2015 he was awarded Medal of Pushkin in Russia.

To honor his achievements, the first International Virgilijus Noreika Competition for Singers was organised in 2017. The competition will take place every four years around the birth date of Noreika.

== See also ==
Lithuanian opera
