= Rokėnai =

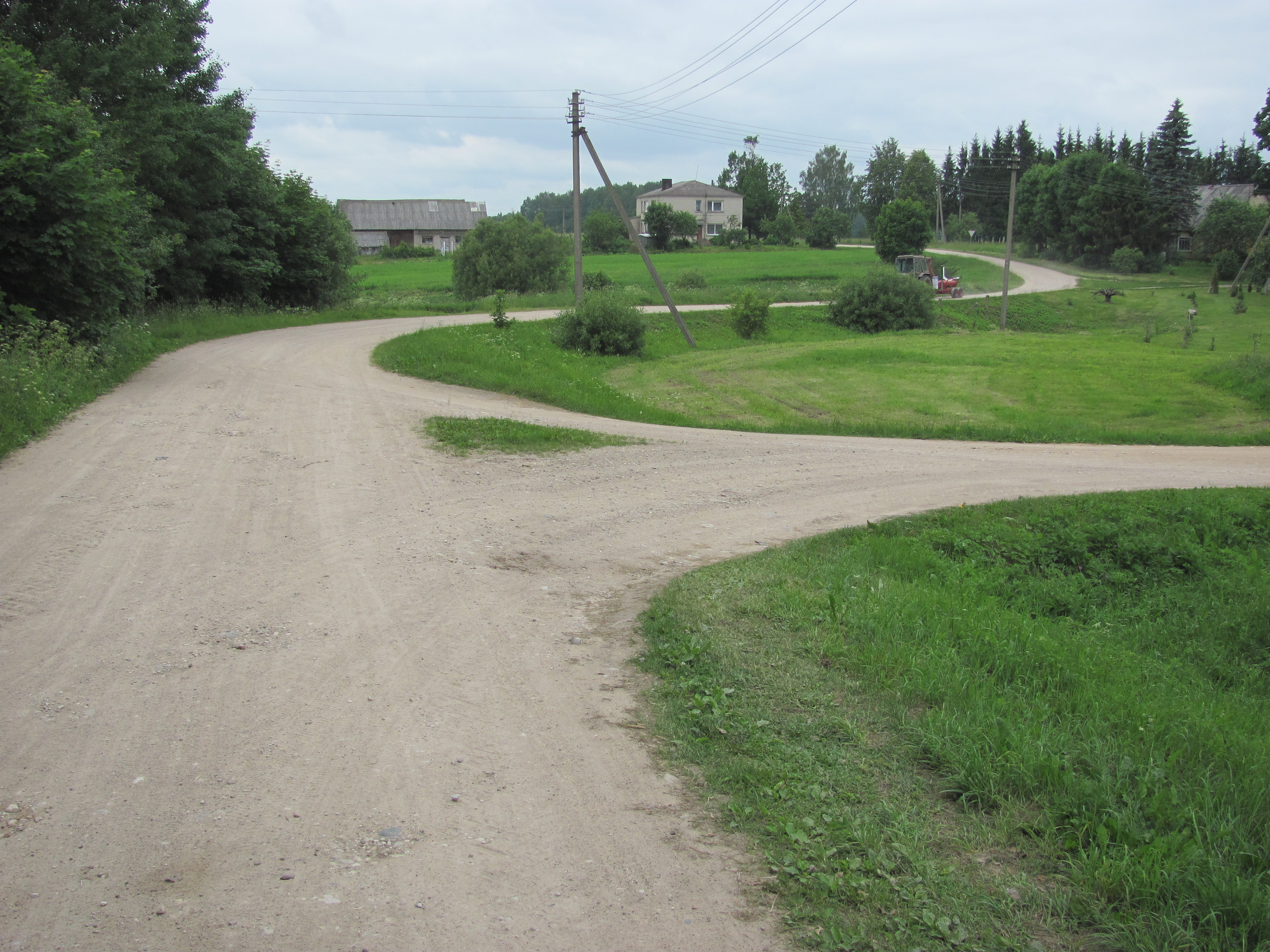

- Location of Rokėnai
- Coordinates: 55°48′00″N 25°54′20″E
- Country: Lithuania
- Ethnographic region: Aukštaitija
- County: Utena County
- Municipality: Zarasai district municipality
- Eldership: Antazavė eldership

Population (2011)
  - Total: 95
- Time zone: UTC+2 (EET)
  - Summer (DST): UTC+3 (EEST)

Rokėnai is a village in Zarasai district municipality, Lithuania. According to 2011 census, the population of Rokėnai was 95. Composer Juozas Gruodis was born in Rokėnai.
