= Pilėnai (opera) =

Lithuanian-language opera

Pilėnai is a Lithuanian-language opera in four acts by Vytautas Klova to a libretto by Jonas Mackonis.

== Plot ==
Duke Margiris of Pilėnai has a daughter Egle, who is in love with Duke Rūtenis of Nalšia. His ward Mirta is in love with the Pilėnai fortress soldier Ūdrys. Ulrich a crusader emissary urges Margiris to fight against Gediminas as Rūtenis coming to visit Egle. Ulirch reveals to Mirta that Margiris is not her real father but her father's murderer and promises to help her avenge him. Mirta reveals to Ulrich the secret entrance to the castle's dungeon. In the midst of the feast, the news is heard that the crusaders are surrounding the castle. Not finding Mirta and Ulrich, Margiris sends Ūdrys to check the exit of the dungeon. Ulrich injures Ūdrys and runs away with Mirta. At the crusader camp Ūdrys finds Mirta and reveals that father died as a traitor to his homeland. Ūdrys hurries to Vilnius to ask Gediminas for reinforcements. The defenders of Pilėnai are overwhelmed by the crusaders, and Gediminas' army does not arrive. As the fortress burns Margiris appeals to his men that it is better to burn than surrender; all die in the flames.

== Roles ==
- Margiris, Duke of Pilėnai (bar)
- Egle, his daughter (sop)
- Mirta, his ward (mezzo)
- Ūdrys, a soldier (bar)
- Rūtenis, Duke of Nalšia (tenor)
- Ulrich, a crusader (bass)

== Excerpts from the opera ==
- Ūdrys' aria
- Egle's aria
- Margiris' aria
