= People's Artist of the Lithuanian SSR =

- Awarded for: Outstanding achievements in the performing arts
- Country: Lithuanian SSR, Soviet Union
- Presented by: Chairman of the Supreme Soviet of the Lithuanian SSR
- First award: April 26, 1946; 80 years ago

People's Artist of the Lithuanian SSR (Lithuanian: Lietuvos TSR liaudies artistas; Russian: Народный артист Литовской ССР) was an honorary title awarded to citizens of the Lithuanian SSR in the Soviet Union. It was awarded for outstanding performance and exceptional merits in the sphere of the performing arts (theatre, music, dance, circus, cinema, etc.).

== Notable recipients ==
- Kazimiera Kymantaitė (1909–1999), film actress and stage director
- Antanas Račiūnas (1905 - 1984), composer and professor
- Juozas Siparis
- Antanas Sodeika
- Kostantinas Galkauskas
- Leonardas Zelchus
- Povilas Gaidys
- Gražina Balandytė
- Gediminas Karka
- Vytautas Paukštė

== See also ==
- People's Artist of the USSR
