= DJ Nevykele =

- Born: Ugnė Dominaitė; June 5, 2006 (age 20); Vilnius, Lithuania
- Genres: Electropop; dance-pop; hyperpop rap
- Years active: 2022–2025
- Label: Autostrada

Ugnė Dominaitė, also known by her stage name DJ Nevykele (stylized in lowercase), is a Lithuanian music performer and songwriter.

In 2022, her track aerobika gained popularity through TikTok and became a major internet hit in Lithuania. In January 2023, Dominaitė won Breakthrough of the Year at the 2022 M.A.M.A. awards.

== Early life ==
In an interview, the performer stated that she had been interested in music since childhood and attended a music school. In 2020, she began learning and creating electronic music on a computer.

== Career ==
In February 2022, Nevykele released her first song, "dreineris konteineris esi", on SoundCloud. On June 5 of the same year, she released "aerobika" on the same platform. This track gained popularity on TikTok as a soundtrack and became one of the most listened-to tracks in Lithuania. Another highly popular track released by Nevykele was "aš tavo lovoj, o tu lolą kapoji".

Following the M.A.M.A. awards in 2023, Nevykele recorded her first album titled "OŽKA", featuring ten tracks. It was released on June 5 of the same year.

On January 27, 2023, a music video for "aerobika", directed by Domas Merkliopas, was released.

On February 23, 2023, she released a track titled "Fake" in collaboration with the rock band Jautì. The track was partially inspired by the hyperpop genre, similar to Nevykele's own work. However, they decided to combine elements of this genre with heavy guitars and dissonant melodies.

To promote the album "OŽKA," Nevykele held concerts in Vilnius, Klaipėda, and Kaunas. She also participated in Jautì's album launch concert.

== Awards ==
Nevykele received attention at the M.A.M.A. 2022 awards in 2023, winning Breakthrough of the Year, Song of the Year, and Progressive Pop Performer of the Year."

== Discography ==
=== Albums ===
Title	Year
OŽKA	2023
flamyngaz.	2024
ATOMINĖ	2025

=== Extended plays ===
Title	Year
NEVYKĖLĖS DIENORAŠTIS	2022
NEVYKĖLĖS GIESMĖS	2024

=== Singles ===
==== As a lead performer ====
Title	Year
aerobika	2022
dreineris konteineris esi	2022
neleisiu glostyt kasharo	2022
aš tavo lovoj, o tu lolą kapoji	2022
rūkymo zona (with mdnght7)	2022
eyez	2022
2013	2023
zdrw dar kartą	2024
M.A.trica	2025
WIFEY	2025
Outro	2025
prie ežero	2026

===== As a featured performer =====
Title	Year
issilydziau (barkodas featuring dj nevykele)	2022
Fake (jautì featuring dj nevykele)	2023
