= Kazimiera Kymantaitė =

Lithuanian actress and stage director

Kazimiera Kymantaitė (June 29, 1909 – May 21, 1999) (Surname by the first marriage: Gregorauskienė, by the second marriage: Banaitienė) was a Soviet and Lithuanian stage and film actress, Lithuania's first female professional stage director.

She was born in Kuršėnai, then in Russian Empire. When she was 12 her family moved to Kaunas. She died in Vilnius and was interred in the Rasos Cemetery by the grave of her husband Juozas Banaitis.

Several books were published about her.

== Awards ==
- 1994: Order of the Lithuanian Grand Duke Gediminas
- 1957: Lithuanian SSR State Prize for her role of Kaikarienė in the play Paskenduolė ("The Drowned Woman") based on the short story of Antanas Vienuolis
- 1954: People's Artist of the Lithuanian SSR
- Soviet decorations: three orders and several medals, including two Orders of the Red Banner of Labour (1950, 1954)
