= Saulius Šaltenis =

Lithuanian writer

- Born: 24 December 1945 (age 80); Utena, Lithuanian SSR, Soviet Union
- Education: Vilnius University
- Occupations: Writer, newspaper editor, politician
- Spouse(s): Aušra Marija Sluckaitė, Lola Adelė Pajėdaitė
- Children: Joris Jurašas, Indrė, Saulė
- Parent(s): Rapolas Šaltenis, Sofija Išganaitytė
- Writing career
- Notable works: Riešutų duona, Atminimo cukrus, Kalės vaikai
- Notable awards: Lithuanian Independence Medal, 2000; Lithuanian National Prize for Culture and Arts, 2020

Saulius Šaltenis (born 24 December 1945) is a Lithuanian writer, newspaper editor, and politician. In 1990, he was among those who signed the Act of the Re-Establishment of the State of Lithuania. He served as the Minister of Culture from 1996 to 1999 in the Government of Gediminas Vagnorius

== Biography ==
Šaltenis was born into a family of Lithuanian teachers in Utena, Lithuanian SSR. He attended Utena Secondary School No. 2 from 1963 to 1964 and studied philology at Vilnius University while working as a laborer at the Vilnius Drill Factory. After his freshman year, he was drafted into the Soviet Army and did not continue his studies after his return. From 1969 to 1972 worked on the editorial board at the Lithuanian Film Studios. In 1989 co-founded the weekly magazine Šiaurės Atėnai with Arvydas Juozaitis and Saulius Stoma and was its editor from 1990 to 1994. From 1994 to 1996, he was the editor-in-chief at the news daily Lietuvos aidas.

Šaltenis has been a member of the Lithuanian Writers' Union since 1971, and a member of the presidium of this union since 1986. He is also a board member of the Lithuanian Cinematographer's Union, as well as a member of the Journalist's Society and of the Lithuanian Citizens' Charter.

== Political career ==
In 1988, Šaltenis joined the pro-independence Sąjūdis (Lithuanian Reform Movement) and was elected to the Supreme Council – Reconstituent Seimas, becoming a signatory of the Act of the Re-Establishment of the State of Lithuania. He was reelected to the Seimas until 2000. He served as the Minister of Culture from 1996 to 1999 in the Government of Gediminas Vagnorius. Until 2000, he was also vice-chairman of the Homeland Union (Lithuanian Conservatives).

== Writing career ==
Šaltenis's first stories were published in 1963 in the cultural journal Literatūra ir menas. In 1966, he published his first book, a collection of short stories titled Atostogos (Holidays). He co-wrote the first Lithuanian musicals Fire Hunt with Beaters (Ugnies medžioklė su varovais); 1976) with the prose writer Leonidas Jacinevičius and Komunarų gatvė (Communard Street; 1978) with Sigitas Geda. He wrote the script for the film version of his story Riešutų duona (Hazelut Bread), as well as for the films Skrydis per Lietuvą (Flight over Lithuania) and Herkus Mantas (English title: Northern Crusades). In 2017, he wrote the script for Eimuntas Nekrošius's staging of his story Kalės vaikai (Children of a Bitch). In 2020, he won the Lithuanian National Prize for Culture and Arts.

== Published works ==
- Atostogos: apsakymai. – Vilnius: Vaga, 1966. – 75 p.
- Riešutų duona; Henrikas Montė: apysakos / dail. Vladislovas Žilius. – Vilnius: Vaga, 1972. – 176 p.: iliustr.
- Duokiškis: apysaka. – Vilnius: Vaga, 1977. – 65 p.
- Škac, mirtie, visados škac!; Jasonas: pjesės. – Vilnius: Vaga, 1978. – 141 p.
- Atminimo cukrus: apsakymai ir apysaka. – Vilnius: Vaga, 1983. – 187 p.
- Apysakos / dail. Elvyra Kriaučiūnaitė. – Vilnius: Vaga, 1986. – 251 p.
- Lituanica; Duokiškio baladės: pjesės / iliustr. Henrikas Ratkevičius. – Vilnius: Vaga, 1989. – 162 p. – ISBN 5-415-00309-6
- Kalės vaikai: romanas. – Vilnius: Vaga, 1990. – 194 p. – ISBN 5-415-00524-2
- Pokalbiai prieš aušrą: publicistika. – Vilnius: Lietuvos aidas, 1995. – 184 p. – ISBN 9986-460-07-7
- Riešutų duona: apysakos ir apsakymai / sud. Kęstutis Urba. – Kaunas: Šviesa, 2003. – 174 p. – ISBN 5-430-03646-3
- Kalės vaikai: rinktinė. – Vilnius: Žaltvykslė, 2006. – 415 p. – ISBN 9986-06-147-4
- Pjesės / parengė Agnė Iešmantaitė. – Vilnius: Žaltvykslė, 2006. – 111 p. – ISBN 9986-06-125-3
- Kalės vaikai: romanas / parengė Agnė Iešmantaitė. – Vilnius: Žaltvykslė, 2006. – 115 p. – ISBN 9986-06-126-1
- Proza: novelės ir apysakos / parengė Agnė Iešmantaitė. – Vilnius: Žaltvykslė, 2006. – 129 p. – ISBN 9986-06-124-5
- Lietuvių grotesko ir ironijos dramos: Juozas Grušas, Kazys Saja, Saulius Šaltenis: skaitiniai / sud. Agnė Iešmantaitė. – Vilnius: Žaltvykslė, 2007. – 223 p. – ISBN 978-9986-06-231-8
- Demonų amžius: proza ir dramaturgija. – Vilnius: Tyto alba, 2014. – 295 p. – ISBN 978-609-466-019-1
- Žydų karalaitės dienoraštis: romanas. – Vilnius: Tyto alba, 2015. – 150 p. – ISBN 978-609-466-119-8
- Basas ir laimingas: romanas. – Vilnius: Tyto alba, 2016. – 211 p. – ISBN 978-609-466-213-3
- Diary of a Jewish Girl: novel / trans. Marija Marcinkute. – Nottingham, UK: Noir Press, 2020. – 176 p. – ISBN 978-099-556-006-2
- Geležiniai gyvatės kiaušiniai: romanas. – Vilnius: Tyto alba, 2020. – 197 p. – ISBN 978-609-466-460-1
- Bees on the Snow (Kalės vaikai): novel / trans. by Elizabeth Novickas. – Flossmoor, IL: Pica Pica Press, 2021. 158 p. – ISBN 978-099-663-045-0
