= Onutė Narbutaitė =

Lithuanian composer

Onutė Narbutaitė (born June 12, 1956, Vilnius) is a Lithuanian composer.

She graduated in 1979 from the Lithuanian State Conservatory where she studied composition with Julius Juzeliūnas. From 1979 to 1982 she taught music theory and history there. Since then she has been working as a freelance composer in Vilnius. Her works have been performed at concerts and music festivals in Stockholm, Helsinki, Munich, Bern, Amsterdam, Seattle, Canada, and Japan.

In 1997 Narbutaitė received the Lithuanian National Prize.

== Works ==
Partial List

- Sonata for Cello and Piano (1977)
- Night Cantata (1978)
- Symphony No. 1 (1979)
- String Quartet No. 2, "Open the Gate of Oblivion" (1980)
- Vilnius Divertimento for 10 instruments (1984)
- Liberation (1989)
- Opus lugubre (1991)
- String Quartet No. 3, "The Drawing and returning Winter" (1991)
- Sinfonia col triangolo (1996)
- Oratorio, "Patchwork for My City" (Centones meae urbi) (1997)
- "Melody in the garden of olives" (Lith."Melodija alyvu sode") for trumpet and 2 strings quartets (2000)
- Symphony No. 2 (2001)
- Three Symphonies of the Mother of God (2003)
- "La barca" for orchestra (2005)
- "Le linee e i contorni" for flute, clarinet, violin and cello (2006)
- riva fiume sinfonia (2007)
- Opera, "Cornet" (2012)
- Heliography (2015)
