= Beater (hunting) =

Person who drives game out of areas of cover

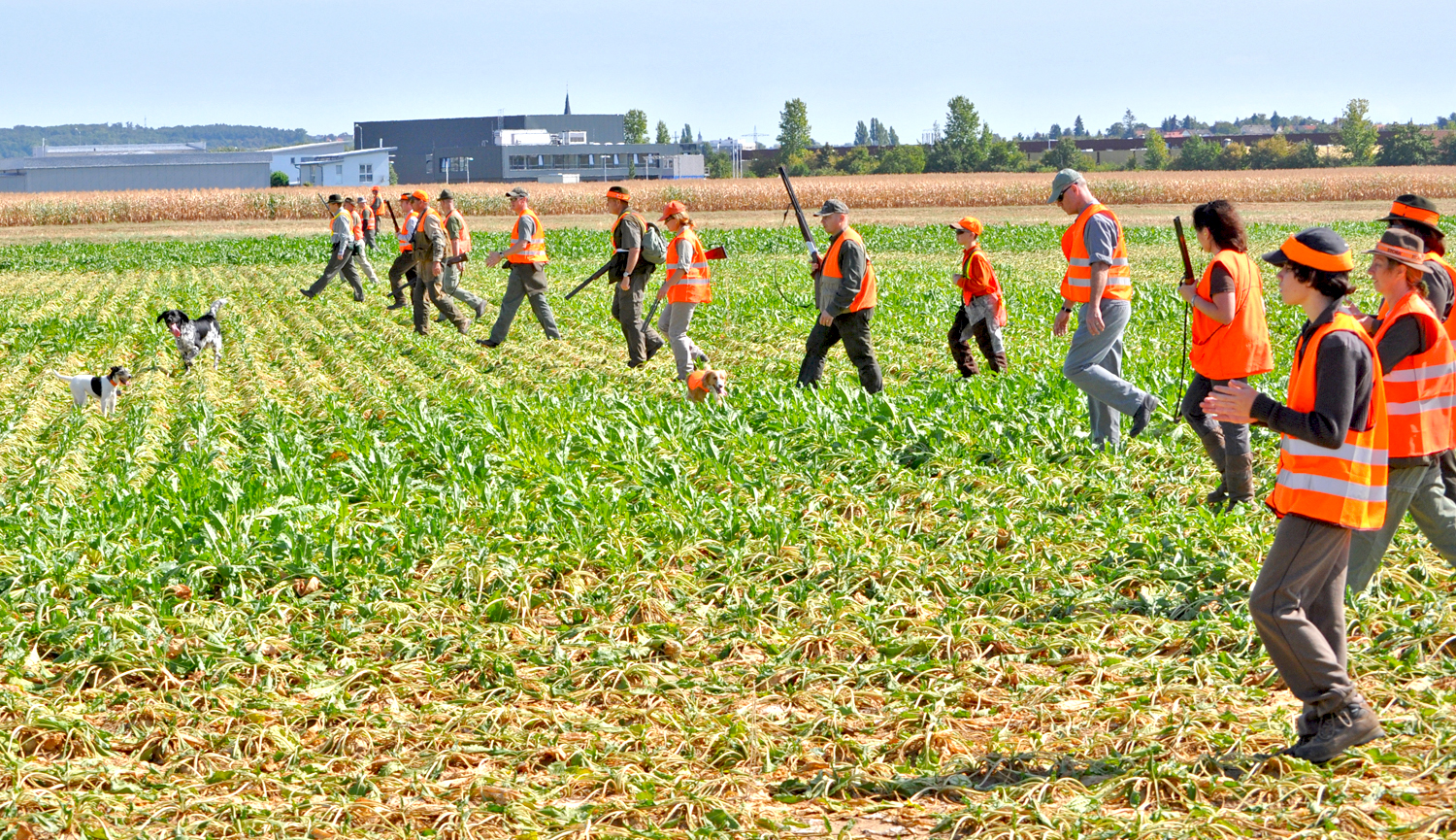
Beaters and shooters sweep the area hunting the foxes who raid local farms

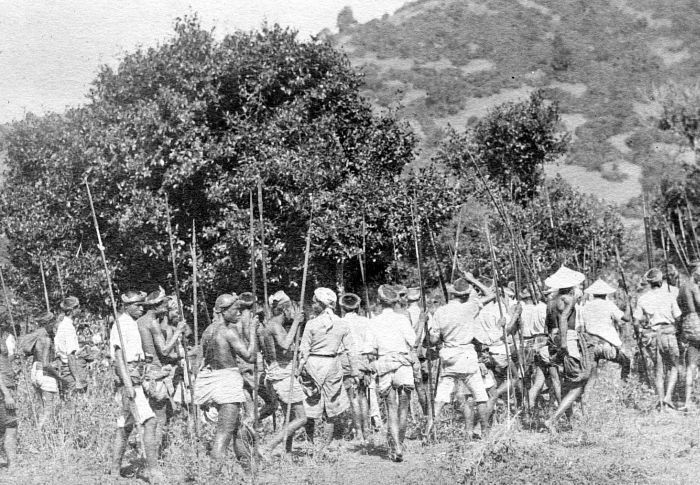
Beaters, Indonesia (1900–1940)

In hunting, beaters are assistants of hunters who drive game from hiding into the open or towards the shooters by making noise and other disturbance: shouting, beating the trees and bushes with sticks, using rattles/ratchtets/clappers, shooting in the air, etc. In various countries hunting with beaters may be of special types and have special names: driven hunt/driven hunting =no:Drivjakt =es:batida = battue = de:Drückjagd, de:Streifjagd ("strip hunting"), de:Kesseltreiben ("kettle driving") de:Lappjagd sv:Klappjakt (""clap hunting"), pl:Naganka etc.

Beaters usually are unarmed, but may be accompanied with dogs. In Germany, high-visibility clothing is compulsory for beaters, for safety reasons.

== Traditions ==
In Holy Roman Empire there was a beater duty during lordly hunts, and there was a special tax for the Jews, called de:Federlappengeld, paid to exempt them from the duty.

The expression "wikt:beat about the bush" or "beat around the bush" comes from the method of fowling when beaters beat about the bush where the flock is roosting.

Beaters can wave flags on the ends of the drive line, to make the fowl stay within the shooting range.
