= Music Information Centre Lithuania =

- Lietuvos muzikos informacijos centras (LMIC)
- Abbreviation: MICL
- Predecessor: Lithuanian Music Information and Publishing Centre
- Formation: February 1996
- Founder: Lithuanian Composers' Union
- Headquarters: A. Mickevičiaus g. 29, 08117 Vilnius
- Director: Asta Pakarklytė
- Parent organization: Lithuanian Composers' Union
- Website: MICL

Music Information Centre Lithuania (MICL) is a non-governmental and non-profit public institution devoted to the promotion of Lithuanian music culture at home and abroad. In carrying out its role LMIPC catalogues, collects, publishes, provides access to, and actively promotes music by the Lithuanian composers, songwriters, improvisers, performers and sound artists who enter in a list of MICL from diverse genres. However MICL mainly focuses on contemporary art music and 20th-century classics.

== History ==
The predecessor of Music Information Centre Lithuania, Lithuanian Music Information and Publishing Centre was established in 1996, as an information and publishing unit under the auspices of the Lithuanian Composers’ Union.In February 2015 Lithuanian Music Information and Publishing Centre name was changed to Music Information Centre Lithuania. MICL has been a member of the International Association of Music Information Centres since 1998. Since 2001, it has been working as a non-government, non-profit public institution, founded by the Lithuanian Composers’ Union. Since 2006, the MICL has been also running the Music Lithuania export project that aims to maintain close contacts with all relevant parties in the Lithuanian music industry and facilitate the export of Lithuanian music productions ranging from pop, folk, jazz and electronic to post/modern art music. The MICL also collaborates with the international recording companies, licensing the recordings for release in various markets world-wide.

== Mission ==
For nearly two decades, MICL have sought to make the music created by Lithuanian artists more accessible, to get it more often performed and heard. Through the ever-expanding national and international cooperation with individual artists, contributors and institutions, the MICL seeks to cover and promote a wide diversity of musical genres, currently including classical/contemporary, jazz/improvised, folk/world/country, pop/rock/urban, electronic music and oldies. MICL serves the needs of people, professionally involved in different genres of music.

== Database ==
Music Information Centre Lithuania facilities available for public use:

- manuscript archive, containing scores and parts by Lithuanian classical and contemporary composers (original manuscripts, hard and digital copies of almost 7.000 works);
- sound archive of Lithuanian classical and contemporary music (over 10.000 unreleased recordings);
- library of published scores (almost 3.000 musical works), periodicals, books and commercially released recordings (more than 1.300 publications and releases);
- on-line database on Lithuanian music and musicians (almost 400 profiles with catalogue of works and/or discography) with music samples provided.

Lithuanian music manuscripts started to be collected at 1946 by the USSR Lithuanian Music Fund and in 1996 this function was given to newly established MICL. The collection of Lithuanian composers’ scores is the main and the biggest archive of this kind in the country.

MICL on-line database is one of the oldest Lithuanian electronic information resources devoted to culture (it was launched in 1997). It has been expanding across a broad variety of musical genres since 2006, currently including information about Lithuanian music and musicians of six diverse genres.

== Publishing ==
In 1997, the MICL began to publish scores and recordings of Lithuanian contemporary art music and 20th-century classical repertoire. MICL publishing activity has covered a broad range of genres, from classical music (e.g. the Lithuanian Classical Series, for the most prominent scores by Lithuanian composers) to pop/rock/electronic, folk and jazz music (e.g. the promotional CDs Note Lithuania). The MICL catalogue currently includes 111 printed editions and 77 CD releases. In 2018 MICL published its first vinyl in split format of two contemporary music groups - Twentytwentyone and DIISSC Orchestra.

== Promotion and marketing ==
The MICL pursues active promotion of Lithuanian classical and contemporary music among performers, organisers of music events, broadcasters, journalists, by sending and giving out the packages of CDs, scores, catalogues, brochures, and other material. The MICL also co-organises performances of Lithuanian music at international events.

As a publisher, the MICL collaborates with the international recording companies (such as Naxos, Finlandia Records - at present, a division of the Warner Classics label, Ondine, Avie Records, Megadisc, Toccata Classics, Profil Medien, etc.), licensing the recordings for release in various markets worldwide.

As a subdivision of the MICL, the Music Lithuania export project organises the representation of Lithuanian music industry at the international music trade fairs (such as MIDEM, WOMEX, Classical:NEXT, Popkomm, Musikmesse Frankfurt). It also collects and distributes export-related information about the industry to Lithuanian music professionals and vice versa – keeps international music industry professionals up to date on the new developments in the Lithuanian music industry. MICL also runs an e-shop for Lithuanian sheet music and CDs by Lithuanian composers.

== Leadership ==
1996-1997 – Eglė Sausanavičiūtė
1997-2000 – Daiva Parulskienė
2000-2001 – lt:Linas Paulauskis
2001-2007 – Daiva Parulskienė
2007-2014 – lt:Linas Paulauskis
2014–present Asta Pakarklytė
