= Vidmantas Bartulis =

Lithuanian composer (1954–2020)

- Born: 3 April 1954; Kaunas, Lithuanian SSR, Soviet Union
- Died: 29 January 2020 (aged 65); Palanga, Lithuania
- Occupation: Composer

Vidmantas Bartulis (3 April 1954 – 29 January 2020) was a Lithuanian composer, and a recipient of the Lithuanian National Prize (1998).

Bartulis's works include Missa brevis and the oratorio Nelaimelis Jobas (2003).
