= Vytautas Barkauskas =

Lithuanian composer (1931–2020)

Vytautas Barkaukas
- Born: 25 March 1931; Kaunas
- Died: 25 April 2020 (aged 89); Vilnius
- Occupations: Composer; Academic teacher
- Organization: Lithuanian Academy of Music and Theatre
- Awards: Lithuanian National Prize for Culture and Arts

Vytautas Barkauskas (25 March 1931 – 25 April 2020) was a Lithuanian composer and Professor of Composition of the Lithuanian Academy of Music and Theatre.

== Life and career ==
Barkauskas was born in Kaunas. He studied music at the Vilnius Conservatory with Antanas Račiūnas, a pupil of Nadia Boulanger. He also studied mathematics at the university's pedagogical institution. He achieved a degree in mathematics in 1953 and in composition in 1959. He taught at the conservatory from 1961 to 1974, again as a professor of composition from 1989.

Barkauskas was one of the most active avant-garde composers in Lithuania in the 1960s, influenced by Krzysztof Penderecki, Witold Lutosławski and György Ligeti. He moved later towards more intuitively arranged sounds, and writing more chamber music. "I do not restrict myself to any single, defined compositional system, but am constantly searching for a natural stylistic synthesis. I strive to make my music expressive, emotional and of a concerto type", he said.

His works have been performed at international festivals, competitions and concerts in various European, American and Asian countries, and have been interpreted by Yuri Bashmet, Juozas Domarkas, Lothar Faber, David Geringas, Joachim Greiner, Gidon Kremer, Raimundas Katilius, Ruth Palmer and others.

In 2000, his composition Journey of the Princess. Fairy Tale, Op. 114, was awarded the prize of the composers' competition dedicated to on the occasion of the 125th anniversary of birth of Mikalojus Konstantinas Čiurlionis. Barkauskas was awarded the Lithuanian State Prize in 2003. His symphonic work At the End is the Beginning, Op. 115, was awarded the prize at the Sinfonia Baltica International Composers' Competition in 2001. In 2003, the composer was awarded the Lithuanian National Prize for Culture and Arts. In 2005, he received the prize for the best chamber work, for Echoes for percussion solo, from the composers' competition organized by the Lithuanian Composers' Union.

Barkauskas died on 25 April 2020.

== Works ==
Barkauskas composed operas, symphonies, a viola concerto and a concerto for piano and strings, and chamber music, among others. Many of his compositions were published by Sikorski. Some works, such as Drei Fragmente für Violoncello und Bratsche, were published by the Friedrich Hofmeister Musikverlag.

List of Currently Available Works:

Large Ensemble works

Stabat Mater for Mixed Choir (SSAATTBB)

Chamber works

Sextet for piano, 2 violins, viola, violoncello and double bass

Duo for Guitar and Piano

Trys Fragmentai (Drei Fragmente), op. 134 for String Duet (Cello and Viola)

Trio Op.92 for Violin, Clarinet and Piano

Suite de concert op. 98 for Cello and Piano

Solo works

Monolog für Oboe solo

partita for violin solo

Kinderstücke für Klavier 1 (for Piano)

Kinderstücke für Klavier 2 (for Piano)
