= Kęstutis Antanėlis =

Lithuanian composer (1951–2020)

Kęstutis Antanėlis (28 March 1951 – 12 October 2020) was a Lithuanian composer, architect, and sculptor.

== Career ==
Kęstutis Antanėlis was born in Vilnius. In 1975 he graduated from Vilnius Gediminas Technical University (former V.I.S.I.) and later from the Vilnius Academy of Fine Arts. As an architect he designed buildings, interiors, furniture (the Republic of Lithuania credentials Hall, 1995), and a stained-glass office building. As an artist he created various sculptures.

As a composer he wrote nearly 200 songs and about 80 instrumental pieces. In 1971 he was the first in Europe and the second in the world to stage the Andrew Lloyd Webber rock opera Jesus Christ Superstar.

He was noted for his work on the rock opera Love and Death in Verona, and staging and singing in Romeo and Juliet in Vilnius in 1982. In 1998, he performed at the Internationale Maifestspiele Wiesbaden in Germany. In 1997 he staged the opera Peer Gynt.

== Works ==
- "Love and Death in Verona, rock opera, libretto by S. Geda based on Shakespeare's drama Romeo and Juliet, staged in Vilnius in 1982, in 1988 in English in Madison, USA; new version staged in Vilnius in 1996 during the LIFE festival. Grand Prix of the International Music Festival in Wiesbaden, Germany, 1998.
- "Peras Giuntas, rock opera, 1995, staged in 1997 in Vilnius, with Navak; based on Ibsen's play of the same name.
- "The Four Lands of Rain, oratorio for symphony orchestra, choir and soloists, 1986, libretto by S. Geda.
- Cycle of 4 songs based on words by B. Brazdžionis, 1962-1972.
- About 200 songs. Author of many of his own lyrics.
- About 80 instrumental plays.
