= Juozas Gruodis =

Composer, educator, and professor

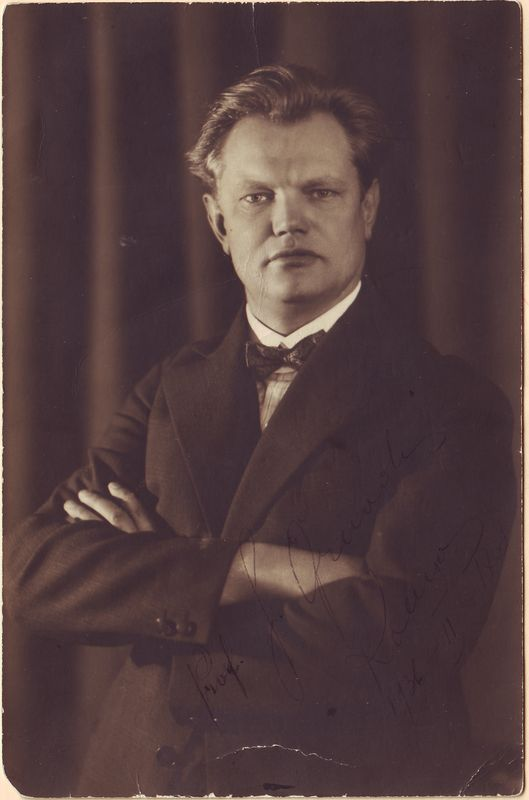
Juozas Gruodis

Juozas Gruodis (20 December 1884 in Rokėnai, Russian Empire – 16 April 1948 in Kaunas, Lithuanian SSR, Soviet Union) was a Lithuanian classic, composer, educator and professor.

== Biography ==
His father was a woodworker who also made musical instruments. He worked as a church organist until the age thirty. He then studied at Moscow Conservatory from 1915-1916, then studied composition and conducting at Leipzig Conservatory. After completing his time at Leipzig Conservatory, he then worked as a conductor at Kaunas State Theater, and starting in 1926, taught at the Kaunas Music School. The Music school was reorganized into Kaunas Conservatory in 1933, with Juozas being its first director and its first professor of composition.

Because of his influential years of teaching, Groudis has been called the founder of the Lithuanian school of composition. His students included: Antanas Budriūnas (1902–66), Juozas Gaidelis (1909–83), Julius Juzeliūnas (1916–2001), Vytautas Klova (1926–2009), Jonas Nabažas (1907–2002) and Antanas Račiūnas (1905–84). As a composer, Groudis found his own individual style through a merging of "moderate modernism and elements of Lithuanian folk music". A recording of his Violin Sonata (1922), along with other works for violin and piano, was released in 2014. In 2024 Toccata Classics issued a CD of his piano music performed by Daumantas Kirilauskas, including the Piano Sonata No. 1 (1919) and No. 2 (1921), and the Variations in B Major (1920).

== J. Gruodis Memorial Museum ==
In 1931, Juozas purchased a plot of land on the outskirts of Kaunas. He built a house on the site in 1932, where he would live with his wife until his death in 1948. The house was taken over by the Culture Department of the Kaunas City Executive Committee in 1967, where it would spend a few years as a music library, before the memorial museum of J. Gruodis was established at the site in 1974. The museum contains exhibits about Juozas's life, as well as several of his manuscripts.
