= Rock music in Lithuania =

Lithuanian appreciation of and contribution to the rock music genre

Rock music has been performed and heard in Lithuania since the mid-1960s. At first, repression by the Soviet authorities meant that rock was performed only at illegal gatherings, while music from the West was available on Radio Luxembourg or smuggled records. As pressure eased somewhat, rock musicals began to be released, such as Velnio nuotaka (Devil's Bride) and Fire Hunt with Beaters (Ugnies medžioklė su varovais).

Leading bands of the 1980s included Foje and Antis, and this period also saw the emergence of punk rock. Rock became less popular during the 1990s, although bands in a variety of genres were showcased in the annual Blogiausių grupių festivalis (Worst Bands Festival). A revival began around 2005, and prominent bands include SKAMP, the gothic rock band Siela, and the folk metal band Žalvarinis. A number of rock music festivals take place each year, including Mėnuo Juodaragis and Kilkim žaibu.

== 1960s-1970s ==
During this period, the Communist government of the Lithuanian SSR confronted rock music, which was considered a decadent and corrupting cultural invasion from the West. The younger post-World War II Lithuanian generation under Soviet rule had few means to get acquainted with popular Western music. One was Radio Luxembourg, the only radio station available on Soviet frequencies that played current, popular rock. Another means was to smuggle LPs of popular Western bands into Lithuania and copy them onto magnetic tape.

The Beatles were one of the first influences on Lithuanian rock musicians. The first local rock bands started to emerge around 1965 and included Kertukai, Aitvarai and Nuogi ant slenksčio in Kaunas, and Kęstutis Antanėlis, Vienuoliai, and Gėlių Vaikai in Vilnius, among others. Most of these bands did nothing more than play covers of The Beatles and Rolling Stones, sometimes adapting Lithuanian lyrics to these songs.

The dominance of covers bands started to change around 1968, when local artists started to explore original songwriting.

Such bands were popular at student parties, known as sessions. These parties were deemed illegal by the communist establishment, which considered them a corrupting influence. The most famous session of the time took place in Vilnius in 1971, when major local and Latvian bands performed before a crowd of several hundred - a huge number of people to attend such an event at that time. After the concert, its organizers were persecuted by the KGB.

In addition, a distinct genre of song formed during this period. Musicians like Vytautas Kernagis and Vytautas Babravičius created intimate acoustic ballads featuring their own lyrics and those of other Lithuanian poets.

Due to conditions imposed by the totalitarian regime, almost no records from this period survive to this day.

Despite the regime's stance against invasive Western culture, some musicals influenced by rock-and-roll managed to surface. For example, Andrew Lloyd Webber's rock-opera 'Jesus Christ Superstar' was staged by Lithuanian composer Kęstutis Antanėlis on December 25, 1971, at the Vilnius Academy of Art. It was the first staging of 'Jesus Christ Superstar' in Europe.

Lithuania's first and most popular movie musical 'Velnio nuotaka' ('The Devil's Bride'), written by Viačeslavas Ganelinas, was released in 1975. Its catchy melodies combine traditional folk motifs with a rock-and-roll rhythm. Spirited and emotional, The Devil's Bride tells the supernatural story of an impish devil who used to be an angel but got tired of singing Hosannah, and was thus condemned to live on Earth. From his home in a windmill, he pursued love and happiness in a hilarious and sometimes tragic tale of turmoil that affects the whole countryside.

Shortly afterwards, in 1976, another musical was staged. 'Ugnies medžioklė su varovais', with the music of composer Giedrius Kuprevičius and participation of Vytautas Kernagis and Gintarė Jautakaitė. This musical proved to be a huge success - during the period from 1976 to 1983 it was performed 185 times in cities and towns across Lithuania and the Soviet Union.

== 1980s ==
The emergence of home-grown rock and pop music in the 1960s and 70s was built upon with enthusiasm in the 1980s, during which time several influential Lithuanian bands emerged.

=== Hiperbolė ===
Somewhere around 1982 the band Hiperbolė started to gain popularity on the dancefloors of Lithuania. They played melodic tunes comparable to those of British band Smokie. Eventually, under heavy Soviet scrutiny, the group split up in 1985 but made a well-received comeback, with an album and several concerts, in 1996. They split up again in 1999.

=== Foje ===
1983 saw the emergence of one of the most famous, influential and popular Lithuanian rock groups, Foje. The group cited several influences, including the sound of The Stranglers, as well as the 1980s post-punk movement (for example the notable nod to Depeche Mode on Foje's 1990 electronica album Žodžiai į Tylą). These influences were combined with the often gloomy, desperate lyrics of the band's mastermind Andrius Mamontovas.

Foje became stars of national importance in 1986 after their appearance in the festival Lituanica 86 and a musical movie Kažkas Atsitiko (Something Happened). The group retained their star status until their split in 1997. Their farewell show in Vilnius on May 17, 1997, was attended by some 60,000 fans. Frontman Andrius Mamontovas pursues a successful solo career to this day. During his two-decade career both as a leader of Foje and as a solo artist he has written and recorded more than 20 platinum albums, as well as masterminding the Eurovision Song Contest 2006 entry We Are the Winners by LT United .

=== Antis ===
Antis was formed by a group of young architects in 1984. At their inception the band, led by frontman Algirdas Kaušpėdas, engaged in punkish experiments, but things changed considerably in early 1986 when the group developed an impressive horns section.

Petras Ubartas became responsible for the music of the band while Kaušpėdas concentrated on writing lyrics, which were full of irony and satire on the Soviet way of life.

Antis began to play in various semi-underground events and soon became well known across the country - not least for their extravagant glam image. But the real hour of glory struck for Antis after they played in rock festival Lituanica 86.

Although the music of Antis embraced many aspects of new wave, they developed a unique and original style and sound of their own. Despite this, one of the group's biggest ever hits was Zombiai, a reworked cover of Men at Work song Down Under. In their late period, Antis began experimenting with complicated and hard-to-grasp jazz-rock structures.

The band released their first album in 1987, followed by their second and last in 1989 before the group split in 1990.

Antis staged many live shows in front of huge crowds in Lithuania and the Soviet Union, and toured throughout Europe and United States in 1989/1990.

Antis' first comeback took place in 1996 when they performed three big concerts in major Lithuanian cities. The second comeback occurred in 2003 on the occasion of the release of their four CD anthology Visa Antis. In December 2003, Antis performed a sell-out concert in Vilnius - their last appearance on the stage to date. In 2007 Antis reunited and have released two albums since reuniting.

=== Bix ===
Another phenomenon of the Lithuanian rock scene, Bix was formed in 1987 in Šiauliai. Built on ska riffs with Latin beats and socially-oriented, brave and ironic lyrics, the group soon became one of the most interesting local acts.

Bix were also well received by European audiences during 1993–1994, particularly in France, thanks to their intense touring. However, due to the declining interest in rock music in Lithuania they practically ceased their musical activity. Now Bix give gigs with a reformed line-up (though the frontman Saulius Urbonavičius is the same) on an occasional basis.

=== Katedra ===
Katedra - best known Lithuanian heavy metal band that formed in 1986 and year later became one of the most popular bands at the time. Its first record Mors Ultima Ratio got pretty well known in Europe. Katedra's success ended in the early 1990s when singer Povilas Meškėla left the band, though the band is still active to this day.

=== Punk scene ===
1986-1987 marked the appearance of the punk-scene in Lithuania. Bands like Už Tėvynę, SKAT, and Erkė Maiše were citing old fashioned punk 77, while others like 33% kiaulių pakeliui į Vatikaną and Turboreanimacija were more inclined towards hardcore punk (HC) stylistics. Turboreanimacija can undoubtedly be regarded as the most influential HC band of Lithuania, which in its time was well received by such fanzines as Maximum Rock 'n Roll in the US.

Their first up-tempo albums reminded listeners of early records from Scottish hardcore legends the Exploited, while later Turboreanimacija embarked on the power-punk road.

Turboreanimacija was disbanded in 1997 after granting themselves status of a cult-band among the Lithuanian underground.

More recent acts of this genre are ska-punk band 'Dr. Green' (who are famous for their numerous DIY activities and intensive touring through the punk scenes of Europe), street-punkers Toro Bravo and hardcorists Bora and Mountainside.

== 1990s ==
The 1990s in Lithuania can be described as a dead period with regard to rock music. The audience began to lose interest in rock in favor of local pop music. Therefore, almost the entire rock scene, with very few exceptions, went underground.

The main rock music event of this period was the annual Blogiausių grupių festivalis (Worst Bands Festival), in which underground rock bands were presented with a unique opportunity to introduce themselves to the public.

Some bands of this period were trying to build upon the music scene emerging in Manchester at the time (e.g. Lygiai Lyja, Šiaurės Kryptis) - often fairly successfully; while others preferred grunge, noise and psychedelic experiments (for example, SH, Empti, Blyškūs Veidai, Summerland, Dogbones). Skylė from Vilnius became the favorites of Lithuanian philology students due to their often acoustic, intimate sound and poetic lyrics. Airija (the name is Lithuanian for Ireland) from Alytus skillfully combined rock music with Irish folk melodies. Leader of Airija Darius Mileris currently resides in Dublin, Ireland and plays similar music to that of his former band in an outfit called Nojus.

Also during the 1990s, Fun-Punk bands Kamštis from Utena and Armatūra from Vilnius had huge success.

== 2000s ==
In the early 2000s, several new names appeared on the scene, including Britpop-influenced Lemon Joy, Merlin and Biplan. Lemon Joy and Merlin drifted to the side of pop/electronic music shortly after the release of their debut albums, while Biplan have stayed rather successfully with rock.

SKAMP is one of the most popular bands in Lithuania since its inception in 1998 and is well known abroad. SKAMP blends Pop, Rock, Hip Hop, and Reggae genres into a unique alternative sound.

Pop-rockers Relanium formed in 1999. After signing a contract with Koja records, the band was renamed Laura And The Lovers. In 2005, Laura And The Lovers participated in the Eurovision Song Contest 2005 with a song titled Little by Little, but failed to achieve significant success .

2005 marked the beginning of the recovery of Lithuanian rock music. The number of rock festivals has increased while new bands are slowly finding their way into the Lithuanian media, not to mention the hearts of the listeners. These include funky Saulės Kliošas, Bitės, and Inculto; rockers IR, Brainers, Gravel, Sportas, Arbata amongst others.

The Lithuanian gothic scene is not very big, but has strong support from Lithuanian Goths. There are several bands representing this style. Siela and Mano Juodoji Sesuo are considered the pioneers of gothic music in Lithuania. Saprophytes, from the small town of Pabradė play emotional metal with lucid references to New York metallers Type O Negative.

Many rock bands claim folk influences. Žalvarinis is a folk metal band from Vilnius. Their music is typically very slow-paced with exclusively Lithuanian lyrics. Another folk-rock band Atalyja is worth mentioning in this context.

Annual rock music festivals include Mėnuo Juodaragis (summer festival of Baltic culture, alternative music, folk music and experimental music), Kunigunda Lunaria (gothic/darkwave/industrial festival in Vilnius); Naujas Kraujas (new bands' festival); Kilkim žaibu (Baltic folk, pagan and black metal festival); DevilStone (Extreme rock'n'roll).

== Labels ==
=== Zona ===
The first independent record company of Lithuania, Zona, started its record label operations back in 1991, with Baltic releases of artists like Joy Division, Pixies, Cocteau Twins, Dead Can Dance, Sugarcubes and many other notable foreign acts. Zona's work with local performers included releases from the most famous Lithuanian rock bands Antis and BIX, Russian cult bands Va Bank and Avia, as well as several compilations of young Baltic and Eastern European alternative artists. Zona's full back catalogue features a total of over 80 releases and co-releases.

In the late 80s to early 90s, the company's head, Dovydas Bluvšteinas, made efforts to organize concerts in Vilnius by such alternative music icons as Sonic Youth, Sugarcubes, Pop Will Eat Itself, The Fall and many others. That contributed remarkably to the establishment of an interesting local alternative scene.

Zona's efforts were finally recognized and rewarded in early 2006 with the 'Life-time award' by the annual local music awards Radiocentro Apdovanojimai.

=== Koja ===
Koja Records Group is one of the oldest and biggest record companies in Lithuania, founded in 1995 originally as a dance music label. Early on, the company focused not only on their local repertoire, but also on international licensing in Lithuania and other former Soviet territories. In 1998 Koja Records Group decided to exert all of its efforts on finding and developing local artists. Alongside this, the label has broadened to become a pop/dance-music record company.

== See also ==
Music of Lithuania
