= Roko maršas =

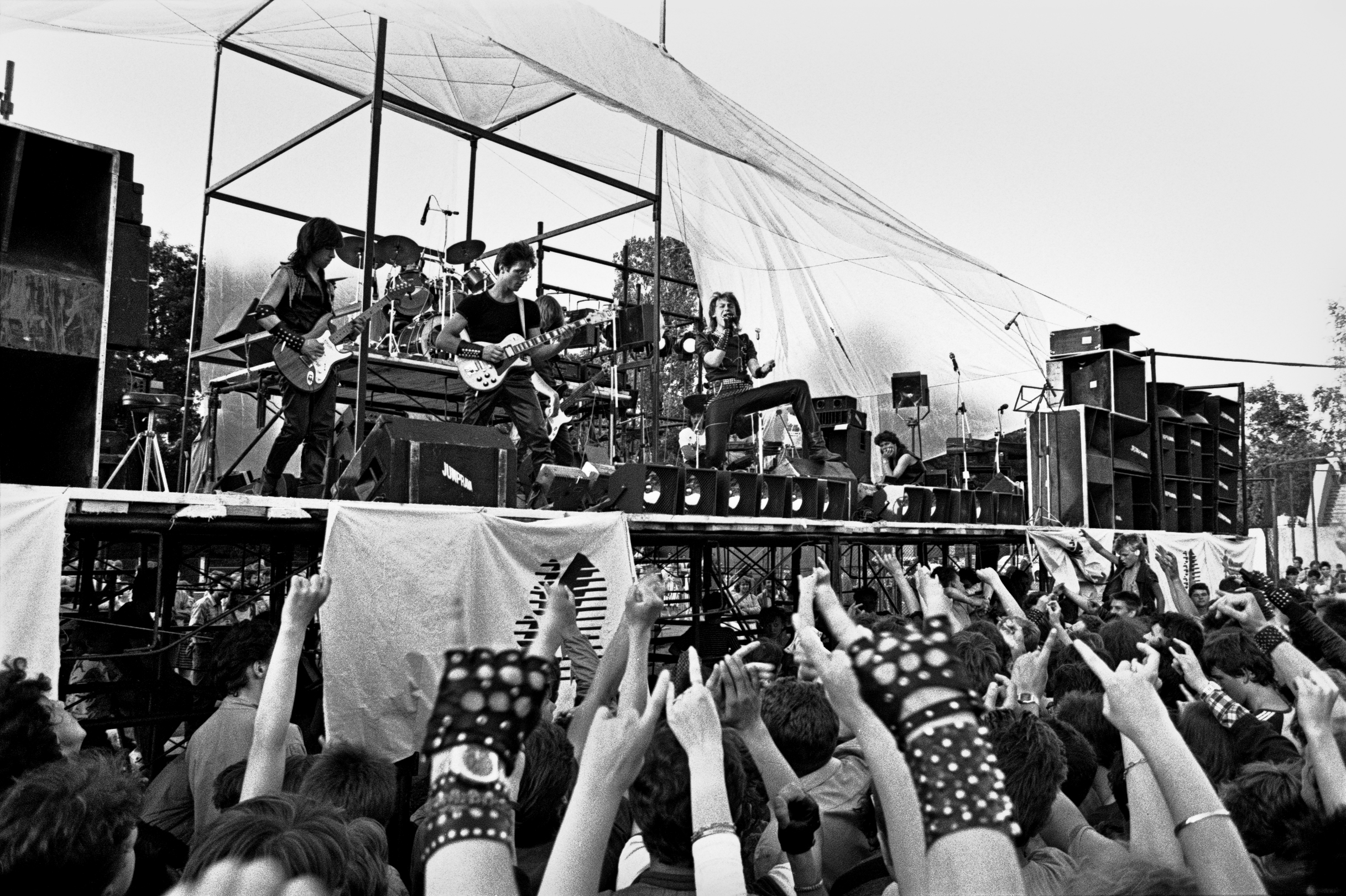
Katedra performing at the first Roko maršas festival in 1987 in Tauragė, Lithuania

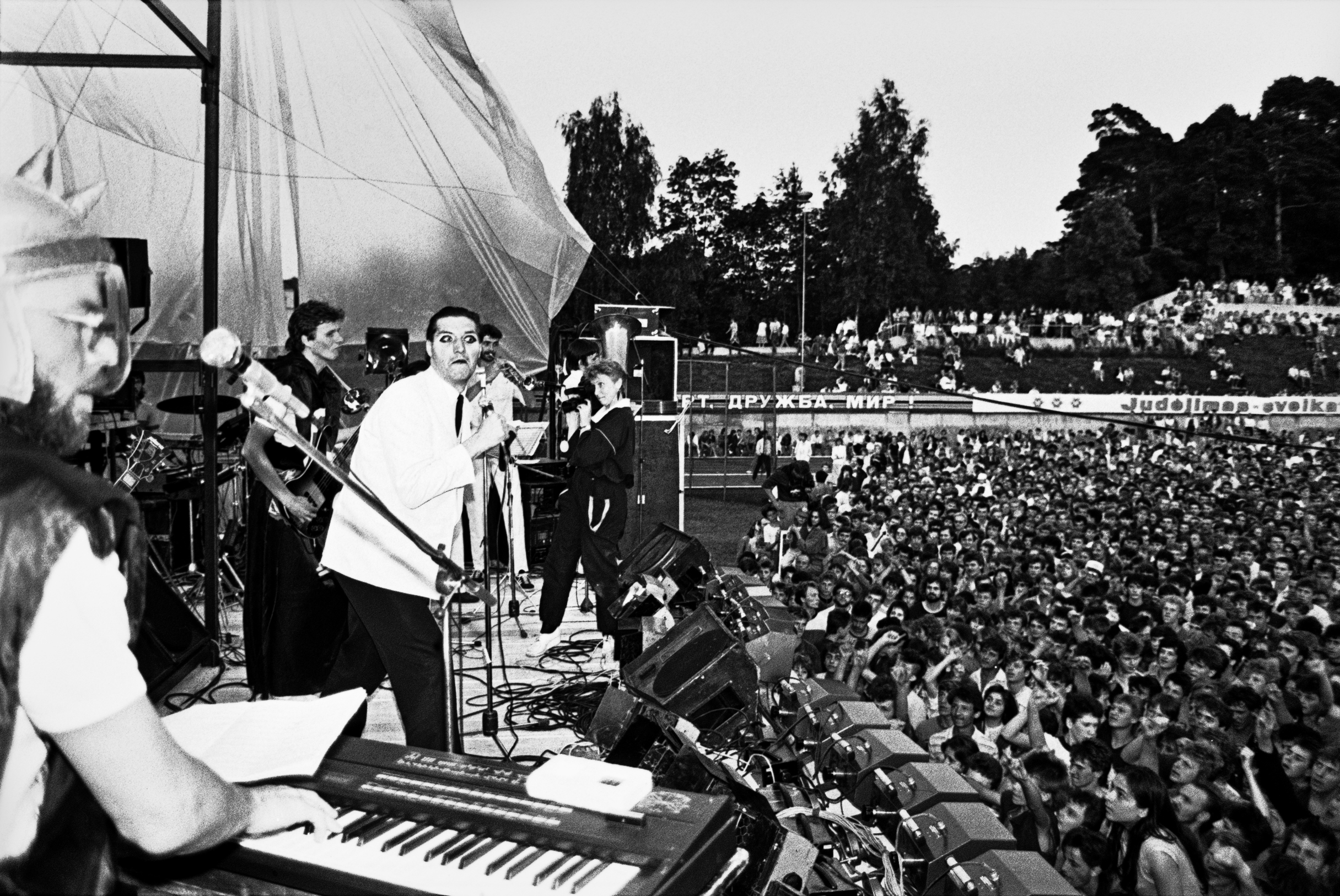
Roko Maršas in Vilnius, 1987. Rock band Antis is performing on the stage.

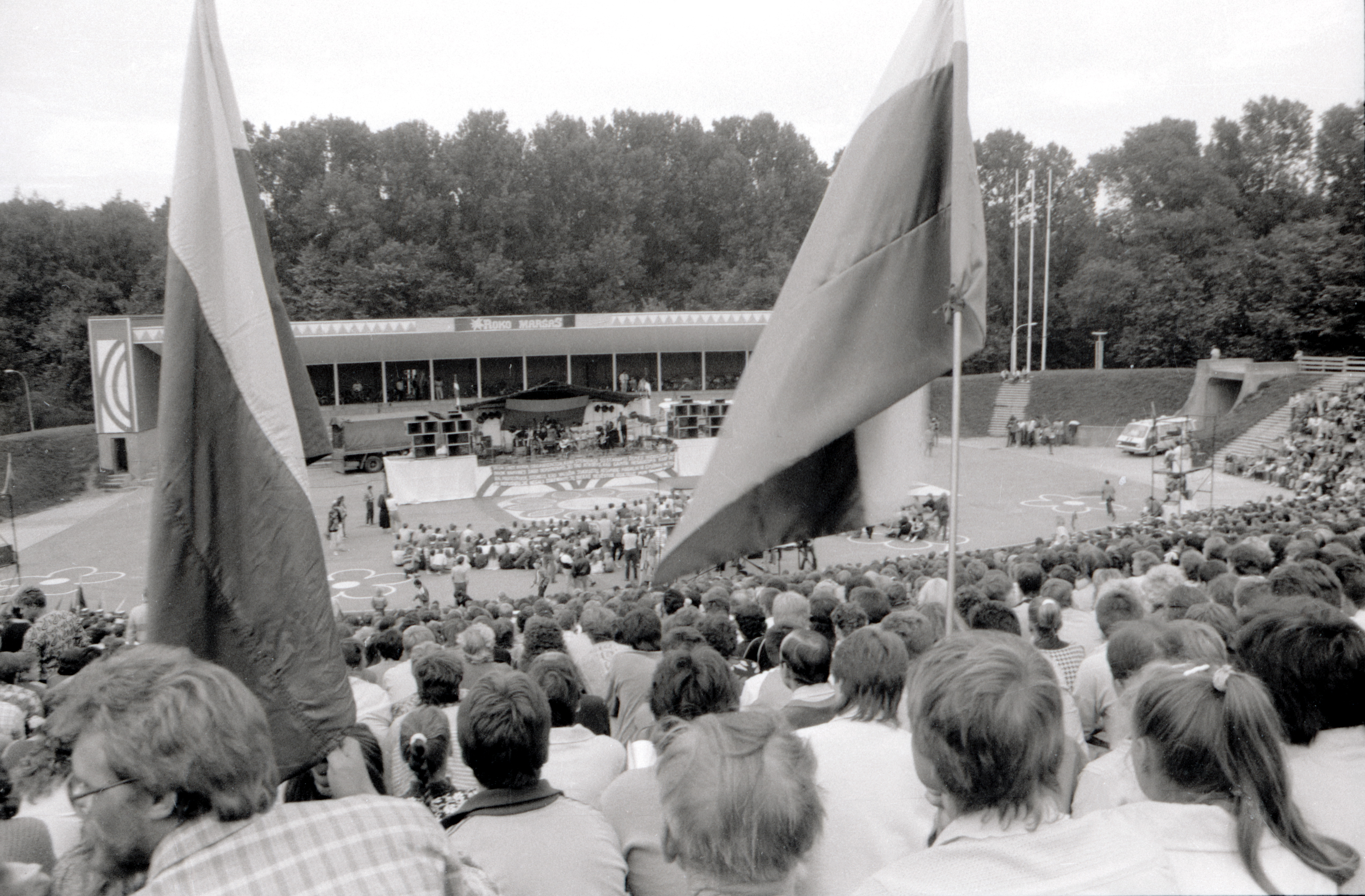
Roko Maršas in Kaunas, 1989. Its participants are holding the yellow-green-red tricolor flags of Lithuania.

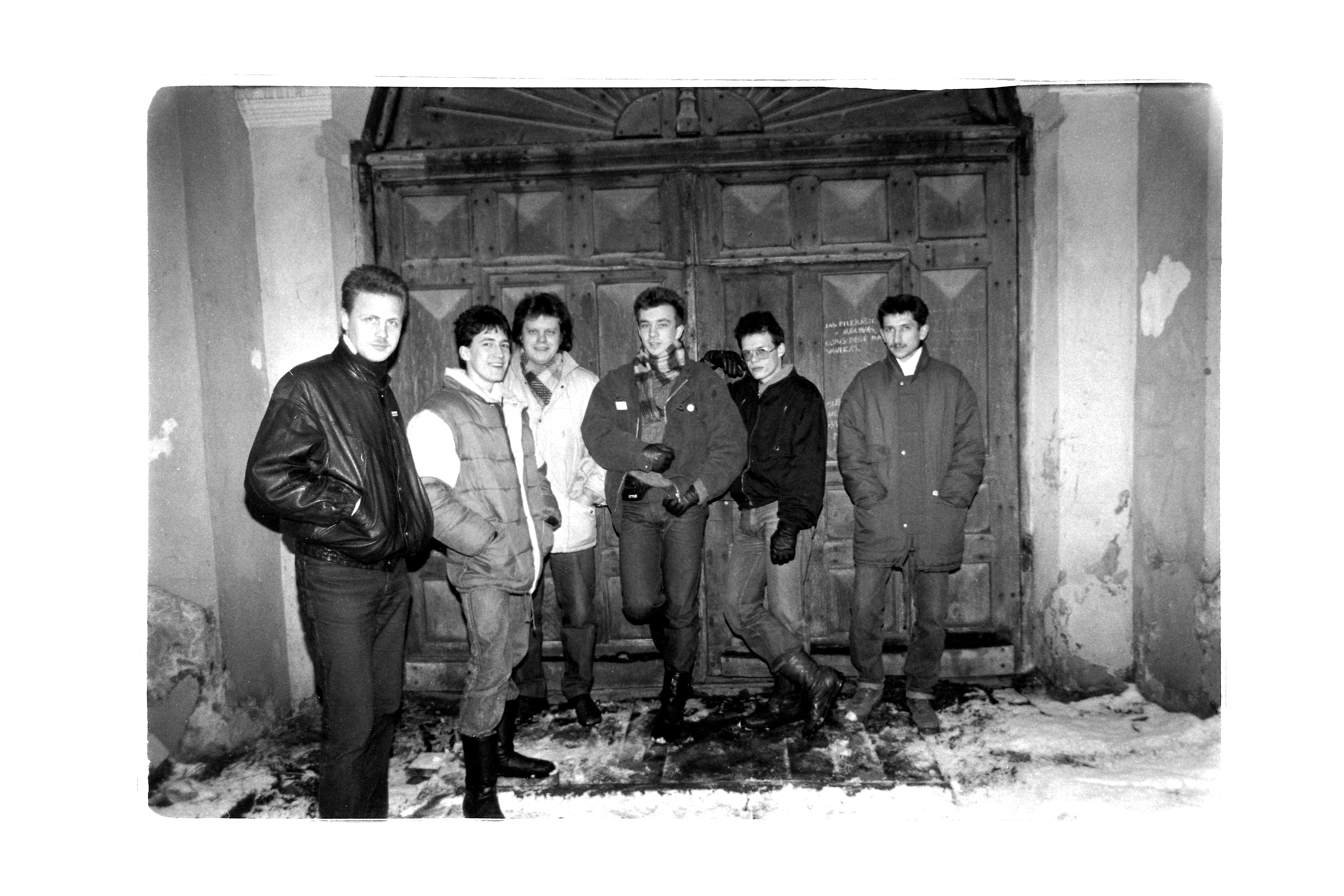
Group picture of the Lithuanian rock band Foje, among the protagonists of the third edition of the Roko maršas. Band's leader Andrius Mamontovas is standing in the center. Vilnius, 1987.

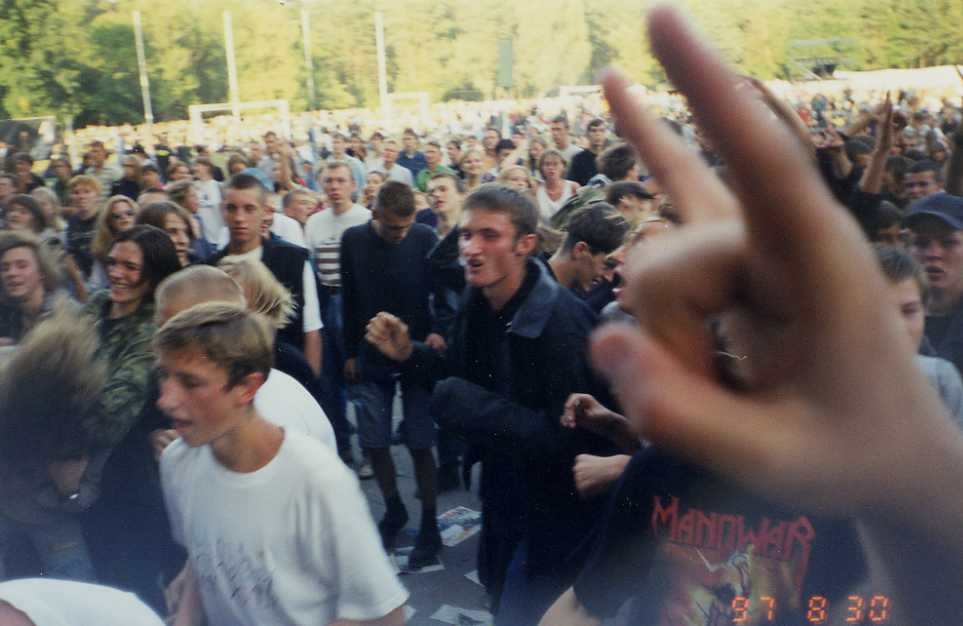
The last concert of Roko Maršas in 1997

Roko maršas (The March of Rock) was a rock music festival, organized in various cities of Lithuania between 1987 and 1989, and then resurrected in 1996 and 1997. The first festivals were organized while Lithuania was still under the Soviet occupation. They became part of the Singing Revolution, spreading ideas of the Lithuanian independence movement among young people. The first three festivals attracted an estimated 150,000 spectators, and became a rehearsal for the mass protest rallies by Sąjūdis that lead to the restoration of Lithuania's independence.

== History ==
Roko maršas was a rock music festival, organized in various cities of Lithuania. It was held in July and August 1987 – 1989, and was resurrected in 1996 and 1997. The first festivals were organized while Lithuania was still under the Soviet occupation. They became part of the Singing Revolution, spreading ideas of the Lithuanian independence movement among the youth. It helped to awaken the younger generation from Soviet-era apathy and inspire them. In total, the three first festivals attracted more than 150,000 spectators. The festivals became a rehearsal for the mass protest rallies by Sąjūdis that lead to the restoration of Lithuania's independence in March 1990.

The idea for the festival was raised by Algirdas Kaušpėdas, leader of the band Antis, after a successful concert Kažkas atsitiko (Something Happened) in 1986. The event encouraged various underground bands to become public. Other acts that participated more than once include Bix and Ramybes Skveras. Bands from Lithuania, Estonia, Latvia, the USA, and Canada all featured. The festival toured cities in Lithuania. The first installment in 1987 focused more on music without an obvious political message, while later installments had clear political agendas and featured speeches.

== Festivals ==
Year	Performers	Locations	Notes
1987	Ad Libitum; Antis; Bix; Katedra; Jumprava (LV); Ramybes Skveras	Started July 6. Vilnius (Kalnai Park), Kaunas, Tauragė, Kėdainiai, Šiauliai, Klaipėda	
1988	Antis; Bix; JMK folklore band Namo; Krasts (Latvia); Krimbel (Estonia); Už Tėvynę!; Ramybes Skveras	July 28: Biržai; July 29: Šiauliai; July 30: Mažeikiai; July 31: Tauragė; August 3: Kėdainiai; August 4: Klaipėda; August 5: Kaunas; August 7: Vilnius	The performers openly displayed the flag of Lithuania. Performances were accompanied by speeches by Arvydas Juozaitis and others on mainly environmental issues. The speeches also touched upon more sensitive political topics, such as the Soviet deportations from Lithuania.
1989	Antis; Dainava (Chicago, USA); Edis Punkris Band (Canada); Foje; Naujas kraujas (USA); Ramybes Skveras	July 28: Kaunas; July 29: Klaipėda; July 31: Mažeikiai; August 2: Šiauliai; August 4: Panevėžys; August 6: Vilnius	The performances were accompanied by political speeches that demanded withdrawal of Red Army troops and liquidation of other Soviet military objects in Lithuania. The speakers also discussed the Molotov–Ribbentrop Pact. The first Foje album, Geltoni krantai (Yellow shores), was distributed during this festival. Released the disc Roko maršas per Lietuvą '89 (Rock march through Lithuania '89) which contained the following songs: Aš gimsiu rytoj (I Will Be Born Tomorrow) by Foje, Lietuva yra OK (Lithuania Is OK) and Ašarėlė (Little Tear) by Naujas kraujas, Kodėl? (Why?), Kaime (In A Village), and Kareivėli ([To] Little Soldier) by Edis Punkris Band, Aš žinau (I Know) and Tik po audros (Only After Storm) by Dainava, Lietuvos valstybė (State of Lithuania) by Antis.
1996	Antis; Biplan; Bix; Dogbones; Lemon Joy; Mountainside	August ?? – Klaipėda, summer stage; August 29 – Kaunas, Darius and Girėnas Stadium; August 31 – Vilnius, field by Žalgiris Stadium	This installment promoted civic participation and involvement in the social problems with the slogan "Mums ne vis vien" (It's not all the same for us). Antis made a special appearance even though the band disbanded in 1990.
1997	Blues Makers; Dr. Green; Gin'Gas; Ruination; Spitfire; ŽAS	The final concert in Vingis Park, Vilnius. Other concerts included performances in Ukmergė (Culture House) and Pravieniškės prison (Spitfire and Dr. Green).	
