= Kurkliai =

- Town
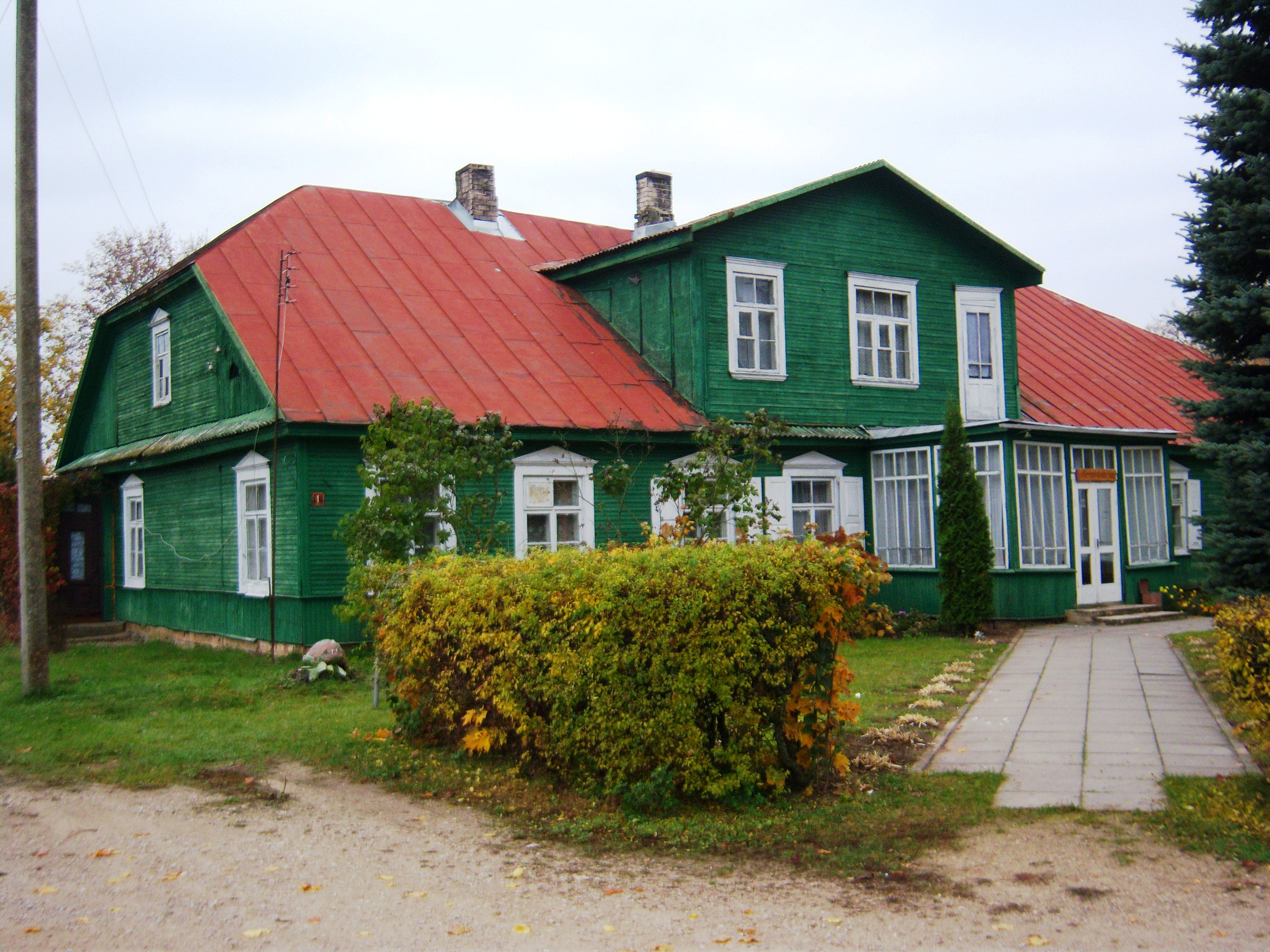
- Community House

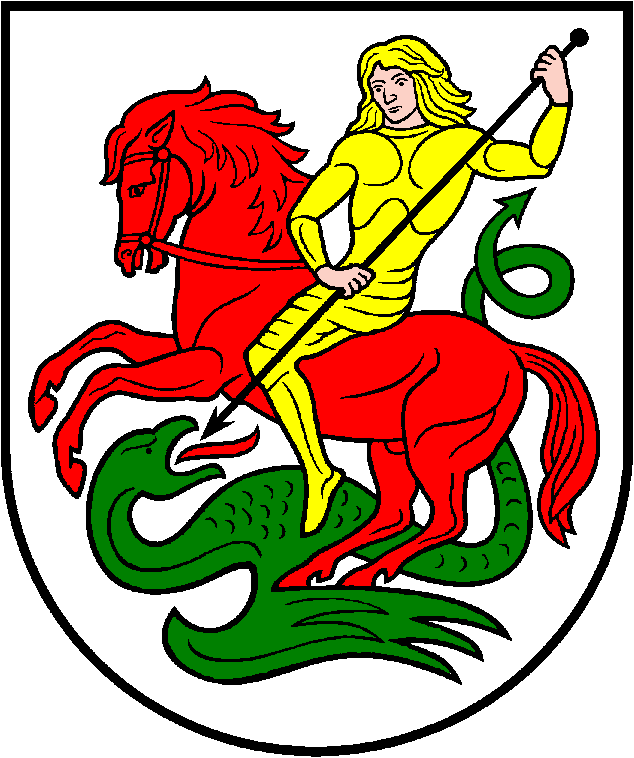
- Coat of arms

- Location within Lithuania
- Coordinates: 55°24′40″N 25°04′00″E
- Country: Lithuania
- County: Utena County
- Municipality: Anykščiai

Population (2011)
  - Total: 374
- Time zone: UTC+2 (EET)
  - Summer (DST): UTC+3 (EEST)

Kurkliai (Yiddish: קורקלע; Polish: Kurkle) is a town in Anykščiai district municipality, in Utena County, in northeast Lithuania. According to the 2011 census, the town has a population of 374 people. Center of eldership. In town there is Anykščiai Regional Park.

== History ==
The town had an important Jewish community before World War II. Jews of the town shared the fate of the Jews of Ukmergė and of the surroundings, who were massacred in a mass execution in the Pivonija forest on September 5, 1941. An old wooden synagogue is still standing.

== Gallery ==
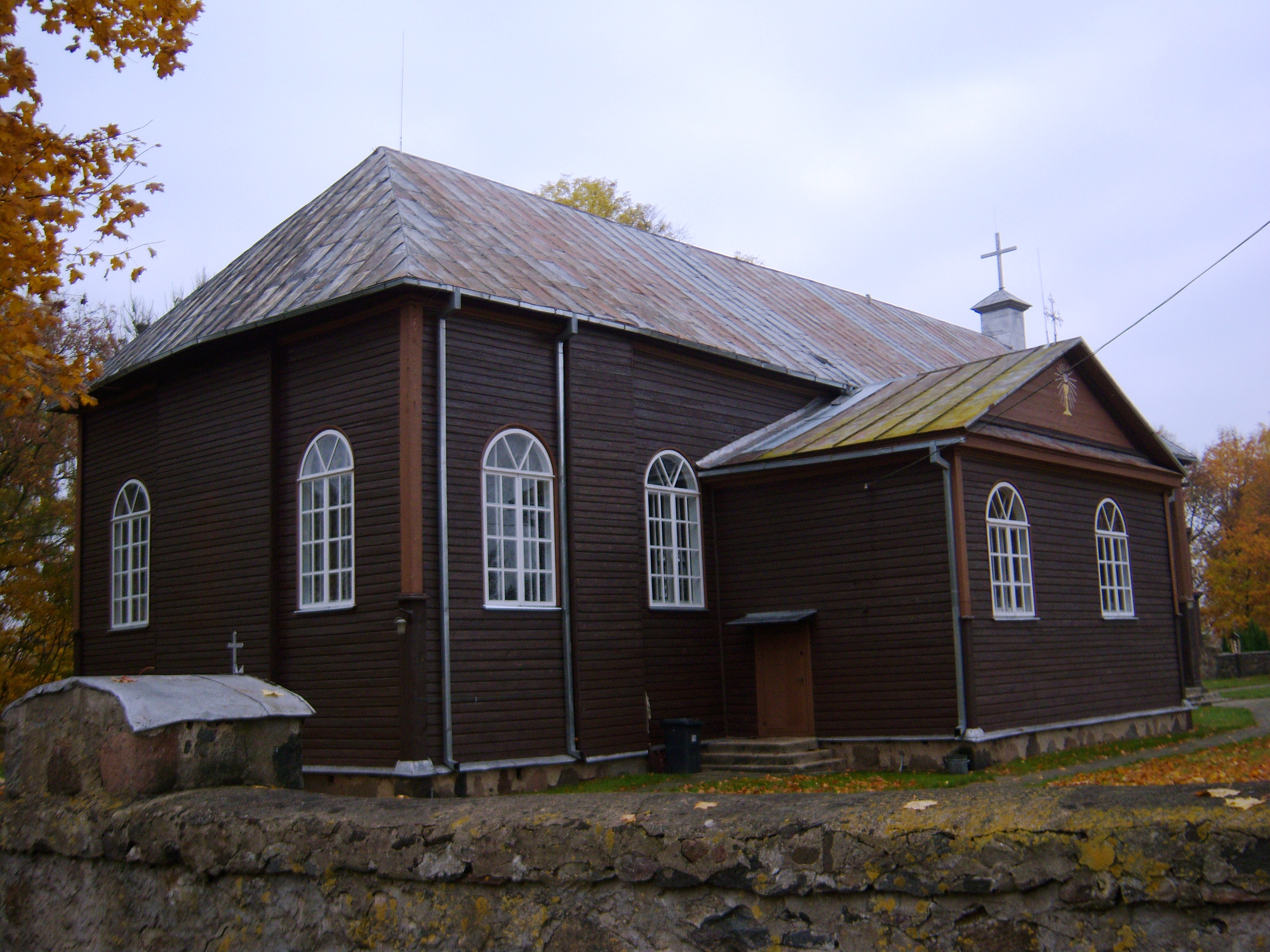
St. George's Church

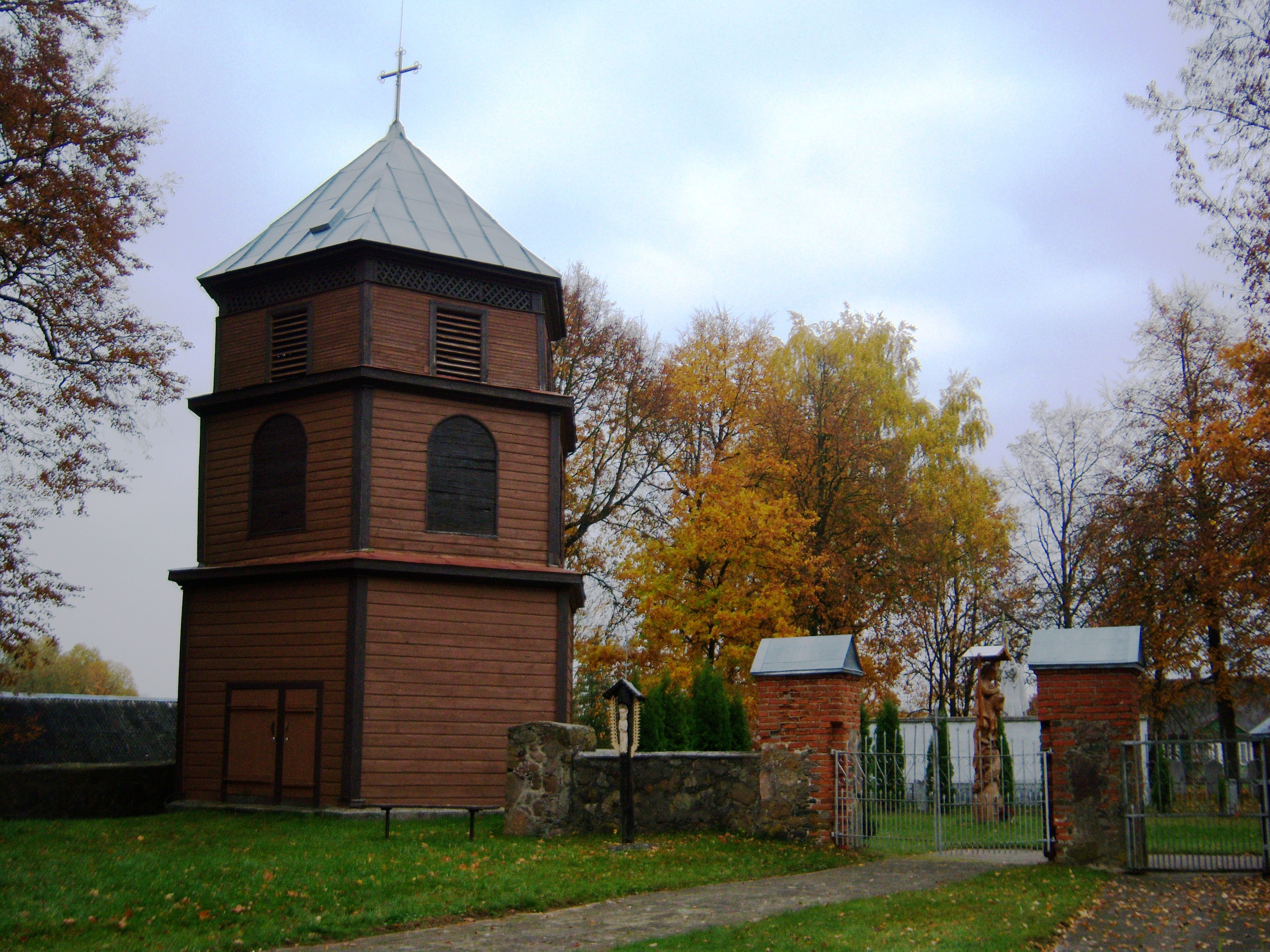
Church belfry

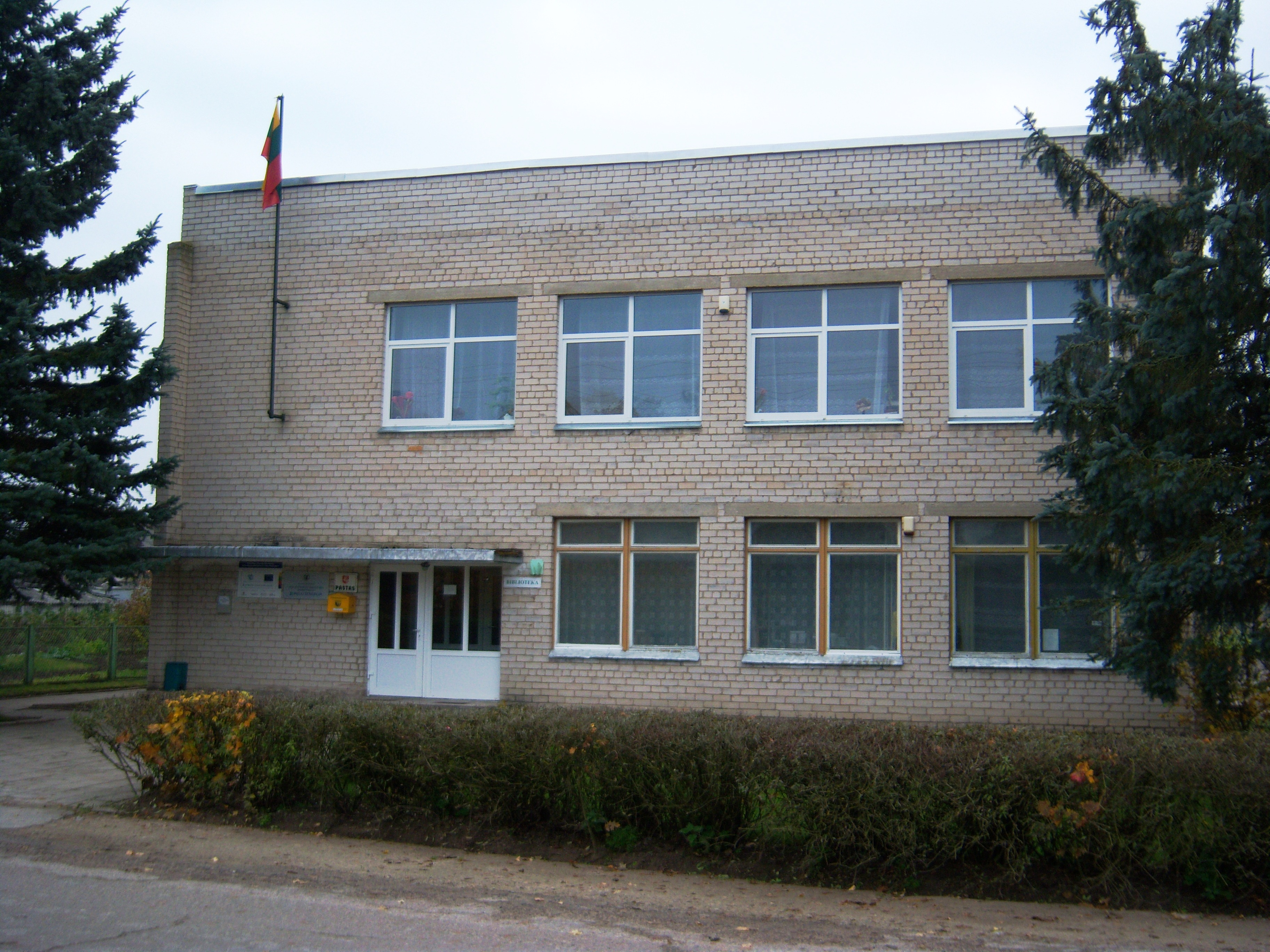
Parish

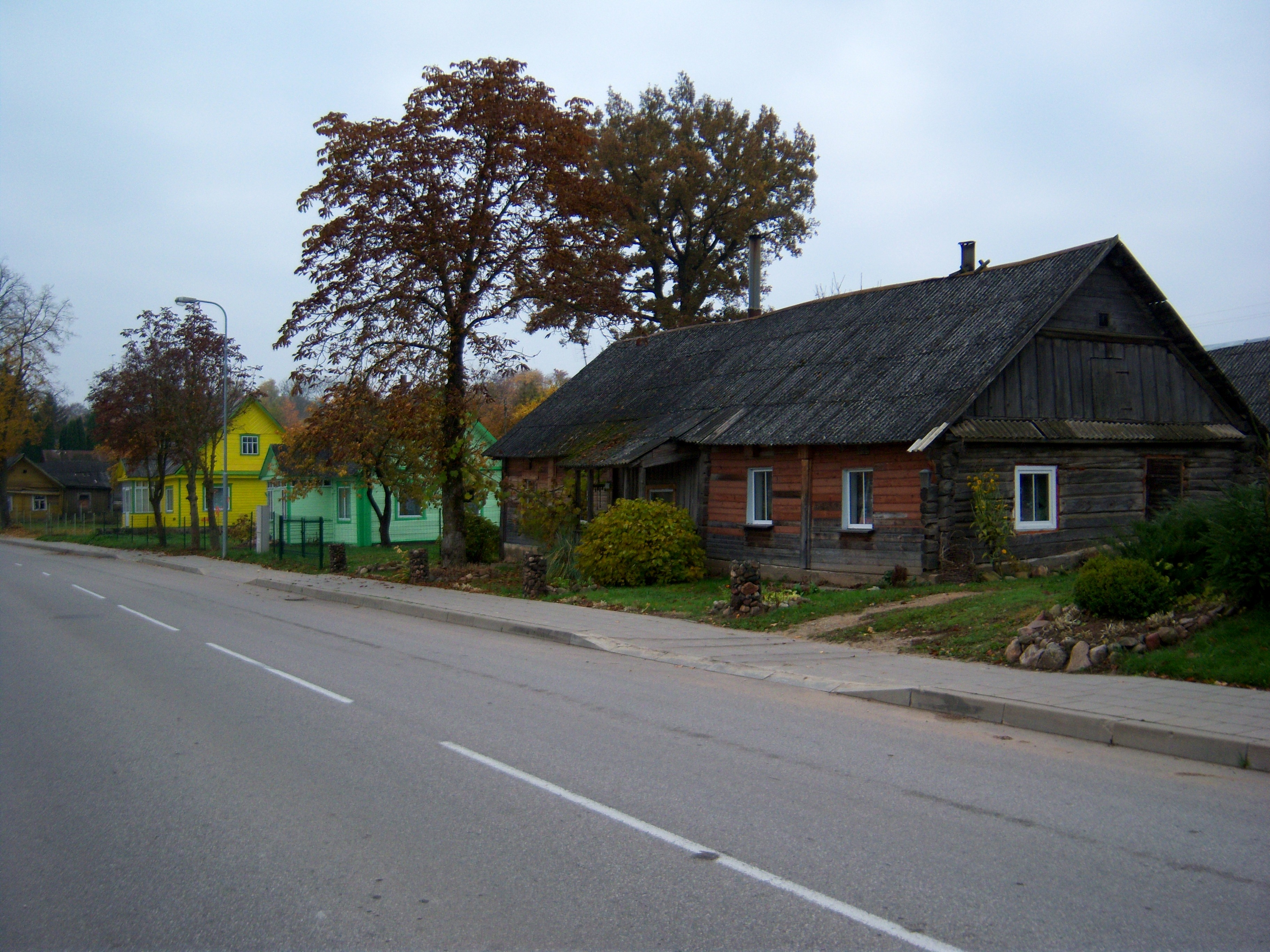

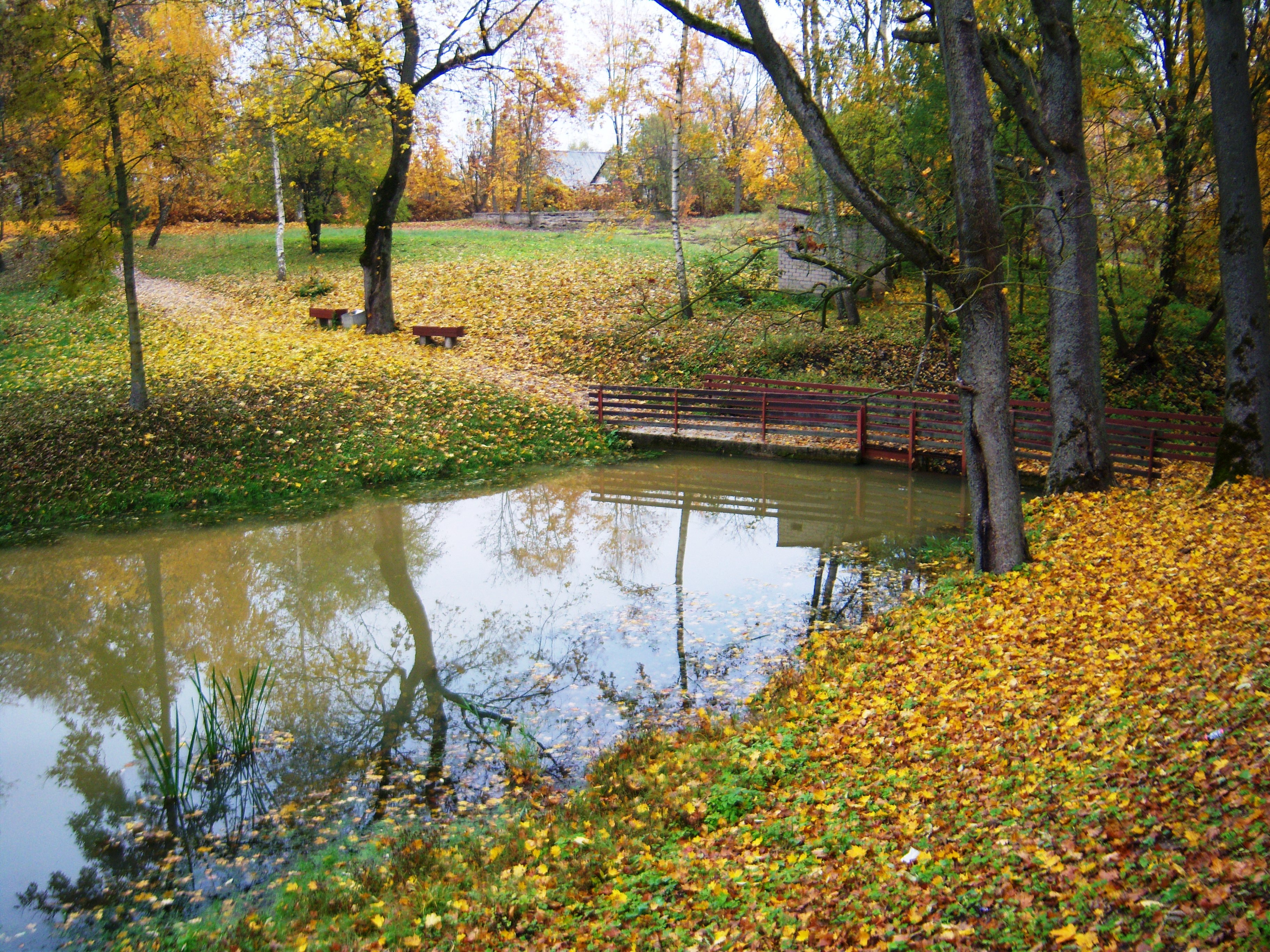
Park

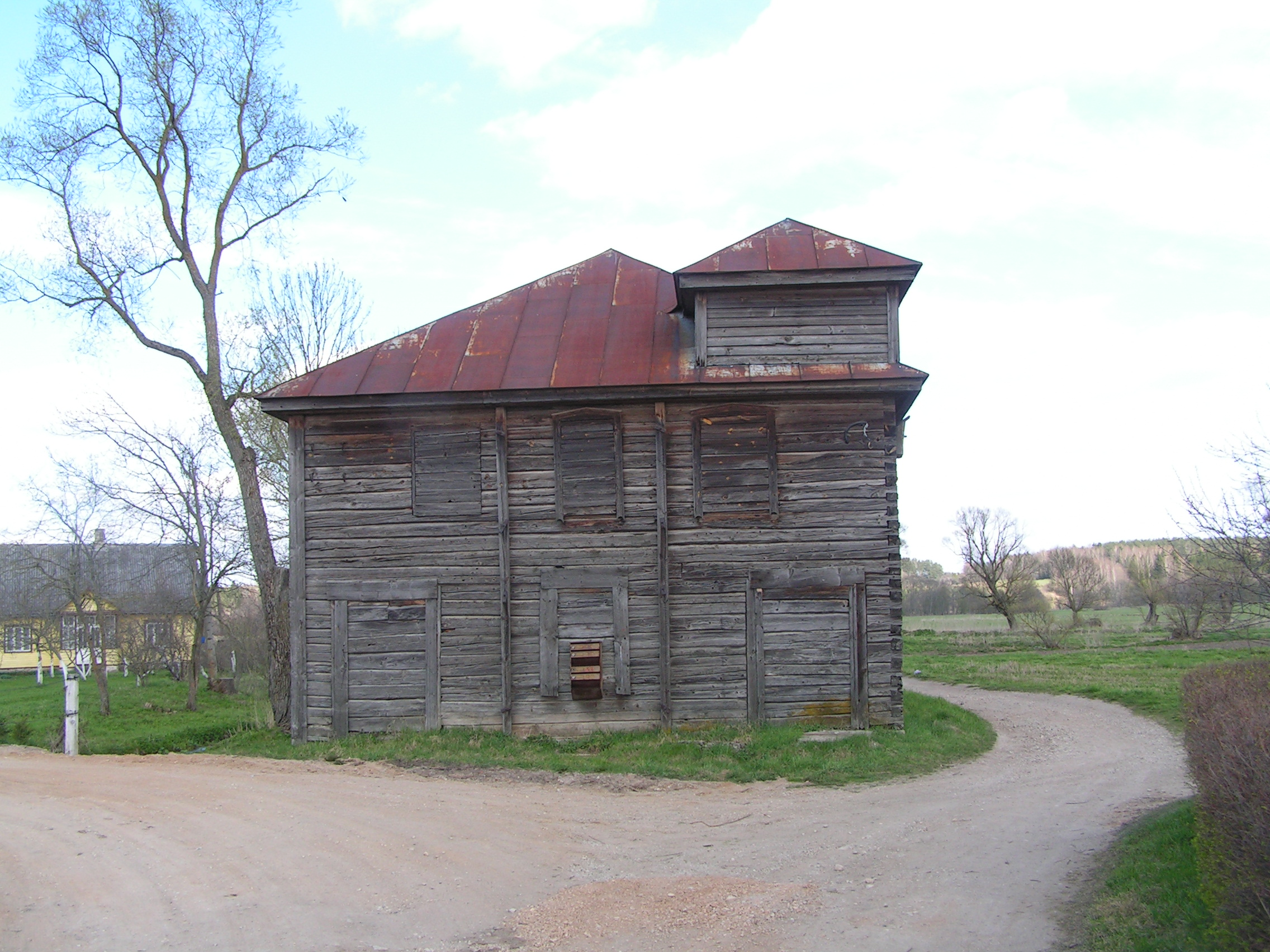
Synagogue

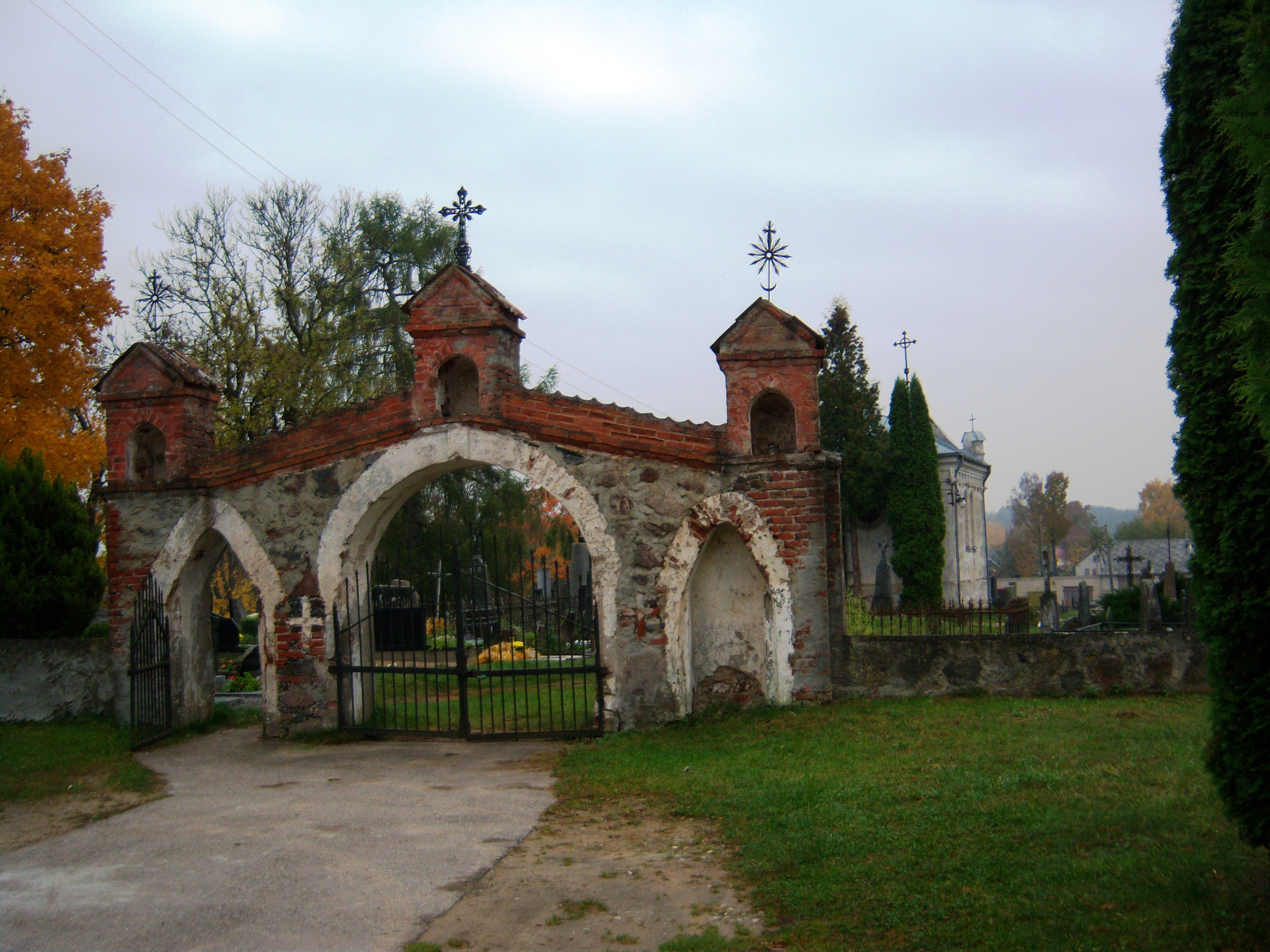
Cemetery gate

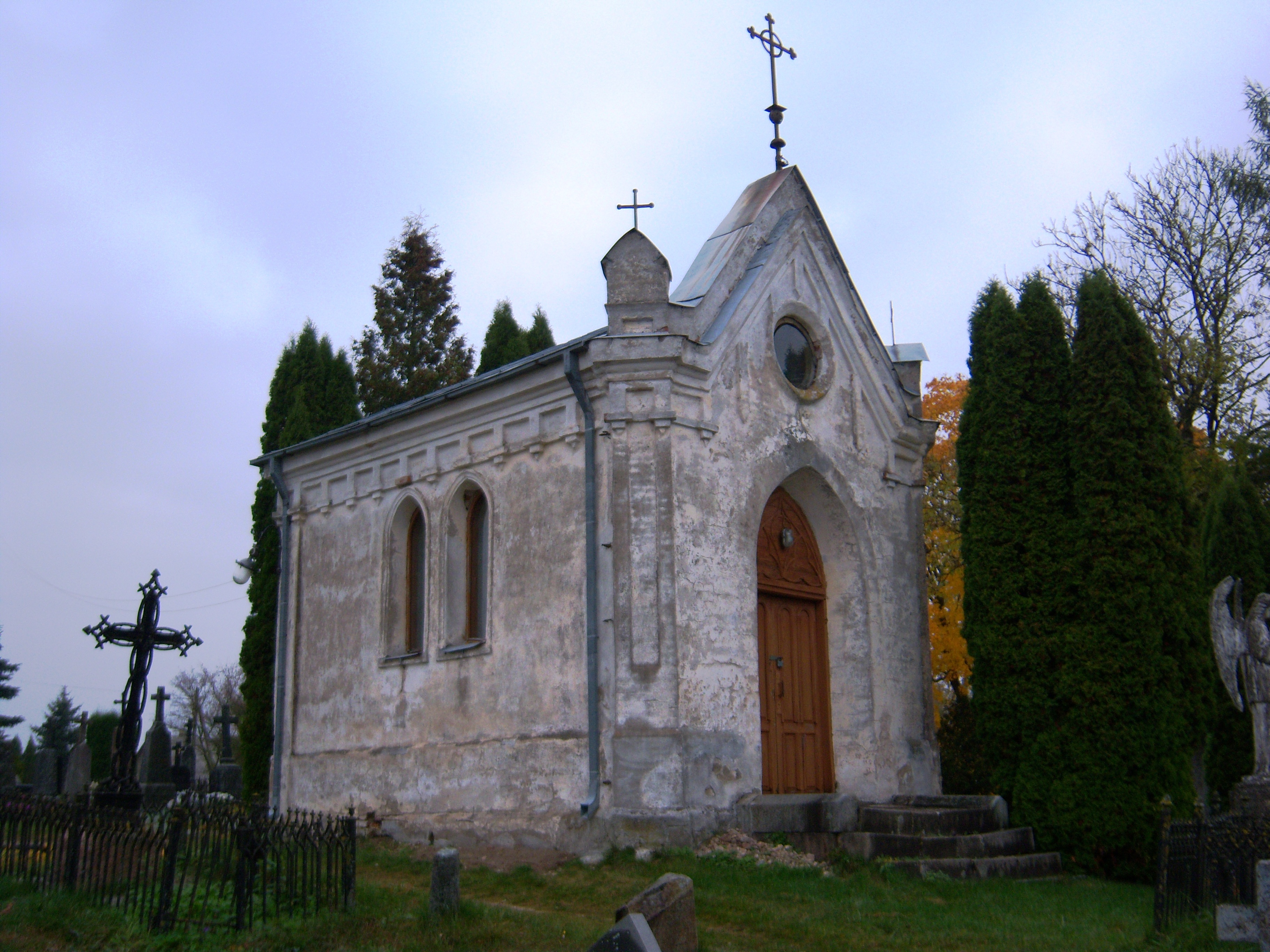
Chapel

== Education ==
- Kurkliai primary school

== Famous citizens ==
- Arnoldas Lukošius (1966-), member of LT United and Foje.
- Montague Burton (1885–1952), founder of Burton Menswear, one of Britain's largest clothing retailers.
