= Siela =

Lithuanian gothic rock band

- Origin: Lithuania
- Genres: gothic rock alternative rock
- Years active: 1990–present
- Label: M.P.3
- Members: Aurelijus Sirgedas; Darius Juodka; Kostas Kriaučiūnas; Bernardas Prušinskas

Siela is a Lithuanian gothic rock band founded in 1990 and still active today. The band's name comes from the Lithuanian word siela which means soul.

Siela was a pioneer of gothic rock in Lithuania. In 1996 their song Vėjas. Žvaigždė ("Wind. Star") became No. 1 on the Lithuanian music charts ("Radiocentras"). In the 1990s they also popularized songs such as Rudenio Dievas ("God of Autumn"), Tavęs man reikėjo ("I needed you"), Meilę skriaudžia dangus ("Sky harms the love").

In 2008 Siela released the album Euforija, which was positively evaluated by critics and contained songs designated for a wider audience. In 2009 Siela was nominated for the "Best Rock Band" award at Radiocentras Music Awards.

During their long history Siela played at various Lithuanian music festivals; they also played at Wave-Gotik-Treffen (Germany) in 1996 and 2004, as well as "Castle Party" in Poland in 2001. In 2010 Siela organized their 20-year jubilee concert with other Lithuanian musicians like Andrius Mamontovas, Alina Orlova, Lemon Joy, Thundertale, Mano juodoji sesuo. In 2011 Siela performed an acoustic concert at Vilnius St. Catherine's church and released a new album called Visa matanti akis ("All seeing eye").

== Members ==
- Aurelijus Sirgedas – vocals
- Darius Juodka – drums
- Kostas Kriaučiūnas – guitar
- Bernardas Prušinskas – bass guitar
- Aurimas Driukas – lead guitar

== Discography ==
- Vėjas nešantis naktį, 1990
- Prakeikimas, 1991
- Juodo opiumo žemė, 1993
- Už regėjimo lauko, 1994
- Sielininkai, 1995
- Tremtyje, 1997
- Tavęs man reikėjo, 1997
- Eldorado, 2000 (virtual CD)
- Dali, 2005
- Euforija, 2008
- XX, 2010 (compilation, various artists)
- Visa matanti akis, 2011 (live sound, Vinyl)
- “Vėtroje”, 2019 CD
- „Haliucinacijos“, 2026
