= Katedra =

Katedra is the word for cathedral in Polish, Lithuanian, and Ukrainian. It can refer to:

- The Cathedral (2002 film), a short animated movie by Tomasz Bagiński
- Chair (academic department), a type of a university department in Poland and Czech Republic
- Katedra (band), a Lithuanian heavy metal band
- Katedra (website), Polish website devoted to speculative fiction (reviews, interviews, news, etc.)
