= Arnoldas Lukošius =

Lithuanian keyboardist (born 1967)

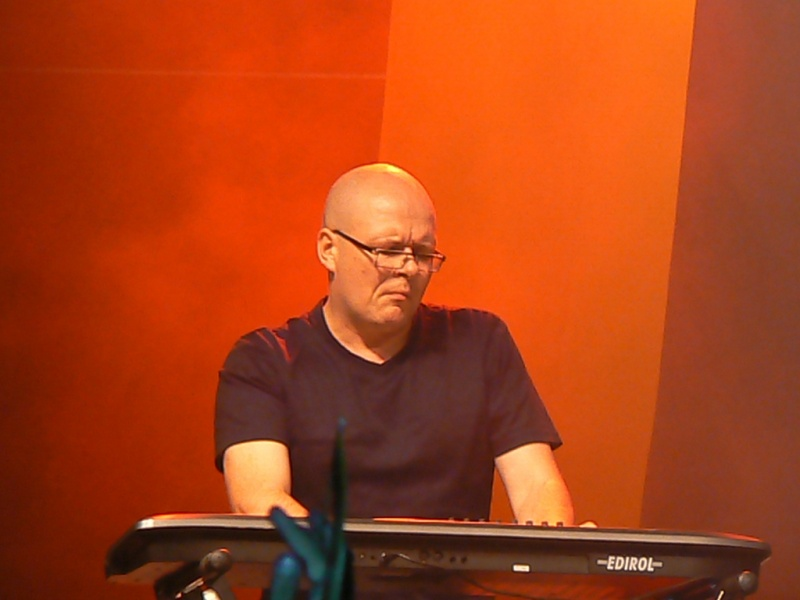

Background information
- Born: Arnoldas Lukošius; 11 February 1967 (age 58); Kurkliai, Anykščiai district, Lithuanian SSR, Soviet Union
- Genres: rock, pop rock, new wave, alternative rock
- Occupation: Musician
- Instruments: Vocals, Keyboard, Accordion
- Years active: 1983–present

Arnoldas Lukošius (born February 11, 1967) is a Lithuanian keyboardist, who has performed in a LT United band at the Eurovision Song Contest 2006. He is named by his colleagues as a "Lithuania's first rock accordion player". Lukošius has been a member of the legendary Foje band. Today he is the editor of a popular girls' magazine and also plays in the band of Andrius Mamontovas.

His dance in the Eurovision Song Contest, delivered after standing completely still and looking serious in the first half of the song, became famous because of its maniacal delivery, which, in combination with his physical appearance, was found amusing by many viewers.

== Lifestyle ==
Lukošius rarely eats at home and says that the refrigerator belongs to his wife.

Starting from 1997 year he worked as journalist and layout designer in then biggest Lithuanian magazine „Panele“. From 2010 he is reporter at news portal „lrytas.lt“, were covers IT and Science themes.

== Music ==
Arnold has rehearsed in the rock band Soul's rehearsal studio, with another group of musicians for the album "Black Opium Earth" program. He said that the "Black Opium Earth" is from the same era as when he was an active musician back in the 1993's. Despite the difficult living conditions at the time, it was one of the most productive periods in Lithuania, because the music was looking for new solutions. Arnold also exclaimed that "The Group" Movie and the gothic sound close to him.

== Related Online Videos ==
| # | Video | Uniform Resource Locator (URL) | Published Date |
|---|---|---|---|
| 1 | "Lietuvių šokiai" | https://www.youtube.com/watch?v=anmjobVNnag | March 29, 2010 |
| 2 | "Foje - Tušti delnai" | https://www.youtube.com/watch?v=Vx3WvXyWxcM | October 4, 2010 |
| 3 | "Foje - Ir aš dar gyvensiu (Tikras Garsas)" | https://www.youtube.com/watch?v=H0dx0-PPR-g | December 25, 2010 |
| 4 | "LT United - We Are The Winners" | https://web.archive.org/web/20120322220011/http://uzlietuva.lt/video/XGUMM8W9A2AY/LT-United--We-Are-The-Winners | January 14, 2011 |
