= Lemon Joy =

Lithuanian band

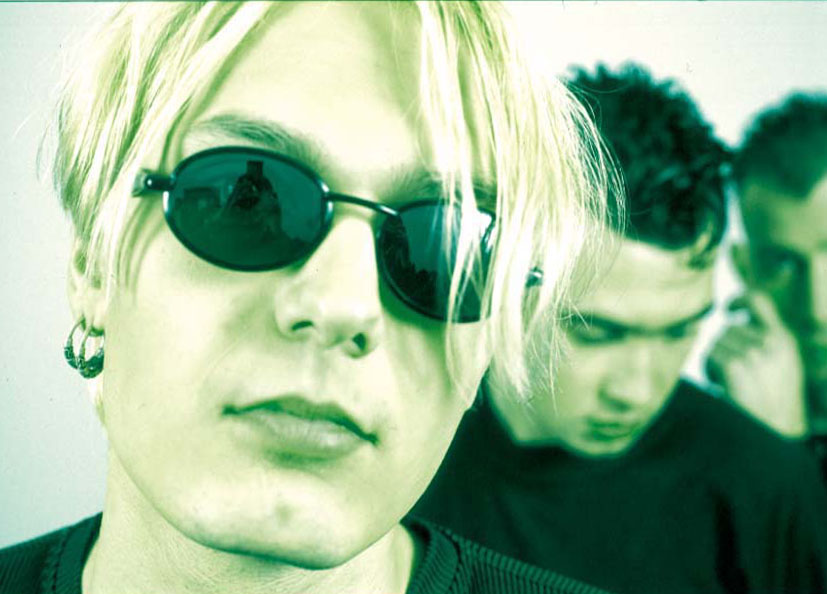

Background information
- Also known as: Этаж 3 Lemon's Joy
- Origin: Vilnius, Lithuania
- Genres: Synthpop; EDM; Electronic rock; Electropop; Italo-disco
- Years active: 1994–present
- Labels: Bomba; M.P.3.
- Members: Igoris Kofas; Olegas Semionovas; Rytis Rutkauskas
- Past members: Sergėjus Grėjus (1994–1998); Maksimas Bambras (1994–2004)

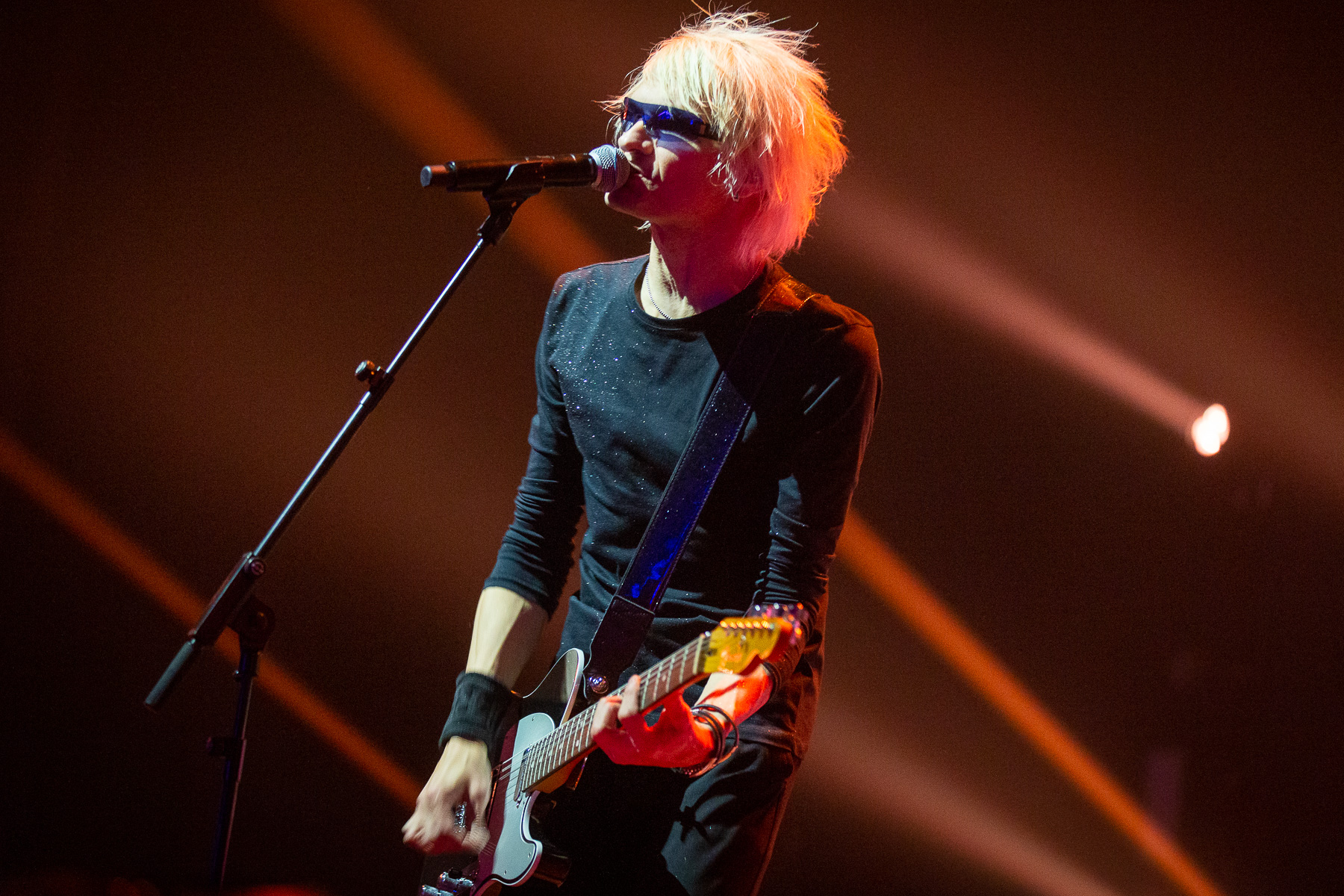
Frontman Igoris Kofas

Lemon Joy is a Lithuanian synthpop band formed in Vilnius in 1994, consisting of Igoris Kofas (vocals), Olegas Semionovas (guitar, keyboards) and Rytis Rutkauskas (drums).

== Biography ==
Lemon Joy, originally called "Этаж-3", was founded in 1994 by four Russian–Lithuanians Igoris Kofas, Olegas Semionovas, Maksimas Bambras and Sergėjus Grėjus. In 1996, the band was renamed to "Lemon's Joy" and soon played its first concert along with another emerging Lithuanian rock band Airija in Kaunas. During its early years, Lemon's Joy music focused on the gothic rock/alt rock sound, whose basis became distorted guitar riffs and prominent bass line combined with Igoris's emotional, dreamy lyrics.

The band won the so–called Baddest Groups' Festival in 1996 with their song "City of Berries", which had become a number one hit the same year in "Ultra Vires", one of the first commercial radio stations in independent Lithuania. Later that year, the band participated in the Roko Maršas, a Lithuanian music festival dedicated to rock music.

Up until the Roko Maršas, Lemon's Joy primarily played songs written in English; they decided to play their first Lithuanian single "Glostyk" during the festival and later released an album under the same name, winning a Bravo trophy (equivalent of the Grammy) for best first album.

In 1997, the band participated in "Rock Summer" music festival in Tallinn. The following year, the group was renamed to its current name and began to focus on electronic music after bassist Sergėjus Grėjus left the band.

In 2006, the group released its fifth studio album titled 1210, which was well–received by Lithuanian audiences and reached top positions in Lithuanian charts.

In 2011, the group released its seventh album titled "Stebuklas", whose Italo-disco single Kažkada topped the charts in several Lithuanian radio stations.

In November 2016, Lemon Joy released its latest album "Willkommen".

== Image ==
Despite the band's focus on electronic music production, Lemon Joy often uses electric guitars and drum kits on–stage to add a rock'n'roll element to their performances. Igoris is also known for his flashy costumes, accessories and blonde dyed hair.

== Albums ==
Title	Release year	Record Company	Notable Singles
Glostyk	1996	Bomba Records	City of Berries, Glostyk
Super	1998	Bomba Records	
Mylėti tave beprotiška ir keista	1999	Bomba Records	Mylėti tave beprotiška ir keista
REstart	2001	Bomba Records	Geltoni krantai (FOJE), Pamiršk mane (Hiperbolė)
Electropop	2004	Bomba Records	
1210	2006	M.P.3	
Stebuklas	2011	–	Kažkada
Willkommen	2016	M.P.3	Ylang ylang, Willkommen, Be atšvaitų
S	2019	M.P.3	Tavo rytojus
