= Katedra (band) =

Lithuanian heavy metal band

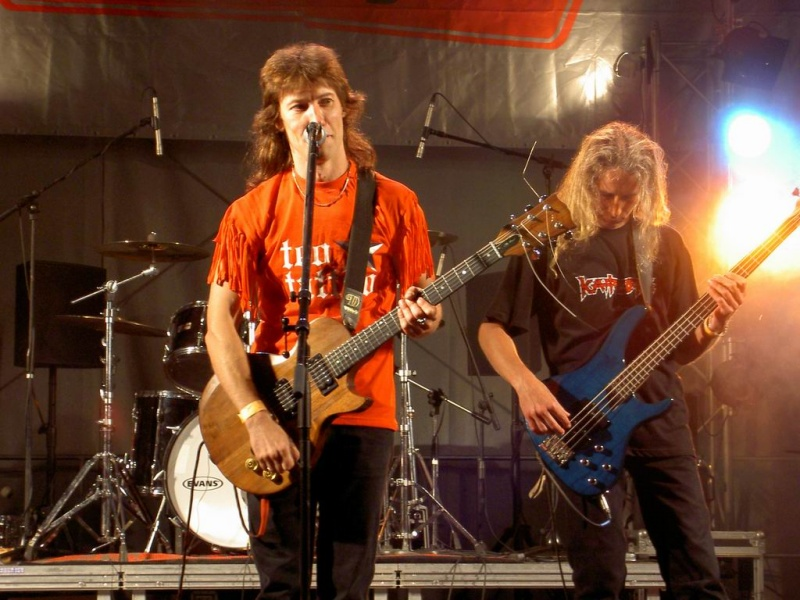
- Katedra performing at the 2006 Roko naktys festival in Plateliai, Lithuania.

Background information
- Origin: Vilnius, Lithuania
- Genres: Heavy metal, speed metal, thrash metal
- Years active: 1986–2019
- Labels: „Melodija“, Atra Musica Records
- Members: Ričardas Laginauskas; Rimantas Budriūnas; Salvijus Žeimys
- Past members: Povilas Meškėla; Romas Rainys; Marius Giedrys; Naglis Patamsis; Algimantas Radavičius; Domas Dėdinas; Gediminas Jurgaitis
- Website: www.katedrainrock.com

Katedra (Cathedral in English) was a Lithuanian heavy metal band, founded in 1986. From the outset, it was significantly influenced by the style of Iron Maiden.

In May 2019, the band announced they would be disbanding following their performance at the Kilkim Žaibu festival the following month on June 23.

== Members ==
=== Final lineup ===
- Ričardas Laginauskas – guitar, vocal,
- Rimantas Budriūnas – bass guitar,
- Salvijus Žeimys – drums.

=== Former members ===
- Povilas Meškėla – vocals (episodically also trombone),
- Romas Rainys – guitar,
- Marius Giedrys – drums,
- Naglis Patamsis – keyboard,
- Algimantas Radavičius – bass guitar,
- Domas Dėdinas - drums,
- Gediminas Jurgaitis - bass guitar.

== History ==
=== Beginning ===
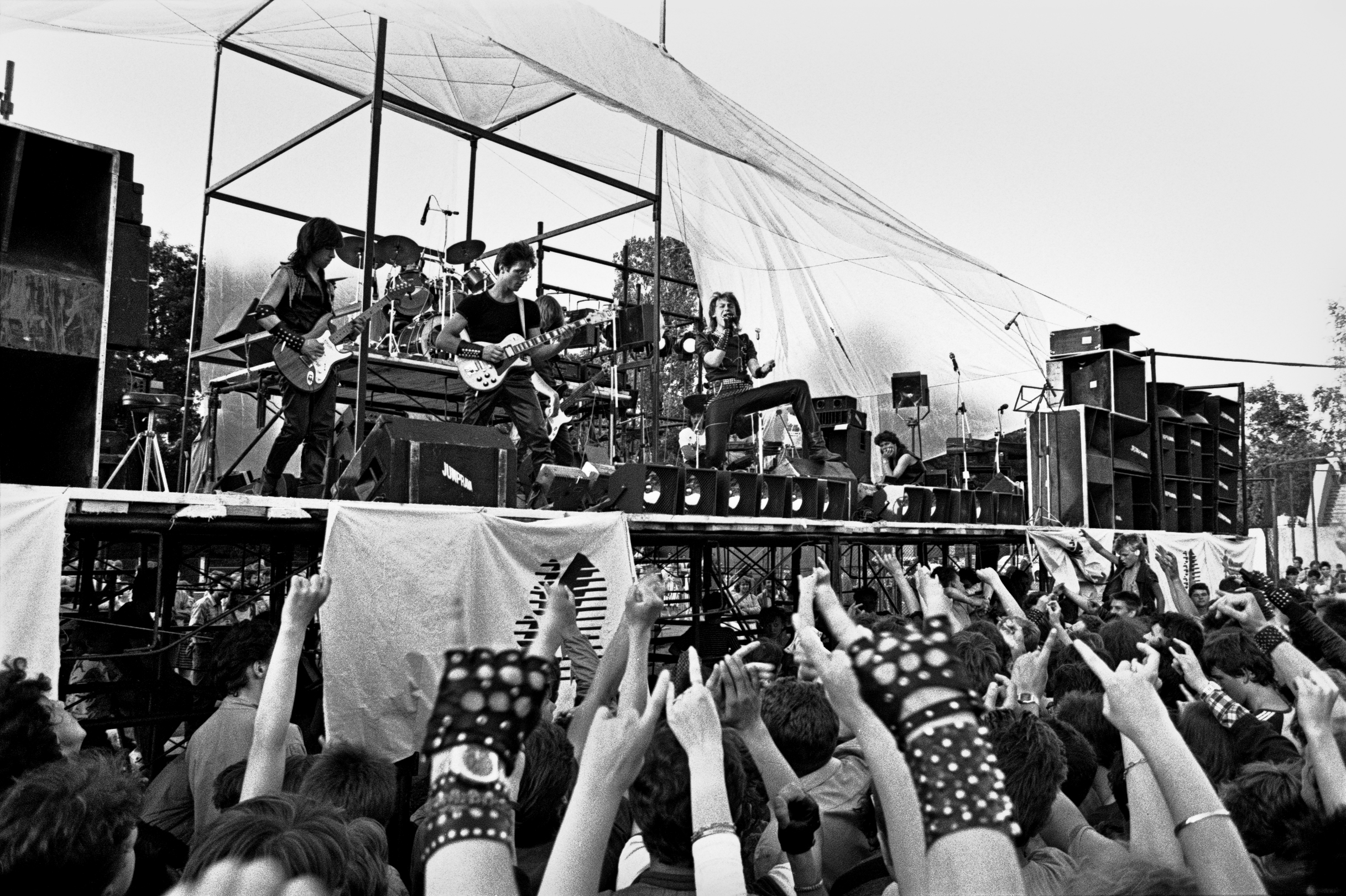
Katedra performing at the first Roko maršas festival in 1987 in Tauragė, Lithuania

In its first incarnation, Katedra was composed of the three musicians: Ričardas Laginauskas on guitar, Algimantas Radavičius on bass, and Marius Giedrys on drums. Later, former Foje guitarist Romas Rainys and even then-unknown vocalist Povilas Meškėla joined the band. December 1986 was the official start of Katedra.

=== Mors Ultima Ratio and break up ===
In 1989 band finished recording their first LP called "Mors Ultima Ratio" (Latin: "Death is the final accounting"). Although, it was released a year after recording, Katedra's first vinyl album gained extreme popularity in Lithuania. "Mors Ultima Ratio" was also noticed by Edgar Klusener from "Metal Hammer" magazine. He described Katedra as: "that is pure thrash metal act, strong both musically and technically. In fact the formation is superior in comparison with 90 percent of similar Western acts. So it is evident how far the music in Lithuania made headway. Katedra are the only matadors in Lithuania and maybe stand among the hottest European thrash metal bands". Gained popularity, opened doors to concerts abroad. In 1991 Katedra played at "Baltic Sea Music Festival" in Sweden. Unfortunately, it was the last gig for Povilas Meškėla and Romas Rainys with the band. Soon after the festival they left Katedra.

=== Downturn ===
The band was now seeking another shift: Ričardas took over the vocalist position. The band's output at this time included the album "Natus in articulo mortis"; their music became more severe; and Ričardas's vocal entry of the Katedra sounds from the standard clichés. The trio played many concerts and their albums were played on Lithuanian radio stations.

Later, and for some time, concert activity was stopped. Although the trio continued to build and perform together, the group's name was almost forgotten. It was a new generation, and new names appeared on the Metal stage. In February 2001, the band was invited to play an acoustic concert on Lithuanian national television. The group relied on its own feet—and played live.

=== Revival and disbandment ===
From 2003 the band helped keyboardist Naglis Patamsis. The musicians tried to experiment more. In the autumn of 2003, longtime band member Marius Giedrys left Katedra. He was replaced by a new drummer, Domas Dėdinas (who has played in bands such as Inquest, Undertaker, Dahmer, Mezopsychya and Herosgamos).

After a successful appearance at Lithuania's largest rock festival "The nights of rock 2004" in Plateliai, managers found Katedra and booked the band for a few concert programs, which have been shown with success in Lithuanian club music scenes, and also in several foreign festivals.

In the 2005 summer festival "The nights of rock 2005", Katedra presented a retrospective of its old and new songs with the string duo Gleb Pyšniak (cello) and Kristina Baltrušaitytė (viola).

In August 2004, the band announced its third album (and first album on CD format) "III". It was presented in 2006 "The nights of rock".

2006 Band bassist Algis Radavičius was replaced by Gediminas Jurgaitis (previously, he had played in the band "Hersh tu"?

At the end of 2007, Domas Dėdinas was replaced by Salvijus Žeimys (ex "Ossuary", "Spellbound", "Green Bridge Band" and others), who also performs with bands "Skylė", "Atalyja" and "ExLibris".

In September 2008, the group signed a contract with Atra Musica for a fourth album, "Ugnikalnis" (Lithuanian: Volcano)

On November 1, 2008, the band's fourth album, "Ugnikalnis", saw the light of day.

In the end of 2010 Gediminas Jurgaitis left the band. Bass players place was taken by Rimantas Budriūnas.

On June 23, 2019, the band played their final performance at the Kilkim Žaibu festival and disbanded following the concert.

== Significant events ==
- Lituanica ’88 ir ‘89“ (Vilnius)
- „Rock Panorama“ (Moscow)
- „Rock Summer“ ir „Rock Winter“ (Estonia)
- „Liepajas Dzintars ’88 ir ‘89“ (Latvia)
- „Sopot“ (Poland)
- „Ilosaari Pop“ (Finland)
- „Baltic Sea Music Fest '91“ (Sweden)
- Lietuvos kultūros dienos Leipcige '94 (Germany) (Lithuanian cultural days in Leipzig)
- „Death Comes...2000 ir 2001“ (Vilnius)
- „Ferrum Frost“ 2003 ir 2004 (Vilnius)
- „Roko naktys 2003,'04, '05, '06, '07, '08“ (Lithuania)
- „Riga Bike Show 2005“ (Latvia)
- Russia biker show „Baltijskij Šturm 2005“ (Kaliningrad).

== Discography ==
1. Mors Ultima Ratio (1989)
2. Natus In Articulo Mortis (1992)
3. III (2006)
4. Ugnikalnis (Volcano) (2008)
