= Airija =

Lithuanian folk rock band

- Origin: Alytus, Lithuania
- Genres: Folk rock, Rock, Alternative, Acoustic
- Years active: 1992–2000, 2002
- Past members: Darius Mileris Nojus; Koka; Eima; Asta Milerienė

Airija is a folk-rock band formed in Alytus, Lithuania in September 1992. Irish art and culture have had a great influence on the creation of this group. Name of the group Airija means Ireland in the Lithuanian language.

== Biography ==
In 1994 Airija released first album "Yra" (There is), that reached the top 10 of Lithuanian rock. 1995-1996 Airija recorded three more albums: "Čia" (Here), "Yra čia" a live unplugged recording, and "Pasaka" which has kept the band on the top for the five years.

In 1996 the group participated in a joint project with Kaunas Little Theater, called "Photos from the Old Album". The project created a unique mix of acoustic music and theatrical pantomime, which was recognized as the best musical project of the year in Lithuania.

In year 2000 the band suspended activity and members pursued other musical projects. Group was briefly revived in 2002 to celebrate 10th anniversary of the band.

Band Airija reunions: Festival Be2gether 2009, 18th anniversary concert in Vilnius club Bermudai 2010, Festival Roko Maršas 30th anniversary in 2015, band's 1st album "Yra" reissue on vinyl in November 2023, 3nd album "Pasaka" reissue on vinyl in November 2024.

== Members ==
- Darius Mileris Nojus - vocals, guitars, music, lyrics;
- Koka - bass guitar;
- Eima - violin, reed-pipe, clarinet, backing vocals, music;
- Asta Milerienė - drums, tambourine.

== Discography ==
- Yra (Is) (1994)
- Čia (Here) (1995)
- Yra čia (Is here) (1996)
- Pasaka (Fairytale) (1996)
- Naujas (New) (1998)

== Awards ==
- Bravo music awards Discovery of the Year winner, 1993.
- The Rock Group of the Year in Lithuania, 1995
- Third place in France MCM for the Best Small Budget Music Video ( song Į save per save).
- Alytus City Cultural Award, 1997
