= Povilas Meškėla =

- Born: Povilas Meškėla; June 29, 1964 (age 62); Vilnius, Lithuania
- Genres: rock, hard rock, heavy metal
- Occupation: Musician
- Instrument: vocals
- Years active: 1986–present
- Labels: Tigris, Eurostar

Povilas Meškėla (born June 29, 1964 in Vilnius, Lithuania) is a Lithuanian rock musician and a leading singer of a rock band Rojaus tūzai and formerly Katedra.

He started his career in 1986 and was a co-founder of a band Rojaus tūzai in 1990.

Povilas was chosen a national AIDS ambassador of Lithuania in 1999.

== Discography ==
=== With a band Katedra ===
- Mors Ultima Ratio (1989, LP)

=== With a band Rojaus tūzai ===
- Vodk'N'Roll (1993, LP)
- Tikras Garsas (1996)
- Drugys (1997)
- Russkij albom (2002)
- Nepasiduok (2012)
