= Antis (band) =

Lithuanian band

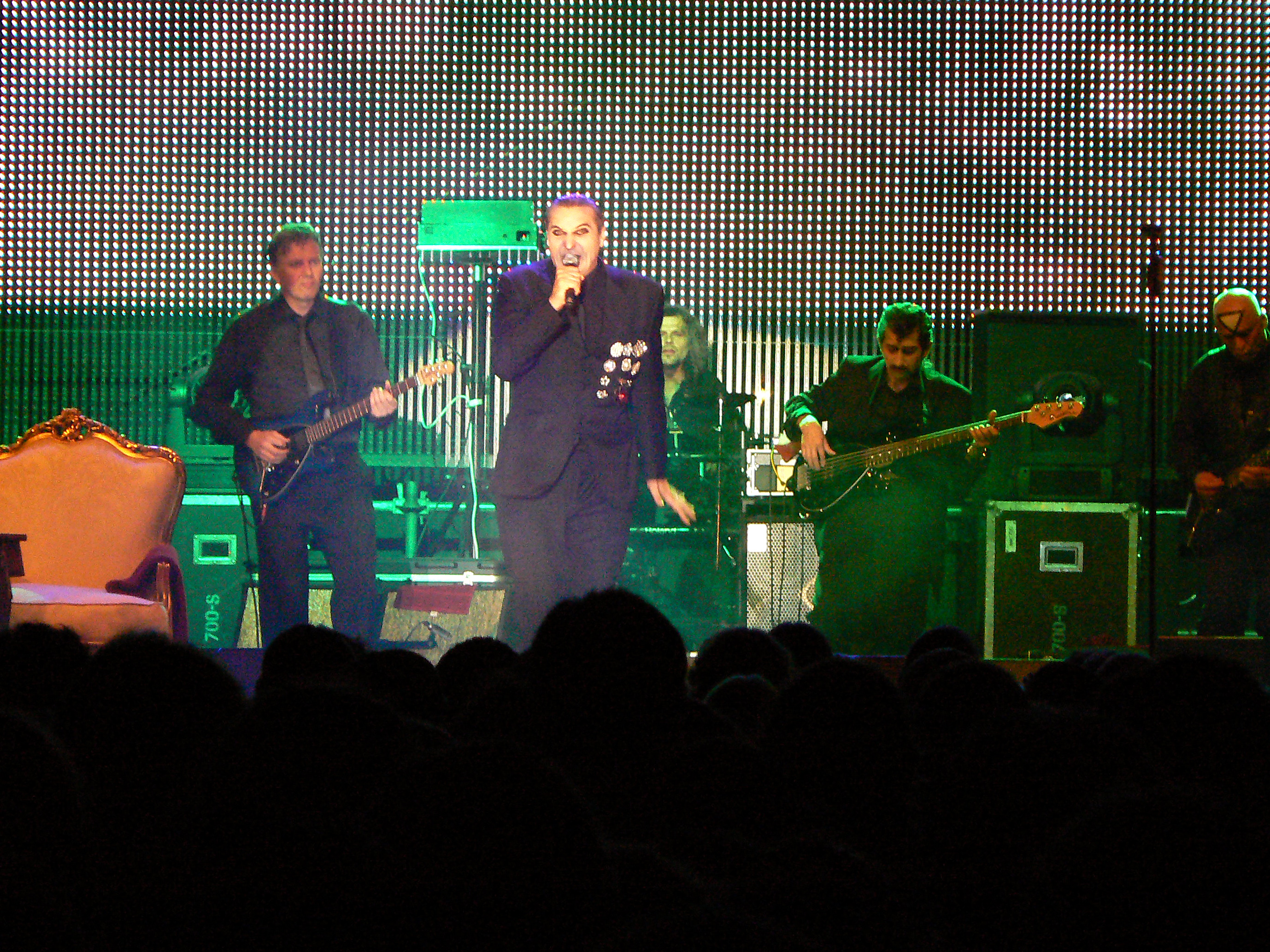

Background information
- Origin: Lithuania
- Genres: New wave, post-punk, art rock, shock rock, ska
- Years active: 1984–1990; 1996, 2003, 2005; 2007–2016
- Labels: Melodya; CCS; Zona records MP3 Shownet
- Past members: Algirdas Kaušpėdas; Petras Ubartas; Vaclovas Augustinas; Linas Buda
- Website: www.antis.lt

Antis is a Lithuanian postmodernist rock band.

== Name ==
Literally, "antis" means "duck" in Lithuanian, but is also a colloquial term, a short for "newspaper duck", which in several European languages means a false newspaper report, a canard. Algirdas Kaušpėdas has stated in an interview that the latter was the intended meaning. Additionally, being a play on the name of the official Soviet-era newspaper "Tiesa" ("Truth", a calque of the official Soviet communist newspaper Pravda), the name alluded to the biased reporting and truth-bending in Eastern Bloc media. The cover of the band's 1987 album displays the name "Antis" assembled from cut-out letters of Tiesa's logo, with a matching N added. According to Kaušpėdas, contrary to popular belief, "Antis" was not originally intended to read as "Anti-S" in order to stand for "Anti-Soviet" . However, upon first hearing the name being interpreted in this way, he found it appropriate and did not object.

== History ==
=== Establishment ===
In 1986, in the last days of the Soviet Union, there was an alternative music explosion in Lithuania. Before then, all "western low-quality music" was officially forbidden, with lists of proscribed bands including Ramones, AC/DC and Alice Cooper.

Algirdas "Pablo" Kaušpėdas founded Antis in 1984 as a joke to entertain attendees at a New Year party that he organised for the architects' union in Kaunas. The band's performance was such a success that word of it spread all over Lithuania. Antis was a politically motivated band that played proscribed music in several styles, including ska. They also wrote their own songs with jaunty horns and witty ironic lyrics. In January 1986, a horn section from Vilnius joined the band and Petras "Sniegius" Ubartas (another architect who was a composer, trumpeter and guitarist) took over the musical leadership of the band so that Pablo could concentrate on lyrics and promotion. Antis was invited to play at the semi-underground festival at Vilnius University and at similar events.

=== Gaining popularity ===
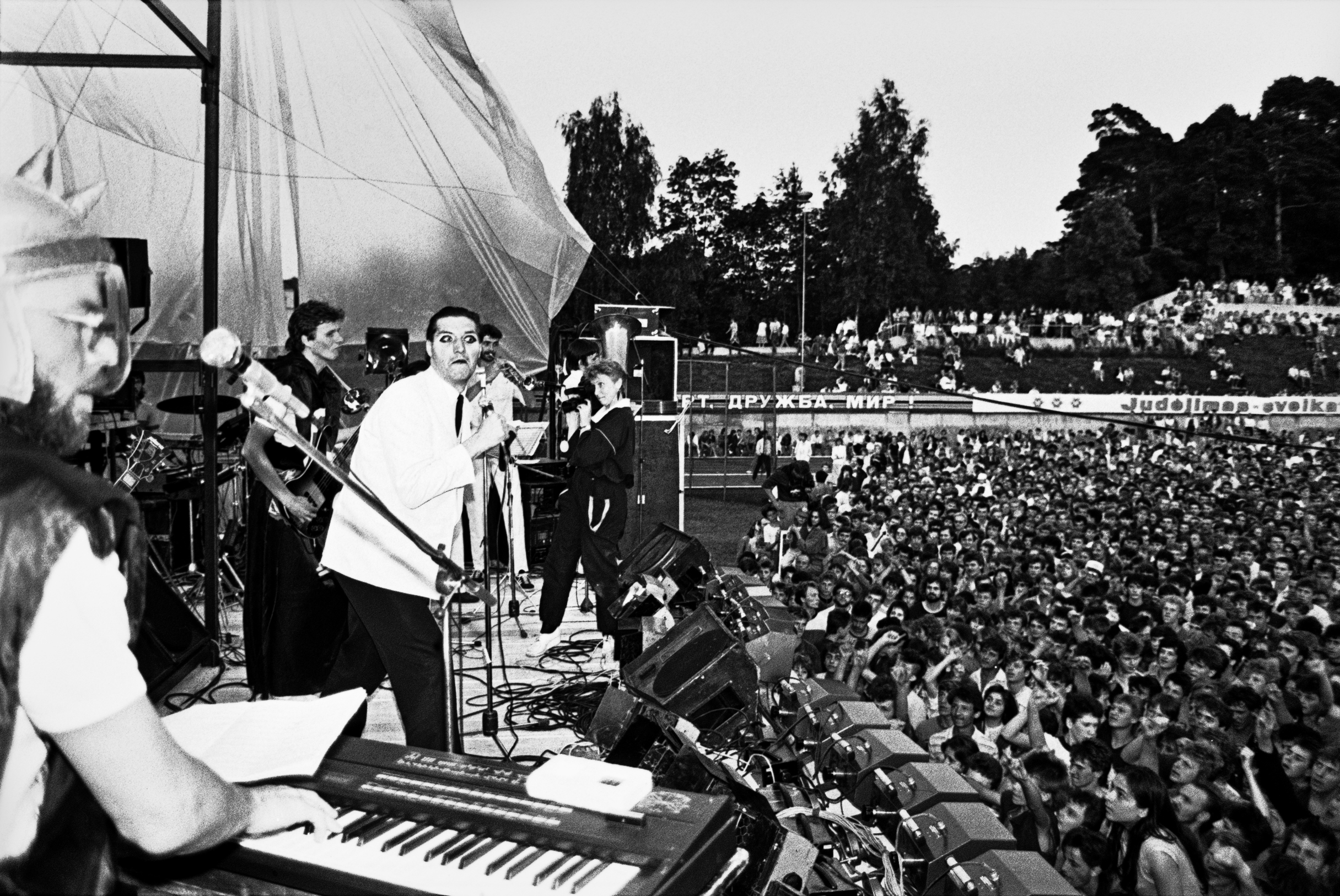
Rock band Antis during an Anti-Sovietism, Anti-communism concert in Vilnius, Lithuania, 1987

At the Lituanica ’86 festival Antis's performance overshadowed those of the headline Russian rock stars Aquarium and Bravo. The subsequent publicity turned Antis into a national sensation and they became known as one of the best rock bands in the whole of the former Soviet Union. Antis grew to such popularity that their audiences numbered hundreds of thousands. They toured most of Europe and the United States.

Algirdas Kaušpėdas designed a dramatic live show with painted faces, besuited musicians, motorbikes, and spaceship models on stage. The band made three video clips, which were later used in the 1986 musical film Kažkas Atsitiko (Something Happened). Kaušpėdas' lyrics were sharply critical of the Soviet regime; an appealing stance for many people during Perestroika. Personnel changes improved the band's musicianship and their music became more sophisticated. Early Antis was heavily influenced by Talking Heads. One of their biggest hits was a cover version of a Men at Work song. Later Sniegius added sounds derived from the work of Frank Zappa.

At the end of 1986 Antis recorded their eponymous debut album at Melodya's Vilnius studio. The self-titled LP was released in 1987 and became one of the best-sold records in Lithuania. Their second album was recorded in 1988 in the CCS studio in Warsaw. The band planned to release this independently but Melodya objected and the ensuing litigation delayed release by a year. The last recording session took place in a Vilnius studio in 1988. Those songs with some selected numbers from the Warsaw session appeared as Anties Dovanėlė (Antis's Present) in 1989.

=== Disbanding ===
Antis gave their final tours in the second half of 1989 and early 1990 including appearances at festivals in Italy, Austria, Germany, France and USA, where they participated at the NY New Music Seminar and played at the CBGB. In 1990 Algirdas Kaušpėdas quit music for politics and then returned to architecture. The rest of the band continued rehearsing and composing, and auditioned some new vocalists but Pablo proved to have been the heart of the band, so they broke up. Some members left the music business and others joined other projects. Kaušpėdas manages a design company and is still an important figure in Lithuanian music and culture.

=== Aftermath ===
In 1994 Zona/BMK released two Antis microcassettes. The EP Bjaurioji Antis (Ugly Antis) included the earliest amateur recordings from Kaunas, before the arrival of the horns. Retas Paukštis (Rare Bird) contained all the songs that had not been released on the Melodya albums. The final album, Geriausios Dainos, was a "best of" compilation, released on CD and MC formats by Zona/BMK in May 1995.

Algirdas Kaušpėdas formed the Antis Orchestra briefly in 1996 using past members and session musicians to recreate the Antis sound for three open-air concerts as part of the Lithuanian Rock March. Most of the original members also reformed briefly in 2003 to promote the release by Zona of most Antis recordings on four CDs (Kažkas atsitiko, Antis, Ša! and Dovanėlė) and a box-set Visa Antis.

The band was a subject of Giedrė Žickytė's 2011 documentary How We Played the Revolution.

=== Resurrection ===
After 17 years of silence (the last album having been released in 1990), the band released Ančių dainos (Songs of Ducks) on 16 December 2007. Initial album sales beat the expectations and became best-selling album by Antis. The band played their official farewell concert on July 5, 2016 at Trakai Island Castle, followed by another performance the next day at Raudondvaris Castle, ending the story of Antis where it had begun.

== Members ==
- Algirdas Kaušpėdas
- Petras Ubartas
- Vaclovas Augustinas (keyboards, vocal) (born 1959) played in Saules laikrodis before joining Antis. Since 1992 he has been chief conductor and artistic director of the Vilnius Municipality Choir Jauna muzika.
- Linas Buda (Drummer) (born 1962 in Kaunas) played in Roko laboratorija before joining Antis. In 1988 he joined the jazz quartet Sasnauskas.
- Gintautas Rakauskas (bass, guitar) (born 1958 in Kaunas) founder of Saules laikrodis played in Roko laboratorija before joining Antis.
- Chupem Antis

== Discography ==
- Antis (1987; LP ''Melodija''; remastered CD 2003 ''Zona''. The first official album which reached a huge success.Re-released in 2003)
- Anties Dovanėlė (1989; LP ''Melodija''; remastered CD 2003 ''Zona'')
- Geriausios Dainos (1995; CD, MC ''Zona''; remastered CD 2006 ''Zona''. The compilation of the best and never released before songs. The first Antis album in CD format )
- Ša! (2003; CD ''Zona''. This was an album which contained the remastered records from 1988–89 years)
- Kažkas Atsitiko (2003; CD ''Zona''.The earliest band records from the approx. period of 1985-86 released in remastered sound)
- Visa Antis (2003; 4CD Box-set.''Zona''. The compilation that includes all the previously recorded material re-released in remastered sound)
- Antis Gyva (2005; DVD ''Zona''. The first Antis DVD; it contains the full show recorded in 2003)
- Ančių Dainos (2007; CD ''MP3 Shownet''. The first new studio album after Antis disbanded in 1990)
- Rugpjūčio 33 (2009; DVD ''MP3''. Live concert, recorded in 2008)
- Zuikis Pleibojus (2009; CD ''MP3''.The second album from the new Antis musical period. It contains the songs from the so-called musical utopia under the same title)
- Baisiai džiugu (2013; CD ''MP3''. The latest and probably the last studio album. The singles from this album reached a great success)
- 2XDuck! (2013; CD+DVD ''MP3''. The live album recorded in 2013. Contains the full show that represented a new album ''Baisiai Džiugu'' released in the same years)
- Zombiai, Atrieda atidunda! (2015; CD+DVD ''MP3''. The live album dedicated to the band's 30 years anniversary tour. Technically the best Lithuanian music DVD)
- Geriausios Dainos 2 (2016; CD+DVD ''MP3''. The compilation of the best songs from the second active band's period which lasted from 2007 to 2016. Also contains the video from the last concert, recorded in July, 2016)

== See also ==
- Lithuanian rock
- Music of Lithuania
