= Bix (rock group) =

Rock band from Lithuania

BIX
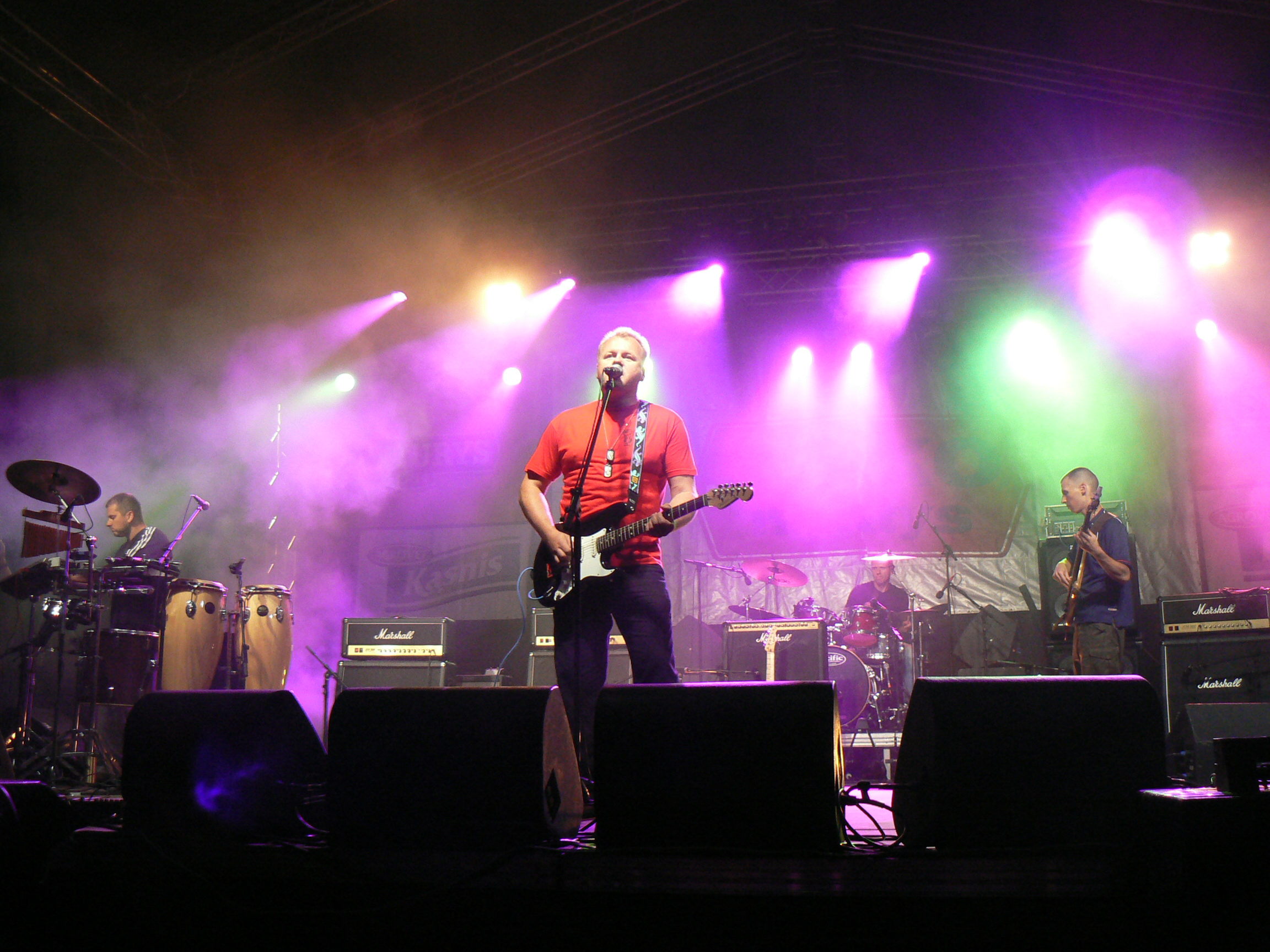

Background information
- Origin: Šiauliai, Lithuania
- Genres: Post-punk, 2 Tone
- Years active: 1987–present
- Label: Zona
- Past members: Saulius 'Samas' Urbonavičius; Gintautas 'Profesorius' Gascevičius; Mindaugas 'Špokas' Špokauskas; Skirmantas Gibavičius; Aurimas Povilaitis

BIX is a rock band from Lithuania. The band was formed in 1987 in Šiauliai and in a few months became a cult band. After a period of intensive touring throughout Europe and the US they were the most experienced Baltic band, and probably the best known in the West. Recording never was a strong side of BIX since they were a 'live' band.

Their style of music may be described as post-punk with the elements of ska, Latin American music and funk.

== Members ==
- Saulius 'Samas' Urbonavičius - Vocals, guitar
- Gintautas 'Profesorius' Gascevičius - drums
- Mindaugas 'Špokas' Špokauskas - keyboards
- Skirmantas Gibavičius - bass
- Aurimas Povilaitis - percussion
- Gleb Vascenko - Tenor saxophone (now retired from group) (1993–1997)

== Discography ==
- 1991 Akli Kariai (LP)
- 1992 La Bomba (LP)
- 1993 Doozgle (CD, MC)
- 1994 Tikras Garsas (MC)
- 1995 7 (CD, MC)
- 1996 Žiurkių Miestas (MC; originally recorded in 1982)
- 1997 WOR'S (CD, MC)
- 2008 XX. I dalis (CD)
- 2015 BIX-Ray (CD)
- 2017 XXX (7 CDs remastered compilation of the previously released albums in different formats; Reissued albums: 1982 - Žiurkių Miestas/Rats City, 1991 - Akli Kariai, 1992 - La Bomba, 1993 - Doozgle, 1995 - 7, 1997 - Wor's,2015 - Bix-Ray)
- 2021 BIX-Berlin'89 (CD, LP) (The very first live album of the band recorded in 1989 in Berlin and discovered unexpectedly after almost 30 years)
