= Algirdas Kaušpėdas =

Lithuanian musician

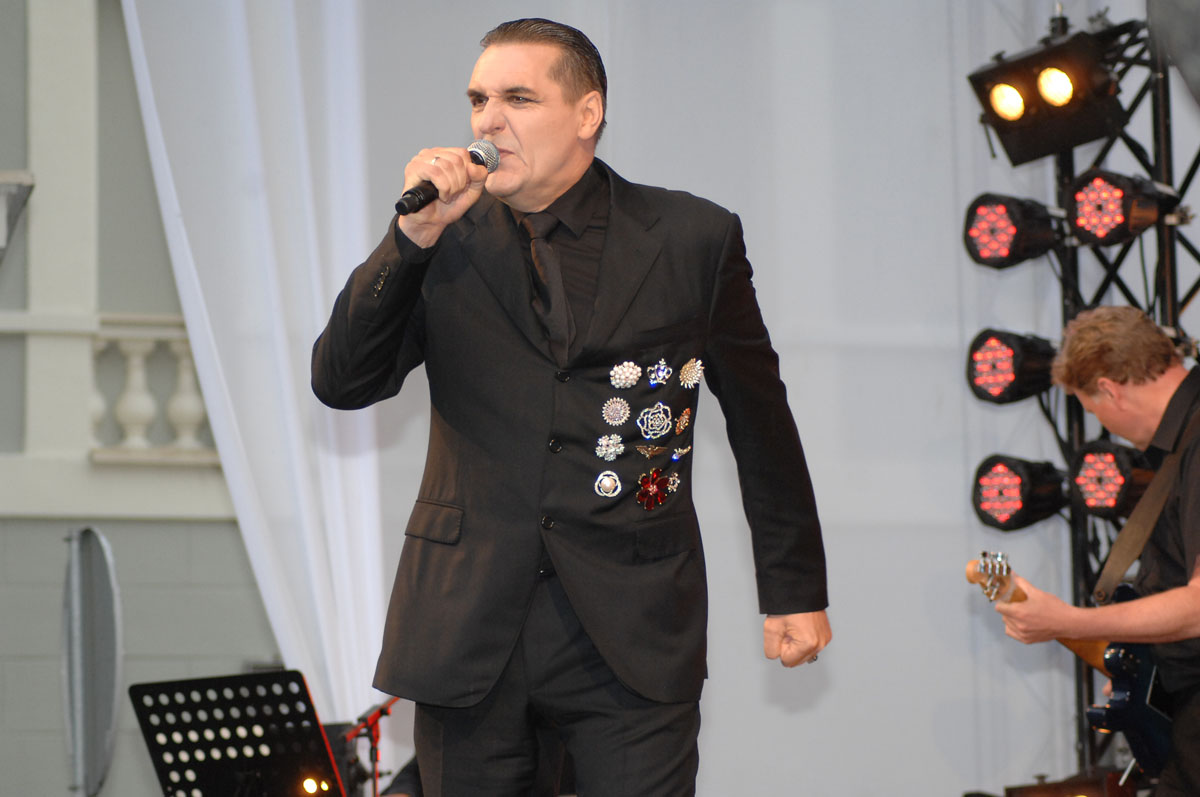

Background information
- Born: Algirdas Kaušpėdas; August 12, 1953 (age 72); Vilnius, Lithuania
- Genres: Rock
- Occupation: Singer
- Website: www.antis.lt

Algirdas Kaušpėdas (born 12 August 1953, in Vilnius, Lithuania) is a Lithuanian rock musician, the leader of Lithuanian rock group Antis, an architect, and one of the Sąjūdis initiators. His wife Vilija Ulozaitė is also an architect.

== Biography ==
Kaušpėdas's father, Vytautas Kaušpėdas, was also an architect. From 1960–1971, Algirdas Kaušpėdas studied at Vilnius 23rd secondary school, in 1968–1971 he studied at Vilnius children art school. In 1976, he graduated from Faculty of Architecture of Vilnius Civil Engineering Institute. In 1976–1984, Kaušpėdas worked as an architect at the Institute of City Construction Planning in Kaunas. In 1984–1990, was the secretary of Kaunas Architects' Union. In 1990–1992, was a director of Lithuanian national television. In marriage with Audra Kauspediene had two daughters.

From 1993, he is a director in the architecture company Jungtinės pajėgos. Kaušpėdas constructed dwelling houses in Lithuania, Germany, Denmark, Norway. He released catalogues of multiple dwelling houses and established the company of real estate projects development JP Haus.

In 1988–1990, he was an active member of Sąjūdis, a member of its initiative group and council. Kaušpėdas also participated in the presidential election campaign of Rolandas Paksas. In the 2004 elections, he supported Petras Auštrevičius.

== Music career ==
He was a co-founder of several rock groups with Antis being the most known. Kaušpėdas is the author of most of Antis's lyrics and some of its music. The band released four albums: Antis (1987), Anties dovanėlė (1989), Ančių dainos (2007), and Zuikis Pleibojus (2009). The group created film Kažkas atsitiko (1986) and Gyva antis (2005). Algirdas Kaušpėdas performed with Antis in Lithuania, Russia, Germany, France, United States and other countries.
