= Foje =

Lithuanian rock band

FOJE
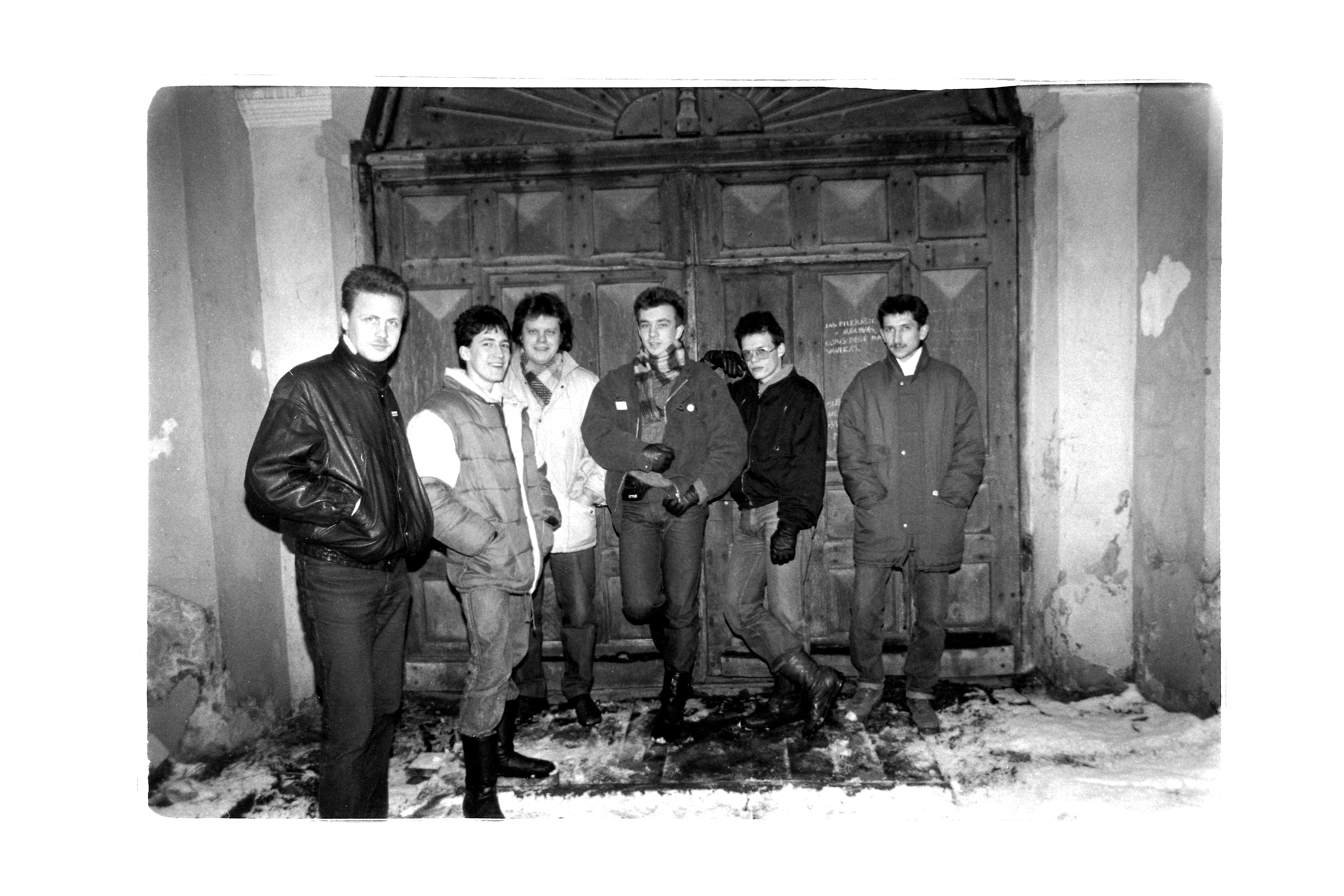
- Group picture of the Lithuanian rock band Foje, among the protagonists of the third edition of the Roko maršas (March). Vilnius, 1987.

Background information
- Also known as: Sunki Muzika (1983-1984)
- Origin: Vilnius, Lithuania
- Genres: Alternative rock, new wave, post-punk
- Years active: 1983–1997, 2013
- Labels: CCS Intermedia; Vilniaus plokštelių įrašų studija; Bomba
- Past members: Andrius Mamontovas; Arnoldas Lukošius; Algis Kriščiūnas; Darius Burokas; Darius Tarasevičius; Romas Rainys; Eugenijus Pugačiukas; Saulius Valikonis; Gediminas Simniškis; Jaunius Beinortas; Robertas Meržvinskas; Robertas Griškevičius
- Website: www.foje.lt

Foje was one of the most successful and best known rock bands in Lithuania.

== History ==
Foje was formed in the present-day Antakalnis Secondary School in Vilnius by Andrius Mamontovas, Arnoldas Lukošius and Darius Tarasevičius in 1983 under the name of Sunki Muzika ("Hard Music"); a few months later Algis Kriščiūnas joined the band. In 1984 it was renamed to Foje (literal meaning: "foyer"). Through its years, the band survived a number of lineup changes, and released over ten albums.

The group cited several influences, including the sound of the Stranglers, as well as the 1980s post-punk movement (for example the notable nod to Depeche Mode on Foje's 1989 electronica album Žodžiai į Tylą). These influences were combined with the often gloomy, desperate lyrics of the band's leader Andrius Mamontovas.

In 1997 the band performed three farewell gigs in the Lithuanian cities of Klaipėda, Kaunas and Vilnius, with attendance of 60,000 in the final performance on 17 May in Vingis Park of Vilnius. After disbanding Mamontovas started a solo career.

Two of the band's songs - "Laužo šviesa" ("The Light of the Bonfire") (1986) and "Meilės nebus per daug" ("There will not be too much love") (1994) - were voted by the media professionals into the Top 20 best Lithuanian songs of the 20th century in 2000.

== Members ==
- Andrius Mamontovas (1983–1997) - Vocals, guitar, drums, keyboards
- Arnoldas Lukošius (1983–1989, 1992–1997) - Keyboards, accordion
- Algis Kriščiūnas (1983–1985, 1992–1997) - Drums
- Darius Burokas (1986–1988, 1990–1997) - Bass, keyboards
- Darius Tarasevičius (1983–1985) - Bass
- Romas Rainys (1985–1988) Bass, Guitar
- Eugenijus Pugačiukas (1985–1991) - Drums
- Saulius Valikonis (1986–1988, 1989–1991) - Saxophone
- Gediminas Simniškis (1988–1989) - Bass
- Jaunius Beinortas (1988–1989) - Guitar
- Robertas Meržvinskas (1988–1989) - Saxophone
- Robertas Griškevičius (1989–1990) - Keyboards

== Discography ==
- 1989 - Geltoni krantai (Yellow Shores) (MC)
- 1990 - Žodžiai į tylą (Words Into Silence) (LP, MC (Note: Released in 1995.))
- 1991 - Gali skambėti keistai (It Might Sound Strange) (LP, CD, MC)
- 1992 - Kitoks pasaulis (A Different World) (LP, CD, (Note: Released in 1993.) MC) - first CD album in Lithuanian music history.
- 1993 - Vandenyje (In The Water) (LP, CD, MC)
- 1994 - Tikras garsas (The Real Sound) (MC)
- 1994 - M-1 (dancemixes) (CD, MC)
- 1994 - Aš čia esu (I Am Here) (MC)
- 1994 - Aš čia esu (LP Picture Disc)
- 1995 - Kai perplauksi upę (When You Swim Across The River) (CD, MC)
- 1995 - Live On The Air (MC)
- 1996 - 1982 (MC, CD)
- 1997 - The Flowing River EP (CD)
- 1997 - Mokykla (School) (MC)
- 1999 - Vilnius - Kaunas - Klaipėda (CD, MC)
- 2002 - Paveikslas (The Picture) (CD, MC)
- 2006 - Kita paveikslo pusė (The Other Side of the Picture) (CD)
- 2013 - AM+FOJE=30 (AM - Andrius Mamontovas) (CD)
