= Žalgiris Arena =

Arena in Kaunas, Lithuania

Žalgirio Arena

- Interactive map of Žalgirio Arena
- Address: Karaliaus Mindaugo pr. 50
- Location: Kaunas, Lithuania
- Coordinates: 54°53′25″N 23°54′52″E
- Owner: Kaunas City Municipality
- Capacity: Variable: Basketball: 15,415; Concerts: 20,000; Ice hockey: 13,762; Futsal: 13,807; Circus: 15,400; Boxing: 15,261; Volleyball: 13,666; Handball: 13,807
- Record attendance: 20,517 (December 5, 2015)

Construction
- Groundbreaking: 26 September 2008
- Opened: 18 August 2011
- Expanded: 2022 (swimming venue)
- Cost: €50 million
- Architect: Eugenijus Miliūnas
- Main contractor: Vėtrūna

Tenants
- Žalgiris Kaunas (LKL, Euroleague) (2011–present)

Website
- zalgirioarena.lt

Žalgirio Arena is a multi-purpose indoor arena in the New Town of Kaunas, Lithuania. The arena is located on an island of the Nemunas River and is the largest indoor arena in the Baltics. The arena's maximum possible seating capacity for basketball games is 15,415, and 20,000 spectators for concerts (when the stage is in the middle, and 17,000 when stage is in the side of the arena). The Žalgiris Arena replaced the Kaunas Sports Hall as a major venue in the city.

The Žalgiris Arena hosts basketball and other sports matches, concerts, fairs, exhibitions, and various other events. The arena's namesake basketball club BC Žalgiris, which currently competes in the domestic LKL and the EuroLeague, uses the facility for all of its European and LKL home fixtures. BC Žalgiris and Žalgiris Arena has had the highest average attendance in the Euroleague in 2011–12, 2012–13, 2017–18, 2018–19, 2019–20, 2020–21.

Žalgirio Arena belongs to Žalgiris Group, which operates the largest Darius and Girėnas Stadium in the Baltic States and the Kaunas Sports Hall.

Next to the Žalgirio Arena, on Nemunas Island, the first science and innovation center in Lithuania, Mokslo sala (Science Island), is located.

== History ==
The arena's construction started in September 2008; the main contractor of the arena is the Lithuanian construction company Vėtrūna, chief architect – Eugenijus Miliūnas. The total cost of the arena is estimated to be 168.8 million litas (50 million euros). .

In March 2010, the Kaunas City Municipality named the arena Žalgiris Arena.

The arena was opened on 18 August 2011 with a basketball match between Lithuania and Spain

In 2015, 2016 and 2017, Žalgiris Arena was voted the best in the entire league in a survey of EuroLeague general managers.

== Arena information ==
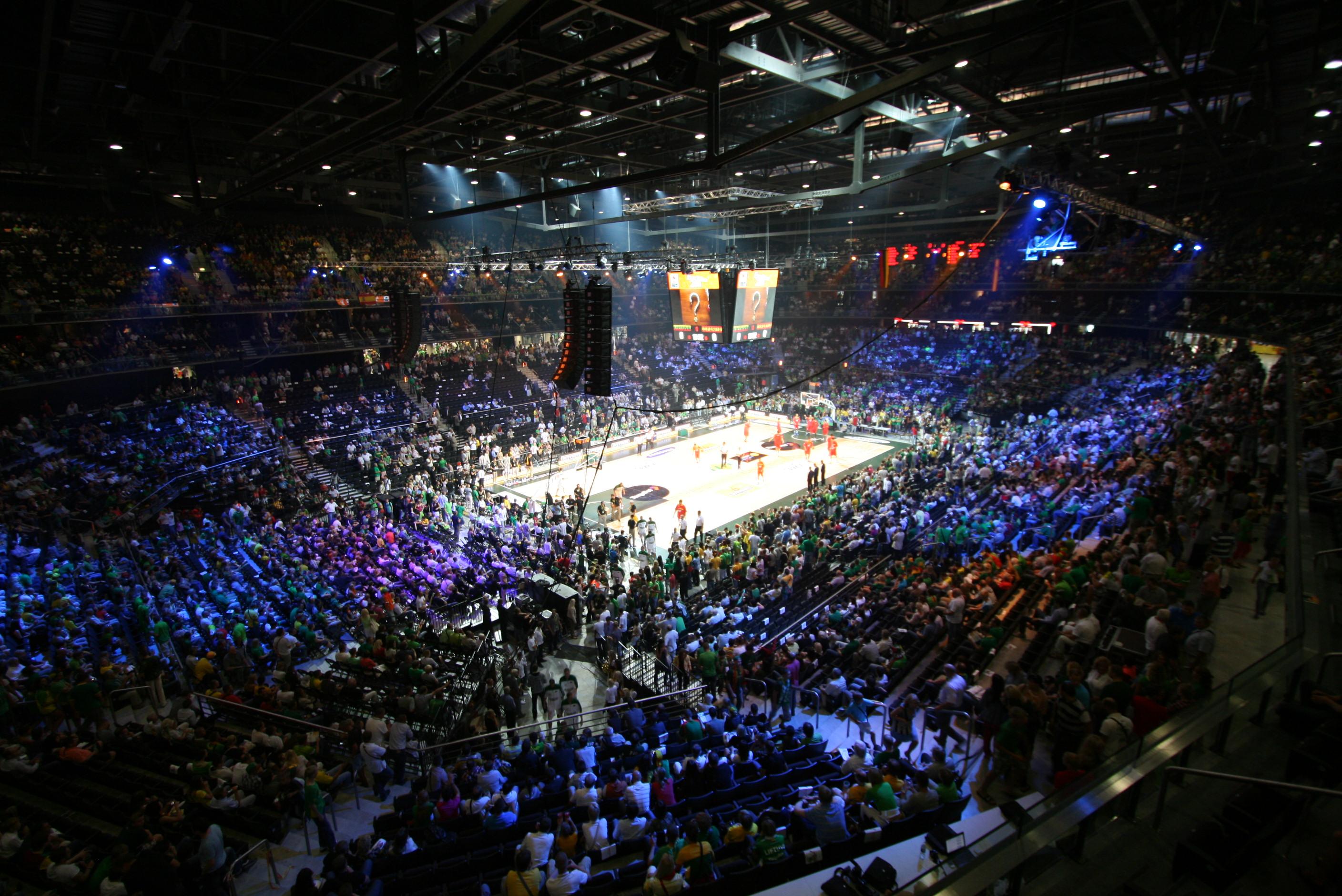
Žalgiris Arena interior in 2011

The Žalgiris Arena is the largest in the Baltic states and covers 39,684 m^{2} (427,160 sq ft). It holds 20,000 spectators for concerts. It is situated in the eastern part of the Nemunas river island and its shape has nine corners. The arena's facade is made of high-end and highly transparent glass. A part of the facade has a unique metal wall, which is already naturally encrusted with rust.

It is equipped with some unique technical solutions, such as power windows and modern ice-making installation. Advanced audio equipment (amplifiers, digital mixing engines and stage boxes) by Yamaha is installed in the Žalgiris Arena.

In April 2016, the facade of the Žalgiris Arena was equipped with the largest LED screen in Lithuania and one of the largest in Europe, which is also used as the name of the arena.

There are 11 spaces in the arena, where more than 300 various events take place annually and the events are attended by more than 950,000 visitors per season.

The arena has 68 VIP boxes and three club seating zones, whose visitors can enjoy exclusive privileges and service.

Žalgiris Arena pays great attention to environmental solutions: in 2015, the arena became the first arena in the world to receive the BREEAM In-Use sustainable building certificate, in 2022, a 500 kilowatt solar power plant was installed on the roof of the arena and in 2023, an apiary was established on Nemunas Island near the Zalgiris Swimming Pool Complex. In 2024, the arena lighting was replaced with modern and energy-efficient LED lighting and to promote sustainability, disposable cups were eliminated in the arena.

In September 2024, the video cube in the arena was renovated, becoming not only larger, but also twice as high in resolution.

The complex has been expanded with a 50-meter Olympic pool with 10 lanes and seating for 500 spectators was installed in the arena and opened its doors in September 2022. Adjacent is an additional 25-meter pool with two 90-cm-deep lanes for teaching children to swim. The pool, equipment and facilities are adapted to meet the requirements of the International Swimming Federation (FINA) allowing it to host international level competitions.

== Home team ==
BC Zalgiris is the most titled Lithuanian basketball team, whose home has been the Zalgirio Arena since its opening.

== Major concerts ==
Since the arena's opening, the biggest Lithuanian and world-class music stars have held their concerts at the Žalgiris Arena, such as: James Blunt, Hurts, Jean Michel Jarre, Mireille Mathieu, The Orchestra, Lenny Kravitz, Gytis Paškevičius, Toto Cutugno, Suzi Quatro, Chris Norman, Bonnie Tyler, Rammstein, Zucchero, Lizz Wright, The Prodigy, Marilyn Manson, Red Hot Chili Peppers, Sting, Virgilijus Noreika, RONDO, Katie Melua, Smokie, Thomas Anders, Joel Edwards, Gregorian, Stasys Povilaitis, Sel, Eric Clapton, Jazzu, Andrius Mamontovas, Foje, Elton John, Robertino Loreti, Marijonas Mikutavicius, Naktines personos, Sarah Brightman, Apocalyptica, Cassandra Wilson, Tom Jones, Brit Floyd, Lara Fabian, Vaidas Baumila, Riccardo Fogli, Donatas Montvydas, Kylie Minogue, Dzordana Butkute, Leon Somov & Jazzu, Roxette, Enrique Iglesias, Saulius Prusaitis, Antis, Robbie Williams, Edgaras Lubys, Rosita Civilyte, Vilhelmas Cepinskis, Scorpions, Boney M., Lilas ir Innomine, Mariah Carey, Take 6, Mika, Muse, Iron Maiden, Merunas Vitulskis, Ace of Base, Dr. Alban, Haddaway, Snap!, La Bouche, Inga Valinskiene, C. C. Catch, Fancy, Martynas Levickis, Blue, Scooter, 2 Unlimited, Sash!, Kastytis Kerbedis, Ovidijus Vysniauskas, Dianne Reeves, Patricia Kaas, Nelly Furtado, Romas Dambrauskas, Andrea Bocelli, DJ BoBo, Queen + Adam Lambert, Vytautas Siskauskas, Alphaville, Silent Circle, Kraftwerk, G&G Sindikatas, Edmundas Kucinskas, Laura Mvula, Bryan Adams, Roger Waters, Radži, Albano, Linas Adomaitis, Mantas Jankavicius, Placido Domingo, Inga Jankauskaite, ATB, Eiffel 65, Sonique, Coco Star, Bobby McFerrin, Il Volo, Salvador Sobral, Eros Ramazotti, Asmik Grigorian, Chris de Burgh, Dieter Bohlen, Ten Walls, Alina Orlova, Vidas Bareikis, Beissoul & Einius, 8 Kambarys, Justinas Jarutis, Jessica Shy, Renée Fleming, Dirty Loops, Khalid, OneRepublic, Whitesnake, Dua Lipa, LP, Royal Philharmonic, Il Divo, OG Version, Elderbrook, Daddy Was A Milkman, Natalija Bunke, Gabriele Vilkickyte, Saules kliosas, Nazareth, Sisters On Wire, Kurt Elling, Louis Tomlinson, 50 Cent, Gabrielius Vagelis, Army of Lovers, Bad Boys Blue, Till Lindemann, Imany, Loreen, Antikvariniai Kaspirovskio dantys, Gregory Porter, GJan, Ba., Mokinukes, Dinamika, Hiperbolė, Monika Liu, 69 Danguje, Snarky Puppy, J Balvin, La Bouche, Thirty Seconds to Mars, The Italian Tenors, Cascada, Vengaboys, Basshunter, 2 Unlimited, Jason Donovan, Lian Ross, Mr. President, Jonas Nainys, Alfredo Rodríguez, Groove Coverage, Alice Deejay, Sylver, Karaliska erdve, Vienna Mozart Orchestra, Žemaitukai, Zilvinas Zvagulis, Ieva Dudaite, Delfinai, Rod Stewart, Martin Garrix, Benny Benassi, Dynoro, The Offspring, ASAP Rocky, André Rieu, Paulina Paukštaitytė and many others.

== Major sports events ==
Since 2011, Žalgiris Arena has hosted competitions in basketball, indoor soccer, handball, judo, dance sports, ice hockey, figure skating, boxing and other sports.

Zalgirio Arena held the playoffs and finals of the 37th European Basketball Championship (EuroBasket 2011), which took place in September 2011.

In 2012, the Žalgiris Arena hosted the FIBA Under-17 Basketball World Cup.

Motocross World Championship event Night of the Jumps also took place in Žalgiris Arena in March 2013. This event was part of Night of the Jumps world tour.

The King Mindaugas Cup Final Four was held at the Žalgiris Arena in 2017 and 2024. The home team became champions both times.

The arena hosted The 2018 IIHF World Championship Division I matches.

In 2020, the arena hosted one of FIBA World Olympic Qualifying Tournament. In its final, Lithuania lost to Slovenia, which won an Olympic berth.

The arena hosted the 2021 FIFA Futsal World Cup group, play-offs and final matches.

On 19 December 2022, Kaunas was announced as a host city for the 2023 EuroLeague Final Four, the first in Lithuania's sports history. The Final Four was held on 19–21 May 2023 in the Žalgiris Arena and the Real Madrid Baloncesto won the Championship Game versus the Olympiacos B.C. 79–78.

On 10–14 January 2024, Žalgirio arena hosted ISU European Figure Skating Championships 2024.

The arena hosted World Modern Pentathlon Championships in August 2025. The swimming competition took place in a nearby pool.

On September 27, 2025, at the Žalgirio Arena, Lithuanian boxer, European champion, Olympian, World Boxing Association welterweight world champion Eimantas Stanionis held his first professional fight in Lithuania during the UTMA 13 X STANIONIS PROMOTIONS tournament. His opponent was South African Jabulani Makhense. In front of 12,000 spectators, the Lithuanian won the fight by decision with a score of 99:91, 100:90, 99:91.

Žalgirio arena hosted one group and a quarterfinal of UEFA Futsal Euro 2026.

The attendance record for combat sports events in Lithuania was broken during the UTMA (kickboxing) 19 tournament, with 15,050 people watched the event at the Žalgirio Arena.

== EuroLeague attendance ==
This is a list of EuroLeague games attendance of Žalgiris at Žalgiris Arena.

Pos	Season	Total	High	Low	Average
1	2011–12	105,307	15,000	9,150	13,163
1	2012–13	161,103	15,420	10,190	13,475
7	2013–14	118,433	12,000	8,150	9,869
6	2014–15	117,040	14,382	8,670	10,640
2	2015–16	131,998	14,790	8,702	11,000
2	2016–17	171,266	15,231	8,621	11,418
1	2017–18	230,518	15,525	10,195	13,560
1	2018–19	251,742	15,517	13,569	14,808
1	2019–20	199,088	15,342	9,405	14,221
1	2020–21	10,381	5,131	239	3,460
4	2021–22	106,830	12,686	4,863	7,630
2	2022–23	266,917	15,293	11,024	14,829
4	2023–24	251,136	15,222	12,881	14,773
4	2024–25	252,826	15,325	14,357	14,872
4	2025–26	312,489	15,428	14,430	14,880

== Other events ==
The M.A.M.A. awards have been held annually at Žalgiris Arena since 2012.

In 2018, 2020 and 2025, the arena hosted the final of the Lithuanian national selection for the Eurovision Song Contest.

== Notable facts ==
On October 28, 2012, the VTB United League game between BC Zalgiris and PBC CSKA Moscow set an all-time arena record for a basketball game - 15,812 spectators.

On September 27, 2014, the jersey of BC Žalgiris player Arvydas Sabonis, with the number 11 was unveiled at the Žalgiris Arena. This number is no longer used by the club.

Lithuanian dance music group Sel is the only one to have managed to gather more than 20,000 spectators in the arena. They did this three times - in 2014, 2015 and 2024.

On March 25, 2015, the jersey of BC Žalgiris player Modestas Paulauskas with the number 5 was unveiled at the Žalgiris Arena. This number is no longer used by the club.

In 2016, the arena's video cube was dismantled for a concert by the British rock band Muse. This is the only time in the arena's history that it has been dismantled.

On April 22, 2017, the jersey of BC Žalgiris coach Vladas Garastas was raised at the Žalgiris Arena.

In 2018, during the EuroLeague playoff matches between BC Zalgiris and Olympiacos B.C., the 2018 IIHF World Championship Division I matches was held at Žalgiris Arena, so for this decision, the basketball court and part of the stands were installed on the ice.

On April 23, 2019, the jersey of BC Žalgiris coach Jonas Kazlauskas was raised at the Žalgiris Arena.

Dua Lipa's concert officially sold the most tickets for a concert by a foreign artist in an indoor venue in Lithuania.

British-Albanian-Kosovar singer Dua Lipa revealed that she had to make do with one set of clothes during her performance at the Žalgiris Arena because her stage costumes did not arrive on time.

On October 18, 2022, the jersey of BC Žalgiris player Paulius Jankūnas with the number 13 was unveiled at the Žalgiris Arena. This number is no longer used by the club.

From October 2022 to March 19, 2024, a streak of 30 consecutive sold-out BC Zalgiris games in the EuroLeague was achieved at Žalgirio Arena.

On November 1, 2024, during a EuroLeague game between BC Zalgiris and AS Monaco, one of the spectators in the arena suffered a cardiac arrest. Fortunately, prompt assistance helped revive the man.

Prince Albert II of Monaco visited Kaunas for the World Modern Pentathlon Championships.

On September 29, 2026, legendary NBA player and NordVPN ambassador Shaquille O'Neal watched the EuroLeague game between BC Žalgiris and Olympiacos B.C. at the arena.

== See also ==
- List of indoor arenas in Lithuania
- Darius and Girėnas Stadium
- Kaunas Sports Hall
- BC Žalgiris

Events and tenants
Preceded by Spodek; Katowice	FIBA EuroBasket; Final Venue; 2011	Succeeded by Arena Stožice; Ljubljana
Preceded by Coliseo El Pueblo (Colombia) Cali	FIFA Futsal World Cup; Final Venue; 2021	Succeeded by Humo Arena (Uzbekistan) Tashkent
Preceded by Espoo Metro Areena; Espoo	ISU European Figure Skating Championships; 2024	Succeeded by Tondiraba Ice Hall; Tallinn
