= Paulina Paukštaitytė =

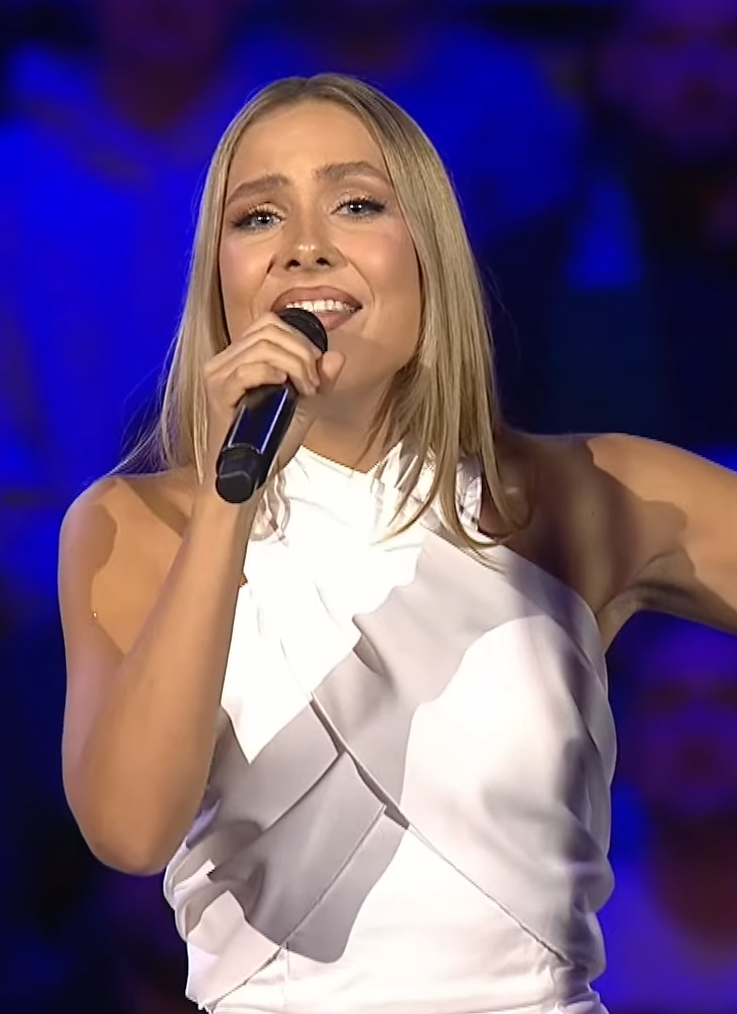
- Paukštaitytė performing in February 2026

Background information
- Born: 22 December 2000 (age 25); Marijampolė, Lithuania
- Occupations: Singer; songwriter; voice actress
- Years active: 2017–present
- Labels: Universal Music Group; Independent
- Website: paulinapaukstaityte.lt

Paulina Paukštaitytė (born 22 December 2000) is a Lithuanian singer, songwriter and voice actress. She rose to prominence after competing on Lietuvos balsas (The Voice of Lithuania) and has since become one of the most popular young-generation artists in Lithuania. Her best-known songs include "Pasilik praeity", "Melagis", "Jei gyvenčiau mėnuly", "Bučiuok" and "Pažįstamas jausmas"; her recordings have been streamed more than 60 million times across YouTube and Spotify, with her official YouTube channel alone accumulating nearly 42 million views. She is also known as a dubbing artist, voicing Asha in the Lithuanian version of Disney's Wish and Glinda in Universal Pictures' Wicked films.

== Early life ==
Paukštaitytė was born and raised in Marijampolė, where she lived until the age of 18. She grew up surrounded by music, performed from an early age and took part in numerous local and international music competitions as a schoolgirl, winning a series of prizes. Among them was the Marijampolė youth singing competition "Žvaigždžių atspindžiai", where she competed in 2012 as its youngest participant; the contest later credited her among the alumni it helped launch to fame, and in 2018 she returned as a jury member.

At 15, she auditioned for the television singing competition Lietuvos balsas (2017), later describing the positive reception there as the moment she decided to pursue music professionally and to begin writing her own material. She reached the final stages of the show.

== Career ==
=== 2020–2022: Early singles and Universal Music signing ===
Paukštaitytė released her debut single "Sapnai" in 2020, followed by "Nepastebimai" and "Jei nebūtume susitikę" (2021), and "Kas šiandien bus" (2022). In 2022 she released the duet "Įsimylėjau" with Vaidas Baumila and signed a recording contract with Universal Music Group. By 2024, her songs had been streamed more than five million times on music platforms.

=== 2023: 11 raidžių ===
In early 2023, Paukštaitytė competed in Pabandom iš naujo!, the Lithuanian national selection for the Eurovision Song Contest, with her own composition "Let Me Think About Me" and reached the final of the selection.

In March 2023, she released the single "Jei gyvenčiau mėnuly", whose music video has accumulated over 2.7 million views on YouTube.

On 20 October 2023, she released her debut studio album 11 raidžių ("11 Letters") through Universal Music Group. The title encodes the eleven-letter Lithuanian phrase "Aš tave myliu" ("I love you"), and the artist described the record as a collection of love songs. In support of the album she embarked on her first concert tour in November 2023, performing at Kultūros fabrikas in Klaipėda, the Žalgiris Arena Amphitheatre in Kaunas, and Kablys in Vilnius.

=== 2024–2025: Ego Kalbà and breakthrough ===
In 2024, following a sold-out acoustic concert at St. Catherine's Church in Vilnius, Paukštaitytė announced further solo piano concerts at the Kurhaus concert hall in Palanga and the Kaunas Cultural Centre. In November 2024 she released "Pasilik praeity", which became one of her signature songs and one of the longest-charting Lithuanian singles of the period.

Her second studio album, Ego Kalbà ("Ego Speaks"), was released independently in January 2025. Created over nearly a year with producers Jānis Jačmenkins (Latvia) and Vilius Popendikis, the album marked a shift toward darker, richer electronic sounds and featured collaborations with Atlanta ("Melagis") and Gabrielius Vagelis ("Sakyk kodėl"). "Melagis" became a radio hit, reaching number two on the ZIP FM airplay chart. The same year, she featured on Justinas Jarutis's single "Aš pakeliui", from his album po manęs tik gyvenimas, which has surpassed one million streams on Spotify.

In December 2025 she released the duet "Pažįstamas jausmas" with Adomas Vyšniauskas, which became one of the longest-charting songs on the Top 20 of the radio station Lietus, still ranking in the top ten more than half a year after its release.

For her 2025 activity, Paukštaitytė received Breakthrough of the Year nominations at both the inaugural M1 Music Awards, held in December 2025 at Žalgiris Arena, and the M.A.M.A. awards, where she also performed at the ceremony in February 2026.

=== 2026: Liepsnoja, Žalgiris Arena concert and television ===
Her third studio album, Liepsnoja ("Ablaze"), was released independently on 2 March 2026.

In January 2026, Paukštaitytė became the captain of the Marijampolė "Rožinis" (Pink) choir in Didysis chorų mūšis, LNK's revival of the Clash of the Choirs television format, in which well-known Lithuanian artists lead choirs representing their home cities.

On 22 February 2026, she performed the Lithuanian national anthem at the final four of the King Mindaugas Cup, Lithuania's national basketball cup, at Šiauliai Arena. Her rendition, joined by the crowd of thousands in the arena, went viral on social media and was widely praised across Lithuania.

On 16 April 2026, Paukštaitytė performed the largest concert of her career at Žalgiris Arena in Kaunas, the biggest indoor arena in the Baltic states, before a crowd of thousands. The show, staged as a single dramaturgical story combining music, choreography and visual effects, featured guest performances by Justinas Jarutis and Gabrielius Vagelis. A concert at Arena Vilnius was announced for 11 December 2026.

== Film dubbing ==
Paukštaitytė has become one of Lithuania's most prominent film dubbing voices. In 2023, she voiced the lead role of Asha in the Lithuanian version of Walt Disney Animation Studios' animated musical Wish (Lithuanian: Noras), released by Disney for the studio's 100th anniversary.

In 2024, she was selected to voice Glinda — played in the original by Ariana Grande — in the Lithuanian dub of Universal Pictures' musical film Wicked (Lithuanian: Piktoji), recorded at the Garso architektūra studio alongside Monika Marija Paulauskaitė (Elphaba) and Vaidas Baumila (Fiyero). She attended the film's European premiere in London in November 2024. She reprised the role in the sequel Wicked: For Good (2025), attending its premiere in Paris, where she met Grande, whom she has cited as a formative influence.

=== Dubbing roles ===
| Year | Title | Lithuanian title | Role | Studio |
|---|---|---|---|---|
| 2023 | Wish | Noras | Asha | Walt Disney Animation Studios |
| 2024 | Wicked | Piktoji | Glinda | Universal Pictures |
| 2025 | Wicked: For Good | Piktoji. Antroji dalis | Glinda | Universal Pictures |

== Artistry ==
Paukštaitytė writes her own songs and has said visual language is as important to her as the musical one. She has cited the absence of a Lithuanian female pop role model during her childhood as a driving motivation in her career.

== Discography ==
=== Studio albums ===
| Title | Details | Weeks on chart — LTU |
|---|---|---|
| 11 raidžių | Released: 20 October 2023; Label: Universal Music Group | 96 |
| Ego Kalbà | Released: 17 January 2025; Label: Independent | 69 |
| Liepsnoja | Released: 2 March 2026; Label: Independent | 11 |

Weeks on the AGATA weekly Top 100 albums chart as documented in the cited chart edition of May 2026; all three albums were still charting at that time, so totals continue to grow.

=== As featured artist ===
| Title | Year | Album |
|---|---|---|
| "Aš pakeliui" (Justinas Jarutis featuring Paulina Paukštaitytė) | 2025 | po manęs tik gyvenimas |

== Awards and nominations ==
| Year | Award | Category | Work | Result |
|---|---|---|---|---|
| 2025 | M1 Music Awards | Breakthrough of the Year (Metų proveržis) | Herself | Nominated |
| 2025 | M.A.M.A. | Breakthrough of the Year (Metų proveržis) | Herself | Nominated |
