= Lietuvos balsas =

- Created by: John de Mol Jr. Roel van Velzen
- Presented by: Vytautas Rumšas Jr.; Inga Jankauskaitė; Rolandas Vilkončius; Jonas Nainys; Rolandas Mackevičius
- Judges: Egidijus Sipavičius; Jurgis Didžiulis & Erica Jennings; Merūnas Vitulskis; Violeta Tarasovienė; Arūnas Valinskas & Inga Valinskienė; Donatas Montvydas; Katažina Nemycko; Aleksandras Ivanauskas-Fara; Renata Norvilė & Deivis Norvilas; Rūta Ščiogolevaitė; Džordana Butkutė; Inga Jankauskaitė; Leonas Somovas; Justinas Jarutis; Monika Liu; Moniqué; Mantas Jankavičius; Benas Aleksandravičius; Gabrielė Vilkickytė; Jessica Shy; Aistè Gaižauskaitė; Ovidijus Petrauskas & Linas Vaitkevičius
- Composer: Martijn Schimmer
- Country of origin: Lithuania
- Original language: Lithuanian
- No. of seasons: Main: 11; Kids: 3 Seniors: 1 Generations: 2

Production
- Executive producer: Gediminas Jaunius (1−)
- Producers: Talpa (2012-2018); ITV Studios (2020-present); ELITAZ

Original release
- Network: LNK
- Release: January 29, 2012 – present

Lietuvos balsas is a Lithuanian reality talent show that premiered on January 29, 2012, on the LNK. Lietuvos balsas is part of the international syndication The Voice based on the reality singing competition launched in the Netherlands as The Voice of Holland, created by Dutch television producer John de Mol Jr.

== Format ==
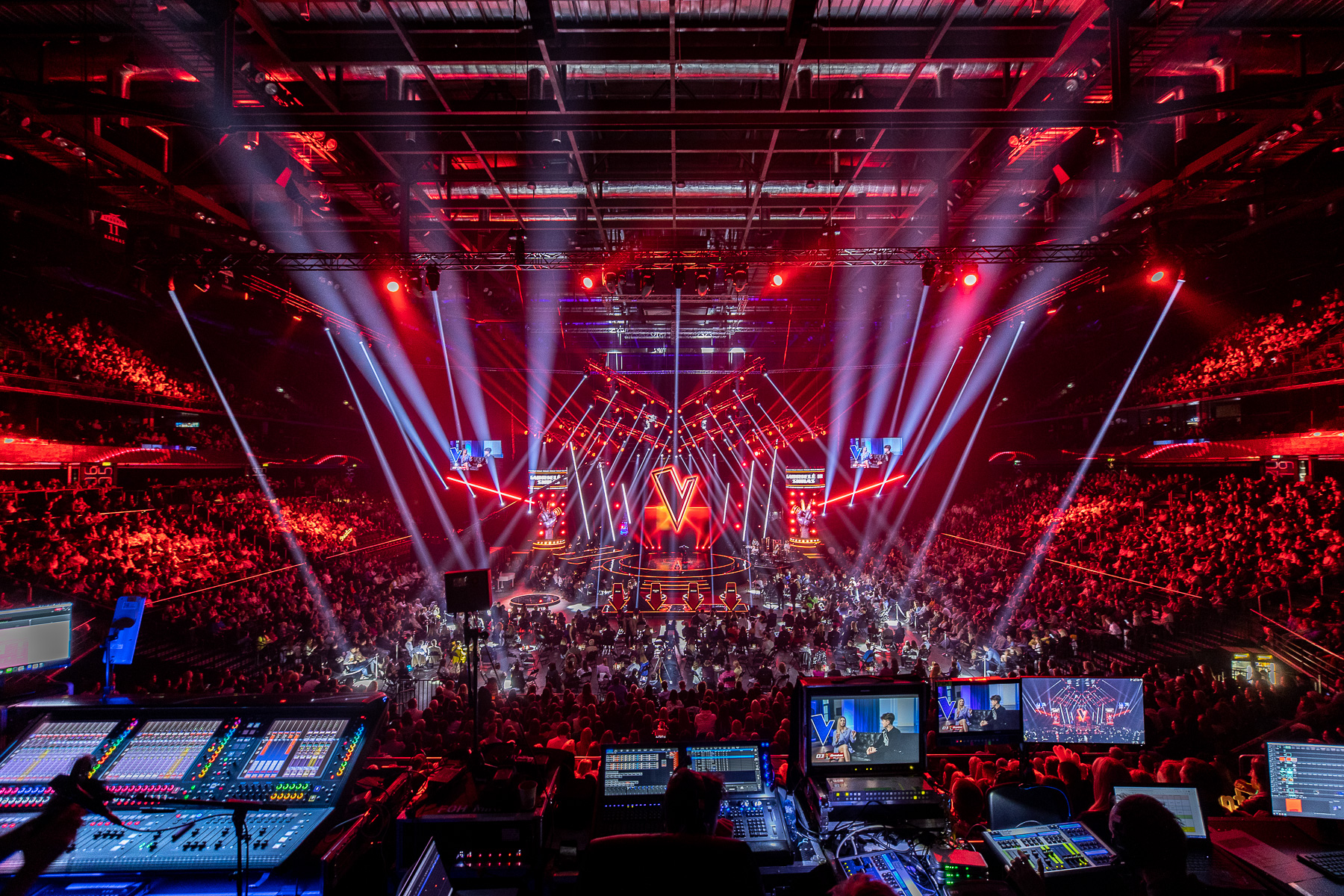
Final held in Žalgiris Arena (2023)

One of the important premises of the show is the quality of the singing talent. Four coaches, themselves popular performing artists, train the talents in their group and occasionally perform with them. Talents are selected in blind auditions, where the coaches cannot see, but only hear the auditioner. The series consists of three phases: a blind audition, a battle phase, and live performance shows. Four judges/coaches, all noteworthy recording artists, choose teams of contestants through a blind audition process. Each judge has the length of the auditioner's performance (about one minute) to decide if he or she wants that singer on his or her team; if two or more judges want the same singer (as happens frequently), the singer has the final choice of coach.

Each team of singers is mentored and developed by its respective coach. In the second stage, called the battle phase, coaches have two of their team members battle against each other directly by singing the same song together, with the coach choosing which team member to advance from each of four individual "battles" into the first live round. Within that first live round, the surviving acts from each team again compete head-to-head, with a combination of public and jury vote deciding who advances onto the next round.

In the final phase, the remaining contestants (top 8) compete against each other in live broadcasts. The television audience and the coaches have equal say 50/50 in deciding who moves on to the final 4 phase. With one team member remaining for each coach, the (final 4) contestants compete against each other in the finale with the outcome decided solely by public vote.

== Presenters ==
=== Presenters' timeline ===
Presenter	Seasons								
Presenter	1	2	3	4	5	6	7	8	9
Vytautas Rumšas Jr.									
Ugnė Skonsmanaitė	*								
Inga Jankauskaitė									
Rolandas Vilkončius									
Jonas Nainys									
Rolandas Mackevičius									

Note

- Skonsmanaitė only presented in the Live Shows phase.

=== Backstage presenters' timeline ===
Presenter	Seasons							
Presenter	1	2	3	4	5	6	7	8
Žygimantas Barysas								
Santa Audickaitė								
Šarūnas Kirdeikis								
Agnė Juškėnaitė								
Ignas Lelys								
Karolina Meschino								
Kristina Radžiukynaitė-Kayra								

== All versions' coaches ==
Coaches' timeline
Version	Coach	Seasons												
Version	Coach	1	2	3	4	5	6	7	8	9	10	11	12	13
Adults	Merūnas									—N/a		—N/a		
Adults	Violeta									—N/a		—N/a		
Adults	Egidijus									—N/a		—N/a		
Adults	Jurgis & Erica									—N/a		—N/a		
Adults	Donatas									—N/a		—N/a		
Adults	Katažina									—N/a		—N/a		
Adults	Arūnas & Inga									—N/a		—N/a		
Adults	Rūta									—N/a		—N/a		
Adults	Fara									—N/a		—N/a		
Adults	Renata & Deivis									—N/a		—N/a		
Adults	Leonas									—N/a		—N/a		
Adults	Inga									—N/a		—N/a		
Adults	Džordana									—N/a		—N/a		
Adults	Justinas									—N/a		—N/a		
Adults	Moniqué									—N/a		—N/a		
Adults	Monika Liu									—N/a		—N/a		
Adults	Mantas									—N/a		—N/a		
Adults	Benas									—N/a		—N/a		
Adults	Gabrielė									—N/a		—N/a		
Adults	Jessica Shy									—N/a		—N/a		
Adults	Free Finga									—N/a		—N/a		
Adults	Aistè									—N/a		—N/a		
Adults	Žemaitukai									—N/a		—N/a		
Kids	Donatas				—N/a									
Kids	Mantas				—N/a									
Kids	Monika Marija				—N/a									
Kids	Moniqué				—N/a									
Senior	Inga		—N/a											
Senior	Justinas		—N/a											
Senior	Mantas		—N/a											
Senior	Monika Marija		—N/a											
Generations	Benas	—N/a									—N/a		—N/a	
Generations	69 Danguje	—N/a									—N/a		—N/a	
Generations	Ieva	—N/a									—N/a		—N/a	
Generations	Vaidas	—N/a									—N/a		—N/a	
Generations	Gabrielė	—N/a									—N/a		—N/a	
Generations	Nomeda	—N/a									—N/a		—N/a	

== Series overview ==
Warning: the following table presents a significant amount of different colors.

Lietuvos balsas series overview
Season	Aired	Winner	Runner-up	Third place	Fourth place	Winning coach	Presenter(s)	Coaches (chairs' order)				
Season	Aired	Winner	Runner-up	Third place	Fourth place	Winning coach	Presenter(s)	0*	1	2	3	4
1	2012	Julija Jegorova	Giedrė Smolskaitė	Ieva Zasimauskaitė	Berta Timinskaitė	Violeta Tarasovienė	Vytautas Rumšas Jr.	—	Egidijus	Violeta	Jurgis & Erica	Merūnas
2	2013	Paulius Bagdanavičius	Monika Linkytė	Dagna Kondratavičiūtė	Goda Sasnauskaitė	Arūnas & Inga	Inga Jankauskaitė	—	Donatas	Katažina	Arūnas & Inga	Merūnas
3	2014-2015	Justina Budaitė	Agnė Juškėnaitė	Donatas & Donatas	Eglė Tamulionienė	Donatas Montvydas	Inga Jankauskaitė	—	Katažina	Merūnas	Arūnas & Inga	Donatas
4	2015-2016	Kotryna Juodzevičiūtė	Dainius Griesius	Rugilė Lingytė	Vytenis Kaluškevičius	Donatas Montvydas	Jonas Nainys	—	Donatas	Rūta	Fara	Renata & Deivis
5	2017-2018	Monika Marija	Gabija Lokytė	Gražvydas Sidiniauskas	Paulina & KAIA	Donatas Montvydas	Rolandas Mackevičius	—	Leonas	Džordana	Inga	Donatas
6	2018	Gerda Šukytė	Eglė Jurgaitytė	Nombeko Khotseng	Gabriela Ždanovičiūtė	Inga Jankauskaitė	Rolandas Mackevičius	—	Leonas	Justinas	Inga	Donatas
7	2020	Evita Cololo	Simona Jakubėnaitė	Jokūbas Mažeika	Karolina Lyndo	Justinas Jarutis	Rolandas Mackevičius	—	Donatas	Moniqué	Monika Liu	Justinas
8	2021	Meidė Šlamaitė	Liepa Malinauskaitė	Artūras Aleksiejus	Vaida Deksnytė	Moniqué	Rolandas Mackevičius	—	Justinas	Moniqué	Monika Liu	Donatas
10	2023	Anyanya Udongwo	Sidas Gvozdiovas	Vakarė Jarmalavičiūtė	Beata Beatričė	Benas Aleksandravičius	Rolandas Mackevičius	—	Justinas	Mantas	Monika Liu	Benas
12	2024-2025	Sidas Gvozdiovas	Patricija Ruzaitė	Sakalas Čumačenko	Marijanas Petrov	Mantas Jankavičius	Rolandas Mackevičius	Free Finga	Jessica Shy	Benas	Mantas	Gabrielė
13	2026	Current season					Rolandas Mackevičius	—	Mantas	Monika Liu	Aistè	Žemaitukai

- An additional chair for a secret coach, who appeared starting from the second round. In the first round, the secret coach was located behind the scenes.

== Kids version ==
Lietuvos balsas. Vaikai (The Voice of Lithuania. Kids) is the junior version of Lietuvos Balsas and is also broadcast on LNK. The kids' show was confirmed to be in production in June 2018. The first season premiered on 6 January 2019 with Donatas Montvydas, Mantas Jankavičius and Monika Marija (The Voice season 5 winner) as coaches; and Rolandas Mackevičius as host. Filming for the second season began in August 2019. The live shows for this season were held at an empty auditorium due to COVID-19. As of January 2026, season 4 has yet to be confirmed.

Lietuvos balsas. Vaikai series overview
Season	Aired	Winner	Other finalists		Winning coach	Presenters		Coaches (chairs' order)		
Season	Aired	Winner	Other finalists		Winning coach	Main	Backstage	1	2	3
1	2019	Milėja Stankevičiūtė	Vakarė Jarmalavičiūtė	Sofija Vasilevskytė	Monika Marija	Rolandas Mackevičius	Ignas Lelys	Mantas	Monika Marija	Donatas
2	2020	Matas Saukantas	Barbora Žižytė	Grėtė Stravinskaitė	Monika Marija	Rolandas Mackevičius	Karolina Meschino	Mantas	Monika Marija	Donatas
3	2021	Džiugas Joneikis	Amelija Kumetytė	Atėnė Ravinkaitė	Mantas Jankavičius	Rolandas Mackevičius	Karolina Meschino	Mantas	Moniqué	Donatas

== Seniors version ==
Lietuvos balsas. Senjorai (The Voice of Lithuania. Senior) is the senior version of Lietuvos Balsas, designed exclusive to people of more than 60 years old and is also broadcast on LNK. The senior edition was confirmed to be in production in early January 2019. On June 24, 2019, it was announced that Justinas Jarutis, Inga Jankauskaitė, Monika Marija and Mantas Jankavičius would become coaches for the first season. Rolandas Mackevičius also host the senior's version.

The winner of the first season is Gedeminas Jepšas from team Monika Marija.

Lietuvos balsas. Senjorai series overview
Season	Aired	Winner	Runner-up	Other finalists		Winning coach	Presenters		Coaches (chairs' order)			
Season	Aired	Winner	Runner-up	Other finalists		Winning coach	Main	Backstage	1	2	3	4
1	2019	Gedeminas Jepšas	Antanas Gaudiešius	Arvydas Griškevičius	Nijolė Giedraitienė	Monika Marija	Rolandas Mackevičius	Karolina Meschino	Mantas	Monika Marija	Inga	Justinas

== Generations version ==
In 2021, Lietuvos balsas. Kartos was announced to be broadcast in 2022. This version is "The Voice of Lithuania: Generations", where groups of family members of several ages perform together. Although this version is airing first, the original network of this new idea was Seven Network, owner of the Australian The Voice. In November 2021, a brand new coaching panel was announced: the first-ever trio on the Lithuanian version, 69 Danguje; Ba. lead singer, Benas Aleksandravičius; Ieva Prudnikovaitė; and Vaidas Baumila.

Lietuvos balsas. Kartos series overview
Season	Aired	Winner	Runner-up	Third place	Fourth place	Winning coach	Presenters		Coaches (chairs' order)			
Season	Aired	Winner	Runner-up	Third place	Fourth place	Winning coach	Main	Backstage	1	2	3	4
9	2022	Hey! Mix	Fresco	Milėja ir Jessica	Eglė ir Raigardas	Vaidas Baumila	Rolandas Mackevičius	Ieva Mackevičienė	Vaidas	Ieva	Benas	69 Danguje
11	2024	T3	Emilija ir Rugilė	Erica ir Pranas	Fuzija	Nomeda Kazlaus	Rolandas Mackevičius	Ieva Mackevičienė	Vaidas	Gabrielė	Benas	Nomeda
