= Vingis Park =

Park in Vilnius, Lithuania

- Vingio Parkas
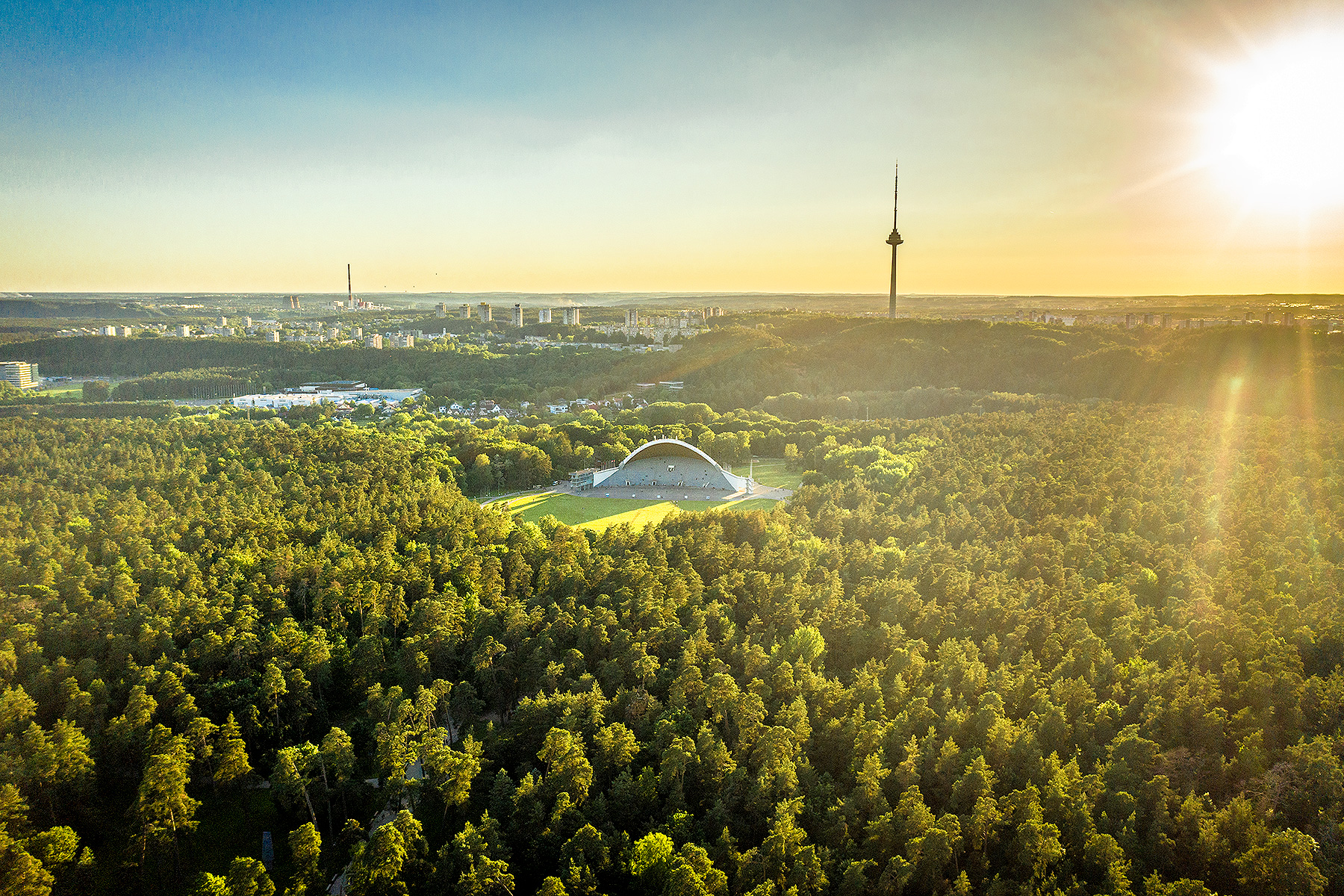

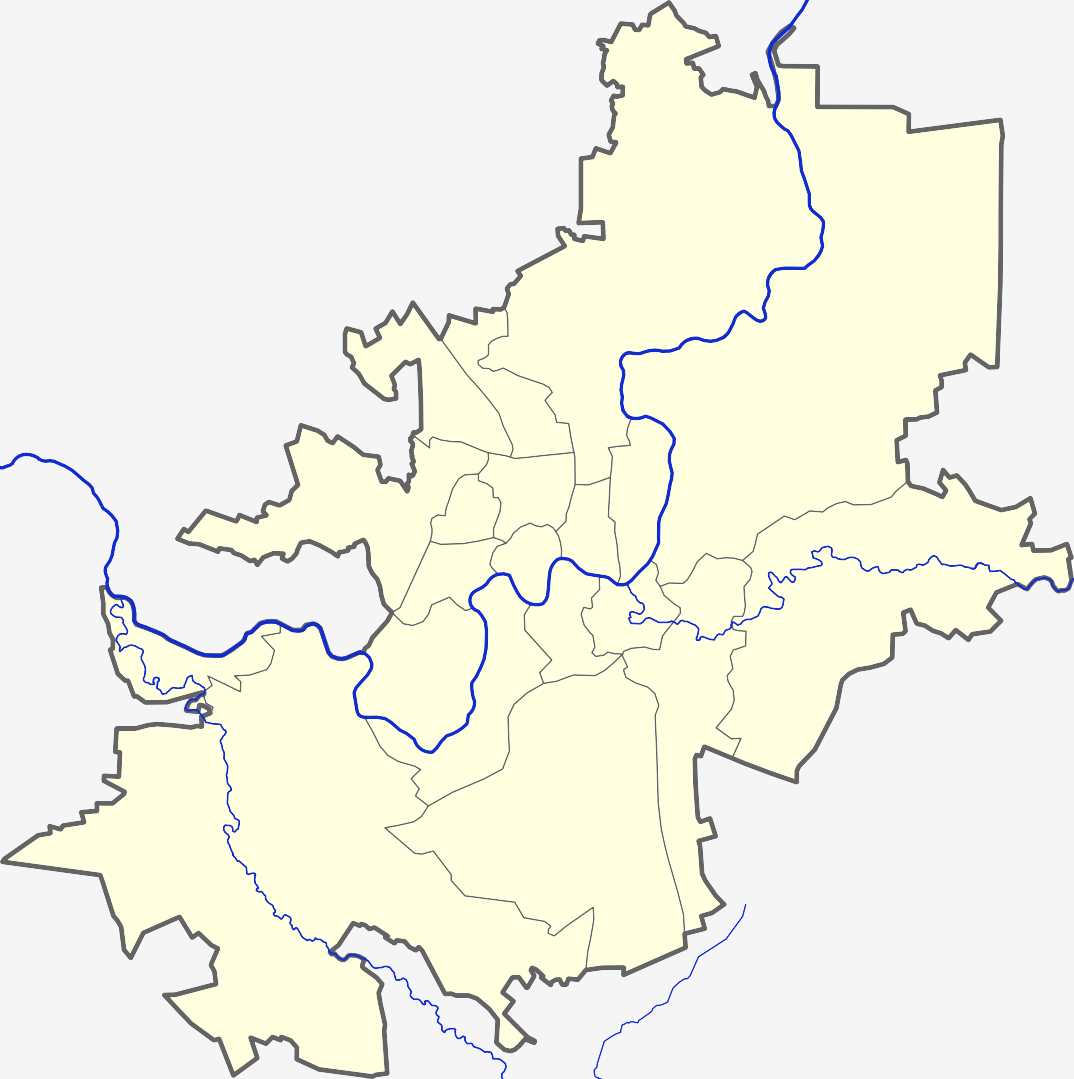
- Location within Vilnius
- Type: Public park
- Location: Vilnius
- Coordinates: 54°41′0″N 25°14′23″E
- Area: 157 ha (390 acres)
- Operator: Vilniaus miesto parkai
- Open: Open, year-round
- Status: Existing
- Website: www.vilniausparkai.lt/vingio-parkas/

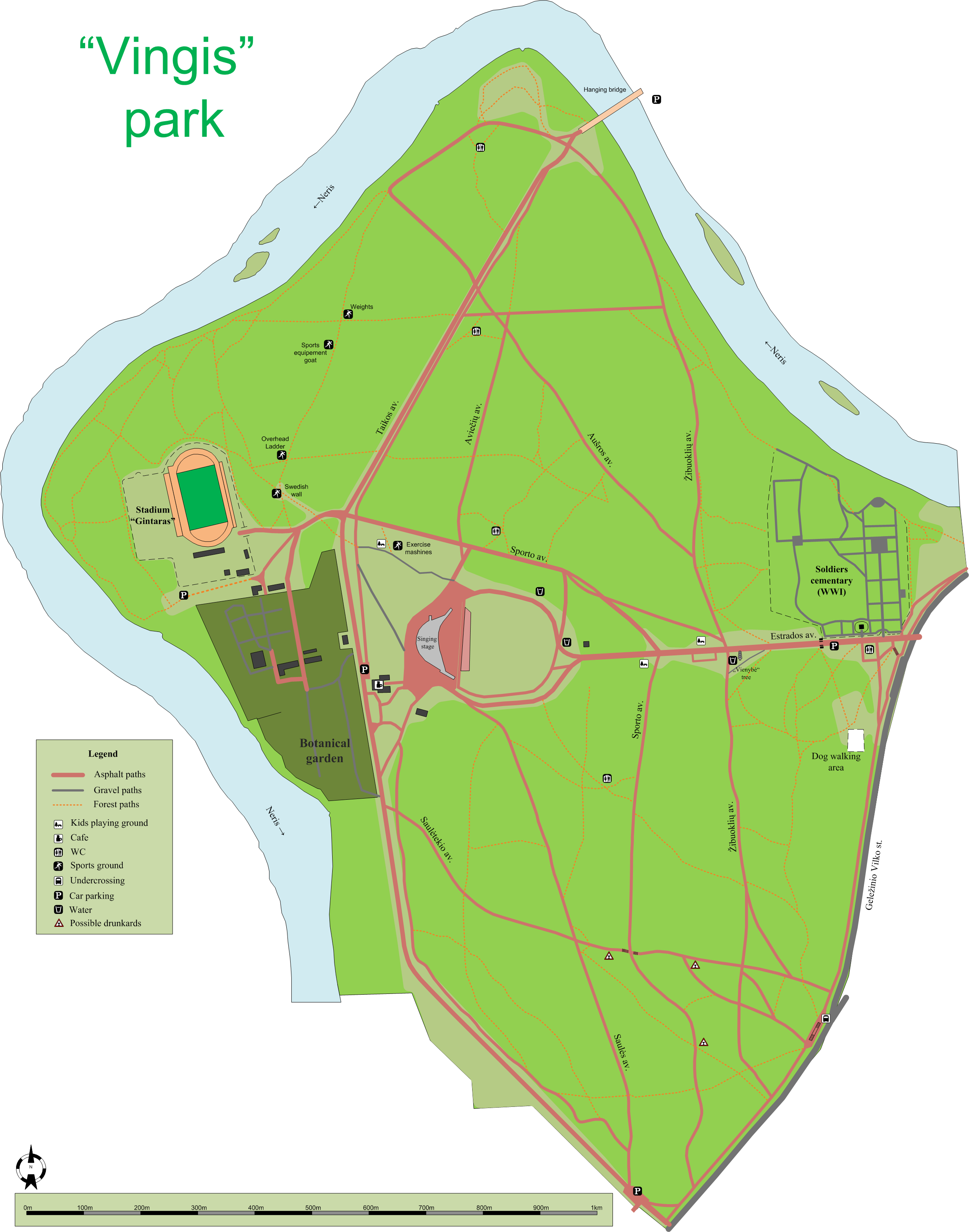
Vingis Park map

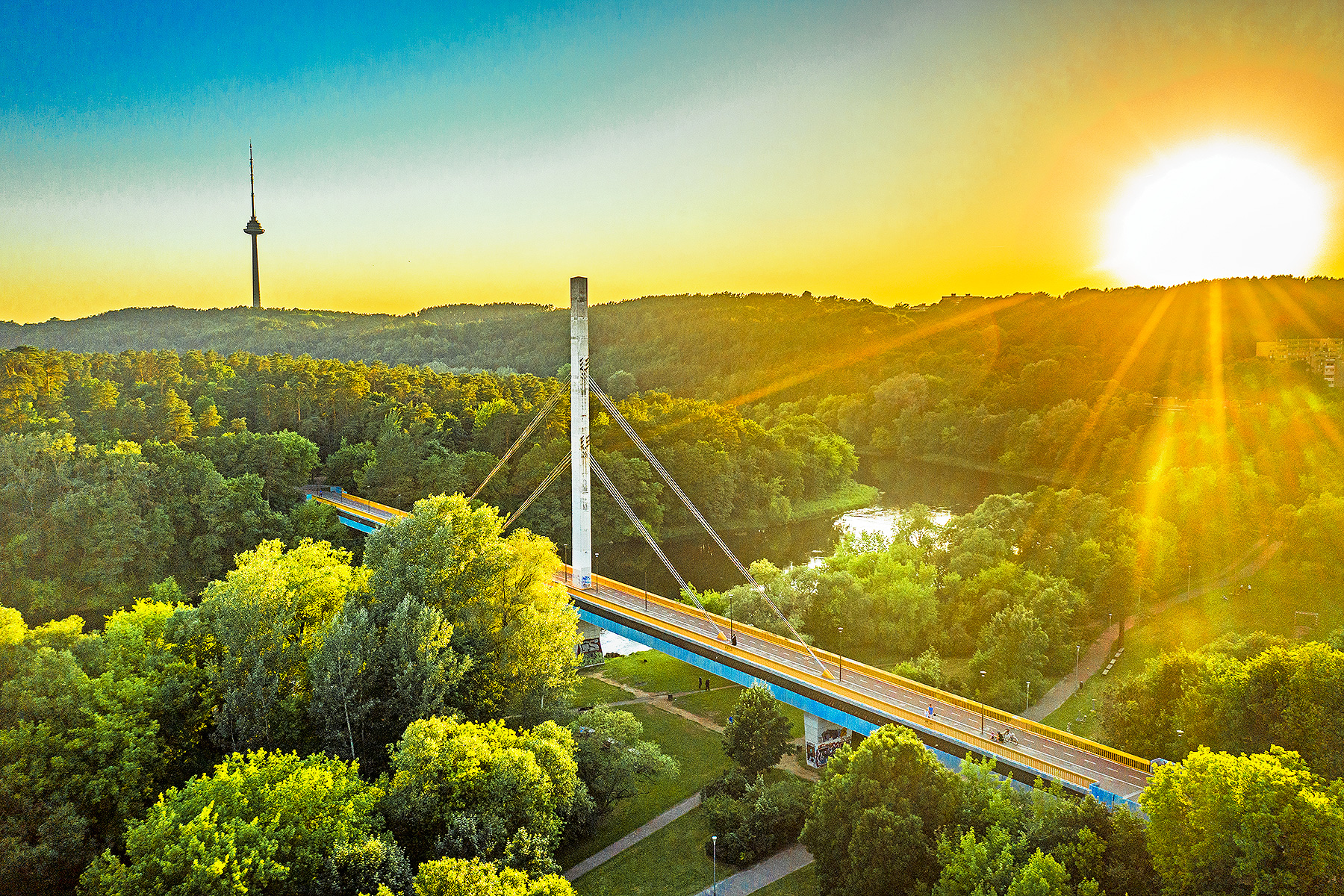
Pedestrian bridge to the park

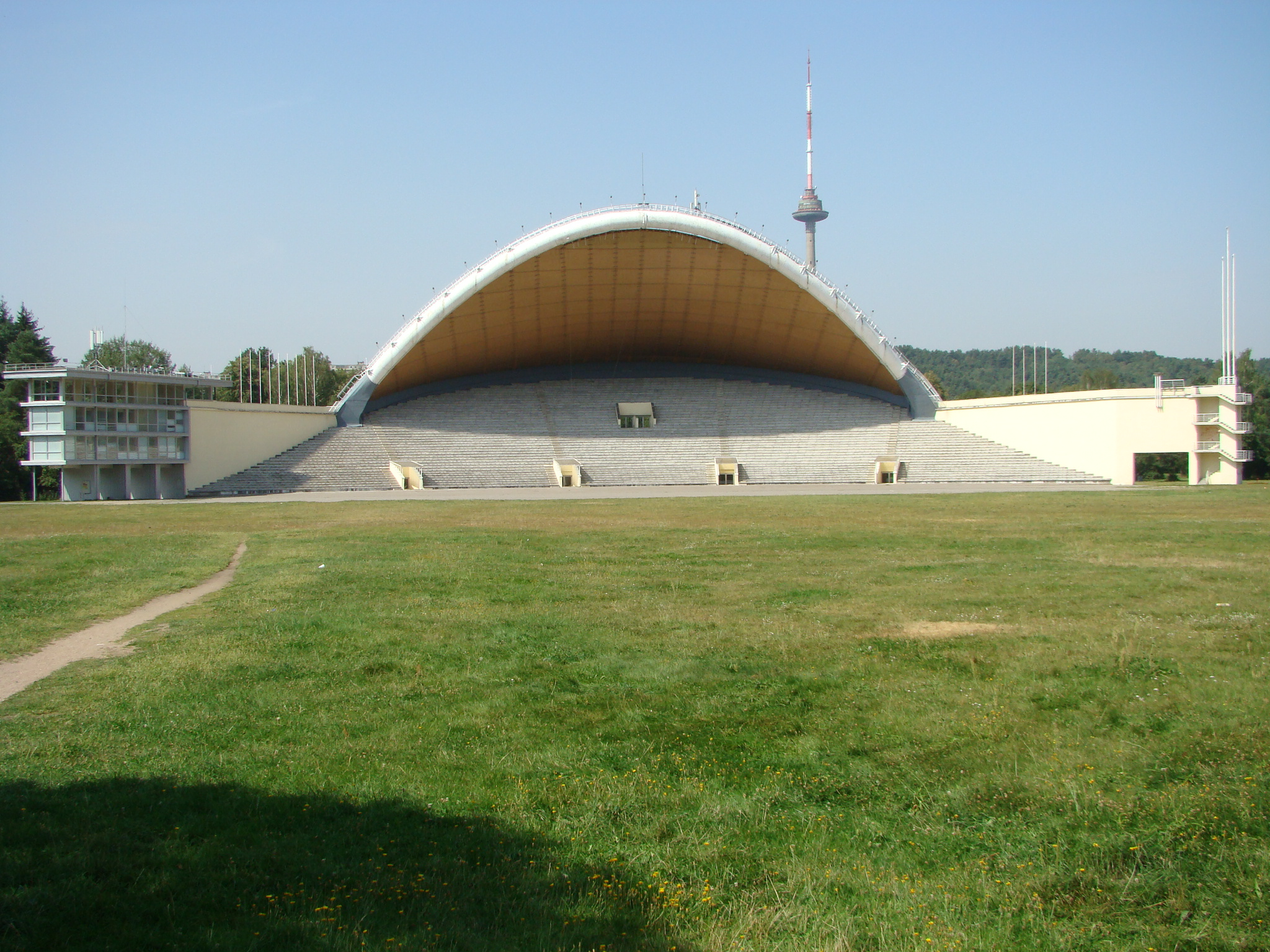
Amphitheater in Vingis Park

Vingis Park (Lithuanian: Vingio parkas) is the largest park in Vilnius, Lithuania, covering 162 hectares (400 acres). It is located in the Vilkpėdė eldership near a curve of the Neris River, hence its Lithuanian name "vingis" which means "bend" or "curve". A pedestrian bridge connects the park with Žvėrynas. It is used as a venue for various events, especially concerts and sports competitions. It contains a stadium, an amphitheater, and a department of the Botanical Garden of Vilnius University.

== History ==
The park's history dates back several centuries.

=== Palace in Zakret ===
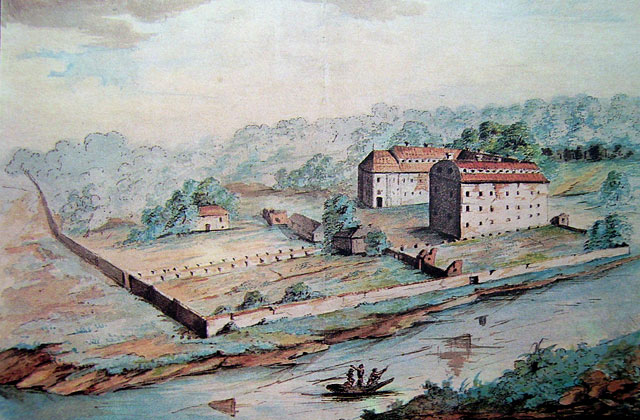
Palace of Levin von Bennigsen in Zakret by Marcelis Jannuszewicz (1836)

Vingis also has a historical Polish name for the location: Zakręt (with the same meaning). It was the site of a Palace in Zakret, that was eventually bought by the local Russian governor general of Vilna Governorate, Levin August von Bennigsen, in 1801. Prior to his purchase, it was a Jesuit palace built on a design by Johann Christoph Glaubitz.

Bennigsen's palace in Zakret is where, during a ball that took place on the night of 24/25 June 1812, Tzar Alexander I of Russia received the first news about the French invasion of Russia by the Grand Army of Napoleon Bonaparte. As Vilnius was close to the frontier where the invasion took place, Alexander and his entourage left the area in a hurry. This event was immortalised in Tolstoy's account of it in War and Peace (Book 9 Chapter 3).

Later that year, during the invasion, the palace was used as a French military hospital, until it caught fire and was badly damaged. After the war, it was not renovated, and in 1855, the remains were demolished.

=== Redevelopment as an amphitheater ===
In 1965, the park was redeveloped and adapted to the needs of mass events, such as concerts or political rallies. The amphitheater was built using a modified design of the Estonian Song Festival Grounds in Tallinn. Several major rallies and demonstrations were held there during the course of the Lithuanian independence movement of the late 1980s; a rally on August 23, 1988 drew 250,000 people.

== Events ==
Many celebrities have performed at this venue, including Andrea Bocelli, Elton John, Björk, Sting, Rod Stewart, Depeche Mode, and famous Lithuanian music groups like Foje and Antis. The record for most attendants was set in 1997, when Foje performed their last concert - over 60,000 fans were there.

Lady Gaga performed at this venue for her first concert in a Baltic country on August 21, 2012, as a part of her The Born This Way Ball Tour, in front of 14,853 people.

On November 7, 2016, Robbie Williams announced that he will be performing at the venue on August 16, 2017.

German band Rammstein announced they would start their European stadium tour there on the 22nd of May 2023.

On October 9, 2025, it was announced that tickets for the concert of Lithuanian artist Jessica Shy had sold out within 24 hours during the pre-sale period. On October 10, an additional concert was announced. This was the first time in the history of Vingis Park that an additional concert had been held.

== Concerts ==
Concerts at Vingis Park
Date	Artist	Tour	Attendance
17 May 1997	Foje	Foje Farewell Concert Tour	60,000
9 May 1998	Naktines personos	Atvirai	30,000
1999	Hiperbolė	—	—
31 August 2001	Depeche Mode	Exciter Tour	20,000+
1 September 2006	Elton John	Elton John 2006 European Tour	30,000+
13 July 2008	Björk	Volta tour	—
31 July 2008	Andrea Bocelli	Andrea Bocelli in Concert Tour	18,000+
10 June 2010	Rod Stewart	Soulbook Tour	—
27 June 2011	Sting	Symphonicity Tour	—
21 August 2012	Lady Gaga	The Born This Way Ball Tour	14,853
27 July 2013	Depeche Mode	The Delta Machine Tour	23,794
16 August 2017	Robbie Williams	The Heavy Entertainment Show Tour	about 30,000
11 June 2022	ba.	ba. 10	—
22 May 2023	Rammstein	Rammstein Stadium Tour	33,290
9 June 2023	Andrius Mamontovas		20,000+
16 August 2023	Imagine Dragons	Mercury World Tour	42,013
2 September 2023	Justinas Jarutis		about 10,000
7 June 2024	Leon Somov & Jazzu	One Night Only	about 20,000
2 August 2025	Armin van Buuren	The ORB	
13 September 2025	Lilas ir Innomine		about 20,000
28-29 August 2026	Jessica Shy		about 100,000

== Sports ==
- Vingis Park Stadium, seen on the map of the park (a.k.a. Vilnius Gintaras Stadium, to distinguish from the older, but abandoned Gintaras Stadium) formerly belonging to the sports club Gintaras
- Vingis Park Rugby Stadium
- Archery field
- Tennis court
- Basketball court
