= Jonas Jarutis =

Lithuanian politician

Deputy Speaker of the Seimas
- Incumbent
- Assumed office 3 December 2020

Member of Seimas
- Incumbent
- Assumed office 14 November 2016
- Constituency: Multi-member

Personal details
- Born: 25 May 1963 (age 63) Viekšniai, Akmenė District, Lithuania
- Party: Lithuanian Farmers and Greens Union
- Education: Šiauliai Pedagogical Institute; Kaunas Institute of Physical Education

Jonas Jarutis (born 25 May 1963) is a Lithuanian politician who has served as the Deputy Speaker of Seimas of Republic of Lithuania since 2020.

== Biography ==
Jarutis was born in the village of Viekšniai, Mažeikiai District Municipality, Northern Lithuania.

Jarutis graduated from Viekšniai secondary school in 1981 and Šiauliai Pedagogical Institute in 1985. In 1990 he graduated from Lithuanian State Institute of Physical Education (now Lithuanian Sports University).

Jarutis was one of the local activists of National Renaissance – Independence movement of late 1980's (Sąjūdis in Lithuanian). He was among proponents and participants of return of burials of Lithuanian victims of Soviet terror from Siberia.

Having worked as a teacher from 1985 until 1990, he took first post of local self-government, serving as administrator of rural district (viršaitis in Lithuanian) of Skapiškis in 1990–1995.

== Political life ==
After rural districts were abolished in the course of 1993-1994 municipal reform in Lithuania, Jonas Jarutis started own business, which he has closed in 2007 after being elected a Deputy Mayor, and latter the same year – Mayor of Kupiškis District Municipality (until 2015).

He joined then Lithuanian Peasants' Party in 1995 and took place in subsequent municipal elections of 1997, 2000, 2002, 2007, 2011 and 2015. He was elected councillor of Kupiškis District Municipality from 2000 onwards.

In 2016 General elections he was elected a member of Seimas of Republic of Lithuania, where he became deputy chair of Lithuanian Greens and Peasant's Union's fraction.

After re-election in 2020 General elections, Jarutis, as the representative of largest opposition party, became Deputy Speaker of the Seimas.

== Private life ==
Jarutis is divorced and has two children. His younger son Justinas is a famous Lithuanian pop singer.

Jonas Jarutis is fluent in German and Russian.
