= Jonas Nainys =

Lithuanian music producer, host of radio and television (born 1983)

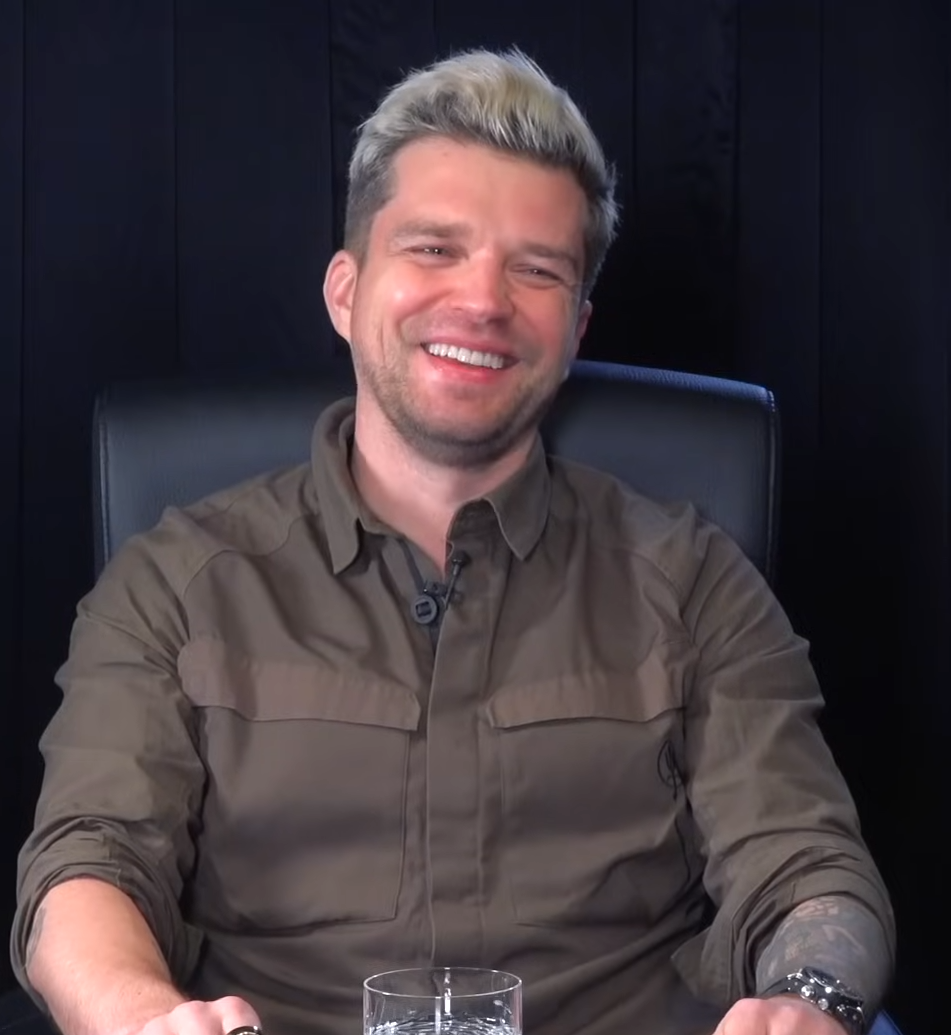
- Jovani in November 2024

Background information
- Also known as: DJ Jovani
- Born: 25 June 1983 (age 42); Pasvalys, Lithuania
- Occupations: DJ; record producer; television personality; Zenius; Winamp
- Instruments: Digital audio workstation; keyboard; synthesiser
- Years active: 1998 – present
- Labels: Warner Music UK

Jonas Nainys (born 25 June 1983), better known by his stage name DJ Jovani, is a Lithuanian music producer, radio and television host.

== Early life and education ==
Jonas Nainys was born on 25 June 1983 in Pasvalys. He attended Petras Vileišis school in Pasvalys. He enrolled in Vilnius University Šiauliai Academy and earned a bachelor's degree in philosophy.

== Career ==
In 1998, Nainys made his debut appearance as a DJ at a school event. In 2003, he began performing at several nightclubs. After that, Nainys started his broadcasting career on the local radio station, Saulės Radijas.

In 2006, he first gained fame through his appearance on the LNK reality show Lith. Ideali pora and won it.

Nainys hosted the Jovani At Club program that focussed on nightlife and nightclub culture. During this program, Jonas interviewed many famous musicians, including Fedde Le Grand, Funkerman, Tiësto, David Guetta, James Zabiela. Soon after, Nainys became a host at the radio station ZIP FM.

In 2007, he co-founded the Radistai DJs, a musical group and event-management firm, with Rolandas Mackeviius.

In 2013, Nainys released the music album On Air, which was recorded in collaboration with Vaidas Baumila, Justinas Jarutis, Linas Adomaitis, and others. It contains thirteen dance tracks, and 15,000 copies were sold in Lithuania.

Radistai DJs released their second album, On Road, after a three-year hiatus, which likewise sold 15,000 copies. One song on this album, "Good Things", was noticed by the American record label Warner Music and released under its name. They also started organizing arena events in 2013.

In 2017, he nominated for the Electronic Act of the Year award at the Music Association Awards of the Year.

Radistai DJs celebrated Christmas in 2019 at the Žalgiris Arena in Kaunas. Musicians, including Vaidas Baumila, Justinas Jarutis, Mantas Wizard, Donatas Montvydas, Monika Linkytė, Flying Saucer Gang, and Mad Money, performed at these events.

In 2019, Radistai DJs launched the Inconvenient Questions Show (Lith. Nepatogūs klausimai). The show is broadcast by the news portal Delfi.lt and many famous Lithuanian personalities have appeared on the show.

=== Personal life ===
Jonas Nainys and his wife Simona are dog lovers and currently own three dogs—two (Bichon Frises) and one rescue dog named Bruno. Nainys has said that “he could have fifteen dogs” and that he wishes Bruno could stay with him 24 hours a day.

=== Notable shows ===
- M.A.M.A. awards event, 2012
- M.A.M.A. awards event, 2014
- Season four of Lietuvos balsas, 2015
- First season of the LNK show Women vs. Men (Lith. Moterys prieš vyrus), 2015
- LNK show Good One! (Lith. Čia tai geras!), 2017
- Second season of the show Women vs. Men (Lith. Moterys prieš vyrus), 2017
