= LNK =

LNK or lnk is a three letter acronym that has several meanings:

- IATA airport code for Lincoln Airport, Nebraska, US
- Amtrak station code for Lincoln, Nebraska (Amtrak station)
- LNK (Lithuanian TV channel), Lithuania
- .lnk, a computer file extension

== See also ==
- WinLNK.Agent
