= Radži =

- Also known as: Radži, Radžis
- Born: Radži Aleksandrovičius; February 14, 1987 (age 39); Panevėžys, Lithuania
- Origin: Lithuania
- Genre: Pop
- Occupation: Singer
- Years active: 2006–present

Radžis Aleksandrovičius, also known by his stage name Radži (born February 14, 1987) is a Lithuanian pop singer of Roma descent.

In 2008 he was nominated for "the biggest evil in Lithuanian music" at an awards ceremony highlighting the "worst" musicians in Lithuania.

== Discography ==
Radži has recorded 4 studio albums:

- Ką daryt? (2007)
- Visko būna (2007)
- Pagyvensim pamatysim (2009)
- Mano didelės storos čigoniškos vestuvės (2012)
