= Vienna Mozart Orchestra =

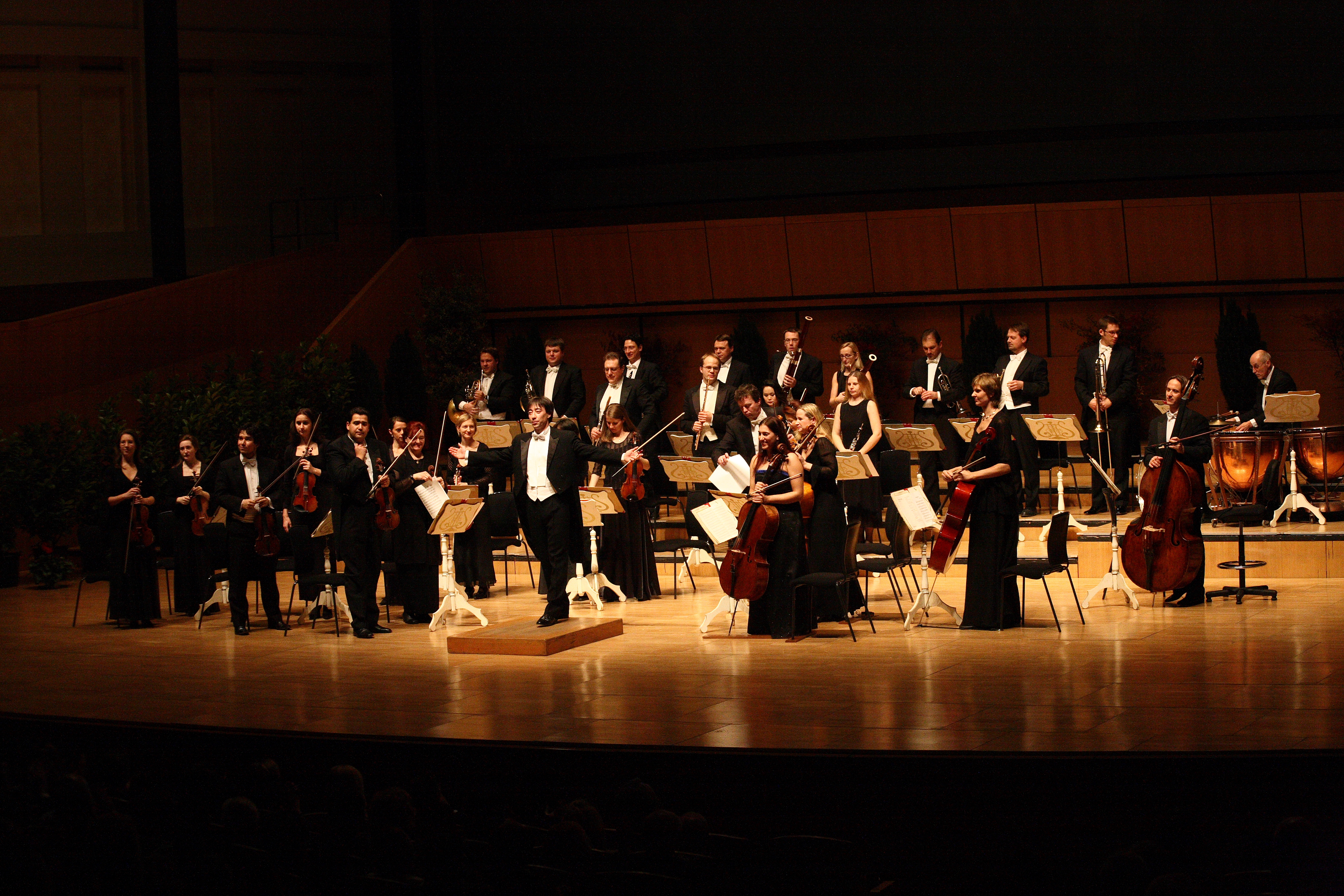
Vienna Mozart Orchestra

The Vienna Mozart Orchestra, with its 30 musicians, was founded in 1986 and has devoted itself entirely to that great composer of the Viennese classical period, Wolfgang Amadeus Mozart. Since its foundation 36 years ago, the orchestra has found a permanent place in Viennese concert life, becoming a fixture in the City of Vienna's musical programmes for tourist entertainment every summer.

== The orchestra ==
A number of musicians from famous Viennese orchestras and ensembles collaborate with the Vienna Mozart Orchestra as soloists and conductors, among them members of the Vienna Philharmonic and the Vienna Symphony orchestras. In addition, singers from world-famous opera houses, principally from the Vienna State Opera and the Vienna Volksoper, perform with the Vienna Mozart Orchestra.

== The concerts ==
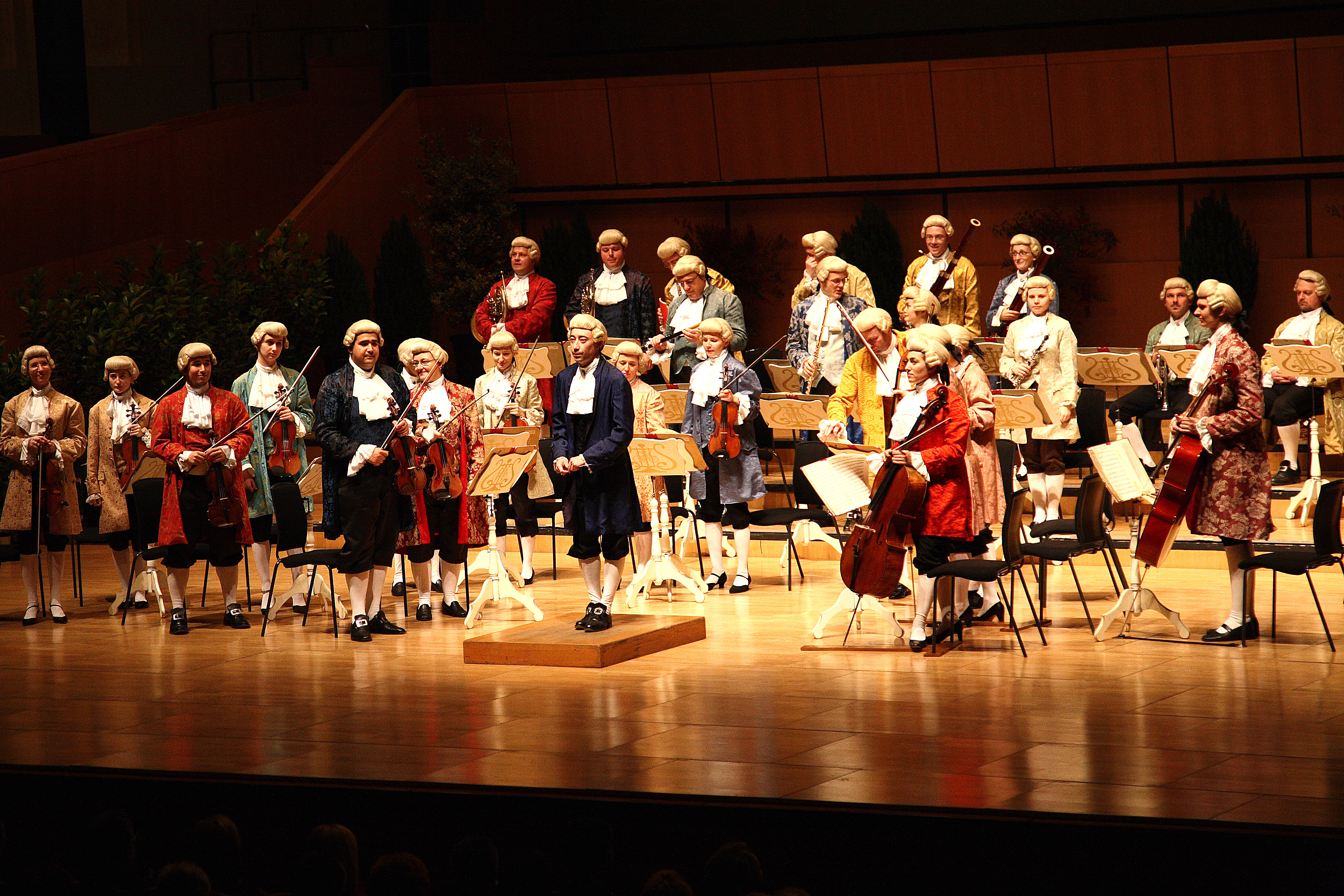
Vienna Mozart Orchestra in historical costumes

Best-known and most popular is the concert series "Vienna Mozart Concerts in historical costumes", performed every year from May until the end of October, four times a week. An ideal background for these concerts is provided by the Golden Hall of the Musikverein, the Vienna State Opera and by the Great Hall of the Konzerthaus (each about 40 concerts a year).

As a co-production with Klangbogen Wien within the framework of the Millennium celebrations in 1996, ten open-air concerts were performed on the Millennium stage in front of Schloss Schönbrunn.

A guest performance during the Carinthian Summer in Ossiach in August 1997, under the leadership of Ernst Ottensamer, member of the Vienna Philharmonic Orchestra, was a great success.

In June 1996, the Vienna Mozart Orchestra performed in front of an illustrious international audience during a gala evening at the Vienna Hofburg organised by the Chase Manhattan Bank.

== On tour ==
Beyond its regular concert program at the most important concert halls in its home city, the Vienna Mozart Orchestra develops intensive tour activities all around the world. The orchestra has visited Japan eight times, and had the honour of opening the 1991 Mozart Year in Tokyo and to represent Austria at the Festival Internacional Cervantino in Mexico in 2002. Further guest performances have taken the orchestra to Taiwan, Korea, Singapore, Morocco, Malta, Germany, Slovenia, Italy, Spain, Greece, Canada, USA, Brazil, Panama, Turkey, Guatemala, Ukraine, Bulgaria and Cyprus.
