= Jessica Shy =

Lithuanian singer (born 1996)

- Born: Džesika Šyvokaitė; 6 May 1996 (age 30); Birštonas, Lithuania
- Genres: Pop, R&B, Electro-Pop, Dance-Pop
- Occupations: Singer; songwriter
- Years active: 2019–present
- Label: OpenPlay
- Website: jessicashy.lt

Džesika Šyvokaitė (born 6 May 1996), better known by the stage name Jessica Shy, is a Lithuanian singer and songwriter.

== Early life ==
Shy was born in Birštonas, Lithuania. She began singing at the age of four and a half, and attended Birštonas Music School, where she studied pop singing. She graduated from the University of Westminster in London with a degree in Commercial Music Performance.

== Career ==
Jessica competed on reality competition shows 2 minutės šlovės and X Faktorius. She was a competitor on Choir Wars for two seasons. In 2019, she signed with music label OpenPlay. She rose to prominence after releasing several singles, namely "Rožė", which marked her first solo entry on the Lithuanian singles chart. She was nominated for "Breakthrough of the Year" at the 2020 MAMA Awards.

In 2021, she collaborated with Justinas Jarutis on the track "Rugpjūtis". The song marked Shy's first number-one hit on the Lithuanian Singles Chart, and would later be nominated for "Song of the Year" at the 2021 MAMA Awards.

On 14 January 2022, she released "Šokam lėtai", the first single from her debut studio album Apkabinti prisiminimus, which debuted at number 1 on the Lithuanian Singles Chart. She released the album on 25 January 2022. Upon release, the album debuted at number 1 on the Lithuanian Albums Chart, with all tracks charting in the top 100. Shy later released "Ar Įsileisi" and "Tyliai pakuždėk" as singles, with the latter in collaboration with Nombeko Augustė. The song peaked at number 1 and earned the duo a nomination for "Song of the Year" at the 2022 MAMA Awards.

On 25 November 2022, she released "Žiburiai", the first single from her second studio album Pasaka. The album's second single, "Dėl tavęs", was released on 19 January 2023. Pasaka was released on 10 March 2023, and debuted at number one on the Lithuanian Albums Chart. In support of the album, she embarked on an arena tour across Lithuania. At the 2023 MAMA Awards, she received a total of nine nominations – the most for any artist – winning a total of six.

Together with Silvestras Beltė and Elena Jurgaitytė, she co-wrote "Luktelk", the Lithuanian entry in the Eurovision Song Contest 2024.

On 31 May 2024, she released Sutemos, her third studio album. The record was preceded by the single “Žvaigždės”, which introduced a more mature and atmospheric sound. The album debuted at number one on the Lithuanian Albums Chart, becoming her third consecutive chart-topping project, with all tracks entering the national charts. Sutemos marked a new creative phase in her career, featuring a more introspective tone and refined pop production, while further solidifying her status as one of Lithuania’s leading pop artists.

The album’s songs were presented live on 30 August 2024 during her largest solo concert to date at Darius and Girėnas Stadium, which drew a crowd of 39,599 attendees. The event became one of the most attended concerts in Lithuania’s history, ranking as the second-largest ever held by a Lithuanian artist.

On 12 June 2025, Jessica Shy released her fourth studio album, Žvėris. The album followed her previous record Sutemos (2024) and continued her exploration of contemporary pop music. Comprising nine tracks, Žvėris features production by Karolis Labanauskas and Linas Strockis. The lead single, “Vis vien”, was released prior to the album and achieved commercial success in Lithuania, reaching the top position on national music charts. The album also includes tracks such as “Manija”, “Aš tik žmogus”, “Ašara”, and the title track “Žvėris”. Upon its release, Žvėris received significant attention in Lithuania and contributed to Shy’s continued commercial success, with her releases consistently performing strongly on national charts.

In July 2025, she performed a record-breaking residency at Kalnų parkas in Vilnius, becoming the first Lithuanian artist to sell out three consecutive nights (17–19 July) at the venue. The concert series drew tens of thousands of fans and was noted for its high-scale production, which included a revolving stage, pyrotechnics, and a signature "musical box" set piece. The concert series drew a total attendance of approximately 34,000 fans.

Following this success, the artist announced via Instagram her most ambitious project to date: a solo concert at Vingis Park scheduled for 29 August 2026. After the first show sold out in under 24 hours during the presale phase alone, a second date (28 August) was added. Both nights sold out rapidly, with a combined total of 100,000 tickets sold (approximately 50,000 per night). This achievement made Jessica Shy the first Lithuanian solo artist to schedule and sell out two consecutive headline shows at the country’s largest outdoor venue.

== Discography ==
=== Albums ===
Title	Details	Peak chart positions
Title	Details	LTU
Apkabinti prisiminimus	Released: 25 January 2022; Label: OpenPlay; Formats: LP, digital download, streaming	1
Pasaka	Released: 10 March 2023; Label: OpenPlay; Formats: LP, digital download, streaming	1
Sutemos	Released: 31 May 2024; Label: OpenPlay; Formats: LP, digital download, streaming	1
Žvėris	Released: 12 June 2025; Label: OpenPlay; Formats: LP, digital download, streaming	1
Liepa	Released: 3 July 2026; Label: OpenPlay; Formats: LP, digital download, streaming	1

=== Singles ===
Title	Year	Peak chart positions	Album
Title	Year	LTU	Album
"Viskas ką turiu"	2019	—	Non-album singles
"Nebenoriu laukt"	2019	—	Non-album singles
"Nei man kąu" (with Niko Barisas)	2019	—	Non-album singles
"Stadionai" (with Rokas)	2019	81	Non-album singles
"Surašyt žvagždes"	2019	—	Non-album singles
"Rožė"	2020	15	Non-album singles
"20 Seconds"	2020	—	Non-album singles
"Alright" (with Justinas Jarutis)	2020	84	Non-album singles
"Taip atsitiko"	2020	—	Non-album singles
"Oras ir vanduo"	2020	—	Non-album singles
"Liūdnos Kalėdos" (with Rokas)	2020	—	Non-album singles
"Noriu rėkt"	2021	—	Non-album singles
"Tu palauk" (with Justinas Jarutis)	2021	7	Non-album singles
"Užmerk man akis"	2021	—	Non-album singles
"Rugpjūtis" (with Justinas Jarutis)	2021	1	Non-album singles
"Šokam lėtai"	2022	1	Apkabinti prisiminimus
"Ar Įsileisi"	2022	72	Apkabinti prisiminimus
"Tyliai pakuždėk"	2022	1	Apkabinti prisiminimus
"Žiburiai"	2022	7	Pasaka
"Dėl tavęs"	2023	1	Pasaka
"—" denotes a recording that did not chart or was not released in that territory.

== Awards and nominations ==
Year	Award	Category	Song	Result
2021	M.A.M.A. 2020	Breakthrough of the Year		Nomination
2022	M.A.M.A. 2021	Pop Artist of the Year		Nomination
2022	M.A.M.A. 2021	Song of the Year	„Rugpjūtis“ (ft. Justinas Jarutis)	Nomination
2023	M.A.M.A. 2022	Pop Artist of the Year		Winner
2023	M.A.M.A. 2022	Artist of the Year		Nomination
2023	M.A.M.A. 2022	Song of the Year	„Tyliai pakuždėk“	Nomination
2024	M.A.M.A. 2023	Album of the Year	„Pasaka“	Winner
2024	M.A.M.A. 2023	Music Video of the Year	„Dėl Tavęs“	Nomination
2024	M.A.M.A. 2023	Music Video of the Year	„Pasaka“ (ft. Elayork)	Nomination
2024	M.A.M.A. 2023	Artist of the Year		Winner
2024	M.A.M.A. 2023	Concert Artist of the Year		Winner
2024	M.A.M.A. 2023	Pop Artist of the Year		Winner
2024	M.A.M.A. 2023	Song of the Year	„Apkabink“	Winner
2024	M.A.M.A. 2023	Song of the Year	„Dėl Tavęs“	Nomination
2024	M.A.M.A. 2023	Most listened to song on the M.A.M.A TOP 40 playlist	„Dėl Tavęs“	Winner
2025	M.A.M.A. 2024	Most listened to song on the M.A.M.A TOP 40 playlist	„Žvaigždės“	Nomination
2025	M.A.M.A. 2024	Pop Artist of the Year		Winner
2025	M.A.M.A. 2024	Concert Artist of the Year	Darius ir Girėnas stadium	Winner
2025	M.A.M.A. 2024	Music Video of the Year	,,Žvaigždės"	Nomination
2025	M.A.M.A. 2024	Album of the Year	„Sutemos“	Nomination
2025	M.A.M.A. 2024	Artist of the Year		Winner
2025	M.A.M.A. 2024	Song of the Year	„1000 vėtrų“	Nomination
2025	M.A.M.A. 2024	„LATGA“ most popular songwriter		Winner
2025	Lietaus muzikos apdovanojimai 2024	Artist of the Year		Winner
2025	Lietaus muzikos apdovanojimai 2024	Song of the Year	„1000 vėtrų“	Nomination
2025	M1 muzikos apdovanojimai 2025	Artist of the Year		Winner
2025	M1 muzikos apdovanojimai 2025	Song of the Year	„Vis Vien“	Nomination
2025	M1 muzikos apdovanojimai 2025	Metų koncertas	Kalnų parkas	Winner
2025	M1 muzikos apdovanojimai 2025	Album of the Year	„Žvėris“	Winner
2026	M.A.M.A. 2025	Pop Artist of the Year		Nomination
2026	M.A.M.A. 2025	Concert Artist of the Year		Winner
2026	M.A.M.A. 2025	Album of the Year	„Žvėris“	Nomination
2026	M.A.M.A. 2025	Artist of the Year		Winner
2026	M.A.M.A. 2025	Song of the Year	„Vis Vien“ (aut. K. Labanauskas, L. Strockis, Dž. Šyvokaitė, E. Borsteikaitė)	Nomination
2026	M.A.M.A. 2025	Song of the Year	„Žvėris“ (aut. K. Labanauskas, L. Strockis, Dž. Šyvokaitė, E. Borsteikaitė, N. A. Khotseng)	Nomination
2026	M.A.M.A. 2025	,,LATGA" Author of the Year		Nomination
