= Ba. (band) =

Lithuanian musical group

ba.
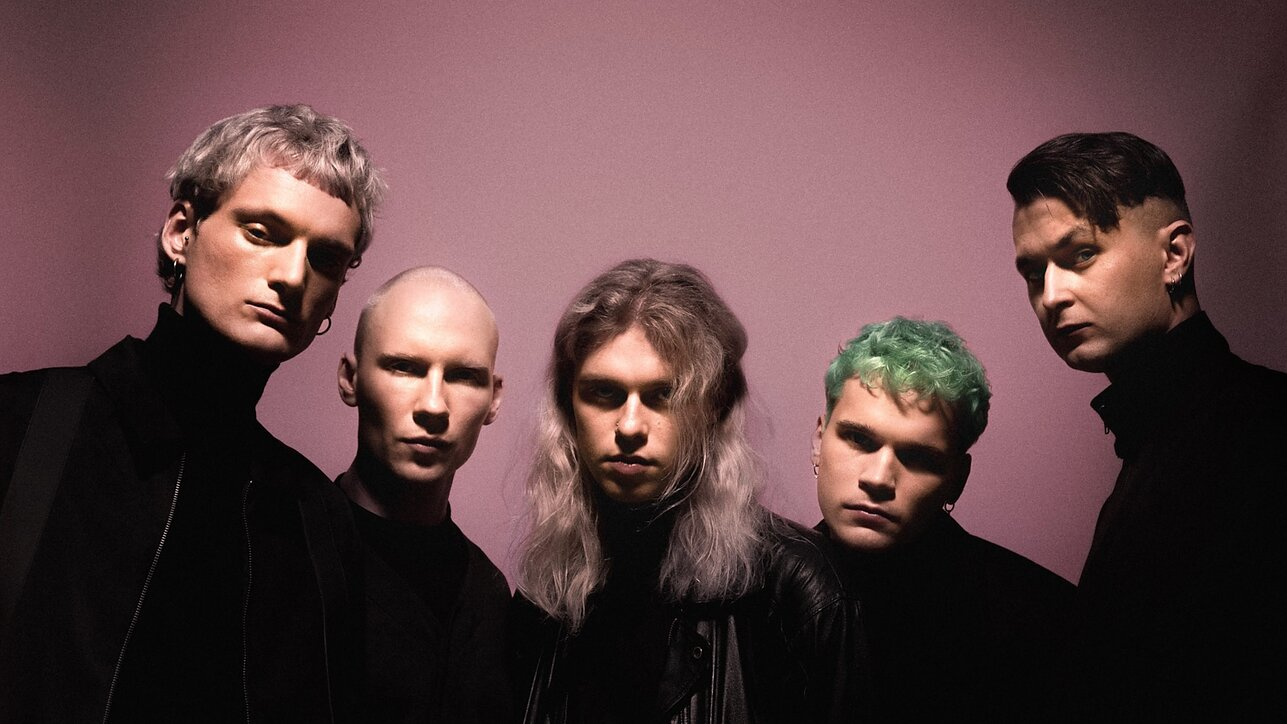
- ba. in 2024. From left to right: Benas Aleksandravičius, Nikita Voitov, Matas Beržinskas, Dominykas Babikas and Simonas Motiejūnas.

Background information
- Origin: Vilnius, Lithuania
- Genres: Indie rock; Alternative rock
- Years active: 2013–present
- Members: Benas Aleksandravičius; Simonas Motiejūnas; Nikita Voitov; Dominykas Babikas; Matas Beržinskas
- Past members: Jonas Butvydas; Jean-Paul Marat

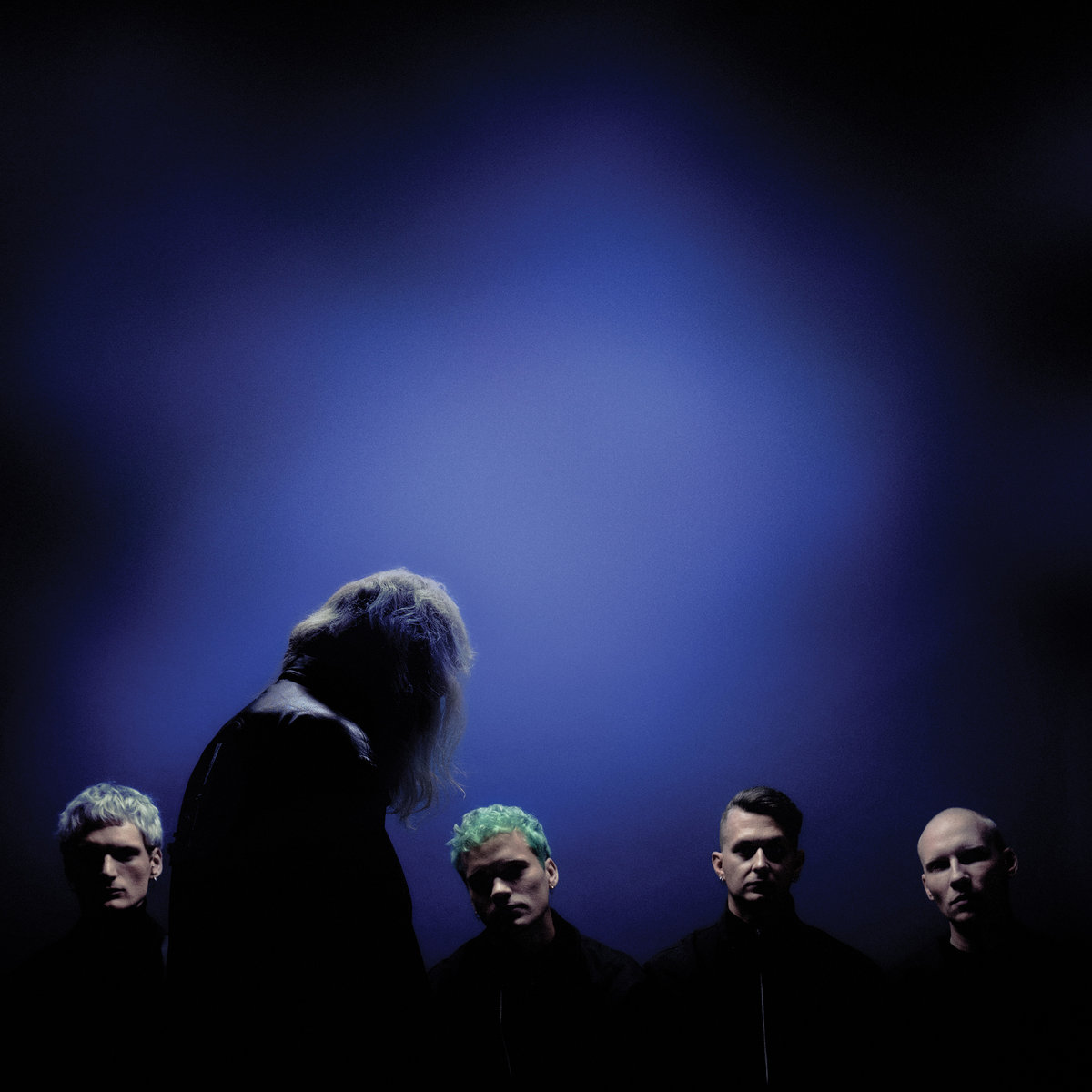
ba. for their album Turtas.

Ba (stylized as ba.) is a Lithuanian rock band formed in Vilnius. The band, originally consisting only of lead singer and guitarist Benas Aleksandravičius and now currently consists of rhythm guitarist Simonas Motiejūnas, bassist Nikita Voitov, guitar, saxophone, keys and synth player Matas Beržinskas and drummer Dominykas Babikas.

== History ==
Founded in Vilnius, Ba made their name with their first studio album Rasti/Pasiklysti, which spent more than half a year in the top 40 of the Lithuanian charts and was certified gold with over 2,500 units certified by AGATA. They achieved greater success with their next album, "H8," which topped the Albums Top 100 and managed to place eight out of ten tracks in the singles chart, including two in the top 40. The album, which spent over 90 weeks on the charts, It was certified platinum for 4,000 copies sold.

=== Early years ===
ba. (initials of Benas Aleksandravičius) began as a solo music project. From childhood Aleksandravičius enjoyed creating sounds and playing electric guitar. He made his first breakthrough at 17 with the song and music video "Tai ne žmogus" (English: "It's not human") in 2013. His music video gained attention and popularity on YouTube.

In 2013 the band released the EP "Raktas" ("key") (5 songs). In 2014 it released EP "Namai" ("Mines") (3 tracks). In 2015 it released the full-length album "Rasti/Pasiklysti". Its most popular songs were "Tai ne žmogus", "Sugebėt pasikeist", "Naktį judu" and "Į mane", garnering views on YouTube and recognition on radio and television.

In 2016, Maratas, a Bosnian, joined ba. as a new bass guitar player. The band released another EP, SAULĖSUŽTĖMIMAS" in 2016 and EP Garsiai Mastau in early 2017.

The same year, the filmmaker group "TWODICKSKLAN" made a video trilogy, Kūną palikai/Atsibudai.

=== Band renovation ===
In 2017, Maratas and Butvydas left the band, replaced by Simonas Motiejūnas (guitar), who had played with ba. occasionally in early years, Nikita Voitov (bass guitar) and Dominykas Babikas (drums). They continued to perform.

=== 2018 ===
In 2018, the book "Chaosas manyje nieko naujo" (Chaos inside me is nothing new) was published, which consisted of photos from backstage at performances and a CD with their most popular songs. The band released a documentary film about the group's musical life.

=== 2019 ===
In 2019 the band released its second full-length album "H8" (10 songs). Three of them would be released as singles. The albums were noticed in ratings, grotto tours.

=== 2020 ===
In 2020, ba. held several acoustic concerts in the grotto of MO Museum, a modern art museum in Vilnius. The band released an LP with 10 songs from the acoustic concerts. Two of the songs were published on Spotify: Iliuzija (Iliusion) and Trenk (Slam).

=== 2022 ===
On June 11, 2022 the band held its 10th anniversary concert in Vingio Park, the group's biggest concert ever. Telia Play released a documentary film of the concert. Their fourth LP, "Nauto" (2022), was also certified platinum by the national member of the International Federation of the Phonographic Industry.

They have won eight awards at the M.A.M.A. awards (Muzikos asociacijos metų apdovanojimai), Lithuania's main music awards, and have received several nominations. For 2025 M.A.M.A. award They were nominated for Group Of the Year, Rock Group of the Year and the Video of the Year (Kiek Dar Vargo).

=== New addition ===
In 2024, guitar, saxophone, keys and synth player Matas Beržinskas joined the band.

== Discography ==
Studio albums
Year	Album details
2015	RASTI / PASIKLYSTI: Released: February 23, 2015; Label: HAPPYENDLESS; Label: GARSO ARCHITEKTŪRA
2019	H8: Released: May 13, 2019; Label: DAMNGOOD
2022	NAUTO: Released: September 30, 2022; Label: SONY MUSIC ENTERTAINMENT FINLAND; Label: DAMNGOOD
2024	TURTAS: Released: December 9, 2024; Label: SONY MUSIC ENTERTAINMENT FINLAND; Label: DAMNGOOD
2026	MIXTAPE VOL. 1: Released: June 14, 2026; Label: DAMNGOOD

EP albums
Year	Album details
2013	raktas: Released: May 10, 2013
2014	namai: Released: April 7, 2014
2016	SAULĖSUŽTEMIMAS: Released: March 7, 2016
2017	GARSIAI MĄSTAU: Released: February 23, 2017
