= Justinas Jarutis =

Lithuanian pop singer

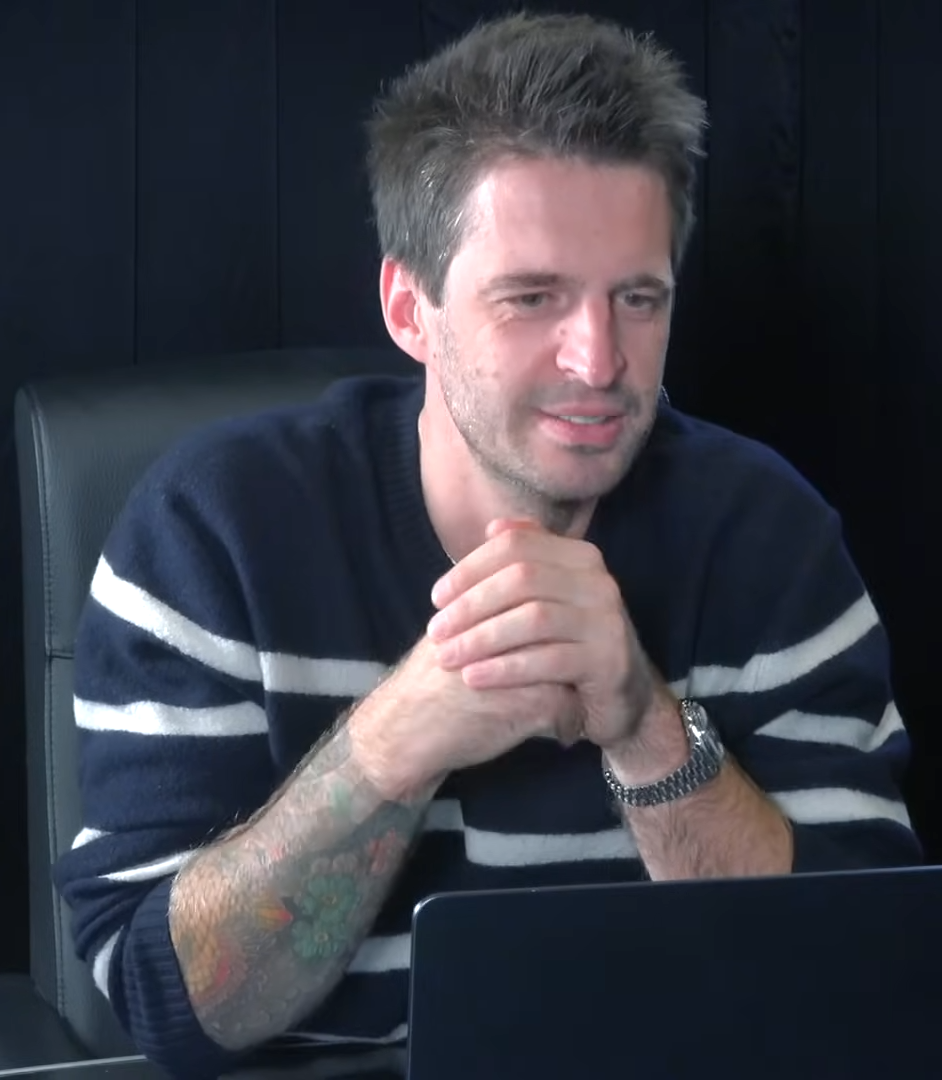
- Justinas Jarutis in December 2024

Background information
- Born: 21 September 1988 (age 37); Kupiškis, Lithuania
- Genres: Pop, Pop-Rock, Soft Rock, Indie Pop
- Occupations: Singer; songwriter
- Years active: 2007–present
- Website: justinasjarutis.lt

Justinas Jarutis (born September 21, 1988, in Kupiškis, Lithuania) is a Lithuanian singer. In 2007, he co-founded the band Freaks on Floor, with which he released five albums, before starting his solo career in 2018. He is also a judge on the television show Lietuvos balsas (The Voice of Lithuania).

== Youth and education ==
Justinas Jarutis was born and raised in Kupiškis, Lithuania. At the age of 17, he moved to Vilnius, where he continued his education in music. He initially studied at the Kupiškis Art School for one year before attending the Yamaha Music School in Vilnius. Later, he enrolled at the Vilnius Juozas Tallat-Kelpša Conservatory to further pursue his musical studies.

== Career ==
=== Freaks on Floor ===
In 2007, Jarutis co-founded the band Freaks on Floor with drummer Rokas Beliukevičius while they were still in high school. The band blends elements of funk, grunge, and hard rock, and describes their music as "alternative party." The lineup includes Justinas Jarutis (vocals, guitar), Rokas Beliukevičius (drums), and Aurelijs Morlencas (bass guitar).

Freaks on Floor has performed over 250 live shows at major Lithuanian festivals and clubs, as well as internationally. The band has released five albums and was recognized as "Rock Group of the Year" at the M.A.M.A. music awards in 2011, 2012, and 2016. They have also received nominations in various categories, including "Album of the Year" and "Group of the Year."

=== Solo career ===
In January 2018, Justinas Jarutis released his eponymous debut album as a solo artist, which featured seven tracks. While his earlier work with Freaks on Floor focused on rock, his solo music shifted toward pop, country, and folk influences. His English-language songs "Stay With Me" (with Moniqué), "Tell Me Your Story" and "Angel" were highly successful.

In autumn 2018, he joined the music television show Lietuvos balsas as a coach. In 2020, he released his Lithuanian-language single "Tavės" which was the first Lithuanian single to top the charts of the M-1 since 2015. It introduced his second album "Tavės Manês Savės", which became one of the three most listened to albums in Lithuania of the year. During the M.A.M.A. awards in 2021, he received the three main awards: "Artist of the Year", "Album of the Year" and "Concert Artist of the Year". That same year, he released the successful duet with Jessica Shy, "Rugpjūtis".

== Personal life ==
Justinas Jarutis is the son of Lithuanian politician Jonas Jarutis. In 2015, he married blogger and model Justina Česnaitė, who created the blog "Ona Būk Plona" in 2016. The couple has one daughter, Adele, born in 2017. They divorced in 2020.

== Discography ==
=== Albums ===
- 2018: Justinas Jarutis
- 2021: Tavęs Manęs Savęs
- 2023: Debesimis Braidyti

=== Singles ===
- 2017: Stay With Me (with Monique)
- 2017: Angel
- 2018: Tell Me Your Story
- 2018: Before You
- 2018: Talk to Me
- 2019: It's My Fault
- 2019: Wildest Dreams
- 2019: Pasakysiu Tau (with Niko Barisas)
- 2019: Anymore
- 2020: She's My Light
- 2020: Baby Blue (with Monique)
- 2020: Tavęs
- 2020: Crazy (with Jovani)
- 2020: Alright (with Jessica Shy)
- 2020: Savęs
- 2021: Rami
- 2021: Tu Palauk (with Jessica Shy)
- 2021: Rugpjūtis (with Jessica Shy)
- 2021: I'm a Fool
- 2021: Visiems Reikia Meilės
- 2022: Grįšiu (with Jautì)
- 2022: Tavo Tavo
- 2022: Ten, Kur Noriu
- 2022: Kvėpuoti Nustosiu
- 2023: Number One
- 2023: Tamsoje
- 2023: Vieną Meilę
- 2023: Atvirkščias Pasaulis (with Džiugas Širvys and Monique)
- 2023: Kalėdos Ištinka
- 2024: Į Dangų
- 2024: Noriu Mylėt (with Kamile Gudmonaite)
