= Modern pagan music =

Music genre

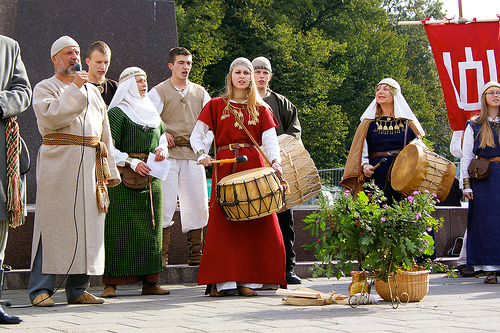
The folk music group Kūlgrinda is the musical expression of Romuva in Lithuania.

Modern pagan music or neopagan music is music created for or influenced by modern Paganism. Music produced in the interwar period include efforts from the Latvian Dievturība movement and the Norwegian composer Geirr Tveitt. The counterculture of the 1960s established British folk revival and world music as influences for American neopagan music. Second-wave feminism created women's music which includes influences from feminist versions of neopaganism. The United States also produced Moondog, a Norse neopagan street musician and composer. The postwar neopagan organisations Ásatrúarfélagið in Iceland and Romuva in Lithuania have been led by musicians.

Several subgenres of rock music have been combined with neopaganism. Neofolk bands have featured pagan revivalists since the genre's inception, pagan rock emerged in the 1980s as a distinct genre or subgenre of gothic rock, and several heavy metal bands have associated themselves with paganism since the early 1990s. Festivals like Wave-Gotik-Treffen and Castlefest have become venues for eclectic neopagan popular music, which may contain elements of gothic rock, neo-Medieval music, folk music, electronic music, ambient music and underground music.

== Interwar period ==
The Latvian neopagan movement Dievturība developed a musical life in the 1930s, focused on the instruments kokles and trīdeksnis, choir music and Latvian folk music. In a 1937 article, the movement's chief ideologue Ernests Brastiņš wrote about the religion's sermons, which included music that "should create solemn and harmonious feelings". This was initially handled by the organist, composer and conductor Valdemārs Ozoliņš (1896–1973). The other main contributors were Jānis Norvilis (1906–1994) and Artūrs Salaks (1891–1984). Norvilis created choral arrangements of folk songs for calendar celebrations. Salaks, a composer and folklorist, became the movement's musical leader in 1936. His own music was characterized by diatonic scale and drones, and combined archaic and new elements in what he dubbed "the Latvian style". In 1938, Salaks released a collection of choral songs titled Latviešu dievestīgās dziesmas ("Latvian songs of adoration").

Also in the 1930s, the Norwegian composer Geirr Tveitt (1908–1981) became affiliated with the Germanic neopaganism of the National Socialist journal Ragnarok and its publisher Hans S. Jacobsen. Jacobsen drew heavily from Jakob Wilhelm Hauer's theories and promoted the adoration of the Norse gods. This influenced Tveitt's musical compositions, notably the ballet Baldurs draumar (1938). Tveitt maintains a high status as a composer in Norway, but his affiliation with this milieu is controversial.

== Counterculture and second-wave feminism ==
A self-identified pagan scene for popular music emerged in the United States in the 1970s. A pioneer was Gwydion Pendderwen (1946–1982), who established an emphasis on folk music and singer-songwriter material. Another early contributor was Charlie Murphy (1953–2016), whose song "Burning Times" became popular in the early 1980s. Their style owed much to the British folk revival of the 1960s, in particular British folk rock acts like Fairport Convention and Steeleye Span. Another important element was the chant, exemplified with Zsuzsanna Budapest's "We all come from the Goddess / And to Her we shall return / Like a drop of rain / Flowing to the ocean". Chants and songs were made integral to the religious rituals of the milieu. World music gradually became a central component, partially due to concerns of inclusion. This expressed itself through drumming circles where Middle Eastern malfuf rhythms became the standard, sometimes alternated with African-based clave rhythms. Pagan recordings and performances began to feature doumbeks, tars and djembes. The mythological material has predominantly been drawn from Celtic mythology. Records from this pagan scene were sold in New Age stores and information about new music was spread through magazines like Circle Network News and Green Egg.

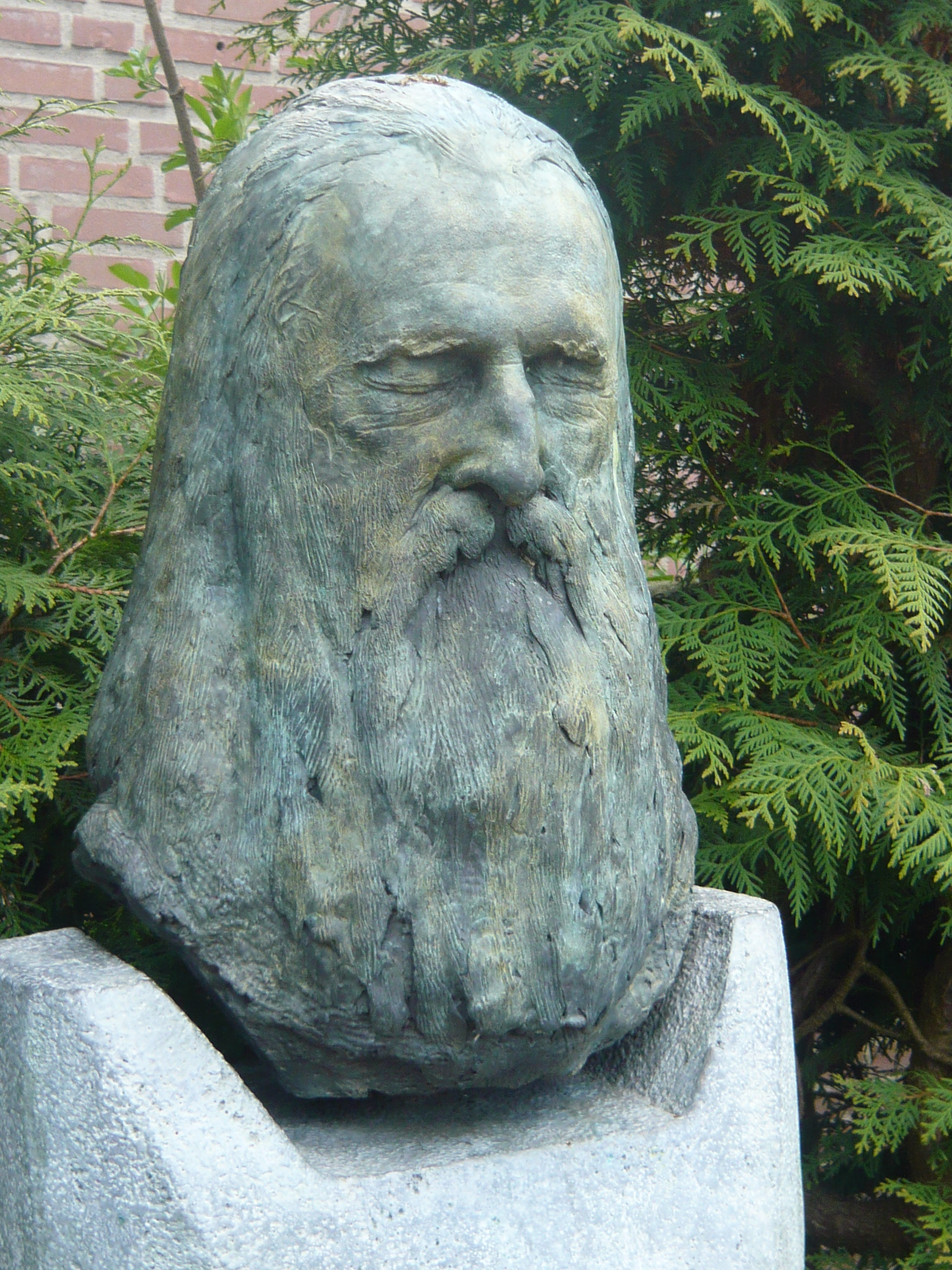
Sculpture of Moondog at his grave in Münster

As a legacy from the counterculture of the 1960s, neopaganism in the United States developed a close relationship with the New Age movement. A prominent example of this is the Starwood Festival, held every summer since 1981. Starwood was formerly held in southwestern New York but has since moved to a site near Athens OH. The festival hosts musical performances, rituals and an eclectic program of workshops.

Kay Gardner (1940–2002) was an adherent of Dianic Wicca and one of the founders of women's music, which emerged as the musical expression of second-wave feminism. Her works include the oratorio Ouroboros: Seasons of Life—Women's Passages. It portrays a woman's life cycle from birth to death using the symbols of the Triple Goddess and neopagan holidays. According to the musicologist Ruth A. Solie, feminist music overall had its origin in the Goddess movement, which inspired women to express their inner lives through music.

Louis Thomas Hardin (1916–1999), known as Moondog, was a blind street musician, composer and poet. He remained outside of organized pagan structures, but included pagan and mythological themes in his music, dressed in a horned helmet, said he believed in the Norse gods and built an altar to Thor at his country retreat in Candor, New York.

== Neopagan movements in post-war Europe ==
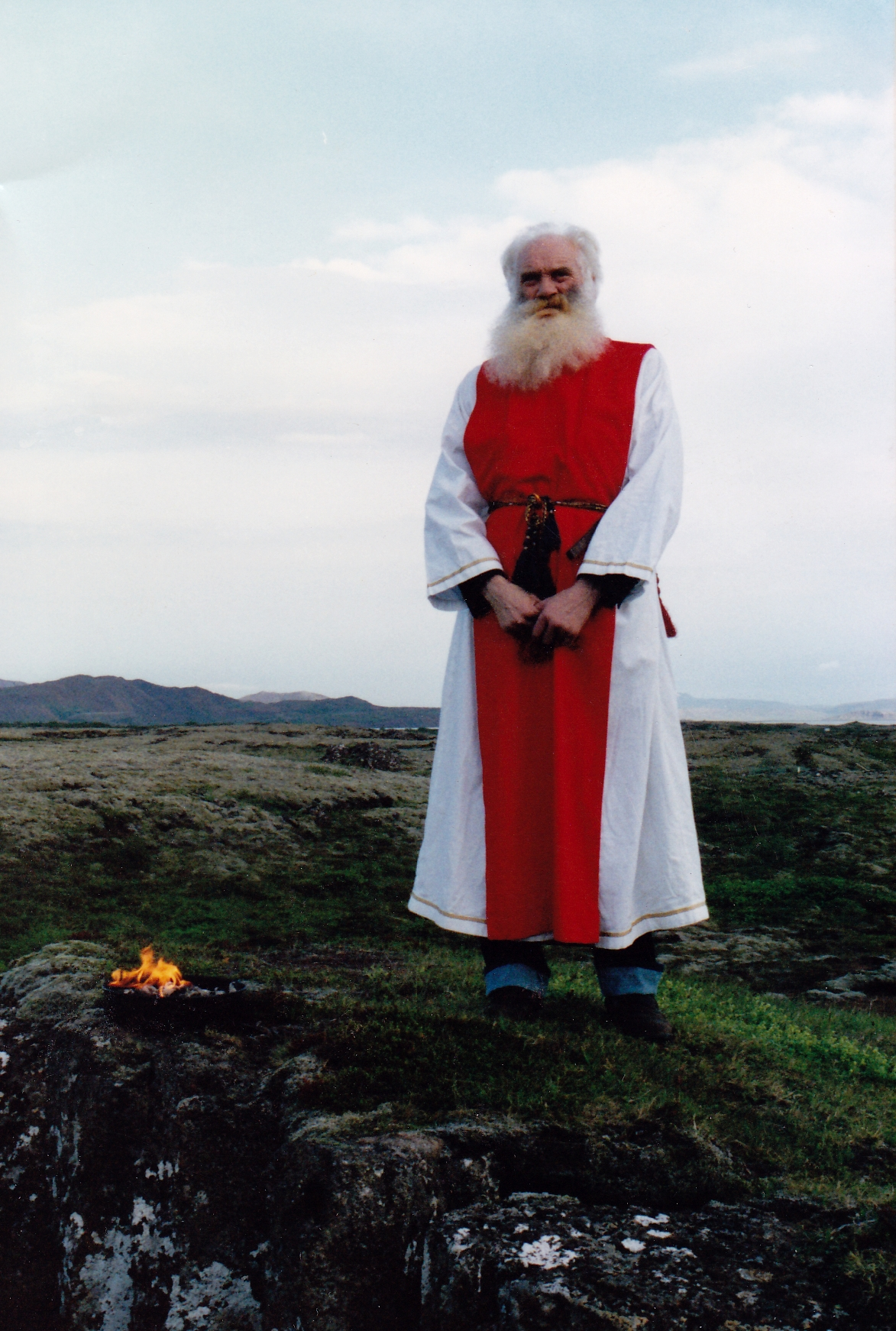
Sveinbjörn Beinteinsson in 1991

In Iceland, Ásatrúarfélagið's first allsherjargoði Sveinbjörn Beinteinsson (1924–1993) was known as both a writer and singer of rímur, a traditional form of alliterative poetry or songs. He can be seen performing in this style in the documentary film Rokk í Reykjavík. In 1982 he released an album, Eddukvæði, where he sings from the Poetic Edda. Another work with ties to Ásatrúarfélagið is Odin's Raven Magic, a 2002 choral and orchestral setting of the Icelandic poem Hrafnagaldr Óðins. It was made by the allsherjargoði Hilmar Örn Hilmarsson (born 1958) in collaboration with Sigur Rós and Steindór Andersen.

The folk music group Kūlgrinda was founded in 1989 by Inija (born 1951) and Jonas Trinkūnas (1939–2014), the leaders of the Lithuanian neopagan movement Romuva. The group functions as the movement's musical expression and is an integral part of its rituals. It is specialised on sutartinės, traditional polyphonic song-chants. Romuva's website describes Kūlgrinda as a "ritual folklore group". The Slovak singer and multi-instrumentalist Miroslav "Žiarislav" Švický (born 1967) has been influential within Slavic Native Faith in Slovakia with his songs that combine Slovak folk music and contemporary influences. He is the founder and leader of the modern pagan organisation Rodný kruh (lit. 'Native Circle').

== Rock music ==
=== Neofolk and the "Euro-pagan scene" ===
The genre of neofolk emerged from industrial music in the 1980s and is musically related to the post-war folk revival and gothic rock. It parallels and partial overlaps folk metal, neoclassical music, neo-Medieval music, folk-pop and pagan metal. The historian of ideas Stéphane François has written that neofolk, also known as apocalyptic folk and dark folk, largely overlaps with what he calls the "Euro-pagan scene", which is "characterized more by a mindset, an overall message, than by a musical genre".

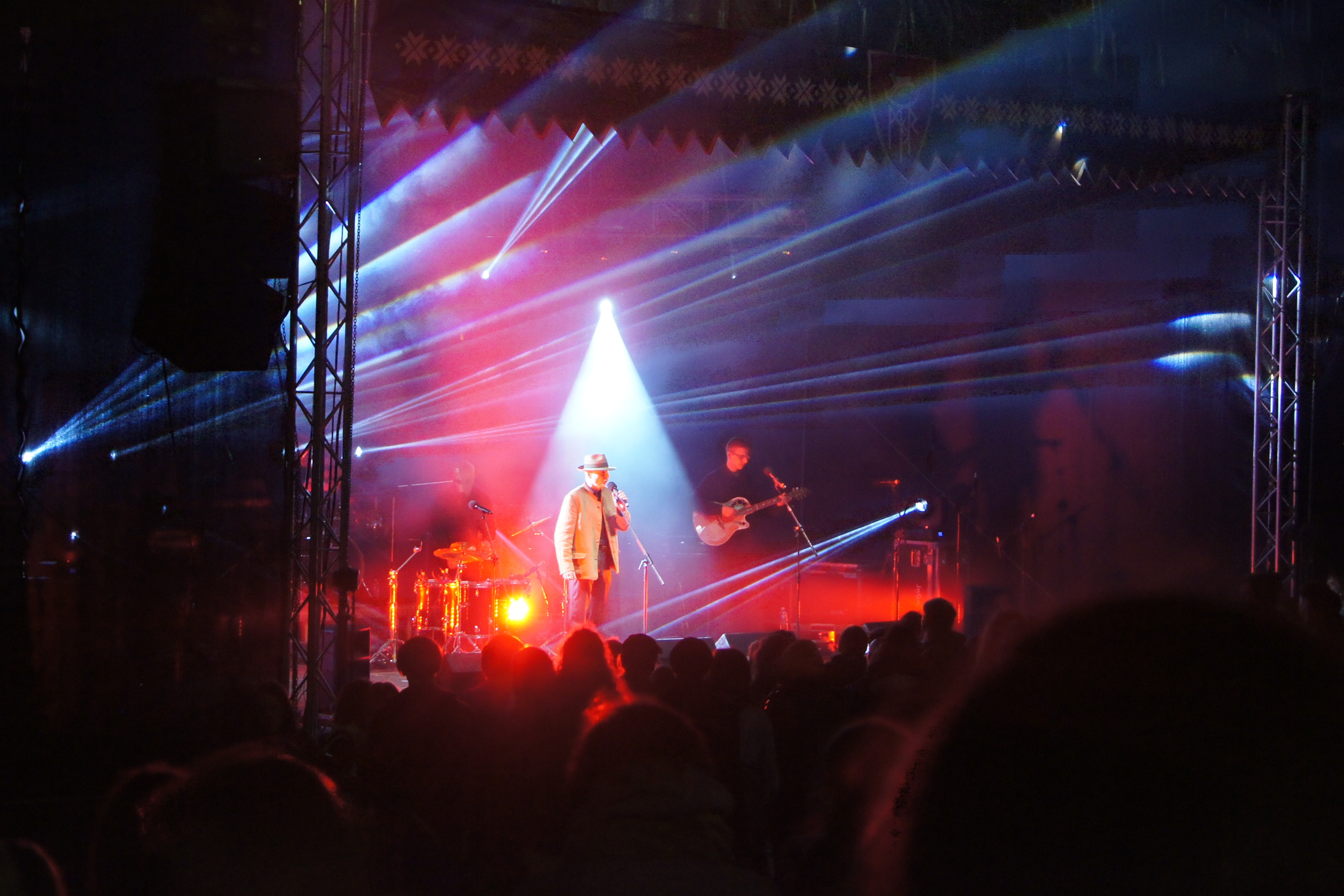
Fire + Ice at Mėnuo Juodaragis in 2013

Pagan revivalism has been a part of the scene from its inception through people such as Robert N. Taylor of the band Changes. Other examples include the band Sol Invictus, Fire + Ice and its frontman Ian Read, the Dutch neopagan Freya Aswynn who has collaborated with groups such as Current 93 and Sixth Comm, and Blood Axis, whose frontman Michael Jenkins Moynihan edits the journal Tyr. Several prominent members have gone from embracing Satanism and witchcraft to embracing paganism, which has led to internal controversies; some participants have combined pagan and Satanic motifs, which others condemn. Since the early 2000s, some people within the scene, such as Barberousse of His Divine Grace and Moynihan, have been influenced by the paganism of the Nouvelle Droite and Alain de Benoist.

Beyond musical commonalities, neofolk is distinguished by an elitist view of culture, opposition to rationalism and modern homogenisation, an interest in Europe, identity and ethnicity, and dark visions. The bands sometimes reference right-wing, occult, neopagan or völkisch subjects with deliberate ambiguity; the scholar Stefanie von Schnurbein calls this an "elitist Nietzschean masquerade" which expresses a "(neo-)romantic art-religious attitude". François associates the themes of the "Euro-pagan scene" with the political right, especially the conservative revolutionary movement, but also sets it apart from right-wing culture through its willingness to engage in avant-garde artistic expressions. François writes that the early and more influential bands are well-informed about their themes, but also describes a strong presence of "diluted esotericism": the conventions and cultural references established by the early groups do not necessarily correspond to a particular worldview among the bands that copy them.

=== Pagan rock ===
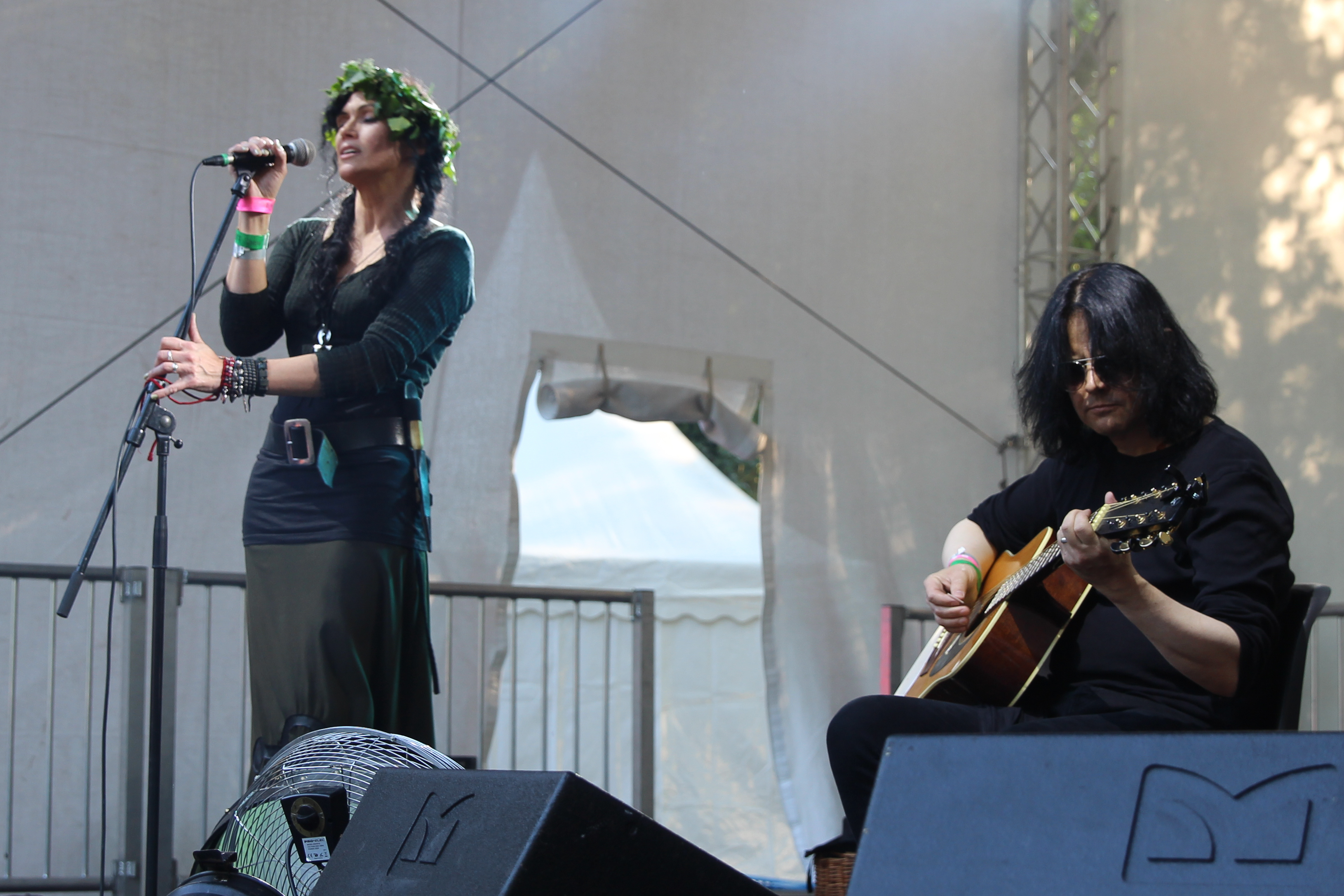
Candia and Tony McKormack of Inkubus Sukkubus at the Wave-Gotik-Treffen in 2014

Pagan rock music as a particular genre emerged from British post-punk, especially gothic rock. According to the writer, journalist and DJ Jason Pitzl-Waters, many younger pagans in the 1980s and 1990s adopted gothic rock as their preferred alternative to the tastes of the baby boom generation, which at the time dominated the neopagan institutions. By the mid 2000s, the genre had fully integrated into the mainstream of those institutions.

Some mythic themes occurred in goth lyrics from the early 1980s, as part of the genre's propensity for the romantic, medieval and primordial. This became more prominent in the "second wave" of the genre, spanning from the mid 1980s to the mid 1990s. One of the most successful bands of this wave, Fields of the Nephilim, make ample references to the occult and paganism in their lyrics. Another band from this wave is Inkubus Sukkubus, formed in 1989 and explicitly referring to itself as a pagan band above everything else. Inkubus Sukkubus had a mainstream breakthrough in the United Kingdom with the release of its debut album in 1993, and would go on to perform at both mainstream venues and neopagan events. The success of Inkubus Sukkubus inspired a number of other British bands to adopt a "Pagan-Goth identity", something that quickly spread to other countries. The Australian-British band Dead Can Dance, formed in 1981, has had a significant impact on neopagan popular music, although neither of its own members has expressed any allegiance to paganism. Dead Can Dance began as a goth band but gradually moved away from the genre and has added elements such as world music and references to mythology. The annual music festival Wave-Gotik-Treffen in Leipzig, which focuses on genres such as gothic rock and dark wave, has a "Pagan Village" for pagan festival goers.

=== Heavy metal ===
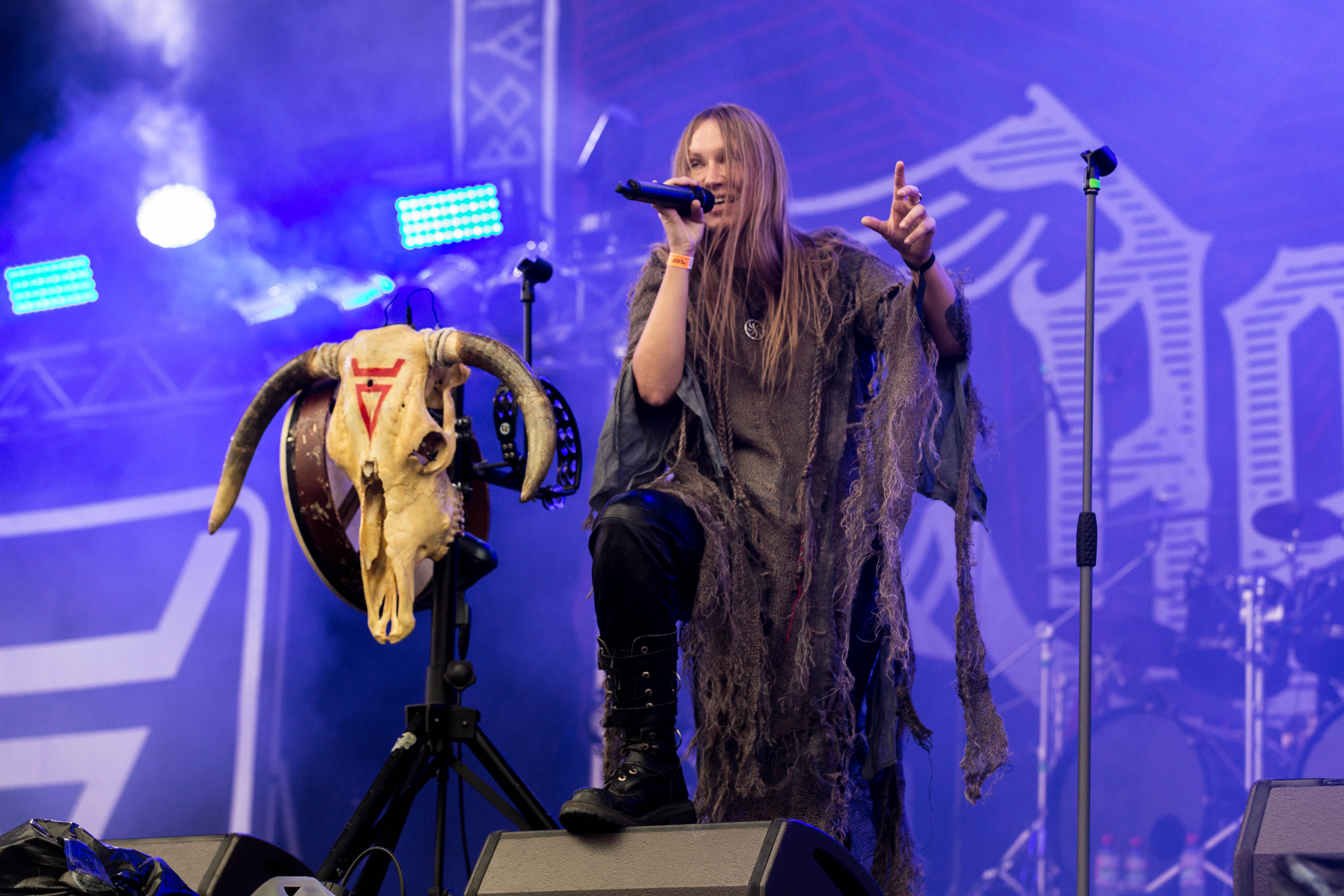
Masha Scream with Arkona at Party.San Metal Open Air in 2019

Heavy metal music inherited an interest in Satanism and the occult from its progenitors in 1960s rock music. Beginning in Scandinavia around 1990, many metal bands came to replace the Satanic theme with an interest in paganism. Few of these musicians regarded themselves as religious, but the black metal scene in particular developed an affinity for paganism and folk customs. An example is a 1995 essay by the Austrian musician Gerhard "Kadmon" Petak, which quotes from Otto Höfler to draw parallels between black metal and traditions surrounding the Wild Hunt motif. The essay first became influential in the Alpine black metal scene, and received wider distribution when an English translation was included in the 1998 book Lords of Chaos.

Among metal bands that explicitly profess to paganism are Arkona from Russia, Falkenbach from Germany and Skálmöld from Iceland. Individual musicians include Gaahl, involved in metal bands like Gorgoroth, Trelldom and God Seed, Ossian D'Ambrosio, founder and guitar player of Opera IX, and Pierre Wilhelmsson, former bass guitar player and lyrics writer for Månegarm.

== Eclecticism: ethno-gothic, pagan folk and ambient ==
A wider popular music scene has formed in Europe around festivals like the Wave-Gotik-Treffen in Germany and Castlefest in the Netherlands. The formula of bands like Dead Can Dance has spawned what Pitz-Waters has labeled "ethno-Gothic", represented by bands like Ataraxia from Italy, Rhea's Obsession from Canada and the Australian musician Louisa John-Krol. Other openly pagan or occult-oriented bands with a clear debt to Dead Can Dance include Seventh Harmonic, Atrium Animae, Daemonia Nymphe, Trobar de Morte and Íon.

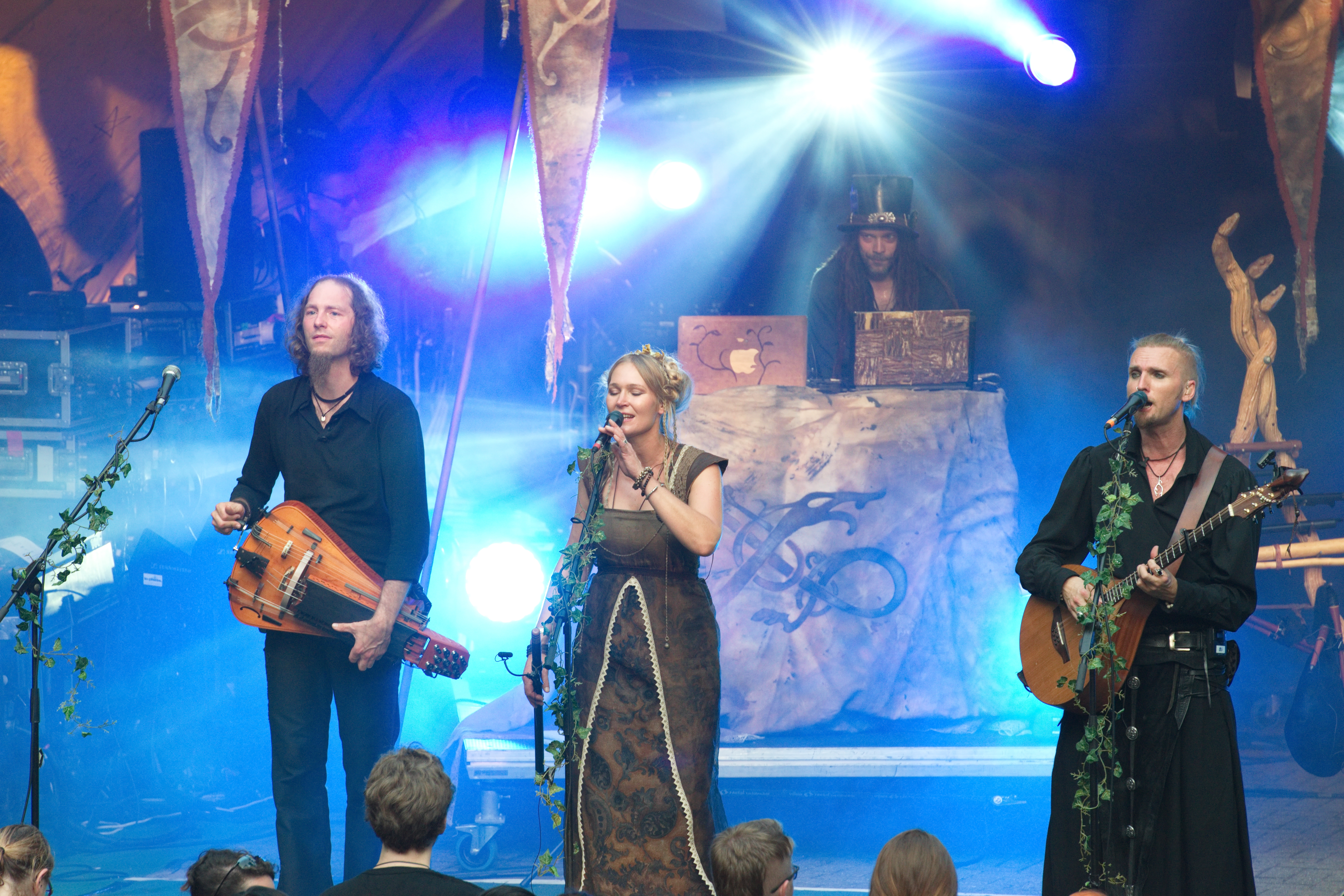
Faun at the Feuertal Festival in Wuppertal in 2016

The German band Faun formed in 1999 and had their first mainstream success in Germany in 2013. They emerged from the neo-Medieval music scene but developed an eclectic style, which involves folk music and electronic music. They dubbed this pagan folk, a term that has been picked up by other bands such as Omnia from the Netherlands. Typical for the pagan folk genre are premodern instruments, medievalist costumes and imagery, as well as modern elements in order to create an idealised vision of an archaic past that is present in the contemporary world.

The German Andrea Haugen's projects Aghast, Hagalaz' Runedance and Nebelhexë express a Germanic paganism focused on the cycles of nature and feminine mysteries. Haugen's musical influences include the English neofolk of Sol Invictus and Fire + Ice, the dark wave of Dead Can Dance, and Scandinavian folk music acts like Hedningarna and Mari Boine. The musicians of the Norwegian group Wardruna have a background in the metal genre, and have subsequently influenced some metal bands. Wardruna have created ambient music based on the runes and their meaning. They aim to use "the oldest of Nordic instruments"; this has included harp, frame drum, mouth harp and goat horn, and the natural sounds of trees, rocks and water.

== Art music ==
Some composers of art music draw on Pagan themes. Die erste Walpurgisnacht, set to music by Felix Mendelssohn, tells of Druid rituals in the Harz mountains. Merry Mount by Howard Hanson celebrates early colonial American Neo-Paganism. Iannis Xenakis composed Persephassa in honor of the goddess Persephone. Most of the works of Bronius Kutavičius are inspired by ancient Lithuanian polytheistic belief and music.

== See also ==
- Ancient music
- Beltania
- Kilkim Žaibu
- New-age music
- Occulture
