= Religion in Slovakia =

Religion in Slovakia (2021)
1. Roman Catholicism (55.8%)
2. Greek Catholicism (4.00%)
3. Protestantism and other Christians (9.00%)
4. Other religions (1.20%)
5. No religion (23.8%)
6. Undeclared (6.50%)

Religion in Slovakia is predominantly Christianity, adhered to by about 68.8% of the population in 2021.

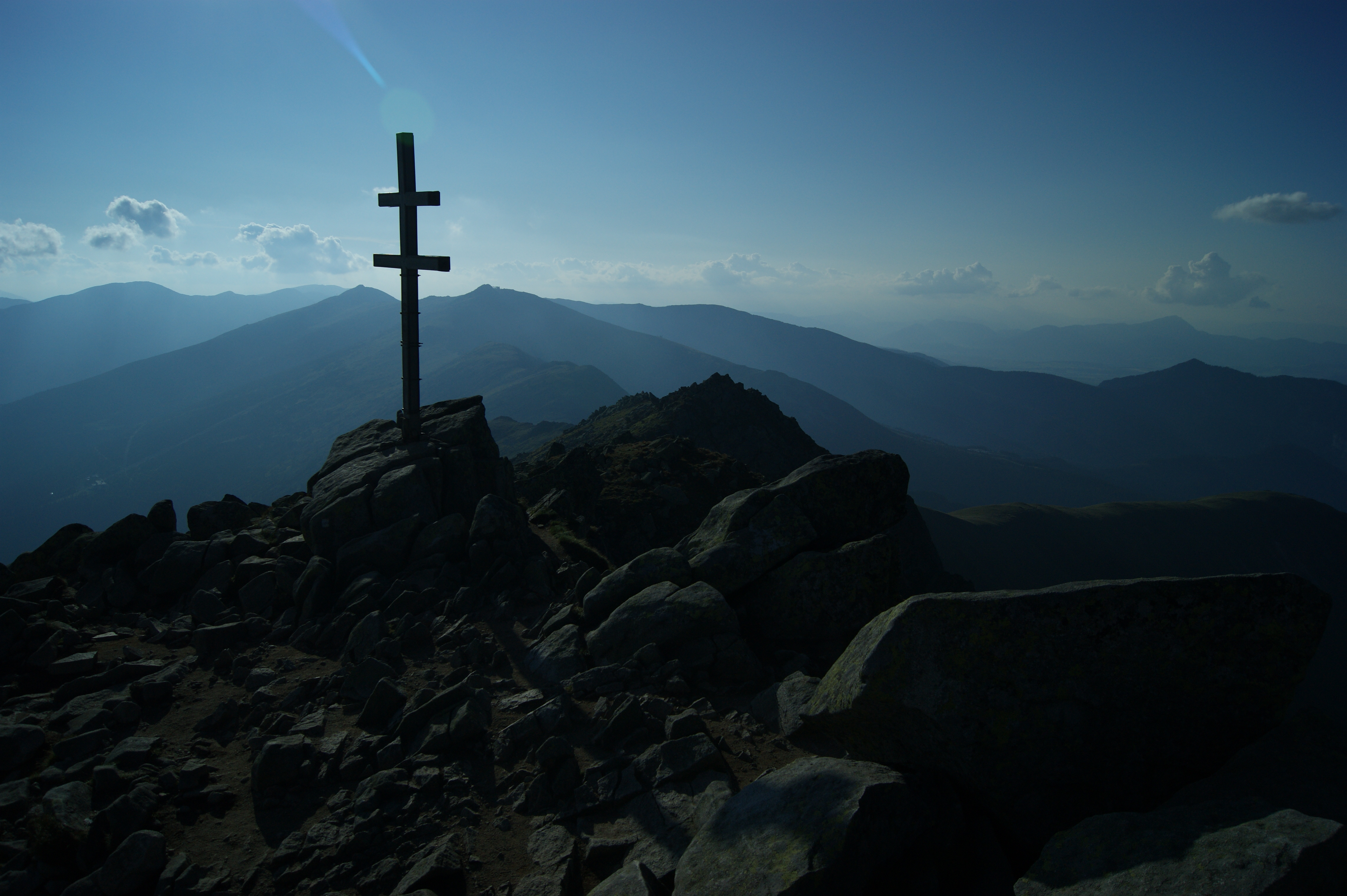
Christian symbol of Slovakia–Patriarchal cross at the top of Ďumbier, highest mountain in the Low Tatras.

The Catholic Church is the major Christian tradition in the country, followed in 2021 by 59.8% of the population, a majority of whom (55.8%) were of the Latin Church and a minority of whom (4%) were of the Slovak Greek Catholic Church. About 9% of the population were mostly followers of Protestantism, and a minority of Eastern Orthodox Church and other Christian denominations; the major groupings are the Evangelical Church of the Augsburg Confession in Slovakia (5.3%), the Reformed Christian Church in Slovakia (1.6%), the Orthodox Church of the Czech Lands and Slovakia (0.9%), the Jehovah's Witnesses (0.3%), and other smaller Christian denominations (0.9%). In 2021, about 23.8% of the population declared themselves not religious, an increase from 13.4% in 2011. An additional 1.2% of the population were followers of other religions or beliefs; small religious minorities in Slovakia include Buddhism, modern Paganism, Islam, Judaism, Jediism, Hinduism

== Demographics ==
=== Census statistics, 1900–2021 ===
Religious affiliations in Slovakia, census 1900–2021
Religion	1900		1910		1921		1930		1950		1991		2001		2011		2021	
Religion	Number	%	Number	%	Number	%	Number	%	Number	%	Number	%	Number	%	Number	%	Number	%
Christianity	2,640,996	94.9	2,776,658	95.2	2,847,160	95.1	3,164,448	95.2	3,414,440	99.2	3,833,943	72.8	4,513,025	83.8	4,073,833	75.5	3,747,558	68.8
—Catholicism	2,098,326	75.4	2,225,410	76.3	2,317,247	77.4	2,592,720	78.0	2,848,693	82.8	3,366,116	63.8	3,927,951	73.0	3,554,148	65.9	3,256,746	59.8
——Latin Church	1,900,738	68.3	2,027,077	69.5	2,122,646	70.9	2,379,984	71.6	2,623,198	76.2	3,187,383	60.4	3,708,120	68.9	3,347,277	62.0	3,038,511	55.8
——Slovak Greek Catholic Church	197,588	7.1	198,333	6.8	194,601	6.5	212,736	6.4	225,495	6.6	178,733	3.4	219,831	4.1	206,871	3.8	218,235	4.0
—Evangelical Church of the Augsburg Confession in Slovakia	392,392	14.1	393,749	13.5	383,214	12.8	398,880	12.0	443,251	12.9	326,397	6.2	372,858	6.9	316,250	5.9	286,907	5.3
—Reformed Christian Church in Slovakia	150,278	5.4	157,499	5.4	143,705	4.8	146,256	4.4	111,696	3.2	82,545	1.6	109,735	2.0	98,797	1.8	85,271	1.6
—Orthodox Church of the Czech Lands and Slovakia	–	–	–	–	2,994	0.1	9,972	0.3	7,975	0.2	34,376	0.7	50,363	0.9	49,133	0.9	50,677	0.9
—Jehovah's Witnesses	–	–	–	–	–	–	–	–	–	–	10,501	0.2	20,630	0.4	17,222	0.3	16,416	0.3
—Other Christians	–	–	–	–	–	–	16,620	0.5	2,825	0.1	14,008	0.3	31,488	0.6	38,283	0.7	51,541	0.9
Buddhism	–	–	–	–	–	–	–	–	–	–	–	–	–	–	2,530	0.05	6,722	0.1
Paganism	–	–	–	–	–	–	–	–	–	–	–	–	–	–	–	–	4,007	0.1
Islam	–	–	–	–	–	–	–	–	–	–	–	–	–	–	1,934	0.04	3,862	0.07
Judaism	141,929	5.1	140,000	4.8	134,724	4.5	136,284	4.1	7,476	0.2	912	0.02	2,310	0.04	1,999	0.04	2,007	0.04
Jediism	–	–	–	–	–	–	–	–	–	–	–	–	–	–	–	–	1,389	0.03
Hinduism	–	–	–	–	–	–	–	–	–	–	–	–	–	–	255	0.01	975	0.02
Pastafarianism	–	–	–	–	–	–	–	–	–	–	–	–	–	–	–	–	590	0.01
Other religion	–	–	–	–	–	–	–	–	10,722	0.3	6,094	0.1	6,214	0.1	19,686	0.4	32,171	0.6
No religion	–	–	–	–	11,975	0.4	16,620	0.5	9,679	0.3	515,551	9.8	697,308	13.0	725,362	13.4	1,296,142	23.8
Not stated	–	–	–	–	–	–	6,648	0.2	–	–	917,835	17.3	160,598	3.0	571,437	10.6	353,797	6.5
Total population	2,782,925		2,916,657		2,993,859		3,324,000		3,442,317		5,274,335		5,379,455		5,397,036		5,449,270	

Geographic distribution of religions in Slovakia

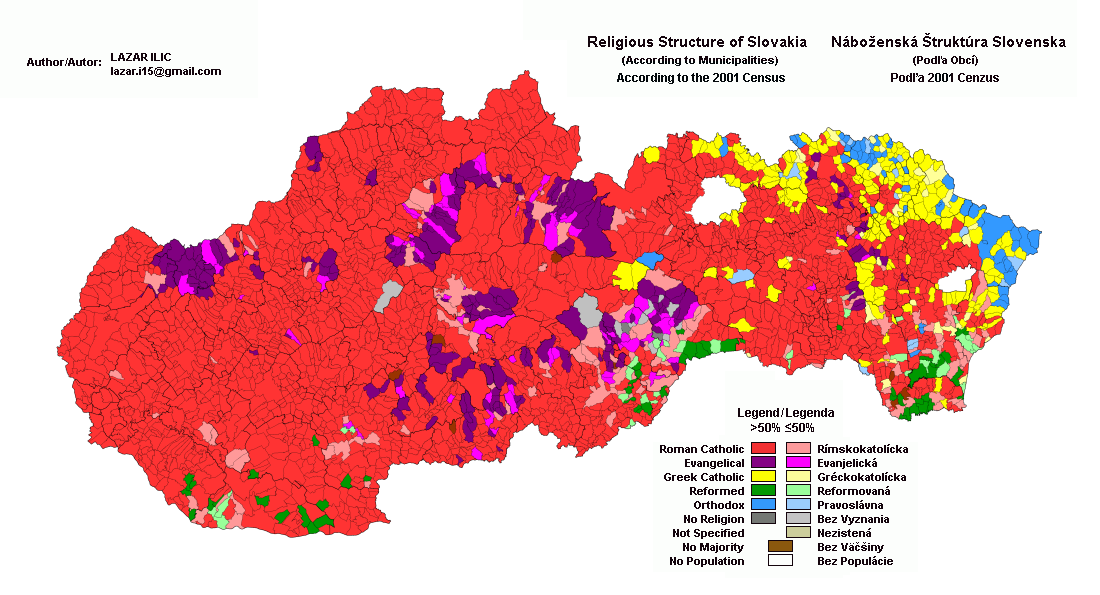
2001 census

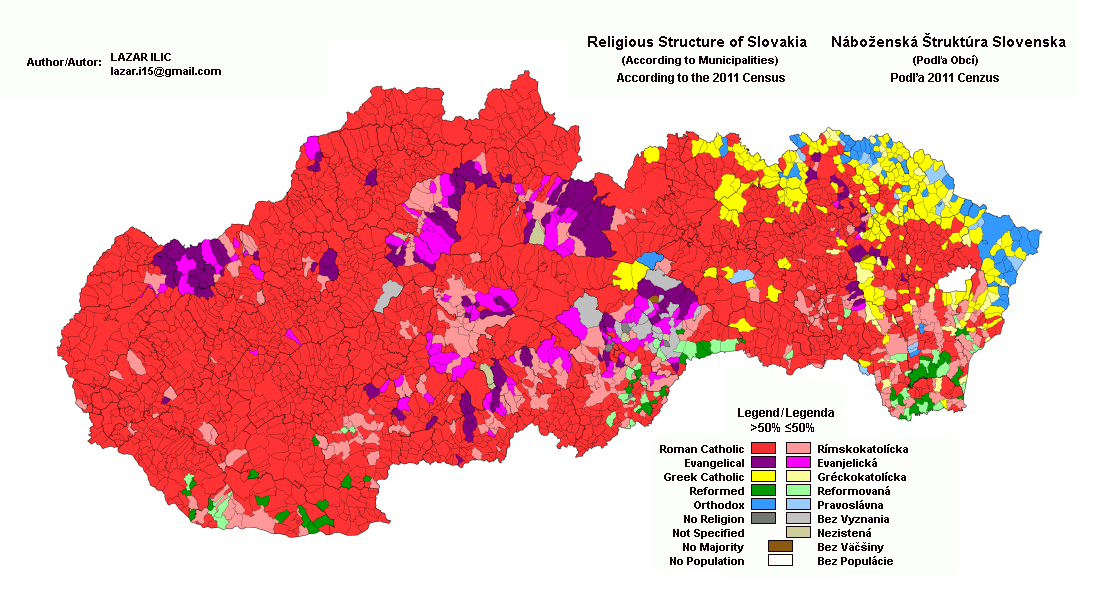
2011 census

=== Line chart of the trends, 1900–2021 ===
Census statistics 1900 - 2021:

View source data.
Catholicism
Protestantism and other Christians
Judaism
Other religion
No religion
Not stated

== Christianity ==
According to the 2021 census, Christianity was the religion of 68.8% of the population of Slovakia, of whom 59.8% were Catholics (55.8% adherents of the Roman Catholics and 4% of the Slovak Greek Catholic Church), 5.3% were adherents of the Evangelical Church of the Augsburg Confession in Slovakia, 1.6% of the Reformed Christian Church in Slovakia, 0.9% of the Czech and Slovak Orthodox Church, 0.3% were Jehovah's Witnesses, and another 0.9% were followers of other Christian denominations. In Slovakia there are also small numbers of adherents of various other Christian denominations, including Adventism, Apostolic Pentecostalism, Baptists, Brethren, Hussitism, Irvingism (New Apostolicism), Methodism and Old Catholicism.

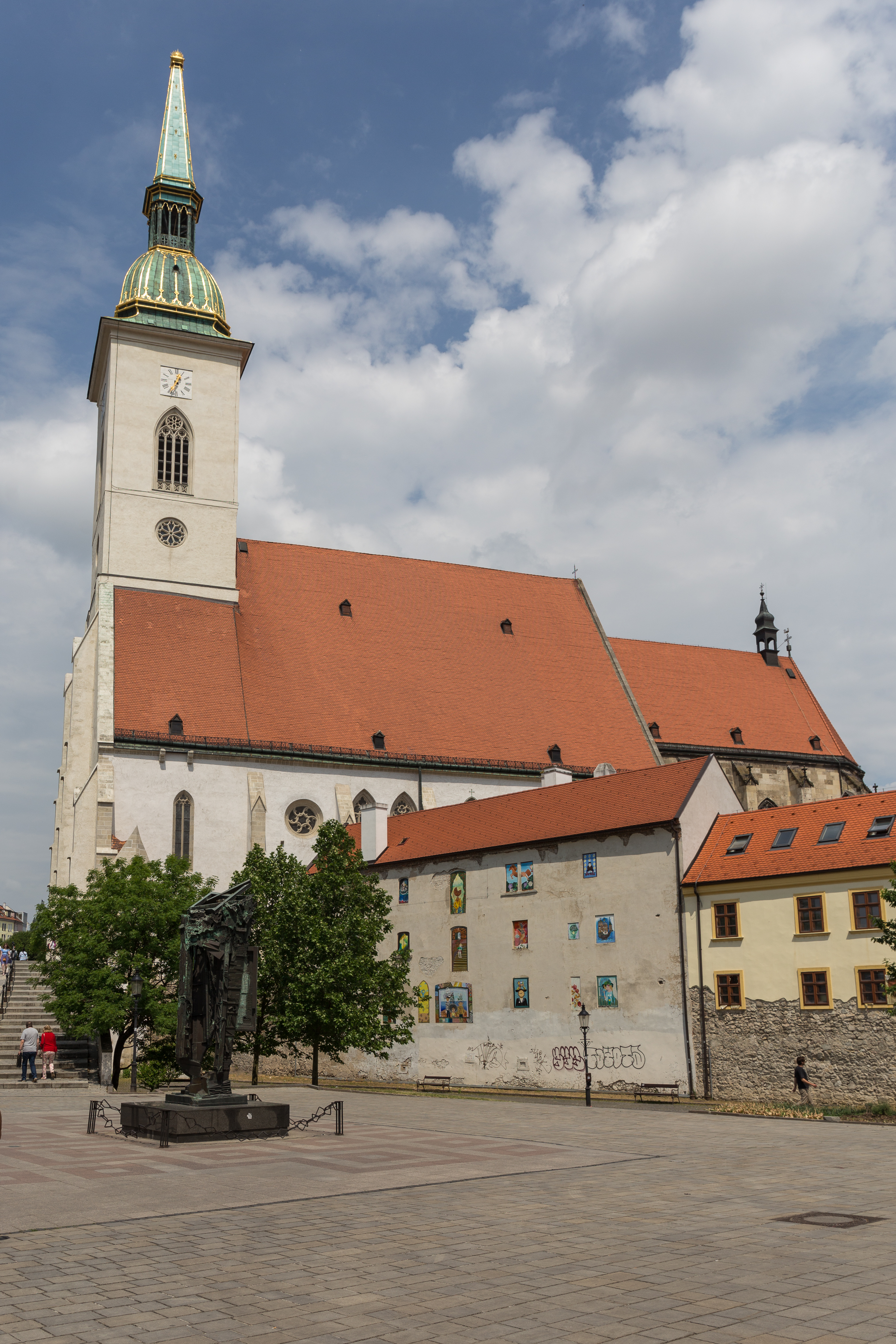
Roman Catholic Cathedral of Saint Martin in Bratislava.

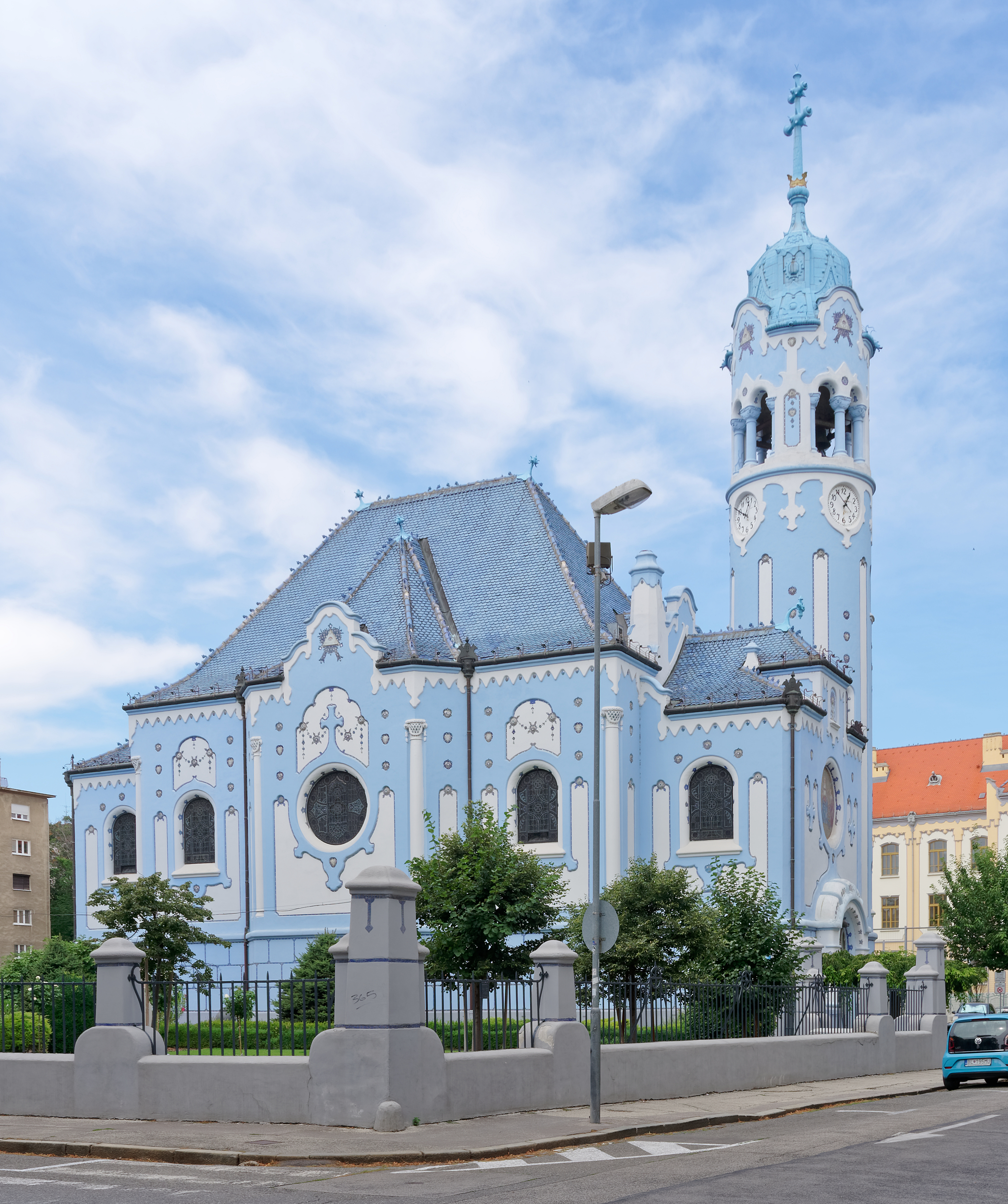
The iconic Roman Catholic Church of Saint Elizabeth, commonly known as Blue Church, in Bratislava.

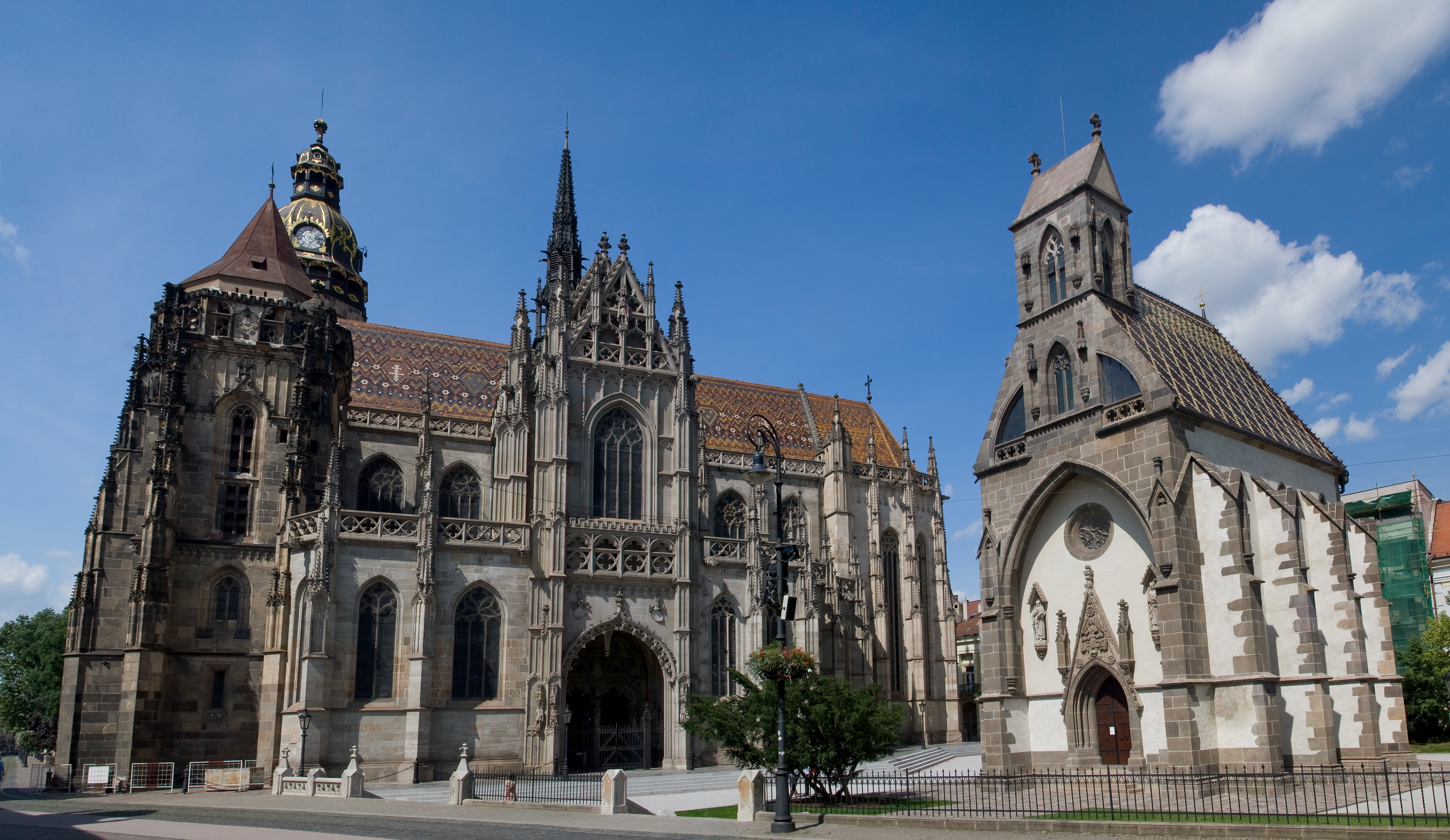
St. Elisabeth's Cathedral in Košice, the largest church in Slovakia.

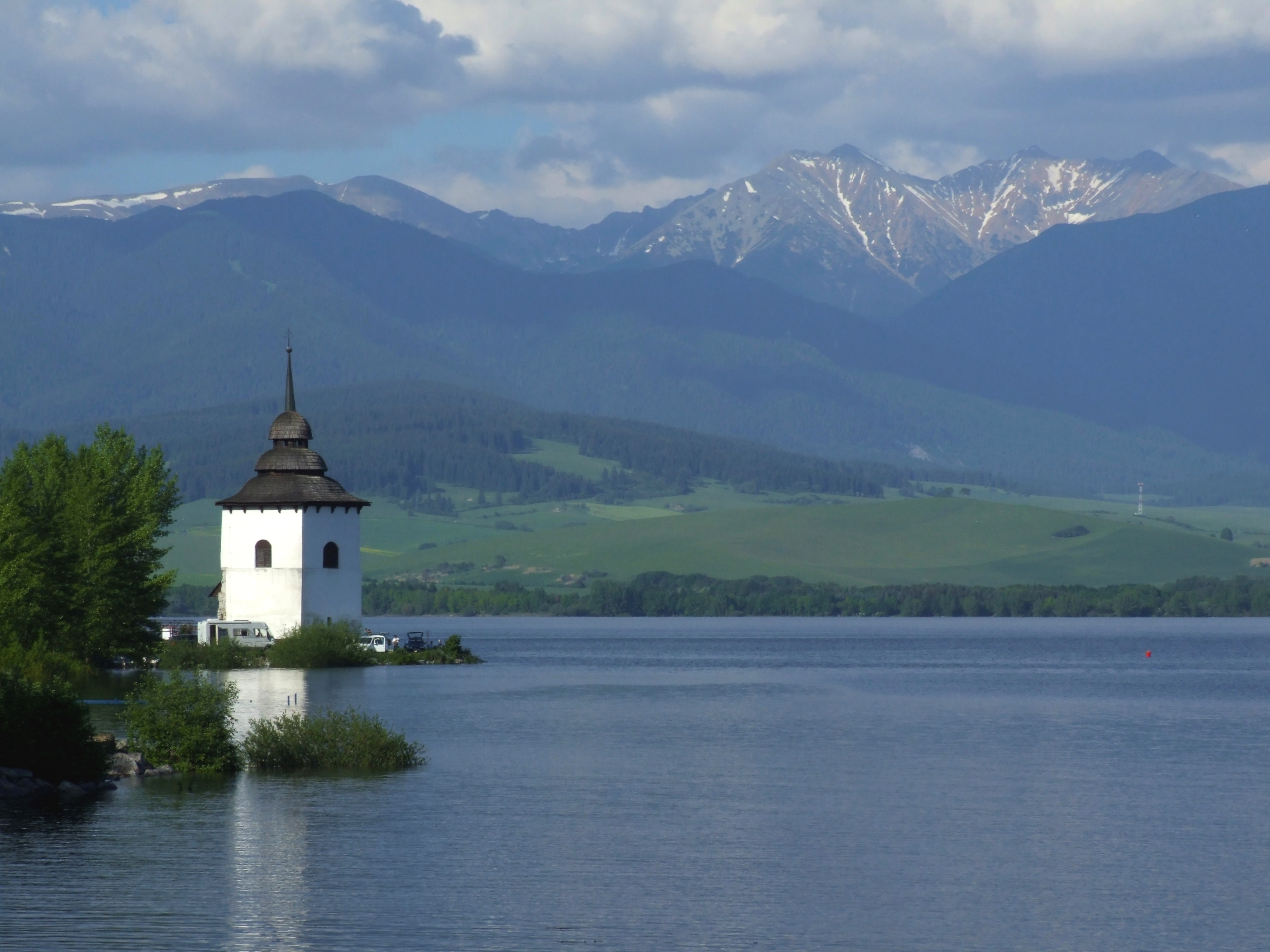
Church tower at Liptovská Mara.

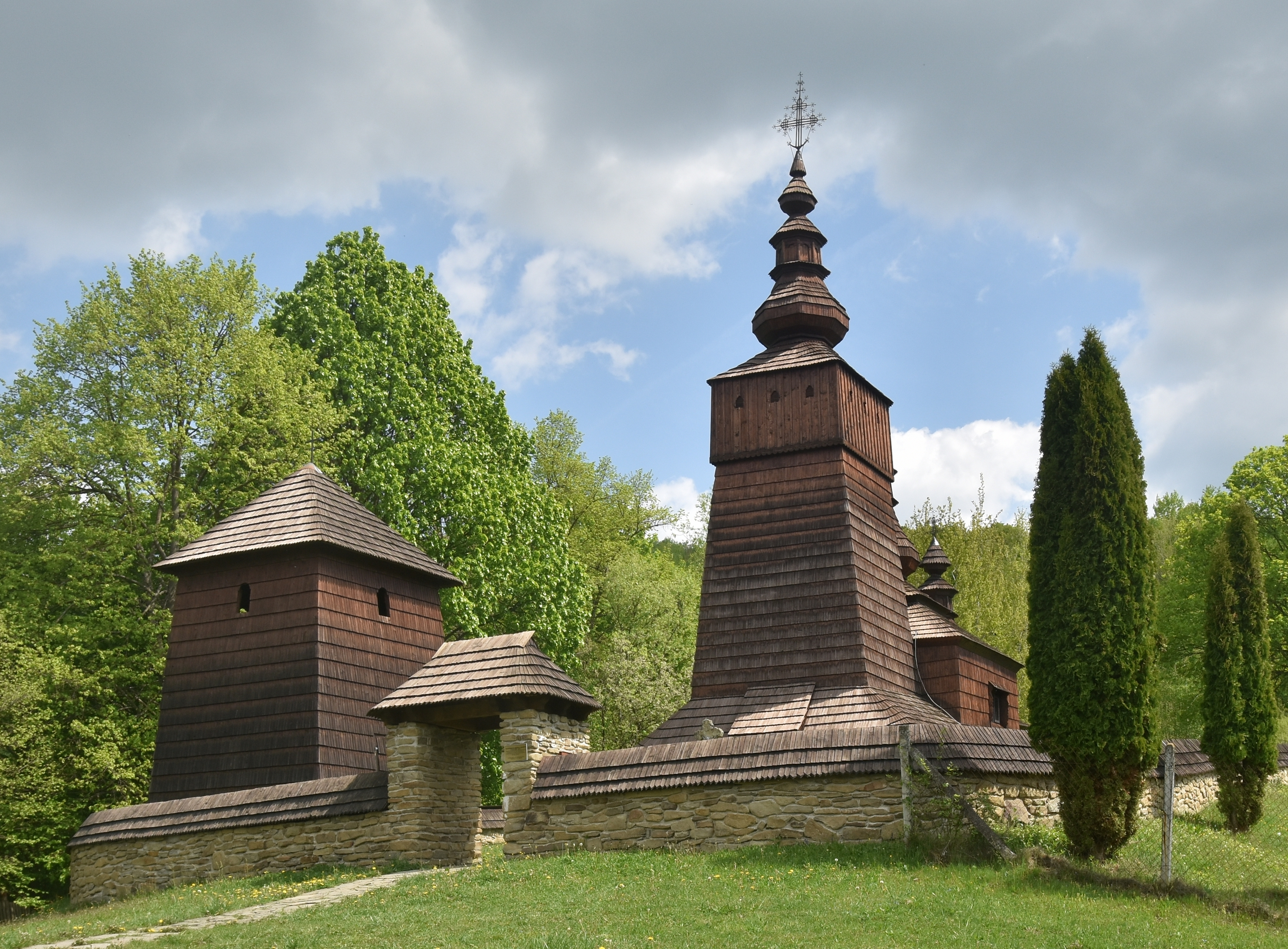
Greek Catholic wooden Church of Saint Paraskeva in Potoky, Prešov Region.

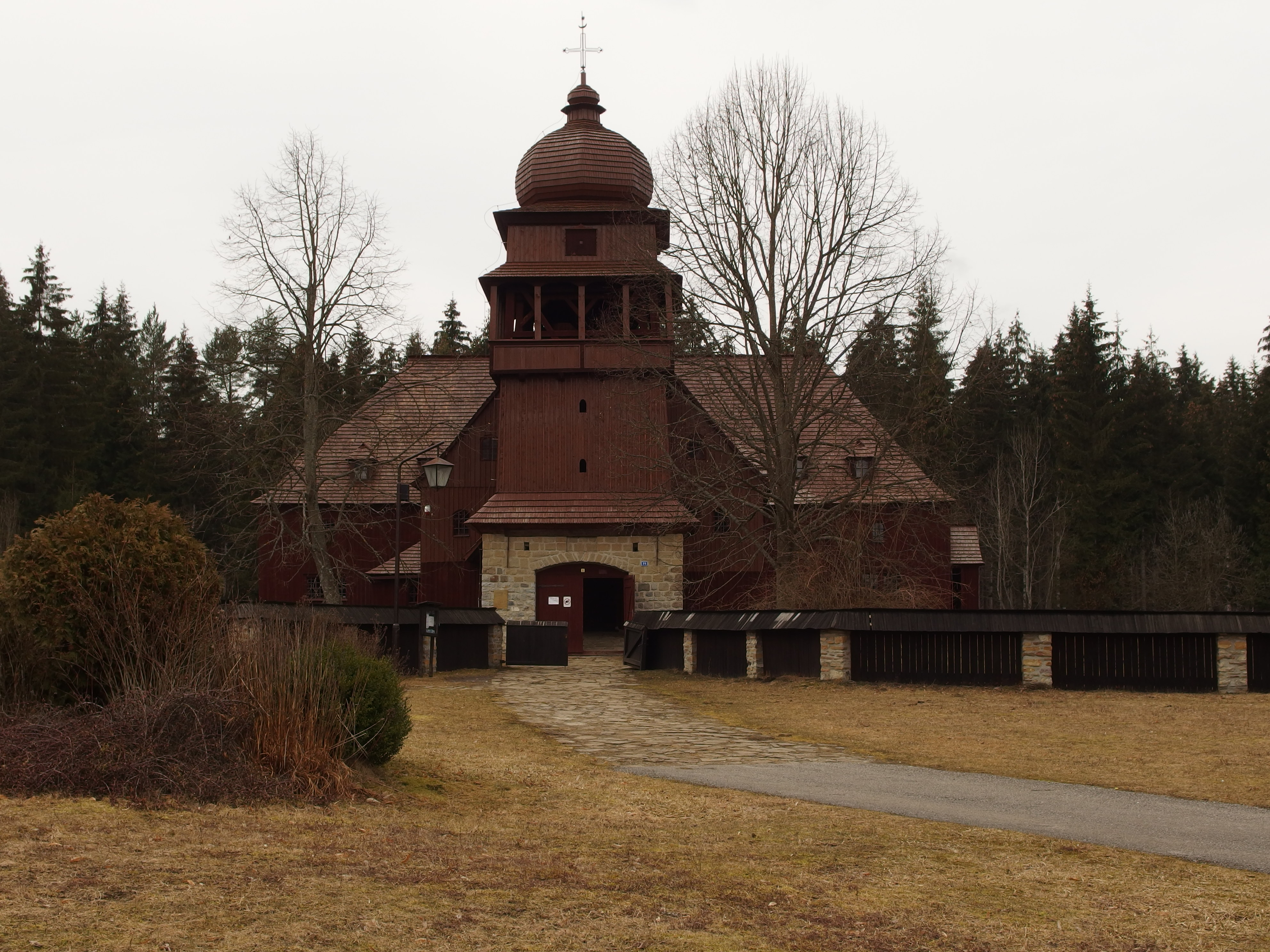
Evangelical Lutheran wooden church of Svätý Kríž, Žilina Region.

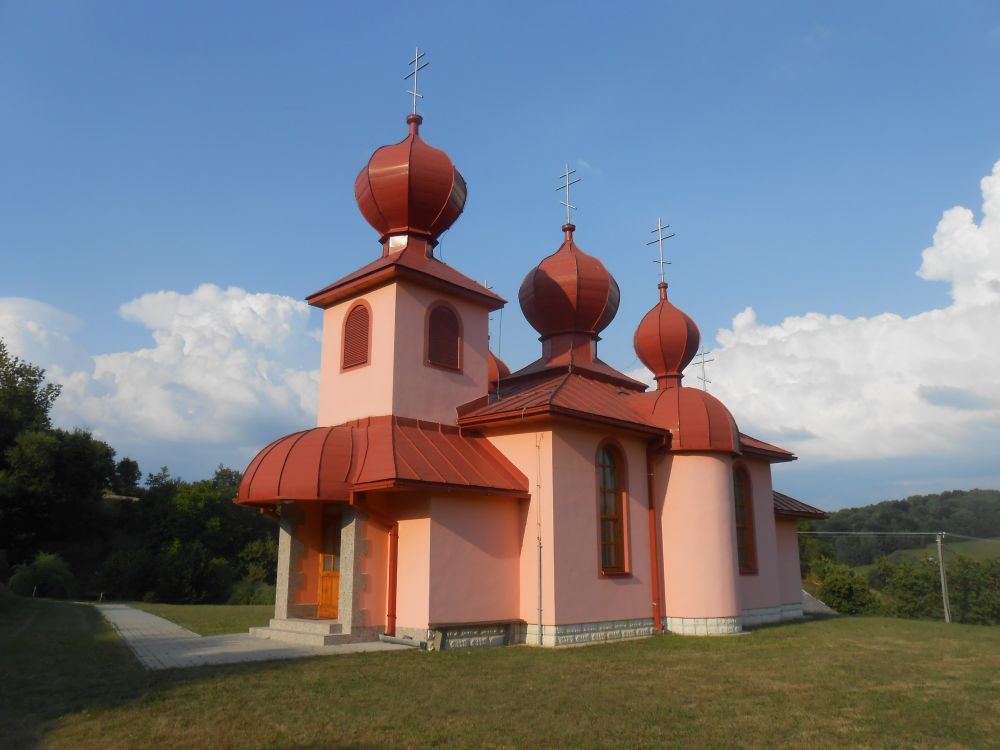
Orthodox Christian church in Hrabová Roztoka, Prešov Region.

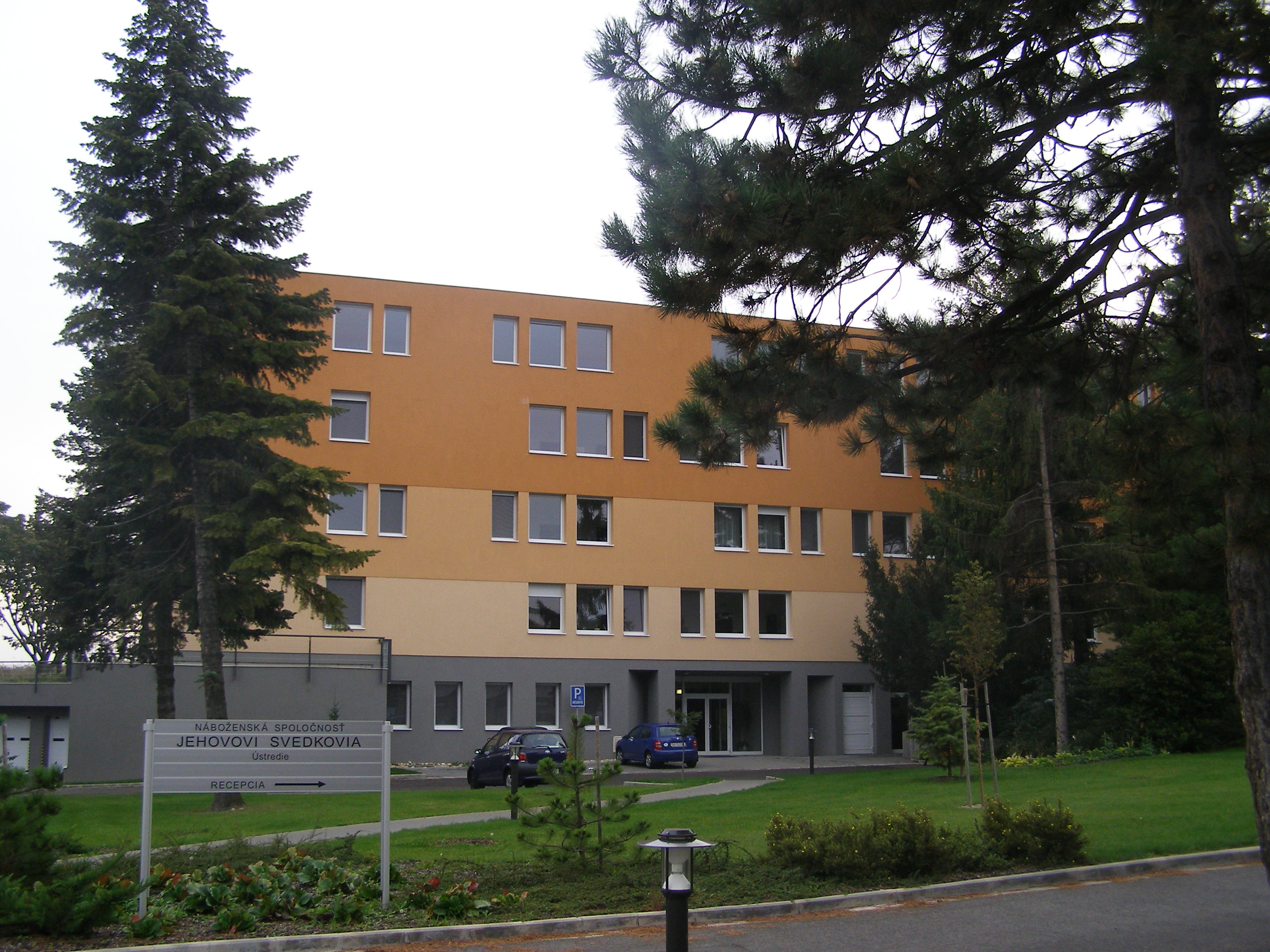
Kingdom hall of the Jehovah's Witnesses in Bratislava.

== Other religions ==
Minority religions in Slovakia, according to the 2021 census, included 6,722 adherents of Buddhism (0.1% of the population), 3,862 adherents of Islam (0.1%), 2,007 adherents of Judaism (<0.1%), 1,389 adherents of Jediism (<0.1%), and even smaller minorities of people professing Hindusim, Pastafarianism, the Baháʼí Faith and other religions. There are organisations of practitioners of Slavic Rodnovery in Slovakia, part of the 0.1% of the population (4,007 people) who in the 2021 census identified themselves as Pagans. Rodnover organisations in the country include the Native Circle (Rodný Kruh), whose leader, Miroslav "Žiarislav" Švitsky, initiated in 2001 one of the most influential leaders of Czech Rodnovery, Richard Bigl. Other groups are the Holy Grove of Native Faith (Svätoháj Rodnej Viery), and the Civic Association Tartaria (Občianske združenie Tartaria), which caters to followers of the Rodnover doctrine of Ynglism. Another Pagan religion present in the country is Mesopotamian Zuism; some members of the Slovak Zuist community were also involved in the development of the Icelandic church of the movement.

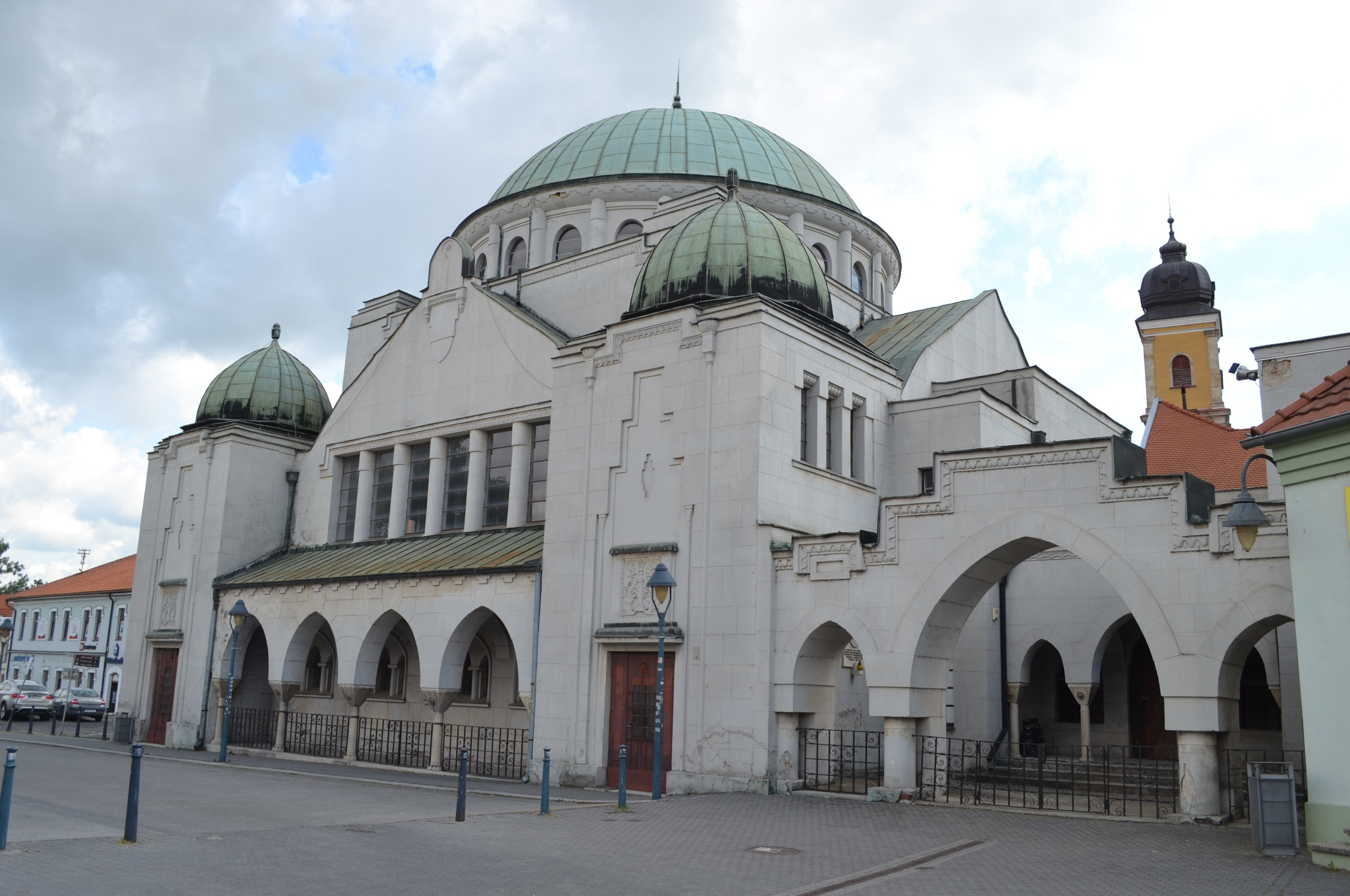
Jewish synagogue of Trenčín.

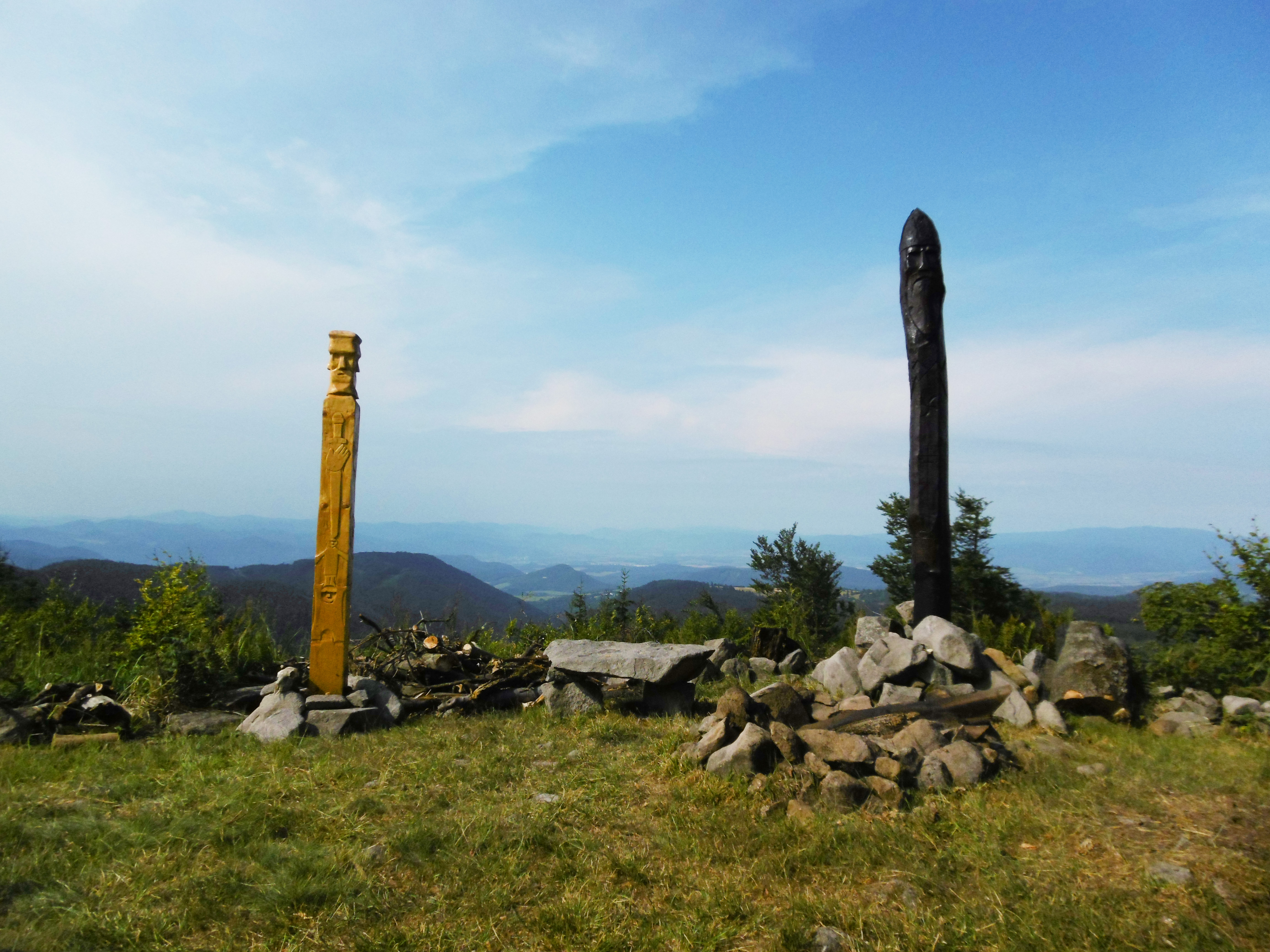
Rodnover shrine on the holy Smrečník hill near Kremnica, Banská Bystrica Region.

== Legislation and freedom of religion ==
The laws of Slovakia guarantee the freedom of religious belief and criminalise the defamation of and discrimination against religious groups. Religious groups may register with the government in order to receive certain privileges, but the threshold of membership required for new groups to register is high, 50,000 members. In the past, government officials have explicitly stated that preventing Islamic organizations from registering is a reason for this requirement, and Muslims are registered as a civic association. In 2022, the Public Defender of Rights (ombudsperson) stated that the registration requirements were unreasonable, discriminatory, and unnecessary; the Ministry of Culture refused to initiate a legal change. As of 2024 new Slovak government is considering to add Christianity as state religion to the constitution.

According to non-governmental organisations and unregistered religious groups, negative attitudes toward unregistered religious groups are common, and hate speech online against religious minorities, especially represented by refugees, is frequent. Politicians from far-right parties in the National Council, the legislative organ of Slovakia, frequently espouse Islamophobic and antisemitic ideas and conspiracy theories, and some of them have faced censure as a consequence of their violation of laws against the propagation of extremist materials and against affiliation with groups dedicated to the suppression of fundamental rights and freedoms. In 2022, some members of the Kotlebovci - Ludova strana Nase Slovensko (Kotleba’s - People’s Party Our Slovakia) (LSNS) and Republika parties were prosecuted for defaming minority religious beliefs and denying the Holocaust.

In 2023, the country was scored 4 out of 4 for religious freedom.

== See also ==
Media related to Religion in Slovakia at Wikimedia Commons

- Religion in the Czech Republic
