= Subcultures in Lithuania =

In the 1970s Soviet Lithuania, there were many groups resisting official Soviet ideology. One of the most notable was hippies.

As the hippie movement faded in the 1980s, punk subculture took over its role of youth's cultural resistance. In those days people participating in punk subculture could still get beaten up by Soviet police (Militsiya), taken for interrogation by KGB, expelled from schools, and sometimes even put into mental health institutions.

== Hippies ==
=== Events ===
Hippyland annual festival taking place in Šiauliai during official city festival Šiaulių dienos (Šiauliai days) since 2003. It combines music festival and political activities (demonstrations against racism, xenophobia, violence, Lithuania's involvement in Iraq war etc.) although latter aspect of Hippyland is not predominant.

=== External links ===
- History of hippie movement in Lithuania (in Lithuanian)

== Punks ==
=== Events ===
Durnių laivas (Ship of fools) was the festival of punk rock bands. It took place in Vilnius, last one in 2002.

Pačių blogiausių grupių festivalis (Festival of worst bands) informally called Blogiukai (Baddies) was a festival of debuting performers of all styles of the alternative and rock music. It was organized by music producer Dovydas Bluvšteinas and took place in Vilnius from 1988 till 1997. Among winners of this festival were Airija, Marijonas ir Bovy, Merlin, Lemon Joy .

=== Clubs ===
Green club

=== Zines ===
The first punk zine in Lithuania was published in 1986 by punk-rocker Atsuktuvas (Nėrius Pečiūra). It was called Mūsų ašigalyje (In Our Pole) . During The Soviet era zine publishing was extremely difficult because private ownership of Xerox machines was prohibited and state-owned Xerox machines were under close watch by KGB . During Perestroyka and Glasnost reforms ban of private ownership of Xerox machines was lifted and zine publishing flourished. When Lithuania regained its independence dozens of zines (most of them short lived) were published all across the country. But with coming of the Internet, zine publishing stopped almost completely. Some zines however continued to exist on the Internet.

K.N.K. (Koks nors kelias - Any Road) punk/alternative zine from Kaunas. First issues were distributed for free, but 1993 in order to finance its existence couple English issues were released and called KNKKKKKK, i.e. KNK c(K)omercial .

Decibelai Offensive

Enjoy This Fucking Day, punk zine from Kaunas edited by Povilas Pauplys now known as (DJ PopX)

=== External links ===
- Website of Green club
- KNKKKKKKKKKKK #2 (1993)

== Metalheads ==
=== Bands ===
Obtest Mandragora

=== Events ===
Death comes... - international festival of death metal in Vilnius, first held in 1992. Tenth and last so far Death comes... festival took place in 2003.

Naujas kraujas (Fresh blood) - annual festival of debuting performers of heavy metal held in Vilnius since 1997.

Ferrum Frost

Velnių malūnas

Kilkim Žaibu - annual black metal/pagan metal/medieval folk music festival held since 1999.

=== Clubs ===
Geležinis kablys

=== Zines ===
Raganos ir Alus (Witches and Beer) was most popular Lithuanian zine ever. It was edited by Ugnius Liogė, founder of Dangus label. The main topics of Raganos ir alus were heavy metal scene of Lithuania and beer. Very important element of Raganos ir Alus was humorous style and its trademark short stories about Buratinos (Soviet adaptation of Pinocchio), the satire on urlaganai. Later Raganos ir Alus become rather conventional heavy metal magazine. As a tribute to its roots one of the last editions of Raganos ir Alus was distributed with small packed portion of baked bread, which is used a snack with beer .

Wounded

Juodas kraujas

Edge of Time

=== Personalities ===
Obituary Jonas Zarazza

=== External links ===
- Website of Naujas kraujas festival
- Giljotina - extreme music club

== Bikers ==
=== Events ===
Bike Show Millennium

=== Clubs ===
Crazy In The Dark MC

=== External links ===
- United website of Lithuania's bikers' clubs (in Lithuanian)

== Goths ==
=== Bands ===
Mano Juodoji Sesuo (My Black Sister) - most influential gothic rock band in Lithuania. The band was formed in 1991 in Kaunas, it has reached the peak of its popularity in mid 1990s. Since then the band's fame has faded, but it continues touring and recording new material . Xess

=== Events ===
Kunigunda Lunaria - an annual darkwave festival taking place in Vilnius since 2002.

=== External links ===
- Official website of Kunigunda Lunaria Festival

== Skinheads ==
=== Bands ===
Diktatūra - the extreme far-right heavy metal band formed in the mid 90s by football hooligans and skinheads Slibinas (Dragon), Kaminas (Chimney) and Indėnas (Indian).

== Neo-pagans ==
=== Organisations ===
Romuva is the largest neo-pagan organisation in Lithuania, founded in 1967 in Kernavė during the Rasos festival. As an official organisation Romuva was established in 1969, but after couple of years it was forced to cease its activities because of the persecutions by the KGB. It was reestablished in 1988. Romuva is led by Jonas Trinkūnas, and has a branch in the United States (led by Andrius Dundzila).

Gediminaičiai - now defunct organisation established by the controversial figure Stasys Urniežius, who used to call himself Duke Vilgaudas.

Baltuva group founded by the editor of Senolių Alka zine Aras Vilkvedis in 1995. It has its own calendar and counts years from the Saulė battle that took place in 1236.

Andželikos Tamaš žynių mokykla (Andželika Tamaš Wizard School). Organisation led by Andželika Tamaš. It conflicts with Romuva followers, and accuses them of distortion of the religion of ancient Balts, but still participates in events held by Romuva.

Devynių akmenų klubas New Age organisation also known as Baltovės žinyčia

=== Zines and magazines ===
Druvis

Senasis Žynys - newspaper (magazine since in 1995) of Andželika Tamaš.

a.s.d. (Auka seniems dievams)

Senolių Alka

=== Events ===
Mėnuo Juodaragis (Black-Horned Moon) - annual Baltic culture, alternative music, folk music and experimental music festival organized since 1995 in various locations all over Lithuania.

Kilkim žaibu - (Rise with Thunder) folk/pagan metal festival held in Joniškis.

=== Bands ===
Obtest - pagan black metal.

Wejdas - tribal ambient project.

== Gay and lesbian ==
=== Organisations ===
Lietuvos gėjų lyga (Lithuanian Gay League) - national organisation of gay, lesbian and bisexual people of Lithuania established in 1993. True member of International Lesbian and Gay Association (ILGA) from 1994.

Sappho – Lietuvos lesbiečių lyga (Lithuanian Lesbian League) registered in 1995.

=== Clubs ===
Amsterdamas - first gay club in Lithuania.

Men's Factory

Soho - nightclub in Vilnius.

=== Periodicals ===
Naglis - the first gay magazine in Lithuania, established in 1993. In the beginning it was freely available from newsagents, but later its status was changed to adult erotic publication and Naglis became available only from sex shops..

Amsterdamas - a periodical running for a few years from 1994.

LGL Žinios (LGL News) Lithuanian Gay League newspaper established in 1994.

== Relationship between subcultures ==
In 1980s and 1990s one of the most important elements of the relationship between youth subcultures in Lithuania was the conflict between urlaganai and the most of other youth subcultures. Urlaganai are "the No.1 enemy" for punks, fans of heavy metal, goths and ravers. Urlaganai are making no distinguishment between punks, goths and metallists and call them all banglai, bangladešai.
