= Ouroboros: Seasons of Life—Women's Passages =

Neopagan oratorio by Kay Gardner

Ouroboros: Seasons of Life—Women's Passages is a Neopagan oratorio by musician, author, and composer Kay Gardner. Written between 1992 and 1994, it was produced by Ladyslipper Records and recorded by an all-female group for the 1994 National Women's Music Festival. Ouroboros: Seasons of Life musically portrays a woman's life cycle from birth to death using Neopagan symbols and imagery. The Triple Goddess aspects of Maiden, Mother, and Crone are prominently featured, as are the four seasons and Neopagan holidays.

== See also ==
- Neopagan music
