= Jonas Trinkūnas =

Lithuanian ethnologist (1939–2014)

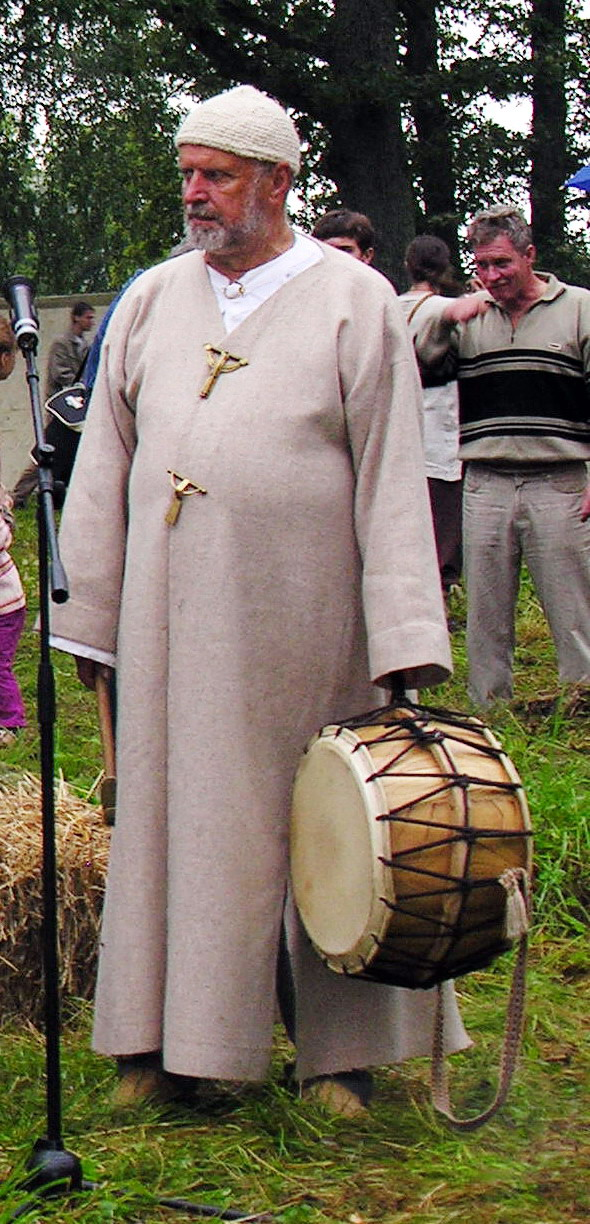
- Romuva Krivis (High Priest) Jonas Trinkūnas at the 2009 Baltic historical re-enactment festival Apuolė-854
- Born: Jonas Trinkūnas; 28 February 1939; Klaipėda, Lithuania
- Died: 20 January 2014 (aged 74); Vilnius, Lithuania
- Other name: Jaunius (The Young One)
- Education: Vilnius University
- Known for: Revival of the Romuvan religion
- Title: High priest (krivis) of Romuva
- Term: 2002–2014
- Successor: Inija Trinkūnienė
- Spouse: Inija Trinkūnienė
- Children: Žemyna, Rimgailė, Vėtra, Ugnė and Indrė
- Awards: Order of the Lithuanian Grand Duke Gediminas (2013)

Jonas Trinkūnas (28 February 1939 – 20 January 2014) was the founder of Lithuania's pagan revival Romuva, as well as being an ethnologist and folklorist.

== In the Soviet Union ==
Trinkūnas was born in 1939 in Klaipėda. He finished primary school in Kaunas in 1957 and in 1965 he earned a degree in philology at the Faculty of Lithuanian Language and Literature of Vilnius University. While still a student, he founded the Society of Friends of India (Lithuanian: Indijos bičulių draugija). The Vedic traditions of India were what pushed him to search for the roots of Lithuanian culture and its spiritual meaning.

In 1967, Trinkūnas and his friends organised the first Rasa (Summer Solstice) celebration in Kernavė, which was met with disapproval by the Soviet authorities. Despite pressure from the KGB, Lithuanians organized folklore and ethnographic ensembles, lit the bonfires on Rasa and candles on Vėlinės (All Saints' Day)—symbols important to the cultural vitality of the nation. Trinkūnas was one of the founders of the Ethnographic Ramuva Society of Vilnius University. He studied folklore, traveled to Lithuanian villages for the purpose of writing down Lithuania's living culture, songs and traditions. His students and followers continue to call themselves ramuviai and žygeiviai (“travellers”).

From 1969 to 1973, Trinkūnas worked at the Faculty of Philology at Vilnius University as a post-graduate and lecturer. In 1973, for his folklore studies which were considered to be dissident activities, Trinkūnas was forced to leave the university. Until 1988 he was forbidden from engaging in any scientific research work and activities in his profession. Therefore, for more than two decades, Trinkūnas dedicated his life to studying the living traditions of Lithuania. Travelling from village to village, he listened to and learned their songs, stories, customs and beliefs. These experiences turned the Ramuva folklorist into the founder of Romuva.

== In independent Lithuania ==
With the beginning of Sąjūdis (the Reform Movement of Lithuania), Trinkūnas was able to return to the university and worked as an assistant at the Ethics division of the Institute of Philosophy and Sociology. From 1990 until 1993, he was the head of the Ethnic Culture division of the Ministry of Culture. From 1994 he worked as a researcher at the Ethics and Ethno-Sociology division of the Institute of Philosophy and Sociology; he lectured on ethnic culture at Vilnius Pedagogical University, participated in numerous international conferences and events related to old pagan faiths, authored many articles in both the Lithuanian and foreign presses and penned several books. He was a member of the ritual folklore ensemble Kūlgrinda, Etninės kultūros draugija (Ethnic Culture Society), Tautos namai (Home of the Nation), Mažosios Lietuvos reikalų taryba (Board of the Affairs of Lithuania Minor), Prūsa club and other organisations.

Trinkūnas’ scientific and ethno-cultural activities bloomed during the post-Soviet period in Lithuania. When Trinkūnas was head of the Ethnic Culture division of the Ministry of Education and Culture, this division cared not only for ethnographic and folklore ensembles, issues of Lithuanian education and culture in Lithuania Minor and Kaliningrad Oblast, but also extensive publishing activities. As Head of the Ethnic Culture division, Trinkūnas demanded that a special Jonas Basanavičius Award be founded, which would stimulate folklore research and activities. This was also the same time when the idea was raised to found the Council for the Protection of Ethnic Culture, accountable to the Seimas, which even now continues to implement the Law on National Protection of Ethnic Culture. In 1992, together with his followers, Trinkūnas registered the Romuva religious community, which later included all of the communities throughout Lithuania and became the community of the ancient Baltic religion. In 1998, at the World Congress of Ethnic Religions (WCER, now the ECER) in Vilnius, Trinkūnas was chosen as this organisation's Chairman. Later, as Chairman of this Congress and spiritual leader of the Lithuanian Romuva, he was invited to different events in India, Australia and the United States. In 2002, Trinkūnas was ordained as Krivis (High Priest) of Romuva and was given the name Jaunius (from jaunas meaning “young”), symbolising the rebirth of the ancestors' faith.

In 1997, along with Venantas Mačiekus, for the organisation of the Ramuva cultural reform movement, Jonas Trinkūnas was awarded the State Jonas Basanavičius Award.

In 2013, on the occasion of the Statehood Day, for active anti-Soviet dissident activities, organising of ethnographic activities as well as underground distribution of religious and nationalistic literature, Jonas Trinkūnas was awarded by the President of Lithuania the Order of Grand Duke of Lithuania Gediminas.

== Death ==
In 2014, Jonas Trinkūnas died at Vilnius (Lithuania's capital) at age 74, and his cremated remains were buried at Rokantiškes cemetery. He was able to complete his final song, An kalno an aukštojo, for the Kūlgrinda album before his death.

== See also ==
- Subcultures in Lithuania
- Inija Trinkūnienė
- Romuva (religion)
