= Kūlgrinda (band) =

Lithuanian pagan folk band (1989-)

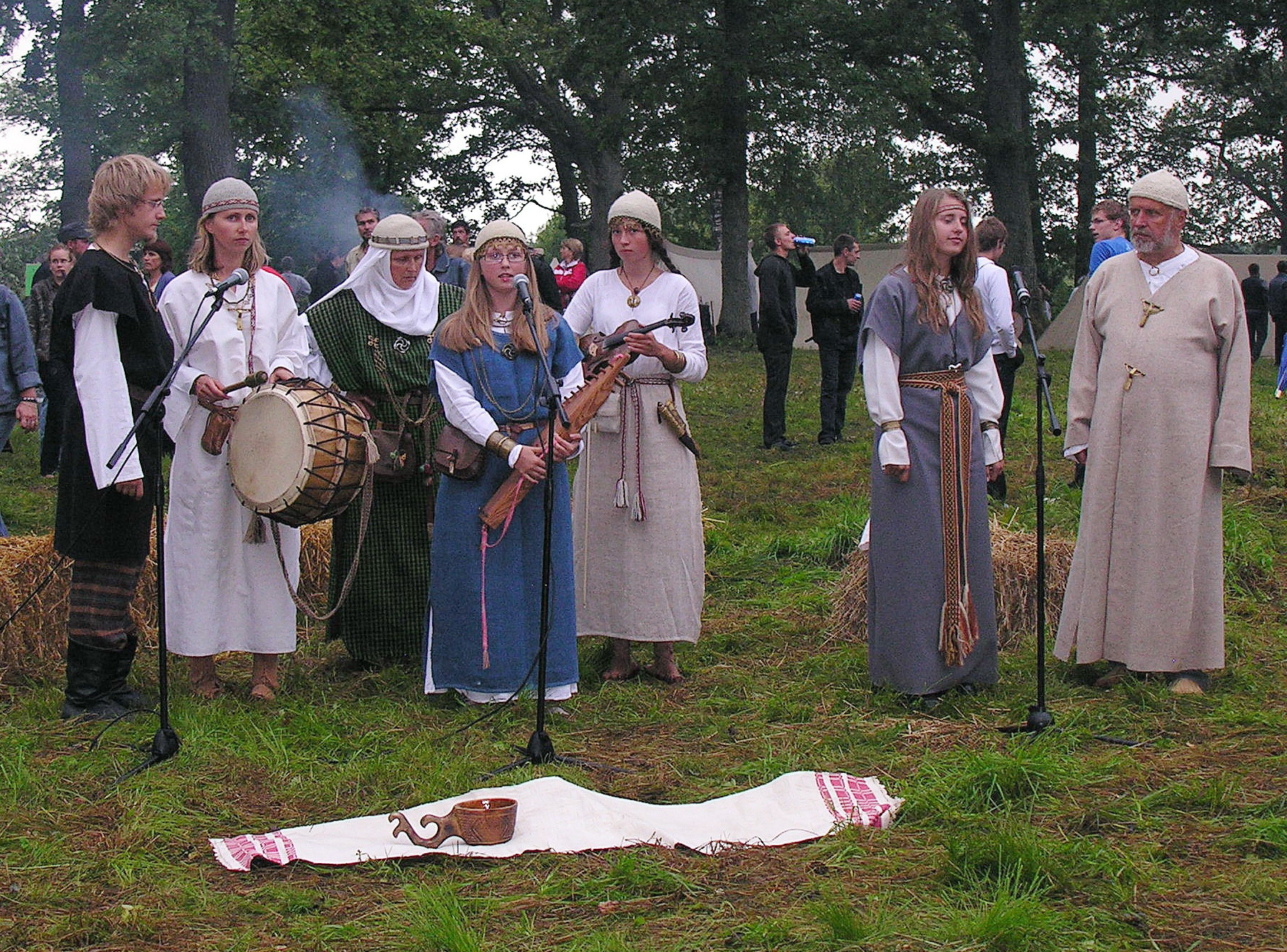
- Kūlgrinda performing in Apuolė in 2009

Background information
- Origin: Vilnius, Lithuania
- Genres: Folk music Religious music
- Years active: 1989 – present
- Labels: Dangus Records; Aurea Studija
- Members: Inija Trinkūnienė
- Past members: Jonas Trinkūnas

Kūlgrinda is a folk music group from Vilnius, Lithuania, established in 1989 by Inija and Jonas Trinkūnas. The group is connected to the Lithuanian neopagan movement Romuva and often performs as a part of the movement's ceremonies.

== History ==
The band was founded in 1989 by Jonas Trinkūnas and his wife Inija Trinkūnienė who also were the leaders of the modern Pagan movement Romuva. The band has from the start functioned as the musical expression of this movement. Some of the recorded material has functioned as "musical scriptures" for the Romuva members and the band has regularly participated as an integral part of the movement's events. On the website of Romuva, Kūlgrinda is described as a "ritual folklore group".

The band owes its name to kūlgrinda – a secret Samogitian underwater causeway. Kūlgrinda's music typically consists of straightforward folk music performances with little studio enhancement and a focus on the vocal performances. It has specialised on sutartinės, a traditional form of polyphonic song-chant where several vocalists perform interlocking melodies that through rhythmic repetition create a pattern of musical expression. The musicologist Daiva Račiūnaitė-Vyčinienė has compared this technique to the weaving of a multicoloured cloth.

The band has collaborated with other artists such as the electronic musician Donis, the singer Rasa Serra and the heavy metal band Ugnėlakis. The latter collaboration resulted in the forming of the folk rock group Žalvarinis.

== Discography ==
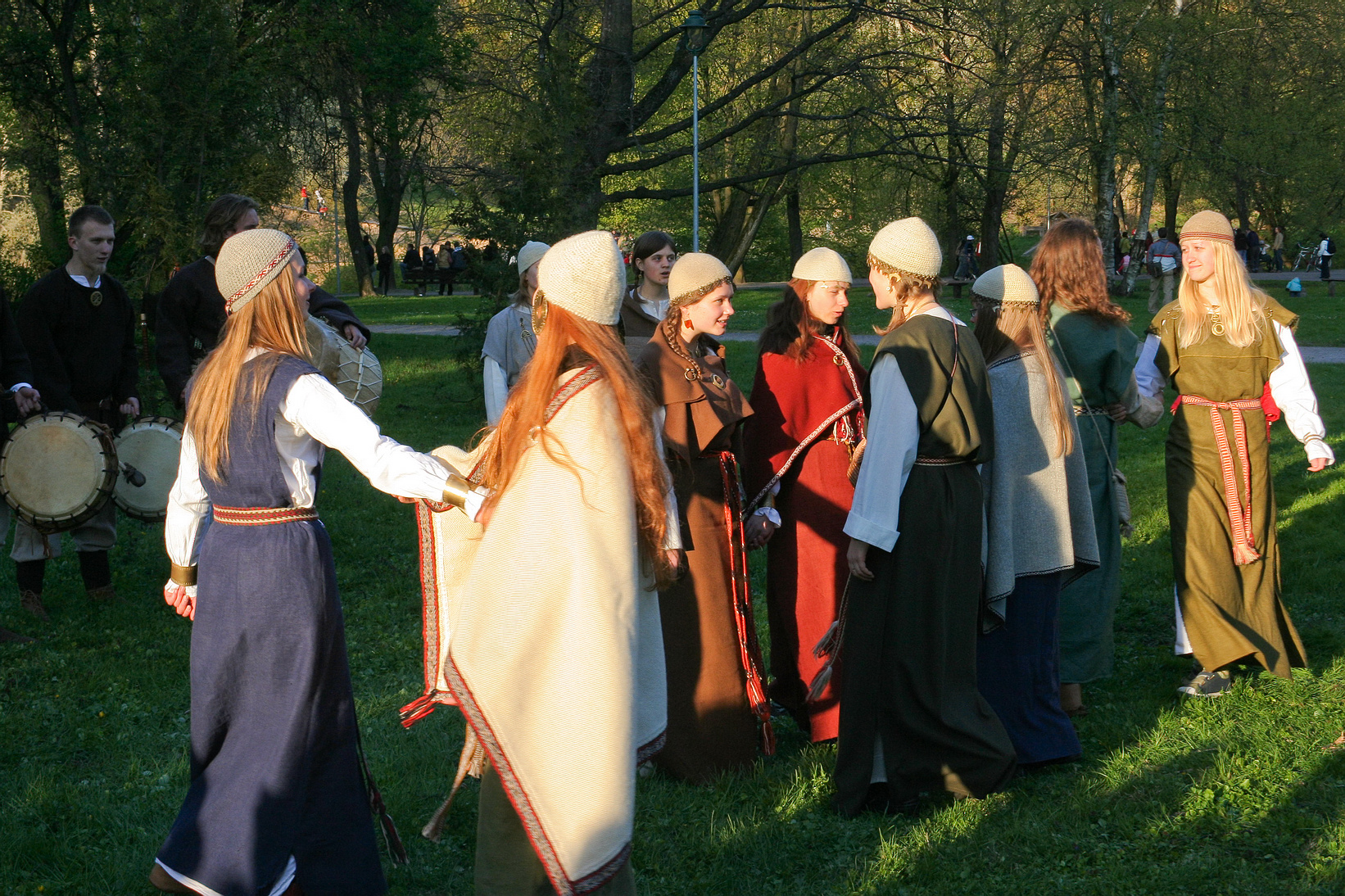
Kūlgrinda performing in Vilnius in 2007

Kulgrinda albums were initially released by Dangus Records. Later the band signed with Aurea Studija.

- 1996: Kūlgrinda – cassette
- 2002: Ugnėlakis su Kūlgrinda – with Ugnėlakis
- 2002: Ugnies Apeigos ("Rite of Fire")
- 2003: Sotvaras – with Donis
- 2003: Perkūno Giesmės ("Hymns of Perkūnas")
- 2005: Prūsų Giesmės ("Prussian Hymns", sung in the extinct Old Prussian language)
- 2007: Giesmės Saulei ("Hymns of the Sun")
- 2009: Giesmės Valdovui Gediminui ("Hymns to King Gediminas")
- 2013: Giesmės Žemynai ("Hymns to Žemyna") – with Donis
- 2014: Laimos Giesmės ("The Hymns of Laima")
- 2018: Giesmės Austėjai ("Hymns to Austėja")

== See also ==
- Neopagan music
