= Donis =

Lithuanian music project

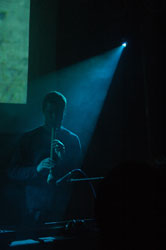
- Donis in 2006

Background information
- Origin: Klaipėda, Lithuania
- Genres: ambient, neofolk, experimental
- Years active: 1998–present
- Label: Dangus
- Members: Donatas Bielkauskas
- Website: Official site

Donis is a Lithuanian ambient, neofolk and experimental music project created by the Klaipėda multi-instrumentalist Donatas Bielkauskas. He was also a member of electronic music projects Wejdas, Notanga, Ha Lela, Eirimė.

Donis has released 8 CDs. Most of Donis’ works are musical interpretations of Baltic tribal ethnomusic. His most well known album is Bitė Lingo. It has 8 archaic Lithuanian war songs interpreted by folk vocalist Rasa Serra. The album Švilpiai contains ancient ocarina (švilpynė) music. The album Sotvaras is made together with famous Lithuanian pagan band Kūlgrinda members. Donis has also made an album of a Greek mythology theme Alexandreia and some experimental-electronic works.

== Awards ==
- A.LT 2006 – the best ethno artist

== Discography ==
- 1998 – Deinaina
- 2002 – Baltos Juodos Klajos
- 2003 – Švilpiai
- 2003 – Sotvaras, with Kūlgrinda
- 2004 – Vacuum
- 2006 – Bite lingo, with singer Rasa Serra
- 2007 – Alexandreia
- 2010 – Kas tave šaukia, with singer Rasa Serra
- 2013 – Bars Bars
