= Žiarislav =

Slovak musician, writer and leader of Slavic Native spiritual movement in Slovakia

- Born: Miroslav Švický; 1967 (age 58–59)
- Occupations: Musician; Writer
- Known for: Founder of Rodný kruh
- Website: www.ziarislav.sk

Miroslav Žiarislav Švický (born in 1967), best known as Žiarislav, is a Slovak musician, writer and organiser within modern Slavic paganism. He writes and performs music inspired by Slovak folk music. He has written books about Slavic spirit and is the founder and leader of the modern pagan organisation Rodný kruh (lit. 'Native Circle').

== Early life and education ==
Miroslav Žiarislav Švický was born in 1967. He was trained as a geologist and lived in Bratislava and Trnava where he wrote for the newspapers Zmena and Smena. He began to write books on spirituality and ended his journalist career to be a farmer and musician.

== Slavic paganism ==
Švický is active in modern Slavic paganism in Slovakia as a teacher, writer and keeper of traditions and calendars. He has adopted the name Žiarislav, which roughly means "The one who celebrates light". He is the founder and leader of the Rodný kruh (lit. 'Native Circle'), with which he hosts traditional native celebrations. The group does not have a formal organizational structure and describes itself as a "society for native natural spirituality". Since 2000, it has published the magazine Diva.

Žiarislav has presented his conceptions of ancient Slavic culture and Slavic natural spirituality in several books, including Návrat Slovenov (1997), Čaro štyroch živlov (1998) and Čaro prírody (1999). He rejects the idea that folklore is something that only concerns outdated lifestyles and emphasises the need for creativity when dealing with folkloric material. Common themes in his works include patriotism, environmentalism, personal health, respect for traditions, creativity, anti-consumerism and rustic aesthetics. Diva was later renamed Rodná cesta (Native Way). The magazine's internet version is published regularly on the website Rodná cesta.

The Slovak mainstream media have been ambivalent about Žiarislav and his religious activities: he is typically portrayed as a romantic character who lives in harmony with nature. The sociologist Miroslav Tížik describes his teachings as a combination of some immutable beliefs concerning knowledge, Slavic identity and nature, and a dynamic approach to doctrine and vocabulary, which continuously change in his publications. Tížik connects Žiarislav's rhetoric to the New Age movement, to the period of the Slovak national awakening and to the Romanticism of Ľudovít Štúr. Žiarislav has inspired other modern pagan groups in Slovakia, including the Perúnov kruh and the Slovanský kruh.

== Music ==
Žiarislav is a songwriter, singer and multi-instrumentalist who makes his own instruments. He performs with his band Bytosti. He draws inspiration from Slovak folk music and contemporary pagan folk. His spiritual views are integrated in his music and he rejects the distinction between religious and musical activities. His music has been a major part of his spiritual outreach.
