= Inija Trinkūnienė =

Lithuanian Romuva priest & psychologist

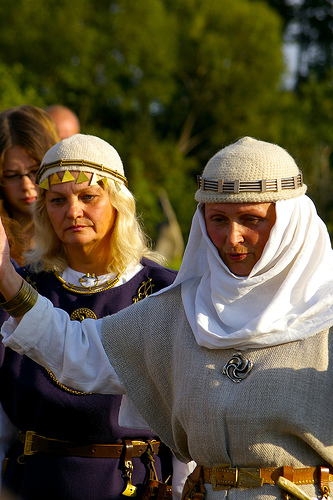
- Born: 25 October 1951 (age 74); Kelmė, Lithuanian SSR, Soviet Union
- Education: Vilnius University
- Occupations: Ethnologist, folklorist, sociologist, psychologist
- Title: High priestess (krivė) of Romuva
- Term: 2014–present
- Predecessor: Jonas Trinkūnas (2002–2014)
- Spouse: Jonas Trinkūnas
- Children: Rimgailė, Vėtra, Ugnė and Indrė

Inija Trinkūnienė (born 25 October 1951) is a Lithuanian ethnologist, folklorist, sociologist, psychologist, head of folk music group Kūlgrinda and the high priestess (krivė) of the Romuva community of the old Lithuanian faith. She became the high priestess after the death of the previous high priest (krivis), her husband Jonas Trinkūnas, in 2014. She is a founding member of the European Congress of Ethnic Religions. She holds a master's degree in psychology from Vilnius University. She was a featured speaker in the Indigenous Plenary Session at the Parliament of the World Religions in Toronto in 2015.

== See also ==
2015 Address to 2015 Parliament of World Religions on YouTube.
