= Kay Gardner (composer) =

American classical composer

- Born: February 8, 1941; Freeport, New York
- Died: August 28, 2002 (aged 61); Bangor, Maine
- Notable work: Sounding the Inner Landscape: Music as Medicine (1990, book); Ouroboros: Seasons of Life—Women's Passages (1994, oratorio)
- Partner: Colleen Fitzgerald
- Awards: Maryanne Hartmann Award; Honorary Doctor of Fine Arts from the University of Maine
- Website: kaygardner.com

Kay Gardner (February 8, 1941 – August 28, 2002), also known as Cosmos Wonder-Child, was an American musician, composer, author, and Dianic priestess known for using music for creative and healing purposes. She was very active in promoting the work of contemporary female musicians and was a pioneering figure in women's music.

== Biography ==
Born in Freeport, New York, Gardner wrote and performed her first piano composition at the age of four. When she was eight, she began learning how to play the flute. She subsequently went on to gain performance experience in chamber, orchestral, and vocal music. Gardner composed works for flute, piano, chamber ensemble, orchestra, and choir. She is considered a founding foremother of women's music. She sued the Bangor Symphony Orchestra for sex discrimination because during their search for a new music director, they asked orchestra members if they could "tolerate a woman" as a conductor.

She started her own independent record label, Even Keel Records, and produced 17 albums – both of her own music and the work of others. In 1974, Gardner and Alix Dobkin recorded and produced a nationally distributed album with explicitly lesbian-feminist lyrics (Lavender Jane Loves Women, Women's Wax Works). This album was one of the first to be produced by an all-lesbian team, and the band behind it, Lavender Jane, was one of the first openly lesbian bands.

With her first recording, Mooncircles (featuring Meg Christian), released in 1975, she pioneered the field of sound healing; her 1990 book Sounding the Inner Landscape: Music as Medicine was later used in medical schools. She was initiated into Dianic Wicca by Z. Budapest in 1975. In 1977, Kay Gardner wrote her first piece for orchestra ("Rain Forest"), and conducted the premiere (her conducting debut) the following year at the National Women's Music Festival in Champaign-Urbana, Illinois, with Antonia Brico in attendance.

Between 1976 and 1984, Gardner worked on A Rainbow Path, a large musical composition designed for meditation on the eight energy centers, or chakras, of the human organism. She conducted a women's music orchestra production of it in 1988 at the National Women's Music Festival. Gardner also co-founded the New England Women's Symphony. In 1980 she helped produce a recording of a performance of the New England Women's Symphony performing music by women composers and conducted by several women. The album was produced and distributed by Galaxia Records. She wrote Ouroboros: Seasons of Life—Women's Passages, a Neopagan oratorio. Written between 1992 and 1994, it was produced by Ladyslipper Records and recorded by an all-female group for the 1994 National Women's Music Festival. Ouroboros: Seasons of Life musically portrays a woman's life cycle from birth to death using Neopagan symbols and imagery. The Triple Goddess aspects of Maiden, Mother, and Crone are prominently featured, as are the four seasons and Neopagan holidays.

Gardner was a choir director, radio personality, women's spirituality priestess, and a staff writer for HOT WIRE: The Journal of Women's Music and Culture. She is credited with envisioning the Acoustic Stage venue at the Michigan Womyn's Music Festival (with cellist Rachel Alexander), as well as founding and directing the Women With Wings sacred singing circle. She received the Maryanne Hartmann Award in 1995 and an honorary Doctor in fine Arts from the University of Maine. She died of a heart attack on August 28, 2002.

== Works ==
=== Chamber works (published by Sea Gnomes Music) ===
- Romance
- Touching Souls
- Crystal Bells (1976)
- Lunamuse (on Beethoven's Moonlight Sonata)
- Mooncircles (1975, Urana Records/Wise Women Enterprises, distributed by Olivia Records)
- Prayer to Aphrodite
- Atlantis Rising
- The Rising Sun: Variations on an American Blues Theme
- The Seasons
- Winter Night, Gibbous Moon: Saga for Eleven Flutes
- Vocalise (on Bach's Prelude in C-minor)
- Earth Shadows for Bassoon & Chamber Ensemble
- Viriditas
- North Coast Nights
- Rondo
- Sailing Song
- Women at the Lakeside
- A Rainbow Path (Ladyslipper Records, 1984)

=== Orchestral works ===
- Lament for the Thousands (2001)
- Century March
- Rainforest (1978, for chamber orchestra; recorded by the Bournemouth Sinfonietta, Leonarda Records)
- The Rising Sun: Variations on an American Blues Theme (1981)
- Night Chant (1979)
- Prayer to Aphrodite
- The Greenwood
- Quiet Harbor
- Women's Orchestral Works performed by the New England Women's Symphony (produced and distributed by Galaxia Records)

=== Oratorio and Opera ===
- Ouroboros: Seasons of Life--Women's Passages (text: Charlie Hutchins and Ila Suzanne)
- Ladies' Voices: A Short, Short Opera (text: Gertrude Stein)

=== Choral Works (Mixed Chorus) ===
- Aquarian Anthem (text: Kay Gardner)
- Time is But the Stream... (text: Henry David Thoreau)
- Stopping By Woods (text: Robert Frost)
- Beloved Presence (text: Mohammed Hafiz)
- Three Sumerian Hymns (for chorus & large ensemble)
- Affirmation: A Benediction (text: The Upanishads)
- Mary Had a Baby (Traditional Spiritual)
- The Banshee Song (text: Kay Gardner)
- Lucina's Light: A Yuletide Pageant/Cantata (Women's Chorus)
- When We Made the Music (text: Kay Gardner)
- The Rootwomen (text: J. Goldspinner)
- A Creed for Free Women (text: Elsa Gidlow)
- Dancing (text: Susan Griffin)
- Song of the Dying Amazon (text: Shirley Tannenbaum)
- The Spider and the Fly (text: Mary Howitt)
- Charge of the Star Goddess (text: Traditional)

=== Solo Instrumental Works ===
- A River Sings (for solo cello)
- The Elusive White Roebuck (for horn & piano)
- Moonflow (on Beethoven's Moonlight Sonata; for flute & piano)
- Innermoods (for flute & guitar)
- Seven Modal Improvisations (piano with any instrument/s)
- Mariachi (for marimba)
- Travelin' (for guitar)
- Thou Little Tiny Child (piano arrangement of The Coventry Carol)

=== Solo Vocal Works ===
- Mother's Evening Prayer (text: Mary Baker Eddy)
- On Marriage (text: Kahlil Gibran)
- Fragments (text: Hsin Ping)
- Mindful of You (text: Edna St. Vincent Millay)
- Three Mother Songs
- Two Sapphic Songs (text: Elsa Gidlow)
- Wise Woman
- Beautiful Friend
- Changing

=== With Lavender Jane ===
- Lavender Jane Loves Women (1973, with Alix Dobkin and Patches Attom)

=== Written works ===
- Music as Medicine: The Art & Science of Healing With Sound (9-hour lecture series on tape; Sounds True)
- Sounding the Inner Landscape: Music as Medicine (1990, ISBN 9780962720031)
