= Romuva (religion) =

Lithuanian pagan religion

- Flag of the Romuva religion
- High priestess (krivė): Inija Trinkūnienė (2015–present)
- Founder: Vydūnas
- Origin: 20th century (revival)
- Members: ~3,900 (2021)
- Official website: romuva.lt

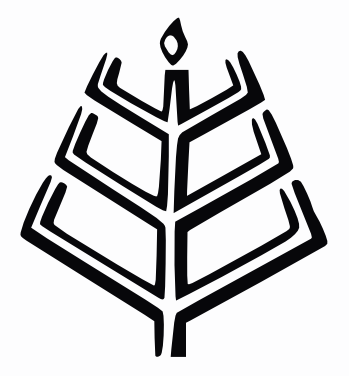
A pattern of the World Tree (Aušros Medis) also commonly used as a symbol of Romuva.

Romuva is a polytheistic religion derived from the traditional mythology of the Lithuanians, that reconstructs or revives the religious rituals of the Lithuanians prior to their state's Christianization in 1387. Practitioners of Romuva aim to continue Baltic polytheism traditions that survived in folklore, customs and superstition. Romuva is a polytheistic faith that asserts the sanctity of nature and ancestor worship. Many adherents see practicing the Romuva faith as a celebration of cultural pride and traditional art forms. Romuva practices include retelling Baltic folklore, observing traditional holidays, playing traditional Baltic music, and singing traditional dainos (songs), as well as ecological activism and stewarding sacred places.

Romuva primarily exists in Lithuania but there are also practitioner congregations in Australia, Canada, Russia, the United States, and England, largely due to the Lithuanian diaspora. There are similar but distinct believers of Baltic polytheistic faiths in neighbouring countries, including Dievturība in Latvia. According to the 2001 census, there were approximately 1,200 people in Lithuania identifying with Romuva. That number jumped to around 5,100 in the 2011 census. The older Lithuanian religion that Romuva seeks to revive was suppressed by the various authorities that ruled over Lithuania since the state's mass de jure conversion to Christianity from the 15th century. In 2024, Romuva was given state recognition by Lithuania.

== Etymology ==
The terms Romuva, Romovė, and Ruomuva came from medieval written sources in East Prussia mentioning the polytheistic Baltic temple Romowe. The word has meanings of "temple" and "sanctuary", but, further, also "abode of inner peace". The Baltic root ram-/rām-, from which Romuva derives, has the meaning of 'calm, serene, quiet', stemming from the Proto-Indo-European *h₁rem-.

== History ==
=== Ancient and medieval Lithuanian faith ===
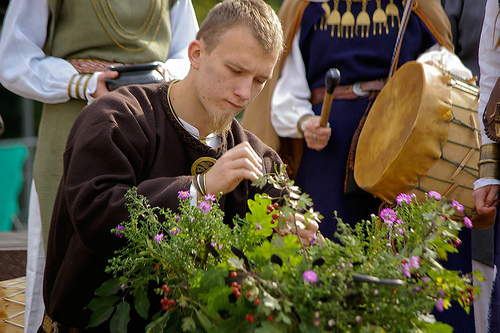
Romuva ceremony

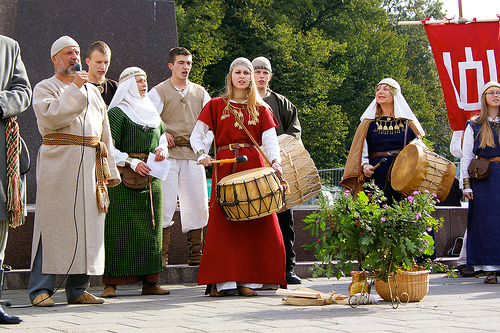
Romuva ceremony

Whatever religion the original inhabitants of the Baltic region had predates recorded history. Mesolithic hunters, gatherers, and anglers of the region practised a religion focused on their occupations. Marija Gimbutas controversially suggested that agrarian settlers of around 3500–2500 BCE were examples of Earth-worshipping Old Europeans. After this, Indo-Europeans entered the area and brought with them their Proto-Indo-European religion. This religion, including elements from the religious past of the region, evolved into the polytheism which is attested in the Middle Ages and later.

The adherents of this Baltic religion prospered relatively unhindered until the 9th century when they began to come under pressure from outside Christian forces. The Annals of Quedlinburg mention a missionary, Bruno of Querfurt, who was killed along with 18 men by Yotvingians while attempting to convert the polytheists in the area of Lithuania and Prussia in 1009 CE. This was the first time the name of Lithuania was mentioned in written sources. Other sources suggest Bruno had been killed for violating The Holy Forest and destroying statues of gods.

Beginning in 1199, the Roman Catholic Church declared crusades against Baltic pagans. Grand Duke Mindaugas was Christianized with his family and warriors in 1251 so that the Crusades might be ended by the Church. But Mindaugas still worshiped polytheistic deities as the Hypatian chronicle mentions. He sacrificed to the polytheistic Supreme god (*Andajus, later Dievas), Perkūnas, Teliavelis (god of smiths), and *Žvorūna (goddess of forests and hunters). Despite any insincerity and realpolitik in his Christian faith, some subsidiary states of Mindaugas' Grand Duchy rebelled in protest. In 1261 Mindaugas renounced his Christian faith as his official conversion failed to placate the Crusaders.

Even in the face of Crusaders, by the time of Grand Duke Gediminas, the Grand Duchy of Lithuania expanded its influence until it formed the political centre of a vast and prosperous "polytheistic Empire". Lithuanians thus survived late into history as appreciable representatives of ancient European polytheism, preserving this tradition as the official, state religion until the late 14th and early 15th centuries when Christianity was finally accepted by the states of the Grand Duchy, again for political reasons. Thus, for a time, Lithuanians were the last-known non-nomadic people in Europe practicing a European ethnic religion until the resurgence of polytheism in Europe in the 20th and 21st centuries. Unofficially, Lithuanians continued in their adherence to traditional polytheism.

=== Revival ===
The Romantic epoch started in the 19th century. This led Lithuanians to look back to their past for both intellectual and spiritual inspiration. The national revival started and Lithuanian intelligentsia idealised ancient polytheism and folklore. Some historians wanted to prove the beauty of ancient polytheism and even started creating new aspects of Lithuanian mythology. One of the most famous of these was Theodor Narbutt who edited Ancient Greek myths and created new Lithuanian ones.

In the beginning of the 20th century, ancient polytheistic traditions were still continued in folklore and customs. People were celebrating ancient polytheistic festivals mixed with Christian traditions. Such festivals include Vėlinės (day of dead souls, similar to Celtic Halloween), Užgavėnės (festival when winter ends and spring begins), and Rasa or Joninės. For Užgavėnės, people in Samogitia may dress in costumes including masks and burn an idol of an old lady, called Morė or Giltine, goddess of death.

=== Modern folk religion ===
The philosopher Vydūnas is taken as a sort of founding father of Romuva. He actively promoted awareness of and participation in polytheistic festivals. Vydūnas saw Christianity as foreign to Lithuanians, and instead he brought his attention to what he saw as the spiritual vision of the adherents of the traditional Baltic religion. He ascribed to this a sense of awe in their cosmology, as they saw the universe as a great mystery, and respect for every living being as well as the earth in their morality, as they saw the whole world and every individual as a symbol of life as a whole. The Divine was represented by fire, which was as such used ritually to worship the divine and itself held sacred. Vydūnas had given special treatment to this religion of the Lithuanians in his drama Amžina ugnis (An Eternal Flame). Among this and other works, Vydūnas exalted the faith as being on the highest level of spiritual expression, along with other forms which he recognized.

Domas Šidlauskas-Visuomis (1878–1944) began to create Vaidevutybė (Baltic polytheism) in 1912. In the 1920s the Latvian folk religion movement Dievturība was started by Ernests Brastiņš. The main problem was that the first movements were based on limited folklore sources and influenced by Far Eastern traditions such as Hinduism and Buddhism. Even so, the idea of Romuva did not die during the Soviet occupation of Lithuania.

=== Soviet suppression ===
The Lithuanian polytheistic movement was stopped by Soviet occupation in 1940. Due to the nationalist nature of Romuva, the faith was suppressed during the Soviet occupation and many practitioners were executed or deported to forced labor camps in Siberia. After Joseph Stalin's death the cultural life became more free.

A clandestine Romuva group is known to have existed within a labor camp in Inta, Russia. After the members were released and returned to Lithuania around 1960, some of these practitioners, along with Jonas Trinkūnas, formed the Vilnius Ethnological Ramuva and began organizing public celebrations of traditional Lithuanian religious holidays, starting with Rasa in 1967. In 1971 the Soviets expelled the members from the university they attended and exiled the leaders. By 1988, when the power of the Soviet Union was waning and Lithuanian independence was on the horizon, Romuva groups began reorganizing in the Baltic nations and practicing their religion in the open.

=== Independence ===
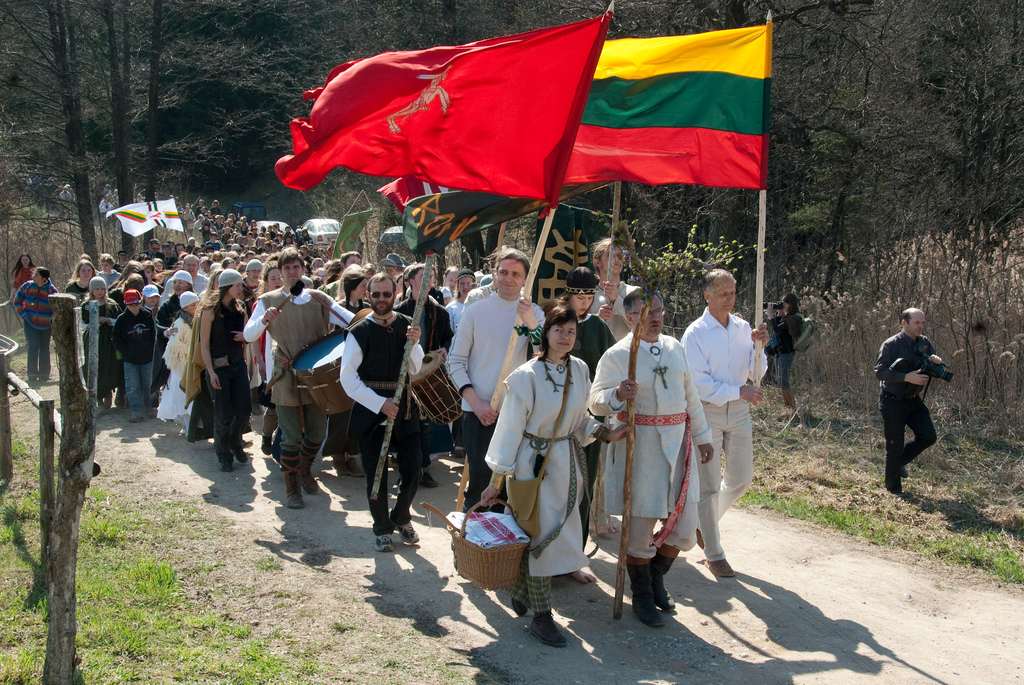
A Romuva procession led by Jonas Vaiškūnas in 2009.

After Lithuania regained independence in 1990, Romuva was recognised as an Ancient Baltic faith community in 1992. Under the auspices of the Law on Religious Communities and Associations which was passed in Lithuania in 1995, Romuva gained recognition as a "non-traditional" religion. The law requires a minimum of 25 years of existence before such a religion can receive the state support reserved for "traditional" religions.

In 1990, Trinkūnas created Kūlgrinda, a band that performs in many Romuva festivals. The community was organized and led by krivių krivaitis (high priest) Jonas Trinkūnas until his death in 2014. He was buried according to the old Baltic traditions. His wife Inija Trinkūnienė was chosen as the new krivė (high priestess) and her ordination was held on 31 May 2015, in Vilnius on the Gediminas Hill. She is the first woman to become krivė in the long polytheistic history.

On 24 May 2018, Seimas passed a proposal for granting state recognition to Romuva and began discussing it in the parliamentary committees. In June 2019, Seimas voted to reject Romuva's petition to be recognized as a "traditional" religion. The law provides that the petition could be resubmitted in ten years. The proposal was opposed mainly by the members of the Homeland Union, particularly by Žygimantas Pavilionis. Romuva sued Lithuania in the European Court of Human Rights and won a unanimous decision in June 2021 that the Seimas did not remain "neutral and impartial in exercising their regulatory powers". Romuva was allowed to reapply for recognition after three months of the ruling. According to the 2021 census, Romuva had 3,917 followers. State recognition was granted in 2024.

== Religious practices ==
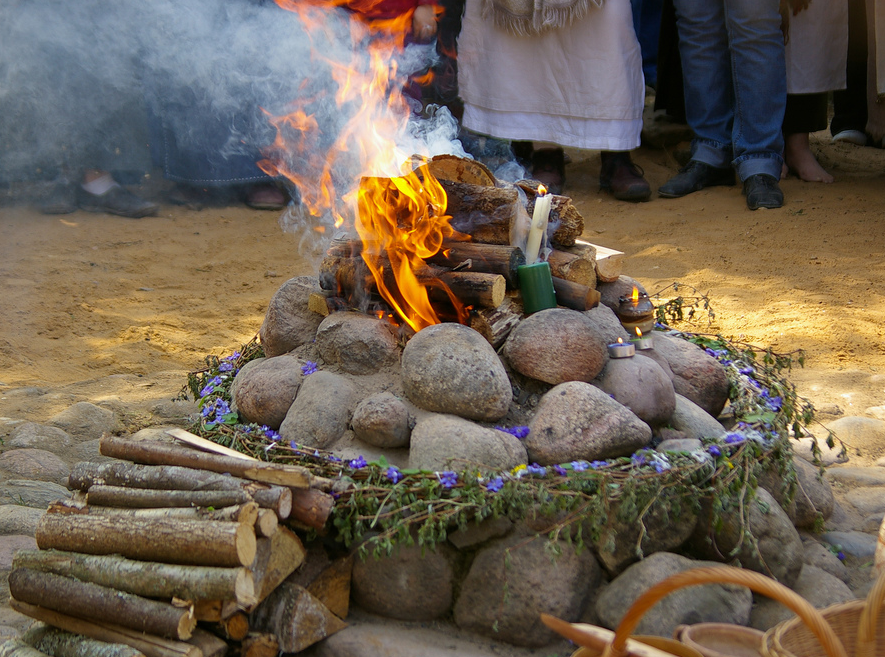
Fire altar or aukuras

The Baltic aukuras or "fire altar" is a stone altar in which a fire is ritually lit. Participants wash their hands and face before approaching the aukuras, and then they sing songs or ritual hymns as the fire is lit. Food, drink, grasses, and flowers are offered to the flame as the group sings the dainas. After the primary offering, participants offer their own verbal or silent prayers which are carried to the Gods with the smoke and sparks of the flame.

A Romuva priest is known as a vaidila (plural vaidilos), and a Romuva priestess is known as a vaidilutė (plural vaidilutės). As a recognised figure of authority in his or her community, the priest must have the proper skills and knowledge he or she needs to conduct religious ceremonies to honour the Gods.

A Romuva shrine is a field with one or several idols in front of a sacred fire where sacrifices are burned, known as an alka.

== Romuva centres ==
Samogitian Sanctuary was originally planned to be rebuilt on Birutė hill in Palanga but was not agreed to by the mayor of Palanga. Instead, it was built on a hill near Šventoji which also has 11 sculptures of polytheistic gods. There are four main festivals in a year:

- 23 March – Vernal equinox
- 22 June – Summer solstice
- 23 September – Autumnal equinox
- 20 December – Winter solstice

== Relations with Hinduism ==
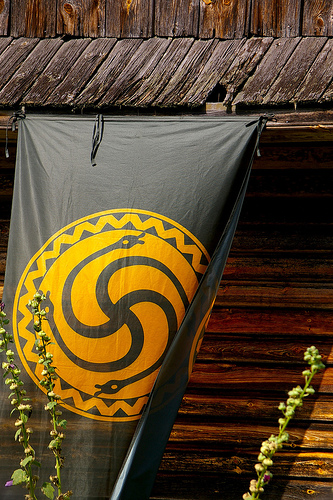
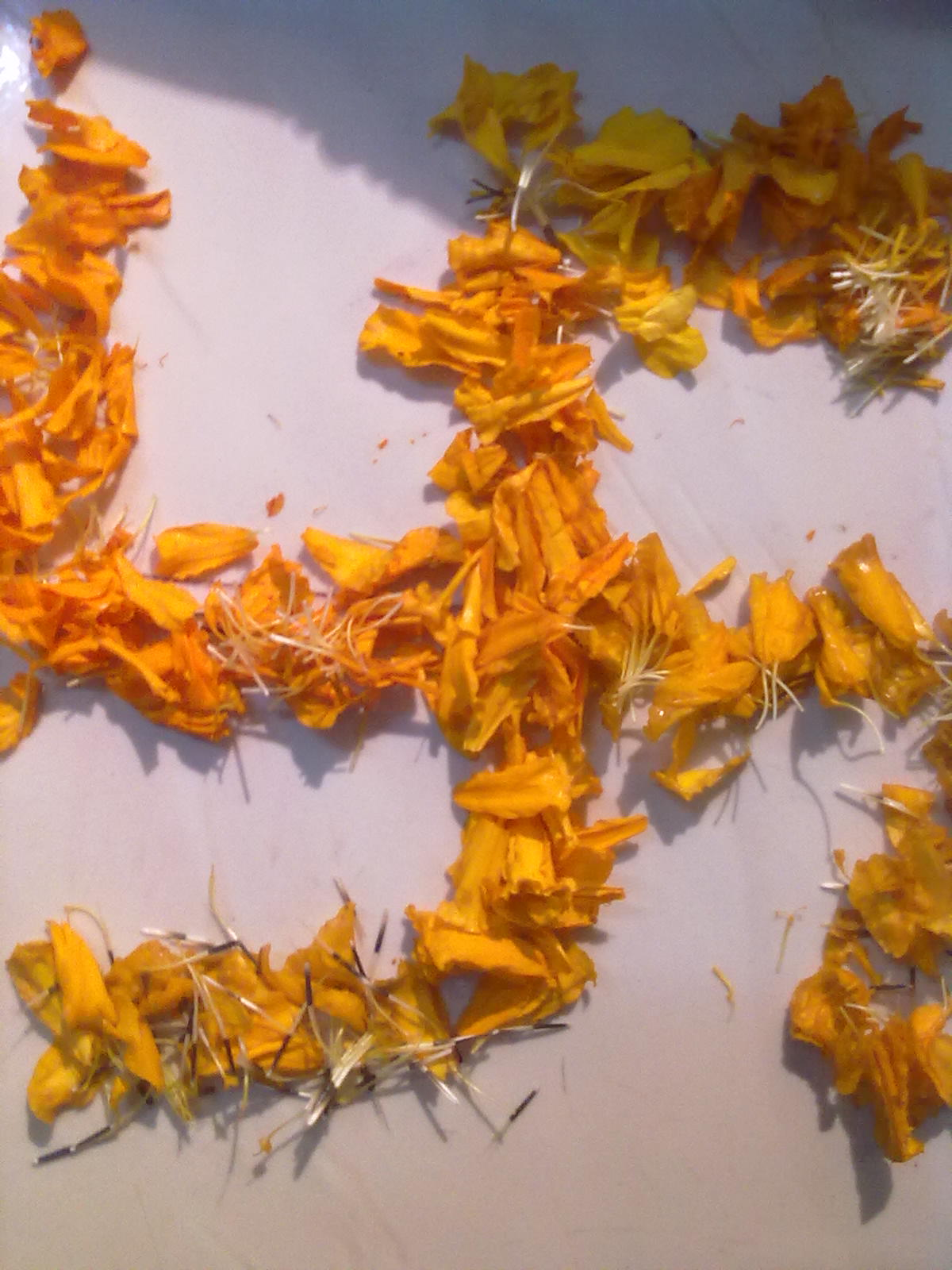
Similarities between Romuva flag (left) and Hindu Swastika symbol (right)

The Romuva religion is believed to share some similarities with Hinduism. For example, in Lithuanian, the word darna means harmony and coherence, and for Lithuanian polytheists, that is a religious tenet as well – the balance of the world. It also closely resembles the word dharma, Hinduism's cosmic order. There is linguistic similarity between darna and dharma. Some scholars say the two share an etymology, pointing to a common Indo-European connection. For Lithuania's Romuva community, which traces its traditions back to ancient folklore, it is evidence of a connection to India, Hinduism and Sanskrit that has become a part of their Romuva identity, along with its pantheon of gods and polytheistic rituals. Specifically, fire-centred rituals, which are also important in Hinduism.

Jonas Trinkūnas, a leading founder and priest of modern-day Romuva, performed marriages in the same manner as Hindu Vedic weddings. Mantras and chants were recited and the couple took vows after doing rounds of the fire. Trinkūnas further claimed that Rajputs were the ancestors of a Romuva tribe that once ruled Lithuania for many years and some of their ancient practices are practiced today.

Similarly Ašvieniai are divine twins in the Lithuanian mythology, counterparts of Vedic Ashvins. The Ašvieniai are represented as pulling a carriage of Saulė (the Sun) through the sky. Ašvieniai, depicted as žirgeliai or little horses, are common motifs on Lithuanian rooftops.

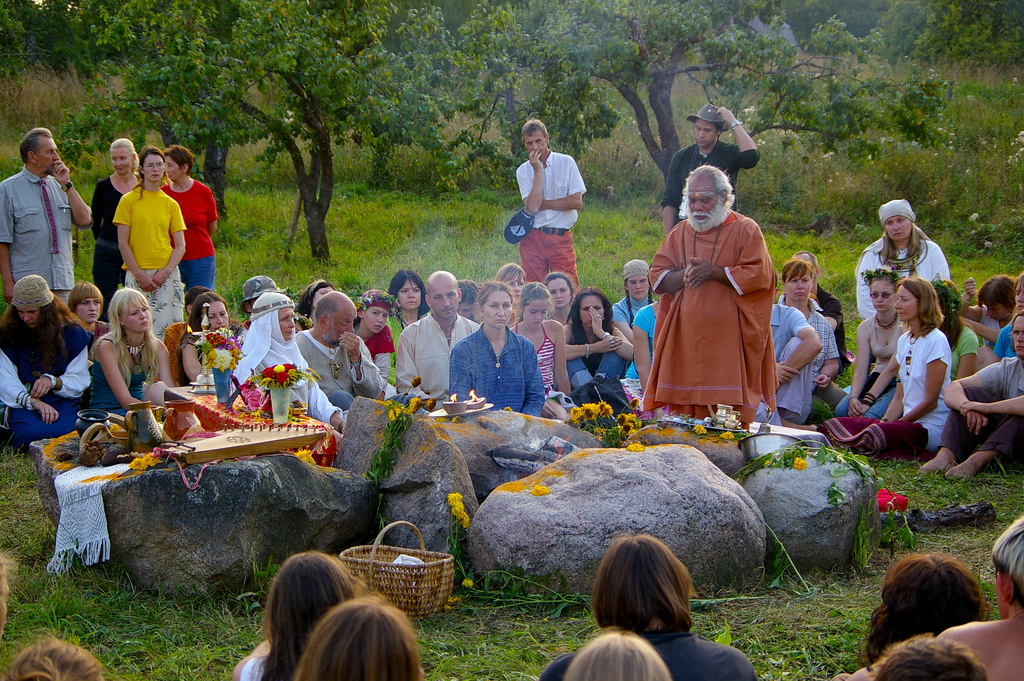
A Hindu priest officiating a Romuva ritual

Romuva and Hindu groups have come together on numerous occasions to share prayers and participate in dialogue. These events have taken place in Lithuania, Atlantic City, New Jersey, Boston, Massachusetts, Epping, New Hampshire, and elsewhere.

== See also ==
Historical background

- Baltic polytheistic religion
- Lithuanian mythology
- List of Lithuanian gods

Other polytheistic movements

- Dievturība – Latvian
- Rodnovery – Slavic
- European Congress of Ethnic Religions
