= Vėlinės =

Day of remembrance

Vėlinės or Ilgės, is the day of remembrance and honoring of the dead in Lithuania. It is celebrated on November 2 (All Souls' Day in the Catholic liturgy).

It is often merged with All Saints' Day (Lat. Commemoratio Omnium Fidelium Defunctorum), celebrated on November 1.

Traditionally, this holiday is celebrated by going to mass, and visiting the graves of the dead.

== History ==
Prayer for the dead as a community began in at least the 4th century in Lithuania.

The original holiday honoring the dead was called Ilgės. After Lithuania's Christianization around the 13th century, it became known as Vėlinės, which is analogous to All Soul's Day.

== Customs ==
Celebrations of All Souls' Day traditionally include going to morning and evening mass. After mass, the congregation goes on a procession that ends in the cemetery, where they offer prayers to the dead.

In traditional Lithuanian culture, it was believed that ghosts gathered in graves, on top of crosses, and in trees in the cemeteries. The celebrations to honor the dead took place in the cemetery so that the living could commune with their dead loved ones.

Traditional ways of celebrating Ilgės included sitting by the graves of relatives and sharing food with anyone in need. In some places in Lithuania, food was left on the graves of the dead as an offering overnight and food was distributed to people on All Saints' Day.

Starting in the 20th century, people began to light candles and leave them on graves of loved ones to celebrate Vėlinės. It is also common to tidy up the areas around graves and decorate them with flowers. Traditions of caring for graves extends beyond family connection: it is common for Lithuanians to tidy up the graves of strangers in honor of this holiday.
