= Mėnuo Juodaragis =

- Festival logo
- Genre: alternative music, folk music, experimental music
- Dates: Last weekend of August
- Locations: Verbiškės, Molėtai District, Lithuania (1995; 1997; 1999); Sudeikiai, Utena District, Lithuania (2000–2002); Kernavė, Širvintos District, Lithuania (2003–2005); Zarasas, Zarasai District, Lithuania (2007–2009); Aukštadvaris, Trakai District, Lithuania (2010); Zarasas, Zarasai District, Lithuania (2011–2013); Skinderiškis Dendrological Park, Kėdainiai District, Lithuania (2014); Zarasas, Zarasai District, Lithuania (2015); Duburys, Zarasai District, Lithuania (2016–2017); Molavėnai Castle Mounds, Raseiniai District, Lithuania (2018); Duburys, Zarasai District, Lithuania (2020); Grybai Manor, Švenčionys District, Lithuania (2021); Duburys, Zarasai District, Lithuania (2022–2024)
- Years active: 1995, 1997, 1999–2005, 2007–2018; 2020–2024
- Founders: "Dangus" and "Baltijos Griaustinis"
- Attendance: 5,000–6,000 people
- Website: mjr.lt/en/

Mėnuo Juodaragis (English: Black-Horned Moon or Moon of the Black Horn, sometimes abbreviated as BHM (MJR)) was an annual Baltic culture, alternative music, folk music, and experimental music festival organized in Lithuania. It ran from 1995 to 2024, and was visited by 5,000 to 6,000 people each year, making it one of the biggest and oldest festivals in Lithuania.

The festival's programme included lectures by folklorists and historians, workshops and demonstrations by artisans (blacksmiths, leatherworkers, weavers, jewellers, dyers, and others), traditional rites, historical reenactments, art exhibitions, film screenings, hikes, sports competitions, and folk dancing.

== History ==
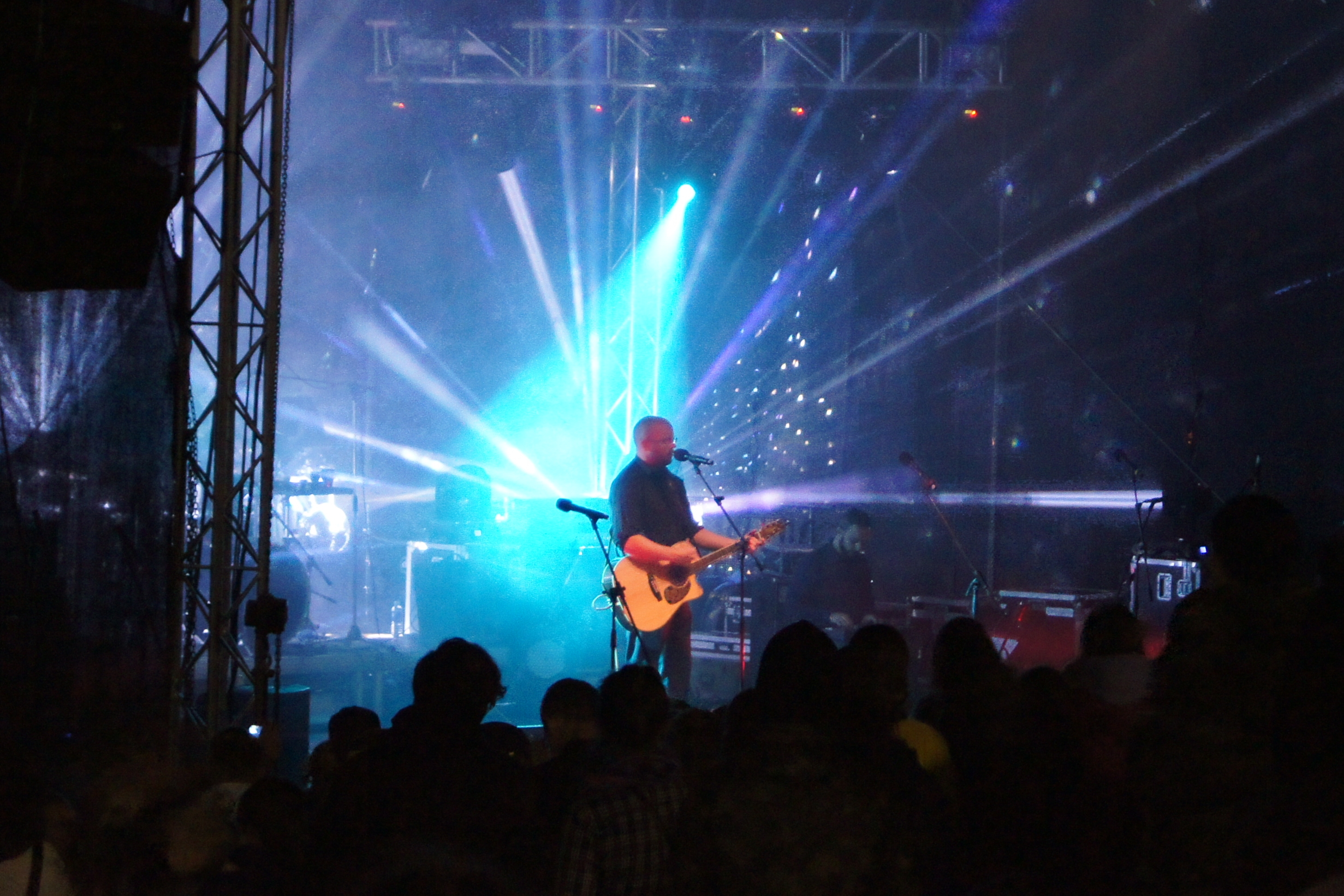
Experimental neofolk act Rome performing on the Mėnuo Juodaragis Big stage in 2013

The festival was initiated in 1997 as a spontaneous one-day gathering of several young people and their friends in Verbiškės village, Molėtai District, Lithuania, where it was organized biennially until 1999.

The festival later moved to Sudeikiai, a settlement near Utena town, where it took place from 2000 to 2002. Since then the timing of the festival also became fixed on the last weekend of August. Then in 2003–2005, Mėnuo Juodaragis was held in Kernavė, the medieval capital of the Grand Duchy of Lithuania. After a break in 2006 for financial and organisational reasons, the festival chose an island in Zarasas in Zarasai town as the location for the 2007 festival.

In 2011 Mėnuo Juodaragis returned to Zarasas and the 12th festival was dedicated to sutartinės, Lithuanian ancient polyphonic singing. The theme of the 13th festival in 2012 was birds and aviation and it was once again organized on an island in Zarasas. An air balloon race was held during the festival, as well as a nighttime balloon parade.

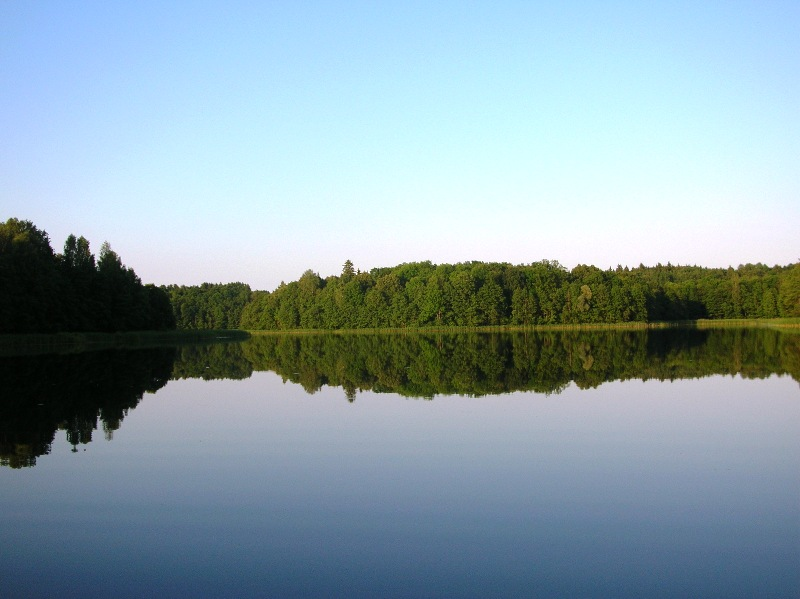
Island in Duburys where the festival took place in 2016, 2017 and 2020.

The 14th Mėnuo Juodaragis was dedicated to Latvians, the other surviving Baltic people, and the unity of Baltic people, featuring an extensive list of Latvian bands, such as Iļģi, Auļi, Skyforger, Vilki, Grodi and Dzelzs Vilks, as well as Latvian artisans and lecturers.

The main theme of the 19th festival in 2016 was "Home", according to the organizers not only in the physical sense but also in a spiritual meaning. That year Mėnuo Juodaragis took place on an island in Duburys, Zarasai District and the headliner was Slovenian avant-garde music group Laibach.

The 20th edition of Mėnuo Juodaragis returned to the island in Duburys. The festival was dedicated to Baltic god of thunder Perkūnas and was headlined by Nordic folk music group Wardruna.

The 21st edition of Mėnuo Juodaragis in 2018 took place at the complex of Molavėnai Castle Mounds. In early 2019 the organizers announced an interlude and that the next festival would be held from 27 to 30 of August 2020. 2024 was the final year the festival took place.

== Organisers and supporters ==
Mėnuo Juodaragis was organised by the Lithuanian record label Dangus and non-profit public institution "Baltijos Griaustinis". Since 2002, the festival was partially supported by the Ministry of Culture of the Republic of Lithuania, as well as the Department of UNESCO Cultural Management at Vilnius Academy of Arts, other cultural institutions, enterprises, media channels, and private persons.

== List of festivals ==
Festival	Year	Date	Location	Theme	Musicians
Mėnuo Juodaragis XXI¾	2021	August 20–22	Grybai Manor, Švenčionys District, Lithuania	Ragutis	Lithuania: Aiste Smilgevičiūte and Skylė, Andaja, Arklio Galia, Atalyja, Aurum Miles: Saulius Spindi – In Memoriam, Dónis with Žemyna, Elnio Rago Miškas, Gyvata, Gyvos Šventovės, Judu, Kaimynai, Kamanių šilelis, Kašėta Rokas, Kūlgrinda, Laiminguo, Lakiūtė, Lapkričio dvidešimtosios orkestras, Luctus, Magyla, Plieninės Varlės, Robaksai, Skeldos, Smetonos Ūsai, Sraigės Efektas, Šarqs, Tankuojis, Tykumos, Ugniavijas, Ūkanose, Vėjopatis, Vėlių Namai, Vilkduja.
Mėnuo Juodaragis XXI¾	2021	August 20–22	Grybai Manor, Švenčionys District, Lithuania	Ragutis	From other countries: Auļi (Latvia), Club Alpino (Poland), Forndom (Sweden), Krauka (Denmark), Ifriqiyya électrique (Tunisia), Rāva (Latvia).
MJR Kaukynes XXI½	2020	August 27–30	Duburys, Zarasai District, Lithuania	Kaukas and masks (kaukės)	Lithuania: Baltos varnos, Dancing Crow, Daumatas ir grupė, Girnų Giesmės, Fume, Juodvarnis, Intakas, Kamanių šilelis, K6RDZ9, Kūlgrinda, Lietis, M. Briedžio grupė, Oorchach, Patrimas, Poliarizuoti stiklai, Ramėja, Saulius Spindi, Siela, Smetonos ūsai, Solo Ansamblis, Šarūnas Mačiulis, Šeiva, Tankuojis, Tylios šventovės, Tiese, Ugniavijas, Virginija Pievos, Vejdas, Virsmai, Zarasų mandolininkai, DJ Žuvininkas, DJ Smetona, DJ Neofolk, DJs Į_DUBA SELECTA.
MJR Kaukynes XXI½	2020	August 27–30	Duburys, Zarasai District, Lithuania	Kaukas and masks (kaukės)	From other countries: Rāva (Latvia), Jāņoga (Latvia), Brička (Latvia), Vilki (Latvia), Krauka (Denmark), Kallomäki (Finland); Sturle Dagsland (Norway), Crooked Mouth (Canada); Meszecsinka (Hungary).
Mėnuo Juodaragis XXI	2018	August 24–26	Molavėnai Castle Mounds, Raseiniai District, Lithuania	Magic (Burtai)	Lithuania: Aidai Ataidi, Andaja, AM X VV, Arbata, Arklio Galia, Daina Dieva, Daiva Šeškauskaitė-Skalsa, Driezhas, Elnio Rago Miškas, Esatis, Gilė, Gintas Mocevičius, Girių Dvasios, Girjaukis, Kiti kambariai, Kūlgrinda, MERGICOS+, NuliS:S:S:S, Obelija, OBŠRR, Paliekant Žemę, Raguvos, Saulius Spindi, Sen Svaja, Skeldos, Ugniavijas, Undan, Ūkanose, Vadauja, Vėlių Namai, Virginija, Vilkduja, DJ Inkilas, DJ Iduba Selecta with the team
Mėnuo Juodaragis XXI	2018	August 24–26	Molavėnai Castle Mounds, Raseiniai District, Lithuania	Magic (Burtai)	From other countries: Alash (Russia), Aurinkopyörä (Finland), Dandelion Wine (Australia), Ēnu kaleidoskops (Latvia), Heilung (Denmark), Kellan (Prussia), Meta Meat (France), Pragnavit (Belarus), Sangre de Muerdago (Spain), Romowe Rikoito (Prussia), Romuvos (Israel)
Mėnuo Juodaragis XX	2017	August 24–27	Duburys, Zarasai District, Lithuania	Perkūnas	Lithuania: Atalyja, Aušrela, DJs Baltic Balkan, Donis and Rasa Serra, Girjaukis, Gyvata, Algirdas Klova, Nahash, Oorchach, Domantas Razauskas and VOS VOS, Solo Ansamblis, Thundertale, Ugniavijas, Vėjopatis, Wejdas u.c.
Mėnuo Juodaragis XX	2017	August 24–27	Duburys, Zarasai District, Lithuania	Perkūnas	From other countries: Auļi & Tautumeitas (Latvia), Aurinkopyörä (Finland), Daba San (Latvia), Death in Rome (European Union), Der Blutharsch and the Infinite Church of the Leading Hand (Austria), DrymbaDaDzyga (Ukraine), Elle Márjá Eira (Norway), Hipstokrātija (Latvia), Irdorath (Belarus), Karolina Cicha & Bart Pałyga (Poland), Nest (Finland), Niel Mitra (Germany), Of the Wand and the Moon (Denmark), Selvans (Italy), Vril Jäger (United Kingdom/Denmark), Wardruna (Norway).
Mėnuo Juodaragis XIX	2016	August 25–28	Duburys, Zarasai District, Lithuania	Home (Namai)	Lithuania: Adas ir Viltė, Aidi ataidi, Afrikos būgnai, M.Briedis and the band, Dambras, Esatis, Fume, Garbanotas Bosistas, Gilė, Girių Dvasios, I.V.T.K.Y.G.Y.G., Juodvarnis, Antanas Kirvelevičius, Korys, Kūlgrinda, Lakiūtė, Liberte, Luctus, McKaras, Nulis:S:S:S, Obšrr, N.Pečiūra ir Fantomai, Pievos, Poringė, Ramtatūris, Rana, Sedula, Sen Svaja, Sheep Got Waxed, Siela, Aistė Smilgevičiūtė and Skylė, Solo Ansamblis, Sraigės Efektas, Tatato projektas, Tiese, Ugniavijas, Ūkanose, Vada-patha-sammelana, Vėtra Trinkūnaitė, Vėlių Namai, Vilkduja, Vilko Pupos, Virsmai, Vyčinai, Žalvarinis, Žemyna, DJ Patricia Kokett, DJ Sagam.
Mėnuo Juodaragis XIX	2016	August 25–28	Duburys, Zarasai District, Lithuania	Home (Namai)	From other countries: Alio Die (Italy), Gas of Latvia (Latvia), Hexvessel (Finland), Keltika Hispanna (Spain), Laibach (Slovenia), Piarevaracien (Belarus), Puuluup (Estonia), Romowe Rikoito (Prussia), Saucējas (Latvia), Theodor Bastard (Russia).
Mėnuo Juodaragis XVIII	2015	August 28–30	Duburys, Zarasai District, Lithuania	Bees (Bitės)	Lithuania: Thundertale, Nojus, Ne_, I.V.T.K.Y.G.Y.G., Angis, Kūlgrinda, Atalyja, Obelija, Seluona, Raguvos, Tykiai, Ramtatūris, Undan, Rugiaveidė ir šeima, Marga muzika, Mindrė, Ugniavijas, Esatis, Kamanių šilelis, Turbo diedukai, Jonas ir Ieva, Briedis Mindaugas, Baltos varnos, Alina Orlova, Domantas Razauskas and the band, Sauliaus Petreikio Orkestras, Veronika Povilionienė and Robertas Semeniukas, Sen Svaja, Andaja, Vilkduja, OBšRR, Sala, Vėjopatis, McKaras, Daina Dieva, Skeldos, Gys, Girių dvasios, Sala, Sraunus, Nulis:S:S:S, Driezhas, DJs Baltic Balkan, DJ Aerobica, DJ Žuvininkas.
Mėnuo Juodaragis XVIII	2015	August 28–30	Duburys, Zarasai District, Lithuania	Bees (Bitės)	From other countries: Sol Invictus (United Kingdom), Shadow Biosphere (United Kingdom), Gods Tower (Belarus), Sangre de Muerdago (Spain), Vassvik (Spain), La Chiva Gantiva (Belgium/Colombia), Kirlian Camera (Italy), Asea Sool (Georgia), Atmasfera (Georgia), Troitsa (Belarus), The Devil & The Universe (Austria), Zāle (Latvia).
Mėnuo Juodaragis XVII	2014	August 28–30	Skinderiškis Dendrological Park, Kėdainiai District, Lithuania	Dreams (Sapnai)	Lithuania: Merope, Essa, Auštaras, Budrūs, Daina Dieva, Donis, Driezhas, Gilė, Girių Dvasios, Gyvata, Juodvarnis, Kfg-Pulkelis, Korys, Kūlgrinda, Lela Menelia, Lygaudė, Lys, Mano Juodoji Sesuo, McKaras, Miglaukas, Nyksta, Obšrr, Oorchach, Pievos, Rana, Sala, Shnare.Sys, Skeldos, Smilgelė, Somnambula, Spanxti, Tegu Teka, Trys Keturiose, Ugniavijas, Virsmai, Vytautas Landsbergis, Wejdas, Žiedupė, Dj Eirimas Velička, Dj Plix, Dj Paulius Ilius, Dj Do, Dj Shn (Minimal.Lt).
Mėnuo Juodaragis XVII	2014	August 28–30	Skinderiškis Dendrological Park, Kėdainiai District, Lithuania	Dreams (Sapnai)	From other countries: Frailty (Latvia), Sieben (United Kingdom), And Also The Trees (United Kingdom), Krauka (Denmark), Ô Paradis (Spain).
Mėnuo Juodaragis XVI	2013	August 23–25	Zarasas, Zarasai District, Lithuania	Brothers Latvians (Broliai latviai)	Lithuania: Aistė Smilgevičiūtė and Skylė, Baltos Varnos, Bruzgynai, Domantas Razauskas with the band, Donis, Čiūtyta, Garsinė Izoliacija, Gilė, Girnų Giesmės, Justina Mileškaitė, Liepaitės, Kabg Čiutyta, Kūjeliai Kūlgrinda, Laukis, Marga Muzika, Midula, Obšrr, Obtest, Pievos, Ratilai, Sen Svaja, Siela, Skeldos, Spanxti, Sraigės Efektas, Ugniavijas, Vėjopatis, Vėlių Namai, Vilkduja.
Mėnuo Juodaragis XVI	2013	August 23–25	Zarasas, Zarasai District, Lithuania	Brothers Latvians (Broliai latviai)	From other countries: Auļi (Latvia), Bēdu vēstnesis (Latvia), Changes (USA), Dzelzs Vilks (Latvia), Ēnu kaleidoskops (Latvia), Fire+Ice (United Kingdom), Folknery (Ukraine), Green Novice (Latvia), Grodi (Latvia), Iļģi (Latvia), Miglas asni (Latvia), Rome (Luxembourg), Otava Yo (Russia), STandART (Latvia), Silent Stream of Godless Elegy (Czech Republic), Vilki (Latvia).
Mėnuo Juodaragis XV	2012	August 24–26	Zarasas, Zarasai District, Lithuania	Birds (paukščiai) and history of Lithuanian aviation (Lietuvos aviacijos istorija)	Lithuania: Aistė Smilgevičiūtė and Skylė, Alina Orlova, Andrjus Mamontovs, ByTikZyz, Daina Dieva, Donis, Driezhas, Flesh Flash, Gastauta, Girnų Giesmės, Gyvata, Juodvarnis, Kamanių šilelis, Kreizas, Kūlgrinda, Lapot, Linago, Mindrauja, Obelija, Oorchach, Ramtatūris, Rumunija, Sala, Sen Svaja, Ugniavijas, VISI, Veronika Povilionienė, Vydraga, Vytautas V. Landsbergis, Žalvarinis.
Mėnuo Juodaragis XV	2012	August 24–26	Zarasas, Zarasai District, Lithuania	Birds (paukščiai) and history of Lithuanian aviation (Lietuvos aviacijos istorija)	From other countries: Ataraxia (Italy), Cruachan (Ireland), DakhaBrakha (Ukraine), H a t i (Poland), Larrnakh (Hungary), Svjata Vatra (Estonia), Tharaphita (Estonia), Theodor Bastard (Russia), Troum (Germany), Vējam kabatā (Latvia), Vietah (Belarus).
Mėnuo Juodaragis XIV	2011	August 26–28	Zarasas, Zarasai District, Lithuania	Sutartinės and the revival of Lithuanian language (lietuvių kalbos atgimimas)	Lithuania: Aistė Smilgevičiūtė and Skylė, Atalyja, BIX, Devyni, Donis, d.n.s, Dijūta, Golden Parazyth, Girių Dvasios, Juodvarnis, Kamanių Šilelis, Kukumbalis, Kūlgrinda, Lygaudė, Luctus, Luum, Marga Muzika, Nefes, OBšRR, PB8, Pievos, Spanxti, Seluona, Trys Keturiose, Ugniavijas, Ukmergės ir Pasvalio dambrelininkai, Vilkduja.
Mėnuo Juodaragis XIV	2011	August 26–28	Zarasas, Zarasai District, Lithuania	Sutartinės and the revival of Lithuanian language (lietuvių kalbos atgimimas)	From other countries: Arnica (Spain), Blood Axis (USA), Dazkarieh (Portugal), Laimas Muzykanti (Latvia), Południca (Poland), Rapoon (United Kingdom), Taruta (Ukraine), Troll Bends Fir (Russia), Sonne Hagal (Germany), DJ Olivers (Latvia).
Mėnuo Juodaragis XIII	2010	August 27–28	Aukštadvaris, Trakai District, Lithuania	Mythology of the Baltic Devil (baltiškoji Velnio mitologija) and Dr. Jonas Basanavičius	Lithuania: Aistvara, Ataka, Atalyja, Ataka, Delchia, Donis with Rasa Serra, Gyvata, Goštauta, Karužė, Katedra, Kūlgrinda, Liberte, Lipk ant sienų, Lys, Marga Muzika, Oorchach, Pergalė, Pievos, Poccolus, Sedula, Ugniavijas, Ukmergės ir Pasvalio dambrelininkai, Verknė, Vydraga, Wejdas su Driezhas.
Mėnuo Juodaragis XIII	2010	August 27–28	Aukštadvaris, Trakai District, Lithuania	Mythology of the Baltic Devil (baltiškoji Velnio mitologija) and Dr. Jonas Basanavičius	From other countries: Auļi (Latvia), Ēnu kaleidoskops (Latvia), Skyforger (Latvia), Sol Invictus (United Kingdom), Tabor Radosti (Czech Republic), Viy (Ukraine), Żywiołak (Poland).
Mėnuo Juodaragis XII	2009	August 28–30	Zarasas, Zarasai District, Lithuania	Horses (žirgai), Vytis and history of Lithuaniaolder than 1000 years (Lietuvos istorija senesnė nei 1000 metų)	Lithuania: Aistė Smilgevičūtė and Skylė, Ale Va, Andaja, Brėkšta, Delchia, Donis and Rasa Serra, d.n.s, Driezhas, Girnų Giesmės, Goštauta, Karas, Karužė, Katedra, Kolektyvas, Kūlgrinda, Liepaitės, Mckaras, Mindrauja, Nüm Nüm, Oorchach, Patris, Ramtatūris, Sadūnai, Shnaresys, Spanxti, Tylos Labanoro with Veronika Povilionienė, Ugniavijas, Vilkduja, Wejdas.
Mėnuo Juodaragis XII	2009	August 28–30	Zarasas, Zarasai District, Lithuania	Horses (žirgai), Vytis and history of Lithuaniaolder than 1000 years (Lietuvos istorija senesnė nei 1000 metų)	From other countries: Baobabs (Latvia), Bisclaveret (Poland), Dandelion Wine (Austria), Inkubus Sukkubus (United Kingdom), Irfan (Bulgaria), Litvintroll (Belarus), Of the Wand and the Moon (Denmark), Rama Amor (Italy), Rasa Basom (Lithuania/Norway), Trokšņu iela (Latvia), Virre+ (Estonia), Irakli Koiava (Georgia), Žemės garsas (Georgia/Lithuania).
Mėnuo Juodaragis XI	2008	August 22–24	Zarasas, Zarasai District, Lithuania	Aitvarai and the 90th anniversary of the Lithuanian Army (Lietuvos kariuomenės 90-metis)	Lithuania: Aistė Smilgevičūtė and Skylė, Andaja, Andrius Mamontovas, Atalyja, Brėkšta, Donis, Driezhas, Gąstauta, Girnų Giesmės, Kūlgrinda, Lipk Ant Sienų, Lys, Obšrr, Obtest, Pievos, Ramtatūris, Spanxti, Vilkduja, Vydraga, Vytis, Viksva, Wejdas, Žolynas, Žvaigždumėnija.
Mėnuo Juodaragis XI	2008	August 22–24	Zarasas, Zarasai District, Lithuania	Aitvarai and the 90th anniversary of the Lithuanian Army (Lietuvos kariuomenės 90-metis)	From other countries: Auļi (Latvia), Essa (Bulgaria), Loits (Estonia), Rose Rovine E Amanti (Italy), Spiritual Front (Italy), Sieben (Ukraine), Theodor Bastard (Russia), Vihr (Russia), Von Thronstahl (Germany).
Mėnuo Juodaragis X	2007	August 24–26	Zarasas, Zarasai District, Lithuania	Selonian tribe (Sėlių gentis) and Moon (Mėnulis)	Lithuania: Atalyja, Donis, Kūlgrinda, Žalvarinis, Pievos, Lauxna Lauksna, Girnų Giesmės, Wejdas, Mckaras, Andaja, Thundertale, Alina Orlova, Driezhas, Svefn-G-Englar, Spookshow Inc., Vilkduja, Dvi Mudvi, Lipk Ant Sienų, Brėkšta, Seluona, Liberte. DJs: Infarktas, Android, Leibstandarte, Smetona, Hematogenas, Neofolk, Alex, Frau Cass.
Mėnuo Juodaragis X	2007	August 24–26	Zarasas, Zarasai District, Lithuania	Selonian tribe (Sėlių gentis) and Moon (Mėnulis)	From other countries: Allerseelen (Austria), Ēnu kaleidoskops (Latvia), DJ Metalmanik (United Kingdom), Moon Far Away (Russia), DJ Ruta (Latvia), Svarrogh (Bulgaria), The Moon and the Nightspirit (Hungary), Vilki (Latvia).
Mėnuo Juodaragis IX	2005	August 26–28	Kernavė, Širvintos District, Lithuania	Vydūnas and the Baltic ecology (baltiška ekologija)	Lithuania: Aistė Smilgevičūtė and Skylė, Kūlgrinda, Šova, Donis, Wejdas, Girnų Giesmės, Sala, Sovijus, Lauxna Lauksna, Goetheanum, Ensemble SP, GyS, Drama, Andaja, Driezhas, Pievos, Linoja, Dvi Mudvi; DJs: Android, Daimon, Hematogenas, Smetona, Neofolk, Plix.
Mėnuo Juodaragis IX	2005	August 26–28	Kernavė, Širvintos District, Lithuania	Vydūnas and the Baltic ecology (baltiška ekologija)	From other countries: Älymystö (Finland), Hybryds (Belgium), Kratong (Russia), Romowe Rikoito (Prussia), Neverdice (Finland), The Fungal Kingdom (USA).
Mėnuo Juodaragis IIX	2004	August 27–29	Kernavė, Širvintos District, Lithuania	Secrets of Kernavė (Kernavės paslaptys) and the ancient Baltic signs (senieji baltų ženklai)	Lithuania: Agyria, Angis, Antigonė, Atalyja, A20D, Donis, Gintas K, Girnų Giesmės, iTi, Kūlgrinda, Lauxna Lauksna, Liberte, Mano Juodoji Sesuo, McKaras, Šova, Trys Keturiose, Verdingis, D. ir E. Vyčinai, Wejdas, Žvaigždumėnija. DJs: Android, Plaksa, Chimera, No. Thing, Neofolk, Arlequin.
Mėnuo Juodaragis IIX	2004	August 27–29	Kernavė, Širvintos District, Lithuania	Secrets of Kernavė (Kernavės paslaptys) and the ancient Baltic signs (senieji baltų ženklai)	From other countries: Allerseelen (Austria), Cawatana (Hungary), Lahka Muza (Slovakia), Skyforger (Latvia), Sui Generis Umbra (Poland), Job Karma (Poland), DJ Audio Head Cleaner (France), DJ De’Ath (United Kingdom), DJ Sinusoida Squad (Poland), DJ Lil & Em (Poland), DJ Olivers (Latvia).
Mėnuo Juodaragis VII	2003	August 22–24	Kernavė, Širvintos District, Lithuania	Lithuanian partisans (Lietuvos partizanai)	Lithuania: Agyria, Andaja, Ataka, Dijūta, Donis, Driezhas, Girnų Giesmės, Goštauta, Indie, Kūlgrinda, Lumotree, McKaras, Migloje, Notanga, Obtest, Planet Dogbone, Shnaresys, Siela, Šova, Trolis & The Giberlingers, Veronika Povilionienė and Valija, Verdingis, Vilkduja, Xess, Žvaigždumėnija. DJs: Android, Arlequin, Astralas, Chimera, Daimon, Elektra, Eteris, Maliboo, Neofolk, No. Thing, Pagalve.
Mėnuo Juodaragis VII	2003	August 22–24	Kernavė, Širvintos District, Lithuania	Lithuanian partisans (Lietuvos partizanai)	From other countries: Auļi (Latvia), DJ Audio Head Cleaner (France), DJ Bongirl (Estonia), Deathcamp Project (Poland), DJ De’Ath (United Kingdom), Forgotten Sunrise (Estonia), DJ Audio Head Cleaner (France), DJ De’Ath (United Kingdom), DJ Leszek (Poland), Markuch (Poland), DJ Ment (Latvia), DJ Olivers (Latvia), Osimira (Belarus), Skon (Poland), Temple Of Tiermes (Finland), Visi Vēji (Latvia), DJ Velnaruna (Latvia), DJ 4-got-10 (Estonia).
Mėnuo Juodaragis VI	2002	August 23–25	Sudeikiai, Utena District, Lithuania	—	Lithuania: Antigonė, Donis, Driezhas, Dumaz, Goštauta, Iti, Kūlgrinda, Nata, Rugiaveidė, Sedu, Shnaresys, Spanxti, Sugyvulinos Latakams, Trolis & The Giberlingers, Vilkduja, Xess, Žalvarinis, Žvaigždumėnija; DJs Android, Maliboo, Neofolk, Oysterova, Shock.
Mėnuo Juodaragis VI	2002	August 23–25	Sudeikiai, Utena District, Lithuania	—	From other countries: Eva (Poland), Rīsa zvejnieki (Latvia), Romowe Rikoito (Prussia), DJ Olivers (Latvia), DJ Vuguls (Latvia).
Mėnuo Juodaragis V	2001	August 24–26	Sudeikiai, Utena District, Lithuania	—	Lithuania: Accident, Anapilis, Artek, Donis, Girnų Giesmės, IKA-e, I.V.T.K.Y.G.Y.G., Algirdas Klova, Kopa, Kūlgrinda, McKaras, Notanga, Sedu, Shnaresys, Siela, CCA, Trolis and the Giberlingers, Ugnėlakis, dj Android.
Mėnuo Juodaragis V	2001	August 24–26	Sudeikiai, Utena District, Lithuania	—	From other countries: Forgotten Sunrise (Estonia), K984theFungalKingdom (United Kingdom), Skyforger (Latvia), Tiermes (Finland), 4got10 (Estonia).
Mėnuo Juodaragis IV	2000	August 25–27	Sudeikiai, Utena District, Lithuania	—	Lithuania: Donis, Girnų Giesmės, Zpoan Vtenz, Ugnėlakis, Kūlgrinda, Peorth, Sala, Nahash, McKaras, Griausmo Viešpačiai, IKA-e, Endiche vis.sat, Die In Trance, Evaldas Vyčinas and Daiva Vyčiniene, Gluodenas, Shnaresys, Sedu, Eudine Seythe.
Mėnuo Juodaragis III	1999	May 1	Sudeikiai, Utena District, Lithuania	—	Lithuania: Donis, Ugnėlakis, Memoria, Girnų Giesmės, ŠP, Zpoan Vtenz, Laumė, Sala, Peorth, Sedu, Gdae.
Mėnuo Juodaragis II	1997	May 2	Verbiškės, Molėtai District, Lithuania	—	Lithuania: Ha Lela, Angis, Sovijus, Sala, Pievos, Laumė, Akys, Wejdas.
Mėnuo Juodaragis II	1997	May 2	Verbiškės, Molėtai District, Lithuania	—	Latvia: King Lear's Convulsions.
Mėnuo Juodaragis I	1995	November 10	Verbiškės, Molėtai District, Lithuania	—	Lithuania: Wejdas, Solus, Akys, Sovijus, Sala.
