= Broliai =

Studio album by Skylė
- Released: November 2010
- Recorded: 2010, Via Artis
- Genres: Rock, neofolk
- Length: 78:33
- Language: Lithuanian
- Label: Via Artis

Skylė chronology
| Sapnų trofėjai (2009) | Broliai | Vilko vartai (2015) |

Broliai (Brothers) is an album by the Lithuanian band Skylė released in 2010. It is a concept album to commemorate the Lithuanian partisans who waged a guerrilla war in Lithuania against the Soviet Union in 1944–1953.

The album was released in two formats – regular digipak CD and a special edition in a fabric case with the embroidered band logo.

== History ==
The first concept was proposed to Rokas Radzevičius by Dalia Kuodytė, head of the Genocide and Resistance Research Centre of Lithuania. She suggested covering songs of the Lithuanian partisans. The diary of the partisan Lionginas Baliukevičius-Dzūkas was the inspiration to record a concept album as a commemoration and a sign of respect for the partisans.

A promotional limited edition publication containing two upcoming songs from the album – "Priesaika" and "Tėveli" – was released in 2009. The money received from the publication was used for the release of "Broliai". A vinyl version was released in 2018 to mark the centenary of the country's independence.

== Concept ==
The song "Karingei augo" contains a fragment of a sutartinė ("Augo karutis, karingei augo") which was written down in 1849 in Zarasai region, the melody of which did not survive. The songs "Nebelauki manęs" and "Neužmerk akių" contain authentic lyrics by two female partisans, Diana Glemžaitė and an unnamed partisan known as "Laukinukė" (wild girl). The lyrics of sutartinė used in "Tėveli" were written down in 1931 (sung by Antanas Sidabris from the village of Sidabrinė; the original melody did not survive). The first verse of "Dubysa" was taken from the poem "Laisvės ilgesys" by Aušrinė.

The album reflects on a story of one man: his life, love, the tragedy of his nation, farewell, retreat into the forest, life in hiding, betrayal, fear of death, etc. The song "Aštuoni karžygiai" is dedicated to the eight partisan leaders who gathered in the Prisikėlimas district (village of Minaičiai) in February 1949 and established the Union of Lithuanian Freedom Fighters. The song "Klajūnė" is dedicated to all the women who joined or otherwise assisted the partisan movement. The song "Paskutinė kulka" is dedicated to Lionginas Baliukevičius-Dzūkas, while "Broliai aitvarai" was inspired by the insights found in his diary on his brothers-in-arms who no longer feared death ("broliai, nugalėję mirtį", brothers who have defeated death).

== Track listing ==
The album was composed by Rokas Radzevičius, track 16 was composed in collaboration with Gediminas Žilius.

| No. | Title | Lyrics | Length |
|---|---|---|---|
| 1. | "Per Brolių galvas" | Milda Paškauskaitė | 3:22 |
| 2. | "Žalia daina" | Rimvydas Stankevičius | 4:21 |
| 3. | "Karingei augo" | Aistė Smilgevičiūtė | 3:43 |
| 4. | "Pinavija" | Rokas Radzevičius | 5:08 |
| 5. | "Kas gi paukštį nupraus?" | Aistė Smilgevičiūtė | 3:22 |
| 6. | "Stelmužė" | Rokas Radzevičius | 4:53 |
| 7. | "Aštuoni karžygiai" | Rokas Radzevičius | 4:58 |
| 8. | "Klajūnė" | Rokas Radzevičius | 5:07 |
| 9. | "Dubysa" | Aistė Smilgevičiūtė | 5:07 |
| 10. | "Nebelauki manęs" | Diana Glemžaitė | 4:21 |
| 11. | "Neužmerk akių" | Laukinukė | 3:12 |
| 12. | "Minutė prieš" | Rimvydas Stankevičius | 5:41 |
| 13. | "Paskutinė kulka" | Rokas Radzevičius | 4:50 |
| 14. | "Akmenų kareiviai" | Rokas Radzevičius | 1:21 |
| 15. | "Tėveli" | Sutartinė | 5:59 |
| 16. | "Rauda" | Gediminas Žilys | 4:04 |
| 17. | "Broliai aitvarai" | Rokas Radzevičius | 4:22 |
| 18. | "Priesaika" | Rimvydas Stankevičius | 4:27 |
| Total length: | | | 78:33 |

== Featured artists ==
Skylė:

- Aistė Smilgevičiūtė – vocals
- Rokas Radzevičius – vocals, acoustic guitar
- Mantvydas Kodis – keyboard, accordion
- Kęstutis Drazdauskas – lumzdelis, backing vocals
- Jonas Krivickas – electric guitar, backing vocals
- Gediminas Žilys – bass guitar, kanklės, jew's harp, backing vocals
- Salvijus Žeimys – drums

Guest musicians:

- Aurimas Maldūnas – backing vocals
- Mindaugas Savičenko – backing vocals
- Renuaras Krivelis – backing vocals
- Vytautas Bazaras – backing vocals
- Andrius Kulikauskas – arrangements for strings
- Vytautas Mikeliūnas – violin
- Ugnė Jauniškytė – violin
- Tomas Savickas – viola
- Onutė Švabauskaitė – cello
