= Theodor Bastard =

Russian band

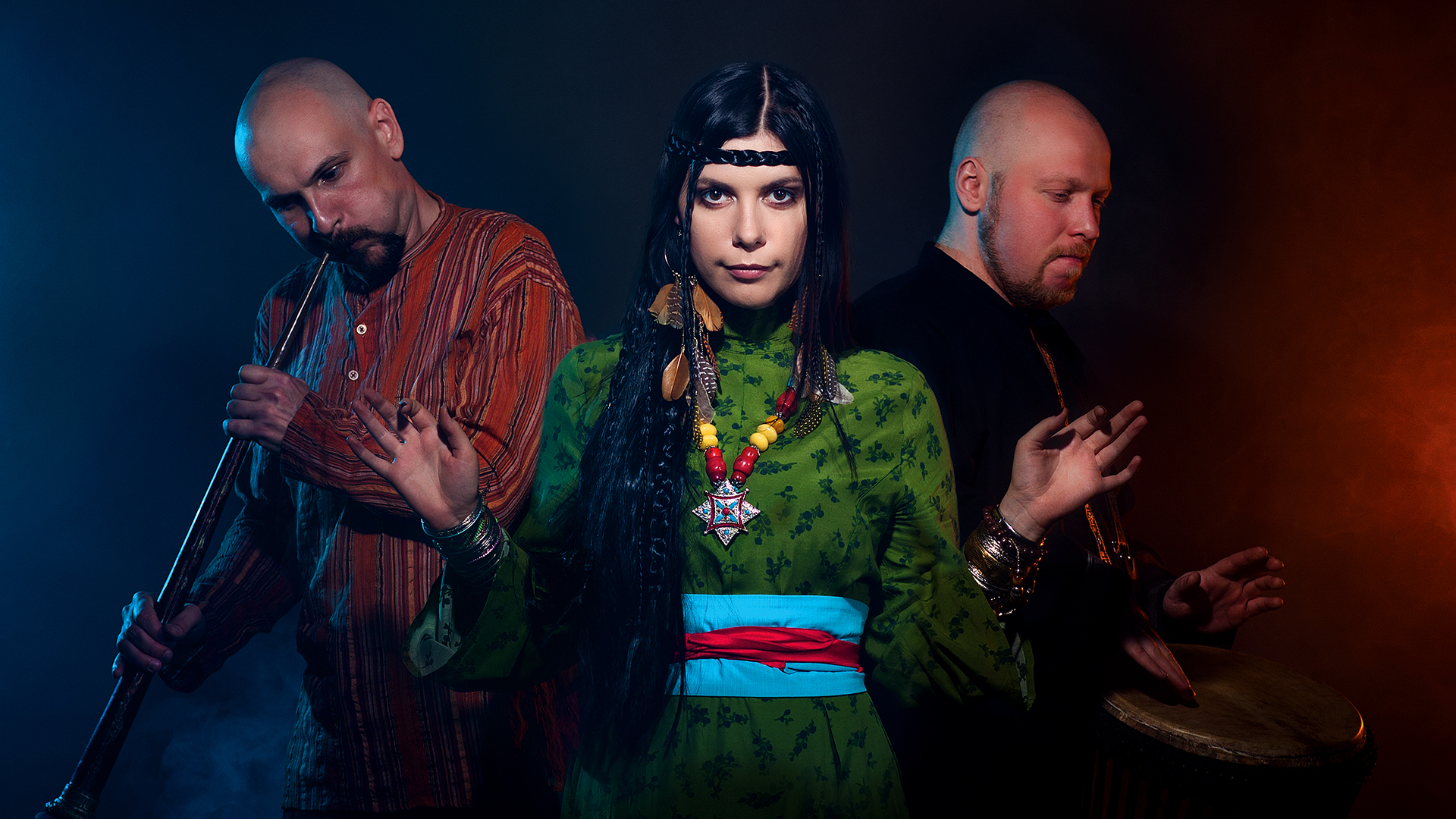

Background information
- Also known as: Фёдор Сволочь (Fedor Svolotch) (1995–1999)
- Origin: St Petersburg, Russia
- Genres: World music, dark wave, trip hop, neofolk, ambient
- Years active: 1999 – present
- Labels: Fulldozer Records, Q-Code Records, Planktone Productions, Species Of Fishes, Pandaimonium Records, The Art Records, Noise Kontrol, Muzikal Yapım, Manchester Files, Twilight Records, Theo Records, Danse Macabre Records, Season of Mist
- Members: Fedor Svolotch; Yana Veva; Kusas; Andy Vladych; Alexey Kalinovskiy; Vyacheslav Salikov; Ekaterina Dolmatova
- Past members: Taras "Monthy" Frolov; Max Kostyunin; Anton Urazov; Sergey Smirnov; Vyacheslav Nikiforov
- Website: theodorbastard.com

Theodor Bastard is a band from St Petersburg, Russia. Theodor Bastard were pioneers of world and neofolk music genres in Russia. Also elements of dark wave, trip hop and ambient are present in the band's music. The themes of band's songs are very far from everyday problems, they are based on mythology and fantasy. The hallmark of the band is a female vocal by Yana Veva – the lead vocalist and author of many songs. She often sings in idiosyncratic language invented by her and in rare languages ranging from African and Asian to Native American and many more. Theodor Bastard albums were released in 5 countries: Russia, Germany, Turkey, Mexico, Argentina.

Theodor Bastard's musicians use classical instruments: cello, harp as well as electronic instruments: synthesizers, samplers, theremin and ethnic instruments: nyckelharpa, jouhikko, darbuka, ashiko, conga, djembe, daf, didgeridoo, bağlama, gusli, cimbalom, dulcimer, caxixi, agogô, bawu, mbira, marimba, udu, reco-reco, ocarina, morin khuur, tibetan horn, kangling, cajón, jew's harp, spring drum and many other.

== History ==
The band was founded in 1995 by Alexander Starostin – guitarist and composer – as a solo project. His stage name is Fedor Svolotch and the birth name of the band was the same. More members joined the band later, in 2000's, including vocalist and composer Yana Veva who also later participated in Shiva in Exile. In 1999 the band's name became Theodor Bastard as the English translation of the stage name 'Fedor Svolotch'.

In 2004 Theodor Bastard released the album Pustota. The album name is a Latin transliteration of the Russian word for emptiness, voidness. Considering a Buddhist concept Shunyata.

The band performed at famous festivals in Europe: Fusion Festival (2004), Wave-Gotik-Treffen (2011, 2014, 2017), Dark Bombastic Evening (2012, 2013, 2016), Castle Party (2014), Castlefest (2015, 2017), Mėnuo Juodaragis (2008, 2012, 2016) and others.

Theodor Bastard collaborated with many artists: Martin Atkins, Peter Christopherson, Stefan Hertrich, Fun-Da-Mental, Julien Jacob and others.

In November 2011 the album Remixed was released – the collection of remixes of Theodor Bastard's songs. Such artists from all over Europe as Riz Maslen, Animals on Wheels, Up, Bustle and Out, Robin Rimbaud, State of Bengal, Geomatic, Flint Glass and others took part in the work on the collection.

All 2011 Theodor Bastard worked on the new album. They recorded it in several studios at the same time. British band Fun-Da-Mental, African band The Mighty Zulu Nation, French singer Julien Jacob – took part in the recording. Many ethnic instruments as udu, mbira, marimba, reco-reco, caxixi, ashiko, and spring drum were used. Fedor Svolotch also used the instruments that he had invented and made of improvised materials, such as coconuts, door springs, empty bottles, and plastic. In February 2012 the album Oikoumene was released. Its name comes from Ecumene – an ancient Greek term for the known world.

In May 2015, Theodor Bastard released the album Vetvi. Its name is a Latin transliteration of the Russian word for branches bearing in mind the branches of the World tree. The work on this album took three years.

On December 4, 2017, Theodor Bastard released the soundtrack album Utopia for the game Pathologic 2 – the remake of the game Pathologic from Ice-Pick Lodge.

In the beginning of 2018 Theodor Bastard have finished the whole soundtrack for another awaited game – Life is Feudal: MMO, with 30 tracks, with many instruments including medieval and with vocal by Yana Veva.

10 year anniversary edition of the album Beloe was released in November 2018. The album Volch'ya Yagoda was released in April 2020. The album name means literally "Wolf's Berry" – the berry that belongs to a wolf. This is a common Russian name for forest dangerous (poisonous) berries.

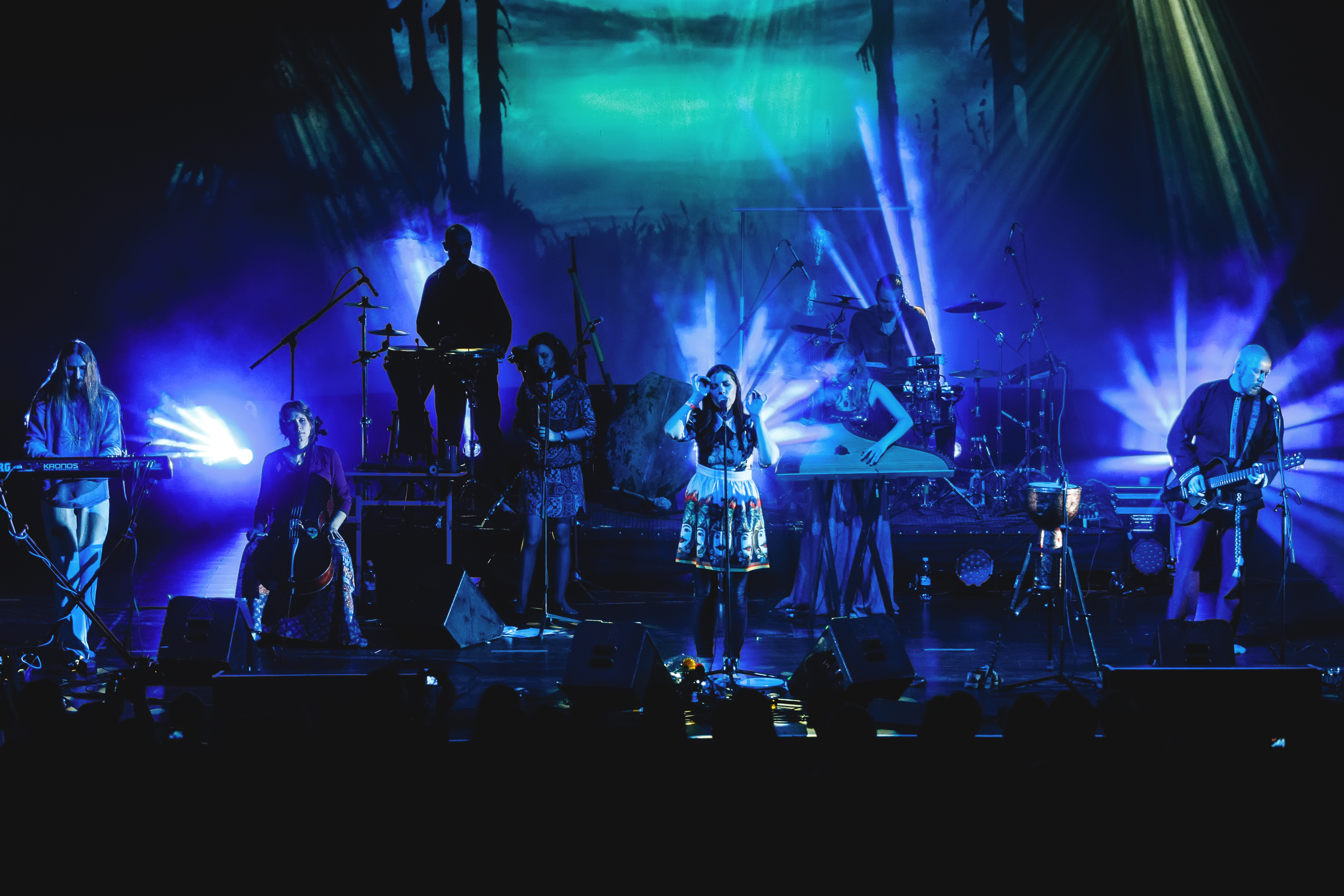
Theodor Bastard concert on July 19, 2015, at GlavClub, Saint-Petersburg

== Members ==
=== Current members ===
- Fedor Svolotch — guitars, sampler, vocals (1999–present)
- Yana Veva — vocals, bawu, ocarina (1999–present)
- Alexey "Kusas" Kurasov — ethnic percussions, winds (1999–present)
- Andrey "Andy Vladych" Dmitriev — drums (2009–2018, 2025—present)
- Alexey Kalinovskiy — keyboards (2014–present)
- Vyacheslav Salikov — cello (2019—present) (live member from 2018 to 2019)
- Ekaterina Dolmatova — backing vocals, gusli, flute (2019—present) (live member in 2016, from 2018 to 2019)

=== Former members ===
- Taras "Monthy" Frolov — keyboards (1999–2008) (live in 2014)
- Maxim "Max" Kostyunin — bass (1999–2008) (live in 2014)
- Anton Urazov — programming, sampler, jew's harp (2001–2005)
- Sergey Smirnov — drums (2019–2024)
- Vyacheslav Nikiforov — drums (2024–2025)

=== Former touring/session members ===
- Alexey Bazhenov — electric piano (2003)
- Mila Fedorova — cello (2004, 2005, 2007, 2008)
- Thorsten Berg — acoustic guitar (2004)
- Gregh Dotson — electric piano (2005)
- Maria Akimova — gusli (2008)
- Alexey "Prokhor" Mostiev — theremin (2008, 2010, 2015)
- Yan Nikitin — vocals (2007, 2008, 2010)
- ? — percussion (2009)
- Zmitser von Holzman — theremin, clarinet (2010, 2012)
- Vladimir Belov — cello (2010, 2013)
- ? — bass (2010)
- ? — drums (2011–2012)
- Valeria Atanova — backing vocals (2012)
- Eduard Dragunov — jew's harp, singing bowl, didgeridoo, throat singing (2012)
- Taras "Monthy" Frolov — keyboards (2012, 2014)
- Radik Tyulyush — shoor (2012)
- ? — keyboards (2012)
- Alia Sagitova — keyboards (2013)
- ? — cello (2013)
- ? — harp (2013)
- Vasil' Davletshin — bass (2013, 2016)
- Filipp Barskiy — harp, dulcimer (2013)
- Viktor Kabanov — theremin (2013)
- Maxim "Max" Kostyunin — bass, double bass (2014)
- ? — flute (2014, 2015)
- Natalia Nazarova — cello (2015)
- Kirill Sekerzhitskiy — bass (2015)
- Olga Glazova — gusli, backing vocals (2015, 2017)
- ? — backing vocals (2015)
- Ilya Kartashov — cello (2015, 2016, 2017)
- Ekaterina Dolmatova — backing vocals (2016, 2018–2019) (official member since 2019)
- Evgeniy Vikki — balalaika, bouzouki, flute (2017)
- Vitaliy Pogosyan — duduk (2017)
- Timofey Smagliev — drums (2018–2019)
- Vyacheslav Salikov — cello (2018–2019) (official member since 2019)
- Christine Kazaryan — harp

=== Directors of the group ===
- Alexey Bazhin — director (2009–2014)
- Maxim Krupoderya — director (2014–2016)
- Denis Knyazev — director (2017–2021) († 2 May 2021)

== Discography ==
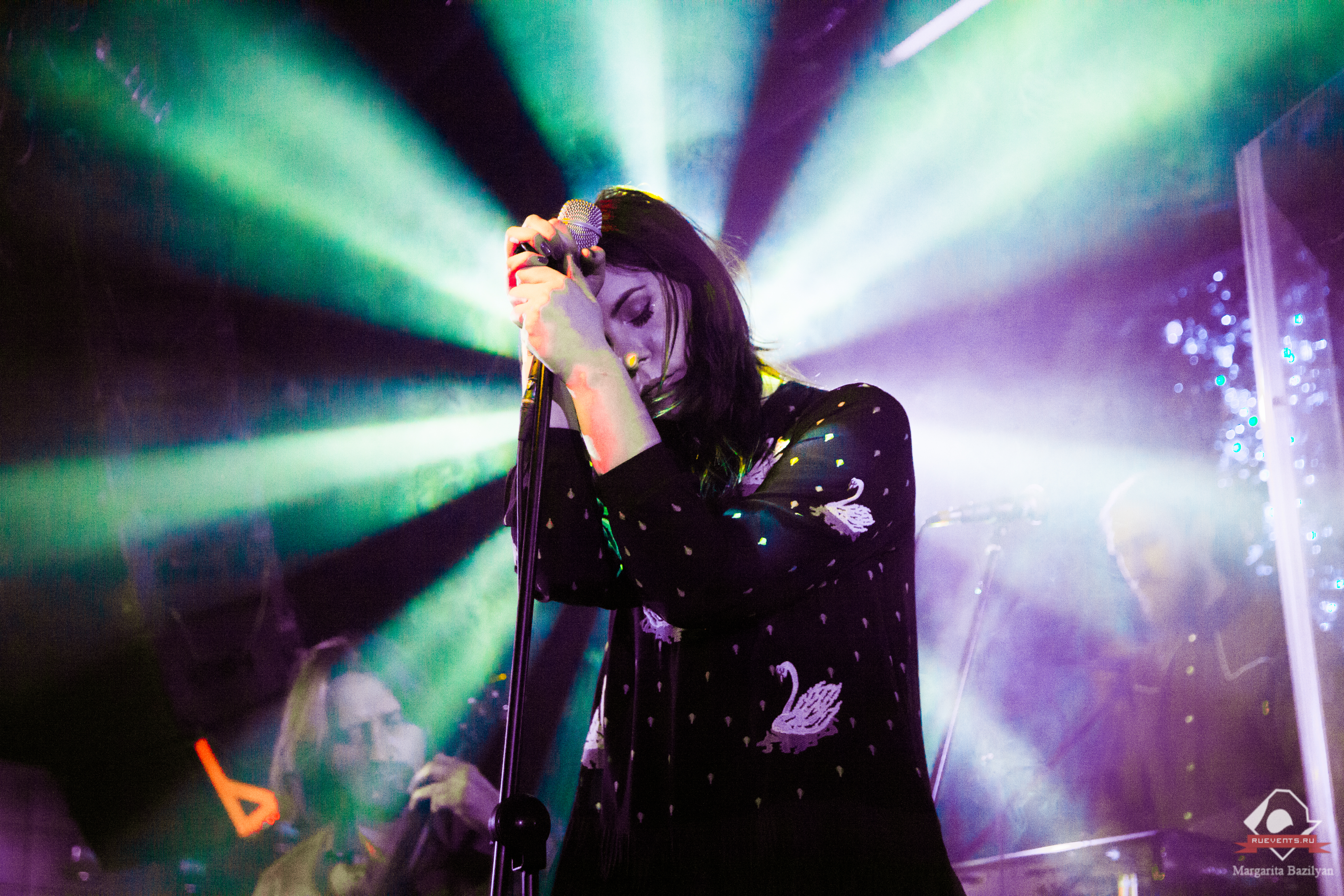
Yana Veva – concert on December 22, 2016 at Sixteen Tons, Moscow

Theodor Bastard – Selva (official video)

=== Fedor Svoloch (Фёдор Сволочь) ===
Original title	Transliterated Title	Translation	Year of release
Восемь способов добиться леди	Vosem' sposobov dobit'sya ledi	Eight methods to pick lady up	1996
Как не нужно делать попсу	Kak ne nuzhno delat' popsu	How not to create pop music	1997
Зверинец Крафта-Эбинга	Zverinec Krafta Ebinga	Krafft-Ebing's Bestiary	1998

=== Wave Save ===
Original title	Transliterated Title	Translation	Year of release
Wave Save	Wave Save	Wave Save	1999

=== Theodor Bastard ===
==== Studio albums ====
Original title	Transliterated Title	Translation	Year of release
Agorafobia	Agorafobia	Agoraphobia	2000
BossaNova_Trip	Bossa Nova Trip	Bossa Nova Trip	2002
Pustota	Pustota	Voidness	2004
Белое: Ловля Злых Зверей	Beloe: Lovlya Zlyh Zverei	White: Hunting For Fierce Beasts	2008
Белое: Предчувствия И Сны (alternative/re-recorded version of "Белое: Ловля Злых Зверей")	Beloe: Predchuvstviya I Sny	White: Premonitions And Dreams	2009
Oikoumene	Oikoumene	Ecumene	2012
Vetvi	Vetvi	Branches	2015
Волчья Ягода	Volch'ya Yagoda	Wolf's Berry	2020

==== Live albums ====
Original title	Transliterated Title	Translation	Year of release
Live In Heaven	Live In Heaven	Live In Heaven	2000
Sueta	Sueta	Bustle	2006

==== Compilation albums ====
Original title	Transliterated Title	Translation	Year of release
Remixed	Remixed	Remixed	2011

==== Soundtrack albums ====
Original title	Transliterated Title	Translation	Year of release
Music For The Empty Spaces (soundtracks written for documentaries for Brazilian director Gustavo Santos, for the film "Secrets of Ourselves" by Viktor Fokeev and for Japanese designer Yushi Kuroda's show)	Music For The Empty Spaces	Music For The Empty Spaces	2012
Utopia (soundtrack for the Pathologic 2 game)	Utopia	Utopia	2017
Life is Feudal (soundtrack for the game Life is Feudal: MMO)	Life is Feudal	Life is Feudal	2018
Ash of Gods: The Way Soundtrack (soundtrack for the game Ash of Gods: The Way)	Ash of Gods: The Way	Ash of Gods: The Way	2023

==== Reissue albums ====
Original title	Transliterated Title	Translation	Year of release				
Agoraphobia (remastered and partially re-recorded)	Agoraphobia	Agoraphobia	2007				
Pustota (Remastered) (remastered and partially re-recorded)	Pustota (Remastered)	Voidness (Remastered)	2014	Белое: Ловля злых зверей (10th Anniversary Edition) (both versions from "White: Hunting For Fierce Beasts" and "White: Premonitions And Dreams" are merged + partially re-recorded again in 2018)	Beloe: Lovlya Zlyh Zverey (10th Anniversary Edition)	White: Hunting For Fierce Beasts (10th Anniversary Edition)	2018

==== Singles ====
Original title	Transliterated Title	Translation	Year of release
Мир	Mir	World	2008
Будем жить	Budem zhit'	Will Live	2009
Tapachula	Tapachula	Tapachula	2010
Serp	Serp	Serp	2017

== Festivals ==
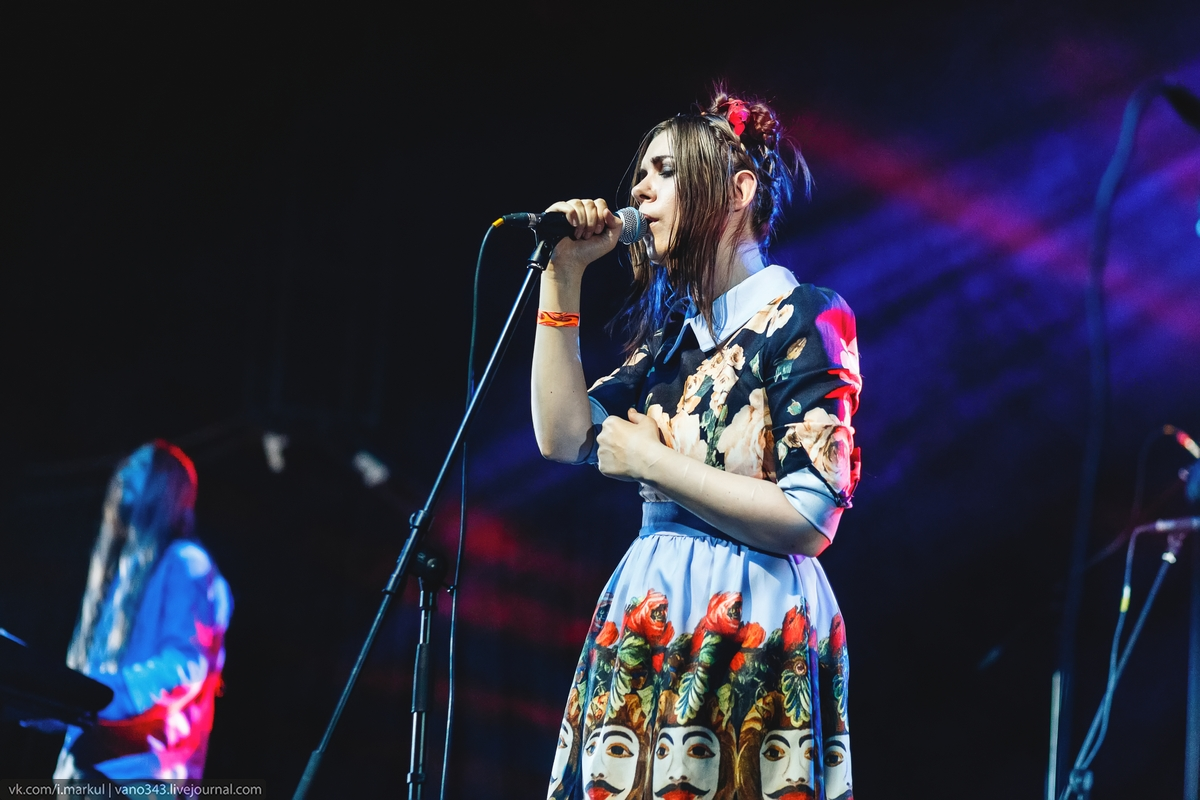
Yana Veva – concert on July 19, 2015 at GlavClub, Saint Petersburg

- 2000 - Свободный Полёт-2 (Russia)
- 2000 - Другая Культура (Russia)
- 2000 - Ушки В Трубочку-4 (Russia)
- 2001 – V международный фестиваль им. С. Курехина (СКИФ) (Russia)
- 2001 - Свободный Полёт IV (Russia)
- 2001 - Кислотный Тест (Russia)
- 2001 - Индустрия Звука (Russia)
- 2002 – Radio Inferno (Russia)
- 2003 – Faut Qu'ca Bouge (Belgium)
- 2004 – Fusion Festival (Germany)
- 2008 – Mėnuo Juodaragis XI (Lithuania)
- 2010 - Этномеханика (Russia)
- 2010 – Queer festival (Russia)
- 2011 – Wave-Gotik-Treffen (Germany)
- 2012 – Dark Bombastic Evening 4 (Romania)
- 2012 – Fekete Zaj (Hungary)
- 2012 – Mėnuo Juodaragis XV (Lithuania)
- 2012 – KAMWA (Russia)
- 2012 – Дикая Мята (Russia)
- 2013 – ReRe:Riga (Latvia)
- 2013 – Dark Bombastic Evening 5 (Romania)
- 2013 – Fekete Zaj (Hungary)
- 2013 – Вольнае паветра (Belarus)
- 2014 – Wave-Gotik-Treffen (Germany)
- 2014 - Движение (Russia)
- 2014 – Castle Party (Poland)
- 2014 – Labadaba (Latvia)
- 2014 – Дикая Мята (Russia)
- 2015 - Бродский Drive (Russia)
- 2015 - Зов Пармы (Russia)
- 2015 – Castlefest (Netherlands)
- 2016 – Tallinn Music Week (Estonia)
- 2016 - Троица: Всё живое (Russia)
- 2016 – Дикая Мята (Russia)
- 2016 – Dark Bombastic Evening 7 (Romania)
- 2016 – Mėnuo Juodaragis XIX (Lithuania)
- 2016 - Алтея (Russia)
- 2017 – Music Drive (Armenia)
- 2017 – Wave-Gotik-Treffen (Germany)
- 2017 - МИР Сибири (Russia)
- 2017 - Белый шум (Russia)
- 2017 - Метафест (Russia)
- 2017 – Castlefest (Netherlands)
- 2017 – FourЭ (Kazakhstan)
- 2017 - Камяніца (Belarus)
