= Atalyja =

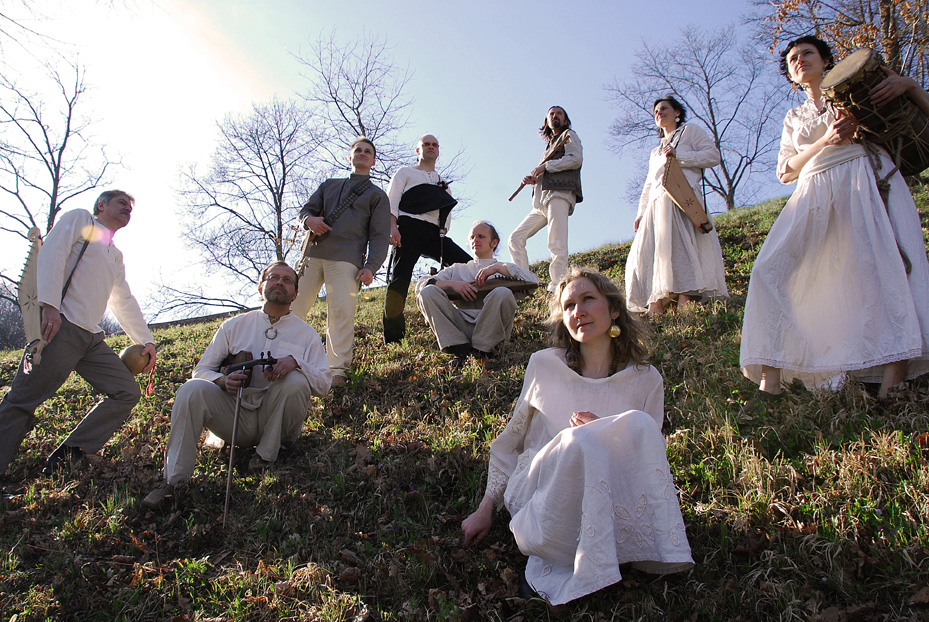
- Atalyja, (2009).

Background information
- Origin: Vilnius, Lithuania
- Genres: Rock, folk, folk rock, progressive folk
- Years active: 1998–present
- Labels: Kukū, Dangus Productions
- Members: Gedimina Statulevičienė; Audronė Daraškevičienė; Darutė Pilibavičienė; Rytis Ambrazevičius; Ernest Jepifanov; Eirimas Velička; Gediminas Žilys; Ugnius Keturka; Salvijus Žeimys
- Website: www.atalyja.com

Atalyja (“The rain is coming”) is a Lithuanian folk-rock music band. They focus on the popularizing of archaic Lithuanian folklore and bringing ancient songs to contemporary audiences. The band has produced songs of various musical styles, a broad tonal palette, and unique arrangements. The ancient melodies are enriched with elements of rock, jazz, funk, blues rock, metal, and Indian music. Atalyja regularly participates in music festivals. The band has released three CD albums and has given performances in Lithuania, Latvia, Estonia, Poland, Germany, Turkey, Czechia, Belarus, and Russia.

The main part of the repertoire consists of sutartinės, a type of archaic polyphonic song, calendar, war-historical, and wedding songs. Musical expression ranges from meditative improvisation to hard compositional art rock. The band's musicians experiment with different styles – the melodies of traditional songs are mixed with elements of classic rock, metal rock, blues rock, funk, and progressive rock, as well as classical music.

== History ==
Atalyja was created in 1998, and a year later, the band had their first appearance at the post-folk festival "Suklegos" in Kaunas, Lithuania. In 2000, the debut album "Atalyja" was released, receiving international attention through folk and world music publications. The second album, "Bansuri" (The Mother), released in 2004 (Ctablangus Records), was recognized as one of the most substantial modern folk music releases in Lithuanian discography. In their 2009 album, "Saula riduolėla" (Sun the Roller) (Dangus Records), "strict" composition blended with improvisation and experimentation with ties to solar themes.

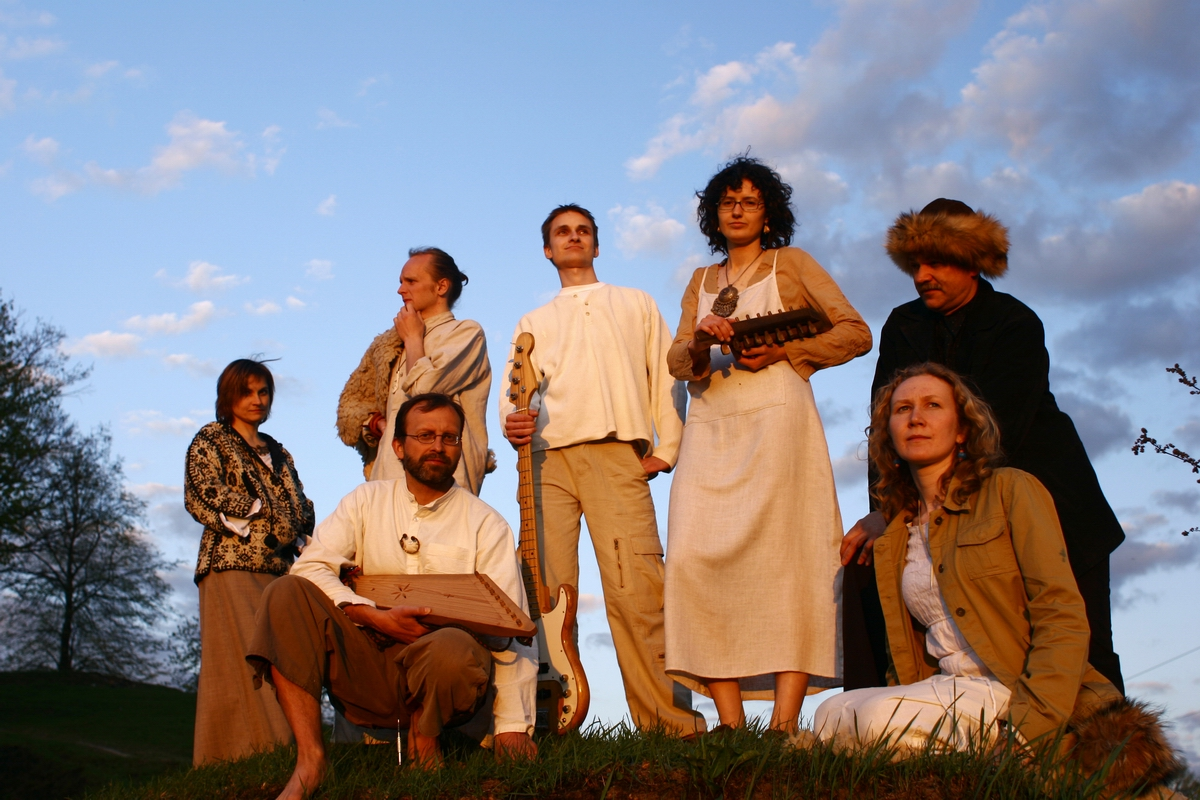
Atalyja

Currently, there are four vocalists: Gedimina Statulevičienė, Audronė Daraškevičienė, Darutė Pilibavičienė (who also plays kanklės) and Rytis Ambrazevičius (who also plays kanklės). The group has several multi-instrumentalists including: Ernest Jepifanov (bansuri, viola, bagpipe, and panpipes), Eirimas Velička (violin, kanklės, and jaw harp), Gediminas Žilys (bass guitar and kanklės), Ugnius Keturka (electric and acoustic guitar) and Salvijus Žeimys (percussion).

The band has given concerts in Poland, Estonia, Latvia, Germany, Turkey, Czech Republic. Atalyja has also participated in Lithuanian radio and television programs and is a common participant in Lithuanian folk, post-folk, and neofolk festivals and city and town feasts. Some festivals they continue to appear at include Mėnuo Juodaragis, Baltic sound, Suklegos, Gyvosios archeologijos dienos and Skamba skamba kankliai. The band's music is also used in numerous art projects, films and theater performances.

The group was awarded ethnoband of the year at the alternative music awards in 2008.

In 2009 the band presented their album, Saulala Riduolela (Sun The Roller), in Vilnius and Kaunas. They also gave concerts in Minsk (which were filmed by Belarusian ONT TV television); Riga, Latvia; Prague (in the musical club "Acropolis"); Olsztynek; and Gdańsk, Poland. In November 2009, Atalyja performed on a Christmas Tour in Moscow (on the 25th at a club called Masterskaya and on the 26th at the cultural centre of Lithuanian embassy, Jurgis Baltrusaitis House).

== Members ==
- Gedimina Statulevičienė – vocal
- Audronė Daraškevičienė – vocal
- Darutė Pilibavičienė – vocal, kanklės
- Ernest Jepifanov – bansuri, viola, bagpipe, jaw harp, skudučiai (panpipes), vocal
- Rytis Ambrazevičius – vocal, kanklės, bagpipe, jaw harp
- Eirimas Velička – violin, kanklės, bagpipe, jaw harp, vocal
- Ugnius Keturka – electric guitar, acoustic guitar
- Gediminas Žilys – bass, kanklės, vocal
- Salvijus Žeimys – percussion

== Discography ==
- Atalyja; MC, 2000
- Atalyja; CD, 2001
- Močia; CD, 2004
- Žemaitiu ruoks; EP, 2008
- Saula Riduolėla; CD, 2009
