= Dandelion Wine (band) =

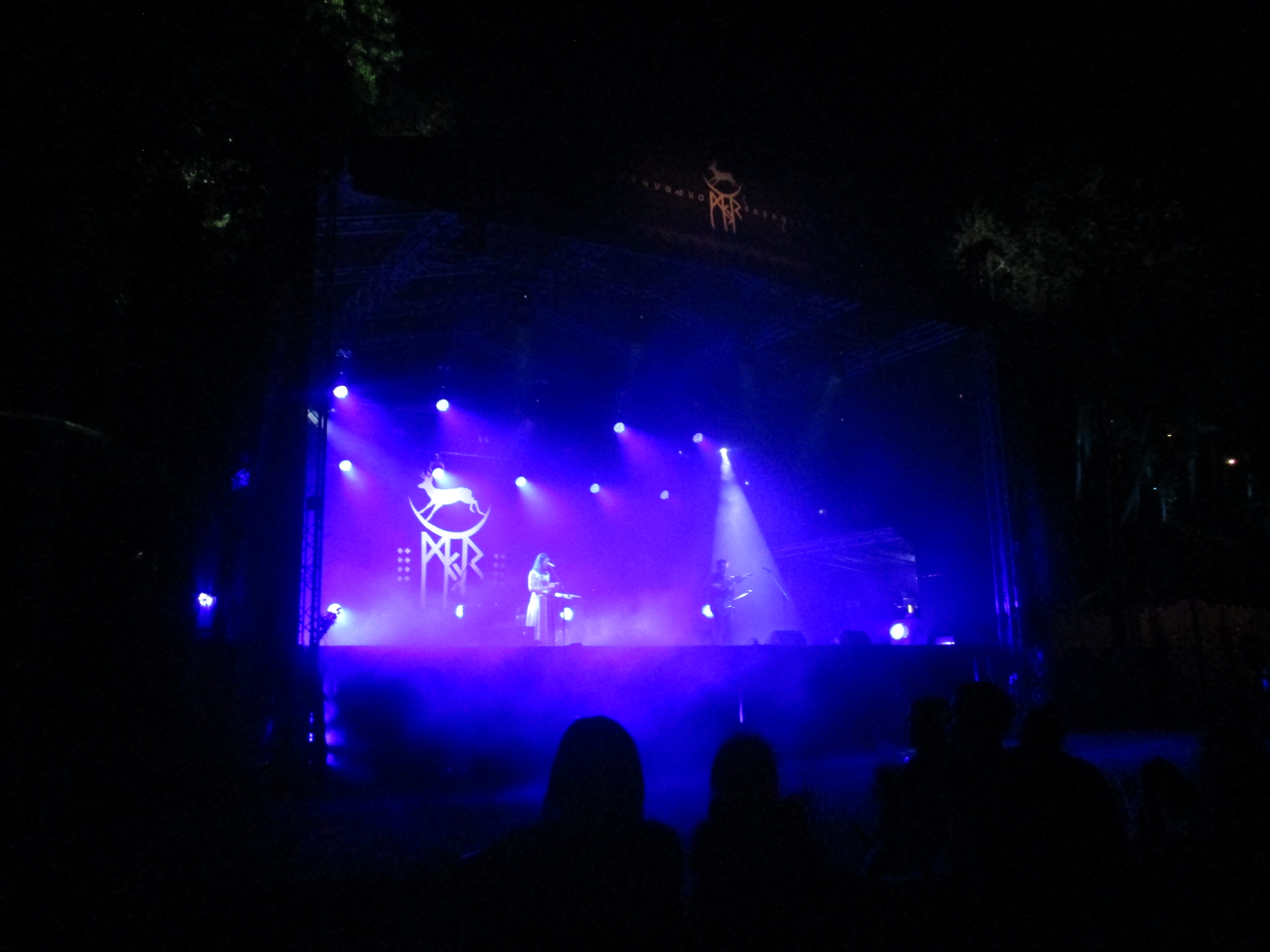
Dandelion Wine performing on the Mėnuo Juodaragis Great Heavenly Stage, August 25, 2018.

Dandelion Wine are a musical trio based in Melbourne, Victoria, Australia. The band combines medieval and Middle Eastern instruments with electronic beats, analogue synths, female vocals and swirling guitars. Their music incorporates elements of ethereal, medieval, world music, dream pop, electronica and darkwave.

== History ==
The band originated as a four-piece outfit in mid-1996, but have had many line-up shifts throughout the years, with core members Naomi Henderson and Nicholas Albanis being the only remaining members of the original line-up.

The band undertook their first European tour in late 2002, in support of their first European release Light Streaming Down. A number of labels in Europe, Australia and the United States distribute the CD and the tour included Germany, Switzerland, Poland and the UK. The band then returned shortly after in May 2003 for a short tour including Romania, Poland, Netherlands and Germany.

In September 2006 signed with German label Ars Musica Diffundére/Black Rain Dandelion Wine released a new studio album, ~An Inexact Science~ and embarked on their most extensive Australian tour to date with dates in most mainland capitals. The 2007 European tour featured concerts in Japan, Germany, Czech Republic, Poland, Belgium, Netherlands and Switzerland, including a performance at the Leipzig Schauspielhaus at Wave Gotik Treffen, the world's largest dark music festival.

The album, Selected Anachronisms, was released in Europe and North America in April 2008 with another tour including Japan, Germany, Switzerland, Poland, Lithuania, France and the UK. This tour included touring member Kirstin Honey, on synthesizer, accordion, recorder and backing vocals and included festivals such as Wave Gotik Treffen, Kunigunda Lunaria (Lithuania) and the 3 Wishes Faery Festival (UK).

All Becompassed By Stars was the group's first album that was made outside of Australia. In 2009 the band relocated to Berlin, Germany and set up a studio in an apartment in Berlin's Kreuzberg region, where they worked through the 2009 and 2010 winter to record the album. The album was mastered in Clisson, France by Frédéric Chaplain of the Prikosnovenie label. This album was released on 26 March 2010 by Aus Musica Diffundére/Black Rain Media Group GmbH and was accompanied by a European Tour that began in Lithuania and ended at Les Anthinoises Festival in Belgium, where they collaborated onstage with Belgian band Keltia.

Since the release of All Becompassed By Stars Dandelion Wine have only released one digital single (One Of My Friendly Days) although they have undertaken European tours in 2012 and 2013 with performances at Festival Mediaval in Germany, Bruchtal Festival in Switzerland and the band's first concerts in Hong Kong and Estonia. The 2013 tour was partly funded by a successful Pozible campaign that resulted in fans voting on the colour of Naomi Henderson's hair for the tour.

After an absence from live performance, in 2015 the band announced a performance in Melbourne with Eden a new forthcoming album and a new lineup featuring New Zealand cellist Francesca Mountfort.

== Current members ==
- Naomi Henderson: Vocals, flute, recorder, guitar, percussion, keyboards, sansula
- Nicholas Albanis: Guitar, Appalachian dulcimer, hammered dulcimer, lute, bowed psaltery, keyboards, electronics, percussion, bell cittern, vocals
- Phil Coyle: Frame drums, Tombak, aludu
- Georgie-Brooke MacLucas: Violin, vocals

== Former members ==
- Daniel Stefanski (violin)
- Alistair Galloway (bass)
- Steve Wheeler (bass)
- Kirstin Honey (synthesizer, accordion, backing vocals)
- Brett Bridges (drums, percussion)
- Dri (percussion)
- Steve Ambrose (drums)
- Ryan McClusky (percussion)
- Hamza (Drums)
- Francesca Mountfort (Cello, glockenspiel, vocals)

== Discography ==
=== Albums ===
List of albums, with selected details
| Title | Details |
|---|---|
| Tunguska Butterfly | Released: 2000; Label: Crustacean Creations (CC001); Format: CD |
| ~An Inexact Science~ | Released: 2006; Label: Crustacean Creations (CC005); Format: CD |
| Selected Anachronisms | Released: April 2008; Label: Ars Musica Diffundere (AMD 017); Format: CD, digital |
| All Becompassed By Stars | Released: 2010; Label: Ars Musica Diffundere (AMD 021); Format: CD, digital |
| Le Cœur | Released: August 2018; Label: Dangus (DNG 064); Format: CD, digital |
| Hearafter | Released: June 2023; Label: Dandelion Wine; Format: digital, 12-inch vinyl |

== Awards and nominations ==
=== Music Victoria Awards ===
The Music Victoria Awards are an annual awards night recognising Victorian music. They commenced in 2006.

| Year | Nominee / work | Award | Result | Ref. |
|---|---|---|---|---|
| 2023 | Dandelion Wine | Best Folk Work | Nominated | |
