= Life Is Feudal =

Life is Feudal: Your Own
- Developer: Bitbox Ltd.
- Designers: Vladimir Piskunov, Artur Borodin
- Engine: Feudal Engine (Modified Torque 3D Version 1.1)
- Platform: Microsoft Windows
- Release: 17 November 2015
- Genres: Online role-playing video game, Sandbox

Life is Feudal is a video game franchise set in a fictional Medieval world, developed by Bitbox Ltd. On top of their two flagship titles - Life is Feudal: Your Own and Life is Feudal: MMO, Bitbox Ltd have expanded the franchise by publishing other titles, such as MindIllusion's title, Forest Village.

Life is Feudal: Forest Village
- Developer: Mindillusion
- Publisher: Bitbox Ltd.
- Designers: Вячеслав Доценко, Oleg Kolyada, Дмитрий Шкаровский
- Engine: Feudal Engine (Modified Torque 3D Version 1.1)
- Platform: Microsoft Windows
- Release: 26 August 2016 (Early Access); May 26, 2017 (Full release)
- Genres: Indie, Simulation, Strategy, Early Access

Life is Feudal: MMO
- Developer: Bitbox Ltd.
- Engine: Feudal Engine (Modified Torque 3D Version 1.1)
- Release: early 2018
- Genres: MMORPG, Online role-playing video game, Sandbox

== Development ==
During the late winter of 2014, the indie team - which later became Bitbox Ltd - had created a working tech demo for the concept of Life is Feudal: MMO, showcasing many of the main gameplay features, such as real time multiplayer, terraforming, and objects construction.

Life is Feudal: Your Own (LiF:YO) and Life is Feudal: MMO (LiF:MMO) shared the same codebase and were developed simultaneously. Life is Feudal: Your Own was first launched by Bitbox Ltd. on the gaming platform Steam in September 2014 under the Early Access program, reaching Steam's ‘Top Ten’ within two weeks. Within a month, Life is Feudal: Your Own sold over 100,000 copies and continued to rise in popularity.

Life is Feudal: Your Own was released out of Early Access on 17 November 2015, including a trailer and launch cutscene narrated by Sean Bean. After the release of Life is Feudal: Your Own, Bitbox Ltd. expanded to launch Life is Feudal: MMO. Closed beta tests for the game began during the second half of 2016. Bitbox Ltd. also announced a partnership with Xsolla in support of Life is Feudal: MMO.

Also in 2016, Bitbox Ltd. published another game as part of the Life is Feudal franchise; Life is Feudal: Forest Village, developed by the studio MindIllusion and released on Steam. Life is Feudal: Forest Village focused on town-building, and received indifferent reviews upon launch.

== Life is Feudal: Your Own ==
In Life is Feudal: Your Own, the player is randomly placed on a 9 square kilometer map and must gather necessary resources to survive. Hunger, wild animals and combat with other players present the main source of challenge, and the game's design encourages co-operation. Players can also build structures and terraform land as part of a persistent world.

Life is Feudal: Your Own allows up to 64 players to play together on a private or public hosted server.

== Life is Feudal: MMO ==
Life is Feudal: MMO was a multiplayer sandbox RPG with survival aspects. Described as a "real life Medieval simulator MMO", the game featured a 21 km x 21 km world inspired by the cold regions of Northern Europe. Life is Feudal: MMO took place in a realistic feudal setting where players worked their way up from scavenging for materials and shelter to becoming a leader of a guild. The game included a crafting system, building features, and terraforming across the map, meaning players could construct their own house and town anywhere in the world.

The game premiered in 2017 and shut down in January 2021. It was relaunched in 2023 by a new studio.
