= Troll Bends Fir =

Russian band

Troll Bends Fir Тролль Гнёт Ель
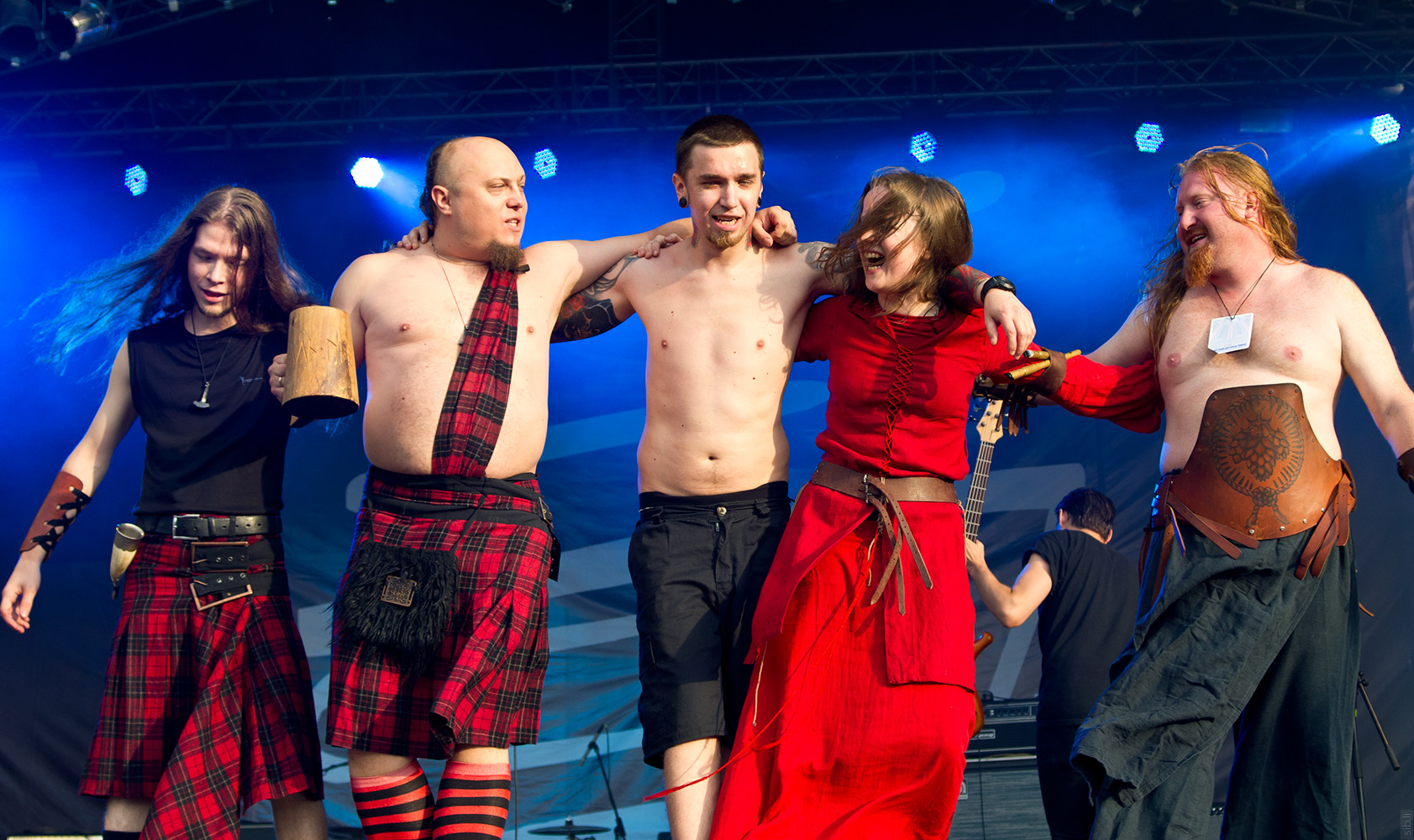
- Troll Gnet El russian folk metal band performing on “Nashestvie 2011” rock festival

Background information
- Origin: Saint Petersburg, Russia
- Genres: Folk metal Folk rock
- Years active: 1999–present
- Labels: Kailas Records, Mysteria zvuka, Screaming Banshee, Sound Age
- Members: Konstantin "Troll" Rumyantsev; Maria "Jetra" Leonova; Sergey "Skjoldy Nemtinov"; Svetlana "Tirend" Sulimova; Aleksey "Ainar" Magin; Andrey "Lukich" Lukin
- Website: trollge.ru

Troll Bends Fir (Russian: Тролль Гнёт Ель, romanized: Trollʹ Gnyót Yelʹ pronounced [trolʲ ˈɡnʲɵt jelʲ]) is a folk metal (previously folk rock) band from Saint Petersburg, Russia. Band members define their style as "beer folk", most lyrics are based on Scandinavian mythology and, as well as the band's image, are related to beer and brewing. TBF has its own recognizable sound combining traditional metal music instruments with violin and Irish whistle.

== History ==
The band was founded in 1999 by Konstantin "Troll" Rumyantsev (ex-vocalist of Nomans Land) and Maria "Jetra" Leonova. The first demo-recording was brought out in 2003 as a demo for clubs but its success attracted the attention of a local label who offered to release the album "Troll Bends Fir". The first issue of 5000 copies was sold out in no time.

Due to growing popularity abroad, TBF changed their Russian name to "Troll Bends Fir" for use in non-Cyrillic countries, though "Тролль Гнёт Ель" is still used. In 2009 TBF released "1516/Order of the Holy Hop"LP (mastered at Finnvox Studios) that showed their tendency to switch from folk rock to folk metal.

Having about 80 gigs per a year TBF takes part in each of the largest rock and folk festivals in Russia such as Nashestvie, Vozdukh, Dobrofest, Rock Palace. Festivals abroad: Mėnuo Juodaragis (Lithuania), Festival-Mediaval and Tanzt!2012 (Germany), Noc Świętojańska in Wroclaw, Poland.

The band's 5th album "Brothers in Drinks" was released in September 2011 in Germany by "Screaming Banshee" label supported by EMP Merchandising and later in Russia by the main metal label "Sound Age". A bonus track "Humppa is My Neighbour" features guest vocals from Korpiklaani frontman Jonne Järvelä. "Brothers in Drinks" tour included Russia, Belarus, Ukraine, Baltic States.

== Line up ==
=== Current members ===
- Konstantin "Troll" Rumyantsev – vocals, guitars
- Maria "Jetra" Leonova – vocals, Irish whistle
- Sergey "Skjoldy" Nemtinov – bass
- Andrey "Andy" Tepper – violin
- Maria "Malina" Lebedeva – violin
- Andrey "Lukich" Lukin - drums

=== Former members ===
- Anna Fomina - violin
- Boris Senkin - bass
- Aleksey "Elias" Mester - violin
- Aleksey "Alex" Semenov - drums
- Svetlana Sulimova - violin
- Aleksey "Ainar" Magin - drums

== Discography ==
Studio albums

- Prazdnik Pohmelyainen (Hangoverlainen Holiday) (2005)
- Konung Hmel (Konung Hop) (2007)
- 1516/Orden Presvetlogo Hmelya (1516/Order of the Holy Hop) (2009)
- Bratya vo Hmelyu (Brothers in Drinks) (2011)
- Khmel'noye Serdtse (Hopheart) (2013)
- Karjalali (2016)
- Labirint Trolley (Labyrinth of Trolls) (2018)

EP

- Oktoberfest (2010)
- Hoplnir (2011)

Demo

- Troll Gnyot Yel (Troll Bends Fir) (2003)

Music videos

- "Pivovarnya Ulva (Ulv's Brewery)"
- "Ave Celia!" (2012)
- "Humppa is My Neighbour" official making-of (2012)
- "Ass Shaking Dance (Zhopotryas)" (2012)
- "Chug!" (2017)
- "Karjalltroll" (2018)
- "Patrick INT" (2018)
