= Vilkduja =

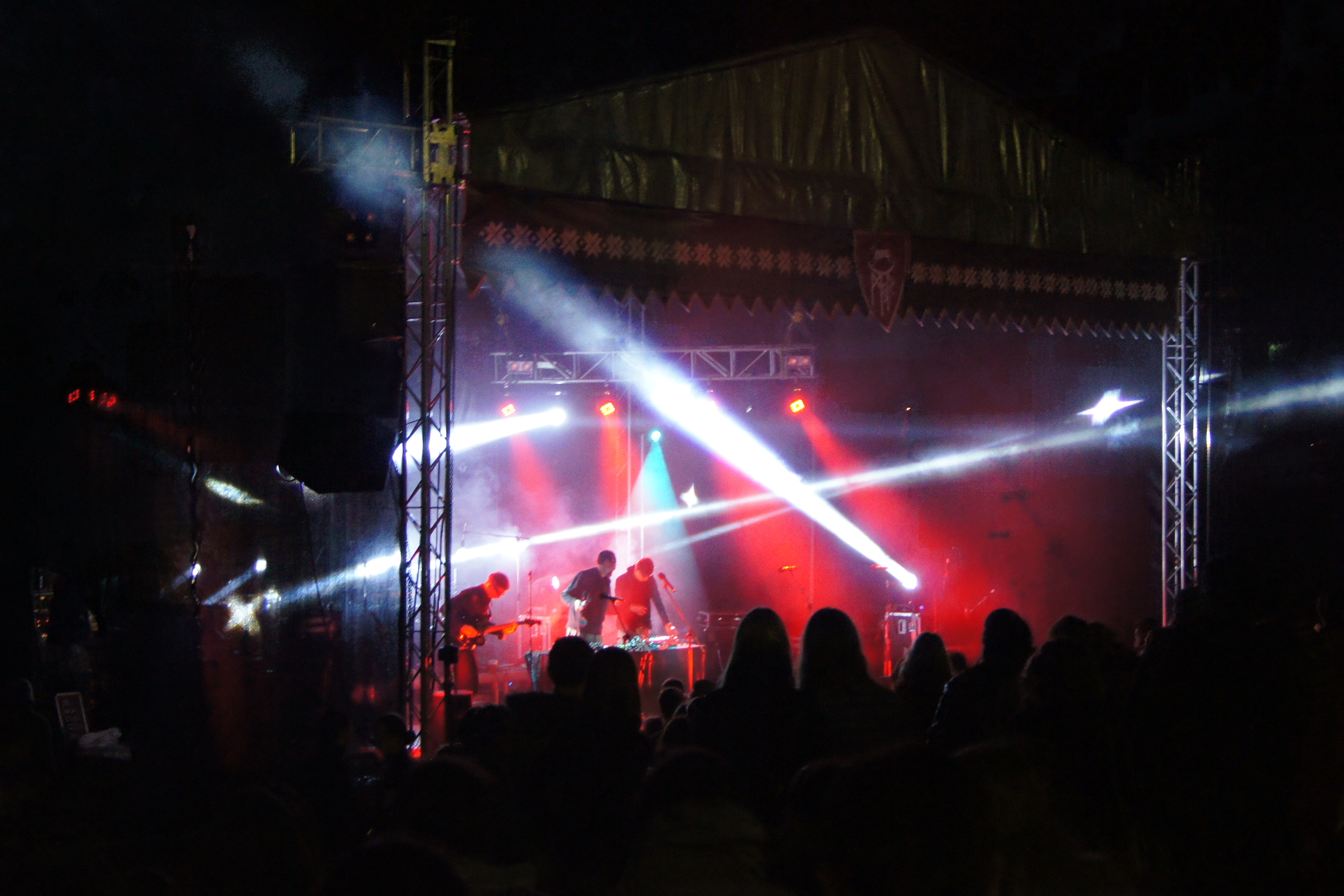
- Performing at "Mėnuo Juodaragis 2013" festival

Background information
- Origin: Vilnius, Lithuania
- Genres: trip-hop, dark cabaret, neofolk, experimental music, post-punk
- Years active: 1999–present
- Label: Dangus
- Members: Povilas Vaitkevičius

Vilkduja is a dark music band from Lithuania, started by Povilas Vaitkevičius, who is also the creator of the band's music and lyrics.

== History ==
Since the early 1990s, Povilas Vaitkevičius (a.k.a. PoPo) has participated in various dark and alternative Lithuanian musical projects. He has collaborated with underground metal, folk-rock, and electro music groups including Peorth, Ugnėlakis, Spanxti, Lauxna Lauksna, Andaja, Letarg, and Žalvarinis. In addition to Vilkduja, he also worked on a ritual ambient music project called Oorchach.

The name Vilkduja comes from a folk tale written by Mečislovas Davainis-Silvestraitis. The word literally means "the time when wolves rove", and is used to refer to twilight.

Although it is generally accepted that Vilkduja was created in 1999, Vaitkevičius himself considers his early records as experiments and considered the album Vakar duona (2008) the band's true beginning.

Vilkduja is a frequent participant at the Mėnuo Juodaragis and Velnio akmuo festival. The band played in Estonia and the Netherlands and has arranged solo concerts in Lithuania.

== Style ==
Vilkduja's musical style has been characterized as trip-hop, experimental music, post-punk, and dark cabaret. "Cold" electronic rhythms are often mixed with elements of noise and lyrics from esoteric magic-related texts. It has been described as "modern folklore" that "creates new from what is old".

Vilkduja's lyrics are characterized by vivid mythical and poetic imagery, such as light and space (e.g. the sun, stars, twilight, and the moon), lively and even mythical creatures (e.g. cats, fish, devils, birds) and motifs of fluidity. Vilkduja's numinous music contrasts vocals with moments of silence to create fantastical effects and aspires to cross geographic boundaries.

== Discography ==
- Prieblanda ir žemės arbata (2001)
- Vakar duona (2008)
- Dabartis (2009)
- Nežinau (2010)
- Auštanti / Nušviesta (2012)
- Viduje (2012)
- III (split with OBŠRR and Rumunija, 2015)
- Insomnia (EP, 2015)
- Cosmogonia (2018)
- Purvinas ir šventas (EP, 2019)
- Numinosum (2024)

== Links ==
- Vilkduja at bandcamp.com
- Vilkduja at soundcloud.com
