= Life Is Feudal: MMO =

Life is Feudal: MMO
- Developer: Bitbox Ltd.
- Publisher: Xsolla
- Engine: Modified Torque 3D
- Platform: Microsoft Windows
- Release: Late 2017 (Beta); June 1, 2023 (LTG's relaunch)
- Genres: MMORPG, Online role-playing video game, Sandbox
- Mode: Multiplayer

Life is Feudal: MMO was a massively multiplayer online role-playing game in a medieval setting, developed by indie studio Bitbox Ltd. and published by Xsolla as a multiplayer expansion of the studio's earlier title, Life is Feudal: Your Own. The Open Beta release of the game occurred on November 17, 2017. The game entered Steam Early Access in January 2018. In December 2020, Bitbox announced that the game would be shut down following financial difficulties and a relationship breakdown with the game's publisher, Xsolla. On January 18, 2021, the game's servers were permanently shut down. On June 1, 2023, the game was relaunched by the new publisher, Long Tale Games, on their website, ltg.com.

== Gameplay ==
Life is Feudal: MMO supported full terraforming of the environment, free construction, a branched system of crafts, survival elements, a non-armored combat system and realistic physics. Life is Feudal: MMO's gameplay occurred in a persistent 21x21 km map and included mechanisms for guilds of players to claim land and build trade routes.

The world could be terraformed, and players could dig tunnels, create canyons, mounds, lower and raise the ground according to their own needs. Players were encouraged to collaborate via the game's guilds system, which would allow groups of at least 10 players to claim areas of land, preventing modification by non-guild players. Player-built persistent trading posts allowed for commerce.

The combat system calculated damage based on weapon mass and velocity. Directional attacks could be blocked with the corresponding directional block which would temporarily stagger the attacker and allow for a counterattack.

== Reception ==
The game had a mixed reception amongst players, with 42% of reviews on Steam being positive as of 2023. Bleeding Cool praised the beta version of Life is Feudal: MMO in 8.5 points out of ten, calling the project "labor of love." GameStar characterized the game as an "extremely realistic simulator of the Middle Ages." The game was criticized for its confusing tutorial and hard-to-navigate user interface.
