= Romowe Rikoito =

- Genres: Neofolk, dark folk
- Years active: 1995–present
- Labels: Brudenia, Ars Benevola Mater, Dangus
- Members: Glabbis Niktorius, Agota, Ian, Adam
- Past members: Johnny, Poonk, Victoria Koulbachnaya, Elena Kosheleva, Julia, Alwārmija, Aleks Ālaukis, Anny
- Website: Official site

Romowe Rikoito is a neofolk band currently based in Vilnius, Lithuania. It was formed by Glabbis Niktorius in 1995 and named after the ancient Prussian spiritual center Romowe (also known as Rikoyto). The group has released six albums. The first two albums, Narcissism and L’Automne Eternel, are based on the ideas of melancholy, death and grief, while Āustradēiwa, Undēina, Nawamār, and UKA are dedicated to Old Prussia. They sing in the Old Prussian language.

== History ==
In 2014, Lithuanian independent music label published Romowe Rikoito's 4th album Undēina which is described as a "magical journey through modern Western Baltic world" by the label Dangus. Almost all compositions are performed in Prussian language, beside using dark folk instruments, its sounding enriched by folk instruments such as kanklės and ocarina. Undēina is dedicated to the Prussian mythology, sages and sacred places. All sounds were recorded in nature while visiting forests, rivers, sacred places of Old Prussia.

== Musical style and lyrical themes ==
The music of Romowe Rikoito is characterized as "deep, unique, full of twilight, melancholy, sacred harmony, mysterious hope and decadence" by label Dangus. Compositions are performed by acoustic guitars, cello, flute, violin, keyboards. This band performed various poems written by Aleister Crowley, Dante Gabriel Rossetti, Gérard de Nerval, Chidiock Tichborne also a Prussian version of intro of the first Lithuanian poem "Metai" by Kristijonas Donelaitis.

== Members ==
=== Current ===
- Glabbis Niktorius – vocals, guitars, kanklės, percussion, psaltery, sounds (1995–present)
- Agota Zdanavičiūtė – vocals, kanklės (2022–present)
- Ian Campbell – vocals, guitars, synthesizers (2022–present)
- Adam Ormes – vocals, percussion, harmonium, synthesizers (2022–present)

=== Former ===
- Johnny (Sergey Ivanov) – guitars (1995–2006)
- Poonk (Dmitry Demidov) – violin, tape, keyboards, sounds (1996–2001)
- Victoria Koulbachnaya – flute, keyboards (1996–2006)
- Julia – vocals (1996–2006)
- Anny (Anna Ivanova) – cello (1999–2014)
- Ludmila – violin (1999–2000)
- Elena Kosheleva – violin (2001–2006)
- Aleks Āulaukis (Alexey Popov) – guitars, synthesizers, keyboards, effects and sounds, percussion, glockenspiel, psaltery, melodica (2009–2023)
- Tatiana Korotkova – vocals, percussion, melodica, glockenspiel (2011–2017)
- Aliona Ilnitskaya – violin (2012–2013)
- Alwārmija (Karina Rode) – vocals, percussion, didgeridoo (2012–2022)

== Discography ==
- Narcissism (1997)
- L’Automne Eternel (2000)
- Āustradēiwa (2005)
- Undēina (2014)
- Nawamār (2016)
- UKA (2024)

== Links ==
- Official page
- Official Facebook page
- Official BandCamp page
