= Sangre de Muerdago =

Galician Neofolk band based in Germany

Sangre de Muerdago is a Galician neofolk band formed in Ourense but based in Leipzig (Germany).

The band was started in by Pablo Caamiña Ursusson and Jorge Olson de Abreu in 2007, when they released their first demo Sangre de Muerdago. The group recorded their self-titled first full-length album in 2009.

Their lyrics, sung in Galician, are inspired by the Galician and European tradition, dealing with themes related to nature with mystical elements. They make use of traditional musical instruments such as the hurdy-gurdy and the nyckelharpa. They have converted several poems by Galician writers into contemporary music, including the works of Rosalía de Castro, Celso Emilio Ferreiro and Manuel María. The group have performed 20 international tours, and have collaborated in split albums with other artists such as Novemthree, Monarch, Steve Von Till (Neurosis) and Judasz & Nahimana.

== Discography ==
Since their formation they have released 7 full-length albums, as well as several EPs and other works in different formats.

Year	Title	Format
2007	Sangre de Muerdago	Demo
2010	Sangre de Muerdago	LP
2013	Deixádeme Morrer no Bosque	LP
2014	Nas Fragas do Río Eume	EP
2014	Braided Paths	Split album with Novemthree
2015	Lembranzas Dende o Lado Salvaxe	Compilation
2015	O Camiño das Mans Valeiras	LP
2017	Os Segredos da Raposa Vermella	EP
2018	Vagalumes	EP
2018	Noite	LP
2020	As Voces da Pedra	Split album with Monarch
2020	Xuntas	LP
2021	Cantiga de Folhas e Agulhas	Live session with Judasz & Nahimana
2022	Cantiga da Rainha das Aguas	Live session with Judasz & Nahimana
2023	O Vento que Lambe as miñas Feridas	LP
2025	O Xardín	LP
