= Skylė =

Lithuanian band

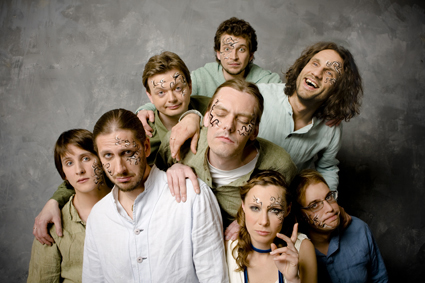
- Skylė in 2008

Background information
- Origin: Vilnius, Lithuania
- Genres: Rock, punk rock, neofolk, art rock
- Years active: 1991–present
- Label: Via Artis
- Members: Rokas Radzevičius; Aistė Smilgevičiūtė; Kęstutis Drazdauskas; Mantvydas Kodis; Gediminas Žilys; Jonas Krivickas; Salvijus Žeimys
- Website: http://www.skyle.lt

SKYLĖ (Hole/Chasm) is a band formed in Vilnius in 1991. The main principles of the band is the spread of alternative music and poetic thoughts based on philosophy, mythology and history. To date, band released 14 albums.

== Band biography ==
Skylė was formed in the autumn of 1991. In the beginning it was a student rock band trying to merge various music styles, starting from punk rock to folk rock and art rock. They started performing at student festivals, and the atmosphere there used to get really electric. But the five band members, playing the guitar, bass, keyboard, violin and percussion in those days, didn‘t want to restrict themselves to rock music only. Skylė became the circle of open-minded intellectuals and started organizing exhibitions of underground art and non commercial festivals (like "Free Tibet" in 1995), in such a way attracting crowds of young multitalented people. In 1994 and 1995 four issues of the publication called "Balsas is Rūsio" ("The Voice From the Cellar") and also an alternative art and poetry almanac "Plyšys" ("The Gap") were published.

In 1995 Skylė started working with the theatre of puppets, fire and music "Miraklis". The leader of Skylė Rokas Radzevičius together with his band created and recorded the soundtrack for two performances of "Miraklis". At that time seven musicians of the band tried their luck as actors in the performance "Šv. Stepono 7 pro memoria" (St. Stephen 7 Pro Memoria) dedicated to the history of a ruined building in the old town of Vilnius. Also in the same year the band was shot in a German feature film "Kaukazo vakaras" ("An Evening in Caucasus") and performed their song "Žydinčių moterų džiaugsmas"( "The Joy of Women in Bloom") in Russian.

In 1996 the band was joined by a very talented singer Aistė Smilgevičiūtė characterized by her strong and unique voice (she represented Lithuania in the Eurovision Song Contest in Jerusalem in 1999).

In 1998 Skylė was officially recognized as the Centre of Creative Initiatives (in 2004 the centre was renamed to the public establishment "Via Artis") and organised two impressive pacifistic festivals "Gėlių naktis" ("The Night of Flowers"), filled with the reminiscence about the ideas of love and peace of the 60s. In 1998 Skylė performed in World Youth Festival in Lisbon.

At the end of the summer and the beginning of autumn of 1999 during the visit to Germany, Skylė participated in an international creative camp. The musical "Dialog Is a Lock" was born at this camp. In the same year Rokas Radzevičius created and together with the band Skylė recorded another soundtrack for a play of "Miraklis" called "Žmogus ir Aušrinė" ("The Man and the Morning Star") which was intended for the celebration of the new millennium.

At the beginning of 2000 Skylė together with Aistė Smilgevičiūtė recorded one of their most successful albums – "Babilonas" ("Babylon"). In 2000, Skylė organized an international youth project called "Uniformos" ("Uniforms") where young people from various European countries created and performed a musical based on the topic of democracy. At the end of the year this musical was performed once again in Vilnius and in Magdeburg simultaneously, connecting the two stages by means of video broadcast on the Internet.

In the summer of 2001 a rock opera named "Jūratė ir Kastytis" ("Jurate and Kastytis") which was created specially for the Sea Festival in Klaipėda was presented to the public. The author of this rock opera is Rokas Radzevičius. The rock opera was recorded with the help of some well-known professional musicians. The main roles were played by famous performers like Marijonas Mikutavičius, Kostas Smoriginas, Olegas Ditkovskis, Vladas Bagdonas and others. Another international project called "Svetimi" ("Aliens") was carried out that summer and in autumn the band recorded the music for the last performance of "Miraklis" in Lithuania called "Vilniaus legendos" (The Legends of Vilnius).

In 2002 the soundtrack of "Jūratė ir Kastytis"("Jurate and Kastytis") was released on CD. Two songs from this album, which were also included into the solo album of Marijonas Mikutavičius after a year, conquered the hearts of listeners and are some of the most welcome songs at the concerts of the band. In autumn of 2002, a music and fire theatrical performance called "Saulės žemė" ("The Land Of The Sun") was produced with the help of some famous artists and musicians from Šiauliai and in collaboration with Šiauliai city municipality.

In the summer of 2003 they stopped their active participation in music projects with young people. The final project was "Tilt" where creative young people from seven countries made ten shows in Lithuania, Slovakia, Germany, and Belgium. In the autumn of the same year one more rock opera created by Rokas Radzevičius showed up. It was called "Žuviaganys" ("Fish Shepherd") which was performed for the first time in Alytus with a great number of artists from this city. From the middle of 2003 till autumn of 2005 the band slowed down its activity, there were only a few acoustic concerts. At that time the attention was turned to the personal projects of Rokas Radzevičius and chamber performances of "Jūratė ir Kastytis" ("Jurate and Kastytis") which were finished in 2006 when this rock opera in the form of a movie was recorded on DVD.

The band was reborn in the autumn of 2005. Skylė prepared a new concert programme, renewed the members and started actively performing in concerts, clubs and festivals. They also refreshed the recording of the album.

In the autumn of 2007 they released their album "Povandeninės kronikos"("The Underwater Chronicles") which delighted the fans of qualitative music. The album was released both on audio CD and on DVD which was recorded during a concert shot in a studio of the Lithuanian National Television. The overflow of awards and the appreciation of the fans gave just a stronger impulse which led to a more active and creative phase in the band's history, refreshing Lithuanian rock music culture and moving it onto a new level.

In 2008 the band was actively performing in concerts and some of the biggest festivals in Lithuania such as "Be2gether" and "Mėnuo Juodaragis" In the final concerts of the tour "Povandeninės kronikos" ("Underwater Chronicles") they played together with a chamber string orchestra in Vilnius and Kaunas.

In 2009 Skylė had two concert tours: Acoustic tour at the beginning of the year (Šiauliai, Klaipėda, Alytus, Panevėžys, Dublin, Kaunas, Marijampolė, Vilnius);

"Sapnų trofėjai" ("Dreams Trophies") presentation tour (Panevėžys, Kaunas, Klaipėda, Šiauliai, Vilnius, Palanga);

In total there were 28 concerts, 5 performances with artists on TV shows, 3 live performances on TV and radio, 4 new publications were released:

1. DVD "Concert in St. Catherine's Church";
2. Exclusive demonstration of future album "Broliai" ("Brothers");
3. CD "Sapnų trofėjai" ("Dreams Trophies");
4. M4. Musical fairy - tale for children "Karalaitė Garbanėlė" ("Princess Kinkle") in the form of the illustrated book with a CD

In 2010 the band started and finished the recordings of its new album. The album "Broliai" ("Brothers") is dedicated to the fighters of Lithuania's freedom (guerillas) with the aim to memorize and honour their resistance activities.

== Trophies ==
- The song "Jūržolių šokis" ("The Dance of The Seaweed’) from the album "Povandeninės kronikos" ("Underwater Chronicles") got the award from radio station "Radiocentras" in the category "Šviežio garso gurkšnis" ("Gulp Of Fresh Sound") in 2007.
- In the "Awards of Lithuania's Alternative Music A.LT" "Povandeninės kronikos" ("Underwater Chronicles") was announced as the best album of 2007 and the band itself was recognized as the best rock band of the year.

The album of the year: Skylė "Povandeninės kronikos" ("Underwater Chronicles")
The best rock (alternative/rock) band/artist of the year: Skylė

- The song "Auksinis ruduo" ("Golden Autumn") (music R. Radzevičius, words A. Smilgevičiūtė) is announced as the winner of LATGA-A (Agency of Lithuanian copyright protection association) Song contest in 2008. Performers A. Smilgevičiūtė and V. Bagdonas.
- Song "Baltas brolis" ("White Brother") from the album "Povandeninės kronikos" ("Underwater Chronicles") was recognised by Lithuania's National Radio listeners as the most popular song of the year 2008.
- Song "Baltas brolis" ("White Brother") from the album "Povandeninės kronikos" ("Underwater Chronicles") in the voting organised by Lithuanian national radio in 2009 got among the TOP 20 of Lithuanian songs of all times.

== Members ==
Aistė Smilgevičiūtė – vocal
Rokas Radzevičius – acoustic guitar, vocal
Mantvydas Kodis – accordion
Kęstutis Drazdauskas – flute
Gediminas Žilys - bass guitar, kanklės
Salvijus Žeimys - percussion

== Discography ==
"Žydinčių moterų džiaugsmas" (1993) ("The Joy of Women in Bloom"), audio tape

- first and very successful band album was dedicated to all woman and contained mostly soft sounding ballads. Few more hard sounding pieces also got into this album.

"Periklių giesmės" (1994) ("The Chants of Periceles"), audio tape

– it is like a set of ballads reflecting the lives of Skylė poetry heroes. The sounding of this album for the first time supplemented with flute and violoncello.

"Kubatūrinė radiacija" (1994) ("Cubage Radiation"), audio tape

– characterized as very heavy sounding of punk rock. During the concerts students started liking this programme.

"1 + 1 = 1" (1995), audio tape

– this lyrical album warmely welcomed the lovers of singing poetry.

"Šv. Stepono 7" (1996) ("St. Steponas7"), audio tape

– music for "Miraklis" performance.

"Saulės kelionė" (1996) ("The Journey Of The Sun"), audio tape

– it is continuous piece of 70 minutes which contains songs of various music styles dedicated to all signs of Zodiak. Texts for these songs were written by famous Lithuanian poet Judita Vaičiūnaitė.

"Lukiškių pieva" (1996) ("Lukiskes Meadow"), audio tape

- Skylė came back to traditional rhythms of rock, reggae and folk so the album ranked the fans flock.

"Geriausios dainos 1991–1997" (1998) ("Best Songs of 1991–1997"), CD

– the set of the best songs Skylė band.

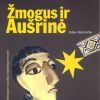
"Žmogus ir Aušrinė" (1999) ("The Man and the Morning Star"), audio tape and CD

– music created for one more performance of "Miraklis" theatre. Literary this musical is based on one of the most interesting myth of Lithuanian mythology – The Morning Star.

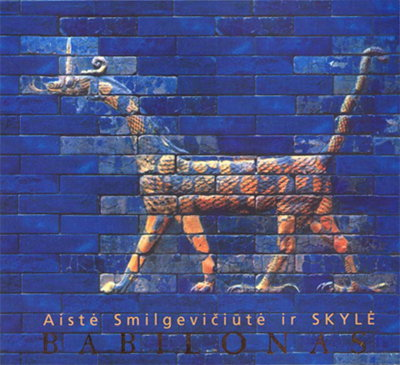
"Babilonas" (2000) ("Babylon"), audio tape and CD

– here dominates typical polystilistics of Skylė band. The songs of this albums are strongly lyrical and softly ironic and it gained popularity. For the first time the main vocal parts shares Rokas and Aistė equally.

"Vilniaus Legendos" (2001) ("The Legends of Vilnius"), CD

– this is music for "Miraklis" performance which was shown at the square of Cathedral in Vilnius on the second day of Christmas in 2001.

"Jūratė ir Kastytis" (2002) ("Jurate and Kastytis"), CD/DVD

– this rock opera continues the well known legend about the love between the mortal man Kastytis and the goddess of the Sea Jūratė. The story ends with the fall of amber palace.

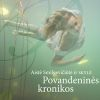
"Povandeninės kronikos" (2007) ("Underwater Chronicles"), CD/DVD

– the newest, the most popular and the most qualitative album.

"Lukiškių pieva" (1996/2008 m.) ("Lukiskes Meadow"), CD

– album recorded in 1996 and released in audio tape format. In 2008 m. "Lukiškių pieva" ("Lukiskes Meadow") was released in CD format.

"Koncertas Šv. Kotrynos bažnyčioje" (2009)( "Concert at St. Kotryna Church"), DVD

– video recording of concert organised in St. Kotryna church together with string quartet on April 7, 2009.

Demonstrational edition of two songs (2009), CD, single

– this is demo version of future album called "Broliai" ("Brothers") which will contain fifteen songs.

"Sapnų trofėjai" (2009) ("Dreams Trophies"), CD

– anthological band album which includes the most characteristic songs from the very beginning of bands establishment till not yet published new songs.

"Broliai" (2010) ("Brothers"), CD

– dedicated to commemorate participants in the Lithuanian struggle for freedom between 1944 and 1953
"Broliai" (2011) ("Brothers"), DVD
-"For the land from which we all have sprung and for those who became the forest. Dedicated to commemorate participants in the Lithuanian struggle for freedom between 1944 and 1953."
."Vilko Vartai" (2015) ("Gates of the Wolf"), CD
