= Sudeikiai =

- Town
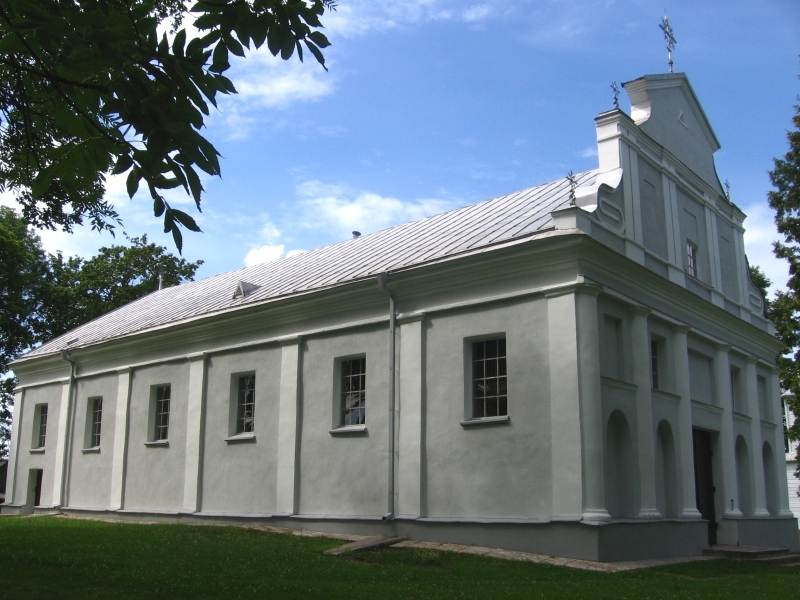
- St. Mary Church

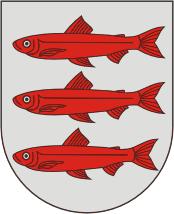
- Seal

- Location within Lithuania
- Coordinates: 55°34′59″N 25°40′52″E
- Country: Lithuania
- County: Utena County
- Municipality: Utena district municipality
- Eldership: Sudeikiai eldership

Population (2011)
  - Total: 349
- Time zone: UTC+2 (EET)
  - Summer (DST): UTC+3 (EEST)

Sudeikiai is a town in Utena County, Lithuania. According to the 2011 census, the town had a population of 349.
