= Xsolla =

American video game commerce company

- Formerly: 2Pay
- Type: Private
- Industry: Fintech
- Founded: 2005; 21 years ago in Perm, Russia
- Founder: Aleksandr Agapitov
- Headquarters: Sherman Oaks, Los Angeles, California, U.S.
- Area served: Global
- Key people: Aleksandr Agapitov (founder, CEO); Chris Hewish (President)
- Number of employees: 2500 (2026)
- Website: xsolla.com

Xsolla is an American financial technology company that makes payment software for video games. It was founded in 2005 in Perm, Russia, by Aleksandr Agapitov. As of 2022, it had 500 employees. The company's core product is Pay Station, a suite of tools for integrating payment systems. It can be used to accept more than 1000+ payment types in more than 200 countries. Xsolla software was used in approximately 2,000 video games in 2021 and the company had revenues of approximately US$100 million.

== History ==
Xsolla was founded in 2005 by Aleksandr Agapitov as 2Pay in Perm, Russia. The company moved its headquarters to Los Angeles, California, in 2010, and was renamed Xsolla the following year. The firm added support for Russian gamers to use cash kiosks to add funds to their Steam accounts using physical currency in 2011, and partnered with ZipZap in 2012 to accept new payments from those without bank accounts.

In 2021, it announced plans to lay off 150 employees following the company's use of artificial intelligence to analyze employee work habits. Agapitov made multiple statements about the layoffs that were received poorly by the public and the press.

Agapitov stepped back from the CEO role in 2022 and Konstantin Golubitsky was appointed to CEO position in February the same year.

The company made a series of acquisitions in the 2020s, including data visualization firm Slemma in 2021 and AcceleratXR, a server technology provider for live service games in 2023.

Ukrainian Minister of Digital Transformation Mykhailo Fedorov called for a boycott of the company that year due to the company continuing to do business in Russia following the Russian invasion of Ukraine. Xsolla leadership said its partners were aware of its operations in Russia and that it would continue to operate in the country while its partners chose to serve Russian gamers. The same year, former Xsolla global accounting vice president Emil Aliyev sued the company for wrongful termination and retaliation against a whistleblower, alleging he was fired after he reported to his superiors that the company had mishandled US$40 million. Xsolla denied the allegations.

In February 2022, Xsolla partners with venture capital company Nazca to form video game venture Joystick Ventures.

Pocket Gamer named Xsolla "Best Service Provider" at its 2022 Mobile Game Awards.

The firm published its first State of Play report in 2023, an analysis of the video game industry.

Agapitov returned as CEO in February 2024 following two years away from the company.

Bloomberg reported in 2024 Aleksandr Agapitov transferred over $100 million from company accounts to personal accounts and back.

== Products ==
Xsolla products were used by 300 game publishers, including Valve Corporation, Gameforge, and Wargaming by 2012 and by 2021, its software was used by 1,500 game companies on more than 2,000 games.

Xsolla Accelerator was launched in 2022 as a program for indie game developers that provides funding for early-stage companies as well as educational programs, and liquidated the parent company of its Russian division, Xsolla Russian Holding LLC. Xsola also updated its Pay Station software in 2022 to allow for easier creation of web shops and raising funds through startup accelerators; and Xsolla Payouts, a system providing payments to content creators. The Payouts update streamlined the payment process. By August 2022, Xsolla Pay Station was used by 1,000 game developers. Xsolla launched new partnerships with Alipay and Adikteev in 2022.

In 2023, Xsolla launched Headless Checkout, software that allows game developers to create custom storefronts in games, and integrated it with Pay Station. It partnered with AppsFlyer to integrate cross-platform analytics into its products and with Mastercard to allow for the use of credit card reward points as a payment method.

In 2024, Xsolla launched Xsolla Wallet, a simplified way to monetize games, partnered with MTN Group and Bharti Airtel to add additional payment options in Africa and PayPay to increase options in Japan, and partnered with analytics company GameAnalytics to integrate its software with Xsolla's web shops. It launched Cross Play, Cross Pay that year as well, which allows game developers to more easily move their games between platforms while accepting payments.

With Curine Ventures, Xsolla opened the Xsolla Curine Academy in Kuala Lumpur in 2024. The academy offers classes for game developers including project management, game design, and graphic art.
