= Molavėnai =

- Village
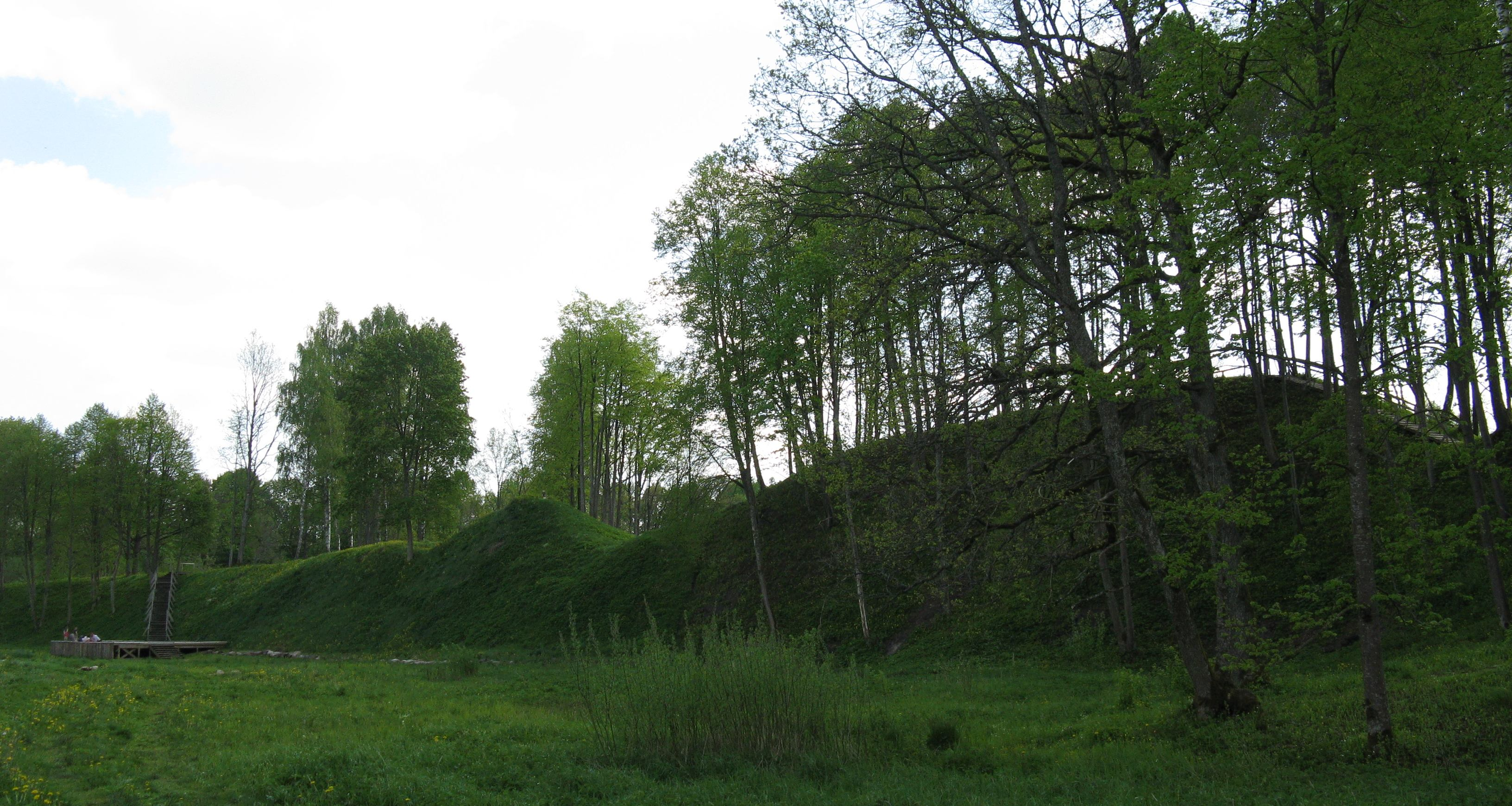
- Molavėnai hill fort, one of the suggested locations of Pilėnai

- Location of Molavėnai
- Coordinates: 55°27′0″N 22°53′0″E
- Country: Lithuania
- Ethnographic region: Samogitia
- County: Kaunas County
- Municipality: Raseiniai district municipality
- Eldership: Nemakščiai eldership

Population (2011)
  - Total: 11
- Time zone: UTC+2 (EET)
  - Summer (DST): UTC+3 (EEST)

Molavėnai is a small village in the Raseiniai district municipality, Lithuania.

Two hill forts are located in the vicinity of the village. Two nature monuments are protected by the state – an old oak tree near one of the hill forts and a stone called Mokas. According to the 2001 census, the village has a population of 11 people.

Molavėnų I hill fort was first erected in the 1st century and consisted of defensive fortifications and a wooden fort. The site is located on a long (350 m), narrow projection into a bend of the river Šešuvis. The site is protected on the northeast and southwest by steep slopes, marshy banks, and the river. To protect it on the northwest, the only known Lithuanian double defensive system that uses earth and wooden outworks was erected on the projection’s neck. In all, it consisted of five ditches, four earthworks, and three levelled courtyards. A fortified settlement was built at the southeast end. In addition, the levelled hilltop areas were surrounded by palisades of sharpened poles. Artefacts dating from the early 1st century to the early second millennium were found during 21st century excavations. The site was eventually abandoned due to continued erosion and the shrinking hilltop.

Molavėnų II hill fort was built 400 m (1,300 ft) upstream in the 12th century on another projection at the confluence of the river Šešuvis and its tributary, the Jaujupis. Only the northeast and east sides were not protected by natural defences and so were instead guarded by a series of four earthworks and four ditches. A 20 m-long (66 ft) earthwork with a corresponding ditch was constructed on the southwest slope. The flat hilltop was ringed by a wooden defensive wall. A tower was erected on the big earthwork, and wooden palisades on the other earthworks. A 2009 excavation discovered pottery dating to the 12th–14th centuries. Dry stone revetting was also found in one ditch.

== Sources ==
‘Molavėnų I piliakalnis/ Molavėnų II piliakalnis’, a flyer published in Lithuanian by the Raseiniai District Municipality Administration, the Society of the Lithuanian Archaeology, and the Cultural Heritage Salvage Group.
