= Krauka =

- Origin: Denmark & Iceland
- Genres: Folk; Nordic; Roots; Viking folk
- Years active: 1999–present
- Label: Bandcamp
- Members: Guðjón Rúdolf Guðmundsson; Aksel Striim; Jens Villy Pedersen
- Past members: Jørgen Holm; Søren Andersen; Søren Sol Koldsen-Zederkof
- Website: https://krauka.bandcamp.com/

Krauka is a Viking folk band from Denmark formed in 1999. "Krauka's music is played on instruments reconstructed after archaeological findings, but modern elements interwine, creating an intense and often wild atmosphere inspired by the sagas and the Nordic forces of nature".

== Discography ==
- Vikinga Seidur 2002;
- Stiklur 2004;
- Bylur 2006;
- Oðinn 2009;
- Gjörningur 2012;
- Timinn Tifar 2015;
- Loka Leikur 2018;
- Eftir Orustuna 2019
- Paskadisaeigenmenn 2021
- Heimkoma 2024
- Dynjandi a Islandi 2025
