= Aistė Smilgevičiūtė =

Lithuanian singer (born 1977)

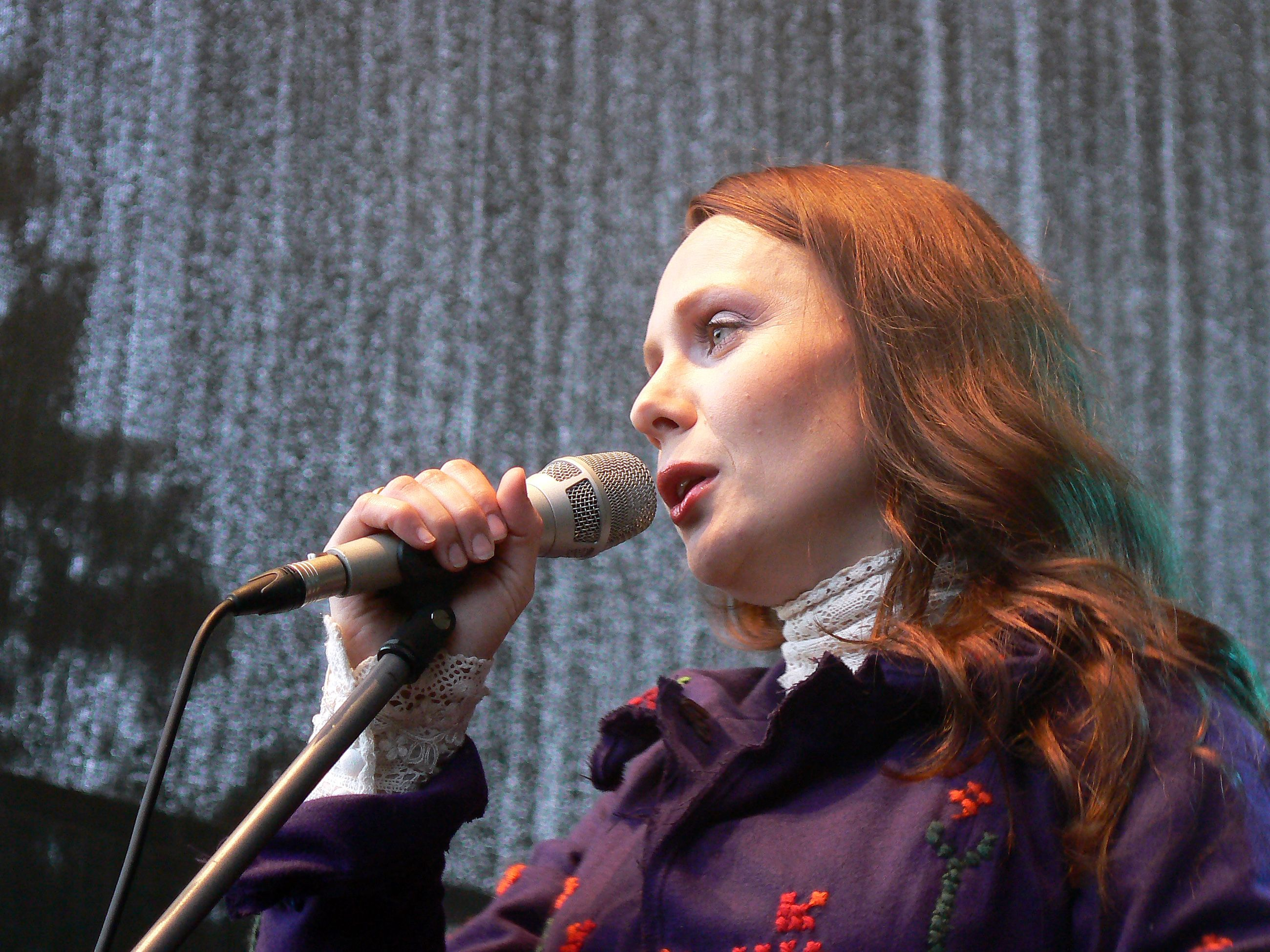

Background information
- Also known as: Aistė
- Born: Aistė Smilgevičiūtė; 29 October 1977 (age 48)
- Origin: Plungė, Lithuania
- Genres: Folk, jazz, pop rock
- Occupations: Vocalist, lyricist, songwriter
- Label: Via Artis
- Member of: Skylė
- Website: http://www.skyle.lt/naujas/

Aistė Smilgevičiūtė (born 29 October 1977) is a Lithuanian singer. She performs folk music, jazz, pop rock, and other kinds of alternative music. Since 1996, Smilgevičiūtė has been a member of the music band "Skylė".

Smilgevičiūtė was born in Plungė, and graduated with a degree in Classical Philology from Vilnius University.

Smilgevičiūtė participated as a Lithuanian contestant in the Eurovision Song Contest 1999, held in Israel, singing a modern folk song, "Strazdas" ("Song Thrush"), in the Samogitian dialect. This song finished in 20th place in the competition, with 13 points.

== Discography ==
- Aistė po vandeniu (Aistė Under Water, 1996)
- Sakmė apie laumę Martyną (Tale About Pixie Martyna, 1996)
- Strazdas (Thrush, 1999, single)
- Tavo žvaigždė (Your Star, 2000, single)
- Babilonas (Babylon, 2000)
- Užupio himnas (Hymn of Užupis, 2001)
- Nepamirštoms žvaigždėms (To Unforgotten Stars, 2003)
- Povandeninės kronikos (Underwater Chronicles, 2007)
- Sapnų trofėjai (Trophies of Dreams, 2009)
- Broliai (Brothers, 2010)
- Vilko Vartai (Gates of the Wolf, 2015)
- Dūšelės (2016)

Awards and achievements
Preceded by Ovidijus Vyšniauskas with "Lopšinė mylimai"	Lithuania in the Eurovision Song Contest; 1999	Succeeded by Skamp with "You Got Style"
