= Vozrozhdeniye =

Vozrozhdeniye (Russian: Возрожде́ние) is a Russian word, literally meaning "Renaissance". Vozrozhdeniye may also refer to:

== Locations ==
- Vozrozhdeniye, Leningrad Oblast
- Vozrozhdeniye, Vologda Oblast
- Vozrozhdeniye, Voronezh Oblast
- Vozrozhdeniya Island

== Media ==
- Vozrozhdeniye (album) by Arkona
- Vozrojdénie, a Russian-language newspaper published from France
- Vozrozhdeniye, an entry in Brezhnev's trilogy

== See also ==
- Vazrazhdane (disambiguation), the equivalent Bulgarian-language term
- Vidrodzhennia (disambiguation), the equivalent Ukrainian-language term
