= Zhizn Vo Slavu =

Zhizn vo Slavu (Жизнь во славу)
- CD cover

Live album by Arkona
- Released: 1 March 2006 (CD); 17 March 2006 (DVD)
- Recorded: 23 October 2005 at the Relax club in Moscow
- Genre: Folk metal
- Length: 73:24 (CD); 52:08 (DVD)
- Label: Sound Age Production

Arkona chronology
Vo Slavu Velikim! (Во славу великим!) (2005)	Zhizn vo Slavu (Жизнь во славу) (2006)	Ot Serdtsa k Nebu (От сердца к небу) (2007)

Zhizn vo Slavu (Жизнь во славу)
- DVD cover

Zhizn vo Slavu (Russian: Жизнь во славу, lit. 'Life for Glory') is the first live CD / DVD by the Russian folk metal band Arkona. It was released on 1/16 March 2006 through Sound Age Production.

== Track listing ==
CD
No.	Title	Translation	Length
1.	"Intro (Kolomiyka)" (Интро (Коломыйка))		1:30
2.	"Skvoz Tuman Vekov" (Сквозь туман веков)	Through the Mist of Ages	5:23
3.	"Po Syroy Zemle" (По сырой земле)	On the Moist Earth	7:47
4.	"Maslenitsa" (Масленица)		3:29
5.	"Chiornye Debri Voyny" (Чёрные дебри войны)	Black Depths of War	5:09
6.	"Tuman Yarom" (Туман яром)		3:00
7.	"Gnev Vremen" (Гнев времён)	Wrath of Times	5:25
8.	"Po Zverinym Tropam" (По звериным тропам)	On the Animals' Paths	8:21
9.	"Rus" (Русь)		6:29
10.	"Vosstanie Roda" (Восстание рода)	Rod's Uprising	5:44
11.	"Oy To Ne Vecher..." (Ой то не вечер...)	Oh, That's Not Evening	4:21
12.	"Kolyada (bonus)" (Коляда)		6:40
13.	"Solntsevorot (bonus)" (Солнцеворот)	Solstice	3:39
14.	"Rus (bonus)" (Русь)		6:27

The tracks 12–14 are a re-release of the 2002 demo Rus.

DVD
No.	Title	Translation	Length
1.	"Skvoz Tuman Vekov" (Сквозь туман веков)	Through the Mist of Ages	5:07
2.	"Po Syroy Zemle" (По сырой земле)	On the Moist Earth	7:42
3.	"Maslenitsa" (Масленица)		2:53
4.	"Chiornye Debri Voyny" (Чёрные дебри войны)	Black Depths of War	4:35
5.	"Tuman Yarom" (Туман яром)		2:57
6.	"Gnev Vremen" (Гнев времён)	Wrath of Times	5:18
7.	"Po Zverinym Tropam" (По звериным тропам)	On the Animals' Paths	3:19
8.	"Zabava" (Забава)	Drinking game	4:37
9.	"Rus" (Русь)		6:55
10.	"Oy To Ne Vecher..." (Ой то не вечер...)	Oh, That's Not Evening	3:14
11.	"Vosstanie Roda" (Восстание рода)	Rod's Uprising	5:30

== Credits ==
- Masha "Scream" Arkhipova – vocals
- Sergei "Lazar" Atrashkevich – guitars
- Ruslan "Kniaz" Oganyan – bass
- Vlad "Artist" Sokolov – drums

Production

- Sergey Ivanov – photography
- Evgeny Izmaylov – recording

Rus' demo credits (tracks 12–14)

- Masha "Scream" Arkhipova – vocals
- Evgeny Borzov – bass
- Alexander "Warlock" – drums
- Evgeny Knyazev – guitars
- Ilya Bogatyryov – guitars
- Olga Loginova – keyboards
- Sergei "Lazar" Atrashkevich – recording, mixing, mastering
