= Stenka na stenku =

Stenka na Stenku

EP by Arkona
- Released: 25 May 2011
- Recorded: September 2010 at CDM Records and Gigant Records
- Genre: Folk metal, Pagan metal
- Length: 23:50
- Label: Napalm Records
- Producer: Sergei "Lazar", Masha "Scream"

Arkona chronology
Goi, Rode, Goi! (2009)	Stenka na Stenku (2011)	Slovo (2011)

Стенка на Стенку (Stenka na Stenku) is an EP by the Russian folk metal band Arkona. It was released on 25 May 2011 through Napalm Records.

== Track listing ==
No.	Title	Lyrics	Music	Translation	Length
1.	"Stenka na Stenku" (Стенка на стенку)	Masha "Scream"	Masha "Scream"	A Wall Against a Wall	2:31
2.	"Valenki" (Валенки)	Traditional	Traditional	Valenki	3:04
3.	"Goi, Rode, Goi! (Acoustic Version)" (Гой, Роде, гой!)	Masha "Scream"	Masha "Scream"	Hail, Rod, Hail!	5:35
4.	"Skål!"	Varg	Masha "Scream"	Cheers!	2:28
5.	"Duren'" (Дурень)	Svarga	Svarga	The Fool	6:27
6.	"Novyi Mir (Ođđa Máilbmi) (Shaman cover)" (Новый мир)	Masha "Scream"	Shaman	The New World	3:45
Total length:					23:50

== Album description ==
The title track is about a type of group fist fights once popular in Russia, called Wall Against wall. This topic is reflected in the EP's cover and the video which was shot for the track.

Stenka na stenku was featured on the group's album Slovo, while the rest are non-album tracks.

== Personnel ==
- Masha "Scream" – vocals, keyboards, tambourine, khomuz, shaman drums, choir, producer
- Sergei "Lazar" Atrashkevich – guitars, acoustic guitars, balalaika, producer, mixing, mastering
- Vladimir "Volk" Reshetnikov – gaita gallega, blockflute, whistle, zhaleyka
- Ruslan "Kniaz" Oganyan – bass
- Vlad "Artist" Sokolov – drums

=== Guest musicians ===
- Aleksandr Oleynikov – accordion
- Ilya "Wolfenhirt" Gura, Aleksandr "Shmel" Shvilyov – choir ("Stenka na Stenku")
- Irina Lisa – cello ("Goi, Rode, Goi!")
- Philipp "Freki" Seiler – guest vocals ("Skål!")
