= Vo slavu velikim! =

Vo Slavu Velikim! (Во славу Великим!)

Studio album by Arkona
- Released: 24 September 2005
- Recorded: 16 June – 27 August 2005
- Studios: CDM Records Studio (Moscow, Russia)
- Genres: Folk metal, pagan metal
- Length: 61:26
- Label: Sound Age Production
- Producers: Masha "Scream"; Sergei "Lazar"

Arkona chronology
Lepta (Лепта) (2004)	Vo Slavu Velikim! (Во славу Великим!) (2005)	Zhizn vo Slavu (Жизнь во славу) (2006)

Vo Slavu Velikim! (Во славу Великим!) is the third full-length album by the Russian folk metal band Arkona. It was released on 24 September 2005 through Sound Age Production. It was re-released in 2008 by Vic Records.

== Reception ==
Professional ratings
Review scores
Source	Rating
Sonic Seducer	very favourable

A review of the 2008 re-release by German magazine Sonic Seducer was very favourable, calling the album a proof that Arkona were among "the very best and the most aesthetic" pagan folk metal bands world-wide. The reviewer praised singer Maria Arkhipova's voice as well as the dynamic and highly melodic compositions. The review also discussed the album's combination of folk and metal elements.

== Track listing ==
No.	Title	Original Russian titles	Length
1.	"Intro (Kolymiyka Ukrainian folk song)"	"Интро (Коломийка)"	1:31
2.	"Skvoz Tuman Vekov (Through the Mist of Ages)"	"Сквозь туман веков"	5:10
3.	"Rus Iznachalnaya (Primordial Rus)"	"Русь изначальная"	5:43
4.	"Vo Slavu Velikim! (For Glory of the Great)"	"Во славу великим!"	5:37
5.	"Po Syroi Zemle (On the Moist Earth)"	"По сырой земле"	7:39
6.	"Tuman Yarom" (Ukrainian folk song)	"Туман Яром"	2:50
7.	"Zov Bitvy (Call of the Battle)"	"Зов битвы"	4:08
8.	"Vedy Proshlovo (Vedas of the Past)"	"Веды прошлого"	5:21
9.	"Velikden (Easter)"	"Великдень"	0:56
10.	"Gnev Vremen (The Wrath of Times)"	"Гнев времен"	5:11
11.	"Na Svarogovoi Doroge (On a Svarog's Road)"	"На Свароговой дороге"	5:09
12.	"Vyidi, Vyidi Ivanku..." (Ukrainian folk song)	"Выйди, выйди Иванку..."	1:12
13.	"Vosstaniye Roda (Rod's Uprising)"	"Восстание Рода"	5:27
14.	"Sila Slavnykh (By Virtue of the Glorious)"	"Сила Славных"	5:32

== Credits ==
=== Arkona ===
- Masha "Scream" – vocals, choir, tambourine, Jew's harp, keyboards, acoustic guitar (4), lyrics (except 6, 9, 12), songwriting (2–5, 8, 10, 11, 13, 14), producer
- Sergei "Lazar" Atrashkevich – guitars, acoustic guitars, choir, producer
- Ruslan "Kniaz" Oganyan – bass
- Vlad "Artist" Sokolov – drums, percussion

Additional musicians

- Vladimir Cherepovsky – ocarina, bagpipes, whistles, sopilka, Jew's harp (6, 11), songwriting (9)
- Igor "Hurry" Angioz – accordion
- Andrey Karasyov – violin
- Ilya "Wolfenhirt" Gura – vocals, choir
- Alexey "Nightbird" Solovyov – guest vocals (13)
- Roman "Arsafes" Iskorostensky – songwriting (7)

Production

- W. Smerdulak – artwork, layout
