= Slovo (album) =

Slovo Слово

Studio album by Arkona
- Released: 26 August 2011
- Recorded: CDM-Records Studio, Moscow, Russia, November 2010 – April 2011
- Genre: Pagan metal, folk metal
- Length: 57:24
- Language: Russian
- Label: Napalm
- Producer: Masha "Scream", Sergei "Lazar" Atraschkevic

Arkona chronology
Stenka na stenku (2011)	Slovo; Слово (2011)	Yav (2014)

Slovo (Russian: Слово, A Word) is the sixth full-length album by the Russian pagan metal band Arkona. It was released on 26 August 2011 through Napalm Records. An academical choir and a chamber orchestra were used on the album.

== Reception ==
Professional ratings
Review scores
Source	Rating
Blistering	(7.5/10)
Jukebox Metal	3.5/5 stars
Metal Hammer (GER)	(5/7)
Sputnikmusic	3.5/5 stars
Metal Underground	3/5 stars

A review by the webzine Jukebox Metal called the album "imaginative and lively" but criticised a lack in musical consistency and identity. Metal Hammer Germany was more positive and lauded the evolution in the band's musical quality, writing that the songs were more complex and sophisticated than those on the previous studio album Goi, Rode, Goi!.

== Track listing ==
All tracks are written by Masha "Scream", except "Zimushka".

No.	Title	Writer(s)	Translation	Length
1.	"Az" (Азъ)		I	2:12
2.	"Arkaim" (Аркаим)		Arkaim	5:54
3.	"Bol’no Mne" (Больно Мне)		I'm in Pain	5:43
4.	"Leshiy" (Леший)		Leshiy	4:21
5.	"Zaklyatye" (Заклятье)		Incantation	5:16
6.	"Predok" (Предок)		Ancestor	2:14
7.	"Nikogda" (Никогда)		Never	4:44
8.	"Tam, za tumanami" (Там, за туманами)		There, Beyond the Mists	3:53
9.	"Potomok" (Потомок)		Descendant	0:55
10.	"Slovo" (Слово)		Word	5:28
11.	"Odna" (Одна)		Alone	5:52
12.	"Vo moyom sadochke..." (Во моём садочке...)		In My Garden...	5:10
13.	"Stenka na stenku" (Стенка на стенку)		Wall to Wall	2:36
14.	"Zimushka" (Зимушка)	traditional	Winter	5:50
Total length:				57:24

== Personnel ==
=== Arkona ===
- Masha "Scream" – vocals, keyboards, tambourine, khomus, shaman drums, shaker, choirs, acoustic guitar ("Bol’no mne"), producing, engineering, mixing, arrangements
- Sergei "Lazar" Atrashkevich – lead guitars, acoustic guitars, balalaika, additional vocals ("Arkaim", "Nikogda"), producing, engineering, mixing, mastering
- Ruslan "Kniaz" Oganyan – bass
- Vlad "Artist" Sokolov – drums, keyboards
- Vladimir "Volk" Reshetnikov – gaita gallega, tin whistle, low whistle, sopilka, zhaleika, blockflute, hurdy-gurdy

=== Additional musicians ===
- Chamber Orchestra of Kazan State Conservatory N.G. Zhiganov (under the direction of Darya Ivanova)
- The choir of Moscow State Conservatory students (conducted by Alexandra Sidorova)
- Meri Tadić – violin ("Arkaim", "Nikogda", "Slovo", "Vo moiom sadochke...")
- Anna Kalinovskaya – symbaly, cymbals ("Arkaim", "Bol'no mne", "Leshiy", "Zakliatie", "Tam za tumanami", "Slovo")
- Ilya "Hurry" Angioz – accordion ("Leshiy")
- Pavel Lukoyanov – gusli ("Vo moiom sadochke...")
- Radimir Atrashkevich – narration ("Potomok")
- Aleksandr Oleynikov – accordion ("Stenka na Stenku")
- Ilya "Wolfenhirt" Gura, Aleksandr "Shmel" Shvilyov – choir ("Stenka na Stenku")
- Tatiana Narishkina, Dariana Antipova (Vedan’ Kolod’) – vocals ("Zimushka")

Production

- W. Smerdulak – design
- Stanislav "Mendor" Drozdov – photography
- Kris Verwimp – artwork
