= Khram (album) =

Khram Храм

Studio album by Arkona
- Released: 19 January 2018
- Recorded: June – August 2017
- Studio: CDM Records Studio
- Genre: Black metal, pagan metal, folk metal
- Length: 74:05
- Language: Russian
- Label: Napalm Records
- Producer: Sergei "Lazar" and Masha "Scream"

Arkona chronology
Yav (2014)	Khram; Храм (2018)	Kob' (2023)

Khram (Russian: «Храм») is the eighth full-length album by the Russian pagan metal band Arkona. It was released on 19 January 2018 through Napalm Records. The title means "Temple" in English.

== Reception ==
Professional ratings
Review scores
Source	Rating
Metal Hammer Germany	5/7
Teamrock	4/5 stars
Metal Storm	8.7/10

Metal Hammer Germany's reviewer wrote that Arkona continued with the same intensity that was known from their previous albums. Influences of Black metal and "unusual melodies" were, however, noted in this release. According to the Sonic Seducer, the album shows the natural development of the band in terms of vocals, composition and instrumentation. Thematically, it constitutes a "tribute to the ... worship of flora and fauna". A review by Teamrock called Khram "wildly adventurous" and noted Arkona's sincere expression of their pagan ideals.

== Track listing ==
No.	Title	Translation	Length
1.	"Mantra (Intro)" (Мантра (Интро))	Mantra (Intro)	3:51
2.	"Shtorm" (Шторм)	Storm	5:12
3.	"Tseluya zhizn" (Целуя жизнь)	Kissing Life	17:11
4.	"Rebyonok bez imeni" (Ребёнок без имени)	Nameless Child	11:58
5.	"Khram" (Храм)	Temple	9:50
6.	"V pogonye za beloy tenyu" (В погоне за белой тенью)	In Pursuit of a White Shadow	7:49
7.	"V ladonyakh bogov" (В ладонях богов)	In Gods' Palms	9:16
8.	"Volchitsa" (Волчица; Vedan Kolod cover)	She-wolf	8:03
9.	"Mantra (Outro)" (Мантра (Оутро))	Mantra (Outro)	0:55
Total length:			74:05

== Personnel ==
=== Arkona ===
- Masha "Scream" – vocals, keyboards, percussion, songwriting, lyrics, producer
- Sergei "Lazar" Atrashkevich – guitars, recording, producer, mixing, mastering
- Ruslan "Kniaz" Oganyan – bass
- Andrey Ischenko – drums
- Vladimir "Volk" Reshetnikov – gaita gallega, recorder, tin whistle, low whistle, sopilka

Additional musicians

- Anatoly Pakhalenko – vocals on "Mantra (Intro)"
- Alexander Kozlovsky – cello on "Tseluya zhizn"
- Alexander – tuba on "Tseluya zhizn"
- Radimir Atrashkevich, Bogdan Atrashkevich – child narration on "Tseluya zhizn"
- Robert Engstrand – piano on "V ladonyah bogov"

Production

- Sergey Pavlov – lyrics translation
- Rotten Phantom – artwork
- Vladimir Chebakov – design
- Ele Kachalina – photography
