= Kobs =

Kobs is a surname. Notable people with the surname include:

- John Kobs (1898–1968), American athlete and coach
- Karsten Kobs (born 1971), German hammer thrower

== See also ==
- KOB (disambiguation)
- Drayton McLane Baseball Stadium at John H. Kobs Field, baseball stadium in East Lansing, Michigan
