= Goi, Rode, Goi! =

Goi, Rode, Goi! Гой, Роде, Гой!

Studio album by Arkona
- Released: 28 October 2009
- Recorded: October 2008 – May 2009
- Studio: CDM Records, Gigant Records (Moscow, Russia), Astia Studios (Lappeenranta, Finland)
- Genre: Pagan metal, folk metal
- Length: 79:39
- Language: Russian
- Label: Napalm Records
- Producer: Masha "Scream", Sergei "Lazar"

Arkona chronology
Noch Velesova (Ночь Велесова) (2008)	Goi, Rode, Goi! Гой, Роде, Гой! (2009)	Stenka na Stenku (2011)

Goi, Rode, Goi! (Russian: Гой, Роде, Гой!) is the fifth full-length album by the Russian pagan metal band Arkona. It was released on 28 October 2009 through Napalm Records. "Goy, Rode, Goy!" means "Hail, Rod, Hail!". Rod is the Slavic Great God, Father of the Universe.

The album has a large cast of guest vocalists and musicians, most notably on the track "Na Moyey Zemle" which features vocalists from Månegarm of Sweden, Obtest of Lithuania, Menhir of Germany, Skyforger of Latvia, and Heidevolk of the Netherlands. Each sings in their native language, playing the role of warriors from that region describing their homeland to a traveler.

The album is one of the band's few releases on limited edition double-LP, released in a hand-numbered edition of 500. The album is packaged in a gatefold with plain white inner sleeves and pressed in Germany. The album reverses the order of two songs "Pritcha" and "Na Moey Zemle" in comparison to the CD version, leaving four songs to each side of a record except for side B which has only the two.

== Reception ==
Professional ratings
Review scores
Source	Rating
About.com	4/5 stars
Kerrang!	3/5 stars
Metal Hammer (Germany)	5/7
Sonic Seducer	favourable

The album received positive international reviews. About.com marked a combination of powerful vocals with deep and dynamic compositions but observed a mostly light-hearted atmosphere reminiscent of Finnish humppa metal acts like Finntroll and Korpiklaani. The reviewer rated Arkona as one of the best pagan bands.

The German Sonic Seducer wrote that this album was more epic and more orchestral but also more playful than previous releases. Metal Hammer Germany lauded singer Arkhipova's vocal range and the consequent traditionally Russian melody lines.

The album was favourably reviewed by Kerrang! which emphasized that, unlike many in this subgenre, Arkona "are genuine pagans and formed this band in an effort to mirror their philosophies." "The title-track and "Nevidal" provide galloping warrior metal, while the bouncy "Yarilo" is Jolly Roger flying Turisas-style fun that sadly clock in at less than three minutes. It's sung entirely in Russian, and is, bizarrely, all the better for it," reviewer Steve Beebee argued, giving it a 3 out of 5K's rating.

== Track listing ==
All lyrics written by Maria Arkhipova, except on the song "Na moey zemle", written by Arkona and the members of groups Månegarm, Obtest, Menhir, Skyforger and Heidevolk. All music written by Maria Arkhipova, except on the song "Korochun", written by Vladimir "Volk".

No.	Title	Translation	Length
1.	"Goi, Rode, Goi!" (Гой, Роде, Гой!)	Hail, Rod, Hail!	6:13
2.	"Tropoyu Nevedannoy" (Тропою неведанной)	On the Unknown Trail	6:24
3.	"Nevidal" (Невидаль)	The Wonder	4:34
4.	"Na Moyey Zemle" (На моей земле)	In My Land	15:10
5.	"Pritcha" (Притча)	The Parable	0:54
6.	"V Tsepyakh Drevney Tayny" (В цепях древней Тайны)	In the Chains of an Ancient Mystery	6:26
7.	"Yarilo" (Ярило)	Yarilo	2:31
8.	"Liki Bessmertnykh Bogov" (Лики бессмертных Богов)	Faces of Immortal Gods	5:19
9.	"Kolo Navi" (Коло Нави)	Kolo of Nav	4:18
10.	"Korochun" (Корочун)	Korochun	2:11
11.	"Pamyat" (Память)	Memory	5:46
12.	"Kupalets" (Купалец)	Kupalets	2:49
13.	"Arkona" (Аркона)	Arkona	6:36
14.	"Nebo Khmuroye, Tuchi Mrachnyye" (Небо Хмурое, Тучи Мрачные)	Sullen Sky, Gloomy Clouds	10:28
Total length:			79:39

== Personnel ==
=== Arkona ===
- Masha "Scream" – lead vocals, keyboards, tambourine, shaker, komuz, songwriting, lyrics, producer
- Sergei "Lazar" Atrashkevich – guitars, balalaika, komuz, yakut mouth harp ("Korochun"), producer, mixing, mastering
- Ruslan "Kniaz" Oganyan – bass
- Vlad "Artist" Sokolov – drums

=== Additional musicians ===
- Vladimir Cherepovskiy – bagpipes, tin whistle, low whistle, recorder, ocarina, flute, zhaleyka, sopilka
- Alexander Oleynikov – accordion
- Alexsandr "Shmel" Shvilyov – choir
- Ilya "Wolfenhirt" Gura – choir
- Cosmin "Hultanu" Duduc – Tulnic ("Goi, Rode, goi!")
- Erik Grawsiö (Månegarm), Deivis Andrejevas, Evaldas Babenskas (Obtest), Pēteris Kvetkovskis, Edgars Grabovskis (Skyforger), Heiko Gerull (Menhir), Joris van Gelre, Mark Splintervuyscht (Heidevolk) – guest vocals ("Na Moey Zemle")
- Kaspars Bārbals (Skyforger) – kokle ("Na Moey Zemle")
- Janne Liljeqvist (Månegarm) – flute, violin ("Na Moey Zemle")
- Vasily Derevyanniy – domra ("Yarilo", "Nebo hmuroe tuchi mrachniye")
- Vladimir "Volk" Reshetnikov – bagpipes, recorder, songwriting ("Korochun")
- Dmitriy "Vetrodar" Kuznetsov – mandolin ("Nebo Hmuroe, Tuchi Mrachniye")

Production

- Aleksandr Kozlovskiy – string quartet direction
- Sofia Sultanova – choir conductor
- Kris Verwimp – cover art
- W. Smerdulak – design
- Yuri Eremin – photography
- Jan Yrlund – editing
