= Maria Arkhipova =

Russian heavy metal vocalist (born 1983)

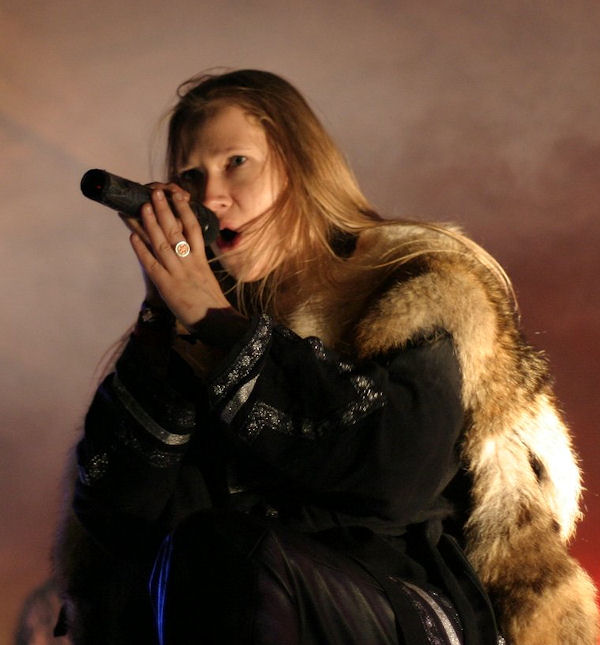

Background information
- Birth name: Maria Arkhipova
- Also known as: Masha Scream, Masha Arhipova
- Born: 9 January 1983 (age 42); Dolgoprydniy , USSR
- Genres: Black metal, folk metal
- Occupation(s): Singer, songwriter
- Years active: 2000–present
- Labels: Napalm Records
- Member of: Arkona

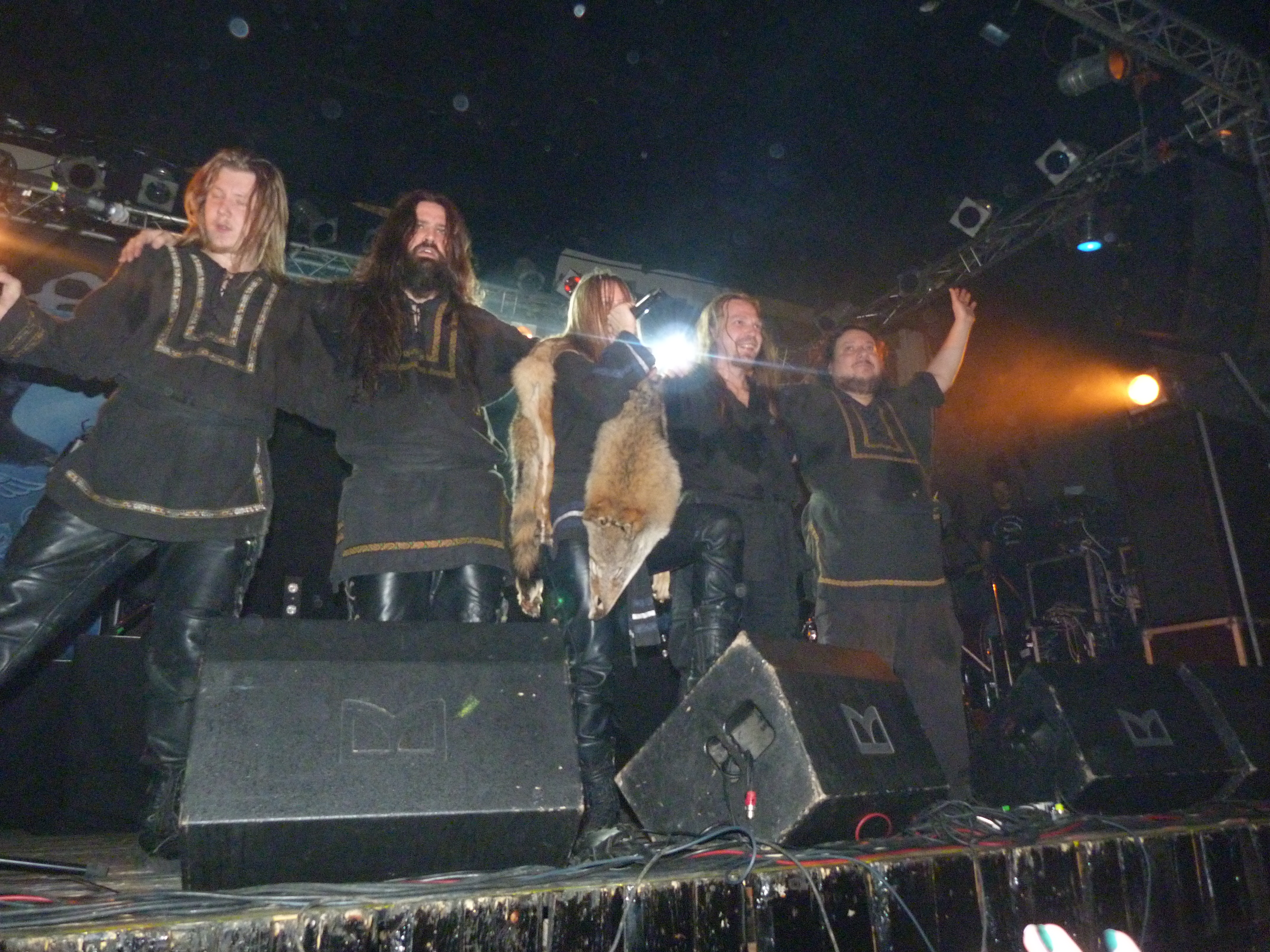
Arkona – Budapest, 2014

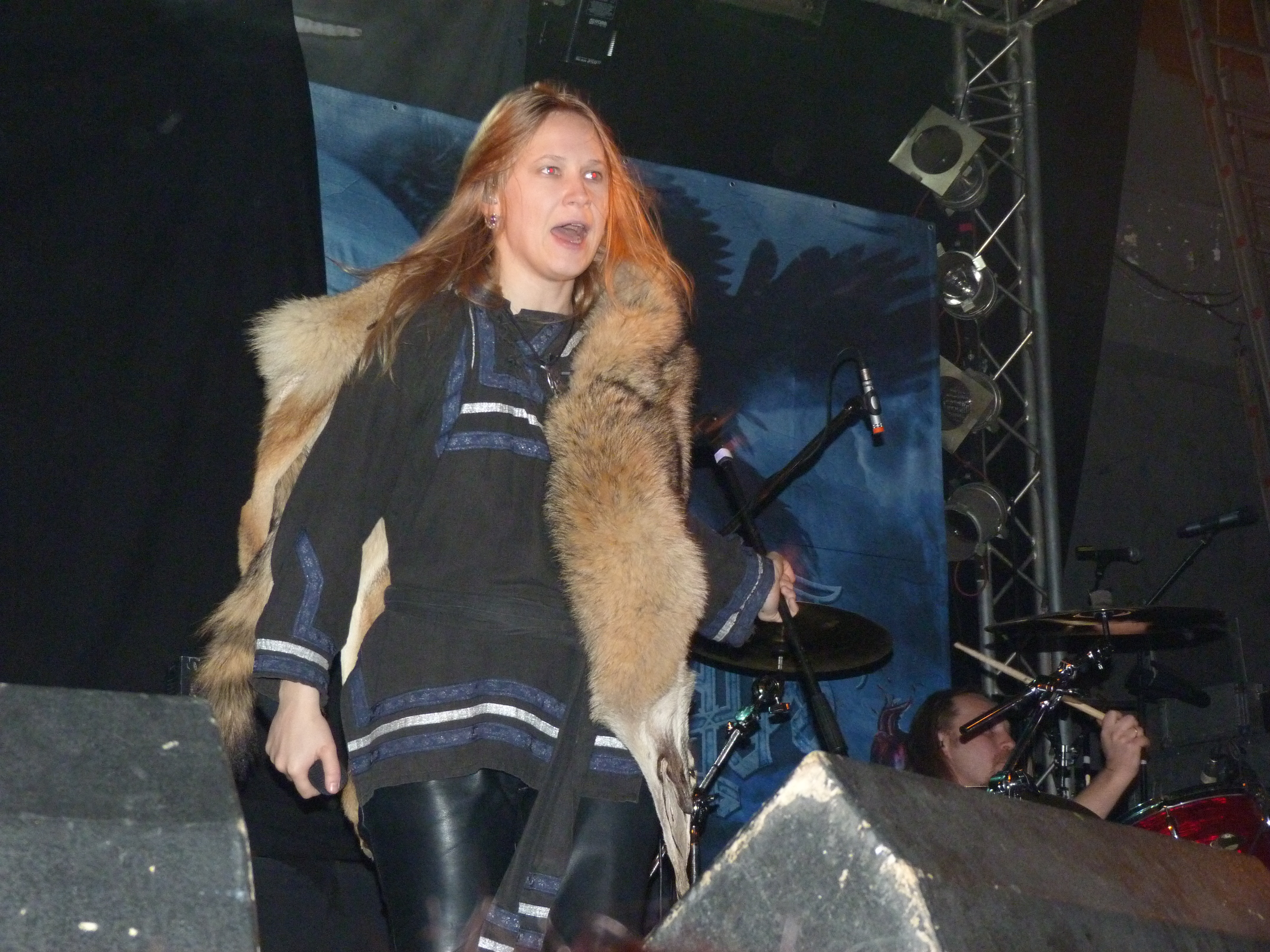
Maria 'Masha Scream' Arhipova

Maria Arkhipova (Russian: Мари́я Архи́пова; born 9 January 1983), known by her stage name as Masha Scream, is a Russian metal musician from Moscow. She is the founder, vocalist and main songwriter of the folk metal band Arkona. She has also played in other bands such as Nargathrond.

== Personal life ==
Arkhipova is married to fellow band member Sergei "Lazar" Atrashkevich with whom she has two children.

== Discography ==
=== With Arkona ===
==== Studio albums ====
- Vozrozhdeniye (2004)
- Lepta (2004)
- Vo Slavu Velikim! (2005)
- Ot Serdtsa K Nebu (2007)
- Goi, Rode, Goi! (2009)
- Stenka Na Stenku (2011, EP)
- Slovo (2011)
- Yav (2014)
- Khram (2018)
- Kob' (2023)

==== Live albums / DVDs ====
- Zhizn Vo Slavu (2006)
- Noch Velesova (2009)

=== With Nargathrond ===
==== Studio albums ====
- Carnal Lust and Wolfen Hunger (2000)
- ...For We Blessed This World With Plagues (2002)
- Inevitability (2004)

=== Guest appearances ===
Arkhipova appeared as a guest vocalist on Svarga's first two albums Ogni na Kurganah and There, Where Woods Doze.... She also appeared on Ancestral Volkhves' second studio album Perun Do Vas!!! and on Percival (band) "Wodnik" from album Svantevit.
