= Noch Velesova =

Noch Velesova (Ночь Велесова)

Live album by Arkona
- Released: 11 February 2009
- Recorded: 31 October 2007 at the Tochka club in Moscow
- Genre: Pagan metal Folk metal
- Length: 144:48
- Label: Sound Age Production; Napalm Records

Arkona chronology
Ot Serdtsa k Nebu (От сердца к небу) (2007)	Noch Velesova (Ночь Велесова) (2009)	Goi, Rode, Goi! (Гой, Роде, Гой!) (2009)

Noch Velesova (Ночь Велесова - Night of Veles) is the second live album by the Russian pagan / folk metal band Arkona. It was released on 11 February 2009 through Sound Age Production in Russia and in May–June 2009 through Napalm Records worldwide.

== Track listing ==
Disc one
No.	Title	Original Russian titles	Length
1.	"Intro"		00:58
2.	"Pokrovy Nebesnogo Startsa (Shrouds of Celestial Sage)"	"Покровы Небесного Старца"	04:24
3.	"Goy, Kupala!!! (Hey, Kupala)"	"Гой, Купала!!!"	03:40
4.	"Ot Serdtsa k Nebu (From the Heart to the Skies)"	"От сердца к небу"	05:10
5.	"Oy, Pechal-Toska (Oh, My Sorrow, My Anguish)"	"Ой, печаль-тоска"	05:42
6.	"Strela (Arrow)"	"Стрела"	05:24
7.	"Gutsulka (Hutsulka)"	"Гутсулка"	02:44
8.	"Tuman Yarom"	"Туман яром"	02:54
9.	"Slavsya Rus! (Hail Rus!)"	"Славься, Русь!"	04:27
10.	"Kupala i Kostroma (Kupala and Kostroma)"	"Купала и Кострома"	02:45
11.	"Vosstaniye Roda (Rod's Uprising)"	"Восстание Рода"	05:36
12.	"Gnev Vremen (The Wrath of Times)"	"Гнев времён"	05:17
13.	"Sva"	"Сва"	06:22
14.	"Katitsya Kolo (Kolo Is Rolling)"	"Катится Коло"	09:09
15.	"Rech' Veleslava (Speech of Veleslav)"	"Речь Велеслава"	01:53
Total length:			01:06:25

Disc two
No.	Title	Original Russian titles	Length
1.	"Kolymiyka"	"Коломийка"	04:22
2.	"Skvoz Tuman Vekov (Through the Mist of Ages)"	"Сквозь туман веков"	05:12
3.	"Po Syroi Zemle (On the Moist Earth)"	"По сырой земле"	08:26
4.	"Rus Iznachalnaya (Primordial Rus)"	"Русь изначальная"	05:48
5.	"Sotkany Veka (Woven Ages)"	"Сотканы века"	04:24
6.	"Chyornye Debri Voyny (Black Thickets of War)"	"Черные дебри войны"	04:40
7.	"Marena"	"Марена"	07:30
8.	"Zov Predkov (Call of the Ancestors)"	"Зов предков"	04:39
9.	"Kolyada (Carol)"	"Коляда"	06:34
10.	"Chiornye Vorony (Black Ravens)"	"Чёрные вороны"	03:42
11.	"Po Zverinym Tropam (On Animals' Paths)"	"По звериным тропам"	03:28
12.	"Maslenitsa (Carnival)"	"Масленица"	03:50
13.	"Vyidu Ya na Volyushku (I'll Come to the Free Lands)"	"Выйду я на волюшку"	03:57
14.	"Rus'"	"Русь"	06:50
15.	"Oy, To Ne Vecher (Oh, That Is Not Eve)"	"Ой, то не вечер"	04:34
Total length:			01:17:56

DVD
No.	Title	Original Russian titles	Length
1.	"Pokrovy Nebesnogo Startsa (Shrouds of Celestial Sage)"	"Покровы Небесного Старца"
2.	"Goy, Kupala!!! (Hey, Kupala)"	"Гой, Купала!!!"
3.	"Ot Serdtsa k Nebu (From the Heart to the Skies)"	"От сердца к небу"
4.	"Tuman Yarom"	"Туман яром"
5.	"Oy, Pechal-Toska (Oh, My Sorrow, My Anguish)"	"Ой, печаль-тоска"
6.	"Strela (Arrow)"	"Стрела"
7.	"Gutsulka (Hutsulka)"	"Гутсулка"
8.	"Slavsya Rus! (Hail Rus!)"	"Славься, Русь!"
9.	"Kupala i Kostroma (Kupala and Kostroma)"	"Купала и Кострома"
10.	"Sva"	"Сва"
11.	"Katitsya Kolo (Kolo Is Rolling)"	"Катится Коло"
12.	"Rech' Veleslava (Speech of Veleslav)"	"Речь Велеслава"
13.	"Kolymiyka"	"Коломийка"
14.	"Skvoz Tuman Vekov (Through the Mist of Ages)"	"Сквозь туман веков"
15.	"Po Syroi Zemle (On the Moist Earth)"	"По сырой земле"
16.	"Vosstaniye Roda (Rod's Uprising)"	"Восстание Рода"
17.	"Gnev Vremen (The Wrath of Times)"	"Гнев времён"
18.	"Rus Iznachalnaya (Primordial Rus)"	"Русь изначальная"
19.	"Sotkany Veka (Woven Ages)"	"Сотканы века"
20.	"Chyornye Debri Voyny (Black Thickets of War)"	"Черные дебри войны"
21.	"Marena"	"Марена"
22.	"Zov Predkov (Call of the Ancestors)"	"Зов предков"
23.	"Boi na mechakh (Sword fighting)"	"Бои на мечах"
24.	"Kolyada (Carol)"	"Коляда"
25.	"Chiornye Vorony (Black Ravens)"	"Чёрные вороны"
26.	"Po Zverinym Tropam (On Animals' Paths)"	"По звериным тропам"
27.	"Maslenitsa (Carnival)"	"Масленица"
28.	"Vyidu Ya na Volyushku (I'll Come to the Free Lands)"	"Выйду я на волюшку"
29.	"Rus'"	"Русь"
30.	"Oy, To Ne Vecher (Oh, That Is Not Eve)"	"Ой, то не вечер"
Total length:			02:22:48

=== DVD special features ===
- "Pokrovy Nebesnogo Startsa" and "Slavsya Rus!" videoclips
- Interview with Masha

== Personnel ==
- Maria Arkhipova – lead vocals
- Sergey Atrashkevich – guitars, backing vocals, programming, mixing, mastering
- Ruslan Oganyan – bass
- Vladimir Sokolov – drums

Additional musicians

- Vladimir Cherepovsky – wind ethnic instruments, vargan
- Dobromila – backing vocals
- Lyuboslava – backing vocals
- Valery Naumov – lead vocals ("Slavsya Rus!")
- Ilya Gura – guest vocals ("Po Syroi Zemle")
- Alexander Shvilyov – guest vocals ("Sotkany Veka"), lead vocals ("Chyornye Debri Voyny")
- Ksenia Markevich – lead vocals ("Maslenitsa")
- Veleslav from "Rodolyubie" community – speech
- Bronislava and Lisana – dance ("Oy, Pechal-Toska")

Production

- Roman Shcherbakov – engineering
- Evgeny Izmaylov – recording
- Olga Filonova – photography
- Yury Yeryomin – editing
- Kris Verwimp – art cover
