= Vazrazhdane (disambiguation) =

Vazrazhdane (Bulgarian: Възраждане) is a Bulgarian word meaning "revival", or "Renaissance".

- Bulgarian Revival, often known in Bulgarian as the Vazrazhdane
- Vazrazhdane, a region in Sofia
- Revival (Bulgaria)

== See also ==
- Vozrozhdeniye (disambiguation), a cognate term in the Russian language
