= Kob' =

2023 studio album by Arkona

Studio album by Arkona
- Released: 16 June 2023
- Genre: Black metal, pagan metal
- Length: 60:31
- Language: Russian
- Label: Napalm Records

Arkona chronology
Khram (2018)	Kob' (2023)

Kob' (Cyrillic script: Кобь, lit. 'Spell') is the ninth studio album by the Russian heavy metal band Arkona, released on 16 June 2023 through Napalm Records. The songs are about how mankind has tried, and failed, to rise above nature, and is descending in six steps toward self-annihilation. The subjects include spiritual decay, ecological disasters, diseases, the Russo-Ukrainian War, and nuclear warfare. Critics have described it as Arkona's darkest album.

== Music and lyrics ==
Arkona's singer and songwriter Masha "Scream" wrote Kob' from 2018 to 2022. She began with a concept and composed all music, before writing the lyrics and involving the other band members. Because Arkona's drummer Andrey Ishchenko left the band in 2020 due to creative differences, drums were recorded with the French session musician Kevin Paradise.

Kob' is themed around how mankind is descending and will be annihilated in six steps. Each track on the album, with the exception of the first and last, is devoted to one of the steps. Arkona attribute this descent to human attempts to "rise above the true divine essence of nature, resulting in all the elements rebel against the humans". Masha "Scream" says the album describes what she envisions will happen if current trends continue. The title Kob' means 'Spell'.

The first track on Kob', "Izrechenie. Nachalo", introduces the album's concept and describes mankind as having been taken over by darkness. The second track is the title track, which is about the first step of mankind's descent, and says we have unburied an ancient evil and placed our own saviour in its grave. The second step is covered in "Ydi", which is written as a funeral song for a mankind that has died spiritually. The track features a guitar solo from the guest performer A. Thanatos. "Ugasaya" is about ecological disasters and how Mother Nature tries to kill mankind for hurting her. The fourth step, "Mor", is about diseases and epidemics, and how mankind creates the worst plague for itself. "Na zakate bagrovogo solntsa" was inspired by the ongoing Russo-Ukrainian War. Masha "Scream", who has relatives in Ukraine, says it is her personal description of "all the feelings I have for this unbearable, sick war that has robbed me of everything". "Razryvaya plot' ot bezyskhodnosti bytiya" mentions the previous steps before going into the sixth and final step, which is nuclear warfare and the self-annihilation of mankind, although the song ends with an urge to survivors to come to their senses. The final track, "Izrechenie. Iskhod", summarises the entire album.

== Release ==
Napalm Records released Kob' on 16 June 2023. It was Arkona's ninth studio album and the first since Khram was released in 2018. The cover art was created by the duo Rotten Fantom, which also made the artwork for Khram. It shows a woman at different ages, to signify mankind at its different stages from birth to death, and features an ouroboros, which is a snake that bites its own tail. The tracks "Kob'", "Mor" and "Ugasaya" were released with music videos.

== Reception ==
In the German edition of Metal Hammer, Bianca Härtzsch called Kob' Arkona's darkest record to date and said the band seem to have observed recent world events closely and set the "suicidal side of modern society to music". Härtzsch said Masha "Scream"'s vocals are a consistent highlight on an album that contains some lighter passages with acoustic guitars and wind instruments, "occult, dynamic black metal", and well-produced pagan metal, but also parts where little happens musically. Markus Endres of Metal.de wrote that the album continues Arkona's movement away from the folk metal and fun themes on Yav (2014) and toward increasingly gloomy music, making it a logical successor to Khram. He stressed the variety, complexity and atmosphere of the music, describing the album as "emotionally demanding and thereby also sometimes exhausting".

== Track listing ==
Track listing adapted from Bandcamp.

No.	Title	Length
1.	"Izrechenie. Nachalo"	04:19
2.	"Kob'"	07:14
3.	"Ydi"	11:48
4.	"Ugasaya"	09:07
5.	"Mor"	09:41
6.	"Na zakate bagrovogo solntsa"	09:03
7.	"Razryvaya plot' ot bezyskhodnosti bytiya"	07:13
8.	"Izrechenie. Iskhod"	02:06
Total length:		60:31

== Personnel ==
Arkona

- Masha "Scream" – vocals, keyboards, percussion, songwriting, lyrics, producer, mixing
- Sergei "Lazar" Atrashkevich – guitars, producer, mixing, mastering
- Ruslan "Kniaz" Oganyan – bass
- Vladimir "Volk" Reshetnikov – wind instruments on "Mor", "Razryvaya plot' ot bezyskhodnosti bytiya"

Additional musicians

- Kévin Paradise – drums
- A. Thanatos – guitar and effects on "Ydi"

Production

- Rotten Fantom – artwork, design
- Edaliana Rennenkampf – photography
