= Yav (album) =

Yav Явь

Studio album by Arkona
- Released: 25 April 2014
- Recorded: June–October 2013 at CDM Records studio, Moscow
- Genre: Pagan metal, folk metal
- Length: 67:52
- Language: Russian, Ukrainian, Swedish
- Label: Napalm Records
- Producer: Sergei "Lazar" and Masha "Scream"

Arkona chronology
Slovo (2011)	Yav; Явь (2014)	Khram (2018)

Yav (Russian: Явь) is the seventh full-length album by the Russian pagan metal band Arkona. It was released on 25 April 2014 through Napalm Records.

The album references the material world Yav. Violin players Olli Vänskä of Turisas and Alexey of Sviatogor appear as guest musicians.

== Track listing ==
No.	Title	Writer(s)	Translation	Length
1.	"Zarozhdenie" (Зарождение)	Maria Arkhipova	Origination	8:59
2.	"Na strazhe novyh let" (На страже новых лет)	Arkhipova	On Guard of New Aeons	7:23
3.	"Serbia" (Сербия)	Arkhipova	Serbia	5:32
4.	"Zov pustyh dereven'" (Зов пустых деревень)	Arkhipova, Sergei Atrashkevich	Empty Villages' Call	6:20
5.	"Gorod snov" (Город снов)	Arkhipova	City of Dream	4:48
6.	"Ved'ma" (Ведьма)	Arkhipova, Thomas Väänänen	The Witch	6:19
7.	"Chado indigo" (Чадо индиго)	Arkhipova	Indigo Child	7:39
8.	"Yav'" (Явь)	Arkhipova	Yav	13:26
9.	"V ob'yat'yah kramoly" (В обьятьях крамолы)	Arkhipova	Embraced by Sedition	6:42
Total length:				67:52

== Personnel ==
=== Arkona ===
- Masha "Scream" – vocals, keyboards, songwriting, lyrics, lyrics translation, producer
- Sergei "Lazar" Atrashkevich – guitars, producer, mixing, mastering
- Ruslan "Kniaz" Oganyan – bass
- Vlad "Artist" Sokolov – drums (except on "Chado indigo", "Yav'", "V ob'yat'yah kramoly")
- Vladimir "Volk" Reshetnikov – gaita gallega, tin whistle, low whistle, sopilka, blockflute

Additional musicians

- Thomas Väänänen – vocals, lyrics on "Ved'ma"
- Olli Vänskä (Turisas) – violin on "Zov pustyh dereven"
- Aleksey "Master Alafern" Hrebeniuk - violin on "Zarozhdenie", "Na strazhe novyh let", "Gorod snov", "Ved'ma", "Chado indigo", "Yav'"
- Vika "Vkgoeswild" Yermlyeva – piano on "Chado indigo"
- Radimir Atrashkevich – child narration on "Chado indigo"
- Andrey Ischenko – drums on "Chado indigo", "Yav'", "V ob'yat'yah kramoly"

Production

- Sergey Pavlov – lyrics translation
- Gyula Havancsák – artwork, design
- Greg Shanta – photography

== Reception ==
Professional ratings
Review scores
Source	Rating
Stormbringer	4/5 stars

The Sonic Seducer magazine wrote that Yav was more mature and serious than Arkona's previous releases, leaving the clichés of the genre behind. The album was also lauded for a diversity of moods. The reviewer for the Austrian Stormbringer website observed that elements of black metal had now been combined with Arkona's typical style which provided for the album's sinister atmosphere.
