= Oy, to ne vecher =

Russian folk song

"Oy, to ne vecher" (Ой, то не вечер) is the incipit of a Russian folk song, also known as "The Cossack's Parable" (Казачья Притча) or as "Stepan Razin's Dream" (Сон Степана Разина).

It was first published by composer Alexandra Zheleznova-Armfelt (1866–1933) in her collection Songs of the Ural Cossacks after her fieldwork in the Ural District during 1896–1897. The original title was (in pre-1917 orthography) Ой, не вечоръ, то-ли не вечоръ. (Сон Стеньки Разина.) The lyrics were reportedly recorded by "75-year-old Cossack F. S. Zh.".

The original lyrics were in seven verses, with verse six making explicit that the dreamer is 17th-century rebel Stepan Razin. Razin has a dream, and his captain (esaul) interprets it as an omen of their defeat.

1. Ah, it is not yet evening, but I have taken a tiny little nap, and a dream came to me;
2. In the dream that came to me, it was as if my raven-black horse was playing about, dancing about, beneath the bold, brave youth.
3. Ah, and there wild winds came flying out of the east, and they ripped the black cap from that wild head of mine.
4. Ah, the sounding bow was ripped off the mighty shoulder, ah, the tempered arrows were scattered on damp mother earth,
5. Ah, who will be there for me, that he would interpret this dream? Ah, the esaul was a clever one, the esaul unravelled all of that dream:
6. "Stepan, our dear, Timofeyevich, you whom they call Razin, off your head fell the black cap: off will come that wild head of yours.
7. "Ripped away, alas, was the sounding bow: for me, the esaul, there will be a hanging. Ah, scattered were the tempered arrows: our Cossacks, alas, they will all turn to flight."

The song has been performed in several variants, sometimes expanded to up to eleven verses, but in the most common variant as sung by modern interpreters, it is reduced to four verses, removing the mention of Razin and reducing the three omens in the dream to a single one. These lyrics may be translated as:

1. Ah, it is not yet evening, but I have taken a tiny little nap, and a dream came to me;
2. In the dream that came to me, it was as if my raven-black horse was playing about, dancing about, was being frisky beneath me;
3. Ah, and there evil winds came flying out of the east, and they ripped the black cap from that wild head of mine.
4. And the esaul was a clever one, he was able to interpret my dream. "Ah, it will surely come off", he said, "that wild head of yours".

The song became very popular during the 20th century and has been performed by numerous interpreters since the 1970s, including Ariel in the rock-opera "The Legend of Yemelyan Pugachev" (1978), Zhanna Bichevskaya (1996), Arkona (2004), Zolotoye Koltso (2007), Pelageya (2009) and Valery Kipelov (2011). A 2006 interpretation by Andrey Zheleznyakov became known internationally as the entrance theme used by mixed martial arts fighter Fedor Emilianenko.
