= Vidrodzhennia =

Vidrodzhennia (Ukrainian: Відродження) is a word in the Ukrainian language, literally meaning "revival" or "renaissance". It may also refer to:

- Vidrodzhennia, Bakhmut Raion, Donetsk Oblast, a village in Ukraine
- Revival (Ukraine) (Vidrodzhennia), a political party

== See also ==
- Vozrozhdeniye (disambiguation), the equivalent Russian-language term
