= Ot serdtsa k nebu =

Ot Serdtsa k Nebu (От сердца к небу)

Studio album by Arkona
- Released: 31 October 2007
- Recorded: May – September 2007 at CDM Records and Gigant Records studios
- Genre: Folk metal
- Length: 60:51
- Label: Sound Age Production; Napalm Records

Arkona chronology
Zhizn vo Slavu (Жизнь во славу) (2006)	Ot Serdtsa k Nebu (От сердца к небу) (2007)	Noch Velesova (Ночь Велесова) (2008)

Ot Serdtsa k Nebu (От Сердца к Небу) is the fourth full-length album by the Russian folk metal band Arkona. It was released on 31 October 2007 through Sound Age Production and later through Napalm Records. The name translates to "From the Heart to the Sky".

== Reception ==
Professional ratings
Review scores
Source	Rating
About.com	4/5 stars
Exclaim!	favourable
Metal Hammer (Germany)	5/7

The album received a positive review from the Canadian Exclaim! magazine. The author noted the album's variations in tone and structure and wrote that Arkona had "achieved the harder task" of integrating hard modern sounds and traditional tunes. The German edition of Metal Hammer awarded 5 out of 7 points to the album. About.com wrote that singer Maria "Masha" Arkhipova was an "excellent vocalist" who was capable of performing both soft song and harsh screaming and growling with a high standard.

== Track listing ==
No.	Title	Translation	Length
1.	"Pokrovy Nebesnogo Startsa" (Покровы Небесного Старца)	Shrouds of Celestial Sage	7:34
2.	"Goy, Kupala!!!" (Гой, Купала!!!)	Hey, Kupala	3:42
3.	"Ot Serdtsa k Nebu" (От Сердца к Небу)	From the Heart to the Skies	5:06
4.	"Oy, Pechal-Toska" (Ой, Печаль-Тоска)	Oh, My Sorrow, My Anguish	5:33
5.	"Gutsulka" (Гутсулка)	Hutsulka	2:44
6.	"Strela" (Стрела)	Arrow	6:16
7.	"Nad Propastyu Let" (Над пропастью лет)	Over the Abyss of Ages	6:40
8.	"Slavsya Rus!" (Славься, Русь!)	Hail Rus!	4:00
9.	"Kupala i Kostroma" (Купала и Кострома)	Kupala and Kostroma	2:30
10.	"Tsigular" (Цигулар)	Violinist	3:43
11.	"Sva" (Сва)		6:31
12.	"Katitsya Kolo" (Катится Коло)	Kolo Is Rolling	10:16

== Personnel ==
=== Arkona ===
- Masha "Scream" – vocals, keyboards, tambourine, komuz, acoustic guitar ("Sva"), lyrics, producer, mixing, engineering, mastering
- Sergei "Lazar" Atrashkevich – guitars, choir, spoken word ("Nad Propastyu Let"), songwriting ("Goy, Kupala!!!", "Slavsya Rus"), producer, mixing, engineering
- Ruslan "Kniaz" Oganyan – bass
- Vlad "Artist" Sokolov – drums

Additional musicians

- Vladimir Cherepovsky – bagpipes, Hurdy gurdy, whistles, sopilka, ocarina, zafun
- Andrey Bayramov – percussion
- Alexander Oleynikov – accordion
- Vasily Derevyanny – domra ("Ot Serdtsa k Nebu", "Slavysa Rus")
- Alexander Shvilyov, Alexandra Grakhovskaya, Maria Sazonova, Valery Naumov – choir

Production

- Kris Verwimp – cover art
