= KOB (disambiguation) =

KOB is a TV station, Albuquerque, New Mexico, US.

KOB or Kob may also refer to:

- Kob, an antelope found in Africa
- Kob', a 2023 album by the Russian heavy metal band Arkona
- Argyrosomus inodorus the silver kob, a species of fish
- Kids Off the Block, a youth project in Chicago, United States
- KKOB (AM), previously KOB, a radio station in Albuquerque, New Mexico, US
- KOBQ, previously KOB-FM, a radio station in Albuquerque, New Mexico, US
- Kowloon Bay station, Hong Kong, MTR station code
- Kop of Boulogne (KoB), kop stand of the Parc des Princes, the home of Paris Saint-Germain F.C.
- Kevin O'Brien (cricketer), Irish cricketer
- Kingdom of Bhutan
- Kingdom of Bahrain
