= Naďa Profantová =

Naďa Profantová (born 4 January 1962) is a Czech historian, archaeologist and expert publicist.

== Education and career ==
Profantová was born on 4 January 1962 in Prague, Czechoslovakia. She studied prehistory at the Faculty of Arts, Charles University in Prague. She has worked at the Archaeological Institute of the Czechoslovak Academy of Sciences and shortly at the Central Bohemian Museum in Roztoky. In 2025 she is employed at the Archaeological Institute of the Czech Academy of Sciences. In addition to her research work, she also engages in teaching at the Faculty of Arts at Charles University and the University of Hradec Králové.

== Research ==
Profantová specializes in the early Middle Ages, the early Slavic period, the coexistence of Slavs with Avars, social elites, and the earliest fortified settlements (hradiště). She is the author of eight books as well as numerous studies, scientific papers, and publications on historical topics.

Profantová has published numerous monographs, including works on the Samo's Empire and Slavic mythology. She also contributed the first volume to a collective monograph on Czech history, which covers the period up to 1197. Her other books include a work on Ludmila of Bohemia and three separate volumes detailing her archaeological excavations in Mikulčice, Klecany, and Roztoky.

== Publications ==
The information below is from Czech bibliographical databases.

=== Monographs and reviews ===
1. Lutovsky, Michal; Profantova, Nada (1995). Sámova říše [Samo's Empire] (in Czech). Prague: Academia. ISBN 978-80-200-0420-8.
  - Hilsch, Peter [in German] (1997). "Hilsch, Peter - Sámova říše. Lutovský, Michal - Profantová, Naďa. Recenze". Bohemia. Zeitschrift für Geschichte und Kultur der Böhmischen Länder. 38 (1): 209–210. ISSN 0523-8587.
  - Klapste, Jan [in Czech] (1996). "Sámova říše / Michal Lutovský, Naďa Profantová Recenze". Archeologické rozhledy. 48 (2): 349–350. ISSN 0323-1267.
  - Hlaváček, Ivan [in Czech]. "Sámova říše. Lutovský, Michal - Profantová, Naďa. Zpráva". Deutsches Archiv für Erforschung des Mittelalters. 52 (2): 717. ISSN 0012-1223.
2. Profantova, Nada (1996). Kněžna Ludmila. Vládkyně a světice, zakladatelka rodu [Princess Ludmila: Ruler and Saint, Founder of a Dynasty] (in Czech). Prague: Epocha. ISBN 978-80-902-1294-7.
  - Kuchyňka, Zdeněk [in Czech] (1997). "Kněžna Ludmila. Vládkyně a světice, zakladatelka rodu. Recenze". Posel z Budče. Almanach poutníků na staroslavnou Budeč (12–13): 46. OCLC 320412406.
3. Blahova, Marie; Frolik, Jan; Profantova, Nada (1999). Velké dějiny zemí Koruny české sv. 1 - do roku 1197 [Great History of the Lands of the Bohemian Crown, Vol. 1 - up to the year 1197] (in Czech). Prague: Paseka. ISBN 978-80-7185-264-3.
  - Klapste, Jan (2000). "Velké dějiny zemí Koruny české. Sv. 1. Do roku 1197. Marie Bláhová, Jan Frolík, Naďa Profantová Recenze". Dějiny a současnost. Kulturně historická revue. 22 (3): 60. OCLC 242980686.
  - Wihoda, Martin [in Czech] (2000). "Velké dějiny zemí Koruny české. Sv. 1. Do roku 1197. Marie Bláhová, Jan Frolík, Naďa Profantová Recenze". Časopis Matice moravské. 119 (1): 267–271. ISSN 0323-052X.
  - Chvojka, Ondřej (2001). "Velké dějiny zemí Koruny české. Sv. 1. Do roku 1197. Marie Bláhová, Jan Frolík, Naďa Profantová Recenze". Archeologické výzkumy v jižních Čechách. 14: 317–318. ISSN 0231-8237.
4. Profantova, Nada; Profant, Martin (2000). Encyklopedie slovanských bohů a mýtů [Encyclopedia of Slavic Gods and Myths] (in Czech). Prague: Libri. ISBN 978-80-7277-011-3.
  - Wolf, Ondrej (2001). "Encyklopedie slovanských bohů a mýtů. Profantová, Naďa - Profant, Martin. Recenze". Archeologické rozhledy. 53 (1): 175–176. ISSN 0323-1267.
  - Kovarik, Petr (2000). "Bohové a mýty starých Slovanů". České slovo. 92 (166): 12. ISSN 1211-6416.
5. Profantova, Nada; Kovanova, Blanka; Kouril, Pavel (2003). Mikulčice - pohřebiště u 6. a 12. kostela [Mikulčice: The Cemetery at the 6th and 12th Churches] (in Czech). Brno: Archeologický ústav Akademie věd České republiky. ISBN 978-80-8602-355-7.
6. Kuna, Marin; Profantova, Nada (2005). Počátky raného středověku v Čechách. Archeologický výzkum sídelní aglomerace kultury pražského typu v Roztokách [The onset of the Early Middle Ages in Bohemia. Archaeological Research at a large settlement sit of the Prague-type culture at Roztoky] (in Czech). Prague: Archeologický ústav AV ČR. ISBN 978-80-8612-451-3.
  - Pleinerova, Ivana [in Czech] (2006). "Počátky raného středověku v Čechách. Archeologický výzkum sídelní aglomerace kultury pražského typu v Roztokách. = The onset of the Early Middle Ages in bohemia. Archaeological Research at a large settlement sit of the Prague-type culture at Roztoky. Kuna, Martin - Profantová, Naďa a kol. Recenze". Archeologické rozhledy. 58 (4): 839–841. ISSN 0323-1267.
7. Profantova, Nada (2010). Klecany raně středověká pohřebiště - II [Klecany: Early Medieval Cemeteries - II] (in Czech). Prague: Epocha. ISBN 978-80-7425-052-1.
8. Profantova, Nada (2023). "Trade and Relationships at the Turn of the Epochs: From Hildigis to Samo". In Jiřík, Jaroslav; Blažková, Kateřina; Bezáková, Jana (eds.). Royal Insignia of Late Antiquity from Mšec and Řevničov: Magnificent Finds from the Migration Period from Central Bohemia. Rakovník: Museum T. G. M. in Rakovník. pp. 209–221, 242. ISBN 978-80-85081-46-6.
9. Profantova, Nada (2025). "Exploring Paganism and the Beginnings of Christianity in Bohemia (an Archaeologist's View)". In Bracha, Krzysztof; Nodl, Martin (eds.). Christians, Pagans, Dissidents: Christianisation in Late Medieval Bohemia and Poland. Dresden: Sandstein. pp. 11–39. doi:10.25621/sv-gwzo/FGKoeM-66. ISBN 978-3-95498-913-3.

=== Selected publications ===
- Profantova, Nada (2001). "K průniku prvků franského životního stylu do Čech 9. století (na základě poznatků archeologie [On the Penetration of Frankish Lifestyle Elements into 9th-Century Bohemia (Based on Archaeological Findings)]". Velká Morava mezi východem a západem = Großmähren zwischen West und Ost : sborník příspěvků z mezinárodní vědecké konference [Great Moravia Between East and West: Proceedings of an International Scientific Conference] (in Czech). Archeologický ústav Akademie věd České republiky. pp. 327–338. ISBN 978-80-8602-328-1.
- Profantova, Nada; Stolz, Daniel (2006). "Kovové nálezy z hradiště v Tismicích a pokus o interpretaci významu hradiště v raném středověku" [Metal Finds from the Hillfort in Tismice and an Attempt to Interpret the Significance of the Hillfort in the Early Middle Ages]. Archeologie ve středních Čechách (in Czech). 10 (2): 793–838. ISSN 1214-3553.
- Profantova, Nada (2009). "Kultura s keramikou pražského typu a problém šíření slavinity do střední Evropy: K článku Florina Curty" [The Prague-type pottery culture and the problem of diffusion of Slavinity into central Europe. On the article by Florin Curta]. Archeologické Rozhledy (in Czech). 61 (2): 303–330. ISSN 0323-1267.
- Profantova, Nada (2010). "Awarische Funde in der Tschechischen Republik — forschungsstand und neue Erkenntnisse" [Avar Finds in the Czech Republic: State of Research and New Insights]. Acta Archaeologica Carpathica (in German). 45: 203–270. ISSN 2719-4841.
- Profantova, Nada (2013). "Náhrdelníky byzantského (?) původu a bronzové kruhové ozdoby ve slovanském prostředí 6.–7. století. K interkulturním vztahům" [Necklaces of Byzantine (?) Origin and Bronze Circular Ornaments in the Slavic Environment of the 6th–7th Centuries: On Intercultural Relations] (PDF). Památky archeologické (in Czech). 104: 149–182. ISSN 0031-0506.
- Profantova, Nada (2015). Klecany. Raně středověká pohřebiště I [Klecany: Early Medieval Cemeteries I] (in Czech). Prague: Epocha. ISBN 978-80-7557-115-1.
- Profantova, Nada (2016). "Ostruhy jako doklady přítomnosti elity v 8. a 9. století v Čechách" [Spurs as Evidence of the Presence of Elites in 8th and 9th Century Bohemia] (PDF). Archaeologia Historica (in Czech). 41 (2): 7–40. doi:10.5817/AH2016-2-1. ISSN 0231-5823.
- Profantova, Nada; Krivanek, Roman; Fikrle, Marek; Zavrel, Jan (2020). "Tismice jako produkční a nadregionální centrum Čech 8. a 9. století" [Tismice as a Production and Supralocal Center of Bohemia in the 8th and 9th Centuries] (PDF). Památky archeologické (in Czech). 111: 193–271. doi:10.35686/PA2020.5. ISSN 0031-0506.
