= Vozrozhdeniye (album) =

Vozrozhdeniye (Возрождение)
- Original release cover

Studio album by Arkona
- Released: 20 April 2004
- Recorded: October 2003 – February 2004
- Studio: CDM Records Studio (Moscow, Russia)
- Genre: Folk metal
- Length: 58:33
- Label: Sound Age Production
- Producer: Masha "Scream"; Sergei "Lazar"

Arkona chronology
Rus (Русь) (2001)	Vozrozhdeniye (Возрождение) (2004)	Lepta (Лепта) (2004)

Vozrozhdeniye (Возрождение)
- 2005 re-release cover

Vozrozhdeniye (Russian: Возрождение, lit. 'Revival') is the first full-length album by the Russian folk metal band Arkona. It was released on 20 April 2004 through Sound Age Production. A re-recording of the album with different artwork was released by Napalm Records in 2016.

== Track listing ==
1. "Kolyada" (Carol) – 6:56
2. "Maslenitsa" (Carnival) – 2:51
3. "K Domu Svaroga" (To the House of Svarog) – 5:21
4. "Chiornye Vorony" (Black Ravens) – 4:15
5. "Vozrozhdeniye" (Revival) – 6:05
6. "Rus'" – 6:34
7. "Bratye Slavyane" (Brother Slavs) – 4:53
8. "Solntsevorot" (Solstice) – 3:37
9. "Pod Mechami" (Under the Swords) – 5:12
10. "Po Zverinym Tropam" (On Animals' Paths) – 3:37
11. "Zalozhnyy" (Dead One) – 4:10
12. "Zov Predkov" (Call of the Ancestors) – 5:02

=== Original track listing (in Russian) ===
1. "Коляда"
2. "Масленица"
3. "К дому Сварога"
4. "Чёрные вороны"
5. "Возрождение"
6. "Русь"
7. "Брате славяне"
8. "Солнцеворот"
9. "Под мечами..."
10. "По звериным тропам..."
11. "Заложный"
12. "Зов предков"

== Credits ==
=== Arkona ===
- Masha "Scream" – vocals, keyboards, lyrics, songwriting, arrangements, mastering, mixing, producer

Additional musicians

- Alexei "Lesyar" Agafonov – vocals ("K Domu Svaroga", "Chernye Vorony", "Pod Mechami")
- Ruslan "Kniaz" Oganyan – bass
- Sergei "Lazar" Atrashkevich – guitars, mastering, mixing, producer
- Vlad "Artist" Sokolov – drums, percussion

=== 2016 re-recording ===
- Masha "Scream" – vocals, keyboards, lyrics, songwriting, producer
- Ruslan "Kniaz" Oganyan – bass
- Sergei "Lazar" Atrashkevich – guitars, recording, mastering, mixing, producer
- Vladimir "Volk" Reshetnikov – gaita gallega, blockflute, whistles, sopilka
- Andrey Ischenko – drums

Production

- W. Smerdulak – design
- Kris Verwirp – artwork
- Anton Kozov – photography
