= Vozrozhdeniye, Vologda Oblast =

Vozrozhdeniye Возрождение
- Settlement
- Location within Vologda Oblast Location within Russia
- Coordinates: 59°46′N 40°11′E
- Country: Russia
- Region: Vologda Oblast
- District: Kharovsky District
- Time zone: UTC+3:00

Vozrozhdeniye (Russian: Возрождение) is a rural locality (a settlement) in Semigorodneye Rural Settlement, Kharovsky District, Vologda Oblast, Russia. The population was 37 as of 2002.

== Geography ==
Vozrozhdeniye is located 36 km south of Kharovsk (the district's administrative centre) by road. Semigorodnyaya is the nearest rural locality.
