= Vozrozhdeniye, Voronezh Oblast =

Vozrozhdeniye Возрождение
- Settlement
- Location within Voronezh Oblast Location within Russia
- Coordinates: 51°47′N 40°40′E
- Country: Russia
- Region: Voronezh Oblast
- District: Ertilsky District
- Time zone: UTC+3:00

Vozrozhdeniye (Russian: Возрождение) is a rural locality (a settlement) in Pervomayskoye Rural Settlement, Ertilsky District, Voronezh Oblast, Russia. The population was 79 in 2010. There are three streets.

== Geography ==
Vozrozhdeniye is located 13 kilometres (8.1 mi) southwest of Ertil (the district's administrative centre) by road. Pervomaysky is the nearest rural locality.
