= Arkona (band) =

Russian folk metal band

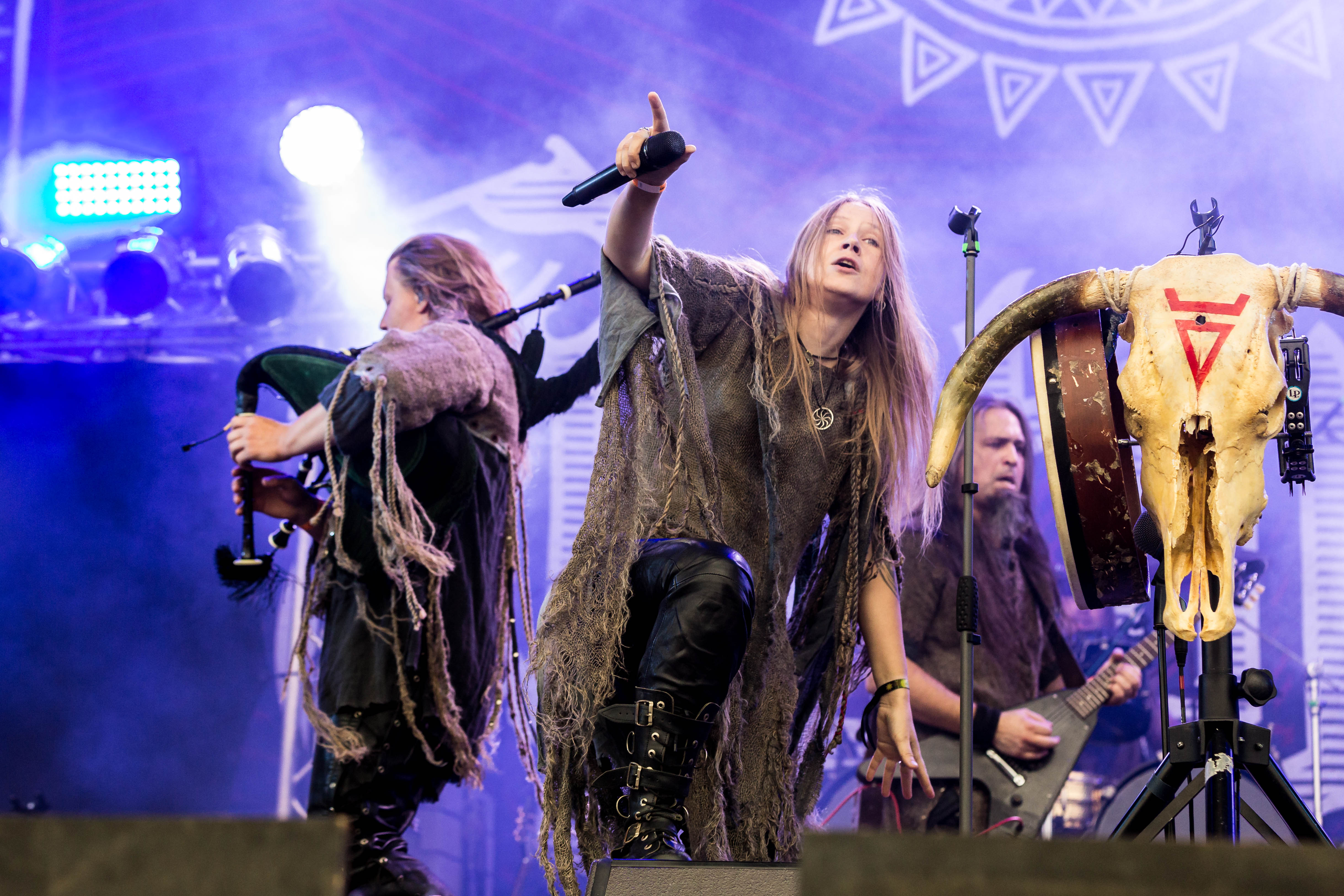
- Arkona at Party.San Metal Open Air 2019

Background information
- Origin: Moscow, Russia
- Genres: Pagan metal, folk metal, black metal
- Years active: 2002–present
- Labels: Sound Age, Napalm
- Members: Masha "Scream"; Sergei "Lazar"; Ruslan "Kniaz"; Vladimir "Volk"; Alexander Smirnov
- Past members: Vlad "Artist" Sokolov; Andrey Ishchenko
- Website: arkona-russia.com

Arkona (Russian: Аркона) is a Russian folk metal band. Their lyrics are heavily influenced by Russian folklore and Slavic mythology, and their music incorporates several traditional Russian musical instruments. The name of the band "Arkona" refers to the last Pre-Christianized Slavic city-castle.

== History ==
The band was founded in February 2002 by two members of Dolgoprudny Slavic Neopaganism Society: Masha "Scream" Arkhipova and Alexander "Warlock" Korolyov, originally as Giperboreya (Гиперборея – Hyperborea). At the end of 2002 the group (featuring also Evgeny Knyazev on guitar, Evgeny Borzov on bass and Olga Loginova on keyboards, and now as Arkona) entered the Moscow CDM Studios. Having recorded the Rus demo (its three tracks re-surfaced in 2006 as bonuses for the live set Zhizn vo Slavu), the band started playing live, performing with fellow Russian folk metal bands, like Butterfly Temple, Pagan Reign, Svarga, and Rossomahaar.

In September 2003 Arkona disbanded, due to the general lack of enthusiasm on the part of some of Maria's colleagues. Arkhipova opted to continue and wrote the material for a solo album, which she presented to the members of Nargathrond, another project she was singing for at the time. The resulting debut album Vozrozhdeniye came out in March 2004 on Soundage Production. By this time the band featured three new members: guitarist Sergey "Lazar", bassist Ruslan "Knyaz" and drummer Vlad "Artist". Recorded in the autumn, their second album, Lepta, was released in December.

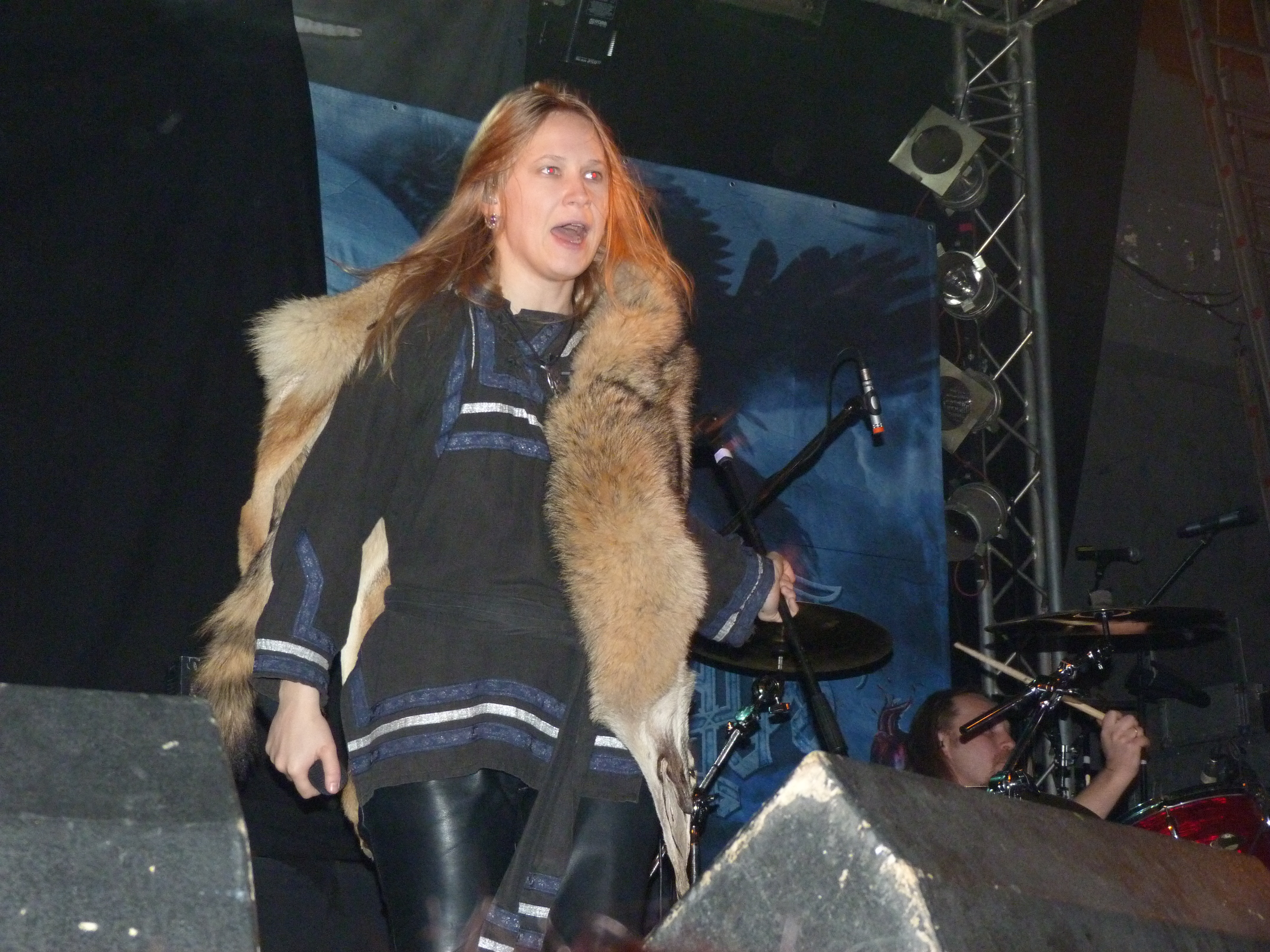
Maria 'Masha Scream' Arkhipova

2005 saw the release of the band's third and highly diverse album Vo slavu velikim!, featuring an acclaimed Russian folk multi-instrumentalist Vladimir Cherepovsky (Mevent, Voinstvo Sadov, Veter Vody) as well various members of Svarga and Alkonost groups. In September 2005 the album went gold in Russia. The group's October performance at the CD's presentation ceremony was recorded, to be released in March 2006 as live DVD/CD Zhizn Vo Slavu. Arkona's fourth studio album Ot serdtsa k nebu, recorded again with Cherepovsky (various members of the Belarusian folk choir Gostitsa also took part) was released by Soundage Productions in 2007. The artwork for the sleeve was provided by the Belgian artist Kris Verwimp who's continued working for the band ever since.

In March 2008 Arkona performed at the Ragnarök Festival and were signed to the Austrian label Napalm Records which re-issued Ot Serdtsa K Nebu, and organized the band's 30-date European tour, which ended with their appearance at the Brutal Assault festival.

Arkona's fifth studio album, Goi, Rode, Goi!, released in October 2009, proved to be an ambitious affair: all in all, more than 40 musicians took part, including a choir and a string quintet. All ethnic instruments were played in the studio by Vladimir Cherepovsky and his student Vladimir "Volk", who subsequently joined the band as a full-time member. Prior to that, the band's second DVD Noch Velesova came out in May.

2010 was a year of intensive touring: the band played more than 150 concerts all over Europe. In August 2011 Arkona's sixth studio album Slovo was released; again a stylistically eclectic mix, it featured the Chamber Orchestra of the Kazan Conservatory and the Moscow Conservatory's student choir. That year saw the band appearing at numerous heavy metal events, including Hellfest, With Full Force and Metalfest.

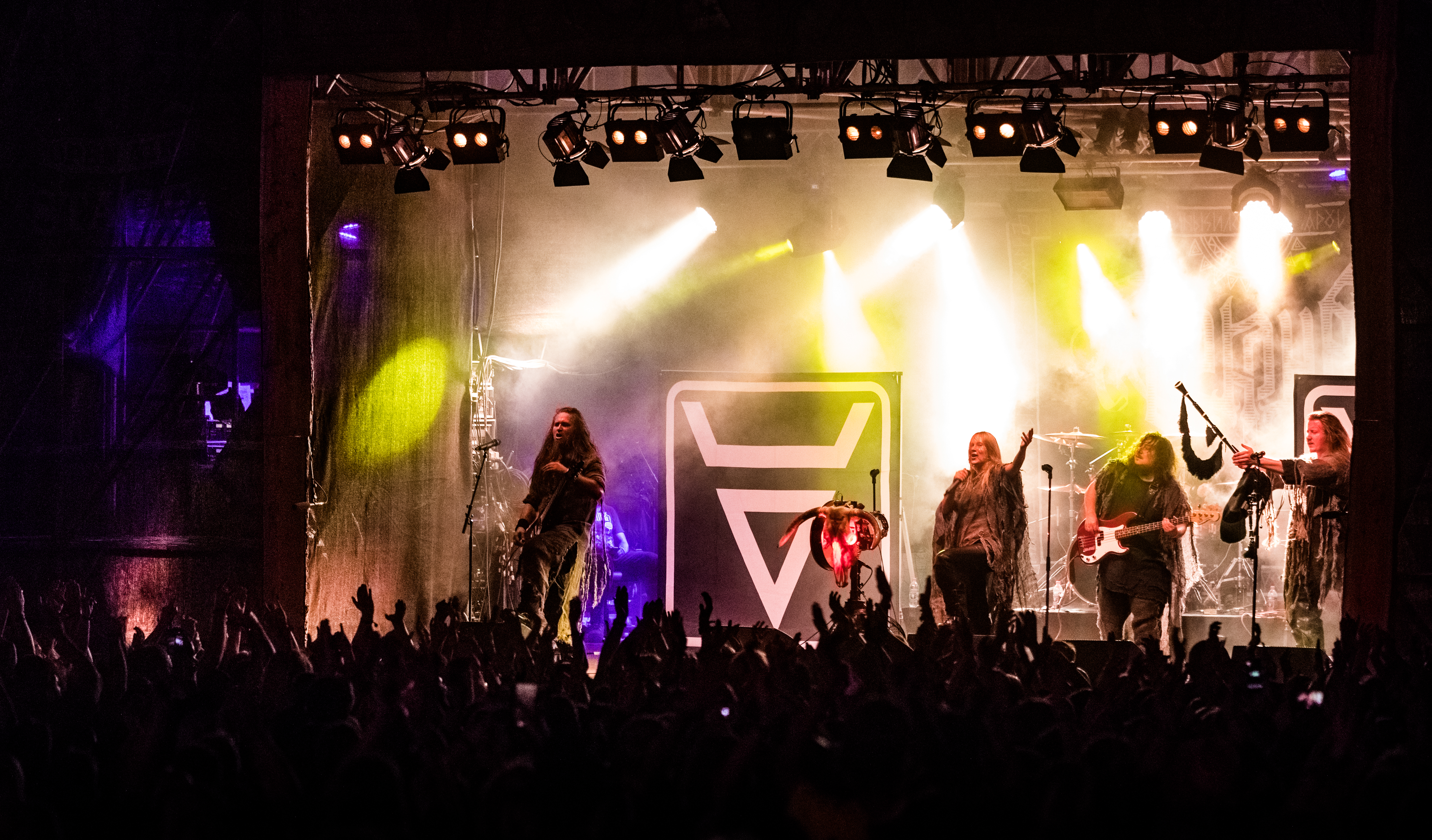
Arkona at Wacken Open Air 2018

In 2011 the band conducted a 36-date tour over Canada, United States and Mexico. The special 10th Anniversary concert was recorded in Moscow on 11 February 2012 (to be released next year as Decade of Glory), followed by massive Russian and European tours, including concerts with Dalriada and Darkest Era, as well as the appearance at the 70,000 Tons of Metal event. In October 2013 the band interrupted their studio recording for another America tour, now as headliners.

In January 2014, Arkona announced on its Facebook page that drummer Vlad "Artist" Sokolov had left the band, citing personal reasons, marking its first lineup change in 10 years. Andrey Ishchenko joined the band as the new drummer. Yav, the concept album, came out in April 2014.

In November 2016, Arkona released a re-recorded version of their debut album Vozrozhdeniye. In January 2018 Arkona released the studio album Khram. In May 2020, Arkona announced on Facebook that drummer Andrey Ishchenko had left the band.

Arkona's albums have been widely acclaimed and the band has repeatedly been called one of the best pagan metal acts.

== In popular culture ==
On 11 March 2010, a clip of the song "Yarilo" from Goi, Rode, Goi! was featured on the St. Patrick's Day episode of the U.S. version of the television series The Office. Three (apparently Russian) janitors walked in with the song playing while the workers were still in the office, forced to work late.

== Band members ==
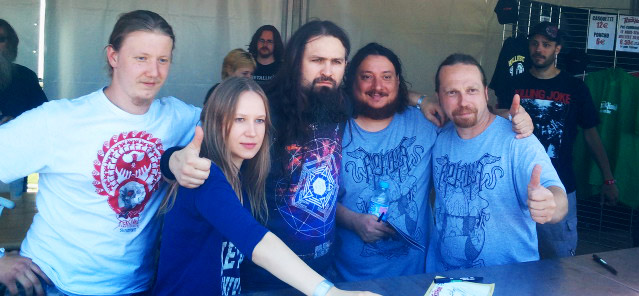
The band at Hellfest 2015

Current

- Maria "Masha Scream" Arkhipova – vocals, keyboards (2002-present)
- Sergei "Lazar" Atrashkevich – guitars (2003-present)
- Ruslan "Kniaz" Rosomaherov – bass (2003-present)
- Vladimir "Volk" Reshetnikov – wind ethnic instruments (2011-present)
- Alexander "Noff" Smirnov – drums (2021-present)

Former

- Andrey Ishchenko – drums (2014–2020)
- Vlad "Artist" Lyovushkin Sokolov – drums, keyboards (2003–2014)
- Ilja Bogatyrev – guitar (2002–2003)
- Evgenij Knjazev – guitar (2002–2003)
- Evgenij Borzov – bass (2002–2003)
- Alexandr Warlock – drums (2002–2003)
- Olga Loginova – keyboards (2002–2003)

== Discography ==
Studio albums

- Vozrozhdeniye (2004)
- Lepta (2004)
- Vo slavu velikim! (2005)
- Ot serdtsa k nebu (2007)
- Goi, Rode, Goi! (2009)
- Slovo (2011)
- Yav (2014)
- Khram (2018)
- Kob' (2023)

EP

- Stenka na Stenku (2011)

Live albums and DVDs

- Zhizn vo Slavu (2006)
- Noch Velesova (2009)
- Decade of Glory (2013)

Demo

- Rus (2002)

Music videos

- "Pokrovi Nebesnogo Startsa"
- "Slavsia, Rus!"
- "Goi, Rode, Goi!"
- "Liki Bessmertnykh Bogov"
- "Yarilo"
- "Stenka na Stenku"
- "Zov Pustyh Dereven'"
- "Serbia"
- "V pogonie za beloj ten'yu"

== See also ==
- Neopagan music
