= Russian boxing =

Bare-knuckle boxing

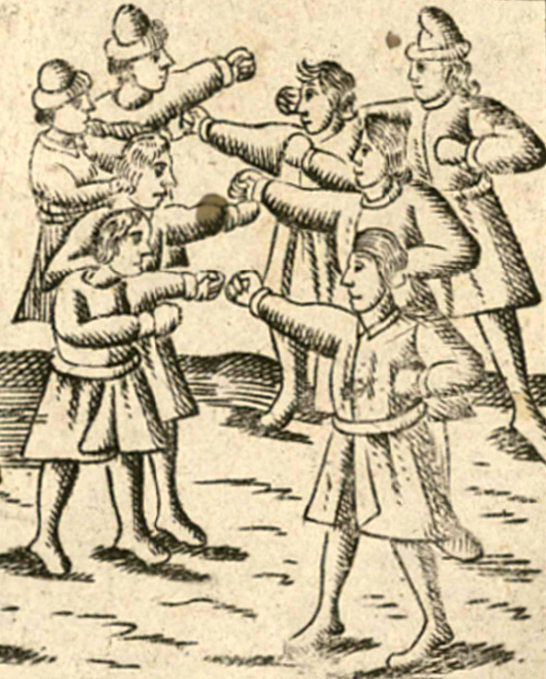
A lubok depiction of the "Wall on Wall" (Stenka na Stenku) fist fighting.

Russian boxing (Russian: Кулачный бой, romanized: Kulachniy Boy, lit. 'fist fighting, pugilism') is the traditional bare-knuckle boxing of Rus' and then Russia. Boxers will often train by punching buckets of sand to strengthen bones, and prepare minutes before the fights.

== History ==
The earliest accounts concerning the sport date to the 13th century. Supposedly, fist fighting was practiced even prior to the Christianization of Kievan Rus', at celebrations dedicated to Perun.

Metropolite Kiril, in 1274, created another one of many personally-instituted rules, declaring expulsion from Christianity for any of those who fist-fight and do not sing a prayer or hymn at the burial of someone who died during a fist fight. The government itself never supported, but also never opposed, fist fighting.

Russian boyars used the sport as mass entertainment, and acquired the best fighters for competitions.

The fights most often took place in holiday times and in crowded places. In winter it took place on ice. First the young children fought, then every pair was older than the previous, ending with the last and most notable fist fighters.

In two orders released in 1684 and 1686 fist fighting was forbidden, but the sport continued to be practiced.

All regions had their heroes in the sport, but the region with the most famous ones historically is Tula.

There are documents saying Peter the Great liked to organize fist fights "in order to show the ability of the Russian people".

In 1751, a mass fist fight took place on a street in Saint Petersburg, which came to the attention of Empress Elizabeth of Russia. After that the Empress forbade the organization of fist fights on the territory of Moscow and Saint Petersburg.

During the reign of Catherine the Great, the popularity of fist fighting was growing again, and it is said that Count Orlov was a good fist fighter himself and even invited notable fist fighters to compare powers.

In 1832, Nicholas I of Russia completely forbade fist fights as "harmful fun".

== Legacy ==
K.V. Gradopolov, then the most important Soviet specialist in boxing, authored a 1941 work about using proper technique when fist-fighting. In that book, he offered a new exercise, called "group boxing", and he mentioned it was an ancient Russian sport (what he was talking about was the "Stenka na Stenku" version).

== Rules and types ==
Every region in Russia incorporated different rules, unlike the sport of boxing. In some places they fought with bare arms, while in others they stretched their sleeves over the fists. There were cases where participants would cheat by putting iron under their sleeves.

There are three types of Russian fist fighting: the first is the singles type, a one-on-one fight; the second type is a team fight also known as "wall on wall". The third one, "catch drop", was the least practiced. There were several versions of the singles fight. One version was like modern boxing, where one fighter hits the other wherever he wants or can. The other version is when the fighters take turns hitting each other. Escaping from a punch, answering it not on turn, and moving aside were not allowed; all that could be done was to use the hands to try to protect one's own body. Victory could be achieved in a few ways: when one of the fighters falls, till first blood, or till one of the fighters gives up.

The "wall-on-wall" fight (with anywhere from dozen to several hundred participants) was performed strictly by rules and could go on for hours. Both "walls" had a chief fighter, who served as a tactician and a commanding officer. "Walls" themselves were tight straight formations 3-4 ranks deep. Repeated attacks were performed, aiming to push the opposing "wall" out of the game area. Basic tactics were used, such as breaching using heavy fighters (who were usually held in reserve), encircling, false retreat and others; but as a rule, tight wall formation was not broken. Tactics also included battle planning. The "wall-on-wall" fights, while performed for entertainment, were in fact close to military training. For example, notable ethnographer V. Gilyarovsky recalled that during his voluntary service in an infantry regiment, soldiers often staged wall-on-wall fistfights with factory workers.

A famous phrase in Russian, "Do not hit a man when he's down", has roots in that sport.

== Fist fighting in Russian popular culture ==
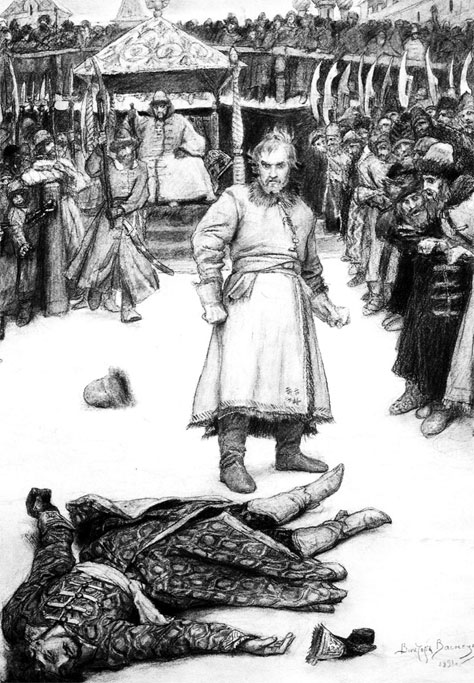
"Fistfight" (Kulachniy Boy), a drawing by Viktor Vasnetsov.

As for centuries fist fighting was so popular and was such a part of Russian folk life, it occurred frequently in Russian literature and art.

The most famous portrayal of a Russian fistfight is in Mikhail Lermontov's poem, "The Song of the Merchant Kalashnikov". There, the fistfight tales place as a form of honor duel between an oprichnik (government police agent) and a merchant. It is notable that, according to Lermontov, both characters use combat gloves ("rukavitsy", reinforced mittens). Though it may be an example of poetic license, the poem states that the first connected blow by Kalashnikov bent a large bronze cross hanging from his opponent's neck, and the second fractured the opponent's temple, killing him. The fight also features in the opera The Merchant Kalashnikov by Anton Rubinstein (1880).

In the 19th century Sergei Aksakov watched famous fist fights on the frozen Kaban Lakes in Kazan, and later wrote about them in his "Story about student life". Some decades later, at the same lake, the young future opera singer Feodor Chaliapin took part in a similar fight: "From one side came we, the Russians of Kazan, from the other side the Tatars. We fought hard without feeling sorry for ourselves, but never broke the historic rules of not to hit one that is already down, not to kick, and not to keep iron up one's sleeves". Later the young Chaliapin was attacked in a fight over a girl, but thanks to his proficiency in fist fighting, he won. He wrote: "He jumped to beat me, and even though I was afraid of the police, learning fist fighting at the frozen lakes of Kazan helped me, and he humiliatingly lost".

The Russian poet Sergei Yesenin in his autobiography tells that his grandfather taught him fist fighting.

One of the heroes in the book "Thief" by the Soviet novelist Leonid Leonov says, "In childhood, it happened, only in fist fights I found real friends... And was never wrong! Because only in a fight the whole human nature comes out".

Claims have been made that the Russian nobility favoured fistfights over duels, but on the other hand it has been suggested that the nobility actually were against fistfights and preferred weapons.

== See also ==
- Bare-knuckle boxing
- Burmese bareknuckle boxing
