= Rod (Slavic religion) =

Slavic personification of family, ancestors and fate

- Ancestors, fate, spiritual continuity, family continuity
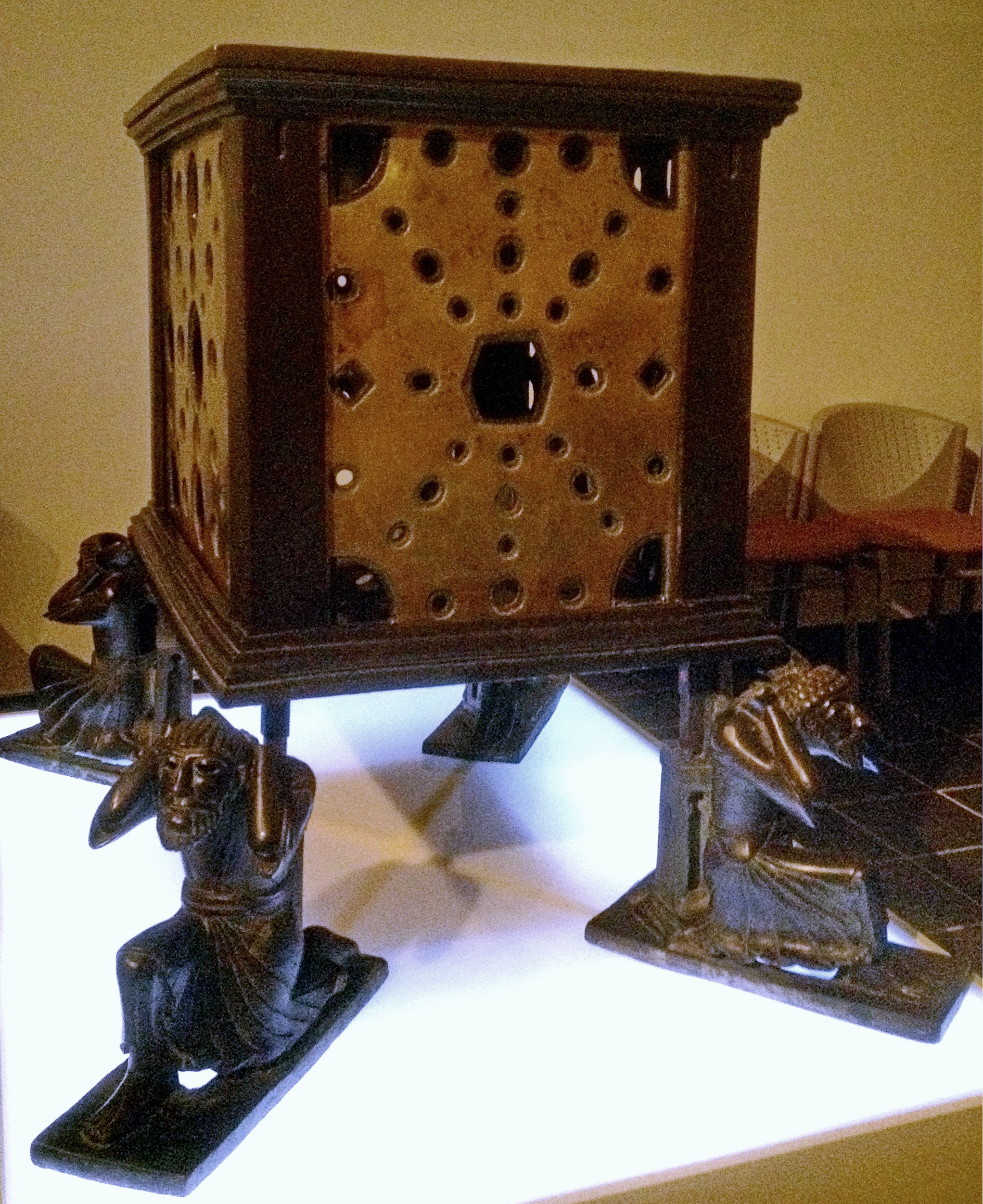
- The so-called Krodo altar of Goslar Museum, Germany, made in the late 11th century. The name Krodo, first mentioned in 1492, was given to it and allegedly made reference to Rod and its use in worship of Rod.
- Other names: Sud
- Abode: Vyraj
- Symbol: Rosette
- Ethnic group: East Slavs, South Slavs
- Consort: Rozhanitsa

Equivalents
- Roman: Quirinus
- Celtic: Toutatis

In the pre-Christian belief of East and South Slavs, Rod (Note: Slovenian, Croatian Bosnian: Rod, Belarusian, Bulgarian, Macedonian, Russian, Serbian Cyrillic: Род, Ukrainian Cyrillic: Рід.) ("Kin") is a personification of the family, ancestors and fate, and an alleged deity. Among Southern Slavs, he is also known as Sud ("Judgement"). He is usually mentioned together with Rozhanitsy (among Southern Slavs, the Suđenice), three fairies or sisters who influence events such as childbirth. One's first haircut (postryzhennya/postrzyżyny) was dedicated to him, in a celebration in which he and the rozhanitsy were given a meal and the cut hair. The personification of Rod lost its importance through time as it was chiefly tied to the peasant belief in ancestor veneration or fate manipulation, and in the ninth or tenth century such vernacular belief was replaced among the princely and warrior elite by polytheistic or henotheistic worship of Perun, Svarog and/or Svetevid – depending on the tribe; though these are sometimes cited as hypostases of one another – which explains his absence in the pantheon of Vladimir the Great.

While Rod is a known concept in pre-Christian Slavic beliefs, being a representation of kin or a personification of fate or judgement, the legitimacy of claims that he is or was ever a principal deity of the Slavs or even that he was worshipped as or considered a deity at all are controversial and frequently questioned or outright denied, including by authors Leo Klejn and Mikola Zubov. As such, he is sometimes wrongly classified as one of many pseudo-deities, despite evidence existing of his former status as a personification. This is further complicated by Rod's cult and deification now being chiefly associated with new religious movements and ethnonationalist sects such as Ynglism and Native Ukrainian National Faith who base their claims on the neopagan Rodnovery, which in turn takes its description of Rod's cult and attributes from the Book of Veles – a proven forgery – and romantic nationalist writings conflating Slavic pre-Christian beliefs with Vedic mythology. Furthermore, according to Procopius, Slavs did not believe in destiny:

For they believe that one god, the maker of lightning, is alone lord of all things, and they sacrifice to him cattle and all other victims; but as for fate, they neither know it nor do they in any wise admit that it has any power among men, but whenever death stands close before them, either stricken with sickness or beginning a war, they make a promise that, if they escape, they will straightway make a sacrifice to the god in return for their life; and if they escape, they sacrifice just what they have promised, and consider that their safety has been bought with this same sacrifice.

— Procopius

== Etymology ==
Rod's name is confirmed in Old Church Slavonic and Old East Slavic sources about pre-Christian Slavic religion. The name is derived from the Proto-Slavic word *rodъ, meaning "family", "birth", "origin", "clan", but also "yield", "harvest". Aleksander Brückner also notes the similarity of the name to the Avestan word rada-, meaning "guardian", "keeper".

== Sources ==
The first source mentioning Rod is the Word of St. Gregory the Theologian about how pagans bowed to idols, from the 11th century:

Also, this word reached the Slavs, and they began to offer sacrifices to Rod and the Rozhanitsy [fate-goddesses] before Perun, their god. And earlier, they offered sacrifices to vampires [upyrí] and bereginyas [water-sprites?]. But even now, on the outskirts, they pray to him, the cursed god Perun, and to Khors and Mokosh, and to the vilas - they do this in secret.

— Andrzej Szyjewski, Religia Słowian, pg. 170.

The Russian "Word of a certain Christ-lover":

...we also mix some pure prayers with cursed idolatrous offerings [when] others, in addition to the "lawful table", set out tables and dishes dedicated to Rod and the Rozhanitsy, offending God.

— Aleksander Brückner, Mitologja Słowiańska, 1918, pg. 105.

In a handwritten commentary on the Gospel from the 15th century, Rod defies the Christian god as the creator of humans:

So Rod is not sitting in the air, throwing clods to the ground, and from this children are born [...] because God is the creator, not Rod

The cult of Rod was still popular in 16th-century Rus, as evidenced by the penance given during confession by Orthodox priests as described in the penitentiaries of Saint Sabbas of Storozhi:

A clergyman should ask if she has mixed pagan beliefs with Christian ones, and if she has prayed to the vilas, or if she has eaten and consumed alcohol in honor of Rod and the Rozhanitsy and different gods such as Perun, Khors, and Mokosh: three years of fasting with prostrations as penance.

— Aleksander Brückner, Mitologja Słowiańska.

== Cult ==
According to ethnologist Halyna Lozko, Rod's Holiday was celebrated on December 23, or according to Czech historian and archaeologist Naďa Profantová, on December 26. Rod and the rozhanitsy were offered bloodless sacrifices in the form of bread, honey, cheese and groat (kutia). Before consuming the kutia, the father of the family, who took up the role of the volkhv or zhrets, tossed the first spoon up to the holy corner. This custom exists in Ukraine to this day. Then the feast began at a table in the shape of a trapezium. After the feast, they made requests to Rod and the rozhanitsy: "let all good things be born".

In Kievan Rus', after Christianization, feasts dedicated to Rod were still practiced, as mentioned in Word of a certain Christ-lover. In the first years of the existence of Saint Sophia's Cathedral in Kyiv, pagans came to celebrate Koliada there, which was later severely punished. The remains of the Rod cult were to survive until the 19th century.

== Interpretations ==
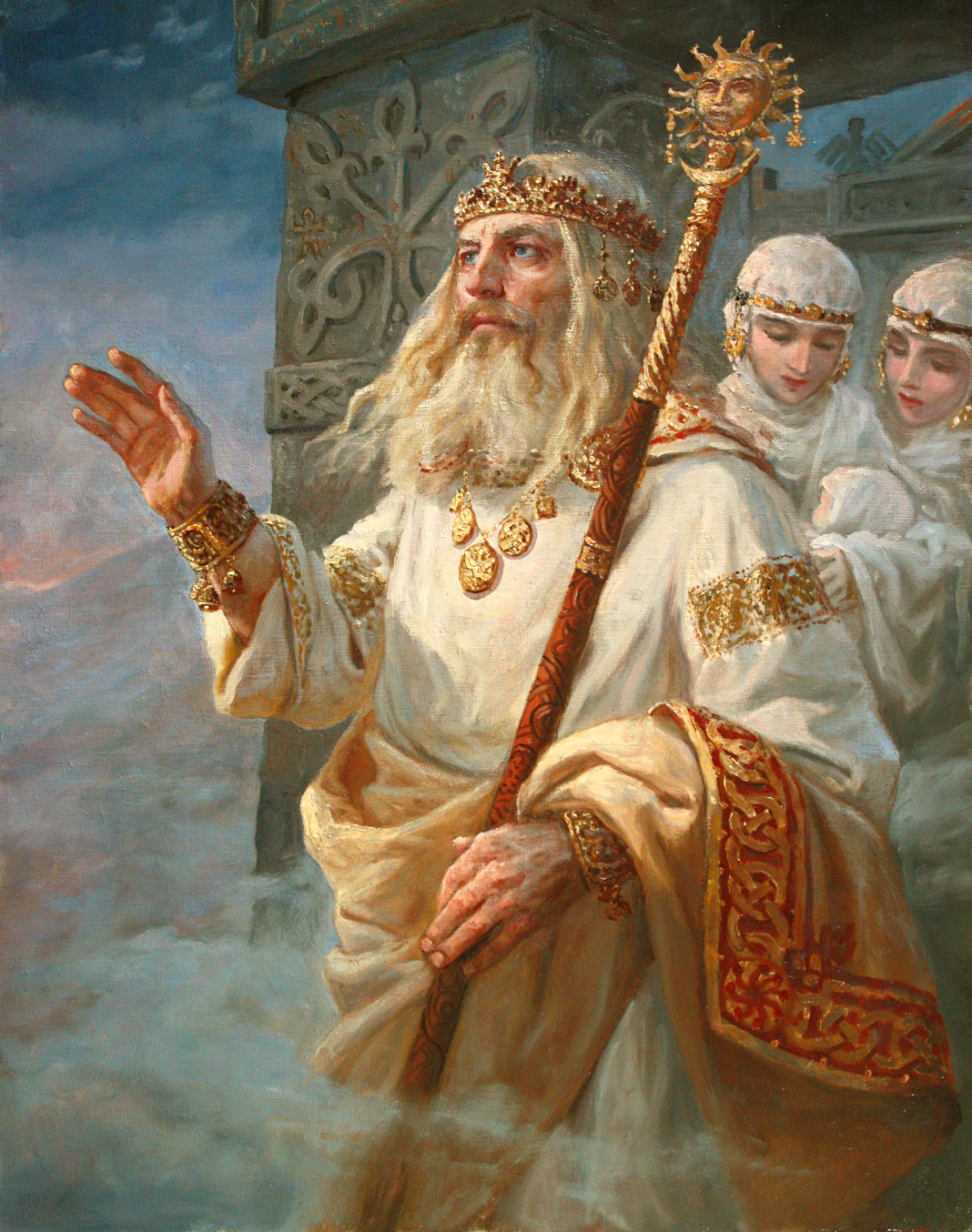
Rod and Rozhanitsy, Andrey Shishkin, 2014.

=== Scholars' opinions ===
==== Boris Rybakov ====
According to the concept presented by Boris Rybakov, Rod was originally the chief Slavic deity during the times of patriarchal agricultural societies in the first millennium CE, later pushed to a lower position, which would explain his absence in the pantheon of deities worshiped by Vladimir the Great. Rybakov relied on the Word of St. Gregory Theologian..., where the Slavs first sacrificed to wraiths, then to Rod and rozhanitsy, and finally to Perun, which would reflect the alleged evolution of Slavic beliefs from animism through cult of natural forces to henotheism. The sculpture known as Zbruch Idol was supposed to depict Rod as the main Slavic deity according to Rybakov's concept.

Rybakov also believes that all the circles and spiral symbols represent the different hypostases of Rod. Such symbols are to be "six-petal rose inscribed in a circle" (rosette) and the sign of the Thunderer ( ).

==== Leo Klejn and Mikola Zubov ====
These scholars criticized Rybakov's findings. In one of his works, Rybakov maintained that Perun could not be borrowed by the Vainakhs, since the supreme god of the Slavs was Rod, and Perun was introduced only by Vladimir as the druzhina patron. However, this is contradicted by the traces of Perun throughout Slavic territory. These researchers argue that it is necessary to identify traces of the original sources of texts and restore them to the historical context under which specific Old Russian texts were created. They believe that Old Russian authors, when describing Rod and rozhanitsy, used ready semantic blocks borrowed from other sources, mainly the Bible and writings of Greek theologians that were misinterpreted: in Byzantine Empire the horoscope was called "genealogy", which can literally be translated as "rodoslovo". Therefore, these researchers believe that the cult of Rod and parents did not exist in the pre-Christian religion of the Slavs. Zubov also believes that there was no extensive genealogy of the gods in the East Slav religion and Perun was the only god.

==== Aleksander Gieysztor ====
Gieysztor considers Rod the god of social organization. After Benveniste he compares him to the Roman Quirinus, whose name comes from *covir or curia, which can be translated as "god of the community of husbands", to the Umbrian Vofionus, whose name contains a root similar to the Indo-European word *leudho, Anglo-Saxon leode ("people"), Slavic *ludie and Polish ludzie, and to the Celtic Toutatis, whose name derives from the Celtic core *teuta meaning "family", but rejects connecting Rod with Indian Rudra.

Because of the function of fertility and wealth, he identifies with him the Belarusian Spor, a personification of abundance, fertility.

==== Andrzej Szyjewski ====
According to Andrzej Szyjewski, Rod "personifies the ideas of family kinship as a symbol of spiritual continuity (rodoslovo)." Rod was also to direct the souls of the dead to Vyraj, and then send them back to our world in the form of clods of earth cast down or entrusted to nightjars and storks.

==== Fyodor Kapitsa ====
According to the folklorist Fyodor Kapitsa, the cult of Rod and parents was almost completely forgotten over time. Rod transformed into a ghost – a patron of the family, a "home grandfather", and later a guardian of newborns and honoring ancestors. Traces of Rod's cult were mainly seen in everyday life. Remains of the Rod cult are to be Russian Orthodox holidays such as Day of the Dead (Holy Thursday) and Radonica (Tuesday of the first week after Easter) during which the dead are worshiped.

In the times of Kievan Rus in the 11th and 12th centuries, the cult of Rod was to be particularly important for princes because he was considered the patron of the unity of the clan, and the right to the throne and land of ancestors depended on it. Since fertility has always been associated with femininity, Rod's cult was traditionally feminine. Thus, female priestesses were associated with the cult of Rod, who were to sacrifice him or organize special feasts several times a year. Bread, porridge, cheese and honey were prepared for the feast, then such a meal was put in the shrines. It was believed that the gods appear there invisible to the human eye. Rod was sometimes called to protect people from illness, but rozhanitsy played a major role in this ritual.

==== Oleg Kutarev ====
Kutarev notes the similarity between the cult of Rod and the cult of the South Slavic Stopan and the East Slavic Domovoy – all were given a meal, they were to manage the fate and were associated with the worship of ancestors.

==== Viljo Mansikka ====
This Russian and Finnish philologist notes that sometimes in the Slavic languages the Greek term "τύχη" (týchi, "luck") is translated as rod, and "είμαρμένη" (eímarméni, "destiny") is translated as a rozhanitsa.

==== Jan Máchal ====
This Czech slavist claimed that Rod was a god who represented male ancestors and rozhanitsy represented female ancestors.

==== Halyna Lozko ====
According to Halynaa Losko, for Ukrainians Rod was god over the gods. He is the giver of life and was supposed to stay in heaven, ride on clouds and assign man his fate. Rod was the personification of the descendants of one ancestor, that is, he was associated with the entire family: dead ancestors, living people and unborn generations. Over time, Rod became a Domovoy whose figurines were owned by many families. Rod's and rozhanitsy images were also to appear on the rushnyks as motives of the tree of life. The 20th-century ethnographic finds show the door of huts with the image of a family tree: men were depicted on leaves and women on flowers of this tree. When someone was dying – a cross was drawn next to his name, when someone was being born – a new twig, leaf or flower was drawn.

=== Rodnovers' opinions ===
Russian Rodnovers Veleslav (Ilya Cherkasov) and Dobroslav (Alexey Dobrovolsky) describe Rod as a life force, the god "all-pervading" and "omnipresent." In cosmology, considered the source of cosmic emanation, which is expressed in the hierarchy of the gods.

== Bibliography ==
- Szyjewski, Andrzej (2003). Religia Słowian (in Polish). Krakow: Wydawnictwo WAM. ISBN 83-7318-205-5.
- Gieysztor, Aleksander (2006). Mitologia Słowian (in Polish). Warsaw: Wydawnictwa Uniwersytetu Warszawskiego. ISBN 83-235-0234-X.
- Strzelczyk, Jerzy (2007). Mity, podania i wierzenia dawnych Słowian (in Polish). Poznań: Dom Wydawniczy Rebis. ISBN 978-83-7301-973-7.
- Brückner, Aleksander (1985). Mitologia słowiańska (in Polish). Warsaw: Państwowe Wydawnictwo Naukowe. ISBN 83-01-06245-2.
- Ivanits, Linda J. (1989). Russian Folk Belief. M. E. Sharpe. ISBN 0765630885.
- Wilson, Andrew (2015). The Ukrainians: Unexpected Nation, Fourth Edition. Yale University Press. ISBN 978-0300219654.
- Polakow, Aleksander (2017). Русская история с древности до XVI века (in Russian). Litres. ISBN 978-5040094677.
- Aitamurto, Kaarina (2016). Paganism, Traditionalism, Nationalism: Narratives of Russian Rodnoverie. Routledge. ISBN 978-1472460271.
- Losko, Halynaa (1997). Rodzima wiara ukraińska (in Polish). ISBN 8385559264.
- Mansikka, Viljo Jan (2005). Религия восточных славян (in Russian). Gorky Institute of World Literature. ISBN 5920802383.
- Klejn, Leo (2004). Воскрешение Перуна. К реконструкции восточнославянского язычества (in Russian). Eurasia. ISBN 5-8071-0153-7.
- Pokorny, Julius (2005). Indogermanisches etymologisches Wörterbuch (in German). Francke. ISBN 3-7720-0947-6.
- Profantová, Naďa (2004). Encyklopedie slovanských bohů a mýtů (in Czech). Libri. ISBN 8072772198.
