= Sonic Seducer =

German music magazine

- Front cover of the 150th issue, July 2012
- Editor-In-Chief: Sascha Blach
- Categories: Music
- Frequency: 10 times per year
- Circulation: 37753
- Publisher: Thomas Vogel
- First issue: 1994
- Company: Thomas Vogel Media e. K.
- Country: Germany
- Based in: Dinslaken
- Language: German
- Website: www.sonic-seducer.de

Sonic Seducer is a German music magazine that covers gothic rock, new wave, EBM and other kinds of electronic music and culture. The magazine is noted for organizing the annual M'era Luna Festival. Since its inception in 1994, the Sonic Seducer has become one of the major publications of the dark culture in Germany.

== Content ==
The magazine focuses on a variety of musical genres like alternative rock, heavy metal, mittelalter rock, Neue Deutsche Härte, electronic rock, pop rock, futurepop, aggrotech, power noise, crossover as well as dark wave, gothic music and industrial. Each issue contains interviews with bands and stories about bands and projects, reviews of concerts, record releases, books and games but also schedules of upcoming band tours and a news section. Moreover, there are frequent special editions on topics like Mittelalter rock, record labels, films or studio reports.

Since 1999, each issue comes with Cold Hands Seduction, a compilation CD and sometimes a DVD which contains music by artists featured in the print issue. It focuses not only on established bands but it also presents upcoming artists.

== Upcoming artists contest ==
Sonic Seducer organises an annual "Battle of the Bands", a competition for upcoming musical artists. Since year 2000, 30 new bands without a record label deal are featured on the CD of the December issue. Together with the magazine's readership a professional jury elects the best acts that will be rewarded a label contract with Out of Line.

== Festivals ==
Sonic Seducer presents the M'era Luna Festival, a festival of the German alternative music scene that attracts some 20,000 attendants annually. Once a year the board of editors compiles a M'era Luna Festival CD with songs by musical acts that are present at the festival. The subsequent magazine issues feature extensive reports and a DVD documentation.

== See also ==
- Zillo
