= Kilkim Žaibu =

Annual metal music festival in Lithuania

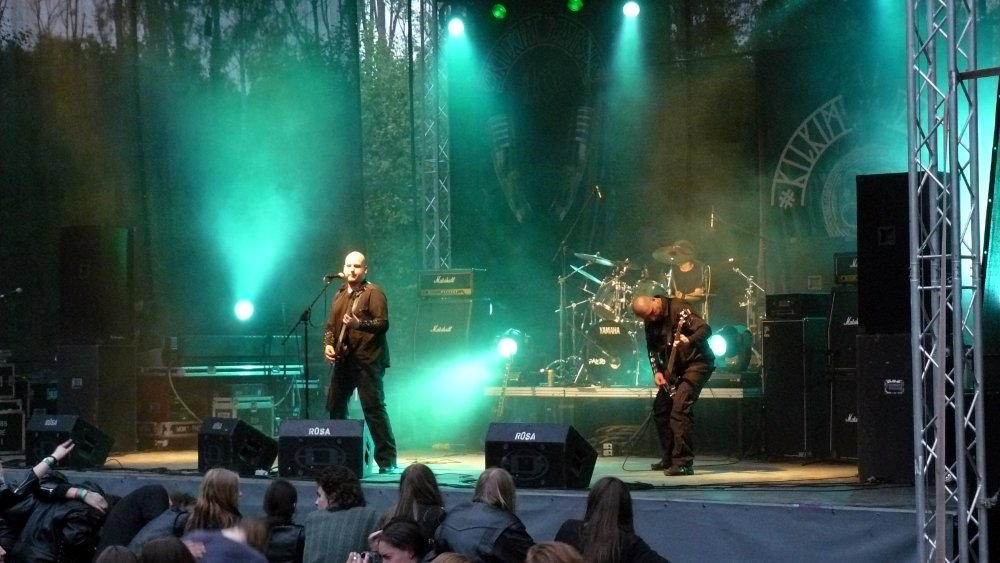
- Genre: black metal, death metal, pagan metal, heavy metal, folk music
- Dates: June, July
- Locations: Joniškis, (1999–2009) Varniai, Lithuania (2010–2014); Žagarė, Lithuania (2015); Varniai, Lithuania (2016–2021) Ukmergės r.sav.,Lithuania(2022-present)
- Years active: 1999–present
- Founders: "Pikuolis" club
- Website: kilkimzaibu.com

Kilkim Žaibu (from Lithuanian "arise/soar with the lightning") is an extreme metal festival in Lithuania, held annually since 1999. The festival distinguishes itself from other major metal festivals by incorporating the shows of metal aesthetic-related performers such as medieval folk bands and historical reconstruction clubs, as well as a blacksmith and artisan market.

From 2010, the festival has taken place at Lūkstas Lake in the town of Varniai, Lithuania. Before that, it had been happening at "Plūgo broliai" in Joniškis, Lithuania.

Between 2,000 and 3,000 people visit the festival annually from various countries. Bands have performed at Kilkim Žaibu festivals from Australia, Norway, Hungary, Czech Republic, Romania, Ukraine, Russia, Sweden, Finland, Germany and neighbouring countries.

== Kilkim Žaibu 19 ==
The festival took place in Varniai, Lithuania on 28–30 June 2018.

Kilkim Žaibu 19 lineup:
Thursday	Friday	Saturday
(Lithuania) Gyvata; (Lithuania) Sen Svaja; (Latvia) Vilki; (Finland) Finntroll; (Lithuania) Kielwater	(Lithuania) Cunabula; (Estonia) Deceitome; (Lithuania) Juodvarnis; (Finland) Havukruunu; (Poland) Mentor; (Lithuania) Nahash; (Norway) Mortiis; (Lithuania) Obelija; (Latvia) Green Novice; (Sweden) Apocalypse Orchestra; (Lithuania) Žalvarinis; (Sweden) Thyrfing; (Denmark) Myrkur	(Latvia) Rebel Riot; (Lithuania) Phrenetix; (Ukraine) Ignea; (Sweden) The Aeon; (Poland) Infernal War; (Ukraine) Joryj Kloc; (Ukraine) Kzohh; (Ukraine) White Ward; (Poland) Lord Wind; (Scotland) SAOR; (Sweden) Entombed A.D.; (United States) I Am Morbid; (Ukraine) Nokturnal Mortum

== Kilkim Žaibu 18 ==
The festival took place in Varniai, Lithuania on 29 June – 1 July 2017.

Kilkim Žaibu 18 lineup:
Thursday	Friday	Saturday
(Sweden) Grimner; (Latvia) Skyforger; (Lithuania) Romowe Rikoito; (Latvia) Delve; (Lithuania) Obelija	(Sweden) Månegarm; (Poland) Mgła; (Finland) Archgoat; (Austria) Harakiri for the Sky; (Ukraine) 1914; (Turkey) Khepra; (Latvia) Frailty; (Lithuania) Marga Muzika; (Lithuania) Velnezers; (Lithuania) Ūkanose; (Belarus) Shaman Jungle; (Lithuania) Autism; (Lithuania) The BlastBeets	(Norway) Abbath; (Norway) Vulture Industries; (Sweden) Valkyrja; (United Kingdom) Bossk; (Lithuania) Obtest; (Estonia) Loits; (Lithuania) Au-dessus; (Latvia) Pulse of Nebulae; (Lithuania) Extravaganza; (Lithuania) Ugniavijas; (Lithuania) Murder One / (United Kingdom) Dani Divine; (Lithuania) Pekla; (Latvia) Rāva

== Kilkim Žaibu 17 ==
The festival took place in Varniai, Lithuania on 23–25 June 2016.

Kilkim Žaibu 17 lineup:
Thursday	Friday	Saturday
(Lithuania) / (Republic of Ireland) Romuvos; (Lithuania) Rasa Serra ir Saulius Petreikis; (Latvia) Obscurus Orbis; (Lithuania) Gyvata; (Lithuania) Rana	(Sweden) Nifelheim; (Austria) Schirenc Plays Pungent Stench; (Germany) The Ruins of Beverast; (Sweden) Ereb Altor; (United Kingdom) Scythian; (Poland) Valkenrag; (Latvia) Protean; (Ukraine) Joryj Kloc; (Lithuania) Žalvarinis; (Lithuania) Andaja	(United Kingdom) Venom; (Austria) Belphegor; (Ukraine) Dirty Shirt; (Sweden) Saturnalia Temple; (Ukraine) Sectorial; (Estonia) Horricane; (Latvia) Eschatos; (Latvia) Catalepsia

== Kilkim Žaibu 16 ==
The festival took place in Žagarė, Lithuania on 26–27 June 2015.

Kilkim Žaibu 16 lineup:
Friday	Saturday
(Switzerland) Bölzer; (Estonia) Thou Shell of Death; (Latvia) Skyforger; (Lithuania) Skylė; (Sweden) King of Asgard; (Lithuania) Angis; (Lithuania) Ūkanose; (Latvia) Rāva; (Lithuania) Gyvata	(Switzerland) Triptykon; (Belgium) Enthroned; (Finland) Turmion Kätilöt; (Hungary) Dalriada; (Latvia) Auļi; (Latvia) Neglected Fields; (Ukraine) Raventale; (Estonia) Aghor; (Lithuania) Tuurngait

== Kilkim Žaibu 15 ==
The festival took place in Varniai, Lithuania on 20–22 June 2014.

Kilkim Žaibu 15 lineup:
Friday	Saturday	Sunday
(Norway) Wardruna; (Poland) Percival Schuttenbach; (Latvia) Vilki; (Lithuania) Sen Svaja; (Poland) Percival	(Finland) Moonsorrow; (Netherlands) Asphyx; (Latvia) Skyforger; (Germany) Endstille; (Lithuania) Meressin; (Sweden) Ereb Altor; (Latvia) Obscurus Orbis; (Belarus) Osterweg; (Latvia) Green Novice; (Estonia) Paean	(Greece) Rotting Christ; (Ukraine) Nokturnal Mortum; (Australia) Deströyer 666; (Norway) Vulture Industries; (Poland) / (Republic of Ireland) Thy Worshiper; (Lithuania) Luctus; (Lithuania) Juodvarnis; (Estonia) Thrashless; (Lithuania) Phrenetix; (Lithuania) NRCSSST

== Kilkim Žaibu 14 ==
The festival took place in Varniai, Lithuania on 21–23 June 2013. The line-up:

Kilkim Žaibu 14 line-up:
Friday	Saturday	Sunday
(Lithuania) Obelija; (Lithuania) Sen Svaja; (Latvia) Obscurus Orbis; (Lithuania) Vaiguva; (Lithuania) Ontrēp	(Lithuania) Gyvata; (Lithuania) Spanxti; (Estonia) Oort; (Lithuania) Marga muzika; (Belarus) Stary Olsa; (Germany) Desaster; (Iceland) Sólstafir; (Lithuania) Aistė Smilgevičiūtė ir grupė Skylė; (Norway) Einherjer; (Lithuania) Obtest	(Latvia) Malduguns; (Ukraine) Balfor; (Lithuania) Nahash; (Ukraine) Khors; (Lithuania) Paralytic; (United States) Exhumed; (Romania) Dordeduh; (Finland) Horna; (Germany) Destruction; (Finland) Turisas

- (Latvia) Baltic Snakes
- (Lithuania) Sūduvos tauras
- (Lithuania) Jotvos sūnūs
- (Poland) Pera Sudinoi
- (Lithuania) Leitgiris
- (Latvia) Heiligenberg

== Kilkim Žaibu 13 ==
The festival took place in Varniai, Lithuania on 22–24 June 2012. Line-up:

Kilkim Žaibu 13 line-up:
Friday	Saturday	Sunday
(Lithuania) Pekla; (Belarus) Znich; (Lithuania) Žalvarinis; (Lithuania) Auļi; (Germany) Wolfchant; (Estonia) Mestatoll; (Lithuania) Ratainyčia; (Lithuania) Obelija; (Lithuania) Ugniavijas; (Latvia) Obscurus Orbis; (Lithuania) Vaiguva	(Latvia) Urskumug; (Poland) Christ Agony; (Ukraine) Kroda; (Australia) Gospel of the Horns; (Norway) Helheim; (Russia) Arkona; (Lithuania) Katedra Lead Duet; (Norway) Taake; (Netherlands) Melechesh; (Lithuania) Sen Svaja; (Lithuania) Kovarnis; (Russia) Rarog; (Germany) Trimonium	(Lithuania) Crypts of Despair; (Lithuania) Juodvarnis; (Lithuania) Mandragora; (Lithuania) Agonija

- (Latvia) Pajauta
- (Lithuania) Stebulė
- (Lithuania) Kovarnis
- (Lithuania) Jotva
- (Latvia) Ugunszīme
- (Lithuania) Varingis
- (Lithuania) Sūduvos Tauras

== Kilkim Žaibu 12 ==
The festival took place in Varniai, Lithuania on 23–25 June 2011. The line-up:

Kilkim Žaibu 12 line-up:
Thursday	Friday	Saturday
(Lithuania) Kovarnis; (Romania) Din Brad; (Lithuania) Ugniavijas; (Latvia) Vilki; (Lithuania) Marga Muzika; (Russia) Krynica; (Lithuania) A. Smilgevičiūtė ir grupė Skylė; (Romania) Negură Bunget; (Lithuania) Liepsnojantis Šerkšnas	(Belarus) Gods Tower; (Russia) Temnozor; (Ukraine) Khors; (Lithuania) Meressin; (Lithuania) Luctus; (Greece) Rotting Christ; (Germany) Mekong Delta; (Latvia) Skyforger	(Lithuania) Ugniavijas; (Lithuania) Kovarnis

- (Lithuania) Vaiguva
- (Lithuania) Pajauta
- (Latvia) Stebule
- (Lithuania) Dvargantis

== Kilkim Žaibu 11 ==
The festival in 2010 year first time took place at lake Lukstas in Varniai, Lithuania on 11–12 June 2010. The lineup:

Kilkim Žaibu 11 line-up:
Saturday	Sunday
(Estonia) Bestia; (Lithuania) Inquisitor; (Lithuania) Ossastorium; (Lithuania) Nahash; (Finland) Azaghal; (Australia) Deströyer 666	(Lithuania) Thundertale; (Lithuania) Ugniavijas; (Poland) Percival; (Poland) Percival Schuttenbach; (Republic of Ireland) Primordial; (Poland) Christ Agony; (Lithuania) Poccoulus; (Ukraine) Nokturnal Mortum; (Lithuania) Obtest

- (Lithuania) Kovarnis – Lietuvos karių klubas

== Kilkim Žaibu 10 ==
The festival took place at "Plūgo Broliai", Joniškis, Lithuania on 12–13 June 2009. The line-up:

Kilkim Žaibu 10 line-up:
Friday	Saturday
(Latvia) Nycticorax; (Poland) Saltus; (Lithuania) Argharus; (Czech Republic) Root; (Poland) Infernal War	(Lithuania) Atalyja; (Latvia) Vilki; (Lithuania) Vilkatlakai; (Lithuania) Hospitalierių Ordina; (Estonia) Metsatöll; (Estonia) Loits; (Sweden) Amon Amarth; (Latvia) Skyforger; (Finland) Impaled Nazarene; (Lithuania) Meressin

== Kilkim Žaibu 9 ==
The festival took place at "Plūgo Broliai", Joniškis, Lithuania on 7 June 2008. The line-up:

Kilkim Žaibu 9 line-up:
Sunday
- (Lithuania) Nahash
- (Belgium) Ancient Rites
- (Lithuania) Obtest
- (Estonia) Tharaphita
- (Latvia) Urskumug
- (Lithuania) Altaja – ugnies šou
- (Lithuania) Žalvarinis
- (Latvia) Auļi
- (Latvia) Vilki
- (Lithuania) Varingis
- (Lithuania) Kovarnis

== Pre-2008 history ==
The bands that have performed at this festival since 1999 include:

- (Hungary) Sear Bliss
- (Ukraine) Nokturnal Mortum
- (Germany) Odroerir
- (Finland) Moonsorrow
- (Estonia) Bestia
- (Latvia) Flaying
- (Latvia) Preternatural
- (Estonia) URT
- (Lithuania) Zpoan Vtenz
- (Latvia) Miseria
- (Latvia) Heaven Grey
- (Lithuania) Ugnėlakis
- (Lithuania) Liūnuosna
- (Lithuania) D.A.R
- (Lithuania) Profane Probity
- (Lithuania) Donis
- (Lithuania) Notanga
- (Estonia) Sinimaniseele
- (Latvia) Vilkači
- (Estonia) Meinardus
- (Lithuania) Andaja
- (Lithuania) Ossastorium
- (Estonia) Ugly Ogre
- (Lithuania) Baltuva
- (Lithuania) Thundertale
- (Latvia) Trejasmens
- (Lithuania) Soul Brothers
- (Latvia) Dark Domination
