= Ukrainian metal =

Heavy metal music scene of Ukraine

- Stylistic origins: Heavy metal music
- Cultural origins: 1990s, Ukraine
- Typical instruments: Electric guitar, electric bass guitar, drum kit, vocals

Other topics
- Ukrainian folk music, pop music in Ukraine, Ukrainian rock

Ukrainian metal is the heavy metal music scene of Ukraine. The most common Ukrainian heavy metal subgenres are black, pagan, folk and death metal. The most popular and well-known bands are black metal bands Nokturnal Mortum and Kroda.

Metalcore bands Jinjer (founded in 2008) and Space of Variations (founded in 2009) signed a contract with Napalm Records. Stoned Jesus, Motanka, 1914 (founded in 2014) and IGNEA (founded in 2015) are Ukraine's newest metal bands with international notoriety. 0%Mercury (founded in 2016) won 3rd place in the 2023 Wacken Open Air metal battle competition.

Among the biggest festivals were Metal Heads Mission (Crimea), Carpathian Alliance (Lviv oblast), Global East (Kyiv), ProRock (Kyiv). Media: among some old and established on ex-USSR territory paper magazines such as Terroraiser, Atmosfear there is also English-language portal Antichrist magazine (since 2003).

== History ==
=== 1990s ===
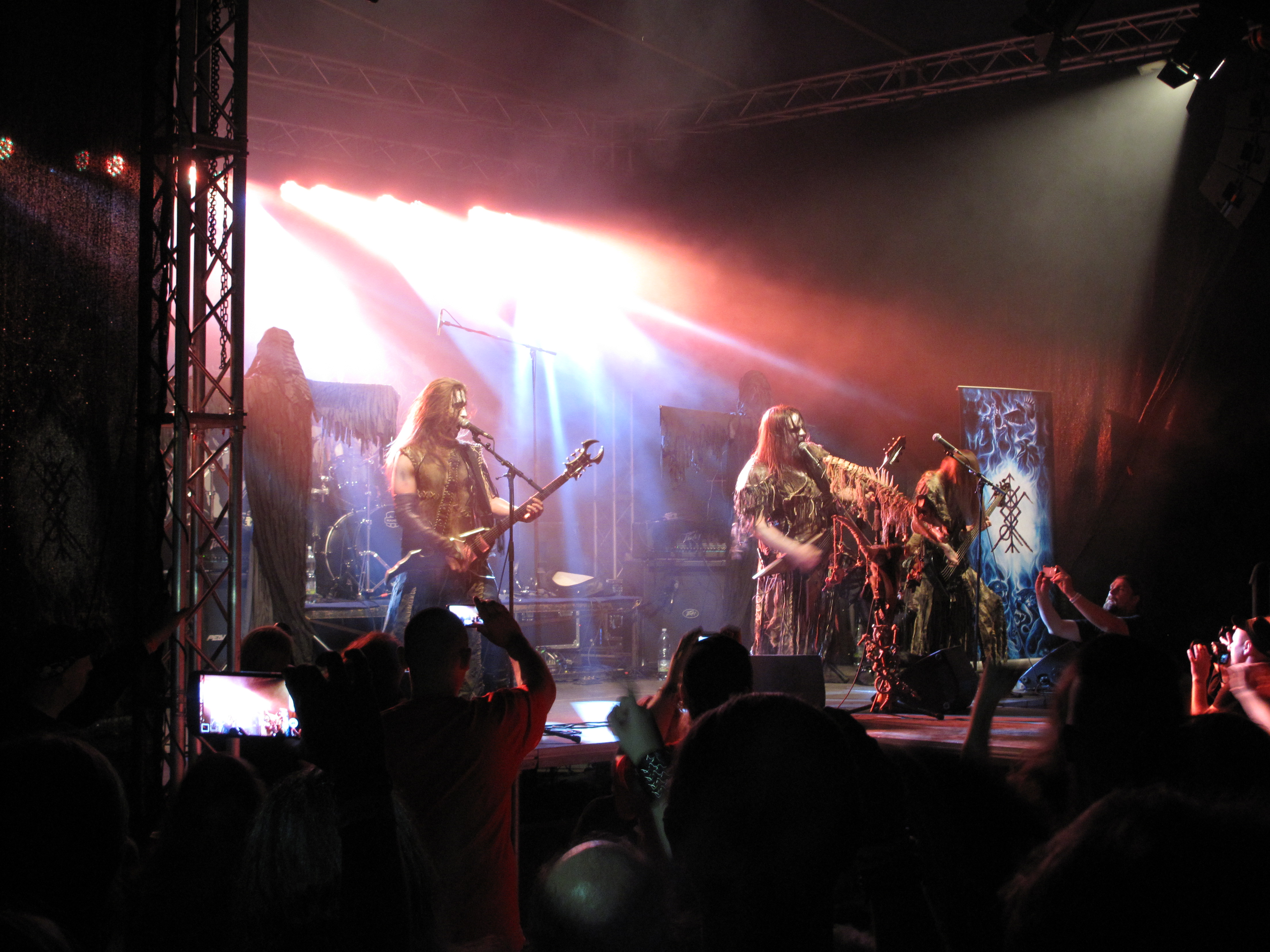
Nokturnal Mortum at Hell Fast Attack festival, 2015

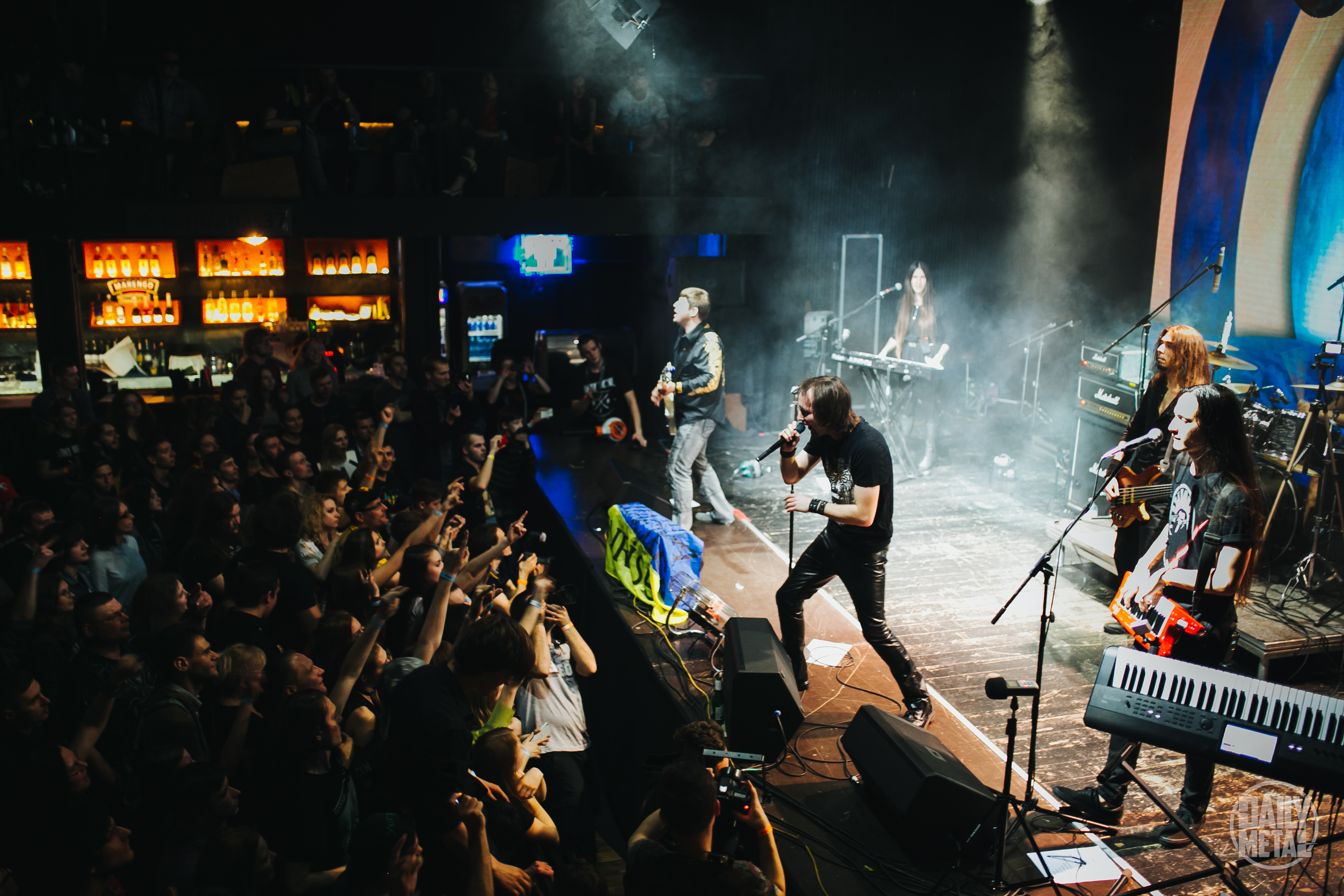
Sunrise performing live in Kyiv, 2016

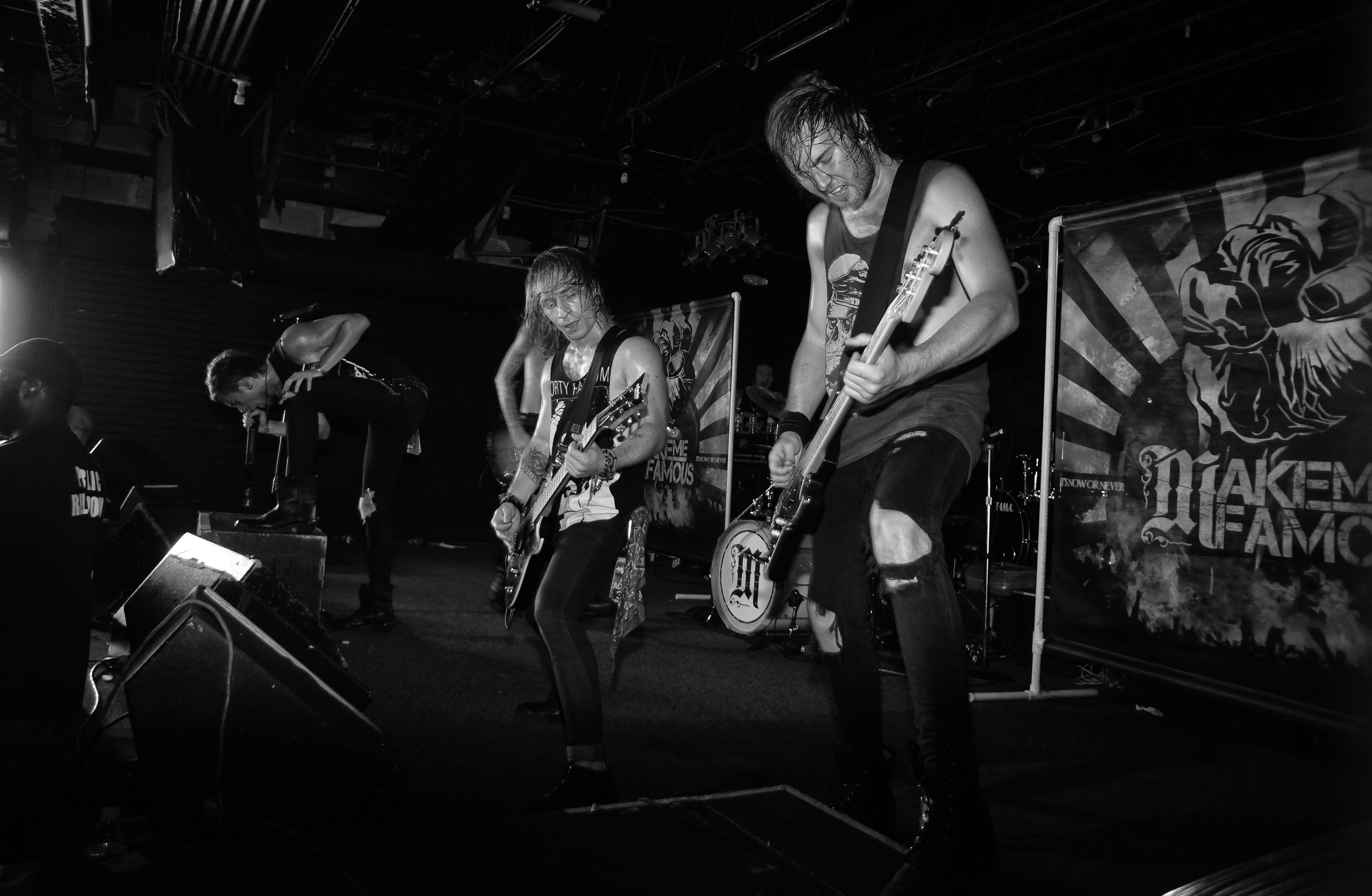
Make Me Famous performing live in Allentown, Pennsylvania, U.S. in August 2012

Nokturnal Mortum started as a death metal band called Suppuration in 1991, then they turned to black metal and changed name to Crystaline Darkness but "had to change the name back between 1993 and 1994 to Nocturnal Mortum because there already existed a band with that name in the western underground." Then the band "changed the letter so that we wouldn't find a band with the same name again like it was the case with Crystaline Darkness." Nokturnal Mortum gained their first Western recognition with the release of their album Goat Horns, their second full-length album, notable for having two keyboardists play on the album, often on the same song, and for mixing traditional Ukrainian music with black metal.

The band's first albums were released through The End Records and (as licence pressings) through Nuclear Blast, but the label and band separated after releasing the album Nechrist and a re-release of the Lunar Poetry demo due to a disagreement. According to Varggoth, "We had a contract with The End Records but it was broken. We have different points of view. They didn't like our policy, we didn't like the way they do business. They owe us some money. That was enough for a conflict."

Band frontman Knjaz Varggoth is one of the foremost figures in Eastern European National Socialist Black Metal (NSBM) and has played in various NSBM bands, like Aryan Terrorism, Warhead and Temnozor. Nokturnal Mortum's albums "Weltanschauung" and the live album "Live in Katowice" were released by No Colours Records, a German label associated with NSBM. In an interview with Frostkamp, Varggoth said that the album "Weltanschauung" is influenced by Miguel Serrano, a former Chilean diplomat, holocaust denier and major figure in Esoteric Hitlerism.

=== 2000s ===
Kroda is a black metal band formed in 2003 in Dnipropetrovsk. The band's primary lyrical themes are paganism, nature and history. Their sixth full-length album was released on 1 May 2015.

The band was formed by two musicians, Eisenslav and Viterzgir, in March 2003. The name of the band was taken from the Old East Slavic language and means "The fire of burial bonfire". According to legend, when the bodies of the warriors burned, their souls were carried away with the smoke to the Heavenly Palaces of the Gods. The smoke was a kind of a guide to Rod. In Sanskrit, the word kroda means anger, rage. Thus, the meaning of the name reveals the concept of the band.

In May 2004, Kroda released their debut full-length album Поплач мені, річко... (Cry To Me, River...) on Stellar Winter Records.

Their second album До небокраю життя... (Towards The Firmaments Verge of Life...) was recorded from January to April 2005, and was released on 20 July the same year. In 2012 it was remastered and reissued on Purity Through Fire Records in Germany.

In August 2007, Kroda made their first live performance at the Ukriainian metal music festival "Svarohovo Kolo II", which was held in Sevastopol. On 22 December, the band participates in the "Kolovorot Fest" in Kharkiv.

=== 2010s ===
Make Me Famous were a Ukrainian metalcore band. They were founded in 2010 by rhythm guitarist and co-vocalist Denis Shaforostov, who gained popularity through his YouTube channel "above92". They have released one studio album, titled It's Now or Never. IGNEA is a Symphonic/Melodic Death Metal band from Kyiv, formed in 2013. In 2021, they signed with Napalm Records.

== See also ==
- Ukrainian rock
- Music of Ukraine
