= Knjaz Varggoth =

Ukrainian black metal musician

Knjaz Varggoth Князь Варґґот
- Born: Yevhen Oleksandrovych Hapon; 30 July 1974 (age 51); Kharkiv, Ukrainian SSR, Soviet Union
- Genres: Black metal; Pagan metal
- Occupations: Guitarist; Singer
- Instruments: Guitar; Singing
- Years active: 1991–Present
- Labels: Oriana; Osmose Productions; No Colours Records; The End Records; Nuclear Blast; Resistance Records
- Member of: Nokturnal Mortum
- Formerly of: Mistigo Varggoth Darkestra; Aryan Terrorism

Yevhen Oleksandrovych Hapon (Note: Ukrainian: Євген Олександрович Гапон, romanized: Yevhen Oleksandrovych Hapon; Russian: Евгений Александрович Гапон, romanized: Yevgeny Aleksandrovich Gapon) (born 30 July 1974, known by his stage name Knjaz Varggoth) (Note: Ukrainian: Князь Варґґот, romanized: Kniaz Varggot) is a Ukrainian guitarist and singer, who performs in the black metal act Nokturnal Mortum.

== Biography ==
Yevhen Hapon was born 30 July 1974 in Kharkiv. He is one of the foremost figures in Eastern Europe black metal. Though he has been involved with numerous music projects and bands (Aryan Terrorism, Mistigo Varggoth Darkestra, Lucifugum as a guest musician in 1997, Вече, and more), he is most well known for being the lead vocalist and guitarist for the controversial Ukrainian black metal band Nokturnal Mortum. Nokturnal Mortum gained their reputation performing symphonic black metal with elements of Ukrainian and Slavic folk music and for being a part of the eastern European NSBM scene.

A side project done by Varggoth is the ambient/black metal project Mistigo Varggoth Darkestra, formed in 1994. The most famous album of this project, The Key to the Gates of the Apocalypse, is most likely known particularly due to its long runtime (one 72-minute track) and combination of dark ambient and fast black metal.

== Discography ==
=== Bands (in order of formation) ===
==== Suppuration ====
- 1992: Ecclesiastical Blasphemy

==== Crystaline Darkness ====
- 1993: Mi Agama Khaz Mifisto

==== Mistigo Varggoth Darkestra ====
- 1997: Midnight Fullmoon
- 1999: The Key to the Gates of the Apocalypse

==== Nokturnal Mortum ====
- 1995: Twilightfall
- 1996: Lunar Poetry
- 1997: Goat Horns
- 1998: To the Gates of Blasphemous Fire
- 1999: Nechrist
- 2005: Weltanschauung
- 2009: The Voice of Steel
- 2017: Verity

=== Aryan Terrorism ===
- 2002: W.A.R

==== Vetche ====
- 1998: Vetche

==== Piorun ====
- 2004: Stajemy Jak Ojce

==== Temnozor ====
Live member
