= Khors (band) =

Ukrainian metal band

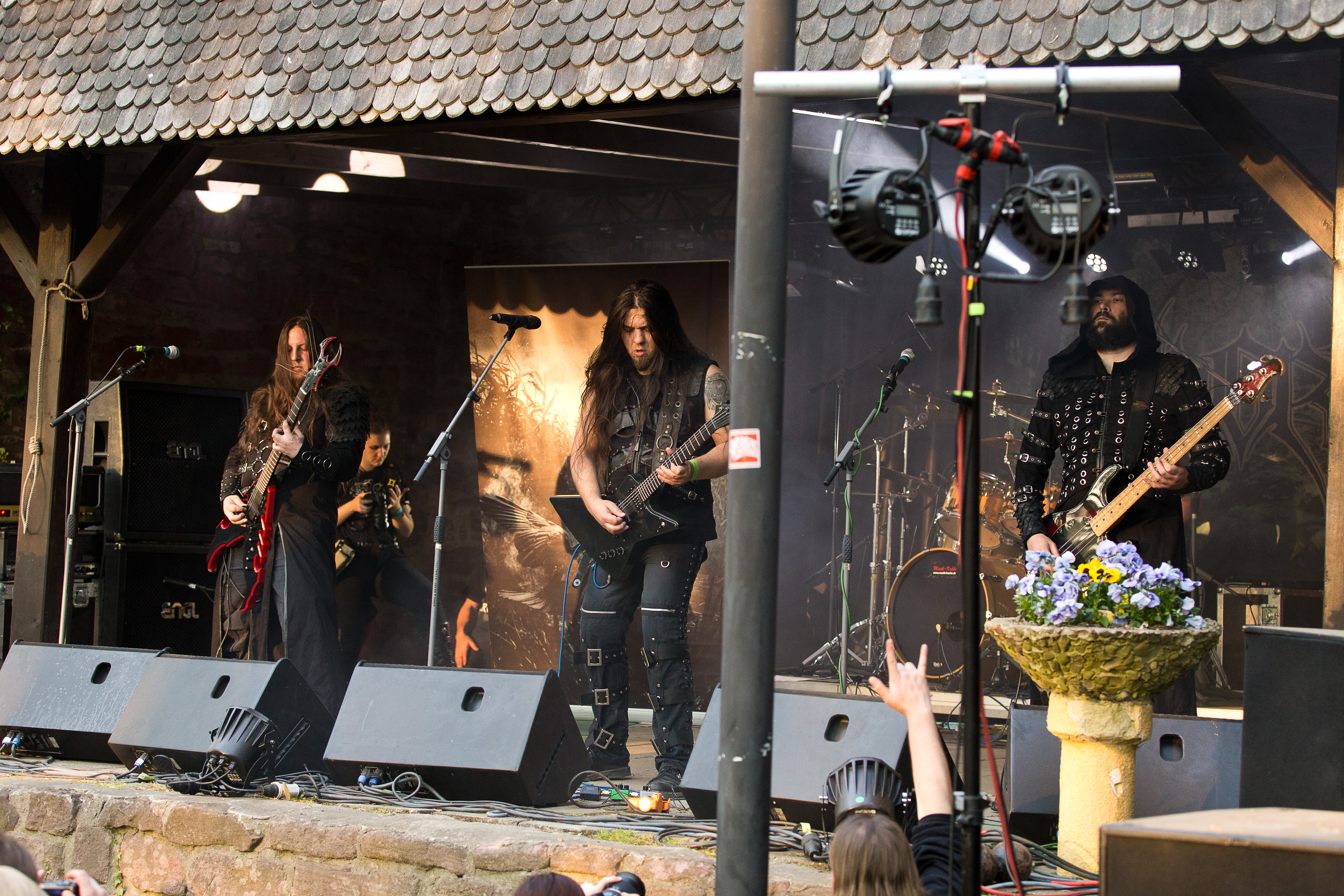
- Khors at Dark Troll Fest 2016

Background information
- Origin: Kharkiv
- Genres: Black metal, Pagan metal
- Years active: 2004–present
- Label: Paragon Records Candlelight Records
- Members: Jurgis; Andres; Khorus; Khaoth
- Past members: Helg; Warth; Nort
- Website: khors.info

Khors is a Ukrainian black metal and pagan metal band formed in 2004 in Kharkiv by Khorus, the former bass guitarist of Astrofaes. Stylistically Khors blends a few of metal’s sub-genres together, and also is characterized as heathen dark metal. The band recorded eight full-length albums: The Flame of Eternity’s Decline (2005), Cold (2006), Mysticism (2008), Return To Abandoned (2010), Wisdom of Centuries (2012), Night Falls Onto the Front of Ours (2015), Where the Word Acquires Eternity (2020), and Letters to the Future Self (2024). The group keeps an active touring and performed with groups like Enslaved, Samael, Moonspell, Behemoth, Gorgoroth, Cynic, Obtest and many others. Khors has participated in a number of European festivals such as Motocultor Festival, Kilkim Žaibu, Ragnard Rock, OST, Dark Troll, Gothoom, Aurora Infernalis, Hell Fast Attack, Metal Head's Mission, Oskorei, and Carpathian Alliance.

== History ==
The group was formed in 2004 with the former bass guitarist of Astrofaes, Khorus, who left the group to create his own project. In August 2004 the drummer Khaoth, a former member of Astrofaes and Tessaract, has become a part of the band. Then, at a later date, the guitarist and vocalist Helg, who was a member of Runes of Dianceht, joined the group. In fall 2004, the band recorded their debut album The Flame of Eternity’s Decline, released by Audio Alchemia Studio. Saturious, the keyboardist of black metal group Nokturnal Mortum, and Wortheaux, the guitarist of Finist, collaborated on the record. The mastering took place in Buddha Cat Studio in Moscow. It was released in April 2005 via Oriana Music. In autumn 2005, Nort, a former member of Nagual, joined Khors. Afterwards, Khors performed their first concerts.

After a small tour in Ukraine, the recording of the second album had started in February 2006 in M-Art Studio and Audio Alchemia Studio. Saturious and Wortherax took part in recording again. Mixing and mastering was made by Buddha Cat Studio in Moscow as it was with the first record. The second album, Cold, was released by Oriana Music in December 2006. To promote the album, Khors toured Ukraine and Russia.

In late autumn of 2007 members of Khors entered the Kyiv studio Blacklight for recording the third album. The record was finished in summer 2008. Meantime, Cold, the second album of the band, was released by Heidenwut Productions (UK) together with Ancient Nation Production (Ukraine) on LP. At the same time, Eclectic Productions released DVD Cold Ways, which contains video bootleg filmed during band’s concert activity. By the end of 2008 the third album, entitled Mysticism, was released on digipack CD by American label Paragon Records. In 2009 Mysticism album was licensed by Irond Records (Russia) especially for CIS territories. Group went to the tour in Ukraine. In the middle of the year first changes in the line-up of the group has started. Warth, who played with group Faces of Death before, took the place of the guitarist Nort.

The group started to record their fourth album in February 2010 in Kyiv studio Blacklight. Record was finished in the same year in June. Album which was named Return to Abandoned released in December on Paragon Records and on Irond Records special for CIS. During the same year, Paragon Records released reissue of first two albums The Flame of Eternity’s Decline and Cold; Heidenwut Productions released reissue of the album The Flame of Eternity’s Decline. In summer of 2010 Helg was compelled to leave the band, and was replaced by Jurgis, a former member of groups Gurgabs, Вайтмара and Faces of Death. In 2011 label Eclectic Productions released the second DVD of group named Winter Stronghold.

With the fifth record, Wisdom of Centuries, the band has signed a contract with world-famous major label Candlelight Records. Wisdom of Centuries has become the first band's album performed on the native tongue. By the structure, the album begins and ends with short instrumentals (less than two minutes each), and two more relatively brief instrumentals appear in the middle of the 8-song, 40-minute collection. Along with the album release, Khors presented the music video for the song "The Last Leaves". Filming took place in Cherkasy Oblast in September 2012.

Released in 2015, the 6th full-length Night Falls Onto the Fronts of Ours is further strengthening the band’s position on the European scene, and is getting limited in a few months. Metal music reviewers characterize this album as solid mid-tempo black metal with doomy overtones; melancholic and atmospheric mood contrasting to the fierce vocals that all blends together into a nicely polished evil sound.

On December 8, 2018 Khors released EP Beyond the Bestial, that lasts for 35 minutes. This EP consists of six tracks: three new songs, and a new approach of the band towards three older songs from the album Mysticism, to honor its 10th anniversary.

On May 6, 2020 the band announced the finishing of the new eight tracks/fifty minutes album recording on their official Facebook page.

The band's seventh full-length entitled Where the Word Acquires Eternity was released on September 15, 2020 via Ashen Dominion label. According to the band's press release which was posted on the band's official Facebook page, the new album is a concept one dedicated to the events that took place in their native city of Kharkiv in the 30s of the XX century – the times called Renaissance of Ukrainian culture.

== Members ==
=== Current ===
- Khorus – bass (2004–present)
- Khaoth – drums (2004–present)
- Jurgis – vocals, guitar (2010–present)
- Andres – guitar (2019–present)

=== Past members ===
- Helg – vocals, guitar (2004–2010, 2011–2019)
- Nort – guitar (2005–2009)
- Warth – guitar (2009–2011)

== Discography ==
=== Studio albums ===
- 2005 - The Flame of Eternity’s Decline (Oriana Music)
- 2006 - Cold (Oriana Music)
- 2008 - Mysticism (Paragon Records)
- 2010 - Return To Abandoned (Paragon Records)
- 2012 - Wisdom of Centuries (Мудрість Століть; Candlelight Records)
- 2015 - Night Falls Onto the Front of Ours (І Ніч Схиляється До Наших Лиць; Candlelight Records)
- 2020 - Where the Word Acquires Eternity (Де Слово Набуває Вічності; Ashen Dominion)
- 2024 - Letters to the Future Self (Drakkar Productions)

=== Other albums ===
- 2017 - Following the Years of Blood II (Live album; Ashen Dominion)
- 2018 - Beyond the Bestial (За межами тваринного) (EP; Ashen Dominion)

== Videography ==
=== DVD ===
- 2008 - Cold Ways (Eclectic Productions)
- 2011 - Winter Stronghold (Eclectic Productions)
- 2016 - Following the Years of Blood (Eclectic Productions)

== See also ==
- Black metal
- Nokturnal Mortum
- Hate Forest
