= Heidevolk =

Dutch folk metal band

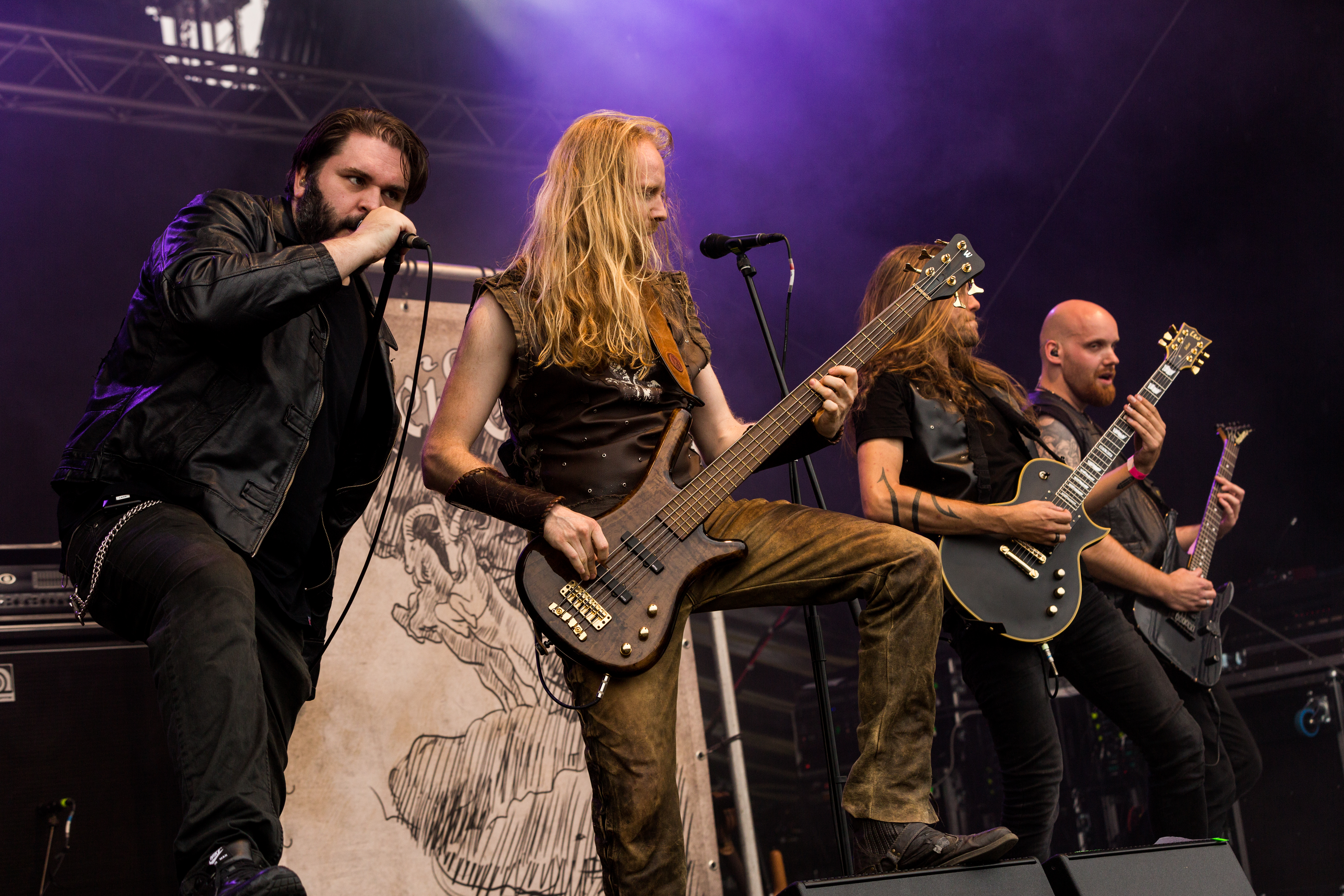
- Heidevolk performing in 2017

Background information
- Origin: Arnhem, Netherlands
- Genres: Folk metal; pagan metal; Viking metal
- Years active: 2002–present
- Label: Napalm
- Members: Rowan Roodbaert; Mat van Baest; Jacco Bühnebeest; Joost den Vellenknotscher; Koen Vuurdichter
- Past members: See below
- Website: heidevolk.com

Heidevolk (Dutch pronunciation: [ˈhɛi̯dəˌvɔlk]) is a Dutch folk metal band. The lyrical themes of their music are inspired by nature, the history of Gelderland, and Germanic mythology. Most of their lyrics are in Dutch; however, on their 2015 album, Velua, they have one original English song, "Vinland", and several English covers. Their 2018 album, Vuur van verzet, contains two English-language songs: "A Wolf in My Heart" and "The Alliance".

== History ==
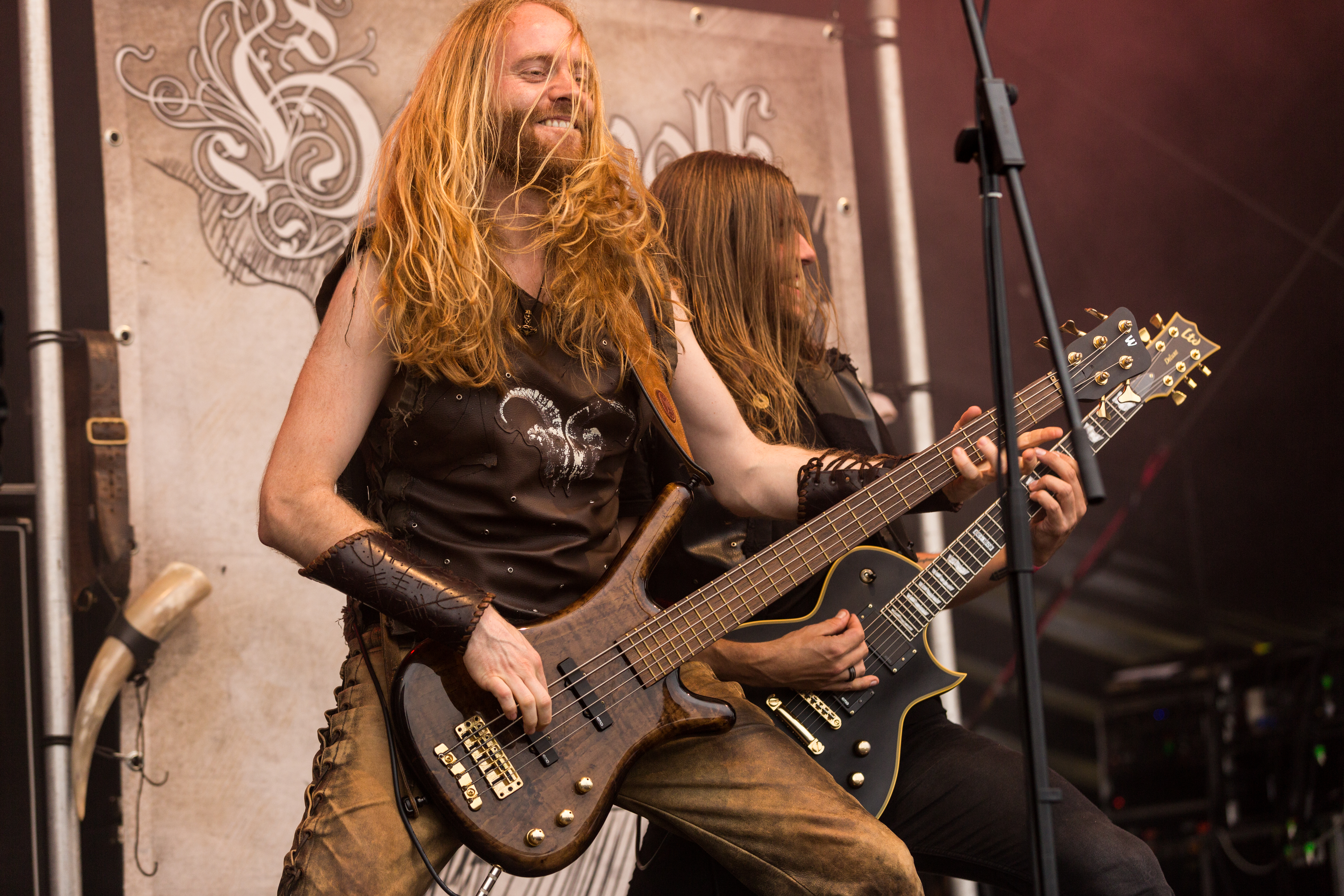
Rowan Roodbaert and Kevin Storm performing at the 2017 Metal Frenzy Festival

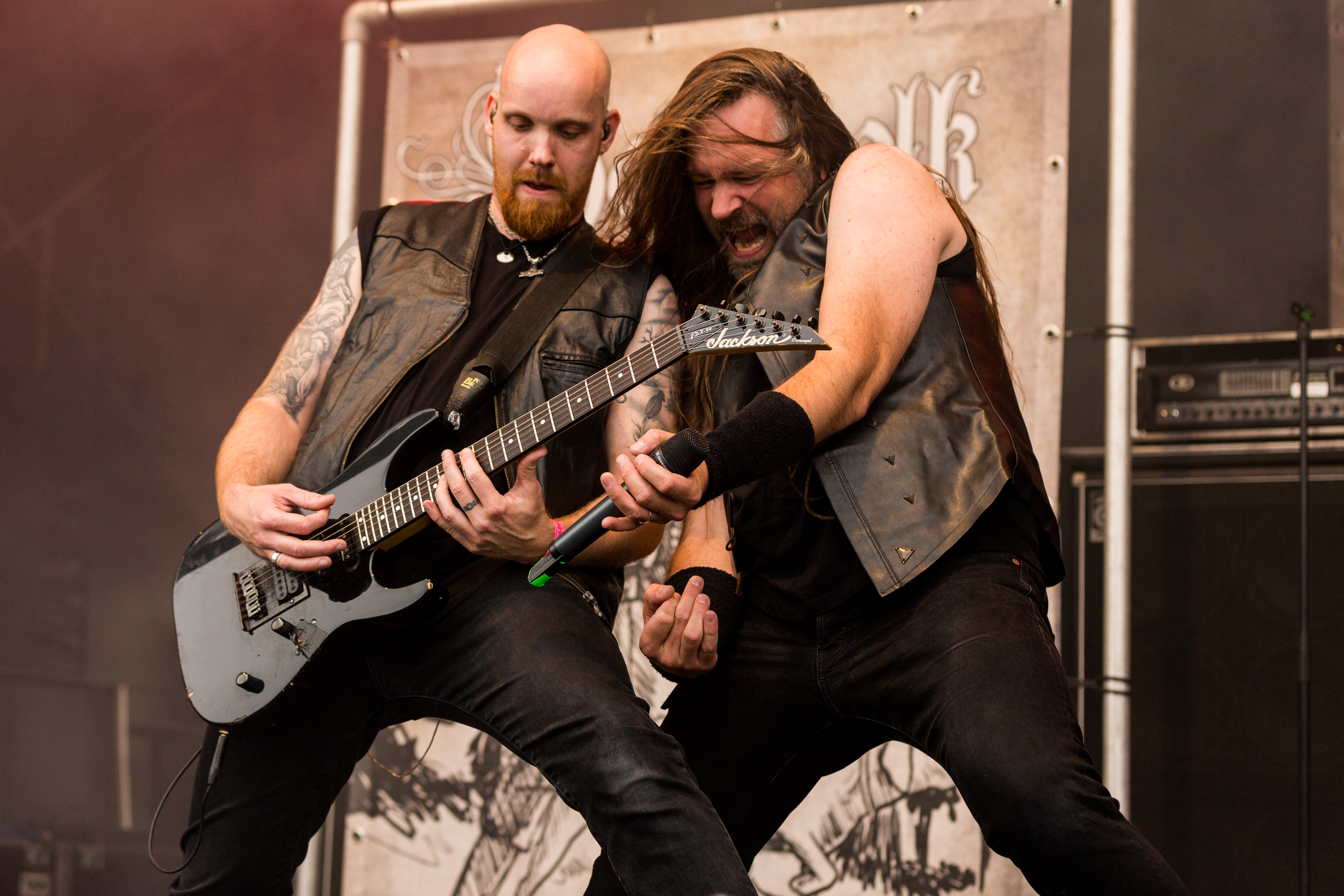
Koen Vuurdichter and Jacco Bühnebeest at the 2017 Metal Frenzy Festival

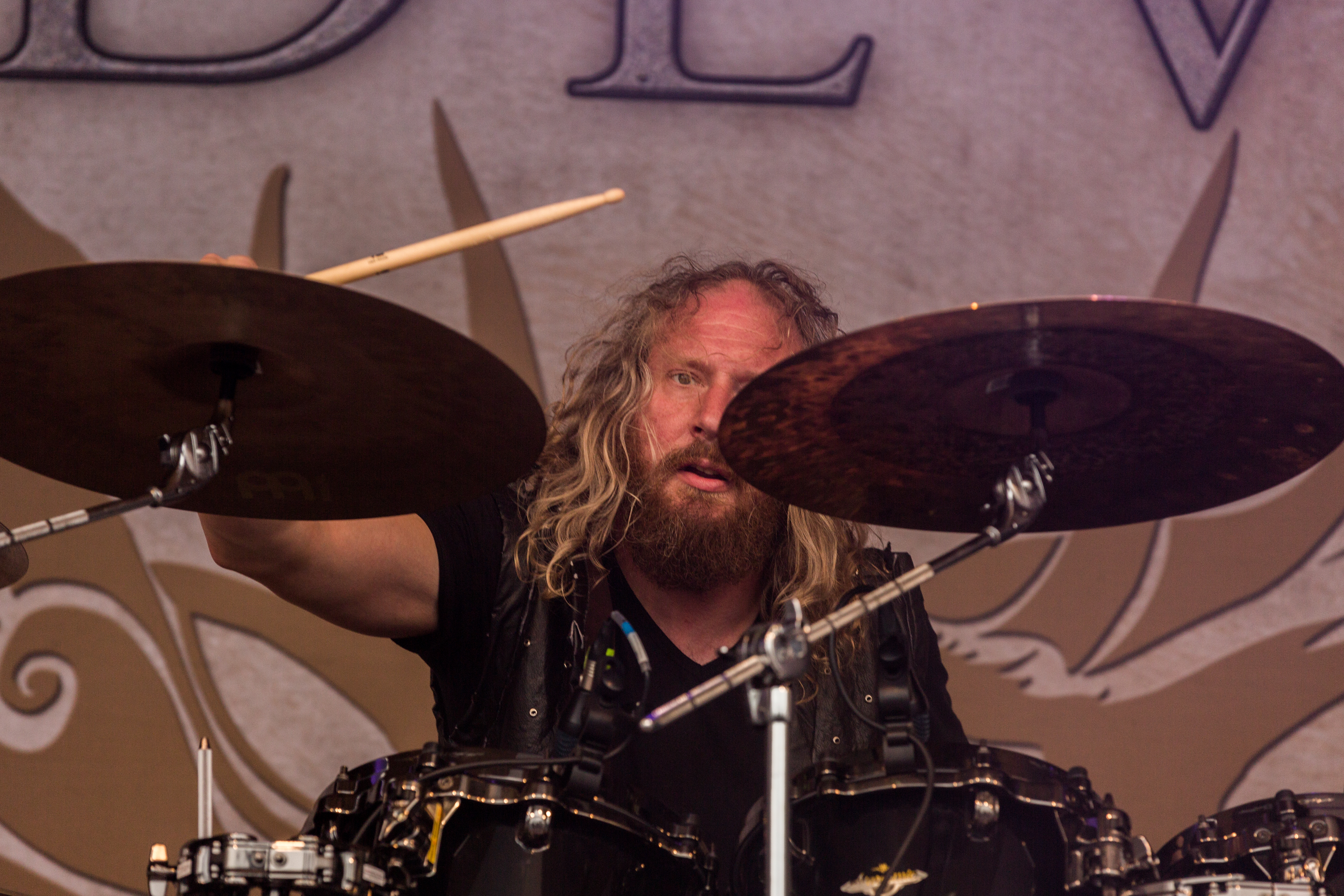
Joost den Vellenknotscher at the 2017 Metal Frenzy Festival

Heidevolk was founded under the name Hymir in 2002. They later changed their name to Heidevolk (Dutch for 'heath-folk' or 'heather folk'), inspired by the Veluwe landscape. The band started performing live in 2003. They have since released one demo, six full-length studio albums, and one EP.

Their third album, Uit oude grond, was released to generally positive critical acclaim, with one writer calling the album "A hugely enjoyable release combining aggressive metallic riffage with tastefully entwined traditional folk instrumentation and melody".

== Collaborations ==
Vocalists Mark Bockting and Joris Boghtdrincker have contributed vocals to the Arkona song "Na Moey Zemle" (На моей земле) (In My Land). The track also features vocalists from Månegarm (Sweden), Obtest (Lithuania), Menhir (Germany), and Skyforger (Latvia). Each sings in their native language, playing the role of warriors from that region, describing their homeland to a traveler.

== Band members ==
=== Current ===
- Jacco de Wijs (Jacco Bühnebeest) – vocals (2015–present)
- Daniël Wansink (Daniël den Dorstighe) – vocals (2021-present)
- Koen Romeijn (Koen Vuurdichter) – guitar (2015–present)
- Mat van Baest (Mat Snaerenslijper)– guitar (2020–present)
- Rowan Middelwijk (Rowan Roodbaert) – bass guitar (2006–present)
- Kevin van den Heiligenberg (Kevin Houtsplijter) – drums (2022–present)

=== Former ===
- Joris Boghtdrincker – vocals (2002–2013)
- Jesse Vuerbaert (Ohtar) – vocals (2002–2005)
- Niels Beenkerver – guitar (2002–2005)
- Paul Braadvraat – bass guitar (2002–2006)
- Sebas van Eldik (Sebas Bloeddorst) – guitar (2002–2011)
- Joost Westdijk (Joost den Vellenknotscher) – drums (2002–2022)
- Reamon Bomenbreker – guitar (2005–2015)
- Mark Splintervuyscht – vocals (2005–2015)
- Stefanie Speervrouw – violin (2007–2008)
- Kevin Vruchtbaert – guitar (2012–2015)
- Lars Vogel (Lars Nachtbraeker) – vocals (2013–2020)
- Kevin Storm – guitar (2016–2018)

== Discography ==
- De strijdlust is geboren (2005)
- Wodan heerst (EP, 2007)
- Walhalla wacht (2008)
- Uit oude grond (2010)
- Batavi (2012)
- Velua (2015)
- Vuur van verzet (2018)
- Wederkeer (2023)
