= The Voice of Steel =

The Voice of Steel Holos stali

Studio album by Nokturnal Mortum
- Released: 26 December 2009
- Recorded: 2006 – May 2009
- Studio: OSF Studio, Kharkiv, Ukraine
- Genre: Symphonic black metal; folk metal
- Length: 69:41
- Language: Ukrainian
- Label: Oriana Music
- Producer: Varggoth

Nokturnal Mortum chronology
Live in Katowice (2009)	The Voice of Steel; Holos stali (2009)

Holos stali (Ukrainian: Голос сталі [ˈɦɔlos ˈstɑl⁽ʲ⁾i]; English: The Voice of Steel) is an album by the Ukrainian black metal band Nokturnal Mortum, released in December 2009. The album was mixed at M.A.R.T. Studio, Kharkiv, during August and October 2009. Mastering took place in the Mana Recording Studios, Florida, in November 2009. The album was remixed and remastered in 2014 through Heritage Records.

== Track listing ==
No.	Title	Lyrics	Music	Translation	Length
1.	"Інтро"			Intro	3:06
2.	"Голос сталі"	Dmytro Blyzno	Varggoth	The Voice of Steel	9:55
3.	"Валькирия"	Varggoth	Varggoth	Valkyrie	10:48
4.	"Україна"	Varggoth	Varggoth, Saturious	Ukraine	8:24
5.	"Моєї мрії острови"	Varggoth	Varggoth, Saturious	My Dream Islands	11:48
6.	"Шляхом сонця"	Varggoth	Varggoth	By the Path of the Sun	9:07
7.	"Небо сумних ночей"	Varggoth	Varggoth, Saturious	Sky of Saddened Nights	4:51
8.	"Біла вежа"	Varggoth	Varggoth	White Tower	11:48
Total length:					69:41

== Personnel ==
Nokturnal Mortum

- Varggoth – vocals, guitar, cover design
- Astargh – guitar, backing vocals
- Vrolok – bass
- Bairoth – drums, percussion
- Saturious – keyboards, folk instruments

Additional musicians and production

- Odalv – drums and percussion on Моєї Мрії Острови and Шляхом Сонця
- W. Angel – clean vocals
- Alafern – violin
- Andriy Veriovkin – recording
- Serhiy Kondratiev – mixing and acoustics on Небо Сумних Ночей
- Brian Elliott – mastering
- Viktor Titov – cover design
- Sir Gorgoroth – artwork
