= Wodan heerst =

Wodan Heerst

EP by Heidevolk
- Released: 2007
- Genre: Folk metal, pagan metal
- Length: 14:28
- Label: Independent

Heidevolk chronology
De Strijdlust is Geboren (2005)	Wodan Heerst (2007)	Walhalla Wacht (2008)

Wodan Heerst is an EP by the Dutch pagan/ folk metal band Heidevolk. The first track is included on the band's following studio album, Walhalla Wacht. The second track is a remixed version of a song featured on Heidevolk's previous release, De Strijdlust is Geboren; it features more violin than the previous version. The third and final track is a cover of a song by the band Normaal. The lyrics can be read as a simple catechism of Wodan and his acts, mainly describing his quests for divine wisdom, interspersed with prayers to and praise of the god.

== Track listing ==
No.	Title	Length
1.	"Wodan heerst" (Odin reigns)	7:57
2.	"Het bier zal weer vloeien" (The beer will flow again – Violin version)	2:48
3.	"Vulgaris Magistralis" (Normaal cover)	3:43
