= Twilightfall =

Demo album by Nokturnal Mortum
- Released: 1995
- Recorded: 1994–1995 at SMS-Factory
- Genre: Black metal
- Length: 50:44
- Label: SMS Factory
- Producer: Nokturnal Mortum

Nokturnal Mortum chronology
Twilightfall (1995)	Lunar Poetry (1996)

Twilightfall is the first demo by Ukrainian black metal band Nokturnal Mortum. This release had a more doom metallic sound not to be heard on any other album. It was re-released in 2004 on CD by Oriana Productions with a different cover art.

== Track listing ==
Twilightfall
No.	Title	Length
1.	"The Unnothingless from Beyond (Siseneg)"	2:33
2.	"Autumn Opposition"	9:53
3.	"Cry of Ukraina"	7:12
4.	"Where Rivers Flow Into the Seas"	3:10
5.	"Glass Coffin"	7:06
6.	"On the Wings of Scarlet Sunset"	8:16
7.	"Oriana (Waterfall of Twilight)"	1:06
8.	"Dark Flower of Temptation"	8:10
9.	"Tnematset Wen: Nocturnal Mortum"	3:18

Notes

- Lyrics have not been published for any of the songs.
