= Percival (band) =

Polish folk music band

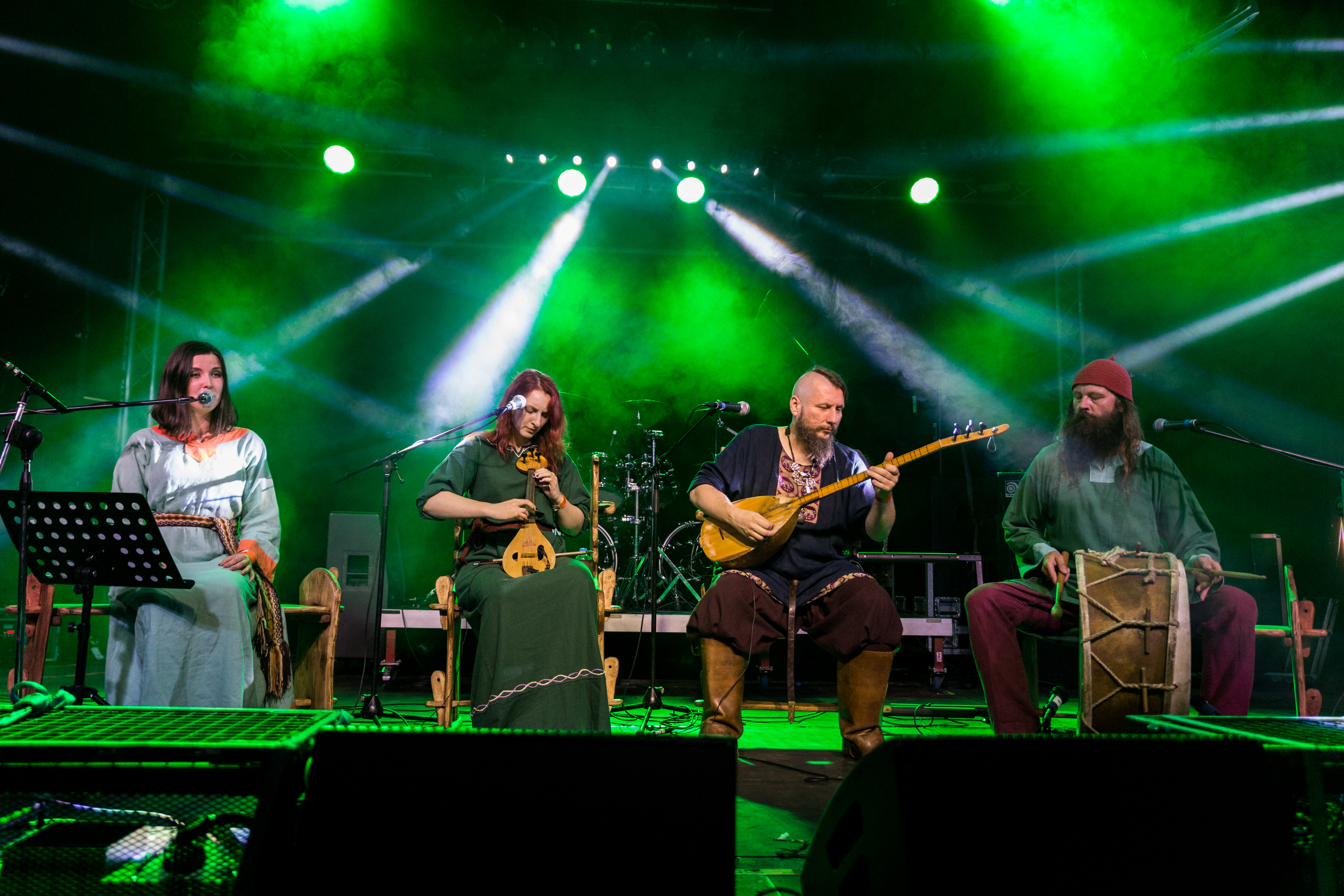
- Percival at Wave-Gotik-Treffen 2017 in Germany

Background information
- Also known as: Percival Schuttenbach
- Origin: Lubin, Poland
- Genres: Slavic metal, folk metal
- Years active: 1999–present
- Members: Mikołaj Rybacki – long-necked lute (bağlama) and vocals Katarzyna Bromirska – Byzantine lyra and vocals Joanna Lacher – bodhrán, davul and vocals Christina Bogdanova – bodhrán, davul and vocals
- Website: percival.pl/eng

Percival, or Percival Schuttenbach, is a Polish folk metal band from Lubin, formed by musicians due to their fascination with history and historical reenactment in 1999. The name "Percival" refers not to any historical figure, but to the gnome named Percival Schuttenbach from Andrzej Sapkowski's The Witcher series of novels. The leaders of the band are Mikołaj Rybacki and Katarzyna Bromirska. They became known for their song Lazare which was used as a song for the soundtrack of The Witcher 3: Wild Hunt video game.

== Musical style ==
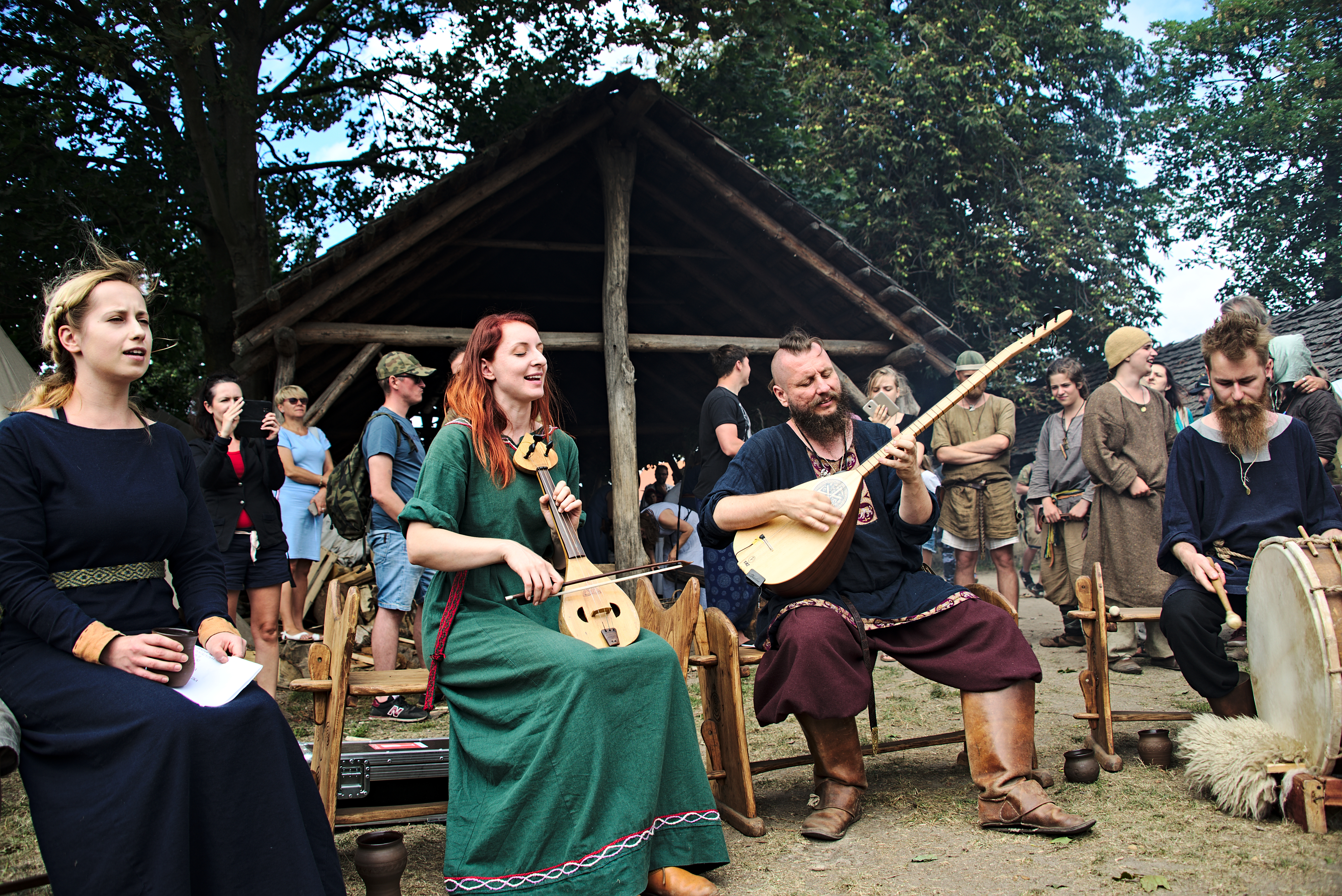
Percival in 2018

The band plays traditional songs of Europe, mostly Slavic, and its own compositions referring to Early Medieval times, such as the Vikings era and pagan Europe. Musicians play traditional instruments: long-necked lute (saz or Bağlama), byzantine lyra (rebec), drums, and flutes. Percival presents its music during historical events in Poland (e.g. the biggest Viking and Slavic festival in Poland on Wolin island), as well as abroad in Germany, France, Czech Republic, Lithuania, Slovakia, Belgium, Isle of Man and Scandinavia.

In 2010, the musicians began cooperation with music producer Donatan. Project "Equinox" (Polish: Równonoc) combines traditional Slavic sounds with hip-hop music. They ended their relations in 2013, over a financial dispute.

One of Percival's songs, inspired by the game The Witcher 3: Wild Hunt, for which they also wrote music, was added to an e-book, Sezon Burz, by Andrzej Sapkowski.

== Albums ==
- Eiforr – CD – 2007
- Oj Dido – CD – 2008
- Słowiański Mit o Stworzeniu Świata (Slavonic Myth of Creation) – CD – 2009
- Slava! Pieśni Słowian Południowych (Slava! Songs of the South Slavs) – CD – 2012
- Slava! Pieśni Słowian Wschodnich (Slava! Songs of the East Slavs) – CD – 2014
- Slava! Pieśni Słowian Zachodnich (Slava! Songs of the West Slavs) – CD – 2018
- Slava! Pieśni Słowian Przyszłości (Slava! Songs of the Slavs of the Future) – CD – 2023
- Ćwierć wieku muzyki (Quarter of a century of music) – 2025
- SLAVIC WARS - The Rise of the Slavic Gods – 2025

== Awards ==
- "Virtual Fiddle" plebiscite (Polish: Wirtualne Gęśle) – for the best folk record of the year 2007- "Eiforr" – the 6th place
- "Virtual Fiddle" plebiscite – for the best folk record of the year 2008 – "Oj Dido" – the 4th place
- "Virtual Fiddle" plebiscite – for the best folk record of the year 2009 – "Slowianski Mit o Stworzeniu Swiata" – the 5th place
- "Virtual Fiddle" plebiscite – for the best folk record of the year 2012 – "Slava!" – the 4th place
- "Virtual Fiddle" plebiscite – "Slava!" – the best cover project by Zuzanna Chanska
