= Sen Svaja =

- Origin: Vilnius, Lithuania
- Genres: Experimental post-folk, world music
- Years active: 2010–present
- Labels: Dangus
- Members: Dorotė Girskienė; Živilė Razinkovienė; Agota Zdanavičiūtė

Sen Svaja (from Old Prussian: sen swajjais – 'with our own', 'with those who we know') is a Lithuanian experimental post-folk and world music band from Vilnius, formed in 2010. The band consists of Dorotė Girskienė, Živilė Razinkovienė and Agota Zdanavičiūtė. Sen Svaja focuses on ancient Lithuanian folk songs and folk music worldwide, also integrating elements of oriental music, Slavic folk and jazz music in their sound.

== History ==
Logo

In 2015 the band released their debut album Laumių lopšinė (Lullaby of Hags) dedicated to the late former high priest of Romuva Jonas Trinkūnas.

Sen Svaja's song "Aš atsikėliau" was included in the Lithuanian Music Information Centre's compilation "Note Lithuania: Folk/World 2018". In 2018 the band released their 2nd studio album Kraitis iš pelkės, whose presentation concert took place on May 18 at the Vingis Park.

== Members ==
- Dorotė Girskienė – vocals and percussion
- Živilė Razinkovienė – vocals, kanklės, and percussion
- Agota Zdanavičiūtė – vocals, kanklės, and percussion

== Discography ==
- Laumių Lopšinė (2015)
- Kraitis Iš Pelkės (2018)
