= To the Gates of Blasphemous Fire =

Studio album by Nokturnal Mortum
- Released: 1998
- Recorded: 1997 at Beat Studio
- Genre: Black metal
- Length: 49:27
- Label: Oriana Music
- Producer: Nokturnal Mortum

Nokturnal Mortum chronology
Goat Horns (1997)	To the Gates of Blasphemous Fire (1998)	Nekhrist (1999)

Professional ratings
Review scores
Source	Rating
Chronicles of Chaos	7/10

To the Gates of Blasphemous Fire is the second album by Ukrainian black metal band Nokturnal Mortum. It was dedicated to Igor Naumchuk of Lucifugum.

== Track listing ==
All lyrics are written by Nokturnal Mortum.

No.	Title	Length
1.	"Bestial Summoning"	5:59
2.	"To the Gates of Blasphemous Fire"	5:26
3.	"On the Moonlight Path"	5:24
4.	"The Hands of Chaos"	5:09
5.	"Under the Banners of the Horned Knjaz"	5:57
6.	"The 13th Asbath Celebration"	8:30
7.	"Cheremosh"	6:06
8.	"The Forgotten Ages of Victories"	6:54

Notes

- Lyrics have not been published for the song "Under the Banners of the Horned Knjaz"
