= Goat Horns =

Studio album by Nokturnal Mortum
- Released: July 1997
- Recorded: 1996, Kharkiv
- Genre: Symphonic black metal
- Length: 51:45
- Label: Morbid Noizz
- Producer: Nokturnal Mortum

Nokturnal Mortum chronology
Lunar Poetry (1996)	Goat Horns (1997)	To the Gates of Blasphemous Fire (1998)

Professional ratings
Review scores
Source	Rating
Chronicles of Chaos	8/10

Goat Horns is the debut studio album by Ukrainian black metal band Nokturnal Mortum. It was released on cassette tape in July 1997, through Morbid Noizz Productions.

== Track listing ==
All lyrics are written by Nokturnal Mortum.

No.	Title	Length
1.	"Black Moon Overture"	4:47
2.	"Kuyaviya"	7:02
3.	"Goat Horns"	9:04
4.	"Unholy Orathania"	8:07
5.	"Veles' Scrolls"	11:47
6.	"Kolyada"	7:08
7.	"Eternal Circle"	3:50

== Personnel ==
- Knjaz Varggoth: Guitars, Vocals
- Karpath: Guitars
- Sataroth: Keyboards
- Saturious: Keyboards
- Xaar Quath: Bass
- Munruthel: Drums
