= 0%Mercury =

Ukrainian metalcore band

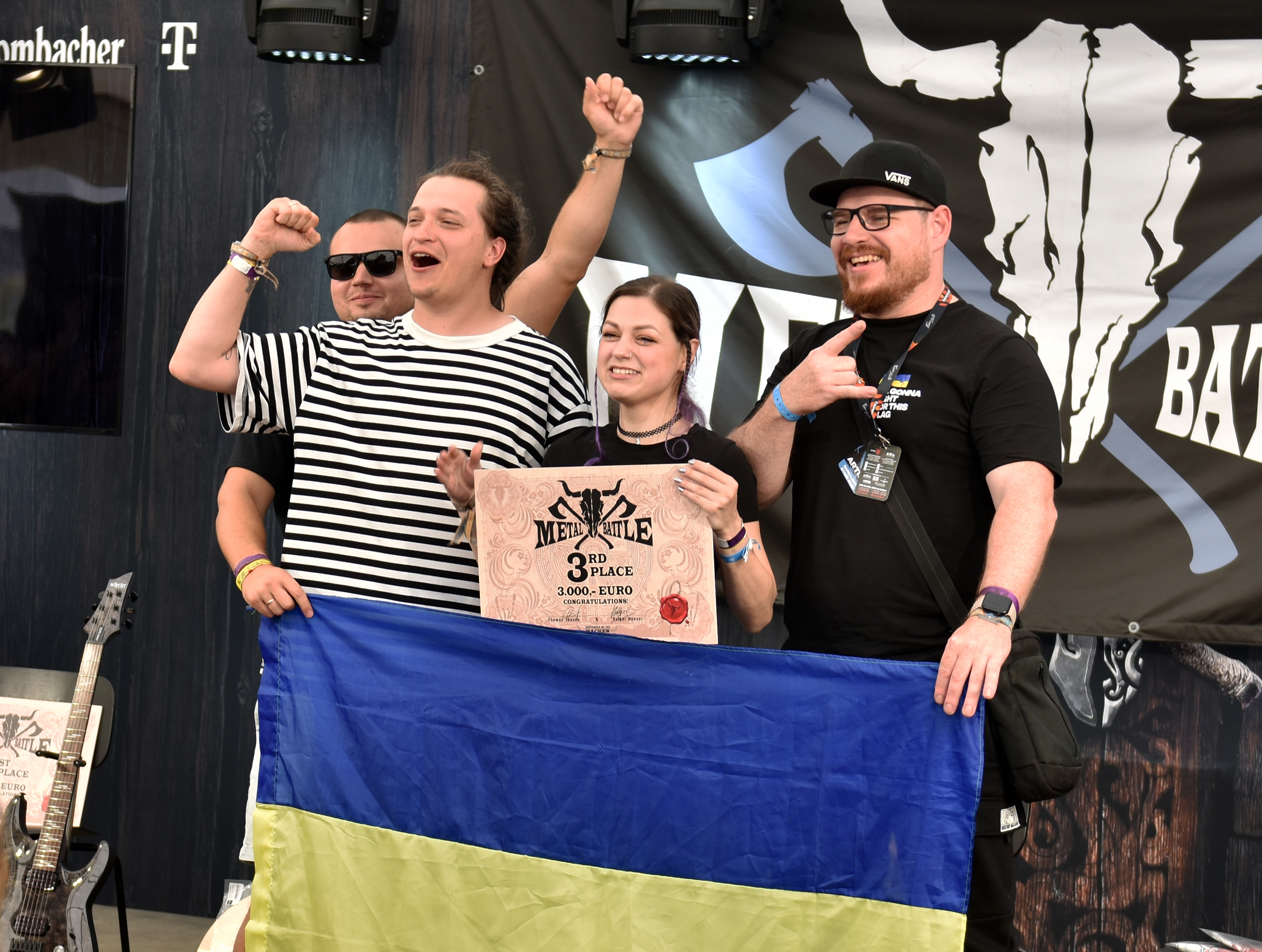
- 0% Mercury at 2023 Wacken Open Air Battle

Background information
- Origin: Kharkiv, Ukraine
- Genres: Metalcore
- Years active: 2016–present

0%Mercury is a Ukrainian metalcore/deathcore band from Kharkiv. The band won the 3rd place in the 2023 Wacken Open Air metal battle competition.

== History ==
The band was formed in 2016 in Ukraine. They released their first studio album on 24 November 2023, named "We Should Definitely Do This!".

On 28 July 2023, the band performed at Faine Misto Festival in Lviv.

In August 2023, the band performed at Wacken Open Air. At that festival, the band also won the 3rd place in the metal battle.

== Discography ==
- We Should Definitely Do This! (2023)
- Аокігахара (невеликий альбом) (2024)
