= Ignea =

Ukrainian metal band

- Also known as: Parallax (2013–2015)
- Origin: Kyiv, Ukraine
- Genres: Melodic death metal; symphonic metal; oriental metal; progressive metal
- Years active: 2013–present
- Labels: Napalm, independent
- Members: Helle Bohdanova; Yevhenii Zhytniuk; Oleksandr Kamyshin; Dmytro Vinnichenko
- Past members: Maxim Khmelevsky; Ivan Kholmohorov
- Website: ignea.band

Ignea (stylized in all caps; /ˈiɡ.nɪ.ə/) is a Ukrainian melodic metal band formed in Kyiv in 2013. Ignea began as Parallax and rebranded to their current name in 2015. The band mixes different heavy metal subgenres, the main of which are melodic death metal, symphonic metal, progressive metal, and oriental metal.

== Band members ==
Current

- Helle Bohdanova – vocals (2013–present)
- Yevhenii Zhytniuk – keyboards (2013–present)
- Oleksandr Kamyshin – bass (2013–present)
- Dmytro Vinnichenko – guitar (2015–present)

Former

- Maxim Khmelevsky – guitar (2013–2015)
- Ivan Kholmohorov – drums (2015–2025)

Timeline

== Discography ==
Albums

- The Sign of Faith (2017)
- The Realms of Fire and Death (2020)
- Dreams of Lands Unseen (2023)
- Monumental (2026)

EPs

- Sputnik (2013)
- Bestia (2021) — split with Ersedu

Singles

- "Petrichor" (2014)
- "Alga" (2015)
- "Queen Dies" (2018)
- "Disenchantment" (2020)
- "Jinnslammer" (2020)
- "Bosorkun" (2021)
- "Mermaids" (2021)
- "Nomad's Luck" (2023)
- "Dunes" (2023)
- "Incurable Disease" (2023)
- "Dreams of Lands Unseen" (2026)
- "Darkness" (2026)
