= Žalvarinis =

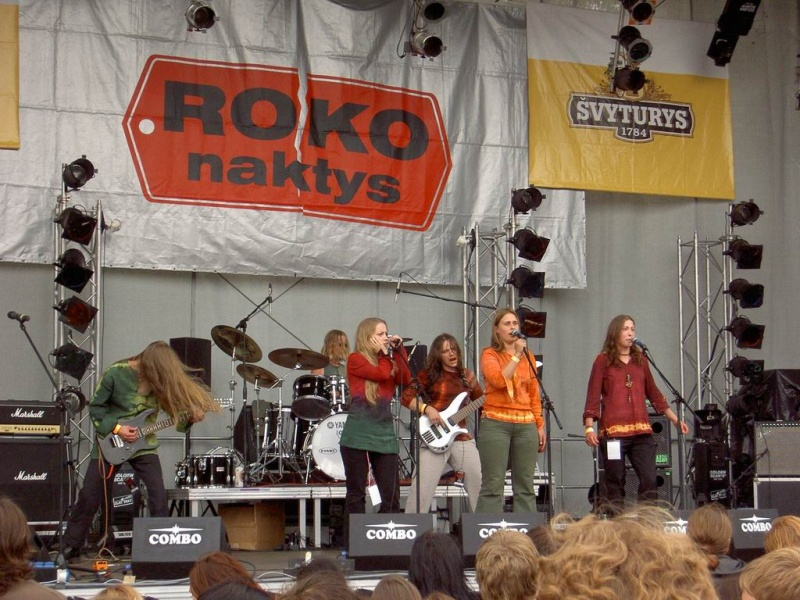
- Performing at "Rock nights 2005" festival

Background information
- Origin: Vilnius, Lithuania
- Genres: Folk rock, World music
- Years active: 2001–present
- Labels: None
- Spinoff of: Ugnėlakis; Kūlgrinda
- Members: Robertas Semeniukas; Sigita Jonynaitė-Žostautienė
- Website: http://www.zalvarinis.lt/

Žalvarinis (Lithuanian for 'made from brass, brazen') is a folk rock band from Vilnius, Lithuania. They were formed in 2001 as a collaboration between the pagan metal group Ugnėlakis and the pagan folk group Kūlgrinda. This was reflected in the title of their debut album in 2002, Ugnėlakis su Kūlgrinda.

On 19 December 2023, the band was announced among the competing artists of Eurovizija.LT, the Lithuanian national final for the Eurovision Song Contest 2024, with the song "Gaudė vėjai". They came second in the second semi-final on 20 January 2024, qualifying for the final.

== Style ==
The lyrics for the band's songs are usually taken from the folklore of Lithuanian people and are sung in their original Lithuanian language. Žalvarinis' music frequently features singing technique of traditional Lithuanian sutartinė (a form of glee), usually sung by the band's three female singers – examples of sutartinė can be heard in their tracks Ailiom susėdom, Dijūta or Ožys. Authentic pronunciation as well as ancient words and their forms in folk songs are also usually preserved by the band. As a legacy of Kūlgrinda, the band also features several folk-songs of Old Prussians.

Žalvarinis's sound, on the other hand, while still influenced by traditional Lithuanian folk music, is more modern – generally speaking, it is a mix of traditional heavy metal and progressive rock. The first album of the band was metal-influenced, however the sound becomes more progressive in later albums.

The song Aš kanapį sėjau (I Sowed a Hemp), taken from the 2005 album Žalio vario was featured on Transformations in Lithuanian Song – a 2006 compilation CD that covered the development of Lithuanian folk music over many years. It was published by the Lithuanian-American journal Lituanus.

== Members ==
=== Current members ===
- Robertas Semeniukas - vocals, electric, acoustic and slide guitars, keyboards, music director
- Sigita Jonynaitė - vocals
- Rytis Vasiliauskas - bass guitar
- Martynas Lukoševičius - drums

=== Former members ===
- Viltė Ambrazaitytė - vocals
- Domas Žostautas - bass guitar
- Sergej Makidon - drums
- Jonas Lengvinas - drums
- Tadas Žukauskas - bass guitar
- Ineta Meduneckytė-Tamošiūnienė – vocals
- Laurita Peleniūtė – vocals
- Paulius Jaskūnas – bass guitar
- Simonas Gudelis – drums
- Aurimas Lemežis – bass guitar
- Marius Būda – electric guitar
- Ramūnas Pocius – vocals, pipes
- Eglė Pakšytė – vocals
- Dariush Loznikoff – bass
- Demonas – bass
- Arūnas Lukaševičius – bass
- Ilja Molodcov – drums
- Aidas Buivydas – guitar

=== Discography ===
- Ugnėlakis su Kūlgrinda (2002, Bomba records)
- Žalio vario (2005, Prior music) translates as [Made] of Green Copper, green copper being an archaic name for brass
- Folk n' Rock (2008, Monako Productions)
- Gyvas (2014, RS Records)
- Teka (2016, RS Records)
- Einam Tolyn (2018, RS Records)
- The Best of Žalvarinis (2019, RS Records)
- Švęskime Laisvę! (2019, RS Records)
- Demo & Remix 2008-2015 (2020, RS Records)
- Cantabile (2022, RS Records)
- Live at Kilkim Žaibu Festival XX (2023, RS Records)
- Žalio Vario XX (2025, RS Records)
- Šventaragis (2026, RS Records)
