= Nokturnal Mortum =

Ukrainian black metal band

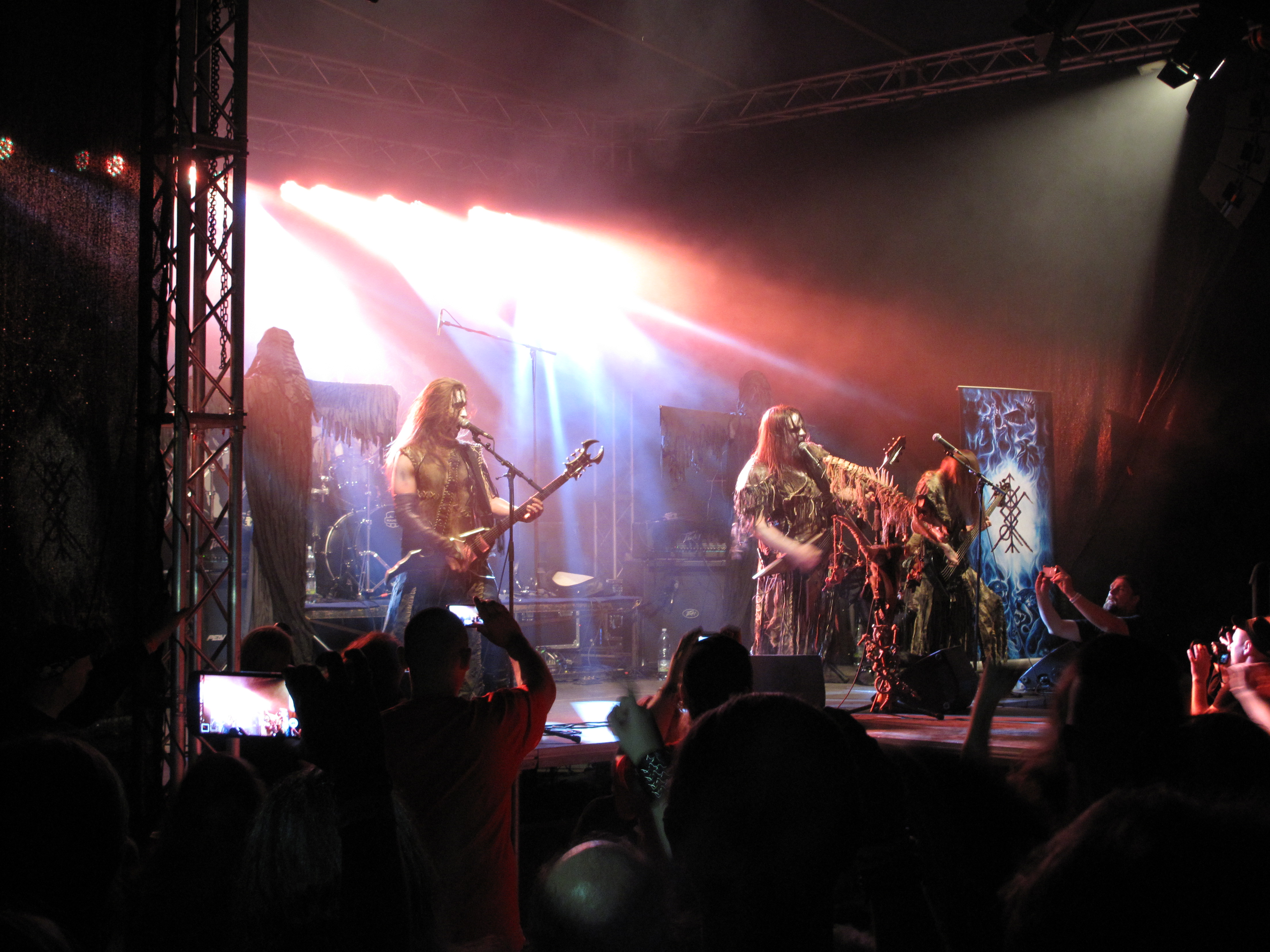
- Nokturnal Mortum at Hell Fast Attack 2015

Background information
- Origin: Kharkiv, Ukraine
- Genres: Symphonic black metal; pagan metal; folk metal
- Years active: 1994–present
- Labels: No Colours; Nuclear Blast; Oriana
- Members: Knjaz Varggoth; Wortherax; Kubrakh; Surm; Karpath
- Website: nokturnal-mortum.com

Nokturnal Mortum are a Ukrainian black metal band from Kharkiv. They were one of the founders of the Ukrainian black metal scene. They are also often considered pioneers in the early National Socialist black metal ("NSBM") scene, but the band has since then distanced themselves from openly political statements.

== History ==
Nokturnal Mortum was originally formed as a death metal band called Suppuration in 1991, then turned to black metal and changed name to Crystaline Darkness but "had to change the name back in 1993/94 to Nocturnal Mortum because there already existed a band with that name in Western underground". They have stated this about the current name and spelling: "We changed a letter so that we wouldn't find a band with the same name again like it was the case with Crystaline Darkness". Nokturnal Mortum gained recognition in the underground black metal genre with the release of their debut album Goat Horns, which had two keyboardists play on the album (often on the same song) and for mixing traditional Ukrainian folk influences with black metal.

== Ideology ==
Initially, the band described their music as "lunar black metal". On their 1996 demo Lunar Poetry the band advocated for the killing of Christians, the destruction of churches, and Slavic paganism, along with describing Jesus as a "crucified hippie". Later, when releasing their EP Marble Moon and also the Nechrist and Weltanschauung albums, they included antisemitic lyrics with neo-Nazi and white supremacy messages and imagery.

As the more popular non-political black metal scene (including many shops and concert events) began distancing themselves from their ideology, the band instead became prominent in the early Eastern European National Socialist black metal scene, and is today often considered as one of the groups that shaped the Slavic subcultural NSBM movement. They also began using swastikas in their logo, on albums, during shows, and praising the Third Reich and the Holocaust openly in various side-projects. Knjaz Varggoth, in one of several side projects, also voiced support for the so-called "racial holy war" idea. Nokturnal Mortum's album Нехристь (Nechrist) features a song called "The Call of Aryan Spirit", which includes antisemitic lyrics and the glorification of pogroms. The album's original release included a swastika design consisting of four AK-47s.

In interviews, appearances, merchandise and on their website, the band showcased neo-Nazi opinions but their music style itself was described as "pagan black metal". Statements and texts show neo-völkisch as well as neo-paganist ideas, and a tendency to ariosophy.

In 2008, the band's vocalist and guitarist, Knjaz Varggoth, claimed that he had no interest in political tendencies and that he had, "never viewed Nokturnal Mortum as a political band". In 2014 the group maintained that NM had severed ties with NSBM ideologies and political themes, however these statements appear to contradict some conduct in the following years, as the band has remained active in white supremacist circles and it has played live at neo-Nazi and far right shows, including Ukraine's own Asgardsrei festival in 2016 and 2018. They have also since collaborated with the NSBM label "Militant Zone".

== Members ==
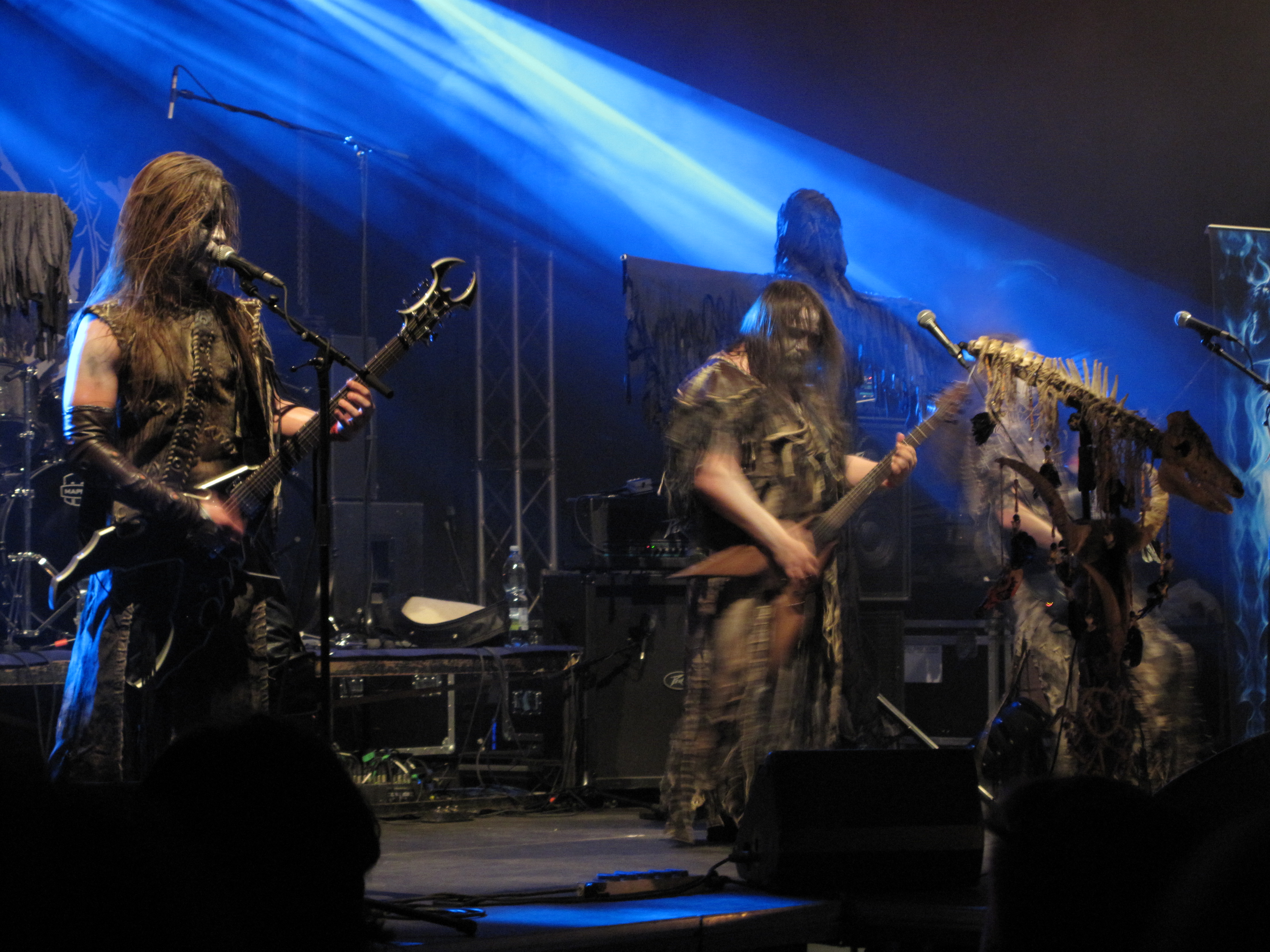
Nokturnal Mortum in 2015

=== Current ===
- Knjaz Varggoth – lead vocals, guitars (1994–present)
- Wortherax – guitars (1994–1996, 2020–present)
- Karpath – guitars (1996–1999), bass (2020–present)
- Odalv – drums (2003–2009, 2023–present)
- Surm – keyboards (2018–present)

=== Former ===
- Xaarquath – bass (1994–2002)
- Munruthel – drums (1994–2003)
- Sataroth – keyboards (1994–2002)
- Saturious – keyboards, folk instruments (1996–2014), bass (2012–2014)
- Vrolok – guitars (2000–2002), bass (2002–2011)
- Alzeth – guitars (2002–2007)
- Astargh – guitars (2007–2011)
- Bairoth – drums (2009–2020)
- Aywar – guitars (2012–2014)
- Rutnar – bass (2014–2020)
- Jurgis – guitars (2014–2020)
- Hyozt – keyboards (2014–2018)
- Kubrakh – drums (2020–2023)

== Discography ==
=== Albums ===
- 1997 – Goat Horns
- 1998 – To the Gates of Blasphemous Fire
- 1999 – Нехристь (NeChrist)
- 2005 – Weltanschauung (Worldview)
- 2009 – Голос сталі (Holos stali, The Voice of Steel)
- 2017 – Істина (Istyna, Verity)
- 2022 – До лунарної поезії (Do lunarnoyi poeziyi, To Lunar Poetry)

=== Live albums ===
- 2009 – Live in Katowice
- 2011 – Коловорот (Kolovorot)
- 2024 – Oberig – Live At Ragnard Reborn Fest

=== EPs ===
- 1997 – Return of the Vampire Lord
- 1997 – Marble Moon
- 2003 – The Taste of Victory
- 2017 – Orathania / Kolyada
- 2026 – Біль / Hurt

=== Demos ===
- 1995 – Twilightfall
- 1995 – Black Clouds Over Slavonic Lands
- 1996 – Lunar Poetry

=== Splits ===
- 1996 – Veche (split Lucifugum)
- 1997 – Path of the Wolf / Return of the Vampire Lord (split Lucifugum)
- 2007 – Eastern Hammer (split Graveland, North, Темнозорь)
- 2016 – The Spirit Never Dies (split Graveland)

=== Compilations ===
- 2001 – Return of the Vampire Lord / Marble Moon
- 2004 – Eleven Years Among the Sheep
- 2016 – 22 Years Among the Sheep
