= Obtest =

Lithuanian extreme metal band

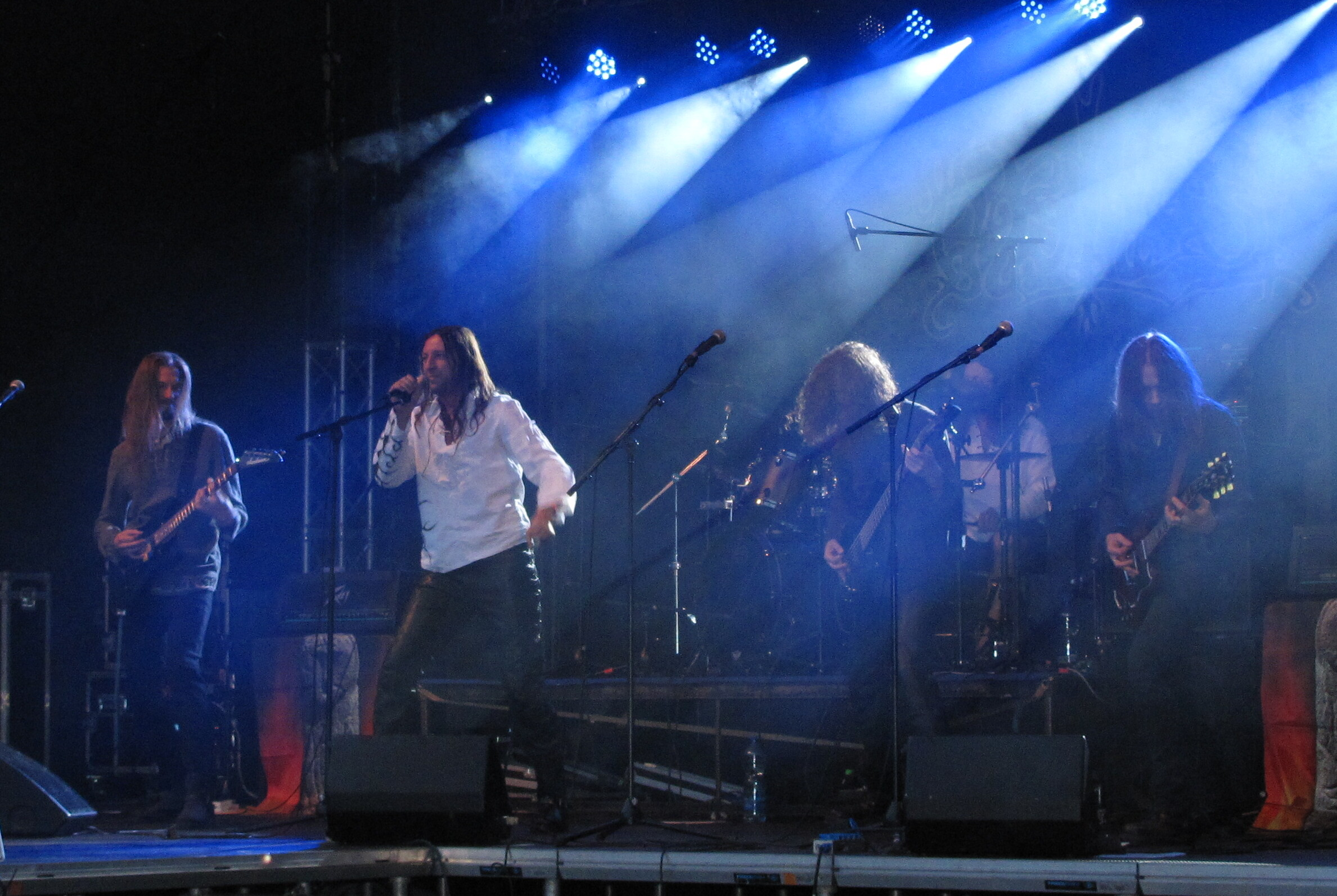
- Obtest in 2015

Background information
- Origin: Vilnius, Lithuania
- Genres: Pagan metal, black metal, folk metal
- Years active: 1992–present
- Labels: Osmose, Ledo Takas, Miriquidi
- Members: Sadlave; Baalberith; Demonas; Insmuth; Enrikas Slavinskis
- Website: obtest.lt

Obtest is a Lithuanian extreme metal band from Vilnius. They started out in 1992 as a death metal act, but soon changed the style to pagan metal/black metal. Their lyrics are related to Lithuanian mythology and are sung in Lithuanian, though a few of the songs on their demos were in English. The band refers their music as "heathen war metal".

== Members ==
Current

- Sadlave – guitar (also in Notanga, ex-Burying Place, Fanarai, ex-Anubi, Agyria, Trolis & The Giberlingers, ex-Ruination)
- Baalberith – vocals
- Karolis – bass
- Insmuth – drums
- Enrikas Slavinskis – guitars (ex-Fata Morgana (Ltu), ex-Stone's Lament, Soul Stealer, Loosers, Crossroad, Degradatonia)

Former

- Demonas – bass (also in Burying Place, ex-Zalvarinis)

== Discography ==
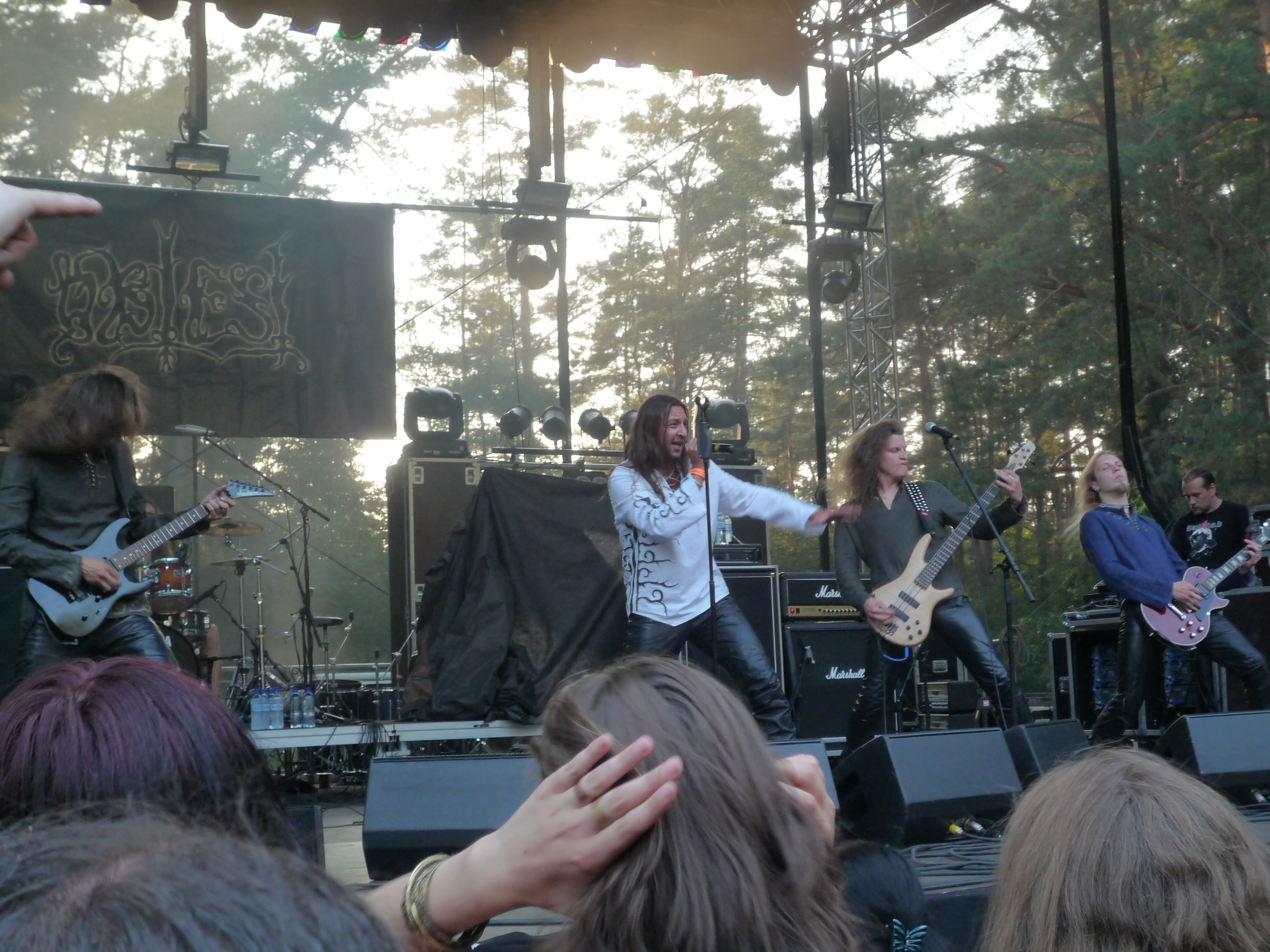
Obtest performing in 2009

- Oldness Coming (demo, 1995) – the title is misspelled "Comming" on the album cover
- Live at Poltergeist (VHS video, 1995)
- Prieš Audrą (demo, 1995)
- Tūkstantmetis (full-length, 1997)
- 9 9 7 (EP, 1998)
- Prisiek (EP, 2001)
- Auka Seniems Dievams (full-length, 2001)
- Dvylika JuodVarnių (EP, 2003)
- Tėvynei (video CD, 2004)
- Iš Kartos Į Kartą (full-length, 2005)
- Prieš Audrą (mini LP, 2006)
- Gyvybės medis (full-length, 2008)
