= Kroda =

Ukrainian pagan metal band

- Origin: Dnipro, Ukraine
- Genres: Black metal, pagan metal, ambient
- Years active: 2003–present
- Label: Purity Through Fire
- Website: kroda.com.ua

Kroda (Ukrainian: Крода) is a Ukrainian pagan metal band formed in 2003 in Dnipro. The band's primary lyrical themes are heathenism, history, nature, traditionalism and anti-Christianity.

== History ==
Kroda was formed by two musicians, Eisenslav and Viterzgir, in March 2003. The name was taken from the Old East Slavic language and means "the fire of burial bonfire". According to legend, when the bodies of the warriors burned, their souls were carried away with the smoke to the Heavenly Palaces of the Gods. The smoke was a kind of a guide to the Rod.

In May 2004, Kroda released their debut full-length album Поплач мені, річко... (Cry to Me, River...) on Stellar Winter Records.

Their second album До небокраю життя... (Towards the Firmaments Verge of Life...) was recorded from January to April 2005, and was released on 20 July the same year. In 2012, it was remastered and reissued on Purity Through Fire Records in Germany.

In August 2007, Kroda made their first live performance at the Ukrainian metal music festival "Svarohovo Kolo II", which was held in Sevastopol. On 22 December, the band participated in the "Kolovorot Fest" in Kharkiv.

Their sixth full-length album, GinnungaGap GinnungaGaldr GinnungaKaos, was released on 1 May 2015.

== Members ==
Current line-up

- Eisenslav – vocals, bass (2003–present)
- One of Thorns – bass (2014–present)
- Rungvar – drums (2014–present)
- Clin – keyboards (2014–present)
- Olgerd – keyboards (2011–present)

Past members

- Viterzgir – guitars, bass, folk instruments, keyboards (2003–2010)
- Khladogard – guitars (2014–2015)

Live musicians

- Beralb – bass (2007–2014)
- AlgizTyr – drums (2007–2008)
- Yurii Krupiak – guitars (2007)
- Serejen – guitars (electric and acoustic) (2007–2010)
- Jotunhammer – sopilka (2007)
- Tur – drums (2008–2010)
- Olgerd – keyboards (2008–2010)

== Discography ==
Studio albums

- Поплач мені, річко... (2004)
- До небокраю життя... (2005)
- Похорон сонця (Fimbulvinter) (2007)
- Fünf Jahre Kulturkampf (2009)
- Schwarzpfad (2011)
- GinnungaGap GinnungaGaldr GinnungaKaos (2015)
- Навій Схрон (Navij Skhron) (2015)
- Selbstwelt (2018)
