= Lunar Poetry =

Demo album by Nokturnal Mortum
- Released: April 1996
- Genre: Symphonic black metal, black metal
- Length: 45:34
- Label: Morbid Noizz, MetalAgen

Nokturnal Mortum chronology
Twilightfall (1995)	Lunar Poetry (1996)	Return of the Vampire Lord (1997)

Professional ratings
Review scores
Source	Rating
Chronicles of Chaos	8/10

Lunar Poetry is the third demo by Ukrainian black metal band Nokturnal Mortum. It was released on cassette tape in April 1996 through Morbid Noizz and MetalAgen Records.

The album was released on CD in 2001 by The End Records.

== Track listing ==
No.	Title	Length
1.	"Tears of Paganism"	1:07
2.	"Lunar Poetry"	4:52
3.	"Perun's Celestial Silver"	7:08
4.	"Carpathian Mysteries"	5:13
5.	"...and Winter Becomes"	4:52
6.	"Ancient Nation"	5:10
7.	"The Grief of Oriana"	5:33
8.	"Sorrows of the Moon" (Celtic Frost cover)	3:46
9.	"Autodafe / Barbarian Dreams"	7:53
Total length:		45:34
